= Swimming at the 2009 World Aquatics Championships – Men's 50 metre breaststroke =

Men's 50 metre breaststroke at the 2009 FINA World Championships
- Venue: Foro Italico
- Dates: 28 July 2009 (heats, semifinals); 29 July 2009 (final)
- Competitors: 161
- Winning time: 26.67 seconds

Medalists
gold medal	Cameron van der Burgh	South Africa
silver medal	Felipe França Silva	Brazil
bronze medal	Mark Gangloff	United States

The heats for the men's 50 metre breaststroke race at the 2009 World Championships took place in the morning and evening of 28 July. The final took place in the evening session of 29 July at the Foro Italico in Rome, Italy.

== Records ==
Prior to this competition, the existing world and competition records were as follows:

World record	Felipe França Silva (BRA)	26.89	Rio de Janeiro, Brazil	8 May 2009
Championship record	James Gibson (GBR)	27.46	Barcelona, Spain	22 July 2003

The following records were established during the competition:

Date	Round	Name	Nationality	Time	Record
28 July	Heat 12	Barry Murphy	(Republic of Ireland) Ireland	27.26	CR
28 July	Heat 15	Brenton Rickard	Australia	27.15	CR
28 July	Heat 16	Cameron van der Burgh	South Africa	26.92	CR
28 July	Semifinal 1	Felipe França Silva	Brazil	26.92	=CR
28 July	Semifinal 2	Cameron van der Burgh	South Africa	26.74	WR
29 July	Final	Cameron van der Burgh	South Africa	26.67	WR

== Results ==
=== Heats ===
Rank	Name	Nationality	Time	Heat	Lane	Notes
1	Cameron van der Burgh	South Africa	26.92	16	4	CR, AF
2	Felipe França Silva	Brazil	27.12	17	4	
3	Brenton Rickard	Australia	27.15	15	2	OC
4	Matjaž Markič	Slovenia	27.19	17	3	
5	Alessandro Terrin	Italy	27.20	16	5	NR
5	Dimitrios Xynadas	Greece	27.20	17	7	NR
7	Hendrik Feldwehr	Germany	27.25	15	5	NR
8	Barry Murphy	Ireland	27.26	12	7	NR
9	Mark Gangloff	USA	27.27	15	3	
9	Johannes Neumann	Germany	27.27	16	3	
11	Emil Tahirovič	Slovenia	27.29	17	5	
12	João Gomes Jr.	Brazil	27.30	15	4	
13	Čaba Silađi	Serbia	27.35	14	5	
14	Oleg Lisogor	Ukraine	27.37	17	1	
15	Viktor Vabishchevich	Belarus	27.38	14	4	
16	Yuki Honda	Japan	27.43	15	6	AS
17	Scott Dickens	Canada	27.45	16	1	NR
18	Igor Borysik	Ukraine	27.48	15	7	
19	Ryo Tateishi	Japan	27.52	16	6	
20	Giedrius Titenis	Lithuania	27.57	13	0	NR
20	Vladislav Polyakov	Kazakhstan	27.57	15	1	
22	Petr Bartunek	Czech Republic	27.58	14	7	
23	Filippo Magnini	Italy	27.59	16	2	
24	Michael Malul	Israel	27.60	17	0	
25	Lennart Stekelenburg	Netherlands	27.63	16	8	
26	Robin van Aggele	Netherlands	27.64	17	2	
27	Alejandro Jacobo	Mexico	27.71	14	2	NR
28	Glenn Snyders	New Zealand	27.73	15	0	NR
29	James Gibson	Great Britain	27.78	13	5	
29	Alexander Dale Oen	Norway	27.78	17	8	
31	Stanislav Lakhtyukhov	Russia	27.79	13	2	
32	Damien Courtois	Switzerland	27.81	14	6	
33	Indra Gunawan	Indonesia	27.82	13	3	
33	Mathieu Bois	Canada	27.82	14	8	
35	Yevgeniy Ryzhkov	Kazakhstan	27.83	12	6	
36	Sławomir Wolniak	Poland	27.86	14	3	NR
37	Christian Sprenger	Australia	27.88	16	7	
38	Sandeep Sejwal	India	27.92	10	9	
39	Dragos Agache	Romania	27.93	16	9	
40	Hunor Mate	Austria	28.00	13	6	NR
41	Jakob Sveinsson	Iceland	28.03	11	3	NR
42	Genaro Prono	Paraguay	28.05	13	4	
43	Kristopher Gilchrist	Great Britain	28.07	11	7	
44	Maxim Podoprigora	Austria	28.09	12	9	
44	Malick Fall	Senegal	28.09	14	0	
46	Grigory Falko	Russia	28.10	11	4	
47	Martti Aljand	Estonia	28.14	15	9	
48	Wang Shuai	China	28.16	12	5	
49	Martin Melconian	Uruguay	28.22	12	1	NR
50	Adam Klein	USA	28.24	14	9	
51	Thabang Moeketsane	South Africa	28.27	12	8	
52	Filipp Provorkov	Estonia	28.39	10	7	
52	Gonzalo Acuna	Argentina	28.39	12	4	NR
54	Dániel Gyurta	Hungary	28.41	12	0	
55	Ivan Demyanenko	Uzbekistan	28.42	11	5	
56	David Szele	Hungary	28.47	15	8	
57	Vaidotas Blazys	Lithuania	28.52	10	2	
58	Joshua Arreguin	Mexico	28.58	13	1	
59	Jorge Murillo	Colombia	28.62	13	8	NR
60	Parker Lam	Singapore	28.66	10	1	NR
60	Dinko Geshev	Bulgaria	28.66	11	0	
60	Andrew Bree	Ireland	28.66	11	2	
63	Benjamin Le Maguet	Switzerland	28.72	12	3	
64	Laurent Carnol	Luxembourg	28.75	10	8	
65	Xue Jiajia	China	28.89	16	0	
66	Chan Wing Lim Eric	Hong Kong	28.96	10	5	
67	Édgar Crespo	Panama	29.01	13	9	
68	Terrence Haynes	Barbados	29.03	11	1	
69	Rodion Davelaar	Netherlands Antilles	29.04	7	6	
70	Tomáš Klobučník	Slovakia	29.08	10	3	
70	Vorrawuti Aumpiwan	Thailand	29.08	13	7	
72	Diego Santander Caballero	Chile	29.12	10	6	
73	Daniel Velez	Puerto Rico	29.16	8	4	
74	Jani Rusi	Finland	29.19	9	0	
75	Ömer Aslanoğlu	Turkey	29.23	11	6	
76	Sergiu Postica	Moldova	29.26	14	1	
77	Sławomir Kuczko	Poland	29.34	10	0	
78	Renato Prono Fernandez	Paraguay	29.37	11	8	
79	Hocine Haciane	Andorra	29.38	9	3	NR
80	Agnishwar Jayaprakash	India	29.39	8	2	
81	Brad Hamilton	Jamaica	29.40	8	9	NR
82	Ng Jia Hao	Singapore	29.41	9	4	
83	Timothy Ferris	Zimbabwe	29.48	7	4	
84	Tudor Postolachi	Moldova	29.53	9	5	
85	Julian Fletcher	Bermuda	29.56	7	5	NR
86	Rainui Teriipaia	Tahiti	29.57	9	6	
87	Wong Chun Yan	Hong Kong	29.61	9	2	
88	Ma Chan Wai	Macau	29.71	9	7	
89	Abdulrahman Albader	Kuwait	29.75	9	1	
90	Pedro Luna Llamosas	Peru	29.89	8	7	NR
91	Nazih Mezayek	Jordan	30.04	8	1	
92	Eric Arturo Medina	Panama	30.21	6	4	
93	Wang Wei-Wen	Chinese Taipei	30.40	9	9	
94	Wael Koubrousli	Lebanon	30.43	8	6	
95	Byron Briedenhann	Namibia	30.55	6	9	
95	Andrea Agius	Malta	30.55	7	7	
97	Erik Rajohnson	Madagascar	30.64	7	8	
98	Hemra Nurmyradov	Turkmenistan	30.72	9	8	
99	Awolowo Shedrack	Nigeria	30.82	7	3	
100	Dmitrii Aleksandrov	Kyrgyzstan	30.85	11	9	
101	Mubarak Al-Besher	United Arab Emirates	30.92	7	0	
102	Maximilian Siedentopf	Namibia	30.94	6	3	
103	Andranik Harutyunyan	Armenia	30.97	6	2	
104	Vaughn Forsythe	Barbados	31.06	6	5	
105	Peter James Lynch	Zambia	31.26	6	7	
106	Humoud Alhumoud	Kuwait	31.36	8	8	
107	Boldbaatar Butekhuils	Mongolia	31.41	8	5	
108	Eli Ebenezer Wong	Northern Mariana Islands	31.62	5	3	NR
109	Filip Velkovski	Macedonia	31.64	1	5	
110	Diguan Pigot	Suriname	31.70	6	6	
111	Kevin Cheung	Mauritius	31.80	5	5	
112	Kailan Staal	Northern Mariana Islands	31.90	5	4	
113	Ian Bond Nakmai	Papua New Guinea	31.93	6	0	
114	Norayr Ghazaryan	Armenia	32.08	7	9	
115	Lao Kuan Fong	Macau	32.11	7	1	
116	Jamie Peterkin	Saint Lucia	32.13	5	2	NR
116	Ivo Chilaule	Mozambique	32.13	5	7	
116	Ronny Vencatachellum	Mauritius	32.13	6	1	
119	Petero Okotai	Cook Islands	32.23	3	5	
120	Timur Kartabaev	Kyrgyzstan	32.28	8	3	
121	Jonny Bishop	Marshall Islands	32.64	4	4	
122	Jurgen Fici	Albania	33.08	5	6	
123	Serdar Mopyyev	Turkmenistan	33.16	5	8	
124	Shailesh Shumsher Rana	Nepal	33.42	5	1	
125	Julien Brice	Saint Lucia	33.46	4	1	
126	Douglas Miller	Fiji	33.53	5	9	
127	Kerson Hadley	Federated States of Micronesia	33.57	4	8	
127	Ganzi Mugula	Uganda	33.57	4	9	
129	Evan Isam Jameel Balyos	Iraq	33.60	3	6	
130	Adama Ouedraogo	Burkina Faso	33.93	2	0	
131	Mark Paul Thompson	Zambia	33.98	5	0	
132	Ron Roucou	Seychelles	34.28	4	2	
133	Siu Kent Chung	Brunei	34.53	4	7	
134	Shawn Brady	Marshall Islands	34.61	4	0	
135	Dionisio Augustine	Federated States of Micronesia	34.65	3	1	
136	Mohamed Coulibaly	Mali	35.10	2	5	
137	Abib Sereme	Mali	35.51	1	4	
138	Sharif Kakooza	Uganda	35.55	4	6	
139	Omar Abdalla	Tanzania	36.02	3	7	
140	Ibrahim Maliki	Niger	36.20	2	7	
141	Robert Scanlan	American Samoa	36.31	3	4	
142	Boubacar Alou Moussa	Niger	37.20	2	4	
143	Inayath Hassan	Maldives	37.42	3	2	
144	Ousmane Nani	Niger	37.91	2	8	
145	Abdoulkader Houssein	Djibouti	39.09	3	8	
146	Enea Murataj	Albania	40.17	3	3	
147	Saido Kamilov	Tajikistan	40.88	6	8	
148	Pascal Zoundi	Burkina Faso	42.08	1	3	
–	Aiah Emerson Mansa Musai	Sierra Leone	DNS	2	1	
–	Abu Bakarr Jalloh	Sierra Leone	DNS	2	2	
–	Mamadou Cisse	Guinea	DNS	2	3	
–	Hassan Ahmed Harbi	Djibouti	DNS	3	9	
–	Habonimana Yves	Burundi	DNS	4	3	
–	Nduwimana Etienne	Burundi	DNS	4	5	
–	Mohammad Alirezaei	Iran	DNS	17	9	
–	Yacoub Bilal Salem	Mauritania	DSQ	3	0	
–	Hycinth Cijntje	Netherlands Antilles	DSQ	7	2	
–	Eric Williams	Nigeria	DSQ	8	0	
–	Nguyen Huu Viet	Vietnam	DSQ	10	4	
–	Sofiane Daid	Algeria	DSQ	12	2	
–	Eetu Karvonen	Finland	DSQ	17	6	

=== Semifinals ===
Rank	Name	Nationality	Time	Heat	Lane	Notes
1	Cameron van der Burgh	South Africa	26.74	2	4	WR
2	Hendrik Feldwehr	Germany	26.83	2	6	ER
3	Felipe França Silva	Brazil	26.92	1	4	
4	Brenton Rickard	Australia	27.13	2	5	OC
5	João Gomes Jr.	Brazil	27.16	1	7	
5	Matjaž Markič	Slovenia	27.16	1	5	
7	Emil Tahirovič	Slovenia	27.19	2	7	
8	Mark Gangloff	United States	27.24	2	2	
9	Alessandro Terrin	Italy	27.30	2	3	
9	Viktor Vabishchevich	Belarus	27.30	2	8	
11	Oleg Lisogor	Ukraine	27.33	1	1	
12	Čaba Silađi	Serbia	27.37	2	1	
13	Barry Murphy	Ireland	27.38	1	6	
14	Dimitrios Xynadas	Greece	27.40	1	3	
15	Johannes Neumann	Germany	27.43	1	2	
15	Yuki Honda	Japan	27.43	1	8	=AS

=== Final ===
Rank	Name	Nationality	Time	Lane	Notes
1st place, gold medalist(s)	Cameron van der Burgh	South Africa	26.67	4	WR
2nd place, silver medalist(s)	Felipe França Silva	Brazil	26.76	3	AM
3rd place, bronze medalist(s)	Mark Gangloff	United States	26.86	8	NR
4	Hendrik Feldwehr	Germany	26.95	5	
4	Brenton Rickard	Australia	26.95	6	OC
6	Matjaž Markič	Slovenia	27.10	7	
7	Emil Tahirovič	Slovenia	27.31	1	
7	João Gomes Jr.	Brazil	27.31	2	

== See also ==
- Swimming at the 2007 World Aquatics Championships – Men's 50 metre breaststroke
