= Swimming at the 2009 World Aquatics Championships – Men's 100 metre breaststroke =

Men's 100 metre breaststroke at the 2009 FINA World Championships
- Venue: Foro Italico
- Dates: 26 July 2009 (heats, semifinals); 27 July 2009 (final)
- Competitors: 143
- Winning time: 58.58

Medalists
gold medal	Brenton Rickard	Australia
silver medal	Hugues Duboscq	France
bronze medal	Cameron van der Burgh	South Africa

The heats for the men's 100 metre breaststroke race at the 2009 World Championships took place in the morning and evening of 26 July and the final took place in the evening session of 27 July at the Foro Italico in Rome, Italy.

== Records ==
Prior to this competition, the existing world and competition records were as follows:

World record	Kosuke Kitajima (JPN)	58.91	Beijing, China	11 August 2008
Championship record	Brendan Hansen (USA)	59.37	Montreal, Canada	29 July 2005

The following records were established during the competition:

Date	Round	Name	Nationality	Time	Record
26 July	Heat 14	Brenton Rickard	Australia	58.98	CR
26 July	Semifinal 2	Eric Shanteau	United States	58.96	CR
27 July	Final	Brenton Rickard	Australia	58.58	WR

== Results ==
=== Heats ===
Rank	Name	Nationality	Time	Heat	Lane	Notes
1	Brenton Rickard	Australia	58.98	14	6	CR, OC
2	Hugues Duboscq	France	59.01	14	5	ER
3	Eric Shanteau	United States	59.05	15	3	
4	Giedrius Titenis	Lithuania	59.24	14	2	NR
5	Igor Borysik	Ukraine	59.34	15	4	
6	Henrique Barbosa	Brazil	59.49	13	4	
7	Hendrik Feldwehr	Germany	59.52	13	5	
7	Christian Sprenger	Australia	59.52	13	7	
9	Cameron van der Burgh	South Africa	59.54	15	2	AF
10	Mark Gangloff	United States	59.67	14	4	
11	James Gibson	Great Britain	59.68	15	7	NR
12	Ryo Tateishi	Japan	59.69	14	3	
13	Damir Dugonjič	Slovenia	59.89	15	1	
14	Yuta Suenaga	Japan	59.95	13	6	
15	Alexander Dale Oen	Norway	1:00.05	15	5	
15	Johannes Neumann	Germany	1:00.05	15	6	
17	Valerii Dymo	Ukraine	1:00.13	13	9	
18	Čaba Silađi	Serbia	1:00.20	13	8	
19	Mathieu Bois	Canada	1:00.23	15	8	=NR
20	Dániel Gyurta	Hungary	1:00.26	12	7	NR
21	Scott Dickens	Canada	1:00.31	14	7	
22	Lennart Stekelenburg	Netherlands	1:00.36	13	3	
23	Grigory Falko	Russia	1:00.47	12	3	
24	Luca Pizzini	Italy	1:00.54	14	0	
25	Martti Aljand	Estonia	1:00.56	10	3	NR
26	Glenn Snyders	New Zealand	1:00.77	13	2	
27	Hunor Mate	Austria	1:00.78	12	4	NR
28	Kristopher Gilchrist	Great Britain	1:00.81	14	8	
29	Vladislav Polyakov	Kazakhstan	1:00.83	14	9	
30	João Gomes Jr.	Brazil	1:00.88	14	1	
31	Stanislav Lakhtyukhov	Russia	1:00.95	15	9	
32	Yevgeniy Ryzhkov	Kazakhstan	1:01.02	12	0	
33	Melquiades Alvarez	Spain	1:01.07	13	1	
34	Mattia Pesce	Italy	1:01.18	15	0	
35	Sandeep Sejwal	India	1:01.20	11	2	NR
36	Romanos Alyfantis	Greece	1:01.27	12	6	
37	Jakob Jóhann Sveinsson	Iceland	1:01.32	11	8	NR
37	Matjaž Markič	Slovenia	1:01.32	12	1	
39	Slawomir Wolniak	Poland	1:01.39	13	0	
40	Thabang Moeketsane	South Africa	1:01.40	10	1	
41	Dimitrios Xynadas	Greece	1:01.44	11	6	
42	Zhang Guoying	China	1:01.53	12	2	
43	Petr Bartunek	Czech Republic	1:01.59	10	0	
43	Maxim Podoprigora	Austria	1:01.59	12	9	
45	Alejandro Jacobo	Mexico	1:01.60	11	0	NR
46	Dinko Geshev	Bulgaria	1:01.72	9	8	
47	Sofiane Daid	Algeria	1:01.74	11	7	NR
48	Barry Murphy	Ireland	1:01.76	9	3	=NR
49	Andrew Bree	Ireland	1:01.78	9	6	
50	Jorge Murillo	Colombia	1:01.79	10	4	NR
51	Malick Fall	Senegal	1:01.80	11	3	
52	Wang Shuai	China	1:01.84	11	5	
53	Nguyen Huu Viet	Vietnam	1:02.17	9	7	
54	Laurent Carnol	Luxembourg	1:02.27	10	2	
55	Chris Christensen	Denmark	1:02.41	10	7	NR
56	Carlos Almeida	Portugal	1:02.46	7	9	
57	Joshua Arreguin	Mexico	1:02.58	11	9	
58	Gonzalo Acuna	Argentina	1:02.60	9	4	NR
59	Tomáš Klobučník	Slovakia	1:02.61	9	1	
60	Viktar Vabishchevich	Belarus	1:02.73	11	1	
61	Vaidotas Blazys	Lithuania	1:02.76	7	7	
62	Eetu Karvonen	Finland	1:02.83	8	7	
63	Genaro Prono	Paraguay	1:02.84	11	4	
64	Édgar Crespo	Panama	1:02.92	9	2	
65	Hocine Haciane	Andorra	1:02.94	9	0	NR
66	Sławomir Kuczko	Poland	1:03.00	12	5	
67	Dragos Agache	Romania	1:03.02	10	9	
68	Daniel Velez	Puerto Rico	1:03.19	12	8	
69	Ivan Demyanenko	Uzbekistan	1:03.24	8	6	
70	Diego Santander Caballero	Chile	1:03.49	7	2	
71	Chan Wing Lim Eric	Hong Kong	1:03.68	8	2	
72	Matthew Charles Smith	Estonia	1:03.71	8	1	
73	Martin Andres Melconian Alvez	Uruguay	1:03.77	7	4	NR
74	Tom Beeri	Israel	1:03.94	10	5	
75	Benjamin Le Maguet	Switzerland	1:04.02	10	8	
76	Renato David Prono Fernandez	Paraguay	1:04.06	10	6	
77	Mohammad Alirezaei	Iran	1:04.16	9	5	
78	Abdulrahman Albader	Kuwait	1:04.31	8	0	
79	Sergiu Postica	Moldova	1:04.76	8	3	
80	Indra Gunawan	Indonesia	1:04.79	8	5	
81	Wang Wei-Wen	Chinese Taipei	1:04.86	7	3	
82	Tan Jinwen Mark	Singapore	1:05.02	7	6	
83	Agnishwar Jayaprakash	India	1:05.07	6	2	
84	Vorrawuti Aumpiwan	Thailand	1:05.17	9	9	
85	Ömer Aslanoglu	Turkey	1:05.55	8	9	
86	Pedro Pinotes	Angola	1:05.65	4	7	
87	Wael Koubrousli	Lebanon	1:05.71	6	3	
88	Wong Chun Yan	Hong Kong	1:05.87	5	5	
89	Aleksey Derlyugov	Uzbekistan	1:05.95	6	7	
90	Juan Guerra	El Salvador	1:06.07	6	5	
91	Ng Jia Hao	Singapore	1:06.21	8	8	
92	Pedro Luna Llamosas	Peru	1:06.39	6	1	
93	Rainui Teriipaia	Tahiti	1:06.72	8	4	
94	Mubarak Al-Besher	United Arab Emirates	1:06.81	4	5	
95	Yousuf Essa Al Yousuf	Saudi Arabia	1:06.84	6	6	
96	Dmitrii Aleksandrov	Kyrgyzstan	1:07.03	7	1	
97	Timothy Ferris	Zimbabwe	1:07.12	5	6	
98	Maximilian Siedentopf	Namibia	1:07.39	4	6	
99	Ma Chan Wai	Macau	1:07.46	6	8	
100	Humoud Alhumoud	Kuwait	1:07.54	7	0	
101	Julian Fletcher	Bermuda	1:07.70	5	4	
102	Tudor Postolachi	Moldova	1:07.73	6	4	
103	Erik Rajohnson	Madagascar	1:08.09	6	9	
104	Filip Velkovski	Macedonia	1:08.34	1	2	
105	Nazih Mezayek	Jordan	1:08.58	5	3	
106	Eli Ebenezer Wong	Northern Mariana Islands	1:08.79	4	2	NR
107	Andranik Harutyunyan	Armenia	1:08.93	5	1	
108	Hemra Nurmyradov	Turkmenistan	1:09.25	5	8	
109	Eric Williams	Nigeria	1:09.34	5	2	
110	Diguan Pigot	Suriname	1:09.41	4	3	
111	Ian Bond Wolongkatop Nakmai	Papua New Guinea	1:09.64	4	1	
112	Andres Castillo	Panama	1:09.70	3	5	
113	Zane Jordan	Zambia	1:09.77	5	7	
114	Andrea Agius	Malta	1:09.81	5	0	
115	Peter James Lynch	Zambia	1:09.94	3	4	
116	Timur Kartabaev	Kyrgyzstan	1:10.14	6	0	
117	Kevin Cheung	Mauritius	1:10.25	4	0	
118	Ronny Vencatachellum	Mauritius	1:10.36	4	8	
119	Vincent Perry	Tahiti	1:10.73	3	3	
120	Awolowo Solomon Shedrack	Nigeria	1:10.89	5	9	
121	Mamadou Cisse	Guinea	1:11.59	2	8	
122	Norayr Ghazaryan	Armenia	1:12.22	4	4	
123	Pablo Navarrete	Nicaragua	1:12.32	3	6	
124	Boldbaatar Butekhuils	Mongolia	1:13.06	4	9	
125	Michael Taylor	Marshall Islands	1:13.61	3	1	
126	Shailesh Shumsher Rana	Nepal	1:13.65	3	7	
127	Serdar Mopyyev	Turkmenistan	1:13.76	3	0	
128	Jonny Bishop	Marshall Islands	1:14.07	3	8	
129	Evan Isam Jameel Balyos	Iraq	1:14.77	2	0	
130	Jurgen Fici	Albania	1:16.82	3	2	
131	Ganzi Mugula	Uganda	1:16.96	2	5	
132	Ron Roucou	Seychelles	1:17.38	2	4	
133	Nadir Elmofti	Libya	1:18.34	2	2	
134	Abib Sereme	Mali	1:19.36	1	6	
135	Sharif Kakooza	Uganda	1:20.72	3	9	
136	Omar Abdalla	Tanzania	1:23.27	1	4	
137	Sonenina Phamixay	Laos	1:24.61	1	3	
138	Robert Scanlan	American Samoa	1:27.19	2	7	
139	Saido Kamilov	Tajikistan	1:31.41	7	5	
140	Said Seba	Tanzania	1:32.85	2	9	
141	Abdoulkader Mohamed Houssein	Djibouti	1:33.32	2	3	
142	Mohamed Osman Bourhanta	Djibouti	1:34.54	2	6	
—	Nduwimana Etienne	Burundi	DNS	2	1	

=== Semifinals ===
Rank	Name	Nationality	Time	Heat	Lane	Notes
1	Eric Shanteau	United States	58.96	2	7	CR, AM
2	Cameron van der Burgh	South Africa	59.13	2	2	AF
3	Hendrik Feldwehr	Germany	59.15	2	6	NR
4	Brenton Rickard	Australia	59.27	2	4	
5	Igor Borysik	Ukraine	59.39	2	3	
6	Giedrius Titenis	Lithuania	59.43	1	5	
7	Hugues Duboscq	France	59.46	1	4	
8	Henrique Barbosa	Brazil	59.60	1	3	
9	Ryo Tateishi	Japan	59.61	1	7	
10	Damir Dugonjič	Slovenia	59.66	2	1	
11	Mark Gangloff	United States	59.71	1	2	
12	Johannes Neumann	Germany	59.85	1	8	
13	Alexander Dale Oen	Norway	59.90	2	8	
14	James Gibson	Great Britain	59.91	2	7	
15	Yuta Suenaga	Japan	59.98	1	1	
15	Christian Sprenger	Australia	59.98	1	6	

=== Final ===
Rank	Name	Nationality	Lane	Time	Notes
1st place, gold medalist(s)	Brenton Rickard	Australia	6	58.58	WR
2nd place, silver medalist(s)	Hugues Duboscq	France	1	58.64	ER
3rd place, bronze medalist(s)	Cameron van der Burgh	South Africa	5	58.95	AF
4	Eric Shanteau	United States	4	58.98	
5	Igor Borysik	Ukraine	2	59.23	
6	Giedrius Titenis	Lithuania	7	59.27	
7	Hendrik Feldwehr	Germany	3	59.33	
8	Henrique Barbosa	Brazil	8	59.54	
