= Swimming at the 2009 World Aquatics Championships – Men's 4 × 100 metre medley relay =

Men's 4 × 100 metre medley relay at the 2009 FINA World Championships
- Venue: Foro Italico
- Date: 2 August 2009
- Teams: 47
- Winning time: 3:27.28 WR

Medalists
gold medal	United States; Aaron Peirsol, Eric Shanteau, Michael Phelps, David Walters, Matt Grevers*, Mark Gangloff*, Tyler McGill*, Nathan Adrian*
silver medal	Germany; Helge Meeuw, Hendrik Feldwehr, Benjamin Starke, Paul Biedermann
bronze medal	Australia; Ashley Delaney, Brenton Rickard, Andrew Lauterstein, Matt Targett, Christian Sprenger* * Swimmers who participated in the heats only

The men's 4 × 100 metre medley relay at the 2009 World Aquatics Championships took place on 2 August 2009 at the Foro Italico in Rome, Italy.

== Records ==
Prior to this competition, the existing world and competition records were as follows:

World Record	United States; Aaron Peirsol (53.16); Brendan Hansen (59.27); Michael Phelps (50.15); Jason Lezak (46.76)	3:29.34	Beijing, China	17 August 2008
Championship Record	United States; Aaron Peirsol (53.71); Brendan Hansen (59.61); Ian Crocker (50.39); Jason Lezak (47.83)	3:31.54	Barcelona, Spain	27 July 2003

The following records were established during the competition:

Date	Round	Nation	Time	Record
2 August	Heat 3	Germany; Helge Meeuw (52.46); Hendrik Feldwehr (58.22); Benjamin Starke (51.11); Paul Biedermann (47.69)	3:29.48	CR
2 August	Final	United States; Aaron Peirsol (52.19) CR; Eric Shanteau (58.57); Michael Phelps (49.72); David Walters (46.80)	3:27.28	WR

== Results ==
=== Heats ===
Rank	Heat	Lane	Nation	Swimmers	Time	Notes
1	3	7	Germany	Helge Meeuw (52.46) NR; Hendrik Feldwehr (58.22); Benjamin Starke (51.11); Paul Biedermann (47.69)	3:29.48	CR, ER
2	4	4	Australia	Ashley Delaney (53.29); Christian Sprenger (58.88); Andrew Lauterstein (50.16); Matt Targett (47.51)	3:29.84	OC
3	5	4	United States	Matt Grevers (53.20); Mark Gangloff (58.68); Tyler McGill (50.82); Nathan Adrian (47.24)	3:29.94	
4	3	6	France	Jérémy Stravius (53.90); Hugues Duboscq (58.75); Clement Lefert (50.58); Alain Bernard (46.86)	3:30.09	NR
5	4	3	Brazil	Guilherme Guido (53.61) SA; Henrique Barbosa (58.84); Gabriel Mangabeira (50.16); Nicolas Oliveira (47.64)	3:30.25	SA
6	5	5	Russia	Arkady Vyatchanin (53.27); Grigory Falko (59.64); Yevgeny Korotyshkin (50.45); Yevgeny Lagunov (47.19)	3:30.55	NR
7	3	5	United Kingdom	Liam Tancock (53.49); James Gibson (59.11); Michael Rock (50.71); Simon Burnett (47.37)	3:30.68	NR
8	3	4	Japan	Ryosuke Irie (52.50); Ryo Tateishi (59.26); Takuro Fujii (50.52); Rammaru Harada (48.46)	3:30.74	AS
9	5	2	Canada	Pascal Wollach (53.90); Mathieu Bois (58.86); Joe Bartoch (51.39); Brent Hayden (46.87)	3:31.02	NR
10	5	3	South Africa	George Du Rand (53.90); Cameron van der Burgh (58.32); Lyndon Ferns (52.06); Graeme Moore (47.25)	3:31.53	AF
11	4	5	New Zealand	Daniel Bell (53.85) NR; Glenn Snyders (59.75); Corney Swanepoel (50.45); Cameron Gibson (47.53)	3:31.58	NR
12	3	3	Spain	Aschwin Wildeboer (52.70); Melquiades Alvarez (59.15); Rafael Muñoz (50.52); Jose Antonio Alonso (49.74)	3:32.11	NR
13	5	6	Italy	Enrico Catalano (54.76); Luca Pizzini (1:00.12); Mattia Nalesso (51.80); Christian Galenda (46.74)	3:33.42	NR
14	4	6	Greece	Aristeidis Grigoriadis (54.08); Romanos Alyfantis (1:00.87); Stefanos Dimitriadis (51.87); Ioannis Kalargaris (48.51)	3:35.33	
15	4	0	Lithuania	Vytautas Janušaitis (54.77); Giedrius Titenis (59.26); Rimvydas Salcius (52.80); Paulius Viktoravicius (48.57)	3:35.40	NR
16	4	7	China	He Jianbin (55.05); Zhang Guoying (1:01.18); Zhou Jiawei (51.03); Chen Zuo (48.60)	3:35.86	NR
17	5	8	Israel	Guy Barnea (54.29); Tom Be'eri (1:01.75); Alon Mandel (51.60); Nimrod Shapira Bar Or (48.59)	3:36.23	NR
18	1	8	Slovenia	Robi Zbogar (56.41); Damir Dugonjič (1:00.17); Peter Mankoč (50.86); Jernej Godec (49.35)	3:36.79	
19	1	7	Ukraine	Andriy Kovbasa (56.21); Igor Borysik (59.52); Denys Dubrov (51.87); Andrii Govorov (49.39)	3:36.99	
20	1	4	Czech Republic	Tomas Fucik (55.88); Petr Bartunek (1:01.28); Michal Rubáček (51.26); Martin Verner (48.68)	3:37.10	NR
21	4	2	Romania	Răzvan Florea (54.45); Dragos Agache (1:01.51); Alexandru Felix Maestru (53.18); Norbert Trandafir (48.43)	3:37.57	NR
21	5	7	Belarus	Pavel Sankovich (54.57); Viktor Vabishchevich (1:01.32); Evgeny Lazuka (51.74); Andrei Radzionau (49.94)	3:37.57	
23	4	1	Kazakhstan	Stanislav Osinsky (56.73); Vladislav Polyakov (59.59); Rustam Khudiyev (53.51); Stanislav Kuzmin (48.82)	3:38.65	NR
24	2	4	Ireland	Karl Burdis (54.44) NR; Barry Murphy (1:00.92); Conor Leaney (54.93); Ryan Harrison (49.58)	3:39.87	NR
25	1	6	Switzerland	Flori Lang (55.41); Benjamin Le Maguet (1:03.12); Damien Courtois (53.92); Gregory Widmer (48.65)	3:41.10	NR
26	5	0	Estonia	Andres Olvik (56.80); Martti Aljand (1:00.89); Sten Indrikson (54.81); Vladimir Sidorkin (50.62)	3:43.12	
27	5	9	Uzbekistan	Danil Bugakov (56.93); Ivan Demyanenko (1:02.73); Sergey Pankov (55.38); Daniil Tulupov (50.19)	3:45.23	
28	3	1	Colombia	Omar Pinzón (55.29); Jorge Murillo (1:03.82); Carlos Vivero (55.89); Julio Galofre (51.45)	3:46.45	NR
29	4	8	Singapore	Ng Kai Wee Rainer (57.33); Tan Jinwen Mark (1:04.84); Tan Xue Wei Nicholas (55.07); Lim Clement (51.50)	3:48.74	NR
30	2	6	India	Ashwin Menon (1:00.83); Sandeep Sejwal (1:02.28); Rehan Poncha (55.52); Virdhawal Khade (50.22)	3:48.85	
31	3	8	Philippines	Charles William Walker (58.92); Miguel Molina (1:03.87); James Walsh (55.63); Daniel Coakley (51.23)	3:49.65	
32	4	9	Peru	Sebastian Jahnsen Madico (1:00.98); Pedro Luna Llamosas (1:06.88); Emmanuel Crescimbeni (55.29); Sebastian Arispe Silva (52.20)	3:55.35	NR
33	3	9	Macau	Tong Antonio (1:01.00); Ma Chan Wai (1:07.84); Wong Wing Cheung Victor (55.56); Lao Kuan Fong (53.04)	3:57.44	
34	2	2	Senegal	Matar Samb (1:04.43); Malick Fall (1:00.48); Papa Madiop Ndong (1:01.19); Abdoul Khadre Mbaye Niane (52.60)	3:58.70	
35	2	3	United Arab Emirates	Mohammed Al Ghaferi (1:02.12); Mubarak Al-Besher (1:07.18); Obaid Al-Jasmi (56.91); Saeed Al Jasmi (54.16)	4:00.37	
36	2	5	Armenia	Khachik Plavchyan (1:01.08); Andranik Harutyunyan (1:10.46); Mikayel Koloyan (57.82); Harutyun Harutyunyan (55.53)	4:04.89	NR
37	2	7	Papua New Guinea	Ryan Pini (55.80); Ian Bond Wolongkatop Nakmai (1:10.99); Peter Popahun Pokawin (1:03.53); Daniel Kevin Pryke (55.30)	4:05.62	
38	1	5	Malta	Mark Sammut (1:04.59); Andrea Agius (1:08.51); Neil Agius (59.42); Edward Caruana Dingli (55.97)	4:08.49	
39	1	2	Tahiti	Vincent Perry (1:06.05); Rainui Teriipaia (1:06.79); Heimanu Sichan (1:00.93); Anthony Clark (55.01)	4:08.78	
40	2	8	Albania	Sidni Hoxha (1:05.41); Jurgen Fici (1:16.19); Endi Babi (58.20); Jon Pepaj (56.33)	4:16.13	
41	1	3	Mozambique	Leonel Matonse (1:06.20); Ivo Chilaule (1:13.45); Gerusio Matonse (1:05.38); Patricio Vera (56.78)	4:21.81	
42	2	0	Northern Mariana Islands	Kailan Staal (1:09.11); Eli Ebenezer Wong (1:08.28); Cooper Graf (1:10.20); Shin Kimura (1:02.18)	4:29.77	
-	2	9	Croatia		DNS	
-	3	0	Kuwait		DNS	
-	5	1	Uruguay		DNS	
-	2	1	Mauritius	Ronny Vencatachellum; Kevin Cheung; Jean Marie Froget; Jean Hugues Gregoire	DQ	
-	3	2	Netherlands	Nick Driebergen; Lennart Stekelenburg; Joeri Verlinden; Sebastiaan Verschuren	DQ	

=== Final ===
Rank	Lane	Nation	Swimmers	Time	Note
1st place, gold medalist(s)	3	United States	Aaron Peirsol (52.19) CR; Eric Shanteau (58.57); Michael Phelps (49.72); David Walters (46.80)	3:27.28	WR
2nd place, silver medalist(s)	4	Germany	Helge Meeuw (52.27) ER; Hendrik Feldwehr (58.51); Benjamin Starke (50.91); Paul Biedermann (46.89)	3:28.58	ER
3rd place, bronze medalist(s)	5	Australia	Ashley Delaney (53.10); Brenton Rickard (57.80); Andrew Lauterstein (50.58); Matt Targett (47.16)	3:28.64	OC
4	2	Brazil	Guilherme Guido (53.78); Henrique Barbosa (58.68); Gabriel Mangabeira (50.48); César Cielo Filho (46.22)	3:29.16	SA
5	6	France	Jérémy Stravius (53.96); Hugues Duboscq (58.54); Clement Lefert (50.97); Alain Bernard (46.26)	3:29.73	NR
6	7	Russia	Arkady Vyatchanin (52.57) NR; Grigory Falko (1:00.00); Yevgeny Korotyshkin (50.57); Andrey Grechin (47.46)	3:30.60	
7	8	Japan	Junya Koga (52.90); Ryo Tateishi (58.90); Takuro Fujii (50.68); Rammaru Harada (48.43)	3:30.91	
-	1	United Kingdom	Liam Tancock (53.71); James Gibson (59.46); Michael Rock; Simon Burnett	DSQ	
