= 2010 FINA World Swimming Championships (25 m) – Men's 100 metre breaststroke =

Men's 100m Breaststroke at the 2010 Short Course Worlds
- Dates: 15 December 2010 (heats and semifinals); 16 December 2010 (final)
- Competitors: 85
- Winning time: 56.80

Medalists
gold medal	Cameron van der Burgh	South Africa
silver medal	Fabio Scozzoli	Italy
bronze medal	Felipe França Silva	Brazil

The Men's 100 Breaststroke at the 10th FINA World Swimming Championships (25m) was swum 15–16 December 2010 in Dubai, United Arab Emirates. On 15 December, 85 individuals swam in the Preliminary heats in the morning, with the top-16 finishers advancing to swim again in the Semifinals that night. The top-8 finishers from the Semifinals then advanced to swim in the Final the next evening.

At the start of the event, the existing World (WR) and Championship records (CR) were:

	Name	Nation	Time	Location	Date
WR	Cameron van der Burgh	South Africa	55.61	Berlin	15 November 2009
CR	Igor Borysik	Ukraine	57.74	Manchester	10 April 2008

The following records were established during the competition:

Date	Round	Name	Nation	Time	WR	CR
15 December 2010	Heats	Fabio Scozzoli	Italy	57.60		CR
15 December 2010	Semifinals	Mihail Alexandrov	United States	57.18		CR
16 December 2010	Final	Cameron van der Burgh	South Africa	56.80		CR

== Results ==
=== Heats ===
Rank	Heat	Lane	Name	Time	Notes
1	11	5	Fabio Scozzoli (ITA)	57.60	Q, CR
2	11	6	Vladislav Polyakov (KAZ)	57.80	Q
3	9	2	Mihail Alexandrov (USA)	58.06	Q
4	10	2	Mark Gangloff (USA)	58.21	Q
5	10	4	Dániel Gyurta (HUN)	58.31	Q
6	9	8	Hugues Duboscq (FRA)	58.42	Q
7	11	7	Naoya Tomita (JPN)	58.43	Q
8	10	3	Stanislav Lakhtyukhov (RUS)	58.56	Q
9	9	4	Felipe França Silva (BRA)	58.67	Q
10	10	8	Brenton Rickard (AUS)	58.68	Q
11	10	6	Cameron van der Burgh (RSA)	58.69	Q
12	9	7	Christian Sprenger (AUS)	58.79	Q
12	9	1	Lennart Stekelenburg (NED)	58.79	Q
14	7	4	Paul Kornfeld (CAN)	58.90	Q
15	7	3	Wang Shuai (CHN)	58.95	Q
15	8	3	Giedrius Titenis (LTU)	58.95	Q
17	11	2	Hendrik Feldwehr (GER)	58.97	
18	11	1	Marco Koch (GER)	59.02	
19	10	7	Igor Borysik (UKR)	59.04	
20	11	3	Martti Aljand (EST)	59.05	
21	10	5	Damir Dugonjič (SLO)	59.19	
22	11	8	Viatcheslav Sinkevich (RUS)	59.24	
23	7	5	Warren Barnes (CAN)	59.42	
24	9	5	Edoardo Giorgetti (ITA)	59.47	
25	7	2	Jakob Jóhann Sveinsson (ISL)	59.80	
26	8	6	Tomáš Klobučník (SVK)	59.86	
27	8	1	Laurent Carnol (LUX)	59.92	
27	8	8	Jakob Dorch (SWE)	59.92	
29	6	6	Édgar Crespo (PAN)	1:00.02	
30	8	2	Sławomir Kuczko (POL)	1:00.08	
31	7	7	Filipp Provorkov (EST)	1:00.23	
32	7	6	William Grant Diering (RSA)	1:00.28	
33	6	7	Jorge Murillo (COL)	1:00.32	
33	10	1	Yevgeniy Ryzhkov (KAZ)	1:00.32	
35	8	5	Viktor Vabishchevich (BLR)	1:00.51	
36	7	8	Nabil Kebbab (ALG)	1:00.70	
37	4	3	Dmitriy Shvetsov (UZB)	1:00.82	
38	4	5	Daniel Vacval (SVK)	1:00.91	
38	5	5	Tomáš Fucík (CZE)	1:00.91	
40	6	3	Bradley Ally (BAR)	1:00.93	
41	8	4	Sverre Naess (NOR)	1:00.94	
42	8	7	David Olivier Mercado (MEX)	1:01.02	
43	6	4	Sofiane Daid (ALG)	1:01.17	
44	1	2	Xue Ruipeng (CHN)	1:01.38	
45	1	5	Daniel Coakley (PHI)	1:01.66	
46	5	3	Martin Melconian (URU)	1:01.96	
47	6	5	Wing Lim Eric Chan (HKG)	1:02.00	
48	5	6	Timothy Ferris (ZIM)	1:02.03	
49	6	1	Dmitrii Aleksandrov (KGZ)	1:02.19	
50	7	1	Malick Fall (SEN)	1:02.30	
51	5	4	Vorrawuti Aumpiwan (THA)	1:02.51	
52	6	2	Chen Cho-Yi (TPE)	1:03.09	
53	6	8	Lim Duan Le Kenneth (SIN)	1:03.18	
54	4	6	Mubarak Al-Besher (UAE)	1:03.23	
55	5	8	Diego Santander (CHI)	1:03.33	
56	4	8	Andrea Agius (MLT)	1:03.38	
57	4	7	Leopoldo Andara (VEN)	1:03.53	
58	3	6	Hocine Haciane (AND)	1:03.57	
59	5	2	Juan Alberto Guerra Quiñonez (ESA)	1:03.93	
60	5	7	Sergiu Postica (MDA)	1:04.28	
61	3	8	Jourdy Martis (AHO)	1:05.12	
62	3	5	Jehaad Al Henidi (JOR)	1:05.14	
63	3	3	Nazih Mezayek (JOR)	1:05.50	
64	5	1	Arturo Alejandro Montilla (DOM)	1:05.66	
65	4	1	Mohamed Jasim (UAE)	1:06.20	
66	4	4	Wael Koubrousli (LIB)	1:06.33	
67	3	4	Chou Kit (MAC)	1:06.38	
68	3	2	Maximilian Siedentopf (NAM)	1:06.71	
69	2	4	Daniel Galea (MLT)	1:06.93	
70	3	1	Erik Rajohnson (MAD)	1:07.19	
71	3	7	Damir Davletbaev (KGZ)	1:07.81	
72	1	4	Ahmed Atari (QAT)	1:08.71	
73	2	3	Ronaldo Rodrigues (GUY)	1:10.02	
74	2	5	Hemra Nurmuradov (TKM)	1:10.23	
75	2	2	Jurgen Fici (ALB)	1:13.35	
76	2	6	Shailesh Shumsher Rana (NEP)	1:14.09	
77	1	6	Adama Ouedraogo (BUR)	1:14.39	
78	1	3	Mamadou Fofana (MLI)	1:15.04	
79	2	7	Ron Albert Roucou (SEY)	1:17.30	
80	2	1	Daisuke Ssegwanyi (UGA)	1:19.25	
81	2	8	Adam David Kitururu (TAN)	1:21.88	
-	4	2	Mohamed Shahjahan Ali (BAN)	DNS	
-	11	4	Robin van Aggele (NED)	DNS	
-	9	3	Caba Siladji (SRB)	DSQ	
-	9	6	Henrique Barbosa (BRA)	DSQ	

=== Semifinals ===
Semifinal 1

Rank	Lane	Name	Time	Notes
1	4	Vladislav Polyakov (KAZ)	58.34	Q
2	2	Brenton Rickard (AUS)	58.37	Swim-off
3	3	Hugues Duboscq (FRA)	58.46	
4	5	Mark Gangloff (USA)	58.48	
5	1	Paul Kornfeld (CAN)	58.58	
6	6	Stanislav Lakhtyukhov (RUS)	58.61	
7	8	Giedrius Titenis (LTU)	58.72	
8	7	Christian Sprenger (AUS)	59.21	

Semifinal 2

Rank	Lane	Name	Time	Notes
1	5	Mihail Alexandrov (USA)	57.18	Q, CR
2	2	Felipe França Silva (BRA)	57.19	Q
2	7	Cameron van der Burgh (RSA)	57.19	Q
4	4	Fabio Scozzoli (ITA)	57.35	Q
5	3	Dániel Gyurta (HUN)	57.84	Q
6	6	Naoya Tomita (JPN)	57.97	Q
7	8	Wang Shuai (CHN)	58.37	Swim-off
8	1	Lennart Stekelenburg (NED)	58.85	

Semifinals Swim-off

Rank	Lane	Name	Time	Notes
1	4	Brenton Rickard (AUS)	58.45	Q
2	5	Wang Shuai (CHN)	58.71	

=== Final ===
Rank	Lane	Name	Time	Notes
1st place, gold medalist(s)	3	Cameron van der Burgh (RSA)	56.80	CR
2nd place, silver medalist(s)	6	Fabio Scozzoli (ITA)	57.13	
3rd place, bronze medalist(s)	5	Felipe França Silva (BRA)	57.39	
4	4	Mihail Alexandrov (USA)	57.42	
5	8	Brenton Rickard (AUS)	57.79	
6	2	Dániel Gyurta (HUN)	58.16	
7	1	Vladislav Polyakov (KAZ)	58.66	
-	7	Naoya Tomita (JPN)	DQ	
