= Swimming at the 2011 World Aquatics Championships – Men's 50 metre breaststroke =

Men's 50 metre breaststroke at the 2011 World Aquatics Championships
- Dates: July 26, 2011 (heats and semifinals); July 27, 2011 (final)
- Competitors: 51 from 48 nations
- Winning time: 27.01

Medalists
gold medal	Felipe França Silva	Brazil
silver medal	Fabio Scozzoli	Italy
bronze medal	Cameron van der Burgh	South Africa

The men's 50 metre breaststroke competition of the swimming events at the 2011 World Aquatics Championships was held on July 26 with the heats and the semifinals and July 27 with the final.

== Records ==
Prior to the competition, the existing world and championship records were as follows.

	Name	Nation	Time	Location	Date
World record Championship record	Cameron van der Burgh	South Africa	26.67	Rome	July 29, 2009

== Results ==
=== Heats ===
51 swimmers participated in 7 heats.

Rank	Heat	Lane	Name	Nationality	Time	Notes
1	6	4	Felipe França Silva	Brazil	27.19	Q
2	5	3	Matjaž Markič	Slovenia	27.36	Q
3	7	5	Damir Dugonjič	Slovenia	27.47	Q
4	7	6	Mark Gangloff	United States	27.49	Q
5	6	6	Alexander Dale Oen	Norway	27.51	Q, NR
6	6	2	Glenn Snyders	New Zealand	27.52	Q, NR
7	7	4	Cameron van der Burgh	South Africa	27.58	Q
8	5	4	Hendrik Feldwehr	Germany	27.67	Q
9	6	3	Dragos Agache	Romania	27.75	Q
10	6	5	Fabio Scozzoli	Italy	27.84	Q
10	7	7	Aleksandr Triznov	Russia	27.84	Q
12	4	6	Petr Bartůněk	Czech Republic	27.86	Q
13	5	5	Brenton Rickard	Australia	27.89	Q
14	6	7	Čaba Silađi	Serbia	27.93	Q
15	7	3	Lennart Stekelenburg	Netherlands	27.95	Q
16	7	8	Vladislav Polyakov	Kazakhstan	28.00	Q
17	5	2	Ryo Tateishi	Japan	28.01	
18	5	6	Barry Murphy	Ireland	28.13	
19	4	4	Gu Biaorong	China	28.14	
20	6	1	Giedrius Titenis	Lithuania	28.14	
21	4	7	Édgar Crespo	Panama	28.15	
22	5	1	Mohammad Alirezaei	Iran	28.18	
23	7	2	Andrew Dickens	Canada	28.19	
24	4	1	Rodion Davelaar	Netherlands Antilles	28.21	
25	3	4	Amini Fonua	Tonga	28.23	
26	4	8	Nabil Kebbab	Algeria	28.25	NR
27	6	8	Malick Fall	Senegal	28.33	
28	4	5	Dawid Szulich	Poland	28.34	
29	4	3	Filipp Provorkov	Estonia	28.39	
30	4	2	Jakob Dorch	Sweden	28.42	
31	7	1	Valerii Dymo	Ukraine	28.44	
32	5	8	Iisakki Ratilainen	Finland	28.58	
33	3	5	Laurent Carnol	Luxembourg	28.63	NR
34	5	7	Indra Gunawan	Indonesia	28.81	
35	3	6	Tomáš Klobučník	Slovakia	28.95	
36	3	7	Julian Fletcher	Bermuda	29.11	
37	3	3	Diego Santander	Chile	29.85	
38	2	4	Mubarak Al-Besher	United Arab Emirates	30.02	
39	3	1	Andrea Agius	Malta	30.47	
40	3	2	Shajahan Ali	Bangladesh	30.88	
41	2	7	Mamadou Fofana	Mali	32.03	
42	2	2	Hemthon Ponloeu	Cambodia	33.48	
43	2	1	Fdingue Ekane	Cameroon	34.34	
44	2	6	Ganzi Mugula	Uganda	34.38	
45	2	3	Ruslan Oliftaev	Tajikistan	37.56	
46	3	8	Abdoulrahman Mohamed Osman	Djibouti	37.60	
47	1	3	Yao Messa Roger Amegbeto	Togo	41.43	
48	1	4	Mohamed Mamaiv Sani	Niger	41.86	
49	2	5	Iourhanta Mohamed Osman	Djibouti	43.37	
50	2	8	Razak Marafa	Niger	47.58	
	1	5	Mohamed Camara	Guinea	DSQ	

=== Semifinals ===
The semifinals were held at 18:19.

==== Semifinal 1 ====
Rank	Lane	Name	Nationality	Time	Notes
1	2	Fabio Scozzoli	Italy	27.37	Q
2	6	Hendrik Feldwehr	Germany	27.53	Q
3	5	Mark Gangloff	United States	27.57	Q
4	3	Glenn Snyders	New Zealand	27.64	
5	4	Matjaž Markič	Slovenia	27.71	
6	8	Vlad Polyakov	Kazakhstan	27.81	
7	7	Petr Bartůněk	Czech Republic	27.87	
8	1	Čaba Silađi	Serbia	27.89	

==== Semifinal 2 ====
Rank	Lane	Name	Nationality	Time	Notes
1	6	Cameron van der Burgh	South Africa	26.90	Q
2	4	Felipe França Silva	Brazil	26.95	Q
3	3	Alexander Dale Oen	Norway	27.33	Q, NR
4	5	Damir Dugonjič	Slovenia	27.51	Q
4	8	Lennart Stekelenburg	Netherlands	27.51	Q
6	2	Dragos Agache	Romania	27.71	
7	7	Aleksandr Triznov	Russia	27.73	
8	1	Brenton Rickard	Australia	27.80	

=== Final ===
The final was held at 19:37. Video replay shows Felipe França Silva using an illegal dolphin kick at the finish; however the official on deck did not see it and so the results stand.

Rank	Lane	Name	Nationality	Time	Notes
1st place, gold medalist(s)	5	Felipe França Silva	Brazil	27.01	
2nd place, silver medalist(s)	6	Fabio Scozzoli	Italy	27.17	NR
3rd place, bronze medalist(s)	4	Cameron van der Burgh	South Africa	27.19	
4	1	Hendrik Feldwehr	Germany	27.41	
5	3	Alexander Dale Oen	Norway	27.43	
6	8	Mark Gangloff	United States	27.58	
7	7	Lennart Stekelenburg	Netherlands	27.65	
8	2	Damir Dugonjič	Slovenia	28.00	
