= Swimming at the 2009 World Aquatics Championships – Men's 50 metre backstroke =

Men's 50 metre backstroke at the 2009 FINA World Championships
- Venue: Foro Italico
- Dates: 1 August 2009 (heats, semifinals); 2 August 2009 (final)
- Competitors: 142
- Winning time: 24.04 seconds

Medalists
gold medal	Liam Tancock	Great Britain
silver medal	Junya Koga	Japan
bronze medal	Gerhard Zandberg	South Africa

The heats for the men's 50 metre backstroke race at the 2009 World Championships took place in the morning and evening of 1 August, with the final in the evening session of 2 August at the Foro Italico in Rome, Italy.

== Records ==
Prior to this competition, the existing world and competition records were as follows:

World record	Randall Bal (USA)	24.33	Eindhoven, Netherlands	5 December 2008
Championship record	Thomas Rupprath (GER)	24.80	Barcelona, Spain	27 July 2003

The following records were established during the competition:

Date	Round	Name	Nationality	Time	Record
1 August	Heat 13	Guilherme Guido	Brazil	24.49	CR
1 August	Semifinal 1	Liam Tancock	(United Kingdom) Great Britain	24.08	WR
2 August	Final	Liam Tancock	(United Kingdom) Great Britain	24.04	WR

== Results ==
=== Heats ===
Rank	Name	Nationality	Time	Heat	Lane	Notes
1	Guilherme Guido	Brazil	24.49	13	4	CR, SA
2	Aschwin Wildeboer	Spain	24.50	14	5	NR
3	Camille Lacourt	France	24.52	13	5	NR
4	Liam Tancock	Great Britain	24.55	15	8	
5	Junya Koga	Japan	24.57	15	4	
6	Helge Meeuw	Germany	24.60	14	4	NR
7	Gerhard Zandberg	South Africa	24.68	13	8	AF
8	Flori Lang	Switzerland	24.75	14	3	NR
9	Juan Miguel Rando	Spain	24.77	13	3	
10	Guy Barnea	Israel	24.79	14	9	
11	Aristeidis Grigoriadis	Greece	24.80	15	7	
12	Ryosuke Irie	Japan	24.87	15	6	
13	Thomas Rupprath	Germany	24.92	15	5	
14	Daniel Orzechowski	Brazil	24.97	14	8	
14	Ashley Delaney	Australia	24.97	15	3	
16	Mirco Di Tora	Italy	25.01	14	6	
17	Nick Driebergen	Netherlands	25.08	14	7	NR
18	Enrico Catalano	Italy	25.10	13	7	
19	Matt Grevers	USA	25.13	15	1	
20	Pascal Wollach	Canada	25.23	13	3	NR
21	Vytautas Janušaitis	Lithuania	25.24	11	5	NR
22	Aaron Peirsol	USA	25.30	14	1	
23	Daniel Bell	New Zealand	25.31	13	2	
24	Benjamin Stasiulis	France	25.32	13	6	
25	Răzvan Florea	Romania	25.34	14	2	
26	Arkady Vyatchanin	Russia	25.36	15	2	
27	Charl Van Zyl	South Africa	25.39	13	0	
28	Karl Burdis	Ireland	25.40	9	6	NR
29	Marco Loughran	Great Britain	25.44	12	6	
30	Pavel Sankovich	Belarus	25.53	12	3	
31	Stanislav Donets	Russia	25.54	12	4	
32	Sung Min	South Korea	25.57	15	0	
33	Markus Rogan	Austria	25.59	15	9	
34	Jake Tapp	Canada	25.68	12	9	
35	Jeong Doohee	South Korea	25.77	10	6	
36	Bruno Claeys	Belgium	25.84	13	9	NR
37	Nadav Kochavi	Israel	25.94	11	6	
38	Danil Bugakov	Uzbekistan	25.97	12	7	
39	Cheng Feiyi	China	26.01	12	2	
40	Derya Büyükuncu	Turkey	26.07	11	0	
41	Radosław Kawęcki	Poland	26.08	14	0	
42	Andres Olvik	Estonia	26.11	10	7	NR
43	Krzysztof Jankiewicz	Poland	26.19	12	5	
44	Donal O'Neill	Ireland	26.29	12	0	
45	Pedro Medel	Cuba	26.35	10	5	
46	Tomas Fucik	Czech Republic	26.40	9	2	
47	Robi Zbogar	Slovenia	26.41	10	4	
48	Zhang Yu	China	26.42	11	7	
49	Jean-François Schneiders	Luxembourg	26.54	12	8	
50	David Dunford	Kenya	26.62	8	6	
51	Kaspar Raigla	Estonia	26.63	9	8	
52	Erwin Dokter	Austria	26.68	11	3	
53	Kouam Amine	Morocco	26.69	11	8	NR
54	Ng Kai Wee Rainer	Singapore	26.70	10	8	NR
55	Mindaugas Sadauskas	Lithuania	26.71	7	7	
56	Konstantins Blohins	Latvia	26.72	8	2	
57	Andrejs Dūda	Latvia	26.84	8	1	
58	Oliver Elliot Banados	Chile	26.94	9	5	
59	Nicholas James	Zimbabwe	27.01	7	9	NR
60	Stanislav Osinsky	Kazakhstan	27.06	11	1	
61	David Rodriguez	Cuba	27.07	9	4	
62	Christian Homer	Trinidad and Tobago	27.10	9	9	
62	Miguel Robles	Mexico	27.10	10	1	NR
64	Artiom Gladun	Moldova	27.13	10	2	
65	Nicolas Francia Vina	Uruguay	27.29	11	4	
66	Glenn Victor Sutanto	Indonesia	27.32	11	9	
67	Cheah Geoffrey Robin	Hong Kong	27.36	8	4	
68	Do Huy Long	Vietnam	27.39	8	5	
68	Grant Beahan	Zimbabwe	27.39	8	0	
70	Doğa Çelik	Turkey	27.51	10	9	
71	Jean Luis Gomez	Dominican Republic	27.58	7	3	NR
72	Kári J. á Høvdanum	Faroe Islands	27.65	8	9	NR
73	Rony Bakale	Republic of the Congo	27.70	8	8	
74	Radomyos Matjiur	Thailand	27.73	10	0	
75	Heshan Bandara Unamboowe	Sri Lanka	27.83	7	1	
75	Fernando Castellanos	Guatemala	27.83	7	8	
77	Yury Zaharov	Kyrgyzstan	27.94	10	3	
78	Zane Jordan	Zambia	27.95	6	2	
79	Mohammed Al Ghaferi	United Arab Emirates	28.05	6	3	
80	Antonio Tong	Macau	28.15	8	7	
81	Boris Kirillov	Azerbaijan	28.36	6	4	
82	Byron Briedenhann	Namibia	28.38	6	9	
83	Brett Fraser	Cayman Islands	28.47	6	6	
84	Joao Matias	Angola	28.48	7	0	
85	Samson Opuakpo	Nigeria	28.57	5	6	
85	Khachik Plavchyan	Armenia	28.57	7	6	
87	Tsung Chao-Lin	Chinese Taipei	28.62	9	0	
88	Abbas Raad	Lebanon	28.70	6	0	
89	Mario Montoya	Costa Rica	28.85	6	5	
90	Erik Rajohnson	Madagascar	28.90	9	3	
91	Marcelino Richaards	Suriname	29.16	6	1	
92	Ronny Vencatachellum	Mauritius	29.18	5	5	
93	Tural Abbasov	Azerbaijan	29.28	7	4	
94	Faiz Muhammad	Pakistan	29.33	5	8	NR
95	Nicholas Coard	Grenada	29.60	5	1	
96	Matar Samb	Senegal	29.61	5	4	
97	Jean-Luc Augier	Saint Lucia	29.66	4	1	
98	Kerson Hadley	Federated States of Micronesia	29.71	3	4	
99	Kailan Staal	Northern Mariana Islands	29.75	4	6	
100	Andrey Molchanov	Turkmenistan	29.76	3	2	
101	Mark Sammut	Malta	29.82	5	9	
102	Heimanu Sichan	French Polynesia	29.99	5	7	
102	Ngou Pok Man	Macau	29.99	12	1	
104	Rainui Teriipaia	French Polynesia	30.15	5	2	
105	Milimo Mweetwa	Zambia	30.18	4	5	
106	Ivo Chilaule	Mozambique	30.35	2	4	
107	Batsaikhan Dulguun	Mongolia	30.41	6	8	
108	Peter Popahun Pokawin	Papua New Guinea	30.56	4	7	
109	Carlos Alberto	Angola	30.64	4	4	
110	Pepelate Gbagi	Nigeria	30.83	4	9	
111	Douglas Miller	Fiji	30.95	3	1	
112	Mathieu Marquet	Mauritius	31.18	4	3	
113	Gary Pineda	Guatemala	31.46	3	3	
114	Juan Carlos Sikaffy Diaz	Honduras	31.47	4	2	
115	Henk Aloysius Lowe	Guyana	31.53	1	2	
116	Daniel Kevin Pryke	Papua New Guinea	31.55	3	8	
117	Timur Atahanov	Turkmenistan	31.58	3	7	
118	Patricio Vera	Mozambique	31.66	7	2	
119	Siu Kent Chung	Brunei	31.74	3	5	
120	Mario Sulkja	Albania	31.88	5	0	
121	Saif Alaslam Saeed Al-Saadi	Iraq	32.22	2	0	
122	Jake Villarreal	Marshall Islands	32.26	2	6	
123	Elaijie Erasito	Fiji	32.82	3	0	
124	Quenton Dupont	Eswatini	33.07	2	3	
125	Mohamed Mujahid	Maldives	34.06	2	7	
126	Shameel Ibrahim	Maldives	34.66	2	2	
127	Omar Abdalla	Tanzania	37.84	2	9	
128	Nsumizi Alain Boris	Burundi	39.17	3	6	
129	Said Seba	Tanzania	43.64	1	4	
130	Isidore Lokossou Krobli	Benin	46.10	1	1	
–	Alejandro Jacobo	Mexico	DNS	1	3	
–	Mohamed Bangura	Sierra Leone	DNS	1	5	
–	Abdoulkader Houssein	Djibouti	DNS	2	1	
–	Habonimana Yves	Burundi	DNS	2	5	
–	Houmed Hassan Ali	Djibouti	DNS	2	8	
–	Branden Whitehurst	United States Virgin Islands	DNS	3	9	
–	Hocine Haciane	Andorra	DNS	4	8	
–	Achelhi Bilal	Morocco	DNS	5	3	
–	Nicholas Thomson	Bermuda	DNS	6	7	
–	Charles William Walker	Philippines	DNS	8	3	
–	Omar Pinzón	Colombia	DNS	9	7	
–	Albert Subirats	Venezuela	DNS	11	2	

=== Semifinals ===
Rank	Name	Nationality	Time	Heat	Lane	Notes
1	Liam Tancock	Great Britain	24.08	1	5	WR
2	Junya Koga	Japan	24.29	2	3	AS
3	Camille Lacourt	France	24.46	2	5	NR
4	Aschwin Wildeboer	Spain	24.48	1	4	NR
5	Helge Meeuw	Germany	24.59	1	3	NR
6	Gerhard Zandberg	South Africa	24.68	2	6	=AF
7	Mirco Di Tora	Italy	24.77	1	8	NR
7	Aristeidis Grigoriadis	Greece	24.77	2	7	NR
9	Flori Lang	Switzerland	24.78	1	6	
10	Ryosuke Irie	Japan	24.79	1	7	
11	Juan Miguel Rando	Spain	24.80	2	2	
12	Guy Barnea	Israel	24.81	1	2	
13	Thomas Rupprath	Germany	24.87	2	1	
14	Daniel Orzechowski	Brazil	24.92	1	1	
15	Guilherme Guido	Brazil	24.98	2	4	
16	Ashley Delaney	Australia	25.02	2	8	

=== Final ===
Rank	Name	Nationality	Time	Lane	Notes
1st place, gold medalist(s)	Liam Tancock	Great Britain	24.04	4	WR
2nd place, silver medalist(s)	Junya Koga	Japan	24.24	5	AS
3rd place, bronze medalist(s)	Gerhard Zandberg	South Africa	24.34	7	AF
4	Aschwin Wildeboer	Spain	24.57	6	
5	Camille Lacourt	France	24.61	3	
6	Helge Meeuw	Germany	24.63	2	
7	Aristeidis Grigoriadis	Greece	24.87	8	
8	Mirco Di Tora	Italy	25.15	1	
