= Swimming at the 2009 World Aquatics Championships – Men's 100 metre backstroke =

Men's 100 metre backstroke at the 2009 FINA World Championships
- Venue: Foro Italico
- Dates: 27 July 2009 (heats, semifinals); 28 July 2009 (final)
- Competitors: 121
- Winning time: 52.26 seconds

Medalists
gold medal	Junya Koga	Japan
silver medal	Helge Meeuw	Germany
bronze medal	Aschwin Wildeboer	Spain

The men's 100 metre backstroke at the 2009 World Championships took place Monday 27 July (prelims and semifinals) and on the evening of Tuesday 28 July (final) at the Foro Italico in Rome, Italy.

== Records ==
Prior to this competition, the existing world and competition records were as follows:

World record	Aaron Peirsol (USA)	51.94	Indianapolis, United States	8 July 2009
Championship record	Aaron Peirsol (USA)	52.98	Melbourne, Australia	27 March 2007

The following records were established during the competition:

Date	Round	Name	Nationality	Time	Record
27 July	Heat 12	Aschwin Wildeboer	Spain	52.93	CR
27 July	Semifinal 1	Junya Koga	Japan	52.39	CR
28 July	Final	Junya Koga	Japan	52.26	CR

== Results ==
=== Heats ===
Rank	Name	Nationality	Time	Heat	Lane	Notes
1	Aschwin Wildeboer	Spain	52.93	12	4	CR
2	Ryosuke Irie	Japan	53.00	11	4	
3	Liam Tancock	Great Britain	53.08	11	3	NR
3	Junya Koga	Japan	53.08	13	5	
3	Aaron Peirsol	United States	53.08	13	4	
6	Helge Meeuw	Germany	53.28	13	3	
7	Ashley Delaney	Australia	53.33	12	6	
8	Markus Rogan	Austria	53.62	11	2	
9	Jérémy Stravius	France	53.67	12	3	
10	Arkady Vyatchanin	Russia	53.73	11	5	
11	Mirco di Tora	Italy	53.77	12	7	NR
12	Juan Miguel Rando	Spain	53.89	10	0	
12	Stanislav Donets	Russia	53.89	11	6	
14	Nicolaas Driebergen	Netherlands	53.94	10	5	NR
14	Aristeidis Grigoriadis	Greece	53.94	13	2	
16	Matt Grevers	United States	54.04	12	5	
17	Pascal Wollach	Canada	54.08	12	2	
18	Guilherme Guido	Brazil	54.17	13	7	
19	Benjamin Stasiulis	Lithuania	54.18	13	6	
20	George Du Rand	South Africa	54.29	11	8	
21	Răzvan Florea	Romania	54.47	13	1	
22	Guy Barnea	Israel	54.51	13	8	
23	Daniel Bell	New Zealand	54.58	13	0	
24	Marco Loughran	Great Britain	54.61	11	1	
25	Leonardo Guedes	Brazil	54.64	12	1	
26	Radosław Kawęcki	Poland	54.66	11	0	NR
27	Charl Van Zyl	South Africa	54.67	10	6	
28	Karl Burdis	Ireland	54.74	10	9	NR
29	Damiano Lestingi	Italy	54.77	11	7	
30	Omar Pinzón	Colombia	54.97	11	9	NR
31	Jake Tapp	Canada	54.99	12	0	
32	Robert Hurley	Australia	55.18	12	8	
33	He Jianbin	China	55.24	10	7	
34	Sung Min	South Korea	55.39	12	9	
35	Cheng Feiyi	China	55.52	13	9	
36	Sebastian Stoss	Austria	55.57	9	6	
37	Derya Büyükuncu	Turkey	55.78	10	4	
38	Flori Lang	Switzerland	55.84	10	3	
39	Tomas Fucik	Czech Republic	56.10	8	7	
39	Andriy Kovbasa	Ukraine	56.10	10	1	
41	Itai Chammah	Israel	56.15	1	5	
41	Donal O'Neill	Ireland	56.15	10	8	
43	Krzysztof Jankiewicz	Poland	56.23	10	2	
44	Bruno Claeys	Belgium	56.34	9	4	
45	Andres Olvik	Estonia	56.37	8	2	NR
46	Dimitrios Chasiotis	Greece	56.58	9	1	
47	Pedro Oliveira	Portugal	56.69	9	8	
48	Danil Bugakov	Uzbekistan	56.77	9	3	
49	Alexandru Felix Maestru	Romania	56.80	8	1	
50	Martin Liivamägi	Estonia	57.00	8	8	
51	Stanislav Osinsky	Kazakhstan	57.02	8	5	
52	Pedro Medel	Cuba	57.03	9	2	
53	Miguel Robles	Mexico	57.14	9	7	
54	Robi Zbogar	Slovenia	57.45	8	3	
55	Jean-François Schneiders	Luxembourg	57.49	8	4	
56	Konstantins Bohins	Latvia	57.68	7	6	
57	Naoufel Benabid	Algeria	57.81	7	5	NR
58	Kouam Amine	Morocco	57.95	7	8	NR
59	Andrejs Dūda	Latvia	58.00	7	2	
60	Raphaël Stacchiotti	Luxembourg	58.03	9	0	
61	Glenn Victor Sutanto	Indonesia	58.29	7	7	
62	Ng Kai Wee Raine	Singapore	58.57	7	4	
63	Cheah Geoffrey Robin	Hong Kong	58.69	7	3	
64	David Rodriguez	Cuba	58.70	7	1	
65	Do Huy Long	Vietnam	58.79	7	0	
66	Tsung Chao-Lin	Chinese Taipei	58.93	8	9	
67	Nicolas Francia Viña	Uruguay	58.94	9	5	
68	Artiom Gladun	Moldova	58.97	9	9	
69	Rony Bakale	Republic of the Congo	59.10	6	6	
70	Yury Zaharov	Kyrgyzstan	59.13	8	6	
71	Serghei Golban	Moldova	59.16	6	3	
72	Heshan Bandara Unamboowe	Sri Lanka	59.47	4	9	
73	Achelhi Bilal	Morocco	59.49	5	1	
74	Jean Luis Gomez	Dominican Republic	1:00.16	6	7	
75	Doğa Çelik	Turkey	1:00.22	8	0	
76	Khachik Plavchyan	Armenia	1:00.31	6	5	
77	Nicholas James	Zimbabwe	1:00.34	5	5	
78	Boris Kirillov	Azerbaijan	1:00.44	5	8	
79	Radomyos Matjiur	Thailand	1:00.61	6	4	
80	Byron Briedenhann	Namibia	1:00.85	5	9	
81	Ashwin Menon	India	1:00.90	5	3	
82	Mohammed Al Ghaferi	United Arab Emirates	1:01.18	5	6	
83	Antonio Tong	Macau	1:01.41	5	4	
84	Marcelino Richaards	Suriname	1:01.65	4	5	
85	Ryan Nelthropp	United States Virgin Islands	1:01.69	4	2	
86	Kari Joannesarson Hoevdanum	Faroe Islands	1:01.70	6	1	
87	Fernando Castellanos	Guatemala	1:01.92	3	4	
88	Alberto Tasini	San Marino	1:02.18	5	0	
89	Yousuf Essa Al Yousuf	Saudi Arabia	1:02.28	6	2	
90	Armando Zayas Claure	Bolivia	1:02.87	3	5	
91	Abbas Raad	Lebanon	1:03.28	6	9	
92	Ngou Pok Man	Macau	1:03.69	4	7	
93	Praveen Tokas	India	1:03.74	6	8	
94	Samson Opuakpo	Nigeria	1:03.81	3	1	
95	Benjamin Gabbard	American Samoa	1:03.86	3	9	
96	Javier Hernandez Maradiaga	Honduras	1:03.98	6	0	
97	Nicholas Coard	Grenada	1:04.02	4	1	
98	Ronny Vencatachellum	Mauritius	1:04.11	4	8	
99	Tural Abbasov	Azerbaijan	1:04.47	5	7	
100	Matar Samb	Senegal	1:04.71	5	2	
101	Mark Sammut	Malta	1:05.08	4	3	
102	Edward Caruana Dingli	Malta	1:05.43	3	7	
103	Vincent Perry	French Polynesia	1:05.72	4	6	
104	Juan Carlos Sikaffy Diaz	Honduras	1:06.01	3	8	
105	Batsaikhan Dulguun	Mongolia	1:06.96	4	0	
106	Mathieu Marquet	Mauritius	1:07.26	2	4	
107	Sidni Hoxha	Albania	1:08.15	4	4	
108	Saif Alaslam Saeed Alsaadi	Iraq	1:08.21	1	4	
109	Paul Elaisa	Fiji	1:08.81	2	8	
110	Siu Kent Chung	Brunei	1:08.98	3	2	
111	Carlos Alberto	Angola	1:09.14	2	3	
112	Timur Atahanov	Turkmenistan	1:09.42	2	2	
112	Gary Pineda	Guatemala	1:09.42	3	0	
114	Pepelate Gbagi	Nigeria	1:10.45	2	6	
115	Elaijie Erasito	Fiji	1:11.00	2	7	
116	Nadir Elmofti	Libya	1:16.32	2	1	
117	Shameel Ibrahim	Maldives	1:19.06	2	0	
—	Mario Sulkja	Albania	DNS	2	5	
—	Hocine Haciane	Andorra	DNS	3	6	
—	Brett Fraser	Cayman Islands	DNS	7	9	
—	Faiz Muhammad	Pakistan	DSQ	3	3	

=== Semifinals ===
Rank	Heat	Lane	Name	Nationality	Time	Notes
1	1	5	Junya Koga	Japan	52.39	CR, AS
2	1	3	Helge Meeuw	Germany	52.49	NR
3	1	4	Ryosuke Irie	Japan	52.73	
4	2	4	Aschwin Wildeboer	Spain	52.76	
5	1	8	Matt Grevers	United States	52.82	
6	2	8	Aristeidis Grigoriadis	Greece	53.03	NR
7	1	2	Arkady Vyatchanin	Russia	53.11	
8	2	5	Liam Tancock	Great Britain	53.12	
9	2	3	Aaron Peirsol	United States	53.22	
10	2	6	Ashley Delaney	Australia	53.24	
11	1	6	Markus Rogan	Austria	53.40	
12	2	2	Jérémy Stravius	France	53.82	
13	2	7	Mirco di Tora	Italy	53.88	
14	1	1	Nicolaas Driebergen	Netherlands	53.92	NR
15	1	7	Juan Miguel Rando	Spain	54.13	
16	2	1	Stanislav Donets	Russia	54.24	

=== Final ===
Rank	Lane	Name	Nationality	Time	Notes
1st place, gold medalist(s)	4	Junya Koga	Japan	52.26	CR, AS
2nd place, silver medalist(s)	5	Helge Meeuw	Germany	52.54	
3rd place, bronze medalist(s)	6	Aschwin Wildeboer	Spain	52.64	
4	3	Ryosuke Irie	Japan	52.73	
4	8	Liam Tancock	Great Britain	52.73	NR
6	1	Arkady Vyatchanin	Russia	52.87	NR
7	2	Matt Grevers	United States	53.14	
8	7	Aristeidis Grigoriadis	Greece	53.43	

== See also ==
- Swimming at the 2007 World Aquatics Championships – Men's 100 metre backstroke
- Swimming at the 2008 Summer Olympics – Men's 100 metre backstroke
