= List of Guinean records in swimming =

The Guinean records in swimming are the fastest ever performances of swimmers from Guinea, which are recognised and ratified by the Fédération Guinéenne de Natation et Sauvetage.

All records were set in finals unless noted otherwise.

== Long Course (50 m) ==
=== Men ===
Event	Time		Name	Club	Date	Meet	Location	Ref
50 m freestyle	26.13	h	Elhadj N'Gnane Diallo	Guinea	1 August 2025	World Championships	Singapore, Singapore	
100 m freestyle	58.39	h	Elhadj N'Gnane Diallo	Guinea	30 July 2025	World Championships	Singapore, Singapore	
200 m freestyle	2:45.39	h	Oumar Kaba	Guinea	6 September 2015	All-Africa Games	Brazzaville, Congo	
400 m freestyle								
800 m freestyle								
1500 m freestyle								
50 m backstroke								
100 m backstroke								
200 m backstroke								
50 m breaststroke	32.12	h, †	Mamadou Cisse	Guinea	26 July 2009	World Championships	Rome, Italy	
100 m breaststroke	1:11.59	h	Mamadou Cisse	Guinea	26 July 2009	World Championships	Rome, Italy	
200 m breaststroke								
50 m butterfly	28.17	h	Fode Amara Camara	Guinea	27 July 2025	World Championships	Singapore, Singapore	
100 m butterfly								
200 m butterfly								
200 m individual medley	2:49.33	h	Mamadou Bah	Guinea	7 March 2020	7th Africa CANA Zone II Championships	Accra, Ghana	
400 m individual medley	6:42.14	h	Mamadou Bah	Guinea	7 March 2020	7th Africa CANA Zone II Championships	Accra, Ghana	
4×100 m freestyle relay								
4×200 m freestyle relay								
4×100 m medley relay								

Legend: # – Record awaiting ratification by Fédération Guinéenne de Natation et Sauvetage; WR – World record; AF – African record;
Records not set in finals: h – heat; sf – semifinal; r – relay 1st leg; rh – relay heat 1st leg; b – B final; † – en route to final mark; so – swim-off; tt – time trial

=== Women ===
Event	Time		Name	Club	Date	Meet	Location	Ref
50 m freestyle	31.90	h	Djenabou Bah	Guinea	3 August 2024	Olympic Games	Paris, France	
100 m freestyle								
200 m freestyle								
400 m freestyle								
800 m freestyle								
1500 m freestyle	22:06.93		Djenabou Bah	Guinea	6 December 2023	African Junior Championships	Mauritius, Mauritius	
50 m backstroke								
100 m backstroke								
200 m backstroke								
50 m breaststroke	41.10	h	Mariama Touré	Guinea	12 March 2024	African Games	Accra, Ghana	
100 m breaststroke	1:35.41	h	Mariama Touré	Guinea	24 July 2023	World Championships	Fukuoka, Japan	
200 m breaststroke								
50 m butterfly								
100 m butterfly								
200 m butterfly								
200 m individual medley								
400 m individual medley								
4×100 m freestyle relay								
4×200 m freestyle relay								
4×100 m medley relay								

Legend: # – Record awaiting ratification by Fédération Guinéenne de Natation et Sauvetage; WR – World record; AF – African record;
Records not set in finals: h – heat; sf – semifinal; r – relay 1st leg; rh – relay heat 1st leg; b – B final; † – en route to final mark; so – swim-off; tt – time trial

== Short Course (25 m) ==
=== Men ===
Event	Time		Name	Club	Date	Meet	Location	Ref
50 m freestyle	26.48	h	Mamadou Bah	Guinea	18 December 2021	World Championships	Abu Dhabi, United Arab Emirates	
100 m freestyle	1:00.55	h	Mamadou Bah	Guinea	20 December 2021	World Championships	Abu Dhabi, United Arab Emirates	
200 m freestyle								
400 m freestyle								
800 m freestyle								
1500 m freestyle								
50 m backstroke								
100 m backstroke								
200 m backstroke								
50 m breaststroke	33.12	h	Yaya Yeressa	Guinea	15 December 2018	World Championships	Hangzhou, China	
100 m breaststroke	1:15.15	h	Yaya Yeressa	Guinea	11 December 2018	World Championships	Hangzhou, China	
200 m breaststroke								
50 m butterfly								
100 m butterfly								
200 m butterfly								
100 m individual medley								
200 m individual medley								
400 m individual medley								
4×50 m freestyle relay								
4×100 m freestyle relay								
4×200 m freestyle relay								
4×50 m medley relay								
4×100 m medley relay								

Legend: # – Record awaiting ratification by Fédération Guinéenne de Natation et Sauvetage; WR – World record; AF – African record;
Records not set in finals: h – heat; sf – semifinal; r – relay 1st leg; rh – relay heat 1st leg; b – B final; † – en route to final mark; so – swim-off; tt – time trial

=== Women ===
Event	Time		Name	Club	Date	Meet	Location	Ref
50 m freestyle	37.20	h	Mariama Touré	Guinea	20 December 2021	World Championships	Abu Dhabi, United Arab Emirates	
100 m freestyle								
200 m freestyle								
400 m freestyle								
800 m freestyle								
1500 m freestyle								
50m backstroke								
100m backstroke								
200m backstroke								
50 m breaststroke	44.67	h	Mariama Touré	Guinea	11 December 2018	World Championships	Hangzhou, China	
100 m breaststroke								
200 m breaststroke								
50 m butterfly								
100 m butterfly								
200 m butterfly								
100 m individual medley								
200 m individual medley								
400 m individual medley								
4×50 m freestyle relay								
4×100 m freestyle relay								
4×200 m freestyle relay								
4×50 m medley relay								
4×100 m medley relay								

Legend: # – Record awaiting ratification by Fédération Guinéenne de Natation et Sauvetage; WR – World record; AF – African record;
Records not set in finals: h – heat; sf – semifinal; r – relay 1st leg; rh – relay heat 1st leg; b – B final; † – en route to final mark; so – swim-off; tt – time trial
