= Swimming at the 2009 World Aquatics Championships – Men's 4 × 100 metre freestyle relay =

Men's 4 × 100 metre freestyle relay at the 2009 FINA World Championships
- Venue: Foro Italico
- Date: 26 July 2009
- Teams: 41
- Winning time: 3:09.21

Medalists
gold medal	United States; Michael Phelps, Ryan Lochte, Matt Grevers, Nathan Adrian, Garrett Weber-Gale*, Ricky Berens*, Cullen Jones*
silver medal	Russia; Yevgeny Lagunov, Andrey Grechin, Danila Izotov, Alexander Sukhorukov, Nikita Konovalov*
bronze medal	France; Fabien Gilot, Alain Bernard, Grégory Mallet, Frédérick Bousquet, Amaury Leveaux*, William Meynard* * Swimmers who participated in the heats only

The men's 4×100 m freestyle relay at the 2009 World Aquatics Championships took place on 26 July 2009 at the Foro Italico in Rome, Italy.

== Records ==
Prior to this competition, the existing world and competition records were as follows:

World Record	United States; Michael Phelps (47.51); Garrett Weber-Gale (47.02); Cullen Jones (47.65); Jason Lezak (46.06)	3:08.24	Beijing, China	11 August 2008
Championship Record	United States; Michael Phelps (48.42); Neil Walker (48.31); Cullen Jones (48.67); Jason Lezak (47.32)	3:12.72	Melbourne, Australia	25 March 2007

The following records were established during the competition:

Date	Round	Nation	Time	Record
26 July	Heat 3	Australia; Matthew Abood (48.35); Andrew Lauterstein (48.42); Tommaso D'Orsogna (47.82); Matt Targett (48.07)	3:12.58	CR
26 July	Heat 4	France; Amaury Leveaux (48.37); Grégory Mallet (47.78); William Meynard (48.11); Fabien Gilot (47.12)	3:11.38	CR
26 July	Heat 5	Brazil; César Cielo Filho (47.39) CR; Nicolas Oliveira (47.51); Guilherme Roth (48.15); Fernando Silva (48.21)	3:11.26	CR
26 July	Final	United States; Michael Phelps (47.78); Ryan Lochte (47.03); Matt Grevers (47.61); Nathan Adrian (46.79)	3:09.21	CR

== Results ==
=== Heats ===
Rank	Heat	Lane	Nation	Swimmers	Time	Notes
1	5	6	Brazil	César Cielo Filho (47.39) CR, AM; Nicolas Oliveira (47.51); Guilherme Roth (48.15); Fernando Silva (48.21)	3:11.26	CR, SA
2	4	4	France	Amaury Leveaux (48.37); Grégory Mallet (47.78); William Meynard (48.11); Fabien Gilot (47.12)	3:11.38	
3	4	3	Great Britain	Adam Brown (49.01); Simon Burnett (47.57); Liam Tancock (47.74); Ross Davenport (47.30)	3:11.62	NR
4	5	4	United States	Garrett Weber-Gale (48.30); Matt Grevers (47.55); Ricky Berens (48.19); Cullen Jones (47.60)	3:11.64	
5	5	5	Italy	Francesco Donin (48.79); Alessandro Calvi (47.88); Marco Orsi (47.89); Christian Galenda (47.20)	3:11.76	
6	5	3	South Africa	Lyndon Ferns (47.94) AF; Darian Townsend (48.02); Roland Schoeman (48.54); Graeme Moore (47.58)	3:12.08	AF
7	3	4	Australia	Matthew Abood (48.35); Andrew Lauterstein (48.32); Tommaso D'Orsogna (47.84); Matt Targett (48.07)	3:12.58	
8	3	3	Russia	Yevgeny Lagunov (48.48); Danila Izotov (48.21); Nikita Konovalov (48.46); Alexander Sukhorukov (47.63)	3:12.78	NR
9	3	5	Canada	Brent Hayden (47.77); Joel Greenshields (48.36); Colin Russell (48.11); Stefan Hirniak (48.72)	3:12.96	
10	4	5	Sweden	Stefan Nystrand (47.52) NR; Lars Frölander (48.12); Simon Sjödin (48.62); Petter Stymne (49.12)	3:13.38	
11	4	2	Japan	Takuro Fujii (48.87); Rammaru Harada (49.37); Yoshihiro Okumura (47.93); Makoto Ito (49.46)	3:15.63	AS
12	5	2	Switzerland	Dominik Meichtry (49.02); Flori Lang (48.15); Gregory Widmer (48.63); Aurelien Kunzi (50.33)	3:16.13	NR
13	4	6	Poland	Konrad Czerniak (48.61); Marcin Tarczyński (48.95); Łukasz Gąsior (48.80); Mateusz Stawinski (49.99)	3:16.35	
14	4	8	Lithuania	Vytautas Janušaitis (49.50); Paulius Viktoravičius (48.01); Mindaugas Sadauskas (48.90); Mindaugas Margis (50.06)	3:16.47	NR
15	3	6	China	Chen Zuo (49.70); Lü Zhiwu (49.04); Shi Tengfei (49.27); Cai Li (49.07)	3:17.08	
16	3	2	Venezuela	Crox Acuña (49.95); Octavio Alesi (49.69); Roberto Gómez (48.84); Albert Subirats (49.31)	3:17.79	NR
17	2	1	Belgium	Pholien Systermans (50.19); Yoris Grandjean (49.12); Pierre Yves Romanini (49.43); Glenn Surgeloose (49.23)	3:17.97	NR
18	1	4	Czech Republic	Michal Rubáček (49.46); Martin Verner (48.87); Jan Šefl (50.11); Květoslav Svoboda (50.23)	3:18.67	NR
19	3	0	Ireland	Barry Murphy (49.98) NR; Ryan Harrison (50.87); Conor Leaney (49.51); Karl Burdis (51.41)	3:21.77	NR
20	5	7	Kazakhstan	Stanislav Kuzmin (50.69); Alexandr Sklyar (50.13); Oleg Rabota (51.34); Artur Dilman (50.79)	3:22.95	
21	4	1	Uzbekistan	Daniil Tulupov (50.89); Danil Bugakov (50.10); Dmitriy Shvetsov (51.36); Petr Romashkin (51.20)	3:23.55	
22	5	0	Iran	Emin Noshadi (52.23); Pasha Vahdati Rad (51.37); Saeid Malekae Ashtiani (51.69); Mohammad Bidaryan (51.09)	3:26.38	
23	3	7	Barbados	Shawn Clarke (50.40) NR; Martyn Forde (51.85); Terrence Haynes (50.67); Vaughn Forsythe (54.23)	3:27.15	NR
24	5	1	Philippines	Miguel Molina (51.84); Kendrick Uy (53.29); Charles William Walker (51.35); Daniel Coakley (51.53)	3:28.01	
25	5	8	Singapore	Lim Clement (52.35); Lim Wen Hao Joshua (51.16); Tan Xue Wei Nicholas (52.21); Su Shirong Jeffrey (52.40)	3:28.12	
26	3	8	India	Arjun Jayaprakash (55.25); Rehan Poncha (55.71); Virdhawal Khade (50.78); Ashwin Menon (53.50)	3:35.24	
27	3	1	Kuwait	Mohammed Madouh (52.58); Humoud Alhumoud (54.62); Abdulrahman Albader (54.12); Marzouq Alsalem (54.29)	3:35.61	
28	4	0	United Arab Emirates	Obaid Al Jesmi (53.54); Mubarak Al-Besher (56.03); Saeed Al Jesmi (54.84); Mohammed Al Ghaferi (53.54)	3:37.95	
29	4	9	Senegal	Papa Madiop Ndong (55.79); Matar Samb (54.82); Abdoul Khadre Mbaye Niane (54.84); Malick Fall (52.87)	3:38.32	
30	2	7	Nigeria	Samson Opuakpo (54.06); Eric Williams (56.55); Pepelate Gbagi (55.73); Yellow Yeiyah (55.05)	3:41.39	
31	2	4	Armenia	Sergey Pevnev (58.67); Andranik Harutyunyan (53.50); Khachik Plavchyan (58.48); Mikayel Koloyan (51.17)	3:41.82	
32	2	3	Albania	Endi Babi (54.87); Mario Sulkja (58.16); Eduart Cane (56.48); Sidni Hoxha (52.62)	3:42.13	
33	1	5	Malta	Neil Agius (55.41); Edward Caruana Dingli (54.90); Andrea Agius (56.05); Mark Sammut (56.33)	3:42.69	
34	3	9	Macau	Lao Kuan Fong (54.26); Antonio Tong (55.86); Wong Wing Cheung Victor (54.93); Chong Cheok Kuan (58.24)	3:43.29	
35	2	5	Mauritius	Ronny Vencatachellum (56.24); Mathieu Marquet (57.41); Jean Hugues Gregoire (54.96); Jean Marie Froget (56.47)	3:45.08	
36	1	3	Mozambique	Leonel Matonse (55.50); Ivo Chilaule (55.62); Gerusio Matonse (58.30); Patricio Vera (56.00)	3:45.42	
37	2	6	Papua New Guinea	Ryan Pini (50.13); Daniel Kevin Pryke (56.59); Ian Bond Wolongkatop Nakmai (1:02.57); Peter Popahun Pokawin (56.48)	3:45.77	
38	2	2	Northern Mariana Islands	Eli Ebenezer Wong (56.03); Cooper Graf (1:01.94); Shin Kimura (1:03.72); Kailan Staal (56.14)	3:57.83	
-	2	8	Croatia		DNS	
-	5	9	Saudi Arabia		DNS	
-	4	7	Colombia		DQ	

=== Final ===
Rank	Lane	Nation	Swimmers	Time	Note
1st place, gold medalist(s)	6	United States	Michael Phelps (47.78); Ryan Lochte (47.03); Matt Grevers (47.61); Nathan Adrian (46.79)	3:09.21	CR
2nd place, silver medalist(s)	8	Russia	Yevgeny Lagunov (47.90); Andrey Grechin (47.00); Danila Izotov (47.23); Alexander Sukhorukov (47.39)	3:09.52	NR
3rd place, bronze medalist(s)	5	France	Fabien Gilot (47.73); Alain Bernard (46.46); Grégory Mallet (48.28); Frédérick Bousquet (47.42)	3:09.89	
4	4	Brazil	César Cielo Filho (47.09) CR, AM; Nicolas Oliveira (47.39); Guilherme Roth (48.15); Fernando Silva (48.17)	3:10.80	SA
5	2	Italy	Alessandro Calvi (49.03); Christian Galenda (47.60); Marco Orsi (47.91); Filippo Magnini (47.39)	3:11.93	
5	7	South Africa	Lyndon Ferns (48.32); Graeme Moore (48.05); Darian Townsend (48.05); Roland Schoeman (47.51)	3:11.93	AF
7	3	Great Britain	Adam Brown (48.66); Simon Burnett (47.50); Liam Tancock (47.81); Ross Davenport (48.12)	3:12.09	
8	1	Australia	Matthew Abood (48.79); Matt Targett (47.49); Andrew Lauterstein (48.41); Tommaso D'Orsogna (47.71)	3:12.40	
