= Swimming at the 2009 World Aquatics Championships – Men's 400 metre freestyle =

Men's 400 metre freestyle at the 2009 FINA World Championships
- Venue: Foro Italico
- Dates: 26 July 2009
- Competitors: 94
- Winning time: 3:40.07 WR

Medalists
gold medal	Paul Biedermann	Germany
silver medal	Oussama Mellouli	Tunisia
bronze medal	Zhang Lin	China

The heats for the men's 400 metre freestyle race at the 2009 World Championships took place on Sunday, 26 July at the Foro Italico in Rome, Italy.

== Records ==
World record	Ian Thorpe (AUS)	3:40.08	Manchester, United Kingdom	30 July 2002
Championship record	Ian Thorpe (AUS)	3:40.17	Fukuoka, Japan	22 July 2001

The following records were established during the competition:

Date	Round	Name	Nationality	Time	Record
26 July	Final	Paul Biedermann	Germany	3:40.07	WR

== Results ==
=== Heats ===
Rank	Name	Nationality	Time	Heat	Lane	Notes
1	Paul Biedermann	Germany	3:43.01	9	2	ER
2	Zhang Lin	China	3:43.58	9	4	
3	Oussama Mellouli	Tunisia	3:43.78	8	4	
4	Mads Glæsner	Denmark	3:44.59	8	3	NR
5	Peter Vanderkaay	United States	3:45.40	10	5	
6	David Davies	Great Britain	3:45.43	9	3	
7	Ryan Cochrane	Canada	3:45.52	8	5	
8	Gergő Kis	Hungary	3:45.68	8	6	NR
9	Daniel Madwed	United States	3:45.95	9	7	
10	Nikita Lobintsev	Russia	3:45.97	9	5	
11	Robert Hurley	Australia	3:46.01	10	2	
12	Park Tae-Hwan	South Korea	3:46.04	10	4	
13	Jean Basson	South Africa	3:46.64	10	8	
14	Robert Renwick	Great Britain	3:46.75	9	0	
15	Takeshi Matsuda	Japan	3:46.95	10	3	
16	Massimiliano Rosolino	Italy	3:47.05	10	6	
17	Cesare Sciocchetti	Italy	3:47.40	8	7	
18	Sun Yang	China	3:47.51	10	0	
19	David Brandl	Austria	3:47.61	9	8	
20	Ahmed Mathlouthi	Tunisia	3:47.83	10	7	
21	Ryan Napoleon	Australia	3:47.98	10	1	
22	Pál Joensen	Faroe Islands	3:48.93	8	1	
23	Jon Rahauge Rud	Denmark	3:49.17	10	9	
24	Péter Bernek	Hungary	3:49.43	7	4	
25	Sho Uchida	Japan	3:50.16	8	2	
26	Moss Burmester	New Zealand	3:51.31	8	8	
27	Blake Worsley	Canada	3:51.86	6	5	
28	Gard Kvale	Norway	3:52.22	8	0	
29	Dominik Koll	Austria	3:52.57	9	1	
30	David Karasek	Switzerland	3:52.64	6	4	
31	Esteban Paz	Argentina	3:53.07	7	5	NR
32	Julio Galofre	Colombia	3:54.24	6	2	NR
33	Stef Verachten	Belgium	3:54.66	7	3	
34	Djordje Markovic	Serbia	3:54.87	8	9	
35	Fabio Pereira	Portugal	3:55.00	7	7	
36	Daniele Tirabassi	Venezuela	3:55.55	7	6	
37	Jorge Maia	Portugal	3:55.76	9	9	
38	Ryan Harrison	Ireland	3:55.88	7	1	NR
39	Jang Sangjin	South Korea	3:56.35	7	2	
40	Mohamed Farhoud	Egypt	3:57.01	7	0	
41	Raphaël Stacchiotti	Luxembourg	3:57.34	6	3	
42	Daniel Delgadillo	Mexico	3:58.66	7	8	
43	Jan Karel Petric	Slovenia	3:58.91	6	7	
44	Ricardo Monasterio	Venezuela	3:59.04	6	1	
45	Mateo de Angulo	Colombia	3:59.11	6	6	
46	Nicolas Rostoucher	France	3:59.15	9	6	
47	Kemal Arda Gürdal	Turkey	3:59.47	5	5	
48	Oleg Rabota	Kazakhstan	3:59.60	6	8	
49	Chien Jui-Ting	Chinese Taipei	3:59.78	5	4	
50	Sebastián Jahnsen Madico	Peru	4:01.47	5	6	
51	Dmitriy Gordiyenko	Kazakhstan	4:02.13	5	3	
52	Ivan Alejandro Enderica	Ecuador	4:02.86	6	0	
53	Saeid Maleka Ashtiani	Iran	4:03.69	4	1	NR
54	Sebastian Arispe Silva	Peru	4:03.72	5	2	
55	Lin Kuan-Ting	Chinese Taipei	4:04.61	5	8	
56	Sobitjon Amilov	Uzbekistan	4:04.92	4	4	
56	Pan Kai-Wen	Chinese Taipei	4:04.92	7	9	
58	Irakli Revishvili	Georgia	4:05.18	6	9	
59	Hajder Ensar	Bosnia and Herzegovina	4:05.50	4	2	
60	Mandar Divase	India	4:06.18	1	6	
61	Berrada Morad	Morocco	4:06.48	4	5	
62	Marzouq Alsalem	Kuwait	4:07.43	5	0	
63	Esteban Enderica	Ecuador	4:07.58	5	7	
64	José Alberto Montoya	Costa Rica	4:08.84	4	7	
65	Gary Pineda	Guatemala	4:08.99	3	2	
66	Danny Yeo	Singapore	4:11.32	5	9	
67	Loai Abdulwahid Tashkandi	Saudi Arabia	4:12.19	4	3	
68	Colin Bensadon	Gibraltar	4:12.31	3	7	NR
69	Ahmed Jebrel	Palestine	4:12.94	3	5	
70	Antonio Tong	Macau	4:13.87	3	6	
71	Aleksandr Slepchenko	Kyrgyzstan	4:14.31	4	8	
72	Neil Agius	Malta	4:16.10	3	3	
73	Allan Gutiérrez Castro	Honduras	4:16.14	4	6	
74	Radhames Kalaf	Dominican Republic	4:16.29	4	0	
75	Rafael Alfaro	El Salvador	4:16.95	3	1	
76	Vitalii Khudiakov	Kyrgyzstan	4:17.26	3	4	
77	Luis Andres Martorell Name	Honduras	4:18.18	3	9	
78	Ngou Pok Man	Macau	4:18.21	2	4	
79	Cheah Mingzhe Marcus	Singapore	4:19.28	5	1	
80	Ignacio Iván Quevedo Bubba	Bolivia	4:20.09	2	5	
80	Omar Núñez	Nicaragua	4:20.09	3	8	
82	Heimanu Sichan	French Polynesia	4:20.11	4	9	
83	Ali Al Kaabi	United Arab Emirates	4:25.78	2	7	
84	Jean Marie Froget	Mauritius	4:26.48	2	3	
85	Paul Elaisa	Fiji	4:26.61	2	1	
86	Douglas Miller	Fiji	4:27.13	2	2	
87	Vincent Perry	French Polynesia	4:27.41	3	0	
88	Ahmed Majeed Ali Tayawi	Iraq	4:30.55	2	8	
89	Mathieu Marquet	Mauritius	4:32.36	2	6	
90	Adam Viktora	Seychelles	4:43.14	2	9	
91	Shin Kimura	Northern Mariana Islands	4:47.58	2	0	
92	Elio Berberi	Albania	4:49.85	1	5	
93	Henk Aloysius Lowe	Guyana	4:52.56	1	4	
94	Shameel Ibrahim	Maldives	5:28.11	1	3	

Legend: ER: European record; NR: National record

=== Final ===
Rank	Name	Nationality	Lane	Time	Notes
1st place, gold medalist(s)	Paul Biedermann	Germany	4	3:40.07	WR
2nd place, silver medalist(s)	Oussama Mellouli	Tunisia	3	3:41.11	AF
3rd place, bronze medalist(s)	Zhang Lin	China	5	3:41.35	AS
4	Peter Vanderkaay	United States	2	3:43.20	
5	Mads Glæsner	Denmark	6	3:44.40	NR
6	Gergő Kis	Hungary	8	3:46.30	
7	Ryan Cochrane	Canada	1	3:46.60	
8	David Davies	Great Britain	7	3:47.02	

Legend: WR: World record; AF: African record; AS: Asian record; NR: National record
