= Mathieu Marquet =

Mauritian swimmer

Personal information
- Full name: Mathieu Gilles Marquet
- Nationality: Mauritian
- Born: 11 January 1994 (age 32) Port Louis, Mauritius

Sport
- Sport: Swimming
- Strokes: backstroke, freestyle, medley

Mathieu Gilles Marquet (born 11 January 1994) is a Mauritian swimmer.

== Career ==
Marquet first competed for Mauritius at the 2009 World Championships in Rome, where he finished 79th in the 200 metre backstroke in 2:29.91, 89th in the 400 metre freestyle in 4:32.36, 90th in the 200 metre individual medley in 2:25.76, 106th in the 100 metre backstroke in 1:07.26, 112th in the 50 metre backstroke in 31.18, 122nd in the 200 metre freestyle in 2:06.44 and with Jean Hugues Gregoire, Ronny Vencatachellum and Jean Marie Froget finished 36th in the 4 × 100 metre freestyle relay.

At the 2011 World Championships in Shanghai, Marquet finished 57th in the 200 metre freestyle in 2:02.41.

At the 2012 Summer Olympics in London, Marquet finished 39th in the 200 metre freestyle in 1:58.91.

At the 2012 FINA World Swimming Championships (25 m) in Istanbul, Marquet finished 65th in the 200 metre freestyle in 1:57.07, 94th in the 100 metre freestyle in 53.54 and was disqualified in the 200 metre individual medley.

At the 2013 World Championships in Barcelona, Marquet finished 38th in the 50 metre backstroke in 28.54 and 56th in the 200 metre freestyle in 1:57.48.

In 2019, he represented Mauritius at the 2019 World Aquatics Championships held in Gwangju, South Korea. In 2019, he also represented Mauritius at the 2019 African Games held in Rabat, Morocco.

At the 2020 Summer Olympics, he competed in the men's 100 metre freestyle event.
