= Ronny Vencatachellum =

Mauritian swimmer

Personal information
- Full name: Ronny Ashley Vencatachellum
- Nationality: Mauritian
- Born: 15 January 1989 (age 37)

Sport
- Sport: Swimming
- Strokes: backstroke, breaststroke, freestyle, medley
- Updated on 13 January 2014

Ronny Ashley Vencatachellum (born 15 January 1989) is a Mauritian swimmer.

== Career ==
Vencatachellum first competed for Mauritius at the 2005 African Junior Swimming Championships in Beau-Bassin Rose-Hill, Mauritius where competing in the boy's 15 - 16 years age group he won bronze in both the 50 metre backstroke in 29.93 and in the 200 metre individual medley in 2:21.01. In other results, Vencatachellum finished 4th in the 100 metre backstroke in 1:04.91, 4th in the 200 metre backstroke in 2:21.69, 5th in the 400 metre individual medley in 5:10.81 and 19th in the 50 metre freestyle in 30.38.

At the 2006 FINA World Swimming Championships (25 m) in Shanghai, Vencatachellum finished 25th in the 400 metre individual medley in 4:59.61, 26th in the 200 metre backstroke in 2:18.44, 33rd in the 200 metre individual medley in 2:19.48, 39th in the 100 metre backstroke in 1:02.38, 42nd in the 50 metre backstroke in 29.23, 46th in the 100 metre individual medley in 1:02.91 and 79th in the 50 metre freestyle in 25.81.

At the 2008 African Swimming Championships in Johannesburg, Vencatachellum finished 7th in the 200 metre individual medley in 2:26.19, 8th in the 200 metre backstroke in 2:35.95, 8th in the 200 metre breaststroke in 32.86, 10th in the 50 metre backstroke in 29.72, 10th in the 100 metre backstroke in 1:08.81 and 17th in the 50 metre freestyle in 26.42.

At the 2009 World Championships in Rome, Vencatachellum finished 92nd in the 50 metre backstroke in 29.18, 98th in the 100 metre backstroke in 1:04.11, equal 116th in the 50 metre breaststroke in 32.13, 118th in the 100 metre breaststroke in 1:10.36, equal 147th in the 50 metre freestyle in 25.55, 165th in the 100 metre freestyle in 56.00 and was due compete but pulled out of the 200 metre backstroke. In the relays, Vencatachellum teamed up with Jean Hugues Gregoire, Mathieu Marquet and Jean Marie Froget to finish 36th in the 4 × 100 metre freestyle relay. In the 4 × 100 metre medley relay, Vencatachellum with Hugues Gregoire, Froget and Kevin Cheung were disqualified.
