= Jean Marie Froget =

Mauritian swimmer (born 1993)

Personal information
- Full name: Jean Marie Emmanuel Froget
- Nationality: Mauritian
- Born: 17 June 1993 (age 33) Port Louis, Mauritius

Sport
- Sport: Swimming
- Strokes: butterfly, medley, freestyle
- Updated on 13 January 2014

Jean Marie Emmanuel Froget (born 17 June 1993) is a Mauritian swimmer.

== Career ==
Froget first competed for Mauritius at the 2009 World Championships in Rome where he finished 84th in the 400 metre freestyle in 4:26.48, 85th in the 200 metre individual medley in 2:21.32, 70th in the 200 metre butterfly in 2:16.82, 121st in the 200 metre freestyle in 2:05.47 and 162nd in the 50 metre butterfly in 27.83. In the relays, Froget teamed up with Ronny Vencatachellum, Mathieu Marquet and Jean Hugues Gregoire to finish 36th in the 4 × 100 metre freestyle relay. In the 4 × 100 metre medley relay, Froget with Vencatachellum, Hugues Gregoire and Kevin Cheung were disqualified.

At the 2010 Summer Youth Olympics in Singapore he finished 41st in the 200 metre freestyle in 2:02.98.

He is currently the vice president of the Mauritius Swimming Federation.
