= Kevin Cheung =

Mauritian swimmer

Personal information
- Full name: Cheung Ho Yan
- Nationality: Mauritian
- Born: 23 February 1990 (age 36)

Sport
- Sport: Swimming
- Strokes: backstroke, breaststroke, freestyle
- Updated on 13 January 2014

Kevin Cheung (born Cheung Ho Yan; 23 February 1990) is a Mauritian swimmer.

== Career ==
Cheung first competed for Mauritius at the 2005 African Junior Swimming Championships in Beau-Bassin Rose-Hill, Mauritius where competing in the boy's 15 – 16 years age group he finished 4th in the 200 metre breaststroke in 2:42.39, 5th in the 100 metre breaststroke in 1:13.94 and 5th in the 50 metre breaststroke in 34.61.

At the 2007 World Championships in Melbourne, Cheung finished 74th in the 200 metre breaststroke in 2:47.26, 93rd in the 50 metre backstroke in 36.96, 96th in the 50 metre breaststroke in 33.26, 100th in the 100 metre breaststroke in 1:13.87 and 152nd in the 50 metre freestyle in 28.80.

At the 2009 World Championships in Rome, Cheung finished 75th in the 200 metre breaststroke in 2:38.31, 111th in the 50 metre breaststroke in 31.80, 117th in the 100 metre breaststroke in 1:10.25 and with Jean Hugues Gregoire, Ronny Vencatachellum and Jean Marie Froget was disqualified in the 4 × 100 metre medley relay.
