= Helge Meeuw =

German swimmer (born 1984)

Personal information
- Full name: Helge Folkert Meeuw
- Nationality: Germany
- Born: 29 August 1984 (age 42) Wiesbaden, Hesse, West Germany
- Height: 1.77 m (5 ft 10 in)
- Weight: 74 kg (163 lb)

Sport
- Sport: Swimming
- Strokes: Butterfly, Backstroke
Medal record
Men's swimming
Representing Germany
Olympic Games
Silver medal – second place	2004 Athens	4×100 m medley
World Championships (LC)
Silver medal – second place	2009 Rome	100 m backstroke
Silver medal – second place	2009 Rome	4×100 m medley
Bronze medal – third place	2003 Barcelona	4×200 m freestyle
Bronze medal – third place	2011 Shanghai	4×100 m medley
World Championships (SC)
Bronze medal – third place	2006 Shanghai	50 m backstroke
Bronze medal – third place	2006 Shanghai	100 m backstroke
European Championships (LC)
Gold medal – first place	2006 Budapest	50 m backstroke
Silver medal – second place	2012 Debrecen	100 m backstroke
Silver medal – second place	2012 Debrecen	4×100 m medley
European Championships (SC)
Gold medal – first place	2006 Helsinki	50 m backstroke
Gold medal – first place	2006 Helsinki	4×50 m medley
Silver medal – second place	2005 Trieste	200 m butterfly
Silver medal – second place	2006 Helsinki	100 m backstroke
Silver medal – second place	2006 Helsinki	200 m backstroke
Silver medal – second place	2007 Debrecen	50 m backstroke
Bronze medal – third place	2004 Vienna	50 m backstroke
Bronze medal – third place	2007 Debrecen	100 m backstroke
Bronze medal – third place	2008 Rijeka	100 m backstroke
Universiade
Gold medal – first place	2007 Bangkok	50 m backstroke
Gold medal – first place	2007 Bangkok	100 m backstroke
Silver medal – second place	2009 Belgrade	100 m backstroke

Helge Folkert Meeuw (born 29 August 1984 from Wiesbaden, West Germany) is an Olympic and national record holding swimmer from Germany. He swam for Germany at the:

- Olympics: 2004, 2008, 2012
- World Championships: 2003, 2005, 2007, 2009, 2011
- European Championships: 2006, 2012
- World University Games: 2007, 2009
- Short Course Worlds: 2006
- Short Course Europeans: 2004, 2005, 2006, 2007, 2008

At the 2008 German Swimming Championships in Berlin, he swam in 53.10 sec a new European Record at 100m backstroke. He also holds 200 m (short course and long course) backstroke German national records in swimming.

== Personal bests ==
Long course

- 100 m backstroke 52.27 NR
- 200 m backstroke 1:53.34 NR

Short course

- 200 m backstroke 1'51.51 NR

== Family ==
Both his parents, Folkert Meeuw and Jutta Weber, competed for West Germany in swimming, and both won medals at Olympic Games and World and European championships. His wife, Antje Buschschulte, also competed for Germany and won Olympic medals.
