= Jeux des îles =

Annual multi-sport event for youth athletes

The Jeux des îles (English: Games of the islands) is an annual multi-sport event for youth athletes from the 23 member countries of the association of Comité d'Organisation des Jeux des Iles (COJI).

== Participants ==
In the fourteen editions, the number of participating islands has changed from edition to edition, as delegations are not required to attend the event. There are, however, 23 islands registered at the COJI that have participated in at least one edition.

- Azores
- Balearic Islands
- Canary Islands
- Cape Verde
- Cyprus
- Corfu
- Corsica
- Crete
- Elba
- Faroe Islands
- Gibraltar
- Guadeloupe
- Haiti
- Jersey
- Korčula
- Madeira
- Malta
- Martinique
- Mayotte
- French Polynesia
- Réunion
- Sardinia
- Sicily
- Isle of Wight

== Editions ==
Edition	Venue	Island	Country
1997	Ajaccio	Corsica	France
1998	Ajaccio	Corsica	France
1999	Palermo	Sicily	Italy
2000	Funchal	Madeira	Portugal
2001	Palma de Mallorca	Balearic Islands	Spain
2002	Cagliari	Sardinia	Italy
2003	São Miguel Island	Azores	Portugal
2004	Las Palmas	Canary Islands	Spain
2005	Iraklio	Crete	Greece
2006	Palermo	Sicily	Italy
2007	Ajaccio	Corsica	France
2008	Basse-Terre	Guadeloupe	France
2009	Palma de Mallorca	Balearic Islands	Spain
2010	São Miguel Island	Azores	Portugal
2011	Palermo	Sicily	Italy
2012	Cagliari	Sardinia	Italy
2013	Ajaccio	Corsica	France
2014	Ajaccio	Corsica	France
2015	Angra do Heroísmo	Azores	Portugal
2016	Palma de Mallorca	Balearic Islands	Spain
2017	Fort-de-France	Martinique	France
2018	Catania	Sicily	Italy
2019	Ajaccio	Corsica	France
2022	Palma de Mallorca	Balearic Islands	Spain
2023	Ajaccio	Corsica	France
2024	Porto Vecchio	Corsica	France
