= Cameron van der Burgh =

South African swimmer (born 1988)

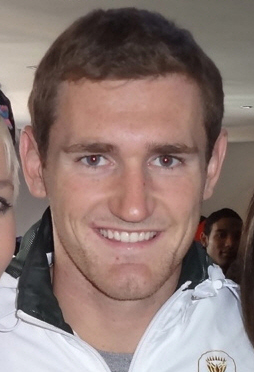
- van der Burgh in the 2008 Summer Olympics

Personal information
- National team: South Africa
- Born: 25 May 1988 (age 38) Pretoria, South Africa
- Height: 1.85 m (6 ft 1 in)
- Weight: 85 kg (187 lb)

Sport
- Sport: Swimming
- Strokes: Breaststroke
- Club: Energy Standard
Medal record
Men's swimming
Representing South Africa
Event	1st	2nd	3rd
Olympic Games	1	1	0
World Championships (LC)	2	3	5
World Championships (SC)	4	3	1
Commonwealth Games	4	2	3
African Games	6	0	0
African Championships	1	0	0
Total	18	9	9
Olympic Games
Gold medal – first place	2012 London	100 m breaststroke
Silver medal – second place	2016 Rio de Janeiro	100 m breaststroke
World Championships (LC)
Gold medal – first place	2009 Rome	50 m breaststroke
Gold medal – first place	2013 Barcelona	50 m breaststroke
Silver medal – second place	2013 Barcelona	100 m breaststroke
Silver medal – second place	2015 Kazan	50 m breaststroke
Silver medal – second place	2015 Kazan	100 m breaststroke
Bronze medal – third place	2007 Melbourne	50 m breaststroke
Bronze medal – third place	2009 Rome	100 m breaststroke
Bronze medal – third place	2011 Shanghai	50 m breaststroke
Bronze medal – third place	2011 Shanghai	100 m breaststroke
Bronze medal – third place	2017 Budapest	50 m breaststroke
World Championships (SC)
Gold medal – first place	2010 Dubai	100 m breaststroke
Gold medal – first place	2016 Windsor	50 m breaststroke
Gold medal – first place	2018 Hangzhou	50 m breaststroke
Gold medal – first place	2018 Hangzhou	100 m breaststroke
Silver medal – second place	2008 Manchester	100 m breaststroke
Silver medal – second place	2010 Dubai	50 m breaststroke
Silver medal – second place	2014 Doha	50 m breaststroke
Bronze medal – third place	2008 Manchester	50 m breaststroke
Commonwealth Games
Gold medal – first place	2010 Delhi	50 m breaststroke
Gold medal – first place	2010 Delhi	100 m breaststroke
Gold medal – first place	2014 Glasgow	50 m breaststroke
Gold medal – first place	2018 Gold Coast	50 m breaststroke
Silver medal – second place	2010 Delhi	4×100 m medley
Silver medal – second place	2014 Glasgow	100 m breaststroke
Bronze medal – third place	2014 Glasgow	4×100 m medley
Bronze medal – third place	2018 Gold Coast	100 m breastroke
Bronze medal – third place	2018 Gold Coast	4×100 m medley
African Games
Gold medal – first place	2007 Algiers	50 m breaststroke
Gold medal – first place	2007 Algiers	100 m breaststroke
Gold medal – first place	2011 Maputo	50 m breaststroke
Gold medal – first place	2011 Maputo	100 m breaststroke
Gold medal – first place	2015 Brazzaville	50 m breaststroke
Gold medal – first place	2015 Brazzaville	100 m breaststroke
African Championships
Gold medal – first place	2016 Bloemfontein	50 m breaststroke

Cameron van der Burgh OIS (born 25 May 1988) is a retired South African competitive swimmer and hedge fund analyst. He is Africa's first home-trained world record holder and individual male Olympic champion. He is married to longtime partner Nefeli Valakelis.

== Swimming career ==
Van der Burgh trains with Dirk Lange and is based in Pretoria. He has represented South Africa at the 2008 Summer Olympics, at the 2012 Summer Olympics where he won the gold medal in the 100-meter breaststroke in a new world record, and the 2016 Olympics. He has won numerous World Championship medals since his debut in 2007 when he took a bronze medal. Three times he has won the FINA overall World Cup.

Van der Burgh set his first world long-course record (27.06s) in the 50 m breaststroke in the semifinals at South African nationals in April 2009, cutting 0.12 of a second from Oleg Lisogor's old world record set in 2002. He won the world title in the same year at the Rome championship, also in the 50 m breaststroke.

He won the 50m breaststroke at the 2010 Commonwealth Games in a time of 27.18 seconds in a new games record and the 100m world title at the 2010 short course world championships. He won the 100m breaststroke gold medal at the 2012 Summer Olympics in a new world record time of 58.46 seconds, and paid tribute to late world champion Alexander Dale Oen afterwards. Van der Burgh later admitted to breaking the rules by utilising illegal dolphin kicks during the race which was confirmed by video replays showing Van der Burgh taking three dolphin kicks. Subsequently, FINA have suggested they may consider underwater video evidence to judge results, although van der Burgh's results and medal are not under threat.

At the 2014 Commonwealth Games, he won the gold in the men's 50 m breaststroke in a new games record. He won silver in the 100 m breaststroke behind Adam Peaty, and was part of the South African team that won bronze in the men's 4 x 100 m relay. The 2014 Commonwealth Games marked the beginning of his major rivalry with World and Olympic champion Adam Peaty. Although Peaty has maintained the upper hand at Olympic and World level, especially in the 100 metres breaststroke, Van Der Burgh has remained his main international rival, and remains the only swimmer to have beaten him since his breakthrough, on both occasions denying Peaty the only major silverware missing from his collection, the Commonwealth Games 50 metre breaststroke title (a race not on the Olympic calendar).

In 2015 Cameron went on to Break the World Record in the heats of the 50m Breaststroke at the World Championships but settled for silver in the final. He went on further to earn another silver in the 100m Breaststroke. Later that year he went on to record a 24 race unbeaten streak to win the overall men's World Cup, the third of his career.

At the 2016 Olympic Games Cameron secured the silver medal in the 100m Breaststroke earning his second Olympic Medal. Later that year he went on the win another World Championship title at the World Short Cours championships in the 50m Breaststroke.

In December 2018, van der Burgh announced his retirement from competitive swimming following the conclusion of the 2018 FINA Short Course World Swimming Championships, where he won two individual gold medals.

== Personal life ==
Van der Burgh went to Glenstantia Primary as a young boy but matriculated at Crawford College in 2006. He studied Financial Management through UNISA part-time and was interested in becoming an entrepreneur after his swimming career. Since the London Olympics, van der Burgh has received various awards including South African Style Icon 2012, GQ 7th best-dressed man 2012, and has gone on to make various magazine covers and appeared in South African TV shows. He has made many appearances around the country giving motivational speeches and attending gala dinners. He has been linked to a few charities and recently fed underprivileged kids in Alexandria with his Olympic earnings. Most recently he has become the ambassador for Steps, a charity that treats kids born with clubfoot.

== Sponsors ==
Following the 2012 Summer Olympics, van der Burgh received several sponsorships, including Arena, Investec, Audi, USN, and Tag Heuer, with his most recent being a four-year deal with multi-brand corporation Procter & Gamble as the new Head and Shoulders ambassador, joining the likes of Michael Phelps, Lionel Messi and Jenson Button. He is estimated to be earning between $200,000 and $400,000 per year from sponsorship deals.

== Investment career ==
Van der Burgh developed a passion for the financial markets from a young age when he won the JSE School Challenge in 2005 and has gone to further manage a portion of his own capital ever since. He recently revealed he enjoys commodities in particular.

Cameron joined Andurand Capital, a hedge fund in London, as an analyst in 2018.

== See also ==
- List of Olympic medalists in swimming (men)
- World record progression 50 metres breaststroke

Records
Preceded by Felipe França Silva	Men's 50-metre breaststroke world record-holder 29 July 2009 – 22 August 2014	Succeeded by Adam Peaty
Preceded by Oleg Lisogor	Men's 50-metre breaststroke world record-holder (25m); 8 November 2008 – present	Succeeded by Incumbent
Preceded by Brenton Rickard	Men's 100-metre breaststroke world record-holder (long course); 29 July 2012 – 17 April 2015	Succeeded by Adam Peaty
Preceded by Ed Moses	Men's 100-metre breaststroke world record-holder (25m); 9 November 2008 – 15 November 2020	Succeeded by Adam Peaty
Awards
Preceded by Oussama Mellouli	Swimming World Magazine's; African Swimmer of the Year; 2009–2011	Succeeded by Chad le Clos
Sporting positions
Preceded by Randall Bal; Chad le Clos	FINA World Cup overall male winner 2008, 2009; 2015	Succeeded by Thiago Pereira; Vladimir Morozov
