= Edoardo Giorgetti =

Italian swimmer (born 1989)

Personal information
- Full name: Edoardo Giorgetti
- Nationality: Italy
- Born: 5 February 1989 (age 37) Cagli, Marche, Italy

Sport
- Sport: Swimming
- Strokes: Breaststroke
- Club: Circolo Canottieri Aniene
Medal record
European Championships (SC)
Silver medal – second place	2008 Rijeka	200 m breaststroke
World University Games
Bronze medal – third place	2013 Kazan	100 m breaststroke
Mediterranean Games
Silver medal – second place	2009 Pescara	200m breaststroke

Edoardo Giorgetti (born 5 February 1989) is an Italian breaststroke swimmer.

In 2006, Giorgetti was Junior World Champion in 100 m and 200 m breaststroke, and in 4×100 m medley relay.

In 2007, Giorgetti was Junior European Champion in 200 m breaststroke and won the silver medal in 100 m of the same stroke behind Dániel Gyurta. He also represented Italy at the 2007 World Aquatics Championships swimming 100 m breaststroke.

In 2008, Giorgetti set the new short course European record for 200 m breaststroke in 2:05.02.

== See also ==
- 2006 FINA Youth World Swimming Championships
- 2007 European Junior Swimming Championships
