= Donal O'Neill (swimmer) =

Irish swimmer

Personal information
- Born: August 5, 1980 (age 45) Dublin, Ireland

Sport
- Sport: Swimming

Donal O'Neill (born 5 August 1980) is an Irish swimmer. He holds several Irish records. He competed at the 2009 World Aquatics Championships and at several European Swimming Championships.
