= Daniel Velez =

Puerto Rican Olympic swimmer (born 1983)

Personal information
- Full name: Daniel Velez
- National team: Puerto Rico
- Born: 9 December 1983 (age 42) San Juan, Puerto Rico
- Height: 1.86 m (6 ft 1 in)
- Weight: 77 kg (170 lb)

Sport
- Sport: Swimming
- Strokes: Breaststroke
- College team: North Carolina State University (U.S.)
- Coach: Brooks Teal (North Carolina State U.)

Daniel Velez (born December 9, 1983) is a Puerto Rican retired swimmer, who specialized in breaststroke events. He represented his nation Puerto Rico at the 2008 Summer Olympics, and has won a career total of three medals (two golds and one bronze) at the 2005 Maccabiah Games in Netanya, Israel.

Velez was a member of the NC State Wolfpack swimming and diving team under head coach Brooks Teal, while pursuing his degree in psychology at North Carolina State University in Raleigh, North Carolina.

Five months before the Games, at an Olympic qualifying event, he threw down a 100-metre lifetime best of 1:03.63 to slip past the FINA B-cut (1:03.72) by almost a tenth of a second (0.1) at the All-American Championships in Austin, Texas, United States.

== 2008 Olympics ==
At the Olympic preliminary heats in September, 2008, in the men's 100 m breaststroke, in Beijing, Velez slipped to the front from lane one to touch the wall first in heat three with a remarkable Puerto Rican record in 1:01.80, slashing 1.83 seconds off his own entry standard and beating India's Sandeep Sejwal, who finished behind him, in a close finish by only a small fraction of a second. Despite his quality performance for a national competitor, in the intense international competition of the Olympics, he ended his Olympic campaign with a thirty-third place overall.

In non-Olympic international competition, Velez won a bronze medal in both the 50 and 100-meter breaststroke at the 2010 Central American and Caribbean Games in Mayaguez, Puerto Rico.
