= Mamadou Cisse =

Guinean swimmer

Personal information
- Born: June 2, 1986 (age 40) Fria, Guinea

Sport
- Sport: Swimming

Mamadou Cisse (born June 2, 1986) is a Guinean swimmer. He competed in the men's 50 metre freestyle at the 2008 Summer Olympics, finishing 89th.
