= Erik Rajohnson =

Czech-Malagasy former swimmer (born 1985)

Personal information
- Full name: Erik Rajohnson
- National team: Madagascar
- Born: 4 February 1985 (age 41) Antananarivo, Madagascar
- Height: 1.79 m (5 ft 10 in)
- Weight: 78 kg (172 lb)

Sport
- Sport: Swimming
- Strokes: Breaststroke
- Club: KPS Ostrava (CZE)

Erik Rajohnson (born February 4, 1985) is a Czech-Malagasy former swimmer, who specialized in breaststroke events. He represented his nation Madagascar at the 2008 Summer Olympics, placing among the top 60 swimmers in the men's 100 m breaststroke.

During his swimming career, Rajohnson trained full-time at Ostrava's sport club in the Czech Republic, became multiple junior and senior champion of Czech Republic in many individual and team courses. Erik was a member of national swimming team A and represented Czech Republic on various international events.

In 2003 Rajohnson became a member of Madagascar national swimming team and debuted his new career on African Island Games (JIOI) with three medals in Breaststroke and Individual Medley.

Between years 2003 and 2007 Rajohnson held many national records in most categories and swimming styles and represented Madagascar on several FINA World Swimming Championships.

In 2007 year Erik took first Madagascar's gold medal (and another two silver) in swimming on African Island games (JIOI) in men's 200m breaststroke course and has been invited by FINA to participate on Beijing 2008 Summer Olympics.

Rajohnson was invited by FINA through the Universality rule to compete for Madagascar in the men's 100 m breaststroke at the 2008 Summer Olympics in Beijing. Swimming in heat two, he swam for 1:08.42 and put him in fifth place and fifty-ninth overall on the evening prelims. His personal best for this course is 1:05.32

Later that Rajohnson participated on long course FINA's World swimming championships in Rome and short course in Dubai where he has set several national records. He continued with swimming until his retirement from the sport in 2011 to focus on his stint as an international business development project manager for bilingual languages (French and English).
