= Matjaž Markič =

Slovenian swimmer (born 1983)

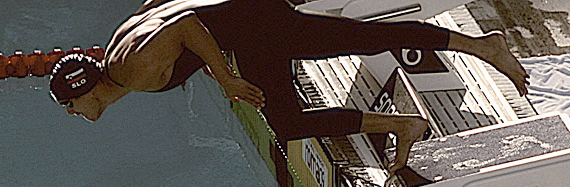

Personal information
- Born: 12 January 1983 (age 43) Koper, SR Slovenia, SFR Yugoslavia
Medal record
Men's Swimming
Representing Slovenia
European Championships (LC)
Bronze medal – third place	2004 Madrid	50 m breaststroke
Bronze medal – third place	2006 Budapest	50 m breaststroke
European Championships (SC)
Gold medal – first place	2008 Rijeka	50 m breaststroke
Bronze medal – third place	2005 Trieste	50 m breaststroke
Mediterranean Games
Bronze medal – third place	2005 Almería	50 m breaststroke

Matjaž Markič (born 12 January 1983 in Koper) is a male breaststroke swimmer from Slovenia, who won the gold medal in the men's 50 m breaststroke event at the 2008 European SC Championships in Rijeka. He represented his native country at the 2008 Summer Olympics in Beijing, PR China, finishing in 24th place in the men's 100 m breaststroke.
