= Grigory Falko =

Russian swimmer (born 1987)

Personal information
- Full name: Grigory Alexeyevich Falko
- Nationality: Russia
- Born: 9 May 1987 (age 39) Leningrad, Soviet Union
- Height: 1.88 m (6 ft 2 in)
- Weight: 78 kg (172 lb)

Sport
- Sport: Swimming
- Strokes: Breaststroke
Medal record
Representing Russia
European Championships (LC)
Gold medal – first place	2008 Eindhoven	200 m breaststroke
Gold medal – first place	2008 Eindhoven	4×100 m medley
European Championships (SC)
Gold medal – first place	2007 Debrecen	100 m breaststroke
Silver medal – second place	2005 Trieste	200 m breaststroke
Bronze medal – third place	2004 Vienna	200 m breaststroke
Summer Universiade
Gold medal – first place	2007 Bangkok	4×100 m medley

Grigory Alekseevich Falko (Russian: Григорий Алексеевич Фалько; born 9 May 1987) is an Olympic and national-record-holding breaststroke swimmer from Russia. He swam for Russia at the 2004 and 2008 Olympics.

He swam for Russia at:

- Olympics: 2004, 2008
- World Championships: 2005, 2007, 2009
- World University Games: 2007
- European Championships: 2008
- SC Worlds: 2010
- SC Europeans: 2004, 2005, 2007

Falko is married to the Olympic synchronized swimmer Alexandra Patskevich, they have a son Semyon (born 2019).

== See also ==
- List of Russian records in swimming
