= Max Siedentopf =

Namibian-German artist, designer, publisher and director

- Born: 27 June 1991 (age 34); Tegernsee, Germany
- Website: maxsiedentopf.com

Maximilian "Max" Siedentopf (born 27 June 1991) is a Namibian-German artist, designer, publisher and director. He is known for having set up an installation titled Toto Forever in the Namib Desert which consists of a ring of large white blocks atop of which sit six speakers attached to a solar-powered MP3 player configured to continuously play the 1982 song "Africa" by the American band Toto. The exact location of the installation has not been disclosed.

== Early life ==
Siedentopf grew up in the city of Windhoek in Namibia, and continues to work in Berlin, Los Angeles, Amsterdam, and London. He is a former competitive swimmer.

== Career ==
In June 2019, Siedentopf starred in the music video for "Mine Right Now", a song by Norwegian singer Sigrid. This was due to Sigrid's flight being cancelled, the singer therefore being unable to appear in the video herself.
