= Ivan Demyanenko =

Uzbek swimmer (born 1989)

Personal information
- Full name: Ivan Demyanenko
- National team: Uzbekistan
- Born: 23 April 1989 (age 37) Tashkent, Uzbek SSR, Soviet Union
- Height: 1.79 m (5 ft 10 in)
- Weight: 65 kg (143 lb)

Sport
- Sport: Swimming
- Strokes: Breaststroke

Ivan Demyanenko (Uzbek: Иван Демьяненко; born April 23, 1989) is an Uzbek swimmer, who specialized in breaststroke events. He represented his nation Uzbekistan at the 2008 Summer Olympics, finishing in the top 60 of the men's 100 m breaststroke.

Demyanenko qualified for the men's 100 m breaststroke at the 2008 Summer Olympics in Beijing, by clearing a FINA B-standard time of 1:03.59 from the Belarus Swimming Championships in Minsk. He challenged seven other swimmers on the third heat, including three-time Olympians Malick Fall of Senegal and Alwin de Prins of Luxembourg. Demyanenko rounded out the field in last place by two thirds of a second (0.67) behind Barbados' Andrei Cross with a time of 1:05.14. Demyanenko failed to advance into the semifinals, as he placed fifty-sixth overall in the prelims.
