= Pascal Wollach =

Canadian swimmer (born 1987)

Personal information
- Full name: Pascal Wollach
- National team: Canada
- Born: October 16, 1987 (age 38) Melfort, Saskatchewan
- Height: 1.925 m (6 ft 4 in)
- Weight: 94 kg (207 lb)

Sport
- Sport: Swimming
- Strokes: Freestyle, backstroke
- Club: University of Calgary Swim Club
- College team: Auburn University
Medal record
Men's swimming
Pan American Games
Bronze medal – third place	2007 Rio de Janeiro	4x200 m freestyle

Pascal Wollach (born October 16, 1987) is a swimmer from Canada, who mostly competes in the freestyle and backstroke events. He claimed a bronze medal (4 × 200 m freestyle relay) at the 2007 Pan American Games in Rio de Janeiro, Brazil.

Wollach is now retired from swimming. He graduated in 2016 from the University of Pennsylvania, School of Dental Medicine and recently started a career in dentistry.
