= Hendrik Feldwehr =

German swimmer (born 1986)

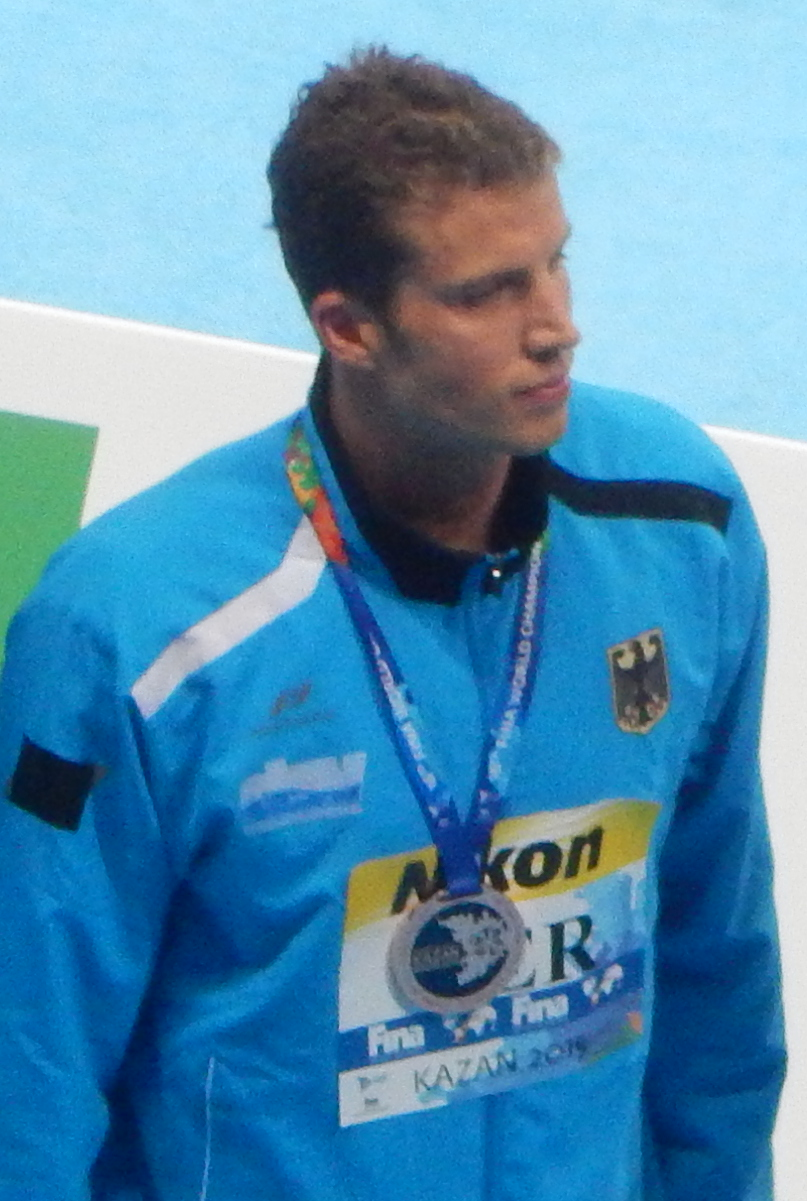
- Feldwehr at Kazan 2015

Personal information
- Born: 18 August 1986 (age 39) Bremerhaven, West Germany
- Height: 192 cm (6 ft 4 in)
- Weight: 90 kg (198 lb)
- Spouse: Isabelle Härle

Sport
- Sport: Swimming
- Strokes: Breaststroke
Medal record
Men's swimming
Representing Germany
World Championships (LC)
Silver medal – second place	2009 Rome	4×100 m medley
Bronze medal – third place	2011 Shanghai	4×100 m medley
Bronze medal – third place	2015 Kazan	4×100 m mixed medley
European Championships (SC)
Gold medal – first place	2010 Eindhoven	4×50 m medley
Silver medal – second place	2009 Istanbul	4×50 m medley
Silver medal – second place	2010 Eindhoven	100 m breaststroke
Bronze medal – third place	2010 Eindhoven	50 m breaststroke
Bronze medal – third place	2013 Herning	4×50 m medley

Hendrik Feldwehr (born 18 August 1986) is a German swimmer, who swam at the 2012 Summer Olympics.

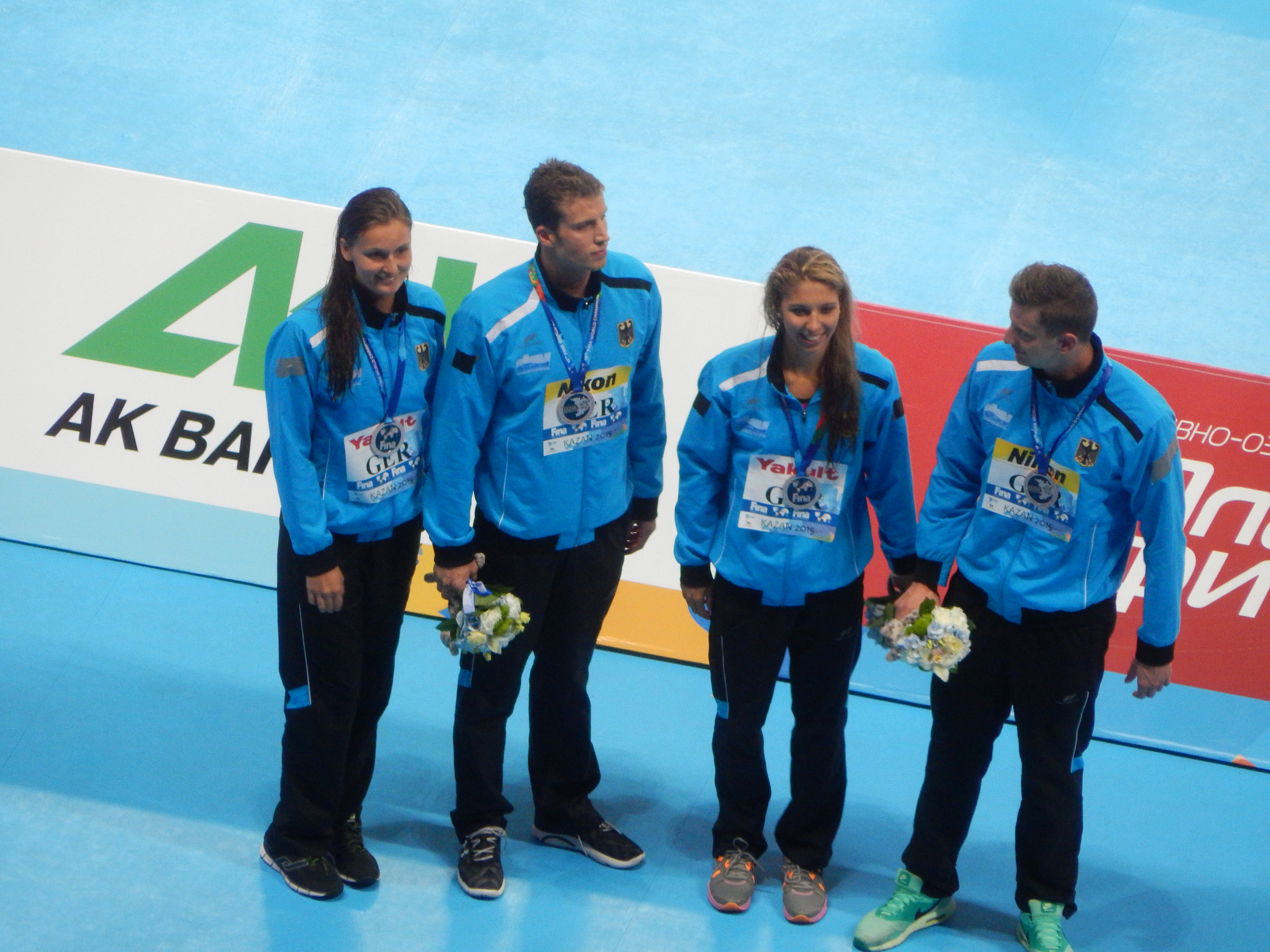
Feldwehr at Kazan 2015 (2nd from left)

He married German former swimmer Isabelle Härle.
