= Rezne Wong =

Personal information
- Born: May 12, 1991 (age 35)

Sport
- Sport: Swimming
- Club: Hawaii Rainbow Warriors
- College team: University of Hawaii

Eli "Rezne" Wong (born May 12, 1991) is a national-level swimmer from the Northern Mariana Islands. He swam at 3 World Championships (2007, 2009 and 2011), and is to also swim at the 2013 World Championships. He attended and swam for the USA's University of Hawaii (2009-2013).
