= Dragoș Agache =

Romanian swimmer

Personal information
- Nationality: Romania
- Born: 8 March 1984 (age 42) Brăila, Romania
- Height: 1.75 m (5 ft 9 in)
- Weight: 75 kg (165 lb)

Sport
- Sport: Swimming
- Strokes: Breaststroke
- Club: CS Farul Constanta (ROU)
- College team: Iowa Hawkeyes (USA)
- Coach: Octavian Tileaga (ROU)
Medal record
Men's swimming
Representing Romania
European Championships
Silver medal – second place	2010 Budapest	50 m breaststroke

Dragoș Agache (Romanian pronunciation: [ˈdraɡoʃ aˈɡake]; born March 8, 1984, in Brăila) is a Romanian swimmer, who specialized in breaststroke events. He set a new Romanian record of 27.47 to collect a silver medal in the 50 m breaststroke at the 2010 European Aquatics Championships in Budapest, Hungary.

Agache qualified for the men's 100 m breaststroke at the 2012 Summer Olympics in London, by clearing a FINA B-cut of 1:01.19 from the World Championships in Shanghai, China. He challenged seven other swimmers on the third heat, including two-time Olympians Martin Liivamägi of Estonia and Carlos Almeida of Portugal. He rounded out the field to last place by less than 0.14 of a second behind Poland's Dawid Szulich and Israel's Imri Ganiel in 1:02.93. Agache failed to advance into the semifinals, as he shared a thirty-seventh place tie with four-time Olympian Malick Fall of Senegal on the first day of preliminaries.

Agache is a former member of the swimming team for the Iowa Hawkeyes, and a graduate of management information systems at the University of Iowa in University Heights, Iowa (2008).
