= Vincent Perry =

American businessman and industrialist

Vincent Perry was an American businessman and industrialist. Perry built and operated a number of textile mills in late 19th century Philadelphia and Germantown.

== Biography ==
Perry was born in England in the mid 1840s. In 1855 he immigrated to the United States, where he worked for in a workshop that produced stockings. With help from his nephew (who also immigrated to the United States), Perry founded his own stocking company in 1870. However, the business failed due to increasingly cost effective silk stockings outselling cotton and wool stockings. In 1884 Perry returned to the textile business with the opening of a factory specially designed to produce elastic cords and surgical tubing. Specifically, the mills Perry built were designed to run on gas power, as opposed to older and less efficient hydro or steam power. This business met with success, and Perry's company became the largest single producer of surgical tubing in turn of the century Philadelphia, supplying a number of hospitals and clinics. This success in turn allowed Perry, his son Fergus, and his nephew (whom he named as partners in his company) to open five mills in Philadelphia and Germantown, producing tubing, electrical wiring, and thread.
