= Ihor Borysyk =

Ukrainian swimmer (born 1984)

Personal information
- Full name: Ігор Борисик
- Nationality: Ukraine
- Born: 2 June 1984 (age 42) Simferopol, Ukrainian SSR, Soviet Union
- Height: 1.82 m (6 ft 0 in)
- Weight: 75 kg (165 lb)

Sport
- Sport: Swimming
- Strokes: Breaststroke
Medal record
Men's swimming
World Championships (SC)
| Gold medal – first place | 2008 Manchester | 100 m breaststroke |
| Silver medal – second place | 2008 Manchester | 200 m breaststroke |
European Championships (SC)
| Gold medal – first place | 2007 Debrecen | 100 m breaststroke |
| Gold medal – first place | 2008 Rijeka | 100 m breaststroke |
| Silver medal – second place | 2012 Chartres | 200 m breaststroke |
| Bronze medal – third place | 2004 Vienna | 100 m breaststroke |
| Bronze medal – third place | 2008 Rijeka | 200 m breaststroke |
| Bronze medal – third place | 2009 Istanbul | 100 m breaststroke |
Summer Universiade
| Gold medal – first place | 2007 Bangkok | 50 m breaststroke |
| Gold medal – first place | 2009 Belgrade | 100 m breaststroke |
| Gold medal – first place | 2009 Belgrade | 200 m breaststroke |
European Junior Championships
| Bronze medal – third place | 2002 Linz | 100 m breaststroke |

Ihor Borysyk (Ukrainian: Ігор Вікторович Борисик; born 2 June 1984) is a retired Ukrainian swimmer. He was born in Simferopol.

At the 2009 Ukraine National Cup, he swam a time of 58.67 seconds in a 100-meter breaststroke time-trial, a result that was under the world record at the time.
