= Lennart Stekelenburg =

Dutch swimmer (born 1986)

Personal information
- Full name: Lennart Stekelenburg
- Nationality: Netherlands
- Born: October 22, 1986 (age 39) Rotterdam, Netherlands
- Height: 1.84 m (6 ft 0 in)
- Weight: 78 kg (172 lb)

Sport
- Sport: Swimming
- Strokes: Breaststroke
- Club: Nationaal Zweminstituut Amsterdam
Medal record
Men's swimming
Representing Netherlands
European Championships (LC)
Bronze medal – third place	2010 Budapest	50 m breaststroke
Bronze medal – third place	2010 Budapest	4×100 m medley

Lennart Stekelenburg (born 22 October 1986) is a Dutch swimmer who specialises in breaststroke. He is the current national record holder in the 50 m, 100 m and 200 m breaststroke at the long course and is part of the 4 × 100 m relay team who hold the Dutch long course record.

== Swimming career ==
After winning a silver medal in the 50 m breast and a bronze medal in the 100 m breast at the European Junior Swimming Championships 2004 in Lisbon, Portugal. Stekelenburg made his international senior debut at the 2005 World Aquatics Championships in Montreal, Quebec, Canada where he was eliminated in both 50 m and 100 m breaststroke. In the following years he swam several European Championships making his best performance at the 2008 European Aquatics Championships in Eindhoven in his home country the Netherlands, ending up 6th in the 50 m breaststroke final after swimming a national record in the semi-finals.

=== 2008/2009 season ===
Stekelenburg qualified for the 2009 World Aquatics Championships during the Swim Cup Eindhoven 2008, in early December, with a national record at the 100 m breaststroke. One week later he took part in the European Short Course Swimming Championships 2008 in Rijeka, Croatia where he ended 8th in the 100 m breaststroke but was eliminated in the heats of the 50 m and 200 m breaststroke.

== Personal bests ==
Short course
Event	Time	Date	Location
50 m breast	26.85	2010-12-05	Amsterdam, Netherlands
100 m breast	58.79	2010-12-05	Dubai, United Arab Emirates

Long course
Event	Time	Date	Location
50 m breast	NR 27.44	2010-08-13	Dubai, United Arab Emirates
100 m breast	NR 59.50	2009-04-19	Amsterdam, Netherlands

== See also ==
- List of swimmers
- List of Dutch records in swimming
