= Barry Murphy (swimmer) =

Irish swimmer (born 1985)

Medal record

Men's swimming

Representing Ireland

European Championships (SC)
Bronze medal – third place	2013 Herning	50 m breaststroke

Barry Murphy (born 5 October 1985) is an Irish swimmer from Dublin, Ireland. Despite setting 50 m and 100 m freestyle national records in 2008, Murphy just missed qualifying for Ireland's team at the 2008 Summer Olympics. He did, however, manage to qualify for the 2012 Summer Olympics.

Murphy was educated at Belvedere College, Dublin. He is a member of the Aer Lingus Swimming Club. In September 2005, Murphy began attending, and competing for, the USA's University of Tennessee; the 2008–09 school year marked his senior year of swimming for the Tennessee Volunteers.

== Meet results ==
=== European Championships, Budapest 2006 ===
At the 2006 Irish Open Short Course Championships, Murphy broke the Irish record in the 100 m freestyle record in a time of 48.97 and also the 100 m individual medley record in a time of 55.88 seconds. One week later at the 2006 European Championships in Budapest, he broke both the 50 m freestyle record in a time of 22.63 and also Earl McCarthy's 10-year-old record in 100 m freestyle in a time of 50.79.

He also holds a number of Irish junior records including 50 m breaststroke.

=== European SC Championships, Rijeka 2008 ===
He broke the Irish senior record for the 50 m breaststroke in a time of 28.37 qualifying him for the semi-finals, where he finished 16th.

At the 2008 European Short Course Championships Murphy broke four Irish records, cutting 0.75 off his own 50 m freestyle record in 21.71, the old time was 22.46. In the semi-final, he lowered his record once again to 21.53. He also broke Andrew Bree's 100 m breaststroke record in a time of 59.51; the previous record stood at 59.98. His 50 m split of 27.57 was also a national record.

Murphy also finished 4th in the 50 m breaststroke at the same 2008 European SC Championships in a new national record of 26.73 seconds, just 0.07 seconds outside the medals.

Murphy also broke his own national records in the 100 m freestyle and 100 m individual medley recording 48.69 & 55.34 respectively.

=== NCAA Championships, College Station, TX 2009 ===
Murphy set a new University of Tennessee Men's record in the 50 yd freestyle with a 19.14.

=== World Championships, Rome 2009 ===
Murphy swam the meet of his life at the World Swimming Championships in Rome, in 2009. He became the first Irishman to swim a sub 50 second 100 m freestyle, leading off the Irish 4 × 100 m freestyle relay with a 49.95. Later in the meet, he lowered his record again with a 49.76. The relay also set the Irish record.

He also tied the 100 m breaststroke Irish record. The record was set in 2008 at the Beijing Games by Murphy's good friend and Tennessee Teammate Andrew Bree. Both men held the record at 1:01.76 at the time.

Murphy had the swim of his life in the heats of the men's 50 m breaststroke. He set a new World Championship record and Irish record with a time of 27.26. This time qualified him for the Semi-final of the 50 m breaststroke. In doing so, Murphy became the first Irishman to achieve this feat. In the semi-final, Murphy swam a 27.38, just 0.12 seconds from making the final.

Murphy's final individual swim of the meet was the 50 m freestyle. He set a new Irish record of 22.14 and finished 19th. He missed the semis by three spots and was just 0.15 seconds outside the top 16.

Murphy was also a member of the 4x100 medley relay that set Irish records. His split of 60.6 on the breaststroke leg. This was the fastest in Irish History.

=== Club Wolverine International Elite Team ===
After the year in which Murphy completed his undergraduate degree at the University of Tennessee, he moved to Ann Arbor, to train under world-renowned sprint coach Mike Bottom and swim for the prestigious Club Wolverine. Murphy trains as a part of the International Elite Team. This is a group of international swimmers dedicated to bettering themselves, the community and the sport by training, promoting and evolving swimming.

=== European Championships, Budapest, 2010 ===
After just 7 weeks under Coach Bottom, Murphy travelled to the European Swimming Championships in Budapest. In the 100 breaststroke, Murphy swam to a textile suit best of 1:02.43.

The 50 breaststroke was next. Murphy progressed through the heats, semis and final in a 28.08, 27.60 and 27.99. This was the first time an Irishman had qualified for a sprint final in a European Championship. The semi-final time of 27.60 was ranked 6th in the world at the time, and this was also the highest an Irishman had been ranked for many years.

=== Indianapolis, USA, 2011 ===
Murphy won the gold medal in the 100 m breaststroke final at the Indianapolis Grand Prix on 3 March 2011. His time of 1:00.77 was an Irish senior record. This time was within the qualification period and qualifying time for the London 2012 Olympics. This made Barry the first Irish male to qualify for London, and possibly the first swimmer in the World too.

=== London Olympics 2012 ===
Murphy was training for the London 2012 Olympics, at Michigan University. A documentary was made about this process, which included reference to his Indianapolis 2011 result but which did not discuss how far he went with his dream.

Murphy qualified for the 2012 Olympics, at both the 50 m freestyle and the 100 m breaststroke, finishing in 29th place in both events.

== Charity work ==
Barry Murphy became an ambassador for the Asthma Society of Ireland in 2012. Barry was diagnosed with asthma at the age of fifteen but keeps his asthma under control through proper asthma management under the supervision of a healthcare professional. In August 2012 he fronted the launch of ‘Asthma Coach’ an iPhone App designed to help people manage their asthma.
