= Swimming at the 2005 World Aquatics Championships – Men's 200 metre freestyle =

Men's 200m freestyle at the 2005 FINA World Aquatics Championships
- Dates: 25 July (prelims, semifinals); 26 July (final)
- Competitors: 95
- Winning time: 1:45.20 AM

Medalists
gold medal	Michael Phelps	United States
silver medal	Grant Hackett	Australia
bronze medal	Ryk Neethling	South Africa

The men's 200 freestyle at the 11th FINA World Aquatics Championships swam 25+26 July 2005 in the Olympic pool at Parc Jean-Drapeau in Montreal, Canada. 95 swimmers were entered in the preliminary heats, which swam in the morning of July 25. The top-16 swimmers from the prelims advanced on to semifinal heats that evening. From the semifinals, the top 8 swimmers advanced onto the next night's final.

The existing records at the start of the event were:

- World record (WR): 1:44.06, Ian Thorpe (Australia), 25 July 2001 in Fukuoka, Japan.
- Championship record (CR): same

== Results ==
=== Final ===
Place	Name	Nationality	Time	Note
1	Michael Phelps	USA	1:45.20	AM
2	Grant Hackett	Australia	1:46.14	
3	Ryk Neethling	South Africa	1:46.63	
4	Brent Hayden	Canada	1:46.85	
5	Nicholas Sprenger	Australia	1:47.09	
6	Peter Vanderkaay	USA	1:47.25	
7	Emiliano Brembilla	Italy	1:47.63	
8	ZHANG Lin	China	1:49.45	

=== Semifinals ===
Rank	Name	Nationality	Time	Note
1	Michael Phelps	USA	1:46.33	Q
2	Emiliano Brembilla	Italy	1:47.37	Q
3	Nicholas Sprenger	Australia	1:47.57	Q
4	Grant Hackett	Australia	1:47.66	Q
5	Brent Hayden	Canada	1:48.00	Q
6	Ryk Neethling	South Africa	1:48.05	Q
7	ZHANG Lin	China	1:48.10	Q
8	Peter Vanderkaay	USA	1:48.11	Q
9	Filippo Magnini	Italy	1:48.34	
10	Amaury Leveaux	France	1:48.71	
11	Stefan Herbst	Germany	1:48.72	
12	David Carry	Great Britain	1:48.79	
13	Yoshihiro Okumura	Japan	1:49.15	
14	Romāns Miloslavskis	Latvia	1:49.19	
15	Dominik Meichtry	Switzerland	1:49.97	
16	Rick Say	Canada	1:50.01	

=== Prelims ===
Rank	Name	Nationality	Time	Note
1	Grant Hackett	Australia	1:47.88	Q
2	Michael Phelps	USA	1:48.17	Q
3	Ryk Neethling	South Africa	1:48.37	Q
4	Peter Vanderkaay	USA	1:48.53	Q
5	Brent Hayden	Canada	1:48.59	Q
6	Amaury Leveaux	France	1:48.69	Q
7	Emiliano Brembilla	Italy	1:48.70	Q
8	Filippo Magnini	Italy	1:48.78	Q
9	Nicholas Sprenger	Australia	1:48.80	Q
10	Yoshihiro Okumura	Japan	1:48.92	Q
11	Rick Say	Canada	1:48.96	Q
12	David Carry	Great Britain	1:49.09	Q
13	Dominik Meichtry	Switzerland	1:49.13	Q
14	ZHANG Lin	China	1:49.19	Q
15	Stefan Herbst	Germany	1:49.32	Q
16	Romāns Miloslavskis	Latvia	1:49.40	Q
17	Sho Uchida	Japan	1:49.42	
18	Paul Biedermann	Germany	1:49.47	
19	Olaf Wildeboer	Spain	1:49.62	
20	PARK Tae-Hwan	South Korea	1:49.70	
21	Andreas Zisimos	Greece	1:49.75	
22	Shai Livnat	Israel	1:49.81	
23	Květoslav Svoboda	Czech Republic	1:49.85	
24	Jean Basson	South Africa	1:49.99	
25	Maxim Kuznetsov	Russia	1:50.12	
26	Dominik Koll	Austria	1:50.37	
27	Jacob Carstensen	Denmark	1:50.74	
28	Nicolas Rostoucher	France	1:50.76	
29	Evgeny Lagunov	Russia	1:50.94	
30	Adriano Niz	Portugal	1:51.00	
31	Michal Rokicki	Poland	1:51.01	
32	CHEN Zuo	China	1:51.11	
33	Michal Rubáček	Czech Republic	1:51.44	
34	Paulius Andrijauskas	Lithuania	1:51.48	
35	Dmytro Vereitinov	Ukraine	1:51.55	
36	Nabil Kebbab	Algeria	1:51.64	
37	Apostolos Antonopoulos	Greece	1:51.70	
38	Shaune Fraser	Cayman Islands	1:51.91	
39	Mihail Alexandrov	Bulgaria	1:52.11	
39	Tiago Venâncio	Portugal	1:52.11	
41	Gard Kvale	Norway	1:52.44	
42	Mahrez Mebarek	Algeria	1:52.80	
43	Giancarlo Zolezzi	Chile	1:52.96	
44	Thomas Felten	Netherlands	1:52.99	
45	Igor Snitko	Ukraine	1:53.02	
46	Saulius Binevičius	Lithuania	1:53.15	
47	Miguel Molina	Philippines	1:53.18	
48	Luka Turk	Slovenia	1:53.19	
49	Maximiliano Schnettler	Chile	1:53.20	
50	Andrei Radzionov	Belarus	1:53.39	
51	Vitaliy Khan	Kazakhstan	1:54.31	
52	Petr Vasilev	Uzbekistan	1:54.46	
53	Dean Kent	New Zealand	1:54.66	
54	Sebastian Arango Herrera	Colombia	1:54.92	
55	Yahor Salabutov	Belarus	1:54.96	
56	Timur Irgashev	Uzbekistan	1:54.98	
57	Bryan Tay	Singapore	1:55.01	
58	Antonio Hernández	Cuba	1:55.11	
59	Ronald Cowen	Bermuda	1:55.53	
60	Ki-Hyuk Sim	South Korea	1:55.54	
61	Muhammad Akbar Nasution	Indonesia	1:55.73	
62	Jonas Persson	Sweden	1:55.95	
63	Sebastian Stoss	Austria	1:56.19	
64	Jason Dunford	Kenya	1:56.91	
65	Evan Marcus	Guatemala	1:56.96	
66	Matias Rementeria Perez	Uruguay	1:57.36	
67	Jeffrey Su	Singapore	1:57.49	
68	Kuo-Chuan Tsai	Chinese Taipei	1:57.99	
69	Sheng-Chieh Tang	Chinese Taipei	1:58.00	
70	James Walsh	Philippines	1:58.23	
71	Mikayel Koloyan	Armenia	1:58.26	
72	Kieran Locke	(United States Virgin Islands) Virgin Islands	1:58.39	
73	Emanuele Nicolini	San Marino	1:58.44	
74	Youssef Hafdi	Morocco	1:58.63	
75	Brad Hamilton	Jamaica	1:58.72	
76	Soheil Ashtiani	Iran	1:59.01	
77	Waleed Al-Qahtani	Kuwait	1:59.24	
78	Zurab Khomasuridze	Georgia	1:59.36	
79	Vasilii Danilov	Kyrgyzstan	1:59.77	
80	Andy Wibowo	Indonesia	2:00.15	
81	Morgan Locke	(United States Virgin Islands) Virgin Islands	2:00.32	
82	Jose Lobo	Paraguay	2:01.03	
83	Aleksandr Moseshvili	Georgia	2:01.23	
84	Anas Hamadeh	Jordan	2:01.63	
85	Sean Dehere	Barbados	2:01.67	
86	Nguyen Thanh Hai	Vietnam	2:01.98	
87	Steven Mangroo	Seychelles	2:02.38	
88	Bradford Worrell	Saint Lucia	2:03.81	
89	Kuan Fong Lao	Macao	2:04.21	
90	Fernando Medrano	Nicaragua	2:04.70	
91	Erik Rajohnson	Madagascar	2:05.95	
92	Miguel Navarro	Bolivia	2:06.37	
93	Loai Tashkandi	Saudi Arabia	2:07.53	
94	Hassan Shah	Maldives	2:35.51	
--	Milinda Wickramasinghe	Sri Lanka	DNS	

== See also ==
- Swimming at the 2003 World Aquatics Championships – Men's 200 metre freestyle
- Swimming at the 2004 Summer Olympics – Men's 200 metre freestyle
- Swimming at the 2007 World Aquatics Championships – Men's 200 metre freestyle
