= Swimming at the 2003 World Aquatics Championships – Men's 200 metre freestyle =

Men's 200m Freestyle at the 2003 FINA World Aquatics Championships
- Dates: 21 July (prelims, semifinals); 22 July (final)
- Winning time: 1 minute 45.14 seconds

Medalists
gold medal	Ian Thorpe	Australia
silver medal	Pieter v. d. Hoogenband	Netherlands
bronze medal	Grant Hackett	Australia

The Men's 200 Freestyle event at the 10th FINA World Aquatics Championships swam on 21–22 July 2003 in Barcelona, Spain. Preliminary and Semifinal heats were on 21 July, while the Final swam on 22 July.

Prior to the start of the event, the existing World (WR) and Championship (CR) records were both:

- WR and CR: 1:44.06 swum by Ian Thorpe (Australia) on 25 July 2001 in Fukuoka, Japan

== Results ==
=== Final ===
Place	Swimmer	Nation	Time	Notes
1	Ian Thorpe	Australia	1:45.14	
2	Pieter van den Hoogenband	Netherlands	1:46.43	
3	Grant Hackett	Australia	1:46.85	
4	Květoslav Svoboda	Czech Republic	1:48.73	
5	Andrei Kapralov	Russia	1:48.76	
6	Federico Cappellazzo	Italy	1:48.79	
7	Peter Mankoč	Slovenia	1:48.96	
8	Nate Dusing	United States	1:49.35	

=== Semifinals ===
Rank	Heat + Lane	Swimmer	Nation	Time	Notes
1	S2 L4	Pieter van den Hoogenband	Netherlands	1:46.32	q
2	S1 L4	Ian Thorpe	Australia	1:47.20	q
3	S2 L6	Grant Hackett	Australia	1:47.72	q
4	S2 L3	Nate Dusing	USA	1:48.66	q
5	S2 L8	Andrei Kapralov	Russia	1:48.84	q
6	S1 L8	Peter Mankoč	Slovenia	1:48.92	q
7	S2 L5	Květoslav Svoboda	Czech Republic	1:49.23	q
8	S1 L7	Federico Cappellazzo	Italy	1:49.23	q
9	S1 L6	Rick Say	Canada	1:49.52	
10	S1 L3	George Bovell	Trinidad and Tobago	1:49.64	
11	S1 L5	Stefan Herbst	Germany	1:49.76	
12	S2 L7	Olaf Wildeboer	Spain	1:49.85	
13	S1 L1	Maxim Kuznetsov	Russia	1:49.98	
14	S2 L1	Dominik Meichtry	Switzerland	1:50.59	
15	S1 L2	Romāns Miloslavskis	Latvia	1:50.66	
16	S2 L2	Klete Keller	USA	1:51.69	

=== Preliminaries ===
Rank	Heat+Lane	Swimmer	Nation	Time	Notes
1	H12 L4	Pieter van den Hoogenband	Netherlands	1:47.21	q
2	H13 L4	Ian Thorpe	Australia	1:47.99	q
3	H12 L3	Květoslav Svoboda	Czech Republic	1:49.30	q
4	H12 L6	Stefan Herbst	Germany	1:49.47	q
5	H12 L5	Nate Dusing	United States	1:49.49	q
6	H08 L4	George Bovell	Trinidad and Tobago	1:49.51	q
7	H11 L4	Grant Hackett	Australia	1:49.66	q
8	H13 L3	Rick Say	Canada	1:49.75	q
9	H11 L5	Klete Keller	United States	1:49.77	q
10	H10 L5	Romāns Miloslavskis	Latvia	1:50.05	q
11	H13 L2	Olaf Wildeboer	Spain	1:50.06	q
12	H11 L3	Federico Cappellazzo	Italy	1:50.19	q
13	H10 L8	Dominik Meichtry	Switzerland	1:50.29	q
14	H12 L7	Maxim Kuznetsov	Russia	1:50.48	q
15	H11 L7	Andrei Kapralov	Russia	1:50.53	q
15	H11 L8	Peter Mankoč	Slovenia	1:50.53	q
17	H12 L8	Kyu Chul Han	South Korea	1:50.54	
18	H10 L4	Nikolaos Xylouris	Greece	1:50.61	
18	H11 L1	Rodrigo Castro	Brazil	1:50.61	
20	H11 L2	Zuo Chen	China	1:50.62	
21	H12 L2	Yu Liu	China	1:50.74	
22	H13 L6	Mark Johnston	Canada	1:50.77	
23	H13 L8	Dragoș Coman	Romania	1:50.90	
24	H09 L3	Sergiy Fesenko	Ukraine	1:51.00	
25	H13 L7	Lars Conrad	Germany	1:51.02	
26	H09 L6	Saulius Binevičius	Lithuania	1:51.12	
27	H10 L1	Shunichi Fujita	Japan	1:51.36	
28	H09 L5	Shai Livnat	Israel	1:51.44	
29	H12 L1	Daisuke Hosokawa	Japan	1:51.52	
30	H11 L6	Athanasios Oikonomou	Greece	1:51.55	
31	H13 L1	Tamás Kerékjártó	Hungary	1:51.63	
32	H09 L4	Cezar Bădiță	Romania	1:52.37	
33	H10 L7	Rafael Mósca	Brazil	1:52.93	
34	H09 L8	Gian Carlo Zolezzi	Chile	1:53.26	
35	H09 L1	Miguel Molina	Philippines	1:53.76	
36	H08 L5	Victor Rogut	Moldova	1:53.78	
37	H08 L6	Alexandros Aresti	Cyprus	1:54.09	
38	H10 L3	Aytekin Mindan	Turkey	1:54.28	
39	H07 L1	Danil Haustov	Estonia	1:54.61	
40	H10 L6	Luis Monteiro	Portugal	1:54.70	
41	H07 L6	Mihail Alexandrov	Bulgaria	1:54.75	
42	H07 L7	Adil Bellaz	Morocco	1:54.88	
43	H08 L2	Petr Vasilev	Uzbekistan	1:54.94	
44	H05 L1	Ken Tomson	Estonia	1:55.06	
45	H07 L5	Igor Erhartic	FR Yugoslavia	1:55.07	
46	H06 L6	Vyacheslav Titarenko	Kazakhstan	1:55.34	
46	H08 L1	Erwin Maldonado	Venezuela	1:55.34	
48	H08 L8	Max Schnettler	Chile	1:55.51	
49	H06 L3	Albert Subirats	Venezuela	1:55.56	
50	H06 L4	Ronald Cowen	Bermuda	1:55.57	
51	H09 L7	Shilo Ayalon	Israel	1:55.61	
52	H06 L1	Igor Čerenšek	Croatia	1:55.66	
53	H05 L4	Tuck Kar Wong	Malaysia	1:56.10	
54	H05 L7	Carl Probert	Fiji	1:56.37	
55	H06 L5	Jonas Tilly	Sweden	1:56.97	
56	H07 L2	Ivan Grougnet	Andorra	1:57.42	
57	H08 L7	Anovar Bennaceur	Tunisia	1:57.53	
58	H07 L3	Andrei Zaharov	Moldova	1:57.73	
59	H05 L2	Zurab Khomasuridze	Georgia	1:57.78	
60	H06 L8	Emanuele Nicolini	San Marino	1:57.87	
61	H05 L3	Sergey Tsoy	Uzbekistan	1:58.05	
62	H07 L4	Cem Pasaoglu	Turkey	1:58.17	
63	H07 L8	William Muriel	Ecuador	1:58.21	
64	H05 L8	David Cartin	Costa Rica	1:58.38	
65	H05 L5	Dániel Gyurta	Hungary	1:58.58	
66	H05 L6	Carlos Melendez	El Salvador	1:58.68	
67	H04 L1	Youssef Hafdi	Morocco	1:58.94	
68	H06 L7	Mohammad Naeem Masri	Syria	1:59.18	
69	H04 L3	Kunakorn Yimsomruay	Thailand	1:59.25	
70	H06 L2	Mikayel Koloyan	Armenia	2:00.64	
71	H03 L5	Babak Farhoudi	Iran	2:01.25	
72	H02 L5	Sean Dehere	Barbados	2:02.07	
73	H03 L3	Davy Bisslik	Aruba	2:02.23	
74	H04 L2	Kenny Roberts	Seychelles	2:02.70	
75	H04 L4	Obied Ahmed Al Jassimi	United Arab Emirates	2:03.15	
76	H04 L8	Benjamin Wells	Papua New Guinea	2:03.23	
77	H03 L8	Bradford Worrell	Saint Lucia	2:03.55	
78	H03 L6	Fernando Medrano	Nicaragua	2:03.84	
79	H03 L2	Yann Lausan	Tahiti	2:04.92	
80	H03 L7	Dean Palacios	Northern Mariana Islands	2:05.04	
81	H04 L5	Maher Al-Moatar	Saudi Arabia	2:05.73	
82	H03 L1	Mumtaz Ahmed	Pakistan	2:06.01	
83	H03 L4	Sergey Dyachkov	Azerbaijan	2:06.42	
84	H04 L7	Vasilii Danilov	Kyrgyzstan	2:06.47	
85	H04 L6	Barnsley Albert	Seychelles	2:06.82	
86	H09 L2	Serhiy Advena	Ukraine	2:07.61	
87	H02 L4	Neil Agius	Malta	2:07.68	
88	H02 L3	Patrick Boustany	Lebanon	2:08.23	
89	H02 L1	Connor Keith	Guam	2:10.62	
90	H02 L7	Kin-Vincent Duenas	Guam	2:10.92	
91	H02 L2	Clark Randrianandraina	Madagascar	2:12.14	
92	H01 L5	Peter James Linch	Zambia	2:14.84	
93	H01 L3	Chisela Kanchela	Zambia	2:16.43	
94	H01 L4	Kreshnik Gjata	Albania	2:16.76	
-	-	Loren Lindborg	Marshall Islands	DQ	
-	-	Aldi Gugushka	Albania	DQ	
-	-	Emiliano Brembilla	Italy	DNS	
-	-	Oussama Mellouli	Tunisia	DNS	
