= Swimming at the 2005 World Aquatics Championships – Men's 100 metre freestyle =

Men's 100 metre freestyle at the 2005 FINA World Championships
- Dates: 27 July 2005 (heats, semifinals); 28 July 2005 (final)
- Competitors: 131 from 91 nations
- Winning time: 48.12 seconds

Medalists
gold medal	Filippo Magnini	Italy
silver medal	Roland Schoeman	South Africa
bronze medal	Ryk Neethling	South Africa

The men's 100 metre freestyle at the 2005 World Aquatics Championships occurred on 27 July (heats and semifinals) and in the evening of 28 July (final) in the Olympic pool at Parc Jean-Drapeau in Montreal, Canada. 131 swimmers were entered in the event, of which 124 swam in one of 17 preliminary heats. The top-16 swimmers from the heats advanced on to semifinals; the top-8 swimmers in the two semifinals heats advanced onto the next night's final.

The existing records at the start of the event were:

- World record (WR): 47.84, Pieter van den Hoogenband (Netherlands), September 19, 2000 in Sydney, Australia.
- Championship record (CR): 48.33, Anthony Ervin (USA), Fukuoka 2001 (Jul.27.2001)

== Results ==
=== Final ===
Place	Name	Nationality	Time	Note
1	Filippo Magnini	Italy	48.12	CR
2	Roland Schoeman	South Africa	48.28	
3	Ryk Neethling	South Africa	48.34	
4	Jason Lezak	USA	48.74	
5	Duje Draganja	Croatia	48.89	
6	Brent Hayden	Canada	48.92	
7	Michael Phelps	USA	48.99	
8	Amaury Leveaux	France	49.55	

=== Semifinals ===
Rank	Name	Nationality	Time	Note
1	Roland Schoeman	South Africa	48.45	Q
2	Ryk Neethling	South Africa	48.54	Q
3	Filippo Magnini	Italy	48.73	Q
4	Duje Draganja	Croatia	48.88	Q
5	Michael Phelps	USA	48.93	Q
6	Jason Lezak	USA	49.03	Q
7	Brent Hayden	Canada	49.05	Q
8	Amaury Leveaux	France	49.19	Q
9	Frédérick Bousquet	France	49.21	
10	Lukasz Gasior	Poland	49.31	
11	Michael Klim	Australia	49.32	
12	Stefan Nystrand	Sweden	49.41	
13	Salim Iles	Algeria	49.51	
14	Andrey Kapralov	Russia	49.53	
15	Peter Mankoč	Slovenia	50.90	
16	Rolandas Gimbutis	Lithuania	50.42	

=== Preliminaries ===
Rank	Swimmer	Nation	Time	Note
1	Filippo Magnini	Italy	48.97	Q
2	Ryk Neethling	South Africa	49.04	Q
3	Michael Phelps	United States	49.23	Q
3	Roland Schoeman	South Africa	49.23	Q
5	Salim Iles	Algeria	49.28	Q
6	Brent Hayden	Canada	49.29	Q
7	Duje Draganja	Croatia	49.31	Q
7	Łukasz Gąsior	Poland	49.31	Q
9	Jason Lezak	United States	49.34	Q
10	Frédérick Bousquet	France	49.38	Q
11	Andrei Kapralov	Russia	49.46	Q
12	Peter Mankoč	Slovenia	49.59	Q
13	Amaury Leveaux	France	49.60	Q
14	Stefan Nystrand	Sweden	49.64	Q
15	Michael Klim	Australia	49.71	Q
16	Rolandas Gimbutis	Lithuania	49.73	Q
17	Evgeny Lagunov	Russia	49.88	
18	Yuri Yegoshin	Ukraine	49.89	
19	Denys Syzonenko	Ukraine	49.97	
20	Andrew Mewing	Australia	49.99	
21	Nabil Kebbab	Algeria	50.01	
22	Daisuke Hosokawa	Japan	50.07	
23	Jens Schreiber	Germany	50.08	
24	Zuo Chen	China	50.20	
25	Matti Rajakylä	Finland	50.21	
26	Hisayoshi Sato	Japan	50.23	
27	Leif-Marten Kruger	Germany	50.24	
28	Stanislav Neviarovski	Belarus	50.32	
29	Mitja Zastrow	Netherlands	50.45	
30	Örn Arnarson	Iceland	50.47	
31	Romāns Miloslavskis	Latvia	50.51	
32	Saulius Binevičius	Lithuania	50.59	
33	Tiago Venâncio	Portugal	50.60	
34	Jernej Godec	Slovenia	50.69	
35	Matias Aguilera	Argentina	50.71	
36	Dominik Koll	Austria	50.77	
37	Jakob Andkjær	Denmark	50.88	
37	Apostolos Antonopoulos	Greece	50.88	
39	Petter Stymne	Sweden	51.04	
40	Cameron Gibson	New Zealand	51.06	
41	Yahor Salabutov	Belarus	51.08	
42	Rick Say	Canada	51.20	
43	Maximilian Schnettler	Chile	51.47	NR
44	Ryan Pini	Papua New Guinea	51.66	
45	Antonio Hernandez	Cuba	51.67	
46	Ravil Nachaev	Uzbekistan	51.75	
47	Kunliang Zheng	China	51.79	
48	Jose Mafio	Uruguay	51.82	
49	Vitaliy Khan	Kazakhstan	51.87	
50	Shai Livnat	Israel	52.06	
51	Jacinto Ayala	Dominican Republic	52.21	
52	Terrence Haynes	Barbados	52.56	
53	Carl Probert	Fiji	52.34	
53	Corney Swanepoel	New Zealand	52.34	
55	Alexandr Sklyar	Kazakhstan	52.42	
56	Bryan Tay	Singapore	52.60	
57	Jason Dunford	Kenya	52.72	
58	Ki Hyuk Sim	South Korea	52.74	
59	Mohamed Madwa	Kuwait	52.82	
60	Mark Chay	Singapore	52.88	
61	Matias Rementeria Perez	Uruguay	52.95	
62	Joshua Laban	Virgin Islands	53.03	
63	Sebastian Arango Herrera	Colombia	53.18	
64	Suriya Suksuphak	Thailand	53.27	
64	Petr Vasilev	Uzbekistan	53.27	
66	Stepan Pinciuc	Moldova	53.44	
67	Wing Cheun Wong	Macau	53.49	
68	Brad Hamilton	Jamaica	53.50	
69	Basil Kaaki	Libya	53.56	
70	Shawn Clarke	Barbados	53.63	
71	Carlos Castro	Chile	53.75	
72	Akbar M. Nasution	Indonesia	53.84	
73	Ronald Cowan	Bermuda	53.85	
74	Kieran Locke	Virgin Islands	53.88	
75	Rodrigo Diaz	Guatemala	53.92	
76	Kuan Fong Lao	Macau	53.93	
77	Andy Wibowo	Indonesia	53.96	
78	Gregory Arkhurst	Ivory Coast	53.99	
79	Jose Lobo	Paraguay	54.02	
80	Francisco Montenegro	Guatemala	54.28	
81	Mikayel Koloyan	Armenia	54.30	
82	Waleed Al-Qahtani	Kuwait	54.56	
83	Vorrawuti Aumpiwan	Thailand	54.57	
84	David Dunford	Kenya	54.77	
85	Aleksandr Moseshvili	Georgia	54.86	
86	Nguyen Thanh Hai	Vietnam	54.87	
87	Alexander Ray	Namibia	54.95	
87	Bradford Worrell	Saint Lucia	54.95	
89	Soheil Ashtiani	Iran	55.00	
90	Emile-Rony Bakale	Republic of the Congo	55.04	
91	Anas Hamadeh	Jordan	55.42	
91	Emanuele Nicolini	San Marino	55.42	
93	Horacio Carcamo	Honduras	55.53	
94	Julio Rivera	Honduras	55.84	
95	Yan Lin Aung	Myanmar	55.86	
96	Marc Dansou	Benin	56.09	
97	Tunui Cowan	Tahiti	56.15	
98	Connor H Keith	Guam	56.19	
99	Miguel Navarro	Bolivia	56.28	
100	Madicke Mbengue	Senegal	56.31	
101	Milinda Wickramasinghe	Sri Lanka	56.79	
102	Andrei Tamir	Mongolia	56.82	
103	Marcelo Alba	Bolivia	56.86	
104	Fernando Medrano	Nicaragua	57.01	
105	Steven Mangroo	Seychelles	57.09	
106	Bader Almuhana	Saudi Arabia	57.21	
107	Tamatoa Ellacott	Tahiti	57.45	
108	Romulo Pereira	Angola	57.57	
109	Andrey Molchanov	Turkmenistan	57.63	
110	Loai Tashkandi	Saudi Arabia	57.66	
111	Pape Madiop Ndong	Senegal	58.07	
112	Orkhan Samadov	Azerbaijan	58.10	
113	Earlando McRae	Guyana	58.24	
114	Alain Brigion-Tobe	Cameroon	58.31	
115	Remigio Chilanle	Mozambique	1:00.01	
116	Bayaredene Soninerdene	Mongolia	1:00.44	
117	Ian Taylor	Marshall Islands	1:00.71	
118	Kerson Hadley	Federated States of Micronesia	1:01.19	
119	Joshua Marfleet	Samoa	1:02.45	
120	Issam Halawani	Palestine	1:02.75	
121	Michael Taylor	Marshall Islands	1:04.22	
122	Tony D. Augustine	Federated States of Micronesia	1:04.71	
123	Hassan Shah	Maldives	1:09.46	
-	Lorenzo Vismara	Italy	DQ	
-	Neil Agius	Malta	DNS	
-	Islam Kazi Monirul	Bangladesh	DNS	
-	Leonel Matonse	Mozambique	DNS	
-	Maran Cruz	Puerto Rico	DNS	
-	Dominik Meichtry	Switzerland	DNS	
-	Aristeidis Grigoraidis	Greece	DNS	
-	Milorad Čavić	Serbia and Montenegro	DNS	

== See also ==
- Swimming at the 2003 World Aquatics Championships – Men's 100 metre freestyle
- Swimming at the 2004 Summer Olympics – Men's 100 metre freestyle
- Swimming at the 2007 World Aquatics Championships – Men's 100 metre freestyle
