= Swimming at the 2007 World Aquatics Championships – Men's 200 metre freestyle =

Men's 200 metre freestyle at the 2007 FINA World Championships
- Venue: Rod Laver Arena
- Dates: 26 March 2007 (heats, semifinals); 27 March 2007 (final)
- Competitors: 118
- Winning time: 1:43.86 WR

Medalists
gold medal	Michael Phelps	United States
silver medal	Pieter v.d. Hoogenband	Netherlands
bronze medal	Park Tae-Hwan	South Korea

The men's 200 metre freestyle event was the 10th event contested on the 2007 World Aquatics Championship for Swimming.

The 15 heats began at 10:27, on 26 March 2007, at the Rod Laver Arena, in Melbourne Park.

The semifinals started on the evening of the same day at 20:17.

The final started at 19:00 on the following day, 27 March.

== Records ==
World record
1:44.06	Ian Thorpe	Australia	Fukuoka (Japan)	July 25, 2001
Competition record
1:44.06	Ian Thorpe	Australia	Fukuoka (Japan)	July 25, 2001

== Heats ==
Rank	Heat	Lane	Name	Nationality	50m	100m	150m	Time	Q
1	14	4	Pieter van den Hoogenband	Netherlands	25.20	51.91	1:19.56	1:47.36	Q
2	15	4	Michael Phelps	USA	25.39	53.02	1:20.82	1:47.52	Q
3	14	5	Park Tae-hwan	South Korea	25.56	52.94	1:20.73	1:47.58	Q
4	14	2	Kenrick Monk	Australia	25.53	52.90	1:20.47	1:48.00	Q
5	14	1	Nicola Cassio	Italy	25.75	53.47	1:21.00	1:48.32	Q
6	14	6	Amaury Leveaux	France	25.48	53.29	1:21.02	1:48.35	Q
7	15	7	Dominik Meichtry	Switzerland	25.41	52.96	1:20.48	1:48.49	Q
8	14	3	Brent Hayden	Canada	25.18	52.49	1:20.53	1:48.62	Q
9	15	5	Massimiliano Rosolino	Italy	25.29	52.62	1:20.48	1:48.63	Q
10	13	7	Brian Johns	Canada	25.49	53.31	1:21.28	1:48.72	Q
11	15	6	Paul Biedermann	Germany	25.56	53.19	1:20.97	1:48.84	Q
12	13	3	Zhang Lin	China	26.58	54.47	1:22.19	1:48.88	Q
13	15	1	Patrick Murphy	Australia	25.83	53.37	1:21.29	1:49.01	Q
14	15	3	David Carry	Great Britain	25.65	53.41	1:21.26	1:49.15	Q
15	13	2	Dominik Koll	Austria	26.41	54.07	1:22.04	1:49.20	Q
16	12	2	László Cseh	Hungary	25.85	53.56	1:21.78	1:49.47	Q
17	12	5	Nicolas Oliveira	Brazil	25.53	53.89	1:22.02	1:49.55	
18	13	4	Klete Keller	USA	26.27	54.26	1:22.36	1:49.58	
19	13	1	Fabien Gilot	France	26.14	53.83	1:21.73	1:49.59	
20	12	8	Tiago Venâncio	Portugal	25.44	53.93	1:21.74	1:49.63	
21	11	4	David Brandl	Austria	25.82	53.21	1:21.35	1:49.68	
22	11	3	Daisuke Hosokawa	Japan	25.40	53.27	1:21.53	1:49.79	
23	14	7	Jean Basson	South Africa	25.90	53.43	1:21.36	1:49.82	
24	15	8	Nikolaos Xylouris	Greece	25.82	53.55	1:21.72	1:50.04	
25	13	5	Simon Burnett	Great Britain	25.71	54.03	1:22.55	1:50.11	
26	10	4	Michał Rokicki	Poland	26.42	54.33	1:22.33	1:50.12	
27	15	2	Stefan Herbst	Germany	25.67	53.71	1:22.04	1:50.25	
28	10	1	Luka Turk	Slovenia	26.54	54.63	1:22.66	1:50.36	
29	12	3	Zhang Enjian	China	26.24	53.97	1:22.01	1:50.45	
30	13	6	Andreas Zisimos	Greece	25.80	53.99	1:22.05	1:50.48	
31	12	6	Květoslav Svoboda	Czech Republic	25.78	53.90	1:22.35	1:50.50	
32	13	8	Andrey Kapralov	Russia	25.18	52.90	1:21.71	1:50.55	
33	11	5	Shai Livnat	Israel	25.20	52.55	1:20.79	1:50.60	
34	14	8	Olaf Wildeboer	Netherlands	25.90	54.17	1:22.43	1:50.72	
35	12	1	Sergey Perunin	Russia	25.91	54.19	1:22.48	1:50.78	
36	12	7	Rodrigo Castro	Brazil	25.99	53.81	1:22.08	1:50.79	
37	10	6	Andrew McMillan	New Zealand	26.40	54.55	1:22.85	1:51.10	
38	10	3	Christoffer Vikström	Sweden	25.93	53.34	1:21.85	1:51.25	
39	11	1	Michal Rubáček	Czech Republic	25.75	53.89	1:22.79	1:51.31	
40	11	6	Takamitsu Kojima	Japan	25.65	54.24	1:23.04	1:51.32	
41	10	7	Michael Jack	New Zealand	26.37	54.42	1:23.14	1:51.45	
42	11	8	Glenn Surgeloose	Belgium	25.70	54.33	1:22.98	1:51.66	
43	11	7	Lukasz Giminski	Poland	26.03	54.37	1:23.20	1:51.72	
44	9	6	Gard Kvale	Norway	26.31	54.31	1:23.10	1:51.78	
45	7	1	Oleksandr Tsepukh	Ukraine	24.95	53.37	1:22.66	1:51.83	
46	9	4	Nabil Kebbab	Algeria	26.46	54.93	1:23.51	1:51.95	
47	1	6	Saulius Binevičius	Lithuania	26.04	53.98	1:22.82	1:52.22	
48	9	7	Dominik Straga	Croatia	25.92	54.11	1:22.77	1:52.40	
49	8	6	Virdhawal Khade	India	26.38	54.75	1:23.67	1:52.41	
50	11	2	Romāns Miloslavskis	Latvia	25.74	53.62	1:22.12	1:52.44	
51	10	5	Adriano Niz	Portugal	26.29	55.01	1:24.12	1:52.46	
52	9	1	Martín Kutscher	Uruguay	25.95	54.38	1:23.56	1:52.57	
53	9	8	Miguel Molina	Philippines	26.70	55.04	1:23.71	1:52.67	
54	9	3	Crox Acuña	Venezuela	25.73	54.63	1:23.47	1:52.70	
55	10	2	Namgyun Lim	South Korea	26.57	54.91	1:23.75	1:53.01	
56	8	1	Jason Dunford	Kenya	25.14	53.38	1:22.80	1:53.09	
57	7	5	Ahmed Mathlouthi	Tunisia	25.85	54.69	1:23.79	1:53.27	
58	9	5	Daniel Bego	Malaysia	26.86	55.84	1:25.14	1:53.32	
59	8	3	Vitaliy Khan	Kazakhstan	26.03	54.12	1:22.51	1:53.37	
60	9	2	Giancarlo Zolezzi Seoane	Chile	26.48	55.15	1:24.30	1:53.90	
61	8	7	Alexandre Bakhtiarov	Cyprus	26.15	55.41	1:25.11	1:54.25	
62	8	2	Mario Montoya	Costa Rica	25.81	54.97	1:24.98	1:54.70	
63	8	5	Salvador Mallat Arcaya	Chile	26.88	55.86	1:25.23	1:54.71	
64	7	3	Igor Čerenšek	Croatia	26.76	56.16	1:26.77	1:55.04	
65	10	8	Zhirong Bryan Tay	Singapore	27.28	56.66	1:26.89	1:55.70	
66	8	4	Mikael Koloyan	Armenia	26.13	54.96	1:24.79	1:55.99	
67	7	2	Timur Irgashev	Uzbekistan	26.76	56.52	1:26.78	1:56.39	
68	5	2	Emanuele Nicolini	San Marino	27.29	57.13	1:26.83	1:56.61	
69	6	6	Kevin Soow Choy Yeap	Malaysia	27.43	57.44	1:28.25	1:56.65	
70	6	3	Mohammad Bidarian	Iran	26.78	56.17	1:26.90	1:56.68	
71	7	7	Vyacheslav Titarenko	Kazakhstan	27.18	57.07	1:27.19	1:56.74	
72	6	4	Kieran Locke	(United States Virgin Islands) Virgin Islands	27.27	56.54	1:26.70	1:57.03	
73	7	4	Vasilii Danilov	Kyrgyzstan	26.60	55.63	1:25.35	1:57.38	
74	6	8	Youssef Hafdi	Morocco	27.51	57.52	1:27.41	1:58.10	
75	6	5	Ju Wei Sng	Singapore	28.24	58.38	1:28.21	1:58.29	
76	4	8	Diego Castillo Granados	Panama	27.45	57.66	1:28.56	1:58.64	
77	5	5	Ibrahim Nazarov	Uzbekistan	26.53	55.86	1:26.51	1:58.76	
78	5	6	Wing Cheung Victor Wong	Macau	27.44	58.04	1:28.38	1:58.88	
79	4	2	Christopher Duenas	Guam	27.78	57.51	1:28.46	1:58.99	
80	6	2	Sebastián Jahnsen	Peru	27.41	57.68	1:28.62	1:59.04	
81	8	8	Oscar Jahnsen	Peru	26.88	56.95	1:28.51	1:59.22	
82	6	1	Albert Cristiadi Sutanto	Indonesia	28.11	58.51	1:29.20	1:59.32	
83	4	6	Morgan Locke	(United States Virgin Islands) Virgin Islands	28.07	58.50	1:28.68	1:59.42	
84	6	7	Srdjan Vujasin	Bosnia and Herzegovina	27.13	56.78	1:27.65	1:59.44	
85	7	8	Waleed Al-Qahtani	Kuwait	28.02	58.15	1:28.81	1:59.70	
86	5	8	Pál Joensen	Faroe Islands	27.24	57.18	1:28.29	1:59.82	
87	4	5	Brian Howard Ho	Indonesia	27.54	57.73	1:29.04	2:00.09	
88	4	7	Fernando Medrano Medina	Nicaragua	28.08	58.47	1:29.12	2:00.48	
89	5	3	Amar Muralidharan	India	27.44	57.43	1:28.83	2:00.66	
90	5	1	Steven Mangroo	Seychelles	27.81	58.43	1:29.57	2:00.76	
91	4	3	Colin Bensadon	Gibraltar	27.49	57.75	1:29.01	2:01.20	
92	5	4	Anas Abuyousuf	Qatar	27.70	58.21	1:29.69	2:01.40	
93	3	4	Loai Tashkandi	Saudi Arabia	28.20	59.97	1:30.57	2:01.49	
94	3	5	Heshan Unamboowe	Sri Lanka	28.08	59.70	1:31.22	2:02.85	
95	3	3	Neil Agius	Malta	28.40	59.64	1:31.21	2:03.21	
96	3	2	Marcelo Alba	Bolivia	28.07	59.53	1:32.04	2:03.31	
97	3	6	Heimanu Sichan	Tahiti	28.01	59.68	1:32.24	2:03.65	
98	4	1	Daniel Lee	Sri Lanka	27.92	58.77	1:31.17	2:03.76	
99	7	6	Emile−Rony Bakale	Congo	26.19	56.00	1:29.06	2:03.82	
100	4	4	Anas Hamadeh	Jordan	27.37	58.21	1:31.38	2:05.37	
101	2	1	Eros Qama	Albania	28.06	59.71	1:32.62	2:05.80	
102	3	7	Oliver Quick	Gibraltar	28.80	1:00.51	1:33.34	2:05.95	
103	5	7	Rashid Iunusov	Kyrgyzstan	27.79	58.74	1:32.50	2:06.59	
104	2	3	Carlos Shimizu	Guam	28.77	1:00.56	1:33.42	2:06.81	
105	1	5	Otiko Kpliboh	Nigeria	27.98	59.61	1:32.78	2:07.28	
106	3	1	Malbor Oshafi	Albania	27.96	1:00.12	1:33.80	2:07.51	
107	3	8	Zane Jordan	Zambia	28.32	1:00.36	1:34.05	2:09.74	
108	2	5	Yannick Roberts	Guyana	29.31	1:02.79	1:36.91	2:10.75	
109	2	4	Eli Ebenezer Wong	Northern Mariana Islands	29.62	1:03.94	1:38.95	2:12.32	
110	2	6	Jamaal Sobers	Guyana	29.50	1:03.95	1:41.04	2:16.87	
111	1	7	Seraj Mouloud	Libya	28.95	1:02.56	1:40.36	2:18.73	
112	2	7	Sergey Krovyakov	Turkmenistan	29.20	1:03.94	1:40.48	2:19.06	
113	2	2	Cooper Theodore Graf	Northern Mariana Islands	32.78	1:09.61	1:46.31	2:22.69	
114	1	4	Isao Misech	Palau	30.36	1:06.07	1:46.16	2:28.81	
115	2	8	Ibrahim Shameel	Maldives	31.91	1:09.98	1:51.67	2:32.36	
116	1	3	Okai Opanka Adu	Ghana	33.19	1:14.79	2:00.78	2:48.43	
117	1	2	Bernard Blewudzi	Ghana	34.17	1:15.45	2:01.44	2:51.98	
	12	4	Ryk Neethling	South Africa	DNS				

== Semifinals ==
Rank	Heat	Lane	Name	Nationality	50m	100m	150m	Time	Q
1	2	4	Pieter van den Hoogenband	Netherlands	24.52	51.16	1:18.66	1:46.33	Q
2	1	4	Michael Phelps	United States	25.29	52.48	1:20.10	1:46.75	Q
3	2	2	Massimiliano Rosolino	Italy	24.96	52.13	1:19.48	1:47.44	Q
4	1	5	Kenrick Monk	Australia	25.38	52.96	1:20.64	1:47.45	Q
5	2	5	Park Tae-Hwan	South Korea	25.47	52.91	1:20.58	1:47.83	Q
6	1	7	Zhang Lin	China	25.61	53.25	1:21.26	1:48.29	Q
7	2	7	Paul Biedermann	Germany	25.82	53.28	1:20.97	1:48.43	Q
8	2	3	Nicola Cassio	Italy	25.65	53.24	1:20.83	1:48.47	Q
9	2	8	Dominik Koll	Austria	25.28	52.66	1:20.50	1:48.50	
10	1	2	Brian Johns	Canada	25.47	53.28	1:21.22	1:48.51	
11	2	6	Dominik Meichtry	Switzerland	25.57	52.87	1:20.48	1:48.54	
12	1	1	David Carry	Great Britain	25.41	52.87	1:20.94	1:48.71	
13	2	1	Patrick Murphy	Australia	25.54	52.92	1:20.89	1:48.75	
14	1	3	Amaury Leveaux	France	25.34	53.28	1:21.45	1:48.81	
15	1	8	László Cseh	Hungary	25.18	52.92	1:20.95	1:48.89	
16	1	6	Brent Hayden	Canada	25.43	53.03	1:20.99	1:48.92	

== Final ==
Rank	Lane	Name	Nationality	50m	100m	150m	Time
1st place, gold medalist(s)	5	Michael Phelps	United States	24.47	51.00	1:17.73	1:43.86 WR
2nd place, silver medalist(s)	4	Pieter van den Hoogenband	Netherlands	24.53	51.17	1:18.16	1:46.28
3rd place, bronze medalist(s)	2	Park Tae-hwan	South Korea	25.41	52.74	1:19.51	1:46.73
4	6	Kenrick Monk	Australia	25.09	52.52	1:19.88	1:47.12
5	3	Massimiliano Rosolino	Italy	25.03	52.02	1:19.15	1:47.18
6	7	Zhang Lin	China	25.46	53.22	1:20.89	1:47.53
7	1	Paul Biedermann	Germany	25.86	53.17	1:20.60	1:48.09
8	8	Nicola Cassio	Italy	25.67	53.37	1:21.00	1:49.13
