= Swimming at the 2004 Summer Olympics – Men's 200 metre freestyle =

Men's 200 metre freestyle at the Games of the XXVIII Olympiad
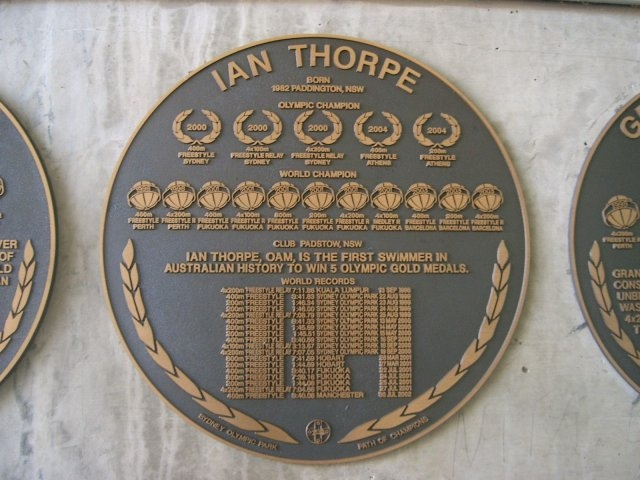
- Plaque commemorating Ian Thorpe's Olympic performances, including a gold medal in this event
- Venue: Athens Olympic Aquatic Centre
- Dates: August 15, 2004 (heats & semifinals); August 16, 2004 (final)
- Competitors: 59 from 53 nations
- Winning time: 1:44.71 OR

Medalists
1st place, gold medalist(s)		Ian Thorpe; Australia
2nd place, silver medalist(s)		Pieter van den Hoogenband; Netherlands
3rd place, bronze medalist(s)		Michael Phelps; United States

The men's 200 metre freestyle event at the 2004 Summer Olympics was contested at the Olympic Aquatic Centre of the Athens Olympic Sports Complex in Athens, Greece. The event took place on 15 and 16 August. There were 59 competitors from 53 nations, with each nation having up to two swimmers (a limit in place since 1984).

In the lead-up to the final, the event was billed as The Race of the Century or the "greatest swimming race of all-time", due to its significance and high-class field. It featured four of the fastest swimmers in Olympic history: Ian Thorpe (Australia, world record holder in the event at the time), Pieter van den Hoogenband (Netherlands, defending Olympic champion), Grant Hackett (Australia, former world record holder in the event), and Michael Phelps (United States, later became the most decorated all-time Olympian, with a total of 28 medals). The eight finalists combined for 34 Olympic and 58 World Championship titles over their careers.

Thorpe edged out Pieter van den Hoogenband in the final 50 metres to claim his second gold at the Games and fifth career medal, following his triumph in the 400 m freestyle two days earlier. With only 50 metres to go, he powered past his arch-rival to touch the wall first in an Olympic record of 1:44.71, matching the third fastest swim over the distance. Van den Hoogenband, who led the field through the first three laps under a world record pace, won silver in 1:45.23. Meanwhile, Phelps finished the race with a bronze in an American record of 1:45.32, ending his hopes of equalling Mark Spitz's 1972 record of seven gold medals. (Phelps would pass that record in 2008.)

Thorpe and van den Hoogenband were the second and third men to win multiple medals in the 200 metre freestyle. Phelps would become the fourth in 2008.

== Background ==
This was the 12th appearance of the 200 metre freestyle event. It was first contested in 1900. It would be contested a second time, though at 220 yards, in 1904. After that, the event did not return until 1968; since then, it has been on the programme at every Summer Games.

Four of the 8 finalists from the 2000 Games returned: gold medalist Pieter van den Hoogenband of the Netherlands, silver medalist Ian Thorpe of Australia, seventh-place finisher Rick Say of Canada, and eighth-place finisher Grant Hackett of Australia. Thorpe and van den Hoogenband had finished first and second, respectively, at both the 2001 and 2003 World Championships. American Klete Keller had taken third in 2001, with Hackett earning bronze in 2003. Added to this already strong field was Michael Phelps—an individual medley specialist who had set an American record in the 200 metre freestyle as the lead leg at the 2003 World Championships (not swimming the individual event there) and beaten Keller by six-tenths of a second at the U.S. trials.

The Cayman Islands, Chile, Georgia, Latvia, Macedonia, Morocco, and Serbia and Montenegro each made their debut in the event. Australia made its 12th appearance, the only nation to have competed in all prior editions of the event.

== Competition format ==
The competition followed the format established in 2000, with three rounds: heats, semifinals, and a final. The advancement rule followed the format introduced in 1952. A swimmer's place in the heat was not used to determine advancement; instead, the fastest times from across all heats in a round were used. The top 16 swimmers from the heats advanced to the semifinals. The top 8 semifinalists advanced to the final. Swim-offs were used as necessary to break ties.

This swimming event used freestyle swimming, which means that the method of the stroke is not regulated (unlike backstroke, breaststroke, and butterfly events). Nearly all swimmers use the front crawl or a variant of that stroke. Because an Olympic-size swimming pool is 50 metres long, this race consisted of four lengths of the pool.

== Records ==
Prior to this competition, the existing world and Olympic records were as follows:

World record	Ian Thorpe (AUS)	1:44.06	Fukuoka, Japan	25 July 2001
Olympic record	Pieter van den Hoogenband (NED)	1:45.35	Sydney, Australia	18 September 2000

The following records were established during the competition:

Date	Event	Swimmer	Nation	Time	Record
16 August	Final	Ian Thorpe	Australia	1:44.71	OR

== Schedule ==
All times are Greece Standard Time (UTC+2)

Date	Time	Round
Sunday, 15 August 2004	10:19; 19:44	Heats; Semifinals
Monday, 16 August 2004	19:45	Final

== Results ==
=== Heats ===
Rank	Heat	Lane	Swimmer	Nation	Time	Notes
1	8	4	Ian Thorpe	Australia	1:47.22	Q
2	8	5	Pieter van den Hoogenband	Netherlands	1:47.32	Q
3	8	3	Emiliano Brembilla	Italy	1:47.95	Q
4	7	5	Klete Keller	United States	1:47.97	Q
5	6	4	Michael Phelps	United States	1:48.43	Q
6	8	6	Simon Burnett	Great Britain	1:48.68	Q
7	7	4	Grant Hackett	Australia	1:48.90	Q
8	7	6	Jens Schreiber	Germany	1:49.00	Q, WD
9	8	2	Květoslav Svoboda	Czech Republic	1:49.25	Q
10	6	5	Rick Say	Canada	1:49.32	Q
11	8	1	Dominik Meichtry	Switzerland	1:49.45	Q
12	7	7	George Bovell	Trinidad and Tobago	1:49.48	Q
13	7	2	Yoshihiro Okumura	Japan	1:49.54	Q
14	7	3	Brent Hayden	Canada	1:49.56	Q
15	7	8	Andreas Zisimos	Greece	1:49.60	Q
16	6	3	Andrey Kapralov	Russia	1:49.91	Q
17	6	7	Olaf Wildeboer	Spain	1:50.01	Q
18	5	3	Jacob Carstensen	Denmark	1:50.15	
19	6	6	Stefan Herbst	Germany	1:50.23	
20	6	1	Rodrigo Castro	Brazil	1:50.27	
21	5	8	Saulius Binevičius	Lithuania	1:50.50	
22	8	7	Peter Mankoč	Slovenia	1:50.72	
23	5	4	Romāns Miloslavskis	Latvia	1:50.83	
24	7	1	Maksim Kuznetsov	Russia	1:50.93	
25	8	8	Nicolas Rostoucher	France	1:50.96	
26	5	5	Dominik Koll	Austria	1:51.36	
27	4	2	Dmytro Vereitinov	Ukraine	1:51.38	
28	4	3	Joshua Ilika Brenner	Mexico	1:51.66	
29	5	1	Luís Monteiro	Portugal	1:51.78	
30	5	1	Łukasz Drzewiński	Poland	1:51.90	
31	2	6	Mihail Alexandrov	Bulgaria	1:52.12	
32	5	7	Tamás Szűcs	Hungary	1:52.26	
33	5	6	Han Kyu-chul	South Korea	1:52.28	
34	4	8	Damian Alleyne	Barbados	1:52.89	
35	3	2	Aleksandar Malenko	Macedonia	1:53.00	
35	4	7	Mahrez Mebarek	Algeria	1:53.00	
37	4	5	Yahor Salabutau	Belarus	1:53.03	
38	3	5	Albert Subirats	Venezuela	1:53.11	
39	4	6	Giancarlo Zolezzi	Chile	1:53.18	
40	3	7	Juan Martín Pereyra	Argentina	1:53.19	
40	3	8	Shaune Fraser	Cayman Islands	1:53.19	
42	4	1	Miguel Molina	Philippines	1:53.81	
43	6	8	Zhang Lin	China	1:53.84	
44	3	3	Alexandros Aresti	Cyprus	1:53.90	
45	2	3	Martín Kutscher	Uruguay	1:53.91	
46	6	2	Andrea Beccari	Italy	1:54.00	
47	3	4	Chen Te-tung	Chinese Taipei	1:54.14	
48	1	5	Igor Erhartić	Serbia and Montenegro	1:54.21	
49	2	5	Ştefan Pinciuc	Moldova	1:54.56	
50	2	1	Anouar Ben Naceur	Tunisia	1:54.69	
51	2	2	Mark Chay	Singapore	1:54.70	
52	4	4	Aytekin Mindan	Turkey	1:55.65	
53	2	4	Adil Bellaz	Morocco	1:55.79	
54	3	6	Mario Delač	Croatia	1:55.82	
55	2	7	Vitaliy Khan	Kazakhstan	1:56.11	
56	3	1	Diego Mularoni	San Marino	1:56.18	
57	2	8	Petr Vasiliev	Uzbekistan	1:56.93	
58	1	3	Zurab Khomasuridze	Georgia	1:58.02	
59	1	4	Ruslan Ismailov	Kyrgyzstan	2:01.53	

=== Semifinals ===
Rank	Heat	Lane	Swimmer	Nation	Time	Notes
1	1	4	Pieter van den Hoogenband	Netherlands	1:46.00	Q
2	2	4	Ian Thorpe	Australia	1:46.65	Q
3	2	3	Michael Phelps	United States	1:47.08	Q
4	1	5	Klete Keller	United States	1:47.28	Q
5	2	6	Grant Hackett	Australia	1:47.61	Q
6	1	3	Simon Burnett	Great Britain	1:47.72	Q
7	2	5	Emiliano Brembilla	Italy	1:47.93	Q
8	2	2	Rick Say	Canada	1:48.16	Q
9	1	6	Květoslav Svoboda	Czech Republic	1:49.27	
10	1	7	Yoshihiro Okumura	Japan	1:49.49	
11	2	7	George Bovell	Trinidad and Tobago	1:49.59	
12	1	1	Andreas Zisimos	Greece	1:49.76	
13	2	1	Brent Hayden	Canada	1:50.00	
14	1	2	Dominik Meichtry	Switzerland	1:50.02	
15	1	8	Olaf Wildeboer	Spain	1:50.61	
16	2	8	Andrey Kapralov	Russia	1:51.35	

=== Final ===
Rank	Lane	Swimmer	Nation	Time	Notes
1st place, gold medalist(s)	5	Ian Thorpe	Australia	1:44.71	OR
2nd place, silver medalist(s)	4	Pieter van den Hoogenband	Netherlands	1:45.23	
3rd place, bronze medalist(s)	3	Michael Phelps	United States	1:45.32	AM
4	6	Klete Keller	United States	1:46.13	
5	2	Grant Hackett	Australia	1:46.56	
6	8	Rick Say	Canada	1:47.55	
7	7	Simon Burnett	Great Britain	1:48.02	
8	1	Emiliano Brembilla	Italy	1:48.40	
