= Swimming at the 2008 Summer Olympics – Men's 200 metre freestyle =

Men's 200 metre freestyle at the Games of the XXIX Olympiad
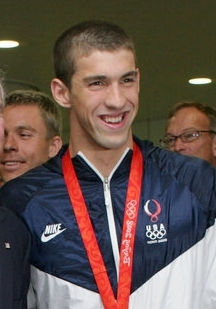
- Gold medalist Michael Phelps
- Venue: Beijing National Aquatics Center
- Dates: August 10, 2008 (heats); August 11, 2008 (semifinals); August 12, 2008 (final)
- Competitors: 58 from 50 nations
- Winning time: 1:42.96 WR

Medalists
1st place, gold medalist(s)		Michael Phelps	United States
2nd place, silver medalist(s)		Park Tae-Hwan	South Korea
3rd place, bronze medalist(s)		Peter Vanderkaay	United States

The men's 200 metre freestyle event at the 2008 Olympic Games took place on 10–12 August at the Beijing National Aquatics Center in Beijing, China. There were 58 competitors from 50 nations. The winning margin was 1.89 seconds which as of 2023 remains the only time this race has been won by more than 1.8 seconds at the Olympics.

After winning a bronze in Athens four years earlier, Michael Phelps blasted a new world record of 1:42.96 to claim his third straight gold, ninth career, and eleventh overall medal at the Olympics. South Korea's Park Tae-Hwan added a silver to his collection, following an unprecedented triumph in the 400 m freestyle two days earlier. He established a new Asian record of 1:44.85 to clear a 1:45 barrier, and used a final-lap split of 26.17 to edge out Phelps' teammate Peter Vanderkaay, who took home a bronze medal in a personal best of 1:45.14.

South Africa's Jean Basson finished fourth with a time of 1:45.97, and was followed in the fifth spot by Germany's Paul Biedermann in 1:46.00. Switzerland's Dominik Meichtry, who raced to a top seed in the prelims, earned a sixth spot in 1:46.95, while Japan's Yoshihiro Okumura (1:47.14) and Great Britain's Robbie Renwick (1:47.47) rounded out the finale. Renwick missed out the semifinals by 0.01 of a second from the prelims, but was offered a second shot, following a sudden withdrawal of two swimmers. Canada's Brent Hayden and France's Amaury Leveaux later scratched the event to focus on their duty in the 4 × 100 m freestyle relay.

Phelps's gold medal was the first American victory in this event since Mark Spitz and Bruce Furniss went back-to-back in 1972 and 1976. Phelps was the fourth man to win multiple medals in the 200 metre freestyle. He and Vanderkaay were the first teammates to make the podium in the event together since West Germany had two medalists in 1984. Park's medal was South Korea's first in the men's 200 metre freestyle. Australia's three-Games medal streak in the event ended.

== Background ==
This was the 13th appearance of the 200 metre freestyle event. It was first contested in 1900. It would be contested a second time, though at 220 yards, in 1904. After that, the event did not return until 1968; since then, it has been on the programme at every Summer Games.

Two of the 8 finalists from the 2004 Games returned: bronze medalist Michael Phelps of the United States and eighth-place finisher Emiliano Brembilla of Italy. The bronze medal in this event, his weakest, had ended Phelps's attempt to break Mark Spitz's record of 7 gold medals in a single Games; this time, Phelps was the clear favourite in the event with two consecutive World Championships in the event between the 2004 and 2008 Games and no Ian Thorpe (retired) or Pieter van den Hoogenband (competing in the 100 metre freestyle) to contend with. The 2007 Worlds bronze medalist, Park Tae-hwan of South Korea (who had just won the 400 metre freestyle gold in Beijing), was a podium contender, as was Phelps's teammate Peter Vanderkaay.

Brembilla was joined on the Italian team by 2000 bronze medalist Massimiliano Rosolino, returning after not competing in this event in 2004.

Costa Rica, Estonia, Papua New Guinea, Serbia, and South Africa each made their debut in the event. Australia made its 13th appearance, the only nation to have competed in all prior editions of the event.

== Qualification ==
Each National Olympic Committee (NOC) could enter up to two swimmers if both met the A qualifying standard, or one swimmer if he met the B standard. For 2008, the A standard was 1:48.72 while the B standard was 1:52.53. The qualifying window was 15 March 2007 to 15 July 2008; only approved meets (generally international competitions and national Olympic trials) during that period could be used to meet the standards. There were also universality places available; if no male swimmer from a nation qualified in any event, the NOC could enter one male swimmer in an event.

The two swimmers per NOC limit had been in place since the 1984 Games.

== Competition format ==
The competition followed the format established in 2000, with three rounds: heats, semifinals, and a final. The advancement rule followed the format introduced in 1952. A swimmer's place in the heat was not used to determine advancement; instead, the fastest times from across all heats in a round were used. The top 16 swimmers from the heats advanced to the semifinals. The top 8 semifinalists advanced to the final. Swim-offs were used as necessary to break ties.

This swimming event used freestyle swimming, which means that the method of the stroke is not regulated (unlike backstroke, breaststroke, and butterfly events). Nearly all swimmers use the front crawl or a variant of that stroke. Because an Olympic-size swimming pool is 50 metres long, this race consisted of four lengths of the pool.

== Records ==
Prior to this competition, the existing world and Olympic records were as follows.

World record	Michael Phelps (USA)	1:43.86	Melbourne, Australia	27 March 2007	
Olympic record	Ian Thorpe (AUS)	1:44.71	Athens, Greece	16 August 2004	-

The following new world and Olympic records were set during this competition.

Date	Event	Swimmer	Nation	Time	Record
August 12	Final	Michael Phelps	United States	1:42.96	WR

== Schedule ==
The competition moved to a three-day schedule, rather than two days as in the past.

All times are China Standard Time (UTC+8)

Date	Time	Round
Sunday, 10 August 2008	18:54	Heats
Monday, 11 August 2008	10:14	Semifinals
Tuesday, 12 August 2008	10:16	Final

== Results ==
=== Heats ===
Rank	Heat	Lane	Swimmer	Nation	Time	Notes
1	8	2	Dominik Meichtry	Switzerland	1:45.80	Q, NR
2	6	4	Jean Basson	South Africa	1:46.31	Q
3	6	2	Brent Hayden	Canada	1:46.40	Q, WD
4	8	4	Michael Phelps	United States	1:46.48	Q
5	6	3	Colin Russell	Canada	1:46.58	Q
6	8	5	Park Tae-Hwan	South Korea	1:46.73	Q
7	8	3	Danila Izotov	Russia	1:46.80	Q
8	8	7	Yoshihiro Okumura	Japan	1:46.89	Q, NR
9	6	7	Emiliano Brembilla	Italy	1:47.04	Q
10	7	5	Paul Biedermann	Germany	1:47.09	Q
11	8	6	Ross Davenport	Great Britain	1:47.13	Q
12	7	4	Peter Vanderkaay	United States	1:47.39	Q
13	6	5	Amaury Leveaux	France	1:47.44	Q, WD
14	6	6	Nicholas Sprenger	Australia	1:47.64	Q
15	5	6	Nimrod Shapira Bar-Or	Israel	1:47.78	Q, NR
16	8	1	Dominik Koll	Austria	1:47.81	Q, NR
17	7	7	Robbie Renwick	Great Britain	1:47.82	
18	6	1	Rodrigo Castro	Brazil	1:47.87	
19	6	8	Oussama Mellouli	Tunisia	1:47.97	
19	7	3	Alexander Sukhorukov	Russia	1:47.97	
21	5	5	Darian Townsend	South Africa	1:48.08	
22	7	6	Kenrick Monk	Australia	1:48.17	
23	5	1	Sergiy Advena	Ukraine	1:48.18	NR
24	5	4	Sho Uchida	Japan	1:48.34	
25	7	8	Romāns Miloslavskis	Latvia	1:48.41	NR
26	5	2	Shaune Fraser	Cayman Islands	1:48.60	
27	4	4	Gard Kvale	Norway	1:48.73	NR
28	7	2	Massimiliano Rosolino	Italy	1:48.76	
29	5	3	Andreas Zisimos	Greece	1:48.82	
30	5	8	Glenn Surgeloose	Belgium	1:48.92	
31	4	7	Jon Raahauge Rud	Denmark	1:48.96	
32	3	5	Ryan Pini	Papua New Guinea	1:49.04	
33	7	1	Zhang Enjian	China	1:49.15	
34	8	8	Łukasz Gąsior	Poland	1:49.25	
35	4	5	Norbert Kovács	Hungary	1:49.34	
36	4	6	Martín Kutscher	Uruguay	1:49.61	
37	3	1	Dominik Straga	Croatia	1:49.63	
38	4	3	Christoffer Wikström	Sweden	1:49.84	
39	5	7	Tiago Venâncio	Portugal	1:50.24	
40	3	7	Radovan Siljevski	Serbia	1:50.25	
41	2	6	Bryan Tay	Singapore	1:50.41	NR
42	3	3	Crox Acuña	Venezuela	1:50.52	
43	3	2	Julio Galofre	Colombia	1:50.62	
44	3	6	Daniel Bego	Malaysia	1:50.92	
45	2	5	Vladimir Sidorkin	Estonia	1:51.27	NR
46	4	2	Květoslav Svoboda	Czech Republic	1:51.67	
47	3	8	Saulius Binevičius	Lithuania	1:51.80	
48	4	8	Virdhawal Khade	India	1:51.86	
49	4	1	Raphaël Stacchiotti	Luxembourg	1:52.01	
50	2	3	Mario Montoya	Costa Rica	1:52.19	NR
51	2	4	Mahrez Mebarek	Algeria	1:52.66	
52	2	2	Artur Dilman	Kazakhstan	1:52.90	
53	1	4	Irakli Revishvili	Georgia	1:53.60	
54	2	1	Ibrahim Nazarov	Uzbekistan	1:56.27	
55	1	3	Mihajlo Ristovski	Macedonia	1:57.45	
56	2	7	Andrei Zaharov	Moldova	1:58.62	
57	1	5	Emanuele Nicolini	San Marino	1:59.47	
—	3	4	Luka Turk	Slovenia	DNS	

=== Semifinals ===
Rank	Heat	Lane	Swimmer	Nation	Time	Notes
1	2	7	Peter Vanderkaay	United States	1:45.76	Q
2	2	3	Park Tae-Hwan	South Korea	1:45.99	Q, AS
3	1	4	Jean Basson	South Africa	1:46.13	Q
4	2	5	Michael Phelps	United States	1:46.28	Q
5	2	2	Paul Biedermann	Germany	1:46.41	Q
6	2	6	Yoshihiro Okumura	Japan	1:46.44	Q, NR
7	2	4	Dominik Meichtry	Switzerland	1:46.54	Q
8	2	8	Robbie Renwick	Great Britain	1:47.07	Q
9	1	3	Danila Izotov	Russia	1:47.24	
10	1	2	Ross Davenport	Great Britain	1:47.35	
11	1	6	Emiliano Brembilla	Italy	1:47.70	
12	1	7	Nicholas Sprenger	Australia	1:47.80	
13	1	1	Dominik Koll	Austria	1:47.87	
14	1	5	Colin Russell	Canada	1:48.13	
15	2	1	Nimrod Shapira Bar-Or	Israel	1:48.16	
16	1	8	Rodrigo Castro	Brazil	1:48.71	

=== Final ===
Rank	Lane	Swimmer	Nation	Time	Notes
1st place, gold medalist(s)	6	Michael Phelps	United States	1:42.96	WR
2nd place, silver medalist(s)	5	Park Tae-Hwan	South Korea	1:44.85	AS
3rd place, bronze medalist(s)	4	Peter Vanderkaay	United States	1:45.14	
4	3	Jean Basson	South Africa	1:45.97	
5	2	Paul Biedermann	Germany	1:46.00	
6	1	Dominik Meichtry	Switzerland	1:46.95	
7	7	Yoshihiro Okumura	Japan	1:47.14	
8	8	Robbie Renwick	Great Britain	1:47.47	
