= Damian Alleyne =

Barbadian swimmer (born 1983)

Personal information
- Full name: Damian Arthur Christopher; Alleyne
- National team: Barbados
- Born: 31 March 1983 (age 43) Bridgetown, Barbados
- Height: 1.80 m (5 ft 11 in)
- Weight: 84 kg (185 lb)

Sport
- Sport: Swimming
- Strokes: Freestyle
- College team: University of Georgia (U.S.)

Damian Arthur Christopher Alleyne (born March 31, 1983) is a Barbadian former swimmer who specialized in freestyle events. He is a two-time Olympian (2000 and 2004), a varsity swimmer for the Georgia Bulldogs, and a graduate of Bolles School and the University of Georgia, with a major in business administration.

Alleyne made his official debut, as a 17-year-old, at the 2000 Summer Olympics in Sydney. He failed to advance into the succeeding rounds in any of his individual events, finishing twenty-seventh in the 200 m freestyle (1:52.75), and twenty-sixth in the 400 m freestyle (3:58.12).

At the 2004 Summer Olympics in Athens, Alleyne maintained his program by qualifying for two swimming events. He cleared FINA B-standard entry times of 51.89 (100 m freestyle) and 1:53.19 (200 m freestyle) from the Pan American Games in Santo Domingo, Dominican Republic. In the 200 m freestyle, Alleyne challenged seven other swimmers on the third heat, including fellow two-time Olympians Joshua Ilika Brenner of Mexico and Giancarlo Zolezzi of Chile. He edged out Algeria's Mahrez Mebarek to take a third spot and thirty-fourth overall by 0.11 of a second in 1:52.89. In his second event, 100 m freestyle, Alleyne placed forty-eighth overall on the morning's preliminaries. Swimming in heat three, Alleyne matched his entry time of 51.89 to save a fifth spot over Zolezzi's compatriot Max Schnettler by 0.02 of a second.
