= Livnat =

Livnat is a surname in modern Israel, most commonly translated as "Stone of".

The name is an ancient Hebrew word, derived from Exodus 24:10: "וַיִּרְאוּ אֵת אֱלֹהֵי יִשְׂרָאֵל וְתַחַת רַגְלָיו כְּמַעֲשֵׂה לִבְנַת הַסַּפִּיר וּכְעֶצֶם הַשָּׁמַיִם לָטֹהַר" This is most commonly translated as "And they saw the God of Israel: and there was under his feet as it were a paved work of a sapphire stone, and as it were the body of heaven in his clearness."

The word Livnat has no direct translation as a word; in both ancient and modern Hebrew grammar, the final "-at" suffix means "of", thus the word may be translated as "stone of," which when taken beside the word "sapphire" becomes the stone of sapphire. The word may be alternately translated as "whiteness of" or "clearness of", though these translations are somewhat less common.

Notable people with the surname include:

- Avraham Livnat) (1924–2017), Israeli businessman, founder of the Taavuura Holdings and its director
- Limor Livnat, Israeli Minister of Culture and Sport
- Shai Livnat, Israeli swimmer
- Shulamit Livnat (1929–2021), Israeli a singer, political activist on the Israeli right, and an Israeli public figure
