= Ibrahim Nazarov =

Uzbekistani swimmer (born 1988)

Personal information
- Full name: Ibrahim Nazarov
- National team: Uzbekistan
- Born: 17 August 1988 (age 37) Tashkent, Uzbek SSR, Soviet Union
- Height: 1.90 m (6 ft 3 in)
- Weight: 70 kg (154 lb)

Sport
- Sport: Swimming
- Strokes: Freestyle
- Club: SZ Navoi
- Coach: Daniya Galandinova

Ibrahim Nazarov (Uzbek: Ибрагим Назаров; born April 17, 1988) is an Uzbekistani swimmer, who specialized in freestyle events. A member of SZ Navoi swimming club under the tutelage of his coach Daniya Galandinova, Nazarov represented his nation Uzbekistan at the 2008 Summer Olympics, finishing in the top 60 of the men's 200 m freestyle.

Nazarov qualified for the men's 200 m freestyle at the 2008 Summer Olympics in Beijing, by clearing a B-standard entry time of 1:52.49 from the Russia Open Swimming Championships in Saint Petersburg. He challenged six other swimmers on the second heat, including Olympic veterans Mahrez Mebarek of Algeria and Andrei Zaharov of Moldova. Nazarov raced to sixth place by four seconds behind Kazakhstan's Artur Dilman in a time of 1:56.27. Nazarov failed to advance into the semifinals, as he placed fifty-fourth overall in the prelims.
