= Maksim Kuznetsov =

Maksim Kuznetsov may refer to:

- Maxim Kuznetsov (born 1977), Kazakhstani former ice hockey player
- Maksim Kuznetsov (swimmer) (born 1982), Russian former swimmer
