= Ruslan Ismailov (swimmer) =

Kyrgyzstani swimmer (born 1989)

Personal information
- Full name: Ruslan Ismailov
- National team: Kyrgyzstan
- Born: 4 October 1989 (age 36) Frunze, Kirghiz SSR, Soviet Union
- Height: 1.84 m (6 ft 0 in)
- Weight: 75 kg (165 lb)

Sport
- Sport: Swimming
- Strokes: Freestyle

Ruslan Ismailov (Russian: Руслан Исмаилов; born October 4, 1989) is a Kyrgyz former swimmer, who specialized in freestyle events. Ismailov became one of the youngest swimmers (aged 14) to compete at the 2004 Summer Olympics in Athens, representing his nation Kyrgyzstan. He qualified for the men's 200 m freestyle, by clearing a FINA B-standard entry time of 1:55.06 from the Russian Championships in Moscow. He participated in heat one against two other swimmers Igor Erhartić of Serbia and Montenegro, and Zurab Khomasuridze of Georgia. Ismailov rounded out the small field of three to last place with a time of 2:01.53, nearly 17 seconds off the world record set by Ian Thorpe in 2001. Ismailov failed to advance into the semifinals, as he placed fifty-ninth overall in the preliminaries.
