= Wildeboer =

Wildeboer is a Dutch surname. Notable people with the surname include:

- Aschwin Wildeboer (born 1986), Spanish Olympic backstroke swimmer
- Olaf Wildeboer (born 1983), Spanish Olympic freestyle swimmer
- Tijmen Wildeboer (born 2001), Dutch footballer
