= Mihajlo Ristovski =

Macedonian swimmer (born 1983)

Personal information
- National team: North Macedonia
- Born: 3 March 1983 (age 43) Struga, SR Macedonia, SFR Yugoslavia
- Height: 1.74 m (5 ft 9 in)
- Weight: 70 kg (154 lb)

Sport
- Sport: Swimming
- Strokes: Freestyle
- Club: PK Akvatik

Mihajlo Ristovski (Macedonian: Михајло Ристовски; born 3 March 1983) is a former Macedonian swimmer, who specialized in freestyle events. He represented the Republic of Macedonia at the 2008 Summer Olympics, placing among the top 60 swimmers in the 200m freestyle.

Ristovski was invited by FINA through the Universality rule to compete as the sole male swimmer for Macedonia in the men's 200 m freestyle at the 2008 Summer Olympics in Beijing. Swimming against Georgia's Irakli Revishvili and twice Olympian Emanuele Nicolini of San Marino in heat one, Ristovski aimed his way into second place and 55^{th} overall in his lifetime best at 1:57.45, which was not enough to put him further to the semifinals.
