= Ruslan Ismailov =

Ruslan Ismailov may refer to

- Ruslan Ismailov (sport shooter) (born 1986), Kyrgyzstani sport shooter
- Ruslan Ismailov (swimmer) (born 1989), Kyrgyzstani swimmer
