= Swimming at the 2001 World Aquatics Championships – Men's 100 metre freestyle =

Men's 100 metre freestyle at the 2001 FINA World Championships
- Dates: 26 July 2001 (heats, semifinals); 27 July 2001 (final)
- Competitors: 88
- Winning time: 48.33 seconds

Medalists
gold medal	Anthony Ervin	United States
silver medal	Pieter Van Den Hoogenband	Netherlands
bronze medal	Lars Frölander	Sweden

The men's 100 metre freestyle event at the 2001 World Aquatics Championships took place 27 July. The heats and semifinals were held on 26 July.

== Records ==
Prior to the competition, the existing world and championship records were as follows.

World record	Pieter van den Hoogenband (NED)	47.84	Sydney, Australia	19 September 2000
Championship record	Alexander Popov (RUS)	48.74	Perth, Australia	15 January 1998

The following records were established during the competition:

Date	Round	Name	Nationality	Time	Record
26 July	Semifinal 2	Pieter van den Hoogenband	Netherlands	48.57	CR
27 July	Final	Anthony Ervin	United States	48.33	CR

== Results ==
=== Heats ===
Rank	Swimmer	Nation	Time	Notes
1	Pieter van den Hoogenband	Netherlands	48.96	Q
2	Anthony Ervin	United States	49.08	Q
3	Ian Thorpe	Australia	49.21	Q
4	Torsten Spanneberg	Germany	49.40	Q
5	Ashley Callus	Australia	49.46	Q
6	Jason Lezak	United States	49.51	Q
7	José Meolans	Argentina	49.65	Q
7	Stefan Nystrand	Sweden	49.65	Q
9	Attila Zubor	Hungary	49.65	Q
10	Lars Frölander	Sweden	49.76	Q
11	Salim Iles	Algeria	49.80	Q
11	Gustavo Borges	Brazil	49.80	Q
13	Lars Conrad	Germany	49.89	Q
14	Duje Draganja	Croatia	49.90	Q
15	Edvaldo Valério	Brazil	50.03	Q
16	Johan Kenkhuis	Netherlands	50.08	Q
17	Roland Schoeman	South Africa	50.13	
17	Bartosz Kizierowski	Poland	50.13	
19	Vyacheslav Shyrshov	Ukraine	50.22	
20	Karel Novy	Switzerland	50.25	
21	Simone Cercato	Italy	50.41	
22	Rolandas Gimbutis	Lithuania	50.65	
23	Nicholas Folker	South Africa	50.66	
24	Ivan Mladina	Croatia	50.73	
25	Jorge Ulibarri	Spain	50.76	
26	Yoshihiro Okumura	Japan	50.91	
27	Riley Janes	Canada	51.19	
28	Shunsuke Ito	Japan	51.29	
29	Maxim Korshunov	Russia	51.40	
30	Oleksandr Volynets	Ukraine	51.52	
31	Oswaldo Quevedo	Venezuela	51.63	
32	Kim Min-Seok	South Korea	51.71	
33	Danil Haustov	Estonia	51.78	
34	Xie Xufeng	China	51.81	
35	Christoph Bühler	Switzerland	51.87	
36	Ouyang Kunpeng	China	51.88	
37	Saulius Binevičius	Lithuania	51.97	
38	Carl Probert	Fiji	52.15	
39	Alejandro Siqueiros	Mexico	52.30	
40	Camilo Becerra	Colombia	52.41	
41	Wu Nien-Pin	Chinese Taipei	52.70	
42	Mark Chay	Singapore	52.77	
43	Ismael Ortiz	Panama	52.93	
44	Brendan Ashby	Zimbabwe	53.14	
45	Gustavo Barrios	Panama	53.34	
46	Ernest Teo	Singapore	53.39	
47	Christophe Lim Wen Ying	Mauritius	53.64	
48	Jacob Fraire	Mexico	53.76	
49	Harbeth Fu Wing	Hong Kong	53.79	
50	Victor Rogut	Moldova	53.93	
51	Chon Kit Alias Joao Tang	Macau	53.94	
52	Gregory Arkhurst	Ivory Coast	54.01	
53	Christophee Backisavs	Dominican Republic	54.05	
54	Ronald Cowen	Bermuda	54.65	
55	Nicholas Diaper	Kenya	54.71	
56	Kenny Roberts	Seychelles	54.76	
57	Cliff Gittens	Barbados	54.96	
58	Vakhtang Beridze	Georgia	54.99	
59	Jiang Bing-Ru	Chinese Taipei	55.03	
60	Obaid Ahmed Al Jassimi	United Arab Emirates	55.05	
61	Saad Khalloqi	Morocco	55.08	
62	Khuwiater Saeed Had Al Dhaheri	United Arab Emirates	55.15	
63	Gael Souci	Mauritius	55.21	
64	Khaly Ciss	Senegal	55.25	
65	Davy Rolando Bisslik	Aruba	55.32	
66	Aleksey Bortnikov	Uzbekistan	55.56	
67	Barnsley Albert	Seychelles	55.91	
68	Arwut Chinnapasaen	Thailand	55.92	
69	Wing Cheung Victor Wong	Macau	56.24	
70	Omar Núñez	Nicaragua	56.75	
71	Yu Lung Lubrey Lim	Malaysia	57.23	
72	Zie Ahmed Oyattara	Ivory Coast	57.44	
73	Onan Thom	Guyana	57.56	
74	Hamid Nassir	Kenya	57.68	
75	Rainui Teriipaia	Tahiti	57.69	
76	João Aguiar	Angola	57.76	
77	Seung Gin Lee	Northern Mariana Islands	57.83	
78	Mark Unpingco	Guam	58.33	
79	William Kang	Guam	58.36	
80	Ganaa Galbadrakh	Mongolia	58.49	
81	Nuno Miguel Cardoso Rola	Angola	58.51	
82	Dean Palacios	Northern Mariana Islands	58.77	
83	Sule Cole Shade	Cameroon	1:01.70	
84	Rony Bakale	Republic of the Congo	1:02.38	
85	Joe Atuhairwe	Uganda	1:07.71	
86	Ibrahim Ismael Mamadou	Niger	1:11.78	
87	Fabrice Ndikumana	Burundi	1:15.05	
88	Joshua Robert Marfleet	Samoa	1:29.41	
–	Eithan Urbach	Israel	DNS	
–	Hesham Shehab	Brunei	DNS	
–	Richard Sam Bera	Indonesia	DNS	
–	George Bovell	Trinidad and Tobago	DNS	
–	Lorenzo Vismara	Italy	DNS	
–	Peter Mankoč	Slovenia	DNS	

=== Semifinals ===
Rank	Swimmer	Nation	Time	Notes
1	Pieter van den Hoogenband	Netherlands	48.57	Q, CR
2	Ian Thorpe	Australia	48.96	Q
3	Attila Zubor	Hungary	49.32	Q
4	Ashley Callus	Australia	49.38	Q
5	Anthony Ervin	United States	49.43	Q
6	Jason Lezak	United States	49.49	Q
7	Lars Frölander	Sweden	49.54	Q
8	Torsten Spanneberg	Germany	49.60	Q
9	José Meolans	Argentina	49.69	
10	Duje Draganja	Croatia	49.79	
11	Stefan Nystrand	Sweden	49.80	
12	Gustavo Borges	Brazil	49.89	
13	Salim Iles	Algeria	49.90	
14	Lars Conrad	Germany	49.92	
15	Edvaldo Valério	Brazil	49.93	
16	Johan Kenkhuis	Netherlands	50.05	

=== Final ===
Rank	Name	Nationality	Time	Notes
1st place, gold medalist(s)	Anthony Ervin	United States	48.33	CR, AM
2nd place, silver medalist(s)	Pieter van den Hoogenband	Netherlands	48.43	
3rd place, bronze medalist(s)	Lars Frölander	Sweden	48.79	
4	Ian Thorpe	Australia	48.81	
5	Attila Zubor	Hungary	49.13	
6	Torsten Spanneberg	Germany	49.35	
7	Ashley Callus	Australia	49.39	
8	Jason Lezak	United States	49.51	
