= Łukasz Wójt =

Polish swimmer

Personal information
- Full name: Łukasz Wójt
- National team: Poland
- Born: 13 May 1982 (age 44) Gdańsk, Poland
- Height: 1.84 m (6 ft 0 in)
- Weight: 67 kg (148 lb)

Sport
- Sport: Swimming
- Strokes: Freestyle, medley
- Club: EOSC Offenbach
- Coach: Danuta Wójt
Medal record
Men's swimming
Representing Poland
Universiade
Bronze medal – third place	2007 Bangkok	200 m medley
European Championships (SC)
Bronze medal – third place	2008 Rijeka	400 m medley

Łukasz Wójt (born 13 May 1982) is a Polish swimmer, who specialized in middle-distance freestyle and individual medley events. He represented his nation Poland at the 2008 Summer Olympics, and has won two bronze medals in a major international competition, spanning the 2007 Summer Universiade in Bangkok, Thailand, and the 2008 European Short Course Championships in Rijeka, Croatia. Apart from his international career, Wojt has also claimed multiple Polish championship titles and currently holds the national record in the 200 (1:54.81) and 400 m individual medley (4:03.20), both set at the FINA World Cup meet in Berlin, Germany.

Wojt competed for the Polish squad in two swimming events at the 2008 Summer Olympics in Beijing. He qualified for the Games with a third-place time in 2:00.32 to clear the sub-2:01 barrier and achieve the FINA A-cut in the 200 m individual medley (2:01.40) at the Summer Universiade one year earlier in Bangkok, Thailand. In the 4 × 200 m freestyle relay, Wojt and his teammates Łukasz Gąsior, Michał Rokicki, and Przemysław Stańczyk finished the second heat of the prelims with an aggregate time of 7:18.09. Swimming the second leg, Wojt recorded a split of 1:48.54, the fastest of the Polish foursome. In the 200 m individual medley, Wojt put up a fantastic swim with a help of his powerful backstroke leg to take the sixth spot in heat four with a 2:01.54, but fell short for the semifinals, finishing twenty-sixth overall in the prelims.

Wojt currently resides in Frankfurt, Germany, where he trains full-time at EOSC Offenbach under his mother and personal coach Danuta. He is also the grandson of Marek Petrusewicz, a breaststroke swimmer who competed at the 1952 Summer Olympics in Helsinki, Finland.
