= Swimming at the 2001 World Aquatics Championships – Men's 200 metre freestyle =

Men's 200-metre freestyle at the 2001 FINA World Championships
- Dates: 24 July 2001 (heats, semifinals); 25 July 2001 (final)
- Competitors: 55
- Winning time: 1:44.06 WR

Medalists
gold medal	Ian Thorpe	Australia
silver medal	Pieter van den Hoogenband	Netherlands
bronze medal	Klete Keller	United States

The men's 200-metre freestyle event at the 2001 World Aquatic Championships took place 25 July. The heats and semifinals were on 24 July.

== Records ==
Prior to the competition, the existing world and championship records were as follows.

World record	Ian Thorpe (AUS)	1:44.69	Hobart, Australia	27 March 2001
Championship record	Giorgio Lamberti (ITA)	1:47.27	Perth, Australia	7 January 1991

The following record was established during the competition:

Date	Round	Name	Nationality	Time	Record
24 July	Heat 6	Pieter van den Hoogenband	Netherlands	1:47.18	CR
24 July	Semifinal 2	Pieter van den Hoogenband	Netherlands	1:45.80	CR
25 July	Final	Ian Thorpe	Australia	1:44.06	WR

== Results ==
=== Heats ===
Rank	Swimmer	Nation	Time	Notes
1	Pieter van den Hoogenband	Netherlands	1:47.18	Q, CR
2	Emiliano Brembilla	Italy	1:47.91	Q
3	Ian Thorpe	Australia	1:47.95	Q
4	Bill Kirby	Australia	1:48.57	Q
5	Massimiliano Rosolino	Italy	1:48.60	Q
6	Scott Goldblatt	United States	1:48.65	Q
7	Klete Keller	United States	1:49.14	Q
8	Mark Johnston	Canada	1:49.38	Q
9	Paul Palmer	United Kingdom	1:49.46	Q
10	Stefan Herbst	Germany	1:49.72	Q
11	José Meolans	Argentina	1:49.86	Q
12	Athanasios Oikonomou	Greece	1:49.90	Q
13	Květoslav Svoboda	Czech Republic	1:50.02	Q
14	Rick Say	Canada	1:50.08	Q
15	Stefan Pohl	Germany	1:50.11	Q
16	Jacob Carstensen	Denmark	1:50.16	Q
17	Attila Zubor	Hungary	1:50.33	
18	Daisuke Hosokawa	Japan	1:50.36	
19	Stepan Ganzey	Russia	1:50.45	
20	George Bovell	Trinidad and Tobago	1:50.72	
21	Dmitry Chernyshyov	Russia	1:50.77	
22	Rodrigo Castro	Brazil	1:51.10	
23	Hideaki Hara	Japan	1:51.23	
24	Karel Novy	Switzerland	1:52.21	
25	Saulius Binevičius	Lithuania	1:52.56	
26	Han Kyu-Chul	South Korea	1:52.69	
27	Andriy Serdinov	Ukraine	1:53.38	
28	Javier Díaz	Mexico	1:53.81	
29	Alejandro Siqueiros	Mexico	1:53.82	
30	George Gleason	United States Virgin Islands	1:54.31	
31	Gary Tan	Singapore	1:54.93	
32	Dieung Manggang	Malaysia	1:55.30	
33	Wu Nien-Pin	Chinese Taipei	1:55.88	
34	Victor Rogut	Moldova	1:56.04	
35	Mark Chay	Singapore	1:56.43	
36	Mohammad Naeem Masri	Syria	1:56.97	
37	Ronald Cowen	Bermuda	1:57.34	
38	Jiang Bing-Ru	Chinese Taipei	1:57.72	
39	Thamer Al Shamroukh	Kuwait	1:59.11	
40	Christophee Backisavs	Dominican Republic	1:59.12	
41	Fahad Al Otaibi	Kuwait	1:59.19	
42	Chon Kit Alias Joao Tang	Macau	1:59.84	
43	Vakhtang Beridze	Georgia	1:59.88	
44	Obaid Ahmed Al Jassimi	United Arab Emirates	2:00.64	
45	Ignacio Bengoechea	Chile	2:00.65	
46	Barnsley Albert	Seychelles	2:03.68	
47	Seung Gin Lee	Northern Mariana Islands	2:05.91	
48	Aleksey Bortnikov	Uzbekistan	2:05.99	
49	William Kang	Guam	2:06.11	
50	Mumtaz Ahmad	Pakistan	2:07.85	
51	Dean Palacios	Northern Mariana Islands	2:08.71	
52	Mark Unpingco	Guam	2:08.98	
53	Onan Thom	Guyana	2:11.35	
54	Rony Bakale	Republic of the Congo	2:12.59	
55	Loren Lindborg	Marshall Islands	2:18.80	
–	Gustavo Borges	Brazil	DNS	

=== Semifinals ===
Rank	Swimmer	Nation	Time	Notes
1	Pieter van den Hoogenband	Netherlands	1:45.80	Q, CR
2	Ian Thorpe	Australia	1:47.26	Q
3	Klete Keller	United States	1:47.77	Q
4	Emiliano Brembilla	Italy	1:47.84	Q
5	Scott Goldblatt	United States	1:48.50	Q
6	Bill Kirby	Australia	1:48.88	Q
7	Mark Johnston	Canada	1:48.90	Q
8	Jacob Carstensen	Denmark	1:49.26	Q
9	Květoslav Svoboda	Czech Republic	1:49.30	
10	Paul Palmer	United Kingdom	1:49.32	
11	José Meolans	Argentina	1:49.34	
12	Daisuke Hosokawa	Japan	1:49.73	
13	Stefan Herbst	Germany	1:49.75	
14	Stefan Pohl	Germany	1:49.78	
15	Rick Say	Canada	1:49.80	
16	Athanasios Oikonomou	Greece	1:50.28	

=== Final ===
Rank	Name	Nationality	Time	Notes
1st place, gold medalist(s)	Ian Thorpe	Australia	1:44.06	WR
2nd place, silver medalist(s)	Pieter van den Hoogenband	Netherlands	1:45.81	
3rd place, bronze medalist(s)	Klete Keller	United States	1:47.10	
4	Emiliano Brembilla	Italy	1:47.58	
5	William Kirby	Australia	1:48.11	
6	Jacob Carstensen	Denmark	1:48.86	
7	Mark Johnston	Canada	1:49.39	
8	Scott Goldblatt	United States	1:49.54	

Key: WR = World record
