= Yahor Salabutau =

Belarusian swimmer

Personal information
- Full name: Yahor Aliaksandravich Salabutau
- National team: Belarus
- Born: 24 January 1984 (age 42) Minsk, Belarusian SSR, Soviet Union
- Height: 1.80 m (5 ft 11 in)
- Weight: 70 kg (154 lb)

Sport
- Sport: Swimming
- Strokes: Freestyle

Yahor Aliaksandravich Salabutau (Belarusian: Ягор Аляксандравіч Салабутаў, Russian: Егор Александрович Салобутов; born January 24, 1984) is a Belarusian former swimmer, who specialized in freestyle events. Salabutau qualified for the men's 200 m freestyle at the 2004 Summer Olympics in Athens, by clearing a FINA B-standard entry time of 1:51.23 from the Belarus Open Championships in Minsk. He challenged seven other swimmers on the fourth heat, including two-time Olympians Joshua Ilika Brenner of Mexico and Giancarlo Zolezzi of Chile. He raced to sixth place by three hundredths of a second (0.03) behind Algeria's Mahrez Mebarek in 1:53.03. Salabutau failed to advance into the semifinals, as he placed thirty-seventh overall in the preliminaries.
