= Aytekin Mindan =

Turkish swimmer

Personal information
- National team: Turkey
- Born: 31 March 1981 (age 45)
- Height: 1.93 m (6 ft 4 in)
- Weight: 70 kg (154 lb)

Sport
- Sport: Swimming
- Strokes: Freestyle
- Club: İstanbul Yuzme Ihtisas Club

Aytekin Mindan (born 31 March 1981) is a Turkish former swimmer, who specialized in freestyle events. He held a Turkish record of 1:50.40 in the 200 m freestyle, until it was matched by Kemal Arda Gurdal in 2012. He studied at Istanbul Bilgi University.

Mindan made his official debut at the 2000 Summer Olympics in Sydney. He failed to advance into the succeeding rounds in any of his individual events, finishing forty-second in the 200 m freestyle (1:54.86), and thirty-ninth in the 400 m freestyle (4:01.46).

At the 2004 Summer Olympics in Athens, Mindan maintained his program by qualifying for two swimming events. He cleared FINA B-standard entry times of 1:51.14 (200 m freestyle) and 4:00.41 (400 m freestyle) from the Turkish Open Senior Championships in İzmir. On the first day of the Games, Zolezzi placed forty-first in the 400 m freestyle. Swimming in heat two, Mindan rounded out the field of seven swimmers to last place by a 10.33-second margin behind winner Giancarlo Zolezzi in 4:06.85. In his second event, 200 m freestyle, Mindan fell again to last place in heat four and fifty-second overall by 1.84 seconds behind Philippines' Miguel Molina with a time of 1:55.65.
