= Łukasz Gąsior =

Polish swimmer (born 1986)

Personal information
- Full name: Łukasz Waldemar Gąsior
- National team: Poland
- Born: 14 January 1986 (age 40) Łowicz, Poland
- Height: 1.87 m (6 ft 2 in)
- Weight: 80 kg (176 lb)

Sport
- Sport: Swimming
- Strokes: Freestyle
- Club: AZS Warszawa
Medal record
Men's swimming
Representing Poland
European Junior Championships
Gold medal – first place	2004 Lisbon	50 m freestyle
Gold medal – first place	2004 Lisbon	100 m freestyle
Bronze medal – third place	2004 Lisbon	200 m freestyle

Łukasz Waldemar Gąsior (born January 14, 1986) is a Polish swimmer, who specialized in middle-distance freestyle events. He represented his nation Poland at the 2008 Summer Olympics, and won a career total of three medals (two golds and one bronze) in a major international competition, spanning the 2004 European Junior Swimming Championships in Lisbon, Portugal.

Gasior competed for the Polish squad in two swimming events at the 2008 Summer Olympics in Beijing. He raced to a sixth-seeded time in 1:48.52 coming to the top-eight final to dip beneath the FINA B-standard (1:48.72) by two tenths of a second (0.2) at the European Championships five months earlier in Eindhoven, Netherlands. In the 200 m freestyle, Gasior rounded out the field to eighth in the last of eight heats with a frustrating 1:49.25, trailing eventual Olympic champion Michael Phelps of the United States and runner-up Park Tae-hwan of South by nearly four seconds, and missing the semifinals with a thirty-fourth place finish from the prelims. Gasior also teamed up with Łukasz Wójt, Michał Rokicki, and Przemysław Stańczyk in the 4 × 200 m freestyle relay. Swimming the lead-off leg, Gasior recorded a split of 1:48.40, and the Polish team went on to finish heat two in seventh place and fourteenth overall with a final time of 7:18.09.
