= Adil Bellaz =

Moroccan swimmer

Personal information
- Full name: Adil Bellaz
- National team: Morocco
- Born: 4 June 1981 (age 45)
- Height: 1.70 m (5 ft 7 in)
- Weight: 78 kg (172 lb)

Sport
- Sport: Swimming
- Strokes: Freestyle

Adil Bellaz (Arabic: عادل بلاز; born June 4, 1981) is a Moroccan former swimmer, who specialized in freestyle events. Bellaz qualified for the men's 200 m freestyle at the 2004 Summer Olympics in Athens, by clearing a FINA B-standard entry time of 1:54.08 from the Vittel Cup in Mulhouse, France. He challenged seven other swimmers in heat two, including dual citizen Mihail Alexandrov of Bulgaria. He raced to sixth place in a time of 1:55.79, more than a second off his entry time. Bellaz failed to advance into the semifinals, as he placed fifty-third overall in the preliminaries.
