= Bradford Worrell =

Saint Lucian swimmer (born 1988)

Personal information
- Born: 1988 (age 37–38)

Sport
- Sport: Swimming
- Strokes: Freestyle, breaststroke

Bradford Worrell (born 1988) is a Saint Lucian swimmer. He competed in several events, including the 50 m, 100 m and 200 m freestyle events at the 2003 World Aquatics Championships and the 50 m, 100 m and 200 m freestyle events at the 2003 World Aquatics Championships. Worrell also competed in the 200 m freestyle event at the 2006 Commonwealth Games.

Six years later, he took part in the 50 m, 50 m and 100 m freestyle events at the 2012 FINA World Swimming Championships (25 m) and in the 50 m and 100 m breaststroke events at the 2013 World Aquatics Championships. Worrell holds several Saint Lucian swimming records, including the long course 200 m event (with a time of 2:03.10, set in 2004), and the short course 200 m (2:01.63; 2004), 400 m freestyle (4:23.75; 2004), 100 m (1:07.65; 2013) and 200 m breaststroke events (2:36.92; 2013).
