= Michał Rokicki =

Polish swimmer (1984–2021)

Personal information
- National team: Poland
- Born: 31 March 1984 Racibórz, Poland
- Died: 20 December 2021 (aged 37) Racibórz, Poland
- Height: 1.88 m (6 ft 2 in)
- Weight: 78 kg (172 lb)

Sport
- Sport: Swimming
- Strokes: Freestyle
- Club: AZS Warszawa
- Coach: Paweł Slominski

Michał Rokicki (31 March 1984 – 20 December 2021) was a Polish swimmer, who specialized in freestyle events. He represented his nation Poland at the 2008 Summer Olympics, and also served as a member of the swimming team throughout his sporting career for AZS Warszawa, under the tutelage of his personal coach Paweł Slominski.

Rokicki competed as a member of the Polish team in the 4 × 200 m freestyle relay at the 2008 Summer Olympics in Beijing. Despite missing out the individual spot in the 200 m freestyle, Rokicki managed to finish with a twenty-sixth-place time in 1:50.12 at the 2007 FINA World Championships in Melbourne, Australia to earn a selection on the Polish relay team for the Games. Teaming with Łukasz Gąsior, Łukasz Wójt, and Przemysław Stańczyk on the outside lane in heat two, Rokicki swam the third leg with a split of 1:51.14, before the Polish foursome went on to take the seventh spot and fourteenth overall in a final time of 7:18.09.

Rokicki died on 20 December 2021, at the age of 37.
