= Zurab Khomasuridze =

Georgian swimmer

Personal information
- Full name: Zurab Khomasuridze
- National team: Georgia
- Born: 22 March 1980 (age 46) Tbilisi, Georgian SSR, Soviet Union
- Height: 1.83 m (6 ft 0 in)
- Weight: 77 kg (170 lb)

Sport
- Sport: Swimming
- Strokes: Freestyle

Zurab Khomasuridze (Georgian: ზურაბ ხომასურიძე; born March 22, 1980) is a Georgian former swimmer, who specialized in freestyle events. He is a multiple-time Georgian swimming champion and record holder in the 200, 400, and 1500 m freestyle.

Khomasuridze qualified for the men's 200 m freestyle at the 2004 Summer Olympics in Athens, by receiving a Universality place from FINA in an invitation time of 1:57.06. He participated in the first heat against two other swimmers Igor Erhartić of Serbia and Montenegro and 14-year-old Ruslan Ismailov of Kyrgyzstan. He saved a second spot over a young Ismailov by a 3.51-second margin in 1:58.02. Khomasuridze failed to advance into the semifinals, as he placed fifty-eighth overall in the preliminaries.

Khomasuridze is currently a head coach for the Georgian swimming team. He also trained with Irakli Revishvili and Irakli Bolkvadze, both of whom succeeded him and later competed at the 2008 and 2012 Summer Olympics, respectively.
