= Dominik Koll =

Austrian swimmer

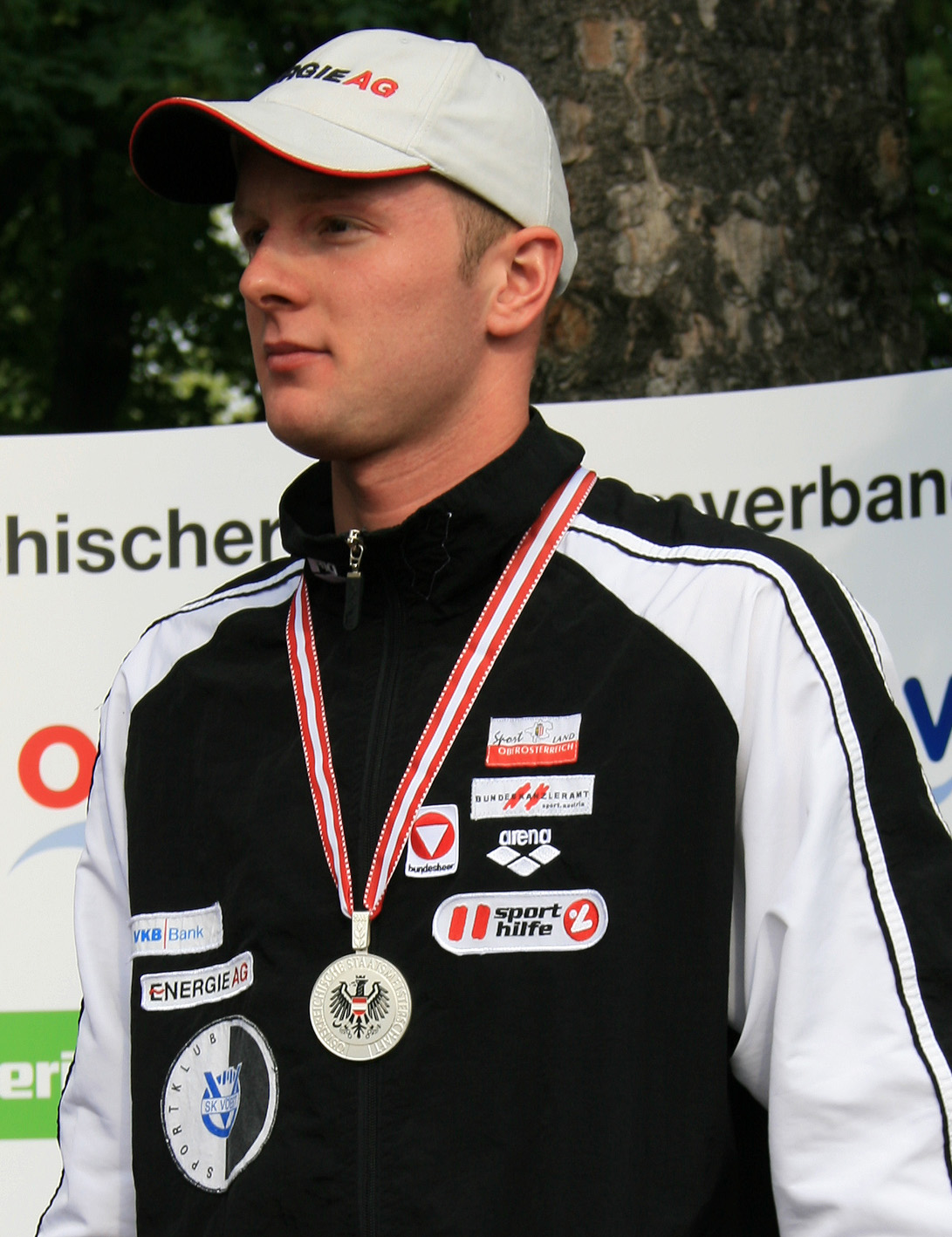

Personal information
- National team: Austria
- Born: 24 December 1984 (age 41) Linz, Austria
- Height: 1.84 m (6 ft 0 in)
- Weight: 70 kg (154 lb)

Sport
- Sport: Swimming
- Strokes: Freestyle
- Club: SK VÖEST Linz
- College team: Columbia University (U.S.)
- Coach: Jim Bolster (U.S.)
Medal record
Men's swimming
Representing Austria
European Championships
Bronze medal – third place	2008 Eindhoven	4×200 m freestyle

Dominik Koll (born 24 December 1984) is an Austrian former swimmer, who specialized in freestyle events. He is a two-time Olympian, a 41-time national titleholder, and a 5-time long and short course Austrian record holder. Koll is a member of the swimming team for SK VÖEST Linz. He won a bronze medal, as a member of the Austrian swimming team, at the 2008 European Championships in Eindhoven, Netherlands. Koll is one of few LGBT Olympians to come out as gay.

== Swimming career ==
Koll made his Olympic debut at the 2004 Summer Olympics in Athens, competing in the men's 200 m freestyle. Koll cruised to fourth place in his heat and twenty-fifth overall by 0.53 of a second behind Latvia's Romāns Miloslavskis in 1:51.36.

Four years after competing in his first Olympics, Koll qualified for his second Austrian team at the 2008 Summer Olympics in Beijing. As a 23-year old, he swam a FINA A-cut time of 1:48.21 at the European Championships in Eindhoven, Netherlands. At the 2008 Summer Olympics in Beijing, Koll set a new Austrian mark in the 200 m freestyle and recorded the sixteenth fastest time of 1:47.81 on the second night of preliminaries to secure the final spot in the semifinals. The following morning, Koll failed to qualify for the final, as he finished his semifinal run with a fourth-slowest time of 1:47.87, just 0.06 of a second off his record from the preliminaries.

Two days later, Koll swam the start-off leg of the men's 4×200 m freestyle relay, recording his individual-split time of 1:47.72. Koll and his teammates David Brandl, Markus Rogan, and Florian Janistyn finished the second heat in fifth place and ninth overall, for another national record-breaking time of 7:11.45.

Shortly after the Olympics, Koll set another national record in the 400 m freestyle at the 2008 European Short Course Swimming Championships, with a time of 3:39.82. The following year, he posted his fifth-career Austrian record time of 1:43.90 by finishing eighth in the preliminary heats of the men's 200 m freestyle at the European Short Course Swimming Championships in Istanbul, Turkey.

Koll is a current member of the swimming team for Columbia Lions, and a film and economics major at Columbia University in New York, New York.
