= Pieter van den Hoogenband =

Dutch swimmer

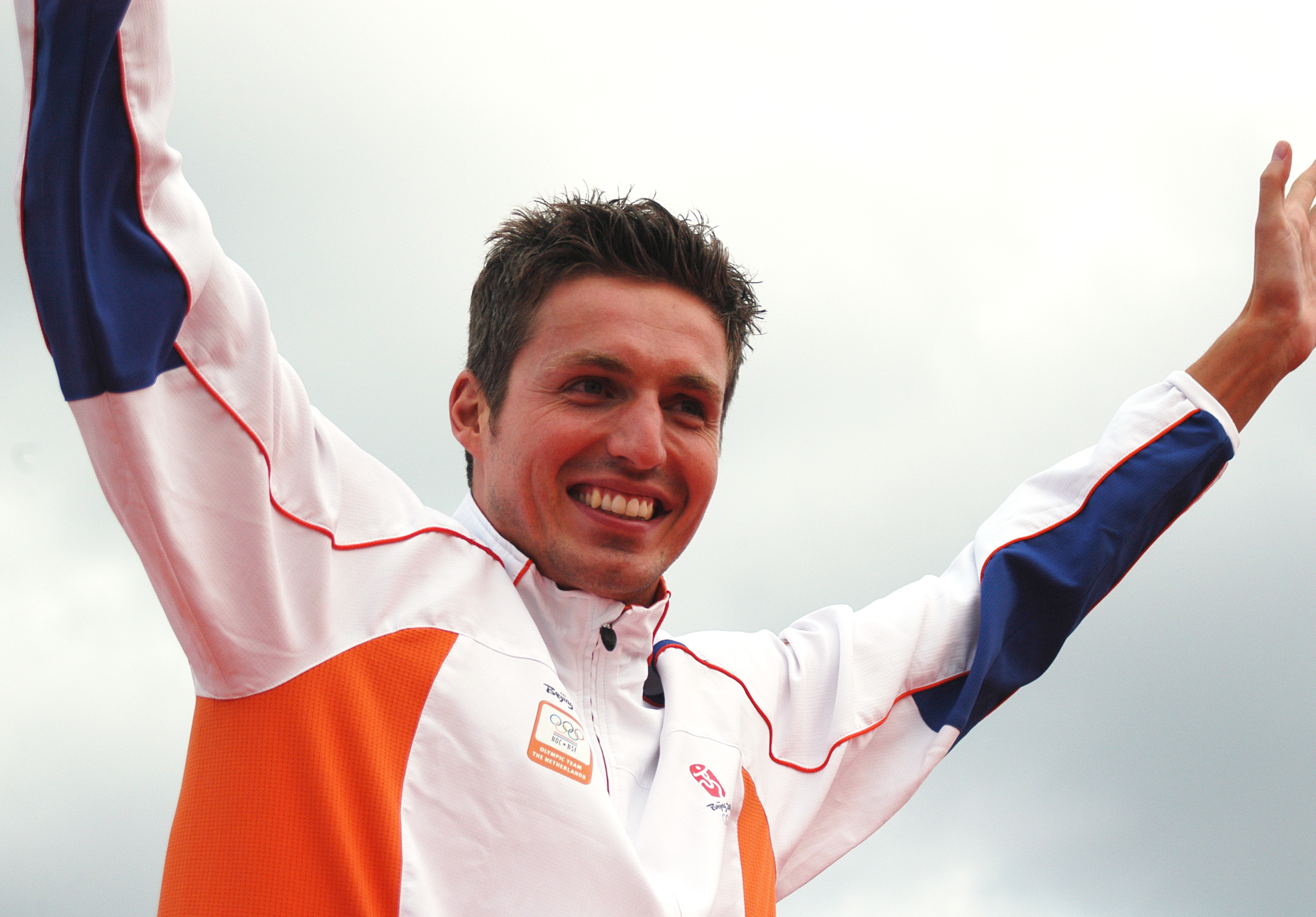
- Van den Hoogenband in 2008

Personal information
- Full name: Pieter Cornelis Martijn van den Hoogenband
- Nicknames: The Flying Dutchman; The Dutch Dolphin; Hoogie; VDH
- Nationality: Netherlands
- Born: 14 March 1978 (age 48) Maastricht, Netherlands
- Height: 1.93 m (6 ft 4 in)
- Weight: 80 kg (176 lb)

Sport
- Sport: Swimming
- Strokes: Freestyle
Medal record
Men's swimming
Representing the Netherlands
Event	1st	2nd	3rd
Olympic Games	3	2	2
World Championships (LC)	0	8	2
World Championships (SC)	1	1	1
Goodwill Games	2	0	2
European Championships (LC)	10	5	4
European Championships (SC)	8	4	3
Total	24	20	14
Olympic Games
Gold medal – first place	2000 Sydney	100 m freestyle
Gold medal – first place	2000 Sydney	200 m freestyle
Gold medal – first place	2004 Athens	100 m freestyle
Silver medal – second place	2004 Athens	200 m freestyle
Silver medal – second place	2004 Athens	4×100 m freestyle
Bronze medal – third place	2000 Sydney	50 m freestyle
Bronze medal – third place	2000 Sydney	4×200 m freestyle
World Championships (LC)
Silver medal – second place	1998 Perth	4×200 m freestyle
Silver medal – second place	2001 Fukuoka	50 m freestyle
Silver medal – second place	2001 Fukuoka	100 m freestyle
Silver medal – second place	2001 Fukuoka	200 m freestyle
Silver medal – second place	2001 Fukuoka	4×100 m freestyle
Silver medal – second place	2003 Barcelona	100 m freestyle
Silver medal – second place	2003 Barcelona	200 m freestyle
Silver medal – second place	2007 Melbourne	200 m freestyle
Bronze medal – third place	1998 Perth	200 m freestyle
Bronze medal – third place	2003 Barcelona	50 m freestyle
World Championships (SC)
Gold medal – first place	1999 Hong Kong	4×200 m freestyle
Silver medal – second place	1999 Hong Kong	4×100 m freestyle
Bronze medal – third place	1999 Hong Kong	200 m freestyle
Goodwill Games
Gold medal – first place	1998 New York	200 m freestyle
Gold medal – first place	1998 New York	4×100 m freestyle
Bronze medal – third place	1998 New York	100 m freestyle
Bronze medal – third place	2001 Brisbane	4×100 m medley
European Championships (LC)
Gold medal – first place	1999 Istanbul	50 m freestyle
Gold medal – first place	1999 Istanbul	100 m freestyle
Gold medal – first place	1999 Istanbul	200 m freestyle
Gold medal – first place	1999 Istanbul	50 m butterfly
Gold medal – first place	1999 Istanbul	4×100 m freestyle
Gold medal – first place	1999 Istanbul	4×100 m medley
Gold medal – first place	2002 Berlin	100 m freestyle
Gold medal – first place	2002 Berlin	200 m freestyle
Gold medal – first place	2004 Madrid	200 m freestyle
Gold medal – first place	2006 Budapest	200 m freestyle
Silver medal – second place	1997 Seville	4×200 m freestyle
Silver medal – second place	2000 Helsinki	50 m freestyle
Silver medal – second place	2000 Helsinki	100 m freestyle
Silver medal – second place	2000 Helsinki	200 m freestyle
Silver medal – second place	2004 Madrid	100 m freestyle
Bronze medal – third place	1997 Seville	4×100 m freestyle
Bronze medal – third place	2000 Helsinki	4×200 m freestyle
Bronze medal – third place	2006 Budapest	100 m freestyle
Bronze medal – third place	2008 Eindhoven	4×100 m freestyle
European Championships (SC)
Gold medal – first place	1998 Sheffield	200 m freestyle
Gold medal – first place	1998 Sheffield	4×50 m freestyle
Gold medal – first place	1999 Lisbon	100 m freestyle
Gold medal – first place	1999 Lisbon	200 m freestyle
Gold medal – first place	2001 Antwerp	200 m freestyle
Gold medal – first place	2003 Dublin	100 m freestyle
Gold medal – first place	2003 Dublin	200 m freestyle
Gold medal – first place	2003 Dublin	4×50 m freestyle
Silver medal – second place	1998 Sheffield	100 m freestyle
Silver medal – second place	1999 Lisbon	50 m freestyle
Silver medal – second place	2001 Antwerp	100 m freestyle
Silver medal – second place	2001 Antwerp	4×50 m freestyle
Bronze medal – third place	1998 Sheffield	50 m freestyle
Bronze medal – third place	1999 Lisbon	4×50 m freestyle
Bronze medal – third place	2001 Antwerp	50 m freestyle

Pieter Cornelis Martijn van den Hoogenband (Dutch pronunciation: [ˈpitər vɑn də(n) ˈɦoːɣə(m)ˌbɑnt]; born 14 March 1978) is a Dutch retired swimmer. He is a triple Olympic champion and former world record holder.

== Early life ==
Born in Maastricht, Limburg, he is the first child of Cees-Rein van den Hoogenband and Astrid Verver, a former Dutch 800 m freestyle silver medalist at the European Junior Championships. He has a younger sister named Veronique and a younger brother named Robert.

He grew up in Geldrop, where he swam for PSV. His father, a former judoka, was a team doctor with the professional football team of the same club.

Russian swimmer and four-time Olympic gold medalist Alexander Popov was his role model.

== Swimming career ==
=== Early career ===
In 1993, Van den Hoogenband achieved his first success, performing well on the European Youth Olympic Days. Before the Atlanta Games, Astrid van den Hoogenband, who was coaching the Dutch team, became frustrated with the swimmers representing the Netherlands, feeling they had much potential but would not be able to live up to it due to lack of adequate support. She pleaded with Cees to take action, as he carried much weight through his professional connections. After Astrid threatened to remove Pieter from the sport, Cees created a small foundation and signed up 20 initial sponsors who each paid $2,500 to fund a team trainer. The Dutch swimming team eventually signed contracts with Philips, Nike, and Speedo. Enough funds were raised to open a swim school in Eindhoven, Van den Hoogenband's place of residence. The team eventually grew to ten.

Van den Hoogenband is the only swimmer in history who has managed to win both the 100–200 metre freestyle double at the Olympics and also repeat as 100 freestyle champion at the Olympics. His three Olympic gold medals are the only three won by a Dutch male pool swimmer.

==== 1996 Olympics ====
Van den Hoogenband's international breakthrough came at the 1996 Summer Olympics in Atlanta. Only 18 years old, he exceeded the expectations of many by finishing 4th in both the 100 m and 200 m freestyle. He won the 50 m freestyle B final, and finished 5th in the 4×100 m freestyle relay, 7th in the 4×200 m freestyle relay, and 10th in the 4×100 m medley relay.

=== Later career ===
==== 1998 World championships ====
1998 World Championships
Silver medal – second place	4×200 m freestyle	7:16.77
Bronze medal – third place	200 m freestyle	1:48.65

At the 1998 World Aquatics Championships in Perth, Australia, Van den Hoogenband won bronze medal in the 200 metre freestyle and silver in the 4×200 m freestyle relay.

==== 2000 Olympics ====
2000 Summer Olympics
Gold medal – first place	100 m freestyle	48.30
Gold medal – first place	200 m freestyle	1:45.35
Bronze medal – third place	50 m freestyle	22.03
Bronze medal – third place	4×200 m freestyle	7:12.70

After winning 6 gold medals at the 1999 European Championships, Van den Hoogenband was one of the favourites at the 2000 Summer Olympics, but his adversaries were formidable. In the 200 m freestyle he faced the world record holder, Australian youngster Ian Thorpe, favourite of the home crowd in Sydney. In the semi-finals, Van den Hoogenband set a new world record, but Thorpe countered with a time only 0.02 s slower. In an exciting final, Van den Hoogenband equalled his time from the semi-finals to win the gold medal. In the 100 m freestyle, Van den Hoogenband again set a world record in the semi-finals and won his second gold medal, defeating the 1992 and 1996 champion, Alexander Popov. His 100 m world record stood until 21 March 2008 and was broken by France's Alain Bernard (47.60). Van den Hoogenband won two more medals, both bronze, in the 50 m freestyle and the 4×200 m freestyle relay, in which he was the final swimmer.

Van den Hoogenband was named Dutch sportsman of the year in 1999, 2000 and 2004, World Swimmer of the Year in 2000, and European Swimmer of the Year in 1999, 2000, 2002 and 2004.

==== 2001 World championships ====
2001 World Championships
Silver medal – second place	50 m freestyle	22.16
Silver medal – second place	100 m freestyle	48.43
Silver medal – second place	200 m freestyle	1:45.81
Silver medal – second place	4×100 m freestyle	3:14.56

At the 2001 World Championships in Fukuoka, Japan, Van den Hoogenband won four silver medals in the 50 m, 100 m, 200 m freestyle events and 4×100 m freestyle relay.

==== 2003 World Championships ====
2003 World Championships
Silver medal – second place	100 m freestyle	48.68
Silver medal – second place	200 m freestyle	1:46.43
Bronze medal – third place	50 m freestyle	22.29

At the 2003 World Championships in Barcelona he split a 46.70 in the medley relay which stood as the fastest 100 m freestyle split until it was topped in 2008 by the French relay veteran Frédérick Bousquet, at 46.63 seconds. Van den Hoogenbands' 46.70, however, remained as the fastest textile relay split until it was topped in 2015 by Cameron McEvoy of Australia. He had disappointing performances in both the 100 and 200 freestyle events though, finishing runner up to Alexander Popov and Ian Thorpe respectively, with considerably slow times. His times from previous meets in the past year, and earlier rounds of the championships, would have won both events. His winning time in the 200 freestyle at the 2002 European Championships was faster than Ian Thorpe's winning time at these Championships, but Pieter went about 2 whole seconds slower this time around. His time in the semis of the 100 freestyle at these Championships would have won the final of that event as well (won by Alexander Popov), and his 100 free relay split (with nearly a second gain from a rolling start) was 2 whole seconds faster.

==== 2004 Olympics ====
2004 Summer Olympics
Gold medal – first place	100 m freestyle	48.17
Silver medal – second place	200 m freestyle	1:45.23
Silver medal – second place	4×100 m freestyle	3:14.36

At the 2004 Summer Olympics in Athens, he won a gold medal in the 100 m freestyle and two silvers in the 200 m freestyle and the 4 × 100 m freestyle relay, swimming the anchor leg in 46.79 which was the 2nd fastest split in history. By finishing ahead of Michael Phelps in both the 200 m freestyle and the 4×100 m freestyle relay, he is the only swimmer to ever beat Phelps twice in Olympic competition. While technically the second was a relay, his split was faster by a large margin, and the margin of beating the U.S. team by a far smaller one.

==== 2007 World Championships ====
At the 2007 World Championships in Melbourne, Australia, Van den Hoogenband won a silver medal in the 200 m freestyle behind Michael Phelps.

He holds by a large margin the all-time record for most runner up finishes at the World Championships without winning.

==== 2008 Olympics ====
Van den Hoogenband returned to the Olympic Games in 2008 in Beijing and finished fifth in the 100 m freestyle. He retired after the race. In the semifinals he broke his own national record that stood from the 2000 Summer Olympics, bringing it to 47.68 s.

In making the 100 m freestyle final, Van den Hoogenband became the first swimmer to make the finals in the same event four times.

In December of the same year, he announced his retirement.

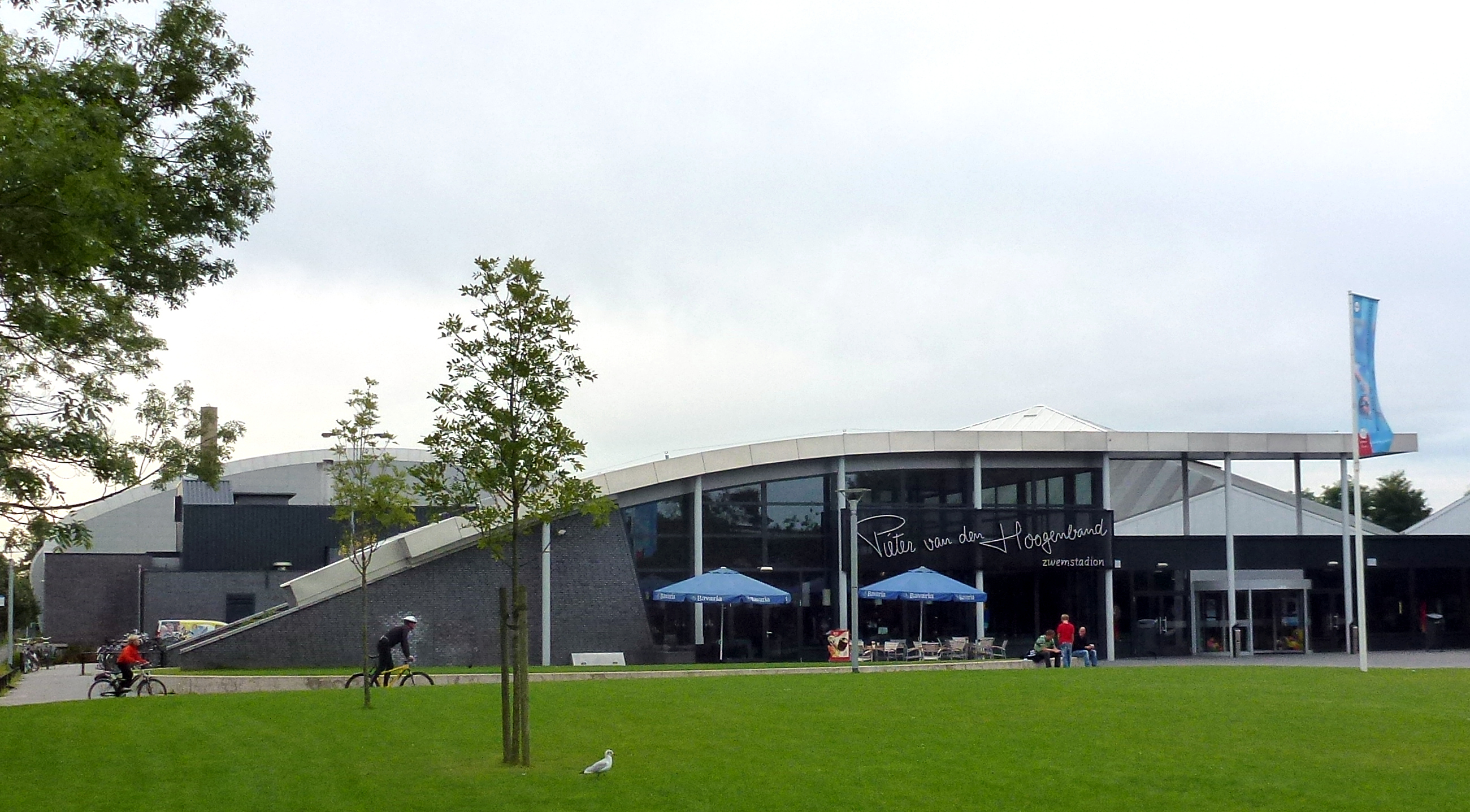
Pieter van den Hoogenband Zwemstadion in Eindhoven

== Post-swimming career ==
Van den Hoogenband continues to swim recreationally and he remains active in the sports industry. He has served as a commentator for many swimming events, including the 2012 Summer Olympics. The swimming arena in the sporting centre of Eindhoven was named the "Pieter van den Hoogenband Zwemstadion".

Van den Hoogenband was the Chef de mission for the 2024 Netherlands Olympic team. In July 2024 he said he was surprised by the fuss surrounding beach volleyball player Steven van de Velde despite the fact van de Velde pleaded guilty to three counts of child rape in 2016.

== Personal life ==
Van den Hoogenband was married to his longtime girlfriend Minouche Smit who is also a former swimmer. They have two children. In September 2012 the couple announced their divorce. Then Van den Hoogenband dated Ranomi Kromowidjojo, also a multiple Olympic gold medalist. Their relationship ended in 2014. On 16 September 2016 Van den Hoogenband married Marie-José Crooijmans.

Despite a fierce rivalry, Van den Hoogenband is a good friend of Australian Olympic swimmer Ian Thorpe.

== See also ==
- Dutch records in swimming
- List of multiple Olympic medalists at a single Games

Records
Preceded by Michael Klim	Men's 100 metre freestyle world record holder (long course); 19 September 2000 – 21 March 2008	Succeeded by Alain Bernard
Preceded by Ian Thorpe	Men's 200 metre freestyle world record holder (long course); 17 September 2000 – 27 March 2001	Succeeded by Ian Thorpe
Awards and achievements
Preceded by Gianni Romme	Dutch Sportsman of the Year; 1999 to 2000	Succeeded by Erik Dekker
Preceded by Erben Wennemars	Dutch Sportsman of the Year; 2004	Succeeded by Yuri van Gelder
Preceded by Ian Thorpe	World Swimmer of the Year; 2000	Succeeded by Ian Thorpe
Preceded by Denys Sylantyev	European Swimmer of the Year; 1999–2000	Succeeded by Roman Sloudnov
Preceded by Roman Sloudnov	European Swimmer of the Year; 2002	Succeeded by Alexander Popov
Preceded by Alexander Popov	European Swimmer of the Year; 2004	Succeeded by László Cseh
