= Irakli Revishvili =

Georgian swimmer

Personal information
- Full name: Irakli Revishvili
- Nickname: Revisha
- National team: Georgia
- Born: 3 November 1988 (age 37) Tbilisi, Georgian SSR, Soviet Union
- Height: 1.79 m (5 ft 10 in)
- Weight: 74 kg (163 lb)

Sport
- Sport: Swimming
- Strokes: Freestyle
- Coach: Zurab Khomasuridze

Irakli Revishvili (Georgian: ირაკლი რევიშვილი; born 3 November 1988) is a Georgian swimmer, who specialized in freestyle events. He represented his nation Georgia at the 2008 Summer Olympics, and holds two Georgian national records in both the 200 and 400 m freestyle. Revishvili also trained for the national swimming team under the tutelage of head coach and 2004 Olympian Zurab Khomasuridze.

Revishvili received a card invitation from FINA to compete as a lone Georgian male swimmer in the 200 m freestyle at the 2008 Summer Olympics in Beijing. He pulled away from a small field of swimmers to take victory in the opening heat with 1:53.60, but failed to advance further to the semifinals, finishing fifty-third overall in the prelims.
