= Igor Erhartić =

Serbian swimmer (born 1984)

Personal information
- Born: January 29, 1984 (age 42) Novi Sad, SR Serbia, SFR Yugoslavia

Sport
- Sport: Swimming

Igor Erhartić (Serbian Cyrillic: Игор Ерхартић; born January 29, 1984) is a Serbian swimmer.

Erhartić represented Serbia and Montenegro at the 2004 Summer Olympics. He participated in one single event, the men's 200 metre freestyle, in which he took 48th place overall among 59 competitors with a time of 1:54.21.
