= Andrei Zaharov =

Moldovan swimmer

Personal information
- Full name: Andrei Zaharov
- National team: Moldova
- Born: 10 October 1975 (age 50) Chişinău, Moldavian SSR, Soviet Union
- Height: 1.89 m (6 ft 2 in)
- Weight: 75 kg (165 lb)

Sport
- Sport: Swimming
- Strokes: Freestyle, medley
- Club: Moldova Swimming Team

Andrei Zaharov (born October 10, 1975) is a Moldovan former swimmer, who specialized in freestyle and individual medley events. Zaharov represented Moldova at four Olympics (1996 in Atlanta, 2000 in Sydney, 2004 in Athens, and 2008 in Beijing).

Zaharov also became one of the five swimmers to represent Moldova at his nation's first Olympics in Atlanta, since it gained independence from the former Soviet Union in 1991. He competed for the 200 m and 400 m freestyle events, where he set a national record and produced fair results in each event. Zaharov continued his quest at the Olympics, when he qualified for the 200 m individual medley, placing forty-seventh in Sydney, and thirty-ninth in Athens. For his fourth Olympics in Beijing, Zaharov decided to compete for the men's 200 m freestyle event, through a wild card place. He swam in the second heat of the event, finishing only in last place and fifty-sixth overall, with a time of 1:58.62.
