= Mahrez Mebarek =

Algerian swimmer (born 1985)

Personal information
- Full name: Mahrez Mebarek
- National team: Algeria
- Born: 11 February 1985 (age 41) Aflou, Algeria
- Height: 1.83 m (6 ft 0 in)
- Weight: 90 kg (198 lb)

Sport
- Sport: Swimming
- Strokes: Freestyle

Mahrez Mebarek (Arabic: محرز مبارك; born February 11, 1985) is an Algerian former swimmer, who specialized in freestyle events. He is a multiple-time Algerian record holder in long-distance freestyle (400, 800, and 1500 m).

Mebarek made his official debut at the 2004 Summer Olympics in Athens, where he qualified for two swimming events. In the 400 m freestyle, he challenged seven other swimmers on the third heat, where South Korea's Park Tae-Hwan was disqualified for a false start. Mebarek edged out Slovenia's Bojan Zdešar to take a fourth spot and dip under a 4-minute barrier by 0.90 of a second in 3:59.10. In his second event, 200 m freestyle, Mebarek shared a thirty-fifth place tie with Macedonia's Aleksandar Malenko in the preliminaries with a time of 1:53.00.

At the 2008 Summer Olympics in Beijing, Mebarek qualified for the second time in the men's 200 m freestyle by eclipsing a FINA B-standard entry time of 1:52.03 from the EDF Swimming Open in Paris, France. He challenged six other swimmers on the second heat, including four-time Olympian Andrei Zaharov of Moldova. He edged out Kazakhstan's Artur Dilman to take a third spot by 0.24 of a second, posting his lifetime best of 1:52.66. Mebarek failed to advance into the semifinals, as he placed fifty-first overall in the preliminaries.
