= Emanuele Nicolini =

Sammarinese swimmer

Personal information
- Full name: Emanuele Nicolini
- National team: San Marino
- Born: 20 April 1984 (age 42) Borgo Maggiore, San Marino
- Height: 1.77 m (5 ft 10 in)
- Weight: 70 kg (154 lb)

Sport
- Sport: Swimming
- Strokes: Freestyle

Emanuele Nicolini (born April 20, 1984) is a Sammarinese swimmer, who specialized in freestyle events. He holds numerous national records in the 200 and 400 m freestyle, and had represented his nation San Marino in two editions of the Olympic Games (2004 and 2008).

Nicolini made his first Sammarinese team at the 2004 Summer Olympics in Athens, where he competed in the men's 400 m freestyle. Swimming in heat one, he came home strongly at the final stretch to post a third-place time and forty-second overall in 4:08.28, just seven seconds behind the winner Miguel Mendoza of the Philippines.

At the 2008 Summer Olympics in Beijing, Nicolini swam the first heat of the 200 m freestyle, against Georgia's Irakli Revishvili and Macedonia's Mihajlo Ristovski. He closed out a small field to last place with the slowest prelims time of 1:59.47, finishing two seconds behind the winner Ristovski. Nicolini, however, failed to advance into the semifinals, as he placed fifty-seventh in the overall rankings.
