= Max Schnettler =

Chilean swimmer (born 1986)

Personal information
- Full name: Maximiliano Schnettler Ramírez
- Nickname: "Max"
- Nationality: Chile
- Born: January 30, 1986 (age 40)
- Height: 1.91 m (6 ft 3 in)
- Weight: 83 kg (183 lb)

Sport
- Sport: Swimming
- Strokes: Freestyle
Medal record
Representing Chile
South American Games
Gold medal – first place	2002 Belem	200m freestyle
Silver medal – second place	2002 Belem	100m freestyle
Silver medal – second place	2006 Buenos Aires	4x200m freestyle relay

Maximiliano "Max" Schnettler Ramírez (Note: In this Spanish name, the first or paternal surname is Schnettler and the second or maternal family name is Ramírez.) (born January 30, 1986) is a male freestyle swimmer from Chile. He competed for his native South American country at the 2004 Summer Olympics, and also swam at the 2003 Pan American Games.
