= Tiago Venâncio =

Portuguese swimmer

Personal information
- Full name: Tiago André Venâncio
- Nationality: Portuguese
- Born: 19 July 1987 (age 38) Setúbal, Portugal
- Height: 1.92 m (6 ft 4 in)
- Weight: 87 kg (192 lb)

Sport
- Sport: Swimming
- Strokes: freestyle
- Club: CN Setubalense

Tiago André Venâncio (born 19 July 1987) is a Portuguese freestyle swimmer. He competed at the 2004, 2008 and 2012 Summer Olympics in the individual 100 m and 200 m events with the best result of 26th place in 2004.
