= Maksim Kuznetsov (swimmer) =

Russian swimmer

Personal information
- Born: April 5, 1982 (age 44)

Sport
- Sport: Swimming
Medal record
Representing Russia
Summer Universiade
Gold medal – first place	2003 Daegu	4x200m freestyle relay
European Championships
Silver medal – second place	2004 Moscow	4x200m freestyle relay

Maksim Kuznetsov (born 5 April 1982) is a Russian former swimmer who competed in the 2004 Summer Olympics.
