= Olaf Wildeboer =

Dutch swimmer

Personal information
- Full name: Olaf Wildeboer Faber
- Nationality: Spain (pre-2006); Netherlands (2006- )
- Born: 4 March 1983 (age 43) Sabadell, Catalonia, Spain

Sport
- Sport: Swimming
- Strokes: Freesylte
Medal record
Men's swimming
Representing Spain
Mediterranean Games
Silver medal – second place	2005 Almería	200 m freestyle
Silver medal – second place	2005 Almería	4x100 m freestyle

Olaf Wildeboer Faber (Note: In this Spanish name, the first or paternal surname is Wildeboer and the second or maternal family name is Faber.) (born 4 March 1983 in Sabadell, Catalonia, Spain) is a freestyle swimmer of Dutch origin. His parents, both born and raised in the Netherlands, moved to Spain in 1978, and settled in Sabadell. His brother is Aschwin Wildeboer.

Wildeboer competed for Spain at the 2004 Summer Olympics. He won two silver medals at the 2005 Mediterranean Games.

== See also ==
- List of Spanish records in swimming
