= Shai Livnat =

Israeli swimmer

Shai Livnat שי לבנת
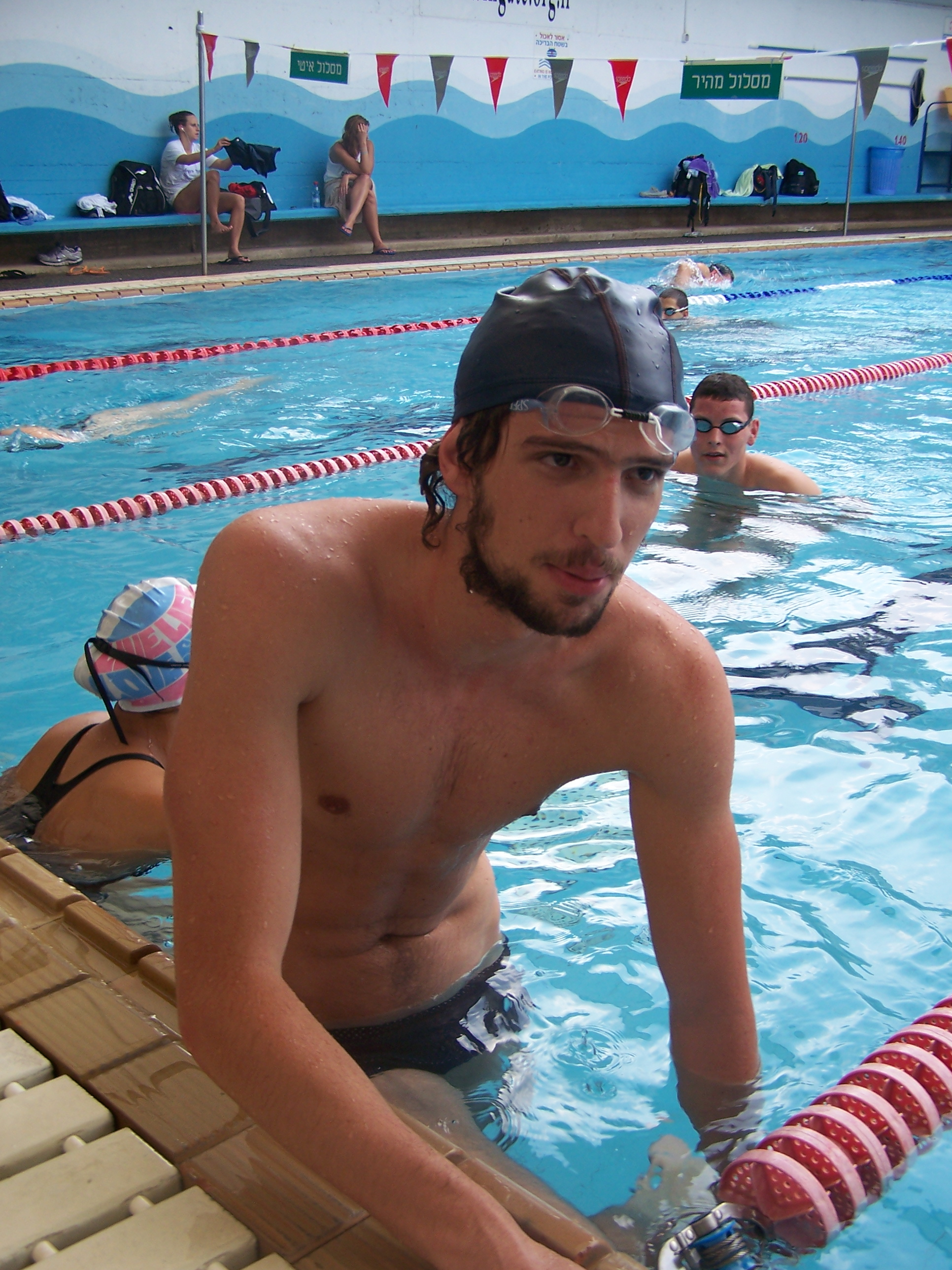

Personal information
- Full name: Shai Livnat
- Nationality: Israeli
- Born: 1984 (age 41–42) Haifa

Sport
- Sport: Swimming
Medal record
Maccabiah Games
Gold medal – first place	2005 Israel	200m freestyle
Silver medal – second place	2005 Israel	100m freestyle
Silver medal – second place	2005 Israel	400m freestyle

Shai Livnat (Hebrew: שי לבנת) is an Israeli swimmer who has represented Israel at numerous international competitions such as the 2006 LEN European Championships and holds the Israeli record for the 400m free as well as the Maccabiah record in the 200m free.
