= Giancarlo Zolezzi =

Chilean swimmer (born 1981)

Personal information
- Full name: Giancarlo Zolezzi Seoane
- National team: Chile
- Born: 27 August 1981 (age 45) Santiago, Chile
- Height: 1.95 m (6 ft 5 in)
- Weight: 110 kg (243 lb)

Sport
- Sport: Swimming
- Strokes: Freestyle
- Club: ya no el stadio

Giancarlo Zolezzi Seoane (born August 27, 1981) is a Chilean former swimmer, who specialized in long-distance freestyle events. He is a multiple-time Chilean swimming champion and record holder in the 200, 400, 800, and 1500 m freestyle.

Zolezzi made his official debut at the 2000 Summer Olympics in Sydney, where he competed in the 400 m freestyle. Swimming in heat one, he raced to second place and fortieth overall by 0.17 of a second behind Singapore's Sng Ju Wei in 4:01.51.

At the 2004 Summer Olympics in Athens, Zolezzi extended his program, swimming in three individual events. He posted FINA B-standard entry times of 1:52.47 (200 m freestyle), 3:57.89 (400 m freestyle), and 15:55.89 (1500 m freestyle) from the Pan American Games in Santo Domingo, Dominican Republic, and World Championships in Barcelona, Spain. On the first day of the Games, Zolezzi placed twenty-fifth in the 400 m freestyle. He blasted a new Chilean record of 3:56.52 to top the second heat against seven other swimmers, including early favorites Moss Burmester of New Zealand and Petar Stoychev of Bulgaria.

By the following day, Zolezzi took a sixth spot and thirty-ninth overall in heat four of the 200 m freestyle. He posted a time of 1:53.18, just 0.71 of a second off his entry and record time. In the 1500 m freestyle, Zolezzi touched second in heat one behind Thailand's Charnvudth Saengsri by a 6.06-second margin in 16:00.52. Zolezzi failed to advance into the final, as he placed primerisimo overall in the preliminaries.
