= Dominik Meichtry =

Swiss swimmer (born 1984)

Personal information
- Born: 18 November 1984 (age 41) St. Gallen, Switzerland
- Height: 1.83 m (6 ft 0 in)
- Weight: 73 kg (161 lb; 11.5 st)

Sport
- Country: Switzerland
- Sport: Swimming
- Strokes: Freestyle
- Club: SchwimmClub Uster Wallisellen, Trojan Swim Club
- College team: University of California, Berkeley
- Coach: Gerard Moerland, Dave Salo
Medal record
European Championships (SC)
Silver medal – second place	2008 Rijeka	200 m freestyle

Dominik Meichtry (born 18 November 1984) is a Swiss competitive swimmer specializing in the middle distance freestyle events. He currently holds six Swiss national records (long course and short course).

Meichtry has won 31 individual Swiss national medals, 25 gold, 6 silver. He has been competing on the international stage since the 2002 European Championships in Berlin. He was voted as Switzerland's top 10 male Athletes in 2008 and won athlete of the year in his canton of St. Gallen.

== College ==
Meichtry committed to the University of California, Berkeley in the spring of 2004 and started school in January 2005. He was a multiple All-American for the California Golden Bears swimming and diving team, and placed 2nd at the 2007 National Collegiate Athletic Association (NCAAs) competition. He was voted team captain of the CAL men's swim team his junior and senior year guiding the bears to a 4th-place finish at the 2008 NCAAs. Meichtry graduated in spring 2009 with a degree in psychology and sociology.

Meichtry trained at The Race Club, a summer swimming camp founded by Olympic Swimmers Gary Hall, Jr. and his father, Gary Hall, Sr. The Race Club, originally known as "The World Team", was designed to serve as a training group for elite swimmers across the world in preparation for the 2000 Sydney Olympic Games. To be able to train with the Race Club, one must either have been ranked in the top 20 in the world the past 3 calendar years or top 3 in their nation in the past year. The Race Club included such well known swimmers as Roland Mark Schoeman, Mark Foster, Ryk Neethling, and Therese Alshammar.

== 2008 ==
Meichtry broke out on the international stage at the 2008 Summer Olympics in Beijing, where he swam the 8th fastest time ever recorded in the 200m Freestyle event. In the process, he beat the likes of Michael Phelps—who may not have been swimming his fastest in a quarter finals—to become the first Swiss swimmer to be the top seed going into semi finals. In the 200m Freestyle final he finished sixth in the event (Phelps won the event, finishing more than 2-1/2 seconds ahead of Meichtry). Meichtry also became the first Swiss to break the 49 second barrier when he led off the 4x100 Freestyle relay in 48.96. Later in the competition he lowered his own record to 48.55 in the 100 Freestyle event.

In December 2008 Meichtry won his first international medal at the 2008 European Short Course Swimming Championships in Rijeka, Croatia. He won the silver medal in the 200m Freestyle and missed out on the European crown by 0.02s.

== 2009 – present ==
Meichtry moved his training base to Southern California in fall of 2009 to train with Dave Salo for Trojan Swim Club out of the University of Southern California. Under the guidance of Dave Salo, Meichtry qualified for his 3rd Olympic Games at the 2011 World Aquatics Championships in Shanghai, China. There he placed 7th in the 200m Freestyle in a time of 1:47.02 and swam a new national record in the 100m Butterfly event.

== Personal bests ==
=== Long Course (50m) ===
Personal bests (50m)
50 m freestyle	22.47	6 June 2008	Janet Evans Invitational Los Angeles
100 m freestyle	48.55	5 April 2008	2008 Summer Olympics
200 m freestyle	1:45.80	10 August 2008	2008 Summer Olympics
400 m freestyle	3:49.11	7 April 2011	SwimCup 2011 Netherlands
100 m butterfly	53.54	29 July 2011	2011 World Aquatics Championships, Shanghai, China
(Last update: 17 November 2011)

=== Short Course (25m) ===
Personal bests (25m)
50 m freestyle	22.00	11 December 2008	2008 European Short Course Swimming Championships, Rijeka (CRO)
100 m freestyle	47.68	12 December 2008	2008 European Short Course Swimming Championships, Rijeka (CRO)
200 m freestyle	1:42.83	22 November 2009	2009 FINA Swimming World Cup, Singapore (SIN)
400 m freestyle	3:39.86	14 November 2009	2009 FINA Swimming World Cup, Berlin (GER)
100 m butterfly	53.19	30 January 2011	20th International Meeting Uster, Uster (SUI)
(Last update: 17 November 2011)

== Personal life ==
Meichtry married American Olympic swimmer Jessica Hardy on 5 October 2013.

== See also ==
- The Race Club
