= Květoslav Svoboda =

Czech swimmer

Personal information
- Nationality: Czech Republic
- Born: 25 August 1982 (age 43) Znojmo, Czechoslovakia

Sport
- Sport: Swimming
- Strokes: Freestyle
Medal record
Men's swimming
Representing Czech Republic
Short Course Worlds
Silver medal – second place	2002 Moscow	400m Freestyle
Short Course Europeans
Silver medal – second place	2000 Valencia	200m Freestyle
Silver medal – second place	2001 Antwerp	200m Freestyle
Silver medal – second place	2002 Riesa	200m Freestyle
Silver medal – second place	2003 Dublin	200m Freestyle
Bronze medal – third place	2000 Valencia	400m Freestyle
Bronze medal – third place	2003 Dublin	400m Freestyle

Květoslav Svoboda (Czech pronunciation: [ˈkvjɛtoslaf ˈsvoboda]) (born 25 August 1982 in Znojmo) is an Olympic freestyle swimmer from the Czech Republic. He swam for the Czech Republic at the 2000, 2004 and 2008 Olympics.

At the 2002 FINA Short Course World Championships he won the silver medal in the 400m Freestyle behind Australia's Grant Hackett.
