= Romāns Miloslavskis =

Latvian politician and swimmer (born 1983)

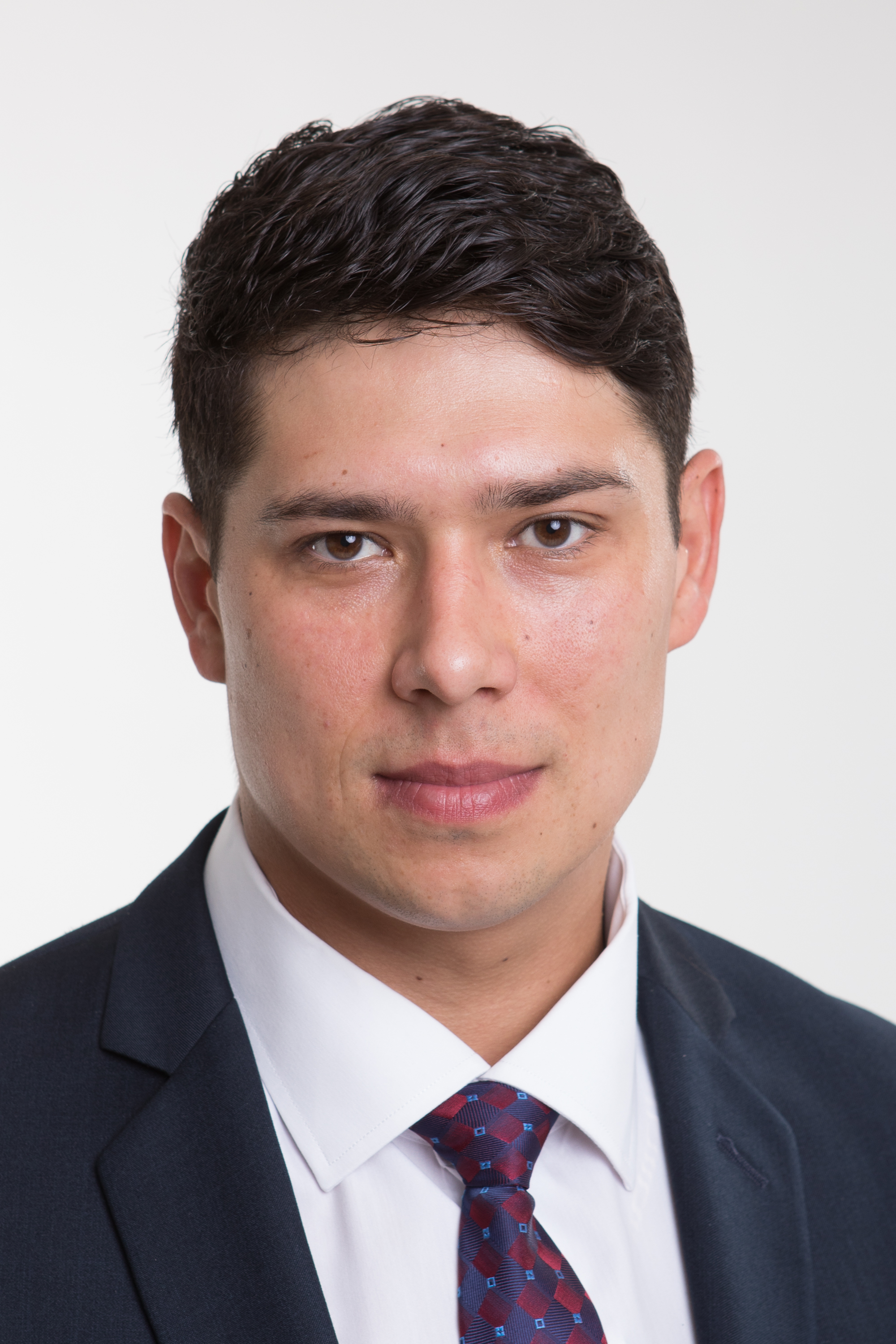

Personal information
- Full name: Romāns Miloslavskis
- National team: Latvia
- Born: 17 October 1983 (age 42) Liepāja, Latvia
- Height: 1.91 m (6 ft 3 in)
- Weight: 87 kg (192 lb)

Sport
- Sport: Swimming
- Strokes: Freestyle
- Club: Liepaja KSS-Ezerkrasts
- Coach: Irina Grodzicka

Romāns Miloslavskis (born 17 October 1983 in Liepāja, Latvia) is a swimmer and politician from Latvia. He has participated in 2004 Summer Olympics and 2008 Summer Olympics. Miloslavskis was 35th in 100 m freestyle at Athens Olympics and achieved 25th place in 200 m freestyle at Beijing Olympics. He holds several Latvian records in swimming. He is a member of the Liepāja City Council for the Harmony Party.
