= Swimming at the 2003 World Aquatics Championships – Men's 50 metre freestyle =

Men's 50m Freestyle at the 2003 FINA World Aquatics Championships
- Venue: Palau Sant Jordi
- Dates: 25 July (prelims, semifinals); 26 July 2003 (final)
- Competitors: 172 from 121 nations
- Winning time: 21.92 seconds

Medalists
gold medal	Alexander Popov	Russia
silver medal	Mark Foster	Great Britain
bronze medal	Pieter v.d. Hoogenband	Netherlands

The Men's 50m Freestyle event at the 10th FINA World Aquatics Championships swam on 25–26 July 2003 in Barcelona, Spain. Preliminary and Semifinal heats swam on July 25, while the Final swam July 26.

Prior to the championships, the following World (WR) and Championship (CR) records were:

- WR: 21.64 swum by Alexander Popov (Russia) on 16 June 2000 in Moscow, Russia
- CR: 22.05 swum by Anthony Ervin (USA) on 22 July 2001 in Fukuoka, Japan

== Results ==
=== Final ===
Place	Lane	Swimmer	Nation	Time	Notes
1	4	Alexander Popov	Russia	21.92	CR
2	1	Mark Foster	Great Britain	22.20	
3	7	Pieter van den Hoogenband	Netherlands	22.29	
4	3	Johan Kenkhuis	Netherlands	22.30	
5	6	Julien Sicot	France	22.38	
6	2	Oleksandr Volynets	Ukraine	22.40	
7	8	Brett Hawke	Australia	22.41	
8	5	Jason Lezak	USA	22.44	

=== Semifinals ===
Rank	Heat + Lane	Swimmer	Nation	Time	Notes
1	S2 L4	Alexander Popov	Russia	21.99	
2	S1 L4	Jason Lezak	USA	22.14	
3	S2 L5	Johan Kenkhuis	Netherlands	22.31	
4	S1 L5	Julien Sicot	France	22.32	
5	S2 L2	Oleksandr Volynets	Ukraine	22.34	
6	S2 L3	Pieter van den Hoogenband	Netherlands	22.36	
7	S1 L2	Mark Foster	Great Britain	22.43	
8	S2 L6	Brett Hawke	Australia	22.45	
9	S1 L6	Ryk Neethling	South Africa	22.46	
10	S2 L8	Frédérick Bousquet	France	22.47	
11	S1 L1	Vyacheslav Shyrshov	Ukraine	22.57	
12	S2 L7	Eduard Lorente	Spain	22.60	
13	S1 L3	Peter Mankoč	Slovenia	22.61	
14	S2 L1	Michele Scarica	Italy	22.64	
14	S1 L8	Denis Pimankov	Russia	22.64	
16	S1 L7	Karel Novy	Switzerland	22.66	

=== Preliminaries ===
Rank	Heat+Lane	Swimmer	Nation	Time	Notes
1	H22 L4	Alexander Popov	Russia	21.98	q, CR
2	H22 L5	Jason Lezak	United States	22.29	q
3	H21 L4	Johan Kenkhuis	Netherlands	22.32	q
4	H20 L1	Julien Sicot	France	22.36	q
5	H22 L2	Pieter van den Hoogenband	Netherlands	22.51	q
6	H18 L5	Peter Mankoč	Slovenia	22.54	q
6	H21 L3	Brett Hawke	Australia	22.54	q
8	H20 L2	Ryk Neethling	South Africa	22.56	q
9	H20 L3	Oleksandr Volynets	Ukraine	22.57	q
10	H21 L2	Mark Foster	Great Britain	22.59	q
11	H20 L7	Eduard Lorente	Spain	22.60	q
12	H18 L4	Karel Novy	Switzerland	22.63	q
12	H20 L8	Michele Scarica	Italy	22.63	q
12	H22 L6	Vyacheslav Shyrshov	Ukraine	22.63	q
15	H22 L8	Frédérick Bousquet	France	22.64	q
16	H17 L5	Denis Pimankov	Russia	22.69	q
17	H20 L6	Roland Schoeman	South Africa	22.74	
17	H21 L6	Salim Iles	Algeria	22.74	
17	H22 L3	Anthony Ervin	United States	22.74	
20	H20 L4	Bartosz Kizierowski	Poland	22.75	
20	H20 L5	Lorenzo Vismara	Italy	22.75	
20	H22 L7	Stefan Nystrand	Sweden	22.75	
23	H21 L7	Fernando Scherer	Brazil	22.80	
24	H21 L1	Ricardo Bousquet	Puerto Rico	22.83	
25	H19 L8	Pedro Silva	Portugal	22.86	
26	H19 L7	Torsten Spanneberg	Germany	22.93	
26	H21 L5	Ashley Callus	Australia	22.93	
28	H19 L3	Milorad Čavić	FR Yugoslavia	22.95	
29	H16 L8	Matti Rajakylä	Finland	23.02	
29	H18 L6	Rolandas Gimbutis	Lithuania	23.02	
31	H19 L5	Jader Souza	Brazil	23.04	
32	H21 L8	Julio Santos	Ecuador	23.10	
33	H19 L6	Jere Hård	Finland	23.11	
34	H22 L1	Kim Min-Suk	South Korea	23.13	
35	H17 L7	Brent Hayden	Canada	23.14	
35	H19 L4	Renaat Dreesen	Belgium	23.14	
37	H18 L8	Camilo Becerra	Colombia	23.17	
38	H17 L4	Danil Haustov	Estonia	23.19	
39	H18 L3	Attila Zubor	Hungary	23.20	
40	H17 L6	Eric La Fleur	Sweden	23.23	
41	H18 L2	Ales Volcansek	Croatia	23.25	
42	H16 L1	Paulius Viktoravicius	Lithuania	23.34	
42	H18 L1	Chen Zuo	China	23.34	
44	H16 L4	Christoph Bühler	Switzerland	23.36	
45	H19 L2	Yannick Lupien	Canada	23.37	
46	H19 L1	Apostolos Tsagkarakis	Greece	23.42	
47	H15 L3	Lee Chung-Hee	South Korea	23.49	
48	H17 L3	Rastislav Kanuk	Slovakia	23.56	
49	H14 L7	Octavio Alesi	Venezuela	23.64	
50	H17 L1	Duje Draganja	Croatia	23.65	
51	H14 L2	Romāns Miloslavskis	Latvia	23.67	
51	H15 L2	Mihály Flaskay	Hungary	23.67	
53	H16 L6	Raymond Rosal	Venezuela	23.68	
54	H15 L4	Carl Probert	Fiji	23.70	
55	H13 L4	Ryan Pini	Papua New Guinea	23.74	
56	H10 L3	Matjaž Markič	Slovenia	23.83	
57	H16 L7	Francisco Picasso	Uruguay	23.85	
57	H18 L7	Arwut Chinnapasaen	Thailand	23.85	
59	H16 L3	Stavros Michaelides	Cyprus	23.89	
60	H14 L3	Liu Yu	China	23.92	
61	H16 L2	Allen Ong	Malaysia	23.96	
62	H12 L2	Heidar Ingi Marinosson	Iceland	24.02	
63	H17 L2	Octavian Guţu	Moldova	24.04	
64	H12 L1	Zeljko Panic	Bosnia and Herzegovina	24.05	
65	H13 L3	Paul Kutscher	Uruguay	24.08	
66	H15 L8	Harbeth Fu Wing	Hong Kong	24.10	
67	H12 L6	Terrence Haynes	Barbados	24.15	
67	H17 L8	Chrysanthos Papachrysanthou	Cyprus	24.15	
69	H11 L5	Wickus Nienaber	Swaziland	24.18	
69	H13 L7	Martyn Forde	Barbados	24.18	
71	H15 L1	Howard Hinds	Netherlands Antilles	24.33	
72	H13 L5	Ismael Ortiz	Panama	24.34	
73	H13 L8	Nicholas Bovell	Trinidad and Tobago	24.40	
73	H14 L4	Roberto Sanso	Costa Rica	24.40	
75	H15 L6	Aleksandr Agafonov	Uzbekistan	24.41	
76	H12 L3	Gregory Arkhurst	Ivory Coast	24.46	
77	H12 L8	Afolabi Adeleke-Adedoyin	Nigeria	24.47	
78	H13 L6	Vyacheslav Titarenko	Kazakhstan	24.51	
79	H15 L5	Ashby Brendan	Zimbabwe	24.54	
80	H11 L4	Carles Ridaura	Andorra	24.60	
81	H15 L7	Sven Schneider	Estonia	24.61	
82	H11 L8	Adil Bellaz	Morocco	24.67	
83	H05 L6	Mauricio Prudencio	Bolivia	24.70	
84	H11 L1	Gentle Offoin	Nigeria	24.74	
85	H12 L5	Maximiliano Schnettler	Chile	24.76	
86	H14 L6	Aloïs Dansou	Benin	24.81	
87	H13 L1	Lim Yu Lung Lubrey	Malaysia	24.83	
88	H08 L6	Onan Orlando Thom	Guyana	24.84	
88	H10 L8	Kenny Roberts	Seychelles	24.84	
90	H08 L4	Lao Kuan Fong	Macau	24.86	
91	H11 L2	Kin Lun Doo	Hong Kong	24.90	
92	H11 L6	Zaid Almarafi	Jordan	24.92	
93	H12 L7	Fadi Jalabi	Syria	24.93	
94	H11 L7	Gustavo Adolfo Martinez	Honduras	24.96	
95	H11 L3	Levan Berdize	Georgia	24.98	
96	H13 L2	Cem Pasaoglu	Turkey	24.99	
97	H10 L2	V. Arun Vellore	India	25.00	
98	H14 L1	Ayoub Al-Mas	United Arab Emirates	25.05	
99	H14 L5	Maran Cruz	Puerto Rico	25.07	
100	H09 L3	Davy Bisslik	Aruba	25.10	
100	H10 L6	Joao Aguiar	Angola	25.10	
102	H08 L7	Carlos Castro	Chile	25.11	
103	H10 L4	Le Ba Lam	Vietnam	25.14	
104	H09 L2	Rama Vyombo	Kenya	25.25	
105	H09 L8	Wong Wing Cheung Victor	Macau	25.28	
106	H09 L4	Abed Rahman Kaaki	Lebanon	25.31	
106	H10 L5	Jamie Peterkin	Saint Lucia	25.31	
108	H07 L5	Hesham Shehab	Bahrain	25.35	
109	H08 L1	Ranui Teriipaia	Tahiti	25.53	
109	H09 L1	Babak Farhoudi	Iran	25.53	
111	H09 L5	Timur Irgashev	Uzbekistan	25.55	
112	H06 L5	Miguel Angel Navarro	Bolivia	25.60	
113	H06 L1	Othmane Elghnimi	Morocco	25.78	
114	H06 L2	Aung Yan Lin	Myanmar	25.82	
114	H06 L8	Bradford Worrell	Saint Lucia	25.82	
116	H07 L3	Yann Lausan	Tahiti	25.83	
117	H07 L4	Ahmed Mohamed Jewel	Bangladesh	25.85	
118	H06 L4	Loren Lindborg	Marshall Islands	25.87	
119	H05 L7	Cole Shade Sule	Cameroon	25.96	
120	H08 L5	Abdoulaye Mbow	Senegal	25.98	
120	H08 L3	Gordon Touw Ngie Tjouw	Suriname	25.98	
122	H09 L6	Jean Luc Razakarivony	Madagascar	26.11	
123	H09 L7	Tamir Andryei	Mongolia	26.19	
123	H10 L7	Urnultsaikhan Ganbold	Mongolia	26.19	
125	H07 L2	Connor H Keith	Guam	26.21	
126	H07 L6	Moe Aung Kyaw	Myanmar	26.24	
126	H08 L8	Benjamin Wells	Papua New Guinea	26.24	
128	H07 L1	Ronald Ying	Guyana	26.35	
129	H05 L2	Jean Laurent Ravera	Monaco	26.37	
130	H04 L1	Peter James Linch	Zambia	26.44	
131	H07 L8	Amar Shah	Kenya	26.46	
132	H04 L3	Rony Bakale	Republic of the Congo	26.47	
133	H05 L5	Patrick Boustant	Lebanon	26.51	
134	H05 L1	Anderson Bonabart	Federated States of Micronesia	26.55	
135	H07 L7	Ibrahim Maliki	Niger	26.58	
136	H05 L3	Kin−Vincent Duenas	Guam	26.61	
137	H05 L4	Kreshnik Gjata	Albania	26.64	
138	H06 L3	Mohammed Abbas	Iraq	26.75	
139	H10 L1	Nuno Rola	Angola	26.83	
140	H06 L6	Orkhan Samadov	Azerbaijan	26.84	
141	H04 L4	Fernando Medrano	Nicaragua	26.87	
142	H05 L8	Clark Randrianandraina	Madagascar	26.89	
143	H04 L7	Welbert Samuel	Federated States of Micronesia	26.93	
144	H04 L6	Stephenson Wallace	Saint Vincent and the Grenadines	27.01	
145	H04 L8	Issam Halawani	Palestine	27.14	
146	H03 L4	Chisela Kanchela	Zambia	27.33	
147	H04 L5	Fidel Davis	Saint Vincent and the Grenadines	27.40	
148	H01 L3	Hassan Mubah	Maldives	27.51	
149	H06 L7	Aldi Gugushka	Albania	27.52	
150	H01 L5	Hem Kiri	Cambodia	27.56	
151	H02 L8	Joshua Marfleet	Samoa	27.68	
152	H03 L6	Sikhounxay Ounkhamphanyavong	Laos	27.71	
153	H03 L5	Edgar Luberenga	Uganda	27.81	
154	H02 L4	Carlos Notarianni	Marshall Islands	28.48	
155	H03 L7	Bounthanom Vongphachanh	Laos	28.68	
156	H03 L2	Hojamamed Hojamamedov	Turkmenistan	29.07	
157	H03 L3	Gilbert Kaburu	Uganda	29.09	
158	H01 L7	Mamadou Ouedraogo	Burkina Faso	29.19	
159	H03 L1	Mohammed Sultan Judat	Yemen	29.82	
160	H02 L6	Leonce Sekama	Rwanda	30.57	
161	H02 L7	Blaise Pascal Gasabira	Rwanda	31.22	
162	H02 L2	Malique Williams	Antigua and Barbuda	34.04	
163	H02 L1	Glyn Tonge	Antigua and Barbuda	35.15	
-	H01 L4	A.A. Romain Belemtougri	Burkina Faso	DQ	
-	H02 L3	Ali Maiga Akibou	Niger	DQ	
-	H16 L5	Nuno Laurentino	Portugal	DNS	
-	H14 L8	Ayoub Salem Mallalah	United Arab Emirates	DNS	
-	H08 L2	Ahmed Ouattata Zie	Ivory Coast	DNS	
-	H04 L2	Alain Ives Mewoutou	Cameroon	DNS	
-	H03 L8	Aiah Emerson Mansa Musai	Sierra Leone	DNS	
-	H02 L5	Abubakarr Ialloh	Sierra Leone	DNS	
-	H01 L6	Herve Nkurunziza	Burundi	DNS	
