= Swimming at the 2003 World Aquatics Championships – Men's 100 metre freestyle =

Men's 100m Freestyle at the 2003 FINA World Aquatics Championships
- Venue: Palau Sant Jordi
- Dates: 23 July (prelims, semifinals); 24 July (final)
- Competitors: 167
- Winning time: 48.42 seconds

Medalists
| gold medal | Alexander Popov | Russia |
| silver medal | Pieter v.d. Hoogenband | Netherlands |
| bronze medal | Ian Thorpe | Australia |

The Men's 100 Freestyle event at the 10th FINA World Aquatics Championships swam on 23–24 July 2003 in Barcelona, Spain. Preliminary and Semifinal heats swam on July 23; while the Final swam on July 24.

Prior to the start of the event, the existing World (WR) and Championship (CR) records were:

- WR: 47.84 by Pieter van den Hoogenband (Netherlands) swum on 19 September 2000 in Sydney, Australia
- CR: 48.33 by Anthony Ervin (USA) swum on 27 July 2001 in Fukuoka, Japan

== Results ==
=== Final ===
| Place | Swimmer | Nation | Time | Notes |
|---|---|---|---|---|
| 1 | Alexander Popov | Russia | 48.42 | |
| 2 | Pieter van den Hoogenband | Netherlands | 48.68 | |
| 3 | Ian Thorpe | Australia | 48.77 | |
| 4 | Jason Lezak | USA | 48.94 | |
| 5 | Andrei Kapralov | Russia | 48.95 | |
| 6 | Frédérick Bousquet | France | 49.30 | |
| 7 | Ryk Neethling | South Africa | 49.51 | |
| 8 | Milorad Čavić | Yugoslavia | 49.65 | |

=== Semifinals ===
| Rank | Heat + Lane | Swimmer | Nation | Time | Notes |
|---|---|---|---|---|---|
| 1 | S2 L4 | Pieter van den Hoogenband | Netherlands | 48.39 | q |
| 2 | S2 L5 | Alexander Popov | Russia | 48.51 | q |
| 3 | S1 L5 | Ian Thorpe | Australia | 48.71 | q |
| 4 | S1 L4 | Jason Lezak | USA | 48.78 | q |
| 5 | S2 L3 | Andrei Kapralov | Russia | 48.98 | q |
| 6 | S1 L2 | Ryk Neethling | South Africa | 49.29 | q |
| 7 | S2 L7 | Frédérick Bousquet | France | 49.44 | q |
| 8 | S1 L7 | Milorad Čavić | Yugoslavia | 49.54 | q |
| 9 | S2 L6 | Torsten Spanneberg | Germany | 49.55 | |
| 10 | S1 L1 | Ashley Callus | Australia | 49.56 | |
| 11 | S1 L3 | Brent Hayden | Canada | 49.60 | |
| 12 | S1 L6 | Scott Tucker | USA | 49.70 | |
| 13 | S2 L8 | Lorenzo Vismara | Italy | 49.72 | |
| 14 | S2 L1 | Karel Novy | Switzerland | 49.77 | |
| 15 | S2 L2 | Peter Mankoč | Slovenia | 49.88 | |
| 16 | S1 L8 | Stefan Herbst | Germany | 50.12 | |

=== Preliminaries ===
| Rank | Heat+Lane | Swimmer | Nation | Time | Notes |
|---|---|---|---|---|---|
| 1 | H21 L4 | Pieter van den Hoogenband | Netherlands | 48.86 | q |
| 2 | H19 L3 | Jason Lezak | United States | 48.93 | q |
| 3 | H20 L4 | Alexander Popov | Russia | 48.94 | q |
| 4 | H19 L4 | Ian Thorpe | Australia | 49.17 | q |
| 5 | H20 L3 | Andrei Kapralov | Russia | 49.21 | q |
| 6 | H19 L2 | Brent Hayden | Canada | 49.54 | q |
| 7 | H19 L1 | Torsten Spanneberg | Germany | 49.58 | q |
| 8 | H20 L5 | Scott Tucker | United States | 49.59 | q |
| 9 | H18 L6 | Peter Mankoč | Slovenia | 49.63 | q |
| 9 | H19 L5 | Ryk Neethling | South Africa | 49.63 | q |
| 11 | H21 L6 | Frédérick Bousquet | France | 49.67 | q |
| 12 | H17 L3 | Milorad Čavić | FR Yugoslavia | 49.68 | q |
| 13 | H20 L8 | Karel Novy | Switzerland | 49.73 | q |
| 14 | H21 L5 | Ashley Callus | Australia | 49.74 | q |
| 15 | H20 L2 | Lorenzo Vismara | Italy | 49.78 | q |
| 16 | H20 L7 | Stefan Herbst | Germany | 49.87 | q |
| 17 | H21 L1 | Christian Galenda | Italy | 49.90 | |
| 18 | H20 L1 | Johan Kenkhuis | Netherlands | 50.07 | |
| 19 | H18 L5 | Rolandas Gimbutis | Lithuania | 50.12 | |
| 20 | H21 L2 | Lars Frölander | Sweden | 50.14 | |
| 21 | H19 L6 | Romain Barnier | France | 50.16 | |
| 22 | H21 L3 | Salim Iles | Algeria | 50.20 | |
| 23 | H17 L4 | Zuo Chen | China | 50.23 | |
| 24 | H18 L8 | Vyacheslav Shyrshov | Ukraine | 50.24 | |
| 25 | H21 L7 | Attila Zubor | Hungary | 50.28 | |
| 26 | H18 L4 | Eduard Lorente | Spain | 50.33 | |
| 27 | H16 L3 | Danil Haustov | Estonia | 50.42 | |
| 28 | H19 L7 | Roland Schoeman | South Africa | 50.43 | |
| 29 | H18 L2 | Renaat Dreesen | Belgium | 50.52 | |
| 30 | H18 L3 | Jader Souza | Brazil | 50.57 | |
| 31 | H21 L8 | Yannick Lupien | Canada | 50.58 | |
| 32 | H15 L2 | Örn Arnarson | Iceland | 50.59 | |
| 33 | H18 L1 | Ricardo Bousquet | Puerto Rico | 50.73 | |
| 34 | H20 L6 | Duje Draganja | Croatia | 50.76 | |
| 35 | H11 L8 | Andrii Serdinov | Ukraine | 50.77 | |
| 36 | H16 L7 | Matti Rajakylä | Finland | 50.83 | |
| 37 | H17 L1 | Daisuke Hosokawa | Japan | 50.86 | |
| 38 | H17 L8 | Rodrigo Castro | Brazil | 50.89 | |
| 39 | H18 L7 | Stefan Nystrand | Sweden | 50.91 | |
| 40 | H17 L2 | Pavel Lagoun | Belarus | 50.99 | |
| 41 | H19 L8 | Jere Hård | Finland | 51.01 | |
| 42 | H16 L4 | Paulius Viktoravičius | Lithuania | 51.08 | |
| 43 | H16 L6 | Igor Čerenšek | Croatia | 51.20 | |
| 44 | H16 L5 | Bartosz Kizierowski | Poland | 51.21 | |
| 45 | H16 L2 | Ravil Nachaev | Uzbekistan | 51.23 | |
| 46 | H15 L1 | Romāns Miloslavskis | Latvia | 51.37 | |
| 47 | H16 L8 | Raymond Rosal | Venezuela | 51.57 | |
| 48 | H13 L4 | Camilo Becerra | Colombia | 51.68 | |
| 49 | H14 L7 | Apostolos Tsagkarakis | Greece | 51.73 | |
| 50 | H17 L5 | Nuno Laurentino | Portugal | 51.83 | |
| 51 | H14 L1 | Paul Kutscher | Uruguay | 51.88 | |
| 52 | H14 L5 | Octavian Guţu | Moldova | 52.06 | |
| 52 | H14 L6 | Shai Livnat | Israel | 52.06 | |
| 54 | H14 L8 | Carl Probert | Fiji | 52.10 | |
| 54 | H15 L5 | Cameron Gibson | New Zealand | 52.10 | |
| 56 | H15 L6 | Ryan Pini | Papua New Guinea | 52.12 | |
| 57 | H15 L8 | Alexandros Aresti | Cyprus | 52.17 | |
| 58 | H14 L2 | Željko Panić | Bosnia and Herzegovina | 52.18 | |
| 59 | H17 L6 | Min Suk Kim | South Korea | 52.25 | |
| 60 | H12 L4 | Ismael Ortiz | Panama | 52.45 | |
| 61 | H15 L4 | Yun Ho Koh | South Korea | 52.46 | |
| 62 | H15 L3 | Francisco Picasso | Uruguay | 52.55 | |
| 63 | H14 L4 | Alexander Agafonov | Uzbekistan | 52.59 | |
| 64 | H12 L7 | Ken Tomson | Estonia | 52.60 | |
| 64 | H14 L3 | Albert Subirats | Venezuela | 52.60 | |
| 66 | H15 L7 | Allen Ong | Malaysia | 52.66 | |
| 67 | H13 L3 | Vyacheslav Titarenko | Kazakhstan | 52.83 | |
| 68 | H12 L2 | Adil Bellaz | Morocco | 52.84 | |
| 69 | H13 L2 | Ronald Cowen | Bermuda | 52.99 | |
| 70 | H13 L1 | Maximiliano Schnettler | Chile | 53.07 | |
| 71 | H12 L3 | Alexandr Ivlev | Moldova | 53.11 | |
| 72 | H16 L1 | Aytekin Mindan | Turkey | 53.13 | |
| 73 | H11 L6 | Heidar Ingi Marinosson | Iceland | 53.15 | |
| 74 | H12 L5 | Howard Hinds | Netherlands Antilles | 53.19 | |
| 75 | H11 L5 | Kin Lun Doo | Hong Kong | 53.25 | |
| 76 | H11 L2 | Nicholas Bovell | Trinidad and Tobago | 53.29 | |
| 77 | H07 L1 | Kenny Roberts | Seychelles | 53.33 | |
| 78 | H11 L7 | Carlos Castro | Chile | 53.35 | |
| 79 | H10 L3 | Tuck Kar Wong | Malaysia | 53.51 | |
| 80 | H13 L7 | Roberto Sanso | Costa Rica | 53.52 | |
| 81 | H12 L6 | Ashby Brendan | Zimbabwe | 53.55 | |
| 82 | H10 L2 | Sean Dehere | Barbados | 53.62 | |
| 83 | H06 L7 | Gentle Offoin | Nigeria | 53.70 | |
| 84 | H08 L4 | Babak Farhoudi | Iran | 83.76 | |
| 85 | H12 L8 | Diego Mularoni | San Marino | 53.88 | |
| 86 | H11 L4 | Wing Fu | Hong Kong | 53.90 | |
| 87 | H10 L4 | Gregory Arkhurst | Ivory Coast | 54.01 | |
| 88 | H10 L5 | Martyn Forde | Barbados | 54.07 | |
| 89 | H13 L8 | Anovar Bennaceur | Tunisia | 54.25 | |
| 90 | H12 L1 | Cem Pasaoglu | Turkey | 54.32 | |
| 91 | H09 L6 | Carles Ridaura | Andorra | 54.34 | |
| 92 | H09 L4 | Gustavo Adolfo Martinez | Honduras | 54.49 | |
| 93 | H10 L7 | Zurab Khomasuridze | Georgia | 54.52 | |
| 94 | H09 L5 | Wing Cheung Victor Wong | Macau | 54.58 | |
| 95 | H09 L8 | Obied Ahmed Al Jassimi | United Arab Emirates | 54.67 | |
| 96 | H06 L6 | Yann Lausan | Tahiti | 54.88 | |
| 96 | H13 L6 | Maran Cruz | Puerto Rico | 54.88 | |
| 98 | H10 L6 | Alois Dansou | Benin | 54.89 | |
| 99 | H08 L6 | Kunakorn Yimsomruay | Thailand | 54.90 | |
| 100 | H17 L7 | Shaohua Huang | China | 54.98 | |
| 101 | H09 L1 | Levan Berdize | Georgia | 55.07 | |
| 102 | H09 L7 | Ayoub Salem Almas | United Arab Emirates | 55.16 | |
| 103 | H08 L7 | Khaly Ciss | Senegal | 55.17 | |
| 104 | H10 L8 | Afolabi Adeleke-Adedoyin | Nigeria | 55.23 | |
| 105 | H11 L1 | Mikayel Koloyan | Armenia | 55.34 | |
| 106 | H07 L8 | Abed Rahman Kaaki | Lebanon | 55.41 | |
| 107 | H06 L4 | Onan Thom | Guyana | 55.44 | |
| 107 | H08 L5 | Jamie Peterkin | Saint Lucia | 55.44 | |
| 109 | H08 L3 | Joao Aguiar | Angola | 55.48 | |
| 110 | H08 L2 | Davy Bisslik | Aruba | 55.52 | |
| 111 | H07 L4 | Miguel Navarro | Bolivia | 55.61 | |
| 112 | H10 L1 | Mauricio Prudencio | Bolivia | 55.70 | |
| 113 | H07 L7 | Kuan Fong Lao | Macau | 55.86 | |
| 114 | H08 L8 | Zaid Almarafi | Jordan | 56.05 | |
| 115 | H04 L5 | Rony Bakale | Republic of the Congo | 56.15 | |
| 115 | H05 L3 | Lam Le Ba | Vietnam | 56.15 | |
| 117 | H06 L8 | Ranui Teriipaia | Tahiti | 56.18 | |
| 118 | H08 L1 | Fadi Jalabi | Syria | 56.20 | |
| 119 | H09 L3 | Othmane Elghnimi | Morocco | 56.25 | |
| 120 | H06 L5 | Bradford Worrell | Saint Lucia | 56.27 | |
| 121 | H09 L2 | Omar Abu Faris | Jordan | 56.36 | |
| 122 | H06 L2 | Gordon Touw Ngie Tjouw | Suriname | 56.49 | |
| 122 | H07 L5 | Benjamin Wells | Papua New Guinea | 56.49 | |
| 124 | H06 L3 | Rama Vyombo | Kenya | 56.65 | |
| 125 | H07 L3 | Abdoulaye Mbow | Senegal | 56.75 | |
| 126 | H04 L4 | Dean Palacios | Northern Mariana Islands | 57.07 | |
| 127 | H05 L4 | Patrick Boustany | Lebanon | 57.15 | |
| 128 | H04 L3 | Seung Gin Lee | Northern Mariana Islands | 57.20 | |
| 129 | H06 L1 | Omar Núñez | Nicaragua | 57.27 | |
| 130 | H05 L1 | Loren Lindborg | Marshall Islands | 57.30 | |
| 131 | H02 L2 | Hesham Al Shehabi | Bahrain | 57.44 | |
| 132 | H05 L2 | Jean Laurent Ravera | Monaco | 57.49 | |
| 133 | H04 L1 | Tamir Andrei | Mongolia | 57.66 | |
| 133 | H05 L7 | Connor Keith | Guam | 57.66 | |
| 135 | H07 L6 | Sergey Dyachkov | Azerbaijan | 57.73 | |
| 136 | H01 L5 | Yan Lin Aung | Myanmar | 57.79 | |
| 137 | H05 L8 | Asela Pradeep Perera | Sri Lanka | 57.93 | |
| 138 | H05 L6 | Ahmed Ouattara Zie | Ivory Coast | 58.04 | |
| 139 | H03 L3 | Kabir Walia | Kenya | 58.21 | |
| 140 | H03 L5 | Kin-Vincent Duenas | Guam | 58.35 | |
| 141 | H04 L2 | Orkhan Samadov | Azerbaijan | 58.42 | |
| 142 | H07 L2 | Nuno Rola | Angola | 58.48 | |
| 143 | H03 L8 | Peter James Linch | Zambia | 58.60 | |
| 144 | H04 L6 | Urnultsaikhan Ganbold | Mongolia | 58.62 | |
| 145 | H04 L8 | Clark Randrianandraina | Madagascar | 58.80 | |
| 146 | H03 L4 | Ronald Ying | Guyana | 59.44 | |
| 147 | H03 L2 | Neil Agius | Malta | 59.81 | |
| 148 | H03 L7 | Leonel Matonse | Mozambique | 59.87 | |
| 149 | H03 L1 | Mohammed S. Abbas | Iraq | 59.96 | |
| 150 | H04 L7 | Kreshnik Gjata | Albania | 1:00.13 | |
| 151 | H02 L6 | Chisela Kanchela | Zambia | 1:01.51 | |
| 152 | H02 L4 | Edgar Luberenga | Uganda | 1:01.61 | |
| 153 | H03 L6 | Aldi Gugushka | Albania | 1:01.78 | |
| 154 | H02 L8 | Joshua Marfleet | Samoa | 1:02.97 | |
| 155 | H02 L1 | Carlos Notarianni | Marshall Islands | 1:03.88 | |
| 156 | H01 L2 | Hassan Mubah | Maldives | 1:04.28 | |
| 157 | H01 L1 | Momadon Ouedrago | Burkina Faso | 1:07.09 | |
| 158 | H01 L3 | A.A. Romain Belemtougri | Burkina Faso | 1:19.42 | |
| - | H01 L4 | Mohammed Sultan Judat | Yemen | DQ | |
| - | H01 L6 | Ahmed Fargani | Libya | DQ | |
| - | H05 L5 | Aung Kyaw Moe | Myanmar | DQ | |
| - | - | Christoph Bühler | Switzerland | DNS | |
| - | - | Ayoub Salem Mallalah | United Arab Emirates | DNS | |
| - | - | Shade Sule Cole | Cameroon | DNS | |
| - | - | Fils Theodore Tchena | Cameroon | DNS | |
| - | - | Gibrilla Kanu | Sierra Leone | DNS | |
| - | - | Emery Nziyumvira | Burundi | DNS | |
| - | - | Fidel Davis | Saint Vincent and the Grenadines | DNS | |
