= Swimming at the 2005 World Aquatics Championships – Men's 50 metre freestyle =

Men's 50 metre freestyle at the 2005 FINA World Championships
- Venue: Parc Jean-Drapeau
- Dates: 29 July 2005 (heats, semifinals); 30 July 2005 (final)
- Competitors: 133 from 92 nations
- Winning time: 21.69 seconds

Medalists
gold medal	Roland Schoeman	South Africa
silver medal	Duje Draganja	Croatia
bronze medal	Bartosz Kizierowski	Poland

The men's 50 metre freestyle event at the 2005 World Aquatics Championships was held on 29 (heats and semifinals) and 30 July 2005 at the Parc Jean-Drapeau in Montreal, Canada.

== Records ==
Prior to this competition, the existing world and competition records were as follows:

World record	Alexander Popov (RUS)	21.64	Moscow, Russia	16 June 2000
Championship record	Alexander Popov (RUS)	21.92	Barcelona, Spain	26 July 2003

The following records were established during the competition:

Date	Round	Name	Nationality	Time	Record
31 July	Final	Roland Schoeman	South Africa	21.69	CR

== Results ==
=== Heats ===
Rank	Heat	Lane	Name	Nationality	Time	Notes
1	16	2	Bartosz Kizierowski	Poland	22.08	
2	16	3	Frédérick Bousquet	France	22.21	
3	15	2	Salim Iles	Algeria	22.24	
4	16	6	Julien Sicot	France	22.31	
5	17	3	Oleksandr Volynets	Ukraine	22.38	
6	17	4	Duje Draganja	Croatia	22.41	
7	16	4	Roland Schoeman	South Africa	22.42	
8	17	6	Javier Noriega	Spain	22.47	
8	17	2	Nick Brunelli	United States	22.47	
10	13	4	Peter Mankoč	Slovenia	22.51	
11	15	5	Lukasz Gasior	Poland	22.53	
12	17	8	Yevgeny Lagunov	Russia	22.56	
13	15	4	Brett Hawke	Australia	22.57	
13	15	7	Eduard Lorente	Spain	22.57	
15	17	5	Stefan Nystrand	Sweden	22.64	
16	14	4	Mark Veens	Netherlands	22.65	
16	15	3	Andrey Kapralov	Russia	22.65	
18	14	6	Ryk Neethling	South Africa	22.68	
18	16	7	Lorenzo Vismara	Italy	22.68	
20	12	6	Matti Rajakylä	Finland	22.71	
21	16	5	Jason Lezak	United States	22.72	
22	15	1	Michele Scarica	Italy	22.74	
23	16	1	Rolandas Gimbutis	Lithuania	22.79	
24	15	6	Fernando Scherer	Brazil	22.81	
25	15	8	Jernej Godec	Slovenia	22.82	
26	14	5	Michael Klim	Australia	22.90	
27	17	1	Ricardo Busquets	Puerto Rico	22.96	
28	13	2	Marcus Piehl	Sweden	22.97	
28	14	2	Yannick Lupien	Canada	22.97	
30	13	5	Stanislav Neviarovski	Belarus	22.99	
31	17	7	Rafed El-Masri	Syria	23.07	
32	14	8	Daisuke Hosokawa	Japan	23.13	
33	14	7	Makoto Ito	Japan	23.24	
34	12	7	Arwut Chinnapasaen	Thailand	23.30	
35	13	3	Chen Zuo	China	23.36	
36	13	6	Ravil Nachaev	Uzbekistan	23.38	
36	13	7	Matias Aguilera	Argentina	23.38	
38	10	5	Paulius Viktoravicius	Lithuania	23.43	
39	12	4	Vitaliy Khan	Kazakhstan	23.44	
40	14	1	Han Tianji	China	23.47	
41	2	8	Cameron Gibson	New Zealand	23.58	
41	11	3	Jose Mafio	Uruguay	23.58	
41	12	5	Jason Dunford	Kenya	23.58	
44	12	8	Jacinto Ayala	Dominican Republic	23.59	
45	13	8	Carl Probert	Fiji	23.60	
46	12	3	Antonio Hernández	Cuba	23.62	
47	11	4	Andrei Radzionov	Belarus	23.66	
48	11	5	Terrence Haynes	Barbados	23.84	
49	11	7	Stavros Michailidis	Cyprus	23.94	
50	2	1	Martyn Forde	Barbados	23.98	
51	10	6	Alexandr Sklyar	Kazakhstan	24.05	
52	12	2	Joshua Laban	United States Virgin Islands	24.08	
53	9	4	Lao Kuan Fong	Macau	24.17	
54	11	2	Leslie Kwok	Singapore	24.19	
55	11	6	Mohamed Madwa	Kuwait	24.22	
56	11	1	Rodrigo Díaz	Guatemala	24.25	
57	7	3	Onan Orlando Thom	Guyana	24.33	
57	9	8	Sim Ki Hyuk	South Korea	24.33	
59	9	5	Andy Wibowo	Indonesia	24.45	
59	9	2	Basil Kaaki	Lebanon	24.45	
61	8	4	Gregory Arkhurst	Ivory Coast	24.49	
62	9	7	David Dunford	Kenya	24.51	
62	10	8	Sergey Tsoy	Uzbekistan	24.51	
64	1	5	Matias Rementeria Perez	Uruguay	24.55	
65	10	7	Teo Ernest Quee Lim	Singapore	24.56	
66	10	1	Ronald Cowen	Bermuda	24.57	
67	10	3	Mohamad Al-Naser	Kuwait	24.64	
68	7	8	Kieran Locke	United States Virgin Islands	24.67	
68	9	3	Brad Hamilton	Jamaica	24.67	
70	8	5	Alessio Domenack	Peru	24.68	
71	11	8	Ryan Pini	Papua New Guinea	24.76	
72	1	3	Graham Smith	Bermuda	24.87	
73	9	6	Youssef Hafdi	Morocco	24.92	
74	10	2	Mikayel Koloyan	Armenia	24.94	
75	8	8	Jose Lobo	Paraguay	24.97	
76	7	6	Aleksandr Moseshvili	Georgia	25.01	
77	6	3	Bradford Worrell	Saint Lucia	25.03	
78	2	2	Aung Yan Lin	Myanmar	25.07	
79	8	6	Connor H Keith	Guam	25.08	
80	7	1	Tunui Cowan	Tahiti	25.14	
81	5	3	Alexander Ray	Namibia	25.17	
82	6	4	Yassir Abdalla	Bolivia	25.22	
82	10	4	Vasilii Danilov	Kyrgyzstan	25.22	
84	9	1	Madicke Mbengue	Senegal	25.23	
85	7	7	Horacio Carcamo	Honduras	25.24	
86	8	2	Joao Matias	Angola	25.30	
87	6	7	Alain Brigion-Tobe	Cameroon	25.36	
88	6	5	Julio Rivera	Honduras	25.51	
88	6	8	Anas Hamadeh	Jordan	25.51	
88	8	1	Soheil Ashtiani	Iran	25.51	
91	8	7	Marcelo Alba	Bolivia	25.56	
92	7	4	Romulo Pereira	Angola	25.57	
93	6	2	Milinda Wickramasinghe	Sri Lanka	25.66	
94	7	2	Pape Madiop Ndong	Senegal	25.72	
95	5	5	Andrei Tamir	Mongolia	25.80	
96	6	6	Tamatoa Ellacott	Tahiti	25.99	
97	4	2	Andrey Molchanov	Turkmenistan	26.05	
97	5	2	Earlando Mcrae	Guyana	26.05	
99	1	2	Ganbold Urnultsaikhan	Mongolia	26.09	
100	5	6	Chisela Kanchela	Zambia	26.10	
101	5	4	Cole Shade	Cameroon	26.22	
102	7	5	Remigio Chilanle	Mozambique	26.31	
103	5	7	Steven Mangroo	Seychelles	26.37	
104	5	8	Orkhan Samadov	Azerbaijan	26.69	
105	4	1	Ian Taylor	Marshall Islands	27.00	
106	3	1	Joshua Marfleet	Samoa	27.30	
107	3	4	Kerson Hadley	Federated States of Micronesia	27.34	
108	4	4	Issam Halawani	Palestine	27.48	
109	2	6	Tony D Augustine	Federated States of Micronesia	28.14	
110	4	6	Gilbert Kaburu	Uganda	28.16	
111	4	7	Bounthanom Vongphachanh	Laos	28.28	
112	2	4	Michael Taylor	Marshall Islands	28.45	
113	3	5	Khaykeo Viengmany	Laos	28.48	
114	3	6	Leonce Sekamana	Rwanda	29.20	
115	2	3	Malique Williams	Netherlands Antilles	30.73	
116	3	3	Modou Gaye	Mauritania	30.97	
117	3	7	Hassan Shah	Maldives	31.44	
–	1	4	Kyaw Moe Aung	Myanmar	DNS	
–	1	6	Christian W Tamini	Burkina Faso	DNS	
–	2	5	A Lamine Alhousseini	Niger	DNS	
–	2	7	Romain A Aziz Belemtougri	Burkina Faso	DNS	
–	3	2	Patrick Chea	Liberia	DNS	
–	3	8	Kodjovi Mawuena Kowouvi	Togo	DNS	
–	4	3	Gibrilla Bamba	Sierra Leone	DNS	
–	4	5	Donnie Defreitas	Saint Vincent and the Grenadines	DNS	
–	4	8	Richilieu Jackson	Liberia	DNS	
–	5	1	Ibrahim Maliki Amadou	Niger	DNS	
–	6	1	Leonel Matonse	Mozambique	DNS	
–	8	3	Islam Kazi Monirul	Bangladesh	DNS	
–	12	1	Jakob Andkjær	Denmark	DNS	
–	13	1	Tiago Venâncio	Portugal	DNS	
–	14	3	Maran Cruz	Puerto Rico	DNS	
–	16	8	Vyacheslav Shyrshov	Ukraine	DNS	

==== Swim-off ====
Rank	Lane	Name	Nationality	Time	Notes
1	5	Andrey Kapralov	Russia	22.29	
2	4	Mark Veens	Netherlands	22.51	

=== Semifinals ===
Rank	Heat	Lane	Name	Nationality	Time	Notes
1	2	6	Roland Schoeman	South Africa	22.09	
2	2	4	Bartosz Kizierowski	Poland	22.14	
2	2	5	Salim Iles	Algeria	22.14	
4	1	1	Eduard Lorente	Spain	22.19	
4	2	2	Nick Brunelli	United States	22.19	
6	1	3	Duje Draganja	Croatia	22.20	
6	1	8	Andrey Kapralov	Russia	22.20	
8	1	4	Frédérick Bousquet	France	22.26	
9	1	5	Julien Sicot	France	22.31	
10	1	6	Javier Noriega	Spain	22.35	
10	2	3	Oleksandr Volynets	Ukraine	22.35	
12	2	8	Stefan Nystrand	Sweden	22.44	
13	2	1	Brett Hawke	Australia	22.47	
14	2	7	Lukasz Gasior	Poland	22.54	
15	1	2	Peter Mankoč	Slovenia	22.61	
16	1	7	Yevgeny Lagunov	Russia	22.72	

=== Final ===
Rank	Lane	Name	Nationality	Time	Notes
1st place, gold medalist(s)	4	Roland Schoeman	South Africa	21.69	CR, AF
2nd place, silver medalist(s)	7	Duje Draganja	Croatia	21.89	
3rd place, bronze medalist(s)	5	Bartosz Kizierowski	Poland	21.94	
4	3	Salim Iles	Algeria	22.15	
5	1	Andrey Kapralov	Russia	22.16	
6	2	Nick Brunelli	United States	22.25	
7	8	Frédérick Bousquet	France	22.44	
8	6	Eduard Lorente	Spain	22.46	
