= Swimming at the 2004 Summer Olympics – Men's 50 metre freestyle =

Men's 50 metre freestyle at the Games of the XXVIII Olympiad
- Venue: Athens Olympic Aquatic Centre
- Dates: August 19, 2004 (heats & semifinals); August 20, 2004 (final)
- Competitors: 86 from 78 nations
- Winning time: 21.93

Medalists
1st place, gold medalist(s)		Gary Hall Jr.	United States
2nd place, silver medalist(s)		Duje Draganja	Croatia
3rd place, bronze medalist(s)		Roland Schoeman	South Africa

The men's 50 metre freestyle event at the 2004 Summer Olympics was contested at the Olympic Aquatic Centre of the Athens Olympic Sports Complex in Athens, Greece on August 19 and 20.

United States' Gary Hall Jr. defended his Olympic title in the event in 21.93, just two hundredths of a second off the record set by Alexander Popov in 1992. The silver medal was awarded to Croatia's Duje Draganja, who placed behind Hall in 21.94. South Africa's Roland Schoeman completed his full set of medals by adding a bronze in 22.02.

Defending bronze medalist Pieter van den Hoogenband of the Netherlands (22.56), and dual Olympic champion Alexander Popov of Russia (22.58) missed the semifinals. By the following year, Popov announced his retirement from swimming, and became a full-time member of the International Olympic Committee.

Eleven first round heats were raced, comprising a total of 86 swimmers. The fastest 16 swimmers from this group qualified to move on to the semifinals stage. After the heats had been raced, the cut-off time was 22.53 seconds. The 16 swimmers who advanced then raced in two semifinals of eight swimmers each, the results being pooled and the fastest eight swimmers advancing to the final. The cut-off time to proceed into the final was 22.19 seconds.

== Records ==
Prior to this competition, the existing world and Olympic records were as follows.

World record	Alexander Popov (RUS)	21.64	Moscow, Russia	16 June 2000
Olympic record	Alexander Popov (EUN)	21.91	Barcelona, Spain	30 July 1992

== Competition format ==
The competition consisted of three rounds: heats, semifinals, and a final. The swimmers with the best 16 times in the heats advanced to the semifinals. The swimmers with the best 8 times in the semifinals advanced to the final. Swim-offs were used as necessary to break ties for advancement to the next round.

== Results ==
The swimmers with the top 16 times, regardless of heat, advanced to the semifinals.

=== Heats ===
Rank	Heat	Lane	Name	Nation	Time	Notes
1	11	4	Gary Hall Jr.	United States	22.04	Q
2	10	8	Frédérick Bousquet	France	22.24	Q
3	9	3	Bartosz Kizierowski	Poland	22.26	Q
3	11	8	Salim Iles	Algeria	22.26	Q, NR
5	8	5	Duje Draganja	Croatia	22.28	Q
6	9	6	Julien Sicot	France	22.30	Q
7	9	4	Jason Lezak	United States	22.33	Q
8	11	5	Roland Schoeman	South Africa	22.41	Q
8	11	2	Oleksandr Volynets	Ukraine	22.41	Q
10	9	2	Brett Hawke	Australia	22.42	Q
10	11	1	Stefan Nystrand	Sweden	22.42	Q
12	8	4	Ricardo Busquets	Puerto Rico	22.45	Q
13	8	2	Karel Novy	Switzerland	22.51	Q
14	9	5	Javier Noriega	Spain	22.52	Q
14	10	7	Fernando Scherer	Brazil	22.52	Q
16	11	6	Lyndon Ferns	South Africa	22.53	Q
17	11	3	Pieter van den Hoogenband	Netherlands	22.56	
18	10	3	Johan Kenkhuis	Netherlands	22.58	
18	10	4	Alexander Popov	Russia	22.58	
18	8	6	Rafed El-Masri	Syria	22.58	
21	7	1	Rolandas Gimbutis	Lithuania	22.59	
22	10	2	Lorenzo Vismara	Italy	22.70	
23	10	5	Eduardo Lorente	Spain	22.71	
24	7	3	Apostolos Tsagkarakis	Greece	22.72	
25	9	1	Michele Scarica	Italy	22.80	
26	11	7	Ashley Callus	Australia	22.82	
27	9	7	José Meolans	Argentina	22.90	
28	10	6	Vyacheslav Shyrshov	Ukraine	22.96	
29	9	8	Andrey Kapralov	Russia	22.97	
30	10	1	Matthew Rose	Canada	23.01	
31	7	6	Milorad Čavić	Serbia and Montenegro	23.05	
32	6	2	Krisztián Takács	Hungary	23.12	
33	6	1	Stanislau Neviarouski	Belarus	23.13	
34	8	7	Marcos Hernández	Cuba	23.19	
35	7	2	Lee Chung-hee	South Korea	23.20	
36	7	7	Camilo Becerra	Colombia	23.23	
36	7	4	Pedro Silva	Portugal	23.23	
36	5	7	Ravil Nachaev	Uzbekistan	23.23	
39	6	8	Kaan Tayla	Turkey	23.26	
40	5	4	Carl Probert	Fiji	23.31	
41	7	5	Jere Hård	Finland	23.33	
42	7	3	Chen Zuo	China	23.41	
43	6	3	Julio Santos	Ecuador	23.43	
43	5	6	Joshua Laban	Virgin Islands	23.43	
45	6	4	Chrysanthos Papachrysanthou	Cyprus	23.51	
46	5	1	Allen Ong	Malaysia	23.52	
46	6	6	Arwut Chinnapasaen	Thailand	23.52	
48	6	7	Wang Shao-an	Chinese Taipei	23.54	
49	6	5	Danil Haustov	Estonia	23.56	
50	4	4	José Mafio	Uruguay	23.58	
51	4	5	Jevon Atkinson	Jamaica	23.61	
52	5	2	Raichin Antonov	Bulgaria	23.67	
53	4	6	Rodrigo Díaz	Guatemala	23.69	
54	5	5	Örn Arnarson	Iceland	23.84	
55	5	8	Oleg Shteynikov	Kazakhstan	23.88	
56	4	3	Terrence Haynes	Barbados	23.90	
57	4	8	Abed Rahman Kaaki	Lebanon	24.68	
58	4	2	Gregory Arkhurst	Ivory Coast	24.82	
58	4	7	Mauricio Prudencio	Bolivia	24.82	
60	4	1	Alois Dansou	Benin	24.86	
61	1	4	Emile Rony Bakale	Republic of the Congo	25.07	
62	3	5	Chris Hackel	Mauritius	25.33	
63	1	3	Ahmed Mohamed Jewel	Bangladesh	25.47	
64	3	4	Cole Shade Sule	Cameroon	26.16	
65	3	3	Johnathan Steele	Grenada	26.40	
66	3	6	Kreshnik Gjata	Albania	26.61	
66	5	3	Semen Danilov	Kyrgyzstan	26.61	
68	2	4	Anderson Bonabart	Federated States of Micronesia	26.75	
69	1	2	Ibrahim Maliki	Niger	26.81	
70	3	8	Hem Kiri	Cambodia	27.49	
71	3	2	Khaled Ghezzawi	Libya	27.55	
72	2	3	Hojamamed Hojamamedov	Turkmenistan	27.68	
73	3	1	Hassan Mubah	Maldives	27.71	
74	1	7	Donnie Defreitas	Saint Vincent and the Grenadines	27.72	
75	3	7	Edgar Luberenga	Uganda	27.77	
76	1	5	Abdourahamane Diawara	Guinea	28.10	
77	2	5	Bounthanom Vongphachanh	Laos	28.17	
78	2	7	Leonce Sekama	Rwanda	28.99	
79	1	6	David Keita	Mali	29.96	
80	2	2	Mohamed Saad	Yemen	29.97	
81	2	6	Mamadou Ouedraogo	Burkina Faso	30.36	
82	2	8	Malique Williams	Antigua and Barbuda	32.86	
83	2	1	Yona Walesi	Malawi	34.11	
–	8	1	Luis Rojas	Venezuela	DNS	
–	8	3	Peter Mankoč	Slovenia	DNS	
–	8	8	George Bovell	Trinidad and Tobago	DNS	

=== Semifinals ===
The swimmers with the top 8 times, regardless of heat, advanced to the final.

Rank	Heat	Lane	Name	Nation	Time	Notes
1	1	6	Roland Schoeman	South Africa	21.99	Q, AF
2	1	2	Brett Hawke	Australia	22.07	Q, OC
3	2	6	Jason Lezak	United States	22.12	Q
4	1	5	Salim Iles	Algeria	22.16	Q, NR
5	2	2	Gary Hall Jr.	United States	22.18	Q
5	2	4	Stefan Nystrand	Sweden	22.18	Q
5	2	7	Oleksandr Volynets	Ukraine	22.18	Q
8	2	3	Duje Draganja	Croatia	22.19	Q
9	2	5	Bartosz Kizierowski	Poland	22.22	
10	1	3	Julien Sicot	France	22.26	
11	2	8	Fernando Scherer	Brazil	22.27	
12	1	4	Frédérick Bousquet	France	22.29	
13	1	1	Javier Noriega	Spain	22.36	
14	1	8	Lyndon Ferns	South Africa	22.46	
15	1	7	Ricardo Busquets	Puerto Rico	22.52	
16	2	1	Karel Novy	Switzerland	22.63	

=== Final ===
Rank	Lane	Name	Nation	Time	Notes
1st place, gold medalist(s)	2	Gary Hall Jr.	United States	21.93	
2nd place, silver medalist(s)	8	Duje Draganja	Croatia	21.94	
3rd place, bronze medalist(s)	4	Roland Schoeman	South Africa	22.02	
4	1	Stefan Nystrand	Sweden	22.08	
5	3	Jason Lezak	United States	22.11	
6	5	Brett Hawke	Australia	22.18	
7	7	Oleksandr Volynets	Ukraine	22.26	
8	6	Salim Iles	Algeria	22.37	
