= Swimming at the 2004 Summer Olympics – Men's 100 metre freestyle =

Men's 100 metre freestyle at the Games of the XXVIII Olympiad
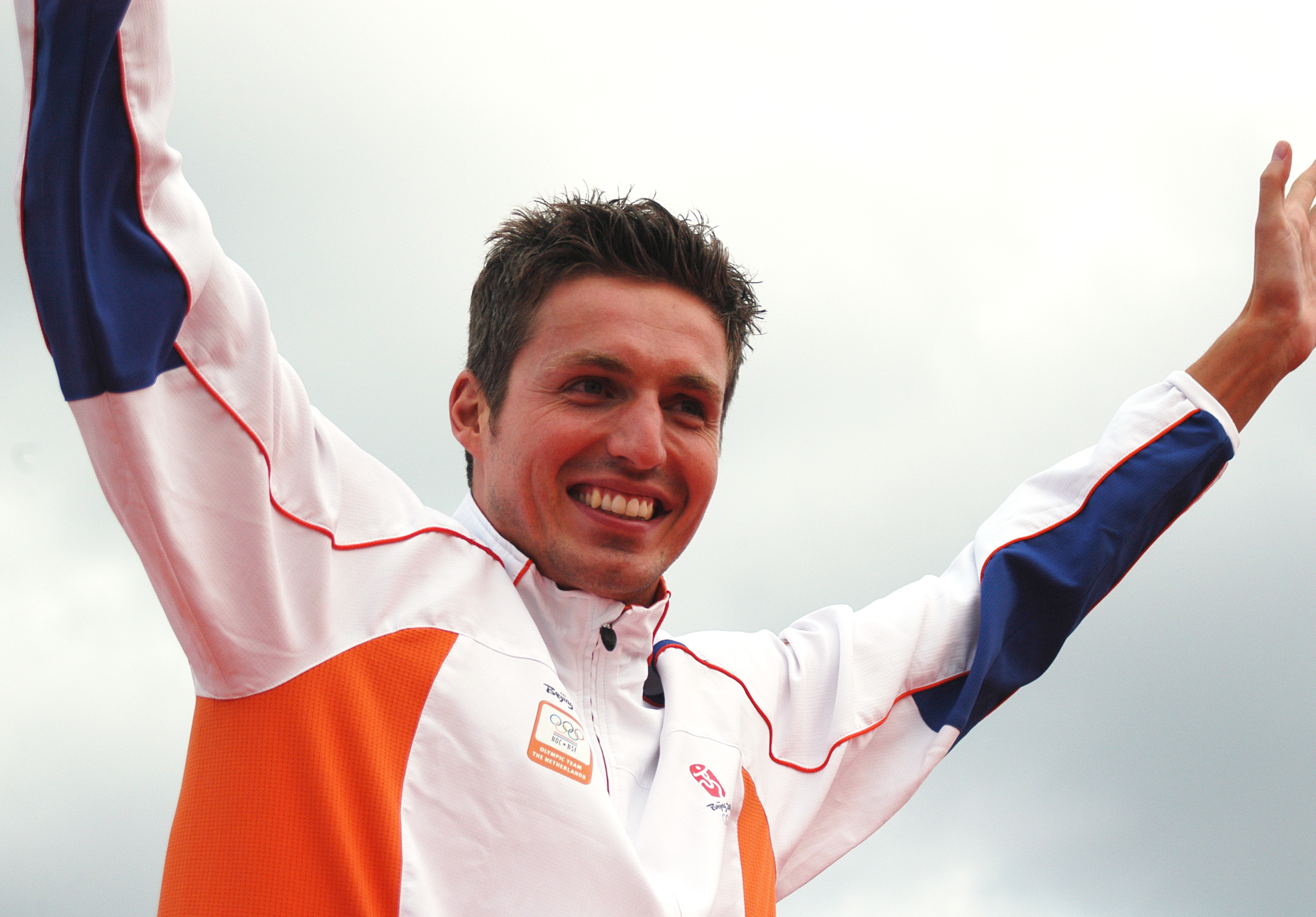
- Pieter van den Hoogenband (2008)
- Venue: Athens Olympic Aquatic Centre
- Dates: August 17, 2004 (heats & semifinals); August 18, 2004 (final)
- Competitors: 69 from 62 nations
- Winning time: 48.17

Medalists
1st place, gold medalist(s)		Pieter van den Hoogenband; Netherlands
2nd place, silver medalist(s)		Roland Schoeman; South Africa
3rd place, bronze medalist(s)		Ian Thorpe; Australia

The men's 100 metre freestyle event at the 2004 Summer Olympics was contested at the Olympic Aquatic Centre of the Athens Olympic Sports Complex in Athens, Greece on August 17 and 18. There were 69 competitors from 62 nations. Nations had been limited to two swimmers each since the 1984 Games.

== Summary ==
Dutch swimmer Pieter van den Hoogenband defended his Olympic title in the event (the fourth man to do so), outside the record time of 48.17. Roland Schoeman, who solidified South Africa's triumph to break a world record in the 400 m freestyle relay, took home the silver in 48.23. It was South Africa's first medal in the event. Australia's Ian Thorpe edged out Schoeman's teammate Ryk Neethling to clinch a bronze medal by 0.07 of a second, in his personal best of 48.56. Australia had not earned a medal in the men's 100 metre freestyle since 1984. Thorpe was the first man to win medals in the 100, 200, and 400 metre freestyle races in a single Olympics.

Two-time Olympic champion Alexander Popov finished only in ninth place by just two hundredths of a second (0.02) outside the top 8 field from the semifinals (49.23). By the following year, Popov announced his retirement from swimming, and became a full-time member of the International Olympic Committee. Other notable swimmers who missed the final cut featured France's Frédérick Bousquet, Lithuania's Rolandas Gimbutis, Trinidad and Tobago's George Bovell, and U.S. duo Jason Lezak and Ian Crocker. This became the first 100m freestyle where not a single American qualified for the semifinals.

== Background ==
This was the twenty-fourth appearance of the men's 100 metre freestyle. The event has been held at every Summer Olympics except 1900 (when the shortest freestyle was the 200 metres), though the 1904 version was measured in yards rather than metres.

Two of the eight finalists from the 2000 Games returned: gold medalist Pieter van den Hoogenband of the Netherlands and silver medalist (and 1992 and 1996 gold medalist) Alexander Popov of Russia. Van den Hoogenband had placed second at the last two world championships, behind American Anthony Ervin (who had retired in 2003 at age 22) in 2001 and Popov in 2003. Ian Thorpe of Australia, primarily a middle-distance swimmer who had not competed in the 100 in 2000 when he won five gold medals, had shown ability in sprinting by placing third in the 2003 world championship.

Azerbaijan, Burundi, Guyana, Iraq, Latvia, Pakistan, Papua New Guinea, and Serbia and Montenegro each made their debut in the event. The United States made its 23rd appearance, most of any nation, having missed only the boycotted 1980 Games.

== Competition format ==
This freestyle swimming competition consisted of three rounds: heats, semifinals, and a final. The swimmers with the best 16 times in the heats advanced to the semifinals. The swimmers with the best 8 times in the semifinals advanced to the final. Swim-offs were used as necessary to break ties for advancement to the next round.

== Records ==
Prior to this competition, the existing world and Olympic records were as follows.

World record	Pieter van den Hoogenband (NED)	47.84	Sydney, Australia	19 September 2000
Olympic record	Pieter van den Hoogenband (NED)	47.84	Sydney, Australia	19 September 2000

== Schedule ==
All times are Greece Standard Time (UTC+2)

Date	Time	Round
Tuesday, 17 August 2004	10:00; 19:30	Heats; Semifinals
Wednesday, 18 August 2004	20:20	Final

== Results ==
=== Heats ===
Rank	Heat	Lane	Swimmer	Nation	Time	Notes
1	7	4	Pieter van den Hoogenband	Netherlands	48.70	Q
2	5	4	Rolandas Gimbutis	Lithuania	48.85	Q
2	7	5	Ryk Neethling	South Africa	48.85	Q
4	6	1	Duje Draganja	Croatia	49.07	Q
5	7	2	Frédérick Bousquet	France	49.08	Q
6	8	5	Ian Thorpe	Australia	49.17	Q
7	9	1	Romain Barnier	France	49.49	Q
8	9	5	Alexander Popov	Russia	49.51	Q
9	8	3	Andrey Kapralov	Russia	49.52	Q
10	7	7	Peter Mankoč	Slovenia	49.54	Q
11	9	3	Filippo Magnini	Italy	49.58	Q
12	8	8	George Bovell	Trinidad and Tobago	49.61	Q
13	8	4	Roland Schoeman	South Africa	49.68	Q
14	6	2	Luis Rojas	Venezuela	49.69	Q
15	7	1	Torsten Spanneberg	Germany	49.71	Q
16	9	2	Salim Iles	Algeria	49.72	Q
17	6	6	Yuriy Yegoshin	Ukraine	49.73	
17	7	3	Ian Crocker	United States	49.73	
19	8	1	Milorad Čavić	Serbia and Montenegro	49.74	
20	6	8	Stefan Nystrand	Sweden	49.75	
21	9	4	Jason Lezak	United States	49.87	
22	6	4	Karel Novy	Switzerland	49.93	
23	6	5	Matthew Kidd	Great Britain	49.97	
24	9	7	José Meolans	Argentina	49.98	
25	8	2	Lorenzo Vismara	Italy	50.03	
26	9	8	Tiago Venâncio	Portugal	50.18	
27	5	8	Yoshihiro Okumura	Japan	50.24	
28	6	3	Attila Zubor	Hungary	50.26	
29	5	6	Stanislau Neviarouski	Belarus	50.36	
30	8	7	Eduardo Lorente	Spain	50.48	
31	8	6	Ashley Callus	Australia	50.56	
32	5	5	Aristeidis Grigoriadis	Greece	50.61	
33	6	7	Jader Souza	Brazil	50.67	
33	5	2	Matti Rajakylä	Finland	50.67	
35	4	6	Romāns Miloslavskis	Latvia	50.94	
36	9	6	Stephan Kunzelmann	Germany	50.98	
37	5	3	Danil Haustov	Estonia	51.02	
38	4	2	Alexandros Aresti	Cyprus	51.10	
39	4	5	Ryan Pini	Papua New Guinea	51.11	
40	3	3	Carl Probert	Fiji	51.42	
41	4	3	Paul Kutscher	Uruguay	51.45	
42	4	4	Kaan Tayla	Turkey	51.52	
43	5	1	Cameron Gibson	New Zealand	51.56	
44	4	1	George Gleason	Virgin Islands	51.69	
45	3	4	Lee Chung-hee	South Korea	51.74	
45	3	1	Ismael Ortiz	Panama	51.74	
47	2	3	Octavian Guţu	Moldova	51.84	
48	3	5	Damian Alleyne	Barbados	51.89	
49	3	6	Max Schnettler	Chile	51.91	
50	4	7	Allen Ong	Malaysia	52.04	
51	3	2	Vyacheslav Titarenko	Kazakhstan	52.09	
52	4	8	Raichin Antonov	Bulgaria	52.33	
53	2	5	Camilo Becerra	Colombia	52.57	
54	3	8	Wu Nien-pin	Chinese Taipei	52.58	
55	2	6	Željko Panić	Bosnia and Herzegovina	52.75	
56	3	7	Mark Chay	Singapore	52.83	
57	2	4	Aleksandr Agafonov	Uzbekistan	52.92	
58	2	1	Obaid Al Jasmi	United Arab Emirates	54.17	
59	2	7	Onan Orlando Thom	Guyana	55.24	
60	5	7	Huang Shaohua	China	55.46	
61	2	2	Babak Farhoudi	Iran	56.42	
62	2	8	Jean Laurent Ravera	Monaco	56.47	
63	1	2	Mohammed Abbas	Iraq	56.81	
64	1	6	Tamir Andryei	Mongolia	57.29	
65	1	7	Leonel Matonse	Mozambique	57.79	
66	1	4	Hesham Shehab	Bahrain	57.94	
67	1	3	Sergey Dyachkov	Azerbaijan	58.26	
68	1	5	Mumtaz Ahmed	Pakistan	59.19	
69	1	1	Emery Nziyunvira	Burundi	1:09.40	
—	7	6	Brent Hayden	Canada	DNS	
—	7	8	Rick Say	Canada	DNS	

=== Semifinals ===
Rank	Heat	Lane	Swimmer	Nation	Time	Notes
1	2	1	Roland Schoeman	South Africa	48.39	Q
2	2	4	Pieter van den Hoogenband	Netherlands	48.55	Q
3	2	7	Filippo Magnini	Italy	48.91	Q
4	2	2	Andrey Kapralov	Russia	49.12	Q
5	1	8	Salim Iles	Algeria	49.13	Q
6	1	5	Duje Draganja	Croatia	49.14	Q
7	2	5	Ryk Neethling	South Africa	49.18	Q
8	1	3	Ian Thorpe	Australia	49.21	Q
9	1	6	Alexander Popov	Russia	49.23	
10	2	3	Frédérick Bousquet	France	49.25	
11	1	7	George Bovell	Trinidad and Tobago	49.53	
12	2	6	Romain Barnier	France	49.63	
13	1	2	Peter Mankoč	Slovenia	49.71	
14	1	4	Rolandas Gimbutis	Lithuania	49.75	
15	1	1	Luis Rojas	Venezuela	49.85	
16	2	8	Torsten Spanneberg	Germany	49.88	

=== Final ===
Rank	Lane	Swimmer	Nation	Time	Notes
1st place, gold medalist(s)	5	Pieter van den Hoogenband	Netherlands	48.17	
2nd place, silver medalist(s)	4	Roland Schoeman	South Africa	48.23	
3rd place, bronze medalist(s)	8	Ian Thorpe	Australia	48.56	
4	1	Ryk Neethling	South Africa	48.63	
5	3	Filippo Magnini	Italy	48.99	
6	7	Duje Draganja	Croatia	49.23	
7	2	Salim Iles	Algeria	49.30	
7	6	Andrey Kapralov	Russia	49.30	
