= Swimming at the 2004 Summer Olympics – Men's 100 metre backstroke =

Men's 100 metre backstroke at the Games of the XXVIII Olympiad
- Venue: Athens Olympic Aquatic Centre
- Dates: August 15, 2004 (heats & semifinals); August 16, 2004 (final)
- Competitors: 45 from 39 nations
- Winning time: 54.06

Medalists
1st place, gold medalist(s)		Aaron Peirsol	United States
2nd place, silver medalist(s)		Markus Rogan	Austria
3rd place, bronze medalist(s)		Tomomi Morita	Japan

The men's 100 metre backstroke event at the 2004 Olympic Games was contested at the Olympic Aquatic Centre of the Athens Olympic Sports Complex in Athens, Greece on August 15 and 16.

U.S. swimmer Aaron Peirsol won a gold medal in this event, outside an Olympic record time of 54.06 seconds. Markus Rogan captured Austria's first ever medal in swimming after a hundred years, earning the silver at 54.35. Japan's Tomomi Morita, on the other hand, edged out defending Olympic champion and world record holder Lenny Krayzelburg to take a bronze by two hundredths of a second (0.02), breaking an Asian record time of 54.36 seconds.

== Records ==
Prior to this competition, the existing world and Olympic records were as follows:

World record	Lenny Krayzelburg (USA)	53.60	Sydney, Australia	22 August 1999
Olympic record	Lenny Krayzelburg (USA)	53.72	Sydney, Australia	17 September 2000

== Results ==
=== Heats ===
Rank	Heat	Lane	Name	Nationality	Time	Notes
1	6	3	Tomomi Morita	Japan	54.41	Q
2	6	4	Aaron Peirsol	United States	54.65	Q
3	4	6	László Cseh	Hungary	54.80	Q
4	5	3	Markus Rogan	Austria	54.87	Q
4	6	5	Lenny Krayzelburg	United States	54.87	Q
6	5	5	Steffen Driesen	Germany	54.92	Q
7	4	4	Arkady Vyatchanin	Russia	55.17	Q
8	6	6	Alex Lim	Malaysia	55.22	Q
9	5	4	Matt Welsh	Australia	55.35	Q
10	4	5	Ouyang Kunpeng	China	55.50	Q
11	4	3	Marco di Carli	Germany	55.58	Q
12	5	1	Gerhard Zandberg	South Africa	55.62	Q
13	6	7	Simon Dufour	France	55.76	Q
14	5	6	Gregor Tait	Great Britain	55.77	Q
14	6	1	Răzvan Florea	Romania	55.77	Q
16	3	5	Gordan Kožulj	Croatia	55.80	Q
17	3	2	Aristeidis Grigoriadis	Greece	55.85	
17	5	2	Josh Watson	Australia	55.85	
19	4	2	Yevgeny Aleshin	Russia	55.91	
20	3	6	Ryan Pini	Papua New Guinea	55.97	
21	5	8	Pierre Roger	France	56.07	
22	4	7	Cameron Gibson	New Zealand	56.14	
23	4	1	Adam Mania	Poland	56.20	
24	3	3	Darius Grigalionis	Lithuania	56.21	
25	2	5	Nicholas Neckles	Barbados	56.32	
26	3	7	Derya Büyükuncu	Turkey	56.34	
27	2	6	Ľuboš Križko	Slovakia	56.62	
27	4	8	Volodymyr Nikolaychuk	Ukraine	56.62	
27	5	7	Matthew Rose	Canada	56.62	
30	2	4	Sung Min	South Korea	56.78	
31	3	4	Ahmed Hussein	Egypt	56.86	
32	3	1	Paulo Machado	Brazil	57.07	
33	3	8	Eduardo German Otero	Argentina	57.28	
34	6	8	Péter Horváth	Hungary	57.29	
35	6	2	Aschwin Wildeboer	Spain	57.35	
36	2	2	Matti Mäki	Finland	57.57	
37	2	3	George Gleason	Virgin Islands	57.64	
38	1	3	Chris Vythoulkas	Bahamas	58.31	NR
39	2	1	Brendan Ashby	Zimbabwe	58.91	
40	2	7	Igor Beretić	Serbia and Montenegro	59.38	
41	1	4	Stanislav Osinsky	Kazakhstan	59.92	
42	1	5	Alexandru Ivlev	Moldova	1:00.13	
43	2	8	Danil Bugakov	Uzbekistan	1:02.28	
44	1	6	Omar Abu Fares	Jordan	1:02.36	
	1	2	Donnie Defreitas	Saint Vincent and the Grenadines	DNS	

=== Semifinals ===
==== Semifinal 1 ====
Rank	Lane	Name	Nationality	Time	Notes
1	4	Aaron Peirsol	United States	54.34	Q
2	5	Markus Rogan	Austria	54.42	Q
3	3	Steffen Driesen	Germany	54.64	Q
4	2	Ouyang Kunpeng	China	55.28	
5	1	Gregor Tait	Great Britain	55.31	
6	7	Gerhard Zandberg	South Africa	55.76	
7	8	Gordan Kožulj	Croatia	56.02	
8	6	Alex Lim	Malaysia	56.08	

==== Semifinal 2 ====
Rank	Lane	Name	Nationality	Time	Notes
1	4	Tomomi Morita	Japan	54.62	Q
2	3	Lenny Krayzelburg	United States	54.63	Q
3	2	Matt Welsh	Australia	54.69	Q
4	5	László Cseh	Hungary	54.86	Q
5	7	Marco di Carli	Germany	55.03	Q
6	6	Arkady Vyatchanin	Russia	55.20	
7	8	Răzvan Florea	Romania	55.27	
8	1	Simon Dufour	France	56.15	

=== Final ===
Rank	Lane	Name	Nationality	Time	Notes
1st place, gold medalist(s)	4	Aaron Peirsol	United States	54.06	
2nd place, silver medalist(s)	5	Markus Rogan	Austria	54.35	
3rd place, bronze medalist(s)	3	Tomomi Morita	Japan	54.36	AS
4	6	Lenny Krayzelburg	United States	54.38	
5	7	Matt Welsh	Australia	54.52	
6	1	László Cseh	Hungary	54.61	
7	2	Steffen Driesen	Germany	54.63	
8	8	Marco di Carli	Germany	55.27	
