= Dyachkov =

Dyachkov (Russian: Дьячков) is a Russian masculine surname, its feminine counterpart is Dyachkova. It is a patronymic surname literally meaning "son/daughter of dyachok" It may refer to:

- Maria Dyatchkova (born 1982), Russian football player
- Natalya Dyachkova, Russian kickboxer
- Sergey Dyachkov (born 1982), Azerbaijani swimmer
- Yevgeni Dyachkov (born 1975), Russian football player
- Yuri Dyachkov (born 1940), Soviet Olympic decathlete
