= Hem Kiry =

Cambodian swimmer

Personal information
- Full name: Hem Kiry
- National team: Cambodia
- Born: 11 April 1980 (age 46) Phnom Penh, PR Kampuchea
- Height: 1.75 m (5 ft 9 in)
- Weight: 80 kg (176 lb)

Sport
- Sport: Swimming
- Strokes: Freestyle

Hem Kiry (born April 11, 1980) is a Cambodian former swimmer, who specialized in sprint freestyle events. He is a two-time Olympian (2000 and 2004), and served twice as Cambodia's flag bearer in the opening ceremony. He also held a Cambodian record of 26.48 in the 50 m freestyle from the Southeast Asian Games. Hem is currently working as a swimming coach for the Cambodia national team.

Hem made his official debut at the 2000 Summer Olympics in Sydney, where he competed in the men's 50 m freestyle. Swimming in heat two, he posted a lifetime best of 26.41 to earn a fifth spot and sixty-sixth overall by a 1.08-second margin behind winner Jamie Peterkin of Saint Lucia.

At the 2004 Summer Olympics in Athens, Hem swam for the second time in the 50 m freestyle. As part of an Olympic Solidarity program, he received a Universality place from FINA in an entry time of 27.56. He challenged seven other swimmers in heat three, including 16-year-old Chris Hackel of Mauritius. He edged out Libya's Khaled Ghezzawi to take another fifth spot by six hundredths of a second in 27.49. Hem failed to advance into the semifinals, as he placed seventieth overall out of 86 swimmers in the preliminaries.

He is a son of Hem Thon (1943–2015), who was also a swimmer. His siblings, sister Hem Raksmey and brother Hem Thon Ponloeu are also swimmers.
