= Draganja =

Draganja (Croatian pronunciation: [drǎɡaɲa]) is a Croatian surname. Notable people with the surname include:

- Duje Draganja (born 1983), Croatian retired swimmer
- Marin Draganja (born 1991), Croatian tennis player, older brother of Tomislav
- Tomislav Draganja (born 1994), Croatian tennis player, younger brother of Marin
