= Ravera =

Ravera is a surname. Notable people with the surname include:

- Camilla Ravera (1889–1988), Italian politician and the first female lifetime senator.
- Gina Ravera (born 1966), American actress
- Jean Laurent Ravera (born 1979), Monegasque swimmer
- Lidia Ravera (born 1951), Italian writer, journalist, essayist and screenwriter
- Élodie Ravera-Scaramozzino (born 1995), French rower
