= Abdourahamane Diawara =

Guinean swimmer

Personal information
- Full name: Abdourahamane Diawara
- National team: Guinea
- Born: 30 September 1978 (age 47) Fria, Guinea
- Height: 1.81 m (5 ft 11 in)
- Weight: 80 kg (176 lb)

Sport
- Sport: Swimming
- Strokes: Freestyle

Abdourahamane Diawara (born September 30, 1978) is a Guinean former swimmer, who specialized in sprint freestyle events. Diawara qualified for the men's 50 m freestyle, as Guinea's only swimmer, at the 2004 Summer Olympics in Athens, without having an entry time. He challenged five other swimmers in heat one, including 16-year-old Emile Rony Bakale of Congo. He posted a lifetime best of 28.10 to save a fifth spot over Mali's David Keita by more than a second. Diawara failed to advance into the semifinals, as he placed seventy-sixth overall out of 86 swimmers in the preliminaries.
