= Johnathan Steele =

Grenadian swimmer (born 1984)

Personal information
- Full name: Johnathan Andrew Steele
- National team: Grenada
- Born: 25 June 1984 (age 42) St. Georges, Grenada
- Height: 1.90 m (6 ft 3 in)
- Weight: 85 kg (187 lb)

Sport
- Sport: Swimming
- Strokes: Freestyle
- College team: Duquesne
- Coach: Dave Bocci

Johnathan Andrew Steele (born June 25, 1984) is a Grenadian former swimmer, who specialized in sprint freestyle events. He held numerous age group titles for Grenada in the 50, 100, and 200 m freestyle, and was also chosen as the nation's student athlete for the Olympic Youth Camp, when Australia hosted the 2000 Summer Olympics in Sydney.

Steele qualified for the men's 50 m freestyle at the 2004 Summer Olympics in Athens, by receiving a Universality place from FINA, in an entry time of 26.34. He challenged seven other swimmers in heat three, including 16-year-old Chris Hackel of Mauritius. He raced to third place in 26.40, just 0.06 of a second off his entry time. Steele failed to advance into the semifinals, as he placed sixty-fourth out of 86 swimmers in the preliminaries.
