= Hojamämmet Hojamämmedow =

Turkmen swimmer (born 1986)

Hojamamed Hojamamedov
Personal information
- Full name: Hojamamed Hojamamedov
- National team: Turkmenistan
- Born: 10 June 1986 (age 40)
- Height: 1.75 m (5 ft 9 in)
- Weight: 63 kg (139 lb)

Sport
- Sport: Swimming
- Strokes: Freestyle

Hojamamed Hojamamedov (also Hojamamed Hojamamédow, born June 10, 1986) is a Turkmen swimmer, who specialized in sprint freestyle events. Hojamamedov qualified for the men's 50 m freestyle at the 2004 Summer Olympics in Athens, by receiving a Universality place from FINA in an entry time of 29.07. He challenged seven other swimmers in heat two, including 15-year-old Malique Williams of Antigua and Barbuda. He blasted a Turkmen record of 27.68 to earn a second spot by less than 0.07 of a second behind winner Anderson Bonabart of Micronesia. Hojamamedov failed to advance into the semifinals, as he placed seventy-second overall out of 86 swimmers in the preliminaries.
