= Jean Laurent =

Jean Laurent may refer to:

- Jean Laurent (photographer) (1816–1886), French photographer who worked in Spain
- Jean Laurent (footballer) (1906–1995), French footballer
- Jean Antoine Laurent, miniaturist and painter
- Jean Laurent Ravera, Monegasque swimmer
