= Edgar Luberenga =

Ugandan swimmer (born 1979)

Personal information
- Full name: Edgar Luberenga
- National team: Uganda
- Born: 27 April 1979 (age 47)
- Height: 1.75 m (5 ft 9 in)
- Weight: 70 kg (154 lb)

Sport
- Sport: Swimming
- Strokes: Freestyle

Edgar Luberenga (born April 27, 1979) is a Ugandan former competitive swimmer who specialized in sprint freestyle events. He is best known for representing Uganda at the 2004 Summer Olympics in Athens, where he competed in the men's 50 metre freestyle as the nation's sole swimmer in the sport.

== Early life ==
Luberenga's entry into international competition reflects his status as one of Uganda's leading sprint swimmers in the early 2000s.

== Swimming career ==
Luberenga competed at the 2003 World Aquatics Championships in Barcelona, in the men's 50 metre freestyle. In that event, he posted a time of 27.81 seconds in the heats, an important international race ahead of the Olympics and a marker of his competitive level.

He qualified for the men's 50 metre freestyle, as Uganda's only swimmer at the 2004 Summer Olympics in Athens through a Universality place granted by FINA, a provision designed to allow athletes from developing swimming nations to compete even without meeting the standard qualifying times. His entry time was 27.30 seconds.

At the Olympics, Luberenga swam in heat three of the preliminary round. He outcompeted some other swimmers, including 16-year-old Chris Hackel of Mauritius. Luberenga rounded out the field to last place by six hundredths of a second (0.06) behind Maldives' Hassan Mubah in 27.77 seconds, placing seventh in his heat and 75th overall out of 86 competitors in the preliminaries. Although he did not advance to the semifinals, his participation contributed to Uganda's swimming reputation at the Games, where the country fielded just one swimmer in the sport that year.

Media coverage at the time noted that Luberenga was cleared by the world swimming body to travel to Athens, marking an important opportunity for him and for Uganda's Olympic team.

== Legacy and impact ==
Luberenga is part of a lineage of Ugandan swimmers who participated in the Olympics primarily through universality invitations from the international governing body aiming to broaden global representation in aquatic sports. In the years following his Olympic appearance, Uganda sent swimmers to subsequent Games, including Gilbert Kaburu (2008), Ganza Mugula (2012), and others, often in the 50m freestyle event, a pattern noted in national sports reporting.

Though not medalling, athletes like Luberanga helped maintain Uganda's presence on the Olympic swimming stage and inspired a generation of swimmers from a country with limited aquatic infrastructure.
