= Leonce Sekama =

Rwandan swimmer

Personal information
- Born: 17 November 1980 (age 45)

Sport
- Sport: Swimming

Leonce Sekama (born 17 November 1980) is a Rwandan former swimmer, who specialized in sprint freestyle events. Sekama qualified for the men's 50 m freestyle at the 2004 Summer Olympics in Athens, by receiving a Universality place from FINA in an entry time of 30.57. He challenged seven other swimmers in heat two, including 15-year-old Malique Williams of Antigua and Barbuda. He overhauled a 30-second barrier and posted a lifetime best of 28.99 to earn a fourth spot by a 2.24-second margin behind winner Anderson Bonabart of Micronesia. Sekama failed to advance into the semifinals, as he placed seventy-eighth overall out of 86 swimmers in the preliminaries.
