= Khaled Ghezzawi =

Libyan swimmer (born 1987)

Personal information
- Full name: Khaled Ghezzawi
- National team: Libya
- Born: 9 May 1987 (age 39)
- Height: 1.70 m (5 ft 7 in)
- Weight: 69 kg (152 lb)

Sport
- Sport: Swimming
- Strokes: Freestyle

Khaled Ghezzawi (Arabic: خالد الغزاوي; born May 9, 1987) is a Libyan swimmer, who specialized in sprint freestyle events. Ghezzawi qualified for the men's 50 m freestyle at the 2004 Summer Olympics in Athens, by receiving a Universality place from FINA, in an entry time of 27.00. He challenged seven other swimmers in heat three, including 16-year-old Chris Hackel of Mauritius. He raced to sixth place in 27.55, just 0.55 of a second off his entry time. Ghezzawi failed to advance into the semifinals, as he placed seventy-first overall out of 86 swimmers in the preliminaries.
