= George Gleason =

Personal information
- Full name: George Gleason
- National team: Virgin Islands
- Born: 8 August 1979 (age 46) Saint Croix, U.S. Virgin Islands
- Height: 1.98 m (6 ft 6 in)
- Weight: 100 kg (220 lb)

Sport
- Sport: Swimming
- Strokes: Freestyle, backstroke
- Club: St. Croix Dolphins
- College team: Yale University (U.S.)
- Coach: Frank Keefe (U.S.)

George Gleason (born August 8, 1979) is a former swimmer from the U.S. Virgin Islands, who specialized in freestyle and backstroke events. He is a two-time Olympian (2000 and 2004), a swimming captain for the Yale Bulldogs, and a graduate of sociology (2001) at Yale University in New Haven, Connecticut. Gleason also capped his swimming career by an eleventh-place finish in the 200 m backstroke at the NCAA Swimming Championships in College Station, Texas, earning him All-American honors.

== Career ==
Gleason made his official debut, as U.S. Virgin Islands' only swimmer, at the 2000 Summer Olympics in Sydney. He failed to advance into the semifinals in any of his individual events, placing thirty-ninth in the 200 m freestyle (1:54.64) and forty-second each in the 100 m freestyle (52.00) and 200 m individual medley (2:08.25).

At the 2002 FINA World Swimming Championships (25 m) in Moscow, Gleason tackled an extended program of five swimming events, highlighted by a 16th-place finish in the 200 metre freestyle (1:47.69) where he challenged 8 other swimmers in heat 7, including Olympic medalist George Bovell of Trinidad and Tobago, who out-touched Gleason by 0.03 seconds. Gleason also competed in the 200 metre backstroke (19th overall, 1:58.18), 100 metre individual medley (21st overall, 56.24), 200 metre individual medley (28th overall, 2:02.29), and 50 metre freestyle (37th overall, 23.19).

In the summer of 2003, Gleason competed in the Pan American Games in Santo Domingo, Dominican Republic, where he raced to FINA Olympic B-standard entry times of 51.64 (100 m freestyle) and 57.13 (100 m backstroke). His eighth-place effort in the 100 m backstroke marked his highest result at a major international competition. Gleason also helped the freestyle relay teams (both 100 and 200 m) for the Virgin Islands to sixth-place finishes.

At the 2004 Summer Olympics in Athens, Gleason shortened his program by qualifying for two swimming events. He achieved FINA B-standard entry times of 51.64 (100 m freestyle) and 57.13 (100 m backstroke) from the Pan American Games in Santo Domingo, Dominican Republic.

In the 100 m backstroke, Gleason challenged seven other swimmers in heat two, including Olympic veteran Nicholas Neckles of Barbados. He raced to fifth place and thirty-seventh overall by 0.07 of a second behind Finland's Matti Mäki, outside his entry time of 57.64. In his second event, 100 m freestyle, Gleason placed forty-fourth overall out of 71 swimmers from the morning's preliminaries. He raced to sixth place in heat four at 51.69, just 0.05 of a second off his entry time from the Pan American Games.
