= Semen Danilov =

Kyrgyzstani swimmer

Personal information
- Full name: Semen Danilov
- National team: Kyrgyzstan
- Born: 20 September 1986 (age 39) Frunze, Kirghiz SSR, Soviet Union
- Height: 1.76 m (5 ft 9 in)
- Weight: 60 kg (132 lb)

Sport
- Sport: Swimming
- Strokes: Freestyle

Semen Danilov (also Semyon Danilov, Russian: Семен Данилов; born September 20, 1986) is a Kyrgyz former swimmer, who specialized in sprint freestyle events. Danilov qualified for the men's 50 m freestyle at the 2004 Summer Olympics in Athens, by clearing a FINA B-standard entry time of 23.29 from the Kazakhstan Open Championships in Almaty. He challenged seven other swimmers in heat five, including four-time Olympian Carl Probert of Fiji. He rounded out the field to last place in 26.61, more than three seconds off his entry time. Danilov failed to advance into the semifinals, as he shared a sixty-sixth place tie with Albania's Kreshnik Gjata in the preliminaries.
