= Hesham Shehab =

Bahraini swimmer

Personal information
- Full name: Hesham Shehab
- National team: Bahrain
- Born: 20 April 1988 (age 38)
- Height: 1.72 m (5 ft 8 in)
- Weight: 71 kg (157 lb)

Sport
- Sport: Swimming
- Strokes: Freestyle

Hesham Shehab (Arabic: هشام الشهابي; born April 20, 1988) is a Bahraini swimmer, who specialized in sprint freestyle events. Shehab qualified for the men's 100 m freestyle, as a 16-year-old, at the 2004 Summer Olympics in Athens, by receiving a Universality place from FINA, in an entry time of 57.44. He challenged six other swimmers in heat one, including 34-year-old Mumtaz Ahmed of Pakistan. He raced to fourth place in 57.94, exactly half a second (0.50) off his entry time. Shehab failed to advance into the semifinals, as he placed sixty-sixth overall out of 71 swimmers in the preliminaries.
