= The Race Club =

Swimming club

Coordinates: 24.963529°N 80.567895°W

The Race Club Inc.
- Company type: Private company
- Industry: Club
- Founded: 2003
- Headquarters: 151 Kahiki Drive Tavernier, Florida, USA 33070
- Key people: Gary Hall, Sr., (Co-founder); Gary Hall, Jr., (Co-founder)
- Services: Training
- Website: www.theraceclub.net

The Race Club is a swimming club known for training Olympic Games swimmers with its swimming training program that is focused on specific swimming techniques, located in Islamorada, Florida.

== History ==
The Race Club was founded in 2003 by Gary Hall, Jr., an American swimmer who competed in the 1996, 2000, and 2004 Olympics and won ten Olympic medals (5 gold, 3 silver, 2 bronze).

A managing partner of The Race Club is Gary Hall, Jr.'s father, Gary Hall, Sr., a three-time Olympic medalist (1968, 1972 and 1976) who was voted the World's greatest male swimmer in both 1969 and 1970. At the Montreal 1976 Summer Olympics, Hall's teammates voted him to be the flag bearer who led the U.S. Olympic Team into Olympic Stadium for the Opening ceremonies.

The Halls became the first pair of father and son to each make three Olympic appearances.

In 2004, swimmers from The Race Club won 6 Olympic medals at the Athens Olympic Games. In 2006, The Race Club began offering summer swim camps for swimmers of any age to learn how to swim faster. In 2008, 17 swimmers representing 15 countries that trained with The Race Club competed in the Beijing Olympics. Two more Olympic medals were won. All swam personal best times.

== Swimming training program ==
The Race Club swimming training programs incorporate five disciplines; swim training, strength training, mental training (sport psychology), nutrition and recovery (healing). The Race Club facilities are located at Founders Park in Islamorada, Fla. The 50-meter swimming pool features eight lanes and a 12-foot diving pool.

=== Swimming nutrition ===
To complement the swimming training program, The Race Club offers specialized nutrition for swimmers focused on competitive swimming nutrition.

=== Swimming video ===
The Race club utilizes specialized underwater photography equipment to create swimming technique videos, and can video a swimmer from under water or above the water to analyze swimming strokes underwater and from different angles to improve skill. In addition, The Race Club sells swimming DVDs focused on swimming faster.

== Olympic medalists from The Race Club World Team ==
- Anthony Ervin
- Gary Hall, Sr.
- Gary Hall, Jr.
- Klete Keller
- Nathan Adrian
- Milorad Čavić
- Mirna Jukić
- Duje Draganja
- George Bovell
- Therese Alshammar
- Fernando Scherer

== Olympic team members from The Race Club ==
- Mike Bottom, coach
- Henrique Barbosa
- Guy Barnea
- Ricardo Busquets
- Gordan Kožulj
- Mario Delač
- Brett Hawke
- Michelle Engelsman
- Fabiola Molina
- Mark Foster
- Darren Mew
- Bartosz Kizierowski
- Dominik Meichtry
- Igor Marchenko
