= Igor Beretić =

Serbian swimmer (born 1981)

Personal information
- Born: May 31, 1981 (age 45) Novi Sad, SR Serbia, SFR Yugoslavia

Sport
- Sport: Swimming

Igor Beretić (Serbian Cyrillic: Игор Беретић) (born May 31, 1981) is a Serbian swimmer.

Beretić represented Serbia and Montenegro at the 2004 Summer Olympics. He participated in the men's 100 metre backstroke.

== See also ==
- List of Serbian records in swimming
