= Yona Walesi =

Malawian former swimmer (born 1979)

Personal information
- Full name: Yona Walesi
- National team: Malawi
- Born: 1 December 1979 (age 46)
- Height: 1.79 m (5 ft 10 in)
- Weight: 79 kg (174 lb)

Sport
- Sport: Swimming
- Strokes: Freestyle

Yona Walesi (born December 1, 1979) is a Malawian former swimmer, who specialized in sprint freestyle events. Walesi became one of the first Malawian swimmers to compete at the 2004 Summer Olympics in Athens. He qualified for the men's 50 m freestyle, by receiving a Universality place from FINA in an entry time of 32.08. He challenged seven other swimmers in heat two, including 15-year-old Malique Williams of Antigua and Barbuda. He rounded out the field to last place in 34.11, more than 12 seconds off the top-seeded time set by U.S. swimmer and defending Olympic champion Gary Hall, Jr. Walesi failed to advance into the semifinals, as he placed eighty-third overall out of 86 swimmers in the preliminaries.

Yona also coached the Malawi swimmers at the 2008 and 2012 Olympic Games in Beijing and London respectively. His extensive coaching experience has led to him being appointed head coach of the Malawi National Swimming team in several large meets including the Commonwealth Games, Youth Commonwealth Games, and the Cana Zone 3&4.
