= Valery Gabisoniya =

Russian swimming coach

Valery Borisovich Gabisoniya
- Born: May 29, 1959 (age 67); Sukhumi
- Occupation: Swimming coach
- Years active: 1987 – present
- Awards: Honored Coach of Russia; Excellent Worker of Physical Culture and Sports

Valery Borisovich Gabisoniya (Russian: Валерий Борисович Габисония; born May 29, 1959) is a Russian swimming coach, Master of Sports of the USSR, Honored Coach of Russia, and coach of the Russian national swimming team since 2006.

== Biography ==
Valery Borisovich Gabisoniya was born in the city of Sukhumi. He began swimming from an early age, learning to stay afloat from the age of three. During his school years, he began training under the guidance of Nikolai Ivanovich Yakhiopulo, the head coach of the Abkhazian swimming team. Gabisoniya later stated that Yakhiopulo inspired him to become a coach.

Gabisoniya is a Master of Sports of the USSR in swimming. From 1987 to 1994, he worked as a children's coach in the swimming pool of the sports club "Izhorets" in the Kolpino district of Saint Petersburg. Since 1994, he has been working as a coach and teacher at the College of Olympic Reserve No. 1 of Saint Petersburg.

Over the years of his coaching career, he has trained athletes who have achieved notable results at the Russian and international levels. His students have become medalists at a wide variety of events, including the Olympic Games and national events.

== Notable students ==
- Vladimir Predkin - Honored Master of Sports of Russia, silver medalist at the 1996 Summer Olympics in the 4×100 m freestyle relay, medalist at the World Championships, European champion.
- Vyacheslav Prudnikov - Master of Sport of Russia, International Class, medalist at the World Championships, multiple winner and medalist at stages of the FINA Swimming World Cup.
- Evgeny Ayzetullov - Master of Sport of Russia, International Class, winner and medalist at the European Junior Championships, medalist at stages of the FINA Swimming World Cup and the World Junior Championships.
- Andrey Kapralov - Honored Master of Sports of Russia, winner and multiple medalist at the World Championships, European Championships, Universiades, and stages of the FINA Swimming World Cup.

== Achievements and awards ==
- Honored Coach of Russia (2004).
- Excellent Worker of Physical Culture and Sports.
- Multiple laureate of the Government of Saint Petersburg Prize.

== Interesting facts ==
- He has been passionate about music since childhood: he has mastered the accordion, guitar, and other instruments.
- In his youth, he was a member of the rock band "Dangerous Zone," where he performed as a vocalist and lead guitarist.
- From 1976–1979, he played in the St. Petersburg jazz-rock band "Fram" as a vocalist, guitarist, and songwriter.
- He still pursues music—he has his own studio where he records his own compositions.
