= Cole Shade Sule =

Cameroonian swimmer (born 1980)

Personal information
- Full name: Cole Shade Sule
- National team: Cameroon
- Born: 5 November 1980 (age 45) Yaounde, Cameroon
- Height: 1.86 m (6 ft 1 in)
- Weight: 85 kg (187 lb)

Sport
- Sport: Swimming
- Strokes: Freestyle
- Club: RACING CLUB DE FRANCE

Cole Shade Sule (born November 5, 1980) is a Cameroonian former swimmer, who specialized in sprint freestyle events. Sule qualified for the men's 50 m freestyle at the 2004 Summer Olympics in Athens, by receiving a Universality place from FINA, in an entry time of 25.96. He challenged seven other swimmers in heat three, including 16-year-old Chris Hackel of Mauritius. He raced to second place by less than 0.17 of a second behind winner Hackel in 26.16. Sule failed to advance into the semifinals, as he placed sixty-fourth out of 86 swimmers in the preliminaries.
