= Bounthanom Vongphachanh =

Laotian swimmer (born 1980)

Personal information
- Full name: Bounthanom Vongphachanh
- National team: Laos
- Born: 9 November 1980 (age 45) Vientiane, Laos
- Height: 1.70 m (5 ft 7 in)
- Weight: 72 kg (159 lb)

Sport
- Sport: Swimming
- Strokes: Freestyle

Bounthanom Vongphachanh (born November 9, 1980, in Vientiane, Laos) is a Laotian former swimmer, who specialized in sprint freestyle events. Vongphachanh qualified for the men's 50 m freestyle at the 2004 Summer Olympics in Athens, by receiving a Universality place from FINA in an entry time of 28.45. He challenged seven other swimmers in heat two, including 15-year-old Malique Williams of Antigua and Barbuda. He posted a lifetime best of 28.17 to earn a third spot by a 1.42-second margin behind winner Anderson Bonabart of Micronesia. Vongphachanh failed to advance into the semifinals, as he placed seventy-seventh overall out of 86 swimmers in the preliminaries.
