= Sergey Dyachkov =

Azerbaijani swimmer (born 1982)

Personal information
- Full name: Sergey Dyachkov
- National team: Azerbaijan
- Born: 28 May 1982 (age 44) Baku, Azerbaijan SSR, Soviet Union
- Height: 1.77 m (5 ft 10 in)
- Weight: 63 kg (139 lb)

Sport
- Sport: Swimming
- Strokes: Freestyle

Sergey Dyachkov (Azerbaijani: Sergey Dyaçkov; born May 28, 1982) is an Azerbaijani former swimmer, who specialized in sprint freestyle events. Dyachkov qualified for the men's 100 m freestyle at the 2004 Summer Olympics in Athens, by receiving a Universality place from FINA, in an entry time of 57.73. He challenged six other swimmers in heat one, including 34-year-old Mumtaz Ahmed of Pakistan. He raced to fifth place in 58.26, more than half a second (0.50) off his entry time. Dyachkov failed to advance into the semifinals, as he placed sixty-seventh overall out of 71 swimmers in the preliminaries.
