= Kreshnik Gjata =

Albanian swimmer (born 1983)

Personal information
- Full name: Kreshnik Gjata
- National team: Albania
- Born: 23 June 1983 (age 43) Pogradec, Albania
- Height: 1.75 m (5 ft 9 in)
- Weight: 75 kg (165 lb)

Sport
- Sport: Swimming
- Strokes: Freestyle

Kreshnik Gjata (born June 23, 1983) is an Albanian former swimmer, who specialized in sprint freestyle events. Gjata qualified for the men's 50 m freestyle at the 2004 Summer Olympics in Athens, by receiving a Universality place from FINA, in an entry time of 26.64. He challenged seven other swimmers in heat three, including 16-year-old Chris Hackel of Mauritius. He posted a lifetime best of 26.61 to earn a fourth spot by a 1.28-second margin behind winner Hackel. Gjata failed to advance into the semifinals, as he shared a sixty-fifth place tie with Kyrgyzstan's Semen Danilov in the prelims.
