= David Keita =

Malian swimmer

Personal information
- Born: April 18, 1980 (age 46)

Sport
- Sport: Swimming

David Keita (born April 18, 1980) is a Malian former swimmer, who specialized in sprint freestyle events. Keita qualified for the men's 50 m freestyle at the 2004 Summer Olympics in Athens, without having an entry time. He challenged five other swimmers in heat one, including 16-year-old Emile Rony Bakale of Congo. He rounded out the field to last place by nearly five seconds behind winner Bakale, overhauling a 30-second barrier and posting a personal best of 29.96. Keita failed to advance into the semifinals, as he placed seventy-ninth overall out of 86 swimmers in the preliminaries.
