= Yevgeni Dyachkov =

Russian footballer

Personal information
- Full name: Yevgeni Nikolayevich Dyachkov
- Date of birth: 9 October 1975 (age 51)
- Place of birth: Yoshkar-Ola, Russian SFSR
- Height: 1.86 m (6 ft 1 in)
- Position: Defender

Senior career*
Years	Team	Apps	(Gls)
1992–1996	FC Druzhba Yoshkar-Ola	90	(4)
1997	FC Volga Ulyanovsk	36	(0)
1998–2001	FC Rubin Kazan	115	(5)
2002	FC KAMAZ Naberezhnye Chelny	5	(0)
2002–2004	FC Luch-Energiya Vladivostok	42	(2)
2004	FC Neftekhimik Nizhnekamsk	14	(2)
2005–2007	FC Spartak-MZhK Ryazan	70	(3)
2007–2008	FC Ryazan	40	(1)
2009–2010	FC SOYUZ-Gazprom Izhevsk	50	(5)
2011–2012	FC Metallurg-Kuzbass Novokuznetsk	10	(1)
2012–2014	FC Zenit-Izhevsk Izhevsk	37	(2)
- * Club domestic league appearances and goals

Yevgeni Nikolayevich Dyachkov (Russian: Евгений Николаевич Дьячков; born 9 October 1975) is a retired Russian professional football player.

== Club career ==
He played 8 seasons in the Russian Football National League for 5 different teams.
