= Brendan Ashby =

Zimbabwean swimmer (born 1980)

Personal information
- Full name: Brendan Ashby
- National team: Zimbabwe
- Born: 30 June 1980 (age 46) Gweru, Zimbabwe
- Height: 2.05 m (6 ft 9 in)
- Weight: 100 kg (220 lb)

Sport
- Sport: Swimming
- Strokes: Backstroke
- College team: University of Alabama (U.S.)
- Coach: Don Gambril (U.S.)

Brendan Ashby (born June 30, 1980) is a Zimbabwean former swimmer, who specialized in backstroke events. Since 2004, Ashby currently holds two Zimbabwean records in the 100 and 200 m backstroke from the World championships and U.S. invitational meets. He is also a former member of the swimming team for the Alabama Crimson Tide at the University of Alabama in Tuscaloosa. Ashby stands 2.05 m (6 ft 9 in) and weighs 100 kg (220 lb).

Ashby qualified for the men's 100 m backstroke at the 2004 Summer Olympics in Athens, by eclipsing a FINA B-standard entry time of 58.28 from the USA Swimming Grand Prix in Indianapolis, Indiana. He challenged seven other swimmers on the second heat, including Olympic veterans Nicholas Neckles of Barbados, George Gleason of the Virgin Islands, and Sung Min of South Korea. Swimming in lane one, Ashby raced to sixth place by a 1.27-second margin behind Gleason in 58.91. Ashby failed to advance into the semifinals, as he placed thirty-ninth overall in the preliminaries.
