= Stanislau Neviarouski =

Belarusian swimmer

Personal information
- Full name: Stanislau Anatolievich Neviarouski
- National team: Belarus
- Born: 7 April 1981 (age 45) Homel, Belarusian SSR, Soviet Union
- Height: 1.90 m (6 ft 3 in)
- Weight: 80 kg (176 lb)

Sport
- Sport: Swimming
- Strokes: Freestyle
- Club: BSKP Homel

Stanislau Anatolievich Neviarouski (Belarusian: Станіслаў Анатольевіч Невяроўскі; born April 7, 1981) is a Belarusian former swimmer, who specialized in sprint and relay freestyle events. He is a two-time Olympian, and a multiple-time Belarusian record holder for the sprint freestyle events (both 50 and 100 m).

Neviarouski made his Olympic debut at the 2004 Summer Olympics in Athens, competing in two swimming events. In the 100 m freestyle, he challenged seven other swimmers on the fifth heat, including Lithuania's Rolandas Gimbutis, a member of the swimming team for the California Golden Bears. He edged out Greece's Aristeidis Grigoriadis to take the third spot by a quarter margin (0.25), with a time of 50.36 seconds. Two days later, Neviarouski placed second behind Hungary's Krisztián Takács, on the sixth heat of the men's 50 m freestyle by one hundredth of a second (0.01), clocking at 23.13 seconds.

Four years after competing in his last Olympics, Neviarouski qualified for his second Belarusian team, as a 27-year-old, at the 2008 Summer Olympics in Beijing. He eclipsed a FINA B-standard entry time of 49.80 (100 m freestyle) from the Serbian Open Championships in Belgrade. Neviarouski challenged seven other swimmers on the fifth heat, including three-time Olympian Örn Arnarson of Iceland. He raced to sixth place and forty-fourth overall by six hundredths of a second (0.06) behind Uruguay's Martín Kutscher in 50.14 seconds. Neviarouski also teamed up with Pavel Sankovich, Yauheni Lazuka, and Viktar Vabishchevich in the 4 × 100 m medley relay. Swimming the freestyle leg, Neviarouski recorded a time of 49.76 seconds, and the Belarusian team finished the heats in sixteenth overall with a final time of 3:39.39.
