= Kyaw Moe Aung =

Former Burmese MP and military officer

His Excellency Lieutenant Colonel Kyaw Moe Aung
- ကျော်မိုးအောင်

Member of the House of Nationalities

Military service
- Allegiance: Myanmar
- Branch/service: Myanmar Army
- Rank: Lieutenant Colonel

Kyaw Moe Aung (Burmese: ကျော်မိုးအောင်; pronounced [t͡ɕɔ̀ mó àʊɰ̃]; born Myanmar) is a Burmese military officer and former member of the Amyotha Hluttaw (House of Nationalities). He has spoken publicly about Myanmar’s constitutional arrangement and the role of the military in the country’s democratic transition.

== Early life and education ==
Kyaw Moe Aung was born in Myanmar, though specific details about his place or date of birth have not been publicly disclosed. He pursued a military education and graduated from the Defence Services Academy (DSA), the premier institution for officer training in Myanmar. His academic background and training at DSA prepared him for a career in the Myanmar Army, where he later rose to the rank of lieutenant colonel.

== Military and political career ==
In September 2019, Kyaw Moe Aung addressed a gathering marking International Day of Democracy in Naypyitaw. Speaking in his capacity as a military-appointed member of parliament, he stated:

“Myanmar’s democracy must be a disciplined one... If it is not a disciplined democracy, and if one stretches the laws as one pleases, [democracy] can be chaotic.”

He emphasized that a stable democratic transition in Myanmar depended on coordination between the Tatmadaw and civilian leaders.

Kyaw Moe Aung praised the 2008 Constitution's provisions granting the military seats in parliament and the authority to declare a national emergency.

== See also ==
- Amyotha Hluttaw
- 2008 Constitution of Myanmar
- Tatmadaw
