= Lee Chung-hee (swimmer) =

South Korean swimmer (born 1981)

Personal information
- Full name: Lee Chung-hee
- National team: South Korea
- Born: 25 April 1981 (age 45) Gangwon Province, South Korea
- Height: 1.90 m (6 ft 3 in)
- Weight: 85 kg (187 lb)

Sport
- Sport: Swimming
- Strokes: Freestyle

- Lee Chung-hee
- Hangul: 이충희
- RR: I Chunghui
- MR: I Ch'unghŭi

Lee Chung-Hee (also Lee Chung-Hui, Korean: 이충희; born April 25, 1981) is a South Korean former swimmer, who specialized in sprint freestyle events. He is a sixth-place finalist in the 50 m freestyle, when his nation South Korea hosted the 2002 Asian Games in Busan.

Lee qualified for two swimming events at the 2004 Summer Olympics in Athens, by eclipsing FINA B-standard entry times of 22.95 (50 m freestyle) and 51.84 (100 m freestyle) from the Dong-A Swimming Tournament in Seoul. In the 100 m freestyle, Lee challenged seven other swimmers on the third heat, including Olympic veteran Carl Probert of Fiji. He shared a second seed and forty-fifth place tie with Panama's Ismael Ortiz in 51.74. In his second event, 50 m freestyle, Lee placed thirty-fifth overall on the morning's preliminaries. Swimming in heat seven, he picked up a fourth spot by 0.15 of a second behind Serbia and Montenegro's Milorad Čavić in 23.05.
