= Mamadou Ouedraogo (swimmer) =

Burkinabé swimmer

Personal information
- Full name: Mamadou Ouedraogo
- National team: Burkina Faso
- Born: 30 May 1967 (age 59)
- Height: 1.76 m (5 ft 9 in)
- Weight: 80 kg (176 lb)

Sport
- Sport: Swimming
- Strokes: Freestyle

Mamadou Ouedraogo (born 30 May 1967) is a Burkinabé former swimmer, who specialized in sprint freestyle events. At the 2004 Summer Olympics in Athens, Ouedraogo was elected by the Burkinabé National Olympic and Sports Committee to carry the nation's flag in the opening ceremony. He qualified for the men's 50 m freestyle, as a 37-year-old, by receiving a Universality place from FINA in an entry time of 29.08. He challenged seven other swimmers in heat two, including 15-year-old Malique Williams of Antigua and Barbuda. Ouedraogo raced to sixth place in 30.36, more than two seconds off his entry time. Ouedraogo failed to advance into the semifinals, as he placed eighty-first overall out of 86 swimmers in the preliminaries.

Olympic Games
Preceded by Sarah Tondé	Flagbearer for Burkina Faso; 2004 Athens	Succeeded by Aïssata Soulama
