= Leonel Matonse =

Mozambican swimmer

Personal information
- Full name: Leonel dos Santos Matonse
- National team: Mozambique
- Born: 14 October 1988 (age 37) Maputo, Mozambique
- Height: 1.77 m (5 ft 10 in)
- Weight: 66 kg (146 lb)

Sport
- Sport: Swimming
- Strokes: Freestyle
- Club: Tuks Aquatics Club (RSA)

Leonel dos Santos Matonse (born October 14, 1988) is a Mozambican swimmer, who specialized in sprint freestyle events. Matonse qualified for the men's 100 m freestyle, as a 15-year-old, at the 2004 Summer Olympics in Athens, by receiving a Universality place from FINA, in an entry time of 59.87. He challenged six other swimmers in heat one, including 34-year-old Mumtaz Ahmed of Pakistan. He set a Mozambican record of 57.79 to earn a third spot by nearly a second behind winner Mohammed Abbas of Iraq. Matonse failed to advance into the semifinals, as he placed sixty-fifth overall out of 71 swimmers in the preliminaries.
