= Jean Laurent Ravera =

Monegasque swimmer (born 1979)

Jean Laurent Ravera OLY
Personal information
- Full name: Jean Laurent Ravera
- National team: Monaco
- Born: 29 August 1979 (age 46)
- Height: 1.84 m (6 ft 0 in)
- Weight: 69 kg (152 lb)

Sport
- Sport: Swimming
- Strokes: Freestyle

Jean Laurent Ravera (born August 29, 1979) is a Monegasque former swimmer, who specialized in sprint freestyle events. Ravera qualified for the men's 100 m freestyle at the 2004 Summer Olympics in Athens, by receiving a Universality place from FINA, in an entry time of 56.86. He challenged seven other swimmers in heat two, including three-time Olympian Aleksandr Agafonov of Uzbekistan. He rounded out the field to last place by five hundredths of a second (0.05) behind Iran's Babak Farhoudi in a lifetime best of 56.47. Ravera failed to advance into the semifinals, as he placed sixty-second overall out of 71 swimmers in the preliminaries.
