= Abed Rahman Kaaki =

Lebanese swimmer (born 1986)

Personal information
- Full name: Abed Rahman Kaaki
- National team: Lebanon
- Born: 30 March 1986 (age 40) Ras Tanura, Saudi Arabia
- Height: 1.82 m (6 ft 0 in)
- Weight: 72 kg (159 lb)

Sport
- Sport: Swimming
- Strokes: Freestyle

Abed Rahman Kaaki (Arabic: عبد الرحمن الكعكي; born March 30, 1986) is a Lebanese former swimmer, who specialized in sprint freestyle events. He represented Lebanon at the 2004 Summer Olympics, and also, held three records for the Connecticut Huskies swimming and diving team at the University of Connecticut, while studying in the United States.

Kaaki qualified for the men's 50 m freestyle at the 2004 Summer Olympics in Athens, by receiving a Universality place from FINA, in an entry time of 25.31. He faced seven other swimmers in heat four, including two-time Olympian Gregory Arkhurst of Côte d'Ivoire. He edged out Arkhurst and Bolivia's Mauricio Prudencio to earn a fifth spot by 0.14 of a second, breaking a Lebanese record of 24.68. Kaaki failed to advance into the semifinals, as he placed 57th out of 86 swimmers in the preliminaries.
