= Donnie Defreitas =

Vincentian swimmer (born 1985)

Personal information
- Full name: Donnie Defreitas
- National team: St. Vincent
- Born: 10 June 1985 (age 41) Havana, Cuba
- Height: 1.65 m (5 ft 5 in)
- Weight: 62 kg (137 lb)

Sport
- Sport: Swimming
- Strokes: Freestyle

Donnie Defreitas (born June 10, 1985) is a former swimmer from Saint Vincent and the Grenadines, who specialized in sprint freestyle events. Defreitas qualified for the men's 50 m freestyle at the 2004 Summer Olympics in Athens, without having an entry time. He challenged five other swimmers in heat one, including 16-year-old Emile Rony Bakale of Congo. He posted a lifetime best of 27.72 to earn a fourth spot by a 2.65-second margin behind winner Bakale. Defreitas failed to advance into the semifinals, as he placed seventy-fourth overall out of 86 swimmers in the preliminaries.
