= Javier Noriega =

Spanish swimmer

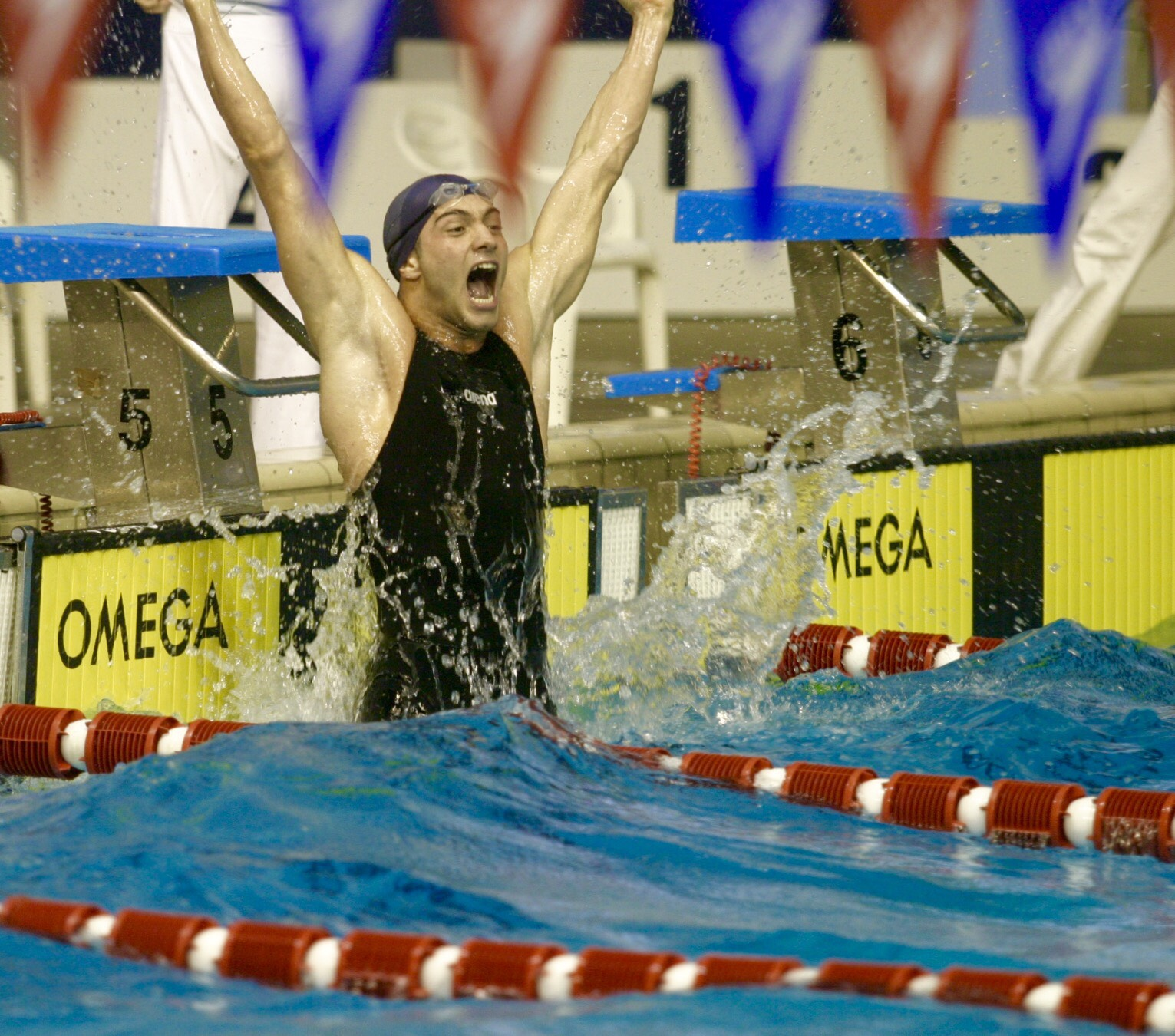

Personal information
- Born: 23 July 1980 (age 45) Toledo, Spain
Medal record
Men's swimming
Representing Spain
Mediterranean Games
Silver medal – second place	2005 Almería	4x100m Freestyle

Javier Noriega Sanz (born 23 July 1980) is a Spanish Olympic-level freestyle and butterfly swimmer. He swam for his native country at the 2004 and 2008 Olympics.

At the 2004 Olympics, he finished in 13th place of the Men's 50 m (164.04 ft) Freestyle, clocking 22.36 seconds in the semi-finals.

== See also ==
- List of Spanish records in swimming
