= Babak Farhoudi =

Iranian swimmer

Personal information
- Full name: Babak Farhoudi
- National team: Iran
- Born: 9 September 1985 (age 40)
- Height: 1.85 m (6 ft 1 in)
- Weight: 70 kg (154 lb)

Sport
- Sport: Swimming
- Strokes: Freestyle

Babak Farhoudi (Persian: بابک فرهودی; born September 9, 1985) is an Iranian former swimmer, who specialized in sprint freestyle events. Farhoudi qualified for the men's 100 m freestyle at the 2004 Summer Olympics in Athens, by receiving a Universality place from FINA, in an entry time of 53.76. He challenged seven other swimmers in heat two, including three-time Olympian Aleksandr Agafonov of Uzbekistan. He edged out Monaco's Jean Laurent Ravera to save a seventh spot by five hundredths of a second (0.05) in 56.42. Farhoudi failed to advance to the semifinals, as he placed sixty-first overall out of 71 swimmers in the preliminaries.
