= Matti Mäki =

Finnish swimmer

Personal information
- Full name: Matti Mäki
- Nationality: Finland
- Born: March 17, 1982 (age 44) Oulu
- Height: 1.94 m (6 ft 4 in)
- Weight: 87 kg (192 lb)

Sport
- Sport: Swimming
- Strokes: Backstroke
- Club: Simmis United

Matti Mäki (born March 17, 1982, in Oulu) is a male backstroke swimmer from Finland. He competed for his native country at the 2004 Summer Olympics in Athens, Greece.
