= Mohammed Abbas (swimmer) =

Iraqi swimmer (born 1978)

Personal information
- Full name: Mohammed Abbas Sabih
- National team: Iraq
- Born: 28 February 1978 (age 48) Baghdad, Iraqi Republic
- Height: 1.70 m (5 ft 7 in)
- Weight: 70 kg (154 lb)

Sport
- Sport: Swimming
- Strokes: Freestyle

Mohammed Abbas Sabih (Arabic: محمد عباس صبيح; born February 28, 1978) is a former Iraqi swimmer, who specialized in sprint freestyle events. He is considered one of Iraq's most promising swimmers, having competed at the Olympics under Saddam Hussein's dictatorship. As part of his preparations, he was trained for the University of British Columbia Dolphins Swim Club in Canada.

Abba qualified for the men's 100 m freestyle at the 2004 Summer Olympics in Athens, by receiving a Universality place from FINA, in an entry time of 58.24. Abbas failed to advance into the semifinals, as he placed sixty-third overall out of 71 swimmers in the preliminaries.

During the Olympics, Abbas also admitted that he shared friendships with Canada's Mike Mintenko, ever since he trained for the UBC Dolphins. He told him stories of how Iraqi athletes trained inside the basement of a sports centre, as a resemblance of a "17-cell prison", and how they were tortured by Uday Hussein for not performing well.
