= Mumtaz Ahmed =

Pakistani swimmer (born 1970)

Personal information
- Full name: Mumtaz Ahmed
- Nationality: Pakistan
- Born: 7 January 1970 (age 56) Karachi, Pakistan
- Height: 1.78 m (5 ft 10 in)
- Weight: 79 kg (174 lb)

Sport
- Sport: Swimming
- Strokes: Freestyle
Medal record
Representing Pakistan
South Asian Games
Silver medal – second place	2004 Islamabad	400m freestyle
Silver medal – second place	2004 Islamabad	1500m freestyle
Silver medal – second place	2004 Islamabad	4x200m freestyle relay

Mumtaz Ahmed (Urdu: ممتاز احمد; born 7 January 1970) is a Pakistani former swimmer, who specialised in sprint freestyle events. Ahmed qualified for the men's 100 m freestyle, as a 34-year-old, at the 2004 Summer Olympics in Athens. He received a Universality place from FINA in an entry time of 57.48. He challenged six other swimmers in heat one, including 15-year-old Leonel Matonse of Mozambique. He overhauled a one-minute barrier, and saved a sixth spot over Burundi's Emery Nziyunvira by more than 10 seconds in 59.19. Ahmed failed to advance into the semifinals, as he placed sixty-eighth overall out of 71 swimmers in the preliminaries.

Ahmed was the silver medallist in both the 400 m freestyle and 1500 m freestyle events at the 2004 South Asian Games in Islamabad.
