= Anderson Bonabart =

Micronesian swimmer

Personal information
- Full name: Anderson Bonabart
- National team: Micronesia
- Born: 4 May 1980 (age 46)
- Height: 1.73 m (5 ft 8 in)
- Weight: 68 kg (150 lb)

Sport
- Sport: Swimming
- Strokes: Freestyle

Anderson Bonabart (born May 4, 1980) is a Micronesian former swimmer, who specialized in sprint freestyle events. Bonabart qualified for the men's 50 m freestyle at the 2004 Summer Olympics in Athens, by receiving a Universality place from FINA in an entry time of 28.07. He set a Micronesian record of 26.75 to lead the second heat against seven other swimmers, including 15-year-old Malique Williams of Antigua and Barbuda. Bonabart failed to advance into the semifinals, as he placed sixty-eighth overall out of 86 swimmers in the prelims.
