= Gilbert Kaburu =

Ugandan swimmer

Personal information
- Full name: Gilbert Kaburu
- National team: Uganda
- Born: 8 November 1981 (age 44) Kampala, Uganda
- Height: 1.70 m (5 ft 7 in)
- Weight: 60 kg (132 lb)

Sport
- Sport: Swimming
- Strokes: Freestyle

Gilbert Kaburu (born November 8, 1981) is a Ugandan former swimmer, Olympian and educator known for his contributions to sport and education both in Uganda and internationally. He specialized in sprint freestyle events. He represented Uganda at the 2008 Summer Olympics, placing among the top 85 swimmers in the 50 m men's freestyle event.

== Education and swimming career ==
Kaburu holds a PhD in education from Ohio University in the United States. He also studied at the College of New Jersey's Graduate Global Programs in Johannesburg, South Africa, while working towards a teaching certification and a master's degree in education. He was invited by FINA to compete as a 26-year-old swimmer for the Ugandan team in the men's 50 m freestyle at the 2008 Summer Olympics in Beijing.

=== International competitions ===
At the 2008 Summer Olympics, Kaburu was invited by the International Swimming Federation (FINA) to compete in the men's 50m freestyle under a universality invitation for athletes from developing swimming nations. He finished with a time of 27.72 seconds, placing 82nd overall out of 97 competitors.

Kaburu competed in the 2008 FINA World Championships (25m) and 2006 Commonwealth Games, taking part in the sprint freestyle and backstroke events while representing Uganda on the international stage.

== Retirement ==
Shortly after the Olympics, Kaburu announced his retirement from his swimming career in order to continue his education at TCNJ's Graduate Global Programs in Johannesburg.

== After retirement ==
After retirement, Kaburu started teaching and coaching. He worked as a swim coach and physical education teacher at the International School of Uganda (ISU). He also expanded his teachings internationally, including at the Khartoum International Community School (KICS) and The American School of Kinshasa (TASOK).

== Personal life ==
Kaburu is married to Kezia Otoa. They have two children, a boy and a girl.
