= Jamie Peterkin =

Saint Lucian swimmer (born 1982)

Personal information
- Born: 28 February 1982 (age 44) Castries, St. Lucia

Sport
- Sport: Swimming
- College team: University of Kentucky

Jamie Peterkin (born 28 February 1982) is a Saint Lucian swimmer. He swam for Saint Lucia in the 2000 Summer Olympics, finishing 59th in the 50-meter freestyle. He is a member of the University of Kentucky swimming team, specializing in the 50- and 100-meter freestyle events.
