= Željko Panić =

Bosnian swimmer

Personal information
- Full name: Željko Panić
- National team: Bosnia and Herzegovina
- Born: 5 May 1976 (age 50) Split, SR Croatia, SFR Yugoslavia
- Height: 2.00 m (6 ft 7 in)
- Weight: 96 kg (212 lb)

Sport
- Sport: Swimming
- Strokes: Freestyle
- Club: PK Borac Incel (BIH)

Željko Panić (born May 5, 1976) is a Bosnian former swimmer, who specialized in sprint freestyle events.

Panić was born in Split, SR Croatia, SFR Yugoslavia, where he first started to train in swimming in 1987. While in Split, he was also coached and trained by Đurđica Bjedov, a two-time breaststroke gold medalist. In 1991, he moved to Banja Luka in SR Bosnia, where he became a resident swimmer for PK Borac Incel.

Panic made his official debut at the 2000 Summer Olympics in Sydney, where he competed in the men's 100 m freestyle. He touched out Venezuela's Francisco Sánchez to take the seventh spot and forty-ninth overall in the sixth heat by 0.03 of a second in 52.40.

At the 2004 Summer Olympics in Athens, Panic qualified again for the men's 100 m freestyle by eclipsing a FINA B-standard entry time of 52.12 from the Croatian Open Championships in Zagreb. He challenged seven other swimmers on the second heat, including fellow Olympic veterans Alexandr Agafanov of Uzbekistan and Camilo Becerra of Colombia. Panic raced to third place by 0.18 of a second behind Becerra, outside his entry time of 52.75. Panic failed to advance into the semifinals, as he placed fifty-fifth overall in the preliminaries.

Shortly after the Olympics, Panic retired from his sport to work as an assistant coach and later as a sports director for the Olympic Swimming Club (Serbian: Plivački klub Olimp) in Banja Luka.
