= Julien Sicot =

French swimmer

Personal information
- Full name: Julien Sicot
- Nationality: France
- Born: 20 March 1978 (age 48) Fort-de-France, Martinique
- Height: 1.92 m (6 ft 4 in)

Sport
- Sport: Swimming
- Strokes: Freestyle
- Club: CS Clichy 92, Rouen
Medal record
World Championships (LC)
Bronze medal – third place	2003 Barcelona	4×100 m freestyle
Bronze medal – third place	2007 Melbourne	4×100 m freestyle
European Championships (LC)
Silver medal – second place	2004 Madrid	4×100 m medley
Bronze medal – third place	1997 Seville	50 m freestyle
Bronze medal – third place	2004 Madrid	4×100 m freestyle
European Championships (SC)
Bronze medal – third place	2006 Helsinki	50 m freestyle
Mediterranean Games
Gold medal – first place	1997 Bari	50 m freestyle

Julien Sicot (French: [ʒyljɛ̃ siko]; born 20 March 1978 in Fort-de-France, Martinique) is a French Olympic freestyle swimmer. He swam for France at the 2004 Summer Olympics, and has been a member of the French national team since 1997.

He also swam for France at the 2003 and 2007 World Championships.
