= Octavian Guțu =

Moldovan swimmer

Octavian Guţu
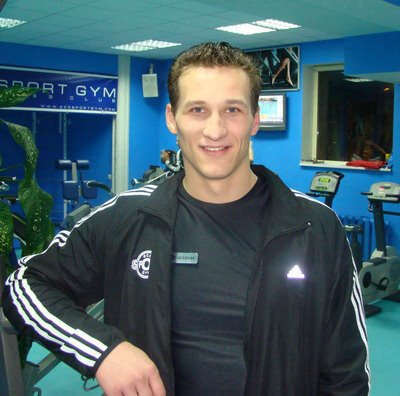
- Guțu in 2010

Personal information
- Nickname: Otto
- Nationality: Moldovan
- Born: 17 June 1982 (age 44) Kishinev, Moldavian SSR, USSR
- Height: 2.00 m (6 ft 6 1/2 in)
- Weight: 110 kg (243 lb)

Sport
- Sport: Swimming
Medal record
Gold 2006 Tours	Gold Univeriade

Octavian Guţu (born 17 June 1982) is an Olympic swimmer from Moldova who swam for his native country at the 2004 Olympics. He then joined the French team and represented Racing Club de France RCF in national (interclubs) swimming meets. In the 2006 Tours, he became an unofficial French champion in the 4x100 Freestyle relay. The same year, he won a gold medal for his Panthéon-Assas University. He has also swum internationally for Romania at the 2007 World Championship Melbourne in the 4x100 Medley Relay and classified for 8th place in the world. In 2007, he joined the Cannet66 swim club, where he trained with Philippe Lucas, a famous French coach, and his young protégé Laure Manaudou (age 17 at the time) who won three Olympic medals including gold in the 400m freestyle (first ever for a French woman), silver in the 800m free, and bronze in the 100m back.

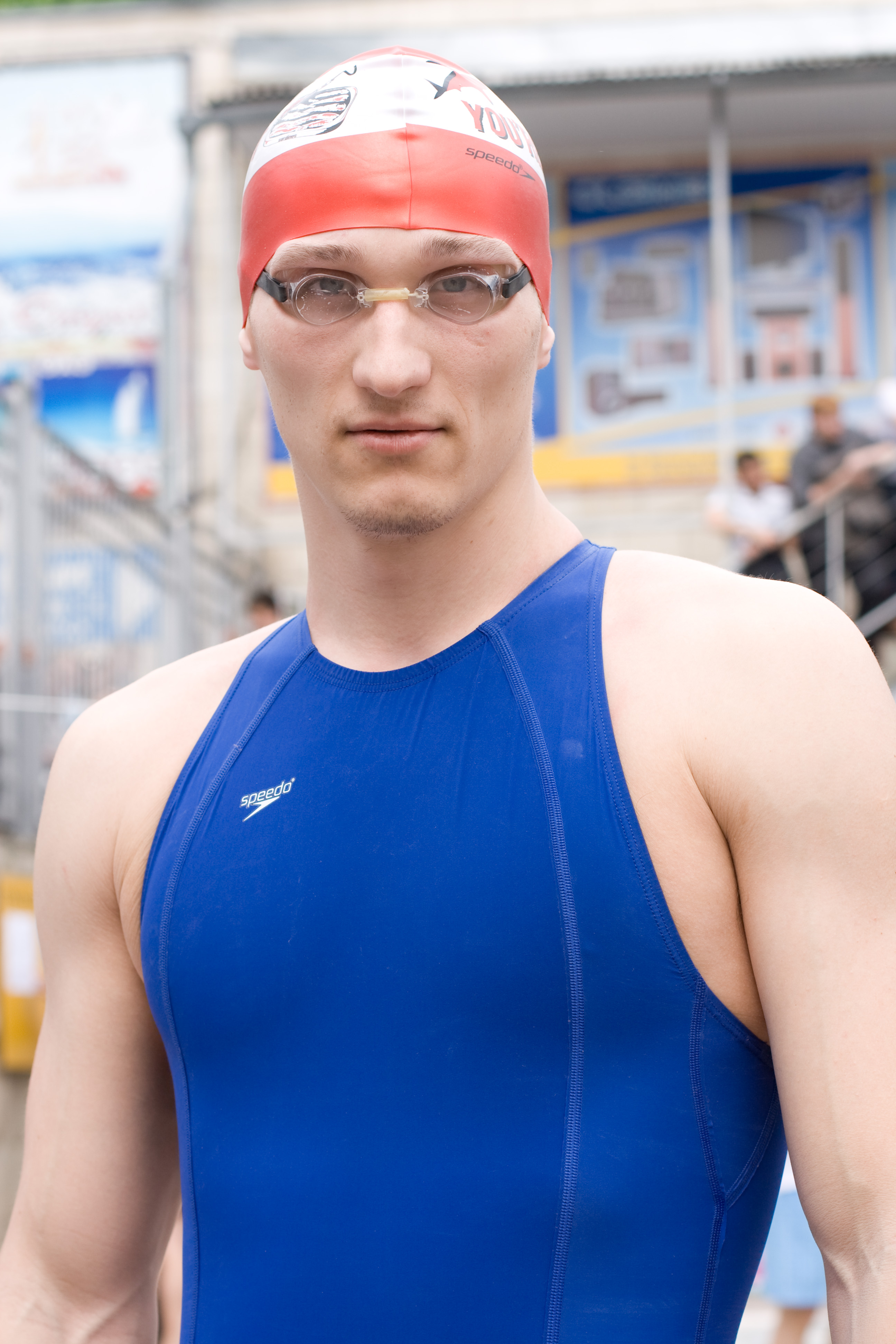
Otto 2007 Universiade MDA

He represented Moldova at the 2008 Summer Olympics, having swum for Romania at the 2007 World Championships.

Octavian is now working as a swimming coach at Cote-St-Luc Aquatics in Montreal, Quebec.
