= Michele Scarica =

Italian swimmer (born 1982)

Personal information
- Born: March 17, 1982 (age 44) Parma, Italy

Sport
- Sport: Swimming
Medal record
Representing Italy
Mediterranean Games
| Gold medal – first place | 2001 Tunis | 4x100m freestyle relay |

Michele Scarica (born 17 March 1982) is an Italian former swimmer who competed in the 2004 Summer Olympics.
