= Aleksandr Agafonov =

Uzbek swimmer (born 1975)

Personal information
- Full name: Aleksandr Agafonov
- National team: Uzbekistan
- Born: 22 April 1975 (age 51) Tashkent, Uzbek SSR, Soviet Union
- Height: 1.90 m (6 ft 3 in)
- Weight: 86 kg (190 lb)

Sport
- Sport: Swimming
- Strokes: Freestyle
Medal record
Representing Uzbekistan
Asian Games
Bronze medal – third place	1994 Beijing	4x100m freestyle relay

Aleksandr Agafonov (Uzbek: Александр Агафонов; born 22 April 1975) is an Uzbek former swimmer, who specialized in freestyle events. He is a three-time Olympian (1996, 2000, and 2004), a two-time swimmer at the Asian Games (2002 and 2006), and a former Uzbekistani age group record holder in the 100 and 200 m freestyle.

Agafonov made his official debut at the 1996 Summer Olympics in Atlanta, where he competed as a member of the Uzbekistan team in the 4 × 200 m freestyle relay. Teaming with Vyacheslav Kabanov, Dmitry Pankov, and Oleg Tsvetkovskiy, Agafonov swam the second leg in heat two with a split of 1:56.44, but the Uzbeks settled for fourth place and twelfth overall in a final time of 7:40.60.

At the 2000 Summer Olympics in Sydney, Agafonov competed as an individual swimmer in the 100 m freestyle. Swimming in heat three, he picked up a third seed and fifty-fourth overall by 0.36 of a second behind winner Paul Kutscher of Uruguay in 52.58.

Agafonov swam for his second time in the 100 m freestyle at the 2004 Summer Olympics in Athens. He achieved a FINA B-standard of 52.10 from the Russian Championships in Moscow. He challenged seven other swimmers in heat two, including 28-year-old Željko Panić of Bosnia and Herzegovina. He raced to fourth place by 0.17 of a second behind Panic in 52.92. Agafonov ended his third Olympic stint with a fifty-seventh-place effort in the preliminaries.
