= Bartosz Kizierowski =

Polish swimmer (born 1977)

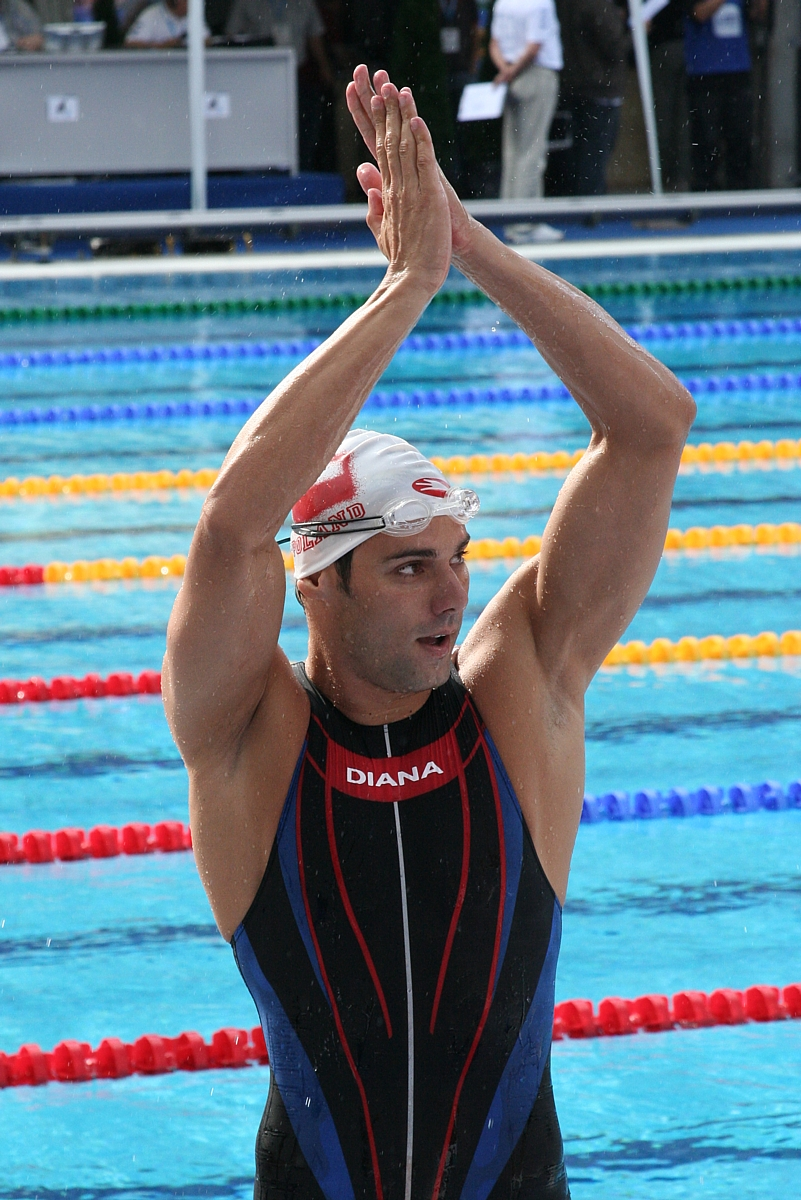
- Kizierowski after winning gold at 2006 European Championships

Personal information
- Full name: Bartłomiej Kizierowski
- Nickname: "Bartosz"
- Born: 20 February 1977 (age 49) Warsaw, Mazowieckie, Poland
- Height: 1.88 m (6 ft 2 in)

Sport
- Country: Poland
- Sport: Swimming
- Strokes: Freestyle, backstroke
- Club: Polonia Warszawa
- College team: University of California, Berkeley
Medal record
Men's swimming
Representing Poland
World Championships
Bronze medal – third place	2005 Montreal	50 m freestyle
World Championships (SC)
Bronze medal – third place	1999 Hong Kong	100 m freestyle
Goodwill Games
Gold medal – first place	2001 Brisbane	50 m Backstroke
Gold medal – first place	2001 Brisbane	50 m Freestyle
European Championships (LC)
Gold medal – first place	2002 Berlin	50 m freestyle
Gold medal – first place	2006 Budapest	50 m freestyle
Bronze medal – third place	1997 Seville	4×100 m medley
Bronze medal – third place	2002 Berlin	50 m backstroke
European Championships (SC)
Bronze medal – third place	2003 Dublin	50 m freestlye
Universiade
Gold medal – first place	2001 Beijing	50 m freestyle
Silver medal – second place	2001 Beijing	100 m freestyle

Bartłomiej "Bartosz" Kizierowski (born 20 February 1977) is a freestyle who represented Poland in four consecutive Summer Olympics, starting in 1996.

== Biography ==
Kizierowski began his career as a backstroke swimmer, but changed to freestyle in the mid-1990s.

Kizierowski trained at The Race Club, a swimming techniques training club founded by Olympic Swimmers Gary Hall, Jr. and his father, Gary Hall, Sr. The Race Club, originally known as "The World Team," was designed to serve as a training group for elite swimmers across the world in preparation for the 2000 Sydney Olympic Games. To be able to train with the Race Club, one must either have been ranked in the top 20 in the world the past 3 calendar years or top 3 in their nation in the past year. The Race Club included such well known swimmers as Roland Mark Schoeman, Mark Foster, Ryk Neethling, and Therese Alshammar.

He won his first medal in 2002 at the European Championships in Berlin, in the 50 m freestyle (gold medal). He won a gold at the 2006 European Championships in Budapest.

He lives and studies in the United States, at the University of California, Berkeley.

He is a 1996 Graduate of Mission Viejo High School, where he swam for Coach Mike Pelton.

== See also ==
- The Race Club

Olympic Games
Preceded by Andrzej Wroński	Flagbearer for Poland; 2004 Athens	Succeeded by Marek Twardowski
