= Duje Draganja =

Croatian swimmer (born 1983)

Personal information
- Full name: Duje Draganja
- Nationality: Croatia
- Born: 27 February 1983 (age 43) Split, SR Croatia, SFR Yugoslavia
- Height: 1.96 m (6 ft 5 in)
- Weight: 81 kg (179 lb)

Sport
- Sport: Swimming
- Strokes: butterfly, freestyle
- Club: POŠK Split (1994–2003); PK Primorje Rijeka (2003–2007); PK Dubrava (2007–)
- College team: University of California Golden Bears (2001–2004)
Medal record
Men's swimming
Representing Croatia
Olympic Games
Silver medal – second place	2004 Athens	50 m freestyle
World Championships
Silver medal – second place	2005 Montreal	50 m freestyle
World SC Championships
Gold medal – first place	2008 Manchester	50 m freestyle
Gold medal – first place	2006 Shanghai	50 m freestyle
Bronze medal – third place	2008 Manchester	100 m freestyle
Bronze medal – third place	2004 Indianapolis	50 m butterfly
European Championships LC
Silver medal – second place	2008 Eindhoven	50 m freestyle
Silver medal – second place	2008 Eindhoven	4×100 m medley
Silver medal – second place	2006 Budapest	50 m butterfly
Bronze medal – third place	2006 Budapest	50 m freestyle
Bronze medal – third place	2002 Berlin	100 m freestyle
European Championships SC
Gold medal – first place	2009 Istanbul	100 m medley
Silver medal – second place	2009 Istanbul	50 m freestyle
Silver medal – second place	2009 Istanbul	4×50 m freestyle
Silver medal – second place	2007 Debrecen	50 m freestyle
Bronze medal – third place	2008 Rijeka	50 m freestyle
Bronze medal – third place	2001 Antwerp	100 m freestyle
Bronze medal – third place	2000 Valencia	4×50 m medley

Duje Draganja (Croatian pronunciation: [dǔːje drǎɡaɲa]; born 27 February 1983) is a retired Croatian swimmer who won the silver medal in men's 50 metres freestyle race at the 2004 Summer Olympics in Athens, Greece.

== Career ==
Draganja won a silver medal in 2005 World Aquatics Championships held in Montreal in 50 m freestyle. He has 4 medals from World Short Course Swimming Championships. In 2006 and 2008 he won a gold medal in 50 meter freestyle. Also he has bronze medal in 100 m freestyle (2008) and bronze medal in 50 m butterfly (2006).

Draganja is also a former NCAA record holder in the 100 yard freestyle, with a time of 41.49, set in 2005, while he swam for the University of California, Berkeley. He, like many other world-class, non-American swimmers, chose to spend 4 years training and competing at an American university. During his four years with Cal under Hall of Fame Head Coach Nort Thornton, Duje won 10 Pac-10 swimming titles, and eight NCAA National championships. While at Cal, he also trained with the world-renowned sprinting coach Mike Bottom. Bottom coached Draganja for seven years before they parted ways following the 2008 Olympics.

Draganja trained at The Race Club, a swimming club founded by Olympic Swimmers Gary Hall, Jr. and his father, Gary Hall, Sr. The Race Club, originally known as "The World Team," was designed to serve as a training group for elite swimmers across the world in preparation for the 2000 Sydney Olympic Games. To be able to train with the Race Club, one must either have been ranked in the top 20 in the world the past 3 calendar years or top 3 in their nation in the past year. The Race Club included such well known swimmers as Roland Mark Schoeman, Mark Foster, Ryk Neethling, Ricardo Busquets and Therese Alshammar. They were coached by University of Michigan coach Mike Bottom.

He has been controversial in Croatia for his decision to take the citizenship of Qatar and continue his swimming career under the flag of that country, after receiving a very lucrative offer to do so. Croatian public opinion largely turned against Draganja at that time with the press portraying him as a villain with no respect for his homeland. Draganja accepted a Qatar passport in August 2005, claiming that he will keep his Croatian passport and will not change his religion. Draganja was raised Roman Catholic.

However, in February 2006, the swimmer made it clear that he had reversed his decision and that he will continue to compete for his country of birth, Croatia.

== Personal bests ==
=== Long course ===
- 50 meters freestyle – 21.29 NR (Rome, 31 July 2009)
- 100 meters freestyle – 48.18 NR (Rome, 29 July 2009)
- 50 meters butterfly – 23.03 NR (Rome, 26 July 2009)
- 100 meters butterfly – 52.46 (Athens, 20 August 2004)

=== Short course ===
- 50 meters freestyle – 20.70 NR (Istanbul, 10 December 2009)
- 100 meters freestyle – 46.64 NR (March 2004)
- 100 meters butterfly – 51.19 (Debrecen, 13 December 2007)
- 100 metres medley – 51.20 NR (Istanbul, 13 December 2009)

== Olympic results ==
Olympic results
Event	2000 Sydney	2004 Athens	2008 Beijing
50 metre freestyle	—	2nd 21.94	10th 21.85
100 metre butterfly	—	7th 52.46	—
100 metre freestyle	11th 49.67	6th 49.23	34th 49.49
4 × 100 metre freestyle relay	19th 3:24.96	13th 3:21.01	—
4 × 100 metre medley relay	14th 3:42.73	—	12th 3:37.69

== See also ==
- World record progression 50 metres freestyle

Records
Preceded by Stefan Nystrand	Men's 50 metres freestyle world record holder (short course); 11 April 2008 – 7 September 2008	Succeeded by Roland Schoeman
