= Andrey Kapralov =

Russian swimmer

Personal information
- Full name: Андрей Николаевич Капралов
- Nationality: Russia
- Born: 7 October 1980 (age 45) Leningrad, Soviet Union
- Height: 1.90 m (6 ft 3 in)
- Weight: 76 kg (168 lb)

Sport
- Sport: Swimming
- Strokes: Freestyle
- Club: SK Izhorets, Sankt Peterburg
Medal record
Men's swimming
Representing Russia
World Championships (LC)
Gold medal – first place	2003 Barcelona	4×100 m freestyle
Silver medal – second place	2005 Montreal	4×100 m medley
Bronze medal – third place	2007 Melbourne	4×100 m medley
World Championships (SC)
Silver medal – second place	2002 Moscow	4×200 m freestyle
Bronze medal – third place	2000 Athens	4×200 m freestyle
Bronze medal – third place	2002 Moscow	4×100 m freestyle
European Championships (LC)
Gold medal – first place	2000 Helsinki	4×100 m freestyle
Gold medal – first place	2006 Budapest	4×100 m medley
Silver medal – second place	2004 Madrid	200 m freestyle
Silver medal – second place	2004 Madrid	4×100 m freestyle
Silver medal – second place	2004 Madrid	4×200 m freestyle
Silver medal – second place	2006 Budapest	4×100 m freestyle
Bronze medal – third place	1999 Istanbul	4x200 m freestyle
Summer Universiade
Gold medal – first place	2003 Daegu	100 m freestyle
Gold medal – first place	2003 Daegu	4×200 m freestyle
Silver medal – second place	2003 Daegu	4×100 m medley

Andrey Nikolayevich Kapralov (Russian: Андрей Николаевич Капралов) (born 7 October 1980) is a freestyle swimmer from Russia, who won the silver medal in the men's 200 metres freestyle event at the 2004 European Championships. He represented his native country at two consecutive Summer Olympics, starting in 2000 in Sydney, Australia. Coach - Valery Gabisoniya.
