= Karel Novy (swimmer) =

Swiss swimmer (born 1980)

Personal information
- Born: 12 June 1980 (age 46) Domažlice, Czechoslovakia
- Height: 1.97 m (6 ft 6 in)
- Weight: 82 kg (181 lb)

Sport
- Sport: Swimming
- Club: Vevey Natation, SC Uster Wallisellen
Medal record
Representing Switzerland
European Championships (SC)
Bronze medal – third place	1999 Lisbon	100 m freestyle
Bronze medal – third place	2000 Valencia	100 m freestyle
Bronze medal – third place	2003 Dublin	4×50 m medley

Karel Novy (born 12 June 1980 as Karel Nový) is a Swiss freestyle swimmer who won three bronze medals at short-course (25 m pool) European Championships. He also competed in five freestyle events at the Summer Olympics of 2000, 2004 and 2008, but never reached the finals.
