= Chris Hackel =

Mauritian swimmer

Personal information
- Born: Chris Jean Tamas Jacques Hackel; December 15, 1987 (age 38)

Sport
- Sport: Swimming

Chris Jean Tamas Jacques Hackel (born 15 December 1987) is a Mauritian swimmer. Hackel represented Mauritius at the 2004 Summer Olympics and 2006 Commonwealth Games.

== 2004 Summer Olympics ==
Hackel competed in the Men's 50 metre freestyle and won his individual heat, but finished 62nd overall out of 86 competitors.

== 2006 Commonwealth Games ==
Hackel competed in 3 different events at the 2006 Commonwealth Games, 100 metres freestyle, 200 metres freestyle, and 400 metres freestyle.
