= Malique Williams =

Antigua and Barbuda swimmer (born 1988)

Personal information
- Full name: Malique Williams
- National team: Antigua and Barbuda
- Born: 13 August 1988 (age 37)
- Height: 1.55 m (5 ft 1 in)
- Weight: 49 kg (108 lb)

Sport
- Sport: Swimming
- Strokes: Freestyle

Malique Williams (born August 13, 1988) is an Antiguan swimmer, who specialized in sprint freestyle events. Williams qualified for the men's 50 m freestyle, as a 15-year-old, at the 2004 Summer Olympics in Athens. He received a Universality place from FINA in an entry time of 34.04. He challenged seven other swimmers in heat two, including 37-year-old Mamadou Ouedraogo of Burkina Faso. He posted a lifetime best of 32.86 to secure seventh spot over Malawi's Yona Walesi by a 1.15-second margin. Williams failed to advance into the semifinals, as he placed eighty-second overall out of 86 swimmers in the preliminaries.
