= Swimming at the 2009 World Aquatics Championships – Men's 100 metre freestyle =

Men's 100 metre freestyle at the 2009 FINA World Championships
- Venue: Foro Italico
- Dates: 29 July 2009 (heats, semifinals); 30 July 2009 (final)
- Competitors: 211
- Winning time: 46.91 WR

Medalists
gold medal	César Cielo Filho	Brazil
silver medal	Alain Bernard	France
bronze medal	Frédérick Bousquet	France

The men's 100 m freestyle at the 2009 World Championships took place on 29 July (heats and semifinals) and the evening of 30 July (finals) at the Foro Italico in Rome, Italy.

== Records ==
Prior to this competition, the existing world and competition records were as follows:

World record	Eamon Sullivan (AUS)	47.05	Beijing, China	13 August 2008
Championship record	Filippo Magnini (ITA)	48.12	Montreal, Canada	28 July 2005

The following records were established during the competition:

Date	Round	Name	Nationality	Time	Record
26 July	Heat 3*	Brent Hayden	Canada	47.77	CR
26 July	Heat 4*	Stefan Nystrand	Sweden	47.52	CR
26 July	Heat 5*	César Cielo Filho	Brazil	47.39	CR
26 July	Final*	César Cielo Filho	Brazil	47.09	CR
30 July	Final	César Cielo Filho	Brazil	46.91	WR

* Split from the men's 4 × 100 m freestyle relay

== Results ==
=== Preliminary heats ===
Rank	Name	Nationality	Time	Heat	Lane	Notes
1	David Walters	USA	47.59	21	6	
2	Stefan Nystrand	Sweden	47.66	21	5	
3	Lyndon Ferns	South Africa	47.79	21	3	AF
4	Alain Bernard	France	47.80	22	4	
5	Brent Hayden	Canada	47.83	22	6	
6	Frédérick Bousquet	France	47.89	21	4	
7	Evgeniy Lagunov	Russia	47.92	20	2	
8	César Cielo	Brazil	47.98	22	5	
9	Andrey Grechin	Russia	48.13	20	4	
9	Nathan Adrian	USA	48.13	22	3	
11	Duje Draganja	Croatia	48.18	18	5	
12	Nicolas Oliveira	Brazil	48.22	21	1	
13	Filippo Magnini	Italy	48.23	20	3	
14	Matt Targett	Australia	48.26	20	5	
15	Konrad Czerniak	Poland	48.32	21	7	
16	Joel Greenshields	Canada	48.43	21	2	
17	Matthew Abood	Australia	48.45	19	4	
18	Shaune Fraser	Cayman Islands	48.47	18	3	
19	Brett Fraser	Cayman Islands	48.56	10	6	
20	Simon Burnett	Great Britain	48.57	20	6	
21	Christian Galenda	Italy	48.62	22	7	
22	Steffen Deibler	Germany	48.68	19	5	
23	Roland Schoeman	South Africa	48.69	22	1	
24	Norbert Trandafir	Romania	48.75	20	0	NR
25	Nabil Kebbab	Algeria	48.76	22	2	
26	George Bovell	Trinidad and Tobago	48.82	20	8	NR
27	Paulius Viktoravičius	Lithuania	48.84	19	7	NR
28	Adam Brown	Great Britain	48.90	22	0	
29	Nimrod Shapira Bar-Or	Israel	48.93	19	3	NR
30	Alexei Puninski	Croatia	49.08	18	6	
31	Sebastiaan Verschuren	Netherlands	49.12	21	0	
32	Jason Dunford	Kenya	49.16	22	8	
33	Dominik Meichtry	Switzerland	49.17	20	7	
33	Albert Subirats	Venezuela	49.17	21	9	
35	Flori Lang	Switzerland	49.20	20	9	
36	Mindaugas Sadauskas	Lithuania	49.26	16	5	
37	Rammaru Harada	Japan	49.28	19	1	
38	David Dunford	Kenya	49.34	14	3	
39	Jacinto Ayala	Dominican Republic	49.38	11	7	NR
40	Martin Verner	Czech Republic	49.39	22	9	
41	Jakob Andkjær	Denmark	49.43	18	4	
41	Chen Zuo	China	49.43	20	1	
43	Petter Stymne	Sweden	49.47	19	2	
44	Ryan Harrison	Ireland	49.49	17	8	NR
45	Alexandre Agostinho	Portugal	49.50	18	2	
46	Romāns Miloslavskis	Latvia	49.51	17	9	
46	Yoshihiro Okumura	Japan	49.51	19	0	
48	Douglas Clark Lennox II	Puerto Rico	49.62	10	3	
48	Cai Li	China	49.62	19	6	
50	Yoris Grandjean	Belgium	49.75	21	8	
51	Barry Murphy	Ireland	49.76	16	3	
52	Andrei Radzionau	Belarus	49.90	18	0	
53	Ioannis Kalargaris	Greece	49.92	18	1	
54	Ryan John Pini	Papua New Guinea	49.94	18	7	
55	Marcin Tarczyński	Poland	49.97	19	8	
56	Paulo Santos	Portugal	50.01	16	7	
56	Roberto Gómez	Venezuela	50.01	17	3	
58	Andrii Hovorov	Ukraine	50.04	17	6	
59	Virdhawal Khade	India	50.07	19	9	
60	Martín Kutscher	Uruguay	50.19	18	9	
61	Dmytro Cherkasov	Ukraine	50.22	1	3	
62	Alexandre Bakhtiarov	Cyprus	50.30	15	2	
63	Emil Dall-Nielsen	Denmark	50.32	17	1	
64	Glenn Surgeloose	Belgium	50.37	17	7	
65	Mario Montoya	Costa Rica	50.40	13	2	NR
66	Jose Antonio Alonso	Spain	50.41	18	8	
67	Martin Spitzer	Austria	50.43	15	8	
68	Andrejs Dūda	Latvia	50.45	14	6	
69	Dominik Koll	Austria	50.48	17	5	
70	Vlad Razvan Caciuc	Romania	50.51	15	4	
71	Daniil Tulupov	Uzbekistan	50.60	14	5	
72	Kaan Tayla	Turkey	50.62	17	2	
73	Raúl Martínez Colomer	Puerto Rico	50.65	15	3	
74	Alex Villaecija	Spain	50.66	16	6	
75	Vladimir Sidorkin	Estonia	50.71	17	4	
76	Zoltan Povazsay	Hungary	50.73	17	0	
77	Julio Galofre	Colombia	50.80	16	1	
78	Daniel Bego	Malaysia	50.86	13	6	
78	Doğa Çelik	Turkey	50.86	16	0	
80	Elvis Burrows	Bahamas	50.88	12	2	NR
81	Artur Dilman	Kazakhstan	50.88	16	2	
82	Terrence Haynes	Barbados	50.95	16	4	
83	Juan Cambindo Romanos	Colombia	50.96	14	4	
83	Raphaël Stacchiotti	Luxembourg	50.96	16	8	
85	Aleksandar Nikolov	Bulgaria	50.98	12	7	
86	Martyn Forde	Barbados	51.01	15	9	
87	Hajder Ensar	Bosnia and Herzegovina	51.08	14	7	
88	Branden Whitehurst	(United States Virgin Islands) Virgin Islands	51.27	11	3	NR
89	Mohammad Bidarian	Iran	51.31	11	5	
90	Bae Joonmo	South Korea	51.54	12	3	
90	Sebastián Jahnsen Madico	Peru	51.54	14	1	
92	Pasha Vahdati Rad	Iran	51.65	8	4	
93	Roy-Allan Burch	Bermuda	51.68	12	8	NR
93	Danil Haustov	Estonia	51.68	16	9	
95	Foo Jian Beng	Malaysia	51.71	15	5	
96	Vasilii Danilov	Kyrgyzstan	51.81	15	6	
97	Tan Xue Wei Nicholas	Singapore	51.83	13	8	
98	Sebastian Arispe Silva	Peru	51.85	14	8	
99	Jean-François Schneiders	Luxembourg	51.86	13	5	
99	Květoslav Svoboda	Czech Republic	51.86	15	0	
101	Jani Rusi	Finland	51.88	14	9	
102	Charles William Walker	Philippines	51.92	13	0	
103	Lim Clement	Singapore	52.11	12	4	
104	Mikael Koloyan	Armenia	52.12	13	4	
105	Cheah Geoffrey Robin	Hong Kong	52.14	13	1	
106	Miguel Nesrala	Dominican Republic	52.21	12	0	
107	Grant Beahan	Zimbabwe	52.23	14	2	
108	Petr Romashkin	Uzbekistan	52.26	13	3	
109	José Alberto Montoya	Costa Rica	52.31	11	8	
110	Brad Hamilton	Jamaica	52.37	9	0	
111	Mohammad Madwa	Kuwait	52.40	15	1	
112	Christopher Duenas	Guam	52.45	12	5	
113	Nicholas Thomson	Bermuda	52.47	9	4	
114	Norbert Trudman	Slovakia	52.51	14	0	
115	Sidni Hoxha	Albania	52.54	11	1	
115	Glenn Victor Sutanto	Indonesia	52.54	13	9	
117	Kang Yonghwan	South Korea	52.62	10	1	
118	Kouam Amine	Morocco	52.64	11	4	
119	Kendrick Uy	Philippines	52.67	12	6	
120	Luke Hall	Eswatini	52.79	11	0	
121	Salvador Mallat Arcaya	Chile	52.86	9	6	
122	Zane Jordan	Zambia	52.92	10	4	
123	Abdoul Khadre Mbaye Niane	Senegal	52.96	10	7	
124	Yan Ho Chun	Hong Kong	52.97	11	2	
125	Joao Matias	Angola	52.99	9	1	
126	Rodion Davelaar	Netherlands Antilles	53.00	12	9	
127	Serghei Golban	Moldova	53.04	11	9	
128	Endi Babi	Albania	53.07	10	9	
129	Fernando Castellanos	Guatemala	53.19	8	0	
130	Iuri Iazadji	Moldova	53.26	12	1	
131	Bojan Jovanov	Macedonia	53.27	1	6	
132	Sergej Naumovski	Macedonia	53.30	1	1	
133	Jonathan Wong	Jamaica	53.35	9	5	
134	Ashwin Menon	India	53.41	9	8	
135	Hycinth Cijntje	Netherlands Antilles	53.46	8	5	
136	Alexander Ray	Namibia	53.61	7	6	
137	Matar Samb	Senegal	53.71	10	2	
138	Humoud Alhumoud	Kuwait	53.72	13	7	
139	Achelhi Bilal	Morocco	53.86	9	2	
140	Rony Bakale	Congo	53.92	8	2	
141	Kareem Ennab	Jordan	53.97	9	9	
142	Lao Kuan Fong	Macau	54.11	9	3	
143	Allan Gutiérrez Castro	Honduras	54.16	8	6	
144	Yellow Yeiyah	Nigeria	54.17	7	1	
145	Samson Opuakpo	Nigeria	54.28	6	6	
146	Abbas Raad	Lebanon	54.32	11	6	
147	Harutyun Harutyunyan	Armenia	54.39	8	3	
148	Saeed Al Jesmi	United Arab Emirates	54.76	7	4	
149	Timothy Ferris	Zimbabwe	54.78	10	8	
150	Mohammed Al Ghaferi	United Arab Emirates	54.83	8	8	
151	Vincent Perry	Tahiti	54.88	7	8	
152	Colin Bensadon	Gibraltar	54.94	6	3	
153	Jean Hugues Gregoire	Mauritius	54.96	7	5	
154	Julien Brice	Saint Lucia	55.00	5	1	
155	Niall Christopher Roberts	Guyana	55.08	6	4	
156	Andrey Molchanov	Turkmenistan	55.30	6	7	
157	Gary Pineda	Guatemala	55.34	6	1	
158	Tsung Chao-Lin	Chinese Taipei	55.40	9	7	
159	Rashid Iunusov	Kyrgyzstan	55.45	10	0	
160	Esau Simpson	Grenada	55.59	6	8	
161	Moh'D Aqelah	Jordan	55.74	8	7	
162	Edward Caruana Dingli	Malta	55.75	6	5	
163	Ignacio Quevedo Bubba	Bolivia	55.95	5	3	
164	Nicholas Coard	Grenada	55.99	5	6	
165	Ronny Vencatachellum	Mauritius	56.00	7	0	
166	Ahmed Jebrel	Palestine	56.05	8	1	
167	Shane Mangroo	Seychelles	56.15	4	2	
167	Anthony Clark	Tahiti	56.15	8	9	
169	Patricio Vera	Mozambique	56.29	5	2	
170	Sergeý Krowýakow	Turkmenistan	56.59	5	5	
171	Peter Popahun Pokawin	Papua New Guinea	56.97	4	5	
172	Chong Cheok Kuan	Macau	57.35	6	2	
173	Douglas Miller	Fiji	57.43	5	8	
174	Juan Carlos Sikaffy Diaz	Honduras	57.52	6	0	
175	Elaijie Erasito	Fiji	57.64	5	9	
176	Siu Kent Chung	Brunei	57.96	5	0	
177	Omar Jasam	Bahrain	58.38	6	9	
178	Jesse Nilon	Samoa	58.56	4	4	
179	Quenton Dupont	Eswatini	58.69	4	3	
180	Ahmed Salam Ali Al-Dulaimi	Iraq	58.91	2	5	
181	Adama Ouedraogo	Burkina Faso	59.11	1	8	
182	Michael Taylor	Marshall Islands	59.24	4	1	
183	Jake Villarreal	Marshall Islands	59.39	4	8	
184	Mark Paul Thompson	Zambia	59.84	3	3	
185	Edward Poppe	Guam	1:00.05	4	6	
186	Adam Viktora	Seychelles	1:00.17	3	2	
187	Shailesh Shumsher Rana	Nepal	1:00.74	4	0	
188	Fabian Gregory Binns	Guyana	1:01.05	1	4	
189	Sufyan Almalki	Bahrain	1:01.25	3	1	
190	Cooper Graf	Northern Mariana Islands	1:01.30	3	4	
191	Shin Kimura	Northern Mariana Islands	1:01.86	3	5	
192	Wei Ching Maou	American Samoa	1:02.50	2	4	
193	Shameel Ibrahim	Maldives	1:02.64	3	7	
194	Prasiddha Jung Shah	Nepal	1:02.68	3	6	
195	Ali Mohamed Raaidh	Maldives	1:02.74	4	9	
196	Samson Makere	Tanzania	1:07.24	2	6	
196	Koang Gatkos Gor	Ethiopia	1:07.24	3	0	
198	Kwizera Cedric	Burundi	1:08.71	3	8	
199	Barouf Ali	Comoros	1:10.00	2	7	
200	Nsumizi Alain Boris	Burundi	1:12.70	3	9	
201	Kokou Messan Amegashie	Togo	1:14.79	2	9	
202	Mohamed Bourhanta	Djibouti	1:16.67	2	1	
–	Lansana Sidibe	Guinea	DNS	1	2	
–	Itai Chammah	Israel	DNS	1	5	
–	Aiah Emerson Mansa Musai	Sierra Leone	DNS	1	7	
–	Mamadou Cisse	Guinea	DNS	2	2	
–	Leonel Matonse	Mozambique	DNS	7	9	
–	Saif Alaslam Saeed Al-Saadi	Iraq	DSQ	2	3	
–	Fernando Medrano	Nicaragua	DSQ	7	2	
–	Omar Núñez	Nicaragua	DSQ	7	3	
–	Alexandr Sklyar	Kazakhstan	DSQ	15	7	

=== Semifinals ===
Rank	Name	Nationality	Time	Heat	Lane	Notes
1	Alain Bernard	France	47.27	1	5	
2	César Cielo	Brazil	47.48	1	6	
3	Stefan Nystrand	Sweden	47.53	1	4	
4	Nicolas Oliveira	Brazil	47.78	1	7	
5	Brent Hayden	Canada	47.88	2	3	
6	David Walters	USA	47.92	2	4	
7	Lyndon Ferns	South Africa	47.96	2	5	
8	Frédérick Bousquet	France	47.98	1	3	
9	Filippo Magnini	Italy	48.04	2	1	NR
10	Nathan Adrian	USA	48.13	1	2	
11	Matt Targett	Australia	48.15	1	1	
12	Andrey Grechin	Russia	48.18	2	2	
13	Evgeniy Lagunov	Russia	48.20	2	6	
14	Konrad Czerniak	Poland	48.22	2	8	
15	Duje Draganja	Croatia	48.25	2	7	
16	Joel Greenshields	Canada	48.73	1	8	

=== Final ===
Rank	Name	Nationality	Lane	Time	Notes
1st place, gold medalist(s)	César Cielo Filho	Brazil	5	46.91	WR
2nd place, silver medalist(s)	Alain Bernard	France	4	47.12	ER
3rd place, bronze medalist(s)	Frédérick Bousquet	France	8	47.25	
4	Brent Hayden	Canada	2	47.27	NR
5	David Walters	United States	7	47.33	NR
6	Stefan Nystrand	Sweden	3	47.37	NR
7	Lyndon Ferns	South Africa	1	47.94	
8	Nicolas Oliveira	Brazil	6	48.01	

== See also ==
- Swimming at the 2007 World Aquatics Championships – Men's 100 metre freestyle
- Swimming at the 2008 Summer Olympics – Men's 100 metre freestyle
