= Swimming at the 2009 World Aquatics Championships – Men's 50 metre freestyle =

Men's 50 metre freestyle at the 2009 FINA World Championships
- Venue: Foro Italico
- Dates: 31 July 2009 (heats, semifinals); 1 August 2009 (final)
- Competitors: 222 from 140 nations
- Winning time: 21.08 seconds

Medalists
gold medal	César Cielo Filho	Brazil
silver medal	Frédérick Bousquet	France
bronze medal	Amaury Leveaux	France

The heats for the men's 50 metre freestyle race at the 2009 World Championships took place on 31 July (heats and semifinals) and 1 August 2009 (final) at the Foro Italico in Rome, Italy.

== Records ==
Prior to this competition, the existing world and competition records were as follows:

World record	Frédérick Bousquet (FRA)	20.94	Montpellier, France	26 April 2009
Championship record	Roland Schoeman (RSA)	21.69	Montreal, Canada	30 July 2005

The following records were established during the competition:

Date	Round	Name	Nationality	Time	Record
31 July	Heat 21	George Bovell	Trinidad and Tobago	21.64	CR
31 July	Heat 22	César Cielo Filho	Brazil	21.37	CR
31 July	Semifinal 1	Duje Draganja	Croatia	21.29	CR
31 July	Semifinal 2	Frédérick Bousquet	France	21.21	CR
31 July	Swim-off	George Bovell	Trinidad and Tobago	21.20	CR
1 August	Final	César Cielo Filho	Brazil	21.08	CR

== Results ==
=== Heats ===
Rank	Name	Nationality	Time	Heat	Lane	Notes
1	César Cielo	Brazil	21.37	22	4	CR
2	Stefan Nystrand	Sweden	21.56	23	3	NR
3	Frédérick Bousquet	France	21.63	23	4	
4	George Bovell	Trinidad and Tobago	21.64	21	3	
5	Nathan Adrian	United States	21.68	22	5	
6	Amaury Leveaux	France	21.70	23	5	
7	Krisztián Takács	Hungary	21.71	22	6	
8	Duje Draganja	Croatia	21.72	21	6	
9	Roland Schoeman	South Africa	21.82	21	5	
10	Cullen Jones	United States	21.88	21	4	
11	Matthew Abood	Australia	21.90	23	2	
12	Konrad Czerniak	Poland	21.93	21	7	
13	Nicholas Santos	Brazil	21.95	22	3	
14	David Dunford	Kenya	21.96	22	8	
15	Brent Hayden	Canada	22.03	22	2	
16	Graeme Moore	South Africa	22.04	20	6	
17	Steffen Deibler	Germany	22.07	21	1	
18	Marco Orsi	Italy	22.09	23	6	
19	Barry Murphy	Ireland	22.14	18	5	NR
20	Petter Stymne	Sweden	22.18	23	0	
21	Kyle Richardson	Australia	22.21	20	7	
22	Simon Burnett	Great Britain	22.23	23	9	
23	Lukasz Gasior	Poland	22.25	23	7	
24	Ioannis Kalargaris	Greece	22.29	20	4	
25	Jacinto de Jesus Ayala	Dominican Republic	22.31	20	8	NR
25	Flori Lang	Switzerland	22.31	21	2	
27	Alexandre Agostinho	Portugal	22.36	22	9	NR
28	Alexei Puninski	Croatia	22.37	18	7	
29	Elvis Burrows	Bahamas	22.39	17	5	NR
30	Jernej Godec	Slovenia	22.41	21	8	
31	Norbert Trandafir	Romania	22.50	20	2	
32	Ranmaru Harada	Japan	22.51	19	1	
32	Apostolos Tsagkarakis	Greece	22.51	20	3	
34	Nabil Kebbab	Algeria	22.54	21	0	
35	Paulius Viktoravicius	Lithuania	22.55	16	8	
36	Kaan Tayla	Turkey	22.57	19	7	
36	Lü Zhiwu	China	22.57	20	5	
38	Vlad Razvan Caciuc	Romania	22.59	19	4	
39	Yoris Grandjean	Belgium	22.62	23	1	
40	Adam Brown	Great Britain	22.64	22	0	
41	Makoto Ito	Japan	22.66	23	8	
42	Terrence Haynes	Barbados	22.70	18	8	NR
43	Paulo Santos	Portugal	22.74	20	1	
44	Virdhawal Khade	India	22.79	20	9	
45	Brett Fraser	Cayman Islands	22.80	13	1	
46	Cai Li	China	22.81	22	1	
47	Dmytro Cherkasov	Ukraine	22.86	18	4	
48	Juan Cambindo Romanos	Colombia	22.87	18	6	
49	Nimrod Shapira Bar-Or	Israel	22.90	17	2	
50	Roman Kucik	Slovakia	22.91	15	3	
50	Mindaugas Sadauskas	Lithuania	22.91	17	1	
52	Michal Navara	Slovakia	22.93	15	7	
53	Andrejs Dūda	Latvia	22.95	13	3	NR
54	Andrei Radzionau	Belarus	22.98	19	5	
55	Roberto Gómez	Venezuela	22.99	16	3	
56	Aurelien Kunzi	Switzerland	23.00	19	3	
57	Andrii Govorov	Ukraine	23.05	17	9	
58	Roy-Allan Burch	Bermuda	23.10	16	5	
58	Jani Rusi	Finland	23.10	20	0	
60	Crox Acuña	Venezuela	23.13	16	2	
60	Joel Greenshields	Canada	23.13	19	2	
62	Stanislav Kuzmin	Kazakhstan	23.15	18	3	
62	Oliver Elliot Banados	Chile	23.15	19	8	
64	Pasha Vahdati Rad	Iran	23.21	13	5	
65	Raúl Martínez Colomer	Puerto Rico	23.28	16	6	
66	Martyn Forde	Barbados	23.30	18	1	
66	Martin Spitzer	Austria	23.30	18	9	
68	Daniil Tulupov	Uzbekistan	23.32	16	4	
68	Daniel Coakley	Philippines	23.32	19	6	
70	Cheah Geoffrey Robin	Hong Kong	23.35	17	6	
71	Dominik Koll	Austria	23.42	15	6	
72	Vladimir Sidorkin	Estonia	23.43	17	7	
73	Martín Kutscher	Uruguay	23.44	19	0	
74	Mohammad Bidarian	Iran	23.49	13	0	
74	Hycinth Cijntje	Netherlands Antilles	23.49	15	1	
74	Conor Leaney	Ireland	23.49	16	9	
77	Danil Haustov	Estonia	23.58	15	9	
77	Artur Dilman	Kazakhstan	23.58	16	1	
79	José Alberto Montoya	Costa Rica	23.63	14	1	NR
80	Nicholas Thomson	Bermuda	23.64	12	9	
80	Grant Beahan	Zimbabwe	23.64	15	8	
82	Yan Ho Chun	Hong Kong	23.68	17	8	
83	Raphaël Stacchiotti	Luxembourg	23.69	17	3	
84	Mohammed Madouh	Kuwait	23.74	19	9	
85	Mario Montoya	Costa Rica	23.75	14	2	
86	Hajder Ensar	Bosnia and Herzegovina	23.77	11	0	
86	Sidni Hoxha	Albania	23.77	17	4	
88	Branden Whitehurst	(United States Virgin Islands) Virgin Islands	23.78	9	7	
88	Miguel Nesrala	Dominican Republic	23.78	13	8	
90	Carlos Viveros Madariaga	Colombia	23.79	12	5	
90	Rodion Davelaar	Netherlands Antilles	23.79	14	6	
92	Foo Jian Beng	Malaysia	23.80	16	7	
93	Kouam Amine	Morocco	23.85	15	4	
94	Brad Hamilton	Jamaica	23.87	11	4	
95	Lao Kuan Fong	Macau	23.89	14	4	
96	Matar Samb	Senegal	23.90	13	4	
97	Marcelo Alejandro Alba	Bolivia	23.91	13	2	NR
98	Vasilii Danilov	Kyrgyzstan	23.93	18	0	
99	Mikayel Koloyan	Armenia	23.96	15	0	
100	Yellow Yeiyah	Nigeria	23.99	11	8	
101	Kendrick Uy	Philippines	24.01	15	5	
102	Su Shirong Jeffrey	Singapore	24.08	15	2	
102	Arwut Chinnapasaen	Thailand	24.08	17	0	
104	Kareem Ennab	Jordan	24.15	12	4	
105	Abdoul Khadre Mbaye Niane	Senegal	24.16	12	2	
106	Lim Clement	Singapore	24.18	13	6	
107	Luke Hall	Eswatini	24.23	12	7	
108	Petr Romashkin	Uzbekistan	24.27	14	3	
109	Glenn Victor Sutanto	Indonesia	24.34	12	3	
110	Zane Jordan	Zambia	24.35	11	7	
111	Arjun Jayaprakash	India	24.37	12	6	
112	Jonathan Wong	Jamaica	24.40	10	8	
113	Harutyun Harutyunyan	Armenia	24.50	13	7	
114	Abbas Raad	Lebanon	24.52	14	7	
115	Timothy Ferris	Zimbabwe	24.56	14	0	
116	Sergej Naumovski	Macedonia	24.57	1	5	
117	Fernando Castellanos	Guatemala	24.58	10	5	
118	Joshua Mc Leod	Trinidad and Tobago	24.59	12	0	
119	Juan Carlos Sikaffy Diaz	Honduras	24.61	11	3	
119	Iuri Iazadji	Moldova	24.61	16	0	
121	Samson Opuakpo	Nigeria	24.62	10	3	
121	Anthony Clark	Tahiti	24.62	11	5	
123	Saeed Al Jesmi	United Arab Emirates	24.64	13	9	
124	Rony Bakale	Congo	24.71	11	2	
125	Julien Brice	Saint Lucia	24.80	9	5	
126	Alexander Ray	Namibia	24.82	9	8	
127	Humoud Alhumoud	Kuwait	24.84	14	5	
128	Niall Christopher Roberts	Guyana	24.96	11	9	
129	Kailan Staal	Northern Mariana Islands	25.06	9	6	NR
130	Andrey Molchanov	Turkmenistan	25.09	10	9	
131	Wael Koubrousli	Lebanon	25.16	18	2	
132	Kari Joannesarson Hoevdanum	Faroe Islands	25.18	2	3	
133	Moh'D Aqelah	Jordan	25.22	11	6	
134	Patricio Vera	Mozambique	25.24	8	1	
135	Daniel Kevin Pryke	Papua New Guinea	25.28	8	3	
136	Ivo Chilaule	Mozambique	25.32	9	3	
136	Heshan Bandara Unamboowe	Sri Lanka	25.32	10	6	
138	Eli Ebenezer Wong	Northern Mariana Islands	25.34	8	4	
139	Omar Jasam	Bahrain	25.35	12	1	
140	Jean Hugues Gregoire	Mauritius	25.42	8	7	
141	Nicholas Coard	Grenada	25.43	8	8	
142	Andrea Agius	Malta	25.45	8	9	
143	Adama Ouedraogo	Burkina Faso	25.48	1	3	
144	Oriol Cunat	Andorra	25.49	6	4	
144	Shane Mangroo	Seychelles	25.49	8	6	
146	Peter Popahun Pokawin	Papua New Guinea	25.53	7	4	
147	Ronny Vencatachellum	Mauritius	25.55	7	1	
147	Fernando Medrano	Nicaragua	25.55	8	5	
149	Erik Rajohnson	Madagascar	25.56	11	1	
150	Diguan Pigot	Suriname	25.59	6	9	
151	Rainui Teriipaia	French Polynesia	25.68	10	4	
152	Nather Ahmed AlHamoud	Saudi Arabia	25.75	14	9	
153	Kerson Hadley	Micronesia	25.84	4	0	
154	Jesse Nilon	Samoa	25.90	7	7	
155	Edward Caruana Dingli	Malta	25.93	9	9	
156	Gary Pineda	Guatemala	25.98	7	9	
156	Sergey Krovyakov	Turkmenistan	25.98	10	0	
158	Fabian Gregory Binns	Guyana	25.99	3	9	
159	Mark Paul Thompson	Zambia	26.06	7	6	
160	Carlos Alberto	Angola	26.10	7	3	
160	Esau Simpson	Grenada	26.10	9	0	
162	Jean-Luc Augier	Saint Lucia	26.17	7	0	
163	Siu Kent Chung	Brunei	26.19	7	5	
164	Ibrahim Maliki	Niger	26.26	2	0	
164	Douglas Miller	Fiji	26.26	5	8	
166	Florenc Llanaj	Albania	26.36	10	1	
167	Tural Abbasov	Azerbaijan	26.40	7	2	
168	Ganzi Mugula	Uganda	26.42	5	7	
169	Elaijie Erasito	Fiji	26.48	7	8	
170	Quenton Dupont	Eswatini	26.49	6	7	
171	Batsaikhan Dulguun	Mongolia	26.54	9	4	
172	Ahmed Salam Ali Al-Dulaimi	Iraq	26.80	3	6	
173	Jake Villarreal	Marshall Islands	26.88	6	3	
174	Shawn Brady	Marshall Islands	27.03	6	6	
175	Saif Alaslam Saeed Al-Saadi	Iraq	27.29	3	2	
176	Narantsog Tsogjargal	Mongolia	27.47	5	3	
177	Hem Thon Ponloeu	Cambodia	27.51	6	2	
178	Fahad Alqooz	Bahrain	27.59	4	4	
179	Shailesh Shumsher Rana	Nepal	27.62	5	4	
180	Inayath Hassan	Maldives	27.68	5	1	
181	Ron Roucou	Seychelles	27.72	8	2	
182	Nadir Elmofti	Libya	27.83	6	1	
182	Mohamed Mujahid	Maldives	27.83	6	8	
184	Prasiddha Jung Shah	Nepal	27.86	6	5	
185	Dionisio Augustine II	Micronesia	27.87	3	4	
186	Maung Htet Zin	Myanmar	27.96	5	2	
187	Jules Yao Bessan	Benin	27.99	1	2	
188	Wei Ching Maou	American Samoa	28.14	5	0	
189	Abib Sereme	Mali	28.48	1	6	
190	Barouf Ali	Comoros	28.53	10	2	
191	Petero Okotai	Cook Islands	28.70	4	5	
192	Gil Alexandre Koy	Central African Republic	28.93	2	7	
193	Rama Leray Christ-Alex	Burundi	28.94	6	0	
194	Esebei Doran	Palau	28.99	3	3	
195	Sedarath Sao	Cambodia	29.07	5	9	
196	Samson Makere	Tanzania	29.31	2	8	
197	Alisher Chingizov	Tajikistan	29.46	5	5	
198	Mohamed Coulibaly	Mali	29.60	2	4	
198	Koang Gatkos Gor	Ethiopia	29.60	4	3	
200	Salum Mapunda	Tanzania	29.72	4	6	
200	Kwizera Cedric	Burundi	29.72	5	6	
202	Boubacar Alou Moussa	Niger	30.19	3	1	
203	Christian Nassif	Central African Republic	30.56	1	4	
204	Abdoulkader Houssein	Djibouti	30.71	4	1	
205	Kokou Messan Amegashie	Togo	31.41	3	8	
206	Robert Scanlan	American Samoa	31.56	4	8	
207	Saido Kamilov	Tajikistan	32.32	3	5	
208	Alberto Papus de Meideros	Benin	32.54	1	7	
209	Mohamed Ahmed Lebyadh	Mauritania	1:02.51	4	7	
—	Mpunga Mboyo Landry	DR Congo	DNS	2	1	
—	Aleksandar Jeremic	Macedonia	DNS	2	2	
—	Reginald Douglas	Saint Kitts and Nevis	DNS	2	5	
—	Abu Bakarr Jalloh	Sierra Leone	DNS	2	6	
—	Gibrilla Bamba	Sierra Leone	DNS	3	0	
—	Houmed Hassan Ali	Djibouti	DNS	3	7	
—	Modou Gaye	Mauritania	DNS	4	2	
—	Lansana Sidibe	Guinea	DNS	4	9	
—	Richard Randrianandraina	Madagascar	DNS	10	7	
—	Attoumani Aboudou	Comoros	DNS	12	8	
—	Jakob Andkjær	Denmark	DNS	21	9	
—	Yevgeny Lagunov	Russia	DNS	22	7	
—	Kalugala Vithanage	Sri Lanka	DQ	8	0	

=== Semifinals ===
Rank	Name	Nationality	Time	Heat	Lane	Notes
1	Frédérick Bousquet	France	21.21	2	5	CR
2	Duje Draganja	Croatia	21.29	1	6	
3	Amaury Leveaux	France	21.32	1	3	
4	César Cielo Filho	Brazil	21.35	2	4	
5	Cullen Jones	United States	21.40	1	2	NR
6	Stefan Nystrand	Sweden	21.45	1	4	NR
7	Nathan Adrian	United States	21.46	2	3	
8	George Bovell	Trinidad and Tobago	21.65	1	5	
8	Krisztián Takács	Hungary	21.65	2	6	
10	Nicholas Santos	Brazil	21.69	2	1	
11	Konrad Czerniak	Poland	21.72	1	7	
11	Graeme Moore	South Africa	21.72	1	8	
13	Brent Hayden	Canada	21.73	2	8	NR
14	Matthew Abood	Australia	21.74	2	7	
15	Roland Schoeman	South Africa	21.78	2	2	
16	David Dunford	Kenya	21.89	1	1	NR

==== Swim-off ====
Rank	Name	Nationality	Time	Lane	Notes
1	George Bovell	Trinidad and Tobago	21.20	4	CR, NR
2	Krisztián Takács	Hungary	21.42	5	NR

=== Final ===
Rank	Name	Nationality	Time	Lane	Notes
1st place, gold medalist(s)	César Cielo Filho	Brazil	21.08	6	CR, AM
2nd place, silver medalist(s)	Frédérick Bousquet	France	21.21	4	
3rd place, bronze medalist(s)	Amaury Leveaux	France	21.25	3	
4	Duje Draganja	Croatia	21.38	5	
5	Cullen Jones	United States	21.47	2	
6	Nathan Adrian	United States	21.49	1	
7	George Bovell	Trinidad and Tobago	21.51	8	
8	Stefan Nystrand	Sweden	21.53	7	
