= 2010 FINA World Swimming Championships (25 m) – Men's 100 metre freestyle =

Men's 100m Freestyle at the 2010 Short Course Worlds
- Dates: 18 December 2010 (heats and semifinals); 19 December 2010 (final)
- Competitors: 125
- Winning time: 45.74

Medalists
| gold medal | César Cielo | Brazil |
| silver medal | Fabien Gilot | France |
| bronze medal | Nikita Lobintsev | Russia |

The Men's 100 Freestyle at the 10th FINA World Swimming Championships (25m) was swum 18 – 19 December in Dubai, United Arab Emirates. On 18 December 125 individuals swam in the Preliminary heats in the morning, with the top-16 advancing onto Semifinals that evening. The top-8 from Semifinals then advanced to the final the next evening.

== Records ==
At the start of the event, the existing World (WR) and Championship records (CR) were as follows.

| | Name | Nation | Time | Location | Date |
|---|---|---|---|---|---|
| WR | Amaury Leveaux | France | 44.94 | Rijeka | 13 December 2008 |
| CR | Nathan Adrian | United States | 46.67 | Manchester | 13 April 2008 |

The following records were established during the competition:

| Date | Round | Name | Nation | Time | WR | CR |
|---|---|---|---|---|---|---|
| 18 December 2010 | Heats | Fabien Gilot | France | 46.62 | | CR |
| 18 December 2010 | Semifinals | César Cielo Filho | Brazil | 46.01 | | CR |
| 19 December 2010 | Final | César Cielo Filho | Brazil | 45.74 | | CR |

== Results ==
=== Heats ===
| Rank | Heat | Lane | Name | Time | Notes |
|---|---|---|---|---|---|
| 1 | 15 | 6 | Fabien Gilot (FRA) | 46.62 | Q, CR |
| 2 | 16 | 5 | Nathan Adrian (USA) | 46.66 | Q |
| 3 | 15 | 4 | César Cielo (BRA) | 46.83 | Q |
| 3 | 16 | 6 | Nikita Lobintsev (RUS) | 46.83 | Q |
| 5 | 16 | 2 | Garrett Weber-Gale (USA) | 46.94 | Q |
| 6 | 16 | 4 | Danila Izotov (RUS) | 47.00 | Q |
| 7 | 16 | 3 | Matthew Abood (AUS) | 47.03 | Q |
| 8 | 15 | 7 | Alain Bernard (FRA) | 47.04 | Q |
| 9 | 15 | 5 | Konrad Czerniak (POL) | 47.06 | Q |
| 10 | 15 | 3 | Stefan Nystrand (SWE) | 47.19 | Q |
| 11 | 14 | 2 | Kyle Richardson (AUS) | 47.23 | Q |
| 12 | 14 | 3 | Luca Dotto (ITA) | 47.32 | Q |
| 13 | 14 | 4 | Filippo Magnini (ITA) | 47.34 | Q |
| 14 | 15 | 2 | Graeme Moore (RSA) | 47.40 | Q |
| 15 | 16 | 8 | Jason Dunford (KEN) | 47.60 | Q |
| 16 | 14 | 1 | Shaune Fraser (CAY) | 47.61 | * |
| 17 | 12 | 2 | David Dunford (KEN) | 47.67 | Q |
| 18 | 14 | 6 | Nicolas Oliveira (BRA) | 47.69 | |
| 19 | 15 | 1 | Nabil Kebbab (ALG) | 47.72 | |
| 20 | 13 | 2 | Hanser García (CUB) | 47.81 | |
| 21 | 14 | 8 | Lü Zhiwu (CHN) | 47.87 | |
| 22 | 15 | 8 | Federico Grabich (ARG) | 48.20 | |
| 23 | 13 | 3 | Dominik Meichtry (SUI) | 48.29 | |
| 24 | 10 | 1 | Wong Kai Wai David (HKG) | 48.53 | |
| 25 | 13 | 6 | Shi Tengfei (CHN) | 48.59 | |
| 25 | 14 | 5 | Martin Verner (CZE) | 48.59 | |
| 25 | 16 | 7 | Alexandre Agostinho (POR) | 48.59 | |
| 28 | 10 | 7 | Velimir Stjepanović (SRB) | 48.77 | |
| 29 | 10 | 2 | Cristian Quintero (VEN) | 48.80 | |
| 30 | 14 | 7 | Michal Rubáček (CZE) | 48.82 | |
| 31 | 12 | 6 | Richard Hortness (CAN) | 48.83 | |
| 32 | 11 | 8 | Hassaan Abdel Khalik (CAN) | 48.99 | |
| 33 | 1 | 4 | Alon Mandel (ISR) | 49.04 | |
| 34 | 11 | 5 | Roberto Goméz (VEN) | 49.05 | |
| 35 | 13 | 5 | Daniil Tulupov (UZB) | 49.18 | |
| 36 | 12 | 3 | Andriy Hovorov (UKR) | 49.36 | |
| 37 | 11 | 7 | Julio Galofre (COL) | 49.42 | NR |
| 38 | 13 | 8 | Vladimir Sidorkin (EST) | 49.43 | |
| 39 | 12 | 8 | Pjotr Degtjarjov (EST) | 49.52 | |
| 40 | 13 | 4 | Thomas Ole Fadnes (NOR) | 49.53 | |
| 41 | 12 | 5 | Joshua McLeod (TRI) | 49.63 | |
| 42 | 13 | 7 | Martín Kutscher (URU) | 49.66 | |
| 43 | 1 | 6 | Ryo Takayasu (JPN) | 49.71 | |
| 44 | 12 | 4 | Artur Dilman (KAZ) | 49.72 | |
| 45 | 12 | 7 | Michal Navara (SVK) | 49.75 | |
| 46 | 13 | 1 | Gard Kvale (NOR) | 49.76 | |
| 47 | 9 | 4 | Grant Beahan (ZIM) | 49.80 | |
| 48 | 10 | 6 | Juan Cambindo (COL) | 49.83 | |
| 49 | 10 | 5 | Charles Hockin Brusquetti (PAR) | 50.01 | |
| 50 | 10 | 3 | Jean-François Schneiders (LUX) | 50.09 | |
| 51 | 11 | 1 | Ensar Hajder (BIH) | 50.12 | |
| 52 | 9 | 5 | Ryan Pini (PNG) | 50.19 | |
| 53 | 8 | 5 | Mohamed Hussein (EGY) | 50.20 | |
| 54 | 10 | 8 | Charles William Walker (PHI) | 50.30 | |
| 55 | 10 | 4 | Abdullah Altuwaini (KUW) | 50.34 | |
| 56 | 11 | 3 | Vasilii Danilov (KGZ) | 50.45 | |
| 57 | 11 | 2 | Lucas del Picolo (ARG) | 50.50 | |
| 58 | 11 | 6 | Yuan Ping (TPE) | 50.57 | |
| 59 | 11 | 4 | Petr Romashkin (UZB) | 50.65 | |
| 60 | 9 | 1 | Andrew Chetcuti (MLT) | 50.86 | |
| 61 | 9 | 8 | Yan Ho Chun (HKG) | 51.05 | |
| 62 | 8 | 4 | Sebastian Arispe (PER) | 51.12 | |
| 63 | 8 | 6 | Kevin Avila Soto (GUA) | 51.18 | |
| 64 | 8 | 2 | Abdoul Khadre Mbaye Niane (SEN) | 51.30 | |
| 65 | 7 | 3 | José Montoya (CRC) | 51.38 | |
| 66 | 9 | 6 | Mohammad Madwa (KUW) | 51.64 | |
| 67 | 7 | 7 | Hycinth Cijntje (AHO) | 51.68 | |
| 68 | 9 | 2 | Morad Berrada (MAR) | 51.74 | |
| 69 | 9 | 7 | Mikael Koloyan (ARM) | 51.93 | |
| 70 | 8 | 1 | Quinton Delie (NAM) | 52.03 | |
| 71 | 9 | 3 | Lao Kuan Fong (MAC) | 52.32 | |
| 72 | 5 | 7 | Timothy Ferris (ZIM) | 52.64 | |
| 72 | 8 | 8 | Hazem Tashkandi (KSA) | 52.64 | |
| 74 | 6 | 8 | Manuel González (PAN) | 53.04 | |
| 75 | 7 | 2 | Martín Tomasin (BOL) | 53.07 | |
| 76 | 7 | 6 | Makram Fatoul (LIB) | 53.27 | |
| 77 | 7 | 8 | Ngou Pok Man (MAC) | 53.30 | |
| 78 | 6 | 2 | Yellow Yeiyah (NGR) | 53.36 | |
| 79 | 6 | 5 | Colin Bensadon (GIB) | 53.52 | |
| 79 | 6 | 3 | Julien Brice (LCA) | 53.52 | |
| 81 | 5 | 3 | Derrick Bakhuis (AHO) | 53.60 | |
| 82 | 7 | 4 | Saeed Al Jesmi (UAE) | 53.87 | |
| 83 | 6 | 4 | Mohammed Aqelah (JOR) | 53.90 | |
| 84 | 8 | 3 | Loai Abdulwahid Tashkandi (KSA) | 53.94 | |
| 85 | 5 | 4 | Sofyan El Gadi (LBA) | 54.32 | |
| 85 | 5 | 8 | Edward Caruana Dingli (MLT) | 54.32 | |
| 87 | 5 | 5 | James Sanderson (GIB) | 54.35 | |
| 88 | 5 | 6 | Andrey Molchanov (TKM) | 54.36 | |
| 89 | 5 | 2 | Samer Kamal (JOR) | 54.42 | |
| 90 | 4 | 5 | Ahmed Ajwad Abdouh Alkarem (IRQ) | 54.43 | |
| 91 | 8 | 7 | Faisal Al Jasmi (UAE) | 54.75 | |
| 92 | 6 | 1 | Joshua Runako Daniel (LCA) | 54.77 | |
| 93 | 7 | 1 | Nuno Miguel Rola (ANG) | 54.78 | |
| 94 | 4 | 6 | Mark Thompson (ZAM) | 54.80 | |
| 95 | 7 | 5 | Mario Sulkja (ALB) | 55.12 | |
| 96 | 6 | 6 | Jurgen Fici (ALB) | 55.67 | |
| 97 | 1 | 2 | Harutyun Banduryan (ARM) | 56.52 | |
| 98 | 4 | 4 | Omar Núñez (NCA) | 56.71 | |
| 99 | 4 | 3 | Anderson Lim (BRU) | 56.82 | |
| 100 | 2 | 2 | Kouassi Brou (CIV) | 56.85 | |
| 101 | 1 | 3 | Tepaia Payne (COK) | 56.98 | |
| 102 | 4 | 7 | Ronaldo Rodrigues (GUY) | 57.64 | |
| 103 | 5 | 1 | Israr Hussain (PAK) | 57.86 | |
| 104 | 4 | 2 | Mohammed Bahrin Behrom Shem (BRU) | 57.96 | |
| 105 | 3 | 2 | Hilal Hemed Hilal (TAN) | 59.48 | |
| 106 | 1 | 5 | Adama Ouedraogo (BUR) | 59.66 | NR |
| 107 | 4 | 8 | Ron Albert Roucou (SEY) | 1:00.10 | |
| 108 | 3 | 5 | Inayath Hassan (MDV) | 1:00.23 | |
| 109 | 2 | 6 | Tano Pierre Claver Atta (CIV) | 1:00.28 | |
| 110 | 2 | 8 | Giordan Harris (MHL) | 1:00.59 | |
| 111 | 3 | 3 | Daisuke Ssegwanyi (UGA) | 1:01.72 | |
| 112 | 4 | 1 | Shailesh Shumsher Rana (NEP) | 1:01.97 | |
| 113 | 3 | 6 | Conrad Gaira (UGA) | 1:04.60 | |
| 114 | 2 | 1 | Mamadou Fofana (MLI) | 1:05.01 | |
| 115 | 2 | 4 | Adam David Kitururu (TAN) | 1:06.85 | |
| 116 | 2 | 7 | Mohamed Coulibaly (MLI) | 1:08.53 | |
| 117 | 2 | 5 | Alisher Chingizov (TJK) | 1:10.00 | |
| 118 | 3 | 1 | Godonou Wilfrid Tevoedjre (BEN) | 1:11.23 | |
| 119 | 2 | 3 | Ndinga Anauska Jynior (CGO) | 1:12.87 | |
| | 3 | 4 | Athoumani Youssouf (COM) | DNS | |
| | 3 | 7 | Ahmed Chawali (COM) | DNS | |
| | 3 | 8 | Sergelen Tegshee (MGL) | DNS | |
| | 6 | 7 | Khachik Plavchiyan (ARM) | DNS | |
| | 12 | 1 | Masayuki Kishida (JPN) | DNS | |
| | 16 | 1 | Lars Frölander (SWE) | DNS | |

- Fraser scratched the semifinals, so Dunford (17th) advanced to the semifinals in his place.

=== Semifinals ===
| Rank | Heat | Lane | Name | Nationality | Time | Notes |
|---|---|---|---|---|---|---|
| 1 | 2 | 5 | César Cielo | Brazil | 46.01 | Q, CR |
| 2 | 2 | 4 | Fabien Gilot | France | 46.11 | Q |
| 3 | 2 | 6 | Matthew Abood | Australia | 46.61 | Q |
| 4 | 1 | 6 | Alain Bernard | France | 46.71 | Q |
| 5 | 1 | 2 | Stefan Nystrand | Sweden | 46.75 | Q |
| 6 | 1 | 7 | Luca Dotto | Italy | 46.93 | Q |
| 7 | 1 | 5 | Nikita Lobintsev | Russia | 46.98 | Q |
| 8 | 1 | 4 | Nathan Adrian | United States | 46.99 | Q |
| 9 | 1 | 1 | Graeme Moore | South Africa | 47.01 | |
| 10 | 2 | 2 | Konrad Czerniak | Poland | 47.08 | |
| 10 | 2 | 3 | Garrett Weber-Gale | United States | 47.08 | |
| 12 | 2 | 1 | Filippo Magnini | Italy | 47.12 | |
| 13 | 1 | 3 | Danila Izotov | Russia | 47.18 | |
| 14 | 1 | 8 | David Dunford | Kenya | 47.23 | |
| 15 | 2 | 7 | Kyle Richardson | Australia | 47.27 | |
| 16 | 2 | 8 | Jason Dunford | Kenya | 47.49 | |

=== Final ===
| Rank | Lane | Name | Nationality | Time | Notes |
|---|---|---|---|---|---|
| 1st place, gold medalist(s) | 4 | César Cielo | Brazil | 45.74 | CR, SA |
| 2nd place, silver medalist(s) | 5 | Fabien Gilot | France | 45.97 | |
| 3rd place, bronze medalist(s) | 1 | Nikita Lobintsev | Russia | 46.35 | |
| 4 | 6 | Alain Bernard | France | 46.37 | |
| 5 | 3 | Matthew Abood | Australia | 46.40 | |
| 6 | 8 | Nathan Adrian | United States | 46.44 | |
| 7 | 7 | Luca Dotto | Italy | 46.68 | |
| 8 | 2 | Stefan Nystrand | Sweden | 46.81 | |
