= 2010 FINA World Swimming Championships (25 m) – Men's 50 metre freestyle =

Men's 50m Freestyle at the 2010 Short Course Worlds
- Dates: 16 December (heats and semifinals); 17 December (final)
- Competitors: 136
- Winning time: 20.51

Medalists
gold medal	César Cielo	Brazil
silver medal	Frédérick Bousquet	France
bronze medal	Josh Schneider	United States

The Men's 50 Freestyle at the 10th FINA World Swimming Championships (25m) was swum 16–17 December 2010 in Dubai, United Arab Emirates. Preliminary heats and semifinals of the event were on 16 December; the final on 17 December.

At the start of the event, the existing World (WR) and Championship records (CR) were as follows.

	Name	Nation	Time	Location	Date
WR	Roland Schoeman	South Africa	20.30	Pietermaritzburg	8 August 2009
CR	Duje Draganja	Croatia	20.81	Manchester	11 April 2008

The following records were established during the competition:

Date	Round	Name	Nation	Time	WR	CR
16 December 2010	Semifinals	César Cielo Filho	Brazil	20.61		CR
17 December 2010	Final	César Cielo Filho	Brazil	20.51		CR

== Results ==
=== Preliminary heats ===
Rank	Heat	Lane	Name	Time	Notes
1	16	4	César Cielo (BRA)	21.06	Q
2	17	5	Nathan Adrian (USA)	21.11	Q
3	17	4	Frédérick Bousquet (FRA)	21.12	Q
4	16	1	George Bovell (TRI)	21.23	Q
5	15	5	Steffen Deibler (GER)	21.38	Q
6	17	6	Stefan Nystrand (SWE)	21.41	Q
7	15	4	Sergey Fesikov (RUS)	21.43	Q
7	15	7	Alain Bernard (FRA)	21.43	Q
7	17	2	Josh Schneider (USA)	21.43	Q
10	15	2	Kyle Richardson (AUS)	21.45	Q
11	17	1	Matthew Abood (AUS)	21.48	Q
12	15	3	Andrii Govorov (UKR)	21.61	Q
13	16	5	Marco Orsi (ITA)	21.66	Q
14	16	3	Masayuki Kishida (JPN)	21.67	*
15	17	3	Roland Mark Schoeman (RSA)	21.70	Q
16	16	2	Nicholas Santos (BRA)	21.71	Q
17	16	6	Luca Dotto (ITA)	21.72	Q
18	16	7	Nikita Konovalov (RUS)	21.86	
19	17	7	Alexandre Agostinho (POR)	21.89	
20	17	8	Lucas del Picolo (ARG)	21.90	
21	14	5	Federico Grabich (ARG)	21.91	
22	13	2	David Dunford (KEN)	21.95	
22	14	4	Lü Zhiwu (CHN)	21.95	
24	15	1	Graeme Moore (RSA)	21.99	
25	15	6	Martin Spitzer (AUT)	22.00	
26	13	5	Shi Runqiang (CHN)	22.07	
27	15	8	Nabil Kebbab (ALG)	22.08	
28	11	8	Jake Tapp (CAN)	22.10	
29	13	7	Hanser García (CUB)	22.13	
30	10	4	Octavio Alesi (VEN)	22.15	
30	13	8	Roman Kucik (SVK)	22.15	
32	16	8	Andrejs Dūda (LAT)	22.16	
33	14	6	Pjotr Degtjarjov (EST)	22.18	
34	12	1	Richard Hortness (CAN)	22.22	
35	11	6	Velimir Stjepanović (SRB)	22.29	
36	14	7	Joshua McLeod (TRI)	22.34	
36	14	8	Elvis Burrows (BAH)	22.34	
38	14	2	Thomas Ole Fadnes (NOR)	22.39	
39	12	3	Roberto Goméz (VEN)	22.44	
40	2	1	Alon Mandel (ISR)	22.45	
41	12	4	Juan Cambindo (COL)	22.50	
42	13	3	Vladimir Sidorkin (EST)	22.62	
43	13	1	Daniel Coakley (PHI)	22.65	
44	14	3	Daniil Tulupov (UZB)	22.70	
45	14	1	Michal Navara (SVK)	22.73	
46	10	6	Julio Galofre (COL)	22.74	
47	12	5	Artur Dilman (KAZ)	22.80	
48	13	4	Yan Ho Chun (HKG)	22.86	
49	11	1	Charles William Walker (PHI)	22.87	
49	12	8	Petr Romashkin (UZB)	22.87	
51	10	5	Grant Beahan (ZIM)	22.94	
51	12	7	Lao Kuan Fong (MAC)	22.94	
53	12	6	Martín Kutscher (URU)	23.05	
54	10	1	Andrew Chetcuti (MLT)	23.14	
54	12	2	Mohammad Madwa (KUW)	23.14	
56	9	6	Sebastian Arispe (PER)	23.16	
57	10	7	Hycinth Cijntje (AHO)	23.19	
57	11	5	Ryan Pini (PNG)	23.19	
57	11	4	Amine Kouame (MAR)	23.19	
60	10	3	Abdoul Khadre Mbaye Niane (SEN)	23.35	
61	11	3	Alexandre Bakhtiarov (CYP)	23.39	
62	9	4	Timothy Ferris (ZIM)	23.50	
63	11	7	Ahmed Khalfan (UAE)	23.51	
64	9	3	José Montoya (CRC)	23.57	
65	8	6	Kevin Avila Soto (GUA)	23.78	
66	9	5	Mikael Koloyan (ARM)	23.79	
67	7	5	Mohammed Aqelah (JOR)	23.83	
67	7	1	Andrea Agius (MLT)	23.83	
69	7	3	Manuel González (PAN)	23.86	
70	8	1	Hazem Tashkandi (KSA)	24.03	
71	9	2	Yellow Yeiyah (NGR)	24.04	
72	8	5	Martín Tomasin (BOL)	24.05	
73	10	2	Saeed Al Jesmi (UAE)	24.16	
74	7	4	Andrey Molchanov (TKM)	24.36	
75	3	7	Mohammed Alkhadhuri (OMA)	24.39	
76	8	4	Julien Brice (LCA)	24.55	
76	8	2	Lim Duan Le Kenneth (SIN)	24.55	
78	8	8	Lin Shih-Chieh (TPE)	24.61	
79	10	8	Makram Fatoul (LIB)	24.73	
80	5	7	Ahmed Ajwad Abdouh Alkarem (IRQ)	24.82	
81	8	7	Ngou Pok Man (MAC)	24.87	
82	8	3	Joshua Runako Daniel (LCA)	24.93	
83	7	2	Mark Thompson (ZAM)	24.96	
84	6	4	Samer Kamal (JOR)	25.01	
85	1	8	Harutyun Banduryan (ARM)	25.03	
86	9	1	Mario Sulkja (ALB)	25.13	
87	6	7	Derrick Bakhuis (AHO)	25.17	
88	5	6	Dulguun Batsaikhan (MGL)	25.25	
89	7	6	Colin Bensadon (GIB)	25.28	
90	6	3	Nuno Miguel Rola (ANG)	25.36	
91	6	2	Erik Rajohnson (MAD)	25.39	
92	3	8	Ahmed Atari (QAT)	25.45	
93	5	3	Lim Jyh Jye (BRU)	25.62	
94	1	1	Tepaia Payne (COK)	25.84	
95	7	7	Jurgen Fici (ALB)	25.93	
96	2	3	Kouassi Brou (CIV)	25.95	
97	6	6	Alejandro Atoigue (GUM)	25.98	
98	5	4	Omar Núñez (NCA)	26.22	
99	4	6	Hilal Hemed Hilal (TAN)	26.31	
100	5	2	Ahmad Dumairi (PLE)	26.38	
101	5	8	Ronaldo Rodrigues (GUY)	26.40	
102	5	5	Mohammed Bahrin Behrom Shem (BRU)	26.48	
103	2	8	Zin Maung Htet (MYA)	26.59	
104	1	7	Aung Zaw Phyo (MYA)	26.65	
105	6	1	Ron Albert Roucou (SEY)	26.75	
106	5	1	Inayath Hassan (MDV)	26.83	
107	2	4	Dionisio Augustine II (FSM)	26.96	
108	4	2	Chamraen Youri Maximov (CAM)	27.03	
109	4	7	Giordan Harris (MHL)	27.16	
110	4	3	Daisuke Ssegwanyi (UGA)	27.21	
111	6	8	Muhammad Abbas Hussain (PAK)	27.42	
112	1	3	Soulasen Phommasen (LAO)	27.59	
113	4	4	Shailesh Shumsher Rana (NEP)	27.74	
114	9	7	Jackson Niyomugabo (RWA)	27.86	
115	7	8	Athoumani Youssouf (COM)	28.06	
116	4	5	Conrad Gaira (UGA)	28.10	
117	2	2	Mamadou Fofana (MLI)	28.18	
118	4	8	Adam David Kitururu (TAN)	28.33	
119	1	6	Rhudii Ayi Mensah Quaye (GHA)	28.75	
120	3	2	Alisher Chingizov (TJK)	28.91	
121	2	6	Mohamed Coulibaly (MLI)	29.60	
122	1	5	Adama Ouedraogo (BUR)	29.83	NR
123	3	1	Ndinga Anauska Jynior (CGO)	29.85	
124	3	4	Godonou Wilfrid Tevoedjre (BEN)	30.23	
125	6	5	Ahmed Chawali (COM)	31.55	
126	2	7	Dangassat Iglay Arnaud (CGO)	32.05	
127	3	5	Nelson Masang (PLW)	32.19	
128	4	1	Mohamed Osman (DJI)	33.79	
129	1	2	Sergelen Tegshee (MGL)	34.58	
130	1	4	Teddy Mbolidi (CAF)	40.84	
	3	6	Hamza Ahmed Labeid (MTN)	DSQ	
	2	5	Bernard Ray Atsu Blewudzi (GHA)	DNS	
	3	3	Baheida Abeid (MTN)	DNS	
	9	8	Khachik Plavchiyan (ARM)	DNS	
	11	2	Sverre Naess (NOR)	DNS	
	13	6	Jason Dunford (KEN)	DNS	

* Kishida scratched the semifinals, so Dotto (17th) advanced to the semifinals in his place.

=== Semifinals ===
Rank	Heat	Lane	Name	Nationality	Time	Notes
1	2	4	César Cielo	Brazil	20.61	Q, CR, AM
2	2	1	Marco Orsi	Italy	21.10	Q
3	2	5	Frédérick Bousquet	France	21.17	Q
4	1	8	Luca Dotto	Italy	21.25	Q
5	2	3	Steffen Deibler	Germany	21.25	Q
6	1	6	Alain Bernard	France	21.26	Q
6	2	6	Sergey Fesikov	Russia	21.26	Q
8	1	2	Kyle Richardson	Australia	21.29	?
8	2	2	Josh Schneider	United States	21.29	?
10	1	5	George Bovell	Trinidad and Tobago	21.33	
11	1	4	Nathan Adrian	United States	21.35	
12	1	3	Stefan Nystrand	Sweden	21.37	
13	2	8	Nicholas Santos	Brazil	21.43	
14	2	7	Matthew Abood	Australia	21.48	
15	1	1	Roland Mark Schoeman	South Africa	21.57	
16	1	7	Andrii Govorov	Ukraine	21.78	

==== Swim-off ====
Rank	Lane	Name	Nationality	Time	Notes
1	4	Josh Schneider	United States	21.19	Q
2	5	Kyle Richardson	Australia	21.28	

=== Final ===
Rank	Lane	Name	Nationality	Time	Notes
1st place, gold medalist(s)	4	César Cielo	Brazil	20.51	CR, AM
2nd place, silver medalist(s)	3	Frédérick Bousquet	France	20.81	
3rd place, bronze medalist(s)	8	Josh Schneider	United States	20.88	
4	2	Steffen Deibler	Germany	20.97	
5	5	Marco Orsi	Italy	21.00	
6	7	Alain Bernard	France	21.20	
7	1	Sergey Fesikov	Russia	21.23	
8	6	Luca Dotto	Italy	21.37	
