= Swimming at the 2012 European Aquatics Championships – Men's 50 metre freestyle =

Men's 50 metre freestyle at the 2012 European Aquatics Championships
- Dates: May 26, 2012 (heats and semifinals); May 27, 2012 (final)
- Competitors: 48 from 26 nations
- Winning time: 21.80

Medalists
gold medal	Frédérick Bousquet	France
silver medal	Stefan Nystrand	Sweden
bronze medal	Andriy Govorov	Ukraine

The men's 50 metre freestyle competition of the swimming events at the 2012 European Aquatics Championships took place May 26 and 27. The heats and semifinals took place on May 26, the final on May 27.

== Records ==
Prior to the competition, the existing world, European and championship records were as follows.

	Name	Nation	Time	Location	Date
World record	César Cielo	Brazil	20.91	São Paulo	December 18, 2009
European record	Frédérick Bousquet	France	20.94	Montpellier	April 26, 2009
Championship record	Frédérick Bousquet	France	21.36	Budapest	August 14, 2010

== Results ==
=== Heats ===
53 swimmers participated in 7 heats.

Rank	Heat	Lane	Name	Nationality	Time	Notes
1	7	4	Frédérick Bousquet	France	22.29	Q
2	6	5	Marco Orsi	Italy	22.30	Q
3	6	4	Alain Bernard	France	22.31	Q
4	5	5	Stefan Nystrand	Sweden	22.33	Q
5	6	1	Ari-Pekka Liukkonen	Finland	22.38	Q, NR
6	6	6	Andrea Rolla	Italy	22.39	Q
7	7	5	Krisztián Takács	Hungary	22.40	Q
8	7	3	Andriy Govorov	Ukraine	22.41	Q
9	7	7	Dominik Kozma	Hungary	22.43	Q
10	5	2	Norbert Trandafir	Romania	22.45	Q, =NR
11	5	6	Lucio Spadaro	Italy	22.50	
12	4	4	Kristian Golomeev	Greece	22.54	Q
13	5	4	Amaury Leveaux	France	22.61	
14	7	6	Marco di Carli	Germany	22.66	Q
15	5	8	Flori Lang	Switzerland	22.70	Q
16	6	8	Filip Wypych	Poland	22.70	Q
17	6	7	Jasper Aerents	Belgium	22.75	Q
18	6	2	Oleg Tikhobaev	Russia	22.79	Q
19	7	1	Petter Stymne	Sweden	22.81	
20	5	3	Vitaly Syrnikov	Russia	22.82	
21	3	8	Ivan Levaj	Croatia	22.87	
22	4	3	Mario Todorović	Croatia	22.89	
23	7	2	Steffen Deibler	Germany	22.89	
24	4	7	Árni Már Árnason	Iceland	22.91	
25	5	7	Yoris Grandjean	Belgium	22.91	
26	4	8	Fotios Koliopoulos	Greece	22.93	
27	7	8	Christoph Fildebrandt	Germany	22.93	
28	3	3	Boris Stojanović	Serbia	22.98	
29	5	1	Duje Draganja	Croatia	23.00	
30	4	5	Alexandre Escudier Agostinho	Portugal	23.08	
31	3	4	Aurelien Künzi	Switzerland	23.11	
32	3	6	Roman Kucik	Slovakia	23.13	
33	4	1	Pjotr Degtjarjov	Estonia	23.13	
34	4	2	Mindaugas Sadauskas	Lithuania	23.21	
35	3	1	Uvis Kalnins	Latvia	23.26	
36	1	2	Alon Mandel	Israel	23.31	
37	3	5	Martin Spitzer	Austria	23.32	
38	3	7	Simonas Bilis	Lithuania	23.33	
39	2	6	Richárd Bohus	Hungary	23.33	
40	2	8	Viktar Vabishchevich	Belarus	23.42	
41	2	3	Arseni Kukharau	Belarus	23.47	
42	1	6	Viacheslav Andrusenko	Russia	23.67	
43	2	2	Justinas Bilis	Lithuania	23.68	
44	2	7	Tadas Duškinas	Lithuania	23.75	
45	1	5	Evgheni Coroliuc	Moldova	23.77	
46	1	4	Hedin Olsen	Faroe Islands	24.18	
47	2	1	Matej Kuchar	Slovakia	24.41	
48	1	3	Matti Mattsson	Finland	24.87	
	2	4	Martin Verner	Czech Republic	DNS	
	2	5	Aleksander Hetland	Norway	DNS	
	3	2	Nimrod Shapira Bar-Or	Israel	DNS	
	4	6	Tiago Venâncio	Portugal	DNS	
	6	3	Ioannis Kalargaris	Greece	DNS	

=== Semifinals ===
The eight fasters swimmers advanced to the final.

==== Semifinal 1 ====
Rank	Lane	Name	Nationality	Time	Notes
1	5	Stefan Nystrand	Sweden	22.06	Q
2	6	Andriy Govorov	Ukraine	22.20	Q
3	4	Marco Orsi	Italy	22.22	Q
4	2	Norbert Trandafir	Romania	22.33	Q, NR
5	7	Marco di Carli	Germany	22.43	
6	3	Andrea Rolla	Italy	22.44	
7	8	Oleg Tikhobaev	Russia	22.53	
8	1	Filip Wypych	Poland	22.55	

==== Semifinal 2 ====
Rank	Lane	Name	Nationality	Time	Notes
1	4	Frédérick Bousquet	France	22.22	Q
2	3	Ari-Pekka Liukkonen	Finland	22.24	Q, NR
3	5	Alain Bernard	France	22.26	Q
4	7	Kristian Golomeev	Greece	22.37	Q
5	6	Krisztián Takács	Hungary	22.40	
6	8	Jasper Aerents	Belgium	22.49	
7	2	Dominik Kozma	Hungary	22.51	
8	1	Flori Lang	Switzerland	22.59	

=== Final ===
The final was held at 17:05.

Rank	Lane	Name	Nationality	Time	Notes
1st place, gold medalist(s)	6	Frédérick Bousquet	France	21.80	
2nd place, silver medalist(s)	4	Stefan Nystrand	Sweden	22.04	
3rd place, bronze medalist(s)	5	Andriy Govorov	Ukraine	22.18	
4	2	Ari-Pekka Liukkonen	Finland	22.22	NR
4	3	Marco Orsi	Italy	22.22	
4	8	Kristian Golomeev	Greece	22.22	
7	7	Alain Bernard	France	22.24	
8	1	Norbert Trandafir	Romania	22.65	
