= Swimming at the 2008 Summer Olympics – Men's 100 metre freestyle =

Men's 100 metre freestyle at the Games of the XXIX Olympiad
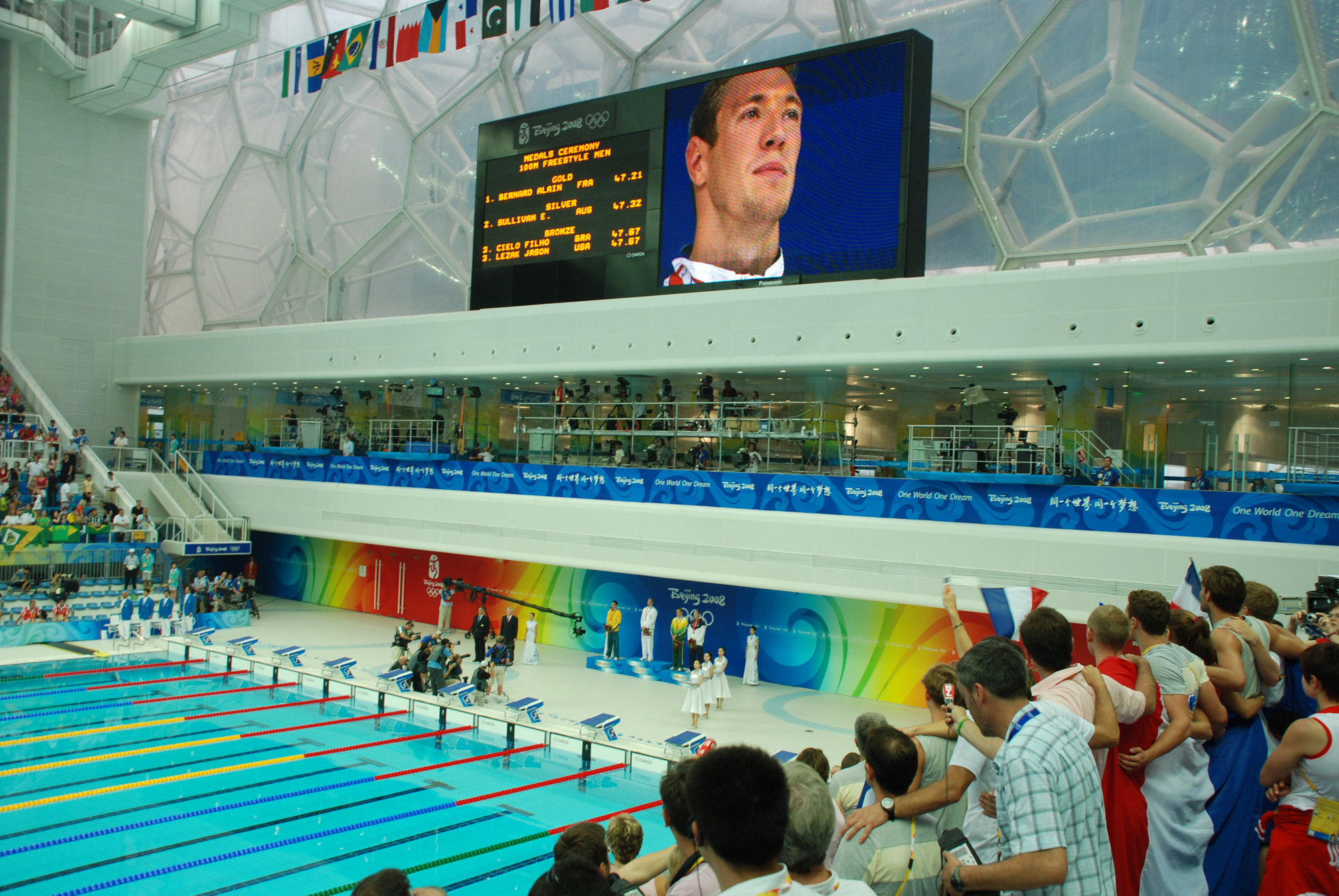
- Medal ceremony
- Venue: Beijing National Aquatics Centre
- Dates: August 12, 2008 (heats); August 13, 2008 (semifinals); August 14, 2008 (final)
- Competitors: 64 from 55 nations
- Winning time: 47.21

Medalists
1st place, gold medalist(s)		Alain Bernard; France
2nd place, silver medalist(s)		Eamon Sullivan; Australia
3rd place, bronze medalist(s)		César Cielo; Brazil
3rd place, bronze medalist(s)		Jason Lezak; United States

The men's 100 metre freestyle event at the 2008 Olympic Games took place on 12–14 August at the Beijing National Aquatics Center in Beijing, China. There were 64 competitors from 55 nations.

== Summary ==
Alain Bernard stormed home on the final lap to claim France's first ever gold medal in the event with a time of 47.21. Australia's world record holder Eamon Sullivan enjoyed a great start in the first 50 metres, but ended up with a silver in 47.32, just 0.11 of a second behind Bernard. U.S. swimmer Jason Lezak and Brazil's César Cielo tied for the bronze medal in a matching time of 47.67.

Two-time defending champion Pieter van den Hoogenband finished the race in fifth place at 47.75. Although he missed an opportunity to attain a third straight triumph in the same event, Van den Hoogenband became the first ever swimmer to reach the final at his fourth Olympics. Four months later, he announced his retirement from the sport, ending an Olympic career with a total of seven medals, including three golds.

Van den Hoogenband was followed in sixth by South Africa's Lyndon Ferns (48.04), and in seventh by Sullivan's teammate Matt Targett (48.20). After missing out the semifinals in Athens four years earlier, Sweden's Stefan Nystrand rounded out the finale to eighth place in 48.33.

Earlier in the semifinals, Bernard and Sullivan exchanged world-record performances to set up a battle race for the final. Swimming in the first heat, Bernard delivered a time of 47.20 to erase a 0.04-second standard set by Sullivan during his lead-off leg in the 4 × 100 m freestyle relay. A few minutes later, Sullivan had taken back the record in the second semifinal at 47.05. In addition, 2007 World Champions Brent Hayden and Filippo Magnini failed to advance to the final, despite swimming times faster than their World Championship-winning time.

== Background ==
This was the 25th appearance of the men's 100 metre freestyle. The event has been held at every Summer Olympics except 1900 (when the shortest freestyle was the 200 metres), though the 1904 version was measured in yards rather than metres.

Four of the eight finalists from the 2004 Games returned: two-time gold medalist Pieter van den Hoogenband of the Netherlands, fourth-place finisher Ryk Neethling of South Africa, fifth-place finisher Filippo Magnini of Italy, and sixth-place finisher Duje Draganja of Croatia.

While van den Hoogenband was the returning champion, the clear favorites in the event were Frenchman Alain Bernard and Australian Eamon Sullivan. Bernard had broken the Dutch swimmer's world record, with Sullivan coming within 0.02 seconds of Bernard's new record.

Armenia, Aruba, the Cayman Islands, Kenya, and Serbia each made their debut in the event. The United States made its 24th appearance, most of any nation, having missed only the boycotted 1980 Games.

== Qualification ==
Each National Olympic Committee (NOC) could enter up to two swimmers if both met the A qualifying standard, or one swimmer if he met the B standard. For 2008, the A standard was 49.23 seconds while the B standard was 50.95 seconds. The qualifying window was 15 March 2007 to 15 July 2008; only approved meets (generally international competitions and national Olympic trials) during that period could be used to meet the standards. There were also universality places available; if no male swimmer from a nation qualified in any event, the NOC could enter one male swimmer in an event.

The two swimmers per NOC limit had been in place since the 1984 Games.

== Competition format ==
This freestyle swimming competition consisted of three rounds: heats, semifinals, and a final. The swimmers with the best 16 times in the heats advanced to the semifinals. The swimmers with the best 8 times in the semifinals advanced to the final. Swim-offs were used as necessary to break ties for advancement to the next round.

== Records ==
Prior to this competition, the existing world and Olympic records were as follows:

World record	Alain Bernard (FRA)	47.50	Eindhoven, Netherlands	22 March 2008
Olympic record	Pieter van den Hoogenband (NED)	47.84	Sydney, Australia	19 September 2000

The following records were set during this competition:

Date	Event	Name	Nationality	Time	Record
10 August	Heat 2*	Amaury Leveaux	France	47.76	OR
11 August	Final*	Eamon Sullivan	Australia	47.24	WR
13 August	Semifinal 1	Alain Bernard	France	47.20	WR
13 August	Semifinal 2	Eamon Sullivan	Australia	47.05	WR

* Split from the men's 4 × 100 m freestyle relay

== Schedule ==
The competition moved to a three-day schedule, rather than two days as in the past.

All times are China Standard Time (UTC+8)

Date	Time	Round
Tuesday, 12 August 2008	18:30	Heats
Wednesday, 13 August 2008	10:00	Semifinals
Thursday, 14 August 2008	10:51	Final

== Results ==
=== Heats ===
Rank	Heat	Lane	Swimmer	Nation	Time	Notes
1	8	4	Eamon Sullivan	Australia	47.80	Q
2	8	5	Stefan Nystrand	Sweden	47.83	Q, NR
3	7	6	Brent Hayden	Canada	47.84	Q
4	9	4	Alain Bernard	France	47.85	Q
5	8	6	Pieter van den Hoogenband	Netherlands	47.97	Q
6	7	8	Milorad Čavić	Serbia	48.15	Q, NR, WD
7	8	3	César Cielo	Brazil	48.16	Q
8	9	5	Garrett Weber-Gale	United States	48.19	Q
9	9	7	Lyndon Ferns	South Africa	48.26	Q
10	7	3	Filippo Magnini	Italy	48.30	Q
11	7	4	Jason Lezak	United States	48.33	Q
12	9	6	Matt Targett	Australia	48.40	Q
13	7	5	Fabien Gilot	France	48.42	Q
14	8	2	Andrey Grechin	Russia	48.50	Q
15	9	8	Jonas Persson	Sweden	48.51	Q
16	7	7	Dominik Meichtry	Switzerland	48.55	Q, NR
16	8	8	Christian Galenda	Italy	48.55	Q
18	9	3	Yevgeny Lagunov	Russia	48.59	
19	7	1	Yoris Grandjean	Belgium	48.82	
20	6	8	George Bovell	Trinidad and Tobago	48.83	
21	5	6	Martin Verner	Czech Republic	48.95	
22	6	5	Albert Subirats	Venezuela	48.97	NR
23	8	1	Joel Greenshields	Canada	49.04	
24	4	4	Jason Dunford	Kenya	49.06	
25	6	1	Chen Zuo	China	49.08	
26	4	5	Nimrod Shapira Bar-Or	Israel	49.10	
27	9	1	Jakob Andkjær	Denmark	49.25	
28	5	5	Balázs Makány	Hungary	49.27	
28	5	7	Paulius Viktoravicius	Lithuania	49.27	
30	8	7	Ryk Neethling	South Africa	49.28	
31	4	6	Peter Mankoč	Slovenia	49.33	
32	6	3	Nabil Kebbab	Algeria	49.38	
33	9	2	Steffen Deibler	Germany	49.39	
34	7	2	Duje Draganja	Croatia	49.49	
35	6	2	José Meolans	Argentina	49.50	
36	5	1	Shaune Fraser	Cayman Islands	49.56	
36	6	7	Yuriy Yegoshin	Ukraine	49.56	
38	6	4	Mitja Zastrow	Netherlands	49.61	
39	4	1	Ryan Pini	Papua New Guinea	49.72	NR
40	6	6	Hisayoshi Sato	Japan	49.85	
41	4	3	Matti Rajakylä	Finland	49.91	
42	3	4	Virdhawal Khade	India	50.07	
43	5	2	Martín Kutscher	Uruguay	50.08	
44	5	3	Stanislau Neviarouski	Belarus	50.14	
45	5	4	Tiago Venâncio	Portugal	50.30	
46	3	2	Romāns Miloslavskis	Latvia	50.40	
47	3	3	Terrence Haynes	Barbados	50.50	NR
48	4	8	Aristeidis Grigoriadis	Greece	50.62	
49	5	8	Örn Arnarson	Iceland	50.68	
50	4	2	Norbert Trandafir	Romania	50.74	
51	4	7	Danil Haustov	Estonia	50.92	
52	3	7	Alexandr Sklyar	Kazakhstan	51.24	
53	2	6	Jan Roodzant	Aruba	51.69	
54	3	6	Lim Nam-gyun	South Korea	51.80	
55	3	1	Petr Romashkin	Uzbekistan	51.83	
56	2	3	Mikael Koloyan	Armenia	51.89	
57	2	2	Gael Adam	Mauritius	52.35	
58	2	5	Carl Probert	Fiji	52.37	
59	3	8	Christopher Duenas	Guam	52.64	
60	2	4	Roy-Allan Burch	Bermuda	52.65	
61	2	7	Obaid Al-Jasmi	United Arab Emirates	53.29	NR
62	1	3	Emile Bakale	Republic of the Congo	55.08	
63	1	4	Miguel Angel Navarro	Bolivia	56.96	
64	1	5	Sofyan El Gadi	Libya	57.89	

=== Semifinals ===
Bernard held the world record only briefly, setting it in the first semifinal heat before Sullivan broke it in the second heat.

Rank	Heat	Lane	Swimmer	Nation	Time	Notes
1	2	4	Eamon Sullivan	Australia	47.05	Q, WR
2	1	5	Alain Bernard	France	47.20	Q, ER
3	2	3	Pieter van den Hoogenband	Netherlands	47.68	Q, NR
4	2	7	Matt Targett	Australia	47.88	Q
5	1	4	Stefan Nystrand	Sweden	47.91	Q
6	1	2	Jason Lezak	United States	47.98	Q
7	1	6	Lyndon Ferns	South Africa	48.00	Q, AF
8	1	3	César Cielo	Brazil	48.07	Q
9	2	2	Filippo Magnini	Italy	48.11	
10	2	6	Garrett Weber-Gale	United States	48.12	
11	2	5	Brent Hayden	Canada	48.20	
12	1	8	Christian Galenda	Italy	48.47	
13	1	1	Jonas Persson	Sweden	48.59	
14	2	1	Andrey Grechin	Russia	48.71	
15	1	7	Fabien Gilot	France	49.00	
16	2	8	Dominik Meichtry	Switzerland	49.58	

=== Final ===
Rank	Lane	Swimmer	Nation	Time	Notes
1st place, gold medalist(s)	5	Alain Bernard	France	47.21	
2nd place, silver medalist(s)	4	Eamon Sullivan	Australia	47.32	
3rd place, bronze medalist(s)	7	Jason Lezak	United States	47.67	
3rd place, bronze medalist(s)	8	César Cielo	Brazil	47.67	SA
5	3	Pieter van den Hoogenband	Netherlands	47.75	
6	1	Lyndon Ferns	South Africa	48.04	
7	6	Matt Targett	Australia	48.20	
8	2	Stefan Nystrand	Sweden	48.33	
