= Swimming at the 2012 European Aquatics Championships – Men's 100 metre freestyle =

Men's 100 metre freestyle at the 2012 European Aquatics Championships
- Dates: May 24, 2012 (heats and semifinals); May 25, 2012 (final)
- Competitors: 59 from 31 nations
- Winning time: 48.77

Medalists
| gold medal | Filippo Magnini | Italy |
| silver medal | Alain Bernard | France |
| bronze medal | Norbert Trandafir | Romania |

The men's 100 metre freestyle competition of the swimming events at the 2012 European Aquatics Championships took place May 24 and 25. The heats and semifinals took place on May 24, the final on May 25.

== Records ==
Prior to the competition, the existing world, European and championship records were as follows.

| | Name | Nation | Time | Location | Date |
|---|---|---|---|---|---|
| World record | César Cielo | Brazil | 46.91 | Rome | July 30, 2009 |
| European record | Alain Bernard | France | 47.12 | Rome | July 30, 2009 |
| Championship record | Alain Bernard | France | 47.50 | Eindhoven | March 22, 2008 |

== Results ==
=== Heats ===
66 swimmers participated in 9 heats.

| Rank | Heat | Lane | Name | Nationality | Time | Notes |
|---|---|---|---|---|---|---|
| 1 | 9 | 5 | Amaury Leveaux | France | 48.77 | Q |
| 2 | 9 | 4 | Marco di Carli | Germany | 48.81 | Q |
| 3 | 7 | 2 | Norbert Trandafir | Romania | 49.09 | Q |
| 4 | 9 | 2 | Dieter Dekoninck | Belgium | 49.12 | Q |
| 5 | 8 | 4 | Filippo Magnini | Italy | 49.24 | Q |
| 6 | 7 | 4 | Alain Bernard | France | 49.31 | Q |
| 7 | 9 | 1 | Dominik Kozma | Hungary | 49.37 | Q |
| 8 | 7 | 5 | Pieter Timmers | Belgium | 49.38 | Q |
| 9 | 9 | 8 | Jasper Aerents | Belgium | 49.39 | |
| 10 | 9 | 7 | Oleg Tikhobaev | Russia | 49.51 | Q |
| 11 | 8 | 7 | Emmanuel Vanluchene | Belgium | 49.56 | |
| 12 | 6 | 1 | Yauhen Tsurkin | Belarus | 49.62 | NR |
| 13 | 8 | 3 | Steffen Deibler | Germany | 49.63 | Q |
| 14 | 6 | 6 | Kemal Arda Gürdal | Turkey | 49.64 | Q, NR |
| 15 | 7 | 3 | Michele Santucci | Italy | 49.66 | Q |
| 16 | 6 | 4 | Mindaugas Sadauskas | Lithuania | 49.74 | Q |
| 17 | 8 | 2 | Vitaly Syrnikov | Russia | 49.75 | Q |
| 18 | 8 | 1 | Martin Verner | Czech Republic | 49.83 | Q |
| 19 | 8 | 5 | Stefan Nystrand | Sweden | 49.87 | Q |
| 20 | 3 | 3 | Kristian Golomeev | Greece | 49.89 | |
| 21 | 9 | 6 | Christoph Fildebrandt | Germany | 49.92 | |
| 22 | 6 | 5 | Petter Stymne | Sweden | 49.99 | |
| 22 | 7 | 8 | Krisztián Takács | Hungary | 49.99 | |
| 24 | 8 | 6 | Andrea Rolla | Italy | 50.13 | |
| 25 | 6 | 8 | Tiago Andre Venancio | Portugal | 50.16 | |
| 26 | 5 | 5 | Uvis Kalnins | Latvia | 50.23 | |
| 27 | 5 | 1 | Lars Frölander | Sweden | 50.31 | |
| 28 | 3 | 1 | Filip Wypych | Poland | 50.35 | |
| 29 | 6 | 7 | Peter Mankoč | Slovenia | 50.36 | |
| 30 | 7 | 7 | Craig Gibbons | Great Britain | 50.49 | |
| 31 | 6 | 3 | Arseni Kukharau | Belarus | 50.52 | |
| 32 | 4 | 1 | Pjotr Degtjarjov | Estonia | 50.55 | |
| 33 | 4 | 5 | Ari-Pekka Liukkonen | Finland | 50.62 | |
| 34 | 4 | 6 | Radovan Siljevski | Serbia | 50.67 | |
| 35 | 3 | 7 | Viacheslav Andrusenko | Russia | 50.69 | |
| 35 | 4 | 7 | Martin Spitzer | Austria | 50.69 | |
| 37 | 3 | 6 | Ivan Levaj | Croatia | 50.85 | |
| 37 | 5 | 8 | Aurelien Künzi | Switzerland | 50.85 | |
| 39 | 3 | 2 | Gard Kvale | Norway | 50.89 | |
| 40 | 5 | 7 | Daniel Rast | Switzerland | 50.91 | |
| 41 | 1 | 4 | Fotios Koliopoulos | Greece | 50.92 | |
| 42 | 3 | 8 | Radoslaw Bor | Poland | 51.09 | |
| 43 | 5 | 6 | Pawel Werner | Poland | 51.10 | |
| 44 | 2 | 1 | Evgheni Coroliuc | Moldova | 51.14 | |
| 45 | 3 | 4 | Árni Már Árnason | Iceland | 51.18 | |
| 46 | 3 | 5 | Boris Stojanović | Serbia | 51.19 | |
| 47 | 4 | 2 | Simonas Bilis | Lithuania | 51.21 | |
| 48 | 5 | 4 | Alexandre Escudier Agostinho | Portugal | 51.27 | |
| 49 | 5 | 2 | Ioannis Kalargaris | Greece | 51.44 | |
| 50 | 4 | 3 | Mario Alexandre Pereira | Portugal | 51.58 | |
| 51 | 2 | 4 | Christian Scherübl | Austria | 51.59 | |
| 52 | 4 | 8 | Luis Emanuel Vaz | Portugal | 51.74 | |
| 53 | 2 | 3 | Balázs Zámbó | Hungary | 52.51 | |
| 54 | 2 | 5 | Tadas Duškinas | Lithuania | 52.60 | |
| 55 | 2 | 6 | Irakli Revishvili | Georgia | 52.97 | |
| 56 | 2 | 7 | Ole Martin Ree | Norway | 53.08 | |
| 57 | 1 | 5 | Tal Hanani | Israel | 53.32 | |
| 58 | 1 | 3 | Hedin Olsen | Faroe Islands | 53.37 | NR |
| 59 | 2 | 2 | Aleksandar Nikolov | Bulgaria | 53.55 | |
| | 4 | 4 | Mattias Carlsson | Sweden | DNS | |
| | 5 | 3 | Andriy Govorov | Ukraine | DNS | |
| | 6 | 2 | Nimrod Shapira Bar-Or | Israel | DNS | |
| | 7 | 1 | Dominik Meichtry | Switzerland | DNS | |
| | 7 | 6 | Marco Orsi | Italy | DNS | |
| | 8 | 8 | Flori Lang | Switzerland | DNS | |
| | 9 | 3 | Markus Deibler | Germany | DNS | |

=== Semifinals ===
The eight fastest swimmers advanced to the final.

==== Semifinal 1 ====
| Rank | Lane | Name | Nationality | Time | Notes |
|---|---|---|---|---|---|
| 1 | 4 | Marco di Carli | Germany | 48.96 | Q |
| 2 | 5 | Dieter Dekoninck | Belgium | 49.19 | Q |
| 3 | 6 | Pieter Timmers | Belgium | 49.21 | Q |
| 4 | 3 | Alain Bernard | France | 49.27 | Q |
| 5 | 7 | Michele Santucci | Italy | 49.47 | |
| 5 | 8 | Stefan Nystrand | Sweden | 49.47 | |
| 7 | 2 | Steffen Deibler | Germany | 49.54 | |
| 8 | 1 | Vitaly Syrnikov | Russia | 49.56 | |

==== Semifinal 2 ====
| Rank | Lane | Name | Nationality | Time | Notes |
|---|---|---|---|---|---|
| 1 | 4 | Amaury Leveaux | France | 48.52 | Q |
| 2 | 3 | Filippo Magnini | Italy | 48.84 | Q |
| 3 | 5 | Norbert Trandafir | Romania | 49.08 | Q |
| 4 | 6 | Dominik Kozma | Hungary | 49.45 | Q |
| 5 | 2 | Oleg Tikhobaev | Russia | 49.61 | |
| 6 | 7 | Kemal Arda Gürdal | Turkey | 49.66 | |
| 7 | 1 | Mindaugas Sadauskas | Lithuania | 49.86 | |
| 8 | 8 | Martin Verner | Czech Republic | 50.03 | |

=== Final ===
The final was held at 17:42.

| Rank | Lane | Name | Nationality | Time | Notes |
|---|---|---|---|---|---|
| 1st place, gold medalist(s) | 5 | Filippo Magnini | Italy | 48.77 | |
| 2nd place, silver medalist(s) | 1 | Alain Bernard | France | 48.95 | |
| 3rd place, bronze medalist(s) | 6 | Norbert Trandafir | Romania | 49.13 | |
| 4 | 4 | Amaury Leveaux | France | 49.16 | |
| 5 | 8 | Dominik Kozma | Hungary | 49.17 | |
| 6 | 3 | Marco di Carli | Germany | 49.18 | |
| 7 | 7 | Pieter Timmers | Belgium | 49.19 | |
| 8 | 2 | Dieter Dekoninck | Belgium | 49.42 | |
