= Frédérick Bousquet =

French swimmer (born 1981)

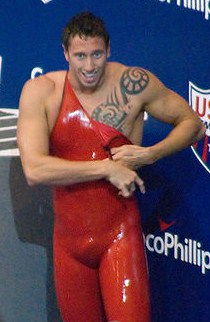
- Bousquet during the 2009 US Nationals.

Personal information
- Nationality: France
- Born: 8 April 1981 (age 45) Perpignan, France
- Height: 1.88 m (6 ft 2 in)
- Weight: 86 kg (190 lb; 13.5 st)

Sport
- Sport: Swimming
- Strokes: Butterfly, freestyle
- Club: CN Marseille
- College team: Auburn Tigers (2001–2005)
Medal record
Men's swimming
Representing France
Olympic Games
Silver medal – second place	2008 Beijing	4×100 m freestyle
World Championships (LC)
Silver medal – second place	2009 Rome	50 m freestyle
Bronze medal – third place	2003 Barcelona	4×100 m freestyle
Bronze medal – third place	2007 Melbourne	4×100 m freestyle
Bronze medal – third place	2009 Rome	100 m freestyle
Bronze medal – third place	2009 Rome	4×100 m freestyle
Bronze medal – third place	2013 Barcelona	50 m butterfly
World Championships (SC)
Gold medal – first place	2010 Dubai	4×100 m freestyle
Silver medal – second place	2010 Dubai	50 m freestyle
European Championships (LC)
Gold medal – first place	2010 Budapest	50 m freestyle
Gold medal – first place	2010 Budapest	4×100 m medley
Gold medal – first place	2012 Debrecen	50 m freestyle
Gold medal – first place	2012 Debrecen	4×100 m freestyle
Silver medal – second place	2010 Budapest	50 m butterfly
Silver medal – second place	2012 Debrecen	50 m butterfly
Bronze medal – third place	2000 Helsinki	4×100 m freestyle
Bronze medal – third place	2006 Budapest	4×100 m freestyle
European Championships (SC)
Gold medal – first place	2004 Vienna	100 m freestyle
Gold medal – first place	2004 Vienna	4×50 m freestyle
Gold medal – first place	2008 Rijeka	4×50 m freestyle
Gold medal – first place	2009 Istanbul	50 m freestyle
Gold medal – first place	2009 Istanbul	4×50 m freestyle
Gold medal – first place	2012 Chartres	4×50 m freestyle
Gold medal – first place	2012 Chartres	4×50 m medley
Gold medal – first place	2012 Chartres	4×50 m mixed free
Gold medal – first place	2012 Chartres	4×50 m mixed medley
Silver medal – second place	2005 Trieste	50 m freestyle
Silver medal – second place	2005 Trieste	4×50 m freestyle
Silver medal – second place	2006 Helsinki	4×50 m freestyle
Silver medal – second place	2008 Rijeka	50 m freestyle
Silver medal – second place	2009 Istanbul	50 m butterfly
Silver medal – second place	2012 Chartres	50 m butterfly
Bronze medal – third place	2009 Istanbul	4×50 m medley
Bronze medal – third place	2012 Chartres	50 m freestyle
Mediterranean Games
Gold medal – first place	2005 Almería	50 m butterfly
Gold medal – first place	2005 Almería	4×100 m freestyle
Gold medal – first place	2009 Pescara	50 m freestyle
Gold medal – first place	2009 Pescara	4×100 m freestyle

Frédérick Bousquet (French pronunciation: [fʁe.de.ʁik bu.skɛ], born 8 April 1981 in Perpignan) is a retired freestyle and butterfly swimmer from France. He won a silver medal at the 2008 Olympics and formerly held the world record in the 50 m freestyle.

Bousquet represented Auburn University, contributing to 3 NCAA team titles in his collegiate career. During his time at Auburn, he broke the world record in the short course metres 50 m freestyle, and the US Open record in the 50 yd freestyle.

Bousquet won a silver medal at the 2008 Olympics as part of the French 4 × 100 m freestyle relay team. In 2009, he broke the world record in the long course 50 m freestyle and won 3 medals at the World Championships.

In 2010, Bousquet received a 2-month suspension after testing positive for heptaminol.

== Career ==
=== 2003 ===
In Bousquet's sophomore year, he qualified for the 2003 NCAA Championships. In the 200 yd freestyle relay, he swam the anchor leg, splitting 18.78 to miss the title by 0.25 seconds. The same night, he won the 50 yd freestyle in a time of 19.31. In the 400 yd medley relay, he swam the freestyle leg, splitting 42.18. Auburn finished third in a time of 3:07.28. In the 200 yd medley relay, Bousquet swam the third leg, contributely a time of 20.21 to record the fastest butterfly split in the field. Auburn finished second in a time of 1:24.96. In his second individual event of the championships, Bousquet came seventh in the 100 yd butterfly, recording a time of 46.75. On the final day of competition, Bousquet went 42.69 in the 100 yd freestyle, finishing third. He swam in the final event of the program, the 400 yd freestyle relay, splitting 41.47 on the anchor leg. Auburn finished second with a time of 2:49.68. Auburn won the team title with 603.5 points, 196.5 points ahead of second place.

In July 2003, Bousquet competed at the 2003 World Championships in Barcelona. In the 4 × 100 m freestyle relay, he swam the anchor leg in 47.03, recording the second-fastest relay split in history (as of 21 July 2003). He overtook Ian Thorpe to win the bronze medal in a time of 3:15.66, 0.01 seconds ahead of Australia. Later in the competition, Bousquet finished sixth in the 100 m freestyle in a time of 49.30 seconds. In the 50 m freestyle, he finished tenth in the semifinals with a time of 22.47, missing the final by 0.02 seconds.

=== 2004 ===
Bousquet qualified for the 2004 NCAA Championships. The NCAA decided to host the year's competition in short course metres, rather than their traditional format of short course yards. This created the possibility for world records at the championships.

Bousquet competed in the 200 m freestyle relay, splitting 20.55 on the anchor leg, which was the fastest split in the field. Auburn won the event in a US Open record of 1:23.75. In the 50 m freestyle, Bousquet won the title in 21.10, breaking Anthony Ervin's world record of 21.21 from 2000. In the 400 m medley relay, Bousquet swam the butterfly leg and split 51.09. Auburn record a final time of 3:27.19 to finish second. Bousquet then swam the 200 m medley relay. He split 22.73 on the butterfly leg, contributing to a title in the event. Auburn's overall time was 1:34.25, another US Open record. In the 100 m butterfly, Bousquet finished sixth in a time of 52.11. On the final day, he finished third in the 100 m freestyle with a time of 46.87. He swam the anchor leg of the 400 m freestyle relay, splitting 47.12. Auburn won the event in 3:08.85, a new US Open record. Like in 2003, Auburn won the team title.

At the 2004 Olympics in Athens, Bousquet swam the anchor leg of the 4 × 100 m freestyle relay. He split 48.32, contributing to an overall time of 3:16.23 that placed France seventh.

=== 2005 ===
Bousquet competed at the 2005 NCAA Championships in his senior year. The championships returned to the short course yards format.

In the 50 yd freestyle heats, Bousquet went 18.78 to break the US Open record of 19.05, jointly held by Tom Jager and Anthony Ervin, becoming the first person to break 19-seconds in the event. That evening, Bousquet competed in the 200 yd freestyle relay and split 18.64 on the third leg. Auburn finished second, losing their US Open record to California. Bousquet then competed in the 50 yd freestyle final. Although he was slower than his record from the heats, he managed to break 19 seconds again to win the title in 18.90 seconds. He swam the butterfly leg of the 400 yd medley relay, contributing a split of 46.05 to help Auburn finish third; their final time was 3:07.92. In the 200 yd medley relay, Bousquet split 18.55 on the anchor leg, contributing to a fourth-place finish by Auburn in a final time of 1:25.79. In the 100 yd butterfly, Bousquet came fifth in a time of 46.90. On the final day, Bousquet finished second in the 100 yd freestyle in a time of 42.19. In the final race of his collegiate career, Bousquet led off the 400 yd freestyle relay in a time of 41.87. Auburn finished second in the event with a time of 2:50.38. Auburn won the team title again.

Bousquet competed at the 2005 World Championships in Montreal. He recorded a time of 49.21 to finish ninth in the 100 m freestyle, missing the final by 0.02 seconds. He then competed in the 50 m freestyle, finishing seventh in a time of 22.44.

=== 2007 ===
Bousquet qualified for the 2007 World Championships in Melbourne. In the 4 × 100 m freestyle relay, Bousquet split 48.48 on the second leg. France ultimately won the bronze medal in a time of 3:14.68. Competing in the 100 m freestyle, Bousquet came twenty-seventh in a time of 49.94. His final event was the 50 m freestyle, where he recorded 22.50 to finish twelfth.

=== 2008 ===
At the 2008 French Championships in Dunkirk, Bousquet went 48.71 to finish third in the 100 m freestyle, qualifying for the 2008 Olympics in Beijing in the 4 × 100 m freestyle relay. France had four swimmers under the 49 second mark, including Alain Bernard as world record holder, making them contenders for the gold medal. France consolidated its gold contention at the Paris Open in June 2008, with a relay performance of 3:12.54, a new European record and 0.08 seconds slower than the US' world record from 2006.

In Beijing, France swam in the second heat of the 4 × 100 m freestyle relay. After the US broke the world record in the first heat, France recorded a time of 3:12.36, then the second-fastest time in history. Bousquet's anchor leg of 46.63 was the fastest the relay split in history. In the final, Bousquet swam the third leg, equalling his split from the heats to lead the race by a body-length. However, in the final 50 m of the race, French anchor Bernard was overtaken by the US' Jason Lezak, relegating France to the silver medal. Lezak also surpassed Bousquet's split. France's final time was 3:08.32, 0.08 seconds slower the US. The US and France were among five teams in the final that surpassed the world record from the heats.

=== 2009 ===
In April 2009, Bousquet competed at the 2009 French Championships in Montpellier. In the heats of the 50 m butterfly, he went 22.84 to break the French record before scratching for an unreported reason. He won the 100 m freestyle final in a time of 47.15, upsetting Bernard had who gone 46.94 in the semifinals. Bousquet's final event was the 50 m freestyle, which he won in a time of 20.94, breaking Eamon Sullivan's world record of 21.28 from 2008, and becoming the first person to break 21-seconds in the event. Bousquet's mark stood until December 2009.

Bousquet competed at the 2009 World Championships in Rome. France was hoping to avenge their Olympic loss in the 4 × 100 m freestyle relay with a world title in the event. However, the US won the gold medal again, with Russia winning silver. France was relegated to the bronze medal position. In the 100 m freestyle, Bousquet won the bronze medal in 47.25 seconds. In the 50 m freestyle, he set a championship record of 21.21 seconds in the second semifinal, which was broken by George Bovell in a swim-off for the finals. In the final, Bousquet equaled his time from the semifinals to win the silver medal.

=== 2010–2013 ===
In February 2010, Bousquet competed at the Auburn Masters Invitational in Phoenix, Arizona. Although FINA had banned high-tech suits effective 1 January 2010, that decision was not immediately adopted by USA Masters Swimming, who banned them effective 31 May 2010. Bousquet used a suit to go 18.67 in the 50 yd freestyle, establishing a new masters record.

At the 2010 European Championships in Budapest, Bousquet went 21.36 in the semifinals of the 50 m freestyle, which was a new championship record and the fastest time in a textile suit. In the final, he won the gold medal in a time of 21.49.

At the 2013 World Championships in Barcelona, Bousquet won the bronze medal in the 50 m butterfly, recording a time of 23.11 to finish 0.10 seconds behind the gold medalist.

== Doping suspension ==
Bousquet was given a two-month suspension in October 2010 after returning a positive test for heptaminol from the use of an over-the-counter ointment.

== Personal life ==
In April 2010, fellow world-class swimmer Laure Manaudou gave birth to her and Bousquet's daughter Manon. The couple has since separated.

== See also ==
- World record progression 50m freestyle

Records
Preceded by Mark Foster	Men's 50 metre freestyle world record holder (short course); 25 March 2004 – 12 August 2006	Succeeded by Roland Schoeman
Preceded by Eamon Sullivan	Men's 50 metre freestyle world record holder (long course); 26 April 2009 – 18 December 2009	Succeeded by César Cielo
