= Danil Haustov =

Estonian swimmer

Personal information
- Full name: Danil Haustov
- National team: Estonia
- Born: 13 December 1980 (age 45) Moscow, Russian SFSR, Soviet Union
- Height: 1.82 m (6 ft 0 in)
- Weight: 85 kg (187 lb)

Sport
- Sport: Swimming
- Strokes: Freestyle
- Club: Kohtla-Järve Water Sport (EST)
- Coach: Aleksandr Abel

Danil Haustov (born 13 December 1980) is an Estonian former swimmer, who specialized in sprint freestyle events. He set an Estonian record of 1:27.06, as a relay swimmer, in the 4×50 m freestyle at the 2008 European Short Course Swimming Championships in Rijeka, Croatia. Haustov is also a member of Kohtla-Järve Water Sport Club in Tallinn, and is coached and trained by Aleksandr Abel.

Haustov made his first Estonian team at the 2004 Summer Olympics in Athens. He qualified for two swimming events by attaining B-standard entry times of 23.08 (50 m freestyle) and 50.42 (100 m freestyle). In the 100 m freestyle, Haustov raced to sixth place on the fifth heat and thirty-fifth overall by 0.35 of a second behind Finland's Matti Rajakylä in a time of 51.02. In his second event, 50 m freestyle, Haustov set his personal best of 23.52 seconds, but rounded out the sixth heat to last place and forty-ninth overall by 0.02 of a second behind Chinese Taipei's Wang Shao-an.

At the 2008 Summer Olympics in Beijing, Haustov qualified for the second time in the 100 m freestyle by clearing a FINA B-cut of 50.37 from the 2008 European Aquatics Championships in Eindhoven, Netherlands. He challenged seven other swimmers on the fourth heat, including Kenya's Jason Dunford and Papua New Guinea's Ryan Pini, both of whom later reached the butterfly final. Haustov rounded out the field to last place by 0.18 of a second behind Romania's Norbert Trandafir in 50.92 seconds, just a tenth of a second off his time set in Athens. Haustov failed to advance into the semifinals, as he placed fifty-first out of 64 swimmers in the prelims.
