= Zachary Payne =

Cook Islands swimmer

Personal information
- Full name: Zachary Tepaia Payne
- Born: November 18, 1993 (age 32) Rarotonga, Cook Islands

Sport
- Sport: Swimming

Zachary Tepaia Payne (born 18 November 1993) is a swimmer from the Cook Islands and freestyle specialist. He competed in the 50 m event at the 2012 Summer Olympics. His middle name, Tepaia, means "strong zephyr" in Rarotongan, the most widely spoken Māori language on the islands.
