= Kaan Tayla =

Turkish swimmer

Personal information
- Nationality: TUR
- Born: February 17, 1986 (age 40) Istanbul, Turkey
- Height: 1.87 m (6 ft 2 in)
- Weight: 77 kg (170 lb)

Sport
- Sport: Swimming
- Strokes: Freestyle

Kaan Tayla (born February 17, 1986) is an olympic freestyle swimmer from Turkey. He graduated from VirginiaTech, USA.

Tayla represented Turkey in the 50m and 100m freestyle events at the 2004 Summer Olympics in Athens, Greece and the 2008 Summer Olympics in Beijing, China.

He is holder of the national record in the 50m freestyle event with 22.37 set on July 14, 2008 in Atlanta, Georgia, USA. He shares another national record in 4×50 m freestyle relay with 1:28.97 set at the 2009 European Short Course Swimming Championships held in Istanbul, Turkey.
