= Shane Mangroo =

Seychellois swimmer

Personal information
- Full name: Shane Christopher Mangroo
- Born: March 12, 1993 (age 33)

Sport
- Sport: Swimming

Shane Christopher Mangroo (born 12 March 1993) is a Seychellois swimmer. At the 2012 Summer Olympics, he competed in the Men's 100 metre freestyle, finishing in 50th place overall in the heats, failing to qualify for the semifinals.
