= Alain Bernard =

French swimmer (born 1983)

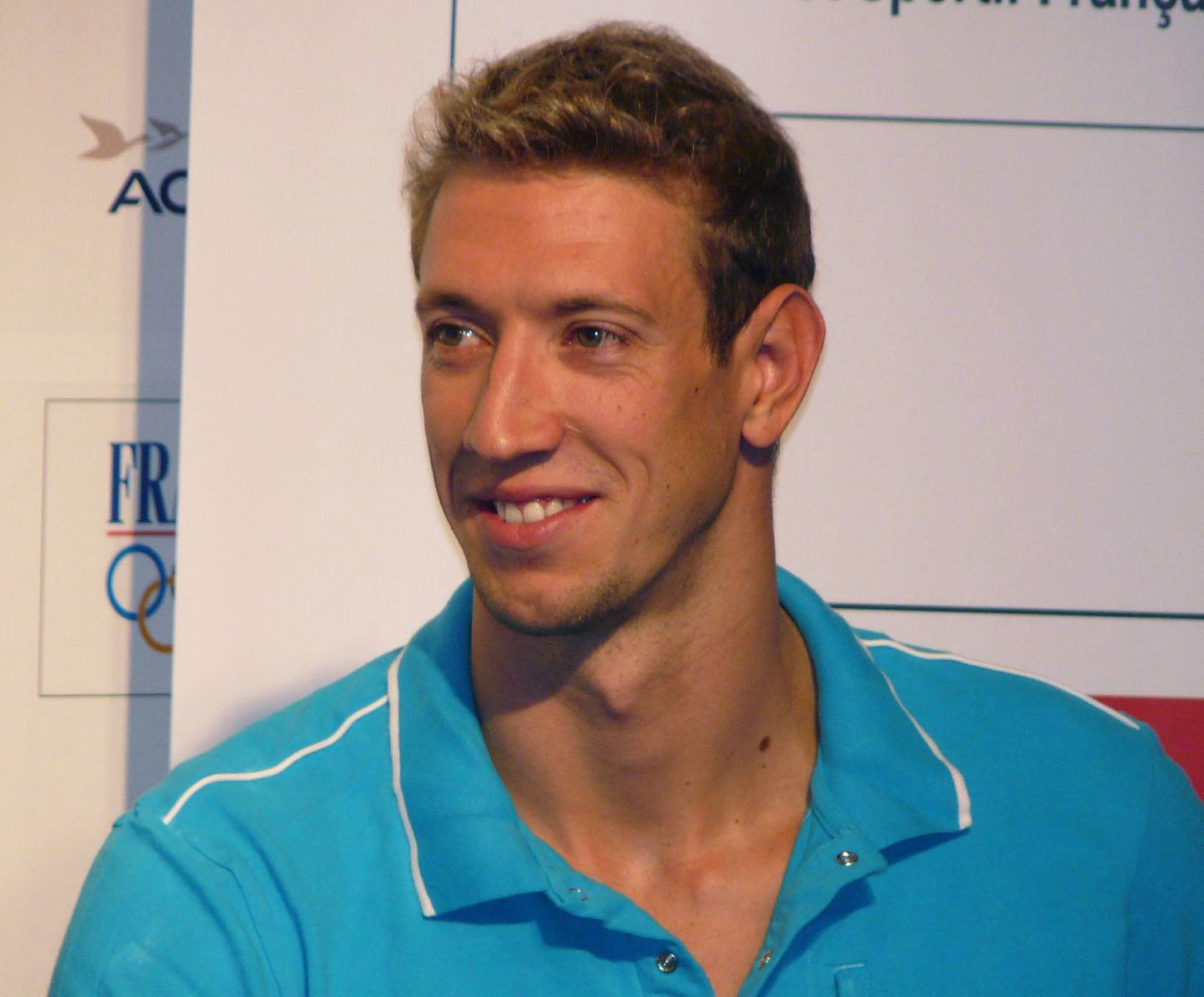

Personal information
- Nationality: France
- Born: 1 May 1983 (age 43) Aubagne, France
- Height: 1.96 m (6 ft 5 in)
- Weight: 90 kg (198 lb)
- Website: AlainBernard-lesite.com

Sport
- Sport: Swimming
- Strokes: Freestyle
- Club: CN Antibes
Medal record
Men's swimming
Representing France
| Event | 1st | 2nd | 3rd |
|---|---|---|---|
| Olympic Games | 2 | 1 | 1 |
| World Championships (LC) | 0 | 2 | 3 |
| World Championships (SC) | 1 | 0 | 0 |
| European Championships (LC) | 4 | 2 | 1 |
| European Championships (SC) | 3 | 3 | 2 |
| Universiade | 1 | 0 | 0 |
| Mediterranean Games | 3 | 1 | 0 |
| Total | 14 | 9 | 7 |
Olympic Games
| Gold medal – first place | 2008 Beijing | 100 m freestyle |
| Gold medal – first place | 2012 London | 4×100 m freestyle |
| Silver medal – second place | 2008 Beijing | 4×100 m freestyle |
| Bronze medal – third place | 2008 Beijing | 50 m freestyle |
World Championships (LC)
| Silver medal – second place | 2009 Rome | 100 m freestyle |
| Silver medal – second place | 2011 Shanghai | 4×100 m freestyle |
| Bronze medal – third place | 2007 Melbourne | 4×100 m freestyle |
| Bronze medal – third place | 2009 Rome | 4×100 m freestyle |
| Bronze medal – third place | 2011 Shanghai | 50 m freestyle |
World Championships (SC)
| Gold medal – first place | 2010 Dubai | 4×100 m freestyle |
European Championships (LC)
| Gold medal – first place | 2008 Eindhoven | 100 m freestyle |
| Gold medal – first place | 2008 Eindhoven | 50 m freestyle |
| Gold medal – first place | 2010 Budapest | 100 m freestyle |
| Gold medal – first place | 2012 Debrecen | 4×100 m freestyle |
| Silver medal – second place | 2010 Budapest | 4×100 m freestyle |
| Silver medal – second place | 2012 Debrecen | 100 m freestyle |
| Bronze medal – third place | 2006 Budapest | 4×100 m freestyle |
European Championships (SC)
| Gold medal – first place | 2004 Vienna | 4×50 m freestyle |
| Gold medal – first place | 2008 Rijeka | 4×50 m freestyle |
| Gold medal – first place | 2007 Debrecen | 100 m freestyle |
| Silver medal – second place | 2005 Trieste | 4×50 m freestyle |
| Silver medal – second place | 2006 Helsinki | 4×50 m freestyle |
| Silver medal – second place | 2007 Debrecen | 4×50 m freestyle |
| Bronze medal – third place | 2006 Helsinki | 100 m freestyle |
| Bronze medal – third place | 2007 Debrecen | 50 m freestyle |
Universiade
| Gold medal – first place | 2005 Izmir | 4×100 m freestyle |
Mediterranean Games
| Gold medal – first place | 2005 Almería | 4×100 m freestyle |
| Gold medal – first place | 2009 Pescara | 100 m freestyle |
| Gold medal – first place | 2009 Pescara | 4×100 m freestyle |
| Silver medal – second place | 2009 Pescara | 50 m freestyle |

Alain Bernard (French pronunciation: [alɛ̃ bɛʁnaʁ]; born 1 May 1983) is a French former swimmer from Aubagne, Bouches-du-Rhône.

Bernard won a total of four medals (two golds, one silver, and one bronze) at two Olympic Games (2008 and 2012). He also won numerous medals at the World Championships (short course and long course) and European Championships (short course and long course). Bernard formerly held the world record for the 50 metres freestyle (long course) and the 100 metres freestyle (long course and short course).

Bernard has a shark tattoo on his right hip.

== 2008 European (Long Course) Championships ==
Bernard won the European (Long Course) Championships 2008 100 m freestyle final in a new world record time of 47.50 seconds on 22 March 2008. He had already beaten the world record the previous day, finishing in 47.60 seconds in the semi-finals. On 23 March 2008 Bernard broke Eamon Sullivan's 50 m freestyle world record in the semi-finals of the same championships, setting a new world record of 21.50 seconds. Bernard would go on to win the 50m freestyle final in 21.66 seconds. But Bernard's 21.50-second world record only stood for four days; it was reclaimed by Eamon Sullivan, with a 21.41 effort.

== 2008 Olympics ==
At the French national championships, Bernard qualified for the Olympic Games in Beijing in the 50 m freestyle (with a time of 21.69 s) and 100 m freestyle (47.82 s).

Before the 4×100 m freestyle relay, Bernard taunted the American swim team. Bernard claimed to a newspaper that he and his French teammates, favorite to win the relay, "were going to smash the American team. That's what we came here for". But the French team ended up in second place behind the American team by .08 seconds. Bernard, who had a lead going into the final leg of slightly less than a body length, was caught in the final strokes by Jason Lezak, whose final leg of 46.06 seconds was the fastest relay leg in history.

The close defeat left Bernard "wounded," according to his coach. However, he rebounded to win the men's 100 metres freestyle gold medal. Bernard had one day earlier set a new 100 metres freestyle long course world record of 47.20 s in the semi-finals. Bernard became only the second Frenchman to win an Olympic gold medal in swimming, after Jean Boiteux, who won the 400 m freestyle at the 1952 Helsinki Games. He also finished third in the men's 50 metres freestyle final behind César Cielo Filho of Brazil and Amaury Leveaux of France, making it the first time in Olympic history that France had produced two medallists in a swimming final.

== 2012 Olympics ==
Bernard failed to qualify for the 50 m freestyle and 100 m freestyle events of the 2012 Summer Olympics in London by finishing only fifth in both events during the French swimming championships in March 2012. He was in the French 4 × 100 m freestyle relay team in the heats at the Olympics, but was not included in the team for the final. France won the event which made Bernard a two-time Olympic gold medalist.

He announced his retirement from swimming shortly after the 2012 Olympic Games.

== Awards ==
Bernard was chosen as the 2008 L'Équipe Champion of Champions(France category) by L'Équipe.

He was also chosen as the 2008 RTL Champion of Champions by RTL, a French commercial radio network. This annual sports award was inaugurated in 2008.

On 1 January 2013, Bernard was made an Officer (Officier) of the French National Order of Merit.

== Personal bests ==
Personal bests
| Event | Long course | Short course |
|---|---|---|
| 50 m freestyle | 21.23 | 20.64 |
| 100 m freestyle | 46.94 | 45.69 |
| 200 m freestyle | 1:47.81 | 1:46.43 |

The 100m long course time (46.94) was not admissible as a world record because it was swum in a non-approved swimsuit.

== Service in the French Gendarmerie ==
Alain Bernard has been a volunteer in the Gendarmerie since 2008 and was until recently attached to the Groupement blindé de gendarmerie mobile based in Versailles-Satory in the Yvelines department.

== See also ==
- World record progression 50 metres freestyle
- World record progression 100 metres freestyle

Records
| Preceded by Eamon Sullivan | Men's 50 metre freestyle world record holder (long course); 23 March 2008 – 27 March 2008 | Succeeded by Eamon Sullivan |
| Preceded by Pieter van den Hoogenband; Eamon Sullivan; Eamon Sullivan | Men's 100 metre freestyle world record holder (long course); 21 March 2008 – 11 August 2008; 13 August 2008; 23 April 2009 – 22 June 2009 (record annulled) | Succeeded by Eamon Sullivan; Eamon Sullivan; Eamon Sullivan |
| Preceded by Stefan Nystrand | Men's 100 metres freestyle world record holder (short course); 7 December 2008 – 12 December 2008 | Succeeded by Amaury Leveaux |
Awards
| Preceded by Mateusz Sawrymowicz | European Swimmer of the Year; 2008 | Succeeded by Paul Biedermann |
| Preceded by Sébastien Loeb; Daniel Elena | French Sportsperson of the Year; 2008 | Succeeded by Sébastien Loeb; Daniel Elena |
