= Andrejs Dūda =

Latvian swimmer (born 1981)

Andrejs Duda
Personal information
- National team: Latvia
- Born: 30 October 1981 (age 44) Jelgava, Latvia, Soviet Union

Sport
- Sport: Swimming
- Strokes: Backstroke, Freestyle, Butterfly
- College team: Kenyon College

Andrejs Dūda (born 30 October 1981) is a Latvian swimmer, is a two-time Olympian and nine-time NCAA DIII national individual champion in swimming. Duda represented Latvia at the 2004 Summer Olympics in Athens, Greece, and has qualified to compete in the 2008 Summer Olympics. He graduated from Kenyon College in Gambier, Ohio, in 2006 where he was a member of four national championship swimming teams and set a college record with 24 NCAA national event titles.

Duda competed in the 200-meter individual medley and the 100-meter butterfly at the 2008 Summer Olympics in Beijing, China.
