= Mohamed Coulibaly (swimmer) =

Malian swimmer

Personal information
- Born: September 19, 1989 (age 36)

Sport
- Sport: Swimming

Mohamed Coulibaly (born September 19, 1989) is a Malian swimmer, who specialized in sprint freestyle events. He represented Mali at the 2008 Summer Olympics in Beijing, and competed in the men's 50 m freestyle event. Coulibaly swam in the third heat of the competition, with a time of 29.09 seconds, finishing in fifth place, and eighty-sixth in the overall standings.
