= Joel Greenshields =

Canadian swimmer (born 1988)

Personal information
- Full name: Joel Greenshields
- National team: Canada
- Born: April 18, 1988 (age 38) Edson, Alberta
- Height: 1.93 m (6 ft 4 in)
- Weight: 80 kg (176 lb)

Sport
- Sport: Swimming
- Strokes: Freestyle
- Club: Pacific Dolphins
- College team: University of Arizona

Joel Greenshields (born April 14, 1988) is a Canadian competition swimmer. Born in Edson, Alberta, he competes in the 100-metre freestyle.

At the 2008 Summer Olympics in Beijing, he was a member of the Canadian team that finished sixth in the 4x100-metre freestyle relay event. The team had previously finished in seventh at the 2007 World Aquatics Championships.

== See also ==
- World record progression 4 × 200 metres freestyle relay
