= Edward Caruana Dingli (swimmer) =

Maltese swimmer

Personal information
- Full name: Edward Caruana Dingli
- Nationality: Maltese
- Born: April 24, 1992 (age 34) Pietà, Malta
- Height: 1.985 m (6 ft 6.1 in)
- Weight: 100 kg (220 lb)

Sport
- Sport: Swimming
- Strokes: Freestyle, Individual Medley
- Club: Neptunes WPSC, Exiles S.C.

Edward Caruana Dingli (born April 24, 1992) is a retired Maltese swimmer, holding the 400m freestyle (LCM) and the 200m and 400m individual medley (LCM) national record and both the LCM and the SCM relay national record in the 4x200m Freestyle. He retired from competitive swimming after competing at the 2015 Summer Universiade.

== Personal life ==
He is the son of Joseph Caruana Dingli, former national goalkeeper and captain of the Malta men's national water polo team.

Caruana Dingli graduated as a lawyer from the University of Malta. During his studies he also form part of the Malta University Sports Club, and was the inaugural Secretary General of the University of Malta Students' Futsal Team.
