= Roberto Gómez (swimmer) =

Venezuelan swimmer (born 1988)

Personal information
- Full name: Roberto Adolfo Gómez
- Nationality: Venezuela
- Born: May 5, 1988 (age 38) Venezuela
- Height: 1.85 m (6 ft 1 in)
- Weight: 70 kg (154 lb)

Sport
- Sport: Swimming
- Strokes: Freestyle
Medal record
Pan American Games
Bronze medal – third place	2011 Guadalajara	4x100m freestyle relay
Central American and Caribbean Games
Gold medal – first place	2010 Mayaguez	4x100m freestyle relay
Bronze medal – third place	2010 Mayaguez	50m freestyle
South American Games
Bronze medal – third place	2014 Santiago	4x100 m freestyle
Bronze medal – third place	2014 Santiago	4x100 m medley

Roberto Adolfo Gómez (born 5 May 1988) is a Venezuelan swimmer.
