= Ioannis Kalargaris =

Greek swimmer (born 1990)

Personal information
- Born: June 6, 1990 (age 36) Athens, Greece

Sport
- Sport: Swimming
Medal record
Representing Greece
Mediterranean Games
Silver medal – second place	2009 Pescara	4x100m medley relay
Bronze medal – third place	2009 Pescara	4x100m freestyle relay

Ioannis Kalargaris (Greek: Ιωαννης Καλαργαρης; born 6 June 1990) is a Greek swimmer specializing in freestyle. He competed in the 50 m event at the 2012 Summer Olympics.
