= Mohammad Madwa =

Kuwaiti swimmer

Personal information
- Full name: Mohammad Ahmed Madwa
- National team: Kuwait
- Born: 10 February 1987 (age 39) Kuwait City, Kuwait
- Height: 1.88 m (6 ft 2 in)
- Weight: 80 kg (176 lb)

Sport
- Sport: Swimming
- Strokes: Freestyle
- College team: Arizona State University (U.S.)
- Coach: Dorsey Tierney-Walker (U.S.)

Mohammad Ahmed Madwa (Arabic: محمد أحمد مدوه; born February 10, 1987) is a Kuwaiti freestyle swimmer. He represented his nation Kuwait at the 2008 Summer Olympics, and also served as a varsity swimmer for the Arizona State Sun Devils under head coach Dorsey Tierney-Walker, while pursuing his major in interdisciplinary studies at the Arizona State University in Phoenix, Arizona.

Madwa became the first ever Kuwaiti swimmer to qualify for the 2008 Summer Olympics in Beijing within the Olympic cut, competing in the men's 50 m freestyle. He finished under the FINA B-cut (23.12) by exactly a tenth of a second with a blistering 23.02 at the Asian Age Group Championships one year earlier in Jakarta, Indonesia. Swimming on the outside in heat eight of the prelims, Madwa smashed the 23-second barrier to take the fourth spot in a personal best of 22.83, but sharing a forty-fifth place tie with two-time Olympian Jevon Atkinson would not be enough to put him further to the semifinals.
