= Andreý Molçanow =

Turkmenistani swimmer

Andrey Molchanov
Personal information
- Nationality: Turkmenistan
- Born: 16 July 1987 (age 38)
- Height: 1.85 m (6 ft 1 in)

Sport
- Sport: Swimming

Andrey Molchanov (born 16 July 1987) is an Olympic swimmer from Turkmenistan. He competed at the 2008 Olympics, where he finished 64th in the 50m freestyle.

He also swam at the 2007 World Championships.
