= Petr Romashkin =

Uzbekistani swimmer (born 1989)

Personal information
- Full name: Petr Romashkin
- National team: Uzbekistan
- Born: 5 July 1989 (age 37) Tashkent, Uzbek SSR, Soviet Union
- Height: 1.85 m (6 ft 1 in)
- Weight: 70 kg (154 lb)

Sport
- Sport: Swimming
- Strokes: Freestyle

Petr Romashkin (Uzbek: Пётр Ромашкин; born July 5, 1989) is an Uzbek swimmer, who specializes in sprint freestyle events. He was selected to compete for the Uzbek swimming squad at the 2008 Summer Olympics, placing himself in the top 60 of the men's 100 m freestyle.

Romashkin qualified for the men's 100 m freestyle at the 2008 Summer Olympics in Beijing by clearing a FINA B-standard entry time of 50.92 from the Russian Open Swimming Championships in Saint Petersburg. He challenged seven other swimmers on the third heat, including 16-year-olds Virdhawal Khade of India and Christopher Duenas of Guam. Romashkin raced to sixth place by three hundredths of a second (0.03) behind South Korea's Lim Nam-Gyun in a time of 51.83 seconds. Romashkin failed to advance into the semifinals, as he placed fifty-fifth out of 64 swimmers in the preliminary heats.
