= Mikael Koloyan =

Armenian swimmer

Personal information
- Full name: Mikael Koloyan
- Nationality: Armenia
- Born: June 21, 1983 (age 43) Yerevan, Armenian SSR

Sport
- Sport: Swimming
- Strokes: Freestyle

Mikael Koloyan (Armenian: Դիմիտրի Մարգարյան; born June 21, 1983, in Yerevan, Armenian SSR) is an Armenian swimmer. He competed at the 2008 Summer Olympics in the men's 100 metre freestyle. Koloyan finished in 56th place overall in the heats. He competed at the 2012 Summer Olympics in the men's 100 metre freestyle. Koloyan finished in 45th place overall in the heats.
