= Vladimir Sidorkin =

Estonian swimmer

Personal information
- Full name: Vladimir Sidorkin
- National team: Estonia
- Born: 9 May 1986 (age 40) Kohtla-Järve, then part of Estonian SSR, Soviet Union
- Height: 1.95 m (6 ft 5 in)
- Weight: 87 kg (192 lb)

Sport
- Sport: Swimming
- Strokes: Freestyle
- Club: Kohtla-Järve Ujumisklubi Aktiiv
- College team: Drury University (U.S.)
- Coach: Brian Reynolds (U.S.)

Vladimir Sidorkin (born 9 May 1986) is an Estonian former swimmer, who specialized in both long and short course freestyle events. He represented his nation Estonia in middle-distance freestyle swimming at the 2008 Summer Olympics, and has currently owned a short-course Estonian record in the 100 m freestyle (47.99), set at the 2008 European Short Course Swimming Championships in Rijeka, Croatia.

Sidorkin competed for Estonia in the men's 200 m freestyle at the 2008 Summer Olympics in Beijing. He led the field with a solid 1:52.12 to register under the FINA B-cut (1:52.53) by about four tenths of a second at the Estonian Invitational Championships three months earlier in Tartu. Sidorkin put up a marvelous swim in heat two with a monstrous 1:51.27 to blast both a 26-year-old Estonian record and a sub-1:52 threshold for the runner-up spot, falling behind the winner Bryan Tay of Singapore by almost a full second. Sidorkin's record-breaking feat was not enough to put him through to the semifinals, finishing forty-fifth overall out of 58 swimmers in the prelims.

A graduate of accounting and business administration at Drury University in Springfield, Missouri, Sidorkin was a varsity member of the Drury Panthers swimming and diving team under head coach Brian Reynolds. While swimming for the Panthers, Sidorkin helped his college teammates claim their ninth consecutive title in the men's freestyle relay at the 2013 NCAA Division II Swimming Championships.

== See also ==
- List of Estonian records in swimming
