= Alexandre Agostinho =

Portuguese swimmer

Personal information
- Full name: Alexandre Escudier Agostinho
- Nationality: Portuguese, French
- Born: September 18, 1986 (age 40) Tarbes, France
- Height: 1.90 m (6 ft 3 in)
- Weight: 84 kg (185 lb)

Sport
- Sport: Swimming
- Club: Portinado - Associação de Natação de Portimão

Alexandre Escudier Agostinho (born September 18, 1986) is a former freestyle swimmer from Portugal, who represented his home country in several European and World Championships. He was also the Portuguese record holder in both 50m and 100m freestyle (long and short course pool) for more than 10 years.

He represented and trained at Portinado - Associação de Natação de Portimão since he was eight years old.

After finishing his swimming career, he became president of the Algarve Swimming Association from 2016 to 2020.

Agostinho has both Portuguese and French nationality. He was born in Tarbes (France). His father is Portuguese and his mother is French. He currently lives in Vienna, Austria and is fluent in 5 languages (French, Portuguese, English, German and Spanish).
