= Nimrod Shapira Bar-Or =

Israeli swimmer

Nimrod Shapira נמרוד שפירא בר אור
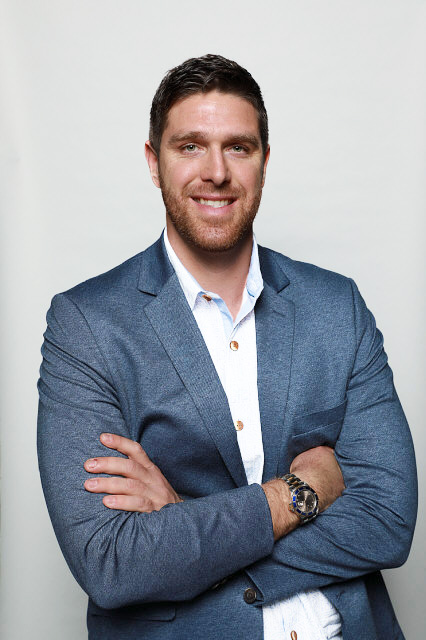
- Nimrod Shapira in 2012

Personal information
- Full name: Nimrod Shapira
- National team: Israel
- Born: April 25, 1989 (age 37) Jerusalem, Israel
- Height: 1.93 m (6 ft 4 in)
- Weight: 210 lb (95 kg)

Sport
- Sport: Swimming
- Strokes: Freestyle
- College team: University of Arizona
Medal record
Men's swimming
Representing Israel
Maccabiah Games
Silver medal – second place	2009 Israel	100m Freestyle
European Junior Championships
Silver medal – second place	2007 Antwerp	200m Freestyle
Bronze medal – third place	2007 Antwerp	400m Freestyle

Nimrod Shapira (Hebrew: נמרוד שפירא בר אור; born April 25, 1989) is an Israeli two-time Olympic swimmer, having represented Israel at the 2008 Olympics in the 100 meter and 200 meter freestyle, and in the 200 m freestyle for Israel at the 2012 Summer Olympics.

He is a 27-time Israeli Champion in the 50, 100 and 200 Freestyle events as well as 100 & 200 Butterfly. He won a silver medal in the 200 meter freestyle, and a bronze medal in the 400 meter freestyle, at the 2007 European Junior Swimming Championships. He won a silver medal in the 100 meter freestyle at the 2009 Maccabiah Games.

In 2013, after swimming in his second Olympic games, Shapira founded a swim club and swim schools in Michigan called AquaSwimClub. His swim program grew to 7 locations in Michigan with over 800 swimmers.

In 2017, AquaSwimClub's 800 swimmers turned into Shapira's first brick and mortar location, AQUAfin Swim School in Jacksonville Florida and serves thousands of swimmers on weekly basis.

== Biography ==
Shapira hometown is Moshav Avigdor, South Israel. Although he played basketball for a top Israeli junior team, a knee injury that he suffered at 11 years of age led him to shift his focus to swimming.

Aged 7, Shapira almost drowned in a pool during a birthday party and was saved by his uncle. This incident led his parents to get him and his sister into swimming lessons at their local pool.

Aged 11, Shapira got back in the pool for a swim practice and his passion to swimming began.

== Swimming career ==
=== European Junior Championships ===
In July 2007, he won a silver medal at the European Junior Swimming Championships in the 200 m freestyle (1.50.36), in Antwerp, Belgium. He also won a bronze medal in the 400 m freestyle (3:54.83).

=== High school ===
In November 2006, Shapira attended The Bolles School and he won the 200 yard freestyle (1:38.37) at the Florida State 1A Championships, and was runner-up in the 500 yard freestyle. He was named Times-Union 2006 Florida All-First Coast Swimmer of the Year.

=== Israeli national championships and records ===
Shapira is the only one in Israeli history to win all freestyle events within the same competition. In August 2007, he won a gold medal in the 400 m freestyle (3:55.23), and established the Israeli 18-and-under national record in the 200 m freestyle (1:50.06) at the Israeli Summer National Championships.

In March 2008, he swam on the team that set a new Israeli record in the 4×200 meter freestyle relay, at 7:20.87, at the 2008 European Championships in Eindhoven, Netherlands. In July 2008, he set a new Israeli record in the 200 meter freestyle, at 1:48.76 at the Croatian Open Championships in Dubrovnik, Croatia. He broke his own national record in the 200 meter freestyle the next month at the Olympics.

In July 2009, he set a new Israeli record in the 100 meter freestyle, at 48.93, at the World Championships in Rome, Italy. Also at the 2009 World Championships, he swam on the team that set a new Israeli record in the 4×100 meter medley relay, at 3:36.23.

In August 2009, he won gold medals in the 50 m (22.75; surpassing the 14-year-old former record of 22.79), 100 m (49.49), 200 m (1:49.36), and 400 m freestyle races at the Israeli Summer National Championships at Wingate Institute in Netanya. In July 2010, he won gold medals in the 50 m, 100 m (49.89), 200 m, and 400 m freestyle races at the Israeli Long Course National Championships.

=== College ===
After high school, Nimrod Shapira attended the University of Arizona, where he majored in business management. In 2009, he was a silver medalist at the NCAA Championships at College Station, Texas as part of the Arizona Wildcats 800 free relay team (6:11.82), and in 2010, he was a bronze medalist in the same event in Columbus, Ohio. He was honored as a member of the Pac-10 All-Academic First Team. He was named the Counsilman-Hunsaker National Collegiate Swimmer-of-the-Week on November 17, 2010, and again honored in 2011 as a member of the Pac-10 All-Academic First Team. His fastest times in college competitions, through March 2011, were 19.92 in the 50 yard freestyle (2010), 42.37 in the 100 y freestyle (2011), 46.44 in the 100 y fly (2010), 1:33.50 in the 200 y freestyle (2010), 1:43.71 in the 200 y fly (2010), and 1:44.85 in the 200 y IM (2011).

=== Olympics ===
Shapira is a two-time Olympian. He competed on behalf of Israel at the 2008 Summer Olympics in Beijing, China. In the 100 meter freestyle he swam a 49.10 (a national record) and came in 26th, and in the 200 meter freestyle he swam a 1:47.78 (also a national record) in the first heat, and a 1:48.16 in the semi-finals, coming in 15th. He was the first Israeli swimmer to compete in an Olympic semi-finals.

He competed on behalf of Israel at the 2012 Summer Olympics, in London in the 200 m freestyle, finishing in 21st place.

=== Maccabiah Games ===
He won a silver medal in the 100 m freestyle (49.02; behind Jason Lezak, and a new Israeli record) at the July 2009 Maccabiah Games.

=== Entrepreneurship and business ===
Shapira was born to a family of business owners and saw all the ups and downs that came with owning your own business. At age 7, he began to raise and sell rabbits from his family farm in South Israel. Upon graduating The University of Arizona in 2013, he got into the business side of the swimming world and started a swim club and swim school. After starting AquaSwimClub with only $480 and turning it into a successful 7-location business, Shapira began to focus more on the swim school side of the industry. Today, AQUAfin Swim School is the number one swim school in Northeast Florida, with 3 locations in and around Jacksonville, FL and still growing. Shapira has recently begun his journey as a franchisor with AQUAfin Swim School's first franchise location opening in August 2022 in Orange City, FL. He is also a real estate investor with $6m+ of personal holdings.

== See also ==
- List of Israeli records in swimming
