= Norbert Trandafir =

Romanian swimmer

Medal record

Men's swimming

Representing Romania

European Aquatics Championships
Bronze medal – third place	2012 Debrecen	100 m freestyle

Summer Universiade
Silver medal – second place	2011 Shenzhen	100 m freestyle

Norbert Trandafir (born 8 February 1988 in Târgu Mureş) is a Romanian swimmer of partial Hungarian descent. He competed at the 2008, 2012 and 2016 Summer Olympics. He holds 2 Romanian records: the 50 m freestyle and the 50 m butterfly (short course).

== Personal bests ==
- 50 m freestyle : 21.98 (Barcelona, 2013) - Long course
- 100 m freestyle : 48.75 (Rome, 2009) - Long course
- 50 m butterfly : 24.26 (Rome, 2009) - Long course
