= Martín Kutscher =

Uruguayan swimmer (born 1984)

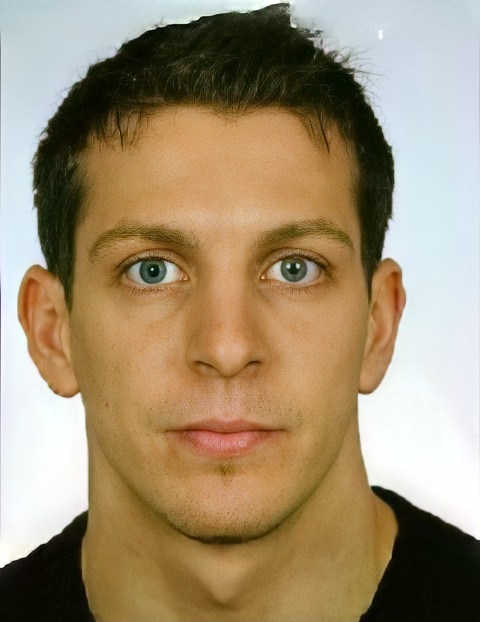

Personal information
- Full name: Martín Daniel Kutscher Belgeri
- Nationality: Uruguay
- Born: December 9, 1984 (age 41) Salto, Uruguay
- Height: 1.84 m (6 ft 1/2 in)

Sport
- Sport: Swimming
- Strokes: freestyle
Medal record
Representing Uruguay
South American Games
| Gold medal – first place | 2006 Buenos Aires | 200m freestyle |
| Bronze medal – third place | 2006 Buenos Aires | 4x100m freestyle relay |

Martín Kutscher (born December 9, 1984, in Salto, Uruguay) is a national-record holding freestyle swimmer from Uruguay who swam for Uruguay at 2004 and 2008 Olympics. His brother Paul is also an Olympic swimmer, having swum for Uruguay at the 2000 and 2004 Olympics.

== International tournaments ==
- 2004 Olympics
- 2007 World Championships
- 2007 Pan American Games
- South American Swimming Championships 2008
- 2008 Olympics
- 2009 World Championships
