= Stefan Nystrand =

Swedish swimmer

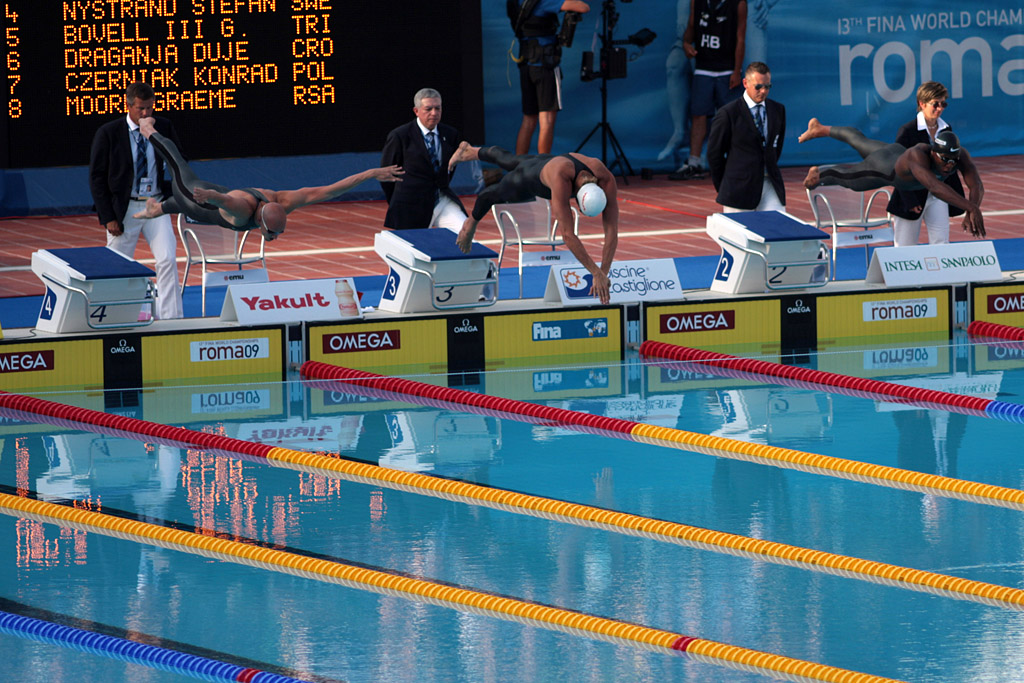
- Stefan Nystrand (Sweden, lane 4), Amaury Leveaux (France, lane 3) and Cullen Jones (USA, lane 2) in the men's 50m freestyle semifinals at the 2009 World Aquatics Championships.

Personal information
- Full name: Stefan Nystrand
- Nationality: Sweden
- Born: 20 October 1981 (age 44) Haninge, Sweden
- Height: 1.93 m (6 ft 4 in)
- Weight: 85 kg (187 lb)

Sport
- Sport: Swimming
- Strokes: Freestyle
- Club: SK Neptun
Medal record
Event	1st	2nd	3rd
World Championships (LC)	0	0	1
World Championships (SC)	1	4	4
European Championships (LC)	1	7	3
European Championships (SC)	11	3	2
Total	13	14	10
World Championships (LC)
Bronze medal – third place	2007 Melbourne	50 m freestyle
World Championships (SC)
Gold medal – first place	2000 Athens	4×100 m freestyle
Silver medal – second place	2000 Athens	100 m freestyle
Silver medal – second place	2002 Moscow	4×100 m freestyle
Silver medal – second place	2004 Indianapolis	50 m freestyle
Silver medal – second place	2006 Shanghai	4×100 m freestyle
Bronze medal – third place	2000 Athens	50 m freestyle
Bronze medal – third place	2004 Indianapolis	50 m breaststroke
Bronze medal – third place	2006 Shanghai	100 m individual medley
Bronze medal – third place	2008 Manchester	4×100 m freestyle
European Championships (LC)
Gold medal – first place	2008 Eindhoven	4×100 m freestyle
Silver medal – second place	2000 Helsinki	4×100 m medley
Silver medal – second place	2002 Berlin	4×100 m freestyle
Silver medal – second place	2004 Madrid	50 m freestyle
Silver medal – second place	2006 Budapest	100 m freestyle
Silver medal – second place	2008 Eindhoven	100 m freestyle
Silver medal – second place	2010 Budapest	50 m freestyle
Silver medal – second place	2012 Debrecen	50 m freestyle
Bronze medal – third place	2008 Eindhoven	50 m freestyle
Bronze medal – third place	2008 Eindhoven	4×100 m medley
Bronze medal – third place	2010 Budapest	4×100 m freestyle
European Championships (SC)
Gold medal – first place	1999 Lisboa	4×50 m freestyle
Gold medal – first place	1999 Lisboa	4×50 m medley
Gold medal – first place	2000 Valencia	50 m freestyle
Gold medal – first place	2000 Valencia	100 m freestyle
Gold medal – first place	2000 Valencia	4×50 m freestyle
Gold medal – first place	2001 Antwerp	50 m freestyle
Gold medal – first place	2001 Antwerp	100 m freestyle
Gold medal – first place	2002 Riesa	50 m freestyle
Gold medal – first place	2006 Helsinki	4×50 m freestyle
Gold medal – first place	2007 Debrecen	50 m freestyle
Gold medal – first place	2007 Debrecen	4×50 m freestyle
Silver medal – second place	2003 Dublin	4×50 m medley
Silver medal – second place	2006 Helsinki	100 m freestyle
Silver medal – second place	2007 Debrecen	100 m freestyle
Bronze medal – third place	2001 Antwerp	4×50 m freestyle
Bronze medal – third place	2001 Antwerp	4×50 m medley

Stefan Nystrand (born 20 October 1981) is a freestyle swimmer from Sweden.

== Biography ==
His father Sture Nystrand is a Swede and his mother Smiljana Kokeza is a Croat from Split.

Nystrand, a short course (25 m) specialist, has won five individual medals in the FINA Short Course World Championships, and captured his first medal (silver) in long course (50 m) in the 100 m freestyle at the 2006 European Aquatics Championships in Budapest, behind Filippo Magnini of Italy. The following year he won a bronze medal at the 2007 World Aquatics Championships in Melbourne at the 50 m freestyle, with a new national record of 21.97.

After breaking the 48 second barrier in the 100 m freestyle long course (he was only the second person to do so after then world record holder Pieter van den Hoogenband) in Paris, Nystrand revealed that he averages less than 3,000 meters a practice, a minuscule amount compared to other professional swimmers, and never more than 20,000 meters a week. He is also noted for having an atypical front crawl technique in which his arms do not bend during the recovery phase. Normally, a swimmer will bend the arm at the elbow while above water to improve their line in the water.

Nystrand has also competed at the Olympic Games, in 2000, 2004, 2008 and 2012. His best placing at the Games is the fourth place he got at the 50 metre freestyle event, 0.06 seconds behind South African medallist Roland Schoeman. At the Berlin round of the 2007 FINA World Cup, Nystrand broke the 100 m freestyle and 50 m freestyle (both short course) world records.

== Personal bests ==
=== Long course (50 m) ===
Event	Time		Date	Meet	Location	Ref
50 m freestyle	21.45	NR (sf)	31 Jul 2009	World Championships	Rome, Italy	
100 m freestyle	47.37	NR	30 Jul 2009	World Championships	Rome, Italy	
50 m breaststroke	28.66	(sf)	13 May 2004	European LC Championships	Madrid, Spain	

Legend: WR – World record; ER – European record; NR – Swedish record;
Records not set in finals: h – heat; sf – semifinal; r – relay 1st leg; rh – relay heat 1st leg; b – B final; † – en route to final mark; so – swim-off; tt – time trial

=== Short course (25 m) ===
Event	Time		Date	Meet	Location	Ref
50 m freestyle	20.70	NR	15 Nov 2009	World Cup	Berlin, Germany	
100 m freestyle	45.54	NR	10 Nov 2009	World Cup	Stockholm, Sweden	
50 m breaststroke	26.70		28 Nov 2009	Swedish SC Championships	Gothenburg, Sweden	
50 m butterfly	23.75	(h)	25 Oct 2008	World Cup	Sydney, Australia	
100 m individual medley	53.97	NR	9 Apr 2006	World SC Championships	Shanghai, China	

Legend: WR – World record; ER – European record; NR – Swedish record;
Records not set in finals: h – heat; sf – semifinal; r – relay 1st leg; rh – relay heat 1st leg; b – B final; † – en route to final mark; so – swim-off; tt – time trial

== Clubs ==
- Södertörns SS (−2006)
- SK Neptun (2006–2011)
- Spårvägens SF (2011–)

== See also ==
- World record progression 50 metres freestyle
- World record progression 100 metres freestyle

Records
Preceded by Roland Schoeman	Men's 50 metres freestyle world record holder (short course); 18 November 2007 – 11 April 2008	Succeeded by Duje Draganja
Preceded by Ian Crocker and Roland Schoeman	Men's 100 metres freestyle world record holder (short course); 17 November 2007 – 7 December 2008	Succeeded by Alain Bernard
Sporting positions
Preceded by John Miranda	Swedish National LC Champion; Men's 50 m freestyle 2001–2004	Succeeded by Marcus Piehl
Preceded by Marcus Piehl	Swedish National LC Champion; Men's 50 m freestyle 2006–2007	Succeeded by Incumbent
