= List of European Short Course Swimming Championships medalists (men) =

This is the complete list of men's European Short Course Swimming Championships medalists in swimming from 1991 to 2025. From 1991 to 1994 this event was held as the European Sprint Swimming Championships, where only the 50 meter events, the 100 meter individual medley, and both men's 4 × 50 meter relays were contested.

== Current program ==
=== 50 m freestyle ===
| Year | Gold | Silver | Bronze |
|---|---|---|---|
| 1991 Gelsenkirchen | Alexander Popov (URS) | Silko Günzel (GER) | Joakim Holmqvist (SWE) |
| 1992 Espoo | Yuriy Vlasov (UKR) | Mark Pinger (GER) | Mark Foster (GBR) |
| 1993 Gateshead | Joakim Holmqvist (SWE) | Vladimir Predkin (RUS) | none awarded |
| 1993 Gateshead | Joakim Holmqvist (SWE) | Silko Günzel (GER) | none awarded |
| 1994 Stavanger | Krzysztof Cwalina (POL) | Joakim Holmqvist (SWE) | Silko Günzel (GER) |
| 1996 Rostock | Mark Foster (GBR) | René Gusperti (ITA) | Dimitri Kalinovski (BLR) |
| 1998 Sheffield | Mark Foster (GBR) | Mark Veens (NED) | Pieter v/d Hoogenband (NED) |
| 1999 Lisbon | Mark Foster (GBR) | Pieter v/d Hoogenband (NED) | Lorenzo Vismara (ITA) |
| 2000 Valencia | Stefan Nystrand (SWE) | Mark Foster (GBR) | Oleksandr Volynets (UKR) |
| 2001 Antwerp | Stefan Nystrand (SWE) | Oleksandr Volynets (UKR) | Pieter v/d Hoogenband (NED) |
| 2002 Riesa | Stefan Nystrand (SWE) | Lorenzo Vismara (ITA) | Rolandas Gimbutis (LTU) |
| 2003 Dublin | Mark Foster (GBR) | Milorad Čavić (SCG) | Bartosz Kizierowski (POL) |
| 2004 Vienna | Mark Foster (GBR) | Mark Veens (NED) | Eduardo Lorente (ESP) |
| 2005 Trieste | Mark Foster (GBR) | Frédérick Bousquet (FRA) | Johan Kenkhuis (NED) |
| 2006 Helsinki | Eduardo Lorente (ESP) | Milorad Čavić (SRB) | Julien Sicot (FRA) |
| 2007 Debrecen | Stefan Nystrand (SWE) | Duje Draganja (CRO) | Alain Bernard (FRA) |
| 2008 Rijeka | Amaury Leveaux (FRA) | Frédérick Bousquet (FRA) | Yevgeny Lagunov (RUS) |
| 2008 Rijeka | Amaury Leveaux (FRA) | Frédérick Bousquet (FRA) | Duje Draganja (CRO) |
| 2009 Istanbul | Frédérick Bousquet (FRA) | Duje Draganja (CRO) | Sergey Fesikov (RUS) |
| 2010 Eindhoven | Steffen Deibler (GER) | Marco Orsi (ITA) | Andriy Hovorov (UKR) |
| 2011 Szczecin | Konrad Czerniak (POL) | Sergey Fesikov (RUS) | Marco Orsi (ITA) |
| 2012 Chartres | Florent Manaudou (FRA) | Vladimir Morozov (RUS) | Frédérick Bousquet (FRA) |
| 2013 Herning | Vladimir Morozov (RUS) | Marco Orsi (ITA) | Andriy Hovorov (UKR) |
| 2015 Netanya | Evgeny Sedov (RUS) | Marco Orsi (ITA) | Sebastian Szczepanski (POL) |
| 2017 Copenhagen | Vladimir Morozov (RUS) | Ben Proud (GBR) | Luca Dotto (ITA) |
| 2019 Glasgow | Vladimir Morozov (RUS) | Florent Manaudou (FRA) | Maxim Lobanovszkij (HUN) |
| 2021 Kazan | Szebasztián Szabó (HUN) | Lorenzo Zazzeri (ITA) | Paweł Juraszek (POL) |
| 2021 Kazan | Szebasztián Szabó (HUN) | Lorenzo Zazzeri (ITA) | Vladimir Morozov (RUS) |
| 2023 Otopeni | Benjamin Proud (GBR) | Florent Manaudou (FRA) | none awarded |
| 2023 Otopeni | Benjamin Proud (GBR) | Szebasztián Szabó (HUN) | none awarded |
| 2025 Lublin | Jere Hribar (CRO) | Maxime Grousset (FRA) | not awarded |
| 2025 Lublin | Jere Hribar (CRO) | Nikita Sheremet (UKR) | not awarded |

=== 100 m freestyle ===
| Year | Gold | Silver | Bronze |
|---|---|---|---|
| 1996 Rostock | Lars Conrad (GER) | Nicolae Butacu (ROM) | Nicolae Ivan (ROM) |
| 1998 Sheffield | Lars Frölander (SWE) | Pieter v/d Hoogenband (NED) | Mark Veens (NED) |
| 1999 Lisbon | Pieter v/d Hoogenband (NED) | Lars Frölander (SWE) | Karel Novy (SUI) |
| 2000 Valencia | Stefan Nystrand (SWE) | Denis Pimankov (RUS) | Karel Novy (SUI) |
| 2001 Antwerp | Stefan Nystrand (SWE) | Pieter v/d Hoogenband (NED) | Romain Barnier (FRA) |
| 2001 Antwerp | Stefan Nystrand (SWE) | Pieter v/d Hoogenband (NED) | Duje Draganja (CRO) |
| 2002 Riesa | Lorenzo Vismara (ITA) | Jere Hård (FIN) | Johan Kenkhuis (NED) |
| 2003 Dublin | Pieter v/d Hoogenband (NED) | Filippo Magnini (ITA) | Christian Galenda (ITA) |
| 2004 Vienna | Frédérick Bousquet (FRA) | Filippo Magnini (ITA) | Jens Schreiber (GER) |
| 2005 Trieste | Filippo Magnini (ITA) | Steffen Deibler (GER) | Yevgeny Lagunov (RUS) |
| 2006 Helsinki | Filippo Magnini (ITA) | Stefan Nystrand (SWE) | Alain Bernard (FRA) |
| 2007 Debrecen | Alain Bernard (FRA) | Stefan Nystrand (SWE) | Filippo Magnini (ITA) |
| 2008 Rijeka | Amaury Leveaux (FRA) | Fabien Gilot (FRA) | Filippo Magnini (ITA) |
| 2009 Istanbul | Amaury Leveaux (FRA) | Daniil Izotov (RUS) | Yevgeny Lagunov (RUS) |
| 2010 Eindhoven | Danila Izotov (RUS) | Yevgeny Lagunov (RUS) | Luca Dotto (ITA) |
| 2011 Szczecin | Sergey Fesikov (RUS) | Luca Dotto (ITA) | Krisztián Takács (HUN) |
| 2012 Chartres | Vladimir Morozov (RUS) | Yevgeny Lagunov (RUS) | Yannick Agnel (FRA) |
| 2013 Herning | Vladimir Morozov (RUS) | Danila Izotov (RUS) | Marco Orsi (ITA) |
| 2015 Netanya | Marco Orsi (ITA) | Pieter Timmers (BEL) | Sebastian Szczepanski (POL) |
| 2017 Copenhagen | Luca Dotto (ITA) | Pieter Timmers (BEL) | Duncan Scott (GBR) |
| 2019 Glasgow | Vladimir Morozov (RUS) | Alessandro Miressi (ITA) | Vladislav Grinev (RUS) |
| 2021 Kazan | Kliment Kolesnikov (RUS) | Alessandro Miressi (ITA) | Vladislav Grinev (RUS) |
| 2023 Otopeni | Maxime Grousset (FRA) | Alessandro Miressi (ITA) | David Popovici (ROU) |
| 2025 Lublin | Maxime Grousset (FRA) | Jere Hribar (CRO) | Matthew Richards (GBR) |

=== 200 m freestyle ===
| Year | Gold | Silver | Bronze |
|---|---|---|---|
| 1996 Rostock | Lars Conrad (GER) | Andrew Clayton (GBR) | Konstantin Dubrovin (GER) |
| 1998 Sheffield | Pieter v/d Hoogenband (NED) | Massimiliano Rossolino (ITA) | Jacob Carstensen (DEN) |
| 1999 Lisbon | Pieter v/d Hoogenband (NED) | Massimiliano Rossolino (ITA) | Stefan Herbst (GER) |
| 2000 Valencia | Massimiliano Rossolino (ITA) | Květoslav Svoboda (CZE) | Paul Palmer (GBR) |
| 2001 Antwerp | Pieter v/d Hoogenband (NED) | Květoslav Svoboda (CZE) | Stefan Herbst (GER) |
| 2002 Riesa | Emiliano Brembilla (ITA) | Květoslav Svoboda (CZE) | Matteo Pelliciari (ITA) |
| 2003 Dublin | Pieter v/d Hoogenband (NED) | Květoslav Svoboda (CZE) | Saulius Binevičius (LTU) |
| 2004 Vienna | Filippo Magnini (ITA) | Massimiliano Rossolino (ITA) | Paweł Korzeniowski (POL) |
| 2005 Trieste | Filippo Magnini (ITA) | Massimiliano Rossolino (ITA) | Ross Davenport (GBR) |
| 2006 Helsinki | Filippo Magnini (ITA) | Massimiliano Rossolino (ITA) | Paweł Korzeniowski (POL) |
| 2007 Debrecen | Filippo Magnini (ITA) | Paul Biedermann (GER) | Paweł Korzeniowski (POL) |
| 2008 Rijeka | Danila Izotov (RUS) | Dominik Meichtry (SUI) | Massimiliano Rossolino (ITA) |
| 2009 Istanbul | Paul Biedermann (GER) | Daniil Izotov (RUS) | Nikita Lobintsev (RUS) |
| 2010 Eindhoven | Daniil Izotov (RUS) | Paul Biedermann (GER) | Yevgeny Lagunov (RUS) |
| 2011 Szczecin | Paul Biedermann (GER) | Filippo Magnini (ITA) | László Cseh (HUN) |
| 2012 Chartres | Yannick Agnel (FRA) | Pieter Timmers (BEL) | Grégory Mallet (FRA) |
| 2013 Herning | Danila Izotov (RUS) | Nikita Lobintsev (RUS) | Dominik Kozma (HUN) |
| 2013 Herning | Danila Izotov (RUS) | Nikita Lobintsev (RUS) | Filippo Magnini (ITA) |
| 2015 Netanya | Paul Biedermann (GER) | Pieter Timmers (BEL) | Glenn Surgeloose (BEL) |
| 2015 Netanya | Paul Biedermann (GER) | Pieter Timmers (BEL) | Viacheslav Andrusenko (RUS) |
| 2017 Copenhagen | Danas Rapšys (LTU) | Aleksandr Krasnykh (RUS) | Duncan Scott (GBR) |
| 2019 Glasgow | Danas Rapšys (LTU) | Duncan Scott (GBR) | Mikhail Vekovishchev (RUS) |
| 2021 Kazan | David Popovici (ROU) | Luc Kroon (NED) | Stan Pijnenburg (NED) |
| 2023 Otopeni | Matt Richards (GBR) | James Guy (GBR) | Danas Rapšys (LTU) |
| 2025 Lublin | Duncan Scott (GBR) | Jack McMillan (GBR) | Evan Bailey (IRL); Kamil Sieradzki (POL) |

=== 400 m freestyle ===
| Year | Gold | Silver | Bronze |
|---|---|---|---|
| 1996 Rostock | Emiliano Brembilla (ITA) | Stefan Pohl (GER) | Dimitrios Manganas (GRE) |
| 1998 Sheffield | Emiliano Brembilla (ITA) | Massimiliano Rossolino (ITA) | Jacob Carstensen (DEN) |
| 1999 Lisbon | Massimiliano Rossolino (ITA) | Jörg Hoffmann (GER) | James Salter (GBR) |
| 2000 Valencia | Massimiliano Rossolino (ITA) | Paul Palmer (GBR) | Květoslav Svoboda (CZE) |
| 2001 Antwerp | Emiliano Brembilla (ITA) | Jörg Hoffmann (GER) | Jacob Carstensen (DEN) |
| 2002 Riesa | Emiliano Brembilla (ITA) | Yuri Prilukov (RUS) | Athanasios Oikonomou (GRE) |
| 2003 Dublin | Massimiliano Rossolino (ITA) | none awarded | Květoslav Svoboda (CZE) |
| 2003 Dublin | Yuri Prilukov (RUS) | none awarded | Květoslav Svoboda (CZE) |
| 2004 Vienna | Massimiliano Rossolino (ITA) | Yuri Prilukov (RUS) | Paweł Korzeniowski (POL) |
| 2005 Trieste | Yuri Prilukov (RUS) | Paweł Korzeniowski (POL) | Paul Biedermann (GER) |
| 2006 Helsinki | Yuri Prilukov (RUS) | Przemysław Stańczyk (POL) | Paweł Korzeniowski (POL) |
| 2007 Debrecen | Paweł Korzeniowski (POL) | Paul Biedermann (GER) | Gergő Kis (HUN) |
| 2008 Rijeka | Paul Biedermann (GER) | Massimiliano Rossolino (ITA) | Mads Glæsner (DEN) |
| 2009 Istanbul | Paul Biedermann (GER) | Nikita Lobintsev (RUS) | Mads Glæsner (DEN) |
| 2010 Eindhoven | Paul Biedermann (GER) | Federico Colbertaldo (ITA) | Alexander Selin (RUS) |
| 2011 Szczecin | Paul Biedermann (GER) | Mads Glæsner (DEN) | Paweł Korzeniowski (POL) |
| 2012 Chartres | Yannick Agnel (FRA) | Gabriele Detti (ITA) | Andrea Mitchell D'Arrigo (ITA) |
| 2013 Herning | Nikita Lobintsev (RUS) | Andrea D'Arrigo (ITA) | Velimir Stjepanović (SRB) |
| 2015 Netanya | Péter Bernek (HUN) | Paul Biedermann (GER) | Gabriele Detti (ITA) |
| 2017 Copenhagen | Aleksandr Krasnykh (RUS) | Péter Bernek (HUN) | Henrik Christiansen (NOR) |
| 2019 Glasgow | Danas Rapšys (LTU) | Thomas Dean (GBR) | Gabriele Detti (ITA) |
| 2021 Kazan | Luc Kroon (NED) | Matteo Ciampi (ITA) | Marco De Tullio (ITA) |
| 2023 Otopeni | Daniel Wiffen (IRL) | Danas Rapšys (LTU) | Lucas Henveaux (BEL) |
| 2025 Lublin | Jack McMillan (GBR) | Lukas Märtens (GER) | Daniel Wiffen (IRL) |

=== 800 m freestyle ===
| Year | Gold | Silver | Bronze |
|---|---|---|---|
| 2021 Kazan | Gregorio Paltrinieri (ITA) | Florian Wellbrock (GER) | Sven Schwarz (GER) |
| 2023 Otopeni | Daniel Wiffen (IRL) | David Aubry (FRA) | Mykhailo Romanchuk (UKR) |
| 2025 Lublin | Zalán Sárkány (HUN) | Lucas Henveaux (BEL) | Daniel Wiffen (IRL) |

=== 1500 m freestyle ===
| Year | Gold | Silver | Bronze |
|---|---|---|---|
| 1996 Rostock | Igor Snitko (UKR) | Ian Wilson (GBR) | Thomas Lohfink (GER) |
| 1998 Sheffield | Graeme Smith (GBR) | Igor Snitko (UKR) | Emiliano Brembilla (ITA) |
| 1999 Lisbon | Igor Chervynskyi (UKR) | Jörg Hoffmann (GER) | Teo Edo (ESP) |
| 2000 Valencia | Massimiliano Rossolino (ITA) | Frederik Hviid (ESP) | Igor Chervynskyi (UKR) |
| 2001 Antwerp | Jörg Hoffmann (GER) | Alexei Filipets (RUS) | Nicolas Rostoucher (FRA) |
| 2002 Riesa | Yuri Prilukov (RUS) | David Davies (GBR) | Christian Minotti (ITA) |
| 2003 Dublin | Yuri Prilukov (RUS) | Graeme Smith (GBR) | Massimiliano Rossolino (ITA) |
| 2004 Vienna | Yuri Prilukov (RUS) | David Davies (GBR) | Massimiliano Rossolino (ITA) |
| 2005 Trieste | Yuri Prilukov (RUS) | David Davies (GBR) | Mateusz Sawrymowicz (POL) |
| 2006 Helsinki | Yuri Prilukov (RUS) | Mateusz Sawrymowicz (POL) | Sébastien Rouault (FRA) |
| 2007 Debrecen | Mateusz Sawrymowicz (POL) | Gergő Kis (HUN) | Federico Colbertaldo (ITA) |
| 2008 Rijeka | Federico Colbertaldo (ITA) | Vitaly Romanovich (RUS) | Samuel Pizzetti (ITA) |
| 2009 Istanbul | Jan Wolfgarten (GER) | Federico Colbertaldo (ITA) | Mads Glæsner (DEN) |
| 2010 Eindhoven | Federico Colbertaldo (ITA) | Serhiy Frolov (UKR) | Job Kienhuis (NED) |
| 2011 Szczecin | Mateusz Sawrymowicz (POL) | Mads Glæsner (DEN) | Serhiy Frolov (UKR) |
| 2012 Chartres | Gregorio Paltrinieri (ITA) | Serhiy Frolov (UKR) | Anthony Pannier (FRA) |
| 2013 Herning | Gergely Gyurta (HUN) | Pál Joensen (FRO) | Gabriele Detti (ITA) |
| 2015 Netanya | Gregorio Paltrinieri (ITA) | Gabriele Detti (ITA) | Henrik Christiansen (NOR) |
| 2017 Copenhagen | Mykhailo Romanchuk (UKR) | Gregorio Paltrinieri (ITA) | Henrik Christiansen (NOR) |
| 2019 Glasgow | Gregorio Paltrinieri (ITA) | Henrik Christiansen (NOR) | David Aubry (FRA) |
| 2021 Kazan | Florian Wellbrock (GER) | Gregorio Paltrinieri (ITA) | Sven Schwarz (GER) |
| 2023 Otopeni | Daniel Wiffen (IRL) | David Aubry (FRA) | Mykhailo Romanchuk (UKR) |
| 2025 Lublin | Daniel Wiffen (IRL) | Zalán Sárkány (HUN) | Florian Wellbrock (GER) |

=== 50 m backstroke ===
| Year | Gold | Silver | Bronze |
|---|---|---|---|
| 1991 Gelsenkirchen | Jani Sievinen (FIN) | Vladimir Selkov (URS) | Jens Bünger (GER) |
| 1992 Espoo | Jani Sievinen (FIN) | Rudi Dollmayer (SWE) | Patrick Hermanspann (GER) |
| 1993 Gateshead | Patrick Hermanspann (GER) | Tino Weber (GER) | Zsolt Hegmegi (SWE) |
| 1994 Stavanger | Jirka Letzin (GER) | Zsolt Hegmegi (SWE) | Miloslav Dolnik (SVK) |
| 1996 Rostock | Mariusz Siembida (POL) | Tomislav Karlo (CRO) | Stev Theloke (GER) |
| 1998 Sheffield | Thomas Rupprath (GER) | Stev Theloke (GER) | Daniel Carlsson (SWE) |
| 1999 Lisbon | Miro Žeravica (CRO) | Tomislav Karlo (CRO) | Sebastian Halgasch (GER) |
| 2000 Valencia | Ante Mašković (CRO) | Örn Arnarson (ISL) | Darius Grigalionis (LTU) |
| 2001 Antwerp | Stev Theloke (GER) | Ante Mašković (CRO) | Peter Mankoč (SLO) |
| 2002 Riesa | Thomas Rupprath (GER) | Stev Theloke (GER) | Darius Grigalionis (LTU) |
| 2003 Dublin | Thomas Rupprath (GER) | Vyacheslav Shyrshov (UKR) | Toni Helbig (GER) |
| 2004 Vienna | Thomas Rupprath (GER) | Vyacheslav Shyrshov (UKR) | Helge Meeuw (GER) |
| 2005 Trieste | Thomas Rupprath (GER) | Arkady Vyatchanin (RUS) | Liam Tancock (GBR) |
| 2006 Helsinki | Helge Meeuw (GER) | Thomas Rupprath (GER) | Ľuboš Križko (SVK) |
| 2007 Debrecen | Thomas Rupprath (GER) | Helge Meeuw (GER) | Aschwin Wildeboer (ESP) |
| 2008 Rijeka | Stanislav Donets (RUS) | Aschwin Wildeboer (ESP) | Ľuboš Križko (SVK) |
| 2009 Istanbul | Stanislav Donets (RUS) | Thomas Rupprath (GER) | Aschwin Wildeboer (ESP) |
| 2010 Eindhoven | Stanislav Donets (RUS) | Vitaly Borisov (RUS) | Nick Driebergen (NED) |
| 2011 Szczecin | Aschwin Wildeboer (ESP) | Flori Lang (SUI) | Pavel Sankovich (BLR) |
| 2012 Chartres | Jérémy Stravius (FRA) | Guy Barnea (ISR) | Vladimir Morozov (RUS) |
| 2013 Herning | Jérémy Stravius (FRA) | Christian Diener (GER) | Pavel Sankovich (BLR) |
| 2015 Netanya | Tomasz Polewka (POL) | Chris Walker-Hebborn (GBR) | none awarded |
| 2015 Netanya | Tomasz Polewka (POL) | Simone Sabbioni (ITA) | none awarded |
| 2017 Copenhagen | Simone Sabbioni (ITA) | Kliment Kolesnikov (RUS) | Jérémy Stravius (FRA) |
| 2019 Glasgow | Kliment Kolesnikov (RUS) | Christian Diener (GER) | Shane Ryan (IRL) |
| 2021 Kazan | Kliment Kolesnikov (RUS) | Michele Lamberti (ITA) | Robert Glință (ROU) |
| 2023 Otopeni | Mewen Tomac (FRA) | Ole Braunschweig (GER) | Lorenzo Mora (ITA) |
| 2023 Otopeni | Mewen Tomac (FRA) | Ole Braunschweig (GER) | Thierry Bollin (SUI) |
| 2025 Lublin | Ralf Tribuntsov (EST) | Miroslav Knedla (CZE) | Francesco Lazzari (ITA) |

=== 100 m backstroke ===
| Year | Gold | Silver | Bronze |
|---|---|---|---|
| 1996 Rostock | Mariusz Siembida (POL) | Stev Theloke (GER) | Emanuele Merisi (ITA) |
| 1998 Sheffield | Stev Theloke (GER) | Darius Grigalionis (LTU) | Eithan Urbach (ISR) |
| 1999 Lisbon | Örn Arnarson (ISL) | Derya Büyükunçu (TUR) | Volodymyr Nikolaychuk (UKR) |
| 2000 Valencia | Örn Arnarson (ISL) | Gordan Kožulj (CRO) | Przemyslan Wilant (POL) |
| 2001 Antwerp | Thomas Rupprath (GER) | Stev Theloke (GER) | Gregor Tait (GBR) |
| 2002 Riesa | Thomas Rupprath (GER) | Stev Theloke (GER) | Örn Arnarson (ISL) |
| 2003 Dublin | Thomas Rupprath (GER) | Örn Arnarson (ISL) | Steffen Driesen (GER) |
| 2004 Vienna | Thomas Rupprath (GER) | Markus Rogan (AUT) | László Cseh (HUN) |
| 2005 Trieste | László Cseh (HUN) | Arkady Vyatchanin (RUS) | Thomas Rupprath (GER) |
| 2006 Helsinki | Arkady Vyatchanin (RUS) | Helge Meeuw (GER) | Thomas Rupprath (GER) |
| 2007 Debrecen | Stanislav Donets (RUS) | Markus Rogan (AUT) | Helge Meeuw (GER) |
| 2008 Rijeka | Stanislav Donets (RUS) | Aschwin Wildeboer (ESP) | Helge Meeuw (GER) |
| 2009 Istanbul | Stanislav Donets (RUS) | none awarded | Aschwin Wildeboer (ESP) |
| 2009 Istanbul | Arkady Vyatchanin (RUS) | none awarded | Aschwin Wildeboer (ESP) |
| 2010 Eindhoven | Stanislav Donets (RUS) | Damiano Lestingi (ITA) | Artem Dubovskoy (RUS) |
| 2011 Szczecin | Radosław Kawęcki (POL) | Aschwin Wildeboer (ESP) | Pavel Sankovich (BLR) |
| 2012 Chartres | Jérémy Stravius (FRA) | Benjamin Stasiulis (FRA) | Damiano Lestingi (ITA) |
| 2013 Herning | Jérémy Stravius (FRA) | Camille Lacourt (FRA) | none awarded |
| 2013 Herning | Jérémy Stravius (FRA) | Chris Walker-Hebborn (GBR) | none awarded |
| 2015 Netanya | Radosław Kawęcki (POL) | Stanislav Donets (RUS) | Chris Walker-Hebborn (GBR) |
| 2017 Copenhagen | Kliment Kolesnikov (RUS) | Simone Sabbioni (ITA) | Robert Glință (ROU) |
| 2019 Glasgow | Kliment Kolesnikov (RUS) | Christian Diener (GER) | Robert Glință (ROU) |
| 2021 Kazan | Kliment Kolesnikov (RUS) | Robert Glință (ROU) | Apostolos Christou (GRE) |
| 2023 Otopeni | Mewen Tomac (FRA) | Yohann Ndoye-Brouard (FRA) | Lorenzo Mora (ITA) |
| 2023 Otopeni | Mewen Tomac (FRA) | Yohann Ndoye-Brouard (FRA) | Andrei Ungur (ROU) |
| 2025 Lublin | Thomas Ceccon (ITA) | Mewen Tomac (FRA) | Oliver Morgan (GBR) |

=== 200 m backstroke ===
| Year | Gold | Silver | Bronze |
|---|---|---|---|
| 1996 Rostock | Emanuele Merisi (ITA) | Nicolae Butacu (ROM) | Stev Theloke (GER) |
| 1998 Sheffield | Örn Arnarson (ISL) | Adam Ruckwood (GBR) | Jorge Sánchez (ESP) |
| 1999 Lisbon | Örn Arnarson (ISL) | Jirka Letzin (GER) | Adam Ruckwood (GBR) |
| 2000 Valencia | Örn Arnarson (ISL) | Gordan Kožulj (CRO) | Blaž Medvešek (SLO) |
| 2001 Antwerp | Gordan Kožulj (CRO) | Yoav Gath (ISR) | Simon Dufour (FRA) |
| 2002 Riesa | Örn Arnarson (ISL) | Stephen Parry (GBR) | Gordan Kožulj (CRO) |
| 2003 Dublin | Blaž Medvešek (SLO) | Steffen Driesen (GER) | Markus Rogan (AUT) |
| 2004 Vienna | Markus Rogan (AUT) | Blaž Medvešek (SLO) | Yevgeni Aleshin (RUS) |
| 2005 Trieste | Markus Rogan (AUT) | Arkady Vyatchanin (RUS) | Gordan Kožulj (CRO) |
| 2006 Helsinki | Arkady Vyatchanin (RUS) | Helge Meeuw (GER) | Răzvan Florea (ROM) |
| 2007 Debrecen | Markus Rogan (AUT) | Stanislav Donets (RUS) | Aschwin Wildeboer (ESP) |
| 2008 Rijeka | Stanislav Donets (RUS) | none awarded | Pierre Roger (FRA) |
| 2008 Rijeka | Aschwin Wildeboer (ESP) | none awarded | Pierre Roger (FRA) |
| 2009 Istanbul | Stanislav Donets (RUS) | Radosław Kawęcki (POL) | Evgeny Aleshin (RUS) |
| 2010 Eindhoven | Yannick Lebherz (GER) | Damiano Lestingi (ITA) | Artem Dubovskoy (RUS) |
| 2011 Szczecin | Radosław Kawęcki (POL) | Aschwin Wildeboer (ESP) | Péter Bernek (HUN) |
| 2012 Chartres | Radosław Kawęcki (POL) | Péter Bernek (HUN) | Benjamin Stasiulis (FRA) |
| 2013 Herning | Radosław Kawęcki (POL) | Péter Bernek (HUN) | Christian Diener (GER) |
| 2015 Netanya | Radosław Kawęcki (POL) | Yakov Toumarkin (ISR) | Simone Sabbioni (ITA) |
| 2017 Copenhagen | Kliment Kolesnikov (RUS) | Radosław Kawęcki (POL) | Danas Rapšys (LTU) |
| 2019 Glasgow | Radosław Kawęcki (POL) | Christian Diener (GER) | Luke Greenbank (GBR) |
| 2021 Kazan | Radosław Kawęcki (POL) | Lorenzo Mora (ITA) | Michele Lamberti (ITA) |
| 2023 Otopeni | Lorenzo Mora (ITA) | Luke Greenbank (GBR) | Mewen Tomac (FRA) |
| 2025 Lublin | John Shortt (IRL) | Mewen Tomac (FRA) | Jan Cejka (CZE) |

=== 50 m breaststroke ===
| Year | Gold | Silver | Bronze |
|---|---|---|---|
| 1991 Gelsenkirchen | Vassily Ivanov (URS) | Ron Dekker (NED) | Gianni Minervini (ITA) |
| 1992 Espoo | Vassily Ivanov (RUS) | Ron Dekker (NED) | Dmitri Volkov (RUS) |
| 1993 Gateshead | Vassily Ivanov (RUS) | Ron Dekker (NED) | Mark Warnecke (GER) |
| 1994 Stavanger | Mark Warnecke (GER) | Ron Dekker (NED) | Dmitri Volkov (RUS) |
| 1996 Rostock | Patrik Isaksson (SWE) | Jens Kruppa (GER) | Daniel Málek (CZE) |
| 1998 Sheffield | Mark Warnecke (GER) | Patrik Isaksson (SWE) | Patrick Schmollinger (AUT) |
| 1999 Lisbon | Mark Warnecke (GER) | Oleh Lisohor (UKR) | Roman Sloudnov (RUS) |
| 2000 Valencia | Mark Warnecke (GER) | none awarded | none awarded |
| 2000 Valencia | Daniel Málek (CZE) | none awarded | none awarded |
| 2000 Valencia | Domenico Fioravanti (ITA) | none awarded | none awarded |
| 2001 Antwerp | Oleh Lisohor (UKR) | Mark Warnecke (GER) | Darren Mew (GBR) |
| 2002 Riesa | Oleh Lisohor (UKR) | Mark Warnecke (GER) | Jens Kruppa (GER) |
| 2003 Dublin | Oleh Lisohor (UKR) | Remo Lütolf (SUI) | Mark Warnecke (GER) |
| 2004 Vienna | Oleh Lisohor (UKR) | Roman Sloudnov (RUS) | Emil Tahirovič (SLO) |
| 2005 Trieste | Oleh Lisohor (UKR) | Alessandro Terrin (ITA) | Matjaž Markič (SLO) |
| 2006 Helsinki | Oleh Lisohor (UKR) | Alessandro Terrin (ITA) | Darren Mew (GBR) |
| 2007 Debrecen | Oleh Lisohor (UKR) | Aleksander Hetland (NOR) | Alessandro Terrin (ITA) |
| 2008 Rijeka | Matjaž Markič (SLO) | Aleksander Hetland (NOR) | Emil Tahirovič (SLO) |
| 2009 Istanbul | Aleksander Hetland (NOR) | Alessandro Terrin (ITA) | Čaba Silađi (SRB) |
| 2010 Eindhoven | Robin van Aggele (NED) | Aleksander Hetland (NOR) | Fabio Scozzoli (ITA) |
| 2010 Eindhoven | Robin van Aggele (NED) | Aleksander Hetland (NOR) | Hendrik Feldwehr (GER) |
| 2011 Szczecin | Fabio Scozzoli (ITA) | Damir Dugonjič (SLO) | Alexander Dale Oen (NOR) |
| 2012 Chartres | Fabio Scozzoli (ITA) | Aleksander Hetland (NOR) | Damir Dugonjič (SLO) |
| 2013 Herning | Damir Dugonjič (SVN) | Giacomo Perez-Dortona (FRA) | Barry Murphy (IRL) |
| 2015 Netanya | Damir Dugonjič (SVN) | Adam Peaty (GBR) | Oleg Kostin (RUS) |
| 2015 Netanya | Damir Dugonjič (SVN) | Adam Peaty (GBR) | Alexander Murphy (IRL) |
| 2017 Copenhagen | Fabio Scozzoli (ITA) | Kirill Prigoda (RUS) | Adam Peaty (GBR) |
| 2019 Glasgow | Vladimir Morozov (RUS) | Emre Sakçı (TUR) | Arno Kamminga (NED) |
| 2019 Glasgow | Vladimir Morozov (RUS) | Emre Sakçı (TUR) | Fabio Scozzoli (ITA) |
| 2021 Kazan | Ilya Shymanovich (BLR) | Emre Sakçı (TUR) | Nicolò Martinenghi (ITA) |
| 2023 Otopeni | Nicolò Martinenghi (ITA) | Simone Cerasuolo (ITA) | Emre Sakçı (TUR) |
| 2025 Lublin | Simone Cerasuolo (ITA) | Emre Sakçı (TUR) | Nicolò Martinenghi (ITA) |

=== 100 m breaststroke ===
| Year | Gold | Silver | Bronze |
|---|---|---|---|
| 1996 Rostock | Jens Kruppa (GER) | Patrik Isaksson (SWE) | Aleksandr Gukov (BLR) |
| 1998 Sheffield | Patrik Isaksson (SWE) | Mark Warnecke (GER) | Jens Kruppa (GER) |
| 1999 Lisbon | Roman Sloudnov (RUS) | Patrik Isaksson (SWE) | José Couto (POR) |
| 2000 Valencia | Domenico Fioravanti (ITA) | Daniel Málek (CZE) | Darren Mew (GBR) |
| 2001 Antwerp | Oleh Lisohor (UKR) | James Gibson (GBR) | Daniel Málek (CZE) |
| 2002 Riesa | Oleh Lisohor (UKR) | Hugues Duboscq (FRA) | Jarno Pihlava (FIN) |
| 2003 Dublin | James Gibson (GBR) | Oleh Lisohor (UKR) | Darren Mew (GBR) |
| 2004 Vienna | Roman Sloudnov (RUS) | Oleh Lisohor (UKR) | Ihor Borysyk (UKR) |
| 2005 Trieste | Oleh Lisohor (UKR) | Romanos Alyfantis (GRE) | Valeriy Dymo (UKR) |
| 2006 Helsinki | Oleh Lisohor (UKR) | Valeriy Dymo (UKR) | Alexander Dale Oen (NOR) |
| 2007 Debrecen | Grigory Falko (RUS) | none awarded | Mihail Aleksandrov (BUL) |
| 2007 Debrecen | Ihor Borysyk (UKR) | none awarded | Mihail Aleksandrov (BUL) |
| 2008 Rijeka | Ihor Borysyk (UKR) | Hugues Duboscq (FRA) | James Gibson (GBR) |
| 2009 Istanbul | Robin van Aggele (NED) | Dániel Gyurta (HUN) | Ihor Borysyk (UKR) |
| 2010 Eindhoven | Fabio Scozzoli (ITA) | Hendrik Feldwehr (GER) | Robin van Aggele (NED) |
| 2011 Szczecin | Alexander Dale Oen (NOR) | Damir Dugonjič (SLO) | Fabio Scozzoli (ITA) |
| 2012 Chartres | Fabio Scozzoli (ITA) | Martti Aljand (EST) | Giacomo Perez d'Ortona (FRA) |
| 2013 Herning | Dániel Gyurta (HUN) | Marco Koch (GER) | Damir Dugonjič (SVN) |
| 2015 Netanya | Marco Koch (GER) | Adam Peaty (GBR) | Giedrius Titenis (LTU) |
| 2017 Copenhagen | Adam Peaty (GBR) | Fabio Scozzoli (ITA) | Kirill Prigoda (RUS) |
| 2019 Glasgow | Arno Kamminga (NED) | Ilya Shymanovich (BLR) | Fabio Scozzoli (ITA) |
| 2021 Kazan | Nicolò Martinenghi (ITA) | Ilya Shymanovich (BLR) | Arno Kamminga (NED) |
| 2023 Otopeni | Arno Kamminga (NED) | Nicolò Martinenghi (ITA) | Caspar Corbeau (NED) |
| 2025 Lublin | Caspar Corbeau (NED) | Emre Sakçı (TUR) | Luka Mladenovic (AUT) |

=== 200 m breaststroke ===
| Year | Gold | Silver | Bronze |
|---|---|---|---|
| 1996 Rostock | Aleksandr Gukov (BLR) | Artur Paczynski (POL) | Jens Kruppa (GER) |
| 1998 Sheffield | Adam Whitehead (GBR) | Stéphan Perrot (FRA) | Maxim Podoprigora (AUT) |
| 1999 Lisbon | Stéphan Perrot (FRA) | José Couto (POR) | Adam Whitehead (GBR) |
| 2000 Valencia | Stéphan Perrot (FRA) | Domenico Fioravanti (ITA) | Daniel Málek (CZE) |
| 2001 Antwerp | Maxim Podoprigora (AUT) | Ian Edmond (GBR) | Daniel Málek (CZE) |
| 2002 Riesa | Davide Rummolo (ITA) | Maxim Podoprigora (AUT) | Richárd Bodor (HUN) |
| 2003 Dublin | Ian Edmond (GBR) | Andrew Bree (IRL) | Thijs van Valkengoed (NED) |
| 2004 Vienna | Paolo Bossini (ITA) | Sławomir Kuczko (POL) | Grigory Falko (RUS) |
| 2005 Trieste | Sławomir Kuczko (POL) | Grigory Falko (RUS) | Paolo Bossini (ITA) |
| 2006 Helsinki | Dániel Gyurta (HUN) | Sławomir Kuczko (POL) | Paolo Bossini (ITA) |
| 2007 Debrecen | Dániel Gyurta (HUN) | Paolo Bossini (ITA) | Mihail Aleksandrov (BUL) |
| 2008 Rijeka | Hugues Duboscq (FRA) | Edoardo Giorgetti (ITA) | Ihor Borysyk (UKR) |
| 2009 Istanbul | Dániel Gyurta (HUN) | Grigory Falko (RUS) | Maxim Shcherbakov (RUS) |
| 2010 Eindhoven | Marco Koch (GER) | Melquiades Alvarez (ESP) | Anton Lobanov (RUS) |
| 2011 Szczecin | Dániel Gyurta (HUN) | Vyacheslav Sinkevich (RUS) | Michael Jamieson (GBR) |
| 2012 Chartres | Viatcheslav Sinkevich (RUS) | Ihor Borysyk (UKR) | Andriy Kovalenko (UKR) |
| 2013 Herning | Dániel Gyurta (HUN) | Michael Jamieson (GBR) | Marco Koch (GER) |
| 2015 Netanya | Marco Koch (GER) | Dániel Gyurta (HUN) | Andrew Willis (GBR) |
| 2017 Copenhagen | Kirill Prigoda (RUS) | Marco Koch (GER) | Mikhail Dorinov (RUS) |
| 2019 Glasgow | Arno Kamminga (NED) | Erik Persson (SWE) | Marco Koch (GER) |
| 2021 Kazan | Ilya Shymanovich (BLR) | Arno Kamminga (NED) | Mikhail Dorinov (RUS) |
| 2023 Otopeni | Caspar Corbeau (NED) | Anton McKee (ISL) | Arno Kamminga (NED) |
| 2025 Lublin | Carles Coll (ESP) | Caspar Corbeau (NED) | Luka Mladenovic (AUT) |

=== 50 m butterfly ===
| Year | Gold | Silver | Bronze |
|---|---|---|---|
| 1991 Gelsenkirchen | Jan Karlsson (SWE) | Nils Rudolph (GER) | Vladislav Kulikov (URS) |
| 1992 Espoo | Mark Foster (GBR) | Dirk Vandenhirtz (GER) | Miloš Milošević (CRO) |
| 1993 Gateshead | Carlos Sánchez (ESP) | Jan Karlsson (SWE) | Vladimir Predkin (RUS) |
| 1994 Stavanger | Jonas Åkesson (SWE) | Carlos Sánchez (ESP) | Dirk Vandenhirtz (GER) |
| 1996 Rostock | Mark Foster (GBR) | Fabian Hieronimus (GER) | Jonas Åkesson (SWE) |
| 1998 Sheffield | Miloš Milošević (CRO) | Mark Foster (GBR) | Lars Frölander (SWE) |
| 1999 Lisbon | Miloš Milošević (CRO) | none awarded | Jere Hård (FIN) |
| 1999 Lisbon | Lars Frölander (SWE) | none awarded | Jere Hård (FIN) |
| 2000 Valencia | Mark Foster (GBR) | Jere Hård (FIN) | Jorge Luis Ulibarri (ESP) |
| 2001 Antwerp | Lars Frölander (SWE) | Mark Foster (GBR) | Tero Välimaa (FIN) |
| 2002 Riesa | Jere Hård (FIN) | Miloš Milošević (CRO) | Igor Marchenko (RUS) |
| 2003 Dublin | Mark Foster (GBR) | Alexei Puninski (CRO) | Andriy Serdinov (UKR) |
| 2004 Vienna | Mark Foster (GBR) | Jere Hård (FIN) | Oliver Wenzel (GER) |
| 2005 Trieste | Lars Frölander (SWE) | Mark Foster (GBR) | Matti Rajakylä (FIN) |
| 2006 Helsinki | Alexei Puninski (CRO) | Thomas Rupprath (GER) | Örn Arnarson (ISL) |
| 2007 Debrecen | Milorad Čavić (SRB) | Yevgeny Korotyshkin (RUS) | Johannes Dietrich (GER) |
| 2008 Rijeka | Amaury Leveaux (FRA) | Milorad Čavić (SRB) | Rafael Muñoz (ESP) |
| 2009 Istanbul | Johannes Dietrich (GER) | Frédérick Bousquet (FRA) | Yevgeny Korotyshkin (RUS) |
| 2010 Eindhoven | Steffen Deibler (GER) | Andriy Hovorov (UKR) | Joeri Verlinden (NED) |
| 2011 Szczecin | Andriy Hovorov (UKR) | Amaury Leveaux (FRA) | Konrad Czerniak (POL) |
| 2012 Chartres | Rafael Muñoz (ESP) | Frédérick Bousquet (FRA) | Andriy Hovorov (UKR) |
| 2013 Herning | Andriy Hovorov (UKR) | Steffen Deibler (GER) | Yauhen Tsurkin (BLR) |
| 2015 Netanya | Andriy Hovorov (UKR) | Yauhen Tsurkin (BLR) | Aleksandr Popkov (RUS) |
| 2017 Copenhagen | Aleksandr Popkov (RUS) | Andriy Hovorov (UKR) | Szebasztián Szabó (SRB) |
| 2017 Copenhagen | Aleksandr Popkov (RUS) | Andriy Hovorov (UKR) | Ben Proud (GBR) |
| 2019 Glasgow | Oleg Kostin (RUS) | Szebasztián Szabó (HUN) | Ümitcan Güreş (TUR) |
| 2021 Kazan | Szebasztián Szabó (HUN) | Matteo Rivolta (ITA) | Thomas Ceccon (ITA) |
| 2023 Otopeni | Noè Ponti (SUI) | Szebasztián Szabó (HUN) | Maxime Grousset (FRA) |
| 2025 Lublin | Noe Ponti (SUI) | Szebasztian Szabo (HUN) | Maxime Grousset (FRA) |

=== 100 m butterfly ===
| Year | Gold | Silver | Bronze |
|---|---|---|---|
| 1996 Rostock | Thomas Rupprath (GER) | Fabian Hieronimus (GER) | Denislav Kaltchev (BUL) |
| 1998 Sheffield | James Hickman (GBR) | Lars Frölander (SWE) | Denys Sylantyev (UKR) |
| 1999 Lisbon | Lars Frölander (SWE) | James Hickman (GBR) | Denys Sylantyev (UKR) |
| 2000 Valencia | Thomas Rupprath (GER) | Lars Frölander (SWE) | Anatoly Polyakov (RUS) |
| 2001 Antwerp | Thomas Rupprath (GER) | Lars Frölander (SWE) | James Hickman (GBR) |
| 2002 Riesa | Thomas Rupprath (GER) | Andriy Serdinov (UKR) | Igor Marchenko (RUS) |
| 2003 Dublin | Milorad Čavić (SCG) | Thomas Rupprath (GER) | Andriy Serdinov (UKR) |
| 2004 Vienna | Thomas Rupprath (GER) | Nikolay Skvortsov (RUS) | Ioan Gherghel (ROM) |
| 2005 Trieste | Thomas Rupprath (GER) | Yevgeny Korotyshkin (RUS) | Peter Mankoč (SLO) |
| 2006 Helsinki | Milorad Čavić (SRB) | Peter Mankoč (SLO) | Nikolay Skvortsov (RUS) |
| 2007 Debrecen | Milorad Čavić (SRB) | Yevgeny Korotyshkin (RUS) | Peter Mankoč (SLO) |
| 2008 Rijeka | Milorad Čavić (SRB) | Rafael Muñoz (ESP) | Nikolay Skvortsov (RUS) |
| 2009 Istanbul | Yevgeny Korotyshkin (RUS) | Peter Mankoč (SLO) | Ivan Lenđer (SRB) |
| 2010 Eindhoven | Steffen Deibler (GER) | Joeri Verlinden (NED) | Peter Mankoč (SLO) |
| 2011 Szczecin | Konrad Czerniak (POL) | Yevgeny Korotyshkin (RUS) | François Heersbrandt (BEL) |
| 2012 Chartres | Yevgeny Korotyshkin (RUS) | Rafael Muñoz (ESP) | Mehdy Metella (FRA) |
| 2013 Herning | Yevgeny Korotyshkin (RUS) | Jérémy Stravius (FRA) | Steffen Deibler (GER) |
| 2015 Netanya | László Cseh (HUN) | Matteo Rivolta (ITA) | Nikita Konovalov (RUS) |
| 2017 Copenhagen | Matteo Rivolta (ITA) | Piero Codia (ITA) | Marius Kusch (GER) |
| 2019 Glasgow | Marius Kusch (GER) | Mikhail Vekovishchev (RUS) | Marcin Cieślak (POL) |
| 2021 Kazan | Szebasztián Szabó (HUN) | Michele Lamberti (ITA) | Jakub Majerski (POL) |
| 2023 Otopeni | Noè Ponti (SUI) | Maxime Grousset (FRA) | Jacob Peters (GBR) |
| 2025 Lublin | Maxime Grousset (FRA) | Noè Ponti (SUI) | Michele Busa (ITA) |

=== 200 m butterfly ===
| Year | Gold | Silver | Bronze |
|---|---|---|---|
| 1996 Rostock | Chris-Carol Bremer (GER) | Thomas Rupprath (GER) | David Abrard (FRA) |
| 1996 Rostock | Chris-Carol Bremer (GER) | Thomas Rupprath (GER) | Adrian Andermatt (SUI) |
| 1998 Sheffield | James Hickman (GBR) | Denys Sylantyev (UKR) | Thomas Rupprath (GER) |
| 1999 Lisbon | James Hickman (GBR) | Thomas Rupprath (GER) | Denys Sylantyev (UKR) |
| 2000 Valencia | Thomas Rupprath (GER) | Anatoly Polyakov (RUS) | Stephen Parry (GBR) |
| 2001 Antwerp | James Hickman (GBR) | Denys Sylantyev (UKR) | Anatoly Polyakov (RUS) |
| 2002 Riesa | Stephen Parry (GBR) | James Hickman (GBR) | Ioan Gherghel (ROM) |
| 2003 Dublin | Franck Esposito (FRA) | Stephen Parry (GBR) | Paweł Korzeniowski (POL) |
| 2004 Vienna | Nikolay Skvortsov (RUS) | Paweł Korzeniowski (POL) | Ioan Gherghel (ROM) |
| 2005 Trieste | Paweł Korzeniowski (POL) | Helge Meeuw (GER) | Nikolay Skvortsov (RUS) |
| 2006 Helsinki | Paweł Korzeniowski (POL) | László Cseh (HUN) | Nikolay Skvortsov (RUS) |
| 2007 Debrecen | László Cseh (HUN) | Paweł Korzeniowski (POL) | Ioannis Drymonakos (GRE) |
| 2008 Rijeka | Nikolay Skvortsov (RUS) | Dinko Jukić (AUT) | Maxim Ganikhin (RUS) |
| 2009 Istanbul | Nikolay Skvortsov (RUS) | Paweł Korzeniowski (POL) | Dinko Jukić (AUT) |
| 2010 Eindhoven | Dinko Jukić (AUT) | Tim Wallburger (GER) | Bence Biczó (HUN) |
| 2011 Szczecin | László Cseh (HUN) | Nikolay Skvortsov (RUS) | Joe Roebuck (GBR) |
| 2012 Chartres | László Cseh (HUN) | Viktor Bromer (DEN) | Joeri Verlinden (NLD) |
| 2013 Herning | Velimir Stjepanović (SRB) | Paweł Korzeniowski (POL) | Nikolay Skvortsov (RUS) |
| 2015 Netanya | László Cseh (HUN) | Viktor Bromer (DEN) | Simon Sjödin (SWE) |
| 2017 Copenhagen | Aleksandr Kharlanov (RUS) | Andreas Vazaios (GRE) | Tamás Kenderesi (HUN) |
| 2019 Glasgow | Andreas Vazaios (GRE) | Ramon Klenz (GER) | James Guy (GBR) |
| 2021 Kazan | Alberto Razzetti (ITA) | Kristóf Milák (HUN) | Egor Pavlov (RUS) |
| 2023 Otopeni | Noè Ponti (SUI) | Alberto Razzetti (ITA) | Richàrd Màrton (HUN) |
| 2025 Lublin | Noe Ponti (SUI) | Krzysztof Chmielewski (POL) | Michał Chmielewski (POL) |

=== 100 m individual medley ===
| Year | Gold | Silver | Bronze |
|---|---|---|---|
| 1991 Gelsenkirchen | Josef Hladký (CZE) | Ron Dekker (NED) | Indrek Sei (EST) |
| 1992 Espoo | Jani Sievinen (FIN) | Antti Kasvio (FIN) | Indrek Sei (EST) |
| 1993 Gateshead | Ron Dekker (NED) | Indrek Sei (EST) | Christian Keller (GER) |
| 1994 Stavanger | Denislav Kaltchev (BUL) | Christian Keller (GER) | Grigory Matuskov (RUS) |
| 1996 Rostock | Marcel Wouda (NED) | Jens Kruppa (GER) | Christian Keller (GER) |
| 1998 Sheffield | Jani Sievinen (FIN) | Jens Kruppa (GER) | James Hickman (GBR) |
| 1999 Lisbon | Jens Kruppa (GER) | Peter Mankoč (SLO) | Marcel Wouda (NED) |
| 2000 Valencia | Peter Mankoč (SLO) | Indrek Sei (EST) | Davide Cassol (ITA) |
| 2001 Antwerp | Peter Mankoč (SLO) | Jens Kruppa (GER) | Jani Sievinen (FIN) |
| 2002 Riesa | Peter Mankoč (SLO) | Jani Sievinen (FIN) | Oleh Lisohor (UKR) |
| 2003 Dublin | Peter Mankoč (SLO) | none awarded | Marco de Carli (GER) |
| 2003 Dublin | Jani Sievinen (FIN) | none awarded | Marco de Carli (GER) |
| 2004 Vienna | Peter Mankoč (SLO) | Markus Rogan (AUT) | Oliver Wenzel (GER) |
| 2005 Trieste | Peter Mankoč (SLO) | Oleh Lisohor (UKR) | Vytautas Janušaitis (LTU) |
| 2006 Helsinki | Peter Mankoč (SLO) | Vytautas Janušaitis (LTU) | Aleksander Hetland (NOR) |
| 2007 Debrecen | Peter Mankoč (SLO) | Thomas Rupprath (GER) | Sergey Fesikov (RUS) |
| 2008 Rijeka | Peter Mankoč (SLO) | Christian Galenda (ITA) | James Goddard (GBR) |
| 2009 Istanbul | Duje Draganja (CRO) | Sergey Fesikov (RUS) | Peter Mankoč (SLO) |
| 2010 Eindhoven | Markus Deibler (GER) | Peter Mankoč (SLO) | Alan Cabello (ESP) |
| 2011 Szczecin | Peter Mankoč (SLO) | Markus Deibler (GER) | Martti Aljand (EST) |
| 2012 Chartres | Vladimir Morozov (RUS) | Peter Mankoč (SLO) | Martti Aljand (EST) |
| 2013 Herning | Vladimir Morozov (RUS) | Sergey Fesikov (RUS) | Stefano Pizzamiglio (ITA) |
| 2015 Netanya | Sergey Fesikov (RUS) | Yakov Toumarkin (ISR) | Andreas Vazaios (GRE) |
| 2017 Copenhagen | Marco Orsi (ITA) | Sergey Fesikov (RUS) | Kyle Stolk (NED) |
| 2019 Glasgow | Kliment Kolesnikov (RUS) | Sergey Fesikov (RUS) | Andreas Vazaios (GRE) |
| 2021 Kazan | Marco Orsi (ITA) | Andreas Vazaios (GRE) | Bernhard Reitshammer (AUT) |
| 2023 Otopeni | Bernhard Reitshammer (AUT) | Noè Ponti (SUI) | Andreas Vazaios (GRE) |
| 2025 Lublin | Noe Ponti (SUI) | Maxime Grousset (FRA) | Heiko Gigler (AUT) |

=== 200 m individual medley ===
| Year | Gold | Silver | Bronze |
|---|---|---|---|
| 1996 Rostock | Marcel Wouda (NED) | Christian Keller (GER) | Krešimir Čač (CRO) |
| 1998 Sheffield | James Hickman (GBR) | Marcel Wouda (NED) | Jani Sievinen (FIN) |
| 1999 Lisbon | Marcel Wouda (NED) | Jirka Letzin (GER) | Massimiliano Rossolino (ITA) |
| 2000 Valencia | Massimiliano Rossolino (ITA) | Christian Keller (GER) | Peter Mankoč (SLO) |
| 2001 Antwerp | Peter Mankoč (SLO) | Jani Sievinen (FIN) | Alessio Boggiatto (ITA) |
| 2002 Riesa | Jani Sievinen (FIN) | Tamás Kerékjártó (HUN) | Peter Mankoč (SLO) |
| 2003 Dublin | Jani Sievinen (FIN) | Massimiliano Rossolino (ITA) | Peter Mankoč (SLO) |
| 2004 Vienna | Markus Rogan (AUT) | László Cseh (HUN) | Vytautas Janušaitis (LTU) |
| 2005 Trieste | László Cseh (HUN) | Vytautas Janušaitis (LTU) | Alessio Boggiatto (ITA) |
| 2006 Helsinki | László Cseh (HUN) | Vytautas Janušaitis (LTU) | Tamás Kerékjártó (HUN) |
| 2007 Debrecen | László Cseh (HUN) | Saša Imprić (CRO) | Alexander Tikhonov (RUS) |
| 2008 Rijeka | James Goddard (GBR) | Vytautas Janušaitis (LTU) | Alan Cabello (ESP) |
| 2009 Istanbul | Markus Rogan (AUT) | Vytautas Janušaitis (LTU) | Alan Cabello (ESP) |
| 2010 Eindhoven | Markus Deibler (GER) | Vytautas Janušaitis (LTU) | Dinko Jukić (AUT) |
| 2011 Szczecin | László Cseh (HUN) | Markus Rogan (AUT) | Gal Nevo (ISR) |
| 2012 Chartres | László Cseh (HUN) | Jérémy Stravius (FRA) | Gal Nevo (ISR) |
| 2013 Herning | Philip Heintz (GER) | Simon Sjödin (SWE) | Diogo Carvalho (POR) |
| 2015 Netanya | László Cseh (HUN) | Philip Heintz (GER) | Diogo Carvalho (POR) |
| 2017 Copenhagen | Philip Heintz (GER) | Andreas Vazaios (GRE) | Tomoe Hvas (NOR) |
| 2019 Glasgow | Andreas Vazaios (GRE) | Tomoe Hvas (NOR) | Philip Heintz (GER) |
| 2021 Kazan | Andreas Vazaios (GRE) | Thomas Ceccon (ITA) | Alberto Razzetti (ITA) |
| 2023 Otopeni | Duncan Scott (GBR) | Alberto Razzetti (ITA) | Danas Rapšys (LTU) |
| 2025 Lublin | Hugo González (ESP) | Alberto Razzetti (ITA) | Berke Saka (TUR) |

=== 400 m individual medley ===
| Year | Gold | Silver | Bronze |
|---|---|---|---|
| 1996 Rostock | Marcel Wouda (NED) | Christian Keller (GER) | Uwe Volk (GER) |
| 1998 Sheffield | Marcel Wouda (NED) | Frederik Hviid (ESP) | Christian Keller (GER) |
| 1999 Lisbon | Frederik Hviid (ESP) | Jirka Letzin (GER) | Michael Halika (ISR) |
| 2000 Valencia | Alessio Boggiatto (ITA) | Frederik Hviid (ESP) | Michael Halika (ISR) |
| 2001 Antwerp | Alessio Boggiatto (ITA) | Robin Francis (GBR) | Jacob Carstensen (DEN) |
| 2002 Riesa | Alessio Boggiatto (ITA) | Jacob Carstensen (DEN) | László Cseh (HUN) |
| 2003 Dublin | László Cseh (HUN) | Robin Francis (GBR) | Massimiliano Rossolino (ITA) |
| 2004 Vienna | László Cseh (HUN) | Luca Marin (ITA) | Igor Berezutsky (RUS) |
| 2005 Trieste | László Cseh (HUN) | Luca Marin (ITA) | Alessio Boggiatto (ITA) |
| 2006 Helsinki | Luca Marin (ITA) | László Cseh (HUN) | Ioannis Drymonakos (GRE) |
| 2007 Debrecen | László Cseh (HUN) | Luca Marin (ITA) | Ioannis Drymonakos (GRE) |
| 2008 Rijeka | Dinko Jukić (AUT) | Gergő Kis (HUN) | Lukasz Wojt (POL) |
| 2009 Istanbul | László Cseh (HUN) | Dávid Verrasztó (HUN) | Gal Nevo (ISR) |
| 2010 Eindhoven | Dávid Verrasztó (HUN) | Yannick Lebherz (GER) | Federico Turrini (ITA) |
| 2011 Szczecin | László Cseh (HUN) | Dávid Verrasztó (HUN) | Gal Nevo (ISR) |
| 2012 Chartres | László Cseh (HUN) | Dávid Verrasztó (HUN) | Gal Nevo (ISR) |
| 2013 Herning | Dávid Verrasztó (HUN) | Gal Nevo (ISR) | Federico Turrini (ITA) |
| 2015 Netanya | Dávid Verrasztó (HUN) | Roberto Pavoni (GBR) | Gal Nevo (ISR) |
| 2017 Copenhagen | Péter Bernek (HUN) | Philip Heintz (GER) | Gergely Gyurta (HUN) |
| 2019 Glasgow | Max Litchfield (GBR) | Ilya Borodin (RUS) | Daniil Pasynkov (RUS) |
| 2021 Kazan | Ilya Borodin (RUS) | Alberto Razzetti (ITA) | Hubert Kós (HUN) |
| 2023 Otopeni | Alberto Razzetti (ITA) | Duncan Scott (GBR) | Apostolos Papastamos (GRE) |
| 2025 Lublin | Alberto Razzetti (ITA) | Max Litchfield (GBR) | Cedric Bussing (GER) |

=== 4 × 50 metre freestyle relay ===
| Year | Gold | Silver | Bronze |
|---|---|---|---|
| 1991 Gelsenkirchen | Germany (GER) | Soviet Union (URS) | Great Britain (GBR) |
| 1992 Espoo | Sweden (SWE) | Germany (GER) | Russia (RUS) |
| 1993 Gateshead | Sweden (SWE); Christer Wallin; Pär Lindström; Joakim Holmqvist; Zsolt Hegmegi | Germany (GER); Silko Günzel; Axel Hickmann; Torsten Spanneberg; Ingolf Rasch | Croatia (CRO); Miloš Milošević; Marijan Kanjer; Alen Loncar; Miroslav Vucetic |
| 1994 Stavanger | Sweden (SWE) | Germany (GER) | Croatia (CRO) |
| 1996 Rostock | Germany (GER); Lars Conrad; Christian Tröger; Tim Nolte; Steffen Smöllich | Croatia (CRO); Tomislav Karlo; Miloš Milošević; Miro Žeravica; Alen Lončar | Norway (NOR); Anders Dahl; Vermund Vetnes; Thomas Sopp; Thomas Nore |
| 1998 Sheffield | Netherlands (NED); Mark Veens; Johan Kenkhuis; Stefan Aartsen; Pieter van den Hoogenband | Great Britain (GBR); Mark Foster; James Hickman; Simon Handley; Sion Brinn | Germany (GER); Stephan Kunzelmann; Lars Conrad; Alexander Lüderitz; Carsten Dehmlow |
| 1999 Lisbon | Sweden (SWE); Claes Andersson; Lars Frölander; Stefan Nystrand; Daniel Carlsson | Germany (GER); Mitja Zastrow; Alexander Lüderitz; Stephan Kunzelmann; Kai Hanschmann | Netherlands (NED); Dennis Rijnbeek; Stefan Aartsen; Marcel Wouda; Pieter van den Hoogenband |
| 2000 Valencia | Sweden (SWE); Joakim Dahl; Stefan Nystrand; Lars Frölander; Claes Andersson | Germany (GER); Thomas Winkler; Stephan Kunzelmann; Stefan Herbst; Sven Guske | Great Britain (GBR); Anthony Howard; Mark Foster; Stephen Parry; Matthew Kidd |
| 2001 Antwerp | Ukraine (UKR); Denys Sylantyev; Oleksandr Volynets; Oleh Lisohor; Vyacheslav Shyrshov | Netherlands (NED); Johan Kenkhuis; Gijs Damen; Ewout Holst; Pieter van den Hoogenband | Sweden (SWE); Erik Dorch; Stefan Nystrand; Lars Frölander; Jonas Tilly |
| 2002 Riesa | Netherlands (NED); Johan Kenkhuis; Gijs Damen; Ewout Holst; Mark Veens | Italy (ITA); Lorenzo Vismara; Christian Galenda; Michele Scarica; Domenico Fioravanti | Ukraine (UKR); Denys Sylantyev; Oleksandr Volynets; Oleh Lisohor; Vyacheslav Shyrshov |
| 2003 Dublin | Netherlands (NED); Mark Veens; Johan Kenkhuis; Gijs Damen; Pieter van den Hoogenband | Germany (GER); Carsten Dehmlow; Benjamin Friedrich; Fabian Friedrich; Jens Schreiber | Ukraine (UKR); Vyacheslav Shyrshov; Yuriy Yegoshin; Oleh Lisohor; Oleksandr Volynets |
| 2004 Vienna | France (FRA); David Maitre; Alain Bernard; Romain Barnier; Frédérick Bousquet | Germany (GER); Benjamin Friedrich; Thomas Rupprath; Jens Schreiber; Carsten Dehmlow | Sweden (SWE); David Nordenlilja; Marcus Piehl; Erik Andersson; Petter Stymne |
| 2005 Trieste | Netherlands (NED); Mark Veens; Mitja Zastrow; Gijs Damen; Johan Kenkhuis | France (FRA); Julien Sicot; David Maitre; Alain Bernard; Frédérick Bousquet | Great Britain (GBR); Mark Foster; Liam Tancock; Chris Cozens; Anthony Howard |
| 2006 Helsinki | Sweden (SWE); Stefan Nystrand; Petter Stymne; Marcus Piehl; Jonas Tilly | France (FRA); Frédérick Bousquet; Julien Sicot; David Maitre; Alain Bernard | Netherlands (NED); Johan Kenkhuis; Bas van Velthoven; Robin van Aggele; Mitja Zastrow |
| 2007 Debrecen | Sweden (SWE); Petter Stymne; Marcus Piehl; Per Nylin; Stefan Nystrand | France (FRA); Antoine Galavtine; Alain Bernard; David Maitre; Amaury Leveaux | Germany (GER); Steffen Deibler; Stefan Herbst; Johannes Dietrich; Thomas Rupprath |
| 2008 Rijeka | France (FRA); Alain Bernard; Fabien Gilot; Amaury Leveaux; Frédérick Bousquet | Italy (ITA); Alessandro Calvi; Marco Orsi; Mattia Nalesso; Filippo Magnini | Croatia (CRO); Duje Draganja; Alexei Puninski; Bruno Barbic; Mario Todorović |
| 2009 Istanbul | France (FRA); Amaury Leveaux; Jérémy Stravius; David Maitre; Frédérick Bousquet | Croatia (CRO); Duje Draganja; Alexei Puninski; Mario Todorović; Mario Delač | Italy (ITA); Marco Orsi; Federico Bocchia; Filippo Magnini; Luca Dotto |
| 2010 Eindhoven | Italy (ITA); Luca Dotto; Lucio Spadaro; Filippo Magnini; Marco Orsi | Germany (GER); Steffen Deibler; Markus Deibler; Stefan Herbst; Christoph Fildebrandt | Russia (RUS); Danila Izotov; Evgeny Lagunov; Vitaly Syrnikov; Vladimir Bryukhov |
| 2011 Szczecin | Italy (ITA); Luca Dotto; Marco Orsi; Federico Bocchia; Andrea Rolla | Russia (RUS); Sergey Fesikov; Yevgeny Lagunov; Andrey Grechin; Nikita Konovalov | Belgium (BEL); François Heersbrandt; Emmanuel Vanluchene; Louis Croenen; Jasper Aerents |
| 2012 Chartres | France (FRA); Florent Manaudou; Frédérick Bousquet; Jérémy Stravius; Amaury Leveaux | Russia (RUS); Vladimir Morozov; Andrey Grechin; Yevgeny Lagunov; Vitaly Syrnikov | Belgium (BEL); Emmanuel Vanluchene; Pieter Timmers; Yoris Grandjean; Jasper Aerents |
| 2013 Herning | Russia (RUS); Vladimir Morozov; Sergey Fesikov; Yevgeny Lagunov; Nikita Konovalov | Italy (ITA); Luca Dotto; Federico Bocchia; Filippo Magnini; Marco Orsi | Belgium (BEL); Jasper Aerents; Pieter Timmers; François Heersbrandt; Yoris Grandjean |
| 2015 Netanya | Russia (RUS); Evgeny Sedov; Andrey Arbuzov; Aleksandr Kliukin; Nikita Konovalov | Italy (ITA); Federico Bocchia; Marco Orsi; Giuseppe Guttuso; Filippo Magnini | Belarus (BLR); Yauhen Tsurkin; Anton Latkin; Viktar Staselovich; Artyom Machekin |
| 2017 Copenhagen | Russia (RUS); Kliment Kolesnikov; Vladimir Morozov; Sergey Fesikov; Mikhail Vekovishchev | Italy (ITA); Luca Dotto; Lorenzo Zazzeri; Alessandro Miressi; Marco Orsi | Poland (POL); Paweł Juraszek; Filip Wypych; Jakub Książek; Konrad Czerniak |
| 2019 Glasgow | Russia (RUS); Vladislav Grinev; Mikhail Vekovishchev; Kliment Kolesnikov; Vladimir Morozov | Poland (POL); Paweł Juraszek; Marcin Cieślak; Karol Ostrowski; Jakub Kraska | Italy (ITA); Federico Bocchia; Marco Orsi; Giovanni Izzo; Alessandro Miressi |
| 2021 Kazan | Netherlands (NED); Jesse Puts; Stan Pijnenburg; Kenzo Simons; Thom de Boer | Italy (ITA); Alessandro Miressi; Thomas Ceccon; Lorenzo Zazzeri; Marco Orsi | Russia (RUS); Vladimir Morozov; Vladislav Grinev; Evgeny Rylov; Kliment Kolesnikov |
| 2023 Otopeni | Great Britain (GBR); Benjamin Proud; Matt Richards; Alexander Cohoon; Lewis Burras | Italy (ITA); Leonardo Deplano; Lorenzo Zazzeri; Thomas Ceccon; Alessandro Miressi | Greece (GRE); Kristian Gkolomeev; Stergios Marios Bilas; Apostolos Christou; Andreas Vazaios |
| 2025 Lublin | Italy; Leonardo Deplano; Lorenzo Zazzeri; Giovanni Guatti; Thomas Ceccon; Carlos D'Ambrosio; Manuel Frigo | Poland; Piotr Ludwiczak; Ksawery Masiuk; Kamil Sieradzki; Mateusz Chowaniec | Croatia; Jere Hribar; Nikola Miljenic; Božo Puhalović; Luka Cvetko |

=== 4 × 50 metre medley relay ===
| Year | Gold | Silver | Bronze |
|---|---|---|---|
| 1991 Gelsenkirchen | Soviet Union (URS) | Germany (GER) | Italy (ITA) |
| 1992 Espoo | Finland (FIN) | Sweden (SWE) | Russia (RUS) |
| 1993 Gateshead | Sweden (SWE); Zsolt Hegmegi; Peter Haraldsson; Jan Karlsson; Joakim Holmqvist | Russia (RUS) | Germany (GER); Patrick Hermanspann; Mark Warnecke; Dirk Vandenhirtz; Silko Günzel |
| 1994 Stavanger | Germany (GER) | Sweden (SWE) | Croatia (CRO) |
| 1996 Rostock | Germany (GER); Stev Theloke; Jens Kruppa; Fabian Hieronimus; Lars Conrad | Italy (ITA); Emanuele Merisi; Domenico Fioravanti; Luca Belfiore; René Gusperti | Great Britain (GBR); Neil Willey; Richard Maden; Mark Foster; Simon Handley |
| 1998 Sheffield | Germany (GER); Thomas Rupprath; Mark Warnecke; Alexander Lüderitz; Stephan Kunzelmann; Sweden (SWE); Daniel Carlsson; Patrik Isaksson; Jonas Åkesson; Lars Frölander | none awarded | Great Britain (GBR); James Hickman; Darren Mew; Mark Foster; Sion Brinn |
| 1999 Lisbon | Sweden (SWE); Daniel Carlsson; Patrik Isaksson; Lars Frölander; Stefan Nystrand | Germany (GER); Sebastian Halgasch; Mark Warnecke; Thomas Rupprath; Alexander Lüderitz | Great Britain (GBR); Neil Willey; Darren Mew; James Hickman; Mark Foster |
| 2000 Valencia | Germany (GER); Sebastian Halgasch; Mark Warnecke; Thomas Rupprath; Thomas Winkler | Ukraine (UKR); Volodymyr Nikolaychuk; Oleh Lisohor; Andriy Serdinov; Oleksandr Volynets | Croatia (CRO); Ante Mašković; Vanja Rogulj; Tomislav Karlo; Duje Draganja |
| 2001 Antwerp | Germany (GER); Stev Theloke; Mark Warnecke; Thomas Rupprath; Carsten Dehmlow | Great Britain (GBR); Gregor Tait; James Gibson; James Hickman; Mark Foster | Sweden (SWE); Jens Petterson; Patrik Isaksson; Lars Frölander; Stefan Nystrand |
| 2002 Riesa | Germany (GER); Stev Theloke; Jens Kruppa; Thomas Rupprath; Carsten Dehmlow | Finland (FIN); Jani Sievinen; Jarno Pihlava; Tero Välimaa; Jere Hård | Ukraine (UKR); Vyacheslav Shyrshov; Oleh Lisohor; Andriy Serdinov; Oleksandr Volynets |
| 2003 Dublin | Germany (GER); Thomas Rupprath; Mark Warnecke; Fabian Friedrich; Carsten Dehmlow | Sweden (SWE); Jens Petterson; Martin Gustavsson; Björn Lundin; Stefan Nystrand | Switzerland (SUI); Flori Lang; Remo Lütolf; Lorenz Liechti; Karel Novy |
| 2004 Vienna | Germany (GER); Thomas Rupprath; Mark Warnecke; Fabian Friedrich; Carsten Dehmlow | Ukraine (UKR); Vyacheslav Shyrshov; Oleh Lisohor; Sergiy Breus; Oleksandr Volynets | Finland (FIN); Tero Raty; Jarno Pihlava; Jere Hård; Matti Rajakylä |
| 2005 Trieste | Germany (GER); Thomas Rupprath; Mark Warnecke; Johannes Dietrich; Steffen Deibler | Ukraine (UKR); Andriy Oleynik; Oleh Lisohor; Sergiy Breus; Vyacheslav Shyrshov | Great Britain (GBR); Liam Tancock; Chris Cook; Matthew Clay; Mark Foster |
| 2006 Helsinki | Germany (GER); Helge Meeuw; Johannes Neumann; Thomas Rupprath; Jens Schreiber | Finland (FIN); Tero Raty; Jarno Pihlava; Jere Hård; Matti Rajakylä | Italy (ITA); Cesare Pizzirani; Alessandro Terrin; Rudy Goldin; Filippo Magnini |
| 2007 Debrecen | Germany (GER); Thomas Rupprath; Markus Deibler; Johannes Dietrich; Steffen Deibler | Russia (RUS); Stanislav Donets; Dimitry Komornikov; Yevgeny Korotyshkin; Sergey Fesikov | Netherlands (NED); Nick Driebergen; Robin van Aggele; Bastiaan Tamminga; Mitja Zastrow |
| 2008 Rijeka | Italy (ITA); Mirco di Tora; Alessandro Terrin; Marco Belotti; Filippo Magnini | Russia (RUS); Stanislav Donets; Sergey Geybel; Yevgeny Korotyshkin; Yevgeny Lagunov | none awarded |
| 2008 Rijeka | Italy (ITA); Mirco di Tora; Alessandro Terrin; Marco Belotti; Filippo Magnini | Germany (GER); Thomas Rupprath; Marco Koch; Johannes Dietrich; Steffen Deibler | none awarded |
| 2009 Istanbul | Russia (RUS); Stanislav Donets; Sergey Geybel; Yevgeny Korotyshkin; Sergey Fesikov | Germany (GER); Thomas Rupprath; Hendrik Feldwehr; Johannes Dietrich; Stefan Herbst | France (FRA); Benjamin Stasiulis; Hugues Duboscq; Frédérick Bousquet; Amaury Leveaux |
| 2010 Eindhoven | Germany (GER); Stefan Herbst; Hendrik Feldwehr; Steffen Deibler; Markus Deibler | Italy (ITA); Mirco di Tora; Fabio Scozzoli; Paolo Facchinelli; Marco Orsi | Russia (RUS); Stanislav Donets; Sergey Geybel; Nikolay Skvortsov; Danila Izotov |
| 2011 Szczecin | Italy (ITA); Mirco di Tora; Fabio Scozzoli; Paolo Facchinelli; Marco Orsi | Russia (RUS); Vitaly Borisov; Sergey Geybel; Yevgeny Korotyshkin; Sergey Fesikov | Germany (GER); Christian Diener; Erik Steinhagen; Steffen Deibler; Stefan Herbst |
| 2012 Chartres | France (FRA); Jérémy Stravius; Giacomo Perez d'Ortona; Frédérick Bousquet; Florent Manaudou | Russia (RUS); Vladimir Morozov; Oleg Utekhin; Yevgeny Korotyshkin; Evgeny Lagunov | Czech Republic (CZE); Martin Baďura; Petr Bartůněk; Michal Ledl; Tomáš Plevko |
| 2013 Herning | Italy (ITA); Stefano Pizzamiglio; Francesco Di Lecce; Piero Codia; Marco Orsi | Germany (GER); Christian Diener; Hendrik Feldwehr; Steffen Deibler; Maximilian Oswald | Belarus (BLR); Pavel Sankovich; Yury Klemparski; Yauhen Tsurkin; Artyom Machekin |
| 2015 Netanya | Italy (ITA); Simone Sabbioni; Fabio Scozzoli; Matteo Rivolta; Marco Orsi | Russia (RUS); Andrei Shabasov; Oleg Kostin; Aleksandr Popkov; Evgeny Sedov | Belarus (BLR); Pavel Sankovich; Ilya Shymanovich; Yauhen Tsurkin; Anton Latkin |
| 2017 Copenhagen | Russia (RUS); Kliment Kolesnikov; Kirill Prigoda; Aleksandr Popkov; Vladimir Morozov | Italy (ITA); Simone Sabbioni; Fabio Scozzoli; Piero Codia; Luca Dotto | Belarus (BLR); Pavel Sankovich; Ilya Shymanovich; Yauhen Tsurkin; Anton Latkin |
| 2019 Glasgow | Russia (RUS); Kliment Kolesnikov; Vladimir Morozov; Oleg Kostin; Vladislav Grinev | Hungary (HUN); Richárd Bohus; Dávid Horváth; Szebasztián Szabó; Maksim Lobanovskij | Belarus (BLR); Viktar Staselovich; Ilya Shymanovich; Yauhen Tsurkin; Artsiom Machekin |
| 2021 Kazan | Italy (ITA); Michele Lamberti; Nicolo Martinenghi; Marco Orsi; Lorenzo Zazzeri | Russia (RUS); Kliment Kolesnikov; Oleg Kostin; Vladimir Morozov; Vladislav Grinev | Netherlands (NED); Stan Pijnenburg; Arno Kamminga; Jesse Puts; Thom de Boer |
| 2023 Otopeni | Italy (ITA); Lorenzo Mora; Nicolo Martinenghi; Thomas Ceccon; Lorenzo Zazzeri | Great Britain (GBR); Oliver Morgan; Archie Goodburn; Jacob Peters; Matt Richards | Netherlands (NED); Jesse Puts; Caspar Corbeau; Sean Niewold; Kenzo Simons |
| 2025 Lublin | Italy, Francesco Lazzari; Simone Cerasuolo; Simone Stefanì; Leonardo Deplano; Lorenzo Mora; Ludovico Viberti; Michele Busa; Lorenzo Zazzeri | France; Mewen Tomac; Jérémie Delbois; Clement Secchi; Maxime Grousset; Lucien Vergnes; Yohann Ndoye-Brouard | Spain; Iván Martínez Sota; Carles Coll; Hugo González; Sergio de Celis; Eudald Tarrats Vilaro |

=== 4 × 50 metre mixed freestyle relay ===
Each team consists of two men and two women, in any order.

| Year | Gold | Silver | Bronze |
|---|---|---|---|
| 2012 Chartres | France; Frédérick Bousquet; Florent Manaudou; Camille Muffat; Anna Santamans | Russia; Andrey Grechin; Vladimir Morozov; Veronika Popova; Rozaliya Nasretdinova | Finland; Hanna-Maria Seppälä; Laura Kurki; Andrei Tuomola; Ari-Pekka Liukkonen |
| 2013 Herning | Russia; Sergey Fesikov; Vladimir Morozov; Rozaliya Nasretdinova; Veronika Popova | Italy; Luca Dotto; Marco Orsi; Silvia Di Pietro; Erika Ferraioli | Netherlands; Inge Dekker; Joost Reijns; Sebastiaan Verschuren; Ranomi Kromowidjojo |
| 2015 Netanya | Italy; Federico Bocchia; Marco Orsi; Silvia Di Pietro; Erika Ferraioli | Russia; Evgeny Sedov; Nikita Konovalov; Natalia Lovtcova; Rozaliya Nasretdinova | Netherlands; Jesse Puts; Ben Schwietert; Inge Dekker; Ranomi Kromowidjojo |
| 2017 Copenhagen | Netherlands; Nyls Korstanje; Kyle Stolk; Ranomi Kromowidjojo; Femke Heemskerk | Russia; Vladimir Morozov; Sergey Fesikov; Maria Kameneva; Rozaliya Nasretdinova | Italy; Luca Dotto; Marco Orsi; Federica Pellegrini; Erika Ferraioli |
| 2019 Glasgow | Russia; Vladimir Morozov; Vladislav Grinev; Arina Surkova; Maria Kameneva | Great Britain; Duncan Scott; Scott McLay; Anna Hopkin; Freya Anderson | France; Maxime Grousset; Florent Manaudou; Melanie Henique; Béryl Gastaldello |
| 2021 Kazan | Netherlands; Jesse Puts; Thom de Boer; Maaike de Waard; Kim Busch | Italy; Alessandro Miressi; Lorenzo Zazzeri; Silvia Di Pietro; Costanza Cocconcelli | Poland; Paweł Juraszek; Jakub Majerski; Alicja Tchórz; Katarzyna Wasick |
| 2023 Otopeni | Great Britain; Ben Proud; Lewis Burras; Anna Hopkin; Freya Anderson | Italy; Alessandro Miressi; Lorenzo Zazzeri; Jasmine Nocentini; Silvia Di Pietro | France; Maxime Grousset; Florent Manaudou; Melanie Henique; Béryl Gastaldello |
| 2025 Lublin | Italy; Leonardo Deplano; Lorenzo Zazzeri; Silvia Di Pietro; Sara Curtis; Giovanni Guatti; Agata Ambler | Hungary; Szebasztián Szabó; Ádám Jászó; Petra Senánszky; Minna Ábrahám; Nándor Németh; Panna Ugrai | Netherlands; Brandon van den Berg; Sean Niewold; Marrit Steenbergen; Valerie van Roon; Kenzo Simons; Tessa Giele; Milou van Wijk |

=== 4 × 50 metre mixed medley relay ===
Each team consists of two men and two women, in any order.

| Year | Gold | Silver | Bronze |
|---|---|---|---|
| 2012 Chartres | France; Jérémy Stravius; Florent Manaudou; Mélanie Henique; Anna Santamans | Slovenia; Anja Čarman; Damir Dugonjič; Peter Mankoč; Nastja Govejšek | Norway; Lavrans Solli; Aleksander Hetland; Monica Johannessen; Cecilie Johannessen |
| 2013 Herning | Germany; Christian Diener; Caroline Ruhnau; Steffen Deibler; Dorothea Brandt | Czech Republic; Simona Baumrtová; Petr Bartůněk; Lucie Svěcená; Tomáš Plevko | Italy; Niccolò Bonacchi; Francesco Di Lecce; Ilaria Bianchi; Erika Ferraioli |
| 2015 Netanya | Italy; Simone Sabbioni; Fabio Scozzoli; Silvia Di Pietro; Erika Ferraioli | Russia; Andrei Shabasov; Andrei Nikolaev; Alina Kashinskaya; Rozaliya Nasretdinova | Belarus; Pavel Sankovich; Ilya Shymanovich; Sviatlana Khakhlova; Aleksandra Gerasimenya |
| 2017 Copenhagen | Netherlands; Kira Toussaint; Arno Kamminga; Joeri Verlinden; Ranomi Kromowidjojo | Belarus; Pavel Sankovich; Ilya Shymanovich; Anastasiya Shkurdai; Yuliya Khitraya | France; Jérémy Stravius; Theo Bussiere; Mélanie Henique; Charlotte Bonnet |
| 2019 Glasgow | Russia; Kliment Kolesnikov; Vladimir Morozov; Arina Surkova; Maria Kameneva | Netherlands; Kira Toussaint; Arno Kamminga; Joeri Verlinden; Femke Heemskerk | Denmark; Mathias Rysgaard; Tobias Bjerg; Jeanette Ottesen; Pernille Blume |
| 2021 Kazan | Netherlands; Kira Toussaint; Arno Kamminga; Maaike de Waard; Thom de Boer | Italy; Michele Lamberti; Nicolò Martinenghi; Elena Di Liddo; Silvia Di Pietro | Russia; Kliment Kolesnikov; Oleg Kostin; Arina Surkova; Maria Kameneva |
| 2023 Otopeni | Italy; Lorenzo Mora; Nicolò Martinenghi; Silvia Di Pietro; Jasmine Nocentini | Russia; Mewen Tomac; Florent Manaudou; Beryl Gastaldello; Charlotte Bonnet | Netherlands; Kira Toussaint; Caspar Corbeau; Tessa Giele; Kenzo Simons |
| 2025 Lublin | Italy; Francesco Lazzari; Simone Cerasuolo; Silvia di Pietro; Sara Curtis; Ludovico Blu Art Viberti; Costanza Cocconcelli; Agata Ambler | Netherlands; Maaike de Waard; Jason van den Berg; Sean Niewold; Valerie van Roon; Marrit Steenbergen | Poland; Aleksander Styś; Jan Kalusowski; Kornelia Fiedkiewicz; Julia Maik; Katarzyna Wasick |

== Discontinued events ==
Only at the European Sprint Swimming Championships 1993 in Gateshead, 4 × 50 m relays were held in every stroke.

=== 4 × 50 metre backstroke relay ===
| Year | Gold | Silver | Bronze |
|---|---|---|---|
| 1993 Gateshead | Germany | Great Britain | none awarded |

=== 4 × 50 metre breaststroke relay ===
| Year | Gold | Silver | Bronze |
|---|---|---|---|
| 1993 Gateshead | Germany | Great Britain | none awarded |

=== 4 × 50 metre butterfly relay ===
| Year | Gold | Silver | Bronze |
|---|---|---|---|
| 1993 Gateshead | Sweden | Germany | Great Britain |

== See also ==
- List of European Short Course Swimming Championships medalists (women)
