= Mette Jacobsen =

Danish swimmer (born 1973)

Personal information
- Nationality: Danish
- Born: 24 March 1973 (age 53) Nakskov, Denmark
- Height: 1.70 m (5 ft 7 in)
- Weight: 62 kg (137 lb)

Sport
- Sport: Swimming
- Strokes: Freestyle, butterfly, backstroke
- Club: Nakskov SK
Medal record
World Championships (LC)
Bronze medal – third place	1991 Perth	200 m freestyle
Bronze medal – third place	1991 Perth	4×200 m freestyle
World Championships (SC)
Gold medal – first place	1995 Rio de Janeiro	200 m backstroke
Gold medal – first place	1999 Hong Kong	200 m butterfly
Gold medal – first place	2000 Athens	200 m butterfly
Silver medal – second place	1995 Rio de Janeiro	100 m backstroke
Bronze medal – third place	1995 Rio de Janeiro	200 m butterfly
European Championships (LC)
Gold medal – first place	1991 Athens	200 m freestyle
Gold medal – first place	1991 Athens	200 m butterfly
Gold medal – first place	1991 Athens	4×200 m freestyle
Gold medal – first place	1995 Vienna	100 m backstroke
Gold medal – first place	1995 Vienna	100 m butterfly
Gold medal – first place	1997 Seville	100 m butterfly
Gold medal – first place	1999 Istanbul	200 m butterfly
Silver medal – second place	1995 Vienna	100 m freestyle
Silver medal – second place	1995 Vienna	200 m butterfly
Silver medal – second place	2000 Helsinki	200 m butterfly
Bronze medal – third place	1989 Bonn	200 m freestyle
Bronze medal – third place	1989 Bonn	200 m butterfly
Bronze medal – third place	1991 Athens	4×100 m freestyle
Bronze medal – third place	1995 Vienna	200 m freestyle
Bronze medal – third place	1997 Seville	200 m butterfly
Bronze medal – third place	1997 Seville	4×200 m freestyle
Bronze medal – third place	2000 Helsinki	100 m freestyle
Bronze medal – third place	2004 Madrid	200 m butterfly
European Championships (SC)
Gold medal – first place	1999 Lisbon	200 m butterfly
Silver medal – second place	1998 Sheffield	200 m butterfly
Silver medal – second place	1999 Lisbon	100 m butterfly
Silver medal – second place	2000 Valencia	200 m butterfly
Silver medal – second place	2001 Antwerp	200 m butterfly
Silver medal – second place	2002 Riesa	200 m butterfly
Silver medal – second place	2004 Vienna	100 m butterfly
Silver medal – second place	2004 Vienna	200 m butterfly
Silver medal – second place	2005 Trieste	200 m butterfly
Bronze medal – third place	2000 Valencia	100 m butterfly
Bronze medal – third place	2002 Riesa	100 m butterfly
Bronze medal – third place	2003 Dublin	200 m butterfly

Mette Jacobsen (born 24 March 1973 in Nakskov) is a former freestyle and butterfly swimmer from Denmark who competed in five consecutive Summer Olympics for her native country, beginning in 1988. She won a total of 32 individual medals in international championships in a period from 1989 to 2005.

== Doping allegation and suspension ==
Prior to the 2004 Summer Olympics, Jacobsen was accused by FINA of using Salbutamol as a doping substance. In a 2006 interview with DR she told Jyllands-Posten that it had been legal for her to use this substance since 1993, because of her asthma. The substance itself produced prednisone, which according to FINA then increased her swimming capacity. She was suspended for half a year as a warning, which was issued by LEN, but never resumed swimming, because she could not compete without it.
