= Cathrin Carlzon =

Swedish swimmer

Medal record

Representing Sweden

Women's swimming

European Championships (LC)
Bronze medal – third place	2004 Madrid	4×100 m freestyle

European Championships (SC)
Gold medal – first place	2002 Riesa	4×50 m freestyle
Gold medal – first place	2001 Antwerp	4×50 m freestyle

Frida Cathrin Sofie Levander (née Carlzon; born 25 April 1983 in Västerhaninge, Stockholm County) is a Swedish former swimmer. She competed in the 2004 Summer Olympics, where Sweden finished on 7th place, in the 4×100 m freestyle preliminary round.

== Clubs ==
- Södertörns SS
