= Jens Schreiber =

German swimmer (born 1982)

Personal information
- Born: 26 August 1982 (age 44) Oldenburg, West Germany
- Height: 1.93 m (6 ft 4 in)
- Weight: 83 kg (183 lb)

Sport
- Sport: Swimming
- Club: SV Wasserfreunde 98, Hannover
Medal record
Men's swimming
Representing Germany
European Championships (SC)
| Silver medal – second place | 2003 Dublin | 4×50 m freestyle |
| Silver medal – second place | 2004 Vienna | 4×50 m freestyle |
| Bronze medal – third place | 2004 Vienna | 100 m freestyle |
| Gold medal – first place | 2006 Helsinki | 4×50 m medley |

Jens Schreiber (born 26 August 1982) is a German freestyle swimmer who won four medals at European Short Course Swimming Championships in 2003, 2004 and 2006; in 2006, his 4×50 m medley relay team won gold medals, setting a new world record. He also competed in four freestyle events at the Summer Olympics of 2004 and 2008; his best achievement was sixth place in the 4 × 200 m freestyle relay in 2004.
