= Fabian Friedrich =

German swimmer

Personal information
- Born: 1980 (age 45–46)

Sport
- Sport: Swimming
- Club: SG Frankfurt, SCW Eschborn,
Medal record
Representing Germany
European Championships (SC)
Gold medal – first place	2003 Dublin	4×50 m medley
Silver medal – second place	2003 Dublin	4×50 m freestyle
Gold medal – first place	2004 Vienna	4×50 m medley

Fabian Friedrich (born 1980) is a German swimmer who won one silver and two gold medals at European Short Course Swimming Championships in 2003 and 2004. While winning the 4×50 m medley relay in 2003, his team set a new world record.
