= 2002 European Short Course Swimming Championships =

Water sport competitions

- Host city: Riesa, Germany
- Date(s): 1–15 December 2002
- Venue(s): SachsenArena

The sixth edition of the European Short Course Swimming Championships (25 m) was held in the SachsenArena in Riesa, Germany, from December 12 till December 15, 2002.

== Medal table ==
* Host nation (Germany)

Rank	Nation	Gold	Silver	Bronze	Total
1	Germany (GER)*	7	7	8	22
2	Italy (ITA)	5	2	2	9
2	Sweden (SWE)	5	2	2	9
4	Ukraine (UKR)	4	2	3	9
5	Great Britain (GBR)	3	4	1	8
6	Hungary (HUN)	3	2	3	8
7	Slovakia (SVK)	3	0	0	3
8	Finland (FIN)	2	3	1	6
9	Belarus (BLR)	2	2	1	5
10	Austria (AUT)	1	2	0	3
11	Russia (RUS)	1	1	3	5
11	Slovenia (SLO)	1	1	3	5
13	Netherlands (NED)	1	0	2	3
14	Iceland (ISL)	1	0	1	2
15	Czech Republic (CZE)	0	3	0	3
16	Denmark (DEN)	0	2	1	3
17	France (FRA)	0	2	0	2
18	Croatia (CRO)	0	1	1	2
19	Switzerland (SUI)	0	1	0	1
20	Lithuania (LTU)	0	0	2	2
21	Greece (GRE)	0	0	1	1
21	Israel (ISR)	0	0	1	1
21	Romania (ROM)	0	0	1	1
21	Spain (ESP)	0	0	1	1
Totals (24 entries)		39	37	38	114

== Men's events ==
=== 50 m freestyle ===
RANK	FINAL	COUNTRY	TIME
Gold	Stefan Nystrand	(Sweden) SWE	21.55
Silver	Lorenzo Vismara	(Italy) ITA	21.66
Bronze	Rolandas Gimbutis	(Lithuania) LTU	21.74

=== 100 m freestyle ===
RANK	FINAL	COUNTRY	TIME
Gold	Lorenzo Vismara	(Italy) ITA	47.33
Silver	Jere Hård	(Finland) FIN	48.15
Bronze	Johan Kenkhuis	(Netherlands) NED	48.23

=== 200 m freestyle ===
RANK	FINAL	COUNTRY	TIME
Gold	Emiliano Brembilla	(Italy) ITA	1:45.39
Silver	Květoslav Svoboda	(Czech Republic) CZE	1:45.45
Bronze	Matteo Pelliciari	(Italy) ITA	1:45.79

=== 400 m freestyle ===
RANK	FINAL	COUNTRY	TIME
Gold	Emiliano Brembilla	(Italy) ITA	3:40.60
Silver	Yuri Prilukov	(Russia) RUS	3:41.90
Bronze	Athanasios Oikonomou	(Greece) GRE	3:44.68

=== 1500 m freestyle ===
RANK	FINAL	COUNTRY	TIME
Gold	Yuri Prilukov	(Russia) RUS	14:35.06 ER
Silver	David Davies	(United Kingdom) GBR	14:42.51
Bronze	Christian Minotti	(Italy) ITA	14:51.43

=== 50 m backstroke ===
RANK	FINAL	COUNTRY	TIME
Gold	Thomas Rupprath	(Germany) GER	23.66
Silver	Stev Theloke	(Germany) GER	24.29
Bronze	Darius Grigalionis	(Lithuania) LTU	24.62

=== 100 m backstroke ===
RANK	FINAL	COUNTRY	TIME
Gold	Thomas Rupprath	(Germany) GER	51.51
Silver	Stev Theloke	(Germany) GER	51.71
Bronze	Örn Arnarson	(Iceland) ISL	51.91

=== 200 m backstroke ===
RANK	FINAL	COUNTRY	TIME
Gold	Örn Arnarson	(Iceland) ISL	1:54.00
Silver	Stephen Parry	(United Kingdom) GBR	1:54.11
Bronze	Gordan Kožulj	(Croatia) CRO	1:54.50

=== 50 m breaststroke ===
RANK	FINAL	COUNTRY	TIME
Gold	Oleg Lisogor	(Ukraine) UKR	26.94
Silver	Mark Warnecke	(Germany) GER	27.15
Bronze	Jens Kruppa	(Germany) GER	27.36

=== 100 m breaststroke ===
RANK	FINAL	COUNTRY	TIME
Gold	Oleg Lisogor	(Ukraine) UKR	59.09
Silver	Hugues Duboscq	(France) FRA	59.18
Bronze	Jarno Pihlava	(Finland) FIN	59.49

=== 200 m breaststroke ===
RANK	FINAL	COUNTRY	TIME
Gold	Davide Rummolo	(Italy) ITA	2:07.70
Silver	Maxim Podoprigora	(Austria) AUT	2:09.87
Bronze	Richárd Bodor	(Hungary) HUN	2:10.62

=== 50 m butterfly ===
RANK	FINAL	COUNTRY	TIME
Gold	Jere Hård	(Finland) FIN	23.47
Silver	Miloš Milošević	(Croatia) CRO	23.62
Bronze	Igor Marchenko	(Russia) RUS	23.75

=== 100 m butterfly ===
RANK	FINAL	COUNTRY	TIME
Gold	Thomas Rupprath	(Germany) GER	50.77
Silver	Andriy Serdinov	(Ukraine) UKR	51.57
Bronze	Igor Marchenko	(Russia) RUS	51.61

=== 200 m butterfly ===
RANK	FINAL	COUNTRY	TIME
Gold	Stephen Parry	(United Kingdom) GBR	1:52.91
Silver	James Hickman	(United Kingdom) GBR	1:53.02
Bronze	Ioan Gherghel	(Romania) ROM	1:55.49

=== 100 m individual medley ===
RANK	FINAL	COUNTRY	TIME
Gold	Peter Mankoč	(Slovenia) SLO	53.05
Silver	Jani Sievinen	(Finland) FIN	53.58
Bronze	Oleg Lisogor	(Ukraine) UKR	53.65

=== 200 m individual medley ===
RANK	FINAL	COUNTRY	TIME
Gold	Jani Sievinen	(Finland) FIN	1:55.47
Silver	Tamás Kerékjártó	(Hungary) HUN	1:56.07
Bronze	Peter Mankoč	(Slovenia) SLO	1:56.28

=== 400 m individual medley ===
RANK	FINAL	COUNTRY	TIME
Gold	Alessio Boggiatto	(Italy) ITA	4:07.44
Silver	Jacob Carstensen	(Denmark) DEN	4:08.80
Bronze	László Cseh	(Hungary) HUN	4:08.96

=== 4 × 50 m freestyle relay ===
RANK	FINAL	COUNTRY	TIME
Gold	Johan Kenkhuis; Gijs Damen; Ewout Holst; Mark Veens	(Netherlands) NED	1:26.41
Silver	Lorenzo Vismara; Christian Galenda; Michele Scarica; Domenico Fioravanti	(Italy) ITA	1:26.63
Bronze	Denys Sylantyev; Oleksandr Volynets; Oleg Lisogor; Vyacheslav Shyrshov	(Ukraine) UKR	1:26.83

=== 4 × 50 m medley relay ===
RANK	FINAL	COUNTRY	TIME
Gold	Stev Theloke; Jens Kruppa; Thomas Rupprath; Carsten Dehmlow	(Germany) GER	1:34.72 WBT
Silver	Jani Sievinen; Jarno Pihlava; Tero Välimaa; Jere Hård	(Finland) FIN	1:35.69
Bronze	Vyacheslav Shyrshov; Oleg Lisogor; Andriy Serdinov; Oleksandr Volynets	(Ukraine) UKR	1:36.46

== Women's events ==
=== 50 m freestyle ===
RANK	FINAL	COUNTRY	TIME
Gold	Alison Sheppard	(United Kingdom) GBR	24.20
Silver	Aleksandra Gerasimenya	(Belarus) BLR	24.74
Bronze	Anna-Karin Kammerling	(Sweden) SWE	24.98

=== 100 m freestyle ===
RANK	FINAL	COUNTRY	TIME
Gold	Alena Popchanka	(Belarus) BLR	53.66
Gold	Martina Moravcová	(Slovakia) SVK	53.66
Bronze	Petra Dallmann	(Germany) GER	54.03

=== 200 m freestyle ===
RANK	FINAL	COUNTRY	TIME
Gold	Alena Popchanka	(Belarus) BLR	1:55.91
Silver	Solenne Figuès	(France) FRA	1:56.26
Bronze	Josefin Lillhage	(Sweden) SWE	1:56.57

=== 400 m freestyle ===
RANK	FINAL	COUNTRY	TIME
Gold	Éva Risztov	(Hungary) HUN	4:01.95
Silver	Yana Klochkova	(Ukraine) UKR	4:04.50
Bronze	Hannah Stockbauer	(Germany) GER	4:07.48

=== 800 m freestyle ===
RANK	FINAL	COUNTRY	TIME
Gold	Éva Risztov	(Hungary) HUN	8:14.72 ER
Silver	Flavia Rigamonti	(Switzerland) SUI	8:16.16
Bronze	Hannah Stockbauer	(Germany) GER	8:20.92

=== 50 m backstroke ===
RANK	FINAL	COUNTRY	TIME
Gold	Antje Buschschulte	(Germany) GER	27.62
Silver	Ilona Hlaváčková	(Czech Republic) CZE	27.75
Bronze	Janine Pietsch	(Germany) GER	27.88

=== 100 m backstroke ===
RANK	FINAL	COUNTRY	TIME
Gold	Antje Buschschulte	(Germany) GER	58.60
Silver	Ilona Hlaváčková	(Czech Republic) CZE	59.61
Bronze	Sarah Price	(United Kingdom) GBR	59.83

=== 200 m backstroke ===
RANK	FINAL	COUNTRY	TIME
Gold	Sarah Price	(United Kingdom) GBR	2.05.19
Silver	Antje Buschschulte	(Germany) GER	2.06.26
Bronze	Stanislava Komarova	(Russia) RUS	2.07.57

=== 50 m breaststroke ===
RANK	FINAL	COUNTRY	TIME
Gold	Emma Igelström	(Sweden) SWE	30.89
Silver	Sarah Poewe	(Germany) GER	30.90
Bronze	Janne Schäfer	(Germany) GER	31.12

=== 100 m breaststroke ===
RANK	FINAL	COUNTRY	TIME
Gold	Sarah Poewe	(Germany) GER	1:06.67
Silver	Mirna Jukić	(Austria) AUT	1:07.11
Bronze	Ágnes Kovács	(Hungary) HUN	1:07.97

=== 200 m breaststroke ===
RANK	FINAL	COUNTRY	TIME
Gold	Mirna Jukić	(Austria) AUT	2:21.66
Silver	Sarah Poewe	(Germany) GER	2:21.99
Bronze	Anne Poleska	(Germany) GER	2:23.51

=== 50 m butterfly ===
RANK	FINAL	COUNTRY	TIME
Gold	Anna-Karin Kammerling	(Sweden) SWE	25.78
Silver	Lena Hallander	(Sweden) SWE	26.74
Bronze	Vered Borochovski	(Israel) ISR	26.87

=== 100 m butterfly ===
RANK	FINAL	COUNTRY	TIME
Gold	Martina Moravcová	(Slovakia) SVK	56.82
Silver	Anna-Karin Kammerling	(Sweden) SWE	57.94
Bronze	Mette Jacobsen	(Denmark) DEN	59.09

=== 200 m butterfly ===
RANK	FINAL	COUNTRY	TIME
Gold	Éva Risztov	(Hungary) HUN	2:07.19
Silver	Mette Jacobsen	(Denmark) DEN	2:08.30
Bronze	Roser Vives	(Spain) ESP	2:08.40

=== 100 m individual medley ===
RANK	FINAL	COUNTRY	TIME
Gold	Martina Moravcová	(Slovakia) SVK	1:00.21
Silver	Alison Sheppard	(United Kingdom) GBR	1:00.99
Bronze	Alenka Kejžar	(Slovenia) SLO	1:01.43

=== 200 m individual medley ===
RANK	FINAL	COUNTRY	TIME
Gold	Yana Klochkova	(Ukraine) UKR	2:08.28 ER
Silver	Alenka Kejžar	(Slovenia) SLO	2:09.33
Bronze	Hanna Shcherba	(Belarus) BLR	2:10.23

=== 400 m individual medley ===
RANK	FINAL	COUNTRY	TIME
Gold	Yana Klochkova	(Ukraine) UKR	4:29.81
Silver	Éva Risztov	(Hungary) HUN	4:33.09
Bronze	Alenka Kejžar	(Slovenia) SLO	4:33.80

=== 4 × 50 m freestyle relay ===
RANK	FINAL	COUNTRY	TIME
Gold	Josefin Lillhage; Therese Alshammar; Anna-Karin Kammerling; Cathrin Carlzon	(Sweden) SWE	1:38.65
Silver	Aleksandra Gerasimenya; Hanna Shcherba; Sviatlana Khakhlova; Alena Popchanka	(Belarus) BLR	1:39.03
Bronze	Antje Buschschulte; Dorothea Brandt; Petra Dallman; Janine Pietsch	(Germany) GER	1:39.56

=== 4 × 50 m medley relay ===
RANK	FINAL	COUNTRY	TIME
Gold	Jenny Lind; Emma Igelström; Anna-Karin Kammerling; Therese Alshammar	(Sweden) SWE	1:48.42
Silver	Janine Pietsch; Sarah Poewe; Nele Hofmann; Antje Buschschulte	(Germany) GER	1:49.25
Bronze	Suze Valen; Madelon Baans; Chantal Groot; Marleen Veldhuis	(Netherlands) NED	1:50.56
