= 2004 European Short Course Swimming Championships =

Water sport competitions

- Host city: Vienna, Austria
- Date: 9–12 December 2004

The 8th European Short Course Swimming Championships was an international swimming meet organized by LEN, and held in Vienna, Austria, December 9–12, 2004. The meet featured teams from Europe, swimming in 38 short course events. It was held in Vienna's arena (Wiener Stadthalle), in a temporary pool.

== Participating nations ==
36 nations had swimmers at the 2004 Short Course Europeans:

- Andorra
- Austria
- Belarus
- Belgium
- Bulgaria
- Croatia
- Cyprus
- Czech Republic
- Denmark
- Estonia
- Finland
- France
- Germany
- Great Britain
- Greece
- Hungary
- Iceland
- Ireland
- Israel
- Italy
- Latvia
- Lithuania
- Netherlands
- Norway
- Poland
- Portugal
- Romania
- Russia
- Serbia and Montenegro
- Slovakia
- Slovenia
- Spain
- Sweden
- Switzerland
- Turkey
- Ukraine

== Results ==
=== Men's events ===
Event	Gold		Silver		Bronze	
50 freestyle	Mark Foster (United Kingdom) Great Britain	21.50	Mark Veens; Netherlands	21.72	Eduardo Lorente; Spain	21.75
100 freestyle	Frédérick Bousquet; France	47.52	Filippo Magnini; Italy	47.66	Jens Schreiber; Germany	48.00
200 freestyle	Filippo Magnini; Italy	1:44.57	Massimiliano Rosolino; Italy	1:44.95	Paweł Korzeniowski; Poland	1:45.58
400 freestyle	Massimiliano Rosolino; Italy	3:39.66	Yuri Prilukov; Russia	3:40.65	Paweł Korzeniowski; Poland	3:41.36
1500 freestyle	Yuri Prilukov; Russia	14:31.92	David Davies (United Kingdom) Great Britain	14:32.56	Massimiliano Rosolino; Italy	14:39.54
50 backstroke	Thomas Rupprath; Germany	23.27; WR	Vyacheslav Shyrshov; Ukraine	24.50	Helge Meeuw; Germany	24.52
100 backstroke	Thomas Rupprath; Germany	50.73	Markus Rogan; Austria	50.80	László Cseh; Hungary	52.09
200 backstroke	Markus Rogan; Austria	1:51.24; ER	Blaž Medvešek; Slovenia	1:52.39	Evgeny Aleshin; Russia	1:53.71
50 breaststroke	Oleg Lisogor; Ukraine	26.92	Roman Sloudnov; Russia	27.09	Emil Tahirovič; Slovenia	27.17
100 breaststroke	Roman Sloudnov; Russia	58.73	Oleg Lisogor; Ukraine	58.81	Igor Borysik; Ukraine	59.70'
200 breaststroke	Paolo Bossini; Italy	2:07.29	Sławomir Kuczko; Poland	2:07.61	Grigory Falko; Russia	2:07.66
50 butterfly	Mark Foster (United Kingdom) Great Britain	23.35	Jere Hård; Finland	23.38	Oliver Wenzel; Germany	23.50
100 butterfly	Thomas Rupprath; Germany	50.67	Nikolay Skvortsov; Russia	50.92	Ioan Gherghel; Romania	52.26
200 butterfly	Nikolay Skvortsov; Russia	1:52.90	Paweł Korzeniowski; Poland	1:53.19	Ioan Gherghel; Romania	1:54.86
100 I.M.	Peter Mankoč; Slovenia	53.05	Markus Rogan; Austria	53.64	Oliver Wenzel; Germany	54.14
200 I.M.	Markus Rogan; Austria	1:55.15	László Cseh; Hungary	1:55.36	Vytautas Janušaitis; Lithuania	1:57.45
400 I.M.	László Cseh; Hungary	4:03.96; ER	Luca Marin; Italy	4:05.93	Igor Berezutskiy; Russia	4:08.91
4 × 50 free relay	France; David Maître; Alain Bernard; Romain Barnier; Frédérick Bousquet	1:26.24	Germany; Benjamin Friedrich; Thomas Rupprath; Jens Schreiber; Carsten Dehmlow	1:26.30	Sweden; David Nordenlilja; Marcus Piehl; Erik Andersson; Petter Stymne	1:26.98
4 × 50 medley relay	Germany; Thomas Rupprath; Mark Warnecke; Fabian Friedrich; Carsten Dehmlow	1:34.56	Ukraine; Vyacheslav Shyrshov; Oleg Lisogor; Sergiy Breus; Oleksandr Volynets	1:34.94	Finland; Tero Raty; Jarno Pihlava; Jere Hård; Matti Rajakylä	1:35.89

=== Women's events ===
Event	Gold		Silver		Bronze	
50 freestyle	Marleen Veldhuis; Netherlands	24.34	Anna-Karin Kammerling; Sweden	24.57	Hinkelien Schreuder; Netherlands	24.64
100 freestyle	Malia Metella; France	53.37	Marleen Veldhuis; Netherlands	53.63	Josefin Lillhage; Sweden	53.64
200 freestyle	Josefin Lillhage; Sweden	1:55.36	Melanie Marshall (United Kingdom) Great Britain	1:56.36	Petra Dallmann; Germany	1:57.24
400 freestyle	Keri-Anne Payne (United Kingdom) Great Britain	4:03.60	Daria Parshina; Russia	4:04.56	Erika Villaecija; Spain	4:06.05
800 freestyle	Flavia Rigamonti; Switzerland	8:17.39	Lotte Friis; Denmark	8:22.38	Erika Villaecija; Spain	8:26.38
50 backstroke	Antje Buschschulte; Germany	27.42	Kateryna Zubkova; Ukraine	27.50	Ilona Hlaváčková; Czech Republic	27.57
100 backstroke	Kateryna Zubkova; Ukraine	58.58	Antje Buschschulte; Germany	58.70	Louise Ørnstedt; Denmark	58.76
200 backstroke	Louise Ørnstedt; Denmark	2:06.33	Sarah Price (United Kingdom) Great Britain	2:07.24	Gemma Spofforth (United Kingdom) Great Britain	2:07.64
50 breaststroke	Sarah Poewe; Germany	31.09	Elena Bogomazova; Russia	31.46	Kate Haywood (United Kingdom) Great Britain	31.52
100 breaststroke	Sarah Poewe; Germany	1:06.50	Mirna Jukić; Austria	1:07.05	Simone Weiler; Germany	1:07.70
200 breaststroke	Anne Poleska; Germany	2:21.79	Mirna Jukić; Austria	2:22.79	Sarah Poewe; Germany	2:24.33
50 butterfly	Anna-Karin Kammerling; Sweden	25.73	Martina Moravcová; Slovakia	26.14	Fabienne Nadarajah; Austria	26.27
100 butterfly	Martina Moravcová; Slovakia	56.89	Mette Jacobsen; Denmark	58.43	Malia Metella; France	58.47
200 butterfly	Martina Moravcová; Slovakia	2:06.68	Mette Jacobsen; Denmark	2:06.99	Caterina Giacchetti; Italy	2:07.11
100 I.M.	Aleksandra Urbanczyk; Poland	1:00.75	Lisa Chapman (United Kingdom) Great Britain	1:00.88	Teresa Rohmann; Germany	1:01.18
200 I.M.	Teresa Rohmann; Germany	2:09.40	Aleksandra Urbanczyk; Poland	2:10.64	Julie Hjorth-Hansen; Denmark	2:13.03
400 I.M.	Éva Risztov; Hungary	4:32.26	Teresa Rohmann; Germany	4:34.38	Katinka Hosszú; Hungary	4:35.41
4 × 50 free relay	Netherlands; Inge Dekker; Hinkelien Schreuder; Chantal Groot; Marleen Veldhuis	1:37.97	Germany; Dorothea Brandt; Janine Pietsch; Daniela Götz; Petra Dallmann	1:38.52	Sweden; Lina Petersson; Anna-Karin Kammerling; Josefin Lillhage; Claire Hedenskog	1:38.76
4 × 50 medley relay	Netherlands; Hinkelien Schreuder; Moniek Nijhuis; Inge Dekker; Marleen Veldhuis	1:48.21; WBT	Germany; Janine Pietsch; Sarah Poewe; Antje Buschschulte; Dorothea Brandt	1:48.52	Sweden; Emelie Kierkegaard; Sanja Dizdarević; Anna-Karin Kammerling; Josefin Lillhage	1:50.05

=== Medal table ===
* Host nation (Austria)

Rank	Nation	Gold	Silver	Bronze	Total
1	Germany (GER)	9	5	8	22
2	Russia (RUS)	3	4	3	10
3	Great Britain (GBR)	3	4	2	9
4	Italy (ITA)	3	3	2	8
5	Netherlands (NED)	3	2	1	6
6	France (FRA)	3	0	1	4
7	Ukraine (UKR)	2	5	1	8
8	Austria (AUT)*	2	4	1	7
9	Sweden (SWE)	2	1	4	7
10	Hungary (HUN)	2	1	2	5
11	Slovakia (SVK)	2	1	0	3
12	Denmark (DEN)	1	3	2	6
12	Poland (POL)	1	3	2	6
14	Slovenia (SLO)	1	1	1	3
15	Switzerland (SUI)	1	0	0	1
16	Finland (FIN)	0	1	1	2
17	Spain (ESP)	0	0	3	3
18	Romania (ROM)	0	0	2	2
19	Czech Republic (CZE)	0	0	1	1
19	Lithuania (LTU)	0	0	1	1
Totals (20 entries)		38	38	38	114

== Performance awards ==
Best newcomers: Kateryna Zubkova (UKR) and Igor Borysik (UKR). (Both were voted by the media, and received a special prize of Euro 1500 each.)

Top performances: a total of 32,000 Euro was awarded to the overall top-7 male and female performances. The athletes sharing the prize money were:

- Antje Buschschulte (GER)
- László Cseh (HUN)
- Anna-Karin Kammerling (SWE)
- Josefin Lillhage (SWE)
- Peter Mankoč (SLO)
- Martina Moravcová (SVK)
- Flavia Rigamonti (SUI)
- Éva Risztov (HUN)
- Markus Rogan (AUT)
- Teresa Rohmann (GER)
- Thomas Rupprath (GER)
