= Alenka Kejžar =

Slovenian swimmer

Personal information
- Full name: Alenka Kejžar
- Nationality: Slovenia
- Born: 15 February 1979 (age 47) Kranj
- Height: 1.77 m (5 ft 10 in)
- Weight: 64 kg (141 lb)

Sport
- Sport: Swimming
- Strokes: Breaststroke and medley
- Club: Plavalni Klub Radovljica
- College team: Southern Methodist University
Medal record
Women's Swimming
World Championships (SC)
| Silver medal – second place | 2002 Moscow | 400 m medley |
| Bronze medal – third place | 2000 Athens | 100 m medley |
European Championships (LC)
| Silver medal – second place | 2004 Madrid | 200 m breaststroke |
| Bronze medal – third place | 2002 Berlin | 200 m medley |
European Championships (SC)
| Gold medal – first place | 2003 Dublin | 200 m medley |
| Silver medal – second place | 1996 Rostock | 200 m breaststroke |
| Silver medal – second place | 2001 Antwerp | 100 m medley |
| Silver medal – second place | 2002 Riesa | 200 m medley |
| Silver medal – second place | 2003 Dublin | 100 m medley |
| Bronze medal – third place | 1996 Rostock | 100 m backstroke |
| Bronze medal – third place | 1996 Rostock | 200 m backstroke |
| Bronze medal – third place | 2001 Antwerp | 200 m medley |
| Bronze medal – third place | 2001 Antwerp | 400 m medley |
| Bronze medal – third place | 2002 Riesa | 400 m medley |

Alenka Kejžar is an Olympic class swimmer. She was born on 15 February 1979 in Kranj, Slovenia. Kejžar attended Southern Methodist University in Dallas, Texas.

Her coaches were Ciril Globočnik and Steve Collins. Her swimming career began in 1987, and ended in 2004. She participated in three consecutive Summer Olympics, starting in 1996 Summer Olympics in Atlanta. She has won medals in World Championships, World Cups and European Championships.

Kejžar worked as a swimming teacher for New International School of Thailand in Bangkok in 2005 - 2006. Her sister, Nataša Kejžar, is also a former Olympic swimmer.
