= Gijs Damen =

Dutch swimmer (born 1979)

Personal information
- Born: 20 July 1979 (age 46)
- Height: 1.98 m (6 ft 6 in)
- Weight: 84 kg (185 lb)

Sport
- Sport: Swimming
- Club: PSV/NZE, ZPC Breda, MNC Dordrecht
Medal record
Representing the Netherlands
European Championships (SC)
Silver medal – second place	2001 Antwerp	4×50 m freestyle
Gold medal – first place	2002 Riesa	4×50 m freestyle
Gold medal – first place	2003 Dublin	4×50 m freestyle
Gold medal – first place	2005 Trieste	4×50 m freestyle

Gijs Damen (born 20 July 1979) is a retired Dutch swimmer. Between 2001 and 2005 he won one silver and three gold medals in the 4×50 m freestyle relay at the European Short Course Swimming Championships. While winning the 2003 title the Dutch team set a new world record.

He retired from competitive swimming in September 2006 and lives in Breda.
