= Carsten Dehmlow =

German swimmer

Personal information
- Born: 1977 (age 48–49)

Sport
- Sport: Swimming
- Club: SG Berlin-Neukölln, SGS Hamburg, SV Würzburg
Medal record
Representing Germany
European Championships (SC)
Bronze medal – third place	1998 Sheffield	4×50 m freestyle
Gold medal – first place	2001 Antwerp	4×50 m medley
Gold medal – first place	2002 Riesa	4×50 m medley
Gold medal – first place	2003 Dublin	4×50 m medley
Silver medal – second place	2003 Dublin	4×50 m freestyle
Gold medal – first place	2004 Vienna	4×50 m medley
Silver medal – second place	2004 Vienna	4×50 m freestyle

Carsten Dehmlow (born 1977) is a German swimmer who won seven medals at European Short Course Swimming Championships of 1998–2004. While winning gold medals in 2001, 2002 and 2003 his team set new world records in the 4×50 m medley relay.
