= Jere Hård =

Finnish swimmer

Personal information
- Full name: Jere Johannes Hård
- Born: 7 December 1978 (age 47) Jyväskylä, Finland
- Height: 1.85 m (6 ft 1 in)
- Weight: 83 kg (183 lb)

Sport
- Country: Finland
- Sport: Swimming
- Strokes: Freestyle and butterfly
- Club: Swimming Jyväskylä
Medal record
European Championships (LC)
Gold medal – first place	2000 Helsinki	50 m butterfly
Gold medal – first place	2002 Berlin	50 m butterfly
European Championships (SC)
Gold medal – first place	2002 Riesa	50 m butterfly
Silver medal – second place	2000 Valencia	50 m butterfly
Silver medal – second place	2002 Riesa	100 m freestlye
Silver medal – second place	2004 Vienna	50 m butterfly
Silver medal – second place	2006 Helsinki	4×50 m medley
Bronze medal – third place	1999 Lisboa	50 m butterfly
Bronze medal – third place	2004 Vienna	4×50 m medley

Jere Hård (born 7 December 1978 in Jyväskylä, Finland) is a retired male freestyle and butterfly swimmer from Finland. He twice swam for his native country at the Olympics: in 2000 and 2004.

He mainly excelled in the – non-Olympic – 50 m butterfly event, in both long (50 m) and short course (25 m).
