= Örn Arnarson =

Icelandic swimmer

Personal information
- Full name: Örn Arnarson
- Nickname: Öddi
- Nationality: Iceland
- Born: 31 August 1981 (age 44) Reykjavík, Iceland
- Height: 6 ft 4 in (193 cm)
- Weight: 192 lb (87 kg)

Sport
- Sport: Swimming
- Strokes: backstroke
- Club: Sundfélag Hafnarfjarðar
Medal record
World Championships (LC)
Silver medal – second place	2001 Fukuoka	100 m backstroke
Bronze medal – third place	2001 Fukuoka	200 m backstroke
European Championships (SC)
Gold medal – first place	1998 Sheffield	200 m backstroke
Gold medal – first place	1999 Lisbon	100 m backstroke
Gold medal – first place	1999 Lisbon	200 m backstroke
Gold medal – first place	2000 Valencia	100 m backstroke
Gold medal – first place	2000 Valencia	200 m backstroke
Gold medal – first place	2002 Riesa	200 m backstroke
Silver medal – second place	2000 Valencia	50 m backstroke
Silver medal – second place	2003 Dublin	100 m backstroke
Bronze medal – third place	2002 Riesa	100 m backstroke
Bronze medal – third place	2006 Helsinki	50 m butterfly

Örn Arnarson (born 31 August 1981 in Reykjavík) is a swimmer from Iceland. He won his first major title in 1998 at the European SC Championships in Sheffield. There he captured the title in the 200 m backstroke.

A year later, at the European SC Championships 1999 in Lisbon, Portugal, Örn Arnarson won the 100 m and 200 m backstroke swimming events.

Örn Arnarson has participated in three Olympics in 2000, 2004, and 2008. He is the first Icelandic male swimmer ever to participate in the finals for the Olympics back in 2000 when he came 4th place in the 200m backstroke.

In late 2008, Örn Arnarson moved to Denmark, where he became the Elite Coach at Aalborg Svømmeklub Elitehold. After working for other swimming clubs in Denmark, Örn Arnarson moved to the west coast to work at Esbjerg Svømmeklub. In 2017, Örn Arnarson received the award for Årets Årgangs Juniortræner at Dansk Svømme Award 2017.
