= Peter Mankoč =

Slovenian swimmer (born 1978)

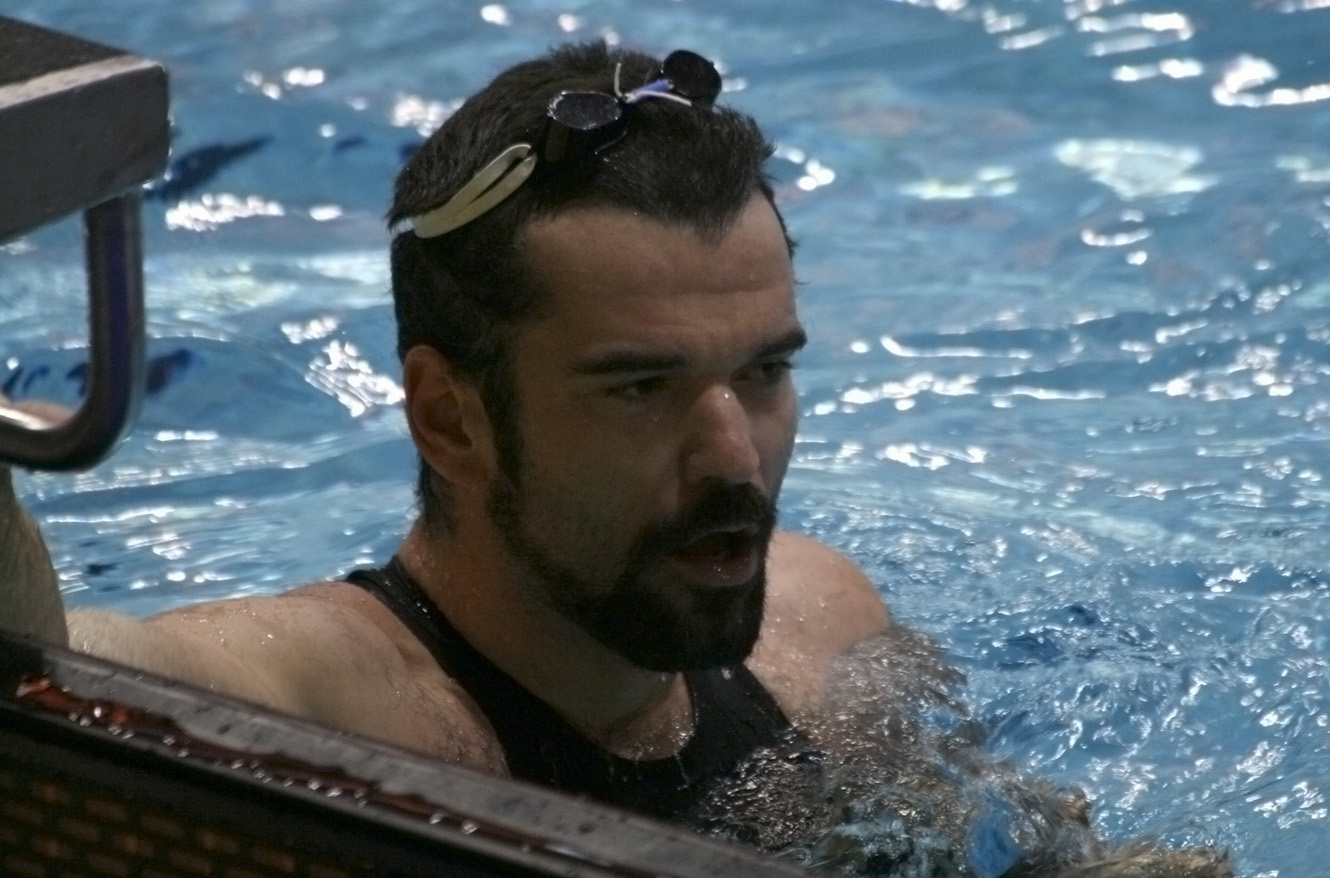
- Mankoč in Vienna, 2008

Personal information
- Nationality: Slovenia
- Born: 4 July 1978 (age 48) Ljubljana, SR Slovenia, SFR Yugoslavia
- Height: 1.92 m (6 ft 4 in)
- Weight: 87 kg (192 lb)

Sport
- Sport: Swimming
- Strokes: Butterfly and individual medley
- Club: Plavalni Klub Ilirija
Medal record
World Championships (SC)
Gold medal – first place	2002 Moscow	100 m medley
Gold medal – first place	2004 Indianapolis	100 m medley
Gold medal – first place	2008 Manchester	100 m butterfly
Silver medal – second place	2002 Moscow	200 m medley
Silver medal – second place	2006 Shanghai	100 m medley
Silver medal – second place	2008 Manchester	100 m medley
Bronze medal – third place	2004 Indianapolis	100 m butterfly
European Championships (LC)
Silver medal – second place	2008 Eindhoven	100 m butterfly
European Championships (SC)
Gold medal – first place	2000 Valencia	100 m medley
Gold medal – first place	2001 Anwerpen	100 m medley
Gold medal – first place	2001 Anwerpen	200 m medley
Gold medal – first place	2002 Riesa	100 m medley
Gold medal – first place	2003 Dublin	100 m medley
Gold medal – first place	2004 Riesa	100 m medley
Gold medal – first place	2005 Trieste	100 m medley
Gold medal – first place	2006 Helsinki	100 m medley
Gold medal – first place	2007 Debrecen	100 m medley
Gold medal – first place	2008 Rijeka	100 m medley
Gold medal – first place	2011 Szczecin	100 m medley
Silver medal – second place	1999 Lisbon	100 m medley
Silver medal – second place	2006 Helsinki	100 m butterfly
Silver medal – second place	2009 Istanbul	100 m butterfly
Silver medal – second place	2010 Eindhoven	100 m medley
Silver medal – second place	2012 Chartres	100 m medley
Silver medal – second place	2012 Chartres	4×50 m mixed medley
Bronze medal – third place	2000 Valencia	200 m medley
Bronze medal – third place	2001 Anwerpen	50 m backstroke
Bronze medal – third place	2002 Riesa	200 m medley
Bronze medal – third place	2003 Dublin	200 m medley
Bronze medal – third place	2005 Trieste	100 m butterfly
Bronze medal – third place	2007 Debrecen	100 m butterfly
Bronze medal – third place	2009 Istanbul	100 m medley
Bronze medal – third place	2010 Eindhoven	100 m butterfly
Summer Universiade
Silver medal – second place	2003 Daegu	50 m freestyle
Silver medal – second place	2003 Daegu	200 m freestyle
Bronze medal – third place	2001 Beijing	200 m medley
Mediterranean Games
Gold medal – first place	2001 Tunis	200 m medley
Gold medal – first place	2005 Almería	100 m butterfly
Gold medal – first place	2005 Almería	4×100 m medley
Bronze medal – third place	2009 Pescara	100 m butterfly

Peter Mankoč (born 4 July 1978 in Ljubljana, Slovenia) is a Slovenian swimmer. He is one of the most successful short course European Championship swimmers in the history of the event. Mankoč is the former world record holder in the 100 meter individual medley (short course).

== Personal ==
Mankoč was born in Ljubljana, where he has lived most of his life. He began swimming competitively at the age of eight. During his swimming career, he was employed as a police officer by the Slovenian government.

He is married to an Estonian swimmer Triin Aljand. They have two daughters Brina and Elise and one son Erik.

== Swimming ==
With height of 1.92 m and weight of 87 kg, Mankoč has always been a short distance swimmer. His strength and explosiveness led to short courses sprint preference, where he has achieved his best results.

Mankoč was a member of Ilirija Ljubljana swimming club, where he developed under coach Dimitrij Mancevič.

== Swimming career overview ==
Mankoč participated in five Olympic Games, 1996, 2000, 2004, 2008 and 2012. His best result is a 10th place in the 100 metre butterfly at the 2008 Olympic Games.

He also participated in four long course World Championships, from 2001 to 2007.

He was swimming in 1997, 1999, 2000, 2002 and 2004 European Championship competitions with 4 finals appearances.

Apart from 5 short course World Championships medals, he also has 7 other finals finishes from 1997 to 2006.

Mankoč participated in 11 European Championship short course events, where he collected 17 medals in 26 finals appearances. He is the only swimmer with nine consecutive gold medals in one discipline, the 100 meter individual medley. In this event, he won 14 consecutive medals, from 1999 to 2012.

== Personal best times ==
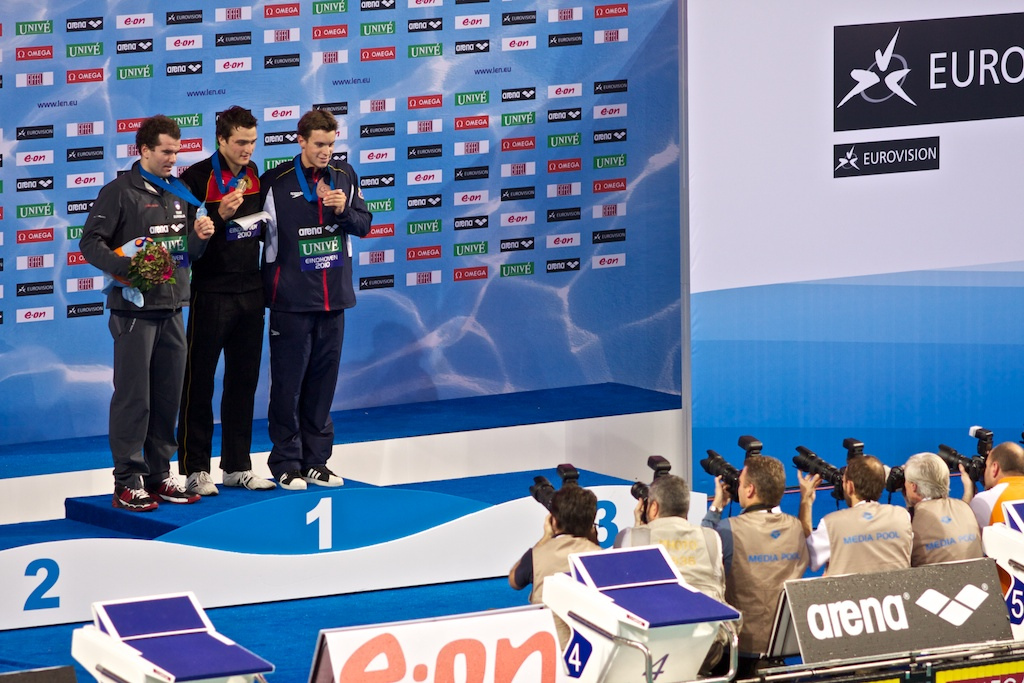
Mankoč on podium of the 2010 European SC WC in Eindhoven

Mankoč’s best times are sorted by FINA points calculation, a scoring system of the world swimming federation, which allows comparisons amongst different events. The points are correct in 2004–2008 Olympic game cycle. The ranking is correct as of December 2007 and represents European all-time ranking of personal records.

25 m course

Stroke	Points	Ranked	Time	Year
100 m medley	1039	#1	0:50.76	2009
100 m butterfly	996	#4	0:50.60	2007
200 m medley	976	#10	1:56.13	2002
50 m freestyle	929	#27	0:21.81	2002
50 m butterfly	924	#28	0:23,56	2006
100 m freestyle	916	#48	0:48.18	2003
50 m backstroke	904	#31	0:24.54	2001

50 m course

Stroke	Points	Ranked	Time	Year
50 m butterfly	975	#12	0:23.74	2007
100 m butterfly	968	#8	0:52.30	2007
100 m freestyle	945	#26	0:49.22	2005
200 m medley	932	#29	2:01.57	2002
200 m freestyle	920	#50	1:48.92	2003
50 m freestyle	918	#30	0:22.51	2005

Records
Preceded by (United States) Neil Walker (Russia) Sergey Fesikov	Men's 100 metre individual medley world record holder (short course); 15 December 2001 – 25 January 2003; 12 December 2009 – 15 December 2012	Succeeded by (Germany) Thomas Rupprath (United States) Ryan Lochte
