= 2001 European Short Course Swimming Championships =

Water sport competitions

- Host city: Antwerp, Belgium
- Date(s): 13–16 December 2001
- Venue(s): Wezenberg National Swimming Pool

The 5th European Short Course Championships was held December 13–16, 2001 at the Wezenberg Swimming Pool in Antwerp, Belgium. The meet featured competition in a short course (25 m) pool.

== Results ==
=== Men's events ===
Event	Gold		Silver		Bronze	
50 freestyle	Stefan Nystrand; Sweden	21.15	Oleksandr Volynets; Ukraine	21.60	Pieter van den Hoogenband; Netherlands	21.65
100 freestyle	Stefan Nystrand; Sweden	47.15	Pieter van den Hoogenband; Netherlands	47.42	Romain Barnier (France) FRA; Duje Draganja; Croatia	47.53
200 freestyle	Pieter van den Hoogenband; Netherlands	1:42.46; ER	Květoslav Svoboda; Czech Republic	1:44.78	Stefan Herbst; Germany	1:45.32
400 freestyle	Emiliano Brembilla; Italy	3:41.27	Jörg Hoffmann; Germany	3:42.09	Jacob Carstensen; Denmark	3:42.28
1500 freestyle	Jörg Hoffmann; Germany	14:41.20	Alexei Filipets; Russia	14:41.98	Nicolas Rostoucher; France	14:47.47
50 backstroke	Stev Theloke; Germany	23.97	Ante Mašković; Croatia	24.53	Peter Mankoč; Slovenia	24.54
100 backstroke	Thomas Rupprath; Germany	50.99	Stev Theloke; Germany	51.92	Gregor Tait (United Kingdom) Great Britain	52.90
200 backstroke	Gordan Kožulj; Croatia	1:53.37	Yoav Gath; Israel	1:54.15	Simon Dufour; France	1:54.21
50 breaststroke	Oleg Lisogor; Ukraine	26.71	Mark Warnecke; Germany	26.75	Darren Mew (United Kingdom) Great Britain	26.85
100 breaststroke	Oleg Lisogor; Ukraine	59.02	James Gibson (United Kingdom) Great Britain	59.23	Daniel Málek; Czech Republic	59.51
200 breaststroke	Maxim Podoprigora; Austria	2:07.79	Ian Edmond (United Kingdom) Great Britain	2:08.03	Daniel Málek; Czech Republic	2:09.07
50 butterfly	Lars Frölander; Sweden	23.07	Mark Foster (United Kingdom) Great Britain	23.11	Tero Välimaa; Finland	23.59
100 butterfly	Thomas Rupprath; Germany	50.26; WR	Lars Frölander; Sweden	50.58	James Hickman (United Kingdom) Great Britain	51.32
200 butterfly	James Hickman (United Kingdom) Great Britain	1:52.93	Denys Sylantyev; Ukraine	1:53.34	Anatoly Polyakov; Russia	1:53.54
100 I.M.	Peter Mankoč; Slovenia	52.94	Jens Kruppa; Germany	54.10	Jani Sievinen; Finland	54.17
200 I.M.	Peter Mankoč; Slovenia	1:56.18	Jani Sievinen; Finland	1:56.60	Alessio Boggiatto; Italy	1:57.52
400 I.M.	Alessio Boggiatto; Italy	4:06.99	Robin Francis (United Kingdom) Great Britain	4:08.49	Jacob Carstensen; Denmark	4:08.58
4 × 50 free relay	Ukraine; Denys Sylantyev; Oleksandr Volynets; Oleg Lisogor; Vyacheslav Shyrshov	1:26.09; ER	Netherlands; Johan Kenkhuis; Gijs Damen; Ewout Holst; Pieter van den Hoogenband	1:26.32	Sweden; Erik Dorch; Stefan Nystrand; Lars Frölander; Jonas Tilly	1:26.77
4 × 50 medley relay	Germany; Stev Theloke; Mark Warnecke; Thomas Rupprath; Carsten Dehmlow	1:35.14; ER	(United Kingdom) Great Britain; Gregor Tait; James Gibson; James Hickman; Mark Foster	1:35.19	Sweden; Jens Pettersson; Patrik Isaksson; Lars Frölander; Stefan Nystrand	1:37.71

=== Women's events ===
Event	Gold		Silver		Bronze	
50 freestyle	Inge de Bruijn; Netherlands	23.89	Therese Alshammar; Sweden	24.09	Johanna Sjöberg; Sweden	24.61
100 freestyle	Inge de Bruijn; Netherlands	52.65	Martina Moravcová; Slovakia	52.97	Johanna Sjöberg; Sweden	53.01
200 freestyle	Martina Moravcová; Slovakia	1:54.74; ER	Solenne Figuès; France	1:55.83	Alessa Ries; Germany	1:57.34
400 freestyle	Anja Čarman; Slovenia	4:02.72	Yana Klochkova; Ukraine	4:02.79	Irina Ufimtseva; Russia	4:05.68
800 freestyle	Flavia Rigamonti; Switzerland	8:17.20	Anja Čarman; Slovenia	8:20.31	Irina Ufimtseva; Russia	8:23.28
50 backstroke	Ilona Hlaváčková; Czech Republic	27.06; ER	Anu Koivisto; Finland	27.75	Janine Pietsch; Germany	27.79
100 backstroke	Ilona Hlaváčková; Czech Republic	57.75; ER	Sarah Price (United Kingdom) Great Britain	59.46	Janine Pietsch; Germany	59.79
200 backstroke	Sarah Price (United Kingdom) Great Britain	2.04.59	Nicole Hetzer; Germany	2.06.65	Anu Koivisto; Finland	2.07.10
50 breaststroke	Emma Igelström; Sweden	30.56 =WR	Janne Schaefer; Germany	30.92	Vera Lischka; Austria	31.37
100 breaststroke	Anne Poleska; Germany	1:07.25	Mirna Jukić; Austria	1:07.59	Heidi Earp (United Kingdom) Great Britain	1:08.25
200 breaststroke	Anne Poleska; Germany	2:21.93; ER	Mirna Jukić; Austria	2:22.26	Emma Igelström; Sweden	2:23.36
50 butterfly	Therese Alshammar; Sweden	25.73	Anna-Karin Kammerling; Sweden	25.88	Natalia Soutiaguina; Russia	27.25
100 butterfly	Martina Moravcová; Slovakia	57.20	Johanna Sjöberg; Sweden	57.79	Anna-Karin Kammerling; Sweden	57.98
200 butterfly	Otylia Jędrzejczak; Poland	2:07.95	Mette Jacobsen; Denmark	2:08.13	Georgina Lee (United Kingdom) Great Britain	2:08.14
100 I.M.	Martina Moravcová; Slovakia	1:00.16	Alenka Kejžar; Slovenia	1:00.90	Oxana Verevka; Russia	1:01.92
200 I.M.	Yana Klochkova; Ukraine	2:09.52	Nicole Hetzer; Germany	2:09.70	Alenka Kejžar; Slovenia	2:10.82
400 I.M.	Nicole Hetzer; Germany	4:29.46; ER	Yana Klochkova; Ukraine	4:31.31	Alenka Kejžar; Slovenia	4:33.46
4 × 50 free relay	Sweden; Cathrin Carlzon; Johanna Sjöberg; Therese Alshammar; Anna-Karin Kammerling	1:38.29	Netherlands; Suze Valen; Hinkelien Schreuder; Annabel Kosten; Inge de Bruijn	1:39.02	Germany; Petra Dallman; Ann-Christiane Langmaack; Katrin Meissner; Janine Pietsch	1:39.60
4 × 50 medley relay	Sweden; Therese Alshammar; Emma Igelström; Anna-Karin Kammerling; Johanna Sjöberg	1:48.32	Germany; Janine Pietsch; Janne Schaefer; Catherine Friedrich; Katrin Meissner	1:49.92	Netherlands; Suze Valen; Madelon Baans; Inge de Bruijn; Annabel Kosten	1:50.00

=== Medal table ===
Rank	Nation	Gold	Silver	Bronze	Total
1	Germany (GER)	8	8	5	21
2	Sweden (SWE)	7	4	6	17
3	Ukraine (UKR)	4	4	0	8
4	Netherlands (NED)	3	3	2	8
5	Slovenia (SLO)	3	2	3	8
6	Slovakia (SVK)	3	1	0	4
7	Great Britain (GBR)	2	6	5	13
8	Czech Republic (CZE)	2	1	2	5
9	Italy (ITA)	2	0	1	3
10	Austria (AUT)	1	2	1	4
11	Croatia (CRO)	1	1	1	3
12	Poland (POL)	1	0	0	1
12	Switzerland (SUI)	1	0	0	1
14	Finland (FIN)	0	2	3	5
15	Russia (RUS)	0	1	5	6
16	France (FRA)	0	1	3	4
17	Denmark (DEN)	0	1	2	3
18	Israel (ISR)	0	1	0	1
Totals (18 entries)		38	38	39	115
