= Igor Marchenko (swimmer) =

Russian butterfly swimmer (born 1975)

Personal information
- Full name: Igor Yuryevich Marchenko
- Nationality: Russia
- Born: 26 November 1975 (age 50) Rostov-on-Don, Rostov, Russian SFSR, Soviet Union

Sport
- Sport: Swimming
- Strokes: Butterfly
Medal record
Men's swimming
Representing Russia
World Championships (LC)
Silver medal – second place	2003 Barcelona	4×100 m medley
Silver medal – second place	2005 Montreal	4×100 m medley
Bronze medal – third place	2001 Fukuoka	4×100 m medley
European Championships (LC)
Gold medal – first place	2002 Berlin	4×100 m medley
European Championships (SC)
Bronze medal – third place	2002 Riesa	50 m butterfly
Bronze medal – third place	2002 Riesa	100 m butterfly

Igor Yuryevich Marchenko (born 26 November 1975) is a Russian butterfly swimmer who competed at the 2000 and 2004 Olympics.
