= Federico Bocchia =

Italian swimmer

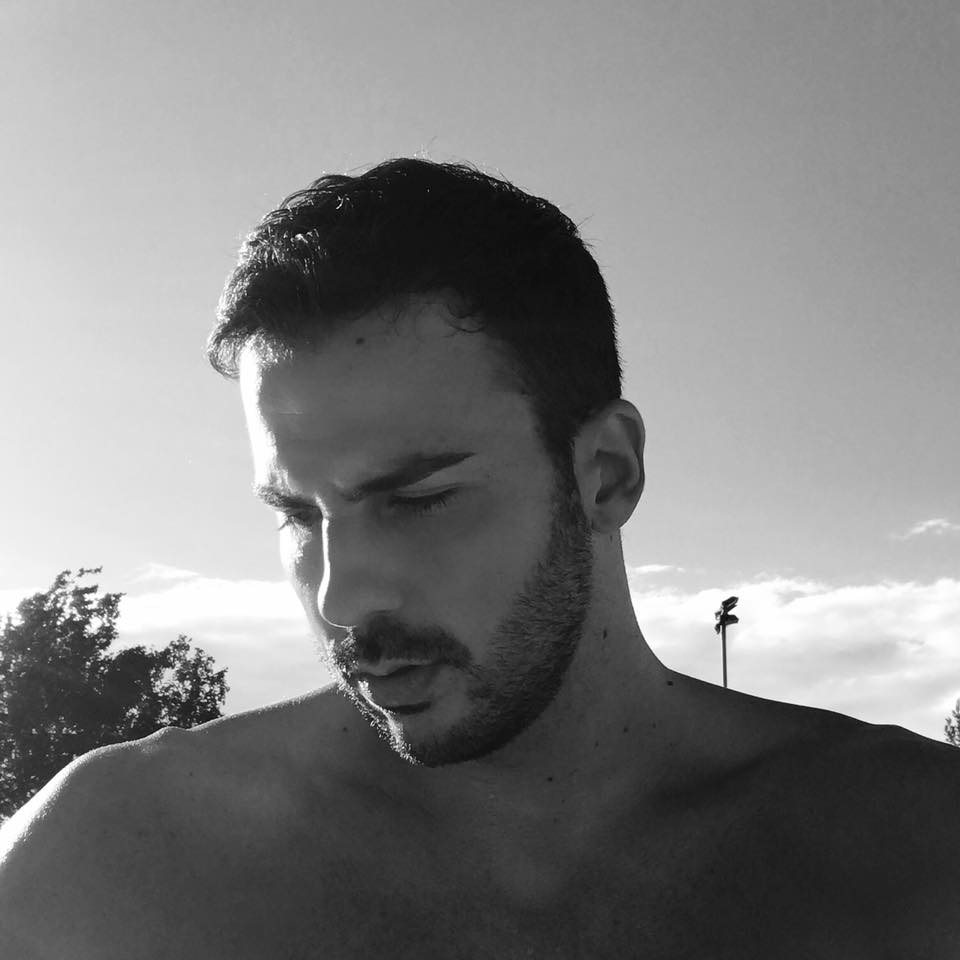
- Federico Bocchia

Personal information
- Nationality: Italian
- Born: 24 October 1986 (age 39) Parma
- Height: 1.97 m (6 ft 6 in)
- Weight: 93 kg (205 lb)

Sport
- Country: Italy
- Sport: Swimming
Medal record
Men's swimming
Representing Italy
European Championships (SC)
Gold medal – first place	2011 Szczecin	4×50 m freestyle
Gold medal – first place	2015 Netanya	4×50 m mixed freestyle
Gold medal – first place	2015 Netanya	4×50 m medley
Silver medal – second place	2013 Herning	4×50 m freestyle
Silver medal – second place	2015 Netanya	4×50 m freestyle
Bronze medal – third place	2009 Istanbul	4×50 m freestyle
Bronze medal – third place	2019 Glasgow	4×50 m freestyle
Mediterranean Games
Bronze medal – third place	2009 Pescara	50 m freestyle

Federico Bocchia (born 24 October 1986) is an Italian Olympic swimmer. He represented his country at the 2016 Summer Olympics.
