= Ian Edmond =

British swimmer

Personal information
- Full name: Ian Edmond
- National team: Great Britain
- Born: 2 June 1978 (age 48) Reading, England
- Height: 1.91 m (6 ft 3 in)
- Weight: 90 kg (198 lb)

Sport
- Sport: Swimming
- Strokes: Breaststroke
- Club: City of Edinburgh
Medal record
Men's swimming
Representing Great Britain
World Championships (LC)
Silver medal – second place	2003 Barcelona	200 m breaststroke
European Championships (SC)
Gold medal – first place	2003 Dublin	200 m breaststroke
Silver medal – second place	2001 Antwerp	200 m breaststroke

Ian Edmond (born 2 June 1978) is a former competitive swimmer and breaststroke specialist who represented Great Britain in the Olympics, FINA world championships, and European championships, and competed for Scotland in the Commonwealth Games.

In his junior years he swam for Reading SC in England, and joined Warrender BC as his Scottish club team. In 1996 he relocated to Edinburgh for University and swam with Warrender and the City of Edinburgh Swim Team under coach Tim Jones.

Edmond was the silver medallist at the 2003 World Aquatics Championships in the 200 m breaststroke. In the same year he was champion in the same event at the European SC Championships.

At the 2004 Olympic Games in Athens he represented Great Britain in the men's 200-metre breaststroke where he reached the semi-final, but was disqualified during his swim. He also represented Scotland at the 1998 and 2002 Commonwealth Games.

Today Ian Edmond lives in Scotland and has a wife and two children

== See also ==
- List of British records in swimming
