= Oleksandr Volynets =

Ukrainian swimmer (born 1974)

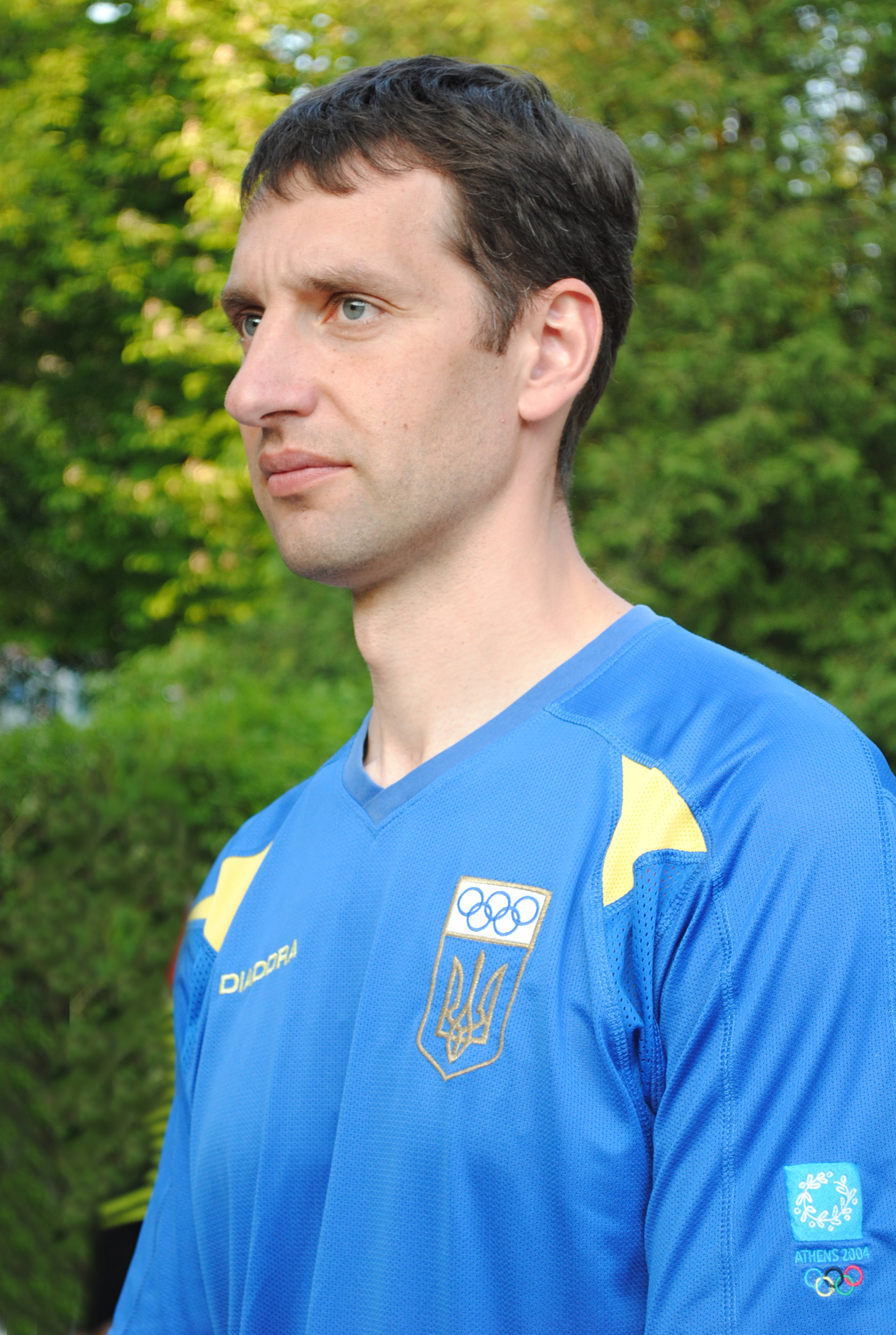

Personal information
- Full name: Олександр Волинець
- Nationality: Ukraine
- Born: 9 October 1974 (age 51) Ternopil, Ukrainian SSR, Soviet Union
- Height: 6 ft 7 in (201 cm)
- Weight: 187 lb (85 kg)

Sport
- Sport: Swimming
- Strokes: Freestyle
Medal record
World Championships (SC)
Bronze medal – third place	2002 Moscow	50 m freestyle
Bronze medal – third place	2006 Shanghai	50 m freestyle
European Championships (LC)
Silver medal – second place	2006 Budapest	50 m freestyle
Bronze medal – third place	2002 Berlin	50 m freestyle
European Championships (SC)
Gold medal – first place	2001 Antwerp	4×50 m freestyle
Silver medal – second place	2001 Antwerp	50 m freestyle
Bronze medal – third place	2000 Valencia	50 m freestyle

Oleksandr Volynets (born 9 October 1974 in Ternopil) is a Ukrainian swimmer who competes in the freestyle events. He has been a scholarship holder with the Olympic Solidarity Program since August 2002.

== Achievements ==
- 2006 FINA Short Course World Championships - bronze medal (50 m freestyle)
- 2004 Olympic Games - seventh place (50 m freestyle)
- 2002 FINA Short Course World Championships - bronze medal (50 m freestyle)
- 2002 FINA World Cup - silver medal (50 m freestyle)
- 2000 Olympic Games - eighth place (50 m freestyle)
