= 2003 European Junior Swimming Championships =

Water sport competitions

The 2003 European Junior Swimming Championships were held in Glasgow 31 July-3 August.

== Medal table ==
* Host nation (Great Britain)

Rank	Nation	Gold	Silver	Bronze	Total
1	Russia (RUS)	7	4	1	12
2	Great Britain (GBR)*	6	6	8	20
3	Germany (GER)	6	4	2	12
4	Hungary (HUN)	5	3	4	12
5	Ukraine (UKR)	3	1	4	8
6	Italy (ITA)	2	6	2	10
7	France (FRA)	2	4	3	9
8	Poland (POL)	2	1	2	5
9	Slovenia (SLO)	2	0	1	3
10	Greece (GRE)	1	1	4	6
11	Croatia (CRO)	1	1	1	3
12	Lithuania (LIT)	1	0	0	1
13	Denmark (DEN)	0	4	2	6
14	Bulgaria (BUL)	0	1	0	1
14	Finland (FIN)	0	1	0	1
14	Norway (NOR)	0	1	0	1
17	Austria (AUT)	0	0	1	1
17	Estonia (EST)	0	0	1	1
17	Netherlands (NED)	0	0	1	1
17	Sweden (SWE)	0	0	1	1
Totals (20 entries)		38	38	38	114

== Results ==
=== Boy's events ===
Event	Gold		Silver		Bronze	
50 m freestyle	Yuriy Yegoshin; Ukraine	23.02	Manu Mantymaki; Finland	23.03	Alexei Puninski; Croatia	23.06
100 m freestyle	Yuriy Yegoshin; Ukraine	49.63	Amaury Leveaux; France	50.37	Jernej Godec; Slovenia	50.51
200 m freestyle	Evgeny Natsvin; Russia	1:50.74	David Davies; Great Britain	1:51.15	László Cseh; Hungary	1:51.16
400 m freestyle	Przemyslaw Stancyk; Poland	3:51.71	Nicola Cassio; Italy	3:52.42	David Davies; Great Britain	3:54.80
1500 m freestyle	David Davies; Great Britain	15:09.69	Przemyslaw Stancyk; Poland	15:25.24	Sebastien Rouault; France	15:34.64
50 m backstroke	Liam Tancock; Great Britain	25.60	Marco Di Carli; Germany	25.76	Aristeidis Grigoridis; Greece	26.15
100 m backstroke	László Cseh; Hungary	55.06	Marco Di Carli; Germany	55.11	Liam Tancock; Great Britain	56.21
200 m backstroke	László Cseh; Hungary	1:58.99	Luca Marin; Italy	2:01.77	Sebastian Stoss; Austria	2:02.18
50 m breaststroke	Alessandro Terrin; Italy	28.12	Gábor Financsek; Hungary	28.83	Anthony Thiallet; France	29.05
100 m breaststroke	Alessandro Terrin; Italy	1:02.36	Alexander Dale Oen; Norway	1:02.53	Valeriy Dymo; Ukraine	1:02.94
200 m breaststroke	Johannes Neumann; Germany	2:14.56	Paolo Bussini; Italy	2:14.61	Fabien Borth; France	2:17.65
50 m butterfly	Alexei Puninski; Croatia	24.41	Jakob Andkjaer; Denmark	24.48	Marcus Piehl; Sweden	24.51
100 m butterfly	Rimvydas Salcius; Lithuania	52.25	Amaury Leveaux; France	54.19	Sotiris Pastras; Greece	54.60
200 m butterfly	Paweł Korzeniowski; Poland	1:58.32	Boldizsár Kiss; Hungary	2:00.80	Ádám Madarassy; Hungary	2:01.04
200 m individual medley	Marc Uppenkamp; Germany	2:03.72	Mihail Alexandrov; Bulgaria	2:04.51	Jan Christoph; Germany	2:04.64
400 m individual medley	László Cseh; Hungary	4:16.88	Luca Marin; Italy	4:19.64	Paweł Korzeniowski; Poland	4:22.13
4 × 100 m freestyle relay	France; Antoine Galavtine; Fabien Horth; Sebastien Bodet; Amaury Leveaux	3:21.10	Croatia; Alexei Puninski; Mario Delac; Bruno Barbic; Marko Skunka	3:24.75	Great Britain; Michael Stephenson; Craig Gibbons; Ben Hutchinson; Edward Denton	3:24.84
4 × 200 m freestyle relay	Russia; Konstantin Kolyasnikov; Sergei Fillipov; Anton Stepanov; Evgeny Natsvin	7:27.24	France; Yoann Soldermann; Guillaume Strohmeyer; Sebastien Bodet; Amaury Leveaux	7:27.41	Italy; Francesco Seccharioli; Vanni Mangoni; Nicola Cassio; Paolo Bossini	7:27.75
4 × 100 m medley relay	Hungary; László Cseh; Gábor Financsek; Ádám Madarassy; Krisztián Takács	3:42.69	Germany; Marco Di Carli; Johannes Neumann; Benjamin Starke; Robert Konneker	3:44.01	Great Britain; Liam Tancock; Lee Wrightwick; Martin Leel; Craig Gibbons	3:45.63

=== Girl's events ===
Event	Gold		Silver		Bronze	
50 m freestyle	Daniela Gotz; Germany	25.71	Jeanette Ottesen; Denmark	26.33	Jane Trepp; Romania	26.37
100 m freestyle	Daniela Gotz; Germany	55.64	Federica Pellegrini; Italy	56.24	Jeanette Ottesen; Denmark	56.93
200 m freestyle	Daria Parshina; Russia	2:01.21	Regina Sytch; Russia	2:01.81	Evangelia Tsagka; Greece	2:03.20
400 m freestyle	Regina Sytch; Russia	4:12.28	Daria Parshina; Russia	4:13.61	Keri-anne Payne; Great Britain	4:16.64
800 m freestyle	Regina Sytch; Russia	8:38.67	Keri-anne Payne; Great Britain	8:47.41	Lotte Friis; Denmark	8:49.16
50 m backstroke	Gemma Spofforth; Great Britain	29.40	Kateryna Zubkova; Ukraine	29.67	Nikolett Szepesi; Hungary	29.76
100 m backstroke	Esther Baron; France	1:02.43	Stephanie Proud; Great Britain	1:02.69	Gemma Spofforth; Great Britain	1:03.02
200 m backstroke	Stephanie Proud; Great Britain	2:12.22	Esther Baron; France	2:12.60	Nikolett Szepesi; Hungary	2:15.99
50 m breaststroke	Kate Haywood; Great Britain	31.67	Grace Callaghan; Great Britain	32.10	Moniek Nijhuis; Netherlands	32.27
100 m breaststroke	Grace Callaghan; Great Britain	1:09.86	Kate Haywood; Great Britain	1:09.91	Yuliya Pidlisna; Ukraine	1:10.15
200 m breaststroke	Iryna Maystruk; Ukraine	2:28.21	Sonja Helbig; Germany	2:29.70	Yuliya Pidlisna; Ukraine	2:31.92
50 m butterfly	Vasilisa Vladykina; Russia	26.96	Jeanette Ottesen; Denmark	27.25	Aleksandra Urbancyk; Poland	27.28
100 m butterfly	Beatrix Boulsevicz; Hungary	59.77	Jeanette Ottesen; Denmark	1:00.98	Elena Gemo; Italy	1:01.02
200 m butterfly	Vasilik Angelopolou; Greece	2:10.64	Beatrix Boulsevicz; Hungary	2:10.91	Yana Martynova; Russia	2:13.33
200 m individual medley	Anja Klinar; Slovenia	2:15.83	Vasilik Angelopolou; Greece	2:16.24	Athina Tzavella; Greece	2:16.35
400 m individual medley	Anja Klinar; Slovenia	4:42.67	Yana Tolkatcheva; Russia	4:46.16	Yuliya Pildisna; Ukraine	4:47.36
4 × 100 m freestyle relay	Germany; Daniela Gotz; Melanie Otto; Franziska Skrubel; Lara Timm	3:46.76	Russia; Maria Mayrovich; Yana Tolkatcheva; Regina Sytch; Daria Parshina	3:49.56	Great Britain; Rose Morahan; Stephanie Proud; Danielle Berry; Kate Richardson	3:50.06
4 × 200 m freestyle relay	Russia; Maria Bulakhova; Regina Sytch; Yana Tolkatcheva; Daria Parshina	8:10.57	Great Britain; Stephanie Proud; Kate Richardson; Danielle Berry; Keri-anne Payne	8:14.07	Germany; Daniele Gotz; Pia Kossak; Lara Timm; Stephanie Backhaus	8:19.56
4 × 100 m medley relay	Germany; Stephanie Backhaus; Sonja Helbig; Franszika Skrubel; Daniela Gotz	4:12.42	Italy; Chiara Petteno; Veronica Demozzi; Elena Gemo; Federica Pellegrini	4:13.49	Great Britain; Stephanie Proud; Grace Callaghan; Laura Campbell; Kate Richardson	4:14.15
