= 2004 European Junior Swimming Championships =

Water sport competitions

The 2004 European Junior Swimming Championships were held from 15 to 18 July 2004 in Lisbon, Portugal.

== Medal summary ==
=== Boy's events ===
Event	Gold		Silver		Bronze	
50 m freestyle	Lukasz Gasior; Poland	22.78	Federico Bocchia; Italy	22.80	Bruno Barbic; Croatia	22.87
100 m freestyle	Lukasz Gasior; Poland	50.19	Dmitry Semenov; Russia	50.69	Tiago Venâncio; Portugal	50.70
200 m freestyle	Paul Biedermann; Germany	1:48.62 CR	Dmitry Semenov; Russia	1:50.25	Lukasz Gasior; Poland	1:50.30
400 m freestyle	Paul Biedermann; Germany	3:51.52	Sebastien Rouault; France	3:52.43	Andrew Hunter; Great Britain	3:54.44
1500 m freestyle	Paul Biedermann; Germany	15:18.94	Sebastien Rouault; France	15:19.56	Samuel Pizzetti; Italy	15:25.09
50 m backstroke	Aschwin Wildeboer; Spain	26.32	Pavel Komarov; Russia	26.53	Nick Driebergen; Netherlands	26.71
100 m backstroke	Aschwin Wildeboer; Spain	56.40	Scott Houston; Great Britain	57.02	Pavel Komarov; Russia	57.54
200 m backstroke	Antonios Gkioulmpas; Greece	2:01.54	Mattia Aversa; Italy	2:02.42	Pavel Komarov; Russia	2:03.10
50 m breaststroke	Fernando Mazzotta; Italy	28.45	Lennart Stekelenburg; Netherlands	28.90	Iisakki Ratilainen; Finland	28.99
100 m breaststroke	Grigory Falko; Russia	1:02.33	Ákos Molnár; Hungary	1:02.56	Lennart Stekelenburg; Netherlands	1:03.07
200 m breaststroke	Grigory Falko; Russia	2:13.08	Ákos Molnár; Hungary	2:15.53	Denis Krivasheev; Russia	2:16.36
50 m butterfly	Benjamin Starke; Germany	24.42	Markus vom Scheidt; Germany	24.63	Soitirios Pastras/Luka Vrtovec; Greece/Slovenia	24.78
100 m butterfly	Benjamin Starke; Germany	53.82	Sotirios Pastras; Greece	54.00	Toni Embacher; Germany	54.84
200 m butterfly	Maciej Lewandowski; Poland	1:59.92	Matthew Edwards; Great Britain	2:00.12	Benjamin Starke; Germany	2:00.65
200 m individual medley	Sasa Impric; Croatia	2:03.49	Marc Uppenkamp/Robert Smith; Germany/Germany	2:04.49	none awarded	
400 m individual medley	Marc Uppenkamp; Germany	4:26.35	Pavel Stepanov; Russia	4:27.82	Sebastian Stoss; Austria	4:27.99
4 × 100 m freestyle relay	Russia; A. Grechin; A.Lapin; Dmitry Semenov; Grigory Stepanov	3:22.61	Germany; Steffen Deibler; Benjamin Starke; Michael Schubert; Robert Koenneker	3:22.66	Italy; V. Dinia; Alessandro Chinellatto; A. Busato; Federico Bocchia	3:23.84
4 × 200 m freestyle relay	Russia; A. Rusin; Vitaly Romanovich; Grigory Stepanov; Dmitry Semenov	7:27.26	Germany; Robert Koenneker; O.Harms; Paul Biedermann; Benjamin Starke	7:27.88	Great Britain; Dean Milwain; L.Owens; L.Wardley; Andrew Hunter	7:30.82
4 × 100 m medley relay	Russia; P.Komarov; Grigory Falko; Maksim Ganikhin; Dmitry Semenov	3:44.14	Italy; Miro Di Tora; Fernando Mazzotta; L.Benatti; Alessandro Chinellato	3:45.89	Germany; A. Cancelliere; Alexander Schendel; Benjamin Starke; Michael Schubert	3:45.94

=== Girl's events ===
Event	Gold		Silver		Bronze	
50 m freestyle	Gaia Mancabelli; Italy	25.84	Katarina Milly; Slovakia	26.32	Jane Trepp; Estonia	26.49
100 m freestyle	Sara Isakovic; Slovenia	56.57	Daniela Schreiber; Germany	56.95	Ionela Cozma; Romania	57.36
200 m freestyle	Sara Isakovic; Slovenia	1:59.85 CR	Daria Parshina; Russia	2:01.03	Katinka Hosszú; Hungary	2:02.30
400 m freestyle	Daria Parshina; Russia	4:10.79	Arantxa Ramos Plasencia; Spain	4:11.98	Larisa Ilchenko; Russia	4:12.12
800 m freestyle	Rebecca Adlington; Great Britain	8:39.63	Arantxa Ramos Plasencia; Spain	8:41.07	Lotte Friis; Denmark	8:41.40
50 m backstroke	Chiara Pettano; Italy	29.87	Franziska Gaehler; Germany	29.97	Hollie O'Connor; Great Britain	30.12
100 m backstroke	Stephanie Proud; Great Britain	1:02.83	Maria Gromova; Russia	1:03.43	Franziska Gaehler; Germany	1:03.49
200 m backstroke	Stephanie Proud; Great Britain	2:11.85	Stella Boumi; Greece	2:14.82	Evelyn Verrasztó; Hungary	2:14.93
50 m breaststroke	Moniek Nijhuis; Netherlands	32.01	Anna Valkova; Russia	32.81	Silvia Rossi; Italy	32.81
100 m breaststroke	Moniek Nijhuis; Netherlands	1:10.48	Natalya Lovtsova; Russia	1:10.85	Rachel Wilson; Great Britain	1:10.92
200 m breaststroke	Sara Perez Sala; Spain	2:29.71	Natalya Lovtsova; Russia	2:32.06	Marta Kacprzak; Poland	2:32.44
50 m butterfly	Marilies Demal; Austria	27.08	Gaia Mancabelli; Italy	27.55	Denisa Smolenova; Slovakia	27.78
100 m butterfly	Maria Bulakhova; Russia	59.98	Caterina Giacchetti; Italy	1:00.30	Emilia Nilsson; Sweden	1:01.48
200 m butterfly	Caterina Giacchetti; Italy	2:09.92 CR	Maria Bulakhova; Russia	2:10.60	Antje Mahn; Germany	2:13.17
200 m individual medley	Anja Klinar; Slovenia	2:16.10	Zsuzsanna Jakabos; Hungary	2:17.81	Maria Rodygina; Russia	2:18.10
400 m individual medley	Zsuzsanna Jakabos; Hungary	4:42.01	Anja Klinar; Slovenia	4:42.02	Katinka Hosszú; Hungary	4:43.62
4 × 100 m freestyle relay	Germany; Christina Werner; Michelle Matthes; Marit Burckhardt; Daniela Schreiber	3:49.19	Hungary; Fridericka Szel; Ágnes Mutina; Katinka Hosszú; Zsuzsanna Jakabos	3:49.37	Russia; Natalya Lovtsova; Alexandra Malochueva; Anna Smirnova; Daria Parshina	3:50.92
4 × 200 m freestyle relay	Hungary; Ágnes Mutina; Evelyn Verrasztó; Katinka Hosszú; Zsuzsanna Jakabos	8:11.86	Russia; Elena Simonova; Maria Bulakhova; Larisa Ilchenko; Daria Parshina	8:12.06	Great Britain; Stephanie Proud; Danielle Berry; Lorna Smith; Lorna Tonks	8:15.20
4 × 100 m medley relay	Russia; Maria Gromova; Natalya Lovtsova; Maria Bulakhova; Daria Parshina	4:11.66	Germany; Franziska Gaehler; Natalie Krueger; Franziska Hentke; Daniela Schreiber	4:14.74	Great Britain; Stephanie Proud; Lorna Tonks; Stephanie Johnson; Victoria Robinson	4:14.86
