= List of English records in swimming =

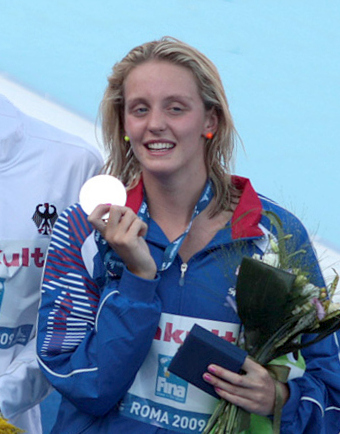
Fran Halsall (pictured) holds the most English swimming records with 11.

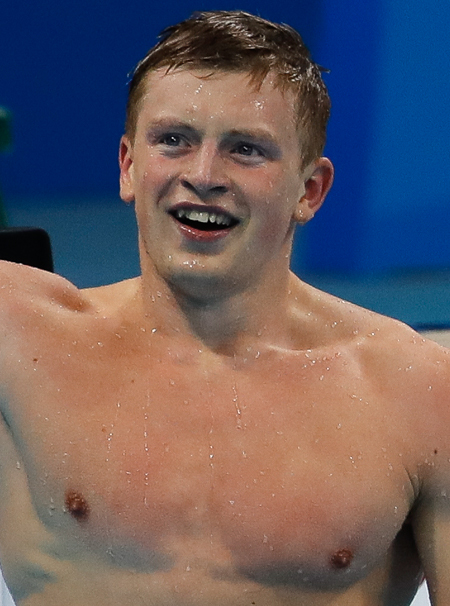
Adam Ramsay-Peaty (pictured) holds nine English swimming records, more than any other male English swimmer.

The English records in swimming are ratified by England's governing body in swimming, Swim England. Records can be set in long course (50 metres) or short course (25 metres) swimming pools, with records currently recorded in the following events for both men and women.

- Freestyle: 50 m, 100 m, 200 m, 400 m, 800 m, 1500 m
- Backstroke: 50 m, 100 m, 200 m
- Breaststroke: 50 m, 100 m, 200 m
- Butterfly: 50 m, 100 m, 200 m
- Individual medley: 100 m (short course only), 200 m, 400 m
- Relays: 4 × 50 m freestyle (short course only), 4 × 100 m freestyle, 4 × 200 m freestyle, 4 × 50 m medley (short course only), 4 × 100 m medley
- Mixed relays: 4 × 50 m mixed freestyle (short course only), 4 × 100 m mixed freestyle (long course only), 4 × 50 m mixed medley (short course only), 4 × 100 m mixed medley

The relay records displayed here are the official national relay records. However, Swim England maintains a separate set of national relay records for club teams, which are not shown here. Records can also be set at intermediate distances in an individual race and for the first leg of a relay race.

The ratification process involves the swimmer submitting an application to Swim England, providing details such as the swimmer's name(s), time swum, date and location of the swim, names of officials, and the swimsuit model worn. Once ratified, the records appear on the official records listing. Records that have not yet been fully ratified are marked with a '#' symbol in these lists, and all records were achieved in finals unless otherwise noted.

Freestyler and butterfly swimmer Fran Halsall, who retired in 2017 holds the most English records with six individual and 11 in total. She is followed by Adam Ramsay-Peaty with nine records to his name and Siobhan-Marie O'Connor and Ben Proud who both currently hold seven English records each, as of May 2026.

English swimming records have been set in a total of 90 events. The only two events where English records have not yet been recorded are the mixed 4 × 50 m freestyle and the mixed 4 × 100 m medley short course events.

Currently two English records are also world records, both held by Peaty. The long course 50 metre breaststroke record of 25.95 seconds set at the 2017 World Championships and the 56.88 seconds set in the long course 100 metre breaststroke event at the 2019 World Championships. One record is also currently a European record, Ben Proud's 20.18 in 50 metre freestyle set at the 2023 European Short Course Swimming Championships A further four records are current Commonwealth records and 44 are current British records.

Fourteen records still stand that were set by swimmers wearing bodysuits or suits made of polyurethane or other non-textile materials permitted between February 2008 until December 2009. On the eve of the 2009 World Aquatics Championships in Rome, FINA voted to ban the use of bodysuits and all suits made of non-textile materials starting 1 January 2010.

Fourteen of the twenty relay records were set by an all English team representing Great Britain at an international meet and one was set by a quartet in a time trial event at the British Championships. Of remaining five, three were set by Team England at the Commonwealth Games and two are held by club teams.

The oldest English swimming record that still stands is the 4 × 200 metre freestyle short course relay record of 7:03.06 set by Edward Sinclair, Marc Spackman, Paul Palmer and James Salter representing Great Britain at the 2000 World Short Course Swimming Championships in Athens.

== Long course (50 m) ==
=== Men ===
List of English men's long course swimming records
Event	Time		Name	Club	Date	Meet	Location	Ref
50 m freestyle	21.11	sf, NR	Ben Proud	Great Britain	8 August 2018	European Championships	Glasgow, United Kingdom	
50 m freestyle	20.98	unofficial	Ben Proud	Great Britain	24 May 2026	Enhanced Games	Las Vegas, United States	
100 m freestyle	47.63	sf	Lewis Burras	Great Britain	21 June 2022	World Championships	Budapest, Hungary	
200 m freestyle	1:44.22	NR	Tom Dean	Great Britain	27 July 2021	Olympic Games	Tokyo, Japan	
400 m freestyle	3:43.75	NR	James Guy	Great Britain	2 August 2015	World Championships	Kazan, Russia	
800 m freestyle	7:50.52		Timothy Shuttleworth	Great Britain	20 May 2016	European Championships	London, United Kingdom	
1500 m freestyle	14:54.75		Toby Robinson	Loughborough University	4 April 2024	British Championships	London, United Kingdom	
50 m backstroke	24.04	ss (Note: Swum in an Adidas Hydrofoil), CR	Liam Tancock	Great Britain	2 August 2009	World Championships	Rome, Italy	
100 m backstroke	52.12	NR	Oliver Morgan	University of Birmingham	17 April 2025	British Championships	London, United Kingdom	
200 m backstroke	1:54.43	sf, NR	Luke Greenbank	Great Britain	21 May 2021	European Championships	Budapest, Hungary	
50 m breaststroke	25.95	sf, WR	Adam Peaty	Great Britain	25 July 2017	World Championships	Budapest, Hungary	
100 m breaststroke	56.88	sf, WR	Adam Peaty	Great Britain	21 July 2019	World Championships	Gwangju, South Korea	
200 m breaststroke	2:07.32		Filip Nowacki	Great Britain	22 August 2025	World Junior Championships	Otopeni, Romania	
50 m butterfly	22.74	sf, NR	Ben Proud	Great Britain	27 July 2025	World Championships	Singapore, Singapore	
50 m butterfly	22.32	unofficial	Ben Proud	Great Britain	24 May 2026	Enhanced Games	Las Vegas, United States	
100 m butterfly	50.67	sf, NR	James Guy	Great Britain	28 July 2017	World Championships	Budapest, Hungary	
200 m butterfly	1:54.58	sf, ss, NR	Michael Rock	Great Britain	28 July 2009	World Championships	Rome, Italy	
200 m individual medley	1:56.07		Tom Dean	Great Britain	27 July 2023	World Championships	Fukuoka, Japan	
400 m individual medley	4:08.85	NR	Max Litchfield	Great Britain	28 July 2024	Olympic Games	Paris, France	
4 × 100 m freestyle relay	3:11.62	h, ss	Adam Brown (49.01); Simon Burnett (47.57); Liam Tancock (47.74); Ross Davenport (47.30)	Great Britain	26 July 2009	World Championships	Rome, Italy	
4 × 200 m freestyle relay	7:04.00		James Guy (1:46.31); Jacob Whittle (1:46.80); Joe Litchfield (1:47.36); Tom Dean (1:43.53)	Great Britain	23 June 2022	World Championships	Budapest, Hungary	
4 × 100 m medley relay	3:30.67		Chris Walker-Hebborn (53.23); Adam Peaty (57.74); James Guy (51.62); Ben Proud (48.08)	Great Britain	9 August 2015	World Championships	Kazan, Russia	

Legend: # – Record awaiting ratification by Swim England; WR – World record; ER – European record; CR – Commonwealth record; NR – British record; ss – set in a now banned super suit; e – equalled existing record;
Records not set in finals: h – heat; sf – semifinal; r – relay 1st leg; rh – relay heat 1st leg; b – B final; † – en route to final mark; so – swim-off; tt – time trial

=== Women ===
List of English women's long course swimming records
Event	Time		Name	Club	Date	Meet	Location	Ref
50 m freestyle	23.96	NR	Fran Halsall	England	26 July 2014	Commonwealth Games	Glasgow, United Kingdom	
100 m freestyle	52.75	h, NR	Anna Hopkin	Great Britain	28 July 2021	Olympic Games	Tokyo, Japan	
200 m freestyle	1:54.34	NR	Freya Colbert	Loughborough Performance	16 April 2026	British Championships	London, United Kingdom	
400 m freestyle	4:00.60	ss (Note: Swum in an Adidas Hydrofoil), NR	Joanne Jackson	Great Britain	26 July 2009	World Championships	Rome, Italy	
800 m freestyle	8:14.10	NR	Rebecca Adlington	Great Britain	16 August 2008	Olympic Games	Beijing, China	
1500 m freestyle	16:06.67		Keri-anne Payne	Stockport Metro	7 March 2011	British Championships	Manchester, United Kingdom	
50 m backstroke	27.15	=, NR	Lauren Cox	Great Britain	24 May 2025	AP Race London International	London, United Kingdom	
50 m backstroke	27.15	=, NR	Lauren Cox	Great Britain	13 August 2026	European Championships	Paris, France	
100 m backstroke	58.12	ss (Note: Swum in a LZR Racer)	Gemma Spofforth	Great Britain	28 July 2009	World Championships	Rome, Italy	
200 m backstroke	2:06.66	ss (Note: Swum in a LZR Racer), NR	Gemma Spofforth	Great Britain	1 August 2009	World Championships	Rome, Italy	
50 m breaststroke	30.02	NR	Imogen Clark	England	30 July 2022	Commonwealth Games	Birmingham, United Kingdom	
100 m breaststroke	1:05.54		Angharad Evans	University of Stirling	26 May 2024	AP Race London International	London, United Kingdom	
200 m breaststroke	2:20.89	NR	Molly Renshaw	Loughborough NC	15 April 2021	British Swimming Selection Trials	London, United Kingdom	
50 m butterfly	25.20	CR	Fran Halsall	England	27 July 2014	Commonwealth Games	Glasgow, United Kingdom	
100 m butterfly	57.25	NR	Ellen Gandy	Beckenham	4 March 2012	British Swimming Selection Trials	London, United Kingdom	
200 m butterfly	2:04.83	ss, NR	Ellen Gandy	Beckenham	19 March 2009	British Championships	Sheffield, United Kingdom	
200 m individual medley	2:06.88	NR	Siobhan-Marie O'Connor	Great Britain	9 August 2016	Olympic Games	Rio de Janeiro, Brazil	
400 m individual medley	4:33.01		Aimee Willmott	England	24 July 2014	Commonwealth Games	Glasgow, United Kingdom	
4 × 100 m freestyle relay	3:35.66		Eva Okaro (54.50); Freya Colbert (53.41); Leah Schlosshan (53.97); Freya Anderson (53.78)	England	24 July 2026	Commonwealth Games	Glasgow, United Kingdom	
4 × 200 m freestyle relay	7:45.93		Freya Colbert (1:55.65); Abbie Wood (1:56.72); Leah Schlosshan (1:56.80); Freya Anderson (1:56.76)	Great Britain	10 August 2026	European Championships	Paris, France	
4 × 100 m medley relay	3:57.03		Lauren Quigley (1:00.17); Sophie Taylor (1:06.39); Siobhan-Marie O'Connor (57.89); Fran Halsall (52.58)	England	29 July 2014	Commonwealth Games	Glasgow, United Kingdom	

Legend: # – Record awaiting ratification by Swim England; WR – World record; ER – European record; CR – Commonwealth record; NR – British record; ss – set in a now banned super suit; e – equalled existing record;
Records not set in finals: h – heat; sf – semifinal; r – relay 1st leg; rh – relay heat 1st leg; b – B final; † – en route to final mark; so – swim-off; tt – time trial

=== Mixed relay ===
List of English mixed relay long course swimming records
Event	Time		Name	Club	Date	Meet	Location	Ref
4 × 100 m freestyle relay	3:22.44		Tom Dean (48.25); Lewis Burras (47.86); Anna Hopkin (53.27); Freya Anderson (53.06)	Great Britain	24 June 2022	World Championships	Budapest, Hungary	
4 × 200 m freestyle relay	7:26.67	NR	Tom Dean (1:46.54); James Guy (1:45.43); Abbie Wood (1:56.67); Freya Anderson (1:58.03)	Great Britain	18 May 2021	European Championships	Budapest, Hungary	
4 × 100 m medley relay	3:41.71		Chris Walker-Hebborn (52.94); Adam Peaty (57.98); Siobhan-Marie O'Connor (57.02); Fran Halsall (53.77)	Great Britain	5 August 2015	World Championships	Kazan, Russia	

Legend: # – Record awaiting ratification by Swim England; WR – World record; ER – European record; CR – Commonwealth record; NR – British record; ss – set in a now banned super suit; e – equalled existing record;
Records not set in finals: h – heat; sf – semifinal; r – relay 1st leg; rh – relay heat 1st leg; b – B final; † – en route to final mark; so – swim-off; tt – time trial

== Short course (25 m) ==
=== Men ===
List of English men's short course swimming records
Event	Time		Name	Club	Date	Meet	Location	Ref
50 m freestyle	20.18	ER	Ben Proud	Great Britain	7 December 2023	European Championships	Otopeni, Romania	
100 m freestyle	45.97	r	Ben Proud	Plymouth Leander	20 December 2015	ASA National Winter Meet	Sheffield, United Kingdom	
200 m freestyle	1:40.86		Tom Dean	Great Britain	18 December 2022	World Championships	Melbourne, Australia	
400 m freestyle	3:36.35		James Guy	Great Britain	5 December 2014	World Championships	Doha, Qatar	
800 m freestyle	7:38.92	†	Timothy Shuttleworth	Loughborough University	17 December 2016	ASA National Winter Meet	Sheffield, United Kingdom	
1500 m freestyle	14:24.00	NR	Timothy Shuttleworth	Loughborough University	17 December 2016	ASA National Winter Meet	Sheffield, United Kingdom	
50 m backstroke	22.85	NR	Oliver Morgan	Great Britain	7 December 2025	European Championships	Lublin, Poland	
100 m backstroke	49.55	h, NR	Oliver Morgan	Great Britain	4 December 2025	European Championships	Lublin, Poland	
200 m backstroke	1:48.36	NR	Cameron Brooker	Bath PC	11 December 2025	Swim England National Winter Championships	Sheffield, United Kingdom	
50 m breaststroke	25.41	NR	Adam Peaty	London Roar	22 November 2020	International Swimming League	Budapest, Hungary	
100 m breaststroke	55.41	CR	Adam Peaty	London Roar	22 November 2020	International Swimming League	Budapest, Hungary	
200 m breaststroke	2:02.71		Andrew Willis	Great Britain	8 December 2016	World Championships	Windsor, Canada	
50 m butterfly	22.10	NR	Jacob Peters	Great Britain	9 December 2023	European Championships	Otopeni, Romania	
100 m butterfly	49.21	sf, NR	Adam Barrett	Great Britain	7 December 2016	World Championships	Windsor, Canada	
200 m butterfly	1:50.64	NR	Edward Mildred	Manchester PC	14 December 2025	Swim England National Winter Championships	Sheffield, United Kingdom	
100 m individual medley	52.03		Joe Litchfield	Great Britain	10 December 2023	European Championships	Otopeni, Romania	
200 m individual medley	1:52.57		James Goddard	Great Britain	23 October 2011	World Cup	Berlin, Germany	
400 m individual medley	4:00.18		Max Litchfield	Dearne Valley	16 December 2018	Swim England National Winter Championships	Sheffield, United Kingdom	
4 × 50 m freestyle relay	1:25.41	ss	Craig Gibbons (21.49); Charles Turner (21.37); Ian Hulme (21.18); Matthew Clay (21.37)	Great Britain	13 December 2009	European Championships	Istanbul, Turkey	
4 × 100 m freestyle relay	3:11.04	ss	Ben Hockin (48.10); Craig Gibbons (47.72); Matthew Clay (47.96); Ross Davenport (47.26)	Great Britain	9 April 2008	World Championships	Manchester, United Kingdom	
4 × 200 m freestyle relay	7:03.06		Edward Sinclair (1:45.81); Marc Spackman (1:46.71); Paul Palmer (1:44.66); James Salter (1:45.88)	Great Britain	17 March 2000	World Championships	Athens, Greece	
4 × 50 m medley relay	1:32.30	NR	Chris Walker-Hebborn (23.31); Adam Peaty (25.71); Adam Barrett (22.23); Ben Proud (21.05)	Great Britain	4 December 2014	World Championships	Doha, Qatar	
4 × 100 m medley relay	3:22.78	NR	Chris Walker-Hebborn (50.57); Adam Peaty (56.23); Adam Barrett (49.01); Ben Proud (46.97)	Great Britain	7 December 2014	World Championships	Doha, Qatar	

Legend: # – Record awaiting ratification by Swim England; WR – World record; ER – European record; CR – Commonwealth record; NR – British record; ss – set in a now banned super suit; e – equalled existing record;
Records not set in finals: h – heat; sf – semifinal; r – relay 1st leg; rh – relay heat 1st leg; b – B final; † – en route to final mark; so – swim-off; tt – time trial

=== Women ===
List of English women's short course swimming records
Event	Time		Name	Club	Date	Meet	Location	Ref
50 m freestyle	23.44	ss (Note: Swum in an Arena X-Glide), NR	Fran Halsall	European Select Team	19 December 2009	Duel in the Pool	Manchester, United Kingdom	
100 m freestyle	51.19	ss, NR	Fran Halsall	Great Britain	22 November 2009	World Cup	Singapore, Singapore	
200 m freestyle	1:51.87	NR	Freya Anderson	London Roar	22 November 2020	International Swimming League	Budapest, Hungary	
400 m freestyle	3:54.92	ss, NR	Joanne Jackson	Loughborough University	8 August 2009	British Grand Prix	Leeds, United Kingdom	
800 m freestyle	8:08.25	ss	Rebecca Adlington	Great Britain	10 April 2008	World Championships	Manchester, United Kingdom	
1500 m freestyle	15:46.15	NR	Fleur Lewis	Loughborough University	17 November 2023	BUCS Championships	Sheffield, United Kingdom	
50 m backstroke	26.03	NR	Lauren Cox	Great Britain	7 December 2025	European Championships	Lublin, Poland	
100 m backstroke	56.35	NR	Lizzie Simmonds	Bath University	17 December 2015	ASA National Winter Meet	Sheffield, United Kingdom	
200 m backstroke	2:00.83	NR	Lizzie Simmonds	European All-Stars	16 December 2011	Duel in the Pool	Atlanta, United States	
50 m breaststroke	29.17	NR	Imogen Clark	Derby Excel	16 December 2023	Swim England National Winter Championships	Sheffield, United Kingdom	
100 m breaststroke	1:04.37		Molly Renshaw	Great Britain	20 December 2021	World Championships	Abu Dhabi, United Arab Emirates	
200 m breaststroke	2:17.10	NR	Jocelyn Ulyett	Loughborough University	6 December 2019	Swim England National Winter Championships	Sheffield, United Kingdom	
50 m butterfly	25.29	NR	Fran Halsall	Great Britain	29 October 2014	World Cup	Tokyo, Japan	
100 m butterfly	55.71	ss, NR	Fran Halsall	European Select Team	18 December 2009	Duel in the Pool	Manchester, United Kingdom	
200 m butterfly	2:04.62		Emily Richards	Great Britain	7 December 2025	European Championships	Lublin, Poland	
100 m individual medley	57.59	sf, NR	Siobhan-Marie O'Connor	Great Britain	3 December 2015	European Championships	Netanya, Israel	
200 m individual medley	2:02.75	CR	Abbie Wood	Great Britain	10 December 2024	World Championships	Budapest, Hungary	
400 m individual medley	4:24.34		Abbie Wood	Great Britain	14 December 2024	World Championships	Budapest, Hungary	
4 × 50 m freestyle relay	1:37.11		Anna Hopkin (23.94); Isabella Hindley (24.37); Imogen Clark (24.18); Abbie Wood (24.62)	Great Britain	15 December 2022	World Championships	Melbourne, Australia	
4 × 100 m freestyle relay	3:37.63		Rebecca Turner (54.28); Maya Westlake (54.24); Darcy Deakin (55.44); Ellie Faulkner (53.67)	City of Sheffield	18 December 2015	ASA National Winter Meet	Sheffield, United Kingdom	
4 × 200 m freestyle relay	7:47.14	tt	Karen Legg (1:57.18); Janine Belton (1:58.51); Nicola Jackson (1:55.59); Karen Pickering (1:55.86)	Great Britain	10 August 2001	British Championships	Norwich, United Kingdom	
4 × 50 m medley relay	1:48.26		Lizzie Simmonds (28.12); Kate Haywood (30.21); Rosalind Brett (26.05); Fran Halsall (23.88)	Great Britain	9 December 2006	European Championships	Helsinki, Finland	
4 × 100 m medley relay	4:00.37		Katelyn Bergin (1.00.18); Katie Matts (1.07.09); Holly Hibbott (58.67); Emma Gage (54.43)	Stockport Metro	17 December 2016	ASA National Winter Meet	Sheffield, United Kingdom	

Legend: # – Record awaiting ratification by Swim England; WR – World record; ER – European record; CR – Commonwealth record; NR – British record; ss – set in a now banned super suit; e – equalled existing record;
Records not set in finals: h – heat; sf – semifinal; r – relay 1st leg; rh – relay heat 1st leg; b – B final; † – en route to final mark; so – swim-off; tt – time trial

=== Mixed relay ===
List of English mixed relay short course swimming records
Event	Time	Name	Club	Date	Meet	Location	Ref
4 × 50 m freestyle relay							
4 × 50 m medley relay	1:37.46	Chris Walker-Hebborn (23.42); Adam Peaty (25.89); Siobhan-Marie O'Connor (25.10); Fran Halsall (23.05)	Great Britain	4 December 2014	World Championships	Doha, Qatar	
4 × 100 m medley relay							

Legend: # – Record awaiting ratification by Swim England; WR – World record; ER – European record; CR – Commonwealth record; NR – British record; ss – set in a now banned super suit; e – equalled existing record;
Records not set in finals: h – heat; sf – semifinal; r – relay 1st leg; rh – relay heat 1st leg; b – B final; † – en route to final mark; so – swim-off; tt – time trial

== Multiple record holders ==
=== By athlete (men) ===
List of multiple male English swimming record holders
Record count	Name (last record)	Events
9	Adam Ramsay-Peaty (2020)	50 m breaststroke LC; 100 m breaststroke LC; 4 × 100 m medley relay LC; Mixed 4 × 100 m medley relay LC; 50 m breaststroke SC; 100 m breaststroke SC; 4 × 50 m medley relay SC; 4 × 100 m medley relay SC; Mixed 4 × 50 m medley relay SC
7	Ben Proud (2025)	50 m freestyle LC; 50 m butterfly LC; 4 × 100 m medley relay LC; 50 m freestyle SC; 100 m freestyle SC; 4 × 50 m medley relay SC; 4 × 100 m medley relay SC
6	Tom Dean (2023)	200 m freestyle LC; 200 m individual medley LC; 4 × 200 m freestyle relay LC; Mixed 4 × 100 m freestyle relay LC; Mixed 4 × 200 m freestyle relay LC; 200 m freestyle SC
6	James Guy (2022)	400 m freestyle LC; 100 m butterfly LC; 4 × 200 m freestyle relay LC; 4 × 100 m medley relay LC; Mixed 4 × 200 m freestyle relay LC; 400 m freestyle SC
5	Chris Walker-Hebborn (2015)	4 × 100 m medley relay LC; Mixed 4 × 100 m medley relay LC; 4 × 50 m medley relay SC; 4 × 100 m medley relay SC; Mixed 4 × 50 m medley relay SC
3	Timothy Shuttleworth (2016)	800 m freestyle LC; 800 m freestyle SC; 1500 m freestyle SC
3	Oliver Morgan (2025)	100 m backstroke LC; 50 m backstroke SC; 100 m backstroke SC
3	Adam Barrett (2016)	100 m butterfly SC; 4 × 50 m medley relay SC; 4 × 100 m medley relay SC
2	Lewis Burras (2022)	100 m freestyle LC; Mixed 4 × 100 m medley relay LC
2	Liam Tancock (2009)	50 m backstroke LC; 4 × 100 m freestyle relay LC
2	Max Litchfield (2024)	400 m individual medley LC; 400 m individual medley SC
2	Ross Davenport (2009)	4 × 100 m freestyle relay LC; 4 × 100 m freestyle relay SC
2	Joe Litchfield (2023)	4 × 200 m freestyle relay LC; 100 m individual medley SC
2	Craig Gibbons (2009)	4 × 50 m freestyle relay SC; 4 × 100 m freestyle relay SC
2	Matthew Clay (2009)	4 × 50 m freestyle relay SC; 4 × 100 m freestyle relay SC

=== By athlete (women) ===
List of multiple female English swimming record holders
Record count	Name (last record)	Events
11	Fran Halsall (2015)	50 m freestyle LC; 50 m butterfly LC; 4 × 100 m freestyle relay LC; 4 × 100 m medley relay LC; Mixed 4 × 100 m medley relay LC; 50 m freestyle SC; 100 m freestyle SC; 50 m butterfly SC; 100 m butterfly SC; 4 × 50 m medley relay SC; Mixed 4 × 50 m medley relay SC
7	Siobhan-Marie O'Connor (2016)	200 m individual medley LC; 4 × 100 m freestyle relay LC; 4 × 200 m freestyle relay LC; 4 × 100 m medley relay LC; Mixed 4 × 100 m medley relay LC; 100 m individual medley SC; Mixed 4 × 50 m medley relay SC
4	Abbie Wood (2024)	Mixed 4 × 200 m freestyle relay LC; 200 m individual medley SC; 400 m individual medley SC; 4 × 50 m freestyle relay SC
3	Anna Hopkin (2022)	100 m freestyle LC; Mixed 4 × 100 m medley relay LC; 4 × 50 m freestyle relay SC
3	Imogen Clark (2023)	50 m breaststroke LC; 50 m breaststroke SC; 4 × 50 m freestyle relay SC
3	Rebecca Turner (2015)	4 × 100 m freestyle relay LC; 4 × 200 m freestyle relay LC; 4 × 100 m freestyle relay SC
3	Freya Anderson (2022)	Mixed 4 × 100 m freestyle relay LC; Mixed 4 × 200 m freestyle relay LC; 200 m freestyle SC
3	Lizzie Simmonds (2015)	100 m backstroke SC; 200 m backstroke SC; 4 × 50 m medley relay SC
2	Joanne Jackson (2009)	400 m freestyle LC; 400 m freestyle SC
2	Rebecca Adlington (2008)	800 m freestyle LC; 800 m freestyle SC
2	Lauren Cox (2025)	50 m backstroke LC; 50 m backstroke SC
2	Gemma Spofforth (2009)	100 m backstroke LC; 200 m backstroke LC
2	Molly Renshaw (2021)	200 m breaststroke LC; 100 m breaststroke SC
2	Ellen Gandy (2012)	100 m butterfly LC; 200 m butterfly LC
2	Ellie Faulkner (2015)	4 × 200 m freestyle relay LC; 4 × 100 m freestyle relay SC
