= Lyubov Korol' =

Ukrainian swimmer

Personal information
- Nationality: Ukrainian
- Born: 11 March 1989 (age 37) Zaporizhya, Ukraine

Sport
- Sport: Swimming
- Strokes: Butterfly
Medal record
Women's swimming
Representing Ukraine
World Junior Championships
Gold medal – first place	2006 Rio de Janeiro	50 m butterfly
Bronze medal – third place	2006 Rio de Janeiro	4x100 m freestyle relay
European Junior Championships
Gold medal – first place	2005 Budapest	50 m butterfly

Lyubov Korol' (Ukrainian: Любов Король, born 11 March 1989 in Zaporizhzhia, Ukraine) is a retired Ukrainian swimmer. She is multiple medalist at the 2006 World Youth Championships and a gold medalist in 50 m butterfly at the 2005 European Junior Championships. She is a competitor of 2008 European Short Course Swimming Championships in butterfly and medley relays events without reaching any medals.
