= 2006 European Short Course Swimming Championships =

Water sport competitions

- Host city: Helsinki, Finland
- Date: 7–10 December 2006
- Venue: Mäkelänrinne Swimming Center

The European Short Course Swimming Championships 2006 were held in the Finnish capital, Helsinki, from Thursday 7 to Sunday 10 December. The venue of the event was the aquatic center of Mäkelänrinteen uintikeskus, which last hosted a major event at the pre-Olympic 2000 European Aquatics Championships.

Three world records (two in relays) and eight European records were broken during the event.

== Medal table ==
* Host nation (Finland)

Rank	Nation	Gold	Silver	Bronze	Total
1	Germany (GER)	6	6	3	15
2	France (FRA)	5	3	3	11
3	Italy (ITA)	4	3	2	9
4	Russia (RUS)	4	1	4	9
5	Poland (POL)	3	5	4	12
6	Ukraine (UKR)	3	4	1	8
7	Sweden (SWE)	3	3	3	9
8	Hungary (HUN)	2	3	1	6
8	Netherlands (NED)	2	3	1	6
10	Great Britain (GBR)	1	2	5	8
11	Finland (FIN)*	1	1	1	3
12	Serbia (SRB)	1	1	0	2
12	Slovenia (SLO)	1	1	0	2
14	Spain (ESP)	1	0	1	2
15	Croatia (CRO)	1	0	0	1
16	Lithuania (LTU)	0	2	0	2
17	Norway (NOR)	0	0	2	2
17	Slovakia (SVK)	0	0	2	2
19	Belarus (BLR)	0	0	1	1
19	Greece (GRE)	0	0	1	1
19	Iceland (ISL)	0	0	1	1
19	Israel (ISR)	0	0	1	1
19	Romania (ROM)	0	0	1	1
Totals (23 entries)		38	38	38	114

== Medal summary ==
=== Men's events ===
Event	Gold		Silver		Bronze	
50 m freestyle	Eduardo Lorente; Spain	21.53	Milorad Čavić; Serbia	21.60	Julien Sicot; France	21.68
100 m freestyle	Filippo Magnini; Italy	46.81	Stefan Nystrand; Sweden	47.05	Alain Bernard; France	47.24
200 m freestyle	Filippo Magnini; Italy	1:42.54	Massimiliano Rosolino; Italy	1:44.17	Paweł Korzeniowski; Poland	1:44.41
400 m freestyle	Yury Prilukov; Russia	3:39.02	Przemysław Stańczyk; Poland	3:39.92	Paweł Korzeniowski; Poland	3:40.40
1500 m freestyle	Yury Prilukov; Russia	14:16.13; ER	Mateusz Sawrymowicz; Poland	14:28.43	Sébastien Rouault; France	14:39.06
50 m backstroke	Helge Meeuw; Germany	23.70	Thomas Rupprath; Germany	23.92	Ľuboš Križko; Slovakia	24.19
100 m backstroke	Arkady Vyatchanin; Russia	51.11	Helge Meeuw; Germany	51.16	Thomas Rupprath; Germany	52.02
200 m backstroke	Arkady Vyatchanin; Russia	1:49.98; ER	Helge Meeuw; Germany	1:53.45	Răzvan Florea; Romania	1:53.71; NR
50 m breaststroke	Oleg Lisogor; Ukraine	26.50; CR	Alessandro Terrin; Italy	26.92	Darren Mew; Great Britain	27.23
100 m breaststroke	Oleg Lisogor; Ukraine	58.14	Valeriy Dymo; Ukraine	58.64	Alexander Dale Oen; Norway	58.70
200 m breaststroke	Dániel Gyurta; Hungary	2:06.58	Sławomir Kuczko; Poland	2:06.61	Paolo Bossini; Italy	2:07.13
50 m butterfly	Alexei Puninski; Croatia	23.21	Thomas Rupprath; Germany	23.34	Örn Arnarson; Iceland	23.55
100 m butterfly	Milorad Čavić; Serbia	50.63	Peter Mankoč; Slovenia	50.78	Nikolay Skvortsov; Russia	51.17
200 m butterfly	Paweł Korzeniowski; Poland	1:52.33	László Cseh; Hungary	1:53.08	Nikolay Skvortsov; Russia	1:53.10
100 m individual medley	Peter Mankoč; Slovenia	53.05	Vytautas Janušaitis; Lithuania	53.66	Aleksander Hetland; Norway	53.70
200 m individual medley	László Cseh; Hungary	1:54.43	Vytautas Janušaitis; Lithuania	1:56.20	Tamás Kerékjártó; Hungary	1:57.12
400 m individual medley	Luca Marin; Italy	4:01.71	László Cseh; Hungary	4:03.39	Ioannis Drymonakos; Greece	4:05.94
4 × 50 m freestyle relay	Sweden; Stefan Nystrand; Petter Stymne; Marcus Piehl; Jonas Tilly	1:24.89; WBT	France; Frédérick Bousquet; Julien Sicot; David Maître; Alain Bernard	1:25.16	Netherlands; Johan Kenkhuis; Bas van Velthoven; Robin van Aggele; Mitja Zastrow	1:26.03
4 × 50 m medley relay	Germany; Helge Meeuw; Johannes Neumann; Thomas Rupprath; Jens Schreiber	1:34.06; WBT	Finland; Tero Räty; Jarno Pihlava; Jere Hård; Matti Rajakylä	1:34.95	Italy; Cesare Pizzirani; Alessandro Terrin; Rudy Goldin; Filippo Magnini	1:35.20

=== Women's events ===
Event	Gold		Silver		Bronze	
50 m freestyle	Marleen Veldhuis; Netherlands	23.69; CR	Therese Alshammar; Sweden	23.76	Hanna-Maria Seppälä; Finland	24.57
100 m freestyle	Marleen Veldhuis; Netherlands	52.41; CR	Alena Popchanka; France	52.91	Josefin Lillhage; Sweden	53.09
200 m freestyle	Alena Popchanka; France	1:54.25; ER	Otylia Jędrzejczak; Poland	1:54.39	Josefin Lillhage; Sweden	1:54.75
400 m freestyle	Laure Manaudou; France	3:56.09; WR	Federica Pellegrini; Italy	3:59.96	Joanne Jackson; Great Britain	4:01.48
800 m freestyle	Laure Manaudou; France	8:12.24	Anastasia Ivanenko; Russia	8:18.90	Erika Villaécija García; Spain	8:20.09
50 m backstroke	Janine Pietsch; Germany	27.32	Iryna Amshennikova; Ukraine	27.44	Anna Gostomelsky; Israel	27.50
100 m backstroke	Laure Manaudou; France	57.87	Antje Buschschulte; Germany	58.20	Iryna Amshennikova; Ukraine	59.03
200 m backstroke	Esther Baron; France	2:04.08; ER	Iryna Amshennikova; Ukraine	2:04.57	Elizabeth Simmonds; Great Britain	2:05.93
50 m breaststroke	Janne Schäfer; Germany	30.43	Kate Haywood; Great Britain	30.88	Elena Bogomazova; Russia	30.98
100 m breaststroke	Anna Khlistunova; Ukraine	1:05.73	Kirsty Balfour; Great Britain	1:06.57	Janne Schäfer; Germany	1:07.32
200 m breaststroke	Kirsty Balfour; Great Britain	2:21.82	Anne Poleska; Germany	2:23.12	Beata Kamińska; Poland	2:24.87
50 m butterfly	Therese Alshammar; Sweden	25.36; CR	Inge Dekker; Netherlands	25.60	Anna-Karin Kammerling; Sweden	25.92
100 m butterfly	Antje Buschschulte; Germany	56.94	Inge Dekker; Netherlands	57.19	Martina Moravcová; Slovakia	57.69
200 m butterfly	Otylia Jędrzejczak; Poland	2:04.94; ER	Beatrix Boulsevicz; Hungary	2:06.73	Jessica Dickons; Great Britain	2:07.36
100 m individual medley	Hanna-Maria Seppälä; Finland	1:00.45	Ganna Dzerkal; Ukraine	1:00.50	Svitlana Khakhlova; Belarus	1:00.78
200 m individual medley	Katarzyna Baranowska; Poland	2:09.47	Camille Muffat; France	2:10.83	Aleksandra Urbańczyk; Poland	2:10.89
400 m individual medley	Alessia Filippi; Italy	4:31.58	Katarzyna Baranowska; Poland	4:32.78	Anastasia Ivanenko; Russia	4:33.46
4 × 50 m freestyle relay	Sweden; Magdalena Kuras; Therese Alshammar; Anna-Karin Kammerling; Josefin Lillhage	1:36.61	Netherlands; Inge Dekker; Saskia de Jonge; Chantal Groot; Marleen Veldhuis	1:37.27	Germany; Daniela Samulski; Daniela Götz; Meike Freitag; Annika Lurz	1:38.50
4 × 50 m medley relay	Germany; Janine Pietsch; Janne Schäfer; Antje Buschschulte; Daniela Samulski	1:47.55	Sweden; Therese Alshammar; Rebecca Ejdervik; Anna-Karin Kammerling; Josefin Lillhage	1:48.14	Great Britain; Elizabeth Simmonds; Kate Haywood; Rosalind Brett; Francesca Halsall	1:48.26

== Results ==
Record information was correct before the Championships started.

=== Men's events ===
==== 50 m freestyle ====
Rec.	Names	Nation	Time
WR	Roland Mark Schoeman	RSA	20.98
ER	Frédérick Bousquet	FRA	21.10
CR	Stefan Nystrand	SWE	21.15
Pos.	Names	Nation	Time
1st place, gold medalist(s)	Eduard Lorente Ginesta	ESP	21.53
2nd place, silver medalist(s)	Milorad Čavić	SRB	21.60
3rd place, bronze medalist(s)	Julien Sicot	FRA	21.68
4	Alexei Puninski	CRO	21.73
5	Steffen Deibler	GER	21.79
6	Oleksandr Volynets	UKR	21.86
7	Johan Kenkhuis	NED	21.87
8	Matti Rajakylä	FIN	21.97

==== 100 m freestyle ====
Rec.	Names	Nation	Time
WR	Ian Crocker	USA	46.25
WR	Roland Mark Schoeman	RSA	46.25
ER	Filippo Magnini	ITA	46.52
CR	Filippo Magnini	ITA	46.52
Pos.	Names	Nation	Time
1st place, gold medalist(s)	Filippo Magnini	ITA	46.81
2nd place, silver medalist(s)	Stefan Nystrand	SWE	47.05
3rd place, bronze medalist(s)	Alain Bernard	FRA	47.24
4	Fabien Gilot	FRA	47.76
5	Stanislau Neviarouski	BLR	47.90
6	Alexei Puninski	CRO	48.19
7	Andrey Grechin	RUS	48.35
8	Matti Rajakylä	FIN	48.51

==== 200 m freestyle ====
Rec.	Names	Nation	Time
WR	Ian Thorpe	AUS	1:41.10
ER	Pieter van den Hoogenband	NED	1:41.89
CR	Pieter van den Hoogenband	NED	1:41.89
Pos.	Names	Nation	Time
1st place, gold medalist(s)	Filippo Magnini	ITA	1:42.54
2nd place, silver medalist(s)	Massimiliano Rosolino	ITA	1:44.17
3rd place, bronze medalist(s)	Paweł Korzeniowski	POL	1:44.41
4	Květoslav Svoboda	CZE	1:45.22
5	Stefan Herbst	GER	1:45.45
6	Shal Livnat	ISR	1:45.64
7	Fabien Gilot	FRA	1:45.84
8	Paul Biedermann	GER	1:45.88

==== 400 m freestyle ====
Rec.	Names	Nation	Time
WR	Grant Hackett	AUS	3:34.58
ER	Yury Prilukov	RUS	3:37.81
CR	Yury Prilukov	RUS	3:37.81
Pos.	Names	Nation	Time
1st place, gold medalist(s)	Yury Prilukov	RUS	3:39.02
2nd place, silver medalist(s)	Przemysław Stańczyk	POL	3:39.92
3rd place, bronze medalist(s)	Paweł Korzeniowski	POL	3:40.40
4	Massimiliano Rosolino	ITA	3:41.60
5	Květoslav Svoboda	CZE	3:42.89
6	Paul Biedermann	GER	3:43.24
7	Federico Colbertaldo	ITA	3:43.37
8	Nikolaos Xylouris	GRE	3:44.82

==== 1500 m freestyle ====
Rec.	Names	Nation	Time
WR	Grant Hackett	AUS	14:10.10
ER	Yury Prilukov	RUS	14:23.92
CR	Yury Prilukov	RUS	14:27.12
Pos.	Names	Nation	Time
1st place, gold medalist(s)	Yury Prilukov	RUS	14:16.13 (ER)
2nd place, silver medalist(s)	Mateusz Sawrymowicz	POL	14:28.43
3rd place, bronze medalist(s)	Sébastien Rouault	FRA	14:39.06
4	Nikita Lobintsev	RUS	14:39.60
5	David Davies	GBR	14:40.65
6	Dávid Verrasztó	HUN	14:44.56
7	Federico Colbertaldo	ITA	14:45.41
8	Maciej Hreniak	POL	14:46.21

==== 50 m backstroke ====
Rec.	Names	Nation	Time
WR	Thomas Rupprath	GER	23.27
ER	Thomas Rupprath	GER	23.27
CR	Thomas Rupprath	GER	23.27
Pos.	Names	Nation	Time
1st place, gold medalist(s)	Helge Meeuw	GER	23.70
2nd place, silver medalist(s)	Thomas Rupprath	GER	23.92
3rd place, bronze medalist(s)	Ľuboš Križko	SVK	24.19
4	Liam Tancock	GBR	24.25
5	Ivan Tolić	CRO	24.32
6	Arkady Vyatchanin	RUS	24.38
7	Tero Räty	FIN	24.46
8	Stanislav Donets	RUS	24.75

==== 100 m backstroke ====
Rec.	Names	Nation	Time
WR	Ryan Lochte	USA	49.99
ER	Thomas Rupprath	GER	50.58
CR	Thomas Rupprath	GER	50.72
Pos.	Names	Nation	Time
1st place, gold medalist(s)	Arkady Vyatchanin	RUS	51.11
2nd place, silver medalist(s)	Helge Meeuw	GER	51.16
3rd place, bronze medalist(s)	Thomas Rupprath	GER	52.02
4	Gregor Tait	GBR	52.48
5	Stanislav Donets	RUS	52.75
6	Matthew Clay	GBR	52.78
7	Răzvan Florea	ROM	53.31
8	Nick Driebergen	NED	53.42

==== 200 m backstroke ====
Rec.	Names	Nation	Time
WR	Ryan Lochte	USA	1:49.05
ER	Markus Rogan	AUT	1:50.43
CR	Markus Rogan	AUT	1:50.43
Pos.	Names	Nation	Time
1st place, gold medalist(s)	Arkady Vyatchanin	RUS	1:49.98 (ER)
2nd place, silver medalist(s)	Helge Meeuw	GER	1:53.45
3rd place, bronze medalist(s)	Răzvan Florea	ROM	1:53.71
4	James Goddard	GBR	1:54.30
5	Gregor Tait	GBR	1:54.48
6	Simon Dufour	FRA	1:56.13
7	Luca Marin	ITA	1:56.58
8	Marko Strahija	CRO	1:58.05

==== 50 m breaststroke ====
Rec.	Names	Nation	Time
WR	Oleg Lisogor	UKR	26.17
ER	Oleg Lisogor	UKR	26.17
CR	Oleg Lisogor	UKR	26.57
Pos.	Names	Nation	Time
1st place, gold medalist(s)	Oleg Lisogor	UKR	26.50 (CR)
2nd place, silver medalist(s)	Alessandro Terrin	ITA	26.92
3rd place, bronze medalist(s)	Darren Mew	GBR	27.23
4	Michael Malul	ISR	27.25
5	Emil Tahirovič	SLO	27.27
5	Chris Cook	GBR	27.27
7	Jarno Pihlava	FIN	27.37
7	Alexander Dale Oen	NOR	27.37

==== 100 m breaststroke ====
Rec.	Names	Nation	Time
WR	Ed Moses	USA	57.47
ER	Oleg Lisogor	UKR	57.67
CR	James Gibson	GBR	58.03
Pos.	Names	Nation	Time
1st place, gold medalist(s)	Oleg Lisogor	UKR	58.14
2nd place, silver medalist(s)	Valeriy Dymo	UKR	58.64
3rd place, bronze medalist(s)	Alexander Dale Oen	NOR	58.70
4	Chris Cook	GBR	59.25
5	Alessandro Terrin	ITA	59.42
6	Sergey Geybel	RUS	59.53
7	Sławomir Kuczko	POL	59.76
8	Mariusz Winogrodzki	POL	59.79

==== 200 m breaststroke ====
Rec.	Names	Nation	Time
WR	Ed Moses	USA	2:02.92
ER	Ian Edmond	GBR	2:05.63
CR	Ian Edmond	GBR	2:05.63
Pos.	Names	Nation	Time
1st place, gold medalist(s)	Dániel Gyurta	HUN	2:06.58
2nd place, silver medalist(s)	Sławomir Kuczko	POL	2:06.61
3rd place, bronze medalist(s)	Paolo Bossini	ITA	2:07.13
4	Valeriy Dymo	UKR	2:07.45
5	Oleg Lisogor	UKR	2:07.72
6	Kristopher Gilchrist	GBR	2:09.40
7	Sławomir Wolniak	POL	2:09.62
8	Ákos Molnár	HUN	2:10.34

==== 50 m butterfly ====
Rec.	Names	Nation	Time
WR	Kaio de Almeida	BRA	22.60
ER	Mark Foster	GBR	22.87
CR	Thomas Rupprath	GER	23.05
Pos.	Names	Nation	Time
1st place, gold medalist(s)	Alexei Puninski	CRO	23.21
2nd place, silver medalist(s)	Thomas Rupprath	GER	23.34
3rd place, bronze medalist(s)	Örn Arnarson	ISL	23.55
4	Jere Hård	FIN	23.59
5	Evgeny Korotyshkin	RUS	23.65
5	Steffen Diebler	GER	23.65
7	Sergiy Breus	UKR	23.67
8	Matti Rajakylä	FIN	23.70

==== 100 m butterfly ====
Rec.	Names	Nation	Time
WR	Ian Crocker	USA	49.07
ER	Milorad Čavić	SCG	50.02
CR	Milorad Čavić	SCG	50.02
Pos.	Names	Nation	Time
1st place, gold medalist(s)	Milorad Čavić	SRB	50.63
2nd place, silver medalist(s)	Peter Mankoč	SLO	50.78
3rd place, bronze medalist(s)	Nikolay Skvortsov	RUS	51.17
4	Evgeny Korotyshkin	RUS	51.34
5	Thomas Rupprath	GER	51.43
6	Rudy Goldin	ITA	51.89
7	Andriy Serdinov	RUS	52.00
8	Ioan Gherghel	ROM	52.27

==== 200 m butterfly ====
Rec.	Names	Nation	Time
WR	Franck Esposito	FRA	1:50.73
ER	Franck Esposito	FRA	1:50.73
CR	Paweł Korzeniowski	POL	1:50.89
Pos.	Names	Nation	Time
1st place, gold medalist(s)	Paweł Korzeniowski	POL	1:52.33
2nd place, silver medalist(s)	László Cseh	HUN	1:53.08
3rd place, bronze medalist(s)	Nikolay Skvortsov	RUS	1:53.10
4	Anatoly Polyakov	RUS	1:53.83
5	Ioannis Drymonakos	GRE	1:54.41
6	Ioan Gherghel	ROM	1:54.69
7	Sergiy Advena	UKR	1:55.28
8	Łukasz Drzewiński	POL	1:57.05

==== 100 m individual medley ====
Rec.	Names	Nation	Time
WR	Ryk Neethling	RSA	51.52
ER	Thomas Rupprath	GER	52.58
CR	Peter Mankoč	SLO	52.63
Pos.	Names	Nation	Time
1st place, gold medalist(s)	Peter Mankoč	SLO	53.05
2nd place, silver medalist(s)	Vytautas Janušaitis	LTU	53.66
3rd place, bronze medalist(s)	Aleksander Hetland	NOR	53.70
4	Robin van Aggele	NED	53.79
5	Jani Sievinen	FIN	54.41
6	Martin Liivamägi	EST	54.92
7	Örn Arnarson	ISL	55.04
8	Martti Aljand	EST	55.09

==== 200 m individual medley ====
Rec.	Names	Nation	Time
WR	Ryan Lochte	USA	1:53.31
ER	László Cseh	HUN	1:53.46
CR	László Cseh	HUN	1:53.46
Pos.	Names	Nation	Time
1st place, gold medalist(s)	László Cseh	HUN	1:54.43
2nd place, silver medalist(s)	Vytautas Janušaitis	LTU	1:56.20
3rd place, bronze medalist(s)	Tamás Kerékjártó	HUN	1:57.12
4	Ioannis Kokkodis	GRE	1:57.16
5	Leonardo Tumiotto	ITA	1:57.61
6	Łukasz Wójt	POL	1:58.17
7	Saša Imprić	CRO	1:58.90
8	Martin Liivamägi	EST	1:59.28

==== 400 m individual medley ====
Rec.	Names	Nation	Time
WR	László Cseh	HUN	4:00.37
ER	László Cseh	HUN	4:00.37
CR	László Cseh	HUN	4:00.37
Rec.	Names	Nation	Time
1st place, gold medalist(s)	Luca Marin	ITA	4:01.71
2nd place, silver medalist(s)	László Cseh	HUN	4:03.39
3rd place, bronze medalist(s)	Ioannis Drymonakos	GRE	4:05.94
4	Dávid Verrasztó	HUN	4:09.48
5	Łukasz Wójt	POL	4:09.91
6	Alexey Kovrigin	RUS	4:10.80
7	Mateusz Matczak	POL	4:11.81
8	Andrey Krylov	RUS	4:12.80

==== 4 × 50 m freestyle relay ====
Rec.	Nation/Names	Time
WR	Netherlands	1:25.03
ER	Netherlands	1:25.03
CR	Netherlands	1:25.03
Pos.	Nation/Names	Time
1st place, gold medalist(s)	Sweden	1:24.89 (WR)
	Stefan Nystrand; Petter Stymne; Marcus Piehl; Jonas Tilly	21.36; 21.21; 20.96; 21.36
2nd place, silver medalist(s)	France	1:25.16
	Frédérick Bousquet; Julien Sicot; David Maitre; Alain Bernard	21.99; 21.06; 21.26; 20.85
3rd place, bronze medalist(s)	Netherlands	1:26:03
	Johan Kenkhuis; Bas van Velthoven; Robin van Aggele; Mitja Zastrow	21.82; 21.35; 21.42; 21.44
4	Ukraine	1:27.04
	Oleksandr Volynets; Oleg Lisogor; Andriy Serdinov; Yuriy Yegoshin	21.80; 21.41; 22.40; 21.43
5	Finland	1:27.20
	Jere Hård; Manu Mäntymäki; Jani Rusi; Matti Rajakylä	22.16; 21.78; 21.86; 21.42
6	Great Britain	1:27.56
	Christopher Cozens; Benjamin Hockin; Liam Tancock; Todd Cooper	22.51; 21.91; 21.27; 21.87
7	Russia	1:27.72
	Evgeny Lagunov; Andrey Grechin; Evgeny Korotyshkin; Arkady Vyatchanin	22.42; 21.83; 21.97; 21.50

==== 4 × 50 m medley relay ====
Pos.	Nation/Names	Time
WR	Germany	1:34.46
ER	Germany	1:34.46
CR	Germany	1:34.46
Pos.	Nation/Names	Time
1st place, gold medalist(s)	Germany	1:34.06 (WR)
	Helge Meeuw; Johannes Neumann; Thomas Rupprath; Jens Schreiber	23.66; 26.86; 22.30; 21.24
2nd place, silver medalist(s)	Finland	1:34.95
	Tero Räty; Jarno Pihlava; Jere Hård; Matti Rajakylä	24.58; 26.43; 23.06; 20.88
3rd place, bronze medalist(s)	Italy	1:35.20
	Cesare Pizzirani; Alessandro Terrin; Rudy Goldin; Filippo Magnini	24.83; 26.23; 23.04; 21.10
4	Ukraine	1:35.23
	Andriy Oleynyk; Oleg Lisogor; Sergiy Breus; Oleksandr Volynets	24.90; 25.78; 22.82; 21.73
5	Russia	1:35.84
	Arkady Vyatchanin; Sergey Geybel; Evgeny Korotyshkin; Evgeny Lagunov	24.32; 26.87; 23.21; 21.44
6	Great Britain	1:36.43
	Liam Tancock; Darren Mew; Matthew Clay; Benjamin Hockin	24.30; 26.61; 23.37; 22.15
7	Croatia	1:36.44
	Ivan Tolić; Nikola Delić; Alexei Puninski; Mario Todorović	24.43; 26.95; 23.36; 21.70
8	Netherlands	1:37.06
	Nick Driebergen; Robin van Aggele; Bastiaan Tamminga; Johan Kenkhuis	24.79; 27.11; 23.77; 21.39

=== Women's results ===
==== 50 m freestyle ====
Rec.	Names	Nation	Time
WR	Therese Alshammar	SWE	23.59
ER	Therese Alshammar	SWE	23.59
CR	Inge de Bruijn	NED	23.89
Pos.	Names	Nation	Time
1st place, gold medalist(s)	Marleen Veldhuis	NED	23.69 (CR)
2nd place, silver medalist(s)	Therese Alshammar	SWE	23.76
3rd place, bronze medalist(s)	Hanna-Maria Seppälä	FIN	24.57
4	Francesca Halsall	GBR	24.58
5	Cristina Chiuso	ITA	24.76
6	Svitlana Khakhlova	BLR	24.83
7	Maria Metella	FRA	24.93
8	Magdalena Kuras	SWE	25.01

==== 100 m freestyle ====
Rec.	Names	Nation	Time
WR	Libby Lenton	AUS	51.70
ER	Therese Alshammar	SWE	52.17
CR	Inge de Bruijn	NED	52.65
Pos.	Names	Nation	Time
1st place, gold medalist(s)	Marleen Veldhuis	NED	52.41 (CR)
2nd place, silver medalist(s)	Alena Popchanka	FRA	52.91
3rd place, bronze medalist(s)	Josefin Lillhage	SWE	53.09
4	Hanna-Maria Seppälä	FIN	53.29
5	Daniela Samulski	GER	53.76
6	Francesca Halsall	GBR	53.85
7	Aleksandra Gerasimenya	BLR	54.21
8	Melke Freitag	GER	54.27

==== 200 m freestyle ====
Rec.	Names	Nation	Time
WR	Libby Lenton	AUS	1:53.29
ER	Melanie Marshall	GBR	1:54.53
CR	Martina Moravcová	SVK	1:54.74
Pos.	Names	Nation	Time
1st place, gold medalist(s)	Alena Popchanka	FRA	1:54.25 (ER)
2nd place, silver medalist(s)	Otylia Jędrzejczak	POL	1:54.39
3rd place, bronze medalist(s)	Josefin Lillhage	SWE	1:54.75
4	Annika Lurz	GER	1:55.38
5	Federica Pellegrini	ITA	1:55.51
6	Melke Freitag	GER	1:55.90
7	Joanne Jackson	GBR	1:56.90
8	Melanie Marshall	GBR	1:56.95

==== 400 m freestyle ====
Rec.	Names	Nation	Time
WR	Laure Manaudou	FRA	3:56.79
ER	Laure Manaudou	FRA	3:56.79
CR	Laure Manaudou	FRA	3:56.79
Pos.	Names	Nation	Time
1st place, gold medalist(s)	Laure Manaudou	FRA	3:56.09 (WR)
2nd place, silver medalist(s)	Federica Pellegrini	ITA	3:59.96
3rd place, bronze medalist(s)	Joanne Jackson	GBR	4:01.48
4	Annika Lurz	GER	4:02.91
5	Alessia Filippi	ITA	4:03.82
6	Erika Villaécija García	ESP	4:03.83
7	Coralie Balmy	FRA	4:04.34
8	Anastasia Ivanenko	RUS	4:05.18

==== 800 m freestyle ====
Rec.	Names	Nation	Time
WR	Laure Manaudou	FRA	8:11.25
ER	Laure Manaudou	FRA	8:11.25
CR	Laure Manaudou	FRA	8:11.25
Pos.	Names	Nation	Time
1st place, gold medalist(s)	Laure Manaudou	FRA	8:12.24
2nd place, silver medalist(s)	Anastasia Ivanenko	RUS	8:18.09
3rd place, bronze medalist(s)	Erika Villaécija García	ESP	8:20.09
4	Rebecca Adlington	GBR	8:20.42
5	Rebecca Cooke	GBR	8:20.48
6	Sophie Huber	FRA	8:24.49
7	Federica Pellegrini	ITA	8:25.00
8	Flavia Rigamonti	SUI	8:28.10

==== 50 m backstroke ====
Rec.	Names	Nation	Time
WR	Li Hui	CHN	26.83
ER	Janine Pietsch	GER	27.00
CR	Ilona Hlaváčková	CZE	27.06
Pos.	Names	Nation	Time
1st place, gold medalist(s)	Janine Pietsch	GER	27.32
2nd place, silver medalist(s)	Iryna Amshennikova	UKR	27.44
3rd place, bronze medalist(s)	Anna Gostomelsky	ISR	27.50
4	Aleksandra Gerasimenya	BLR	27.57
5	Kateryna Zubkova	UKR	27.63
6	Sanja Jovanović	CRO	27.70
7	Nikolett Szepesi	HUN	28.10
8	Mercedes Peris	ESP	28.16

==== 100 m backstroke ====
Rec.	Names	Nation	Time
WR	Natalie Coughlin	USA	56.71
ER	Ilona Hlaváčková	CZE	57.75
CR	Ilona Hlaváčková	CZE	57.75
Pos.	Names	Nation	Time
1st place, gold medalist(s)	Laure Manaudou	FRA	57.87
2nd place, silver medalist(s)	Antje Buschschulte	GER	58.20
3rd place, bronze medalist(s)	Iryna Amshennikova	UKR	59.03
4	Janine Pietsch	GER	59.05
5	Anna Gostomelsky	ISR	59.26
6	Kateryna Zubkova	UKR	59.47
7	Elizabeth Simmonds	GBR	59.91
8	Nikolett Szepesi	HUN	1:00.04

==== 200 m backstroke ====
Rec.	Names	Nation	Time
WR	Natalie Coughlin	USA	2:03.62
ER	Antje Buschschulte	GER	2:04.23
CR	Antje Buschschulte	GER	2:04.23
Pos.	Names	Nation	Time
1st place, gold medalist(s)	Esther Baron	FRA	2:04.08 (ER)
2nd place, silver medalist(s)	Iryna Amshennikova	UKR	2:04.57
3rd place, bronze medalist(s)	Elizabeth Simmonds	GBR	2:05.74
4	Evelyn Verrasztó	HUN	2:06.69
5	Kateryna Zubkova	UKR	2:07.65
6	Nikolett Szepesi	HUN	2:07.85
7	Jenny Mensing	GER	2:08.55
8	Tatiana Olkhovikova	RUS	2:11.08

==== 50 m breaststroke ====
Rec.	Names	Nation	Time
WR	Jade Edmistone	AUS	29.90
ER	Emma Igelström	SWE	29.96
CR	Sarah Poewe	GER	30.40
Pos.	Names	Nation	Time
1st place, gold medalist(s)	Janne Schäfer	GER	30.43
2nd place, silver medalist(s)	Kate Haywood	GBR	30.88
3rd place, bronze medalist(s)	Elena Bogomazova	RUS	30.98
4	Moniek Nijhuis	NED	31.28
5	Rebecca Ejdervik	SWE	31.46
6	Anne-Sophie Le Paranthoën	FRA	31.69
7	Ina Kapishina	BLR	31.77
8	Sonja Schöber	GER	31.81

==== 100 m breaststroke ====
Rec.	Names	Nation	Time
WR	Leisel Jones	AUS	1:03.86
ER	Emma Igelström	SWE	1:05.11
CR	Elena Bogomazova	RUS	1:06.04
Pos.	Names	Nation	Time
1st place, gold medalist(s)	Anna Khlistunova	UKR	1:05.73 (CR)
2nd place, silver medalist(s)	Kirsty Balfour	GBR	1:06.57
3rd place, bronze medalist(s)	Janne Schäfer	GER	1:07.32
4	Beata Kamińska	POL	1:07.52
5	Elena Bogomazova	RUS	1:07.82
6	Kate Haywood	GBR	1:07.84
7	Ombretta Plos	ITA	1:08.10
8	Sonja Schöber	GER	1:08.13

==== 200 m breaststroke ====
Rec.	Names	Nation	Time
WR	Leisel Jones	AUS	2:17.75
ER	Emma Igelström	SWE	2:19.64
CR	Mirna Jukić	AUT	2:21.09
Pos.	Names	Nation	Time
1st place, gold medalist(s)	Kirsty Balfour	GBR	2:21.82
2nd place, silver medalist(s)	Anne Poleska	GER	2:23.12
3rd place, bronze medalist(s)	Beata Kamińska	POL	2:24.87
4	Birte Steven	GER	2:25.54
5	Ina Kapishina	BLR	2:26.41
6	Iwona Prędecka	POL	2:26.76
7	Anne Mari Gulbrandsen	NOR	2:27.03
8	Yuliya Pidlisna	UKR	2:28.30

==== 50 m butterfly ====
Rec.	Names	Nation	Time
WR	Anna-Karin Kammerling	SWE	25.33
ER	Anna-Karin Kammerling	SWE	25.33
CR	Anna-Karin Kammerling	SWE	25.60
Pos.	Names	Nation	Time
1st place, gold medalist(s)	Therese Alshammar	SWE	25.36 (CR)
2nd place, silver medalist(s)	Inge Dekker	NED	25.65
3rd place, bronze medalist(s)	Anna-Karin Kammerling	SWE	25.92
4	Antje Buschschulte	GER	26.25
5	Martina Moravcová	SVK	26.31
6	Chantal Groot	NED	26.62
7	Anna Gostomelsky	ISR	26.68
8	Jeanette Ottesen	DEN	26.75

==== 100 m butterfly ====
Rec.	Names	Nation	Time
WR	Libby Lenton	AUS	55.95
ER	Martina Moravcová	SVK	56.55
CR	Martina Moravcová	SVK	56.82
Pos.	Names	Nation	Time
1st place, gold medalist(s)	Antje Buschschulte	GER	56.94
2nd place, silver medalist(s)	Inge Dekker	NED	57.19
3rd place, bronze medalist(s)	Martina Moravcová	SVK	57.69
4	Alena Popchanka	FRA	58.65
5	Terri Dunning	GBR	59.02
6	Beatrix Boulsevicz	HUN	59.18
7	Daniela Samulski	GER	59.33
8	Rosalind Brett	GBR	1:00.06

==== 200 m butterfly ====
Rec.	Names	Nation	Time
WR	Yang Yu	CHN	2:04.04
ER	Annika Mehlhorn	GER	2:05.77
CR	Annika Mehlhorn	GER	2:05.77
Pos.	Names	Nation	Time
1st place, gold medalist(s)	Otylia Jędrzejczak	POL	2:04.94 (ER)
2nd place, silver medalist(s)	Beatrix Boulsevicz	HUN	2:06.73
3rd place, bronze medalist(s)	Jessica Dickons	GBR	2:07.36
4	Caterina Giachetti	ITA	2:07.52
5	Annika Mehlhorn	GER	2:08.19
6	Terri Dunning	GBR	2:08.28
7	Francesca Segat	ITA	2:09.29
8	Inge Dekker	NED	2:09.98

==== 100 m individual medley ====
Rec.	Names	Nation	Time
WR	Natalie Coughlin	USA	58.80
ER	Martina Moravcová	SVK	59.71
CR	Martina Moravcová	SVK	1:00.16
Pos.	Names	Nation	Time
1st place, gold medalist(s)	Hanna-Maria Seppälä	FIN	1:00.45
2nd place, silver medalist(s)	Ganna Dzerkaľ	UKR	1:00.50
3rd place, bronze medalist(s)	Svitlana Khakhlova	BLR	1:00.78
4	Alexandra Urbańczyk	POL	1:01.18
5	Hanna Eriksson	SWE	1:01.51
6	Svetlana Karpeeva	RUS	1:01.98
7	Sonja Schöber	GER	1:02.09
8	Petra Klosova	CZE	1:02.52

==== 200 m individual medley ====
Rec.	Names	Nation	Time
WR	Allison Wagner	USA	2:07.79
ER	Yana Klochkova	UKR	2:08.29
CR	Yana Klochkova	UKR	2:08.29
Pos.	Names	Nation	Time
1st place, gold medalist(s)	Katarzyna Baranowska	POL	2:09.47
2nd place, silver medalist(s)	Camille Muffat	FRA	2:10.83
3rd place, bronze medalist(s)	Aleksandra Urbańczyk	POL	2:10.89
4	Cylie Vabre	FRA	2:11.86
5	Evelyn Verrasztó	HUN	2:12.32
6	Katinka Hosszú	HUN	2:12.77
7	Daria Belyakina	RUS	2:12.99
8	Sara Thydén	SWE	2:14.75

==== 400 m individual medley ====
Rec.	Names	Nation	Time
WR	Yana Klochkova	UKR	4:27.83
ER	Yana Klochkova	UKR	4:27.83
CR	Nicole Hetzer	GER	4:29.46
Pos.	Names	Nation	Time
1st place, gold medalist(s)	Alessia Filippi	ITA	4:31.58
2nd place, silver medalist(s)	Katarzyna Baranowska	POL	4:32.78
3rd place, bronze medalist(s)	Anastasia Ivanenko	RUS	4:33.46
4	Katinka Hosszú	HUN	4:33.65
5	Cyria Vabre	FRA	4:39.60
6	Rebecca Cooke	GBR	4:40.27
7	Anja Klinar	SLO	4:40.78
8	Yana Martynova	RUS	4:41.31

==== 4 × 50 m freestyle relay ====
Rec.	Nation/Names	Time
WR	Netherlands	1:36.27
ER	Netherlands	1:36.27
CR	Netherlands	1:36.27
Pos.	Nation/Names	Time
1st place, gold medalist(s)	Sweden	1:36.61
	Magdalena Kuras; Therese Alshammar; Anna-Karin Kammerling; Josefin Lillhage	25.02; 23.72; 24.25; 23.62
2nd place, silver medalist(s)	Netherlands	1:37.27
	Inge Dekker; Saskia de Jonge; Chantal Groot; Marleen Veldhuis	24.55; 24.99; 24.76; 22.97
3rd place, bronze medalist(s)	Germany	1:38.50
	Daniela Samulski; Daniela Götz; Melke Freitag; Annika Lurz	24.72; 24.79; 24.21; 24.78
4	France	1:38.74
	Alena Popchanka; Malia Metella; Camille Muffat; Céline Couderc	24.64; 24.34; 25.14; 24.62
5	Great Britain	1:39.63
	Francesca Halsall; Melanie Marshall; Amy Smith; Rosalind Brett	24.83; 24.96; 25.32; 24.52
6	Ukraine	1:40.51
	Oxana Serikova; Natalya Khudyakova; Ganna Dzerkaľ; Iryna Amshennikova	25.07; 25.56; 25.27; 24.61
7	Italy	1:41.12
	Federica Pellegrini; Francesca Segat; Alessia Filippi; Cristina Chiuso	26.00; 25.56; 25.30; 24.26
8	Denmark	1:41.62
	Annette Hansen; Jeanette Ottesen; Maja Kruse; Line Præst Lauridsen	25.93; 24.82; 25.24; 25.63

==== 4 × 50 m medley relay ====
Rec.	Nation/Names	Time
WR	Netherlands	1:47.44
ER	Netherlands	1:47.44
CR	Netherlands	1:47.44
Pos.	Nation/Names	Time
1st place, gold medalist(s)	Germany	1:47.55
	Janine Pietsch; Janne Schäfer; Antje Buschschulte; Daniela Samulski	27.37; 29.81; 25.60; 24.77
2nd place, silver medalist(s)	Sweden	1:48.14
	Therese Alshammar; Rebecca Ejdervik; Anna-Karin Kammerling; Josefin Lillhage	28.12; 30.93; 25.10; 23.99
3rd place, bronze medalist(s)	Great Britain	1:48.26
	Elizabeth Simmonds; Kate Haywood; Rosalind Brett; Francesca Halsall	28.12; 30.21; 26.05; 23.88
4	France	1:49.15
	Laure Manaudou; Anne-Sophie Le Paranthoën; Alena Popchanka; Malia Metella	27.17; 31.39; 26.43; 24.16
5	Ukraine	1:49.36
	Kateryna Zubkova; Anna Khlistunova; Natalya Khudyakova; Oxana Serikova	27.92; 30.45; 26.56; 24.43
6	Belarus	1:50.67
	Alexandra Bas; Ina Kapishina; Aleksandra Gerasimenya; Sviatlana Khakhlova	28.31; 31.00; 26.67; 24.69
7	Finland	1:50.99
	Anu Koivisto; Katja Lehtonen; Jane Kaljonen; Hanna-Maria Seppälä	28.90; 30.94; 27.54; 23.61
8	Russia	1:51.43
	Tatiana Olkhovikova; Elena Bogomazova; Irina Bespalova; Kira Volodina	28.65; 30.83; 26.76; 25.19
