= Maria Gromova =

Maria Gromova may refer to:

- Mariya Gromova (born 1984), Russian synchronized swimmer
- Maria Gromova (swimmer) (born 1988), Russian backstroke and relay swimmer
- Maria Gromova, one of a number of purported Soviet cosmonauts named in the Lost Cosmonauts conspiracy theory
- Maria Gromova (politician), a high-standing Soviet official
