= Matti Rajakylä =

Finnish swimmer

Personal information
- Full name: Matti Rajakylä
- Nationality: Finland
- Born: August 14, 1984 (age 42) Kirkkonummi, Finland
- Height: 1.88 m (6 ft 2 in)
- Weight: 87 kg (192 lb)

Sport
- Sport: Swimming
- Strokes: Butterfly, Freestyle
- Club: Helsingfors Simsällskap
Medal record
Men's swimming
European Championships (SC)
Silver medal – second place	2006 Helsinki	4×50 m medley
Bronze medal – third place	2004 Vienna	4×50 m medley
Bronze medal – third place	2005 Trieste	50 m butterfly

Matti Rajakylä (born August 14, 1984, in Kirkkonummi, Finland) is a former freestyle and butterfly swimmer from Finland. He has held several Finnish national records in both long course and short course. He participated in the Summer Olympics in Athens 2004 and Beijing 2008.

Rajakylä's achievements include the bronze in the 50 m freestyle at the European Junior Championships in Linz, Austria in 2002, the bronze in the 4×50 m medley relay at the European Short Course Swimming Championships in Wien, Austria in 2004 and the bronze in the 50 m butterfly at the European SC Championships in Trieste, Italy in 2005 with a time of 23.17. Rajakylä finished third in the semi-finals of 50m butterfly at the European LC Championships 2006 in Budapest, Hungary, but was left on sixth position in the finals.

In December, at the European Short Course Swimming Championships 2006 in Helsinki, Finland, Rajakylä managed to achieve silver medal status in the men's 4 x 50m medley relay. He came in last in each of his personal finals.

In April 2009 Rajakylä announced that he quits his swimming career.

== Records ==
Rajakylä has hold Finnish national records in following events:

Distance	Event	Time	Location	Date
50 m (lc)	Freestyle	22.48	Beijing, China	August 14, 2008
50 m (sc)	Freestyle	21.70	Trieste, Italy	December 8, 2005
100 m (sc)	Freestyle	48.05	Seinäjoki	July 4, 2008
50 m (sc)	Butterfly	23.17	Trieste, Italy	December 11, 2005
4 x 50 m (sc)	Freestyle Relay	1:26.68	Dublin, Ireland	December 14, 2003
10 x 50 m (sc)	Freestyle Relay	4:02.02	Helsinki	March 21, 2004
4 × 200 m (sc)	Freestyle Relay	7:26.59	Jyväskylä	July 5, 2007
4 x 50 m (sc)	Medley Relay	1:34.95	Helsinki	December 7, 2006

Rajakylä has also set the world record for the 24-hour swim along with other Finnish swimmers in September 2005.

== Personal life ==
After his retirement from the sport, Rajakylä met Indian Hindu spiritual leader Amma in Finland in 2009, which led him to live in an ashram in Kerala, India, from six to nine months per year from 2011 to 2017. Rajakylä works as a swimming coach, and he lives in Santa Cruz, California, with his American wife whom he had met in the ashram.
