= Swimming at the 2016 European Aquatics Championships – Mixed 4 × 100 metre medley relay =

Mixed 4 × 100 metre medley relay at the 2016 European Aquatics Championships
- Dates: 17 May
- Competitors: 47 from 10 nations
- Teams: 10
- Winning time: 3:44.56

Medalists
gold medal	Chris Walker-Hebborn; Adam Peaty; Siobhan-Marie O'Connor; Francesca Halsall	Great Britain
silver medal	Simone Sabbioni; Martina Carraro; Piero Codia; Federica Pellegrini	Italy
bronze medal	Gábor Balog; Gábor Financsek; Evelyn Verrasztó; Zsuzsanna Jakabos	Hungary

The Mixed 4 × 100 metre medley relay competition of the 2016 European Aquatics Championships was held on 17 May 2016.

== Records ==
Prior to the competition, the existing world, European and championship records were as follows.

	Nation	Time	Location	Date
World record	Great Britain	3:41.71	Kazan	5 August 2015
European record	Great Britain	3:41.71	Kazan	5 August 2015
Championship record	Great Britain	3:44.02	Berlin	19 August 2014

== Results ==
=== Heats ===
The heats were held at 11:17.

Rank	Heat	Lane	Nation	Swimmers	Time	Notes
1	2	7	Great Britain	Georgia Davies (1:00.35); Craig Benson (1:00.49); Siobhan-Marie O'Connor (58.21); Duncan Scott (48.87)	3:47.92	Q
2	2	3	Italy	Christopher Ciccarese (55.69); Fabio Scozzoli (1:01.09); Ilaria Bianchi (58.12); Federica Pellegrini (53.62)	3:48.52	Q
3	2	2	Sweden	Mattias Carlsson (55.63); Erik Persson (1:01.15); Stina Gardell (59.81); Ida Lindborg (55.13)	3:51.72	Q
4	1	6	Hungary	Dávid Földházi (55.65); Gábor Financsek (1:01.78); Evelyn Verrasztó (1:01.22); Zsuzsanna Jakabos (55.13)	3:53.78	Q
5	2	4	Finland	Mimosa Jallow (1:01.08); Sami Aaltomaa (1:02.18); Tanja Kylliaeinen (1:01.23); Ari-Pekka Liukkonen (49.45)	3:53.94	
6	1	4	Turkey	Ege Başer (55.81); Demir Atasoy (1:01.74); Gizem Bozkurt (1:01.06); Ilknur Nihan Cakici (56.14)	3:54.75	Q
7	1	3	Norway	Markus Lie (58.03); Ariel Braathen (1:09.88); Sindri Thor Jakobsson (54.36); Susann Bjoernsen (54.76)	3:57.03	Q
8	1	5	Moldova	Tatiana Salcutan (1:04.79); Alina Bulmag (1:15.05); Pavel Izbisciuc (59.58); Alexei Sancov (53.82)	4:13.24	Q
	2	5	Estonia	Alina Kendzior (1:03.33); Filipp Provorkov (1:02.71); Daniel Zaitsev (53.76); Kertu Ly Alnek	DSQ	
	1	7	France	Benjamin Stasiulis; Théo Bussiere; Marie Wattel; Cloé Hache	DSQ	
	1	2	Poland	DNS		
	2	6	Switzerland	DNS		

=== Final ===
The final was held at 19:40.

Rank	Lane	Nation	Swimmers	Time	Notes
1st place, gold medalist(s)	4	Great Britain	Chris Walker-Hebborn (54.36); Adam Peaty (58.84); Siobhan-Marie O'Connor (57.69); Francesca Halsall (53.67)	3:44.56	
2nd place, silver medalist(s)	5	Italy	Simone Sabbioni (54.01); Martina Carraro (1:07.48); Piero Codia (51.05); Federica Pellegrini (53.20)	3:45.74	
3rd place, bronze medalist(s)	6	Hungary	Gábor Balog (54.51); Gábor Financsek (1:01.19); Evelyn Verrasztó (59.37); Zsuzsanna Jakabos (54.43)	3:49.50	
4	3	Sweden	Mattias Carlsson (55.12); Erik Persson (1:00.70); Stina Gardell (59.75); Ida Lindborg (54.40)	3:49.97	
5	2	Turkey	Ege Başer (56.38); Demir Atasoy (1:01.74); Gizem Bozkurt (1:01.05); Ilknur Nihan Cakici (56.92)	3:56.09	
6	1	Moldova	Tatiana Salcutan (1:04.91); Alina Bulmag (1:11.42); Pavel Izbisciuc (58.61); Alexei Sancov (51.75)	4:06.69	
	7	Norway	Markus Lie (57.13); Ariel Braathen; Sindri Thor Jakobsson; Susann Bjoernsen	DSQ	
