= Gábor Balog =

Hungarian swimmer (born 1990)

Personal information
- Born: 2 September 1990 (age 35) Békéscsaba, Hungary
Medal record
Representing Hungary
Men's swimming
European Championships (LC)
Bronze medal – third place	2014 Berlin	200 m backstroke
Bronze medal – third place	2016 London	4×100 m medley
Bronze medal – third place	2016 London	4×100 m mixed medley
European Junior Championship (LC)
Silver medal – second place	2008 Belgrade	200 m backstroke
Bronze medal – third place	2007 Antwerp	200 m backstroke
Bronze medal – third place	2007 Antwerp	4×100 m medley
Men's lifesaving
World Games
Gold medal – first place	2022 Birmingham	4x50 m obstacle
Gold medal – first place	2022 Birmingham	4x50 m medley

Gábor Balog (born 2 September 1990 in Békéscsaba) is a Hungarian swimmer, who competed at the 2008, 2012 and 2016 Summer Olympics.

At the 2008 Summer Olympics, he competed in the men's 200 metre backstroke only. At the 2012 Summer Olympics, he competed in the Men's 200 metre backstroke, finishing in 5th place overall in the heats, and 5th place in his semifinal, failing to make the final. He also competed as part of the Hungarian men's 4 × 100 m freestyle relay team. At the 2016 Summer Olympics, he competed in different events, the 100 m backstroke and the 4 × 100 m medley relay.
