= Kateryna Zubkova =

Ukrainian swimmer

Personal information
- Full name: Катерина Михайлівна Зубкова
- Nationality: Ukrainian
- Born: 14 July 1988 (age 37) Kharkiv, Kharkiv Oblast, Ukrainian SSR, Soviet Union
- Height: 5 ft 7 in (170 cm)
- Weight: 121 lb (55 kg)

Sport
- Sport: Swimming
- Strokes: Butterfly
Medal record
World Championships (SC)
Silver medal – second place	2008 Manchester	100 m backstroke
Bronze medal – third place	2008 Manchester	50 m backstroke
European Championships (SC)
Gold medal – first place	2004 Vienna	100 m backstroke
Silver medal – second place	2004 Vienna	50 m backstroke
Silver medal – second place	2008 Rijeka	50 m backstroke
Silver medal – second place	2008 Rijeka	100 m backstroke
European Junior Championships
Silver medal – second place	2003 Glasgow	50 m backstroke

Kateryna Mikhailivna Zubkova (Ukrainian: Катери́на Миха́йлівна Зубко́ва) (born 14 July 1988 in Kharkiv) is a Ukrainian swimmer.

== Career ==
She has won national titles for Ukraine eight times, and is a former European breaststroke champion. She has competed at numerous international meets, including the 2004 Summer Olympics, the 2004 and 2006 European Short Course Swimming Championships, and the 2007 World Aquatics Championships.

During the 2007 World Aquatics Championships in Melbourne, she briefly made national headlines after the event's broadcaster filmed a violent altercation between her and Mikhail Zubkov, her father and coach. As a result of the incident, FINA withdrew Mikhail's coaching accreditation, and Victoria Police obtained an intervention order barring him from going within 200 metres of his daughter, although the order was later struck out in the Melbourne Magistrates' Court.

She later joined the Indiana University swim team to continue her training and education.
