= Swimming at the 2016 European Aquatics Championships – Men's 4 × 100 metre medley relay =

Men's 4 × 100 metre medley relay at the 2016 European Aquatics Championships
- Dates: 22 May
- Competitors: 63 from 14 nations
- Teams: 14
- Winning time: 3:32.15

Medalists
gold medal	Chris Walker-Hebborn; Adam Peaty; James Guy; Duncan Scott	Great Britain
silver medal	Benjamin Stasiulis; Giacomo Perez-Dortona; Mehdy Metella; Florent Manaudou	France
bronze medal	Gábor Balog; Gábor Financsek; László Cseh; Richárd Bohus	Hungary

The Men's 4 × 100 metre medley relay competition of the 2016 European Aquatics Championships was held on 22 May 2016.

== Records ==
Prior to the competition, the existing world, European and championship records were as follows.

	Nation	Time	Location	Date
World record	United States	3:27.28	Rome	2 August 2009
European record	Germany	3:28.58	Rome	2 August 2009
Championship record	France	3:31.32	Budapest	15 August 2010

== Results ==
=== Heats ===
The heats were held at 10:12.

Rank	Heat	Lane	Nation	Swimmers	Time	Notes
1	2	1	Italy	Simone Sabbioni (53.94); Fabio Scozzoli (1:01.56); Matteo Rivolta (52.00); Luca Leonardi (48.66)	3:36.16	Q
2	2	2	Lithuania	Danas Rapšys (54.81); Giedrius Titenis (1:00.07); Deividas Margevičius (53.02); Simonas Bilis (48.56)	3:36.46	Q
3	2	3	Hungary	Gábor Balog (55.05); Gábor Financsek (1:01.26); László Cseh (51.01); Richárd Bohus (49.49)	3:36.81	Q
4	1	2	France	Benjamin Stasiulis (55.48); Giacomo Perez-Dortona (1:00.54); Mehdy Metella (51.55); Yannick Agnel (49.30)	3:36.87	Q
5	1	6	Great Britain	Chris Walker-Hebborn (54.78); Ross Murdoch (59.53); Duncan Scott (53.26); Robert Renwick (49.54)	3:37.11	Q
6	1	4	Greece	Apostolos Christou (54.45); Panagiotis Samilidis (1:00.92); Andreas Vazaios (52.57); Christos Katrantzis (49.56)	3:37.50	Q
7	2	5	Ireland	Shane Ryan (54.63); Nicholas Quinn (1:01.33); Brendan Hyland (53.45); Curtis Coulter (48.99)	3:38.40	Q
8	2	7	Sweden	Mattias Carlsson (55.92); Johannes Skagius (1:00.70); Jesper Björk (53.32); Isak Eliasson (48.47)	3:38.41	Q
9	2	4	Russia	Nikita Ulyanov (55.41); Mikhail Dorinov (1:01.71); Nikolay Skvortsov (52.78); Andrey Grechin (48.58)	3:38.48	
10	1	1	Belgium	Nils Van Audekerke (56.96); Jonas Coreelman (1:02.05); Louis Croenen (52.93); Pieter Timmers (48.52)	3:40.46	
11	2	6	Turkey	Doruk Tekin (56.14); Demir Atasoy (1:01.58); Kaan Türker Ayar (53.11); Emre Sakçı (50.30)	3:41.13	
12	1	3	Estonia	Karl Luht (56.61); Martin Allikvee (1:01.47); Kregor Zirk (53.69); Pjotr Degtjarjov (49.99)	3:41.76	
	1	5	Switzerland	Nils Liess (55.89); Patrik Schwarzenbach (1:03.17); Nico van Duijn; Alexandre Haldemann	DSQ	
	1	7	Croatia	Anton Loncar (56.36); Kristijan Tomić (1:01.79); Mario Todorović (53.57); Mislav Sever	DSQ	

=== Final ===
The final was held on 22 May at 17:23.

Rank	Lane	Nation	Swimmers	Time	Notes
1st place, gold medalist(s)	2	Great Britain	Chris Walker-Hebborn (54.23); Adam Peaty (58.08); James Guy (51.69); Duncan Scott (48.15)	3:32.15	
2nd place, silver medalist(s)	6	France	Benjamin Stasiulis (54.73); Giacomo Perez-Dortona (1:00.23); Mehdy Metella (51.38); Florent Manaudou (47.55)	3:33.89	
3rd place, bronze medalist(s)	3	Hungary	Gábor Balog (54.40); Gábor Financsek (1:01.45); László Cseh (50.33); Richárd Bohus (47.94)	3:34.12	
4	7	Greece	Apostolos Christou (54.30); Panagiotis Samilidis (1:00.06); Andreas Vazaios (52.45); Kristian Golomeev (47.60)	3:34.41	
5	5	Lithuania	Danas Rapšys (54.07); Giedrius Titenis (1:00.23); Deividas Margevičius (52.83); Simonas Bilis (48.18)	3:35.31	
6	8	Sweden	Mattias Carlsson (55.54); Johannes Skagius (59.98); Jesper Björk (53.34); Isak Eliasson (48.53)	3:37.39	
7	1	Ireland	Shane Ryan (54.37); Nicholas Quinn (1:01.01); Brendan Hyland (53.35); Curtis Coulter (48.74)	3:37.47	
	4	Italy	Simone Sabbioni (54.33); Andrea Toniato (1:00.60); Piero Codia (52.17); Luca Dotto	DSQ	
