= Sergiy Bilov =

Ukrainian swimmer

Personal information
- Nationality: Ukrainian
- Born: 1987 (age 38–39)

Sport
- Sport: Swimming
Medal record
Men's swimming
Representing Ukraine
European Youth Olympic Festival
Silver medal – second place	2003 Paris	50 m freestyle
Bronze medal – third place	2003 Paris	100 m freestyle
Bronze medal – third place	2003 Paris	4 x 100 m freestyle relay
European Junior Championships
Silver medal – second place	2005 Budapest	50 m freestyle

Sergiy Bilov (Ukrainian: Сергій Олександрович Білов; born 1987) is a retired Ukrainian competitive swimmer who represented Ukraine at the 2003 European Youth Olympic Festival, held in Paris. He is multiple medalist of 2003 European Youth Olympic Festival and a silver medalist of 2005 European Junior Swimming Championships in 50 m freestyle event.
