= Gábor Financsek =

Hungarian swimmer

Personal information
- Born: 27 August 1985 (age 40)

Sport
- Sport: Swimming
Medal record
Men's swimming
Representing Hungary
European Championships (LC)
Bronze medal – third place	2016 London	4×100 m medley
Bronze medal – third place	2016 London	4×100 m mixed medley
European Junior Championship (LC)
Gold medal – first place	2003 Glasgow	4×100 m medley
Silver medal – second place	2003 Glasgow	50 m breaststroke

Gábor Financsek (born 27 August 1985) is a Hungarian swimmer. He competed in the men's 50 metre breaststroke event at the 2017 World Aquatics Championships.
