= Ľuboš Križko =

Slovak swimmer

Medal record

Men's swimming

Representing Slovakia

European Championships (LC)
Bronze medal – third place	2008 Eindhoven	50 m backstroke

European Championships (SC)
Bronze medal – third place	2006 Helsinki	50 m backstroke
Bronze medal – third place	2008 Rijeka	50 m backstroke

Ľuboš Križko (born August 9, 1979) is an Olympic swimmer from Trenčín, Slovakia who competes in men's 100 meter backstroke. He finished 13th at the 2008 Summer Olympics in Beijing and tied for 27th at the 2004 Summer Olympics in Athens.

At the 2010 European Aquatics Championships, Križko tested positive for tamoxifen and has been banned for two years (retroactive September 22, 2010).
