= 2005 European Junior Swimming Championships =

Water sport competitions

The 2005 European Junior Swimming Championships were held in Budapest, Hungary 14–17 July.

== Medal table ==
* Host nation (Hungary)

Rank	Nation	Gold	Silver	Bronze	Total
1	Hungary (HUN)*	8	12	5	25
2	Italy (ITA)	6	5	4	15
3	Germany (GER)	6	2	5	13
4	Russia (RUS)	5	1	4	10
5	Poland (POL)	4	4	3	11
6	France (FRA)	3	3	1	7
7	Spain (ESP)	3	0	0	3
8	Portugal (POR)	2	2	4	8
9	Great Britain (GBR)	1	4	5	10
10	Ukraine (UKR)	1	2	1	4
11	Romania (ROM)	0	1	1	2
12	Belgium (BEL)	0	1	0	1
13	Sweden (SWE)	0	0	3	3
14	Austria (AUT)	0	0	1	1
14	Netherlands (NED)	0	0	1	1
14	Slovakia (SVK)	0	0	1	1
Totals (16 entries)		39	37	39	115

== Medal summary ==
=== Boy's events ===
Event	Gold		Silver		Bronze	
50 m freestyle	Steffen Deibler; Germany	22.26	Sergiy Bilov; Ukraine	23.02	Tiago Venâncio; Portugal	23.11
100 m freestyle	Steffen Deibler; Germany	49.26	Kevin Trannoy; France	50.43	Tiago Venâncio; Portugal	50.56
200 m freestyle	Vitaly Romanovich; Russia	1:49.86	Tiago Venâncio; Portugal	1:49.98	Steffen Deibler; Germany	1:50.10
400 m freestyle	Mateusz Sawrymowicz; Poland	3:49.72	Robbie Renwick; Great Britain	3:55.18	Vitaly Romanovich; Russia	3:55.58
1500 m freestyle	Mateusz Sawrymowicz; Poland	15:06.04	Gergő Kis; Hungary	15:25.91	Chris Alderton; Great Britain	15:27.15
50 m backstroke	Simone Manni; Italy	26.44	János Szabó; Hungary	26.55	Marco Malinverno; Italy	26.57
100 m backstroke	Marco Malinverno; Italy	57.24	János Szabó; Hungary	57.39	Simone Manni; Italy	57.59
200 m backstroke	Jakub Jasinski; Poland	2:02.76	Pedro Oliveira; Portugal	2:03.06	Simone Manni; Italy	2:03.10
50 m breaststroke	Fernando Mazzotta; Italy	28.46	Dmytro Cherkasov; Ukraine	28.81	Mariusz Winogrodzki; Poland	28.90
100 m breaststroke	Fernando Mazzotta; Italy	1:02.46	Ákos Molnár; Hungary	1:02.85	Olexiy Fedyna; Ukraine	1:02.89
200 m breaststroke	Ákos Rácz; Hungary	2:14.24	Ákos Molnár; Hungary	2:15.02	Slawomir Wolniak; Poland	2:16.40
50 m butterfly	Rafael Muñoz; Spain	24.46	Steffen Deibler; Germany	24.53	Hannes Heyl; Germany	24.68
100 m butterfly	Joseph Davide Natullo; Italy	54.77	Dénes Zubcsek; Hungary	54.84	Clement Lefert; France	55.11
200 m butterfly	Gergő Kis; Hungary	1:59.61	Joseph Davide Natullo; Italy	2:00.71	Dénes Zubcsek; Hungary	2:00.77
200 m individual medley	Dávid Verrasztó; Hungary	2:03.59	Jakub Jasinski; Poland	2:03.77	Carlos Almeida; Portugal	2:04.32
400 m individual medley	Dávid Verrasztó; Hungary	4:17.72	Gergő Kis; Hungary	4:17.79	Thomas Haffield; Great Britain	4:21.75
4 × 100 m freestyle relay	Germany; Alibek Kaesler; Victor Busch; Christian Kubusch; Steffen Deibler	3:24.48	Poland; Jakub Jasinski; Krzystof Gawlowicz; Mateusz Haas; Katejan Zaluski	3:24.68	Russia; Alexsey Lapin; Andrei Seryy; Andrei Grechin; Pavel Kotelnikov	3:24.77
4 × 200 m freestyle relay	Russia; Pavel Kotelnikov; Sergey Perunin; Alexsey Lapin; Vitaly Romanovich	7:25.03	Italy; Federico Colbertaldo; Nicola Bolzonello; Simone Redini; Andrea Busato	7:31.10	Germany; Alibek Kaesler; Daniel Schwarz; Bjorn Barnofski; Steffen Deibler	7:33.45
4 × 100 m medley relay	Germany; Alibek Kaesler; Mario Schild; Fabian Schilha; Steffen Deibler	3:44.92	Poland; Andrzej Dubiel; Mariusz Winogrodzki; Bartosz Wisniewski; Katejan Zaluski	3:45.47	Hungary; János Szabó; Ákos Molnár; Dénes Zubcsek; Balázs Makany	3:47.07

=== Girl's events ===
Event	Gold		Silver		Bronze	
50 m freestyle	Gaia Mancabelli; Italy	25.70	Francesca Halsall; Great Britain	25.96	Ranomi Kromowidjojo; Netherlands	26.22
100 m freestyle	Francesca Halsall; Great Britain	55.69	Camille Muffat; France	55.72	Ionela Cozma; Romania	56.74
200 m freestyle	Katinka Hosszú; Hungary	2:02.30	Victoria Malyutina; Russia	2:02.96	Sophie-Luise Dietrich; Germany	2:03.08
400 m freestyle	Anastasia Ivanenko; Russia	4:14.18	Katinka Hosszú; Hungary	4:14.74	Sophie-Luise Dietrich; Germany	4:16.50
800 m freestyle	Anastasia Ivanenko; Russia	8:41.05	Ionela Cozma; Romania	8:42.50	Katinka Hosszú; Hungary	8:43.07
50 m backstroke	Jenny Lahl; Germany	29.81	Jorina Aerents; Belgium	29.97	Dóra Maxim; Hungary	30.17
100 m backstroke	Escarlata Bernard Gonzalez; Spain	1:03.88	Helga Kalicz; Hungary	1:04.31	Therese Svendsen; Sweden	1:04.59
200 m backstroke	Escarlata Bernard Gonzalez; Spain	2:14.63	Evelyn Verrasztó; Hungary	2:14.82	Therese Svendsen; Sweden	2:16.12
50 m breaststroke	Luiza Hryniewicz; Poland	32.96	Elisa Celli; Italy	32.99	Diana Gomes; Portugal	33.02
100 m breaststroke	Diana Gomes; Portugal	1:10.09	Elisa Celli; Italy	1:11.52	Adrianna Sawicka; Poland	1:11.94
200 m breaststroke	Diana Gomes; Portugal	2:29.51	Iwona Predecka; Poland	2:31.77	Alessandra Tricerri; Italy	2:32.71
50 m butterfly	Lyubov Korol; Ukraine	27.40	Lise Soule; France	27.66	Denisa Smolenova; Slovakia	27.75
100 m butterfly	Lise Soule; France	1:00.94	Jemma Lowe; Great Britain	1:01.73	Zsuzsanna Jakabos; Hungary	1:01.97
200 m butterfly	Zsuzsanna Jakabos; Hungary	2:10.18	Antje Mahn; Germany	2:12.19	Jessica Dickons; Great Britain	2:12.28
200 m individual medley	Camille Muffat; France	2:14.84	Zsuzsanna Jakabos; Hungary	2:16.62	Nina Dittrich; Austria	2:17.14
400 m individual medley	Katinka Hosszú; Hungary	4:45.88	Hannah Miley; Great Britain	4:47.47	Ekaterina Ryvanina; Russia	4:48.37
4 × 100 m freestyle relay	Hungary; Zsuzsanna Jakabos; Luca Cseh Németh; Evelyn Verrasztó; Katinka Hosszú	3:49.37	Russia; Maria Ugolkova; Olga Klyuchnikova; Victoria Malyutina; Anna Smirnova	3:49.37	Sweden; Stina Gardell; Therese Svendsen; Sandra Jacobsen; Sara Thyden	3:50.88
4 × 200 m freestyle relay	Germany; Antje Mahn; Nadine Stresing; Franziska Prade; Sophie-Luise Dietrich	8:14.60	Hungary; Evelyn Verrasztó; Petra Pleszinger; Katinka Hosszú; Zsuzsanna Jakabos	8:15.22	Great Britain; Francesca Halsall; Jazmin Carlin; Natalie Durant; Rachel George	8:15.46
4 × 100 m medley relay	France; Reine-Victoria Weber; Betty Laglbauer; Lise Soule; Camille Muffat	4:14.36	Italy; Elisa Apostoli; Elisa Celli; Ilaria Bianchi; Livia Travaglini	4:15.10	Russia; Yulia Guzairova; Alena Rumyantseva; Maria Ugolkova; Anna Smirnova	4:15.77
