= Iryna Maystruk =

Ukrainian swimmer

Personal information
- Full name: Iryna Maystruk
- National team: Ukraine
- Born: 23 October 1987 (age 38) Kirovohrad, Ukrainian SSR, Soviet Union
- Height: 1.70 m (5 ft 7 in)
- Weight: 62 kg (137 lb)

Sport
- Sport: Swimming
- Strokes: Breaststroke
- Club: Ukraïna Dnipropetrovsk
Medal record
European Junior Championships
Gold medal – first place	2003 Glasgow	200 m breaststroke

Iryna Maystruk (Ukrainian: Ірина Майструк; born October 23, 1987) is a Ukrainian former swimmer, who specialized in breaststroke events. Maystruk qualified for the women's 200 m breaststroke at the 2004 Summer Olympics in Athens, by eclipsing a FINA B-cut of 2:32.85 from the European Junior Championships in Lisbon, Portugal. She challenged seven other swimmers in heat three, including top medal favorite Anne Poleska of Germany. She raced to sixth place by nearly 11 seconds behind winner Poleska in 2:37.42. Maystruk failed to advance into the semifinals, as she placed twenty-ninth overall in the preliminaries.
