= Swimming at the 2014 European Aquatics Championships – Men's 200 metre backstroke =

Men's 200 metre backstroke at the Swimming at the 2014 European Aquatics Championships
- Dates: 22–23 August
- Competitors: 33 from 19 nations
- Winning time: 1:56.02

Medalists
gold medal	Radosław Kawęcki	Poland
silver medal	Christian Diener	Germany
bronze medal	Gábor Balog	Hungary

The Men's 200 metre backstroke competition of the 2014 European Aquatics Championships was held on 22–23 August.

== Records ==
Prior to the competition, the existing world, European and championship records were as follows.

	Name	Nation	Time	Location	Date
World record	Aaron Peirsol	United States	1:51.92	Rome	31 July 2009
European record	Radosław Kawęcki	Poland	1:54.24	Barcelona	2 August 2013
Championship record	Radosław Kawęcki	Poland	1:55.28	Debrecen	26 May 2012

== Results ==
=== Heats ===
The heats were held at 09:30.

Rank	Heat	Lane	Name	Nationality	Time	Notes
1	3	4	Péter Bernek	Hungary	1:58.45	Q
2	3	3	Christian Diener	Germany	1:58.74	Q
3	3	5	Jan-Philip Glania	Germany	1:58.91	Q
4	2	3	Luca Mencarini	Italy	1:59.47	Q
5	4	6	Yakov Toumarkin	Israel	1:59.94	Q
6	4	4	Radosław Kawęcki	Poland	1:59.94	Q
7	3	2	Mattias Carlsson	Sweden	2:00.00	Q
8	4	2	Benjamin Stasiulis	France	2:00.06	Q
9	2	5	Gábor Balog	Hungary	2:00.14	Q
10	2	6	Eric Ress	France	2:00.36	Q
11	1	6	Ivan Trofimov	Russia	2:00.38	Q
12	4	3	Danas Rapšys	Lithuania	2:00.95	Q
13	4	5	Christopher Ciccarese	Italy	2:00.96	Q
14	2	1	Dávid Verrasztó	Hungary	2:00.97	
15	3	7	Roman Dmytriyev	Czech Republic	2:01.13	Q
16	4	1	Axel Pettersson	Sweden	2:01.20	Q
17	2	4	Andrey Shabasov	Russia	2:01.48	Q
18	4	7	Pedro Oliveira	Portugal	2:02.02	
19	2	7	Sergiy Varvaruk	Ukraine	2:02.12	
20	2	0	Dmitry Gorbunov	Russia	2:02.98	
21	3	9	David Gamburg	Israel	2:03.50	
22	4	0	Teo Kolonić	Croatia	2:03.54	
23	4	8	Nils van Audekerke	Belgium	2:03.70	
24	3	1	Lander Hendrickx	Belgium	2:03.87	
25	4	9	Boris Kirillov	Azerbaijan	2:03.90	
26	2	9	David Kunčar	Czech Republic	2:03.96	
27	1	3	Martin Zhelev	Bulgaria	2:03.97	
28	3	8	Elijah Stolz	Switzerland	2:04.04	
29	3	0	Jean-François Schneiders	Luxembourg	2:04.32	
30	2	8	Marko Krce-Rabar	Croatia	2:04.42	
31	1	4	Gytis Stankevičius	Lithuania	2:04.62	
32	2	2	Nikita Ulyanov	Russia	2:06.19	
33	1	2	Doruk Tekin	Turkey	2:07.14	
—	1	5	Max Litchfield	Great Britain		DNS
—	3	6	Federico Turrini	Italy		DNS

=== Semifinals ===
The semifinals were held at 19:05.

==== Semifinal 1 ====
Rank	Lane	Name	Nationality	Time	Notes
1	5	Luca Mencarini	Italy	1:58.16	Q
2	7	Danas Rapšys	Lithuania	1:58.21	Q
3	4	Christian Diener	Germany	1:58.37	Q
4	6	Benjamin Stasiulis	France	1:58.46	Q
5	3	Yakov Toumarkin	Israel	1:58.83	
6	2	Eric Ress	France	1:59.14	
7	8	Andrey Shabasov	Russia	2:00.05	
8	1	Roman Dmytriyev	Czech Republic	2:01.45	

==== Semifinal 2 ====
Rank	Lane	Name	Nationality	Time	Notes
1	3	Radosław Kawęcki	Poland	1:57.35	Q
2	4	Péter Bernek	Hungary	1:57.41	Q
3	2	Gábor Balog	Hungary	1:57.97	Q
4	5	Jan-Philip Glania	Germany	1:58.21	Q
5	6	Mattias Carlsson	Sweden	2:00.19	
6	1	Christopher Ciccarese	Italy	2:00.20	
7	7	Ivan Trofimov	Russia	2:01.93	
8	8	Axel Pettersson	Sweden	2:01.98	

=== Final ===
The final was held at 17:06.

Rank	Lane	Name	Nationality	Time	Notes
1st place, gold medalist(s)	4	Radosław Kawęcki	Poland	1:56.02	
2nd place, silver medalist(s)	1	Christian Diener	Germany	1:57.16	
3rd place, bronze medalist(s)	3	Gábor Balog	Hungary	1:57.42	
4	5	Péter Bernek	Hungary	1:57.47	
5	2	Danas Rapšys	Lithuania	1:57.68	
6	8	Benjamin Stasiulis	France	1:58.30	
7	7	Jan-Philip Glania	Germany	1:58.84	
8	6	Luca Mencarini	Italy	1:58.92	
