= Timothy Shuttleworth =

British swimmer

Personal information
- Nationality: British
- Born: 24 April 1997 (age 29)

Sport
- Sport: Swimming
Medal record
World Championships
Bronze medal – third place	2017 Budapest	5 km open water

Timothy Shuttleworth (born 24 April 1997) is a British swimmer. He competed in the men's 1500 metre freestyle event at the 2016 Summer Olympics.
