= Alessandro Terrin =

Italian swimmer (born 1985)

Personal information
- Full name: Alessandro Terrin
- Nationality: Italy
- Born: 11 July 1985 (age 40) Dolo, Italy
- Height: 193 cm (6 ft 4 in)
- Weight: 93 kg (205 lb; 14.6 st)

Sport
- Sport: Swimming
- Strokes: Breaststroke
- Club: Aurelia Nuoto
Medal record
World Championships (SC)
Silver medal – second place	2006 Shanghai	50 m breaststroke
European Championships (LC)
Gold medal – first place	2006 Budapest	50 m breaststroke
Bronze medal – third place	2008 Eindhoven	50 m breaststroke
European Championships (SC)
Gold medal – first place	2008 Rijeka	4×50 m medley
Silver medal – second place	2005 Trieste	50 m breaststroke
Silver medal – second place	2006 Helsinki	50 m breaststroke
Silver medal – second place	2009 Istanbul	50 m breaststroke
Bronze medal – third place	2006 Helsinki	4×50 m medley
Bronze medal – third place	2007 Debrecen	50 m breaststroke

Alessandro Terrin (born 11 July 1985) is a male Italian swimmer. He represented Italy at the 2008 Olympic Games in the 100m breaststroke and the 4×100m; medley relay swimming events.

His favourite event is the 50m breaststroke: he won several medals in this event and became European champion at the 2006 European LC Championships in Budapest together with Oleg Lisogor; he also won a silver medal at the 2006 SC World Championships in Shanghai.

At the 2008 European SC Championships in Rijeka he won a gold medal in the 4×50 m medley relay event, where the Italian team set the current European record and world's best performance.

== Personal bests ==
He currently holds 1 world's best performance (WB), 1 European record (ER) and 1 Italian records (IR). His personal bests (as of the 27 May 2009) are:

Event	Long course (year)	Short course (year)
50 m breaststroke	27.25 (2009)	26.55 (2008)
100 m breaststroke	1:01.35 (2005)	58.79 (2006)
4×50 m medley relay		1:32:91 (2008) WB ER
4 × 100 m medley relay	3:34.32 (2008) IR	
