= Mattia Aversa =

Italian swimmer

Personal information
- Born: 23 July 1986 (age 38)

Sport
- Country: Italy
- Sport: Swimming

Mattia Aversa (born 23 July 1986) is an Italian backstroke swimmer who competed in the 2008 Summer Olympics.
