= 2008 European Short Course Swimming Championships =

Water sport competitions

- Host city: Rijeka, Croatia
- Date: 11—14 December 2018
- Venue: Kantrida Pool
- Events: 38

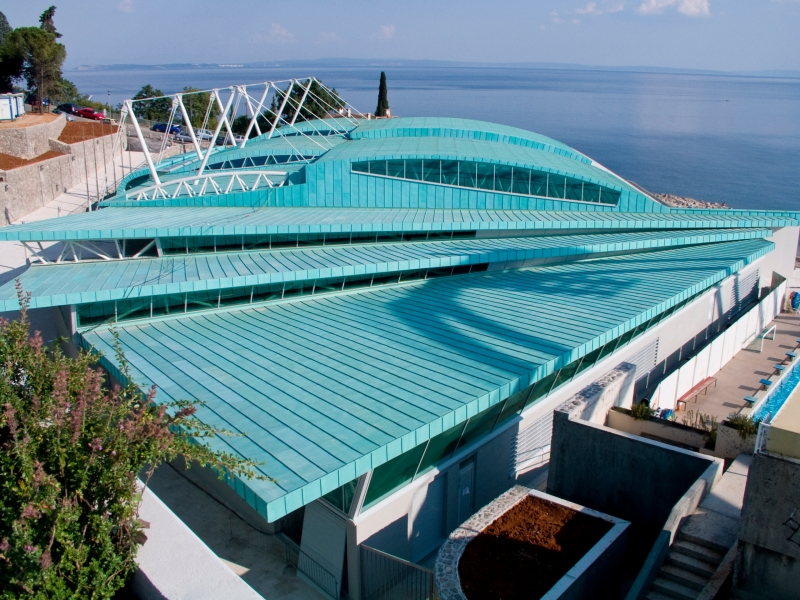
Kantrida Pool, site of the Championships

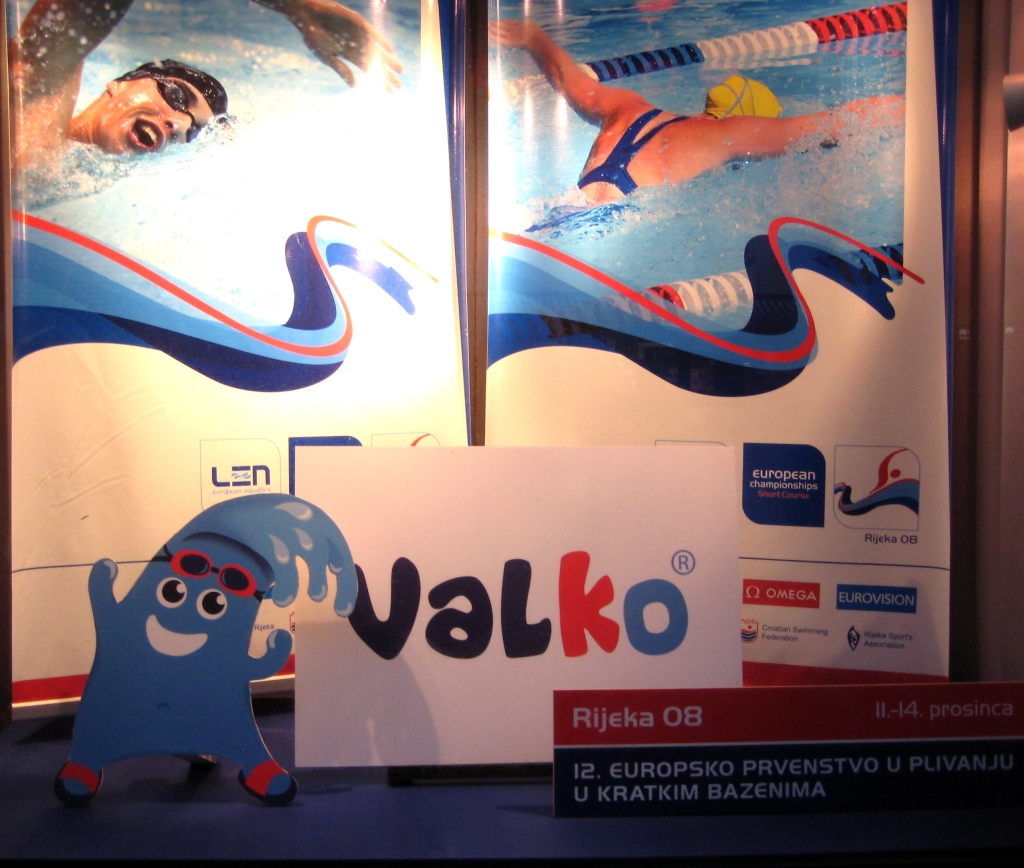
Championship mascot "Valko"

The European Short Course Swimming Championships 2008 took place in Rijeka, Croatia from 11 to 14 December 2008.

== Medal table ==
* Host nation (Croatia)

Rank	Nation	Gold	Silver	Bronze	Total
1	Russia (RUS)	8	2	4	14
2	France (FRA)	7	9	4	20
3	Italy (ITA)	5	5	8	18
4	Netherlands (NED)	5	2	2	9
5	Spain (ESP)	2	3	2	7
6	Croatia (CRO)*	2	0	2	4
7	Slovenia (SLO)	2	0	1	3
8	Germany (GER)	1	3	2	6
9	Denmark (DEN)	1	2	3	6
10	Austria (AUT)	1	2	1	4
10	Ukraine (UKR)	1	2	1	4
12	Serbia (SRB)	1	1	0	2
12	Sweden (SWE)	1	1	0	2
14	Great Britain (GBR)	1	0	4	5
15	Finland (FIN)	1	0	0	1
16	Hungary (HUN)	0	3	1	4
17	Switzerland (SUI)	0	1	1	2
18	Lithuania (LTU)	0	1	0	1
18	Norway (NOR)	0	1	0	1
20	Poland (POL)	0	0	1	1
20	Slovakia (SVK)	0	0	1	1
Totals (21 entries)		39	38	38	115

== Medal summary ==
Legend:

- WR = World record
- ER = European record
- CR = Championships record

=== Men's events ===
Event	Gold		Silver		Bronze	
50 m freestyle	Amaury Leveaux; France	20.63	Frédérick Bousquet; France	20.69	Duje Draganja; Croatia; Yevgeny Lagunov; Russia	21.15
100 m freestyle	Amaury Leveaux; France	44.94; WR	Fabien Gilot; France	45.84	Filippo Magnini; Italy	46.62
200 m freestyle	Danila Izotov; Russia	1:43.09	Dominik Meichtry; Switzerland	1:43.11	Massimiliano Rosolino; Italy	1:43.52
400 m freestyle	Paul Biedermann; Germany	3:37.73; CR	Massimiliano Rosolino; Italy	3:39.33	Mads Glæsner; Denmark	3:39.77
1500 m freestyle	Federico Colbertaldo; Italy	14:24.21	Vitaly Romanovich; Russia	14:29.64	Samuel Pizzetti; Italy	14:31.60
50 m backstroke	Stanislav Donets; Russia	23.22	Aschwin Wildeboer; Spain	23.28	Ľuboš Križko; Slovakia	23.47
100 m backstroke	Stanislav Donets; Russia	49.32; WR	Aschwin Wildeboer; Spain	49.61	Helge Meeuw; Germany	50.89
200 m backstroke	Aschwin Wildeboer; Spain; Stanislav Donets; Russia	1:49.22; CR			Pierre Roger; France	1:52.26
50 m breaststroke	Matjaž Markič; Slovenia	26.47; CR	Aleksander Hetland; Norway	26.64	Emil Tahirovič; Slovenia	26.66
100 m breaststroke	Igor Borysik; Ukraine	57.33; ER	Hugues Duboscq; France	57.64	James Gibson; Great Britain	57.91
200 m breaststroke	Hugues Duboscq; France	2:04.59; ER	Edoardo Giorgetti; Italy	2:04.98	Igor Borysik; Ukraine	2:05.47
50 m butterfly	Amaury Leveaux; France	22.23	Milorad Čavić; Serbia	22.36; NR	Rafael Muñoz Pérez; Spain	22.46
100 m butterfly	Milorad Čavić; Serbia	49.19; ER	Rafael Muñoz Pérez; Spain	49.74	Nikolay Skvortsov; Russia	49.98
200 m butterfly	Nikolay Skvortsov; Russia	1:50.60; WR	Dinko Jukić; Austria	1:52.31	Maxim Ganikhin; Russia	1:52.32
100 m individual medley	Peter Mankoč; Slovenia	51.97; ER	Christian Galenda; Italy	52.29	James Goddard; Great Britain	52.36
200 m individual medley	James Goddard; Great Britain	1:53.46	Vytautas Janušaitis; Lithuania	1:54.51	Alan Cabello Forns; Spain	1:55.70
400 m individual medley	Dinko Jukić; Austria	4:03.01	Gergő Kis; Hungary	4:03.81	Lukasz Wojt; Poland	4:05.13
4 × 50 m freestyle relay	France; Alain Bernard; Fabien Gilot; Amaury Leveaux; Frédérick Bousquet	1:20.77; WB	Italy; Alessandro Calvi; Marco Orsi; Mattia Nalesso; Filippo Magnini	1:23.37	Croatia; Duje Draganja; Alexei Puninski; Bruno Barbic; Mario Todorović	1:23.68
4 × 50 m medley relay	Italy; Mirco di Tora; Alessandro Terrin; Marco Belotti; Filippo Magnini	1:32.91; WB	Russia; Stanislav Donets; Sergey Geybel; Yevgeny Korotyshkin; Yevgeny Lagunov; Germany; Thomas Rupprath; Marco Koch; Johannes Dietrich; Steffen Deibler	1:33.31		

=== Women's events ===
Event	Gold		Silver		Bronze	
50 m freestyle	Marleen Veldhuis; Netherlands	23.55; CR	Hinkelien Schreuder; Netherlands	23.72	Jeanette Ottesen; Denmark	24.05
100 m freestyle	Marleen Veldhuis; Netherlands	51.95	Jeanette Ottesen; Denmark	52.08; NR	Ranomi Kromowidjojo; Netherlands	52.22
200 m freestyle	Federica Pellegrini; Italy	1:51.85; WR	Femke Heemskerk; Netherlands	1:53.79	Daria Belyakina; Russia	1:53.85
400 m freestyle	Coralie Balmy; France	3:56.39	Camille Muffat; France	3:57.48	Alessia Filippi; Italy	3:59.35
800 m freestyle	Alessia Filippi; Italy	8:04.53; WR	Coralie Balmy; France	8:05.32	Lotte Friis; Denmark	8:09.91
50 m backstroke	Sanja Jovanović; Croatia	26.23; WR	Kateryna Zubkova; Ukraine	26.65	Elena Gemo; Italy	26.77
100 m backstroke	Sanja Jovanović; Croatia	56.87; ER	Kateryna Zubkova; Ukraine	57.01	Laure Manaudou; France	57.16
200 m backstroke	Alexandra Putra; France	2:02.48	Alexianne Castel; France	2:03.10	Elizabeth Simmonds; Great Britain	2:03.12
50 m breaststroke	Valentina Artemyeva; Russia	29.96	Janne Schaefer; Germany	30.37	Moniek Nijhuis; Netherlands	30.45
100 m breaststroke	Valentina Artemyeva; Russia	1:05.02	Sophie de Ronchi; France	1:05.43	Mirna Jukić; Austria	1:05.64
200 m breaststroke	Alena Alekseeva; Russia	2:19.93	Mirna Jukić; Austria	2:20.48	Patrizia Humplik; Switzerland	2:21.68
50 m butterfly	Hinkelien Schreuder; Netherlands	25.21; ER	Jeanette Ottesen; Denmark	25.54	Diane Bui Duyet; France	25.55
100 m butterfly	Jeanette Ottesen; Denmark	56.70; CR NR	Diane Bui Duyet; France	56.83	Eszter Dara; Hungary	56.88
200 m butterfly	Petra Granlund; Sweden	2:04.27	Aurore Mongel; France	2:04.73	Jemma Lowe; Great Britain	2:04.78
100 m individual medley	Hanna-Maria Seppälä; Finland	59.24; CR NR	Evelyn Verrasztó; Hungary	59.49	Francesca Segat; Italy	59.61
200 m individual medley	Francesca Segat; Italy	2:07.03; ER	Evelyn Verrasztó; Hungary	2:07.93	Sophie de Ronchi; France	2:08.10
400 m individual medley	Mireia Belmonte García; Spain	4:25.06; WR	Alessia Filippi; Italy	4:26.06	Francesca Segat; Italy	4:27.12
4 × 50 m freestyle relay	Netherlands; Hinkelien Schreuder; Inge Dekker; Ranomi Kromowidjojo; Marleen Veldhuis	1:33.80; WB	Sweden; Petra Granlund; Claire Hedenskog; Sarah Sjöström; Lovisa Ericsson	1:38.00	Germany; Dorothea Brandt; Petra Dallmann; Lisa Vitting; Daniela Schreiber	1:38.06
4 × 50 m medley relay	Netherlands; Ranomi Kromowidjojo; Moniek Nijhuis; Hinkelien Schreuder; Marleen Veldhuis	1:45.73; WB	Germany; Daniela Samulski; Janne Schaefer; Lena Kalla; Petra Dallmann	1:46.84	Italy; Elena Gemo; Roberta Panara; Silvia di Pietro; Federica Pellegrini	1:47.05

== See also ==
- 2008 in swimming
