= Ákos Molnár (swimmer) =

Hungarian swimmer

Personal information
- National team: Hungary
- Born: July 22, 1987 (age 38)

Sport
- Sport: Swimming
- Strokes: breaststroke
Medal record
Men's swimming
Representing Hungary
European Junior Championships (LC)
Silver medal – second place	2004 Lisbon	100 m breaststroke
Silver medal – second place	2004 Lisbon	200 m breaststroke
Silver medal – second place	2005 Budapest	100 m breaststroke
Silver medal – second place	2005 Budapest	200 m breaststroke
Bronze medal – third place	2005 Budapest	4×100 m medley relay

Ákos Molnár (born 22 July 1987 in Szeged) is a Hungarian swimmer. At the 2012 Summer Olympics, he competed in the Men's 200 metre breaststroke, finishing in 20th place overall in the heats, failing to qualify for the semifinals.
