= Alexei Puninski =

Russian-born Croatian former swimmer (born 1985)

Personal information
- Full name: Alexei Puninski
- National team: Croatia
- Born: 11 January 1985 (age 41) Yekaterinburg, Russian SFSR, Soviet Union
- Height: 1.88 m (6 ft 2 in)
- Weight: 84 kg (185 lb)

Sport
- Sport: Swimming
- Strokes: Freestyle, butterfly
- Club: HPK Mladost
- College team: Auburn University (U.S.)
- Coach: Brett Hawke (U.S.); Richard Quick (U.S.)
Medal record
Men's swimming
Representing Croatia
European Championships (SC)
Gold medal – first place	2006 Helsinki	50 m butterfly
Silver medal – second place	2003 Dublin	50 m butterfly
Bronze medal – third place	2008 Rijeka	4×50 m freestyle
European Junior Championships
Gold medal – first place	2002 Linz	50 m butterfly

Alexei Puninski (Croatian: Aleksej Puninski, Russian: Алексей Пунинский; born 11 January 1985) is a Russian-born Croatian former swimmer, who specialized in freestyle and butterfly events, and an entrepreneur. His family moved from Russia to Croatia in 1999. He represented Croatia at the 2008 Summer Olympics, and has claimed multiple Croatian championship titles and national records in both the freestyle and butterfly (50 and 100 m). He has also won a career total of three medals (two golds and one bronze) in a major international competition, spanning the European Junior Championships and European Short Course Championships in Helsinki, Finland, with respective times of 24.57 and 23.21.

Puninski competed for Croatia in the men's 100 m butterfly at the 2008 Summer Olympics in Beijing. Leading up to the Games, he finished with a third-place time in 52.61 to dip beneath the FINA A-standard (52.86) by 0.25 of a second and earn a direct Olympic selection to the Croatian squad at the USA Swimming Grand Prix in Columbus, Ohio. Coming from third at the halfway turn on the outside in heat six, Puninski faded down the stretch to hit the wall in last place with a 53.65. Puninski failed to advance into the semifinals, as he placed forty-seventh overall out of sixty-six swimmers in the prelims.

At the 2008 European Short Course Swimming Championships in Rijeka, Puninski set a Croatian record of 22.63 seconds in the semifinals of the men's 50 m butterfly. He also won a bronze medal as a member of the Croatian team in the men's 4×50 m freestyle relay, with a time of 1:23.68.

Puninski is also an eighteen-time All-American swimmer, a full-fledged member of the Auburn Tigers, and an international business graduate at the Auburn University in Auburn, Alabama.
