= Yuliya Pidlisna =

Ukrainian swimmer (born 1987)

Personal information
- Born: May 12, 1987 (age 39) Kharkiv, Ukrainian SSR, Soviet Union
- Height: 1.71 m (5 ft 7 in)
- Weight: 59 kg (130 lb)

Sport
- Sport: Swimming
- Club: SC Ukraina, Kharkiv
Medal record
Swimming
Representing Ukraine
European Championships
Silver medal – second place	2006 Budapest	200 m breaststroke
Military World Games
Bronze medal – third place	2007 Hyderabad	100 m breaststroke
Bronze medal – third place	2007 Hyderabad	4x100 m medley
Bronze medal – third place	2007 Hyderabad	200 m breaststroke
European Junior Championships
Bronze medal – third place	2003 Glasgow	100 m breaststroke
Bronze medal – third place	2003 Glasgow	200 m breaststroke
Bronze medal – third place	2003 Glasgow	400 m medley

Yuliya Volodymyrivna Pidlisna (Ukrainian: Юлія Володимирівна Підлісна; born 12 May 1987) is a Ukrainian swimmer who won a silver medal in the 200 m breaststroke at the 2006 European Aquatics Championships. She also competed in three events at the 2008 Summer Olympics, but did not reach the finals.

In November 2003 she was banned from FINA competitions for two years after testing positive for the anabolic steroid Stanozolol at the European Junior Championships.
