= Jane Trepp =

Estonian swimmer

Personal information
- National team: Estonia
- Born: 13 March 1988 (age 38) Tallinn, then part of Estonian SSR, Soviet Union
- Height: 175 cm (5 ft 9 in)
- Spouse: Kyle Rose

Sport
- Sport: Swimming
- College team: Louisiana State University (U.S.)
Medal record
Women's swimming
Representing Estonia
European Championships (SC)
Silver medal – second place	2009 Istanbul	50 m breaststroke
European Junior Championships (LC)
Bronze medal – third place	2004 Lisbon	50 m freestyle

Jane Trepp (born 13 March 1988) is a retired Estonian swimmer.

She won a bronze medal in 50 m freestyle at the 2004 European Junior Swimming Championships and a silver medal in 50 m breaststroke at the 2009 European Short Course Swimming Championships.

She is a 34-time long course and 15-time short course Estonian swimming champion. She has broken 28 Estonian records in swimming.

== Personal ==
Her sister, Nele, was also a swimmer.

She studied at Louisiana State University, where she was a member of the swimming and diving team, and graduated in 2011. In 2013, she married a fellow LSU athlete and pole vaulter, Kyle Rose.
