= Olga Klyuchnikova =

Russian swimmer

Personal information
- Full name: Olga Yevgenievna Klyuchnikova
- National team: Russia
- Born: 1 September 1989 (age 36)

Sport
- Sport: Swimming
- Coach: G.V. Dolgova

Olga Evgenievna Klyuchnikova (born 1 September 1989, Penza, Russia) is a Russian swimmer. Five-time champion of Deaflympics (2017, Samsun)). Four-time champion of the World Swimming Championships (among deaf sportsmen) in São Paulo (Brazil, 2019). Winner of the Russian Swimming Championship for the deaf (2015). Multiple champion of Russia, record holder of Russia in swimming (among deaf sportsmen). Merited Master of Sports of Russia in the sports for the deaf (2017).

== Biography ==
Olga Klyuchnikova was born in Penza. She started swimming professionally in the Penza regional sports school in 1996 under the guidance of coach Galina Vyacheslavovna Dolgova.

She went to secondary school number 28 in Penza. In 2011 she graduated from the Faculty of Physical Education, V.G. Belinsky Penza State Pedagogical University (currently - the Institute of Sport and Physical Training PSU).

In 2005, Olga was included in the junior national team of Russia, to prepare for the European Championship among juniors. At this championship Olga won two awards - a gold and a bronze medal in relay swimming.

From 2007 to 2013 Olga was included in the first team of the Russian national team. Olga won five gold medals at the 2017 Deaflympics, 8 gold medals at the 2018 European Championship, and 10 gold medals at the 2019 World Championship.

She was a prize-winner at the European Festival in Germany in 2008 (12 awards); A winner of the Russian Swimming Championship in the 4 × 200 m freestyle relay (2008), A bronze medalist of the Russian Swimming Championship in the 4 × 100 m freestyle relay (2008), A Master of Sports of Russia of International Class in swimming, a bronze medalist of the European Championship (2009),

A participant of the World Championship 2009, participant of the European Championship 2008, 2010, participant of the World University Games 2011.

In 2015 she switched to adaptive sports.

In November 2015, she performed for the first time at the Russian Swimming Championship among deaf sportsmen (25m) in Kazan and won five gold medals (200m medley, 50m, 100m, 200m backstroke, 500m butterfly stroke).

In 2016, at the Russian Swimming Championship among deaf sportsmen (50m) in Saransk, O. Klyuchnikova won three gold medals and set up three Russian records at distances: 200m backstroke (2: 22.48), 100m freestyle (58.11), 400m medley (5:11.48).

At the Russian Swimming Championships among deaf sportsmen (25m) in Kazan, the athlete won five gold medals and set up 5 Russian records in the sport of the deaf at distances of 50m backstroke (29.47), 100m backstroke (1.02.49), 200m medley (2: 27.25), 50m butterfly stroke (28.18), 200 n/s 2: 19.41.

In April 2017, at the Russian Swimming Championship, among deaf sportsmen (50m) in Saransk (Republic of Mordovia) she won five gold medals and set up five Russian records at distances of 50m, 100m and 200m backstroke, 100m freestyle and 200m medley swimming. According to the results of the competition, she was selected to participate in the Deaflympics.

In 2017, in Samsun (Turkey) at the XXIII Summer Deaflympics (among deaf sportsmen) she won five gold medals (50m, 100m and 200m backstroke, 200m medley swimming and 4 × 100 m relay medley) and set up 9 world records.

At the 2019 World Swimming Championship among athletes with a hearing impairment in São Paulo, on the first day of the competition, she won a convincing victory, setting a world record in the 50-meter butterfly swim, and as part of the Russian national team she won the 4x200-meter freestyle relay. On the second day, Olga brought gold medals to the national team at a distance of 50 meters freestyle and 200 meters backstroke.
