= Maria Bulakhova =

Russian swimmer

Personal information
- Full name: Mariya Alekseyevna Bulakhova
- National team: Russia
- Born: 18 November 1988 (age 37) Volgograd, Russian SFSR, Soviet Union
- Height: 1.70 m (5 ft 7 in)
- Weight: 51 kg (112 lb)

Sport
- Sport: Swimming
- Strokes: Butterfly
- Club: Volga Volgograd
- Coach: Natalia Kozlova
Medal record
Women's swimming
Representing Russia
European Junior Championships
Gold medal – first place	2004 Lisbon	100 m butterfly
Silver medal – second place	2004 Lisbon	200 m butterfly

Mariya Alekseyevna Bulakhova (Russian: Мария Алексеевна Булахова; born 18 November 1988) is a Russian former swimmer, who specialized in butterfly events. She collected two medals, gold and silver, in the 100 (59.98) and 200 m butterfly (2:10.60) at the 2004 European Junior Swimming Championships in Lisbon, Portugal. Bulakhova is a member of Volga Swimming Club, and is coached and trained by Natalia Kozlova.

Bulakhova qualified for the women's 200 m butterfly, as Russia's youngest swimmer (aged 15), at the 2004 Summer Olympics in Athens, by eclipsing a FINA B-standard entry time of 2:14.07 from the European Junior Championships. She edged out Chinese Taipei's Cheng Wan-jung to lead the first heat by a 3.26-second margin in 2:12.99. Bulakhova missed the semifinals by two thirds of a second (0.66), as she placed eighteenth overall among 32 competitors in the prelims.
