= Craig Gibbons =

British swimmer

Personal information
- Full name: Craig Alexander Gibbons
- National team: Great Britain
- Born: 29 November 1985 (age 40) High Wycombe, England
- Height: 1.92 m (6 ft 4 in)
- Weight: 86 kg (190 lb; 13.5 st)

Sport
- Sport: Swimming
- Strokes: Freestyle
- Club: Maxwell Swim Club
- Coach: City of Oxford swimming club

Craig Alexander Gibbons (born 29 November 1985) is an English competitive swimmer who represented Great Britain at the 2012 Summer Olympics in London. There, Gibbons anchored the British men's team in the preliminary heats of the 4x100-metre freestyle relay event. Gibbons previously held the British record for the men's 100-metre freestyle and was part of four relay teams that also broke British records. He has competed at major meets for over 10 years and remains one of the fastest British swimmers ever.

For much of his training in the run-up to the Olympics he was based in Aylesbury, Buckinghamshire, swimming for Maxwell Swim Club. He then moved out to Dubai, United Arab Emirates where he trained his own squad with Hamilton Aquatics Swimming Club. Gibbons moved to Malta, to take over as head coach of Sirens ASC, where he led the team to their first ever National Title with swimmers under his guidance qualifying for the first time for the World Championships and the European Youth Olympic Festival. In August 2017 Gibbons was appointed head coach of a newly formed performance team in West London called Natare West London Swimming Club. He now lives in London and coaches alongside 2012 Olympic Medalist Michael Jamieson.

== Swimming career ==
International Appearances include:

- European Championships 2012 Debrecen, Hungary
- Great Britain v Russia Duel in the Pool 2011 Moscow, Russia
- Great Britain v Germany Duel in the Pool 2011 Essen, Germany
- Sarajevo Meet 2010 Sarajevo, Bosnia
- European Championships 2009 Abdi Ipekci Arena, Turkey
- Eindhoven International 2009 Eindhoven, Holland
- Eindhoven International 2008 Eindhoven, Holland
- European Championships 2008 Jovanovic Arena, Croatia
- World Championships 2008 MEN Arena, Manchester, Great Britain
- World Championships 2006 Rod Laver Arena, Melbourne, Australia
- European Championships 2004 Vienna Arena, Austria
- European Junior Championships 2004 Glasgow, Scotland
- World School Games 2002 Cannes, France
