= Daria Parshina =

Russian swimmer

Personal information
- Full name: Darya Viktorovna Parshina
- National team: Russia
- Born: 9 January 1988 (age 38) Penza, Russian SFSR, Soviet Union
- Height: 1.73 m (5 ft 8 in)
- Weight: 53 kg (117 lb)

Sport
- Sport: Swimming
- Strokes: Freestyle
- Club: Penza Army Sports Club
- Coach: Natalia Kozlova
Medal record
Women's swimming
Representing Russia
European Championships (SC)
Silver medal – second place	2004 Vienna	400 m freestyle
European Junior Championships
Gold medal – first place	2004 Lisbon	400 m freestyle

Darya Viktorovna Parshina (Russian: Дарья Викторовна Паршина; born 9 January 1988) is a Russian former swimmer, who specialized in long-distance freestyle events. She set a junior European record of 4:10.79 to claim the 400 m freestyle title at the 2004 European Junior Swimming Championships in Lisbon, Portugal. She is a member of the Penza Army Sports Club, and is trained by her long-time coach and mentor Natalia Kozlova.

Parshina qualified for the women's 400 m freestyle, as a 16-year-old, at the 2004 Summer Olympics in Athens. She eclipsed a FINA B-standard entry time of 4:14.41 from the Russian Championships in Moscow. She challenged seven other swimmers on the fourth heat, including top medal favorites Otylia Jędrzejczak of Poland and Kaitlin Sandeno of the United States. She rounded out the field to last place by a 5.21-second margin behind Spain's Erika Villaécija García in 4:18.24. Parshina failed to advance into the final, as she placed twenty-fifth overall in the preliminaries.

Four months after the Olympics, Parshina earned a silver medal in the same program at the 2004 European Short Course Swimming Championships in Vienna, Austria. She set a short-course personal best of 4:04.56, just nearly a second behind winner Keri-Anne Payne of Great Britain.
