= Maria Gromova (swimmer) =

Russian backstroke and relay swimmer (born 1988)

Personal information
- Full name: Maria Sergeyevna Gromova
- Nationality: Russia
- Born: 28 February 1988 (age 38) Moscow, Russia
- Height: 1.70 m (5 ft 7 in)
- Weight: 62 kg (137 lb)

Sport
- Sport: Swimming
- Strokes: Backstroke
- Club: Dynamo Moskva (RUS)

Maria Sergeyevna Gromova (Russian: Мария Серге́евна Громова; born February 28, 1988, in Moscow) is a Russian backstroke and relay swimmer, who was selected to the national team to qualify for the 2012 Summer Olympics in London. She competed in the women's 4 × 100 m medley relay, along with her teammates Yuliya Yefimova, Irina Bespalova, and Veronika Popova. She and her team placed eighth in the heats, with a time of 3:59.57, and qualified for the finals. Although she competed only as an alternate, Gromova supported her team in the finals, but missed out of the medal podium, finishing behind Japan in fourth place.

Gromova is a sports science student at Russian State University of Physical Culture, Sport and Tourism in Moscow, and works as a coach. She is currently a member of Dynamo Moskva, being trained by Svetlana Grishina.
