= List of Welsh records in swimming =

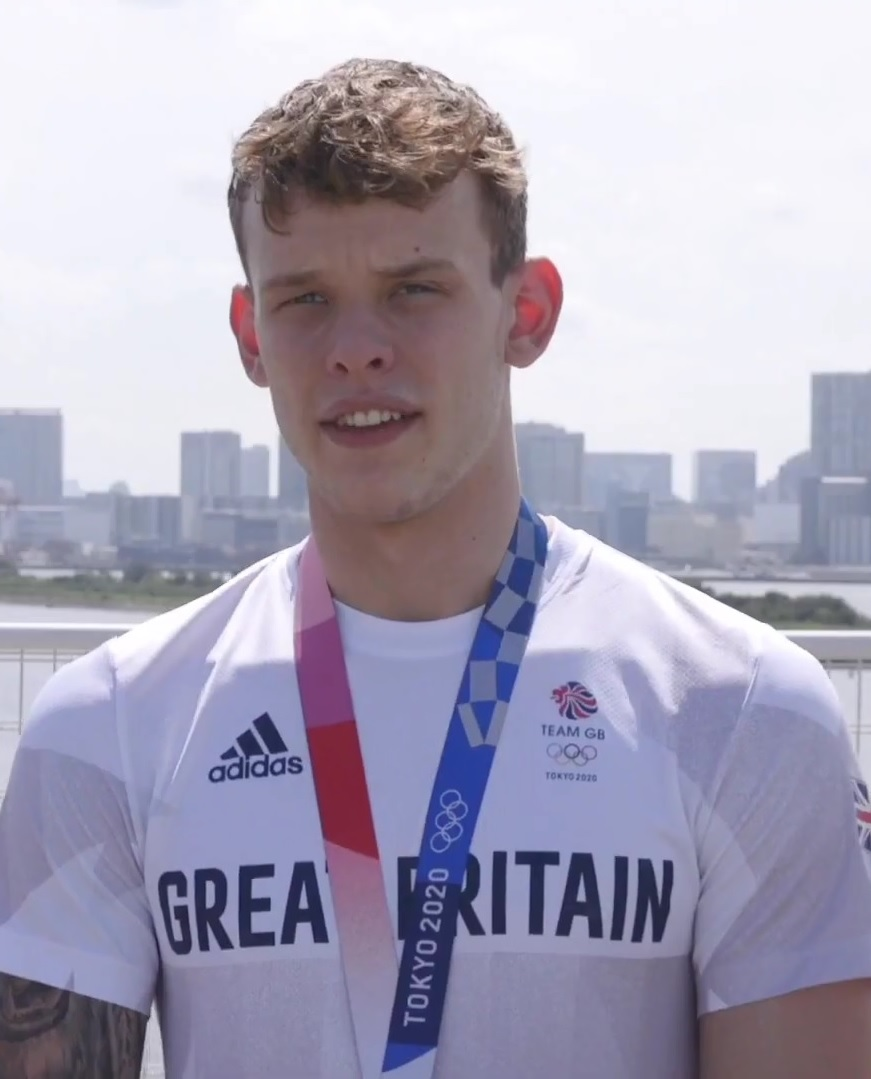
Matt Richards (pictured) holds the most Welsh swimming records with 13.

The Welsh records in swimming are ratified by Wales' governing body in swimming, Swim Wales. Records can be set in long course (50 metres) or short course (25 metres) swimming pools, with records currently recorded in the following events for both men and women.

- Freestyle: 50 m, 100 m, 200 m, 400 m, 800 m, 1500 m
- Backstroke: 50 m, 100 m, 200 m
- Breaststroke: 50 m, 100 m, 200 m
- Butterfly: 50 m, 100 m, 200 m
- Individual medley: 200 m, 400 m
- Relays: 4 × 100 m freestyle, 4 × 200 m freestyle, 4 × 100 m medley
- Mixed relays: 4 × 100 m freestyle (long course only), 4 × 100 m medley (long course only)

The relay records displayed here are the official national relay records. However, Swim Wales maintains a separate set of national relay records for club teams, which are not shown here. Records can also be set at intermediate distances in an individual race and for the first leg of a relay race.

The ratification process involves the swimmer submitting an application to Swim Wales, providing details such as the swimmer's name(s), time swum, date and location of the swim, names of officials, and the swimsuit model worn. Once ratified, the records appear on the official records listing. Records that have not yet been fully ratified are marked with a '#' symbol in these lists, and all records were achieved in finals unless otherwise noted.

Freestyler and butterfly swimmer Matt Richards holds the most Welsh records with eight individual and thirteen in total. He is followed by Chloé Tutton with ten records to her name and Theodora Taylor and Jazmin Carlin who both currently hold seven Welsh records each, as of June 2026.

Welsh swimming records have been set in a total of 82 events. Welsh records have not been recorded in the mixed 4 × 200 m freestyle relay long course event, the men's and women's 100 m individual medley short course events, the men's, women's and mixed 4 × 50 m freestyle and medley relay short course events and the mixed 4 × 100 m medley relay short course event.

Currently there are no Welsh records that are also world, European or Commonwealth records however there are currently eight British records with Richards, Carlin and David Davies holding two each with one each by Jemma Lowe and Tyler Melbourne-Smith.

Five records still stand that were set by swimmers wearing bodysuits or suits made of polyurethane or other non-textile materials permitted between February 2008 until December 2009. On the eve of the 2009 World Aquatics Championships in Rome, FINA voted to ban the use of bodysuits and all suits made of non-textile materials starting 1 January 2010.

The oldest Welsh swimming record that still stands is the 4 × 100 m freestyle relay long course relay record of 3:26.48 set by the City of Cardiff swim team at the 1992 ASA National Winter Championships.

== Long course (50 m) ==
=== Men ===
List of Welsh men's long course swimming records
Event	Time		Name	Club	Date	Meet	Location	Ref
50 m freestyle	21.83		Matt Richards	Millfield	6 April 2024	British Championships	London, United Kingdom	
100 m freestyle	47.45	NR	Matt Richards	Great Britain	27 July 2023	World Championships	Fukuoka, Japan	
200 m freestyle	1:44.30		Matt Richards	Great Britain	25 July 2023	World Championships	Fukuoka, Japan	
400 m freestyle	3:45.24	ss	David Davies	City of Cardiff	16 March 2009	British Championships	Sheffield, United Kingdom	
800 m freestyle	7:44.32	ss, NR	David Davies	Great Britain	29 July 2009	World Championships	Rome, Italy	
1500 m freestyle	14:45.95	NR	David Davies	Great Britain	21 August 2004	Olympic Games	Athens, Greece	
50 m backstroke	25.03		Marco Loughran	Guildford City	28 June 2013	British Championships	Sheffield, United Kingdom	
100 m backstroke	54.26		Marco Loughran	Guildford City	27 June 2013	British Championships	Sheffield, United Kingdom	
200 m backstroke	1:58.16	h	Marco Loughran	Guildford City	2 April 2008	British Championships	Sheffield, United Kingdom	
50 m breaststroke	27.66	h	Kyle Booth	RAF Swim	15 April 2026	British Championships	London, United Kingdom	
100 m breaststroke	1:00.71	sf	Robert Holderness	Wales	25 July 2014	Commonwealth Games	Glasgow, United Kingdom	
200 m breaststroke	2:10.61		Robert Holderness	Millfield	28 June 2013	British Championships	Sheffield, United Kingdom	
50 m butterfly	23.53		Lewis Fraser	Swansea University	22 February 2025	McCullagh International Meet	Bangor, United Kingdom	
100 m butterfly	51.81		Lewis Fraser	Swansea University	17 April 2026	British Championships	London, United Kingdom	
200 m butterfly	1:59.10		Thomas Allen	Flintshire	30 July 2009	ASA National Youth Championships	Sheffield, United Kingdom	
200 m individual medley	1:58.63		Ieuan Lloyd	City of Cardiff	29 June 2013	British Championships	Sheffield, United Kingdom	
400 m individual medley	4:11.32	h, ss	Thomas Haffield	Great Britain	2 August 2009	World Championships	Rome, Italy	
4 × 100 m freestyle relay	3:15.79		Dan Jones (49.71); Matt Richards (47.49); Tom Carswell (49.50); Calum Jarvis (49.09)	Wales	30 July 2022	Commonwealth Games	Birmingham, United Kingdom	
4 × 200 m freestyle relay	7:09.59		Matt Richards (1:45.42); Dan Jones (1:49.13); Kieran Bird (1:47.54); Tyler Melbourne-Smith (1:47.50)	Wales	26 July 2026	Commonwealth Games	Glasgow, United Kingdom	
4 × 100 m medley relay	3:36.43		Joe Small (55.02); Kyle Booth (1:01.12); Lewis Fraser (52.31); Matt Richards (47.98)	Wales	3 August 2022	Commonwealth Games	Birmingham, United Kingdom	

Legend: # – Record awaiting ratification by Swim Wales; WR – World record; ER – European record; CR – Commonwealth record; NR – British record; ss – set in a now banned super suit;
Records not set in finals: h – heat; sf – semifinal; r – relay 1st leg; rh – relay heat 1st leg; b – B final; † – en route to final mark; so – swim-off; tt – time trial

=== Women ===
List of Welsh women's long course swimming records
Event	Time		Name	Club	Date	Meet	Location	Ref
50 m freestyle	24.59		Theodora Taylor	Torfaen Dolphins	19 April 2026	British Championships	London, United Kingdom	
100 m freestyle	54.00		Theodora Taylor	Wales	27 July 2026	Commonwealth Games	Glasgow, United Kingdom	
200 m freestyle	1:56.88		Jazmin Carlin	Bath University	18 April 2015	British Championships	London, United Kingdom	
400 m freestyle	4:01.23		Jazmin Carlin	Great Britain	7 August 2016	Olympic Games	Rio de Janeiro, Brazil	
800 m freestyle	8:15.54		Jazmin Carlin	Great Britain	21 August 2014	European Championships	Berlin, Germany	
1500 m freestyle	15:47.26	NR	Jazmin Carlin	Swansea University	28 June 2013	British Championships	Sheffield, United Kingdom	
50 m backstroke	27.21	h	Georgia Davies	Great Britain	4 August 2018	European Championships	Glasgow, United Kingdom	
100 m backstroke	59.24		Medi Harris	Swansea University	25 February 2022	McCullagh International Meet	Bangor, United Kingdom	
200 m backstroke	2:10.52		Medi Harris	Loughborough University	16 December 2023	NSC Winter Festival Open Meet	Corby, United Kingdom	
50 m breaststroke	31.03	ss, sf	Lowri Tynan	Great Britain	1 August 2009	World Championships	Rome, Italy	
100 m breaststroke	1:06.88	h	Chloé Tutton	Great Britain	7 August 2016	Olympic Games	Rio de Janeiro, Brazil	
200 m breaststroke	2:22.34		Chloé Tutton	City of Cardiff	13 April 2016	British Championships	Glasgow, United Kingdom	
50 m butterfly	26.20		Harriet Jones	Wales	1 August 2022	Commonwealth Games	Birmingham, United Kingdom	
100 m butterfly	57.43		Jemma Lowe	Swansea PC	14 June 2011	ASA National Championships	Sheffield, United Kingdom	
200 m butterfly	2:05.36		Jemma Lowe	Swansea PC	17 June 2011	ASA National Championships	Sheffield, United Kingdom	
200 m individual medley	2:13.35		Theodora Taylor	Torfaen Dolphins	18 April 2026	British Championships	London, United Kingdom	
400 m individual medley	4:47.58		Rachel Williams	Bath University	4 August 2013	ASA National Championships	Sheffield, United Kingdom	
4 × 100 m freestyle relay	3:39.81		Theodora Taylor (54.14); Meghan Higgs (55.17); Bex Sutton (54.93); Sophie Davies (55.57)	Wales	24 July 2026	Commonwealth Games	Glasgow, United Kingdom	
4 × 200 m freestyle relay	8:03.00		Kathryn Greenslade (1:59.95); Ellena Jones (2:01.00); Jazmin Carlin (1:59.47); Chloé Tutton (2:02.58)	Wales	7 April 2018	Commonwealth Games	Gold Coast, Australia	
4 × 100 m medley relay	4:00.75		Georgia Davies (1:00.34); Chloé Tutton (1:07.39); Alys Thomas (57.29); Kathryn Greenslade (55.73)	Wales	10 April 2018	Commonwealth Games	Gold Coast, Australia	

Legend: # – Record awaiting ratification by Swim Wales; WR – World record; ER – European record; CR – Commonwealth record; NR – British record; ss – set in a now banned super suit;
Records not set in finals: h – heat; sf – semifinal; r – relay 1st leg; rh – relay heat 1st leg; b – B final; † – en route to final mark; so – swim-off; tt – time trial

=== Mixed relay ===
List of Welsh mixed long course swimming records
Event	Time	Name	Club	Date	Meet	Location	Ref
4 × 100 m freestyle relay	3:24.33	Matt Richards (47.62); Dan Jones (49.17); Bex Sutton (54.91); Theodora Taylor (52.63)	Wales	25 July 2026	Commonwealth Games	Glasgow, United Kingdom	
4 × 100 m medley relay	3:47.76	Medi Harris (59.48); Kyle Booth (1:01.68); Harriet Jones (58.26); Matt Richards (48.34)	Wales	2 August 2022	Commonwealth Games	Birmingham, United Kingdom	

Legend: # – Record awaiting ratification by Swim Wales; WR – World record; ER – European record; CR – Commonwealth record; NR – British record;
Records not set in finals: h – heat; sf – semifinal; r – relay 1st leg; rh – relay heat 1st leg; b – B final; † – en route to final mark; so – swim-off; tt – time trial

== Short course (25 m) ==
=== Men ===
List of Welsh men's short course swimming records
Event	Time		Name	Club	Date	Meet	Location	Ref
50 m freestyle	21.09	rh	Matt Richards	Great Britain	5 December 2023	European Championships	Otopeni, Romania	
100 m freestyle	45.82	NR	Matt Richards	Great Britain	6 December 2025	European Championships	Lublin, Poland	
200 m freestyle	1:41.01		Matt Richards	Great Britain	9 December 2023	European Championships	Otopeni, Romania	
400 m freestyle	3:36.09		Tyler Melbourne-Smith	Loughborough University	11 December 2025	Swim England National Winter Championships	Sheffield, United Kingdom	
800 m freestyle	7:33.56	NR	Tyler Melbourne-Smith	Loughborough University	14 December 2025	Swim England National Winter Championships	Sheffield, United Kingdom	
1500 m freestyle	14:30.47		Daniel Jervis	Great Britain	13 December 2022	World Championships	Melbourne, Australia	
50 m backstroke	24.04	sf	Marco Loughran	Great Britain	12 December 2008	European Championships	Rijeka, Croatia	
100 m backstroke	51.81		Marco Loughran	Guildford	7 December 2013	Guilford Regional Championships		
200 m backstroke	1:53.40	h	Marco Loughran	Great Britain	11 December 2008	European Championships	Rijeka, Croatia	
50 m breaststroke	26.87		Lewis Fraser	Swansea University	15 December 2023	Swim Wales Winter Championships	Swansea, United Kingdom	
100 m breaststroke	58.29		Lewis Fraser	Swansea University	16 December 2023	Swim Wales Winter Championships	Swansea, United Kingdom	
200 m breaststroke	2:08.21		Robert Holderness	Millfield	20 December 2015	ASA National Winter Championships	Sheffield, United Kingdom	
50 m butterfly	22.70	h	Matt Richards	Great Britain	25 October 2025	World Cup	Toronto, Canada	
100 m butterfly	50.86		Matt Richards	Millfield	11 December 2022	Scottish Championships	Glasgow, United Kingdom	
200 m butterfly	1:54.39		Thomas Laxton	Loughborough University	14 December 2013	Scottish Championships	Edinburgh, United Kingdom	
100 m individual medley								
200 m individual medley	1:55.41		Ieuan Lloyd	City of Cardiff	16 November 2014	BUCS Championships	Sheffield, United Kingdom	
400 m individual medley	4:05.78	ss	Thomas Haffield	European Select Team	18 December 2009	Duel in the Pool	Manchester, Great Britain	
4 × 100 m freestyle relay	3:26.48			City of Cardiff	13 December 1992	ASA National Winter Championships	Sheffield, United Kingdom	
4 × 200 m freestyle relay	7:22.16		Lewis Smith (54.21); Oliver Tennant (55.04); Daniel Woods (53.91); Ieuan Lloyd (50.76)	Wales	11 September 2011	Commonwealth Youth Games	Douglas, Isle of Man	
4 × 100 m medley relay	3:46.31			City of Swansea	20 December 1996	ASA National Winter Championships	Sheffield, United Kingdom	

Legend: # – Record awaiting ratification by Swim Wales; WR – World record; ER – European record; CR – Commonwealth record; NR – British record; ss – set in a now banned super suit;
Records not set in finals: h – heat; sf – semifinal; r – relay 1st leg; rh – relay heat 1st leg; b – B final; † – en route to final mark; so – swim-off; tt – time trial

=== Women ===
List of Welsh women's short course swimming records
Event	Time		Name	Club	Date	Meet	Location	Ref
50 m freestyle	24.84		Theodora Taylor	Torfaen Dolphins	15 November 2025	South East Wales Regional Short Course Championships	Newport, United Kingdom	
100 m freestyle	53.09		Theodora Taylor	Swim Wales East	5 October 2025	Swim England National County Team Championships	Sheffield, United Kingdom	
200 m freestyle	1:54.67		Kathryn Greenslade	Edinburgh University	11 November 2017	BUCS Championships	Sheffield, United Kingdom	
400 m freestyle	3:58.07		Jazmin Carlin	Europe All-Stars	11 December 2015	Duel in the Pool	Indianapolis, United States	
800 m freestyle	8:08.16	NR	Jazmin Carlin	Great Britain	4 December 2014	World Championships	Doha, Qatar	
1500 m freestyle	16:34.01		Grace Kinnell	Bracknell & Wokingham	4 November 2018	City of Cardiff Capital Open Meet	Cardiff, United Kingdom	
50 m backstroke	26.13		Georgia Davies	Great Britain	4 October 2018	World Cup	Budapest, Hungary	
100 m backstroke	56.45		Georgia Davies	Great Britain	7 December 2016	World Championships	Windsor, Canada	
200 m backstroke	2:02.45		Medi Harris	Great Britain	7 December 2023	European Championships	Otopeni, Romania	
50 m breaststroke	30.60	†	Chloé Tutton	Great Britain	10 December 2016	World Championships	Windsor, Canada	
100 m breaststroke	1:04.79		Chloé Tutton	Great Britain	10 December 2016	World Championships	Windsor, Canada	
200 m breaststroke	2:18.83		Chloé Tutton	Great Britain	11 December 2016	World Championships	Windsor, Canada	
50 m butterfly	26.02		Harriet West	London Roar	19 October 2020	International Swimming League	Budapest, Hungary	
100 m butterfly	56.32		Jemma Lowe	Great Britain	15 December 2013	European Championships	Herning, Denmark	
200 m butterfly	2:03.19	NR	Jemma Lowe	Great Britain	12 December 2012	World Championships	Istanbul, Turkey	
100 m individual medley								
200 m individual medley	2:10.86		Theodora Taylor	Torfaen Dolphins	15 November 2025	South East Wales Regional Short Course Championships	Newport, United Kingdom	
400 m individual medley	4:45.46		Julie Gould	Guildford	28 May 2005	Guildford City Open	Guildford, United Kingdom	
4 × 100 m freestyle relay	3:46.99		Siwan Thomas-Howells (57.93); Sian Morgan (56.19); Ellena Jones (57.13); Chloé Tutton (55.74)	Wales	9 September 2011	Commonwealth Youth Games	Douglas, Isle of Man	
4 × 200 m freestyle relay	8:07.35		Sian Morgan (1:59.79); Ellena Jones (2:02.37); Chloé Tutton (2:02.36); Siwan Thomas-Howells (2:02.83)	Wales	10 September 2011	Commonwealth Youth Games	Douglas, Isle of Man	
4 × 100 m medley relay	4:11.74	#	Charlotte Bryan (1:03.26); Sara Lougher (1:08.91); Chloé Tutton (1:02.41); Siwan Thomas-Howells (57.16)	Wales	11 September 2011	Commonwealth Youth Games	Douglas, Isle of Man	
4 × 100 m medley relay	4:22.79		Charlotte Niblett; Mirelle Evans; Kathryn Owens; Catrin Davies	-	20 July 1996	-	Swansea, United Kingdom	

Legend: # – Record awaiting ratification by Swim Wales; WR – World record; ER – European record; CR – Commonwealth record; NR – British record;
Records not set in finals: h – heat; sf – semifinal; r – relay 1st leg; rh – relay heat 1st leg; b – B final; † – en route to final mark; so – swim-off; tt – time trial

== Multiple record holders ==
=== By athlete (men) ===
List of multiple male Welsh swimming record holders
Record count	Name (last record)	Events
13	Matt Richards (2025)	50 m freestyle LC; 100 m freestyle LC; 200 m freestyle LC; 4 × 100 m freestyle relay LC; 4 × 200 m freestyle relay LC; 4 × 100 m medley relay LC; Mixed 4 × 100 m freestyle relay LC; Mixed 4 × 100 m medley relay LC; 50 m freestyle SC; 100 m freestyle SC; 200 m freestyle SC; 50 m butterfly SC; 100 m butterfly SC
6	Marco Loughran (2013)	50 m backstroke LC; 100 m backstroke LC; 200 m backstroke LC; 50 m backstroke SC; 100 m backstroke SC; 200 m backstroke SC
5	Lewis Fraser (2026)	50 m butterfly LC; 100 m butterfly LC; 4 × 100 m medley relay LC; 50 m butterfly SC; 100 m butterfly SC
3	David Davies (2009)	400 m freestyle LC; 800 m freestyle LC; 1500 m freestyle LC
3	Kyle Booth (2026)	50 m breaststroke LC; 4 × 100 m medley relay LC; Mixed 4 × 100 m medley relay LC
3	Robert Holderness (2015)	100 m breaststroke LC; 200 m breaststroke LC; 200 m breaststroke SC
3	Ieuan Lloyd (2014)	200 m individual medley LC; 200 m individual medley SC; 4 × 200 m freestyle relay SC
3	Dan Jones (2022)	4 × 100 m freestyle relay LC; 4 × 200 m freestyle relay LC; Mixed 4 × 100 m freestyle relay LC
2	Thomas Haffield (2009)	400 m individual medley LC; 400 m individual medley SC
2	Calum Jarvis (2022)	4 × 100 m freestyle relay LC; 4 × 200 m freestyle relay LC
2	Tyler Melbourne-Smith (2025)	400 m freestyle SC; 800 m freestyle SC

=== By athlete (women) ===
List of multiple female Welsh swimming record holders
Record count	Name (last record)	Events
10	Chloé Tutton (2018)	100 m breaststroke LC; 200 m breaststroke LC; 4 × 200 m freestyle relay LC; 4 × 100 m medley relay LC; 50 m breaststroke SC; 100 m breaststroke SC; 200 m breaststroke SC; 4 × 100 m freestyle relay SC; 4 × 200 m freestyle relay SC; 4 × 100 m medley relay SC
7	Theodora Taylor (2026)	50 m freestyle LC; 100 m freestyle LC; 200 m individual medley LC; 4 × 100 m freestyle relay LC; 50 m freestyle SC; 100 m freestyle SC; 200 m individual medley SC
7	Jazmin Carlin (2018)	200 m freestyle LC; 400 m freestyle LC; 800 m freestyle LC; 1500 m freestyle LC; 4 × 200 m freestyle relay LC; 400 m freestyle SC; 800 m freestyle SC
6	Medi Harris (2026)	100 m backstroke LC; 200 m backstroke LC; 4 × 100 m freestyle relay LC; Mixed 4 × 100 m freestyle relay LC; Mixed 4 × 100 m medley relay LC; 200 m backstroke SC
4	Georgia Davies (2023)	50 m backstroke LC; 4 × 100 m medley relay LC; 50 m backstroke SC; 100 m backstroke SC
4	Jemma Lowe (2013)	100 m butterfly LC; 200 m butterfly LC; 100 m butterfly SC; 200 m butterfly SC
3	Kathryn Greenslade (2018)	4 × 200 m freestyle relay LC; 4 × 100 m medley relay LC; 200 m freestyle SC
3	Ellena Jones (2018)	4 × 200 m freestyle relay LC; 4 × 100 m freestyle relay SC; 4 × 200 m freestyle relay SC
3	Siwan Thomas-Howells (2011)	4 × 100 m freestyle relay SC; 4 × 200 m freestyle relay SC; 4 × 100 m medley relay SC
2	Harriet Jones (2022)	50 m butterfly LC; Mixed 4 × 100 m medley relay LC
2	Sian Morgan (2014)	4 × 100 m freestyle relay SC; 4 × 200 m freestyle relay SC
