= British Swimming Championships (50 m) 2008 =

The British Swimming Championships (50 m) 2008 were held at the Ponds Forge International Sports Centre, Sheffield from 31 March to 6 April 2008. They also doubled as the trials for the Beijing Olympic Games.

To qualify for the Olympic team, swimmers had to achieve the FINA A standards in the heats, and finish in the first 2 in the respective final. Three swimmers (Liam Tancock, 100 m backstroke, David Davies 1500 m free, and Kirsty Balfour, 200 m breaststroke) pre-qualified due to their performances in the 2007 World Championships.

== Medal winners ==
=== Men's events ===
Event	Gold		Silver		Bronze	
50 m freestyle	Mark Foster	22.30	Simon Burnett	22.38	Matthew Tutty	22.46
100 m freestyle	Benjamin Hockin	49.63	Adam Brown	49.64	Simon Burnett	49.65
200 m freestyle	Ross Davenport	1:47.66	Robert Renwick	1:48.29	David Carry	1:48.54
400 m freestyle	David Carry	3:49.78	Dean Milwain	3:50.50	Robert Renwick	3:51.80
1500 m freestyle	Richard Charlesworth	15:10.99	Daniel Fogg	15:12.85	Christopher Alderton	15:29.08
100 m backstroke	Gregor Tait	54.22	Matthew Clay	54.35	Marco Loughran	54.57
200 m backstroke	Gregor Tait	1:56.67	James Goddard	1:56.82	Marco Loughran	1:58.34
100 m breaststroke	Chris Cook	59.88	Kristopher Gilchrist	1:01.06	James Gibson	1:01.36
200 m breaststroke	Kristopher Gilchrist	2:10.44	James Kirton	2:13.47	Craig Elliot	2:15.23
100 m butterfly	Michael Rock	52.30	Todd Cooper	52.33	Matthew Bowe	52.82
200 m butterfly	Michael Rock	1:56.92	Joseph Roebuck	1:58.91	Todd Cooper	1:58.96
200 m individual medley	James Goddard	1:57.72	Liam Tancock	1:57.96	Michael Jamieson	2:03.74
400 m individual medley	Thomas Haffield	4:14.01	Euan Dale	4:16.33	Joseph Roebuck	4:18.05

=== Women's events ===
Event	Gold		Silver		Bronze	
50 m freestyle	Francesca Halsall	24.79	Katy Sexton	25.51	Emma Wilkins	25.90
100 m freestyle	Caitlin McClatchey	54.58	Francesca Halsall	54.81	Julia Beckett	55.86
200 m freestyle	Rebecca Adlington	1:57.94	Caitlin McClatchey	1:58.22	Joanne Jackson	1:58.77
400 m freestyle	Rebecca Adlington	4:04.50	Joanne Jackson	4:08.75	Caitlin McClatchey	4:14.77
800 m freestyle	Rebecca Adlington	8:20.29	Cassandra Patten	8:29.83	Joanne Jackson	8:38.05
100 m backstroke	Gemma Spofforth	59.90	Elizabeth Simmonds	1:00.66	Katy Sexton	1:01.56
200 m backstroke	Elizabeth Simmonds	2:08.99	Gemma Spofforth	2:09.70	Stephanie Proud	2:11.10
100 m breaststroke	Kate Haywood	1:07.84	Kirsty Balfour	1:08.05	Georgia Holderness	1:08.76
200 m breaststroke	Georgia Holderness	2:29.99	Emma Bird	2:30.10	Charlotte Barnes	2:32.33
100 m butterfly	Francesca Halsall	58.16	Jemma Lowe	58.27	Ellen Gandy	58.49
200 m butterfly	Jemma Lowe	2:07.61	Ellen Gandy	2:07.69	Jessica Dickons	2:10.11
200 m individual medley	Hannah Miley	2:12.17	Keri-Anne Payne	2:12.43	Terri Dunning	2:14.35
400 m individual medley	Hannah Miley	4:37.41	Keri-Anne Payne	4:38.30	Emma Smithurst	4:47.28

== See also ==
- British Swimming
- List of British Swimming Championships champions
- 2008 in swimming
