= 2009 Duel in the Pool =

2009 British Gas Duel in the Pool
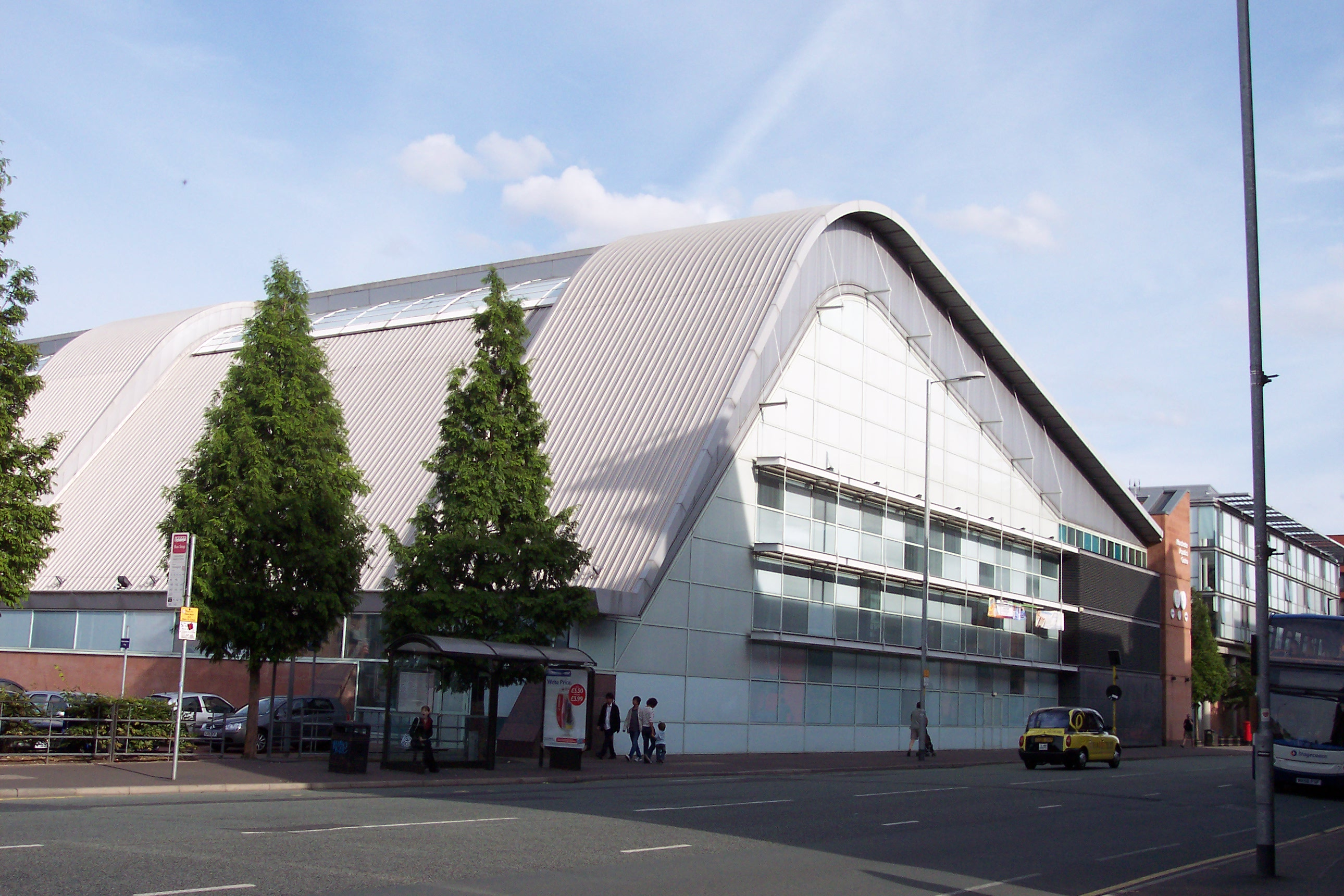
- Host city: Manchester, United Kingdom
- Date: 18–19 December 2009
- Venue: Manchester Aquatics Centre
- Teams: E-Stars; United States
- Athletes: 70
- Events: 30

The 2009 Duel in the Pool was a swimming competition between a team from the United States and a combined British, German and Italian "E-Stars" team held on Friday 18 and Saturday 19 December 2009 at the Manchester Aquatics Centre, United Kingdom. The naming rights are held by Mutual of Omaha and British Gas in the United States and Europe respectively – the event was therefore promoted as the 2009 Mutual of Omaha Duel in the Pool and 2009 British Gas Duel in the Pool.

The duel was won by the United States with a final score of 185–78, with eight short course world records broken – all by the USA team.

== Background ==
In March 2009 it was announced that British Swimming were looking at proposals to host a Duel in the Pool style meet between the US and a combined European team in Manchester, dubbed the Ryder Cup of swimming. On 21 October 2009, it was announced that a Duel in the Pool will take place between a "European select team" and the US in Manchester on 18 and 19 December 2009. This event will include the first competitive performance by Michael Phelps in Britain.

== Teams ==
=== E-Stars ===
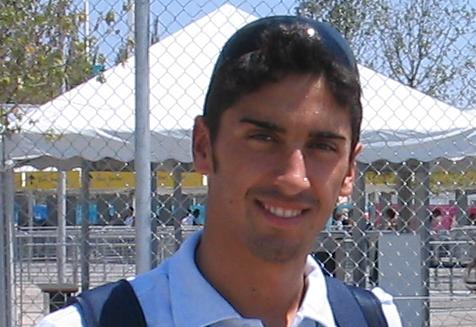
Filippo Magnini

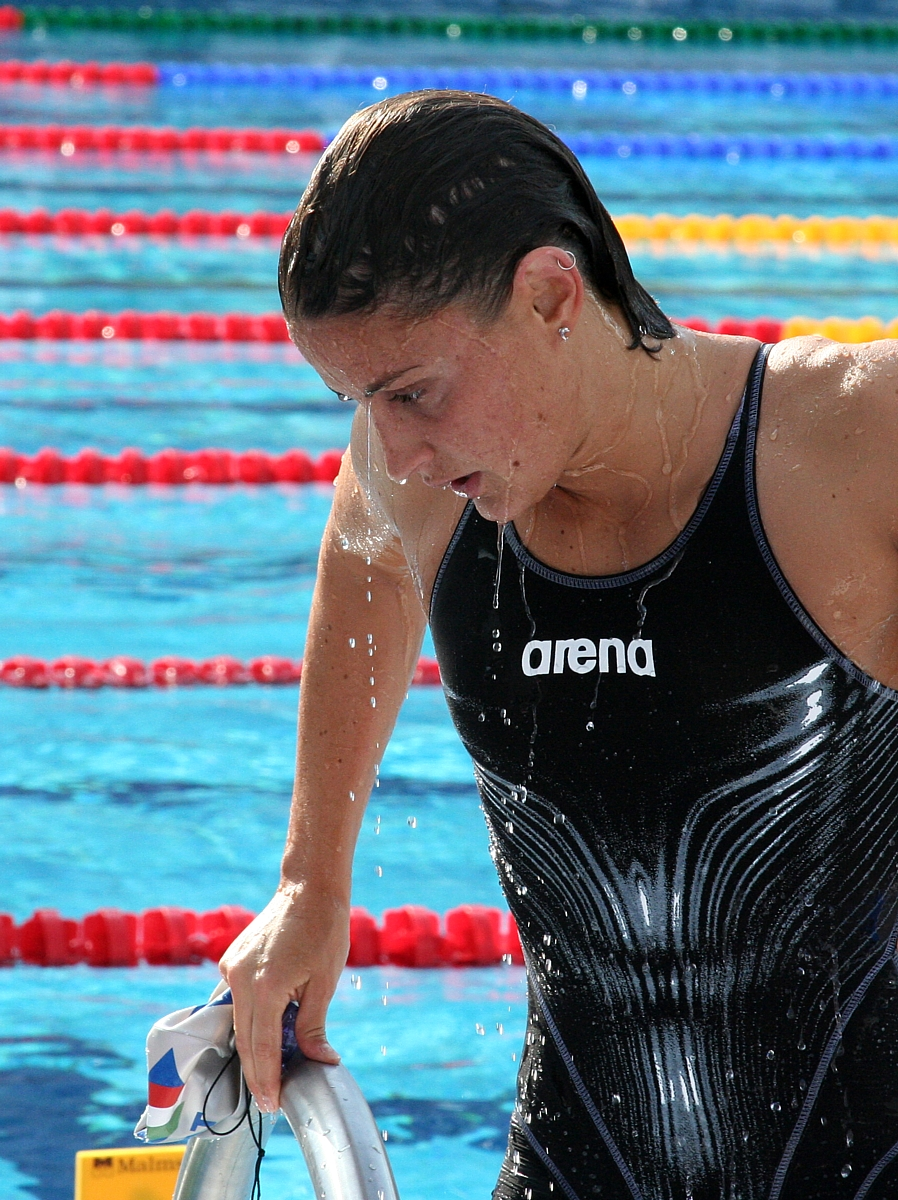
Francesca Segat

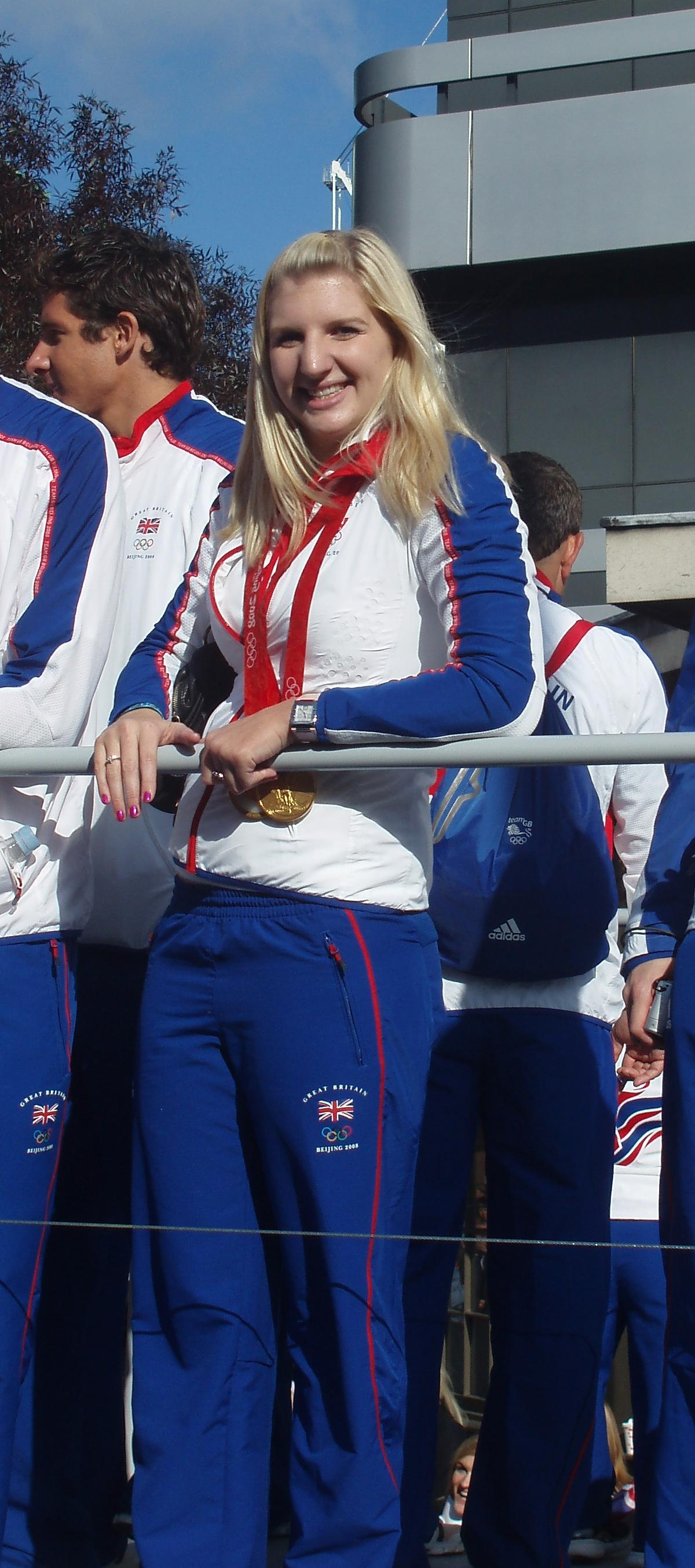
Rebecca Adlington

The E-Stars team was announced on 25 November following a delay in confirming availability of some of the originally selected swimmers. It was originally intended that the European team would include 12 swimmers from each of the three participating nations, however the team list included fourteen each from Great Britain and Italy, with just eight from Germany.

Middle-distance freestyle swimmers Joanne Jackson (GBR) and Federica Pellegrini (ITA) were originally included on the team list, however their withdrawals were announced on 4 December – Jackson due to recovering from a lung infection, and Pellegrini due to a clash with an awards dinner in Italy. Jackson's position in the team was filled by Jazmin Carlin (GBR). German Steffen Deibler was present on the original team list, however he withdrew from the event due to illness on 14 December and was replaced by Marco Orsi of Italy. Alessia Filippi (ITA) also withdrew due to illness on this date. Keri-Anne Payne (GBR) was drafted into the team as a replacement for Filippi just a few days prior to the start of the competition. The final team list consisted of 13 Italian, 7 German and 15 British members.

Men

- Federico Colbertaldo (ITA)
- David Davies (GBR)
- Hendrik Feldwehr (GER)
- Christian Galenda (ITA)
- Edoardo Giorgetti (ITA)
- James Goddard (GBR)
- Thomas Haffield (GBR)
- Marco Koch (GER)
- Filippo Magnini (ITA)
- Luca Marin (ITA)
- Joseph Davide Natullo (ITA)
- Marco Orsi (ITA)
- Robbie Renwick (GBR)
- Michael Rock (GBR)
- Fabio Scozzoli (ITA)
- Benjamin Starke (GER)
- Liam Tancock (GBR)
- Christopher Walker-Hebborn (GBR)

Women

- Rebecca Adlington (GBR)
- Ilaria Bianchi (ITA)
- Chiara Boggiatto (ITA)
- Jazmin Carlin (GBR)
- Caterina Giacchetti (ITA)
- Francesca Halsall (GBR)
- Caitlin McClatchey (GBR)
- Annika Mehlhorn (GER)
- Hannah Miley (GBR)
- Keri-Anne Payne (GBR)
- Caroline Ruhnau (GER)
- Daniela Samulski (GER)
- Ilaria Scarcella (ITA)
- Daniela Schreiber (GER)
- Francesca Segat (ITA)
- Elizabeth Simmonds (GBR)
- Gemma Spofforth (GBR)

=== United States ===
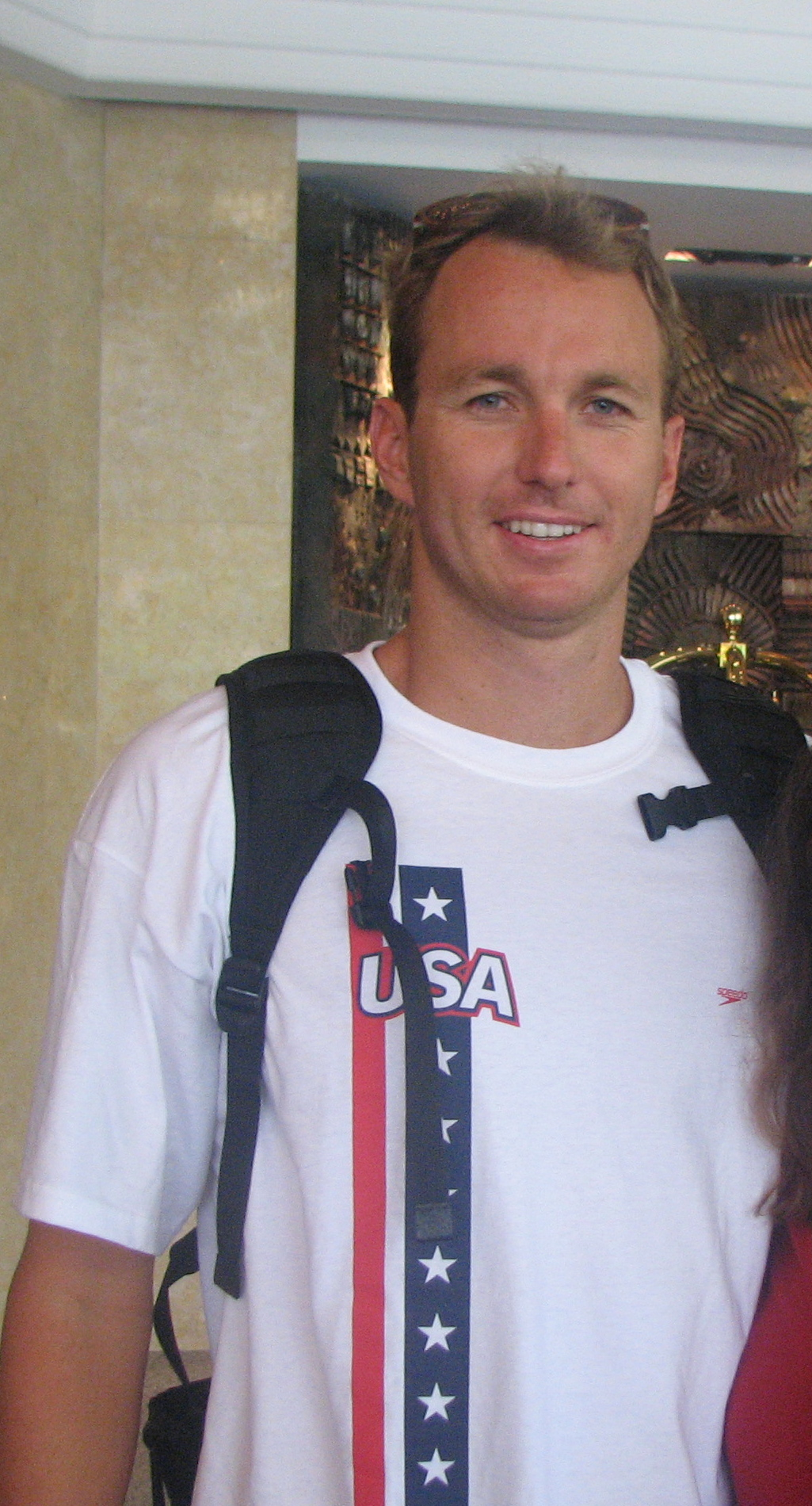
Aaron Peirsol

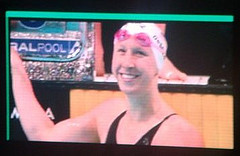
Mary Mohler

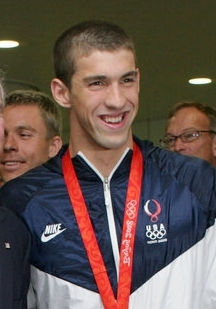
Michael Phelps

USA Swimming announced their team list on 28 October. Ryan Lochte pulled out of the team on 11 December due to injury.

Men

- Nathan Adrian
- Mike Alexandrov
- Jack Brown
- Tyler Clary
- Mark Gangloff
- Matt Grevers
- Michael Klueh
- Chad LaTourette
- Sean Mahoney
- Tyler McGill
- Aaron Peirsol
- Michael Phelps
- Kevin Swander
- Nick Thoman
- Alex Vanderkaay
- Peter Vanderkaay
- Garrett Weber-Gale

Women

- Elizabeth Beisel
- Missy Franklin
- Katy Freeman
- Jessica Hardy
- Margaret Hoelzer
- Katie Hoff
- Dagny Knutson
- Ariana Kukors
- Christine Magnuson
- Amber McDermott
- Hayley McGregory
- Mary Mohler
- Elizabeth Pelton
- Allison Schmitt
- Julia Smit
- Rebecca Soni
- Dana Vollmer
- Amanda Weir

== Format ==
The competition followed the format of previous Duel in the Pool events, and were held in a short course (25 m) pool. Up to three swimmers from each team competed in each of the twenty-six individual events – thirteen each for men and women. Points were awarded to the top 3 finishers in each individual event – five points for the gold medal finisher, three for silver and one for bronze. Swimmers in fourth to sixth position were awarded no points. The winning team in each of the relay events were awarded seven points, with none for the losing team. In the event of a tie, a mixed 4×50 m medley relay would have been held with a single decisive point to the winner.

Gold medallists in each event received a prize of 1,000 US Dollars, with world record swims receiving a bonus of 15,000 US Dollars.

Events were swum in the following order, with women followed by men in each event.

Day 1 (18 December)

- 400 m medley relay
- 400 m individual medley
- 100 m freestyle
- 200 m backstroke
- 200 m breaststroke
- 100 m butterfly
- 400 m freestyle

Day 2 (19 December)

- 800 m freestyle
- 200 m freestyle
- 100 m backstroke
- 100 m breaststroke
- 200 m butterfly
- 50 m freestyle
- 200 m individual medley
- 400 m freestyle relay

== Venue ==
Following Manchester's successful hosting of the 2008 FINA World Swimming Championships (25 m) at the Manchester Evening News Arena, the Manchester Aquatics Centre (which was the training and warm up venue for the 2008 championships) was chosen to host the 2009 Duel in the Pool. The venue was also that used for the aquatic sports at the 2002 Commonwealth Games.

The main pool was used for the 2009 Duel in the Pool – it was converted to the short course (25 m) format with temporary seating for 3000 positioned atop of the moveable floor sections of the diving pool and Oxford Road end of the main pool.

== Results ==
=== Final points tally ===
Rank	Team	Men	Women	Total
1	United States	95	90	185
2	E-Stars	41	37	78

=== Men ===
Event	Gold		Silver		Bronze	
50 m freestyle	Nathan Adrian; United States	20.71 (Note: On 24 July 2009, FINA (now World Aquatics) voted to ban high-technology swimwear from competition, effective 1 January 2010. However, USA Swimming enforced the policy from 1 October 2009 to align with the start of its subsequent competition season. Consequently, American swimmers wearing the suits during the period from 1 October to 31 December 2009 were eligible to break world records, as these were ratified by FINA, but not American records, which were ratified by USA Swimming. The official results do not reflect this distinction.)	Matt Grevers; United States	20.93	Marco Orsi (Italy) E-Stars	21.12
100 m freestyle	Nathan Adrian; United States	45.42	Marco Orsi (Italy) E-Stars	46.59	Michael Phelps; United States	46.99
200 m freestyle	Peter Vanderkaay; United States	1:42.17	Benjamin Starke (Germany) E-Stars	1:42.86	Michael Phelps; United States	1:43.08
400 m freestyle	Peter Vanderkaay; United States	3:35.54	Federico Colbertaldo (Italy) E-Stars	3:38.54	Michael Klueh; United States	3:39.94
800 m freestyle	Federico Colbertaldo (Italy) E-Stars	7:31.18; ER	Chad La Tourette; United States	7:33.94	David Davies (United Kingdom) E-Stars Michael Klueh; United States	7:36.47; NR 7:36.47
100 m backstroke	Matt Grevers; United States	49.32	Aaron Peirsol; United States	51.25	Liam Tancock (United Kingdom) E-Stars	51.40
200 m backstroke	Matt Grevers; United States	1:48.74	Nick Thoman; United States	1:50.05	Aaron Peirsol; United States	1:51.08
100 m breaststroke	Mike Alexandrov; United States	57.16	Fabio Scozzoli (Italy) E-Stars	57.47	Kevin Swander; United States	57.64
200 m breaststroke	Mike Alexandrov; United States	2:03.72	Edoardo Giorgetti (Italy) E-Stars	2:03.80; NR	Sean Mahoney; United States	2:04.28
100 m butterfly	Michael Phelps; United States	50.46	Benjamin Starke (Germany) E-Stars	50.51	Michael Rock (United Kingdom) E-Stars	50.61
200 m butterfly	Michael Rock (United Kingdom) E-Stars	1:51.46	Michael Phelps; United States	1:52.86	Tyler McGill; United States	1:53.17
200 m IM	James Goddard (United Kingdom) E-Stars	1:52.62; NR	Jack Brown; United States	1:54.43	Tyler Clary; United States	1:54.82
400 m IM	Tyler Clary; United States	4:02.02	Jack Brown; United States	4:03.57	Alex Vanderkaay; United States	4:05.22
4 × 100 m freestyle relay	(United States) United States; Nathan Adrian (45.08); Matt Grevers (44.68); Garrett Weber-Gale (47.43); Michael Phelps (46.11)	3:03.30; WR	E-Stars; Christian Galenda (46.67); Marco Orsi (45.95); Benjamin Starke (45.81); Filippo Magnini (46.52)	3:04.95	None awarded	
4 × 100 m medley relay	(United States) United States; Nick Thoman (48.94) WR; Mark Gangloff (57.03); Michael Phelps (49.93); Nathan Adrian (44.81)	3:20.71; WR	E-Stars; Liam Tancock (51.46); Fabio Scozzoli (57.75); Michael Rock (49.33); Christian Galenda (46.13)	3:24.67	None awarded	

Legend: WR – World record; ER – European record; NR – National record;

=== Women ===
Event	Gold		Silver		Bronze	
50 m freestyle	Fran Halsall (United Kingdom) E-Stars	23.44; NR	Jessica Hardy; United States	24.04	Christine Magnuson; United States	24.05
100 m freestyle	Fran Halsall (United Kingdom) E-Stars	51.54	Dana Vollmer; United States	52.16	Daniela Schreiber (Germany) E-Stars	52.73
200 m freestyle	Allison Schmitt; United States	1:51.67	Dagny Knutson; United States	1:53.59	Fran Halsall (United Kingdom) E-Stars	1:53.79; NR
400 m freestyle	Allison Schmitt; United States	3:55.89	Rebecca Adlington (United Kingdom) E-Stars	3:59.04	Dagny Knutson; United States	4:01.21
800 m freestyle	Rebecca Adlington (United Kingdom) E-Stars	8:10.59	Keri-anne Payne (United Kingdom) E-Stars	8:17.61	Amber McDermott; United States	8:21.82
100 m backstroke	Lizzie Simmonds (United Kingdom) E-Stars	56.59; NR	Margaret Hoelzer; United States	57.35	Gemma Spofforth (United Kingdom) E-Stars	57.62
200 m backstroke	Lizzie Simmonds (United Kingdom) E-Stars	2:00.91; ER	Margaret Hoelzer; United States	2:02.72	Elizabeth Pelton; United States	2:02.78
100 m breaststroke	Rebecca Soni; United States	1:02.70; WR	Jessica Hardy; United States	1:04.71	Katy Freeman; United States	1:05.13
200 m breaststroke	Rebecca Soni; United States	2:14.57; WR	Katy Freeman; United States	2:17.50	Ariana Kukors; United States	2:23.03
100 m butterfly	Fran Halsall (United Kingdom) E-Stars	55.71; NR	Christine Magnuson; United States	55.81	Dana Vollmer; United States	56.00
200 m butterfly	Mary Mohler; United States	2:04.78	Dana Vollmer; United States	2:05.34	Francesca Segat (Italy) E-Stars	2:05.53
200 m IM	Julia Smit; United States	2:04.60; WR	Ariana Kukors; United States	2:07.87	Katie Hoff; United States	2:08.37
400 m IM	Julia Smit; United States	4:21.04; WR	Dagny Knutson; United States	4:24.31	Hannah Miley (United Kingdom) E-Stars	4:24.51; ER
4 × 100 m freestyle relay	(United States) United States; Missy Franklin (52.78); Christine Magnuson (51.82); Amanda Weir (53.31); Dana Vollmer (50.98)	3:28.89	E-Stars; Fran Halsall (51.58); Daniela Schreiber (52.24); Daniela Samulski (52.34); Lizzie Simmonds (53.74)	3:29.90	None awarded	
4 × 100 m medley relay	(United States) United States; Margaret Hoelzer (57.47); Jessica Hardy (1:03.58); Dana Vollmer (54.37); Amanda Weir (52.55)	3:47.97; WR	E-Stars; Gemma Spofforth (57.17); Caroline Ruhnau (1:04.84); Ilaria Bianchi (57.72); ~~Daniela Samulski~~	DSQ	None awarded	

Legend: WR – World record; ER – European record; NR – National record;

== Broadcast ==
In the United Kingdom the event was broadcast live on the BBC's channels and via its website. Friday's session was on BBC Three, and Saturday's on BBC One.

NBC broadcast highlights of the event on 27 December in the United States.

== See also ==
- 2009 in swimming
