= British Swimming Championships (50 m) 2009 =

The British Gas Swimming Championships (50 m) 2009 were held at the Ponds Forge International Sports Centre, Sheffield from 16–20 March 2009. They also doubled as the first trials for the 2009 World Aquatics Championships. They were organised by British Swimming and sponsored by British Gas.

Qualification for the World Championships team was automatic for swimmers finishing in first place in all Olympic events. An additional space on the team was identified from the 2009 Scottish Championships, 25–28 June 2009 in Glasgow.

== Medal winners ==
=== Men's events ===
Event	Gold		Silver		Bronze	
50 m freestyle	Adam Brown	22.27	Charles Turner	22.66	Paul Robinson	22.72
100 m freestyle	Adam Brown	48.84	Liam Tancock	48.87	Ross Davenport	49.17
200 m freestyle	Ross Davenport	1:46.50	Andrew Hunter	1:47.14	David Davies	1:47.50
400 m freestyle	David Davies	3:45.24 NR	Lewis Smith	3:50.25	Christopher Alderton	3:50.36
1500 m freestyle	David Davies	14:52.41	Richard Charlesworth	15:07.50	Daniel Fogg	15:16.59
100 m backstroke	Liam Tancock	53.20 NR	Marco Loughran	54.51	Chris Walker-Hebborn	54.96
200 m backstroke	Chris Walker-Hebborn	1:57.95	James Goddard	1:58.34	Marco Loughran	1:58.58
100 m breaststroke	James Gibson	1:00.22	Kristopher Gilchrist	1:00.98	Darren Mew	1:01.42
200 m breaststroke	Kristopher Gilchrist	2:10.60	Richard Webb	2:10.75	Andrew Willis	2:12.69
100 m butterfly	Michael Rock	52.03 NR	Antony James	52.45	Ian Hulme	52.67
200 m butterfly	Michael Rock	1:55.68	Joseph Roebuck	1:57.67	Ian Powell	1:58.66
200 m individual medley	James Goddard	1:57.99	Lewis Smith	2:01.05	Michael Jamieson	2:01.48
400 m individual medley	Thomas Haffield	4:12.39 NR	Lewis Smith	4:14.06	James Goddard	4:16.05

Key: WR=World record; ER=European record; CR=Commonwealth record; NR=National record

=== Women's events ===
Event	Gold		Silver		Bronze	
50 m freestyle	Francesca Halsall	24.53 NR	Katherine Wyld	25.57	Amy Smith	25.59
100 m freestyle	Francesca Halsall	54.03	Caitlin McClatchey	55.06	Katherine Wyld	55.46
200 m freestyle	Joanne Jackson	1:56.47 CR	Caitlin McClatchey	1:57.58	Jazmin Carlin	1:58.85
400 m freestyle	Joanne Jackson	4:00.66 WR	Rebecca Adlington	4:00.89	Jazmin Carlin	4:06.19
800 m freestyle	Rebecca Adlington	8:18.86	Jazmin Carlin	8:30.12	Keri-Anne Payne	8:35.03
100 m backstroke	Elizabeth Simmonds	1:01.10	Georgia Davies	1:01.25	Rachel Lefley	1:02.67
200 m backstroke	Elizabeth Simmonds	2:10.48	Georgia Davies	2:10.96	Katherine Venters	2:12.40
100 m breaststroke	Kate Haywood	1:08.59	Lowri Tynan	1:10.21	Charlotte Barnes	1:10.73
200 m breaststroke	Hannah Miley	2:26.31	Charlotte Barnes	2:30.49	Stacey Tadd	2:30.73
100 m butterfly	Ellen Gandy	57.49 NR	Francesca Halsall	58.11	Jessica Sylvester	1:00.08
200 m butterfly	Ellen Gandy	2:04.83 ER, CR	Hannah Miley	2:08.24	Jessica Dickons	2:10.21
200 m individual medley	Hannah Miley	2:09.59 ER	Keri-Anne Payne	2:13.41	Sophie Allen	2:14.05
400 m individual medley	Hannah Miley	4:31.33 ER	Keri-Anne Payne	4:39.89	Aimee Willmott	4:43.33

Key: WR=World record; ER=European record; CR=Commonwealth record; NR=National record

== See also ==
- British Swimming
- List of British Swimming Championships champions
- List of British records in swimming
- 2009 in swimming
