= Skvortsov =

Skvortsov (Russian: Скворцов, from скворец meaning starling) is a Russian masculine surname, its feminine counterpart is Skvortsova.

== Geographical distribution ==
As of 2014, 89.8% of all known bearers of the surname Skvortsov were residents of Russia (frequency 1:3,590), 4.5% of Ukraine (1:22,597), 1.6% of Uzbekistan (1:43,002), 1.3% of Belarus (1:16,076) and 1.3% of Kazakhstan (1:30,873).

In Russia, the frequency of the surname was higher than national average (1:3,590) in the following subjects of the Russian Federation:

1. Ingushetia (1:197)
2. Kostroma Oblast (1:267)
3. Chuvashia (1:713)
4. Altai Krai (1:736)
5. Mari El (1:1,203)
6. Tambov Oblast (1:1,347)
7. Nizhny Novgorod Oblast (1:1,624)
8. Kalmykia (1:1,628)
9. Ivanovo Oblast (1:1,734)
10. Yaroslavl Oblast (1:2,141)
11. Ryazan Oblast (1:2,166)
12. Mordovia (1:2,188)
13. Vladimir Oblast (1:2,451)d
14. Moscow Oblast (1:2,976)
15. Oryol Oblast (1:3,102)
16. Tver Oblast (1:3,116)
17. Volgograd Oblast (1:3,152)
18. Lipetsk Oblast (1:3,156)
19. Penza Oblast (1:3,572)

== People ==
- Aleksandr Skvortsov (disambiguation), several people
- Alexey Skvortsov (1920–2008), Russian botanist and naturalist
- Anatoli Skvortsov (born 1976), Russian professional footballer
- Ivan Skvortsov-Stepanov (1870–1928), prominent Russian Bolshevik
- Nikolay Skvortsov (disambiguation), several people
- Ruslan Skvortsov (born 1980), Russian ballet dancer
- Valeriy Skvortsov (1945–2021), Soviet high jumper
- Victor Scvortov (born 1988), Moldavian judoplayer
- Veronika Skvortsova (born 1960), Russian neurologist and politician

== See also ==
- 1854 Skvortsov (1968 UE1), a main-belt asteroid named after Yevgeni Skvortsov (1882–1952)
