= 2009 in swimming =

2009 in swimming documents the highlights of competitive international swimming during 2009.

== Major events ==
=== World ===
- 5–11 July: Swimming at the 2009 Summer Universiade in Belgrade, Serbia
- 19–25 July: Open water swimming at the 2009 World Aquatics Championships in Rome, Italy
- 26 July – 2 August: Swimming at the 2009 World Aquatics Championships in Rome, Italy
- 2009 FINA Swimming World Cup:
  - 16–17 October: Durban, South Africa
  - 23–25 October: Rio de Janeiro, Brazil (cancelled)
  - 6–7 November: Moscow, Russia
  - 10–11 November: Stockholm, Sweden
  - 14–15 November: Berlin, Germany
  - 21–22 November: Singapore

=== Regional ===
- 27 June – 1 July: Swimming at the 2009 Mediterranean Games in Pescara, Italy
- 30 June – 5 July: Central American and Caribbean Swimming Championships in Barquisimeto, Venezuela
- 2–6 July: Swimming at the 2009 Asian Youth Games, Singapore
- 8–12 July: European Junior Swimming Championships in Prague, Czech Republic
- 30 October – 9 November: Swimming at the 2009 Asian Indoor Games in Hanoi, Vietnam
- 10–13 December: European Short Course Swimming Championships in Istanbul, Turkey
- 10–14 December: Swimming at the 2009 Southeast Asian Games in Vientiane, Laos

== Suit ban ==
147 world records were set during 2009, 42 of those coming at the world championships. This was linked to the Speedo LZR, a suit released in 2008 that covered the shoulders to ankles and featured polyurethane panels, and suits from Jaked and Arena in 2009, which expanded on the LZR's design by covering the entire suits in polyurethane.

The FINA Congress was held in Rome on 24 July 2009, during the world championships, and voted almost unanimously to ban all body-length swimsuits. Men's swimsuits may maximally cover the area from the waist to the knee, and women's counterparts from the shoulder to the knee. They also ruled that the fabric used must be a "textile", that is, consisting natural or synthetic yarns woven together. With the exception of drawstrings on male jammers, suits must not have any fastening devices such as a zipper. The new regulations took effect on 1 January 2010.

== World records ==
147 world records were reported during 2009, however some were unratified by FINA.

Ratified, current as of 1 January 2010
Ratified, but officially surpassed later in 2009
Unratified

=== Men's long course ===
Date	Event	Time		Name	Nation	Meet	Location	Ref
5 April	50 m butterfly	22.43	sf	Rafael Muñoz	Spain	Spanish Championships	Málaga, Spain	
18 April	50 m breaststroke	27.06	sf	Cameron van der Burgh	South Africa	South African Championships	Durban, South Africa	
23 April	100 m freestyle	~~46.94~~	sf	Alain Bernard	France	French Championships	Montpellier, France	
26 April	50 m freestyle	20.94		Frédérick Bousquet	France	French Championships	Montpellier, France	
8 May	50 m breaststroke	26.89	h	Felipe França Silva	Brazil	Maria Lenk Trophy	Rio de Janeiro, Brazil	
10 May	200 m backstroke	~~1:52.86~~		Ryosuke Irie	Japan	Duel in the Pool	Canberra, Australia	
13 June	100 m breaststroke	~~58.67~~	tt	Igor Borysik	Ukraine	Ukraine National Cup	Kharkiv, Ukraine	
1 July	100 m backstroke	52.38	r	Aschwin Wildeboer	Spain	Mediterranean Games	Pescara, Italy	
8 July	100 m backstroke	51.94		Aaron Peirsol	United States	US Championships	Indianapolis, United States	
9 July	100 m butterfly	50.22		Michael Phelps	United States	US Championships	Indianapolis, United States	
11 July	200 m backstroke	1:53.08		Aaron Peirsol	United States	US Championships	Indianapolis, United States	
26 July	400 m freestyle	3:40.07		Paul Biedermann	Germany	World Championships	Rome, Italy	
27 July	100 m breaststroke	58.58		Brenton Rickard	Australia	World Championships	Rome, Italy	
28 July	200 m freestyle	1:42.00		Paul Biedermann	Germany	World Championships	Rome, Italy	
28 July	50 m breaststroke	26.74		Cameron van der Burgh	South Africa	World Championships	Rome, Italy	
29 July	200 m butterfly	1:51.51		Michael Phelps	United States	World Championships	Rome, Italy	
29 July	50 m breaststroke	26.67		Cameron van der Burgh	South Africa	World Championships	Rome, Italy	
29 July	800 m freestyle	7:32.12		Zhang Lin	China	World Championships	Rome, Italy	
30 July	200 m individual medley	1:54.10		Ryan Lochte	United States	World Championships	Rome, Italy	
30 July	100 m freestyle	46.91		César Cielo Filho	Brazil	World Championships	Rome, Italy	
30 July	200 m breaststroke	2:07.31	sf	Christian Sprenger	Australia	World Championships	Rome, Italy	
31 July	200 m backstroke	1:51.92		Aaron Peirsol	United States	World Championships	Rome, Italy	
31 July	100 m butterfly	50.01	sf	Milorad Čavić	Serbia	World Championships	Rome, Italy	
31 July	4 × 200 m freestyle relay	6:58.55		Michael Phelps (1:44.49); Ricky Berens (1:44.13); David Walters (1:45.47); Ryan Lochte (1:44.46)	United States	World Championships	Rome, Italy	
1 August	100 m butterfly	49.82		Michael Phelps	United States	World Championships	Rome, Italy	
1 August	50 m backstroke	24.08	sf	Liam Tancock	Great Britain	World Championships	Rome, Italy	
2 August	50 m backstroke	24.04		Liam Tancock	Great Britain	World Championships	Rome, Italy	
2 August	4 × 100 m medley relay	3:27.28		Aaron Peirsol (52.19); Eric Shanteau (58.57); Michael Phelps (49.72); David Walters (46.80)	United States	World Championships	Rome, Italy	
18 December	50 m freestyle	20.91		César Cielo Filho	Brazil	Brazilian Championships	São Paulo, Brazil	

Legend: e – equalled existing record;
Records not set in finals: h – heat; sf – semifinal; r – relay 1st leg; rh – relay heat 1st leg; b – B final; † – en route to final mark; so – swim-off; tt – time trial

=== Women's long course ===
Date	Event	Time		Name	Nation	Meet	Location	Ref
8 March	200 m freestyle	1:54.47		Federica Pellegrini	Italy	Italian Championships	Riccione, Italy	
16 March	400 m freestyle	4:00.66		Joanne Jackson	Great Britain	British Championships	Sheffield, United Kingdom	
9 April	50 m backstroke	27.67	=	Zhao Jing	China	Chinese Championships	Shaoxing, China	
19 April	50 m butterfly	25.33		Marleen Veldhuis	Netherlands	Amsterdam Swim Cup	Amsterdam, Netherlands	
19 April	50 m freestyle	23.96		Marleen Veldhuis	Netherlands	Amsterdam Swim Cup	Amsterdam, Netherlands	
28 April	50 m backstroke	~~27.48~~	h	Anastasia Zuyeva	Russia	Russian Championships	Moscow, Russia	
28 April	50 m breaststroke	~~30.23~~	sf	Yuliya Yefimova	Russia	Russian Championships	Moscow, Russia	
28 April	50 m breaststroke	~~30.05~~		Yuliya Yefimova	Russia	Russian Championships	Moscow, Russia	
28 April	50 m backstroke	~~27.47~~		Anastasia Zuyeva	Russia	Russian Championships	Moscow, Russia	
25 June	100 m freestyle	52.85	h	Britta Steffen	Germany	German Championships	Berlin, Germany	
26 June	50 m backstroke	27.61		Daniela Samulski	Germany	German Championships	Berlin, Germany	
27 June	100 m freestyle	52.56		Britta Steffen	Germany	German Championships	Berlin, Germany	
27 June	400 m freestyle	4:00.41		Federica Pellegrini	Italy	Mediterranean Games	Pescara, Italy	
8 July	50 m breaststroke	30.23		Amanda Reason	Canada	Canada World Championship Trials	Montreal, Canada	
26 July	100 m butterfly	56.44	sf	Sarah Sjöström	Sweden	World Championships	Rome, Italy	
26 July	200 m individual medley	2:07.03	sf	Ariana Kukors	United States	World Championships	Rome, Italy	
26 July	400 m freestyle	3:59.15		Federica Pellegrini	Italy	World Championships	Rome, Italy	
26 July	100 m freestyle	52.22	r	Britta Steffen	Germany	World Championships	Rome, Italy	
26 July	4 × 100 m freestyle relay	3:31.72		Inge Dekker (53.61); Ranomi Kromowidjojo (52.30); Femke Heemskerk (53.03); Marleen Veldhuis (52.78)	Netherlands	World Championships	Rome, Italy	
27 July	100 m butterfly	56.06		Sarah Sjöström	Sweden	World Championships	Rome, Italy	
27 July	100 m breaststroke	1:04.84	sf	Rebecca Soni	United States	World Championships	Rome, Italy	
27 July	100 m backstroke	58.48	sf	Anastasia Zuyeva	Russia	World Championships	Rome, Italy	
27 July	200 m individual medley	2:06.15		Ariana Kukors	United States	World Championships	Rome, Italy	
28 July	100 m backstroke	58.12		Gemma Spofforth	Great Britain	World Championships	Rome, Italy	
28 July	200 m freestyle	1:53.67	sf	Federica Pellegrini	Italy	World Championships	Rome, Italy	
29 July	200 m butterfly	2:04.14	h	Mary DeScenza	United States	World Championships	Rome, Italy	
29 July	50 m backstroke	27.39	sf	Daniela Samulski	Germany	World Championships	Rome, Italy	
29 July	50 m backstroke	27.38	sf	Anastasia Zuyeva	Russia	World Championships	Rome, Italy	
29 July	200 m freestyle	1:52.98		Federica Pellegrini	Italy	World Championships	Rome, Italy	
30 July	200 m breaststroke	2:20.12	sf	Annamay Pierse	Canada	World Championships	Rome, Italy	
30 July	200 m butterfly	2:03.41		Jessicah Schipper	Australia	World Championships	Rome, Italy	
30 July	50 m backstroke	27.06		Zhao Jing	China	World Championships	Rome, Italy	
30 July	4 × 200 m freestyle relay	7:42.08		Yang Yu (1:55.47); Zhu Qianwei (1:55.79); Liu Jing (1:56.09); Pang Jiaying (1:54.73)	China	World Championships	Rome, Italy	
31 July	100 m freestyle	52.07		Britta Steffen	Germany	World Championships	Rome, Italy	
31 July	50 m butterfly	25.28	sf	Marleen Veldhuis	Netherlands	World Championships	Rome, Italy	
31 July	50 m butterfly	25.07	sf	Therese Alshammar	Sweden	World Championships	Rome, Italy	
1 August	200 m backstroke	2:04.81		Kirsty Coventry	Zimbabwe	World Championships	Rome, Italy	
1 August	4 × 100 m medley relay	3:52.19		Zhao Jing (58.98); Chen Huijia (1:04.12); Jiao Liuyang (56.28); Li Zhesi (52.81)	China	World Championships	Rome, Italy	
2 August	50 m breaststroke	30.09		Yuliya Yefimova	Russia	World Championships	Rome, Italy	
2 August	50 m freestyle	23.73		Britta Steffen	Germany	World Championships	Rome, Italy	
6 August	50 m breaststroke	29.95	tt, †	Jessica Hardy	United States	US Open	Federal Way, United States	
7 August	50 m breaststroke	29.80	†	Jessica Hardy	United States	US Open	Federal Way, United States	
7 August	100 m breaststroke	1:04.45		Jessica Hardy	United States	US Open	Federal Way, United States	
21 October	200 m butterfly	2:01.81		Liu Zige	China	Chinese National Games	Jinan, China	

Legend: e – equalled existing record;
Records not set in finals: h – heat; sf – semifinal; r – relay 1st leg; rh – relay heat 1st leg; b – B final; † – en route to final mark; so – swim-off; tt – time trial

=== Men's short course ===
Date	Event	Time		Name	Nation	Meet	Location	Ref
15 February	200 m butterfly	1:50.53		Nikolay Skvortsov	Russia	Russian SC Championships	Saint Petersburg, Russia	
7 August	4 × 200 m freestyle relay	6:51.05		Colin Russell (1:43.60); Stefan Hirniak (1:43.41); Brent Hayden (1:41.49); Joel Greenshields (1:42.55)	Canada	British SC Grand Prix	Leeds, United Kingdom	
8 August	50 m breaststroke	25.43		Cameron van der Burgh	South Africa	South Africa SC Championships	Pietermaritzburg, South Africa	
8 August	100 m breaststroke	56.39	sf	Cameron van der Burgh	South Africa	South Africa SC Championships	Pietermaritzburg, South Africa	
8 August	50 m freestyle	20.30	h	Roland Schoeman	South Africa	South Africa SC Championships	Pietermaritzburg, South Africa	
9 August	100 m breaststroke	55.99		Cameron van der Burgh	South Africa	South Africa SC Championships	Pietermaritzburg, South Africa	
9 August	4 × 100 m medley relay	3:23.33		Jake Tapp (50.60); Paul Kornfeld (57.18); Joe Bartoch (50.18); Brent Hayden (45.37)	Canada	British SC Grand Prix	Leeds, United Kingdom	
10 August	200 m breaststroke	2:01.98		Christian Sprenger	Australia	Australian SC Championships	Hobart, Australia	
17 October	50 m backstroke	22.75		Peter Marshall	United States	World Cup	Durban, South Africa	
24 October	50 m butterfly	22.06		Stefan Deibler	Germany	International Swimming Festival	Aachen, Germany	
7 November	100 m butterfly	48.99		Yevgeny Korotyshkin	Russia	World Cup	Moscow, Russia	
7 November	200 m backstroke	1:47.08		George Du Rand	South Africa	World Cup	Moscow, Russia	
10 November	200 m butterfly	1:49.11		Kaio de Almeida	Brazil	World Cup	Stockholm, Sweden	
11 November	50 m backstroke	22.73		Peter Marshall	United States	World Cup	Stockholm, Sweden	
14 November	100 m individual medley	50.95	h	Sergey Fesikov	Russia	World Cup	Berlin, Germany	
14 November	50 m breaststroke	25.25		Cameron van der Burgh	South Africa	World Cup	Berlin, Germany	
14 November	400 m freestyle	3:32.77		Paul Biedermann	Germany	World Cup	Berlin, Germany	
14 November	50 m butterfly	21.80		Steffen Deibler	Germany	World Cup	Berlin, Germany	
15 November	200 m freestyle	1:39.37		Paul Biedermann	Germany	World Cup	Berlin, Germany	
15 November	100 m breaststroke	55.61		Cameron van der Burgh	South Africa	World Cup	Berlin, Germany	
15 November	100 m butterfly	48.48		Yevgeny Korotyshkin	Russia	World Cup	Berlin, Germany	
15 November	200 m individual medley	1:51.55		Darian Townsend	South Africa	World Cup	Berlin, Germany	
15 November	200 m backstroke	1:46.11		Arkady Vyatchanin	Russia	World Cup	Berlin, Germany	
22 November	50 m backstroke	22.61		Peter Marshall	United States	World Cup	Singapore	
11 December	400 m individual medley	3:57.27		László Cseh	Hungary	European SC Championships	Istanbul, Turkey	
12 December	100 m individual medley	50.76	sf	Peter Mankoč	Slovenia	European SC Championships	Istanbul, Turkey	
12 December	100 m backstroke	49.17	sf	Arkady Vyatchanin	Russia	European SC Championships	Istanbul, Turkey	
13 December	200 m breaststroke	2:00.67		Dániel Gyurta	Hungary	European SC Championships	Istanbul, Turkey	
13 December	100 m backstroke	48.97	=	Stanislav Donets	Russia	European SC Championships	Istanbul, Turkey	
13 December	100 m backstroke	48.97	=	Arkady Vyatchanin	Russia	European SC Championships	Istanbul, Turkey	
18 December	100 m backstroke	48.94	r	Nick Thoman	United States	Duel in the Pool	Manchester, United Kingdom	
18 December	4 × 100 m medley relay	3:20.71		Nick Thoman (48.94); Mark Gangloff (57.03); Michael Phelps (49.93); Nathan Adrian (44.81)	United States	Duel in the Pool	Manchester, United Kingdom	
19 December	4 × 100 m freestyle relay	3:03.30		Nathan Adrian (45.08); Matt Grevers (44.68); Garrett Weber-Gale (47.43); Michael Phelps (46.11)	United States	Duel in the Pool	Manchester, United Kingdom	
20 December	4 × 100 m medley relay	3:19.16		Stanislav Donets (49.63); Sergey Geybel (56.43); Yevgeny Korotyshkin (48.35); Danila Izotov (44.75)	Russia	Salnikov Cup	Saint Petersburg, Russia	

Legend: e – equalled existing record;
Records not set in finals: h – heat; sf – semifinal; r – relay 1st leg; rh – relay heat 1st leg; b – B final; † – en route to final mark; so – swim-off; tt – time trial

=== Women's short course ===
Date	Event	Time		Name	Nation	Meet	Location	Ref
22 February	100 m backstroke	56.15		Shiho Sakai	Japan	Japan Open	Tokyo, Japan	
14 March	200 m breaststroke	2:17.50		Annamay Pierse	Canada	Canada Spring Nationals	Toronto, Canada	
7 August	200 m breaststroke	2:16.83		Annamay Pierse	Canada	British SC Grand Prix	Leeds, United Kingdom	
8 August	400 m freestyle	3:54.92		Joanne Jackson	Great Britain	British SC Grand Prix	Leeds, United Kingdom	
9 August	4 × 100 m medley relay	3:49.45		Katie Murdoch; Annamay Pierse; Audrey Lacroix; Victoria Poon	Canada	British SC Grand Prix	Leeds, United Kingdom	
10 August	100 m freestyle	51.01		Libby Trickett	Australia	Australian SC Championships	Hobart, Australia	
10 August	100 m individual medley	58.54		Emily Seebohm	Australia	Australian SC Championships	Hobart, Australia	
12 August	100 m butterfly	55.68		Jessicah Schipper	Australia	Australian SC Championships	Hobart, Australia	
17 October	100 m individual medley	58.51	h	Therese Alshammar	Sweden	World Cup	Durban, South Africa	
17 October	50 m breaststroke	29.45		Jessica Hardy	United States	World Cup	Durban, South Africa	
17 October	50 m butterfly	24.75		Therese Alshammar	Sweden	World Cup	Durban, South Africa	
6 November	50 m backstroke	26.17		Marieke Guehrer	Australia	World Cup	Moscow, Russia	
6 November	200 m individual medley	2:06.01		Evelyn Verrasztó	Hungary	World Cup	Moscow, Russia	
7 November	50 m breaststroke	29.36		Jessica Hardy	United States	World Cup	Moscow, Russia	
10 November	50 m backstroke	26.08	h	Zhao Jing	China	World Cup	Stockholm, Sweden	
10 November	100 m butterfly	55.46		Felicity Galvez	Australia	World Cup	Stockholm, Sweden	
10 November	50 m backstroke	25.84		Zhao Jing	China	World Cup	Stockholm, Sweden	
11 November	50 m breaststroke	28.96	h	Jessica Hardy	United States	World Cup	Stockholm, Sweden	
11 November	200 m butterfly	2:02.50		Liu Zige	China	World Cup	Stockholm, Sweden	
11 November	100 m individual medley	58.40		Zhao Jing	China	World Cup	Stockholm, Sweden	
11 November	50 m butterfly	24.46		Therese Alshammar	Sweden	World Cup	Stockholm, Sweden	
14 November	100 m breaststroke	1:03.00		Leisel Jones	Australia	World Cup	Berlin, Germany	
14 November	200 m backstroke	2:00.18		Shiho Sakai	Japan	World Cup	Berlin, Germany	
15 November	50 m breaststroke	28.80		Jessica Hardy	United States	World Cup	Berlin, Germany	
15 November	100 m backstroke	55.23		Shiho Sakai	Japan	World Cup	Berlin, Germany	
15 November	200 m butterfly	2:00.78		Liu Zige	China	World Cup	Berlin, Germany	
15 November	200 m breaststroke	2:15.42		Leisel Jones	Australia	World Cup	Berlin, Germany	
15 November	100 m individual medley	57.74		Hinkelien Schreuder	Netherlands	World Cup	Berlin, Germany	
22 November	400 m individual medley	4:22.88		Kathryn Meaklim	South Africa	World Cup	Singapore	
22 November	50 m butterfly	24.38		Therese Alshammar	Sweden	World Cup	Singapore	
28 November	1500 m freestyle	15:28.65		Lotte Friis	Denmark	Danish Club Championships	Birkerød, Denmark	
10 December	200 m individual medley	2:04.62		Evelyn Verrasztó	Hungary	European SC Championships	Istanbul, Turkey	
12 December	100 m butterfly	55.05	sf	Diane Bui Duyet	France	European SC Championships	Istanbul, Turkey	
12 December	50 m backstroke	25.70		Sanja Jovanović	Russia	European SC Championships	Istanbul, Turkey	
13 December	200 m freestyle	1:51.17		Federica Pellegrini	Italy	European SC Championships	Istanbul, Turkey	
18 December	4 × 100 m medley relay	3:47.97		Margaret Hoelzer (57.47); Jessica Hardy (1:03.58); Dana Vollmer (54.37); Amanda Weir (52.55)	United States	Duel in the Pool	Manchester, United Kingdom	
18 December	400 m individual medley	4:21.04		Julia Smit	United States	Duel in the Pool	Manchester, United Kingdom	
18 December	200 m breaststroke	2:14.57		Rebecca Soni	United States	Duel in the Pool	Manchester, United Kingdom	
19 December	100 m breaststroke	1:02.70		Rebecca Soni	United States	Duel in the Pool	Manchester, United Kingdom	
19 December	200 m individual medley	2:04.60		Julia Smit	United States	Duel in the Pool	Manchester, United Kingdom	

Legend: e – equalled existing record;
Records not set in finals: h – heat; sf – semifinal; r – relay 1st leg; rh – relay heat 1st leg; b – B final; † – en route to final mark; so – swim-off; tt – time trial

== Other events ==
=== National championships ===
Long course

Dates	Event	City
26 February – 1 March	(Austria) Austrian Championships	Vienna
4–8 March	(Italy) Italian Championships	Riccione
16–20 March	(United Kingdom) British Championships	Sheffield
17–22 March	(Australia) Australian Championships	Sydney
19–22 March	(Switzerland) Swiss Championships	Zürich
19–22 March	(Iceland) Icelandic Championships	Reykjavík
24–27 March	(Ukraine) Ukrainian Championships	Kharkiv
1–5 April	New Zealand Championships	Christchurch
2–5 April	(Spain) Spanish Championships	Málaga
6–12 April	(China) Chinese Championships	Shaoxing
7–12 April	(Denmark) Danish Championships	Esbjerg
14–19 April	(South Africa) South African Championships	Durban
16–19 April	(Republic of Ireland) Irish Championships	Dublin
16–19 April	(Japan) Japanese Championships	Hamamatsu
22–26 April	(France) French Championships	Montpellier
26–30 April	(Russia) Russian Championships	Moscow
1–3 May	(Belgium) Belgian Championships	Antwerp
12–14 June	(Netherlands) Dutch Championships	Eindhoven
12–14 June	(Serbia) Serbian Championships	Belgrade
25–28 June	(Finland) Finnish Championships	Helsinki
24–28 June	(Germany) German Championships	Berlin
7–11 July	(United States) USA Championships	Indianapolis
8–11 July	(Canada) Canadian Championships	Montreal
9–12 July	(Bulgaria) Bulgarian Championships	Sofia
18–21 July	(Portugal) Portuguese Championships	Loulé
4–8 August	(Israel) Israeli Championships	Netanya
6–9 August	(Slovenia) Slovenian Championships	Radovljica
7–9 August	(Greece) Greek Championships	Athens

Short course

Dates	Event	City
29 January – 1 February	(Finland) Finnish SC Championships	Oulu
7–10 August	(South Africa) South African SC Championships	Pietermaritzburg
8–12 August	(Australia) Australian SC Championships	Hobart
3–5 December	(United States) USA SC Championships	Federal Way, WA

=== Other major meets ===
- 19–21 March: NCAA Women's Swimming and Diving Championships Division 1 Finals in College Station, TX, USA
- 26–28 March: NCAA Men's Swimming and Diving Championships Division 1 Finals in College Station, TX, USA
- 9–10 May: Australia v Japan Duel in the Pool in Canberra, Australia
- Mare Nostrum 2009:
  - 6–7 June: Gran Premi Internacional Ciutat de Barcelona in Barcelona, Spain
  - 9–10 June: Meeting Arena de Canet en Roussillon in Canet, France
  - 13–14 June: Meeting International de Natation de Monte-Carlo in Monte Carlo, Monaco
- 19–23 July: Swimming at the 2009 Maccabiah Games, Netanya, Israel
- 4–8 August: US Open in Federal Way, WA, USA
- 6–9 August: British Short Course Grand Prix in Leeds, United Kingdom
- 18–19 December: European Select v United States Duel in the Pool in Manchester, United Kingdom

=== Paralympic swimming ===
- 15–19 August: Swimming at the 2009 ASEAN Para Games in Kuala Lumpur, Malaysia
- 18–24 October: 2009 IPC Swimming European Championships in Reykjavík, Iceland
- 29 November – 5 December: 2009 IPC Swimming World Championships (25 m) in Rio de Janeiro, Brazil
