= Aleksandr Skvortsov =

Aleksandr Skvortsov may refer to:

- Aleksandr Skvortsov (cosmonaut) (born 1966), Russian cosmonaut
- Alexander Skvortsov (ice hockey) (1954–2020), Soviet ice hockey player
- Aleksandr Skvortsov (footballer) (born 1982), Russian footballer
