= Aleksandr Skvortsov (footballer) =

Russian footballer

Personal information
- Full name: Aleksandr Vladimirovich Skvortsov
- Date of birth: 6 March 1982 (age 44)
- Height: 1.77 m (5 ft 9 1/2 in)
- Position: Midfielder

Senior career*
Years	Team	Apps	(Gls)
2001	BSV Blau Weiß 22 Lengenfeld unterm Stein	3	(1)
2001–2003	FC Obninsk (amateur)		
2004–2005	FC Lokomotiv-M Serpukhov	63	(9)
2006–2008	FC Zvezda Irkutsk	101	(3)
2009	FC Volgar-Gazprom-2 Astrakhan	31	(0)
2010–2011	FC Gazovik Orenburg	47	(1)
2012–2013	FC Tyumen	20	(0)
2013–2014	FC Kaluga	25	(0)
2015–2017	FC Kaluga	47	(0)
2018	FC Vityaz Podolsk (amateur)		
- * Club domestic league appearances and goals

Aleksandr Vladimirovich Skvortsov (Russian: Александр Владимирович Скворцов; born 6 March 1982) is a former Russian professional football player.

== Club career ==
He played 4 seasons in the Russian Football National League for FC Zvezda Irkutsk, FC Volgar-Gazprom-2 Astrakhan and FC Gazovik Orenburg.
