= James Kirton (swimmer) =

British former competitive swimmer (born 1985)

Personal information
- Full name: James Alexander Kirton
- National team: Great Britain
- Born: 10 April 1985 (age 41) Barnsley, England
- Height: 1.88 m (6 ft 2 in)
- Weight: 77 lb (35 kg; 5.5 st)

Sport
- Sport: Swimming
- Strokes: Breaststroke
- Club: City of Sheffield

James Alexander Kirton (born 10 April 1985) is a British former competitive swimmer who specialised in breaststroke events.

Kirton represented Great Britain at the 2008 Summer Olympics in the 200-metre breaststroke swimming event.
