= Nikolay Skvortsov =

Nikolay Skvortsov may refer to:

- Nikolay Skvortsov (swimmer), Russian swimmer
- Nikolay Skvortsov (politician), First Secretary of the Communist Party of the Kazakh SSR
