= James Goddard =

British swimmer (born 1983)

Personal information
- Full name: James Francis Goddard
- Nicknames: "Jimmy", "Offside"
- National team: Great Britain
- Born: 30 March 1983 (age 43) Victoria, Seychelles
- Height: 1.83 m (6 ft 0 in)
- Weight: 82 kg (181 lb; 12.9 st)

Sport
- Sport: Swimming
- Strokes: Backstroke, medley
- Club: Stockport Metro
Medal record
Men's swimming
Representing Great Britain
World Championships (SC)
| Bronze medal – third place | 2008 Manchester | 200 m medley |
European Championships (LC)
| Silver medal – second place | 2012 Debrecen | 200 m medley |
European Championships (SC)
| Gold medal – first place | 2008 Rijeka | 200 m medley |
| Bronze medal – third place | 2008 Rijeka | 100 m medley |
Representing England
Commonwealth Games
| Gold medal – first place | 2002 Manchester | 200 m backstroke |
| Gold medal – first place | 2010 Delhi | 200 m backstroke |
| Gold medal – first place | 2010 Delhi | 200 m medley |
| Bronze medal – third place | 2002 Manchester | 200 m medley |

James Francis Goddard (born 30 March 1983) is a Seychelles-born British competitive swimmer and backstroker who represented Great Britain in the Olympics, FINA world championships and European championships, and swam for England in the Commonwealth Games.

== Personal life ==
Goddard was born in the Seychelles and lived in Beau Vallon, but moved to Stockport, England, during his youth, and attended Werneth School, and trains in Stockport with other swimmers such as Keri-Anne Payne and Michael Rock. James Goddard is an Olympic swimmer in backstroke and medley

== Career ==
Goddard represented Great Britain at the 2004 Summer Olympics in Athens, where he finished 4th in the 200m backstroke. Goddard also represented Great Britain at the 2008 Summer Olympics in the 200 m individual medley swimming events. At the 2012 Summer Olympics, he only competed in the men's 200 m individual medley, finishing in 7th.

Goddard represented England in the 2002 Commonwealth Games, where he won a gold in the men's 200 m backstroke and a bronze in the men's 200m individual medley, at the 2006 Commonwealth Games, and at the 2010 Commonwealth Games, where he again won a gold in the men's 200m backstroke and this time gold in the men's 200m individual medley.

== Personal bests and records held ==
| Event | Long course | Short course |
|---|---|---|
| 100 m backstroke | 54.90 | 52.87 |
| 200 m backstroke | 1:55.58 ^{CR} | 1:53.43 |
| 100 m individual medley | | 52.05 |
| 200 m individual medley | 1:57.12 ^{NR} | 1:52.57 |
| 400 m individual medley | 4:16.05 | 4:15.87 |
Key CR:Commonwealth NR:British

== See also ==
- List of Commonwealth Games medallists in swimming (men)
