= Liam Tancock =

English swimmer (born 1985)

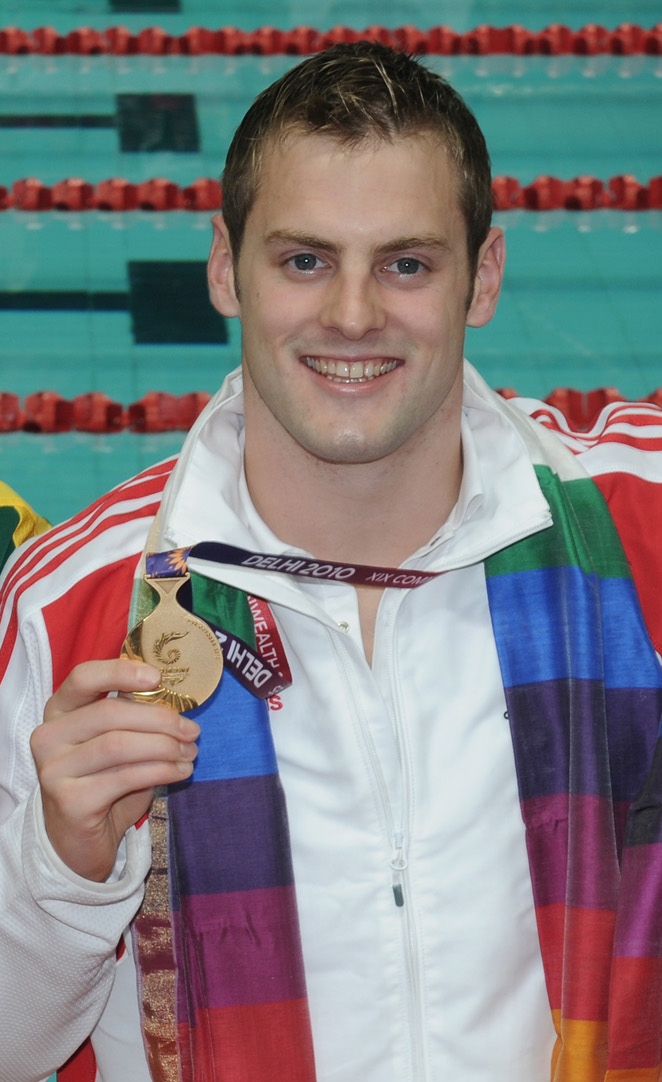
- XIX Commonwealth Games-2010

Personal information
- Full name: Liam John Tancock
- Nickname: "The Tank"
- National team: Great Britain
- Born: 7 May 1985 (age 41) Exeter, England
- Height: 1.83 m (6 ft 0 in)
- Weight: 81 kg (179 lb; 12.8 st)

Sport
- Sport: Swimming
- Strokes: Backstroke, medley
- College team: Loughborough University
- Coach: James Gibson
Medal record
Men's swimming
Representing Great Britain
World Championships (LC)
Gold medal – first place	2009 Rome	50 m backstroke
Gold medal – first place	2011 Shanghai	50 m backstroke
Bronze medal – third place	2005 Montreal	50 m backstroke
Bronze medal – third place	2007 Melbourne	50 m backstroke
Bronze medal – third place	2007 Melbourne	100 m backstroke
World Championships (SC)
Gold medal – first place	2008 Manchester	100 m backstroke
Silver medal – second place	2008 Manchester	50 m backstroke
Silver medal – second place	2008 Manchester	200 m medley
Bronze medal – third place	2008 Manchester	100 m medley
European Championships (LC)
Silver medal – second place	2010 Budapest	50 m backstroke
Bronze medal – third place	2006 Budapest	4×100 m medley
Bronze medal – third place	2010 Budapest	100 m backstroke
European Championships (SC)
Bronze medal – third place	2005 Trieste	50 m backstroke
Bronze medal – third place	2005 Trieste	4×50 m medley
Bronze medal – third place	2005 Trieste	4×50 m freestyle
Summer Universiade
Gold medal – first place	2005 Izmir	50 m backstroke
Representing England
Commonwealth Games
Gold medal – first place	2006 Melbourne	100 m backstroke
Gold medal – first place	2010 Delhi	50 m backstroke
Gold medal – first place	2010 Delhi	100 m backstroke
Gold medal – first place	2014 Glasgow	4×100 m medley
Silver medal – second place	2006 Melbourne	50 m backstroke
Silver medal – second place	2006 Melbourne	4×100 m medley
Silver medal – second place	2010 Delhi	4×100 m freestyle
Bronze medal – third place	2010 Delhi	4×100 m medley
Bronze medal – third place	2014 Glasgow	50 m backstroke
Bronze medal – third place	2014 Glasgow	100 m backstroke

Liam John Tancock (born 7 May 1985) is an English former competitive swimmer who represented Great Britain in the Olympics, FINA world championships, and European championships, and England in the Commonwealth Games. He specialised in backstroke and individual medley events. He is a three-time world champion and a four-time Commonwealth Games gold medallist, and held the world record in the 50-metre backstroke (long course) for almost a decade.

== Early life ==
Born on 7 May 1985, his first experience of swimming was waiting poolside while his older brother was learning to swim at a swimming school. Tancock was competing in local swimming competitions by the age of nine. Tancock played for Exeter Chiefs rugby team as a winger until he was thirteen. His coach, Jon Randall, convinced him to choose swimming over rugby. He attended Loughborough College where he studied sports science and was awarded with a degree validated by Loughborough University.

== Swimming career ==
=== 2000–2007: Pre-olympic career ===
As a junior for the Exeter Swimming Club, he competed at the British Winter Championship in 2000 at the age of 15. He broke four records and won more medals than any junior under the age of 16 had before him. He followed this with a gold medal at the 2001 Youth Olympic Games, and won two golds in 2002 at the World Schools Championships. He competed at a senior level for the first time in 2005 at the 2005 World Aquatic Championships, where he took the bronze medal in the 50m backstroke.

At the Japan International Open in August 2007, he won two gold medals. The first was in the 100m backstroke, which broke the European record time, and his second was in the 200m individual medley with a time of 1:59.19, which was only the second time he had finished with a time of under two minutes. It was a new British record, beating the previous record by a second and a half.

Tancock won several medals at the 2008 World Short Course Championships in Manchester, including a British, European and Commonwealth record time of 50:14 to take the gold medal in the 100m backstroke. The time was only 0.14 seconds off the world record set by American Ryan Lochte. He also won silver in the 50m backstroke and 200m medley.

=== 2008–2012: Olympic career ===
Competing at the 2008 Summer Olympics in Beijing in the men's 100m backstroke, Tancock finished in sixth position with a time of 53.39, some 0.21 seconds behind the bronze medal position. He also competed in the 200m individual medley, finishing in 8th place with a time of 2:00.76. His preferred event, the 50m backstroke, is not an Olympic event. Tancock said of the lack of a 50m event, "There is a 50m at every other major competition bar the Olympics. Don’t ask me why, but it never has been. It is not an issue but, of course, I would like it to be there".

He broke his own world record winning the gold medal for 50m backstroke at the 2009 World Aquatics Championships. He had set a time of 24.08 in the semi-finals, but improved it with a time of 24.04 in the final. It was the second gold of the event for the British team, who took home their best ever tally of seven medals in total. He wore a bodyskin swimsuit which was subsequently banned by FINA at the start of 2010.

In the 50m backstroke event at the 2010 Commonwealth Games in Delhi, he took the gold medal once more, breaking the Commonwealth Games record with a time of 24.62 in the final. He also took a second Commonwealth gold in the 100m backstroke with a time of 53.59. As of 2010, he was ranked second in the world for the 50m backstroke and third for the 100m, and following his success at the Commonwealth Games he was named BBC South West's Sportsman of the Year 2010.

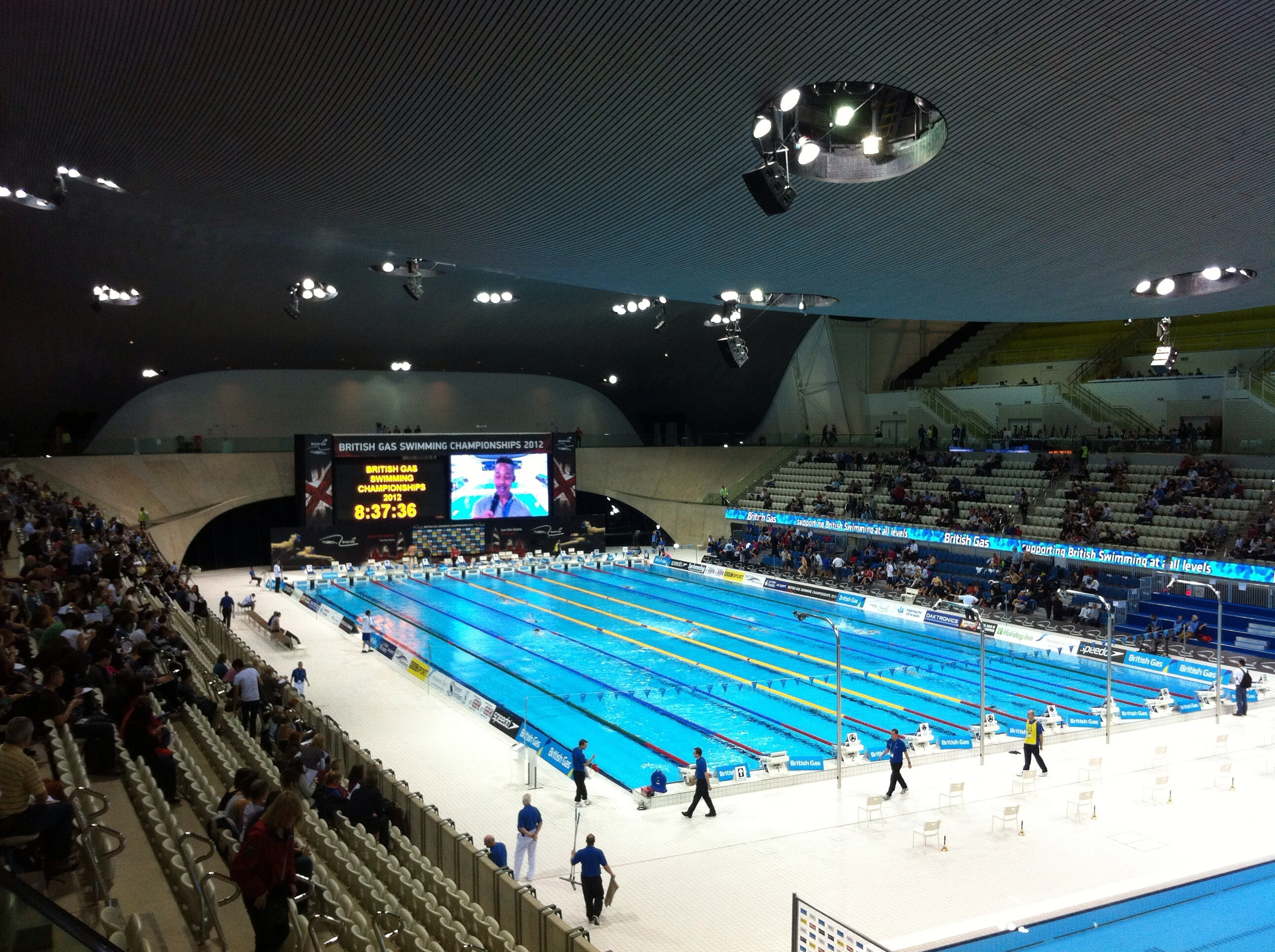
The interior of the London Aquatics Centre, where Tancock qualified for the Olympics and competed during the 2012 Games

At the 2011 World Aquatics Championships in Shanghai, Tancock retained his world championship crown with a time of 24.5 seconds in the 50m backstroke. It was the second occasion a British male swimmer had retained a world championship title, and he became the first man to retain the 50m backstroke title. He finished sixth in the 100m backstroke with a time of 52.76.

On 5 March 2012, Tancock won the 100m backstroke final at the British trials with a time of 53.16 seconds in the event held at the London Aquatics Centre. The victory qualified him for the 2012 Summer Olympics as part of the British team as the top two of each race qualified automatically. Whilst competing at the venue, which was the swimming venue at the 2012 Games, he did not find the controversial ceiling and lighting set up distracting, putting it down to the training he conducted for the 2009 World Championships, which were held outside. As part of his training regime for the Games, he took up ballet, kickboxing and rock climbing in order to improve on his position of sixth at the 2008 Games. He also pushed around his coach's car in order to improve his stamina and transfer his 50m backstroke form to the 100m event. Despite this, Tancock missed out on a medal as he finished fifth in the men's 100m backstroke final in a time of 53.35 seconds. He was also part of the Great Britain team that finished fourth in the 4 × 100 m medley relay, where they finished 32 milliseconds behind the Australian team in third. In November 2020, it was reported that Australia's Brenton Rickard tested positive for a banned substance which could lead to the GB Team being awarded a retrospective bronze medal.

=== 2013–present: Later career ===
Tancock achieved the World Championships qualifying time, but the team coach only chose swimmers who had a chance of being at Rio 2016. As a result of the 50m backstroke not being an event at the Olympics, Tancock was not selected for the team. At the 2014 Commonwealth Games, Tancock won bronze medals in the men's 50 metre backstroke and the 100 metre backstroke and helped England to win the 4 x 100 metre medley. At the age of 30, Tancock qualified for the final of the 100m backstroke at the World Aquatics Championships in a time of 53.19.

== Personal bests and records held ==
Long course (50 m)

Event	Time		Date	Meet	Location	Ref
100 m freestyle	48.76		19 Mar 2009	British Championships	Sheffield, United Kingdom	
50 m backstroke	24.04	Former WR	2 Aug 2009	World Championships	Rome, Italy	
100 m backstroke	52.73	NR	28 Jul 2009	World Championships	Rome, Italy	
200 m individual medley	1:57.79		1 Apr 2008	British Championships	Sheffield, United Kingdom	

Short course (25 m)

Event	Time		Date	Meet	Location	Ref
50 m backstroke	23.10	NR	7 Aug 2009	Grand Prix	Leeds, United Kingdom	
100 m backstroke	50.14	CR, ER, NR	10 Apr 2008	World SC Championships	Manchester, United Kingdom	
100 m individual medley	52.22	NR	13 Apr 2008	World SC Championships	Manchester, United Kingdom	
200 m individual medley	1:53.10	NR	11 Apr 2008	World SC Championships	Manchester, United Kingdom	

Legend: WR – World record; ER – European record; CR – Commonwealth record; NR – British record;
Records not set in finals: h – heat; sf – semifinal; r – relay 1st leg; rh – relay heat 1st leg; b – B final; † – en route to final mark; so – swim-off; tt – time trial

== Personal life ==
Liam is the younger of 2 boys born for mum Kim; his brother is 2 years older. His "fatboy" nickname originated from his older brother, although he didn't mean it in a negative sense. He currently trains at and swims for Loughborough University. He is a supporter of Exeter City association football club, and Exeter Chiefs Rugby club Liam is now trained as a level two swimming coach. Over his career he has been an ambassador for Speedo from 2006 to 2012, For Goodness Shakes, and Gilette.

Tancock has been in a relationship with fellow swimmer Caitlin McClatchey since 2006, and they were married in 2019.

== See also ==
- List of Commonwealth Games medallists in swimming (men)
- World record progression 50 metres backstroke

Records
Preceded by Thomas Rupprath; Randall Bal	Men's 50-metre backstroke world record-holder 2 April – 5 December 2008; 1 August 2009 – 4 August 2018	Succeeded by Randall Bal; Kliment Kolesnikov
