= List of British records in swimming =

The British records in swimming are ratified by the United Kingdom's governing body in swimming, British Swimming. Records can be set in long course (50 metres) or short course (25 metres) swimming pools, with records currently recorded in the following events for both men and women.

- Freestyle: 50 m, 100 m, 200 m, 400 m, 800 m, 1500 m
- Backstroke: 50 m, 100 m, 200 m
- Breaststroke: 50 m, 100 m, 200 m
- Butterfly: 50 m, 100 m, 200 m
- Individual medley: 100 m (short course only), 200 m, 400 m
- Relays: 4×50 m freestyle (short course only), 4 × 100 m freestyle, 4 × 200 m freestyle, 4×50 m freestyle (short course only), 4 × 100 m medley

The relay records displayed here are the official national relay records. However, British Swimming maintains a separate set of national relay records for club teams, which are not shown here. Records can also be set at intermediate distances in an individual race and for the first leg of a relay race.

The ratification process involves the swimmer submitting an application to British Swimming, providing details such as the swimmer's name(s), time swum, date and location of the swim, names of officials, and the swimsuit model worn. Once ratified, the records appear on the official records listing. Records that have not yet been fully ratified are marked with a '#' symbol in these lists, and all records were achieved in finals unless otherwise noted.

== Long course (50 m) ==
=== Men ===
Event	Time		Name	Club	Date	Meet	Location	Ref
50m freestyle	21.11	sf	Ben Proud	Great Britain	8 August 2018	European Championships	Glasgow, Great Britain	
50m freestyle	20.98	unofficial	Ben Proud	Great Britain	24 May 2026	Enhanced Games	Las Vegas, United States	
100m freestyle	47.45		Matthew Richards	Great Britain	27 July 2023	World Championships	Fukuoka, Japan	
200m freestyle	1:44.22		Tom Dean	Great Britain	27 July 2021	Olympic Games	Tokyo, Japan	
400m freestyle	3:43.75		James Guy	Great Britain	2 August 2015	World Championships	Kazan, Russia	
800m freestyle	7:44.32		David Davies	Great Britain	29 July 2009	World Championships	Rome, Italy	
1500m freestyle	14:45.95		David Davies	Great Britain	21 August 2004	Olympic Games	Athens, Greece	
50m backstroke	24.04	CR	Liam Tancock	Great Britain	2 August 2009	World Championships	Rome, Italy	
100m backstroke	52.12		Oliver Morgan	University of Birmingham	16 April 2025	British Championships	London, United Kingdom	
200m backstroke	1:54.43	sf	Luke Greenbank	Great Britain	21 May 2021	European Championships	Budapest, Hungary	
50m breaststroke	25.95	sf, WR	Adam Peaty	Great Britain	25 July 2017	World Championships	Budapest, Hungary	
100m breaststroke	56.88	sf, WR	Adam Peaty	Great Britain	21 July 2019	World Championships	Gwangju, South Korea	
200m breaststroke	2:07.30		Ross Murdoch	Scotland	24 July 2014	Commonwealth Games	Glasgow, Great Britain	
50m butterfly	22.74	sf	Ben Proud	Great Britain	27 July 2025	World Championships	Singapore, Singapore	
50m butterfly	22.32	unofficial	Ben Proud	Great Britain	24 May 2026	Enhanced Games	Las Vegas, United States	
100m butterfly	50.67	sf	James Guy	Great Britain	28 July 2017	World Championships	Budapest, Hungary	
200m butterfly	1:54.58	sf	Michael Rock	Great Britain	28 July 2009	World Championships	Rome, Italy	
200m individual medley	1:55.28	CR	Duncan Scott	Great Britain	30 July 2021	Olympic Games	Tokyo, Japan	
400m individual medley	4:08.85		Max Litchfield	Great Britain	28 July 2024	Olympic Games	Paris, France	
4×100m freestyle relay	3:10.73		Jacob Mills (48.51); Matthew Richards (47.32); Jacob Whittle (47.67); Duncan Scott (47.23)	Great Britain	27 July 2025	World Championships	Singapore, Singapore	
4×200m freestyle relay	6:58.58	ER	Tom Dean (1:45.72); James Guy (1:44.40); Matthew Richards (1:45.01); Duncan Scott (1:43.45)	Great Britain	28 July 2021	Olympic Games	Tokyo, Japan	
4×100m medley relay	3:27.51		Luke Greenbank (53.63); Adam Peaty (56.53); James Guy (50.27); Duncan Scott (47.08)	Great Britain	1 August 2021	Olympic Games	Tokyo, Japan	

Legend: # – Record awaiting ratification by British Swimming; WR – World record; ER – European record; CR – Commonwealth record;
Records not set in finals: h – heat; sf – semifinal; r – relay 1st leg; rh – relay heat 1st leg; b – B final; † – en route to final mark; so – swim-off; tt – time trial

=== Women ===
Event	Time		Name	Club	Date	Meet	Location	Ref
50m freestyle	23.96		Francesca Halsall	England	26 July 2014	Commonwealth Games	Glasgow, Great Britain	
100m freestyle	52.75	h	Anna Hopkin	Great Britain	28 July 2021	Olympic Games	Tokyo, Japan	
200m freestyle	1:54.34		Freya Colbert	Loughborough Performance	16 April 2026	British Championships	London, United Kingdom	
400m freestyle	4:00.60		Joanne Jackson	Great Britain	26 July 2009	World Championships	Rome, Italy	
800m freestyle	8:14.10		Rebecca Adlington	Great Britain	16 August 2008	Olympic Games	Beijing, China	
1500m freestyle	15:47.26		Jazmin Carlin	Swansea University	28 June 2013	World Championships Trials	Sheffield, United Kingdom	
50m backstroke	27.15	=	Lauren Cox	Great Britain	24 May 2025	AP Race London International	London, Great Britain	
50m backstroke	27.15	=, #	Lauren Cox	Great Britain	13 August 2026	European Championships	Paris, France	
100m backstroke	58.08	r, ER	Kathleen Dawson	Great Britain	23 May 2021	European Championships	Budapest, Hungary	
200m backstroke	2:06.66		Gemma Spofforth	Great Britain	1 August 2009	World Championships	Rome, Italy	
200m backstroke	2:06.13	#	Katie Shanahan	Great Britain	11 August 2026	European Championships	Paris, France	
50m breaststroke	30.02		Imogen Clark	England	30 July 2022	Commonwealth Games	Birmingham, Great Britain	
100m breaststroke	1:04.96		Angharad Evans	University of Stirling	19 April 2026	British Championships	London, United Kingdom	
100m breaststroke	1:04.87	#	Angharad Evans	Great Britain	12 August 2026	European Championships	Paris, France	
200m breaststroke	2:19.70		Angharad Evans	University of Stirling	16 April 2026	British Championships	London, United Kingdom	
50m butterfly	25.20	CR	Francesca Halsall	England	27 July 2014	Commonwealth Games	Glasgow, Great Britain	
100m butterfly	57.25	=	Ellen Gandy	Beckenham	4 March 2012	British Championships	London, United Kingdom	
100m butterfly	57.25	=, #	Keanna MacInnes	Great Britain	14 August 2026	European Championships	Paris, France	
200m butterfly	2:04.83		Ellen Gandy	Beckenham	10 March 2009	British Championships	Sheffield, United Kingdom	
200m individual medley	2:06.88		Siobhan-Marie O'Connor	Great Britain	9 August 2016	Olympic Games	Rio de Janeiro, Brazil	
400m individual medley	4:31.33		Hannah Miley	Garioch	20 March 2009	British Championships	Sheffield, United Kingdom	
4×100m freestyle relay	3:33.90		Anna Hopkin (53.67); Lucy Hope (53.53); Abbie Wood (54.19); Freya Anderson (52.51)	Great Britain	23 July 2023	World Championships	Fukuoka, Japan	
4×200m freestyle relay	7:45.51	ER	Joanne Jackson (1:55.98); Jazmin Carlin (1:56.78); Caitlin McClatchey (1:56.42); Rebecca Adlington (1:56.33)	Great Britain	30 July 2009	World Championships	Rome, Italy	
4×100m medley relay	3:54.01		Kathleen Dawson (58.08); Molly Renshaw (1:05.72); Laura Stephens (57.55); Anna Hopkin (52.66)	Great Britain	23 May 2021	European Championships	Budapest, Hungary	
4×100m medley relay	3:53.50	#	Lauren Cox (59.67); Angharad Evans (1:03.75); Keanna MacInnes (56.81); Freya Colbert (53.27)	Great Britain	16 August 2026	European Championships	Paris, France	

Legend: # – Record awaiting ratification by British Swimming; WR – World record; ER – European record; CR – Commonwealth record;
Records not set in finals: h – heat; sf – semifinal; r – relay 1st leg; rh – relay heat 1st leg; b – B final; † – en route to final mark; so – swim-off; tt – time trial

=== Mixed relay ===
Event	Time		Name	Club	Date	Meet	Location	Ref
4×100 m freestyle relay	3:21.68	ER	Matthew Richards (47.83); Duncan Scott (47.46); Anna Hopkin (53.30); Freya Anderson (53.09)	Great Britain	29 July 2023	World Championships	Fukuoka, Japan	
4×200 m freestyle relay	7:26.67		Thomas Dean (1:46.54); James Guy (1:45.43); Abbie Wood (1:56.67); Freya Anderson (1:58.03)	Great Britain	18 May 2021	European Championships	Budapest, Hungary	
4×200 m freestyle relay	7:24.13	#	Jack McMillan (1:47.09); Matthew Richards (1:45.85); Freya Colbert (1:55.23); Freya Anderson (1:55.96)	Great Britain	15 August 2026	European Championships	Paris, France	
4×100 m medley relay	3:37.58	ER	Kathleen Dawson (58.80); Adam Peaty (56.78); James Guy (50.00); Anna Hopkin (52.00)	Great Britain	31 July 2021	Olympic Games	Tokyo, Japan	

Legend: # – Record awaiting ratification by British Swimming; WR – World record; ER – European record; CR – Commonwealth record;
Records not set in finals: h – heat; so – swim-off

== Short course (25 m) ==
=== Men ===
Event	Time		Name	Club	Date	Meet	Location	Ref
50m freestyle	20.18	ER	Benjamin Proud	Great Britain	7 December 2023	European Championships	Otopeni, Romania	
100m freestyle	45.82		Matthew Richards	Great Britain	6 December 2025	European Championships	Lublin, Poland	
200m freestyle	1:39.83	CR	Duncan Scott	Great Britain	2 November 2024	World Cup	Incheon, South Korea	
400m freestyle	3:34.46	CR	Duncan Scott	Great Britain	31 October 2024	World Cup	Singapore, Singapore	
800m freestyle	7:33.56		Tyler Melbourne-Smith	Loughborough University	14 December 2025	Swim England National Winter Championships	Sheffield, United Kingdom	
1500m freestyle	14:24.00		Tim Shuttleworth	Loughborough; University	17 December 2016	ASA Winter Meet	Sheffield, United Kingdom	
50m backstroke	22.85		Oliver Morgan	Great Britain	7 December 2025	European Championships	Lublin, Poland	
100m backstroke	49.55	h	Oliver Morgan	Great Britain	4 December 2025	European Championships	Lublin, Poland	
200m backstroke	1:48.36		Cameron Brooker	Bath University	11 December 2025	Swim England National Winter Championships	Sheffield, United Kingdom	
50m breaststroke	25.41		Adam Peaty	London Roar	22 November 2020	International Swimming League	Budapest, Hungary	
100m breaststroke	55.41	CR	Adam Peaty	London Roar	22 November 2020	International Swimming League	Budapest, Hungary	
200m breaststroke	2:01.43	CR	Michael Jamieson	Great Britain	15 December 2013	European Championships	Herning, Denmark	
50m butterfly	22.10		Jacob Peters	Great Britain	9 December 2023	European Championships	Otopeni, Romania	
100m butterfly	49.21	sf	Adam Barrett	Great Britain	7 December 2016	World Championships	Windsor, Canada	
200m butterfly	1:50.64		Edward Mildred	Manchester PC	14 December 2025	Swim England National Winter Championships	Sheffield, United Kingdom	
100m individual medley	51.14		Duncan Scott	Great Britain	18 October 2024	World Cup	Shanghai, China	
200m individual medley	1:50.98		Duncan Scott	Great Britain	8 December 2023	European Championships	Otopeni, Romania	
400m individual medley	3:59.81		Duncan Scott	London Roar	20 December 2019	International Swimming League	Las Vegas, United States	
4×50m freestyle relay	1:22.52		Benjamin Proud (20.56); Matthew Richards (20.50); Alexander Cohoon (20.99); Lewis Burras (20.47)	Great Britain	5 December 2023	European Championships	Otopeni, Romania	
4×100m freestyle relay	3:09.25	h	Matthew Richards (47.49); Edward Mildred (47.92); Thomas Dean (47.02); Benjamin Proud (46.82)	Great Britain	16 December 2021	World Championships	Abu Dhabi, United Arab Emirates	
4×200m freestyle relay	6:56.52		Robert Renwick (1:44.83); David Carry (1:44.19); Andrew Hunter (1:44.04); Ross Davenport (1:43.46)	Great Britain	10 April 2008	World Championships	Manchester, United Kingdom	
4×50m medley relay	1:32.30	CR	Chris Walker-Hebborn (23.31); Adam Peaty (25.71); Adam Barrett (22.23); Benjamin Proud (21.05)	Great Britain	4 December 2014	World Championships	Doha, Qatar	
4×100m medley relay	3:22.78	CR	Chris Walker-Hebborn (50.57); Adam Peaty (56.23); Adam Barrett (49.01); Benjamin Proud (46.97)	Great Britain	7 December 2014	World Championships	Doha, Qatar	

Legend: # – Record awaiting ratification by British Swimming; WR – World record; ER – European record; CR – Commonwealth record;
Records not set in finals: h – heat; sf – semifinal; r – relay 1st leg; rh – relay heat 1st leg; b – B final; † – en route to final mark; so – swim-off; tt – time trial

=== Women ===
Event	Time		Name	Club	Date	Meet	Location	Ref
50 m freestyle	23.44		Francesca Halsall	Great Britain	19 December 2009	Duel in the Pool	Manchester, United Kingdom	
100 m freestyle	51.19		Francesca Halsall	Great Britain	22 November 2009	World Cup	Singapore, Singapore	
200 m freestyle	1:51.87		Freya Anderson	London Roar	22 November 2020	International Swimming League	Budapest, Hungary	
400 m freestyle	3:54.92		Joanne Jackson	Loughborough; University	8 August 2008	British Grand Prix	Leeds, United Kingdom	
800 m freestyle	8:08.16		Jazmin Carlin	Great Britain	4 December 2014	World Championships	Doha, Qatar	
1500 m freestyle	15:46.15		Fleur Lewis	Loughborough; University	17 November 2023	BUCS Championships	Sheffield, United Kingdom	
50 m backstroke	26.03		Lauren Cox	Great Britain	7 December 2025	European Championships	Lublin, Poland	
100 m backstroke	56.35		Elizabeth Simmonds	Bath University	17 December 2015	ASA Winter Meet	Sheffield, Great Britain	
200 m backstroke	2:00.83		Elizabeth Simmonds	Great Britain	16 December 2011	Duel in the Pool	Atlanta, United States	
50m breaststroke	29.17		Imogen Clark	Derby Excel	16 December 2023	Swim England National Winter Championships	Sheffield, Great Britain	
100m breaststroke	1:03.45	h	Angharad Evans	Great Britain	11 December 2024	World Championships	Budapest, Hungary	
200m breaststroke	2:17.10		Jocelyn Ulyett	Loughborough; University	6 December 2019	Swim England Winter Championships	Sheffield, Great Britain	
50m butterfly	25.29		Francesca Halsall	Great Britain	29 October 2014	World Cup	Tokyo, Japan	
100m butterfly	55.71		Francesca Halsall	Great Britain	18 December 2009	Duel in the Pool	Manchester, United Kingdom	
200m butterfly	2:03.19		Jemma Lowe	Great Britain	12 December 2012	World Championships	Istanbul, Turkey	
100m individual medley	57.59	sf	Siobhan-Marie O'Connor	Great Britain	3 December 2015	European Championships	Netanya, Israel	
200m individual medley	2:02.75	CR	Abbie Wood	Great Britain	10 December 2024	World Championships	Budapest, Hungary	
400m individual medley	4:23.14		Hannah Miley	Great Britain	12 December 2012	World Championships	Istanbul, Turkey	
4×50m freestyle relay	1:36.18		Anna Hopkin (23.74); Siobhan-Marie O'Connor (24.28); Georgia Davies (24.69); Freya Anderson (23.47)	Great Britain	6 December 2019	European Championships	Glasgow, Great Britain	
4×100m freestyle relay	3:32.88		Francesca Halsall (52.36); Caitlin McClatchey (53.25); Julia Beckett (53.54); Melanie Marshall (53.73)	Great Britain	12 April 2008	World Championships	Manchester, United Kingdom	
4×200m freestyle relay	7:38.96		Joanne Jackson (1:54.78); Melanie Marshall (1:55.83); Caitlin McClatchey (1:54.64); Rebecca Adlington (1:53.71)	Great Britain	10 April 2008	World Championships	Manchester, United Kingdom	
4×50m medley relay	1:44.67		Kathleen Dawson (26.97); Imogen Clark (28.66); Keanna MacInnes (25.69); Anna Hopkin (23.35)	Great Britain	7 December 2023	European Championships	Otopeni, Romania	
4×100m medley relay	3:47.84		Abbie Wood (57.44); Angharad Evans (1:03.18); Eva Okaro (56.11); Freya Anderson (51.11)	Great Britain	15 December 2024	World Championships	Budapest, Hungary	

Legend: # – Record awaiting ratification by British Swimming; WR – World record; ER – European record; CR – Commonwealth record;
Records not set in finals: h – heat; sf – semifinal; r – relay 1st leg; rh – relay heat 1st leg; b – B final; † – en route to final mark; so – swim-off; tt – time trial

=== Mixed relay ===
Event	Time	Name	Club	Date	Meet	Location	Ref
4×50 m freestyle relay	1:27.75	Benjamin Proud (20.39); Lewis Burras (20.69); Anna Hopkin (22.95); Freya Anderson (23.72)	Great Britain	9 December 2023	European Championships	Otopeni, Romania	
4×50 m medley relay	1:37.07	Medi Harris (26.60); Adam Peaty (25.24); Ben Proud (21.93); Anna Hopkin (23.30)	Great Britain	14 December 2022	World Championships	Melbourne, Australia	
4×100 m medley relay	3:35.46	Oliver Morgan (50.53); Angharad Evans (1:03.44); Joshua Gammon (50.00); Eva Okaro (51.49)	Great Britain	14 December 2024	World Championships	Budapest, Hungary	

Legend: # – Record awaiting ratification by British Swimming; WR – World record; ER – European record; CR – Commonwealth record;
Records not set in finals: h – heat; so – swim-off

== Gallery ==
Some of the current British record holders:

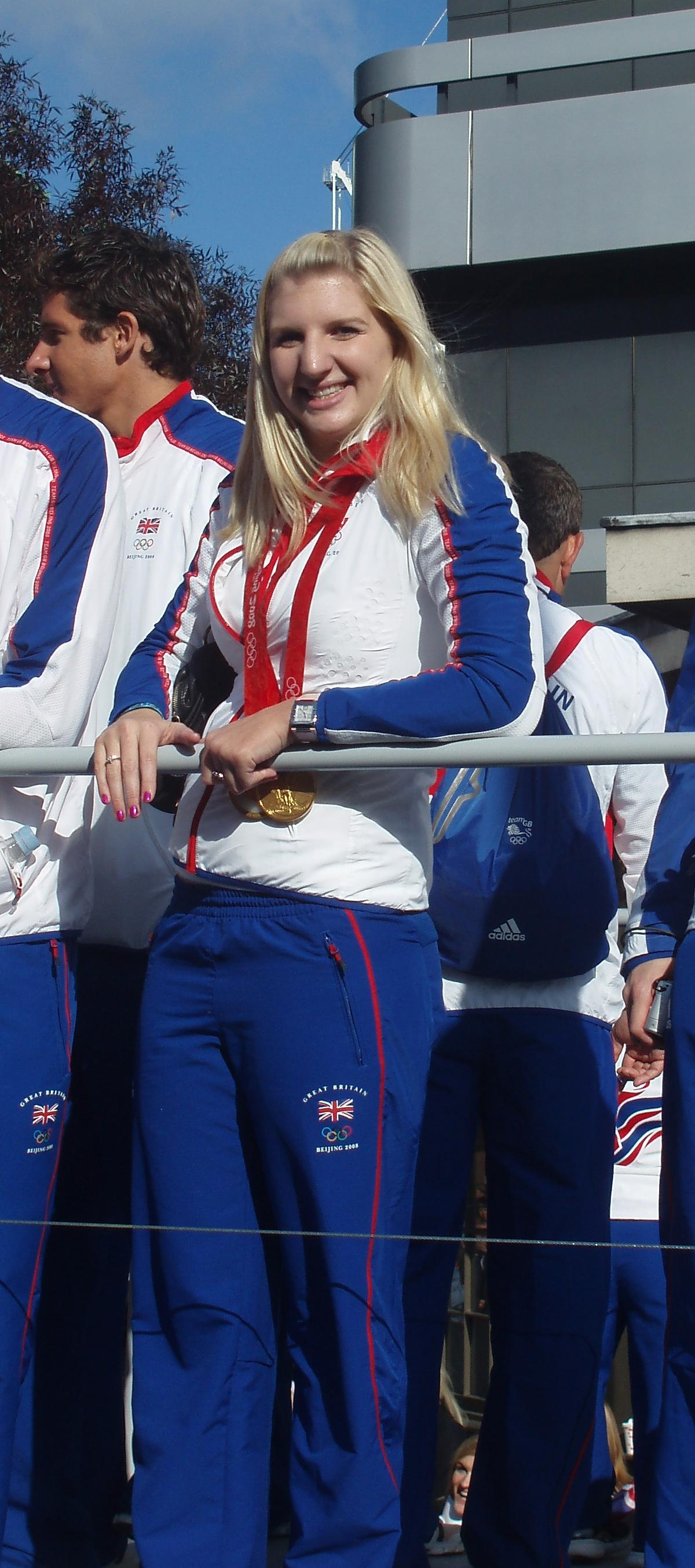
Rebecca Adlington, current long course record holder in the 800 metres freestyle, which is also the former European record.

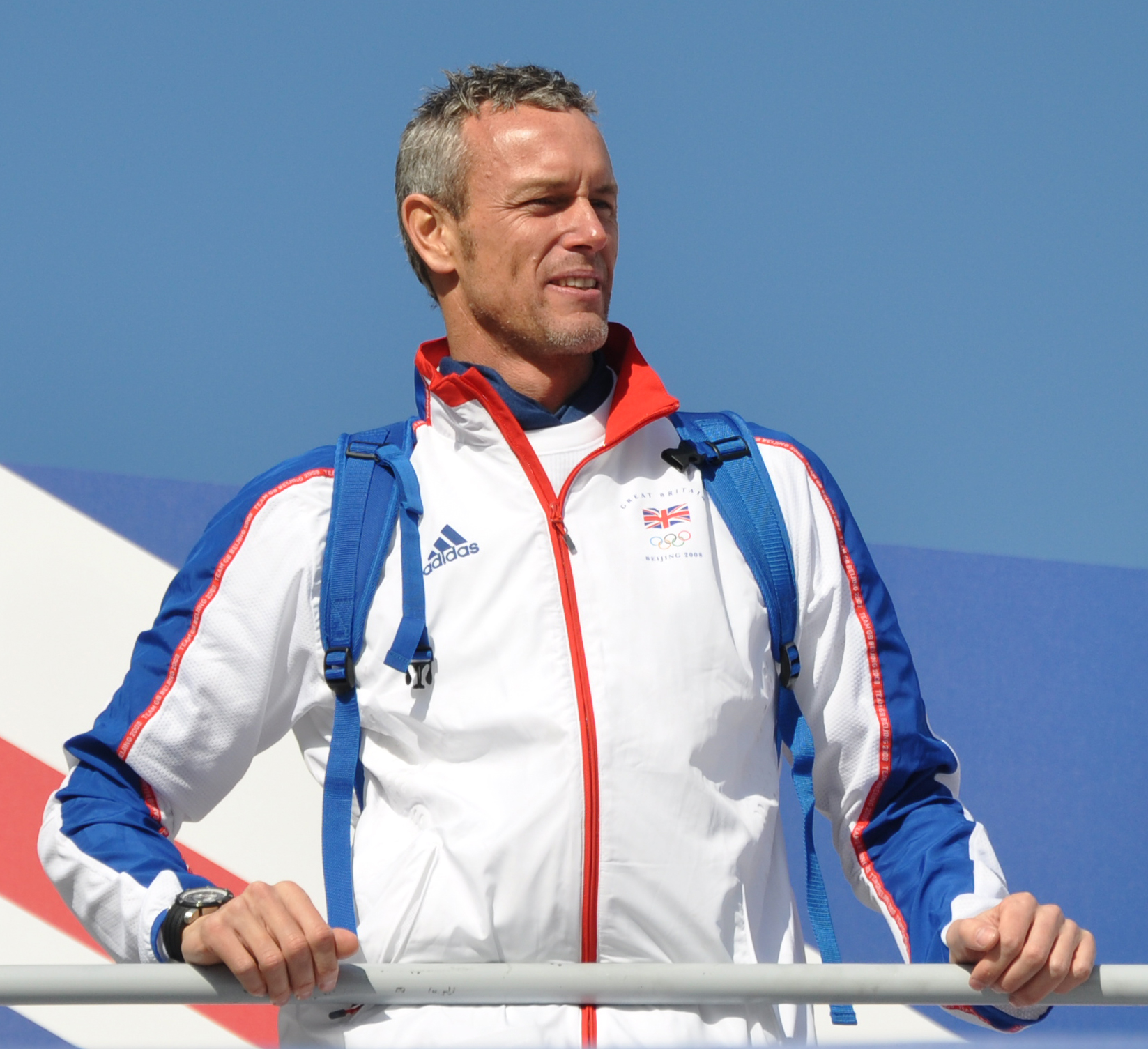
Mark Foster, current short course record holder in both freestyle and butterfly over 50 metres.

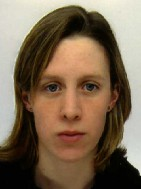
Hannah Miley, current long course and short course record holder in the 400 metres individual medley.

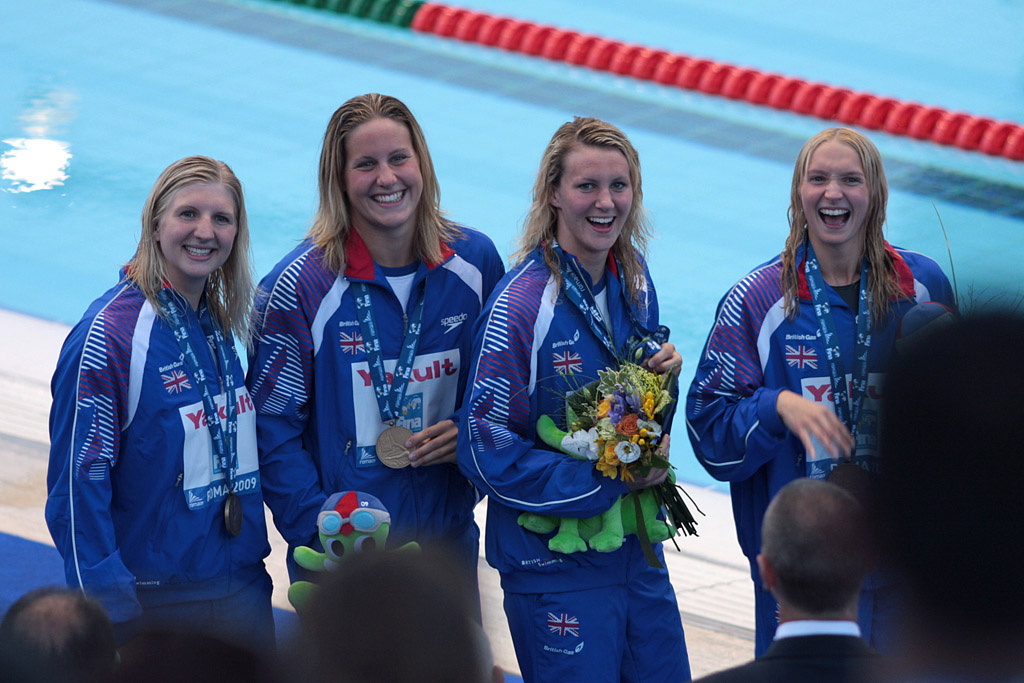
Rebecca Adlington, Joanne Jackson, Jazmin Carlin and Caitlin McClatchey – 4×200 m freestyle relay long course record holders.
