= 2014 FINA World Swimming Championships (25 m) – Women's 800 metre freestyle =

Women's 800 metre freestyle at the 2014 FINA World Swimming Championships (25 m)
- Dates: 4 December
- Competitors: 37 from 29 nations
- Winning time: 8:03.41

Medalists
gold medal	Mireia Belmonte	Spain
silver medal	Jazmin Carlin	Great Britain
bronze medal	Sharon van Rouwendaal	Netherlands

The women's 800 metre freestyle competition of the 2014 FINA World Swimming Championships (25 m) was held on 4 December.

== Records ==
Prior to the competition, the existing world and championship records were as follows.

	Name	Nation	Time	Location	Date
World record	Mireia Belmonte	Spain	7:59.34	Berlin	10 August 2013
Championship record	Rebecca Adlington	Great Britain	8:08.25	Manchester	10 April 2008

The following records were established during the competition:

Date	Event	Name	Nation	Time	Record
4 December	Final	Mireia Belmonte	Spain	8:03.41	CR

== Results ==
=== Final ===
The final was held at 19:42.

Rank	Heat	Lane	Name	Nationality	Time	Notes
1st place, gold medalist(s)	4	4	Mireia Belmonte	Spain	8:03.41	CR
2nd place, silver medalist(s)	4	3	Jazmin Carlin	Great Britain	8:08.16	
3rd place, bronze medalist(s)	4	6	Sharon van Rouwendaal	Netherlands	8:08.17	
4	3*	3	Boglárka Kapás	Hungary	8:16.32	
5	4	7	Sarah Köhler	Germany	8:17.08	
6	3*	1	María Vilas	Spain	8:18.82	
7	3*	9	Lindsay Vrooman	United States	8:19.36	
8	3*	5	Hannah Miley	Great Britain	8:20.09	
9	4	5	Katinka Hosszú	Hungary	8:20.71	
10	2*	4	Julie Lauridsen	Denmark	8:22.78	
11	2*	5	Samantha Arévalo	Ecuador	8:23.72	
12	4	8	Elizabeth Beisel	United States	8:23.74	
13	3*	2	Asami Chida	Japan	8:24.18	
14	4	1	Julia Hassler	Liechtenstein	8:25.85	
15	1*	8	Nguyễn Thị Ánh Viên	Vietnam	8:27.36	
16	3*	4	Katie Goldman	Australia	8:28.33	
17	2*	3	Gaja Natlacen	Slovenia	8:28.49	
18	4	2	Cao Yue	China	8:29.74	
19	3*	0	Guo Junjun	China	8:30.14	
20	3*	7	Leonie Beck	Germany	8:31.96	
21	2*	6	Ayumi Macías	Mexico	8:33.90	
22	2*	8	Monique Olivier	Luxembourg	8:35.09	
23	3*	6	Miho Takahashi	Japan	8:36.13	
24	3*	8	Joanna Evans	Bahamas	8:38.07	
25	2*	7	Inga Elín Cryer	Iceland	8:38.79	
26	2*	2	Montserrat Ortuño	Mexico	8:41.95	
27	2*	9	Valerie Gruest	Guatemala	8:44.78	
28	2*	1	Veronika Kolníková	Slovakia	8:52.11	
29	2*	0	Daniela Miyahara	Peru	8:53.13	
30	1*	5	Erika García	Peru	8:54.24	
31	1*	4	Rebeca Quinteros	El Salvador	9:00.06	
32	1*	2	Cecilia Eysturdal	Faroe Islands	9:01.74	
33	1*	7	Malavika Vishwanath	India	9:08.20	
34	1*	6	Tuana Ayça Bahtoğlu	Turkey	9:10.98	
35	1*	1	Ana Semiruncic	Moldova	9:23.45	
36	1*	0	San Khant Khant Su	Myanmar	9:51.98	
37	1*	9	Victoria Chentsova	Northern Mariana Islands	9:55.15	
—	1*	3	Lani Cabrera	Barbados		DNS

*Raced in slower heats.
