= Thomas Haffield =

Welsh swimmer

Personal information
- Full name: Thomas Paul Haffield
- Nickname: Tom
- National team: Great Britain
- Born: 28 January 1988 (age 38) Neath, Wales
- Height: 1.80 m (5 ft 11 in)
- Weight: 71 kg (157 lb)

Sport
- Sport: Swimming
- Strokes: Individual medley
- Club: City of Cardiff

Thomas Paul "Tom" Haffield (born 28 January 1988) is a former Welsh competitive swimmer who was best known for his participating in individual medley events. He has represented Great Britain in the Olympic Games, and Wales in the Commonwealth Games. At the 2008 Summer Olympics in Beijing, he competed in the 400-metre individual medley swimming event.

== Personal bests and records held ==
Event	Long course	Short course
200 m freestyle	1.52.59	
400 m freestyle	3.54.82	
200 m backstroke	2.02.91	
200 m butterfly	2.01.64	
200 m breaststroke	2.15.34	
200 m individual medley	2.03.80	
400 m individual medley	4:11.32 ^{NR CR}	4:05.78
Key NR:British
