= Michael Rock (swimmer) =

British butterfly stroke swimmer (born 1987)

Personal information
- Full name: Michael Rock
- Nicknames: Rocky, The Rock
- Nationality: United Kingdom
- Born: 13 March 1987 (age 39) Liverpool, England
- Height: 1.78 m (5 ft 10 in)
- Weight: 77 kg (170 lb; 12.1 st)

Sport
- Sport: Swimming
- Strokes: Butterfly
- Club: Everton SC, Stockport Metro SC and City of Liverpool SC
- College team: University of Manchester
Medal record
Men's swimming
Representing England
Commonwealth Games
Silver medal – second place	2010 Delhi	200 m butterfly

Michael Paul Rock (born 13 March 1987) is a British butterfly stroke swimmer. He attended St. Edward's College, Liverpool, from 1998 to 2003.

As of 2008 he is a student at The University of Manchester, and is studying law.

== Swimming career ==
Rock competed in the 100 m and 200 m butterfly events at the 2008 Summer Olympics in Beijing, China, after becoming British champion in both events at the 2008 British Olympic Swimming Trials in Sheffield.

At the 2010 Commonwealth Games in Delhi, India, competed in the 100 and 200m butterfly events, where he won silver at 200m.

Long course (50 m)

Event	Time		Date	Meet	Location	Ref
100 m butterfly	51.41	^{NR}	23 Aug 2009	World Championships	Rome, Italy	
200 m butterfly	1:54.58	^{NR}	24 Aug 2009	World Championships	Rome, Italy	

Short course (25 m)

Event	Time		Date	Meet	Location	Ref
100 m butterfly	50.13	^{NR}	11 Nov 2009	World Cup	Stockholm, Sweden	
200 m butterfly	1:51.32		10 Nov 2009	World Cup	Stockholm, Sweden	

Legend: WR – World record; ER – European record; CR – Commonwealth record; NR – British record;
Records not set in finals: h – heat; sf – semifinal; r – relay 1st leg; rh – relay heat 1st leg; b – B final; † – en route to final mark; so – swim-off; tt – time trial
