= Joanne Jackson (swimmer) =

English swimmer

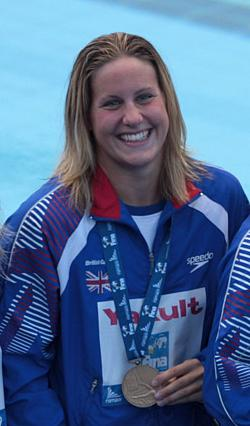
- Jackson at 2009 World Championships

Personal information
- Full name: Joanne Amy Jackson
- Nickname: "Jo"
- National team: Great Britain
- Born: 12 September 1986 (age 39) Northallerton, England
- Height: 1.84 m (6 ft 0 in)
- Weight: 76 kg (168 lb; 12.0 st)
- Website: JoanneJackson.com

Sport
- Sport: Swimming
- Strokes: Freestyle
- Club: Derwentside SC
- College team: Loughborough University
Medal record
Women's swimming
Representing Great Britain
Olympic Games
Bronze medal – third place	2008 Beijing	400 m freestyle
World Championships – Long Course
Silver medal – second place	2009 Rome	400 m freestyle
Silver medal – second place	2009 Rome	800 m freestyle
Bronze medal – third place	2009 Rome	4×200 m freestyle
World Championships – Short Course
Silver medal – second place	2008 Manchester	4×200 m freestyle
Bronze medal – third place	2008 Manchester	400 m freestyle
European Championships – Long Course
Silver medal – second place	2006 Budapest	400 m freestyle
Silver medal – second place	2008 Eindhoven	4×200 m freestyle
Silver medal – second place	2010 Budapest	4×100 m freestyle
Bronze medal – third place	2010 Budapest	4×200 m freestyle
European Championships – Short Course
Gold medal – first place	2003 Dublin	400 m freestyle
Silver medal – second place	2005 Trieste	400 m freestyle
Bronze medal – third place	2006 Helsinki	400 m freestyle
Representing England
Commonwealth Games
Silver medal – second place	2006 Melbourne	400 m freestyle
Silver medal – second place	2006 Melbourne	4×200 m freestyle
Bronze medal – third place	2010 Delhi	4×200 m freestyle

Joanne Amy Jackson (born 12 September 1986) is an English freestyle swimmer. She is the sister of retired Olympic swimmer Nicola Jackson. She was born in Northallerton and went to Richmond School, North Yorkshire.

== Swimming career ==
=== 2003 ===
Jackson won the 400 m freestyle event at the 2003 European Short Course Swimming Championships.

=== 2004 ===
She swam in the 2004 Athens Olympics in the 400 m freestyle and 4×200 m freestyle relay. She was partly funded by Richmondshire District Council.

=== 2006 ===
In the 2006 Commonwealth Games she won a silver medal in the 400 m freestyle event.

=== 2008 ===
On 11 August 2008 at the 2008 Summer Olympics she won a bronze medal in 400 m freestyle, finished 14th in the 200 m freestyle and 9th as part of the Great British team in the 4 × 200 m freestyle relay.

=== 2009 ===
On 16 March 2009 she set a new world record in the 400 m freestyle (long course) in a time of 4:00.66, beating her British rival and reigning Olympic gold medallist Rebecca Adlington in the process, who also broke the previous world record with a time of 4:00.89.

On 26 July, she claimed silver in the 400-metre freestyle at the 2009 World Aquatics Championships, finishing behind Pellegrini but ahead of Adlington. She then went on to claim a bronze medal in the 4×200 m freestyle relay and a silver medal in the 800 m freestyle – the most medals that any British swimmer has ever won in a single world championships.

=== 2012 ===
At the London 2012 Olympics, Jackson finished seventh in her 400 m freestyle heat in a time of 4:11.50 and was also part of the British team that finished in fifth place in the 4×200 m freestyle relay.

== Retirement from swimming ==
After retiring from competitive swimming in 2012, Jackson went on to establish the Joanne Jackson Swim Academy with former Olympic swimmer Grant Turner.

== Personal bests and records held ==
Event	Long course	Short course
200 m freestyle	1:55.54 (2009) ^{NR}	1:56.72 (2005) 1.52.8 relay leg at UK GP 2009
400 m freestyle	4:00.60 (2009) ^{NR}	3:54.92 (2009) ^{WR}
800 m freestyle	8:16.66 (2009)	8:15.50 (2007)
Record Key NR:British

== See also ==
- List of Olympic medalists in swimming (women)
- List of World Aquatics Championships medalists in swimming (women)
- List of Commonwealth Games medallists in swimming (women)
- World record progression 400 metres freestyle

Records
Preceded by Federica Pellegrini	Women's 400 metre freestyle world record holder (long course); 16 March 2009 – 27 June 2009	Succeeded by Federica Pellegrini
Preceded by Laure Manaudou	Women's 400 metre freestyle world record holder (short course); 8 August 2009 – present	Succeeded by Incumbent
