= Robert Lijesen =

Dutch swimmer (born 1985)

Personal information
- Full name: Robert Lijesen
- Nationality: Netherlands
- Born: 5 February 1985 (age 41) Dordrecht
- Height: 1.91 m (6 ft 3 in)
- Weight: 78 kg (172 lb)

Sport
- Sport: Swimming
- Strokes: freestyle
- Club: Nationaal Zweminstituut Eindhoven
Medal record
Men's Swimming
Representing the Netherlands
World Championships (SC)
Silver medal – second place	2008 Manchester	4×100 m freestyle
European Championships (LC)
Bronze medal – third place	2008 Eindhoven	4×100 m freestyle

Robert Lijesen (born 5 February 1985 in Dordrecht) is a Dutch Swimmer, who is specialized in the 50 and 100 m freestyle. He is currently trained by former world champion Marcel Wouda at the same club as multiple olympic champion Pieter van den Hoogenband. He holds the European record in the 4 × 100 m freestyle Short Course together with Bas van Velthoven, Mitja Zastrow and Robin van Aggele in 3:09.18 swum during the World SC Championships 2008 in Manchester they finished second in this event behind the United States who swam a world record in the same race.

== Swimming career ==
Lijesen made his international senior debut at the 2006 FINA Short Course World Championships in Shanghai with 23rd place in the 100 m freestyle.

=== 2008 ===
He was part of the team that broke the European record in the 4 × 100 m freestyle (SC) at the 2008 FINA Short Course World Championships alongside Bas van Velthoven, Mitja Zastrow and Robin van Aggele winning a silver medal doing so. Individually he reached 17th place in the 50 m freestyle. With the 4 × 100 m medley relay he reached an 8th place together with Bastiaan Tamminga, van Aggele and Joeri Verlinden swimming a new national record.

A few weeks before at the 2008 European Aquatics Championships in Eindhoven he won the bronze medal in the 4 × 100 m freestyle, where he split faster than Pieter van den Hoogenband who was later revealed suffered from the flu. Individually he ended 12th in the 100 m freestyle, in the 50 m freestyle he reached the final where he finished 6th.

At the 2008 Summer Olympics he finished 10th in the 4 × 100 m freestyle with Zastrow, van den Hoogenband and van Velthoven. In the 50 m freestyle, his only individual start, he reached a 32nd spot.

== See also ==
- List of swimmers
- Dutch records in swimming
- European records in swimming

== Personal bests ==
Short course
Event	Time	Date	Location
50 m freestyle	21.72	2008-12-19	Amsterdam, Netherlands
100 m freestyle	47.42	2008-12-21	Amsterdam, Netherlands

Long course
Event	Time	Date	Location
50 m freestyle	22.40	2008-12-05	Eindhoven, Netherlands
100 m freestyle	49.71	2008-03-21	Eindhoven, Netherlands
