= Bastiaan Tamminga =

Dutch swimmer

Personal information
- Full name: Bastiaan Tamminga
- Nationality: Netherlands
- Born: June 9, 1981 (age 45) Delft
- Height: 1.98 m (6 ft 6 in)
- Weight: 94 kg (207 lb)

Sport
- Sport: Swimming
- Strokes: Backstroke, Butterfly, Freestyle
- Club: Nationaal Zweminstituut Eindhoven
Medal record
Men's swimming
Representing the Netherlands
European Championships (SC)
Bronze medal – third place	2007 Debrecen	4×50 m Medley

Bastiaan Tamminga (born June 9, 1981) is a former Dutch swimmer who specializes in the 50 m events of the backstroke, butterfly and freestyle. He trained by former world champion Marcel Wouda alongside olympic champions Maarten van der Weijden and Hinkelien Schreuder.

== Swimming career ==
Tamminga made his international debut at the European SC Championships 2001 in Antwerp. In the following years he appeared on many international tournaments especially in short course. At the European SC Championships 2007 in Debrecen, Hungary he won his only international medal, a bronze, in the 4×50 m medley relay alongside Nick Driebergen, Robin van Aggele and Mitja Zastrow.

=== 2008 ===
At the European Championships in March 2008 he finished 18th in the 50 m butterfly and 30th in the 100 m butterfly. In April he competed in the 2008 FINA Short Course World Championships and finished 10th in the 50 m butterfly, breaking the national record, and 21st in the 100 m. In the 4 × 100 m medley relay he swam a national record together with Robin van Aggele, Joeri Verlinden and Mitja Zastrow, finishing 8th in the final.

== Personal bests ==
Short course
Event	Time	Date	Location
50 m freestyle	21.77	2008-12-11	Rijeka, Croatia
100 m freestyle	48.28	2008-12-21	Amsterdam, Netherlands
50 m backstroke	24.88	2002-12-13	Riesa, Germany
50 m butterfly	NR 22.97	2008-12-21	Amsterdam, Netherlands
100 m butterfly	52.49	2007-12-22	Amsterdam, Netherlands

Long course
Event	Time	Date	Location
50 m freestyle	23.73	2008-06-05	Eindhoven, Netherlands
50 m backstroke	26.30	2002-07-31	Berlin, Germany
50 m butterfly	23.87	2008-12-06	Eindhoven, Netherlands
100 m butterfly	54.91	2007-12-07	Eindhoven, Netherlands
