= Joeri Verlinden =

Dutch swimmer

Personal information
- Nationality: Dutch
- Born: 22 January 1988 (age 38) Melick, Netherlands
- Height: 1.80 m (5 ft 11 in)
- Weight: 72 kg (159 lb)

Sport
- Sport: Swimming
- Strokes: Butterfly swimming & freestyle swimming
- Club: Nationaal Zweminstituut Amsterdam
Medal record
Men's swimming
Representing Netherlands
European Championships (LC)
Silver medal – second place	2010 Budapest	100 m butterfly
Bronze medal – third place	2010 Budapest	4×100 m medley
European Championships (SC)
Gold medal – first place	2017 Copenhagen	4×50 m mixed medley
Silver medal – second place	2010 Eindhoven	100 m butterfly
Silver medal – second place	2019 Glasgow	4×50 m mixed medley
Bronze medal – third place	2010 Eindhoven	50 m butterfly
Bronze medal – third place	2012 Chartres	200 m butterfly

Joeri Verlinden (born 22 January 1988) is a Dutch swimmer who specializes in butterfly and freestyle. He is currently trained by Martin Truijens. He was previously trained by Marcel Wouda.

== Swimming career ==
Verlinden made his international debut at the European Short Course Swimming Championships 2006 in Helsinki where he started in all butterfly events finishing 34th in the 50 m, 32nd in the 100 m and 27th in the 200 m butterfly. At the 2007 Dutch Open Swim Cup he qualified for the European LC Championships in his hometown Eindhoven.

At the European Championships in March 2008 he ended 16th in the 50 m butterfly and 11th in the 100 m butterfly, he missed out for the 2008 Summer Olympics by 0.23 seconds. In the 200 m butterfly he ended 21st. In April he competed in the 2008 FINA Short Course World Championships and finished ex-aequo 17th in the 50 m butterfly and 16th in the 100 m. In the 4 × 100 m medley relay he swam a national record together with Bastiaan Tamminga, Robin van Aggele and Mitja Zastrow finishing 8th in the final.

Verlinden qualified for the 2016 Summer Olympics in Rio de Janeiro in the 100 meter butterfly.

== Personal bests ==
Short course
Event	Time	Date	Location
50 m butterfly	22.75	13 December 2009	Istanbul, Turkey
100 m butterfly	NR 49.86	10 December 2010	Istanbul, Turkey
200 m butterfly	NR 1:51.36	12 December 2010	Istanbul, Turkey
100 m freestyle	49.31	2008-12-21	Amsterdam, Netherlands
200 m freestyle	1:46.83	25 October 2009	Aachen, Germany

Long course
Event	Time	Date	Location
50 m butterfly	NR 23.63	10 April 2014	Eindhoven, Netherlands
100 m butterfly	NR 51.75	2 August 2012	London, United Kingdom
200 m butterfly	NR 1:56.59	28 July 2009	Rome, Italy
100 m freestyle	50.75	2012-12-13	Eindhoven, Netherlands
200 m freestyle	1:50.92	2009-03-21	Eindhoven, Netherlands
