= Van Velthoven =

van Velthoven or Vanvelthoven is a surname. Notable people with the surname include:

- Bas van Velthoven (born 1985), Dutch swimmer
- Jaak van Velthoven (born 1951), Belgian motorcycle racer
- Peter Vanvelthoven (born 1962), Belgian politician
