= Alexander Martynov (coach) =

Russian swimming coach

Alexander Bronislavovich Martynov
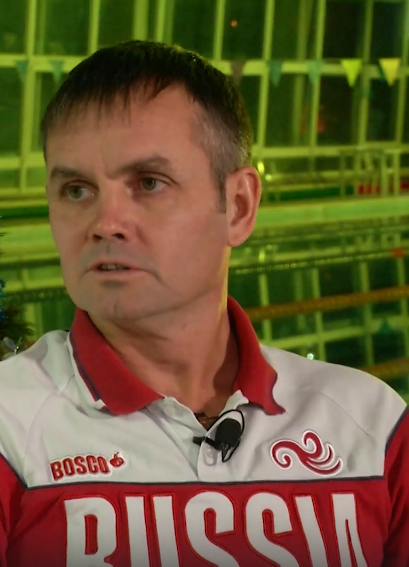
- Born: March 28, 1974 (age 52)
- Education: Novosibirsk State Pedagogical University
- Occupation: Swimming coach
- Known for: Coaching Sergey Geybel, Valentina Artemyeva, Nataliya Lovtsova, Daniil Markov, Arina Surkova
- Awards: Honored Coach of Russia

Alexander Bronislavovich Martynov (Russian: Александр Брониславович Мартынов;born March 28, 1974, Moscow) is a Russian swimming coach, Honored Coach of Russia. He has been a coach for the Russian national team since 2009.

== Biography ==
Alexander Bronislavovich Martynov is an Honored Coach of Russia in swimming and underwater sports. He was born on March 28, 1974. He has a higher pedagogical education, having graduated from Novosibirsk State Pedagogical University with a degree in "Physical Education Teacher."

Since 1995, he has worked as a coach in the swimming and underwater sports departments at the Novosibirsk Center for Higher Sportsmanship, as well as at the Sports School of Olympic Reserve "Center for Water Sports."

He has been a coach for the Russian national swimming team since 2009.

Over the years, he has trained five Honored Masters of Sports of Russia and Master of Sport of Russia, International Class.

Among his famous students are Sergey Geybel, Valentina Artemyeva, Nataliya Lovtsova, Daniil Markov, Arina Surkova.

== Notable students ==
- Sergey Geybel - Honored Master of Sports of Russia, five-time former world record holder, world champion, European champion, Universiade champion.
- Valentina Artemyeva - Honored Master of Sports of Russia, multiple world champion, European champion, Universiade champion, former world record holder, former European record holder.
- Arina Surkova - Honored Master of Sports of Russia, multiple world champion, European champion, former world and European record holder.

== Awards and achievements ==
- Honored Coach of Russia in swimming and underwater sports.
- Recognized as "Best Coach of the Year in Olympic Sports" and "Best Swimming Coach of 2016" in the Novosibirsk Oblast.
- His students are multiple winners and medalists of World Championships, European Championships, Universiades and Russia, world, continental and Russian record holders.

== Quote ==
A successful performance is a much greater test for an athlete than a failure. After a failure, you get upset and move on, but here the emotions are off the charts, the load is extreme, and you're constantly working above your limits.
In every training session, I try to get full concentration from the athletes. Sprinters can't go at half-strength; everything here has to be at maximum right away.
