= Dorothea Brandt =

German swimmer (born 1984)

Personal information
- National team: Germany
- Born: 5 March 1984 (age 42) Bremervörde, Lower Saxony, West Germany
- Height: 1.78 m (5 ft 10 in)
- Weight: 70 kg (154 lb)

Sport
- Sport: Swimming
- Strokes: Freestyle, breaststroke
- Club: SG Essen
- Coach: Nicole Endruschat
Medal record
Women's swimming
Representing Germany
World Championships (SC)
Bronze medal – third place	2014 Doha	50 m freestyle
European Championships (SC)
Gold medal – first place	2010 Eindhoven	50 m breaststroke
Gold medal – first place	2011 Szczecin	4×50 m medley
Silver medal – second place	2004 Vienna	4×50 m freestyle
Silver medal – second place	2004 Vienna	4×50 m medley
Silver medal – second place	2005 Trieste	4×50 m medley
Silver medal – second place	2007 Debrecen	4×50 m freestyle
Silver medal – second place	2010 Eindhoven	4×50 m freestyle
Silver medal – second place	2010 Eindhoven	4×50 m medley
Silver medal – second place	2011 Szczecin	50 m breaststroke
Silver medal – second place	2013 Herning	4×50 m mixed medley
Bronze medal – third place	2002 Riesa	4×50 m freestyle
Bronze medal – third place	2005 Trieste	4×50 m freestyle
Bronze medal – third place	2008 Rijeka	4×50 m freestyle
Bronze medal – third place	2009 Istanbul	50 m freestyle
Bronze medal – third place	2009 Istanbul	4×50 m freestyle
Universiade
Silver medal – second place	2009 Belgrade	50 m freestyle

Dorothea Brandt (born 5 March 1984) is a German swimmer, who specialized in sprint freestyle and breaststroke events. She is a multiple-time German champion, a fourteen-time medalist at the European Short Course Swimming Championships, and a semi-finalist in the 50 m freestyle at the 2004 Summer Olympics in Athens. Brandt currently holds the short-course German record time of 23.74 seconds in the same discipline.

== Swimming career ==
Brandt is a member of the swimming club SG Essen, in Essen Germany. She first appeared on the international scene, when she helped out the German team (led by Antje Buschschulte) to take the bronze medal in the medley relay at the 2002 European Short Course Swimming Championships in Riesa.

Two years later, Brandt qualified for the women's 50 m freestyle, along with Olympic veteran Sandra Völker, at the 2004 Summer Olympics in Athens, by attaining an A-standard entry time of 25.40 seconds from the German Olympic trials. Brandt, however, failed to advance into the final, as she recorded the slowest phase time of 25.83 seconds in the semi-finals.

Between 2004 and 2008, Brandt had won a total of seven medals (four silver and three bronze), as a member of the German team, in the women's freestyle and medley relays at the European Short Course Swimming Championships. At the 2009 Summer Universiade in Belgrade, Serbia, Brandt claimed her first ever silver medal in the 50 m freestyle, by seven-hundredths of a second (0.07) ahead of U.S. swimmer Michelle King, with a time of 25.03 seconds. On the same year, Brandt earned her second individual career medal, a bronze, in the same event at the European Short Course Swimming Championships in Istanbul, Turkey, with a time of 23.74 seconds. Moreover, she lowered Britta Steffen's short-course German record of 23.80, set in 2007, by a six-hundredth margin (0.06).

At the 2010 European Short Course Swimming Championships in Eindhoven, Netherlands, Brandt claimed her first title in the 50 m breaststroke by five hundredths of a second (0.05) behind second-place finisher Moniek Nijhuis of the Netherlands, with a time of 30.40 seconds. The following year, she captured a silver medal by eleven-hundredths of a second (0.11) behind Russia's Valentina Artemyeva in the same event at the European Short Course Swimming Championships, lowering her time to 30.17 seconds. Brandt also won a gold, as a member of the German swimming team, in the women's 4×50 m freestyle relay, clocking at 1:37.29.
