= Kolpashev Teachers' Institute =

- Колпашевский учительский институт
- Established: 1940
- Location: Kolpashevo, Tomsk Oblast, Russia
- Language: Russian

Kolpashevo State Teacher's Institute (Russian: Колпашевский учительский институт) is a higher educational institution in Kolpashevo, which existed from 1940 to 1956 to train teachers.

== History ==
On 22 June 1940, by the Decree of the Council of People's Commissars of the USSR and the order of the People's Commissariat of Education of the RSFSR, the Kolpashev State Teachers' Institute was established in the city of Kolpashevo on the basis of the Kolpashev Pedagogical School. On 1 September 1940, the educational process at the institute began. Two educational departments were created in the structure of the institute: language and literature and physics and mathematics. Fifty-three students were enrolled in the department of language and literature, and thirty students in the department of physics and mathematics. In total, one hundred and twenty people were recruited for the first year of the institute.

In 1941, during the beginning of the Great Patriotic War, the Kolpashev State Teachers' Institute was merged with the Novosibirsk State Pedagogical University, evacuated from Novosibirsk to the city of Kolpashevo. The teaching staff of the Kolpashev Institute included teachers from the Novosibirsk Institute, including Professor A.P. Dulzon.

Since 1943, after the Novosibirsk Pedagogical Institute was again sent to a permanent place of deployment in the city of Novosibirsk, the Kolpashevsky State Teachers' Institute again began to function as an independent institution of higher education. Three educational departments (faculties) were created in the structure of the institute: natural-geographical, physical-mathematical and language and literature, transformed in 1944 into historical-philological. In 1946, on the basis of the historical and philological department, two independent departments were created: historical and literary, thus four educational departments began to function in the structure of the institute.

On 1 September 1956, on the basis of the order of the Ministry of Education of the RSFSR No. 202, the Kolpashev State Teachers' Institute was closed. During its existence, more than a thousand teaching staff came out of its walls, working in the education system of the Tomsk region and the RSFSR.

== Famous graduates ==
- Lipatov, Vil Vladimirovich - writer, screenwriter and prose writer, journalist and special correspondent

== Literature ==
- Энциклопедия Томской области / Администрация Томской обл., Томский гос. ун-т; [науч. ред. Н. М. Дмитриенко]. - Томск : Изд-во Томского гос. ун-та, 2009. — ISBN 978-5-7511-1917-1
- Энциклопедия образования в Западной Сибири: в 3 т. / Ред. В. М. Лопаткин. - Барнаул : Алт. полиграф. комбинат, 2003. — ISBN 5-85458-068-3
- Нарымский край — моё Отечество : Материалы зональной научно-практической конференции, г. Колпашево, 27 июня 1997 г. / [ред. кол.: В. М. Кулемзин (отв. ред.) и др.]. — Томск : [Изд-во НТЛ], 1998. — 102 с.

== Sources ==
- "Колпашевский государственный учительский институт (1940—1956)". Государственный архив Томской области.
- "Исторический момент: рождение города Колпашево". vtomske.ru. 4 December 2014.
