= 2007 European Short Course Swimming Championships =

Water sport competitions

European Short Course Swimming Championships 2007
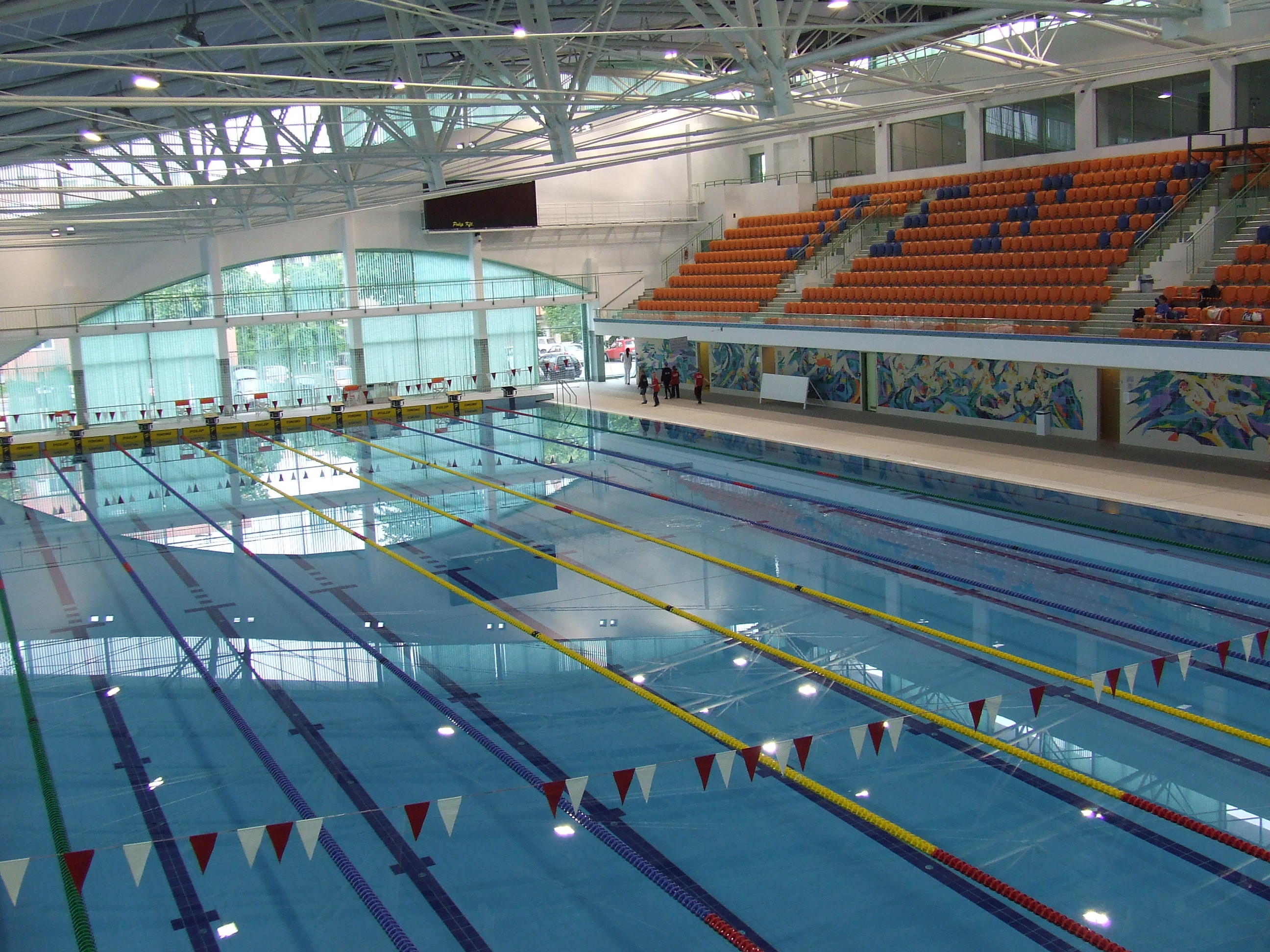
- Host city: Debrecen, Hungary
- Date: 13–16 December
- Venue: Debrecen Swimming Pool Complex
- Nations: 39
- Events: 38

The 2007 European Short Course Swimming Championships, which was the 15th edition of the continental swimming event, were held between 13 and 16 December 2007 in Debrecen, Hungary. The championships were swum in the Debrecen Swimming Pool Complex, in a short course (25-metre) pool.

== Participating nations ==
A total of 39 nations registered for the championship:

- Armenia
- Austria
- Belarus
- Belgium
- Bulgaria
- Croatia
- Cyprus
- Czech Republic
- Denmark
- Estonia
- Faroe Islands
- Finland
- France
- Germany
- United Kingdom
- Greece
- Hungary
- Iceland
- Ireland
- Israel
- Italy
- Latvia
- Lithuania
- Luxembourg
- (North Macedonia) Macedonia
- Montenegro
- Netherlands
- Norway
- Poland
- Portugal
- Russia
- Serbia
- Slovakia
- Slovenia
- Spain
- Sweden
- Switzerland
- Turkey
- Ukraine

== Events ==
The events were held over four days, divided into a morning session, when the preliminary heats were staged, and an evening session, when the semifinals and finals took place.

Date	Morning session Preliminary heats	Evening session Semifinals and Finals
Thursday; 13 December	Men's 50 m Freestyle; Women's 50 m Breaststroke; Men's 200 m Individual Medley; Women's 100 m Backstroke; Men's 200 m Backstroke; Men's 100 m Butterfly; Women's 200 m Butterfly; Men's 100 m Breaststroke; Women's 200 m Individual Medley; Men's 400 m Freestyle; Women's 100 m Freestyle; Men's 4 × 50 m Medley Relay	Men's 50 m Freestyle (semifinals); Women's 50 m Breaststroke (semifinals); Men's 400 m Freestyle (final); Men's 200 m Backstroke (final); Women's 100 m Backstroke (semifinals); Men's 100 m Butterfly (semifinals); Women's 200 m Individual Medley (final); Men's 100 m Breaststroke (semifinals); Women's 200 m Butterfly (final); Men's 200 m Individual Medley (final); Women's 100 m Freestyle (semifinals); Men's 50 m Freestyle (final); Women's 50 m Breaststroke (final); Men's 4 × 50 m Medley Relay (final)
Friday; 14 December	Men's 50 m Backstroke; Women's 50 m Butterfly; Men's 400 m Individual Medley; Women's 100 m Individual Medley; Women's 200 m Breaststroke; Men's 100 m Freestyle; Women's 4 × 50 m Freestyle; Women's 800 m Freestyle	Women's 800 m Freestyle (final); Men's 50 m Backstroke (semifinals); Women's 50 m Butterfly (semifinals); Men's 400 m Individual Medley (final); Women's 200 m Breaststroke (final); Men's 100 m Breaststroke (final); Women's 100 m Freestyle (final); Men's 100 m Freestyle (semifinals); Women's 100 m Backstroke (final); Men's 100 m Butterfly (final); Women's 100 m Individual Medley (semifinals); Women's 50 m Butterfly (final); Men's 50 m Backstroke (final); Women's 4 × 50 m Freestyle (final)
Saturday; 15 December	Women's 50 m Backstroke; Men's 50 m Breaststroke; Women's 400 m Freestyle; Men's 100 m Backstroke; Women's 100 m Breaststroke; Men's 100 m Individual Medley; Women's 100 m Butterfly; Men's 200 m Butterfly; Women's 4 × 50 m Medley Relay; Men's 1500 m Freestyle	Men's 1500 m Freestyle (final); Women's 50 m Backstroke (semifinals); Men's 50 m Breaststroke (semifinals); Women's 400 m Freestyle (final); Men's 100 m Individual Medley (semifinals); Women's 100 m Breaststroke (semifinals); Men's 100 m Backstroke (semifinals); Women's 100 m Individual Medley (final); Men's 200 m Butterfly (final); Women's 100 m Butterfly (semifinals); Men's 100 m Freestyle (final); Women's 50 m Backstroke (final); Men's 50 m Breaststroke (final); Women's 4 × 50 m Medley Relay (final)
Sunday; 16 December	Women's 50 m Freestyle; Men's 50 m Butterfly; Women's 400 m Individual Medley; Men's 200 m Breaststroke; Women's 200 m Freestyle; Men's 200 m Freestyle; Women's 200 m Backstroke; Men's 4 × 50 m Freestyle	Women's 50 m Freestyle (semifinals); Men's 50 m Butterfly (semifinals); Women's 400 m Individual Medley (final); Men's 200 m Breaststroke (final); Women's 200 m Freestyle (final); Men's 100 m Individual Medley (final); Women's 100 m Breaststroke (final); Men's 200 m Freestyle (final); Women's 100 m Butterfly (final); Men's 100 m Backstroke (final); Women's 200 m Backstroke (final); Men's 50 m Butterfly (final); Women's 50 m Freestyle (final); Men's 4 × 50 m Freestyle (final)

== Medal table ==
* Host nation (Hungary)

Rank	Nation	Gold	Silver	Bronze	Total
1	Germany (GER)	5	7	7	19
2	Russia (RUS)	5	4	3	12
3	France (FRA)	4	4	5	13
4	Hungary (HUN)*	4	2	3	9
5	Sweden (SWE)	4	2	2	8
6	Poland (POL)	3	3	2	8
7	Netherlands (NED)	3	2	3	8
8	Italy (ITA)	2	3	4	9
9	Slovenia (SLO)	2	0	1	3
9	Ukraine (UKR)	2	0	1	3
11	Serbia (SRB)	2	0	0	2
12	Austria (AUT)	1	3	1	5
13	Croatia (CRO)	1	3	0	4
14	Denmark (DEN)	1	0	0	1
14	Finland (FIN)	1	0	0	1
16	Spain (ESP)	0	2	2	4
17	Norway (NOR)	0	1	0	1
18	Bulgaria (BUL)	0	0	2	2
18	Greece (GRE)	0	0	2	2
Totals (19 entries)		40	36	38	114

== Medal summary ==
=== Men's events ===
Event	Gold		Silver		Bronze	
50 m freestyle	Stefan Nystrand; Sweden	21.11; CR	Duje Draganja; Croatia	21.23	Alain Bernard; France	21.57
100 m freestyle	Alain Bernard; France	46.39; CR	Stefan Nystrand; Sweden	46.73	Filippo Magnini; Italy	46.90
200 m freestyle	Filippo Magnini; Italy	1:43.50	Paul Biedermann; Germany	1:43.60	Paweł Korzeniowski; Poland	1:44.05
400 m freestyle	Paweł Korzeniowski; Poland	3:38.72	Paul Biedermann; Germany	3:38.76	Gergő Kis; Hungary	3:39.52
1500 m freestyle	Mateusz Sawrymowicz; Poland	14:24.54	Gergő Kis; Hungary	14:29.58	Federico Colbertaldo; Italy	14:31.31
50 m backstroke	Thomas Rupprath; Germany	23.43	Helge Meeuw; Germany	23.59	Aschwin Wildeboer Faber; Spain	23.75
100 m backstroke	Stanislav Donets; Russia	50.61; CR	Markus Rogan; Austria	51.12	Helge Meeuw; Germany	51.56
200 m backstroke	Markus Rogan; Austria	1:49.86; ER	Stanislav Donets; Russia	1:51.94	Aschwin Wildeboer Faber; Spain	1:52.12
50 m breaststroke	Oleg Lisogor; Ukraine	26.75	Aleksander Hetland; Norway	26.95	Alessandro Terrin; Italy	27.09
100 m breaststroke	Grigory Falko; Russia; Igor Borysik; Ukraine	58.57	none		Mihail Aleksandrov; Bulgaria	58.75
200 m breaststroke	Dániel Gyurta; Hungary	2:05.49; ER	Paolo Bossini; Italy	2:05.82	Mihail Aleksandrov; Bulgaria	2:06.91
50 m butterfly	Milorad Čavić; Serbia	22.89; CR	Evgeny Korotyshkin; Russia	22.90	Johannes Dietrich; Germany	22.94
100 m butterfly	Milorad Čavić; Serbia	50.53	Evgeny Korotyshkin; Russia	50.59	Peter Mankoč; Slovenia	50.62
200 m butterfly	László Cseh; Hungary	1:51.55	Paweł Korzeniowski; Poland	1:51.61	Ioannis Drymonakos; Greece	1:54.28
100 m individual medley	Peter Mankoč; Slovenia	52.88	Thomas Rupprath; Germany	53.46	Sergey Fesikov; Russia	54.12
200 m individual medley	László Cseh; Hungary	1:52.99; WR	Saša Imprić; Croatia	1:57.48	Alexander Tikhonov; Russia	1:57.59
400 m individual medley	László Cseh; Hungary	3:59.33; WR	Luca Marin; Italy	4:04.10	Ioannis Drymonakos; Greece	4:05.08
4 × 50 m freestyle relay	Sweden; Petter Stymne; Marcus Piehl; Per Nylin; Stefan Nystrand	1:24.19; WR	France; Antoine Galavtine; Alain Bernard; David Maître; Amaury Leveaux	1:24.98	Germany; Steffen Deibler; Stefan Herbst; Johannes Dietrich; Thomas Rupprath	1:26.46
4 × 50 m medley relay	Germany; Thomas Rupprath; Markus Deibler; Johannes Dietrich; Steffen Deibler	1:34.39	Russia; Stanislav Donets; Dmitry Komornikov; Evgeny Korotyshkin; Sergey Fesikov	1:34.99	Netherlands; Nick Driebergen; Robin van Aggele; Bastiaan Tamminga; Mitja Zastrow	1:35.35

=== Women's events ===
Event	Gold		Silver		Bronze	
50 m freestyle	Marleen Veldhuis; Netherlands	23.77	Britta Steffen; Germany	23.80	Hinkelien Schreuder; Netherlands	24.29
100 m freestyle	Britta Steffen; Germany	52.20; CR	Marleen Veldhuis; Netherlands	52.30	Josefin Lillhage; Sweden	52.84
200 m freestyle	Josefin Lillhage; Sweden	1:53.55; CR	Laure Manaudou; France	1:54.15	Coralie Balmy; France	1:54.43
400 m freestyle	Laure Manaudou; France	3:57.43	Federica Pellegrini; Italy	4:00.78	Ágnes Mutina; Hungary	4:02.35
800 m freestyle	Lotte Friis; Denmark	8:12.27	Erika Villaécija García; Spain	8:12.40	Alessia Filippi; Italy	8:12.84
50 m backstroke	Sanja Jovanović; Croatia	26.50; WR	Janine Pietsch; Germany	27.11	Fabienne Nadarajah; Austria	27.50
100 m backstroke	Laure Manaudou; France	57.34; ER	Sanja Jovanović; Croatia	57.94	Janine Pietsch; Germany	58.15
200 m backstroke	Anja Čarman; Slovenia	2:05.20	Esther Baron; France	2:05.57	Iryna Amshennikova; Ukraine	2:05.98
50 m breaststroke	Yuliya Yefimova; Russia; Janne Schäfer; Germany	30.33; CR	none		Sarah Poewe; Germany	30.80
100 m breaststroke	Yuliya Yefimova; Russia	1:04.95; ER	Mirna Jukić; Austria	1:06.57	Elena Bogomazova; Russia	1:06.72
200 m breaststroke	Yuliya Yefimova; Russia	2:19.08; ER	Mirna Jukić; Austria	2:20.92	Anne Poleska; Germany	2:22.66
50 m butterfly	Anna-Karin Kammerling; Sweden	25.70	Inge Dekker; Netherlands	25.74	Hinkelien Schreuder; Netherlands	25.90
100 m butterfly	Inge Dekker; Netherlands	56.82 =CR	Alena Popchanka; France	57.55	Otylia Jędrzejczak; Poland	58.40
200 m butterfly	Otylia Jędrzejczak; Poland	2:03.53; WR	Emese Kovács; Hungary	2:05.41	Annika Mehlhorn; Germany	2:06.53
100 m individual medley	Hanna-Maria Seppälä; Finland	1:00.23	Aleksandra Urbanczyk; Poland	1:00.53	Sophie de Ronchi; France	1:00.66
200 m individual medley	Camille Muffat; France	2:09.05	Katarzyna Baranowska; Poland	2:09.25	Evelyn Verrasztó; Hungary	2:09.83
400 m individual medley	Alessia Filippi; Italy	4:30.46	Mireia Belmonte García; Spain	4:31.06	Camille Muffat; France	4:31.38
4 × 50 m freestyle relay	Netherlands; Inge Dekker; Hinkelien Schreuder; Ranomi Kromowidjojo; Marleen Veldhuis	1:34.82; WR	Germany; Britta Steffen; Dorothea Brandt; Petra Dallmann; Meike Freitag	1:36.74	Sweden; Claire Hedenskog; Anna-Karin Kammerling; Josefin Lillhage; Magdalena Kuras	1:36.81
4 × 50 m medley relay	Germany; Janine Pietsch; Janne Schäfer; Annika Mehlhorn; Britta Steffen	1:46.67; WR	Sweden; Magdalena Kuras; Hanna Westrin; Anna-Karin Kammerling; Josefin Lillhage	1:48.07	France; Laure Manaudou; Anne-Sophie Le Paranthoën; Alena Popchanka; Malia Metella	1:48.39
