= Sophie de Ronchi =

French swimmer (born 1985)

Personal information
- Nationality: French
- Born: 24 September 1985 (age 41) Marseille, France
- Height: 1.76 m (5 ft 9 in)

Sport
- Sport: Swimming
- Strokes: Breaststroke
- Club: ES Massy Natation
Medal record
Short Course Europeans (25m)
Silver medal – second place	2008 Rijeka	100 m breaststroke
Silver medal – second place	2010 Eindhoven	100 m breaststroke
Bronze medal – third place	2007 Debrecen	100 m medley
Bronze medal – third place	2008 Rijeka	200 m medley

Sophie de Ronchi (born 24 September 1985 in Marseille) is an Olympic and National-Record holding breaststroke and medley swimmer from France. She swam for France at the 2008 Olympics.

At the 2009 French Championships in April, she bettered the French Records in the 50 m and 200 m breaststroke to 30.96 and 2:25.19.

== See also ==
- (in French) fr:Sophie de Ronchi — de Ronchi's entry on French Wikipedia.
- (in French) www.deronchi.com — de Rochi's website.
