= Bas van Velthoven =

Dutch swimmer

Personal information
- Born: 26 February 1985 (age 41) Hazerswoude-Rijndijk, South Holland, Netherlands
Medal record
Men's swimming
Representing the Netherlands
World Championships (SC)
Silver medal – second place	2008 Manchester	4×100 m freestyle
European Championships (LC)
Bronze medal – third place	2008 Eindhoven	4×100 m freestyle
European Championships (SC)
Bronze medal – third place	2006 Helsinki	4×50 m freestyle

Bas van Velthoven (born 26 February 1985 in Hazerswoude-Rijndijk) is a Dutch swimmer who specializes in freestyle. He is currently training in Amsterdam with Nick Driebergen, Femke Heemskerk and Chantal Groot with the coach Martin Truijens. He held the European record in the 4 × 100 m freestyle short course with Robert Lijesen, Mitja Zastrow and Robin van Aggele in 3:09.18. This record was set during the World SC Championships 2008 in Manchester where the Dutch team finished second behind the United States, who broke the world record in the same race. A few weeks before, at the 2008 European Aquatics Championships in Eindhoven, he won the bronze medal in the 4 × 100 m freestyle.

== See also ==
- List of swimmers
- List of Dutch records in swimming
