= Johannes Dietrich =

German swimmer

Personal information
- Born: 10 February 1985 (age 41) Berlin, Germany
- Weight: 99 kg (218 lb)

Sport
- Sport: Swimming
- Club: SC Wiesbaden 1911
Medal record
Representing Germany
European Championships (SC)
| Gold medal – first place | 2005 Trieste | 4×50 m medley |
| Gold medal – first place | 2007 Debrecen | 4×50 m medley |
| Bronze medal – third place | 2007 Debrecen | 50 m butterfly |
| Bronze medal – third place | 2007 Debrecen | 4×50 m freestyle |
| Silver medal – second place | 2008 Rijeka | 4×50 m medley |
| Gold medal – first place | 2009 Istanbul | 50 m butterfly |
| Silver medal – second place | 2009 Istanbul | 4×50 m medley |

Johannes Dietrich (born 10 February 1985) is a German swimmer who won seven medals at European Short Course Swimming Championships in 2005–2009.
