= 2010 European Short Course Swimming Championships =

Water sport competitions

- Host city: Eindhoven, Netherlands
- Date(s): 25–28 November 2010
- Venue(s): Eindhoven Zwemstadion
- Nations participating: 36
- Events: 38

The 2010 European Short Course Swimming Championships was held 25–28 November 2010 at Pieter van den Hoogenband Zwemstadion in Eindhoven, Netherlands. The meet featured competition amongst national teams from Europe, in 38 short course (25m) swimming events.

The competition featured a preliminary/semifinals/final format for the 50 and 100 events, a timed-final format (swimmers swim only once) in the 800/1500 freestyles, and prelims/final for all other events. Preliminary heats were swum in morning sessions; Semifinals and Finals in evening sessions.

Each nation was permitted to enter three swimmers into each individual event; with a maximum of 2 eligible to advance on to Semifinals/Finals.

== Participating nations ==
36 nations have announced their participation

- Armenia (1)
- Austria
- Belarus
- Belgium (15)
- Bulgaria
- Croatia
- Cyprus
- Czech Republic
- Denmark
- Estonia
- Finland
- France
- Germany
- Great Britain
- Greece
- Hungary (15)
- Iceland
- Ireland
- Israel
- Italy
- Liechtenstein (1)
- Lithuania (6)
- Luxembourg
- Montenegro
- Netherlands (26)
- Norway
- Portugal
- Russia
- Serbia
- Slovakia
- Slovenia
- Spain
- Switzerland
- Turkey
- Ukraine

== Results ==
=== Men's events ===
Event	Gold		Silver		Bronze	
50 m freestyle	Steffen Deibler; Germany	20.98	Marco Orsi; Italy	21.17	Andriy Hovorov; Ukraine	21.32
100 m freestyle	Danila Izotov; Russia	46.56	Yevgeny Lagunov; Russia	46.60	Luca Dotto; Italy	47.09
200 m freestyle	Danila Izotov; Russia	1:41.84	Paul Biedermann; Germany	1:42.94	Yevgeny Lagunov; Russia	1:44.11
400 m freestyle	Paul Biedermann; Germany	3:39.51	Federico Colbertaldo; Italy	3:41.70	Alexander Selin; Russia	3:43.70
1500 m freestyle	Federico Colbertaldo; Italy	14:35.36	Sergiy Frolov; Ukraine	14:42.01	Job Kienhuis; Netherlands	14:42.39
50 m backstroke	Stanislav Donets; Russia	22.74; ER	Vitaly Borisov; Russia	23.72	Nick Driebergen; Netherlands	23.73
100 m backstroke	Stanislav Donets; Russia	49.35	Damiano Lestingi; Italy	51.46	Artem Dubovskoy; Russia	51.90
200 m backstroke	Yannick Lebherz; Germany	1:51.74	Damiano Lestingi; Italy	1:51.84	Artem Dubovskoy; Russia	1:52.72
50 m breaststroke	Robin van Aggele; Netherlands	26.44	Aleksander Hetland; Norway	26.56	Hendrik Feldwehr; Germany; Fabio Scozzoli; Italy	26.68
100 m breaststroke	Fabio Scozzoli; Italy	57.78	Hendrik Feldwehr; Germany	58.09	Robin van Aggele; Netherlands	58.68
200 m breaststroke	Marco Koch; Germany	2:04.86	Melquiades Alvarez; Spain	2:05.41	Anton Lobanov; Russia	2:06.71
50 m butterfly	Steffen Deibler; Germany	22.34	Andriy Hovorov; Ukraine	22.74	Joeri Verlinden; Netherlands	23.23
100 m butterfly	Steffen Deibler; Germany	49.95	Joeri Verlinden; Netherlands	50.52	Peter Mankoč; Slovenia	50.92
200 m butterfly	Dinko Jukić; Austria	1:53.35	Tim Wallburger; Germany	1:53.71	Bence Biczó; Hungary	1:53.75
100 m individual medley	Markus Deibler; Germany	52.13	Peter Mankoč; Slovenia	52.87	Alan Cabello; Spain	53.24
200 m individual medley	Markus Deibler; Germany	1:53.25	Vytautas Janušaitis; Lithuania	1:54.07	Dinko Jukić; Austria	1:54.93
400 m individual medley	Dávid Verrasztó; Hungary	4:03.06	Yannick Lebherz; Germany	4:05.08	Federico Turrini; Italy	4:05.24
4 × 50 m freestyle relay	Italy; Luca Dotto; Lucio Spadaro; Filippo Magnini; Marco Orsi	1:25.16	Germany; Steffen Deibler; Markus Deibler; Stefan Herbst; Christoph Fildebrandt	1:25.19	Russia; Danila Izotov; Yevgeny Lagunov; Vitaly Syrnikov; Vladimir Bryukhov	1:25.81
4 × 50 m medley relay	Germany; Stefan Herbst; Hendrik Feldwehr; Steffen Deibler; Markus Deibler	1:33.40	Italy; Mirco di Tora; Fabio Scozzoli; Paolo Facchinelli; Marco Orsi	1:33.83	Russia; Stanislav Donets; Sergey Geybel; Nikolay Skvortsov; Danila Izotov	1:34.25

Legend: WR - World record; WBT - World best time; ER - European record; CR - Championship record

=== Women's events ===
Event	Gold		Silver		Bronze	
50 m freestyle	Ranomi Kromowidjojo; Netherlands	23.58	Hinkelien Schreuder; Netherlands	23.90	Britta Steffen; Germany	23.95
100 m freestyle	Ranomi Kromowidjojo; Netherlands	51.44	Femke Heemskerk; Netherlands	52.02	Britta Steffen; Germany	52.92
200 m freestyle	Femke Heemskerk; Netherlands	1:52.62	Silke Lippok; Germany	1:53.96	Evelyn Verrasztó; Hungary	1:54.39
400 m freestyle	Ágnes Mutina; Hungary	4:01.25	Melanie Costa; Spain	4:02.26	Gráinne Murphy; Ireland	4:02.86
800 m freestyle	Federica Pellegrini; Italy	8:15.20	Boglárka Kapás; Hungary	8:18.56	Gráinne Murphy; Ireland	8:19.45; NR
50 m backstroke	Sanja Jovanović; Croatia	27.10	Elena Gemo; Italy	27.13	Simona Baumrtová; Czech Republic	27.30
100 m backstroke	Daryna Zevina; Ukraine	57.57	Sharon van Rouwendaal; Netherlands	57.91	Duane Da Rocha; Spain	58.37
200 m backstroke	Duane Da Rocha; Spain	2:03.97	Sharon van Rouwendaal; Netherlands	2:04.13	Daryna Zevina; Ukraine	2:05.08
50 m breaststroke	Dorothea Brandt; Germany	30.40	Moniek Nijhuis; Netherlands	30.45	Valentina Artemyeva; Russia	30.55
100 m breaststroke	Moniek Nijhuis; Netherlands	1:06.20	Sophie De Ronchi; France	1:06.21	Tessa Brouwer; Netherlands	1:06.65
200 m breaststroke	Anastasia Chaun; Russia	2:22.68	Tanja Šmid; Slovenia	2:22.88	Chiara Boggiatto; Italy	2:24.52
50 m butterfly	Inge Dekker; Netherlands	25.38	Hinkelien Schreuder; Netherlands	25.49	Triin Aljand; Estonia	25.90
100 m butterfly	Inge Dekker; Netherlands	56.51	Ingvild Snildal; Norway	57.46	Caterina Giacchetti; Italy	58.17
200 m butterfly	Zsuzsanna Jakabos; Hungary	2:05.58	Alessia Polieri; Italy	2:06.18	Caterina Giacchetti; Italy	2:06.49
100 m individual medley	Evelyn Verrasztó; Hungary	59.53	Hinkelien Schreuder; Netherlands	59.57	Theresa Michalak; Germany	59.85
200 m individual medley	Evelyn Verrasztó; Hungary	2:07.06	Kimberly Buys; Belgium	2:10.14	Lara Grangeon; France	2:10.22
400 m individual medley	Zsuzsanna Jakabos; Hungary	4:29.78	Anja Klinar; Slovenia	4:30.83	Lara Grangeon; France	4:30.93
4 × 50 m freestyle relay	Netherlands; Inge Dekker; Femke Heemskerk; Hinkelien Schreuder; Ranomi Kromowidjojo	1:34.34	Germany; Dorothea Brandt; Britta Steffen; Lisa Vitting; Daniela Schreiber	1:36.83	Finland; Marlene Niemi; Emilia Pikkarainen; Lotta Nevalainen; Hanna-Maria Seppälä	1:39.02
4 × 50 m medley relay	Netherlands; Hinkelien Schreuder; Moniek Nijhuis; Inge Dekker; Ranomi Kromowidjojo	1:44.98	Germany; Jenny Mensing; Dorothea Brandt; Lisa Vitting; Britta Steffen	1:47.70	Italy; Laura Letrari; Lisa Fissneider; Elena Gemo; Federica Pellegrini	1:49.56

Legend: WR - World record; WBT - World best time; ER - European record; CR - Championship record

=== Medal table ===
* Host nation (Netherlands)

Rank	Nation	Gold	Silver	Bronze	Total
1	Germany (GER)	10	8	4	22
2	Netherlands (NED)*	9	8	5	22
3	Hungary (HUN)	6	1	2	9
4	Russia (RUS)	5	2	8	15
5	Italy (ITA)	4	7	7	18
6	Spain (ESP)	1	2	2	5
6	Ukraine (UKR)	1	2	2	5
8	Austria (AUT)	1	0	1	2
9	Croatia (CRO)	1	0	0	1
10	Slovenia (SLO)	0	3	1	4
11	Norway (NOR)	0	2	0	2
12	France (FRA)	0	1	2	3
13	Belgium (BEL)	0	1	0	1
13	Lithuania (LTU)	0	1	0	1
15	Ireland (IRL)	0	0	2	2
16	Czech Republic (CZE)	0	0	1	1
16	Estonia (EST)	0	0	1	1
16	Finland (FIN)	0	0	1	1
Totals (18 entries)		38	38	39	115

=== Records ===
The table below lists the World (WR), European (ER) and Championships (CR) records broken at the meet. Times displayed in shaded cells were subsequently broken later in the meet.

Date	Event	Heat/Semifinal/Final	Name(s)	Nation	Time	CR	ER	WR
26 November	Men's 50 m backstroke	Final	Stanislav Donets	Russia	22.74	check	check	

== See also ==
- 2010 in swimming
