= Robin van Aggele =

Dutch swimmer (born 1984)

Personal information
- Full name: Robin van Aggele
- National team: Netherlands
- Born: 30 July 1984 (age 41) Hilversum, Netherlands
- Height: 1.89 m (6 ft 2 in)
- Weight: 90 kg (198 lb)
- Spouse: Engaged
- Children: 1

Sport
- Sport: Swimming
- Strokes: Breaststroke, butterfly
- Club: AZ&PC
Medal record
World Championships (SC)
Silver medal – second place	2008 Manchester	4×100 m freestyle
European Championships (SC)
Gold medal – first place	2009 Istanbul	100 m breaststroke
Gold medal – first place	2010 Eindhoven	50 m breaststroke
Bronze medal – third place	2006 Helsinki	4×50 m freestyle
Bronze medal – third place	2007 Debrecen	4×50 m medley
Bronze medal – third place	2010 Eindhoven	100 m breaststroke

Robin van Aggele (born 30 July 1984 in Hilversum) is an Olympic and national-record-holding swimmer from the Netherlands and the most all-round Dutch swimmer since Marcel Wouda.

He was part of the Dutch relay team that set a short-course European Record in the 4×100 m Free Relay (3:09.18) at the 2008 Short Course Worlds, along with Robert Lijesen, Bas van Velthoven and Mitja Zastrow in 3:09.18. They finished second in this event, behind the team from the United States who set the World Record.

== Swimming career ==
Robin van Aggele made his international debut at the European SC Championships 2004 in Vienna. At the World LC Championships 2005 in Montreal he finished 14th in the 200 m individual medley and 11th in the 400 m individual medley. Later that year he finished 4th in the 100 m individual medley at the European SC Championships 2005 just 0.01 s behind Vytautas Janušaitis.

In 2006 van Aggele qualified for the European LC Championships 2006 but didn't start because he had trained to hard and was too tired to compete. In Helsinki he won his first international medal with the Dutch relay team in 4×50 m freestyle finishing 3rd. At the World LC Championships 2007 he reached a 10th place in the 50 m breaststroke as best result. At the national championships in June he nominated himself for the 200 m individual medley in Beijing 2008. At the end of the year he confirmed his nomination and qualified for the games at Dutch Open Swim Cup. One week later he won a bronze medal with the 4×50 m medley team at the European SC Championships 2007 in Debrecen.

=== Spring 2008 ===
In 2008 his first big tournament of the year was in his home country, the European LC Championships 2008 which was held in Eindhoven. After a disappointing start of the tournament, he came back strong breaking the 100 m butterfly national record of Joris Keizer bringing it to 52.20 and finishing 4th in the final. At the last day of the tournament he finished 4th again this time in the 4×100 medley relay together with Nick Driebergen, Thijs van Valkengoed and Mitja Zastrow swimming a national record in 3:37.00. A few weeks later he won a silver medal at the World SC Championships 2008 in Manchester with the 4×100 m freestyle team. He also reached 3 individual finals in the 50 and 100 m breaststroke and the 100 m individual medley.

=== 2008 Summer Olympics ===
The 2008 Summer Olympics were a big disappointment for van Aggele; he was eliminated in the heats of the 100 m butterfly, 200 m breaststroke and the 200 m individual medley. One month after the Games he announced to join Swimclub AZ&PC and started training under the guidance of Fedor Hes, who helped him already in his Beijing preparations.

== Personal bests ==
Short course
Event	Time	Date	Location
50 m butterfly	23.39	2008-12-21	Amsterdam, Netherlands
100 m butterfly	51.86	2008-10-19	Aachen, Germany
100 m freestyle	48.23	2006-12-17	Drachten, Netherlands
50 m breaststroke	NR 26.88	2008-04-13	Manchester, United Kingdom
100 m breaststroke	ER 56.29	2009-12-11	Istanbul, Turkey
100 m I.M.	NR 52.38	2008-12-14	Rijeka, Croatia
200 m I.M.	1:57.15	2008-12-19	Amsterdam, Netherlands

Long course
Event	Time	Date	Location
50 m butterfly	23.92	2008-12-06	Eindhoven, Netherlands
100 m butterfly	NR 52.20	2008-03-22	Eindhoven, Netherlands
50 m breaststroke	28.10	2007-03-27	Melbourne, Australia
100 m breaststroke	1:01.67	2008-12-07	Eindhoven, Netherlands
200 m breaststroke	NR 2:13.12	2006-04-21	Eindhoven, Netherlands
200 m I.M.	2:01.35	2007-06-01	Amsterdam, Netherlands

== See also ==
- List of swimmers
- List of European records in swimming
- List of Dutch records in swimming
- (in Dutch) nl:Robin van Aggele — his entry on Dutch Wikipedia
