= Katarzyna Baranowska =

Polish swimmer (born 1987)

Medal record

Women's swimming

Representing Poland

European Championships (LC)
Silver medal – second place	2006 Budapest	200 m medley
Bronze medal – third place	2006 Budapest	400 m medley

European Championships (SC)
Gold medal – first place	2005 Triest	200 m medley
Gold medal – first place	2005 Triest	400 m medley
Gold medal – first place	2006 Helsinki	200 m medley
Silver medal – second place	2006 Helsinki	400 m medley
Silver medal – second place	2007 Debrecen	200 m medley

Katarzyna ("Kasia") Baranowska (born 13 September 1987 in Szczecin, Poland) is an Olympic swimmer from Poland who specializes in the individual medley. She swam for Poland at the 2008 Summer Olympics.

At the 2008 Olympics, she set the Polish Records in the 200 and 400 IMs (2:12.13 and 4:36.95).

== See also ==
- List of European Short Course Swimming Championships medalists (women)
