= Sergey Geybel =

Russian swimmer (born 1981)

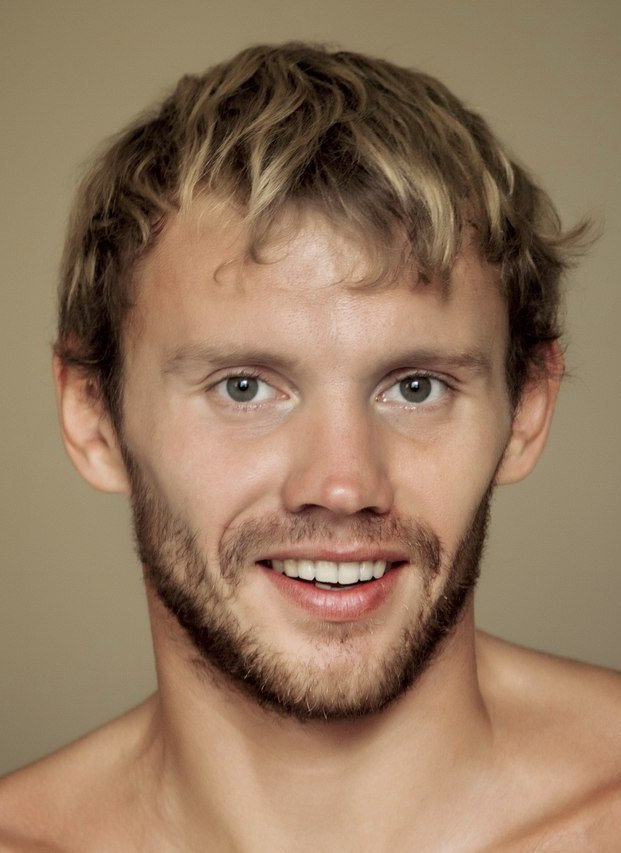

Personal information
- Full name: Sergey Geybel
- Nickname: Sergei Geibel
- National team: Russia
- Born: 25 October 1981 (age 44) Russia

Sport
- Sport: Swimming
- Strokes: Breaststroke
- Coach: Alexander Martynov
Medal record
Men's swimming
Representing Russia
Event	1st	2nd	3rd
World Championships (SC)	1	0	0
European Championships (SC)	0	2	1
Total	1	2	1
World Championships (SC)
Gold medal – first place	2008 Manchester	4×100 m medley
European Championships (SC)
Silver medal – second place	2008 Rijeka	4×50 m medley
Silver medal – second place	2011 Szczecin	4×50 m medley
Bronze medal – third place	2010 Eindhoven	4×50 m medley

Sergey Geybel (born 25 October 1981) is a competitive Russian swimmer specializing in breaststroke events. He is a former world record holder in the 4×100-metre medley relay and the 4×50-metre medley relay. He won a gold medal at the 2008 World Short Course Championships as part of the world-record-setting finals relay team in the 4×100-metre medley relay. He also won two silver medals and one bronze medal over the course of his career in the 4×50-metre medley relay at the European Short Course Championships.

== Career ==
=== 2006 European Short course Championships ===
At the 2006 European Short Course Swimming Championships in Helsinki, Finland, Geybel placed eleventh in the 50-metre breaststroke with a time of 27.65 seconds. In the 100-metre breaststroke he swam a time of 59.53 seconds in the final, placing sixth overall. He also swam the breaststroke leg of the 4×50-metre medley relay in the prelims and the final, splitting a 26.87 in the final to help the relay place fifth overall.

=== 2008 ===
==== 2008 World Short Course Championships ====
2008 World Short Course Championships
Gold medal – first place	4×100 m medley relay	3:24.29 (WR)

In April 2008, at the 2008 World Short Course Championships in Manchester, England, Geybel started competition in the 100-metre breaststroke where he placed thirteenth in the semifinals with a time of 59.48 seconds, just two spots behind Ryan Lochte of the United States, and did not advance to the final of the event. For his second event, Geybel ranked seventeenth in the prelims heats of the 50-metre breaststroke with a time of 27.57 seconds and did not advance to the semifinals. In his third and final event of the Championships, Geybel swam the breaststroke leg of the 4×100-metre medley relay, splitting a 57.93 in the final to help his relay teammates, Stanislav Donets (backstroke), Yevgeny Korotyshkin (butterfly), and Alexandr Sukhorukov (freestyle), win the gold medal and set a new world record, European record and Russian record in the event at 3:24.29, which broke the former world record set by the United States relay consisting of Aaron Peirsol, Brendan Hansen, Ian Crocker, and Jason Lezak, by eight tenths of a second.

==== 2008 European Short Course Championships ====
2008 European Championships
Silver medal – second place	4×50 m medley relay	1:33.31

Geybel won a silver medal in the 4×50-metre medley relay at the 2008 European Short Course Swimming Championships in Rijeka, Croatia, swimming in both the prelims and final of the event and helping the finals relay achieve a time of 1:33.31 in the final to earn the silver medal. In the 100-metre breaststroke he placed eleventh overall with a time of 58.90 seconds. He also competed in the 50-metre breaststroke, where he placed fourteenth in the semifinals with a time of 27.28 seconds that did not qualify him for the final.

=== 2009 Salnikov Cup ===
At the 2009 Vladimir Salnikov Swimming Cup in Saint Petersburg, Russia, Geybel helped set new world, European, and Russian records in the 4×100-metre medley relay at 3:19.16, swimming the breaststroke leg of the relay with a split of 56.43 seconds while Stanislav Donets swam backstroke, Yevgeny Korotyshkin swam butterfly, and Danila Izotov swam freestyle, to help topple the former record set by the United States relay team of Nick Thoman, Mark Gangloff, Michael Phelps, and Nathan Adrian.

=== 2010 European Short Course Championships ===
2010 European Championships
Bronze medal – third place	4×50 m medley relay	1:34.25

At the 2010 European Short Course Swimming Championships in Eindhoven, Netherlands in November, Geybel tied for ninth place overall with a time of 59.24 seconds in the 100-metre breaststroke. For his other individual event, the 50-metre breaststroke, he placed sixth in the final with a time of 26.98 seconds. In his one relay event of the Championships, the 4×50-metre medley relay, Geybel helped earn the bronze medal with a finals relay time of 1:34.25, splitting the breaststroke leg of the relay in 26.51 seconds.

=== 2011 European Short Course Championships ===
2011 European Championships
Silver medal – second place	4×50 m medley relay	1:33.86

In Szczecin, Poland, at the 2011 European Short Course Swimming Championships in December, Geybel ranked eighth overall in the prelims heats of the 100-metre breaststroke with a time of 58.90 seconds, though he did not advance to the semifinals as he was not one of the top two fastest Russians in the prelims heats for the event. Swimming the breaststroke leg of the 4×50-metre medley relay, he helped the finals relay achieve a time of 1:33.86 and earn the silver medal in the race, splitting a time of 26.47 seconds. Geybel was the highest ranking Russian in the final of the 50-metre breaststroke, placing seventh with a time of 26.84 seconds.

=== 2012 World Short Course Championships ===
At the 2012 World Short Course Championships in Istanbul, Turkey in December, Geybel competed in one event, the 50-metre breaststroke, where he placed eighth in the final with a time of 26.87 seconds, was the highest ranking Russian swimmer, and missed out on making the podium by 0.54 seconds to Florent Manaudou of France who captured the bronze medal in 26.33 seconds.

=== 2014 World Short Course Championships ===
At the 2014 World Short Course Championships in Doha, Qatar, Geybel swam in the prelims and the final of the 4×50-metre mixed medley relay, helping the finals relay achieve a fifth-place finish in a time of 1:38.93 by splitting a 26.20 for the breaststroke leg of the relay. Geybel split a 25.96 for the breaststroke leg of the 4×50-metre medley relay in the prelims heats, helping the prelims relay of him, Stanislav Donets (backstroke), Aleksandr Popkov (butterfly), and Evgeny Sedov (freestyle) set a new world record in the event at 1:32.78 and advance the relay to the final ranked first overall. The finals relay, which did not include Geybel, placed fourth and no relay members, prelims nor finals, won a medal in the event. In his individual event of the Championships, Geybel ranked eleventh overall and did not advance to the final of the 50-metre breaststroke with his time of 26.54 seconds.

=== 2015 World Masters Championships ===
On 13 August 2015, as part of the year's FINA World Masters Championships held at the Palace of Water Sports in Kazan, Russia, Geybel set a new masters world record in the long course 50-metre breaststroke for the 30—34 age group with a time of 28.24 seconds.

=== 2022–2023: Two times banned for being Russian ===
Following the 2022 Russian invasion of Ukraine in February 2022, Geybel was banned by LEN indefinitely from their competitions starting on 3 March and by FINA from their competitions effective at least from 21 April to 31 December 2022 as a means of keeping all Russians and Belarusians in-check by the international governing bodies (LEN - Europe; FINA - World). The times he and other Russians swam at other competitions during the year FINA did not count towards world records nor world rankings. An announcement was made in April 2023 by World Aquatics (FINA rebranded a few months before the announcement) of a back-acting extension of the 2022 FINA ban on Russians and Belarusians indefinitely.

== International championships (25 m) ==
Meet	50 breaststroke	100 breaststroke	200 breaststroke	4×50 medley relay	4×100 medley relay	4×50 mixed medley relay
EC 2006	11th	6th		5th	—N/a	—N/a
WC 2008	17th	13th		—N/a	1st place, gold medalist(s)	—N/a
EC 2008	14th	11th		2nd place, silver medalist(s)	—N/a	—N/a
EC 2009	8th	13th		1st place, gold medalist(s)	—N/a	—N/a
EC 2010	6th	9th		3rd place, bronze medalist(s)	—N/a	—N/a
EC 2011	7th	11th (h)	31st	2nd place, silver medalist(s)	—N/a	—N/a
WC 2012	8th			—N/a		—N/a
WC 2014	11th			4th^{[a]}		5th

^{a} Geybel swam only in the prelims heats.

== World records ==
=== Short course metres (25 m pool) ===
No.	Event	Time		Meet	Location	Date	Age	Status	Notes	Ref
1	4×100 m medley relay^{[a]}	3:24.29		2008 World Short Course Championships	Manchester, England	13 April 2008	26	Former	Former ER, NR	
2	4×100 m medley relay (2)^{[b]}	3:19.16		2009 Vladimir Salnikov Swimming Cup	Saint Petersburg, Russia	20 December 2009	28	Former	Former ER, NR	
3	4×50 m medley relay^{[c]}	1:32.78	h	2014 World Short Course Championships	Doha, Qatar	4 December 2014	33	Former	Former ER, NR	

Legend: ER – European record; NR – Russian record;
Records not set in finals: h – heat; sf – semifinal; r – relay 1st leg; rh – relay heat 1st leg; b – B final; † – en route to final mark; so – swim-off; tt – time trial

^{a} split 57.93 (breaststroke); with Stanislav Donets (backstroke), Yevgeny Korotyshkin (butterfly), Alexandr Sukhorukov (freestyle)
^{b} split 56.43 (breaststroke); with Stanislav Donets (backstroke), Yevgeny Korotyshkin (butterfly), Danila Izotov (freestyle)
^{c} split 25.96 (breaststroke); with Stanislav Donets (backstroke), Aleksandr Popkov (butterfly), Evgeny Sedov (freestyle)

== Masters world records ==
=== Long course metres (50 m pool) ===
No.	Event	Time	Meet	Location	Date	Age	Age Group	Ref
1	50 m breaststroke	28.24	2015 FINA World Masters Championships	Kazan, Russia	13 August 2015	33	30—34	

== Awards and honours ==
- Swimming World, Top 12 World Masters Swimmers of the Year: 2017

== See also ==
- List of world records in swimming
- World record progression 4 × 100 metres medley relay
- World record progression 4 × 50 metres medley relay
- List of World Swimming Championships (25 m) medalists (men)
- List of European Short Course Swimming Championships medalists (men)
