= Anastasia Chaun =

Russian swimmer

Personal information
- Full name: Anastasia Eduardovna Chaun
- Nationality: Russia
- Born: 11 September 1988 (age 37) Moscow

Sport
- Sport: Swimming
- Strokes: Breaststroke
- Club: Dynamo Sports Club
Medal record
Women's swimming
Representing Russia
European Championships (LC)
Gold medal – first place	2010 Budapest	200 m breaststroke
European Championships (SC)
Gold medal – first place	2010 Eindhoven	200 m breaststroke
Silver medal – second place	2011 Szczecin	200 m breaststroke

Anastasia Eduardovna Chaun (Russian: Анастасия Эдуардовна Чаун) (born 11 September 1988) is a Russian swimmer. In 2010, she won the 200 metres breaststroke at the 2010 European Aquatics Championships and the 2010 European Short Course Swimming Championships.
