= Inge Dekker =

Dutch swimmer (born 1985)

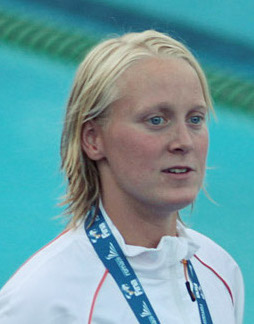

Personal information
- National team: Netherlands
- Born: 18 August 1985 (age 40) Assen, Netherlands
- Height: 1.83 m (6 ft 0 in)
- Weight: 67 kg (148 lb)
- Website: IngeDekker.com

Sport
- Sport: Swimming
- Strokes: Butterfly, freestyle
- Club: Nationaal Zweminstituut Eindhoven
Medal record
Women's swimming
Representing Netherlands
Event	1st	2nd	3rd
Olympic Games	1	1	1
World Championships (LC)	3	0	3
World Championships (SC)	7	0	2
European Championships (LC)	2	6	2
European Championships (SC)	15	6	3
Total	28	13	11
Olympic Games
Gold medal – first place	2008 Beijing	4×100 m freestyle
Silver medal – second place	2012 London	4×100 m freestyle
Bronze medal – third place	2004 Athens	4×100 m freestyle
World Championships (LC)
Gold medal – first place	2009 Rome	4×100 m freestyle
Gold medal – first place	2011 Shanghai	50 m butterfly
Gold medal – first place	2011 Shanghai	4×100 m freestyle
Bronze medal – third place	2007 Melbourne	50 m butterfly
Bronze medal – third place	2007 Melbourne	4×100 m freestyle
Bronze medal – third place	2013 Barcelona	4×100 m freestyle
World Championships (SC)
Gold medal – first place	2006 Shanghai	4×100 m freestyle
Gold medal – first place	2008 Manchester	4×100 m freestyle
Gold medal – first place	2008 Manchester	4×200 m freestyle
Gold medal – first place	2010 Dubai	4×100 m freestyle
Gold medal – first place	2014 Doha	4×50 m freestyle
Gold medal – first place	2014 Doha	4×100 m freestyle
Gold medal – first place	2014 Doha	4×200 m freestyle
Bronze medal – third place	2008 Manchester	50 m butterfly
Bronze medal – third place	2014 Doha	50 m butterfly
European Championships (LC)
Gold medal – first place	2006 Budapest	100 m butterfly
Gold medal – first place	2008 Eindhoven	4×100 m freestyle
Silver medal – second place	2004 Madrid	4×100 m freestyle
Silver medal – second place	2006 Budapest	4×100 m freestyle
Silver medal – second place	2008 Eindhoven	50 m butterfly
Silver medal – second place	2008 Eindhoven	100 m butterfly
Silver medal – second place	2014 Berlin	4×100 m mixed medley
Silver medal – second place	2014 Berlin	4×100 m freestyle
Bronze medal – third place	2008 Eindhoven	100 m freestyle
Bronze medal – third place	2008 Eindhoven	4×100 m medley
European Championships (SC)
Gold medal – first place	2004 Vienna	4×50 m freestyle
Gold medal – first place	2004 Vienna	4×50 m medley
Gold medal – first place	2005 Trieste	4×50 m freestyle
Gold medal – first place	2005 Trieste	4×50 m medley
Gold medal – first place	2007 Debrecen	100 m butterfly
Gold medal – first place	2007 Debrecen	4×50 m freestyle
Gold medal – first place	2008 Rijeka	4×50 m freestyle
Gold medal – first place	2009 Istanbul	100 m freestyle
Gold medal – first place	2009 Istanbul	50 m butterfly
Gold medal – first place	2009 Istanbul	100 m butterfly
Gold medal – first place	2009 Istanbul	4×50 m freestyle
Gold medal – first place	2009 Istanbul	4×50 m medley
Gold medal – first place	2010 Eindhoven	50 m butterfly
Gold medal – first place	2010 Eindhoven	100 m butterfly
Gold medal – first place	2015 Netanya	4×50 m medley
Silver medal – second place	2005 Trieste	50 m butterfly
Silver medal – second place	2006 Helsinki	50 m butterfly
Silver medal – second place	2006 Helsinki	100 m butterfly
Silver medal – second place	2006 Helsinki	4×50 m freestyle
Silver medal – second place	2007 Debrecen	50 m butterfly
Silver medal – second place	2015 Netanya	4×50 m freestyle
Bronze medal – third place	2013 Herning	50 m butterfly
Bronze medal – third place	2013 Herning	4×50 m mixed freestyle
Bronze medal – third place	2015 Netanya	4×50 m mixed freestyle

Inge Dekker (born 18 August 1985) is a Dutch former competitive swimmer who specialised in butterfly and freestyle events. She won the bronze medal with the Dutch women's 4×100-metre freestyle relay team at the 2004 Summer Olympics in Athens, alongside teammates Inge de Bruijn, Marleen Veldhuis and Chantal Groot. At the 2008 Summer Olympics in Beijing, Dekker became Olympic champion in the 4×100-metre freestyle together with Ranomi Kromowidjojo, Femke Heemskerk and Marleen Veldhuis, setting a then Olympic record. At the 2012 Summer Olympics, she was part of the Dutch 4 x 100 metre freestyle team that won the silver medal, with Veldhuis, Heemskerk and Kromowidjojo, behind the Australian team who set a new Olympic record.

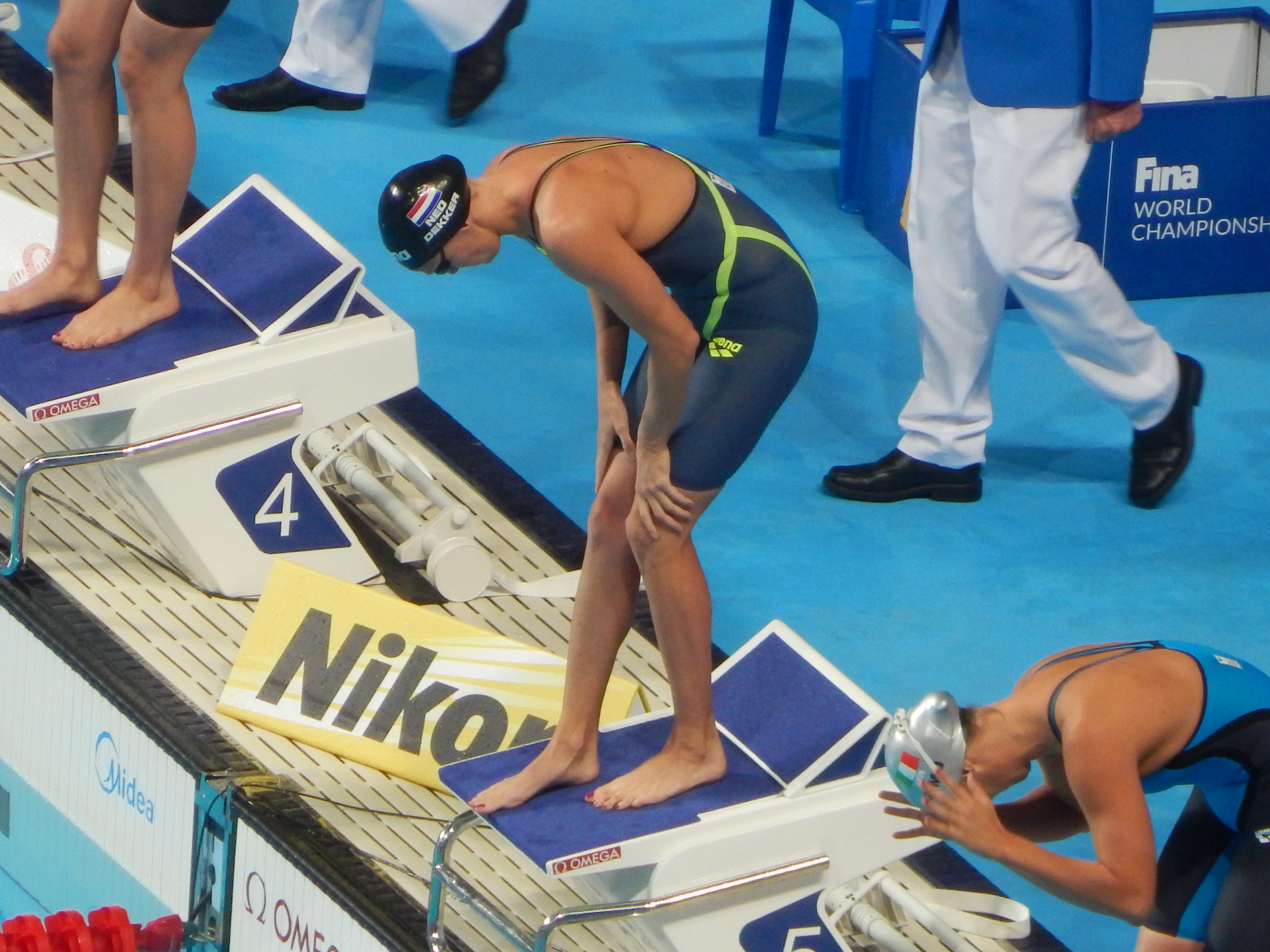
Dekker in 2015

== Personal life ==
Dekker's younger sister Lia was also a member of the Dutch national swimming team.

In February 2016, Dekker was diagnosed with cervical cancer. In March, she had a successful surgery and the Dutch Swimming Federation announced she continued to train for claiming a berth on the Dutch Olympic team. She made the Dutch swimming team for the 2016 Summer Olympics, which were her fourth Olympics.

== Personal bests ==
Short course
Event	Time	Date	Location
50 m freestyle	23.53	2009-12-11	Istanbul, Turkey
100 m freestyle	51.35	2009-12-11	Istanbul, Turkey
200 m freestyle	1:54.73	2014-12-03	Doha, Qatar
50 m butterfly	NR 24.59	2014-09-01	Dubai, United Arab Emirates
100 m butterfly	NR 55.74	2009-12-13	Istanbul, Turkey
200 m butterfly	2:09.98	2006-12-07	Helsinki, Finland

Long course
Event	Time	Date	Location
50 m freestyle	24.42	2012-03-16	Amsterdam, Netherlands
100 m freestyle	53.61	2009-07-26	Rome, Italy
200 m freestyle	1:57.00	2009-07-28	Rome, Italy
50 m butterfly	25.50	2014-06-15	Rome, Italy
100 m butterfly	57.32	2014-07-11	Dordrecht, Netherlands

== See also ==
- List of world records in swimming
- List of European records in swimming
- List of Dutch records in swimming
