= Paolo Bossini =

Italian swimmer (born 1985)

Personal information
- Full name: Paolo Bossini
- Nationality: Italy
- Born: 29 June 1985 (age 41) Villa Carcina, Brescia
- Height: 1.90 m (6 ft 3 in)

Sport
- Sport: Swimming
- Strokes: Breaststroke
- Club: Circolo Canottieri Aniene, Roma
Medal record
European Championships (LC)
Gold medal – first place	2004 Madrid	200 m breaststroke
Silver medal – second place	2006 Budapest	200 m breaststroke
European Championships (SC)
Gold medal – first place	2004 Vienna	200 m breaststroke
Silver medal – second place	2007 Debrecen	200 m breaststroke
Bronze medal – third place	2005 Trieste	200 m breaststroke
Bronze medal – third place	2006 Helsinki	200 m breaststroke
Mediterranean Games
Silver medal – second place	2005 Almería	200 m breaststroke

Paolo Bossini (born 29 June 1985 in Villa Carcina, Brescia) is an Italian breaststroke swimmer. He was European Champion in 2004, both short and long course, in 200 m breaststroke. He achieved the 4th place in the same distance in the 2004 Summer Olympics. He lives in Switzerland at the moment.

== See also ==
- Swimming at the 2004 Summer Olympics – Men's 200 metre breaststroke
- Swimming at the 2004 Summer Olympics – Men's 4 × 100 metre medley relay
- European SC Championships 2004
- European LC Championships 2004
- European SC Championships 2005
- 2006 European Championships in Aquatics
- European Short Course Swimming Championships 2006
