= Daria Deeva =

Russian swimmer (born 1990)

Personal information
- National team: Russia
- Born: September 2, 1990 (age 35) Sverdlovsk Oblast, Russia
- Height: 1.81 m (5 ft 11 in)

Sport
- Sport: Swimming
- Strokes: Breaststroke
Medal record
Women's swimming
Representing Russia
European Championships (SC)
Silver medal – second place	2011 Szczecin	4×50 m medley relay
Bronze medal – third place	2009 Istanbul	4×50 m medley relay
Bronze medal – third place	2011 Szczecin	50 m breaststroke
Bronze medal – third place	2011 Szczecin	100 m breaststroke
Summer Universiade
Gold medal – first place	2009 Belgrade	50 m breaststroke

Daria Deeva (born 2 September 1990, Nizhny Tagil) is a Russian swimmer. She competed for Russia at the 2012 Summer Olympics, in the women's 100 m breaststroke.
