= Yelena Bogomazova =

Russian swimmer (born 1982)

Personal information
- Born: 9 February 1982 (age 44) Leningrad, Russian SFSR, Soviet Union
- Height: 1.66 m (5 ft 5 in)
- Weight: 52 kg (115 lb)

Sport
- Sport: Swimming
- Club: Saint Petersburg Army
Medal record
Women's swimming
Representing Russia
World Championships (SC)
Bronze medal – third place	2000 Athens	100 m breaststroke
European Championships (LC)
Gold medal – first place	2006 Budapest	50 m breaststroke
Silver medal – second place	2004 Madrid	50 m breaststroke
Silver medal – second place	2004 Madrid	100 m breaststroke
Bronze medal – third place	2002 Berlin	50 m breaststroke
Bronze medal – third place	2002 Berlin	100 m breaststroke
Bronze medal – third place	2004 Madrid	200 m breaststroke
European Championships (SC)
Silver medal – second place	2003 Dublin	100 m breaststroke
Silver medal – second place	2004 Vienna	50 m breaststroke
Silver medal – second place	2005 Trieste	100 m breaststroke
Bronze medal – third place	2003 Dublin	50 m breaststroke
Bronze medal – third place	2005 Trieste	50 m breaststroke
Bronze medal – third place	2006 Helsinki	50 m breaststroke
Bronze medal – third place	2007 Debrecen	100 m breaststroke

Yelena Valeryevna Bogomazova (Russian: Елена Валерьевна Богомазова; born 9 February 1982) is a Russian swimmer.

== Career ==
She won 13 medals in breaststroke at the European Championships of 2002–2007 and a bronze medal at the 2000 FINA World Swimming Championships (25 m).

She also competed at the 2004 and 2008 Summer Olympics, but did not reach the finals.

She retired from swimming after the 2008 Olympics. Before that, she lived and trained in France and was planning to obtain a university degree there.
