= 2011 European Short Course Swimming Championships =

Water sport competitions

- Host city: Szczecin, Poland
- Date: 8–11 December
- Venue: Floating Arena
- Nations: 39
- Athletes: 543
- Events: 38

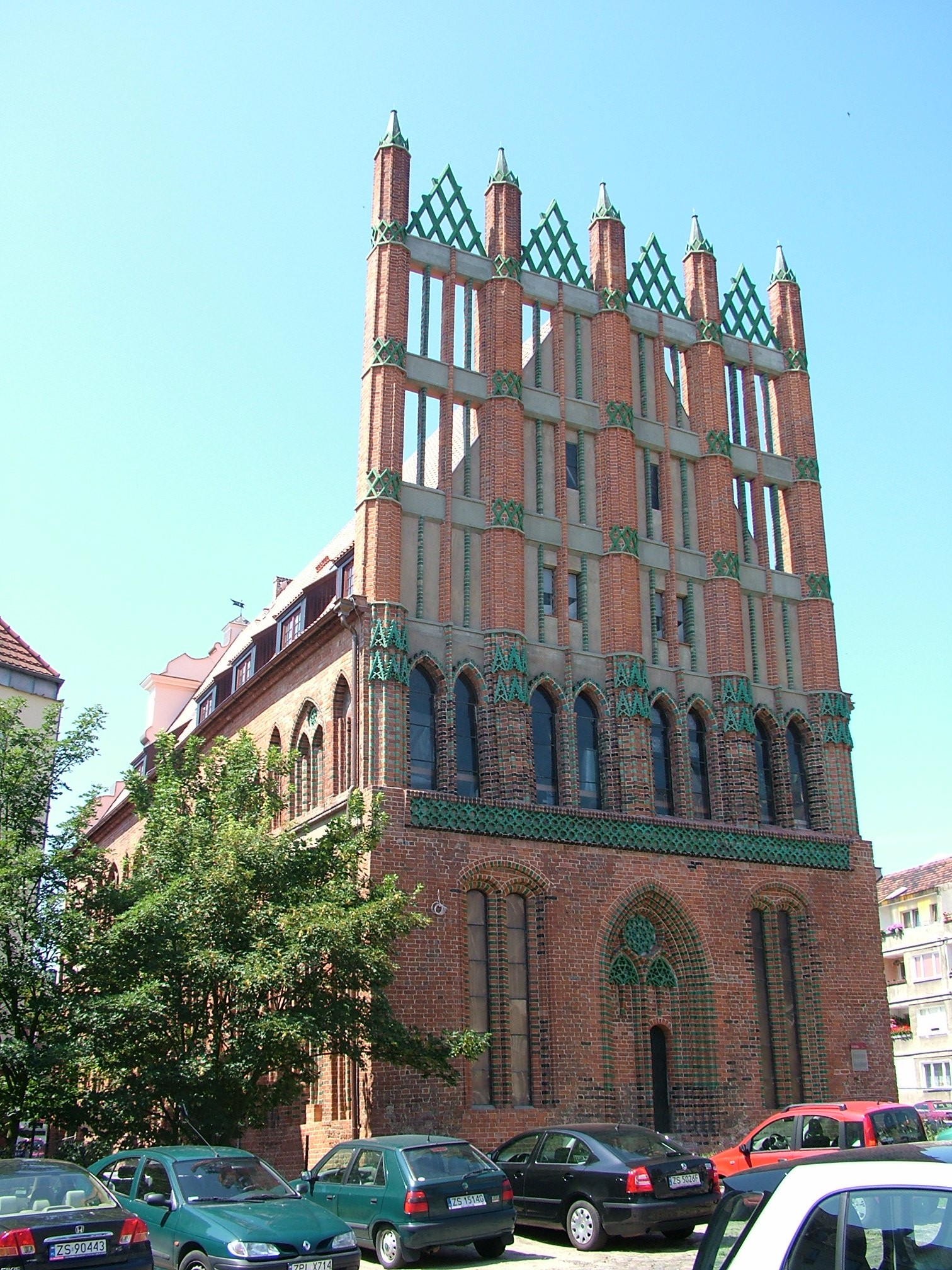
PolandSzczecinOldCityHall

The 2011 European Short Course Swimming Championships were held in Szczecin, Poland, from December 8 to 11, 2011. The event featured competition in a short course (25 m) pool.

The event was held over four days with heats, semifinals and a final for the 50 m and 100 m events and heats and a final for all other events with the exception of the women's 800 m and men's 1500 m freestyle which were heat-declared winners. Heats were held in the morning, with semifinals, finals and the fastest heat of the distance freestyle events in the evening.

Each nation was permitted to enter four swimmers into each individual event, however only the fastest two were allowed to progress to the semifinal and/or final.

== Participating nations ==
543 swimmers (302 males, 241 females) from 39 countries swam at the 2011 Short Course European Championships. Teams (and team size) were from:

- Austria (20)
- Azerbaijan (1)
- Belarus (13)
- Belgium (8)
- Bosnia and Herzegovina (4)
- Bulgaria (12)
- Croatia (12)
- Cyprus (2)
- Czech Republic (19)
- Denmark (15)
- Estonia (10)
- Faroe Islands (2)
- Finland (10)
- France (15)
- Germany (23)
- Great Britain (26)
- Greece (5)
- Hungary (22)
- Iceland (4)
- Ireland (11)
- Israel (13)
- Italy (38)
- Latvia (4)
- Liechtenstein (1)
- Lithuania (10)
- Luxembourg (4)
- Netherlands (24)
- Norway (13)
- Poland (45)
- Portugal (5)
- Russia (39)
- Serbia (6)
- Slovakia (11)
- Slovenia (14)
- Spain (14)
- Sweden (10)
- Switzerland (24)
- Turkey (16)
- Ukraine (19)

== Results ==
=== Men's events ===
Event	Gold		Silver		Bronze	
50 m freestyle	Konrad Czerniak; Poland	20.88 NR	Sergey Fesikov; Russia	20.95	Marco Orsi; Italy	21.01
100 m freestyle	Sergey Fesikov; Russia	46.56	Luca Dotto; Italy	46.89	Krisztián Takács; Hungary	47.46
200 m freestyle	Paul Biedermann; Germany	1:42.92	Filippo Magnini; Italy	1:43.20	László Cseh; Hungary	1:43.71
400 m freestyle	Paul Biedermann; Germany	3:38.65	Mads Glæsner; Denmark	3:39.30	Paweł Korzeniowski; Poland	3:40.54
1500 m freestyle	Mateusz Sawrymowicz; Poland	14:29.81	Mads Glæsner; Denmark	14:29.88	Sergiy Frolov; Ukraine	14:35.22 NR
50 m backstroke	Aschwin Wildeboer; Spain	23.43	Flori Lang; Switzerland	23.57 NR	Pavel Sankovich; Belarus	23.64 NR
100 m backstroke	Radosław Kawęcki; Poland	50.43 NR	Aschwin Wildeboer; Spain	50.61	Pavel Sankovich; Belarus	51.14 NR
200 m backstroke	Radosław Kawęcki; Poland	1:49.15	Aschwin Wildeboer; Spain	1:50.63	Péter Bernek; Hungary	1:51.21 NR
50 m breaststroke	Fabio Scozzoli; Italy	26.25	Damir Dugonjič; Slovenia	26.34 NR	Alexander Dale Oen; Norway	26.49
100 m breaststroke	Alexander Dale Oen; Norway	57.05	Damir Dugonjič; Slovenia	57.29 NR	Fabio Scozzoli; Italy	57.30
200 m breaststroke	Dániel Gyurta; Hungary	2:02.37	Vyacheslav Sinkevich; Russia	2:03.61	Michael Jamieson; Great Britain	2:03.77 NR
50 m butterfly	Andriy Govorov; Ukraine	22.70	Amaury Leveaux; France	22.74	Konrad Czerniak; Poland	22.77 NR
100 m butterfly	Konrad Czerniak; Poland	49.62 NR	Yevgeny Korotyshkin; Russia	49.88	Francois Heersbrandt; Belgium	50.44 NR
200 m butterfly	László Cseh; Hungary	1:50.87 NR	Nikolay Skvortsov; Russia	1:51.21	Joseph Roebuck; Great Britain	1:51.62
100 m individual medley	Peter Mankoč; Slovenia	52.70	Markus Deibler; Germany	53.04	Martti Aljand; Estonia	53.37 NR
200 m individual medley	László Cseh; Hungary	1:53.43	Markus Rogan; Austria	1:53.63	Gal Nevo; Israel	1:54.87
400 m individual medley	László Cseh; Hungary	4:01.68	Dávid Verrasztó; Hungary	4:03.03	Gal Nevo; Israel	4:04.49 NR
4 × 50 m freestyle relay	Italy; Luca Dotto; Marco Orsi; Federico Bocchia; Andrea Rolla	1:24.82	Russia; Sergey Fesikov; Yevgeny Lagunov; Andrey Grechin; Nikita Konovalov	1:25.11	Belgium; François Heersbrandt; Emmanuel Vanluchene; Louis Croenen; Jasper Aerents	1:25.83 NR
4 × 50 m medley relay	Italy; Mirco Di Tora; Fabio Scozzoli; Paolo Facchinelli; Marco Orsi	1:33.18	Russia; Vitaly Borisov; Sergey Geybel; Yevgeny Korotyshkin; Sergey Fesikov	1:33.86	Germany; Christian Diener; Erik Steinhagen; Steffen Deibler; Stefan Herbst	1:34.41

Legend: WR - World record; WBT - World best time; ER - European record; CR - Championship record; NR - National record

=== Women's events ===
Event	Gold		Silver		Bronze	
50 m freestyle	Britta Steffen; Germany	24.01	Jeanette Ottesen; Denmark	24.11 NR	Triin Aljand; Estonia	24.23
100 m freestyle	Britta Steffen; Germany	51.94	Jeanette Ottesen; Denmark	52.05	Amy Smith; Great Britain	52.77
200 m freestyle	Silke Lippok; Germany	1:54.08	Melanie Costa Schmid; Spain	1:54.31 NR	Evelyn Verrasztó; Hungary	1:54.55
400 m freestyle	Mireia Belmonte García; Spain	3:56.39 NR	Lotte Friis; Denmark	3:58.02 NR	Melanie Costa Schmid; Spain	4:00.30
800 m freestyle	Lotte Friis; Denmark	8:07.53	Erika Villaécija García; Spain	8:12.23	Melanie Costa Schmid; Spain	8:16.28
50 m backstroke	Anastasia Zuyeva; Russia	26.23 NR	Georgia Davies; Great Britain	26.93	Simona Baumrtová; Czech Republic	26.94 NR
100 m backstroke	Daryna Zevina; Ukraine	56.96 NR	Anastasia Zuyeva; Russia	57.12	Mie Nielsen; Denmark	57.57 NR
200 m backstroke	Daryna Zevina; Ukraine	2:02.25 CR, NR	Duane Da Rocha; Spain	2:03.32 NR	Melanie Nocher; Ireland	2:04.29 NR
50 m breaststroke	Valentina Artemyeva; Russia	30.06	Dorothea Brandt; Germany	30.17	Daria Deeva; Russia	30.63
100 m breaststroke	Valentina Artemyeva; Russia	1:05.19	Rikke Møller-Pedersen; Denmark	1:05.23	Daria Deeva; Russia	1:05.83
200 m breaststroke	Rikke Møller-Pedersen; Denmark	2:19.55	Anastasia Chaun; Russia	2:20.84	Fanny Lecluyse; Belgium	2:21.14 NR
50 m butterfly	Jeanette Ottesen; Denmark	24.92 CR, NR	Triin Aljand; Estonia	25.51	Sviatlana Khakhlova; Belarus	25.96 NR
100 m butterfly	Jeanette Ottesen; Denmark	56.22	Jemma Lowe; Great Britain	56.67	Ilaria Bianchi; Italy	57.42 NR
200 m butterfly	Mireia Belmonte García; Spain	2:03.37	Jemma Lowe; Great Britain	2:04.04	Jessica Dickons; Great Britain	2:04.80
100 m individual medley	Theresa Michalak; Germany	59.05 NR	Zsuzsanna Jakabos; Hungary	59.72	Mie Nielsen; Denmark	1:00.10
200 m individual medley	Mireia Belmonte García; Spain	2:07.06	Evelyn Verrasztó; Hungary	2:08.28	Hannah Miley; Great Britain	2:08.34
400 m individual medley	Mireia Belmonte García; Spain	4:24.55 CR	Hannah Miley; Great Britain	4:26.06	Zsuzsanna Jakabos; Hungary	4:27.86 NR
4 × 50 m freestyle relay	Germany; Britta Steffen; Dorothea Brandt; Paulina Schmiedel; Daniela Schreiber	1:37.29	Denmark; Mie Nielsen; Pernille Blume; Katrine Holm Soerensen; Jeanette Ottesen	1:37.63 NR	Italy; Erika Ferraioli; Erica Buratto; Federica Pellegrini; Laura Letrari	1:38.12 NR
4 × 50 m medley relay	Denmark; Mie Nielsen; Rikke Møller Pedersen; Jeanette Ottesen; Pernille Blume	1:46.48	Russia; Anastasia Zuyeva; Valentina Artemyeva; Irina Bespalova; Margarita Nesterova	1:47.08	Poland; Aleksandra Urbanczyk; Ewa Scieszko; Anna Dowgiert; Katarzyna Wilk	1:48.70 NR

Legend: WR - World record; WBT - World best time; ER - European record; CR - Championship record; NR - National record

=== Medal table ===
* Host nation (Poland)

Rank	Nation	Gold	Silver	Bronze	Total
1	Germany (GER)	7	2	1	10
2	Denmark (DEN)	5	7	2	14
3	Spain (ESP)	5	5	2	12
4	Poland (POL)*	5	0	3	8
5	Russia (RUS)	4	9	2	15
6	Hungary (HUN)	4	3	5	12
7	Italy (ITA)	3	2	4	9
8	Ukraine (UKR)	3	0	1	4
9	Slovenia (SLO)	1	2	0	3
10	Norway (NOR)	1	0	1	2
11	Great Britain (GBR)	0	4	5	9
12	Estonia (EST)	0	1	2	3
13	Austria (AUT)	0	1	0	1
13	France (FRA)	0	1	0	1
13	Switzerland (SUI)	0	1	0	1
16	Belarus (BLR)	0	0	3	3
16	Belgium (BEL)	0	0	3	3
18	Israel (ISR)	0	0	2	2
19	Czech Republic (CZE)	0	0	1	1
19	Ireland (IRL)	0	0	1	1
Totals (20 entries)		38	38	38	114
