= Janne Schäfer =

German swimmer

Personal information
- Born: May 28, 1981 (age 45) Henstedt-Ulzburg, West Germany

Sport
- Sport: Swimming
Medal record
Representing Germany
Women's swimming
World Championships (SC)
Silver medal – second place	2000 Athens	4×100 m medley
European Championships (LC)
Gold medal – first place	2008 Eindhoven	50m breaststroke
Bronze medal – third place	1999 Istanbul	50m breaststroke
European Championships (SC)
Gold medal – first place	2005 Trieste	50m breaststroke
Gold medal – first place	2006 Helsinki	50m breaststroke
Gold medal – first place	2007 Debrecen	50m breaststroke
Silver medal – second place	2001 Antwerp	50m breaststroke
Silver medal – second place	2008 Rijeka	50m breaststroke
Bronze medal – third place	2002 Riesa	50m breaststroke
Bronze medal – third place	2006 Helsinki	100m breaststroke
Bronze medal – third place	2009 Istanbul	50m breaststroke
Summer Universiade
Gold medal – first place	2007 Bangkok	50m breaststroke
Bronze medal – third place	2005 Izmir	50m breaststroke

Janne Schäfer (born 28 May 1981) is a former breaststroke swimmer from Germany. She is a three-time European short course champion, World silver medalist and Universiade champion.
