= Hanna-Maria Seppälä =

Finnish swimmer

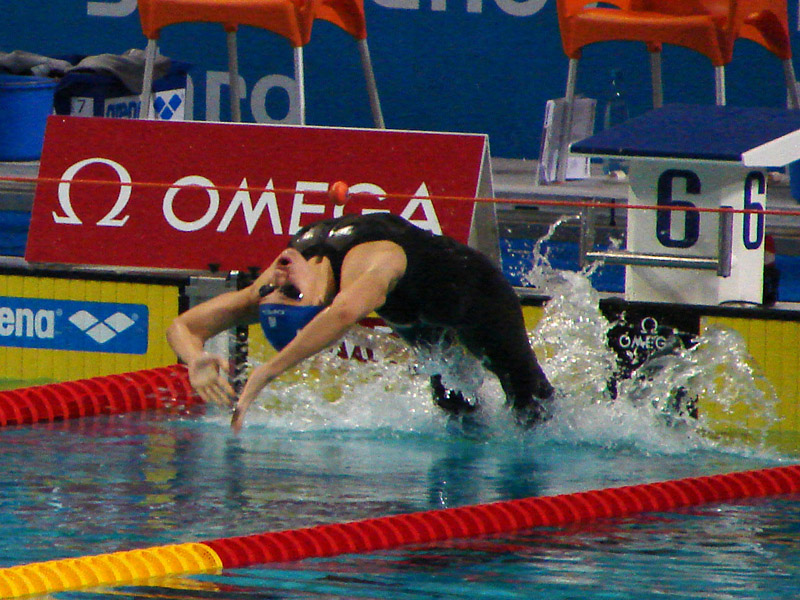
- Seppälä at the 2008 European Aquatics Championships in Eindhoven

Personal information
- Full name: Hanna-Maria Seppälä
- Nickname: Hanski
- Nationality: Finland
- Born: 13 December 1984 (age 41) Kerava, Finland
- Height: 1.75 m (5 ft 9 in)
- Weight: 68 kg (150 lb)

Sport
- Sport: Swimming
- Strokes: Freestyle, individual medley
- Club: Cetus
Medal record
World Championships (LC)
Gold medal – first place	2003 Barcelona	100 m freestyle
European Championships (LC)
Silver medal – second place	2008 Eindhoven	100 m freestyle
Bronze medal – third place	2016 London	4×100 m medley
World Championships (SC)
Silver medal – second place	2006 Shanghai	100 m ind. medley
Silver medal – second place	2008 Manchester	100 m ind. medley
Bronze medal – third place	2008 Manchester	100 m freestyle
European Championships (SC)
Gold medal – first place	2005 Trieste	100 m ind. medley
Gold medal – first place	2006 Helsinki	100 m ind. medley
Gold medal – first place	2007 Debrecen	100 m ind. medley
Gold medal – first place	2008 Rijeka	100 m ind. medley
Silver medal – second place	2005 Trieste	100 m freestyle
Silver medal – second place	2012 Chartres	4x50 m freestyle
Bronze medal – third place	2010 Eindhoven	4x50 m freestyle
Bronze medal – third place	2009 Istanbul	100 m ind. medley
Bronze medal – third place	2006 Helsinki	50 m freestyle
Bronze medal – third place	2003 Dublin	100 m freestyle
Bronze medal – third place	2012 Chartres	4×50 m mixed freestyle

Hanna-Maria Hintsa (née Seppälä born 13 December 1984) is a retired Finnish freestyle swimmer, who won the world title in the 100 m freestyle at the 2003 World Aquatics Championships in Barcelona, Spain.

Hintsa started swimming at age five and made the Finnish national junior team by age 10. In 1999 she won the bronze medal in the European Junior Championships in the 50 m freestyle event. To date she has broken 100 Finnish national records. Hintsa's manager was the now-defunct SportElite company.

== Achievements ==
Year	Tournament	Venue	Result	Time
1999	European Junior Championships	Moscow, Russia	third in 50 m freestyle fourth in 100 m freestyle	26.48; 57.69
2000	World SC Championships	Athens, Greece	eighth in 100 m individual medley	1:03.84
2000	European LC Championships	Helsinki, Finland	14th in 50 m freestyle 12th in 100 m freestyle	26.24; 56.72
2000	European Junior Championships	Dunkerque, France	first in 50 m freestyle first in 100 m freestyle	26.07; 56.69
2000	Olympic Games	Sydney, Australia	28th in 50 m freestyle 18th in 100 m freestyle	26.21; 56.68
2000	European SC Championships	Valencia, Spain	fifth in 100 m individual medley	1:02.63
2001	World LC Championships	Fukuoka, Japan	29th in 50 m freestyle 17th in 100 m freestyle	26.23; 56.39
2001	European SC Championships	Antwerp, Belgium	fifth in 50 m freestyle eighth in 100 m individual medley	25.04; 1:02.88
2002	European LC Championships	Berlin, Germany	14th in 50 m freestyle 11th in 100 m freestyle	26.03; 55.84
2002	European SC Championships	Riesa, Germany	sixth in 50 m freestyle eighth in 100 m individual medley	25.25; 1:03.13
2003	World LC Championships	Barcelona, Spain	10th in 50 m freestyle first in 100 m freestyle	25.39; 54.37
2003	European SC Championships	Dublin, Ireland	fifth in 50 m freestyle third in 100 m freestyle	24.79; 53.46
2004	World SC Championships	Indianapolis, United States	16th in 50 m freestyle fifth in 100 m freestyle fourth in 100 m individual medley 19th in 100 m backstroke	25.42; 54.39; 1:01.23; 1:03.13
2004	European LC Championships	Madrid, Spain	12th in 50 m freestyle seventh in 100 m freestyle 17th in 100 m backstroke 11th in 4 × 100 m freestyle 13th in 4 × 100 m medley	25.88; 55.36; 1:04.82; 3:57.40; 4:23.00
2004	Olympic Games	Athens, Greece	24th in 50 m freestyle 12th in 100 m freestyle	26.01; 55.59
2004	European SC Championships	Wien, Austria	10th in 50 m freestyle eighth in 100 m freestyle sixth in 100 m individual medley seventh in 4×50 m medley	25.34; 55.07; 1:02.23; 1:52.85
2005	World LC Championships	Montreal, Canada	14th in 50 m freestyle ninth in 100 m freestyle	25.70; 55.32
2005	European SC Championships	Trieste, Italy	fifth in 50 m freestyle second in 100 m freestyle first in 100 m individual medley	24.65; 53.36; 1:00.71
2006	World SC Championships	Shanghai, China	sixth in 50 m freestyle fourth in 100 m freestyle second in 100 m individual medley 20th in 50 m breaststroke	24.87; 53.78; 1:00.74; 32.67
2006	European LC Championships	Budapest, Hungary	15th in 50 m freestyle fifth in 100 m freestyle 26th in 50 m butterfly 31st in 100 m butterfly 12th in 4 × 100 m medley	25.66; 55.05; 27.74; 1:02.26; 4:20.79
2006	European SC Championships	Helsinki, Finland	third in 50 m freestyle fourth in 100 m freestyle first in 100 m individual medley seventh in 4×50 m medley	24.57; 53.29; 1:00.45; 1:50.99

== Private life ==
Hintsa met her partner first time in 2010. They have been married since January 2018.

Hintsa told in 2020 that she will start medical studies in Riika.

In autumn 2020 Hintsa started studies to become a doctor. She started studies in Latvia. Since then has moved her studies by apply to Italy.

Olympic Games
Preceded by Juha Hirvi	Flagbearer for Finland; 2012 London	Succeeded by Tuuli Petäjä-Sirén
