= Aleksandra Urbańczyk =

Polish swimmer

Personal information
- Full name: Aleksandra Urbańczyk-Olejarczyk
- National team: Poland
- Born: 13 November 1987 (age 38) Łódź, Poland
- Height: 1.72 m (5 ft 8 in)
- Weight: 64 kg (141 lb)

Sport
- Sport: Swimming
- Strokes: Freestyle, backstroke, individual medley
Medal record
Swimming
Representing Poland
World Championships (SC)
Bronze medal – third place	2012 Istanbul	50 m backstroke
European Championships (SC)
Gold medal – first place	2004 Vienna	100 m medley
Silver medal – second place	2004 Vienna	200 m medley
Silver medal – second place	2005 Trieste	200 m medley
Silver medal – second place	2007 Debrecen	100 m medley
Silver medal – second place	2013 Herning	50 m backstroke
Silver medal – second place	2015 Netanya	50 m backstroke
Bronze medal – third place	2006 Helsinki	200 m medley
Bronze medal – third place	2011 Szczecin	4×50 m medley

Aleksandra Urbańczyk-Olejarczyk (born 13 November 1987) is a Polish swimmer. She competed in the women's 4 × 100 metre freestyle relay event at the 2016 Summer Olympics.

== See also ==
- List of European Short Course Swimming Championships medalists (women)
