= Janine Pietsch =

German swimmer

Personal information
- Full name: Janine Pietsch
- Nationality: Germany
- Born: 30 June 1982 (age 44) Berlin, Germany
- Height: 1.88 m (6 ft 2 in)
- Weight: 79 kg (174 lb)

Sport
- Sport: Swimming
- Strokes: backstroke
- Club: SC Delphin Ingolstadt
Medal record
Women's swimming
Representing Germany
World Championships (SC)
Gold medal – first place	2006 Shanghai	50 m backstroke
Gold medal – first place	2006 Shanghai	100 m backstroke
European Championships (LC)
Gold medal – first place	2006 Budapest	50 m backstroke
Bronze medal – third place	2006 Budapest	100 m backstroke
European Championships (SC)
Gold medal – first place	2006 Helsinki	50 m backstroke
Gold medal – first place	2006 Helsinki	4x50 m medley
Gold medal – first place	2007 Debrecen	4x50 m medley
Silver medal – second place	2001 Antwerp	4x50 m medley
Silver medal – second place	2002 Riesa	4x50 m medley
Silver medal – second place	2003 Dublin	4x50 m medley
Silver medal – second place	2004 Vienna	4x50 m medley
Silver medal – second place	2004 Vienna	4x50 m medley
Silver medal – second place	2005 Trieste	50 m backstroke
Silver medal – second place	2005 Trieste	4x50 m medley
Silver medal – second place	2007 Debrecen	50 m backstroke
Bronze medal – third place	2001 Antwerp	4x50 m freestyle
Bronze medal – third place	2001 Antwerp	50 m backstroke
Bronze medal – third place	2001 Antwerp	100 m backstroke
Bronze medal – third place	2002 Riesa	4x50 m freestyle
Bronze medal – third place	2002 Riesa	50 m backstroke
Bronze medal – third place	2005 Trieste	100 m backstroke
Bronze medal – third place	2007 Debrecen	100 m backstroke

Janine Pietsch (born 30 June 1982 in Berlin) is a German backstroke swimmer. In the course of her career, she competed at the 2004 Summer Olympics in Athens, won two gold medals on the short course at the 2006 FINA World Swimming Championships, and four European gold medals.

== Career ==
=== 2001–2005 ===
Pietsch's first success on an international stage was at the 2001 European Short Course Swimming Championships in Antwerp, where she won one silver medal, in the 4x50m medley and three bronze medals, in the 50m backstroke, 100m backstroke, and 4 × 100 m freestyle relay. She would win another silver and two more bronze medals the next year in 2002. Between 2003 and 2005 she would win a further five silvers and one bronze in three European short course championships. In 2004, she competed in her only Olympic race, the 100 m backstroke. She finished seventh in her heat, and 23rd overall.

=== 2006–2007 ===
2006 was the best year of her career. In April she competed in Shanghai at the 2006 FINA World Swimming Championships, where she won two gold medals, the 50m backstroke, and the 100m backstroke. She won both gold medals by exactly a quarter of a second over second place.

In Budapest at the long-course 2006 European Aquatics Championships in late Summer, she won a gold medal in the 50m backstroke, and a bronze in the 100m backstroke. That December in Helsinki at the 2006 short-course European championships, she won two more gold medals, in the 50 m backstroke and 4x50m medley. In her last international success to date, at the 2007 short-course European championships she won gold in the 4x50m relay, silver in the 50m backstroke, and bronze in the 100m backstroke.

== Semi-retirement and personal life ==
In 2008, Pietsch was diagnosed with breast cancer, and did not compete at the 2008 Summer Olympics as a result. However, she has not ruled out trying to qualify for the 2012 London Olympics. In 2010, she became a patron of the St. Mary's Hospital in Stuttgart.

== See also ==
- World record progression 50 metres backstroke
