= 2005 European Short Course Swimming Championships =

Water sport competitions

2005 European Short Course Swimming Championship
- Host city: Trieste, Italy
- Date: 8–11 December 2005

The European Short Course Championships 2005 were held in Trieste, Italy, from 8–11 December.

== Medal table ==
* Host nation (Italy)

Rank	Nation	Gold	Silver	Bronze	Total
1	Germany (GER)	5	4	7	16
2	Poland (POL)	5	4	2	11
3	Netherlands (NED)	5	1	2	8
4	Hungary (HUN)	4	0	1	5
5	Italy (ITA)*	3	4	6	13
6	France (FRA)	3	3	2	8
7	Sweden (SWE)	3	2	3	8
8	Ukraine (UKR)	3	2	1	6
9	Russia (RUS)	2	8	4	14
10	Great Britain (GBR)	1	3	4	8
11	Denmark (DEN)	1	3	0	4
12	Finland (FIN)	1	1	1	3
13	Slovenia (SLO)	1	0	2	3
14	Austria (AUT)	1	0	1	2
15	Slovakia (SVK)	1	0	0	1
16	Lithuania (LTU)	0	1	1	2
17	Greece (GRE)	0	1	0	1
18	Belarus (BLR)	0	0	1	1
18	Croatia (CRO)	0	0	1	1
18	Switzerland (SUI)	0	0	1	1
Totals (20 entries)		39	37	40	116

== Men's events ==
=== 50 m freestyle ===
RANK	FINAL	COUNTRY	TIME
1st place, gold medalist(s)	Mark Foster	(United Kingdom) GBR	21.27
2nd place, silver medalist(s)	Frédérick Bousquet	(France) FRA	21.47
3rd place, bronze medalist(s)	Johan Kenkhuis	(Netherlands) NED	21.51

=== 100 m freestyle ===
RANK	FINAL	COUNTRY	TIME
1st place, gold medalist(s)	Filippo Magnini	(Italy) ITA	46.52 ER
2nd place, silver medalist(s)	Steffen Deibler	(Germany) GER	47.43
3rd place, bronze medalist(s)	Evgeny Lagunov	(Russia) RUS	47.55

=== 200 m freestyle ===
RANK	FINAL	COUNTRY	TIME
1st place, gold medalist(s)	Filippo Magnini	(Italy) ITA	1:42.89
2nd place, silver medalist(s)	Massimiliano Rosolino	(Italy) ITA	1:43.32
3rd place, bronze medalist(s)	Ross Davenport	(United Kingdom) GBR	1:43.93

=== 400 m freestyle ===
RANK	FINAL	COUNTRY	TIME
1st place, gold medalist(s)	Yuri Prilukov	(Russia) RUS	3:37.81 ER
2nd place, silver medalist(s)	Paweł Korzeniowski	(Poland) POL	3:38.20
3rd place, bronze medalist(s)	Paul Biedermann	(Germany) GER	3:39.88

=== 1500 m freestyle ===
RANK	FINAL	COUNTRY	TIME
1st place, gold medalist(s)	Yuri Prilukov	(Russia) RUS	14:27.12 ER
2nd place, silver medalist(s)	David Davies	(United Kingdom) GBR	14:35.94
3rd place, bronze medalist(s)	Mateusz Sawrymowicz	(Poland) POL	14:38.86

=== 50 m backstroke ===
RANK	FINAL	COUNTRY	TIME
1st place, gold medalist(s)	Thomas Rupprath	(Germany) GER	23.57
2nd place, silver medalist(s)	Arkady Vyatchanin	(Russia) RUS	23.95
3rd place, bronze medalist(s)	Liam Tancock	(United Kingdom) GBR	24.06

=== 100 m backstroke ===
RANK	FINAL	COUNTRY	TIME
1st place, gold medalist(s)	László Cseh	(Hungary) HUN	51.29
2nd place, silver medalist(s)	Arkady Vyatchanin	(Russia) RUS	51.47
3rd place, bronze medalist(s)	Thomas Rupprath	(Germany) GER	51.50

=== 200 m backstroke ===
RANK	FINAL	COUNTRY	TIME
1st place, gold medalist(s)	Markus Rogan	(Austria) AUT	1:50.43 WR
2nd place, silver medalist(s)	Arkady Vyatchanin	(Russia) RUS	1:50.77
3rd place, bronze medalist(s)	Gordan Kožulj	(Croatia) CRO	1:53.01

=== 50 m breaststroke ===
RANK	FINAL	COUNTRY	TIME
1st place, gold medalist(s)	Oleg Lisogor	(Ukraine) UKR	26.67
2nd place, silver medalist(s)	Alessandro Terrin	(Italy) ITA	26.79
3rd place, bronze medalist(s)	Matjaž Markič	(Slovenia) SLO	27.08

=== 100 m breaststroke ===
RANK	FINAL	COUNTRY	TIME
1st place, gold medalist(s)	Oleg Lisogor	(Ukraine) UKR	58.07
2nd place, silver medalist(s)	Romanos Alyfantis	(Greece) GRE	58.08
3rd place, bronze medalist(s)	Valeriy Dymo	(Ukraine) UKR	58.60

=== 200 m breaststroke ===
RANK	FINAL	COUNTRY	TIME
1st place, gold medalist(s)	Sławomir Kuczko	(Poland) POL	2:07.01
2nd place, silver medalist(s)	Grigory Falko	(Russia) RUS	2:07.04
3rd place, bronze medalist(s)	Paolo Bossini	(Italy) ITA	2:07.70

=== 50 m butterfly ===
RANK	FINAL	COUNTRY	TIME
1st place, gold medalist(s)	Lars Frölander	(Sweden) SWE	23.08
2nd place, silver medalist(s)	Mark Foster	(United Kingdom) GBR	23.12
3rd place, bronze medalist(s)	Matti Rajakylä	(Finland) FIN	23.17

=== 100 m butterfly ===
RANK	FINAL	COUNTRY	TIME
1st place, gold medalist(s)	Thomas Rupprath	(Germany) GER	50.55
2nd place, silver medalist(s)	Yevgeni Korotyshkin	(Russia) RUS	51.32
3rd place, bronze medalist(s)	Peter Mankoč	(Slovenia) SLO	51.47

=== 200 m butterfly ===
RANK	FINAL	COUNTRY	TIME
1st place, gold medalist(s)	Paweł Korzeniowski	(Poland) POL	1:50.89
2nd place, silver medalist(s)	Helge Meeuw	(Germany) GER	1:52.49
3rd place, bronze medalist(s)	Nikolay Skvortsov	(Russia) RUS	1:53.58

=== 100 m individual medley ===
RANK	FINAL	COUNTRY	TIME
1st place, gold medalist(s)	Peter Mankoč	(Slovenia) SLO	52.65
2nd place, silver medalist(s)	Oleg Lisogor	(Ukraine) UKR	53.38
3rd place, bronze medalist(s)	Vytautas Janušaitis	(Lithuania) LTU	54.16

=== 200 m individual medley ===
RANK	FINAL	COUNTRY	TIME
1st place, gold medalist(s)	László Cseh	(Hungary) HUN	1:53.46 WR
2nd place, silver medalist(s)	Vytautas Janušaitis	(Lithuania) LTU	1:55.52
3rd place, bronze medalist(s)	Alessio Boggiatto	(Italy) ITA	1:56.11

=== 400 m individual medley ===
RANK	FINAL	COUNTRY	TIME
1st place, gold medalist(s)	László Cseh	(Hungary) HUN	4:00.37 WR
2nd place, silver medalist(s)	Luca Marin	(Italy) ITA	4:02.88
3rd place, bronze medalist(s)	Alessio Boggiatto	(Italy) ITA	4:06.38

=== 4 × 50 m freestyle relay ===
RANK	FINAL	COUNTRY	TIME
1st place, gold medalist(s)	Mark Veens; Mitja Zastrow; Gijs Damen; Johan Kenkhuis	(Netherlands) NED	1:25.03 WR
2nd place, silver medalist(s)	Julien Sicot; David Maitre; Alain Bernard; Frédérick Bousquet	(France) FRA	1:25.40
3rd place, bronze medalist(s)	Mark Foster; Liam Tancock; Chris Cozens; Anthony Howard	(United Kingdom) GBR	1:25.85

=== 4 × 50 m medley relay ===
RANK	FINAL	COUNTRY	TIME
1st place, gold medalist(s)	Thomas Rupprath; Mark Warnecke; Johannes Dietrich; Steffen Deibler	(Germany) GER	1:34.83
2nd place, silver medalist(s)	Andriy Oleynyk; Oleg Lisogor; Sergiy Breus; Vyacheslav Shyrshov	(Ukraine) UKR	1:34.91
3rd place, bronze medalist(s)	Liam Tancock; Chris Cook; Matthew Clay; Mark Foster	(United Kingdom) GBR	1:35.22

== Women's events ==
=== 50 m freestyle ===
RANK	FINAL	COUNTRY	TIME
1st place, gold medalist(s)	Marleen Veldhuis	(Netherlands) NED	24.32
2nd place, silver medalist(s)	Cristina Chiuso	(Italy) ITA	24.37
3rd place, bronze medalist(s)	Anna-Karin Kammerling	(Sweden) SWE	24.52

=== 100 m freestyle ===
RANK	FINAL	COUNTRY	TIME
1st place, gold medalist(s)	Marleen Veldhuis	(Netherlands) NED	52.84
2nd place, silver medalist(s)	Hanna-Maria Seppälä	(Finland) FIN	53.36
3rd place, bronze medalist(s)	Petra Dallmann	(Germany) GER	53.56
3rd place, bronze medalist(s)	Alena Popchanka	(France) FRA	53.56

=== 200 m freestyle ===
RANK	FINAL	COUNTRY	TIME
1st place, gold medalist(s)	Josefin Lillhage	(Sweden) SWE	1:55.54
1st place, gold medalist(s)	Federica Pellegrini	(Italy) ITA	1:55.54
3rd place, bronze medalist(s)	Paulina Barzycka	(Poland) POL	1:55.97

=== 400 m freestyle ===
RANK	FINAL	COUNTRY	TIME
1st place, gold medalist(s)	Laure Manaudou	(France) FRA	3:56.79 WR
2nd place, silver medalist(s)	Joanne Jackson	(United Kingdom) GBR	4:01.12
3rd place, bronze medalist(s)	Federica Pellegrini	(Italy) ITA	4:02.81

=== 800 m freestyle ===
RANK	FINAL	COUNTRY	TIME
1st place, gold medalist(s)	Laure Manaudou	(France) FRA	8:11.25 WR
2nd place, silver medalist(s)	Anastasia Ivanenko	(Russia) RUS	8:14.51
3rd place, bronze medalist(s)	Flavia Rigamonti	(Switzerland) SUI	8:20.32

=== 50 m backstroke ===
RANK	FINAL	COUNTRY	TIME
1st place, gold medalist(s)	Louise Ørnstedt	(Denmark) DEN	27.26
2nd place, silver medalist(s)	Janine Pietsch	(Germany) GER	27.47
3rd place, bronze medalist(s)	Aleksandra Gerasimenya	(Belarus) BLR	27.59

=== 100 m backstroke ===
RANK	FINAL	COUNTRY	TIME
1st place, gold medalist(s)	Laure Manaudou	(France) FRA	58.12
2nd place, silver medalist(s)	Louise Ørnstedt	(Denmark) DEN	58.63
3rd place, bronze medalist(s)	Janine Pietsch	(Germany) GER	58.65

=== 200 m backstroke ===
RANK	FINAL	COUNTRY	TIME
1st place, gold medalist(s)	Irina Amshennikova	(Ukraine) UKR	2:05.12
2nd place, silver medalist(s)	Louise Ørnstedt	(Denmark) DEN	2:06.44
3rd place, bronze medalist(s)	Annika Liebs	(Germany) GER	2:06.73

=== 50 m breaststroke ===
RANK	FINAL	COUNTRY	TIME
1st place, gold medalist(s)	Janne Schaefer	(Germany) GER	30.62
2nd place, silver medalist(s)	Beata Kaminska	(Poland) POL	30.71
3rd place, bronze medalist(s)	Elena Bogomazova	(Russia) RUS	30.88

=== 100 m breaststroke ===
RANK	FINAL	COUNTRY	TIME
1st place, gold medalist(s)	Beata Kaminska	(Poland) POL	1:06.51
2nd place, silver medalist(s)	Elena Bogomazova	(Russia) RUS	1:06.89
3rd place, bronze medalist(s)	Simone Weiler	(Germany) GER	1:06.98
3rd place, bronze medalist(s)	Chiara Boggiatto	(Italy) ITA	1:06.98

=== 200 m breaststroke ===
RANK	FINAL	COUNTRY	TIME
1st place, gold medalist(s)	Anne Poleska	(Germany) GER	2:23.06
2nd place, silver medalist(s)	Katarzyna Dulian	(Poland) POL	2:23.24
3rd place, bronze medalist(s)	Chiara Boggiatto	(Italy) ITA	2:23.40

=== 50 m butterfly ===
RANK	FINAL	COUNTRY	TIME
1st place, gold medalist(s)	Anna-Karin Kammerling	(Sweden) SWE	26.05
2nd place, silver medalist(s)	Inge Dekker	(Netherlands) NED	26.20
3rd place, bronze medalist(s)	Fabienne Nadarajah	(Austria) AUT	26.32

=== 100 m butterfly ===
RANK	FINAL	COUNTRY	TIME
1st place, gold medalist(s)	Martina Moravcová	(Slovakia) SVK	58.19
2nd place, silver medalist(s)	Alena Popchanka	(France) FRA	58.27
3rd place, bronze medalist(s)	Johanna Sjöberg	(Sweden) SWE	58.39

=== 200 m butterfly ===
RANK	FINAL	COUNTRY	TIME
1st place, gold medalist(s)	Beatrix Boulsevicz	(Hungary) HUN	2:06.62
2nd place, silver medalist(s)	Mette Jacobsen	(Denmark) DEN	2:07.12
3rd place, bronze medalist(s)	Aurore Mongel	(France) FRA	2:07.52

=== 100 m individual medley ===
RANK	FINAL	COUNTRY	TIME
1st place, gold medalist(s)	Hanna-Maria Seppälä	(Finland) FIN	1:00.71
2nd place, silver medalist(s)	Hanna Eriksson	(Sweden) SWE	1:01.18
3rd place, bronze medalist(s)	Hinkelien Schreuder	(Netherlands) NED	1:01.21

=== 200 m individual medley ===
RANK	FINAL	COUNTRY	TIME
1st place, gold medalist(s)	Katarzyna Baranowska	(Poland) POL	2:10.25
2nd place, silver medalist(s)	Aleksandra Urbanczyk	(Poland) POL	2:11.11
3rd place, bronze medalist(s)	Daria Belyakina	(Russia) RUS	2:11.62

=== 400 m individual medley ===
RANK	FINAL	COUNTRY	TIME
1st place, gold medalist(s)	Katarzyna Baranowska	(Poland) POL	4:33.70
2nd place, silver medalist(s)	Anastasia Ivanenko	(Russia) RUS	4:35.27
3rd place, bronze medalist(s)	Zsuzsanna Jakabos	(Hungary) HUN	4:35.68

=== 4 × 50 m freestyle relay ===
RANK	FINAL	COUNTRY	TIME
1st place, gold medalist(s)	Hinkelien Schreuder; Inge Dekker; Chantal Groot; Marleen Veldhuis	(Netherlands) NED	1:36.27 WR
2nd place, silver medalist(s)	Johanna Sjöberg; Anna-Karin Kammerling; Josefin Lillhage; Therese Alshammar	(Sweden) SWE	1:36.75
3rd place, bronze medalist(s)	Dorothea Brandt; Daniela Samulski; Petra Dallmann; Daniela Götz	(Germany) GER	1:38.90

=== 4 × 50 m medley relay ===
RANK	FINAL	COUNTRY	TIME
1st place, gold medalist(s)	Hinkelien Schreuder; Moniek Nijhuis; Inge Dekker; Marleen Veldhuis	(Netherlands) NED	1:47.44 WR
2nd place, silver medalist(s)	Janine Pietsch; Janne Schaefer; Daniela Samulski; Dorothea Brandt	(Germany) GER	1:47.68
3rd place, bronze medalist(s)	Therese Alshammar; Rebecca Ejdervik; Anna-Karin Kammerling; Josefin Lillhage	(Sweden) SWE	1:49.07
