= Valentina Artemyeva =

Russian swimmer

Personal information
- Full name: Valentina Artemyeva
- Nationality: Russian
- Born: December 8, 1986 (age 39)

Sport
- Sport: Swimming
- Strokes: Breaststroke
- Club: Novosibirsk SC
- Coach: Alexander Martynov
Medal record
Women's swimming
Representing Russia
European Championships (SC)
Gold medal – first place	2008 Rijeka	50 m breaststroke
Gold medal – first place	2008 Rijeka	100 m breaststroke
Gold medal – first place	2011 Szczecin	50 m breaststroke
Gold medal – first place	2011 Szczecin	100 m breaststroke
Silver medal – second place	2011 Szczecin	4×50 m medley
Bronze medal – third place	2010 Eindhoven	50 m breaststroke
Summer Universiade
Bronze medal – third place	2011 Shenzhen	50 m breaststroke

Valentina Artemyeva is a Russian breaststroke swimmer. She is the former European champion in the 50m and 100m breaststroke (both short course). She is the world record holder (see World Finswimming Records) and a former World Champion in the 200m surface finswimming event, as well as a bronze medallist in the 100m Surface event.
