= 2008 FINA World Swimming Championships (25 m) =

Short Course Worlds
- Host city: Manchester, United Kingdom
- Date: 9–13 April 2008
- Venue: Manchester Arena

The 9th FINA Swimming World Championships (25 m) were held at the Manchester Arena, in Manchester, United Kingdom 9–13 April 2008.

The United States topped the medal table with 10 gold medals, though host team Great Britain took home the most medals (24).

== Medal summary ==
=== Key ===
- WR - World record
- ER - European record
- CR - Championship record

=== Men's events ===
| Event | Gold | | Silver | | Bronze | |
|---|---|---|---|---|---|---|
Freestyle
| Men's 50 m | Duje Draganja; Croatia | 20.81; WR | Mark Foster; Great Britain | 21.31 | Gerhard Zandberg; South Africa | 21.33 |
| Men's 100 m | Nathan Adrian; United States | 46.67; CR | Filippo Magnini; Italy | 46.70 | Duje Draganja; Croatia | 46.83 |
| Men's 200 m | Kenrick Monk; Australia | 1:43.46 | Kirk Palmer; Australia | 1:43.50 | Massimiliano Rosolino; Italy | 1:44.23 |
| Men's 400 m | Yury Prilukov; Russia | 3:37.35; ER | Massimiliano Rosolino; Italy | 3:39.60 | Robert Renwick; Great Britain | 3:40.22 |
| Men's 1500 m | Yury Prilukov; Russia | 14:22.98; CR | David Davies; Great Britain | 14:36.30 | Mateusz Sawrymowicz; Poland | 14:43.37 |
Backstroke
| Men's 50 m | Peter Marshall; United States | 23.49 | Liam Tancock; Great Britain | 23.53 | Ashley Delaney; Australia | 23.57 |
| Men's 100 m | Liam Tancock; Great Britain | 50.14; ER | Randall Bal; United States | 50.42 | Stanislav Donets; Russia | 50.53 |
| Men's 200 m | Markus Rogan; Austria | 1:47.84; WR | Ryan Lochte; United States | 1:47.91 | Stanislav Donets; Russia | 1:50.45 |
Breaststroke
| Men's 50 m | Oleg Lisogor; Ukraine | 26.46 | Mark Gangloff; United States | 26.54 | Cameron van der Burgh; South Africa | 26.67 |
| Men's 100 m | Igor Borysik; Ukraine | 57.74; CR | Cameron van der Burgh; South Africa | 57.92 | Oleg Lisogor; Ukraine | 58.08 |
| Men's 200 m | Kristopher Gilchrist; Great Britain | 2:06.18 | Igor Borysik; Ukraine | 2:06.21 | William Diering; South Africa | 2:06.85 |
Butterfly
| Men's 50 m | Adam Pine; Australia | 22.78 | Sergiy Breus; Ukraine | 22.86; ER | Evgeny Korotyshkin; Russia | 22.94 |
| Men's 100 m | Peter Mankoč; Slovenia | 50.04; CR | Adam Pine; Australia | 50.54 | Nikolay Skvortsov; Russia | 50.78 |
| Men's 200 m | Moss Burmester; New Zealand | 1:51.05; CR | Nikolay Skvortsov; Russia | 1:51.83 | Paweł Korzeniowski; Poland | 1:52.25 |
Individual medley
| Men's 100 m | Ryan Lochte; United States | 51.15; WR | Peter Mankoč; Slovenia | 52.21; ER | Liam Tancock; Great Britain | 52.22 |
| Men's 200 m | Ryan Lochte; United States | 1:51.56; WR | Liam Tancock; Great Britain | 1:53.10 | James Goddard; Great Britain | 1:55.15 |
| Men's 400 m | Ryan Lochte; United States | 4:03.21 | Robert Margalis; United States | 4:03.74 | Dinko Jukic; Austria | 4:06.40 |
Freestyle relay
| Men's 4 × 100 m | United States; Ryan Lochte; Bryan Lundquist; Nathan Adrian; Doug Van Wie | 3:08.44; WR | Netherlands; Robert Lijesen; Bas van Velthoven; Mitja Zastrow; Robin van Aggele | 3:09.18; ER | Sweden; Petter Stymne; Stefan Nystrand; Lars Frölander; Marcus Piehl | 3:10.04 |
| Men's 4 × 200 m | Australia; Kirk Palmer; Grant Brits; Nicholas Sprenger; Kenrick Monk | 6:55.65; CR | Great Britain; Robert Renwick; David Carry; Andrew Hunter; Ross Davenport | 6:56.52; ER | Italy; Emiliano Brembilla; Massimiliano Rosolino; Nicola Cassio; Filippo Magnini | 6:58.39 |
Medley relay
| Men's 4 × 100 m | Russia; Stanislav Donets; Sergey Geybel; Evgeny Korotyshkin; Alexander Sukhorukov | 3:24.29; WR | United States; Randall Bal; Mark Gangloff; Ryan Lochte; Nathan Adrian | 3:24.38 | New Zealand; Daniel Bell; Glenn Snyders; Corney Swanepoel; Cameron Gibson | 3:27.15 |

=== Women's events ===
| Event | Gold | | Silver | | Bronze | |
|---|---|---|---|---|---|---|
Freestyle
| Women's 50 m | Marleen Veldhuis; Netherlands | 23.25; WR | Hinkelien Schreuder; Netherlands | 23.83 | Francesca Halsall; Great Britain | 24.11 |
| Women's 100 m | Marleen Veldhuis; Netherlands | 52.17 =CR | Francesca Halsall; Great Britain | 52.79 | Hanna-Maria Seppälä; Finland | 52.94 |
| Women's 200 m | Kylie Palmer; Australia | 1:54.41 | Femke Heemskerk; Netherlands | 1:54.65 | Caitlin McClatchey; Great Britain | 1:55.15 |
| Women's 400 m | Kylie Palmer; Australia | 3:59.23; CR | Camelia Potec; Romania | 4:01.06 | Joanne Jackson; Great Britain | 4:01.11 |
| Women's 800 m | Rebecca Adlington; Great Britain | 8:08.25; ER, CR | Kylie Palmer; Australia | 8:12.32 | Erika Villaécija García; Spain | 8:13.93 |
Backstroke
| Women's 50 m | Sanja Jovanović; Croatia | 26.37; WR | Gao Chang; China | 26.70 | Kateryna Zubkova; Ukraine | 26.81 |
| Women's 100 m | Kirsty Coventry; Zimbabwe | 57.10; CR | Kateryna Zubkova; Ukraine | 57.15; ER | Sanja Jovanović; Croatia | 57.80 |
| Women's 200 m | Kirsty Coventry; Zimbabwe | 2:00.91; WR | Elizabeth Simmonds; Great Britain | 2:02.60; ER | Margaret Hoelzer; United States | 2:03.85 |
Breaststroke
| Women's 50 m | Jessica Hardy; United States | 29.58; WR | Kate Haywood; Great Britain; Sarah Katsoulis; Australia | 30.35 | | |
| Women's 100 m | Jessica Hardy; United States | 1:04.22; CR | Jade Edmistone; Australia | 1:04.93 | Suzaan van Biljon; South Africa | 1:05.38 |
| Women's 200 m | Suzaan van Biljon; South Africa | 2:18.73; CR | Sally Foster; Australia | 2:20.11 | Yuliya Yefimova; Russia | 2:20.48 |
Butterfly
| Women's 50 m | Felicity Galvez; Australia | 25.32; WR | Hinkelien Schreuder; Netherlands | 25.40 | Inge Dekker; Netherlands | 25.60 |
| Women's 100 m | Felicity Galvez; Australia | 55.89; WR | Rachel Komisarz; United States | 56.32 | Jemma Lowe; Great Britain | 56.84 |
| Women's 200 m | Mary Descenza; United States | 2:04.27; CR | Felicity Galvez; Australia | 2:04.90 | Jessica Dickons; Great Britain | 2:05.09 |
Individual medley
| Women's 100 m | Shayne Reese; Australia | 59.58 | Hanna-Maria Seppälä; Finland | 59.62; ER | Kirsty Coventry; Zimbabwe | 59.77 |
| Women's 200 m | Kirsty Coventry; Zimbabwe | 2:06.13; WR | Mireia Belmonte García; Spain | 2:07.47; ER | Hannah Miley; Great Britain | 2:08.79 |
| Women's 400 m | Kirsty Coventry; Zimbabwe | 4:26.52; WR | Hannah Miley; Great Britain | 4:27.27; ER | Mireia Belmonte García; Spain | 4:27.55 |
Freestyle relay
| Women's 4 × 100 m | Netherlands; Hinkelien Schreuder; Femke Heemskerk; Inge Dekker; Marleen Veldhuis | 3:29.42; WR | Australia; Alice Mills; Shayne Reese; Kelly Stubbins; Angie Bainbridge | 3:32.00 | Great Britain; Francesca Halsall; Caitlin McClatchey; Julia Beckett; Melanie Marshall | 3:32.88 |
| Women's 4 × 200 m | Netherlands; Inge Dekker; Femke Heemskerk; Marleen Veldhuis; Ranomi Kromowidjojo | 7:38.90; WR | Great Britain; Joanne Jackson; Melanie Marshall; Caitlin McClatchey; Rebecca Adlington | 7:38.96 | Australia; Bronte Barratt; Angie Bainbridge; Kelly Stubbins; Kylie Palmer | 7:39.01 |
Medley relay
| Women's 4 × 100 m | United States; Margaret Hoelzer; Jessica Hardy; Rachel Komisarz; Kara Denby | 3:51.36; WR | Australia; Rachel Goh; Sarah Katsoulis; Felicity Galvez; Alice Mills | 3:52.01 | Great Britain; Elizabeth Simmonds; Kate Haywood; Jemma Lowe; Francesca Halsall | 3:53.02; ER |

== Medals table ==
| Rank | Nation | Gold | Silver | Bronze | Total |
|---|---|---|---|---|---|
| 1 | United States (USA) | 10 | 6 | 1 | 17 |
| 2 | Australia (AUS) | 8 | 9 | 2 | 19 |
| 3 | Netherlands (NED) | 4 | 4 | 1 | 9 |
| 4 | Zimbabwe (ZIM) | 4 | 0 | 1 | 5 |
| 5 | Great Britain (GBR) | 3 | 10 | 11 | 24 |
| 6 | Russia (RUS) | 3 | 1 | 5 | 9 |
| 7 | Ukraine (UKR) | 2 | 3 | 2 | 7 |
| 8 | Croatia (CRO) | 2 | 0 | 2 | 4 |
| 9 | South Africa (RSA) | 1 | 1 | 4 | 6 |
| 10 | Slovenia (SLO) | 1 | 1 | 0 | 2 |
| 11 | Austria (AUT) | 1 | 0 | 1 | 2 |
| 11 | New Zealand (NZL) | 1 | 0 | 1 | 2 |
| 13 | Italy (ITA) | 0 | 2 | 2 | 4 |
| 14 | Spain (ESP) | 0 | 1 | 2 | 3 |
| 15 | Finland (FIN) | 0 | 1 | 1 | 2 |
| 16 | China (CHN) | 0 | 1 | 0 | 1 |
| 16 | Romania (ROM) | 0 | 1 | 0 | 1 |
| 18 | Poland (POL) | 0 | 0 | 2 | 2 |
| 19 | Greece (GRE) | 0 | 0 | 1 | 1 |
| 19 | Sweden (SWE) | 0 | 0 | 1 | 1 |
| Totals (20 entries) | | 40 | 41 | 40 | 121 |

== See also ==
- 2008 in swimming
