= Novosibirsk State Pedagogical University =

Public university in Novosibirsk, Russia

Coordinates: 55.0006°N 83.0182°E

- Новосибирский государственный педагогический университет
- Type: Public
- Established: 29 November 1935
- Rector: Gerasyov Alexey Dmitrievich
- Academic staff: 2,000
- Students: 13,500 (FTE)
- Location: Novosibirsk, Russia
- Campus: Urban
- Language: Russian
- Website: nspu.ru

Novosibirsk State Pedagogical University (NSPU; Russian: Новосибирский государственный педагогический университет, abbreviated ФГБОУ ВО «НГПУ») is a coeducational and public research university located in Novosibirsk, Russia. It is the largest pedagogical university in Siberia and the Far East, with 13,500 students (FTEs) as of 2020. The current rector of the university is Gerasyov Alexey Dmitrievich.

Between 1941 and 1943 the university moved to Kolpashevo, Tomsk Oblast. Since 2011, the university has published Science for Education Today, formerly the Novosibirsk State Pedagogical University Вulletin, a peer-reviewed research periodical.

As a result of the COVID-19 pandemic, the university switched to remote instruction for all students except for first- and second- year undergraduates and students in program including laboratory and practical classes that require special conditions.

== Notable alumni ==
- Stanislav Pozdnyakov, fencer
