= Mitja Zastrow =

Dutch swimmer

Medal record

Men's swimming

Representing the Netherlands

Olympic Games
Silver medal – second place	2004 Athens	4×100 m freestyle

World Championships (SC)

Representing Germany
Bronze medal – third place	2000 Athens	4×100 m freestyle

Representing the Netherlands
Bronze medal – third place	2008 Manchester	4×100 m freestyle

European Championships (LC)

Representing the Netherlands
Bronze medal – third place	2008 Eindhoven	4×100 m freestyle

European Championships (SC)
Gold medal – first place	2005 Triest	4×50 m freestyle

Mitja Kolia Zastrow (born 7 March 1977) is a Dutch swimmer and an Olympic medalist. Originally from Germany, Zastrow was born and raised in Wuppertal, near Düsseldorf. He became a naturalized Dutch citizen in July 2003, after a conflict with the German Swimming Association. He currently trains at PSV Eindhoven in Eindhoven, Netherlands, with his coach, Torsten Petsch.

Zastrow's swimming career has been filled with a series of unfortunate injuries. In 2001, despite being the 100 meter freestyle champion in Germany, a hand injury kept him from attending the FINA World Championships in Fukuoka, Japan.

In 2003, at the FINA World Championships in Barcelona, Spain, Zastrow participated in his first World Championship as a Dutch citizen. However, due to a back injury, he was unable to swim in most of the events that he had qualified for.

Zastrow qualified fifth out of one hundred Dutch swimmers to participate in the 2004 Summer Olympics in Athens, Greece. Along with Pieter van den Hoogenband, Johan Kenkhuis, and Klaas-Erik Zwering, he was a member of the Dutch 4×100 meter freestyle relay team, which won silver by clocking in at 3:14.36.

Zastrow's specialty is actually the backstroke. He has been the Dutch record holder in the 50 meter backstroke since 2003.

Zastrow has a Chinese ideograph tattooed on his left shoulder. The character is "猴" and means "monkey."

== See also ==
- Dutch records in swimming
- German records in swimming
