= Swimming at the 2007 World Aquatics Championships – Men's 400 metre individual medley =

Men's 400 metre individual medley at the 2007 FINA World Championships
- Venue: Rod Laver Arena
- Date: 1 April 2007
- Competitors: 50
- Winning time: 4:06.22 WR

Medalists
gold medal	Michael Phelps	United States
silver medal	Ryan Lochte	United States
bronze medal	Luca Marin	Italy

The men's 400 metre individual medley (IM) at the 2007 World Aquatics Championships took place on 1 April (heats and final) at the Rod Laver Arena in Melbourne, Australia. As the event was over 400 meters in length, no semifinals were held in it and the top 8 swimmers from the preliminary heats advance directly to the single final heat. 50 swimmers were entered in the event, of which 49 swam.

Existing records at the start of the event were:

- World record (WR): 4:08.26, Michael Phelps (USA), August 17, 2004 in Athens, Greece
- Championship record (CR): 4:09.09, Michael Phelps (USA), Barcelona, Spain (July 27, 2003)

== Results ==
=== Finals ===
Place	Name	Nationality	Time	Note
1	Michael Phelps	USA	4:06.22	WR; 25.56/55.05 1:26.70/1:58.18; 2:33.30/3:09.33 3:38.43/4:06.22
2	Ryan Lochte	USA	4:09.74	
3	Luca Marin	Italy	4:09.88	
4	László Cseh	Hungary	4:14.76	
5	Ioannis Drymonakos	Greece	4:15.75	
6	Vasileios Demetis	Greece	4:16.83	
7	Tamás Kerékjártó	Hungary	4:17.32	
--	Oussama Mellouli	Tunisia	~~4:11.68~~	Result nullified (see his record for note)

=== Heats ===
Rank	Swimmer	Nation	Time	Note
1	Michael Phelps	USA	4:12.01	Q
2	Luca Marin	Italy	4:13.33	Q
3	Oussama Mellouli	Tunisia	~~4:13.44~~	Q
4	Ryan Lochte	USA	4:13.71	Q
5	László Cseh	Hungary	4:15.41	Q
6	Ioannis Drymonakos	Greece	4:16.65	Q
7	Tamás Kerékjártó	Hungary	4:17.68	Q
8	Vasileios Demetis	Greece	4:17.73	Q
9	Andrey Krylov	Russia	4:18.15	
10	Dean Kent	New Zealand	4:18.32	
11	Alessio Boggiatto	Italy	4:18.82	
12	Brian Johns	Canada	4:19.39	
13	Travis Nederpelt	Australia	4:20.22	
14	Paweł Korzeniowski	Poland	4:20.99	
15	Shinya Taniguchi	Japan	4:22.43	
16	Hidemasa Sano	Japan	4:22.68	
17	David Carry	Great Britain	4:22.76	
18	Mihail Alexandrov	Bulgaria	4:23.24	NR
19	ZHAO Tao	China	4:24.37	
20	Dinko Jukić	Austria	4:24.65	
21	Kvetosla Svoboda	Czech Republic	4:25.13	
22	Gard Kvale	Norway	4:25.37	NR
23	LI Ziqiang	China	4:25.72	
24	Carlos Almeida	Portugal	4:26.42	
25	Adam Lucas	Australia	4:26.45	
26	Andre Schultz	Brazil	4:27.00	
27	Ahmed Mathlouthi	Tunisia	4:28.32	
28	Duarte Mourao	Portugal	4:28.87	
29	Chris Christensen	Denmark	4:28.93	
30	Saša Imprić	Croatia	4:29.75	
31	Miguel Molina	Philippines	4:34.23	
32	Vasilii Danilov	Kyrgyzstan	4:35.63	
33	Diego Bonilla	Colombia	4:35.96	
34	Benjamin Guzman Blanco	Chile	4:36.80	
35	Shohruh Yunusov	Uzbekistan	4:36.81	
36	Rehan Poncha	India	4:37.32	
37	Sobitjon Amilov	Uzbekistan	4:37.92	
38	Dmitriy Gordiyenko	Kazakhstan	4:39.15	
39	Zhi Cong Lim	Singapore	4:41.01	
40	Iurii Zakharov	Kyrgyzstan	4:41.75	
41	Gianmarco Mosto	Peru	4:43.17	
42	Diego Castillo Granados	Panama	4:47.72	
43	Juan Montenegro	Guatemala	4:47.79	
44	Colin Bensadon	Gibraltar	4:48.26	
45	Wing Cheung Victor Wong	Macau	4:48.99	
46	Melvin Chua	Malaysia	4:49.73	
47	Eli Ebenezer Wong	Northern Mariana Islands	5:10.44	
--	Nicolas Rostoucher	France	DNS	
--	Jehad Al Henidi	Jordan	DQ	
--	Thiago Pereira	Brazil	DQ	

== See also ==
- Swimming at the 2005 World Aquatics Championships – Men's 400 metre individual medley
- Swimming at the 2008 Summer Olympics – Men's 400 metre individual medley
- Swimming at the 2009 World Aquatics Championships – Men's 400 metre individual medley
