= Swimming at the 2007 World Aquatics Championships – Men's 200 metre individual medley =

Men's 200 metre individual medley at the 2007 FINA World Championships
- Venue: Rod Laver Arena
- Dates: 28 March 2007 (heats, semifinals); 29 March 2007 (final)
- Competitors: 79
- Winning time: 1:54.98 WR

Medalists
gold medal	Michael Phelps	United States
silver medal	Ryan Lochte	United States
bronze medal	László Cseh	Hungary

The men's 200 metre individual medley (IM) at the 2007 World Aquatics Championships took place on 28 March (heats and semifinals) and on the evening of 29 March (final) at Rod Laver Arena in Melbourne, Australia. 79 swimmers were entered in the event, of which 74 swam.

Existing records at the start of the event were:

- World record (WR): 1:55.84, Michael Phelps (USA), 20 August 2006 in Victoria, Canada.
- Championship record (CR): 1:56.04, Michael Phelps (USA), Barcelona 2003 (25 July 2003)

== Results ==
=== Finals ===
Place	Name	Nationality	Time	Note
1	Michael Phelps	USA	1:54.98	WR; Splits: (24.96 / 53.58 / 1:27.47)
2	Ryan Lochte	USA	1:56.19	
3	László Cseh	Hungary	1:56.92	
4	Thiago Pereira	Brazil	1:58.98	
5	Brian Johns	Canada	1:59.46	
6	Tamás Kerékjártó	Hungary	1:59.57	
7	Vytautas Janušaitis	Lithuania	1:59.84	
8	Dean Kent	New Zealand	2:00.73	

=== Semifinals ===
Rank	Swimmer	Nation	Time	Note
1	Michael Phelps	USA	1:57.94	Q
2	Ryan Lochte	USA	1:58.48	Q
3	Thiago Pereira	Brazil	1:58.65	Q
4	László Cseh	Hungary	1:58.66	Q
5	Tamás Kerékjártó	Hungary	1:59.51	Q
6	Vytautas Janušaitis	Lithuania	2:00.05	Q
7	Brian Johns	Canada	2:00.25	Q
8	Dean Kent	New Zealand	2:00.53	Q
9	Hidemasa Sano	Japan	2:00.57	
10	Leith Brodie	Australia	2:00.77	
11	Ken Takakuwa	Japan	2:00.81	
12	Mihail Alexandrov	Bulgaria	2:01.83	
13	Adam Lucas	Australia	2:02.33	
14	Martin Liivamägi	Estonia	2:02.39	
15	Ioannis Kokkodis	Greece	2:02.69	
16	Andrey Krylov	Russia	2:02.92	

=== Heats ===
Rank	Swimmer	Nation	Time	Note
1	Michael Phelps	USA	1:58.70	Q
2	László Cseh	Hungary	1:58.78	Q
3	Thiago Pereira	Brazil	1:59.39	Q
4	Brian Johns	Canada	1:59.45	Q
5	Tamás Kerékjártó	Hungary	1:59.67	Q
6	Ryan Lochte	USA	1:59.92	Q
7	Vytautas Janušaitis	Lithuania	2:00.21	Q
8	Dean Kent	New Zealand	2:00.30	Q, NR
9	Ken Takakuwa	Japan	2:01.33	Q
10	Martin Liivamägi	Estonia	2:01.37	Q
11	Ioannis Kokkodis	Greece	2:01.47	Q
12	Hidemasa Sano	Japan	2:01.55	Q
13	Leith Brodie	Australia	2:01.66	Q
14	Mihail Alexandrov	Bulgaria	2:01.80	Q
15	Adam Lucas	Australia	2:02.10	Q
16	Andrey Krylov	Russia	2:02.30	Q
17	Alessio Boggiatto	Italy	2:02.41	
18	Saša Imprić	Croatia	2:02.52	
19	Gregor Tait	Great Britain	2:02.60	
20	Dinko Jukić	Austria	2:02.84	
21	Andre Schultz	Brazil	2:03.14	
22	Gard Kvale	Norway	2:03.35	
23	QU Jingyu	China	2:03.71	
24	Miguel Molina	Philippines	2:03.73	
25	Jeremy Knowles	Bahamas	2:04.20	
26	Duarte Mourao	Portugal	2:04.27	
27	Tomas Fucik	Czech Republic	2:04.92	
28	Martti Aljand	Estonia	2:04.94	
29	Ahmed Mathlouthi	Tunisia	2:05.34	
30	Paulius Andrijauskas	Lithuania	2:05.59	
31	Jens Thiele	Germany	2:05.83	
32	Dmitriy Gordiyenko	Kazakhstan	2:06.59	
33	Taki Mrabet	Tunisia	2:07.04	
33	ZHANG Zishan	China	2:07.04	
35	Carlos Almeida	Portugal	2:07.14	
36	Diego Bonilla	Colombia	2:07.26	
37	Zhi Cong Lim	Singapore	2:08.60	
38	Radomyos Matjiur	Thailand	2:08.78	
39	Vasilii Danilov	Kyrgyzstan	2:08.94	
40	Andrei Zaharov	Moldova	2:08.96	
41	Francisco Picasso Risso	Uruguay	2:10.18	
42	Malick Fall	Senegal	2:10.23	
43	Albert Cristiadi Sutanto	Indonesia	2:10.27	
43	Rehan Poncha	India	2:10.27	
45	Gianmarco Mosto	Peru	2:10.68	
46	Iurii Zakharov	Kyrgyzstan	2:11.41	
47	Juan Montenegro	Guatemala	2:11.98	
48	Sobitjon Amilov	Uzbekistan	2:12.07	
49	Youssef Hafdi	Morocco	2:12.51	
50	Bing Ming Thum	Singapore	2:12.62	
51	Morgan Locke	(United States Virgin Islands) Virgin Islands	2:12.78	
52	Yu An Lin	Chinese Taipei	2:13.00	
53	Shahin Baradaran Nakhjavani	Iran	2:13.30	
54	Arjun Muralidharan	India	2:13.91	
55	Carlos Eduardo Gil	Peru	2:14.11	
56	Shohruh Yunusov	Uzbekistan	2:14.42	
57	Diego Castillo Granados	Panama	2:15.28	
58	Yousuf Alyousuf	Saudi Arabia	2:15.31	
59	Amine Kouam	Morocco	2:15.71	
60	Melvin Chua	Malaysia	2:15.84	
61	Colin Bensadon	Gibraltar	2:16.12	
62	Hong Nam Lei	Macao	2:19.07	
63	Erik Rajohnson	Madagascar	2:20.78	
64	Adil Baig	Pakistan	2:20.93	
65	Eli Ebenezer Wong	Northern Mariana Islands	2:20.94	
66	Hazem Tashkandi	Saudi Arabia	2:22.25	
67	Fernando Medrano Medina	Nicaragua	2:22.67	
68	Gavin Santos	Gibraltar	2:23.88	
69	Yellow Yeiyah	Nigeria	2:26.31	
70	Zane Jordan	Zambia	2:26.34	
71	Jehad Al Henidi	Jordan	2:27.67	
72	Eric Williams	Nigeria	2:28.70	
73	Sadeq Damrah	Palestine	2:40.08	
--	Wei Wen Wang	Chinese Taipei	DQ	
--	Celestino Aguon	Guam	DNS	
--	Amar Shah	Kenya	DNS	
--	Sohaib Kalali	Syria	DNS	
--	Pablo Marmolejo	Mexico	DNS	
--	Romanos Alyfantis	Greece	DNS	

== See also ==
- Swimming at the 2005 World Aquatics Championships – Men's 200 metre individual medley
- Swimming at the 2008 Summer Olympics – Men's 200 metre individual medley
- Swimming at the 2009 World Aquatics Championships – Men's 200 metre individual medley
