= Swimming at the 2009 World Aquatics Championships – Men's 200 metre individual medley =

Men's 200 metre individual medley at the 2009 FINA World Championships
- Venue: Foro Italico
- Dates: 29 July 2009 (heats, semifinals); 30 July 2009 (final)
- Competitors: 102
- Winning time: 1:54.10 WR

Medalists
| gold medal | Ryan Lochte | United States |
| silver medal | László Cseh | Hungary |
| bronze medal | Eric Shanteau | United States |

The heats for the Men's 200 metre Individual Medley race at the 2009 World Championships took place in the morning and evening of 29 July and the final took place in the evening session of 30 July at the Foro Italico in Rome, Italy. The order of swimming in the medley was butterfly, backstroke, breaststroke, freestyle.

== Records ==
Prior to this competition, the existing world and competition records were as follows:

| World record | Michael Phelps (USA) | 1:54.23 | Beijing, China | 15 August 2008 |
| Championship record | Michael Phelps (USA) | 1:54.98 | Melbourne, Australia | 29 March 2007 |

The following records were established during the competition:

| Date | Round | Name | Nationality | Time | Record |
|---|---|---|---|---|---|
| 30 July | Final | Ryan Lochte | United States | 1:54.10 | WR |

== Results ==
=== Heats ===
| Rank | Heat | Lane | Name | Nationality | Time | Notes |
|---|---|---|---|---|---|---|
| 1 | 9 | 4 | László Cseh | Hungary | 1:56.34 | ER |
| 2 | 10 | 4 | Eric Shanteau | United States | 1:57.65 | |
| 3 | 10 | 7 | Leith Brodie | Australia | 1:57.66 | OC |
| 3 | 11 | 3 | Thiago Pereira | Brazil | 1:57.66 | SA |
| 5 | 11 | 4 | Ryan Lochte | United States | 1:57.94 | |
| 6 | 9 | 5 | James Goddard | United Kingdom | 1:58.40 | |
| 7 | 9 | 3 | Gergő Kis | Hungary | 1:58.48 | |
| 8 | 11 | 7 | Gal Nevo | Israel | 1:58.55 | NR |
| 9 | 11 | 5 | Ken Takakuwa | Japan | 1:58.60 | |
| 10 | 11 | 6 | Alessio Boggiatto | Italy | 1:58.81 | |
| 11 | 11 | 0 | Yannick Lebherz | Germany | 1:58.94 | NR |
| 12 | 10 | 5 | Darian Townsend | South Africa | 1:58.96 | |
| 13 | 11 | 2 | Henrique Rodrigues | Brazil | 1:59.21 | |
| 14 | 10 | 6 | Takuro Fujii | Japan | 1:59.26 | |
| 15 | 9 | 8 | Joseph Roebuck | United Kingdom | 1:59.65 | |
| 16 | 7 | 3 | Martin Liivamägi | Estonia | 1:59.95 | NR |
| 17 | 11 | 1 | Diogo Carvalho | Portugal | 2:00.05 | |
| 18 | 10 | 9 | Tommaso D'Orsogna | Australia | 2:00.31 | |
| 19 | 9 | 2 | Vytautas Janušaitis | Lithuania | 2:00.32 | |
| 20 | 10 | 3 | Bradley Ally | Barbados | 2:00.44 | |
| 21 | 10 | 2 | Fabien Horth | France | 2:00.47 | |
| 22 | 8 | 7 | Omar Pinzón | Colombia | 2:00.56 | NR |
| 23 | 11 | 9 | Lukasz Wojt | Poland | 2:00.72 | |
| 24 | 11 | 8 | Alan Cabello | Spain | 2:00.73 | |
| 25 | 9 | 1 | Brenton Cabello | Spain | 2:01.00 | |
| 26 | 9 | 6 | Romanos Alyfantis | Greece | 2:01.06 | |
| 27 | 8 | 1 | Liu Weijia | China | 2:01.11 | |
| 28 | 10 | 8 | Miguel Molina | Philippines | 2:01.19 | |
| 29 | 7 | 7 | Martti Aljand | Estonia | 2:01.26 | |
| 30 | 9 | 7 | Riaan Schoeman | South Africa | 2:01.31 | |
| 31 | 8 | 4 | Saša Imprić | Croatia | 2:01.41 | |
| 32 | 10 | 0 | Andrey Krylov | Russia | 2:01.43 | |
| 33 | 8 | 2 | Chris Christensen | Denmark | 2:01.62 | NR |
| 34 | 9 | 0 | Mateusz Matczak | Poland | 2:01.65 | |
| 35 | 8 | 3 | Jordan Hartney | Canada | 2:01.69 | |
| 36 | 7 | 6 | Carlos Almeida | Portugal | 2:01.78 | |
| 37 | 8 | 6 | Taki Mrabet | Tunisia | 2:01.81 | |
| 38 | 6 | 1 | Niksa Roki | Croatia | 2:01.86 | |
| 39 | 8 | 9 | Dmitriy Gordiyenko | Kazakhstan | 2:02.20 | |
| 40 | 9 | 9 | Gard Kvale | Norway | 2:02.29 | |
| 41 | 8 | 8 | Tomas Fucik | Czech Republic | 2:02.60 | |
| 41 | 10 | 1 | Dinko Jukić | Austria | 2:02.60 | |
| 43 | 7 | 5 | Dominik Dur | Austria | 2:03.59 | |
| 44 | 7 | 4 | Sun Han | China | 2:03.95 | |
| 45 | 6 | 2 | Anders McIntyre | Canada | 2:04.67 | |
| 46 | 7 | 1 | Mehdi Hamama | Algeria | 2:04.86 | |
| 47 | 7 | 2 | Raphaël Stacchiotti | Luxembourg | 2:05.51 | |
| 48 | 6 | 9 | Pedro Pinotes | Angola | 2:05.57 | |
| 49 | 5 | 8 | Saeid Maleka Ashtiani | Iran | 2:05.96 | NR |
| 50 | 4 | 4 | Branden Whitehurst | (United States Virgin Islands) Virgin Islands | 2:06.05 | NR |
| 51 | 7 | 9 | Serkan Atasay | Turkey | 2:06.27 | |
| 52 | 5 | 4 | Rehan Poncha | India | 2:06.29 | NR |
| 53 | 7 | 0 | Ezequiel Trujillo | Mexico | 2:06.30 | |
| 54 | 4 | 7 | Mindaugas Margis | Lithuania | 2:06.99 | |
| 55 | 5 | 7 | Hocine Haciane | Andorra | 2:07.46 | |
| 56 | 6 | 8 | Benjamin Guzman Blanco | Chile | 2:07.50 | |
| 57 | 5 | 6 | Raúl López | Mexico | 2:07.92 | |
| 58 | 6 | 3 | Laurent Carnol | Luxembourg | 2:08.01 | |
| 59 | 6 | 7 | Robert Walsh | Philippines | 2:08.37 | |
| 60 | 5 | 3 | Chien Jui-Ting | Chinese Taipei | 2:08.87 | |
| 61 | 4 | 2 | Jean Luis Gomez | Dominican Republic | 2:09.08 | NR |
| 62 | 5 | 1 | Agnishwar Jayaprakash | India | 2:09.11 | |
| 63 | 5 | 5 | Dmitriy Shvetsov | Uzbekistan | 2:09.80 | |
| 64 | 6 | 6 | Radomyos Matjiur | Thailand | 2:09.91 | |
| 65 | 5 | 0 | Giorgi Mtvralashvili | Georgia | 2:10.12 | |
| 66 | 5 | 2 | Diego Castillo | Panama | 2:10.37 | |
| 67 | 4 | 6 | Berrada Morad | Morocco | 2:10.40 | |
| 68 | 3 | 5 | Nicholas James | Zimbabwe | 2:10.42 | |
| 69 | 3 | 6 | Byron Briedenhann | Namibia | 2:10.92 | |
| 70 | 6 | 5 | Pan Kai-Wen | Chinese Taipei | 2:11.35 | |
| 71 | 4 | 0 | Obaid Al-Jasmi | United Arab Emirates | 2:11.62 | NR |
| 72 | 3 | 2 | Ryan Nelthropp | (United States Virgin Islands) Virgin Islands | 2:12.22 | |
| 73 | 4 | 3 | Dmitrii Aleksandrov | Kyrgyzstan | 2:12.57 | |
| 74 | 7 | 8 | Yury Zaharov | Kyrgyzstan | 2:12.76 | |
| 75 | 6 | 0 | Pang Sheng Jun | Singapore | 2:13.96 | |
| 76 | 4 | 5 | Rafael Alfaro | El Salvador | 2:13.99 | |
| 77 | 4 | 2 | Colin Bensadon | Gibraltar | 2:14.05 | |
| 78 | 4 | 8 | Roy Barahona | Honduras | 2:14.18 | |
| 79 | 4 | 9 | Eli Ebenezer Wong | Northern Mariana Islands | 2:14.96 | |
| 80 | 5 | 9 | Marzouq Alsalem | Kuwait | 2:15.38 | |
| 81 | 3 | 9 | Vincent Perry | French Polynesia | 2:16.89 | |
| 82 | 3 | 3 | Diguan Pigot | Suriname | 2:18.08 | |
| 83 | 3 | 7 | Gary Pineda | Guatemala | 2:18.90 | |
| 84 | 2 | 7 | Benjamin Gabbard | American Samoa | 2:19.88 | |
| 85 | 2 | 2 | Jean Marie Froget | Mauritius | 2:21.32 | |
| 86 | 2 | 6 | Andres Castillo | Panama | 2:21.44 | |
| 87 | 2 | 4 | Pablo Navarrete | Nicaragua | 2:21.45 | |
| 88 | 2 | 0 | Paul Elaisa | Fiji | 2:21.51 | |
| 89 | 3 | 1 | Kareem Ennab | Jordan | 2:21.72 | |
| 90 | 2 | 8 | Mathieu Marquet | Mauritius | 2:25.76 | |
| 91 | 2 | 9 | Anthony Clark | French Polynesia | 2:31.04 | |
| 92 | 2 | 1 | Jon Pepaj | Albania | 2:35.67 | |
| 93 | 1 | 4 | Mohamed Mujahid | Maldives | 2:40.58 | |
| 94 | 1 | 3 | Ching Maou Wei | American Samoa | 2:55.40 | |
| 95 | 1 | 5 | Hassan Mubah | Maldives | 2:57.09 | |
| - | 1 | 6 | Glenn Victor Sutanto | Indonesia | DNS | |
| - | 3 | 4 | Erik Rajohnson | Madagascar | DNS | |
| - | 3 | 8 | Endi Babi | Albania | DNS | |
| - | 3 | 0 | Mubarak Al-Besher | United Arab Emirates | DSQ | |
| - | 6 | 4 | Aleksey Derlyugov | Uzbekistan | DSQ | |
| - | 8 | 0 | Vadym Lepskyy | Ukraine | DSQ | |
| - | 8 | 5 | Denys Dubrov | Ukraine | DSQ | |

=== Semifinals ===
| Rank | Heat | Lane | Name | Nationality | Time | Notes |
|---|---|---|---|---|---|---|
| 1 | 2 | 3 | Ryan Lochte | United States | 1:55.18 | |
| 1 | 2 | 4 | László Cseh | Hungary | 1:55.18 | ER |
| 3 | 2 | 5 | Leith Brodie | Australia | 1:56.75 | OC |
| 4 | 1 | 3 | James Goddard | United Kingdom | 1:57.12 | NR |
| 5 | 1 | 4 | Eric Shanteau | United States | 1:57.16 | |
| 6 | 1 | 5 | Thiago Pereira | Brazil | 1:57.35 | SA |
| 7 | 2 | 2 | Ken Takakuwa | Japan | 1:58.09 | |
| 8 | 2 | 6 | Gergő Kis | Hungary | 1:58.11 | |
| 9 | 1 | 6 | Gal Nevo | Israel | 1:58.25 | NR |
| 10 | 1 | 2 | Alessio Boggiatto | Italy | 1:58.33 | NR |
| 11 | 1 | 7 | Darian Townsend | South Africa | 1:58.50 | |
| 12 | 1 | 1 | Takuro Fujii | Japan | 1:59.21 | |
| 13 | 2 | 7 | Yannick Lebherz | Germany | 1:59.54 | |
| 14 | 2 | 8 | Joseph Roebuck | United Kingdom | 1:59.82 | |
| 15 | 2 | 1 | Henrique Rodrigues | Brazil | 2:00.25 | |
| 16 | 1 | 8 | Martin Liivamägi | Estonia | 2:01.24 | |

=== Final ===
| Rank | Lane | Name | Nationality | Time | Notes |
|---|---|---|---|---|---|
| 1st place, gold medalist(s) | 4 | Ryan Lochte | United States | 1:54.10 | WR |
| 2nd place, silver medalist(s) | 5 | László Cseh | Hungary | 1:55.24 | |
| 3rd place, bronze medalist(s) | 2 | Eric Shanteau | United States | 1:55.36 | |
| 4 | 7 | Thiago Pereira | Brazil | 1:55.55 | SA |
| 5 | 3 | Leith Brodie | Australia | 1:56.69 | OC |
| 6 | 6 | James Goddard | United Kingdom | 1:57.93 | |
| 7 | 1 | Ken Takakuwa | Japan | 1:58.02 | |
| 8 | 8 | Gergő Kis | Hungary | 1:59.32 | |

== See also ==
- Swimming at the 2007 World Aquatics Championships – Men's 200 metre individual medley
- Swimming at the 2008 Summer Olympics – Men's 200 metre individual medley
