= Swimming at the 2009 World Aquatics Championships – Men's 400 metre individual medley =

Men's 400 metre individual medley at the 2009 FINA World Championships
- Venue: Foro Italico
- Dates: August 2, 2009
- Competitors: 72
- Winning time: 4:07.01

Medalists
gold medal	Ryan Lochte	United States
silver medal	Tyler Clary	United States
bronze medal	László Cseh	Hungary

The men's 400 metre individual medley event at the 2009 World Aquatics Championships took place on August 2 at the Foro Italico. The heats were held during the morning session and the final were held during the evening session. This swimming event used medley swimming. Because the swimming pool is 50 metres long, this race consisted of eight lengths of the pool. The first two lengths were swum using the butterfly stroke, the second pair with the backstroke, the third pair of lengths in breaststroke, and the final two were freestyle. Unlike other events using freestyle, swimmers could not use butterfly, backstroke, or breaststroke for the freestyle leg; most swimmers use the front crawl in freestyle events.

== Records ==
Prior to this competition, the existing world and competition records were as follows:

World record	Michael Phelps (USA)	4:03.84	Beijing, China	10 August 2008
Championship record	Michael Phelps (USA)	4:06.22	Melbourne, Australia	April 1, 2007

== Results ==
=== Heats ===
Rank	Name	Nationality	Time	Heat	Lane	Notes
1	Tyler Clary	United States	4:10.04	6	4	
2	László Cseh	Hungary	4:10.33	7	4	
3	Gergő Kis	Hungary	4:10.99	7	5	
4	Ryan Lochte	United States	4:11.05	8	4	
5	Thomas Haffield	United Kingdom	4:11.32	6	3	NR
6	Gal Nevo	Israel	4:11.51	7	2	NR
7	Luca Marin	Italy	4:12.66	8	5	
8	Thiago Pereira	Brazil	4:13.05	8	3	
9	Yuya Horihata	Japan	4:14.43	6	6	
10	Alessio Boggiatto	Italy	4:14.56	6	5	
11	Mateusz Matczak	Poland	4:14.57	8	7	
12	Ken Takakuwa	Japan	4:14.73	8	6	
13	Riaan Schoeman	South Africa	4:15.50	7	3	
14	Leith Brodie	Australia	4:15.52	4	2	
15	Chris Christensen	Denmark	4:16.78	5	5	NR
16	Chad le Clos	South Africa	4:17.39	7	1	
17	Lewis Smith	United Kingdom	4:17.56	6	2	
18	Diogo Carvalho	Portugal	4:18.08	6	8	
19	Liu Weijia	China	4:18.11	6	7	
20	Dinko Jukić	Austria	4:18.38	8	1	
21	Yannick Lebherz	Germany	4:18.43	7	7	
22	Stephen Parkes	Australia	4:18.60	8	8	
23	Vadym Lepskyy	Ukraine	4:18.88	5	7	
24	Jordan Hartney	Canada	4:20.15	6	1	
25	Omar Pinzón	Colombia	4:20.98	7	9	NR
26	Carlos Almeida	Portugal	4:21.36	5	6	
27	Dominik Dur	Austria	4:22.04	8	0	
28	Andrey Krylov	Russia	4:22.29	7	6	
29	Dmitriy Gordiyenko	Kazakhstan	4:22.84	5	3	
30	Niksa Roki	Croatia	4:25.40	5	4	
31	Pedro Pinotes	Angola	4:25.62	4	6	
32	Miguel Molina	Philippines	4:26.20	6	0	
33	Henrique Rodrigues	Brazil	4:26.39	7	8	
34	Vytautas Janušaitis	Lithuania	4:26.52	7	0	
35	Raphaël Stacchiotti	Luxembourg	4:26.63	4	4	
36	Taki Mrabet	Tunisia	4:26.98	6	9	
37	Anders McIntyre	Canada	4:27.78	5	2	
38	Jan Karel Petric	Slovenia	4:29.15	4	1	
39	Aleksey Derlyugov	Uzbekistan	4:29.49	4	3	
40	Ezequiel Trujillo	Mexico	4:29.81	5	9	
41	Raúl López	Mexico	4:30.91	5	0	
42	Rehan Poncha	India	4:31.34	3	3	
43	Chien Jui-Ting	Chinese Taipei	4:31.99	4	3	
44	Esteban Enderica	Ecuador	4:33.73	3	8	
45	Benjamin Guzman Blanco	Chile	4:34.43	4	8	
46	Sobitjon Amilov	Uzbekistan	4:37.16	3	2	
47	Saeed Malekae Aahtiani	Iran	4:37.65	2	5	
48	Berrada Morad	Morocco	4:38.95	3	9	NR
49	Robert Walsh	Philippines	4:40.57	3	5	
50	Pan Kai-Wen	Chinese Taipei	4:41.92	4	5	
51	Loai Abdulwahid Tashkandi	Saudi Arabia	4:42.09	2	2	
52	Rafael Alfaro	El Salvador	4:42.15	2	3	
53	Ivan Alejandro Enderica	Ecuador	4:42.62	3	6	
54	Giorgi Mtvralashvili	Georgia	4:42.65	3	0	
55	Pang Sheng Jun	Singapore	4:43.20	4	0	
56	Ahmed Jebrel	Palestine	4:45.73	2	7	
57	Colin Bensadon	Gibraltar	4:47.14	2	6	
58	Nicholas James	Zimbabwe	4:48.21	1	3	
59	Vitalii Khudiakov	Kyrgyzstan	4:52.96	2	4	
60	Radomyos Matjiur	Thailand	4:59.20	3	7	
61	Bryson Mays	United States Virgin Islands	4:59.30	2	1	
62	Benjamin Gabbard	American Samoa	5:05.88	1	5	
63	Vincent Perry	Tahiti	5:07.98	2	8	
–	Elio Berberi	Albania	DNS	1	4	
–	Ryan Nelthropp	(United States Virgin Islands) Virgin Islands	DNS	2	0	
–	Marzouq Alsalem	Kuwait	DNS	3	1	
–	Cheah Mingzhe Marcus	Singapore	DNS	3	4	
–	Saša Imprić	Croatia	DNS	4	9	
–	Bradley Ally	Barbados	DNS	8	2	
–	Romanos Alyfantis	Greece	DNS	8	9	
–	Sun Han	China	DSQ	5	1	
–	Vasilii Danilov	Kyrgyzstan	DSQ	5	8	

=== Final ===
Rank	Lane	Name	Nationality	Time	Notes
1st place, gold medalist(s)	6	Ryan Lochte	United States	4:07.01	
2nd place, silver medalist(s)	4	Tyler Clary	United States	4:07.31	
3rd place, bronze medalist(s)	5	László Cseh	Hungary	4:07.37	
4	8	Thiago Pereira	Brazil	4:08.86	SA
5	3	Gergő Kis	Hungary	4:10.40	
6	7	Gal Nevo	Israel	4:12.33	
7	1	Luca Marin	Italy	4:13.63	
7	2	Thomas Haffield	United Kingdom	4:13.63	
