= Swimming at the 2005 World Aquatics Championships – Men's 400 metre individual medley =

Men's 400m I.M. at the 2005 FINA World Aquatics Championships
- Dates: 31 July 2005
- Competitors: 36 from 28 nations
- Winning time: 4 minutes 09.63 seconds

Medalists
gold medal	László Cseh	Hungary
silver medal	Luca Marin	Italy
bronze medal	Oussama Mellouli	Tunisia

The Men's 400m Individual Medley (or "I.M.") event at the 2005 FINA World Aquatics Championships was swum on 31 July 2005 in Montreal, Quebec, Canada. Preliminary heats were held in the day's morning session, with the top-8 finishers advancing to swim again in the event's final that evening.

Prior to the competition, the existing World (WR) and Championship (CR) records were as follows.

- WR: 4:08.26 swum by Michael Phelps (USA) on 14 August 2004 in Athens, Greece.
- CR: 4:09.09 swum by Michael Phelps (USA) on 27 July 2003 in Barcelona, Spain

== Results ==
=== Final ===
Place	Swimmer	Nation	Time	Notes
1	László Cseh	Hungary	4:09.63	
2	Luca Marin	Italy	4:11.67	
3	Oussama Mellouli	Tunisia	4:13.47	
4	Alessio Boggiatto	Italy	4:13.48	
5	Ryan Lochte	(United States) USA	4:13.67	
6	Hidemasa Sano	Japan	4:17.72	
7	Robert Margalis	(United States) USA	4:17.93	
8	Ioannis Drymonakos	Greece	4:19.12	

=== Preliminaries ===
Rank	Heat+Lane	Swimmer	Nation	Time	Notes
1	H5 L4	László Cseh	Hungary	4:14.15	q
2	H5 L5	Luca Marin	Italy	4:15.18	q
3	H5 L6	Robert Margalis	United States	4:16.25	q
4	H4 L4	Alessio Boggiatto	Italy	4:16.46	q
5	H4 L5	Ioannis Drymonakos	Greece	4:16.84	q
6	H3 L4	Oussama Mellouli	Tunisia	4:17.21	q
7	H3 L3	Ryan Lochte	United States	4:17.26	q
8	H5 L3	Hidemasa Sano	Japan	4:17.64	q
9	H3 L6	Nicolas Rostoucher	France	4:20.00	
10	H4 L2	Taishi Okude	Japan	4:20.71	
11	H5 L7	Robin van Aggele	Netherlands	4:20.90	
12	H4 L6	Igor Berezutsky	Russia	4:20.98	
13	H3 L2	Dean Kent	New Zealand	4:21.04	
14	H4 L3	Travis Nederpelt	Australia	4:21.10	
15	H3 L5	Ioannis Kokkodis	Greece	4:23.82	
16	H3 L7	Dmytro Nazarenko	Ukraine	4:24.15	
17	H5 L2	Adam Lucas	Australia	4:24.24	
18	H2 L1	Mihail Alexandrov	Bulgaria	4:25.50	
19	H3 L1	Bradley Ally	Barbados	4:28.91	
20	H3 L8	Paulius Andrijauskas	Lithuania	4:29.25	
21	H2 L2	Miguel Molina	Philippines	4:30.95	
22	H4 L1	Sebastian Stoss	Austria	4:31.25	
23	H2 L5	Hocine Haciane	Andorra	4:31.33	
24	H2 L8	Shaune Fraser	Cayman Islands	4:31.90	
25	H1 L4	Dmitriy Gordiyenko	Kazakhstan	4:32.05	
26	H2 L4	Guntars Deicmans	Latvia	4:34.00	
27	H2 L3	Yury Zaharov	Kyrgyzstan	4:39.22	
28	H1 L5	Vasilii Danilov	Kyrgyzstan	4:40.07	
29	H5 L8	Sheng-hieh Tang	Chinese Taipei	4:41.75	
30	H4 L8	Yu-An Lin	Chinese Taipei	4:44.06	
31	H2 L7	Lionel Lee	Singapore	4:46.60	
32	H1 L3	Francisco Montenegro	Guatemala	4:49.14	
33	H1 L6	Johnny Castillo	Panama	4:52.21	
-	-	Mohamad Al-Naser	Kuwait	DNS	
-	-	Keith Beavers	Canada	DNS	
-	-	Sébastien Rouault	France	DNS	
