= Swimming at the 2003 World Aquatics Championships – Men's 400 metre individual medley =

Men's 400m Individual Medley at the 2003 FINA World Aquatics Championships
- Dates: 27 July
- Winning time: 4 minute 09.09 seconds

Medalists
gold medal	Michael Phelps	United States
silver medal	László Cseh	Hungary
bronze medal	Oussama Mellouli	Tunisia

The Men's 400 Individual Medley event at the 10th FINA World Aquatics Championships swam on July 27, 2003 in Barcelona, Spain. Preliminary heats swam during the morning session, with the top-8 finisher advancing to swim again in the Final that evening.

At the start of the event, the existing World (WR) and Championship (CR) records were both:

- WR: 4:10.73 swum by Michael Phelps (USA) on April 6, 2003 in Indianapolis, USA
- CR: 4:12.30 swum by Tom Dolan (USA) on September 6, 1994 in Rome, Italy

== Results ==
=== Final ===
Rank	Swimmer	Nation	Time	Notes
1	Michael Phelps	United States	4:09.09	WR
2	László Cseh	Hungary	4:10.79	
3	Oussama Mellouli	Tunisia	4:15.36	
4	Tom Wilkens	United States	4:16.06	
5	Massimiliano Rosolino	Italy	4:17.30	
6	Takahiro Mori	Japan	4:17.54	
7	Brian Johns	Canada	4:20.27	
8	Alessio Boggiatto	Italy	4:21.23	

=== Preliminaries ===
Rank	Heat/Lane	Swimmer	Nation	Time	Notes
1	H6 L5	László Cseh	Hungary	4:14.11	q
2	H7 L4	Michael Phelps	United States	4:15.72	q
3	H5 L4	Takahiro Mori	Japan	4:17.12	q
4	H7 L3	Tom Wilkens	United States	4:17.21	q
5	H5 L3	Oussama Mellouli	Tunisia	4:18.21	q
6	H5 L5	Brian Johns	Canada	4:18.33	q
7	H6 L4	Alessio Boggiatto	Italy	4:18.88	q
8	H6 L6	Massimiliano Rosolino	Italy	4:19.50	q
9	H5 L8	Cezar Bădiță	Romania	4:19.72	
10	H6 L2	Robin Francis	Great Britain	4:20.10	
11	H6 L3	Justin Norris	Australia	4:20.51	
11	H6 L1	Ioannis Kokkodis	Greece	4:20.51	
13	H7 L2	Jun Yoshi	Japan	4:20.52	
14	H7 L1	Igor Berezutskiy	Russia	4:20.61	
15	H7 L6	István Batházi	Hungary	4:20.67	
16	H7 L5	Peng Wu	China	4:20.92	
17	H4 L5	Marko Milenkovič	Slovenia	4:21.23	
18	H5 L6	Dmytro Nazarenko	Ukraine	4:21.74	
19	H5 L1	Michael Halika	Israel	4:21.76	
20	H7 L8	Terence Parkin	South Africa	4:22.34	
21	H6 L8	Yves Platel	Switzerland	4:23.16	
22	H5 L2	Trent Steed	Australia	4:23.29	
23	H4 L7	Vytautas Janušaitis	Lithuania	4:25.14	
24	H4 L3	Thiago Pereira	Brazil	4:25.32	
25	H4 L4	Ioannis Drymonakos	Greece	4:26.07	
26	H6 L7	Carlos Sayao	Canada	4:26.27	
27	H5 L7	Dean Kent	New Zealand	4:27.69	
28	H4 L8	Paulius Andrijauskas	Lithuania	4:27.80	
29	H3 L4	Tao Zhao	China	4:27.94	
30	H4 L1	Alexei Zatsepine	Russia	4:28.27	
31	H3 L6	Shilo Ayalon	Israel	4:28.37	
32	H3 L5	Guntars Deicmanis	Latvia	4:29.17	
33	H3 L2	Carlo Piccio	Philippines	4:30.19	
34	H3 L3	Miguel Molina	Philippines	4:32.27	
35	H2 L4	Vladimir Labzin	Estonia	4:33.26	
36	H4 L6	Jan Vitazka	Czech Republic	4:33.52	
37	H3 L8	Yi-Khy Saw	Malaysia	4:37.21	
38	H4 L2	Mihail Alexandrov	Bulgaria	4:37.90	
39	H3 L7	Hocine Haciane	Andorra	4:38.13	
40	H2 L2	Jonathan Mauri	Costa Rica	4:41.41	
41	H2 L7	Rehan Poncha	India	4:41.49	
42	H2 L5	Marcos Burgos	Chile	4:41.55	
43	H1 L4	Kunakorn Yimsomruay	Thailand	4:44.13	
44	H2 L3	David Cartin	Costa Rica	4:46.30	
45	H2 L6	Yury Zaharov	Kyrgyzstan	4:48.33	
46	H1 L5	Dean Palacios	Northern Mariana Islands	4:55.06	
47	H1 L2	Roy Barahona	Honduras	4:56.15	
48	H2 L1	Vasilii Danilov	Kyrgyzstan	4:57.90	
49	H1 L3	Rony Bakale	Republic of the Congo	5:01.16	
49	H1 L1	Seung Gin Lee	Northern Mariana Islands	5:01.16	
51	H1 L7	Hei Meng Lao	Macau	5:10.29	
-	H7 L7	Nicolas Rostoucher	France	DQ	
-	-	George Demetriades	Cyprus	DNS	
-	-	Jean-Luc Razakarivony	Madagascar	DNS	
-	-	Joao Matias	Angola	DNS	
-	-	Chisela Kanchela	Zambia	DNS	
