= Swimming at the 2008 Summer Olympics – Men's 200 metre individual medley =

Men's 200 metre individual medley at the Games of the XXIX Olympiad
- Venue: Beijing National Aquatics Center
- Date: August 13, 2008 (heats); August 14, 2008 (semifinals); August 15, 2008 (final)
- Competitors: 47 from 42 nations
- Winning time: 1:54.23 WR

Medalists
1st place, gold medalist(s)		Michael Phelps	United States
2nd place, silver medalist(s)		László Cseh	Hungary
3rd place, bronze medalist(s)		Ryan Lochte	United States

The men's 200 metre individual medley event at the 2008 Olympic Games took place on 13–15 August at the Beijing National Aquatics Center in Beijing, China.

U.S. swimmer Michael Phelps blasted a new world record to defend his title in the event, and more importantly, claim his sixth Olympic gold, twelfth career, and fourteenth overall medal. He established a sterling time of 1:54.23 to lower his prior standard from the Olympic trials by almost six-tenths of a second (0.60). Hungary's László Cseh added a third silver to his collection, finishing with a European record of 1:56.52. Phelps' teammate and archrival Ryan Lochte earned a bronze in a time of 1:56.53, just a hundredth of a second (0.01) behind Cseh. The podium placements also replicated the results of the 400 m individual medley, held on the first day of the Games.

Brazil's Thiago Pereira finished fourth with a time of 1:58.14, and was followed in the fifth spot by Japan's Ken Takakuwa, in an Asian record of 1:58.22. A full second later, Great Britain's James Goddard posted a time of 1:59.24 to earn a sixth spot, while Canada's Keith Beavers (1:59.43) and Goddard's teammate Liam Tancock (2:00.76) rounded out the finale.

== Records ==
Prior to this competition, the existing world and Olympic records were as follows.

World record	Michael Phelps (USA)	1:54.80	Omaha, United States	5 July 2008	
Olympic record	Michael Phelps (USA)	1:57.14	Athens, Greece	19 August 2004	-

The following new world and Olympic records were set during this competition.

Date	Event	Name	Nationality	Time	Record
August 15	Final	Michael Phelps	United States	1:54.23	WR

== Results ==
=== Heats ===
Rank	Heat	Lane	Name	Nationality	Time	Notes
1	5	4	Ryan Lochte	United States	1:58.15	Q
2	4	4	László Cseh	Hungary	1:58.29	Q
3	5	5	Thiago Pereira	Brazil	1:58.41	Q
4	4	6	Ken Takakuwa	Japan	1:58.51	Q, AS
5	4	7	Bradley Ally	Barbados	1:58.57	Q, NR
6	6	4	Michael Phelps	United States	1:58.65	Q
7	5	7	Alessio Boggiatto	Italy	1:58.80	Q
8	6	2	Takuro Fujii	Japan	1:59.19	Q
9	5	1	Keith Beavers	Canada	1:59.19	Q, NR
10	6	1	Darian Townsend	South Africa	1:59.22	Q, AF
11	6	6	Vytautas Janušaitis	Lithuania	1:59.63	Q
12	3	1	Gal Nevo	Israel	1:59.66	Q
13	6	5	James Goddard	Great Britain	1:59.74	Q
14	4	5	Liam Tancock	Great Britain	1:59.79	Q
15	5	6	Leith Brodie	Australia	1:59.96	Q
16	4	3	Dinko Jukić	Austria	2:00.57	Q
17	5	3	Tamás Kerékjártó	Hungary	2:00.60	
18	6	3	Brian Johns	Canada	2:00.66	
19	6	7	Diogo Carvalho	Portugal	2:00.66	
20	3	6	Mihail Alexandrov	Bulgaria	2:00.70	NR
21	5	2	Dean Kent	New Zealand	2:01.12	
22	6	8	Alexander Tikhonov	Russia	2:01.21	
23	3	5	Ioannis Kokkodis	Greece	2:01.22	
24	3	8	Jeremy Knowles	Bahamas	2:01.35	NR
25	2	6	Gard Kvale	Norway	2:01.52	NR
26	4	2	Łukasz Wójt	Poland	2:01.54	
27	2	3	Miguel Molina	Philippines	2:01.61	
28	2	4	Vadym Lepskyy	Ukraine	2:01.73	
29	3	7	Saša Imprić	Croatia	2:01.83	
30	1	7	Omar Pinzón	Colombia	2:02.28	
31	2	2	Tomáš Fučík	Czech Republic	2:02.85	
32	1	5	Chris Christensen	Denmark	2:02.93	
33	4	1	Brenton Cabello	Spain	2:03.08	
34	3	4	Qu Jingyu	China	2:03.15	
35	4	8	Martin Liivamägi	Estonia	2:03.56	
36	2	5	Nicholas Bovell	Trinidad and Tobago	2:03.90	
37	3	3	Dmitriy Gordiyenko	Kazakhstan	2:03.92	
38	1	1	Andrejs Dūda	Latvia	2:04.18	
39	5	8	Robin van Aggele	Netherlands	2:04.33	
40	3	2	Markus Deibler	Germany	2:04.54	
41	1	2	Mehdi Hamama	Algeria	2:04.91	
42	2	8	Serkan Atasay	Turkey	2:05.25	
43	2	1	Leopoldo Andara	Venezuela	2:05.71	NR
44	1	4	Park Beom-ho	South Korea	2:06.17	
45	1	3	Iurii Zakharov	Kyrgyzstan	2:07.01	
46	1	6	Danil Bugakov	Uzbekistan	2:10.04	
	2	7	Andrew Bree	Ireland	DNS	

=== Semifinals ===
==== Semifinal 1 ====
Rank	Lane	Name	Nationality	Time	Notes
1	3	Michael Phelps	United States	1:57.70	Q
2	4	László Cseh	Hungary	1:58.19	Q
3	5	Ken Takakuwa	Japan	1:58.49	Q, AS
4	1	Liam Tancock	Great Britain	1:59.42	Q
5	6	Keith Beavers	Canada	1:59.43	Q
6	2	Darian Townsend	South Africa	1:59.65	
7	7	Gal Nevo	Israel	2:00.43	
8	8	Dinko Jukić	Austria	2:00.98	

==== Semifinal 2 ====
Rank	Lane	Name	Nationality	Time	Notes
1	4	Ryan Lochte	United States	1:57.69	Q
2	5	Thiago Pereira	Brazil	1:58.06	Q
3	1	James Goddard	Great Britain	1:58.63	Q
4	3	Bradley Ally	Barbados	1:59.53	
5	2	Takuro Fujii	Japan	1:59.59	
6	6	Alessio Boggiatto	Italy	1:59.77	
7	8	Leith Brodie	Australia	2:00.57	
8	7	Vytautas Janušaitis	Lithuania	2:00.76	

=== Final ===
Rank	Lane	Name	Nationality	Time	Notes
1st place, gold medalist(s)	5	Michael Phelps	United States	1:54.23	WR
2nd place, silver medalist(s)	6	László Cseh	Hungary	1:56.52	EU
3rd place, bronze medalist(s)	4	Ryan Lochte	United States	1:56.53	
4	3	Thiago Pereira	Brazil	1:58.14	
5	2	Ken Takakuwa	Japan	1:58.22	AS
6	7	James Goddard	Great Britain	1:59.24	
7	8	Keith Beavers	Canada	1:59.43	
8	1	Liam Tancock	Great Britain	2:00.76	
