= Swimming at the 2001 World Aquatics Championships – Men's 200 metre individual medley =

Men's 200 metre individual medley at the 2001 FINA World Championships
- Dates: 25 July 2001 (heats, semifinals); 26 July 2001 (final)
- Competitors: 44
- Winning time: 1 minute 59.71 seconds

Medalists
gold medal	Massimiliano Rosolino	Italy
silver medal	Thomas Wilkens	United States
bronze medal	Justin Norris	Australia

The men's 200 metre individual medley event at the 2001 World Aquatics Championships took place 26 July. The heats and semifinals took place 25 July, with the final being held on 26 July.

== Records ==
Prior to the competition, the existing world and championship records were as follows:

World record	Jani Sievinen (FIN)	1:58.16	Rome, Italy	11 September 1994
Championship record	Jani Sievinen (FIN)	1:58.16	Rome, Italy	11 September 1994

== Results ==
=== Heats ===
Rank	Name	Nationality	Time	Notes
1	George Bovell	Trinidad and Tobago	2:01.35	Q
2	Thomas Wilkens	United States	2:01.42	Q
3	Massimiliano Rosolino	Italy	2:02.02	Q
4	Jiro Miki	Japan	2:02.13	Q
5	Alessio Boggiatto	Italy	2:02.22	Q
6	Justin Norris	Australia	2:02.42	Q
7	Peter Mankoč	Slovenia	2:02.48	Q
8	Curtis Myden	Canada	2:02.55	Q
8	Brian Johns	Canada	2:02.55	Q
10	Robert Margalis	United States	2:02.81	Q
10	Takahiro Mori	Japan	2:02.81	Q
12	Grant McGregor	Australia	2:02.93	Q
13	Dean Kent	New Zealand	2:03.11	Q
14	Ioannis Kokkodis	Greece	2:04.11	Q
15	Brenton Cabello	Spain	2:04.19	Q
16	Jacob Carstensen	Denmark	2:04.23	Q, WD
17	Micky Halika	Israel	2:04.48	Q
18	Yves Platel	Switzerland	2:05.11	
19	Vasileios Demetis	Greece	2:05.35	
20	Marko Milenkovič	Slovenia	2:05.52	
21	Diego Urreta	Mexico	2:06.34	
22	George Gleason	United States Virgin Islands	2:06.66	
23	Javier Díaz	Mexico	2:07.80	
24	Margus Saia	Estonia	2:08.44	
25	Zheng Shibin	China	2:08.88	
26	Andrei Zaharov	Moldova	2:09.85	
27	Wu Nien-Pin	Chinese Taipei	2:10.20	
28	Gary Tan	Singapore	2:10.39	
29	Aleksandar Miladinovski	North Macedonia	2:10.88	
30	Khaly Ciss	Senegal	2:11.77	
31	Fergus Kuek	Singapore	2:12.29	
32	Wan Azlan	Malaysia	2:12.96	
33	Saad Khalloqi	Morocco	2:13.62	
34	Yang Shang-Hsuan	Chinese Taipei	2:13.65	
35	Fahad Al Otaibi	Kuwait	2:14.12	
36	Obaid Ahmed Al Jassimi	United Arab Emirates	2:15.75	
37	Mohammad Nazeri	Iran	2:18.05	
38	Daniel Kang	Guam	2:18.71	
39	Aleksey Bortnikov	Uzbekistan	2:20.71	
40	Wing Cheung Victor Wong	Macau	2:23.91	
41	Seung Gin Lee	Northern Mariana Islands	2:23.99	
42	Kin Duenas	Guam	2:27.22	
43	Zaid Saeed	Iraq	2:28.01	
44	Rony Bakale	Republic of the Congo	2:31.06	
–	Kenny Roberts	Seychelles	DNS	

=== Semifinals ===
Rank	Name	Nationality	Time	Notes
1	Thomas Wilkens	United States	2:00.45	Q
2	Alessio Boggiatto	Italy	2:00.49	Q
3	Justin Norris	Australia	2:01.07	Q
4	George Bovell	Trinidad and Tobago	2:01.35	Q
5	Jiro Miki	Japan	2:01.46	Q
6	Massimiliano Rosolino	Italy	2:01.57	Q
7	Takahiro Mori	Japan	2:01.67	Q
8	Curtis Myden	Canada	2:01.70	Q
9	Brian Johns	Canada	2:02.45	
10	Robert Margalis	United States	2:02.71	
11	Dean Kent	New Zealand	2:02.85	
12	Grant McGregor	Australia	2:04.00	
13	Micky Halika	Israel	2:04.38	
14	Ioannis Kokkodis	Greece	2:04.79	
15	Brenton Cabello	Spain	2:05.15	
16	Peter Mankoč	Slovenia	2:05.20	

=== Final ===
Rank	Name	Nationality	Time	Notes
1st place, gold medalist(s)	Massimiliano Rosolino	Italy	1:59.71	
2nd place, silver medalist(s)	Thomas Wilkens	United States	2:00.73	
3rd place, bronze medalist(s)	Justin Norris	Australia	2:00.91	
4	George Bovell	Trinidad and Tobago	2:01.50	
5	Takahiro Mori	Japan	2:01.54	
6	Jiro Miki	Japan	2:01.54	
7	Alessio Boggiatto	Italy	2:01.76	
8	Curtis Myden	Canada	2:02.42	
