= Swimming at the 2008 Summer Olympics – Men's 400 metre individual medley =

Men's 400 metre individual medley at the Games of the XXIX Olympiad
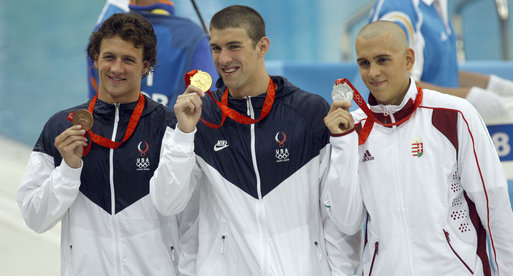
- Medal winners
- Venue: Beijing National Aquatics Center
- Dates: August 9 (heats); August 10 (final)
- Competitors: 29 from 22 nations
- Winning time: 4:03.84 WR

Medalists
1st place, gold medalist(s)		Michael Phelps	United States
2nd place, silver medalist(s)		László Cseh	Hungary
3rd place, bronze medalist(s)		Ryan Lochte	United States

The men's 400 metre individual medley event at the 2008 Olympic Games took place on 9–10 August at the Beijing National Aquatics Center in Beijing, China.

U.S. swimmer Michael Phelps blasted a new world record to defend his title in the event, and more importantly, claim his first Olympic gold, seventh career, and ninth overall. Phelps expected to get a major challenge from teammate Ryan Lochte, but he pulled away from the field on the breaststroke leg, and then opened up his lead on the freestyle leg to a strong finish in 4:03.84, more than a second faster than his world record from the U.S. Olympic Trials. Hungary's László Cseh earned his first ever Olympic silver medal at these Games, in a European record of 4:06.16. Lochte, who fought off a challenge against Phelps, faded towards the end of the race with a bronze in 4:08.09.

Italian tandem Alessio Boggiatto (4:12.16) and Luca Marin (4:12.47) earned fourth and fifth spots with only 0.31 seconds apart from each other. Hungary's Gergő Kis (4:12.84), Canada's Brian Johns (4:13.38), and Brazil's Thiago Pereira (4:15.40) rounded out the finale.

== Records ==
Prior to this competition, the existing world and Olympic records were as follows.

World record	Michael Phelps (USA)	4:05.25	Omaha, United States	29 June 2008	
Olympic record	Michael Phelps (USA)	4:08.26	Athens, Greece	14 August 2004	—

The following new world and Olympic records were set during this competition.

Date	Event	Name	Nationality	Time	Record
August 9	Heat 4	Michael Phelps	United States	4:07.82	OR
August 10	Final	Michael Phelps	United States	4:03.84	WR

== Results ==
=== Heats ===
Rank	Heat	Lane	Name	Nationality	Time	Notes
1	4	4	Michael Phelps	United States	4:07.82	Q, OR
2	2	4	László Cseh	Hungary	4:09.26	Q
3	4	5	Luca Marin	Italy	4:10.22	Q
4	3	4	Ryan Lochte	United States	4:10.33	Q
5	4	3	Gergő Kis	Hungary	4:10.66	Q
6	2	3	Alessio Boggiatto	Italy	4:10.68	Q
7	3	7	Brian Johns	Canada	4:11.41	Q, NR
8	3	5	Thiago Pereira	Brazil	4:11.74	Q
9	4	2	Keith Beavers	Canada	4:12.75	
10	2	1	Bradley Ally	Barbados	4:14.01	NR
11	2	8	Gal Nevo	Israel	4:14.03	NR
12	3	3	Riaan Schoeman	South Africa	4:14.09	
13	3	1	Andrey Krylov	Russia	4:14.55	
14	4	6	Travis Nederpelt	Australia	4:15.37	
15	2	2	Dinko Jukić	Austria	4:15.48	NR
16	2	7	Alexander Tikhonov	Russia	4:16.49	
17	2	5	Thomas Haffield	Great Britain	4:16.76	
18	2	6	Vasileios Demetis	Greece	4:18.40	
19	3	6	Euan Dale	Great Britain	4:18.60	
20	4	8	Vadym Lepskyy	Ukraine	4:20.96	
21	3	8	Omar Pinzón	Colombia	4:22.31	
22	4	7	Pierre Henri	France	4:22.41	
23	1	4	Nikša Roki	Croatia	4:22.44	
24	3	2	Javier Núñez	Spain	4:22.69	
25	4	1	Romanos Alyfantis	Greece	4:23.41	
26	1	6	Dmitriy Gordiyenko	Kazakhstan	4:25.20	
27	1	2	Vasilii Danilov	Kyrgyzstan	4:29.20	
28	1	3	Deniz Nazar	Turkey	4:30.80	
29	1	5	Hocine Haciane	Andorra	4:32.00	

=== Final ===
Rank	Lane	Name	Nationality	Time	Notes
1st place, gold medalist(s)	4	Michael Phelps	United States	4:03.84	WR
2nd place, silver medalist(s)	5	László Cseh	Hungary	4:06.16	EU
3rd place, bronze medalist(s)	6	Ryan Lochte	United States	4:08.09	
4	7	Alessio Boggiatto	Italy	4:12.16	
5	3	Luca Marin	Italy	4:12.47	
6	2	Gergő Kis	Hungary	4:12.84	
7	1	Brian Johns	Canada	4:13.38	
8	8	Thiago Pereira	Brazil	4:15.40	
