= Swimming at the 2012 European Aquatics Championships – Men's 200 metre individual medley =

Men's 200 metre individual medley at the 2012 European Aquatics Championships
- Dates: May 22, 2012 (heats and semifinals); May 23, 2012 (final)
- Competitors: 39 from 24 nations
- Winning time: 1:56.66

Medalists
gold medal	László Cseh	Hungary
silver medal	James Goddard	Great Britain
bronze medal	Markus Rogan	Austria

The men's 200 metre individual medley competition of the swimming events at the 2012 European Aquatics Championships took place May 22 and 23. The heats and semifinals took place on May 22, the final on May 23.

== Records ==
Prior to the competition, the existing world, European and championship records were as follows.

	Name	Nation	Time	Location	Date
World record	Ryan Lochte	United States	1:54.00	Shanghai	July 28, 2011
European record	László Cseh	Hungary	1:55.18	Rome	July 29, 2009
Championship record	László Cseh	Hungary	1:57.73	Budapest	August 11, 2010

== Results ==
=== Heats ===
40 swimmers participated in 6 heats.

Rank	Heat	Lane	Name	Nationality	Time	Notes
1	5	4	László Cseh	Hungary	1:59.15	Q
2	4	5	Dávid Verrasztó	Hungary	2:00.35	Q
3	4	6	Simon Sjödin	Sweden	2:00.38	Q
4	4	4	Markus Rogan	Austria	2:00.42	Q
5	5	3	Vytautas Janušaitis	Lithuania	2:00.61	Q
6	5	2	Dinko Jukić	Austria	2:00.88	
7	3	3	Federico Turrini	Italy	2:01.33	Q
8	5	6	Gal Nevo	Israel	2:01.35	Q
9	4	3	Diogo Filipe Carvalho	Portugal	2:01.56	Q
10	5	7	Dmitry Gorbunov	Russia	2:01.76	Q
11	3	5	Jan-David Schepers	Germany	2:02.35	Q
11	4	2	Luca Angelo Dioli	Italy	2:02.35	Q
13	3	6	Raphaël Stacchiotti	Luxembourg	2:02.36	Q
14	3	4	James Goddard	Great Britain	2:02.40	Q
15	2	1	Lukasz Wojt	Poland	2:02.41	Q
16	5	1	Martin Liivamägi	Estonia	2:02.42	Q
17	2	4	Jakub Maly	Austria	2:02.61	
18	4	7	Eduardo Solaeche Gomez	Spain	2:02.62	Q
19	5	5	Markus Deibler	Germany	2:02.66	
20	3	2	Ivan Trofimov	Russia	2:02.74	
21	3	8	Tom Kremer	Israel	2:03.42	
22	4	1	Andreas Vazaios	Greece	2:03.67	
23	2	6	Yury Suvorau	Belarus	2:03.94	
24	3	1	David Karasek	Switzerland	2:04.00	
25	2	7	Nikša Roki	Croatia	2:04.03	
26	2	8	Tomáš Fučík	Czech Republic	2:04.04	
27	4	8	Denys Dubrov	Ukraine	2:04.39	
28	2	2	Dominik Dür	Austria	2:04.46	
29	5	8	Maxym Shemberyev	Ukraine	2:04.54	
30	1	6	Irakli Bolkvadze	Georgia	2:05.57	
31	1	3	Pavol Jelenak	Slovakia	2:05.59	NR
32	2	3	Tal Hanani	Israel	2:05.65	
33	2	5	Jakub Jasinski	Poland	2:06.14	
34	1	4	Saša Imprić	Croatia	2:07.44	
35	1	1	Peter Gutyan	Slovakia	2:09.02	
36	1	5	Rok Resman	Slovenia	2:09.15	
37	1	7	Pavels Vilcans	Latvia	2:09.64	
38	1	2	Adam Strieborny	Slovakia	2:10.65	
39	1	8	Pavel Naroshkin	Estonia	2:11.10	
	3	7	Yakov-Yan Toumarkin	Israel	DNS	

=== Semifinals ===
The eight fasters swimmers advanced to the final.

==== Semifinal 1 ====
Rank	Lane	Name	Nationality	Time	Notes
1	5	Markus Rogan	Austria	2:00.58	Q
2	4	Dávid Verrasztó	Hungary	2:00.75	Q
3	3	Federico Turrini	Italy	2:01.17	Q
4	6	Diogo Filipe Carvalho	Portugal	2:01.64	
5	2	Jan-David Schepers	Germany	2:01.71	
6	8	Eduardo Solaeche Gomez	Spain	2:01.91	
7	1	Lukasz Wojt	Poland	2:02.40	
8	7	Raphaël Stacchiotti	Luxembourg	2:03.50	

==== Semifinal 2 ====
Rank	Lane	Name	Nationality	Time	Notes
1	4	László Cseh	Hungary	1:57.80	Q
2	5	Simon Sjödin	Sweden	1:59.44	Q, NR
3	6	Gal Nevo	Israel	1:59.62	Q
4	1	James Goddard	Great Britain	2:00.66	Q
5	3	Vytautas Janušaitis	Lithuania	2:00.75	Q
6	8	Martin Liivamägi	Estonia	2:02.01	
7	7	Luca Angelo Dioli	Italy	2:02.04	
8	2	Dmitry Gorbunov	Russia	2:02.94	

=== Final ===
The final was held at 18:17.

Rank	Lane	Name	Nationality	Time	Notes
1st place, gold medalist(s)	4	László Cseh	Hungary	1:56.66	CR
2nd place, silver medalist(s)	2	James Goddard	Great Britain	1:57.84	
3rd place, bronze medalist(s)	6	Markus Rogan	Austria	1:59.39	
4	3	Gal Nevo	Israel	1:59.74	
5	5	Simon Sjödin	Sweden	2:00.70	
6	7	Dávid Verrasztó	Hungary	2:01.70	
7	1	Vytautas Janušaitis	Lithuania	2:02.08	
8	8	Federico Turrini	Italy	2:02.50	
