= Swimming at the 2012 European Aquatics Championships – Men's 400 metre individual medley =

Swimming event at European aquatics championships

Men's 400 metre individual medley at the 2012 European Aquatics Championships
- Dates: May 27, 2012 (heats and final)
- Competitors: 31 from 19 nations
- Winning time: 4:12.17

Medalists
gold medal	László Cseh	Hungary
silver medal	Dávid Verrasztó	Hungary
bronze medal	Ioannis Drymonakos	Greece

The men's 400 metre individual medley competition of the swimming events at the 2012 European Aquatics Championships took place May 27. The heats and final took place on May 27.

== Records ==
Prior to the competition, the existing world, European and championship records were as follows.

	Name	Nation	Time	Location	Date
World record	Michael Phelps	United States	4:03.84	Beijing	August 10, 2008
European record	László Cseh	Hungary	4:06.16	Beijing	August 10, 2008
Championship record	László Cseh	Hungary	4:09.59	Eindhoven	March 24, 2008

== Results ==
=== Heats ===
31 swimmers participated in 4 heats.

Rank	Heat	Lane	Name	Nationality	Time	Notes
1	4	4	László Cseh	Hungary	4:16.14	Q
2	4	6	Gal Nevo	Israel	4:16.55	Q
3	4	3	Luca Marin	Italy	4:16.81	Q
4	3	4	Dávid Verrasztó	Hungary	4:17.01	Q
5	2	5	Maxym Shemberyev	Ukraine	4:17.86	Q
6	4	7	Ward Bauwens	Belgium	4:18.24	Q
7	2	8	Lukasz Wojt	Poland	4:18.55	Q
8	3	5	Ioannis Drymonakos	Greece	4:18.77	Q
9	3	7	Alexis Manacas Santos	Portugal	4:20.01	
10	2	4	Yannick Lebherz	Germany	4:20.34	
11	4	1	Yury Suvorau	Belarus	4:21.35	
12	2	2	Jan David Schepers	Germany	4:21.70	
13	2	3	Dinko Jukić	Austria	4:21.89	
14	3	6	Diogo Carvalho	Portugal	4:22.19	
15	4	5	Federico Turrini	Italy	4:22.21	
16	4	2	Eduardo Solaeche Gomez	Spain	4:22.91	
17	1	4	Ivan Trofimov	Russia	4:23.75	
18	2	7	Dmitry Gorbunov	Russia	4:24.07	
19	3	1	Jakub Maly	Austria	4:24.24	
20	2	1	Dominik Dür	Austria	4:24.73	
21	3	3	Gergely Gyurta	Hungary	4:24.83	
22	3	2	Tim Walburger	Germany	4:26.20	
23	4	8	Anton Sveinn McKee	Iceland	4:26.46	
24	1	1	Jan Karel Petric	Slovenia	4:28.18	
25	1	7	Irakli Bolkvadze	Georgia	4:29.25	
26	1	5	Nikša Roki	Croatia	4:29.85	
27	2	6	Raphaël Stacchiotti	Luxembourg	4:31.04	
28	1	6	Pavol Jelenak	Slovakia	4:32.51	
29	1	3	Peter Gutyan	Slovakia	4:33.49	
30	3	8	Tal Hanani	Israel	4:36.12	
	1	2	Rok Resman	Slovenia	DSQ	

=== Final ===
The final was held at 17:32.

Rank	Lane	Name	Nationality	Time	Notes
1st place, gold medalist(s)	4	László Cseh	Hungary	4:12.17	
2nd place, silver medalist(s)	6	Dávid Verrasztó	Hungary	4:14.23	
3rd place, bronze medalist(s)	8	Ioannis Drymonakos	Greece	4:14.41	NR
4	5	Gal Nevo	Israel	4:16.14	
5	3	Luca Marin	Italy	4:16.46	
6	1	Lukasz Wojt	Poland	4:17.36	
7	7	Ward Bauwens	Belgium	4:18.47	
8	2	Maxym Shemberyev	Ukraine	4:19.24	
