= Deniz Nazar =

Ukrainian-born Turkish swimmer

Personal information
- Full name: Dmytro Valeriyovych Nazarenko
- National team: Ukraine; Turkey
- Born: 19 August 1980 (age 45) Rivne, Ukrainian SSR, Soviet Union
- Height: 1.93 m (6 ft 4 in)
- Weight: 89 kg (196 lb)

Sport
- Sport: Swimming
- Strokes: Individual medley
- Club: Fenerbahçe Spor Kulübü (TUR)
- Coach: Oleksandr Yaremenko (UKR)

Dmytro Valeriyovych Nazarenko (also Deniz Nazar, Ukrainian: Дмитро Валерійович Назаренко; born August 19, 1980) is a Ukrainian-born Turkish former swimmer, who specialized in individual medley events. He is a fifth-place finalist in the 400 m individual medley at the 2002 European Short Course Swimming Championships in Riesa, Germany (4:12.07).

Nazar made his first Ukrainian team at the 2000 Summer Olympics in Sydney. Swimming in heat three of the men's 400 m individual medley, he edged out Slovenia's Marko Milenkovič to take a fifth seed and twenty-eighth overall by a 1.36-second margin in 4:25.26.

At the 2004 Summer Olympics in Athens, Nazar placed twenty-sixth overall in the 400 m individual medley. Swimming in heat four on the morning prelims, Nazar saved a seventh spot and twenty-sixth overall against China's Liu Weijia, who finished behind him by less than 0.13 of a second, with a time of 4:26.15.

Eight years later, Nazar had approved a nationality transfer by FINA to compete for the Turkish team at the 2008 Summer Olympics in Beijing, under a new name Deniz Nazar. He achieved a FINA B-standard entry time of 4:26.64 from the Croatian Open Championships in Dubrovnik. For his third time in the 400 m individual medley, Nazar challenged five other swimmers in heat one, including two-time Olympians Vasilii Danilov of Kyrgyzstan and Hocine Haciane of Andorra. He touched out Haciane to take a fourth spot by a 1.20-second margin with a time of 4:30.80. Nazar failed to qualify for the final, as he placed twenty-eighth overall on the first night of preliminaries.
