= 2010 FINA World Swimming Championships (25 m) – Men's 200 metre butterfly =

Men's 200m Butterfly at the 2010 Short Course Worlds
- Dates: 19 December 2010
- Competitors: 44
- Winning time: 1:51.56

Medalists
| gold medal | Chad le Clos | South Africa |
| silver medal | Kaio Almeida | Brazil |
| bronze medal | László Cseh | Hungary |

The Men's 200 Butterfly at the 10th FINA World Swimming Championships (25 m) was swum on 19 December 2010 in Dubai, United Arab Emirates. 44 individuals swam in the preliminary heats in the morning, with the top-8 finishers advancing to the final that evening.

At the start of the event, the existing World (WR) and Championship records (CR) were:

| | Name | Nation | Time | Location | Date |
|---|---|---|---|---|---|
| WR | Kaio Almeida | Brazil | 1:49.11 | Stockholm | 10 November 2009 |
| CR | Moss Burmester | New Zealand | 1:51.05 | Manchester | 13 April 2008 |

== Results ==
=== Heats ===
| Rank | Heat | Lane | Name | Time | Notes |
|---|---|---|---|---|---|
| 1 | 6 | 1 | László Cseh (HUN) | 1:52.81 | Q |
| 2 | 6 | 8 | Chad le Clos (RSA) | 1:52.91 | Q |
| 3 | 1 | 6 | Wu Peng (CHN) | 1:53.25 | Q |
| 4 | 4 | 5 | Kaio Almeida (BRA) | 1:53.26 | Q |
| 4 | 5 | 7 | Bobby Bollier (USA) | 1:53.26 | Q |
| 6 | 5 | 3 | Jayden Hadler (AUS) | 1:53.27 | Q |
| 7 | 6 | 5 | Chris Wright (AUS) | 1:53.52 | Q |
| 8 | 4 | 3 | Marcin Cieślak (POL) | 1:53.76 | Q |
| 9 | 6 | 4 | Paweł Korzeniowski (POL) | 1:53.77 | |
| 10 | 5 | 8 | Shaune Fraser (CAY) | 1:53.80 | |
| 11 | 6 | 6 | Duarte Mourão (POR) | 1:53.82 | |
| 12 | 4 | 4 | Joeri Verlinden (NED) | 1:53.86 | |
| 13 | 5 | 4 | Dinko Jukić (AUT) | 1:53.92 | |
| 14 | 5 | 6 | Tyler Clary (USA) | 1:54.41 | |
| 15 | 4 | 6 | Leonardo de Deus (BRA) | 1:54.43 | |
| 16 | 6 | 3 | Omar Pinzón (COL) | 1:54.64 | |
| 17 | 4 | 2 | Robert Žbogar (SLO) | 1:54.73 | |
| 18 | 5 | 1 | Hsu Chi-Chieh (TPE) | 1:55.03 | |
| 19 | 6 | 7 | Dávid Verrasztó (HUN) | 1:55.06 | |
| 20 | 5 | 2 | Simon Sjödin (SWE) | 1:55.21 | |
| 21 | 4 | 1 | Ioannis Drymonakos (GRE) | 1:55.87 | |
| 22 | 6 | 2 | Jan Šefl (CZE) | 1:56.25 | |
| 23 | 5 | 5 | Gal Nevo (ISR) | 1:56.66 | |
| 24 | 1 | 3 | Alon Mandel (ISR) | 1:56.67 | |
| 25 | 3 | 2 | Velimir Stjepanović (SRB) | 1:57.18 | |
| 26 | 4 | 7 | Nuno Quintanilha (POR) | 1:57.61 | |
| 27 | 3 | 4 | Norbert Trudman (SVK) | 1:59.26 | |
| 28 | 2 | 5 | Mauricio Fiol (PER) | 1:59.45 | |
| 29 | 3 | 1 | Marawan Hellal (EGY) | 1:59.49 | |
| 30 | 2 | 4 | Grant Beahan (ZIM) | 1:59.79 | |
| 31 | 4 | 8 | Andres Montoya (COL) | 1:59.94 | |
| 32 | 3 | 8 | Javier Hernández (HON) | 1:59.99 | |
| 33 | 3 | 5 | Yousef Alaskari (KUW) | 2:03.24 | |
| 34 | 3 | 6 | Pedro Miguel Pinotes (ANG) | 2:05.06 | |
| 35 | 2 | 1 | Lim Duan Le Kenneth (SIN) | 2:08.39 | |
| 36 | 2 | 7 | Neil Agius (MLT) | 2:10.39 | |
| 37 | 2 | 2 | Ali Al Kaabi (UAE) | 2:10.69 | |
| 38 | 2 | 3 | Nuno Miguel Rola (ANG) | 2:11.10 | |
| 39 | 2 | 6 | Sofyan El Gadi (LBA) | 2:19.06 | |
| 40 | 2 | 8 | Anderson Lim Chee Wei (BRU) | 2:20.51 | |
| – | 1 | 4 | Chen Weiwu (CHN) | DNS | |
| – | 1 | 5 | Clément Lefert (FRA) | DNS | |
| – | 3 | 3 | Alexander Broberg Skeltved (NOR) | DNS | |
| – | 3 | 7 | Jason Dunford (KEN) | DNS | |

=== Final ===
| Rank | Lane | Name | Time | Notes |
|---|---|---|---|---|
| 1st place, gold medalist(s) | 5 | Chad le Clos (RSA) | 1:51.56 | |
| 2nd place, silver medalist(s) | 6 | Kaio Almeida (BRA) | 1:51.61 | |
| 3rd place, bronze medalist(s) | 4 | László Cseh (HUN) | 1:51.67 | |
| 4 | 1 | Chris Wright (AUS) | 1:51.85 | |
| 5 | 3 | Wu Peng (CHN) | 1:51.92 | |
| 6 | 8 | Marcin Cieślak (POL) | 1:53.09 | |
| 7 | 2 | Bobby Bollier (USA) | 1:53.61 | |
| 7 | 7 | Jayden Hadler (AUS) | 1:53.61 | |
