= Colin Bensadon =

Gibraltarian swimmer

Personal information
- Full name: Colin Samuel Bensadon
- Born: 20 January 1988 (age 38) Gibraltar

Sport
- Sport: Swimming
- Strokes: freestyle, butterfly, medley
Medal record
Island Games
Silver medal – second place	2013 Bermuda	400 m medley
Bronze medal – third place	2005 Shetland	400 m medley
Bronze medal – third place	2007 Rhodes	400 m medley
Bronze medal – third place	2009 Åland	400 m medley
Bronze medal – third place	2013 Bermuda	200 m breaststroke
- Updated on 9 January 2014

Colin Samuel Bensadon (born 20 January 1988) is a Gibraltarian swimmer.

== Swimming career ==
=== International competitions ===
Bensadon was born in Gibraltar, and first competed internationally at the 2002 Commonwealth Games in Manchester where he finished 9th in the 1500 metre freestyle covering the distance in 17:34.69, 18th in the 200-metre freestyle with a time of 2:08.24 and 16th in 400-metre freestyle clocking in at 4:27.73.

At the 2003 Island Games in Guernsey, Bensadon finished 8th in the heats of the 400-metre freestyle in 4:18.49 (only the top six progressed to the final), 11th in the 400-metre individual medley in 4:56.42 and swam in the 1500 metre freestyle. He teamed up with Gavin Santos, Daniel Victory and Jamie Zammitt who together finished 8th in the 4 × 50-metre medley relay in 1:59.02 and finished 7th in the heats of the 4 × 100-metre medley relay in 4:20.80. In the final event of the meet Bensadon teamed up with Asha Andrew, Rachel Fortunato, Angel Gonzalez, Elaine Reyes, Arianne Sanguinetti, Gavin Santos and Daniel Victory in the mixed 8 × 50-metre freestyle relay where they finished 6th in the final with a time of 3:46.16.

At the 2005 Island Games in Shetland, Scotland, Bensadon finished 6th in the 400-metre freestyle in 4:14.97, 5th in the timed final of the 1500 metre freestyle in 17:12.85, won bronze in the 400 individual medley in 4:40.52. The team of Bensadon, Merlin Batchelor, Santos and Zammitt competing in four relays together finishing 6th in the final of the 4 × 50-metre freestyle relay in 1:43.95, 6th in the final of the 4 × 100-metre freestyle relay in 3:48.82, and 6th in the final of the 4 × 50-metre medley relay in 1:55.99. The team also qualified for the final of the 4 × 100-metre medley relay, finishing 6th in the heats with a time of 4:17.69 but did not contest the final.

At the 2006 Commonwealth Games in Melbourne, Bensadon finished 16th in 400-metre freestyle in 4:17.22, 26th in 200-metre freestyle in 1:59.98, 17th in 200-metre individual medley in 2:14.07 and was disqualified in the 400-metre individual medley.

At the 2007 World Aquatics Championships held 12 months later in Melbourne, Bensadon finished 64th in the 400-metre freestyle in 4:19.86, 91st in the 200-metre freestyle in 2:01.20, 44th in the 400-metre individual medley in 4:48.26 and 61st in the 200-metre individual medley in 2:16.12.

At the 2007 Island Games in Rhodes, Greece, Bensadon finished 6th in the 200-metre freestyle in 1:58.83, 7th in the 200-metre breaststroke in 2:31.37, 4th in the 400-metre freestyle in 4:09.37, 4th in the 200-metre individual medley in 2:10.48 and won bronze in the 400-metre individual medley in 4:35.31.

At the 2008 FINA World Swimming Championships (25 m) in Manchester, Bensadon finished in 72nd in the 100-metre freestyle in 54.02, 54th in the 200-metre freestyle in 1:56.53, 33rd in the 400-metre individual medley in 4:43.15 and 39th in the 400-metre freestyle in 4:08.56.

At the 2009 Island Games in Åland, Finland, Bensadon finished 4th in the final of the 200-metre butterfly in 2:08.96, 9th in the 200-metre individual medley in 2:13.82, 6th in the 200-metre freestyle in 1:58.14, 6th in the heats of the 200-metre backstroke in 2:14.54 but did not swim in the final, 5th in the 400-metre freestyle in 4:04.78 and won bronze in the 400-metre individual medley in 4:31.89 for the third time. In the relays, Bensadon alongside Oliver Quick, Gavin Santos and Matthew Sivers finished 8th in the 4 × 50-metre freestyle relay in 1:43.11 and 9th in the 4 × 100-metre freestyle relay in 3:47.54 and alongside Oliver Quick, Matthew Sivers and Daniel Victory finished 8th in the 4 × 50-metre medley relay in 1:55.14 and 5th in the 4 × 100-metre medley relay in 4:09.78.

At the 2009 World Aquatics Championships in Rome, Bensadon finished 68th in the 400-metre freestyle in 4:12.31, 110th in the 200-metre freestyle in 2:00.19, 152nd in the 100-metre freestyle in 54.94, 140th in the 100-metre butterfly in 1:00.56, 57th in the 400-metre individual medley in 4:47.14 and 77th in the 200-metre individual medley in 2:14.05.

At the 2010 Commonwealth Games in Delhi, Bensadon had the honour of being the flag bearer at the opening ceremony. In the pool, Bensadon finished 22nd in the 400-metre freestyle in 4:17.63, 28th in the 200-metre freestyle in 2:00.32, 36th in the 100-metre freestyle in 55.88, 28th in the 100-metre butterfly in 1:01.57, 21st in the 200-metre individual medley in 2:18.49 and was disqualified in the 400-metre individual medley.

At the 2010 FINA World Swimming Championships (25 m) in Dubai, Bensadon finished in 59th in the 200-metre freestyle in 1:56.42, 74th in the 100-metre butterfly in 1:00.07, 89th in the 50-metre freestyle in 25.28, 47th in the 200-metre individual medley in 2:11.50, 81st in the 50-metre butterfly in 27.25, equal 79th in the 100-metre freestyle in 53.52 and 61st in the 100-metre individual medley in 1:01.18.

At the 2011 Island Games in the Isle of Wight, Bensadon finished 7th in the heats of the 200-metre butterfly in 2:12.66 (only the top six progressed to the final), 4th in the 200-metre individual medley in 2:10.04, 4th in the 400-metre individual medley in 4:33.69, 7th in the heats of the 100-metre individual medley in 1:02.15 and 4th in the 400-metre freestyle in 4:08.33. In the freestyle relays, Bensadon with Oliver Quick, James Sanderson and Wesley Warwick finished 6th in the 4 × 50-metre freestyle relay in 1:40.66, and with John Paul Llanelo, Quick and Sanderson finished 6th in the 4 × 100 relay in 3:41.83. In the medley relays, Bensadon teamed up with Jordan Gonzalez, Sanderson and Quick. They finished 7th in the heats of the 4 × 50-metre medley relay in 1:52.79 and finished 6th in the final of the 4 × 100-metre medley relay in 4:06.38.

At the 2012 FINA World Swimming Championships (25 m) in Istanbul, Bensadon finished in 45th in the 100-metre individual medley in 59.95, 71st in the 100-metre breaststroke in 1:05.94, 42nd in the 200-metre individual medley in 2:07.88 and with Sanderson, Quick and Michael Hitchcock finished 16th in the 4 × 200-metre freestyle relay in 8:04.92.

At the 2013 Island Games in Bermuda, Bensadon had his most successful meet to date winning silver in the 400-metre individual medley in 4:30.97, his fourth medal in the event at the Island Games and picked a bronze in the 200-metre breaststroke with a time of 2:22.12. In the other events, Bensadon finished 4th in the 200-metre individual medley in 2:08.62, 5th in the 100-metre breaststroke in 1:05.58, 8th in the 50-metre breaststroke in 30.86 and 7th in the heats of the 200-metre backstroke in 2:14.99 but did not swim in the final. In the relay, Bensadon with Llanelo, Sanderson and Quick finished 7th in the 4 × 50-metre freestyle relay in 1:40.39 and with Hitchcock, Sanderson and Quick finished 7th in the 4 × 100-metre freestyle relay in 3:40.12. In the medley, Bensadon, Gonzalez, Sanderson and Quick together finished 6th in both the 4 × 50 and the 4 × 100-metre medley relays with times of 1:49.65 and 4:02.00 respectively.

In 2014, Bensadon participated in the 2014 Glasgow Commonwealth Games. In the 100m breaststroke he finished 29th with a time of 1:11.55. In the 200m breaststroke he finished 18th with a time of 2:35.61. In the 200m freestyle he finished 29th with a time of 2:00.99. In the 200m Individual medley he finished 18th with a time of 2:13.74. His last race was the 50m Breastroke where he finished 29th with a time of 31.90.

In 2015, Bensadon competed in the 2015 Island Games held in Jersey. At this meet he made almost every final in the races he participated. In the 200m individual medley he finished 7th in the final with a time of 2:10.08. In the 400m Individual Medley he finished 6th in the final with a time of 4:33.67. In the 200m breaststroke he finished 7th with a time of 2:28.39. His team also made 4 relays.

In 2016, Bensadon attended the 2016 FINA World Swimming Championships in Windsor.

In 2017, Bensadon attended the 2017 Island Games held in Gotland.

=== Endurance Race ===
Colin has dominated this local Gibraltar race for years, having won the race 13 times from the start of his career to 2016. The swim is an open water race which traditionally started at one end of Eastern Beach and ended in Caleta beach in Gibraltar. In 2016, the route was changed to a loop starting and ending at the GASA pavilion.

=== Life Time Achievements ===
In 2014 Colin was nominated for GBC Sports Personality of the Year 2013 for being a double medalist in the Bermuda Island Games 2013 and another Endurance swim win in the summer 2014. His unprecedented achievements in swimming in Gibraltar was recognized when he went on to win this award. In 2016, his 21 year long swimming career was celebrated by the Gibraltar Chronicle where Colin explained that Gibraltar Amateur Swimming Association (GASA) is more than just a pool for him, admitting this is where he made lifelong relationships and how his involvement in GASA has shaped the person he is today. Colin received praise from all areas of the sporting community, such as a local triathlete stating that 'In one of the toughest sports he is an outstanding role model for any swimmer to follow and I am sure his records will be tough to beat'.

Colin is also the only Gibraltarian to qualify for 5 Commonwealth Games in his discipline. The 5th Commonwealth Games he qualified for was the 2018 Gold Coast games, where he had to drop out with very short notice due to the imminent birth of his son.

== Personal life ==
Bensadon was born in St Bernard's Hospital in Gibraltar in 1988. He was selected to be House Captain in his secondary school. He earned an Accounting and Finance Degree at Russel Group University where he attained a 2:1. At the age of 18 he met his future wife whilst working as a lifeguard at the local GASA swimming pool. They married 7 years later and in 2018 had a child together.
