= László Cseh =

Hungarian swimmer (born 1985)

László Cseh OLY
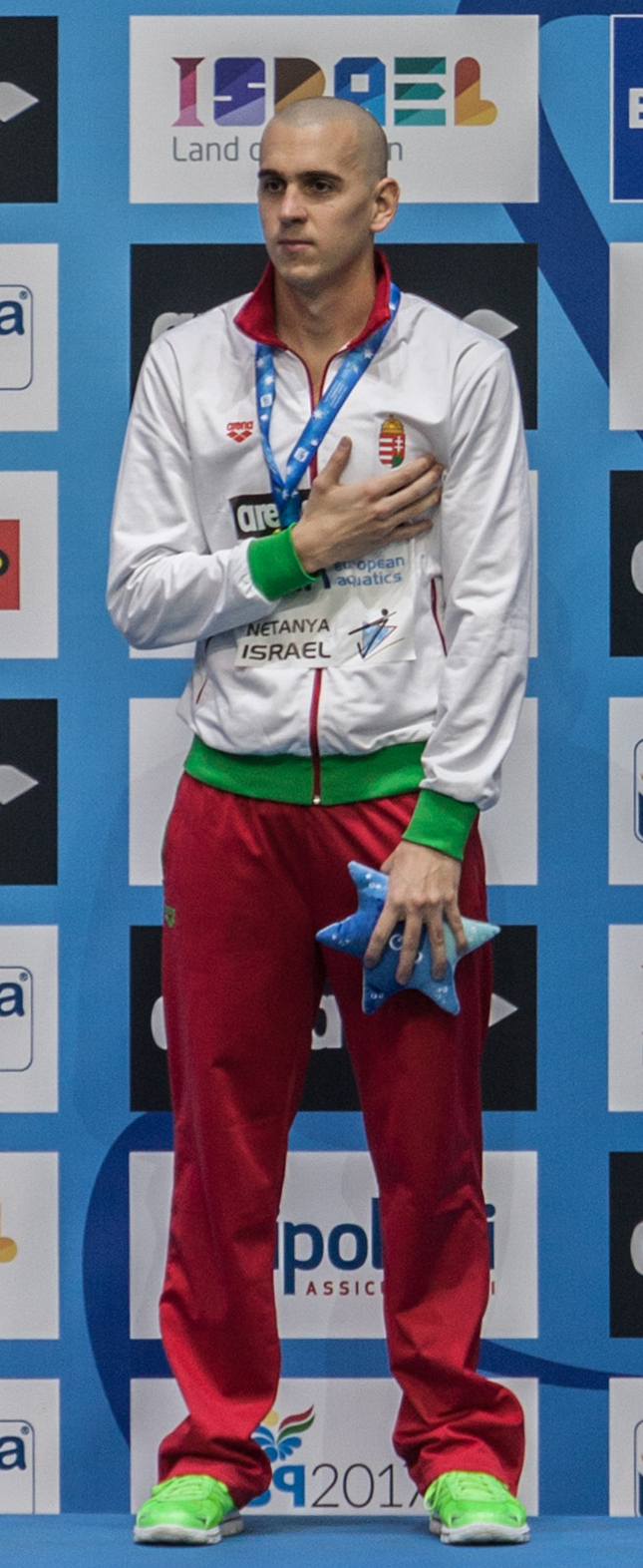

Personal information
- National team: Hungary
- Born: 3 December 1985 (age 40) Budapest, Hungary
- Height: 1.88 m (6 ft 2 in)
- Weight: 82 kg (181 lb)
- Website: CsehLaszlo.hu

Sport
- Sport: Swimming
- Strokes: Individual medley, butterfly, backstroke
- Club: Bp. Spartacus ( –2005); Kőbánya SC (2005–14); Egri ÚK (2015–19); BVSC-Zugló (2019– )
- Coach: Miklós Kiss; György Túri (1997–2014); Zsolt Plagányi (2014– )
Medal record
Men's swimming
Representing Hungary
Event	1st	2nd	3rd
Olympic Games	0	4	2
World Championships (LC)	2	6	5
World Championships (SC)	0	2	2
European Championships (LC)	14	4	5
European Championships (SC)	19	3	3
Universiade	3	0	0
Total	38	19	17
Olympic Games
Silver medal – second place	2008 Beijing	200 m butterfly
Silver medal – second place	2008 Beijing	200 m medley
Silver medal – second place	2008 Beijing	400 m medley
Silver medal – second place	2016 Rio de Janeiro	100 m butterfly
Bronze medal – third place	2004 Athens	400 m medley
Bronze medal – third place	2012 London	200 m medley
World Championships (LC)
Gold medal – first place	2005 Montreal	400 m medley
Gold medal – first place	2015 Kazan	200 m butterfly
Silver medal – second place	2003 Barcelona	400 m medley
Silver medal – second place	2005 Montreal	200 m medley
Silver medal – second place	2009 Rome	200 m medley
Silver medal – second place	2013 Barcelona	100 m butterfly
Silver medal – second place	2015 Kazan	100 m butterfly
Silver medal – second place	2017 Budapest	200 m butterfly
Bronze medal – third place	2005 Montreal	100 m backstroke
Bronze medal – third place	2007 Melbourne	200 m medley
Bronze medal – third place	2009 Rome	400 m medley
Bronze medal – third place	2011 Shanghai	200 m medley
Bronze medal – third place	2015 Kazan	50 m butterfly
World Championships (SC)
Silver medal – second place	2012 Istanbul	200 m butterfly
Silver medal – second place	2012 Istanbul	400 m medley
Bronze medal – third place	2010 Dubai	200 m butterfly
Bronze medal – third place	2012 Istanbul	200 m medley
European Championships (LC)
Gold medal – first place	2004 Madrid	100 m backstroke
Gold medal – first place	2004 Madrid	400 m medley
Gold medal – first place	2006 Budapest	200 m medley
Gold medal – first place	2006 Budapest	400 m medley
Gold medal – first place	2008 Eindhoven	200 m medley
Gold medal – first place	2008 Eindhoven	400 m medley
Gold medal – first place	2010 Budapest	200 m medley
Gold medal – first place	2010 Budapest	400 m medley
Gold medal – first place	2012 Debrecen	200 m butterfly
Gold medal – first place	2012 Debrecen	200 m medley
Gold medal – first place	2012 Debrecen	400 m medley
Gold medal – first place	2014 Berlin	200 m medley
Gold medal – first place	2016 London	100 m butterfly
Gold medal – first place	2016 London	200 m butterfly
Silver medal – second place	2006 Budapest	200 m backstroke
Silver medal – second place	2012 Debrecen	100 m butterfly
Silver medal – second place	2014 Berlin	100 m butterfly
Silver medal – second place	2016 London	50 m butterfly
Bronze medal – third place	2004 Madrid	4×100 m medley
Bronze medal – third place	2012 Debrecen	4×200 m freestyle
Bronze medal – third place	2012 Debrecen	4×100 m medley
Bronze medal – third place	2014 Berlin	4×100 m medley
Bronze medal – third place	2016 London	4×100 m medley
European Championships (SC)
Gold medal – first place	2003 Dublin	400 m medley
Gold medal – first place	2004 Vienna	400 m medley
Gold medal – first place	2005 Trieste	100 m backstroke
Gold medal – first place	2005 Trieste	200 m medley
Gold medal – first place	2005 Trieste	400 m medley
Gold medal – first place	2006 Helsinki	200 m medley
Gold medal – first place	2007 Debrecen	200 m medley
Gold medal – first place	2007 Debrecen	400 m medley
Gold medal – first place	2007 Debrecen	200 m butterfly
Gold medal – first place	2009 Istanbul	400 m medley
Gold medal – first place	2011 Szczecin	200 m butterfly
Gold medal – first place	2011 Szczecin	200 m medley
Gold medal – first place	2011 Szczecin	400 m medley
Gold medal – first place	2012 Chartres	200 m butterfly
Gold medal – first place	2012 Chartres	200 m medley
Gold medal – first place	2012 Chartres	400 m medley
Gold medal – first place	2015 Netanya	100 m butterfly
Gold medal – first place	2015 Netanya	200 m butterfly
Gold medal – first place	2015 Netanya	200 m medley
Silver medal – second place	2004 Vienna	200 m medley
Silver medal – second place	2006 Helsinki	400 m medley
Silver medal – second place	2006 Helsinki	200 m butterfly
Bronze medal – third place	2002 Riesa	400 m medley
Bronze medal – third place	2004 Vienna	100 m backstroke
Bronze medal – third place	2011 Szczecin	200 m freestyle
Universiade
Gold medal – first place	2011 Shenzhen	200 m butterfly
Gold medal – first place	2011 Shenzhen	200 m medley
Gold medal – first place	2011 Shenzhen	400 m medley

László Cseh (pronounced [ˈlaːsloː ˈt͡ʃɛ]; born 3 December 1985) is a retired Hungarian competitive swimmer and six-time Olympic medalist. He is a 33-time European Champion. His father, László Cseh Sr., also represented Hungary at the Olympics in swimming. In 2020, Braden Keith of SwimSwam nominated him as number 1 within top 10 male swimmers who have never won Olympic gold.

== Personal life ==
The son of an Olympic swimmer, Cseh started swimming competitively at an early age. Cseh is coached by György Turi and Zoltán Nemes. He holds a scholarship with the Olympic Solidarity programme.

== Swimming career ==
At the 2003 World Championships, Cseh captured a silver medal in the 400 m individual medley, his first medal at the highest level. He also finished 7th and 13th in the 100 and 200 metres backstroke, all in national record time.

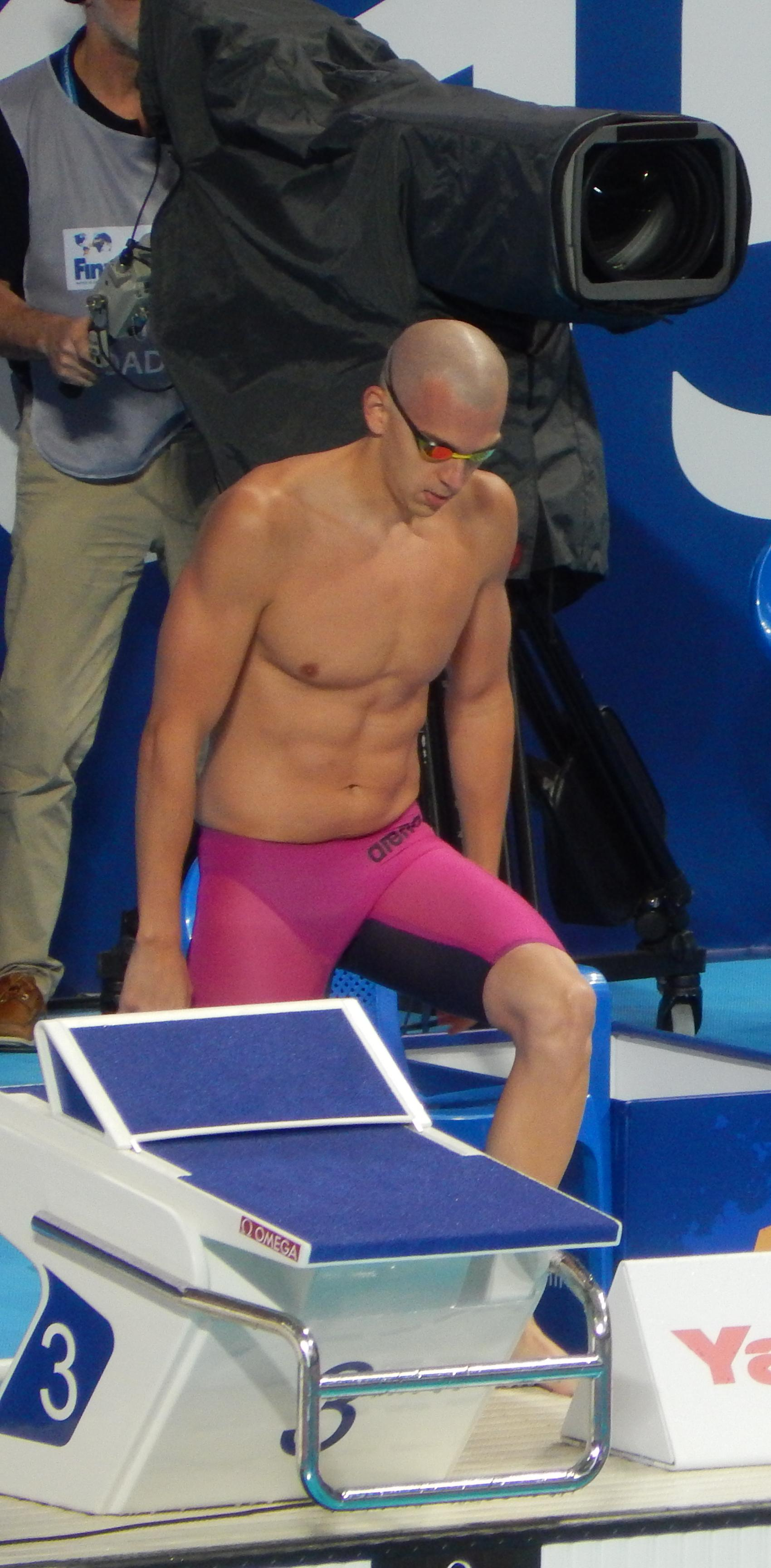
Kazan 2015

=== 2004 Olympics ===
Cseh represented Hungary at the 2004 Summer Olympics in Athens, Greece in the 400 m individual medley, 100 m backstroke, and the 200 m individual medley, despite having broken his ankle in the training camp on a stairway a couple of weeks before. Nevertheless, he won a bronze medal in the 400 m individual medley as well as coming in fourth in the 200 m individual medley, and sixth in the 100 m backstroke.

At the 2005 World Championships, Cseh not only improved his national records, he excelled further up in the world rankings, and entered the meet as a serious medal contender in 3 events. After Michael Phelps backed out of the 400 m individual medley, Cseh picked up his first gold medal at the world championships.

Cseh failed to back up his previous performances in the 2007 World Championships, finishing outside the medals in the 400 m individual medley; however he did set a new national record in the 200 m individual medley, along with testing out the 200 m freestyle.

=== 2008 Olympics ===
Cseh represented Hungary at the 2008 Summer Olympics in Beijing in three swimming events: the 400 m individual medley, the 200 m butterfly, and the 200 m individual medley. Despite setting the European record in all of them, he won the silver medal in each and came in second behind American Michael Phelps, who won each event with a new world record. In both individual medleys, Cseh came out ahead of the bronze-medal winner Ryan Lochte.

At the 2009 World Championships, Cseh was rushed to hospital on arrival in Rome, suffering from a stomach virus. A source close to the Hungarian team stated: "He has had to have re hydration and electrolyte drinks but is quite sick." He scratched his first event, the 200 m butterfly, however he did return to competition on day 4 setting a European record in the 200 m individual medley, swimming a touch slower the next night to capture silver, final night of competition saw him take bronze in the 400 m individual medley.

At the 2010 European Championships, Cseh held off Markus Rogan for gold in the 200 m individual medley, winning the event for the third time. Also taking gold in the 400 m individual medley for the fourth time. He scratched the European Short Course Championships to focus on the World Short Course Championships where he won a bronze in the 200 m butterfly.

At the 2011 World Championships, he took bronze in the 200 m individual medley, finished 9th in the 100 m butterfly, and 12th in the 200 m butterfly.

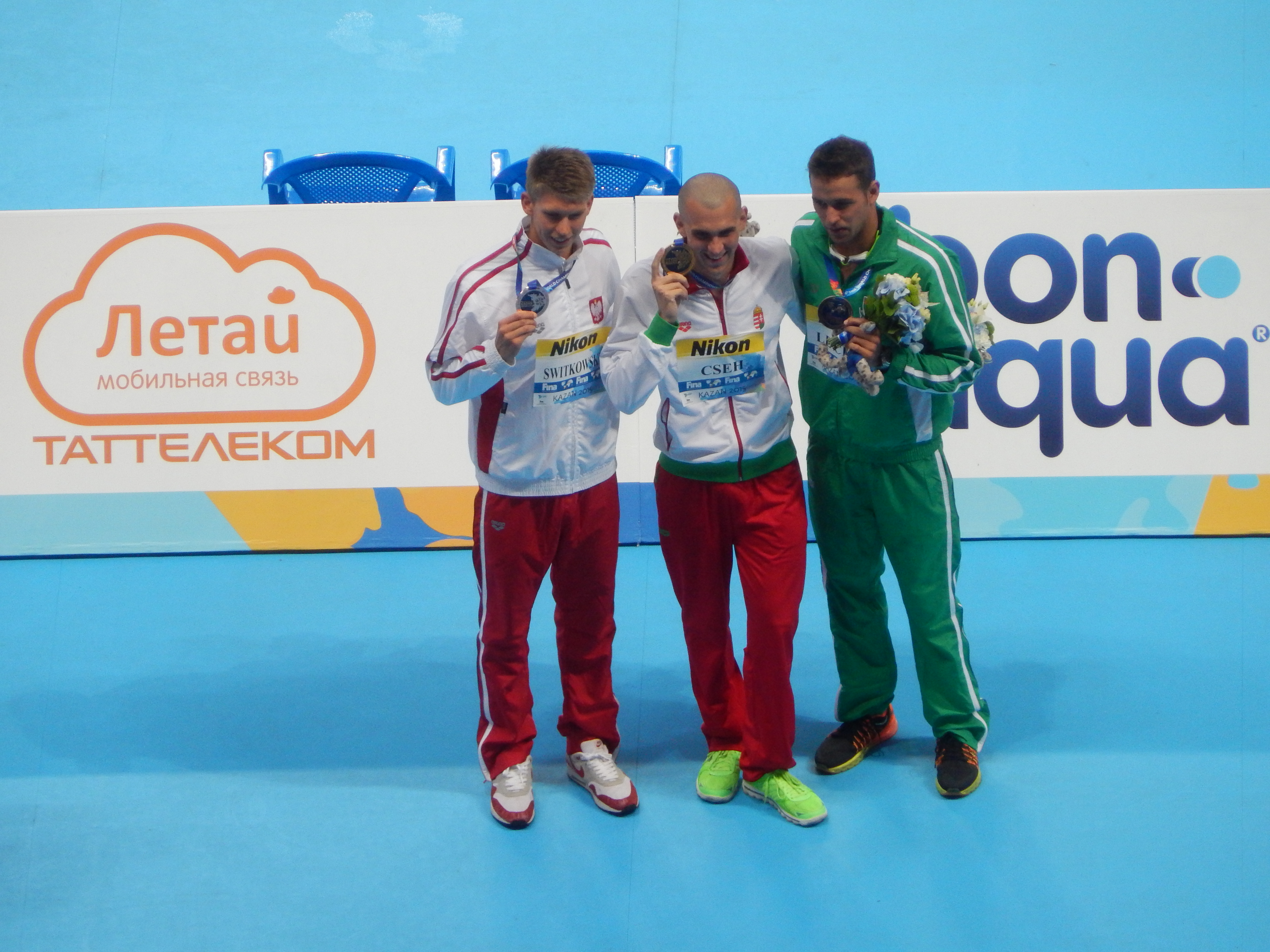
Cseh wins his second World Champs (long course) gold, 10 years after the first

=== 2012 Olympics ===
At the 2012 Olympics, he competed in 6 events: the 200 m butterfly, 200 m individual medley, 400 m individual medley, and the 3 relays. Cseh narrowly failed to reach the final of the 400 meter individual medley, coming in 9th position in the semi-finals. He finished 12th in the 200m butterfly. Cseh did add to his Olympic medal count with a bronze in the 200 meter individual medley, touching the wall in a time of 1:56.22, behind Phelps (gold – 1:54.27) and Lochte (silver – 1:54.90).

At the 2015 World Aquatics Championships, Cseh finally won another gold, 10 years after his first, by winning the 200m butterfly in 1:53.48, 0.2 seconds ahead of Chad le Clos.

=== 2016 Olympics ===
At the 2016 Olympics, he competed in the 100 m and 200 m butterfly, along with the 4 × 100 m medley relay.

In 100 m butterfly he finished 2nd along with rivals Michael Phelps and Chad le Clos, where Singaporean Joseph Schooling won the race with a new Olympic record. Cseh has now won Olympic silver medals in four different events, and he has also won individual medals in four different Olympics.

=== 2020 Olympics ===
At the 2020 Olympics, Laszlo Cseh competed in his fifth and last Olympic games, entering in men's 200m IM only. The 35-year-old Hungarian stopped the clock in a time of 1:57.68 to finish 7th in the race, after the race he announced retirement from competitive swimming, ending his legendary career as 6-time Olympic medalist and 13-time World Champ medalist.

== Career best times ==
=== Long course (50 m pool) ===
Event	Time		Meet	Location	Date	Notes
200 m freestyle	1.45.78	rh	2009 World Championships	Rome, Italy	July 31, 2009	Former NR
400 m freestyle	3:52.16	h	2008 European Championships	Eindhoven, Netherlands	March 18, 2008	
50 m backstroke	25.39		2008 Hungarian National Championships	Budapest, Hungary	July 9, 2008	Former NR
100 m backstroke	53.40	r	2012 Summer Olympics	London, United Kingdom	August 4, 2012	Former NR
200 m backstroke	1:56.69		2006 European Championships	Budapest, Hungary	August 5, 2006	Former NR
50 m butterfly	23.06	sf	2015 World Championships	Kazan, Russia	August 2, 2015	Former NR
100 m butterfly	50.86		2016 European Championships	London, United Kingdom	May 21, 2016	Former NR
200 m butterfly	1:52.70		2008 Summer Olympics	Beijing, China	August 13, 2008	Former ER
200 m individual medley	1:55.18	sf	2009 World Championships	Rome, Italy	July 29, 2009	Former ER
400 m individual medley	4:06.16		2008 Summer Olympics	Beijing, China	July 29, 2009	NR, Former ER

Legend: ER – European record; NR – Hungarian record; e – equalled existing record;
Records not set in finals: h – heat; sf – semifinal; r – relay 1st leg; rh – relay heat 1st leg; b – B final; † – en route to final mark; so – swim-off; tt – time trial

=== Short course (25 m pool) ===
Event	Time		Meet	Location	Date	Notes
200 m freestyle	1.41.64		2009 European Short Course Championships	Istanbul, Turkey	December 13, 2009	Former NR
400 m freestyle	3:40.69		2007 Hungarian Short Course Championships	Debrecen, Hungary	November 16, 2007	Former NR
50 m backstroke	24.31		2009 Hungarian Short Course Championships	Százhalombatta, Hungary	November 13, 2009	Former NR
100 m backstroke	51.29		2005 European Short Course Championships	Trieste, Italy	December 11, 2005	Former NR
200 m backstroke	1:53.42		2003 European Short Course Championships	Dublin, Ireland	December 11, 2003	Former NR
50 m butterfly	22.88	sf	2017 European Short Course Championships	Copenhagen, Denmark	December 16, 2017	Former NR
100 m butterfly	49.33		2015 European Short Course Championships	Netanya, Israel	December 3, 2015	NR
200 m butterfly	1:49.00		2015 European Short Course Championships	Netanya, Israel	December 6, 2015	NR, Former ER
100 m individual medley	53.11		2012 World Cup	Berlin, Germany	October 20, 2012	Former NR
200 m individual medley	1.51.36		2015 European Short Course Championships	Netanya, Israel	December 4, 2015	NR, Former ER
400 m individual medley	3:57.27		2009 European Short Course Championships	Istanbul, Turkey	December 11, 2009	NR, Former WR

Legend: WR – World record; ER – European record; NR – Hungarian record; e – equalled existing record;
Records not set in finals: h – heat; sf – semifinal; r – relay 1st leg; rh – relay heat 1st leg; b – B final; † – en route to final mark; so – swim-off; tt – time trial

== Records ==
=== World records ===
Cseh has set 5 world records throughout his career. All of the records were individually set in a short course (25-meter) pool.

==== Short course (25 m pool) ====
No.	Event	Time	Meet	Location	Date	Status
1	200 m individual medley	1:53.46	2005 European Short Course Championships	Trieste, Italy	December 8, 2005	Former
2	400 m individual medley	4:00.37	2005 European Short Course Championships	Trieste, Italy	December 9, 2005	Former
3	200 m individual medley (2)	1:52.99	2007 European Short Course Championships	Debrecen, Hungary	December 13, 2007	Former
4	400 m individual medley (2)	3:59.33	2007 European Short Course Championships	Debrecen, Hungary	December 14, 2007	Former
5	400 m individual medley (3)	3:57.27	2009 European Short Course Championships	Istanbul, Turkey	December 11, 2009	Former

=== European records ===
Cseh has set 22 European records throughout his career, with 12 set in a long course (50-meter) pool and 10 in a short course (25-meter) pool. All of the records were set individually.

==== Long course (50 m pool) ====
No.	Event	Time		Meet	Location	Date	Status
1	400 m individual medley	4:10.79		2003 World Championships	Barcelona, Spain	July 27, 2003	Former
2	400 m individual medley (2)	4:10.10		2005 Mare Nostrum – Meeting Arena de Canet-en-Roussillon	Canet-en-Roussillon, France	June 7, 2005	Former
3	200 m individual medley	1:57.61		2005 World Championships	Montreal, Canada	July 28, 2005	Former
4	400 m individual medley (3)	4:09.63		2005 World Championships	Montreal, Canada	July 31, 2005	Former
5	200 m individual medley (2)	1:56.92		2007 World Championships	Melbourne, Australia	March 29, 2007	Former
6	400 m individual medley (4)	4:09.59		2008 European Championships	Eindhoven, Netherlands	March 24, 2008	Former
7	400 m individual medley (5)	4:07.96		2008 Mare Nostrum – Meeting Arena de Canet-en-Roussillon	Canet-en-Roussillon, France	June 14, 2008	Former
8	400 m individual medley (6)	4:06.16		2008 Summer Olympics	Beijing, China	August 10, 2008	Former
9	200 m butterfly	1:52.70		2008 Summer Olympics	Beijing, China	August 13, 2008	Former
10	200 m individual medley (3)	1:56.52		2008 Summer Olympics	Beijing, China	August 15, 2008	Former
11	200 m individual medley (4)	1:56.34	h	2009 World Championships	Rome, Italy	July 29, 2009	Former
12	200 m individual medley (5)	1:55.18	sf	2009 World Championships	Rome, Italy	July 29, 2009	Former

Legend: e – equalled existing record;
Records not set in finals: h – heat; sf – semifinal; r – relay 1st leg; rh – relay heat 1st leg; b – B final; † – en route to final mark; so – swim-off; tt – time trial

==== Short course (25 m pool) ====
No.	Event	Time	Meet	Location	Date	Status	Notes
1	400 m individual medley	4:04.10	2003 European Short Course Championships	Dublin, Ireland	December 12, 2003	Former	
2	400 m individual medley (2)	4:03.96	2004 European Short Course Championships	Vienna, Austria	December 10, 2004	Former	
3	200 m individual medley	1:53.46	2005 European Short Course Championships	Trieste, Italy	December 8, 2005	Former	Former WR
4	400 m individual medley (3)	4:00.37	2005 European Short Course Championships	Trieste, Italy	December 9, 2005	Former	Former WR
5	200 m individual medley (2)	1:52.99	2007 European Short Course Championships	Debrecen, Hungary	December 13, 2007	Former	Former WR
6	400 m individual medley (4)	3:59.33	2007 European Short Course Championships	Debrecen, Hungary	December 14, 2007	Former	Former WR
7	200 m individual medley (3)	1:52.85	2009 Hungarian Short Course Championships	Százhalombatta, Hungary	November 13, 2009	Former	
8	400 m individual medley (5)	3:57.27	2009 European Short Course Championships	Istanbul, Turkey	December 11, 2009	Former	Former WR
9	200 m individual medley (4)	1:51.36	2015 European Short Course Championships	Netanya, Israel	December 4, 2015	Former	
10	200 m butterfly	1:49.00	2015 European Short Course Championships	Netanya, Israel	December 6, 2015	Former	

Legend: WR – World record; e – equalled existing record;
Records not set in finals: h – heat; sf – semifinal; r – relay 1st leg; rh – relay heat 1st leg; b – B final; † – en route to final mark; so – swim-off; tt – time trial

== Awards ==
- Hungarian swimmer of the Year (9): 2003, 2005, 2006, 2007, 2008, 2010, 2014, 2015, 2016
- Cross of Merit of the Republic of Hungary – Golden Cross (2004)
- Swimming World Magazine – European Swimmer of the Year (2): 2005, 2006
- Hungarian Athlete of the Year (1) - the National Sports Association (NSSZ) awards: 2006
- Budapest Pro Urbe award (2006)
- Hungarian Sportsman of the Year (2) - votes of sports journalists: 2006, 2015
- Junior Príma award (2007)
- Order of Merit of the Republic of Hungary – Officer's Cross (2008)
- Honorary Citizen of Balatonalmádi (2008)
- Príma Primissima award (2009)
- Honorary Citizen of Kőbánya (2011)
- Order of Merit of Hungary – Commander's Cross (2012)
- Hungarian university athlete of the year (1): 2015
- Hungarian Heritage Award (2015)
- European swimmer of the year (LEN) (2015)
- Honorary Citizen of Eger (2016)
- Order of Merit of Hungary – Commander's Cross with Star (2016)

Records
Preceded by George Bovell	Men's 200-metre individual medley world record-holder (short course); 8 December 2005 – 7 April 2006	Succeeded by Ryan Lochte
Preceded by Thiago Pereira	Men's 200-metre individual medley world record-holder (short course); 13 December 2007 – 11 April 2008	Succeeded by Ryan Lochte
Preceded by Brian Johns	Men's 400-metre individual medley world record-holder (short course); 9 December 2005 – 16 December 2010	Succeeded by Ryan Lochte
Awards
Preceded by Ákos Braun; Krisztián Berki	Hungarian Sportsman of The Year; 2006; 2015	Succeeded by Gábor Talmácsi; Áron Szilágyi
Preceded by Pieter van den Hoogenband	European Swimmer of the Year; 2005–2006	Succeeded by Mateusz Sawrymowicz
Sporting positions
Preceded by Camelia Potec	Mare Nostrum Tour Overall Winner; 2005	Succeeded by Leisel Jones
Olympic Games
Preceded by Áron Szilágyi	Flagbearer for Hungary (with Aida Mohamed); Tokyo 2020	Succeeded by Blanka Bíró; Krisztián Tóth
