= Adam Lucas =

Australian swimmer

Personal information
- Full name: Adam Lucas
- National team: Australia
- Born: 27 October 1983 (age 42) Hobart, Tasmania
- Height: 1.84 m (6 ft 0 in)
- Weight: 74 kg (163 lb)

Sport
- Sport: Swimming
- Strokes: Medley
- Club: West Coast Swim Club
Medal record
Men's swimming
Representing Australia
Universiade
Bronze medal – third place	2003 Daegu	200 m medley

Adam Lucas (born 27 October 1983) is an Australian Olympic swimmer who specialized in individual medley (IM) events. Lucas represented Australia at the 2004 Summer Olympics Games in Athens, Greece, swimming in the 200m IM. Lucas was the Australian Record holder in the Men's short course 100 IM, and won a silver and bronze World Championship medal as a member of 4x200m Freestyle Relay squads at the 2004 World Short Course Championships in Indianapolis, USA, and the 2005 World Championships in Montreal, Canada.

Lucas was the club captain of West Coast Swimming Club in Perth, Western Australia, and was coached by the late Grant Stoelwinder. Lucas retired from swimming in 2008, and in 2011 was inducted into the Swimming Western Australia Hall of Fame.

== Personal ==
Adam Lucas was born on 27 October 1983 in Hobart, Tasmania. Moving to Western Australia in 1995, he attended St Mark’s Anglican Community School in Hillarys, Western Australia, where he was captain of their ACC Swim Team. He graduated from St. Mark's in 2000. Lucas went on to complete a Bachelor of Commerce at the University of Western Australia (UWA) and was awarded the UWA Sports Star of the Year in 2005.

== Swimming career ==
Lucas qualified for the men's 200 m individual medley at the 2004 Summer Olympics in Athens, by clearing a FINA A-standard entry time of 2:01.94 from the 2004 Olympic trials in Sydney. At the Athens OIympics he challenged seven other swimmers on the seventh heat, including top medal favourite Michael Phelps. Lucas raced to seventh place by 0.37 of a second behind three-time Olympian Tamás Kerékjártó of Hungary in 2:02.12, but missed the semifinals by a hundredth of a second (0.01), as he placed seventeenth overall in the preliminaries.

After the 2004 Olympic Games, Lucas represented Australia at the 2004 World Short Course Championships in Indianapolis, USA. Lucas finished 5th in the final of the 400 IM in a time of 4:10.45, and 5th in the final of the 200 IM with a time of 1:57.83, Lucas was also a member of the silver medal winning 4x200m Freestyle Relay team swimming the heats for Australia.

At 2005 World Championship trials in Sydney, Australia, Lucas won five national titles winning the individual medley double with gold in the 200 IM (2:00.98) and 400 IM (4:18.49), and with his West Coast Swimming Club team mates took out the relay treble and won the 4x100m Freestyle relay, 4x200m Freestyle relay and 4x100m Individual Medal relay breaking the Australian club record for the medley relay in a time of 3:41.67.

At the 2005 FINA World Championships in Montreal, Canada, Lucas qualified for the semi-finals of the 200 IM finishing 9th with a time of 2:01.99. Lucas was also a member of the bronze medal winning 4x200m Freestyle relay swimming the heats for Australia.

Lucas sought his bid to qualify for the 2008 Summer Olympics in Beijing. At the 2008 Australian Olympic Trials he finished second behind Leith Brodie in 2:01.84, but failed to attain a FINA A-cut of 2:01.40. Lucas also finished second in the 400 IM in 4:19.07 but was also outside the FINA A-cut off qualifying time. On the same year, Lucas was honoured for his "Speedo Services to the Australian Swimming Team" at the Telstra Swimmer of the Year Awards in Sydney, following his retirement from the sport.

In 2011, Lucas was inducted into the Western Australian Amateur Swimming Association's Hall of Fame.
