= Zhao Tao (swimmer) =

Chinese swimmer

Personal information
- Born: May 5, 1987 (age 39) Anhui, China

Sport
- Sport: Swimming
- Strokes: Medley
Medal record
Representing China
Summer Universiade
Bronze medal – third place	2005 Izmir	200m individual medley

Zhao Tao (born 5 May 1987) is a male Olympic medley swimmer from China. He swam for China at the:

- Olympics: 2004
- World Championships: 2003, 2007
- World University Games: 2005
- Asian Championships: 2006
