= Luca Marin =

Italian swimmer (born 1986)

Luca Marin OLY
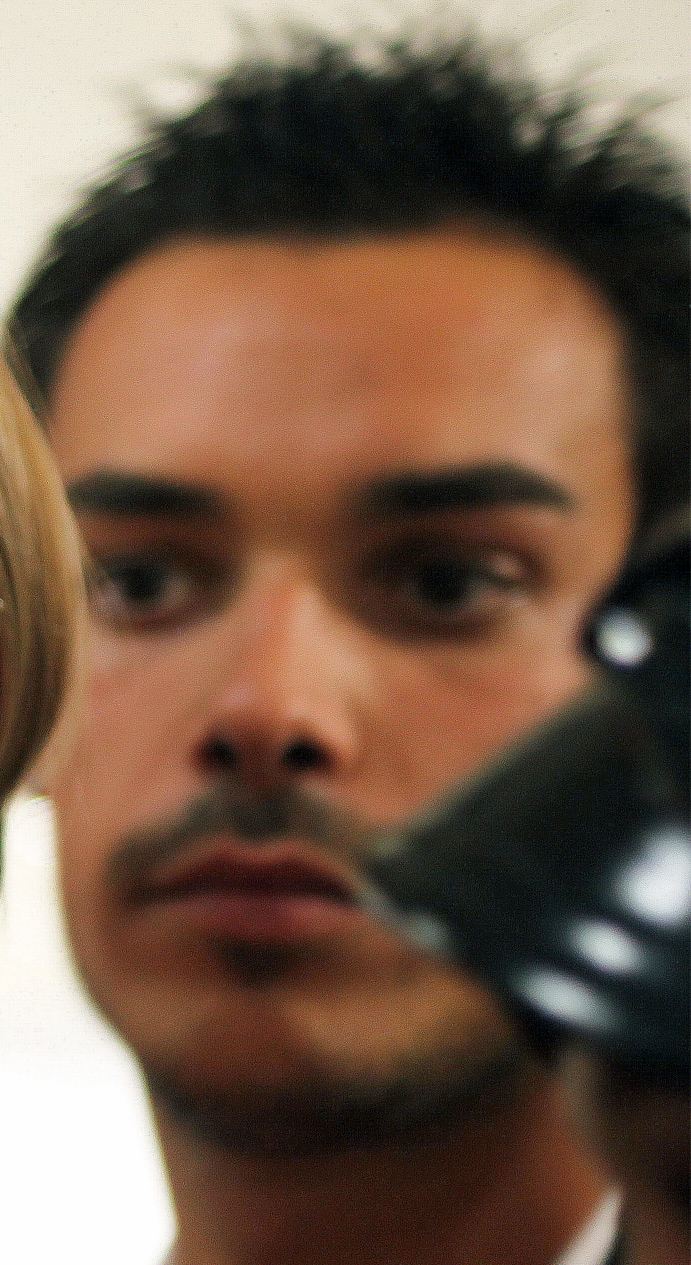

Personal information
- Full name: Luca Marin
- Nationality: Italy
- Born: April 9, 1986 (age 40) Vittoria, Ragusa
- Height: 1.86 m (6 ft 1 in)

Sport
- Sport: Swimming
- Strokes: Medley
- Club: Cooperativa Terranova
Medal record
World Championships (LC)
Silver medal – second place	2005 Montreal	400 m medley
Bronze medal – third place	2007 Melbourne	400 m medley
World Championships (SC)
Silver medal – second place	2006 Shanghai	400 m medley
European Championships (LC)
Silver medal – second place	2004 Madrid	400 m medley
Silver medal – second place	2006 Budapest	400 m medley
Silver medal – second place	2008 Eindhoven	400 m medley
European Championships (SC)
Gold medal – first place	2006 Helsinki	400 m medley
Silver medal – second place	2004 Vienna	400 m medley
Silver medal – second place	2005 Trieste	400 m medley
Silver medal – second place	2007 Debrecen	400 m medley

Luca Marin (born 9 April 1986 in Vittoria, Province of Ragusa) is a former Italian medley swimmer. He specialized in the 400 m medley, and won ten medals at European and World Championships in this event. At the 2006 European Short Course Swimming Championships he won a gold medal, beating László Cseh, the world record holder. At the top of his career, he was trained by the Albanian coach Gjon Shyti.

== Biography ==
He participated at the 2004 Summer Olympics at Athens for Italy, reaching 10th place in the 400 m medley. At the 2008 Summer Olympics he finished in 5th place in the same event, and 12th at the 2012 Summer Olympics.

Luca Marin was engaged to Laure Manaudou and Federica Pellegrini.

== Curiosity ==
Marin represents the Knave (corresponding to the Jack in the Italian playing cards) within the communication code the duo formed by pro players Febo and Rico elaborated for their games since the mid-2000s during the Ossuccio Briscola Tournament.
