= Liu Weijia =

Chinese swimmer

Personal information
- Native name: 刘维佳
- Born: 15 February 1989 (age 37) Shenyang, China

Sport
- Sport: Swimming
- Strokes: Freestyle, medley

Liu Weijia (simplified Chinese: 刘维佳; traditional Chinese: 劉維佳; born 15 February 1989) is a Chinese former freestyle and medley swimmer who competed in the 2004 Summer Olympics.

== Biography ==
Liu is from Shenyang. During the 2003 Five Cities Games (Chinese: 五城会), he received the 200m individual medley bronze medal. In both of the Games' 200m breaststroke and 200m butterfly events that year, he was the fourth place finisher. Stating that all three of his performances were above the B cut for the Olympics qualification standards, Xi'an Evening News said in 2003 that Liu had "a well-rounded skill set and great potential" and would be a contender for the 2008 Summer Olympics. During the FINA World Swimming Championships (25 m) in 2004, Liu was the silver medalist in the 400m individual medley on 21 January and the gold medalist in the 200m individual medley on 22 January. Liu competed in the men's 400 metre individual medley at the 2004 Summer Olympics where he placed 28th.

Liu trained in Japan in 2010. At the 2012 Asian Swimming Championships, he received a bronze medal in the 400m individual medley. During the 2013 East Asian Games, Liu received the bronze medal during the 400m individual medley.
