= Chris Christensen =

Danish swimmer

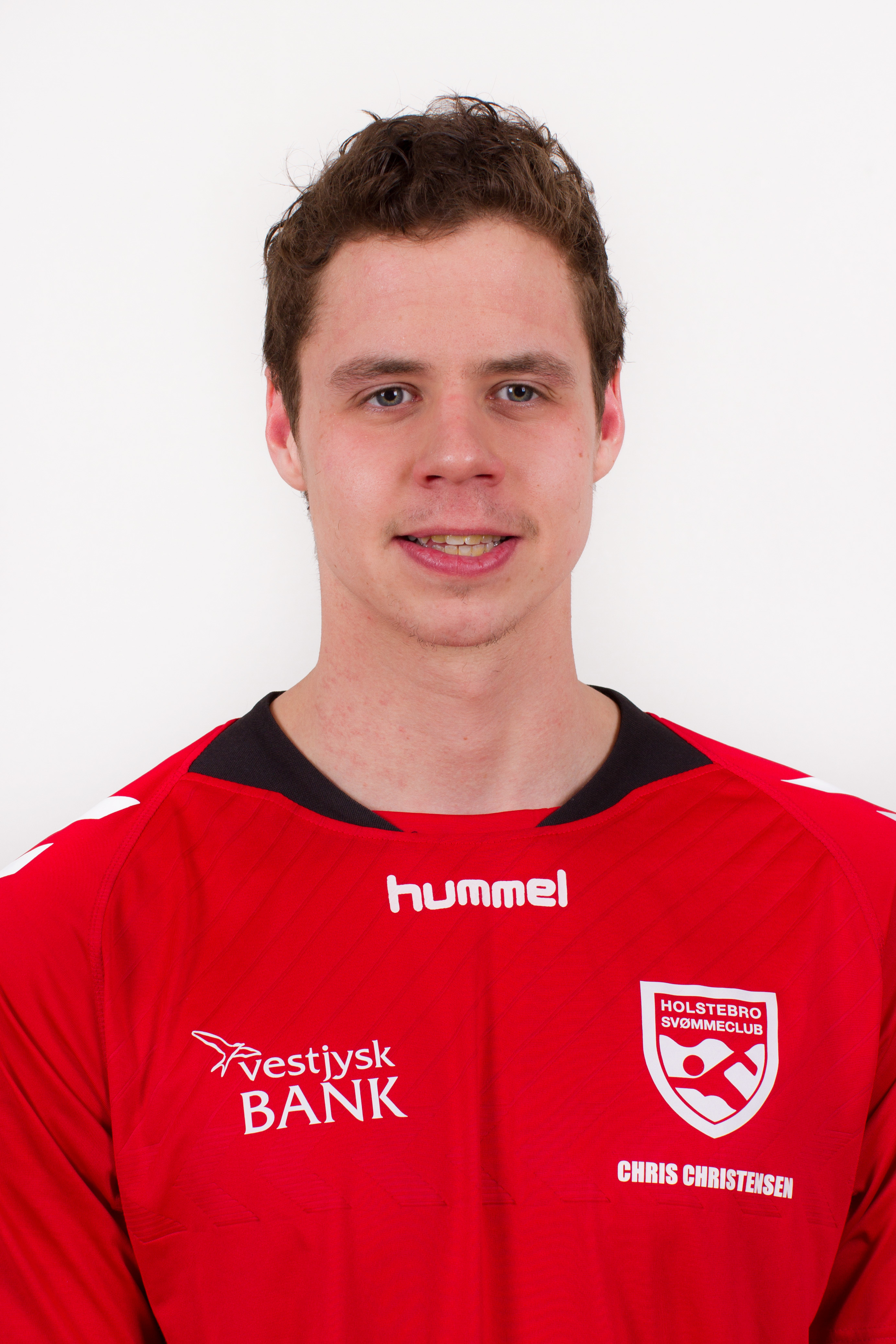
- Chris Christensen in 2013

Personal information
- Full name: Chris Boe Christensen
- Nationality: Denmark
- Born: 2 March 1988 (age 38)
- Height: 1.89 m (6 ft 2 in)
- Weight: 82 kg (181 lb)

Sport
- Sport: Swimming
- Strokes: Breaststroke, medley
- Club: West-Swim Esbjerg

Chris Christensen (born 2 March 1988) is a Danish swimmer. He competed at the 2008 Summer Olympics in the 200 m medley and 200 m breaststroke events and finished in 32nd and 33rd place, respectively.
