= Tomáš Fučík =

Czech swimmer

Personal information
- Full name: Tomáš Fučík
- National team: Czech Republic
- Born: 23 May 1985 (age 41) Třebíč, Czechoslovakia
- Height: 1.85 m (6 ft 1 in)
- Weight: 78 kg (172 lb)

Sport
- Sport: Swimming
- Strokes: Backstroke, medley
- Club: Jihlavsky PK
- Coach: Markéta Kaplanova

Tomáš Fučík (born 23 May 1985) is a Czech former swimmer, who specialized in backstroke and individual medley events. He represented his nation Czech Republic at the 2008 Summer Olympics, and has owned multiple Czech championship titles and national records in both the 100 m backstroke and 200 m individual medley. Fucik was also member of the Jihlavsky Swimming Club (Czech: Jihlavský klub plavání), under the tutelage of his personal coach Markéta Kaplanova.

Fucik competed for the Czech Republic in two swimming events at the 2008 Summer Olympics in Beijing. Leading up to the Games, he scored the scintillating marks of 56.54 (100 m backstroke) and 2:03.57 (200 m individual medley), respectively, to remarkably slide each under the FINA B-cut at the Mare Nostrum Barcelona Meet in Spain. In the 100 m backstroke, Fucik could not replicate his pre-Olympic feat with a 57.29 to round out the second heat in last place and forty-first overall from the prelims. Three days later, in the 200 m individual medley, Fucik stormed home on the rear of the breaststroke leg to take the fourth spot in a lifetime best of 2:02.85, but missed out the semifinals with a thirty-first overall placement.
