= Brenton Cabello =

Spanish swimmer (born 1981)

Personal information
- Full name: Brenton Cabello Forns
- Nationality: Spanish
- Born: 26 September 1981 (age 44) Barcelona, Spain

Sport
- Sport: Swimming
Medal record
Representing Spain
Mediterranean Games
Bronze medal – third place	2005 Almeria	200m individual medley

Brenton Cabello Forns (Note: In this Spanish name, the first or paternal surname is Cabello and the second or maternal family name is Forns.) (born 26 September 1981 in Barcelona, Spain) is a Spanish medley swimmer who competed in the 2008 Summer Olympics.
