= Hidemasa Sano =

Japanese swimmer

Personal information
- Nationality: Japan
- Born: May 28, 1984 (age 42) Toyama, Japan

Sport
- Sport: Swimming
- Strokes: Medley
Medal record
Men's swimming
Representing Japan
Summer Universiade
Bronze medal – third place	2011 Shenzhen	200 m butterfly
Asian Games
Gold medal – first place	2006 Doha	200m individual medley
Gold medal – first place	2006 Doha	400m individual medley

Hidemasa Sano (佐野 秀匡, Sano Hidemasa; born May 28, 1984 in Toyama) is a Japanese medley swimmer.

== Major achievements ==
2006 Pan Pacific Swimming Championships

- 200m individual medley 5th (2:01.50)
- 400m individual medley 7th (4:22.41)

2007 World Aquatics Championships

- 200m individual medley 9th (2:00.57)
- 400m individual medley 15th (4:22.68)

== Personal bests ==
In long course

- 200m individual medley: 1:59.84 (August 2, 2008)
- 400m individual medley: 4:16.18 (December 2, 2006)

In short course

- 200m individual medley: 1:54.92 Asian, Japanese Record (February 22, 2009)
- 400m individual medley: 4:05.15 Japanese Record (February 21, 2009)
