= Vadym Lepskyy =

Ukrainian swimmer (born 1985)

Personal information
- Full name: Vadym Lepskyy
- National team: Ukraine
- Born: 9 July 1985 (age 41) Kremenchuk, Ukrainian SSR, Soviet Union
- Height: 1.76 m (5 ft 9 in)
- Weight: 65 kg (143 lb)

Sport
- Sport: Swimming
- Strokes: Individual medley
- Club: ZS Kiev

Vadym Lepskyy (Ukrainian: Вадим Лепський. Born July 9, 1985) is a Ukrainian swimmer, who specialized in individual medley events. He represented Ukraine at the 2008 Summer Olympics, and has won numerous medals in both the 200 and 400 m individual medley at the Ukrainian national championships.

Lepskyy competed for the Ukrainian team in a medley double at the 2008 Summer Olympics in Beijing. Leading up to the Games, he cleared FINA B-standard entry times of 2:02.94 (200 m individual medley) and 4:21.16 (400 m individual medley) at the Multinations Swim Meet in Prague, Czech Republic. On the first day of the Games, Lepskyy cruised to sixth place in the final heat and twentieth overall by thirteen seconds behind U.S. swimmer and all-time Olympian Michael Phelps (4:07.82) in 4:20.96. In the 200 m individual medley, Lepskyy challenged seven other swimmers in the second heat, including two-time Olympian and California Bears swimmer Miguel Molina of the Philippines. He raced to third place by 0.12 of a second behind Molina with a time of 2:01.73. Lepskyy failed to advance into the semifinals, as he placed twenty-eighth overall in the preliminaries.
