= Vasileios Demetis =

Greek swimmer

Personal information
- Nationality: Greece
- Born: May 12, 1983 (age 43) Athens, Greece
- Height: 1.81 m (5 ft 11 in)

Sport
- Sport: Swimming
- Club: TG Biberach

Vasileios Demetis (Greek: Βασίλειος Δεμέτης, born May 12, 1983, in Athens, Greece) is an Olympic swimmer from Greece.

== Career ==
Demetis swam for Greece at the 2008 Olympics and at the 2007 World Championships.
