= Carlos Almeida (swimmer) =

Portuguese swimmer

Personal information
- Full name: Carlos Fernandes Esteves de Almeida
- National team: Portugal
- Born: 4 August 1988 (age 38) Lisbon, Portugal
- Height: 1.82 m (6 ft 0 in)
- Weight: 87 kg (192 lb)

Sport
- Sport: Swimming
- Strokes: Breaststroke
- Club: Clube de Natação da Amadora
- College team: University of Louisville (U.S.)
- Coach: Filipe Coelho (Amadora); Arthur Albiero (Louisville)

Carlos Fernandes Esteves de Almeida (also Carlos Almeida, born 4 August 1988) is a Portuguese swimmer, who specializes in breaststroke events. He is a two-time Olympian, an NCAA Champion, a 2011 Big East Conference champion, and a current Portuguese record holder in the 50, 100 and 200 m breaststroke in the long and short course. Almeida is a resident athlete for Amadora Swimming Club in Lisbon (Portuguese: Clube de Natação da Amadora), and is coached and trained by Filipe Coelho.

Almeida made his official debut at the 2008 Summer Olympics in Beijing, where he competed in the men's 200 m breaststroke. He cleared a FINA B-cut of 2:15.00 from the Dutch Open in Eindhoven, Netherlands. Almeida blasted a 2:15 barrier and a new Portuguese record of 2:13.34 to top the second heat, but he finished only in thirty-second overall from the preliminaries.

== 2012 London Olympics ==
At the 2012 Summer Olympics in London, Almeida qualified for the men's 100 m breaststroke by establishing a Portuguese record and achieving a FINA B-standard entry time of 1:01.19 from the European Championships in Debrecen, Hungary. He challenged seven other swimmers on the third heat, including fellow two-time Olympian Martin Liivamägi of Estonia. He raced to third place by two tenths of a second (0.20) behind Greece's Panagiotis Samilidis in 1:01.40. Almeida failed to advance into the semifinals, as he placed twenty-fifth overall out of 44 swimmers on the first day of preliminaries.

== University of Louisville ==
Almeida swam for the University of Louisville under Head Coach Arthur Albiero. He was a sports administration major at the Louisville. He became the first swimmer in school's history to claim a title at the NCAA Division I Championships in Federal Way, Washington. He blasted a time of 1:51.88 in the 200 breast stroke to match former Olympic silver medalist Ed Moses for the fourth-fastest all time in collegiate history.
