= Tamás Kerékjártó =

Hungarian swimmer

Personal information
- Full name: Tamás Kerékjártó
- Nickname: Karika
- Nationality: Hungary
- Born: 9 July 1979 (age 47) Miskolc, Hungary
- Height: 1.85 m (6 ft 1 in)

Sport
- Sport: Swimming
- Strokes: Butterfly and Medley
- Club: Székesfehérvári Delfin SE
Medal record
European Championships (LC)
Bronze medal – third place	2006 Budapest	200 m medley
European Championships (SC)
Silver medal – second place	2002 Riesa	200 m medley
Bronze medal – third place	2006 Helsinki	200 m medley

Tamás Kerékjártó (born 9 July 1979 in Miskolc) is a Hungarian swimmer. He represented his home country at the 1996, 2004 and 2008 Olympic Games.
