= Gard Kvale =

Norwegian swimmer (born 1984)

Personal information
- Nationality: Norway
- Born: May 6, 1984 (age 42) Bergen, Norway
- Height: 1.83 m (6 ft 0 in)

Sport
- Sport: Swimming
- Strokes: Freestyle, IM
- Club: Bergens Svømme Club

Gard Kvale (born 6 May 1984 in Bergen, Norway) is an Olympic and National Record holding swimmer from Norway. He swam for Norway at the 2008 Olympics, where he lowered the Norwegian Records in the 3 events he swam: the 200 and 400 frees and the 200 IM.

As of 2008, he attends Bergen University College (Norwegian: Høgskolen i Bergen (HiB)).

At the 2007 Norwegian Championships in Namos, Norway, he won 7 events: the 100, 200, 800 and 1500 frees, the 200 and 400 IMs, and the 200 fly.

On July 1, 2009, he and Alexander Dale Oen were the 2 males named to Norway's 6-swimmer team for the 2009 World Championships.

== See also ==
(in Norwegian) no:Gard Kvale — Norsk Wikipedia entry
