= Dmitriy Gordiyenko =

Kazakhstani swimmer (born 1986)

Personal information
- National team: Kazakhstan
- Born: 20 May 1986 (age 40) Karaganda Region, Kazakh SSR, Soviet Union
- Height: 1.80 m (5 ft 11 in)
- Weight: 75 kg (165 lb)

Sport
- Sport: Swimming
- Strokes: Individual medley
Medal record
Men's swimming
Representing Kazakhstan
Asian Indoor Games
Gold medal – first place	2005 Bangkok	200 m medley
Gold medal – first place	2009 Hanoi	100 m medley
Gold medal – first place	2009 Hanoi	200 m medley
Silver medal – second place	2007 Macau	200 m medley

Dmitriy Gordiyenko (Kazakh: Дмитрий Геннадьевич Гордиенко; born May 20, 1986) is a Kazakh swimmer, who specialized in individual medley events. He represented his nation Kazakhstan at the 2008 Summer Olympics, and has won a career total of four medals (three golds and one silver) in a major international competition, spanning three editions of the Asian Indoor Games (2005, 2007, and 2009).

Gordiyenko competed for the Kazakh squad in a medley double at the 2008 Summer Olympics in Beijing with five days apart from each other. Leading up to the Games, he scored a time of 2:01.49 (200 m individual medley) and 4:27.15 (400 m individual medley), respectively, to take the medley crowns and clear the FINA B-cut each at the Kazakhstan Open Championships in Almaty. In the 400 m individual medley, Gordiyenko rallied from fourth towards the freestyle leg in the opening heat to fight off against three fastest swimmers in a sprint challenge, but could not catch the hard-charging Croatian Nikša Roki to finish only with a second-place time and twenty-sixth overall in 4:25.20. Four nights later, in the 200 m individual medley, Gordiyenko touched out Germany's Markus Deibler on the final stretch by nearly half of his body length to save the seventh spot in 2:03.92, but fell short for the semifinals with a thirty-seventh overall placement from the prelims.
