= Nikša Roki =

Croatian swimmer (born 1988)

Niksa Roki
Personal information
- Full name: Niksa Roki
- National team: Croatia
- Born: 8 February 1988 (age 38) Zagreb, SR Croatia, SFR Yugoslavia
- Height: 1.88 m (6 ft 2 in)
- Weight: 80 kg (176 lb)

Sport
- Sport: Swimming
- Strokes: Butterfly, medley
- Club: Zagrebački PK
- College team: Ohio State University (U.S.)

Nikša Roki (born 8 February 1988) is a Croatian swimmer, who specialized in butterfly and individual medley events. He represented his nation Croatia at the 2008 Summer Olympics, and has claimed multiple-time Croatian championship titles and national records throughout his swimming career in the 200 m butterfly and the individual medley double (both 200 and 400 m).

Roki competed for Croatia in two swimming events at the 2008 Summer Olympics in Beijing. Leading up to the Games, he managed to dip beneath the FINA B-cut in 2:01.56 (200 m butterfly) and 4:25.28 (400 m individual medley) at the Golden Bear meet in Zagreb. On the first day of the Games, Roki broke a Croatian record of 4:22.44 to touch the wall first in heat one of the 400 m individual medley, but finished only in twenty-third place. In the 200 m butterfly, Roki repeated his luck in the evening prelims, as he topped the first heat against India's Rehan Poncha, Peru's Emmanuel Crescimbeni, and Honduras' Javier Hernández Maradiaga, overhauling a sub-2:00 barrier with a new Croatian record on a tech body suit in 1:59.58, nearly two seconds faster than his entry time. Roki failed to advance into the semifinals, as he placed thirty-first overall in the prelims.

Roki is previously a member of the swimming team for the Ohio State Buckeyes, and a graduate of biology at the Ohio State University in Columbus, Ohio (2011). He was also named an honorable mention Scholar All-American by the National Swimming Coaches Association of America in 2009.

Roki was previously a graduate student at the University of Maryland, College Park and was a teaching assistant for freshman level bioengineering courses there. He is now a Postdoctoral Associate for the University of Miami School of Medicine.
