= Andrey Krylov (swimmer born 1984) =

Russian swimmer

Personal information
- Born: 10 April 1984 (age 41) Moscow, Russia
- Height: 1.80 m (5 ft 11 in)
- Weight: 73 kg (161 lb)

Sport
- Sport: Swimming
- Club: CSKA

Andrey Viktorovich Krylov (Russian: Андрей Викторович Крылов; born 10 April 1984) is a Russian swimmer. He competed in the individual 400 m medley event at the 2008 Summer Olympics and set a national record, but did not reach the finals.
