= Iurii Zakharov =

Kyrgyzstani swimmer (born 1985)

Iurii Zakharov Andreyvich
Personal information
- Full name: Iurii Zakharov
- National team: Kyrgyzstan
- Born: 1 December 1985 (age 40) Andijon, Uzbek SSR, Soviet Union
- Height: 1.85 m (6 ft 1 in)
- Weight: 69 kg (152 lb)

Sport
- Sport: Swimming
- Strokes: Backstroke, medley

Iurii Zakharov (also Yuriy Zaharov, Russian: Юрий Захаров; born December 1, 1985) is a Kyrgyzstani former swimmer, who specialized in backstroke and individual medley events. He represented his Kyrgyzstan in two editions of the Olympic Games (2004 and 2008).

Zakharov made his first Kyrgyz team, as a 19-year-old, at the 2004 Summer Olympics in Athens, where he competed in the men's 200 m backstroke. Swimming in heat one, he recorded the slowest prelims time of the event in 2:10.45 to close out the field of thirty-six swimmers to last place.

At the 2008 Summer Olympics in Beijing, Zakharov qualified this time for the men's 200 m individual medley, by clearing a FINA B-cut of 2:05.43 from the Russian Swimming Championships in Moscow. He challenged six other swimmers on the first heat, including fellow two-time Olympians Omar Pinzón of Colombia, Andrejs Dūda of Latvia, and Danil Bugakov of Uzbekistan. Zakharov edged out Bugakov to take a sixth spot by three seconds in 2:07.01. Zakharov failed to advance into the semifinals, as he placed forty-fifth overall in the preliminary heats.
