= Ioannis Kokkodis =

Greek swimmer (born 1981)

Personal information
- Born: 8 January 1981 (age 45) Athens, Greece
- Height: 1.92 m (6 ft 4 in)
- Weight: 83 kg (183 lb)

Sport
- Sport: Swimming
- Club: AOPF, Palaion Faliro
Medal record
Men's swimming
Representing Greece
European Championships
Bronze medal – third place	2002 Berlin	4×200 m freestyle

Ioannis Kokkodis (Greek: Ιωάννης Κοκκώδης; born 8 January 1981) is a retired Greek swimmer who won a bronze medal in the 4 × 200 m freestyle relay at the 2002 European Aquatics Championships. He also competed in the 2000, 2004 and 2008 Summer Olympics with the best achievement of sixth place in the 400 m medley in 2004, in his native city of Athens. This was the first Olympics in more than 100 years where Greek swimmers reached the finals.
