= Saša Imprić =

Croatian swimmer

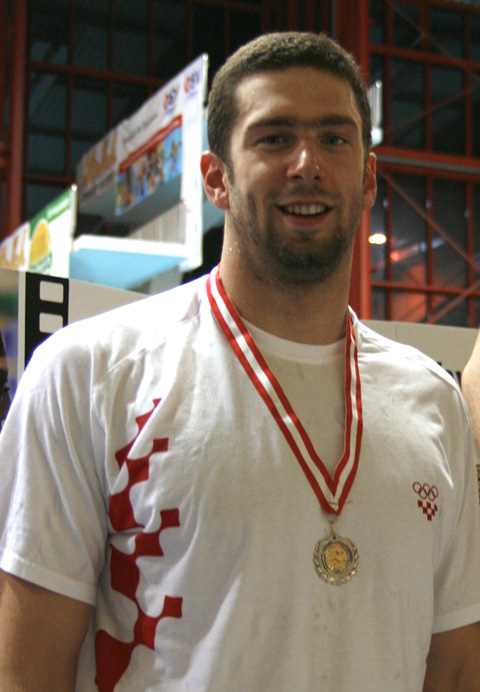

Medal record

Men's swimming

Representing Croatia

European Championships (SC)
Silver medal – second place	2007 Debrecen	200 m Individual Medley

European Junior Championships
Gold medal – first place	2004 Lisbon	200 m Individual Medley

Saša Imprić (born January 9, 1986, in Zagreb) is a medley swimmer and from Croatia, who made his Olympic debut for his native country at the 2004 Summer Olympics in Athens, Greece. There he was eliminated in the qualifying heats of the 400 m Individual Medley, placing 32nd.

== Sources ==
- "Saša Imprić". hoo.hr. Croatian Olympic Committee. 10 November 2016.
