= Dean Kent (swimmer) =

New Zealand swimmer (born 1978)

Personal information
- Full name: Dean Matthew Kent
- Nationality: New Zealand
- Born: 6 November 1978 (age 47) Palmerston North, New Zealand

Sport
- Sport: Swimming
- Strokes: IM
Medal record
Commonwealth Games
Silver medal – second place	2006 Melbourne	200m Individual Medley

Dean Matthew Kent (born 6 November 1978 in Palmerston North, New Zealand) is a 3-time Olympic swimmer from New Zealand. He represented New Zealand at the 2000, 2004, and 2008 Olympics.

At the 2004 Olympics, he set the New Zealand Records in the 200 and 400 IMs. As of June 2010, he still holds both these records; with times swum at the 2006 Commonwealth Games (400 IM—4:18.20) and the 2007 World Championships (200 IM—2:00.30).

Kent now works as Head of Swimming at Northern Arena Learn to Swim and Fitness Facility, Silverdale Auckland New Zealand.

Kent's younger brother Steven represented New Zealand in swimming at the 2012 Summer Olympics.

== Personal best time ==
- 200 I.M. (LCM): 2:00.30
- 400 I.M. (LCM): 4:18.55
