= Vasilii Danilov =

Kyrgyzstani swimmer (born 1988)

Personal information
- Full name: Василий Данилов
- Nationality: Kyrgyzstan
- Born: 13 December 1988 (age 37)
- Height: 1.90 m (6 ft 3 in)

Sport
- Sport: Swimming
- Strokes: IM

Vasilii Danilov (born 13 December 1988) is an Olympic swimmer freestyle and medley from Kyrgyzstan. He swam for the country at the 2004 and 2008 Olympics.

He also swam at the 2007 World Championships.
