= Alessio Boggiatto =

Italian swimmer (born 1981)

Personal information
- Full name: Alessio Boggiatto
- Nationality: Italy
- Born: 18 December 1981 (age 44) Moncalieri, Turin
- Height: 1.93 m (6 ft 4 in)

Sport
- Sport: Swimming
- Strokes: Medley
- Club: Sisport Fiat Torino
Medal record
Event	1st	2nd	3rd
World Championships (LC)	1	0	0
European Championships (LC)	1	2	2
European Championships (SC)	3	0	3
Mediterranean Games	0	1	1
Total	5	3	6
World Aquatics Championships
Gold medal – first place	2001 Fukuoka	400 m indiv. medley
European Aquatics Championships (LC)
Gold medal – first place	2002 Berlin	400 m indiv. medley
Silver medal – second place	2002 Berlin	200 m indiv. medley
Silver medal – second place	2006 Budapest	200 m indiv. medley
Bronze medal – third place	2004 Madrid	400 m indiv. medley
Bronze medal – third place	2006 Budapest	400 m indiv. medley
European Aquatics Championships (SC)
Gold medal – first place	2000 Valencia	400 m indiv. medley
Gold medal – first place	2001 Antwerp	400 m indiv. medley
Gold medal – first place	2002 Riesa	400 m indiv. medley
Bronze medal – third place	2001 Antwerp	200 m indiv. medley
Bronze medal – third place	2005 Trieste	400 m indiv. medley
Bronze medal – third place	2005 Trieste	200 m indiv. medley
Mediterranean Games
Silver medal – second place	2005 Almería	200 m indiv. medley

Alessio Boggiatto (born 18 December 1981) is a former Italian medley swimmer.

== Biography ==
Born at Moncalieri, Boggiatto specialized in 400 m medley, winning several European Championship medals and one World Championship title in that distance. He participated for Italy in the Summer Olympic of Sydney 2000, Athens 2004 and Beijing 2008 achieving the 4th place three times in a row.

He is a sibling of Chiara Boggiatto, also a swimmer.

== See also ==
- Italian swimmers multiple medalists at the international competitions
