= Swimming at the 2014 European Aquatics Championships – Men's 200 metre individual medley =

Men's 200 metre individual medley at the Swimming at the 2014 European Aquatics Championships
- Dates: 19–20 August
- Competitors: 36 from 24 nations
- Winning time: 1:58.10

Medalists
| gold medal | László Cseh | Hungary |
| silver medal | Philip Heintz | Germany |
| bronze medal | Roberto Pavoni | Great Britain |

The Men's 200 metre individual medley competition of the 2014 European Aquatics Championships was held on 19–20 August.

== Records ==
Prior to the competition, the existing world, European and championship records were as follows.

| | Name | Nation | Time | Location | Date |
|---|---|---|---|---|---|
| World record | Ryan Lochte | United States | 1:54.00 | Shanghai | 24 July 2011 |
| European record | László Cseh | Hungary | 1:55.18 | Rome | 29 July 2009 |
| Championship record | László Cseh | Hungary | 1:56.66 | Debrecen | 23 May 2012 |

== Results ==
=== Heats ===
The heats were held at 10:07.

| Rank | Heat | Lane | Name | Nationality | Time | Notes |
|---|---|---|---|---|---|---|
| 1 | 4 | 4 | László Cseh | Hungary | 1:59.17 | Q |
| 2 | 3 | 4 | Markus Deibler | Germany | 1:59.60 | Q |
| 3 | 3 | 5 | Roberto Pavoni | Great Britain | 1:59.89 | Q |
| 4 | 4 | 5 | Eduardo Solaeche | Spain | 2:00.16 | Q |
| 5 | 4 | 3 | Philip Heintz | Germany | 2:00.18 | Q |
| 6 | 2 | 6 | Yakov Toumarkin | Israel | 2:00.32 | Q |
| 7 | 4 | 2 | Alexis Santos | Portugal | 2:00.54 | Q |
| 8 | 4 | 6 | Gal Nevo | Israel | 2:00.83 | Q |
| 9 | 2 | 4 | Simon Sjödin | Sweden | 2:01.08 | Q |
| 10 | 2 | 7 | Andreas Vazaios | Greece | 2:01.17 | Q |
| 11 | 2 | 3 | Dávid Verrasztó | Hungary | 2:01.23 | Q |
| 12 | 2 | 5 | Diogo Carvalho | Portugal | 2:01.34 | Q |
| 13 | 3 | 6 | Federico Turrini | Italy | 2:01.61 | Q |
| 13 | 3 | 2 | Albert Puig | Spain | 2:01.61 | Q |
| 15 | 3 | 1 | Marcin Cieślak | Poland | 2:01.86 | Q |
| 16 | 4 | 7 | Alexander Tikhonov | Russia | 2:01.88 | Q |
| 17 | 3 | 7 | Damiano Lestingi | Italy | 2:01.97 | |
| 18 | 3 | 8 | Jakub Maly | Austria | 2:02.19 | |
| 19 | 4 | 0 | Jeremy Desplanches | Switzerland | 2:02.53 | |
| 20 | 1 | 7 | Martin Liivamägi | Estonia | 2:02.61 | |
| 21 | 4 | 8 | Daniel Skaaning | Denmark | 2:02.74 | |
| 22 | 3 | 3 | Ivan Trofimov | Russia | 2:02.96 | |
| 23 | 2 | 0 | Pavel Janeček | Czech Republic | 2:03.29 | |
| 24 | 2 | 1 | Raphaël Stacchiotti | Luxembourg | 2:03.47 | |
| 25 | 1 | 4 | Ensar Hajder | Bosnia and Herzegovina | 2:03.68 | |
| 26 | 2 | 2 | Dmitry Gorbunov | Russia | 2:03.75 | |
| 27 | 1 | 2 | Christoph Meier | Liechtenstein | 2:03.85 | |
| 28 | 2 | 9 | Bogdan Knežević | Serbia | 2:04.43 | |
| 29 | 1 | 3 | Etay Gurevich | Israel | 2:04.74 | |
| 30 | 1 | 5 | Alpkan Örnek | Turkey | 2:04.97 | |
| 31 | 3 | 0 | Theo Fuchs | France | 2:05.24 | |
| 32 | 4 | 9 | Eric Ress | France | 2:05.72 | |
| 33 | 2 | 8 | Igor Kozlovskij | Lithuania | 2:06.07 | |
| 34 | 3 | 9 | Irakli Bolkvadze | Georgia | 2:06.24 | |
| 35 | 1 | 6 | Heiko Gigler | Austria | 2:08.21 | |
| — | 4 | 1 | Matteo Pelizzari | Italy | | DSQ |

=== Semifinals ===
The semifinals were held at 18:46.

==== Semifinal 1 ====
| Rank | Lane | Name | Nationality | Time | Notes |
|---|---|---|---|---|---|
| 1 | 4 | Markus Deibler | Germany | 1:59.43 | Q |
| 2 | 5 | Eduardo Solaeche | Spain | 1:59.64 | Q |
| 3 | 1 | Federico Turrini | Italy | 1:59.80 | Q |
| 4 | 2 | Andreas Vazaios | Greece | 2:00.45 | |
| 5 | 3 | Yakov Toumarkin | Israel | 2:00.90 | |
| 6 | 6 | Gal Nevo | Israel | 2:01.03 | |
| 7 | 8 | Alexander Tikhonov | Russia | 2:01.23 | |
| 8 | 7 | Diogo Carvalho | Portugal | 2:01.52 | |

==== Semifinal 2 ====
| Rank | Lane | Name | Nationality | Time | Notes |
|---|---|---|---|---|---|
| 1 | 4 | László Cseh | Hungary | 1:58.00 | Q |
| 2 | 3 | Philip Heintz | Germany | 1:58.17 | Q |
| 3 | 5 | Roberto Pavoni | Great Britain | 1:59.54 | Q |
| 4 | 6 | Alexis Santos | Portugal | 2:00.12 | Q |
| 5 | 8 | Marcin Cieślak | Poland | 2:00.32 | Q |
| 6 | 7 | Dávid Verrasztó | Hungary | 2:00.43 | |
| 7 | 1 | Albert Puig | Spain | 2:01.13 | |
| 8 | 2 | Simon Sjödin | Sweden | 2:02.83 | |

=== Final ===
The final was held at 19:22.

| Rank | Lane | Name | Nationality | Time | Notes |
|---|---|---|---|---|---|
| 1st place, gold medalist(s) | 4 | László Cseh | Hungary | 1:58.10 | |
| 2nd place, silver medalist(s) | 5 | Philip Heintz | Germany | 1:58.17 | |
| 3rd place, bronze medalist(s) | 6 | Roberto Pavoni | Great Britain | 1:58.22 | |
| 4 | 3 | Markus Deibler | Germany | 1:58.29 | |
| 5 | 2 | Eduardo Solaeche | Spain | 1:59.11 | |
| 6 | 7 | Federico Turrini | Italy | 2:00.44 | |
| 7 | 8 | Marcin Cieślak | Poland | 2:00.65 | |
| 8 | 1 | Alexis Santos | Portugal | 2:01.41 | |
