= Swimming at the 2016 European Aquatics Championships – Men's 200 metre individual medley =

Men's 200 metre individual medley at the 2016 European Aquatics Championships
- Dates: 17 May
- Competitors: 44 from 27 nations
- Winning time: 1:58.18

Medalists
gold medal	Andreas Vazaios	Greece
silver medal	Gal Nevo	Israel
bronze medal	Alexis Santos	Portugal

The Men's 200 metre individual medley competition of the 2016 European Aquatics Championships was held on 17 May 2016.

== Records ==
Prior to the competition, the existing world, European and championship records were as follows.

	Name	Nation	Time	Location	Date
World record	Ryan Lochte	United States	1:54.00	Shanghai	24 July 2011
European record	László Cseh	Hungary	1:55.18	Rome	29 July 2009
Championship record	László Cseh	Hungary	1:56.66	Debrecen	23 May 2012

== Results ==
=== Heats ===
The heats were held on 17 May at 10:39.

Rank	Heat	Lane	Name	Nationality	Time	Notes
1	3	4	László Cseh	Hungary	1:58.17	
2	4	2	Alexis Santos	Portugal	1:59.90	Q
3	3	5	Andreas Vazaios	Greece	2:00.00	Q
4	3	2	Gal Nevo	Israel	2:00.24	Q
5	5	7	Raphaël Stacchiotti	Luxembourg	2:00.66	Q
6	3	3	Diogo Carvalho	Portugal	2:00.68	Q
7	5	6	Federico Turrini	Italy	2:00.85	Q
8	2	3	Phillipp Forster	Germany	2:00.89	Q
9	3	6	Max Litchfield	Great Britain	2:01.13	Q
10	5	4	Daniel Wallace	Great Britain	2:01.28	Q
11	4	7	Alexander Osipenko	Russia	2:01.49	Q
11	5	5	Eduardo Solaeche	Spain	2:01.49	Q
13	3	0	Benjámin Grátz	Hungary	2:01.51	Q
14	3	8	Pavel Janeček	Czech Republic	2:01.72	Q, NR
14	4	3	Ieuan Lloyd	Great Britain	2:01.72	
16	2	9	Petter Fredriksson	Sweden	2:01.84	Q
17	4	8	Jakub Maly	Austria	2:01.97	Q
18	2	6	Alpkan Örnek	Turkey	2:01.99	Q
19	4	4	Marcin Tarczyński	Poland	2:02.09	
20	3	7	Ganesh Pedurand	France	2:02.12	
20	5	0	Gabriel Lopes	Portugal	2:02.12	
22	5	2	Semen Makovich	Russia	2:02.20	
23	5	3	Jérémy Desplanches	Switzerland	2:02.43	
24	3	1	Etay Gurevich	Israel	2:02.51	
25	4	1	Sebastian Steffan	Austria	2:02.89	
26	4	9	Heiko Gigler	Austria	2:02.92	
27	5	1	Kevin Wedel	Germany	2:03.00	
28	2	2	Marcin Tarczyński	Poland	2:03.06	
29	2	5	Viktor Bromer	Denmark	2:03.07	
30	5	8	Andrey Zhilkin	Russia	2:03.32	
31	4	0	Martin Liivamägi	Estonia	2:03.37	
32	2	1	Marko Blaževski	Macedonia	2:03.66	
33	2	7	Christoph Meier	Liechtenstein	2:03.95	
34	3	9	Sindri Jakobsson	Norway	2:04.07	
35	5	9	Povilas Strazdas	Lithuania	2:04.11	
36	2	8	Tomas Veloso	Portugal	2:05.74	
37	1	5	Nikola Dimitrov	Bulgaria	2:05.95	
38	2	0	Pavol Jelenák	Slovakia	2:06.03	
39	2	4	Ergecan Gezmiş	Turkey	2:06.18	
40	1	3	Irakli Bolkvadze	Georgia	2:06.55	
41	1	4	Luca Pfyffer	Switzerland	2:06.69	
42	1	7	Osvald Nitski	Estonia	2:06.71	
43	1	2	Silver Hein	Estonia	2:08.64	
44	1	6	Alvi Hjelm	Faroe Islands	2:10.32	
	4	5	Yakov Toumarkin	Israel	DNS	
	4	6	Duncan Scott	Great Britain	DNS	

=== Semifinals ===
The semifinals were held on 17 May at 18:50.

==== Semifinal 1 ====
Rank	Lane	Name	Nationality	Time	Notes
1	4	Andreas Vazaios	Greece	1:58.47	Q
2	3	Federico Turrini	Italy	2:00.57	Q
3	5	Raphaël Stacchiotti	Luxembourg	2:00.72	Q
4	6	Max Litchfield	Great Britain	2:00.86	Q
5	7	Benjámin Grátz	Hungary	2:00.90	
6	2	Eduardo Solaeche	Spain	2:01.74	
7	1	Petter Fredriksson	Sweden	2:02.37	
8	8	Alpkan Örnek	Turkey	2:02.74	

==== Semifinal 2 ====
Rank	Lane	Name	Nationality	Time	Notes
1	4	Alexis Santos	Portugal	1:59.93	Q
2	3	Diogo Carvalho	Portugal	2:00.07	Q
3	5	Gal Nevo	Israel	2:00.32	Q
4	2	Daniel Wallace	Great Britain	2:00.74	Q
5	7	Alexander Osipenko	Russia	2:01.13	
6	6	Phillipp Forster	Germany	2:01.17	
7	1	Pavel Janeček	Czech Republic	2:02.37	
8	8	Jakub Maly	Austria	2:02.55	

=== Final ===
The final was held on 18 May at 19:26.

Rank	Lane	Name	Nationality	Time	Notes
1st place, gold medalist(s)	4	Andreas Vazaios	Greece	1:58.18	
2nd place, silver medalist(s)	6	Gal Nevo	Israel	1:59.69	
3rd place, bronze medalist(s)	5	Alexis Santos	Portugal	1:59.76	
4	2	Federico Turrini	Italy	2:00.28	
5	3	Diogo Carvalho	Portugal	2:00.29	
6	7	Raphaël Stacchiotti	Luxembourg	2:00.56	
7	8	Max Litchfield	Great Britain	2:00.71	
8	1	Daniel Wallace	Great Britain	2:00.92	
