= 2014 FINA World Swimming Championships (25 m) – Men's 200 metre individual medley =

Men 200 metre individual medley at the 2014 FINA World Swimming Championships (25 m)
- Dates: 5 December
- Competitors: 52 from 40 nations
- Winning time: 1:50.47

Medalists
gold medal	Kosuke Hagino	Japan
silver medal	Ryan Lochte	United States
bronze medal	Daiya Seto	Japan

The Men's 200 metre individual medley competition of the 2014 FINA World Swimming Championships (25 m) was held on 5 December.

== Records ==
Prior to the competition, the existing world and championship records were as follows.

	Name	Nation	Time	Location	Date
World record Championship record	Ryan Lochte	United States	1:49.63	Istanbul	14 December 2012

== Results ==
=== Heats ===
The heats were held at 12:04.

Rank	Heat	Lane	Name	Nationality	Time	Notes
1	6	3	Ryan Lochte	United States	1:52.92	Q
2	6	4	Kosuke Hagino	Japan	1:53.11	Q
3	5	4	Daiya Seto	Japan	1:53.15	Q
4	6	2	Henrique Rodrigues	Brazil	1:53.49	Q
5	5	5	Diogo Carvalho	Portugal	1:53.70	Q
6	5	9	Marcin Cieślak	Poland	1:54.15	Q
7	4	4	Philip Heintz	Germany	1:54.31	Q
8	4	9	Yakov Toumarkin	Israel	1:54.99	Q
9	4	6	Gal Nevo	Israel	1:55.37	
10	5	3	Dávid Verrasztó	Hungary	1:55.55	
11	6	6	Tyler Clary	United States	1:55.63	
12	6	5	Viktor Bromer	Denmark	1:55.92	
13	5	7	Alexander Tikhonov	Russia	1:55.98	
14	5	8	Andreas Vazaios	Greece	1:56.01	
15	4	2	Raphaël Stacchiotti	Luxembourg	1:56.11	
16	6	1	Jérémy Desplanches	Switzerland	1:56.31	
17	4	5	Semen Makovich	Russia	1:56.33	
18	5	1	Aleksey Derlyugov	Uzbekistan	1:56.53	
19	6	7	Jakub Maly	Austria	1:56.92	
20	5	2	Daniel Skaaning	Denmark	1:57.07	
21	6	8	Benjámin Grátz	Hungary	1:58.18	
22	4	1	Fu Haifeng	China	1:58.72	
23	3	2	Marko Blaževski	Macedonia	1:58.99	
23	4	0	Matteo Pelizzari	Italy	1:58.99	
25	5	0	Alpkan Örnek	Turkey	1:59.27	
26	6	0	Taki Mrabet	Tunisia	1:59.29	
27	6	9	Wei Haobo	China	1:59.81	
28	4	8	Sebastian Steffan	Austria	1:59.93	
29	3	5	Lies Nefsi	Algeria	2:02.08	
30	3	4	Kristinn Þórarinsson	Iceland	2:02.24	
31	3	3	Matías López	Paraguay	2:02.36	
32	3	8	Wen Ren-hau	Chinese Taipei	2:02.93	
33	3	1	Jessie Lacuna	Philippines	2:04.89	
34	3	0	Colin Bensadon	Gibraltar	2:08.55	
35	3	9	Matthew Courtis	Barbados	2:08.60	
36	2	4	Noah Al-Khulaifi	Qatar	2:10.61	
37	2	5	Zandanbal Gunsennorov	Mongolia	2:11.89	
38	2	3	Douglas Miller	Fiji	2:12.36	
39	2	2	Heimanu Sichan	Tahiti	2:12.58	
40	2	7	Khalid Al-Kulaibi	Oman	2:16.68	
41	2	9	Binald Mahmuti	Albania	2:16.99	
42	2	6	Franci Aleksi	Albania	2:17.23	
43	2	1	Faraj Saleh	Bahrain	2:19.45	
44	2	0	Yacop Al-Khulaifi	Qatar	2:20.56	
45	1	4	Ahmed Al-Mutairy	Iraq	2:22.24	
46	1	5	Bobby Akunaii	Papua New Guinea	2:22.64	
47	1	6	Nathan Nades	Papua New Guinea	2:22.93	
48	2	8	J'Air Smith	Antigua and Barbuda	2:25.49	
49	1	3	Tommy Imazu	Guam	2:28.23	
50	1	2	Tanner Poppe	Guam	2:37.09	
—	3	6	Irakli Bolkvadze	Georgia		DNS
—	4	3	Travis Mahoney	Australia		DNS
—	5	6	Federico Turrini	Italy		DNS
—	3	7	Sooud Al-Tayaar	Kuwait		DSQ
—	4	7	Danas Rapšys	Lithuania		DSQ

=== Final ===
The final was held at 19:59.

Rank	Lane	Name	Nationality	Time	Notes
1st place, gold medalist(s)	5	Kosuke Hagino	Japan	1:50.47	AS
2nd place, silver medalist(s)	4	Ryan Lochte	United States	1:51.31	
3rd place, bronze medalist(s)	3	Daiya Seto	Japan	1:51.79	
4	6	Henrique Rodrigues	Brazil	1:52.63	
5	1	Philip Heintz	Germany	1:52.81	
6	7	Marcin Cieślak	Poland	1:53.91	
7	2	Diogo Carvalho	Portugal	1:54.03	
8	7	Yakov Toumarkin	Israel	1:54.36	
