= Swimming at the 2015 World Aquatics Championships – Men's 400 metre individual medley =

Men's 400 metre individual medley at the 2015 World Aquatics Championships
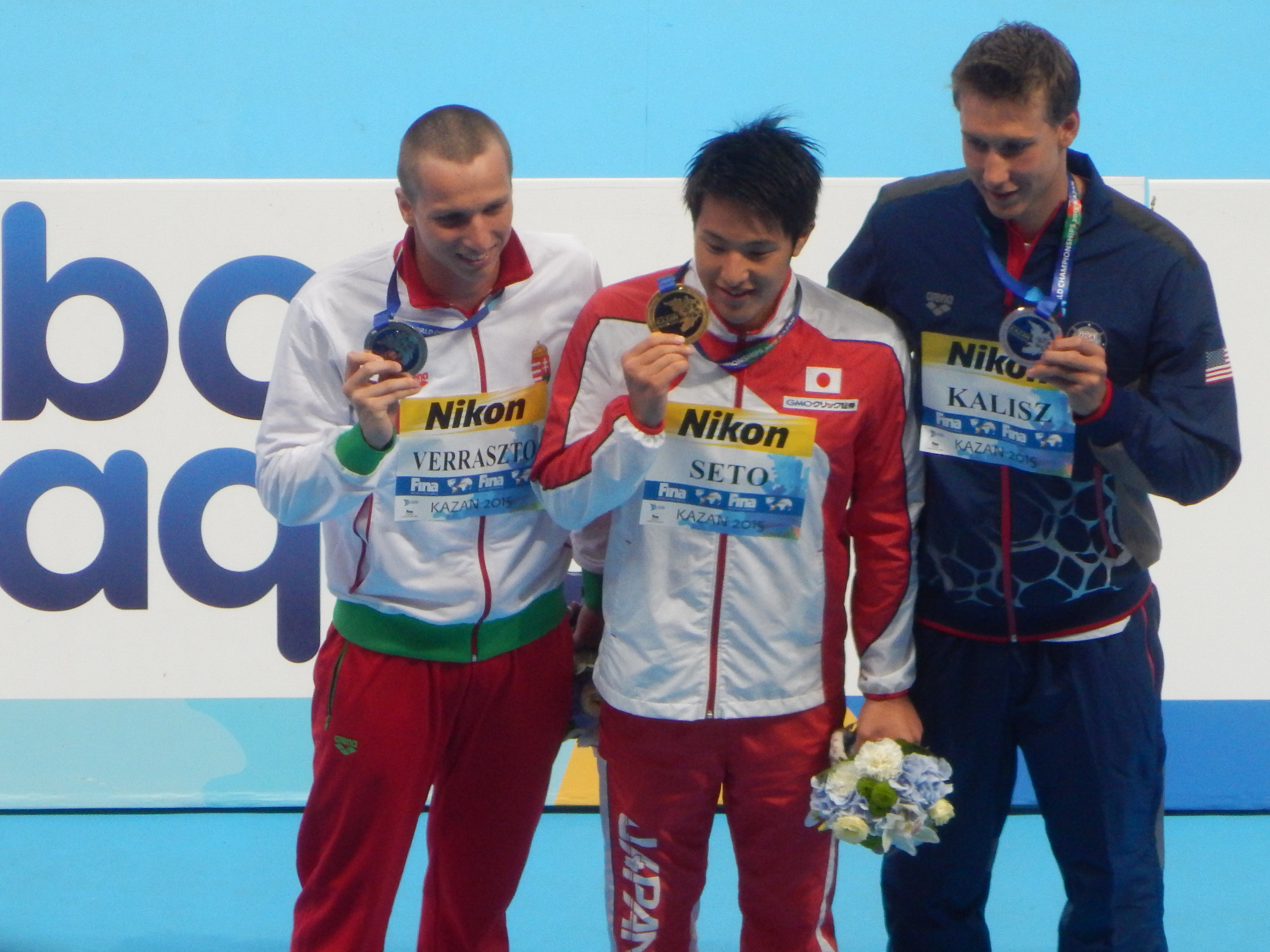
- Medallists
- Dates: 9 August (heats and final)
- Competitors: 41 from 34 nations
- Winning time: 4:08.50

Medalists
gold medal	Daiya Seto	Japan
silver medal	Dávid Verrasztó	Hungary
bronze medal	Chase Kalisz	United States

The 400 metre individual medley competition of the swimming events at the 2015 World Aquatics Championships was held on 9 August with the heats and the final.

== Records ==
Prior to the competition, the existing world and championship records were as follows.

World record	Michael Phelps (USA)	4:03.84	Beijing, China	10 August 2008
Competition record	Michael Phelps (USA)	4:06.22	Melbourne, Australia	1 April 2007

== Results ==
=== Heats ===
The heats were held at 09:30.

Rank	Heat	Lane	Name	Nationality	Time	Notes
1	4	4	Chase Kalisz	United States	4:11.83	Q
2	4	3	Dávid Verrasztó	Hungary	4:11.99	Q
3	5	5	Daiya Seto	Japan	4:12.17	Q
4	5	4	Tyler Clary	United States	4:12.22	Q
5	5	3	Daniel Wallace	Great Britain	4:13.07	Q
6	5	7	Jacob Heidtmann	Germany	4:13.62	Q
7	4	7	Roberto Pavoni	Great Britain	4:13.91	Q
8	5	2	Yang Zhixian	China	4:15.47	Q
9	4	2	Federico Turrini	Italy	4:15.70	
10	4	5	Thomas Fraser-Holmes	Australia	4:15.93	
11	3	4	Aleksandr Osipenko	Russia	4:16.35	
12	3	5	Richárd Nagy	Slovakia	4:16.37	
13	5	1	Benjámin Grátz	Hungary	4:16.69	
14	4	8	Gal Nevo	Israel	4:17.34	
15	5	8	Kevin Wedel	Germany	4:17.42	
16	3	2	Jérémy Desplanches	Switzerland	4:17.90	NR
17	4	0	Semen Makovich	Russia	4:18.61	
18	3	3	Diogo Carvalho	Portugal	4:18.67	
19	5	6	Huang Chaosheng	China	4:19.11	
20	3	1	Jakub Maly	Austria	4:19.20	
21	4	6	Sebastien Rousseau	South Africa	4:20.16	
22	3	6	Pavel Janeček	Czech Republic	4:20.43	
23	3	7	Carlos Omaña	Venezuela	4:20.74	
24	4	1	Marc Sánchez	Spain	4:21.26	
25	1	4	Henrik Christiansen	Norway	4:21.67	
26	5	0	Alexis Santos	Portugal	4:22.35	
27	2	7	Alpkan Örnek	Turkey	4:22.72	
28	5	9	Nathan Capp	New Zealand	4:23.00	
29	1	5	Ahmed Hamdy	Egypt	4:23.02	
30	3	8	Christoph Meier	Liechtenstein	4:23.57	
31	2	5	Pedro Pinotes	Angola	4:23.85	
32	2	1	Robert Žbogar	Slovenia	4:25.10	
33	2	0	Marko Blaževski	North Macedonia	4:25.57	
34	3	0	Uvis Kalniņš	Latvia	4:26.17	
35	2	8	Trần Duy Khôi	Vietnam	4:27.43	
36	1	6	Luis Vega Torres	Cuba	4:29.57	
36	2	4	Wen Ren-hau	Chinese Taipei	4:29.57	
38	2	6	Pang Sheng Jun	Singapore	4:29.61	
39	2	2	Nikola Dimitrov	Bulgaria	4:30.78	
40	1	7	Alvi Hjelm	Faroe Islands	4:33.15	NR
41	1	2	Esteban Araya	Costa Rica	4:40.23	
	1	3	Luis Ventura	Mexico		DNS
	2	3	Ahmed Mathlouthi	Tunisia		DNS
	2	9	Christian Punter	Puerto Rico		DNS
	3	9	Raphaël Stacchiotti	Luxembourg		DNS
	4	9	Thiago Simon	Brazil		DNS

=== Final ===
The final was held at 17:47.

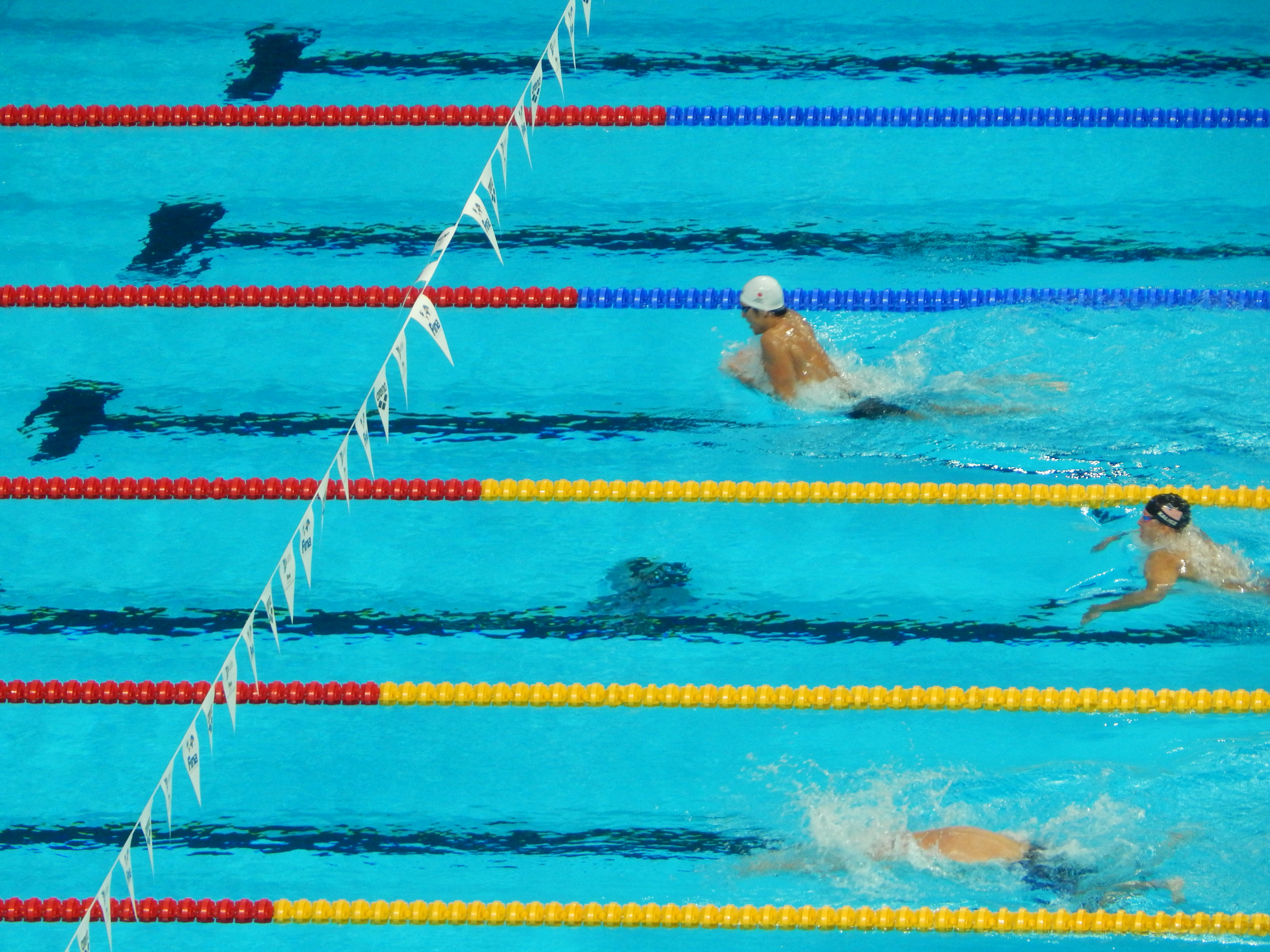
Breaststroke stage of final

Rank	Lane	Name	Nationality	Time	Notes
1st place, gold medalist(s)	3	Daiya Seto	Japan	4:08.50	
2nd place, silver medalist(s)	5	Dávid Verrasztó	Hungary	4:09.90	
3rd place, bronze medalist(s)	4	Chase Kalisz	United States	4:10.05	
4	6	Tyler Clary	United States	4:11.71	
5	7	Jacob Heidtmann	Germany	4:12.08	NR
6	2	Daniel Wallace	Great Britain	4:13.77	
7	1	Roberto Pavoni	Great Britain	4:13.81	
8	8	Yang Zhixian	China	4:16.74	
