= Swimming at the 2016 Summer Olympics – Men's 200 metre individual medley =

Men's 200 metre individual medley at the Games of the XXXI Olympiad
- Venue: Olympic Aquatics Stadium
- Dates: 10 August 2016 (heats & semifinals); 11 August 2016 (final)
- Competitors: 30 from 23 nations
- Winning time: 1:54.66

Medalists
1st place, gold medalist(s)		Michael Phelps	United States
2nd place, silver medalist(s)		Kosuke Hagino	Japan
3rd place, bronze medalist(s)		Wang Shun	China

The men's 200 metre individual medley event at the 2016 Summer Olympics took place on 10–11 August at the Olympic Aquatics Stadium.

== Summary ==
As the most decorated Olympian of all-time, Michael Phelps continued to etch his name into the history records with a first Olympic four-peat in the same individual swimming event. Hanging with some of his career rivals at the final turn, Phelps established a body-length lead over the rest of the field on the freestyle leg to claim his 22nd gold medal and 26th overall in 1:54.66. Trailing almost two seconds behind Phelps, Japan's Kosuke Hagino produced a late surge to snatch the silver with a 1:56.61. Meanwhile, China's Wang Shun took home the bronze in 1:57.05, joining Hagino as the first Asian men to stand on the podium in this event.

Hagino's teammate Hiromasa Fujimori missed out of the medals with a fourth-place time in 1:57.21. Phelps' longtime rival and twelve-time medalist Ryan Lochte seized a brief lead into the halfway point with a signature backstroke swim, but faded down the home stretch to fifth, and missed out on his fourth straight medal in this event with a 1:57.47, a hundredth of a second ahead of Germany's Philip Heintz (1:57.48). Backed by the raucous home crowd, Brazilian medal favorite Thiago Pereira, who got off to an early lead with a powerful butterfly effort, slipped to seventh with a 1:58.02. Great Britain's Daniel Wallace posted an eighth-place finish of 1:58.54 to round out the field.

== Records ==
Prior to this competition, the existing world and Olympic records were as follows.

World record	Ryan Lochte (USA)	1:54.00	Shanghai, China	28 July 2011
Olympic record	Michael Phelps (USA)	1:54.23	Beijing, China	15 August 2008

== Competition format ==
The competition consisted of three rounds: heats, semifinals, and a final. The swimmers with the best 16 times in the heats advanced to the semifinals. The swimmers with the best 8 times in the semifinals advanced to the final. Swim-offs were used as necessary to break ties for advancement to the next round.

== Results ==
=== Heats ===
Rank	Heat	Lane	Name	Nationality	Time	Notes
1	2	4	Ryan Lochte	United States	1:57.38	Q
2	2	6	Philip Heintz	Germany	1:57.59	Q, NR
3	4	4	Michael Phelps	United States	1:58.41	Q
4	2	5	Henrique Rodrigues	Brazil	1:58.56	Q
5	4	5	Thiago Pereira	Brazil	1:58.63	Q
6	3	4	Kosuke Hagino	Japan	1:58.79	Q
7	4	3	Hiromasa Fujimori	Japan	1:58.88	Q
8	3	5	Wang Shun	China	1:58.98	Q
9	3	6	Andreas Vazaios	Greece	1:59.33	Q
10	4	6	Simon Sjödin	Sweden	1:59.41	Q
11	3	3	Daniel Wallace	Great Britain	1:59.44	Q
12	2	1	Alexis Santos	Portugal	1:59.67	Q
12	3	2	Jérémy Desplanches	Switzerland	1:59.67	Q
12	4	2	Eduardo Solaeche	Spain	1:59.67	Q
15	4	7	Ieuan Lloyd	Great Britain	1:59.74	Q
16	4	8	Bradlee Ashby	New Zealand	1:59.77	Q
17	3	1	Gal Nevo	Israel	1:59.80	
18	3	8	Semen Makovich	Russia	1:59.86	
19	4	1	Diogo Carvalho	Portugal	2:00.17	
20	2	2	Travis Mahoney	Australia	2:00.18	
21	1	3	Raphaël Stacchiotti	Luxembourg	2:00.21	
22	1	4	Hu Yixuan	China	2:00.70	
23	1	5	Emmanuel Vanluchene	Belgium	2:01.36	
24	1	6	Uvis Kalniņš	Latvia	2:02.34	
25	2	8	Mohamed Hussein	Egypt	2:02.36	
26	1	7	Marko Blaževski	Macedonia	2:02.54	
27	1	1	Ahmed Mathlouthi	Tunisia	2:04.95	
	2	3	Thomas Fraser-Holmes	Australia	DNS	
	2	7	Federico Turrini	Italy	DNS	
	3	7	Dávid Verrasztó	Hungary	DNS	

=== Semifinals ===
==== Semifinal 1 ====
Rank	Lane	Name	Nationality	Time	Notes
1	3	Kosuke Hagino	Japan	1:57.38	Q
2	6	Wang Shun	China	1:58.12	Q
3	4	Philip Heintz	Germany	1:58.85	Q
4	5	Henrique Rodrigues	Brazil	1:59.23	
5	7	Alexis Santos	Portugal	2:00.08	
6	8	Bradlee Ashby	New Zealand	2:00.45	
7	1	Eduardo Solaeche	Spain	2:00.47	
8	2	Simon Sjödin	Sweden	2:00.81	

==== Semifinal 2 ====
Rank	Lane	Name	Nationality	Time	Notes
1	5	Michael Phelps	United States	1:55.78	Q
2	4	Ryan Lochte	United States	1:56.28	Q
3	3	Thiago Pereira	Brazil	1:57.11	Q
4	7	Daniel Wallace	Great Britain	1:57.97	Q
5	6	Hiromasa Fujimori	Japan	1:58.20	Q
6	8	Ieuan Lloyd	Great Britain	1:59.49	
7	2	Andreas Vazaios	Greece	1:59.54	
8	1	Jérémy Desplanches	Switzerland	2:00.38	

=== Final ===
Rank	Lane	Name	Nationality	Time	Notes
1st place, gold medalist(s)	4	Michael Phelps	United States	1:54.66	
2nd place, silver medalist(s)	6	Kosuke Hagino	Japan	1:56.61	
3rd place, bronze medalist(s)	7	Wang Shun	China	1:57.05	
4	1	Hiromasa Fujimori	Japan	1:57.21	
5	5	Ryan Lochte	United States	1:57.47	
6	8	Philip Heintz	Germany	1:57.48	NR
7	3	Thiago Pereira	Brazil	1:58.02	
8	2	Daniel Wallace	Great Britain	1:58.54	
