= Swimming at the 2014 European Aquatics Championships – Men's 400 metre individual medley =

Men's 400 metre individual medley at the Swimming at the 2014 European Aquatics Championships
- Dates: 24 August
- Competitors: 32 from 21 nations
- Winning time: 4:11.89

Medalists
gold medal	Dávid Verrasztó	Hungary
silver medal	Roberto Pavoni	Great Britain
bronze medal	Federico Turrini	Italy

The Men's 400 metre individual medley competition of the 2014 European Aquatics Championships was held on 24 August.

== Records ==
Prior to the competition, the existing world, European and championship records were as follows.

	Name	Nation	Time	Location	Date
World record	Michael Phelps	United States	4:03.84	Beijing	10 August 2008
European record	László Cseh	Hungary	4:06.16	Beijing	10 August 2008
Championship record	László Cseh	Hungary	4:06.16	Eindhoven	24 March 2008

== Results ==
=== Heats ===
The heats were held at 09:49.

Rank	Heat	Lane	Name	Nationality	Time	Notes
1	3	4	Dávid Verrasztó	Hungary	4:16.78	Q
2	4	4	Roberto Pavoni	Great Britain	4:17.32	Q
3	3	5	Yannick Lebherz	Germany	4:17.94	Q
3	4	5	Federico Turrini	Italy	4:17.94	Q
5	4	1	Jacob Heidtmann	Germany	4:18.75	Q
6	3	3	Alexis Santos	Portugal	4:19.11	Q
7	4	6	Max Litchfield	Great Britain	4:19.23	Q
8	3	8	Richárd Nagy	Slovakia	4:19.27	Q
9	4	2	Gergely Gyurta	Hungary	4:19.46	
10	3	2	Gal Nevo	Israel	4:20.23	
11	4	3	Marc Sánchez	Spain	4:20.87	
12	4	7	Alexander Tikhonov	Russia	4:20.94	
13	2	6	Pavel Janeček	Czech Republic	4:21.15	
14	2	4	Christoph Meier	Liechtenstein	4:21.59	
15	3	6	Maksym Shemberev	Ukraine	4:21.78	
16	3	1	Jakub Maly	Austria	4:21.96	
17	2	3	Jeremy Desplanches	Switzerland	4:22.56	
18	4	0	Ivan Trofimov	Russia	4:24.51	
19	1	6	Andreas Vazaios	Greece	4:25.26	
20	4	9	Dmitry Gorbunov	Russia	4:28.04	
21	2	2	Alpkan Örnek	Turkey	4:28.48	
22	2	1	Alexander Kudashev	Russia	4:28.73	
23	1	3	Ensar Hajder	Bosnia and Herzegovina	4:28.77	
24	3	0	Raphaël Stacchiotti	Luxembourg	4:28.79	
25	2	7	Bogdan Knežević	Serbia	4:29.46	
26	3	7	Matteo Pelizzari	Italy	4:29.67	
27	2	0	Nikola Dimitrov	Bulgaria	4:31.96	
28	2	9	Anton Goncharov	Ukraine	4:32.16	
29	2	8	Uladzimir Zhyharau	Belarus	4:32.16	
30	1	5	Patrik Schwarzenbach	Switzerland	4:32.43	
31	1	4	Irakli Bolkvadze	Georgia	4:33.46	
—	3	9	Etay Gurevich	Israel		DSQ
—	2	5	Diogo Carvalho	Portugal		DNS
—	4	8	Quentin Coton	France		DNS

=== Final ===
The final was held at 16:32.

Rank	Lane	Name	Nationality	Time	Notes
1st place, gold medalist(s)	4	Dávid Verrasztó	Hungary	4:11.89	
2nd place, silver medalist(s)	5	Roberto Pavoni	Great Britain	4:13.75	
3rd place, bronze medalist(s)	3	Federico Turrini	Italy	4:14.15	
4	1	Max Litchfield	Great Britain	4:14.97	
5	6	Yannick Lebherz	Germany	4:16.17	
6	2	Jacob Heidtmann	Germany	4:18.10	
7	7	Alexis Santos	Portugal	4:18.28	
8	8	Richárd Nagy	Slovakia	4:18.66	
