= 2014 FINA World Swimming Championships (25 m) – Men's 400 metre individual medley =

Men's 400 metre individual medley at the 2014 FINA World Swimming Championships (25 m)
- Dates: 4 December
- Competitors: 46 from 40 nations
- Winning time: 3:56.33

Medalists
gold medal	Daiya Seto	Japan
silver medal	Kosuke Hagino	Japan
bronze medal	Dávid Verrasztó	Hungary

The Men's 400 metre individual medley competition of the 2014 FINA World Swimming Championships (25 m) was held on 4 December.

== Records ==
Prior to the competition, the existing world and championship records were as follows.

	Name	Nation	Time	Location	Date
World record Championship record	Ryan Lochte	United States	3:55.50	Dubai	16 December 2010

== Results ==
=== Heats ===
The heats were held at 10:09.

Rank	Heat	Lane	Name	Nationality	Time	Notes
1	5	4	Kosuke Hagino	Japan	4:02.13	Q
2	5	6	Tyler Clary	United States	4:02.27	Q
3	5	7	Sebastien Rousseau	South Africa	4:02.71	Q
4	5	5	Dávid Verrasztó	Hungary	4:02.97	Q
5	4	4	Daiya Seto	Japan	4:03.73	Q
6	5	3	Semen Makovich	Russia	4:06.31	Q
7	4	5	Gal Nevo	Israel	4:06.56	Q
8	4	8	Michael Weiss	United States	4:07.47	Q
9	3	5	Fu Haifeng	China	4:07.49	
10	5	8	Diogo Carvalho	Portugal	4:07.68	
11	4	1	Nathan Capp	New Zealand	4:07.70	
12	5	1	Jakub Maly	Austria	4:07.91	
13	3	6	Richárd Nagy	Slovakia	4:07.94	
14	4	7	Benjámin Grátz	Hungary	4:08.55	
15	4	2	Thiago Simon	Brazil	4:09.02	
16	3	2	Pavel Janeček	Czech Republic	4:09.09	
17	5	0	Jérémy Desplanches	Switzerland	4:09.14	
18	3	0	Robert Žbogar	Slovenia	4:09.38	
19	3	3	Alpkan Örnek	Turkey	4:11.35	
20	5	2	Alexander Tikhonov	Russia	4:11.74	
21	4	6	Travis Mahoney	Australia	4:12.21	
22	3	7	Henrik Christiansen	Norway	4:12.32	
23	4	0	Matteo Pelizzari	Italy	4:12.45	
24	3	8	Aleksey Derlyugov	Uzbekistan	4:12.71	
25	2	6	Marko Blaževski	Macedonia	4:13.04	
26	4	9	Taki Mrabet	Tunisia	4:13.82	
27	3	4	Christoph Meier	Liechtenstein	4:13.92	
28	5	9	Wei Haobo	China	4:15.57	
29	2	4	Esteban Enderica	Ecuador	4:16.74	
30	3	1	Pedro Pinotes	Angola	4:20.09	
31	2	2	Wen Ren-hau	Chinese Taipei	4:20.38	
32	2	3	Andrés Olvera	Mexico	4:20.71	
33	2	5	Lies Nefsi	Algeria	4:22.22	
34	3	9	Irakli Bolkvadze	Georgia	4:23.68	
35	1	1	Nguyễn Ngọc Huỳnh	Vietnam	4:29.39	
36	2	8	Jean Pierre Monteagudo	Peru	4:30.78	
37	2	1	Oli Mortensen	Faroe Islands	4:30.82	
38	1	5	Sanu Debnath	India	4:35.61	
39	1	4	Patrick Groters	Aruba	4:35.73	
40	2	0	Matthew Courtis	Barbados	4:36.99	
41	2	9	Noah Al-Khulaifi	Qatar	4:43.36	
42	1	6	Heimanu Sichan	Tahiti	4:46.13	
43	1	2	Binald Mahmuti	Albania	4:51.55	
44	2	7	Said Saber	Morocco	4:52.62	
45	1	7	Khalid Al-Kulaibi	Oman	5:02.15	
—	4	3	Federico Turrini	Italy		DNS
—	1	3	Franci Aleksi	Albania		DSQ

=== Final ===
The final was held at 18:14.

Rank	Lane	Name	Nationality	Time	Notes
1st place, gold medalist(s)	2	Daiya Seto	Japan	3:56.33	AS
2nd place, silver medalist(s)	4	Kosuke Hagino	Japan	4:01.17	
3rd place, bronze medalist(s)	6	Dávid Verrasztó	Hungary	4:01.82	
4	3	Sebastien Rousseau	South Africa	4:02.00	
5	5	Tyler Clary	United States	4:03.44	
6	8	Michael Weiss	United States	4:05.37	
7	7	Semen Makovich	Russia	4:07.54	
8	1	Gal Nevo	Israel	4:07.99	
