= Swimming at the 2016 European Aquatics Championships – Men's 400 metre individual medley =

Men's 400 metre individual medley at the 2016 European Aquatics Championships
- Dates: 22 May
- Competitors: 40 from 23 nations
- Winning time: 4:13.15

Medalists
gold medal	Dávid Verrasztó	Hungary
silver medal	Richárd Nagy	Slovakia
bronze medal	Federico Turrini	Italy

The Men's 400 metre individual medley competition of the 2016 European Aquatics Championships was held on 22 May 2016.

== Records ==
Prior to the competition, the existing world, European and championship records were as follows.

	Name	Nation	Time	Location	Date
World record	Michael Phelps	United States	4:03.84	Beijing	10 August 2008
European record	László Cseh	Hungary	4:06.16	Beijing	10 August 2008
Championship record	László Cseh	Hungary	4:09.59	Eindhoven	24 March 2008

== Results ==
=== Heats ===
The heats were held at 09:29.

Rank	Heat	Lane	Name	Nationality	Time	Notes
1	5	4	Dávid Verrasztó	Hungary	4:14.49	Q
2	5	5	Max Litchfield	Great Britain	4:15.06	Q
3	4	2	Richárd Nagy	Slovakia	4:15.79	Q
4	4	4	Federico Turrini	Italy	4:17.13	Q
5	5	1	Gal Nevo	Israel	4:17.20	Q
6	4	3	Gergely Gyurta	Hungary	4:17.76	Q
7	5	6	Benjámin Grátz	Hungary	4:18.49	
8	5	2	Alexander Osipenko	Russia	4:18.88	Q
9	4	8	Semen Makovich	Russia	4:19.39	Q
10	4	1	Alexis Santos	Portugal	4:19.82	
11	4	7	Kevin Wedel	Germany	4:19.83	
12	4	0	Pavel Janeček	Czech Republic	4:20.52	
13	5	7	Marc Sanchez Torrens	Spain	4:20.87	
14	5	3	Luca Marin	Italy	4:20.99	
15	5	8	Etay Gurevich	Israel	4:21.08	
16	3	2	Maksym Shemberev	Azerbaijan	4:21.54	
17	5	0	Jérémy Desplanches	Switzerland	4:21.82	
18	3	9	Christoph Meier	Liechtenstein	4:21.87	
19	3	6	Adam Paulsson	Sweden	4:23.01	
20	4	6	Joan Lluís Pons	Spain	4:23.33	
21	4	5	Daniel Wallace	Great Britain	4:23.37	
22	3	5	Ioannis Drymonakos	Greece	4:23.68	
23	2	5	Patrick Stäber	Austria	4:23.94	
24	3	1	Alpkan Örnek	Turkey	4:24.61	
25	1	3	Andrey Zhilkin	Russia	4:25.41	
26	4	9	Raphaël Stacchiotti	Luxembourg	4:25.68	
27	2	6	Ganesh Pedurand	France	4:25.78	
28	3	0	Sebastian Steffan	Austria	4:26.28	
29	3	7	Mykhailo Romanchuk	Ukraine	4:27.08	
30	2	3	Tomas Veloso	Portugal	4:27.25	
31	3	3	Nicolas D'Oriano	France	4:27.54	
31	3	8	Kristian Kron	Sweden	4:28.02	
32	2	4	Osvald Nitski	Estonia	4:28.58	
33	2	2	Nikola Dimitrov	Bulgaria	4:29.05	
34	2	7	Pavol Jelenák	Slovakia	4:29.17	
35	2	9	Illya Teslenko	Ukraine	4:29.76	
36	2	8	Tim Slanschek	Switzerland	4:31.89	
37	2	1	Luca Pfyffer	Switzerland	4:33.07	
38	1	5	Silver Hein	Estonia	4:33.31	
39	2	0	Alvi Hjelm	Faroe Islands	4:42.81	
	3	4	Jakub Maly	Austria	DSQ	
	1	4	Martin Liivamägi	Estonia	DNS	
	5	9	Diogo Carvalho	Portugal	DNS	

=== Final ===
The final was held at 16:40.

Rank	Lane	Name	Nationality	Time	Notes
1st place, gold medalist(s)	4	Dávid Verrasztó	Hungary	4:13.15	
2nd place, silver medalist(s)	3	Richárd Nagy	Slovakia	4:14.16	
3rd place, bronze medalist(s)	6	Federico Turrini	Italy	4:14.74	
4	7	Gergely Gyurta	Hungary	4:14.94	
5	5	Max Litchfield	Great Britain	4:15.10	
6	1	Aleksandr Osipenko	Russia	4:18.07	
7	2	Gal Nevo	Israel	4:18.94	
8	8	Semen Makovich	Russia	4:19.31	
