= List of Georgian records in swimming =

The Georgian records in swimming are the fastest ever performances of swimmers from Georgia, which are recognised and ratified by the Georgian Swimming Federation.

All records were set in finals unless noted otherwise.

== Long course (50 m) ==
=== Men ===
Event	Time		Name	Club	Date	Meet	Location	Ref
50 m freestyle	22.53	sf	Andrea Poladashvili	Georgia	9 July 2026	European Junior Championships	Munich, Germany	
100 m freestyle	50.87		Andrea Poladashvili	-	23 May 2026	Georgian Championships	Kutaisi, Georgia	
200 m freestyle	1:51.61	b	Luka Kukhalashvili	Georgia	11 April 2024	Hungarian Championships	Budapest, Hungary	
400 m freestyle	3:56.05		Irakli Revishvili	Georgia	21 April 2016	Open Championship of The Republic of Belarus	Brest, Belarus	
800 m freestyle	8:14.20		Irakli Revishvili	Georgia	23 April 2016	Open Championship of The Republic of Belarus	Brest, Belarus	
1500 m freestyle	16:07.32		Irakli Revishvili	Georgia	16 March 2008	-	Prague, Czech Republic	
50 m backstroke	25.01	h	Noe Pantskhava	Georgia	16 May 2026	Belgian Championships	Antwerp, Belgium	
100 m backstroke	54.91		Noe Pantskhava	Georgia	17 May 2026	Belgian Championships	Antwerp, Belgium	
200 m backstroke	2:04.55		Noe Pantskhava	Georgia	14 April 2022	Turkish Championships	Edirne, Turkey	
50 m breaststroke	28.40	h	Luka Eradze	Georgia	26 June 2025	European U23 Championships	Šamorín, Slovakia	
100 m breaststroke	1:03.39	h	Lasha Mindiashvili	Georgia	17 July 2025	World University Games	Berlin, Germany	
200 m breaststroke	2:15.86	h	Irakli Bolkvadze	Georgia	31 July 2012	Olympic Games	London, Great Britain	
50 m butterfly	24.57		Noe Pantskhava	G.S.C- Aqua Union	23 March 2026	Kutaisi Open Spring Cup	Kutaisi, Georgia	
100 m butterfly	53.52	h	Nika Tchitchiashvili	Olympic Nice Natation	21 June 2024	French Olympic Trials	Chartres, France	
200 m butterfly	2:02.45	h	Nika Tchitchiashvili	Olympic Nice Natation	20 June 2024	Meeting Nice Camille Muffat	Nice, France	
200 m individual medley	2:03.55	h	Irakli Bolkvadze	Georgia	31 July 2013	World Championships	Barcelona, Spain	
400 m individual medley	4:33.46	h	Irakli Bolkvadze	Georgia	24 August 2014	European Championships	Berlin, Germany	
4×100m freestyle relay	3:27.91		Andrea Poladashvili; Mamuka Shengelia; Alexander Eradze; Noe Pantskhava	G.S.C – Aqua Union	16 July 2026	Georgian Summer Championships	Kutaisi, Georgia	
4×200m freestyle relay								
4×100m medley relay	3:45.62		Noe Pantskhava; Aleksandre Eradze; Giorgi Koiava; Andrea Poladashvili	G.S.C – Aqua Union	16 July 2026	Georgian Summer Championships	Kutaisi, Georgia	

Legend: # – Record awaiting ratification by Georgian Swimming Federation; WR – World record; ER – European record; e – equalled existing record;
Records not set in finals: h – heat; sf – semifinal; r – relay 1st leg; rh – relay heat 1st leg; b – B final; † – en route to final mark; so – swim-off; tt – time trial

=== Women ===
Event	Time		Name	Club	Date	Meet	Location	Ref
50 m freestyle	27.95	h	Mariam Imnadze	Georgia	27 July 2019	World Championships	Gwangju, South Korea	
100 m freestyle	59.97	h	Mariam Imnadze	Georgia	25 July 2019	World Championships	Gwangju, South Korea	
200 m freestyle	2:03.94	h	Anna Kalandadze	Georgia	15 May 2026	Belgian Championships	Antwerp, Belgium	
400 m freestyle	4:16.48		Anna Kalandadze	Georgia	17 May 2026	Belgian Championships	Antwerp, Belgium	
800 m freestyle	8:43.29	h	Anna Kalandadze	Georgia	10 August 2026	European Championships	Paris, France	
1500 m freestyle	16:43.73		Anna Kalandadze	G.S.C – Aqua Union	16 July 2026	Georgian Summer Championships	Kutaisi, Georgia	
50 m backstroke	29.39		Ana Nizharadze	G.S.C – Aqua Union	22 May 2026	Georgian Championships	Kutaisi, Georgia	
100 m backstroke	1:01.93		Ana Nizharadze	G.S.C – Aqua Union	16 July 2026	Georgian Summer Championships	Kutaisi, Georgia	
200 m backstroke	2:14.95		Ana Nizharadze	G.S.C – Aqua Union	16 July 2026	Georgian Summer Championships	Kutaisi, Georgia	
50 m breaststroke	34.91	h	Meri Mumladze	Georgia	29 July 2017	World Championships	Budapest, Hungary	
100 m breaststroke	1:16.70	h	Meri Mumladze	Georgia	24 July 2017	World Championships	Budapest, Hungary	
200 m breaststroke	2:37.78		Anna Kalandadze	G.S.C – Aqua Union	22 May 2026	Georgian Championships	Kutaisi, Georgia	
50 m butterfly	27.25		Ana Nizharadze	Georgia	16 May 2026	Belgian Championships	Antwerp, Belgium	
100 m butterfly	59.41		Ana Nizharadze	Georgia	15 May 2026	Belgian Championships	Antwerp, Belgium	
200 m butterfly	2:15.68		Ana Nizharadze	G.S.C – Aqua Union	16 July 2026	Georgian Summer Championships	Kutaisi, Georgia	
200 m individual medley								
400 m individual medley								
4×100 m freestyle relay	4:03.57		Ana Nizharadze; Ana Shiukaeva; Anastasia Mikelashvili; Anna Kalandadze	G.S.C – Aqua Union	26 March 2026	Kutaisi Open Spring Cup	Kutaisi, Georgia	
4×200 m freestyle relay								
4×100 m medley relay	4:20.68		Ana Ivanova (1:05.07); Anna Kalandadze (1:14.54); Ana Nizharadze (1:00.51); Anastasia Mikelashvili (1:00.56)	Georgia	17 May 2026	Belgian Championships	Antwerp, Belgium	

Legend: # – Record awaiting ratification by Georgian Swimming Federation; WR – World record; ER – European record; e – equalled existing record;
Records not set in finals: h – heat; sf – semifinal; r – relay 1st leg; rh – relay heat 1st leg; b – B final; † – en route to final mark; so – swim-off; tt – time trial

== Short course (25 m) ==
=== Men ===
Event	Time		Name	Club	Date	Meet	Location	Ref
50 m freestyle	22.15	h	Noe Pantskhava	Georgia	1 October 2026	World Cup	Baku, Azerbaijan	
100 m freestyle	49.24		Andria Chkhikvadze	Georgian Swimmers	14 November 2026	Georgian Championships	Tbilisi, Georgia	
200 m freestyle	1:47.51	h	Luka Kukhalashvili	Georgia	5 November 2021	European Championships	Kazan, Russia	
400 m freestyle	3:50.83	h	Irakli Revishvili	Georgia	5 December 2014	World Championships	Doha, Qatar	
800 m freestyle	8:20.28	†	Irakli Revishvili	Georgia	13 April 2008	World Championships	Manchester, Great Britain	
1500 m freestyle	15:55.17		Irakli Revishvili	Georgia	19 December 2010	World Championships	Dubai, United Arab Emirates	
50 m backstroke	24.17	h	Noe Pantskhava	Georgia	2 October 2026	World Cup	Baku, Azerbaijan	
100 m backstroke	52.18	h	Noe Pantskhava	Georgia	13 December 2024	World Championships	Budapest, Hungary	
200 m backstroke	2:00.33		Noe Pantskhava	G.S.C- Aqua Union	14 November 2026	Georgian Championships	Tbilisi, Georgia	
50 m breaststroke	27.66	b	Luka Eradze	Georgia	7 November 2026	Hungarian Championships	Kaposvár, Hungary	
100 m breaststroke	1:00.30		Aleksandre Eradze	-	15 November 2026	Georgian Championships	Tbilisi, Georgia	
200 m breaststroke	2:12.17	h	Irakli Bolkvadze	Georgia	5 December 2014	World Championships	Doha, Qatar	
50 m butterfly	23.50		Noe Pantskhava	G.S.C- Aqua Union	13 November 2026	Georgian Championships	Tbilisi, Georgia	
100 m butterfly	53.67	h	Teimuraz Kobakhidze	Georgia	4 December 2014	World Championships	Doha, Qatar	
200 m butterfly	1:59.46	h	Teimuraz Kobakhidze	Georgia	7 December 2014	World Championships	Doha, Qatar	
100m individual medley	56.11	h	Teimuraz Kobakhidze	Georgia	6 December 2014	World Championships	Doha, Qatar	
200m individual medley	2:07.13	h	Giorgi Mtvralashvili	Georgia	17 December 2010	World Championships	Dubai, United Arab Emirates	
400m individual medley	4:23.68	h	Irakli Bolkvadze	Georgia	4 December 2014	World Championships	Doha, Qatar	
4×50 m freestyle relay								
4×100 m freestyle relay								
4×200 m freestyle relay								
4×50 m medley relay								
4×100 m medley relay								

Legend: # – Record awaiting ratification by Georgian Swimming Federation; WR – World record; ER – European record; e – equalled existing record;
Records not set in finals: h – heat; sf – semifinal; r – relay 1st leg; rh – relay heat 1st leg; b – B final; † – en route to final mark; so – swim-off; tt – time trial

=== Women ===
Event	Time		Name	Club	Date	Meet	Location	Ref
50 m freestyle	27.37	h	Mariam Imnadze	Georgia	15 December 2018	World Championships	Hangzhou, China	
100 m freestyle	58.50	h, †	Anna Kalandadze	Georgia	2 October 2026	World Cup	Baku, Azerbaijan	
200 m freestyle	1:59.91	h	Anna Kalandadze	Georgia	2 October 2026	World Cup	Baku, Azerbaijan	
400 m freestyle	4:07.05		Anna Kalandadze	Georgia	1 October 2026	World Cup	Baku, Azerbaijan	
800 m freestyle	8:25.95		Anna Kalandadze	Georgia	3 October 2026	World Cup	Baku, Azerbaijan	
1500 m freestyle	16:10.23		Anna Kalandadze	G.S.C- Aqua Union	15 November 2026	Georgian Championships	Tbilisi, Georgia	
50 m backstroke	28.11		Ana Nizharadze	G.S.C- Aqua Union	15 November 2026	Georgian Championships	Tbilisi, Georgia	
100 m backstroke	1:00.24		Ana Nizharadze	G.S.C- Aqua Union	13 November 2026	Georgian Championships	Tbilisi, Georgia	
200 m backstroke	2:12.18		Ana Nizharadze	G.S.C- Aqua Union	14 November 2026	Georgian Championships	Tbilisi, Georgia	
50 m breaststroke								
100 m breaststroke								
200 m breaststroke	2:32.22		Anna Kalandadze	G.S.C- Aqua Union	14 November 2026	Georgian Championships	Tbilisi, Georgia	
50 m butterfly	26.78		Ana Nizharadze	G.S.C- Aqua Union	14 November 2026	Georgian Championships	Tbilisi, Georgia	
100 m butterfly	58.57		Ana Nizharadze	G.S.C- Aqua Union	13 November 2026	Georgian Championships	Tbilisi, Georgia	
200 m butterfly	2:12.02		Ana Nizharadze	G.S.C- Aqua Union	15 November 2026	Georgian Championships	Tbilisi, Georgia	
100 m individual medley	1:04.60		Ana Nizharadze	G.S.C- Aqua Union	14 November 2026	Georgian Championships	Tbilisi, Georgia	
200 m individual medley	2:18.97		Anna Kalandadze	G.S.C- Aqua Union	13 November 2026	Georgian Championships	Tbilisi, Georgia	
400 m individual medley								
4×50 m freestyle relay								
4×100 m freestyle relay								
4×200 m freestyle relay								
4×50 m medley relay								
4×100 m medley relay								

Legend: # – Record awaiting ratification by Georgian Swimming Federation; WR – World record; ER – European record; e – equalled existing record;
Records not set in finals: h – heat; sf – semifinal; r – relay 1st leg; rh – relay heat 1st leg; b – B final; † – en route to final mark; so – swim-off; tt – time trial
