= 2012 FINA World Swimming Championships (25 m) – Men's 400 metre individual medley =

Men's 400m Individual Medley at the 2012 Short Course Worlds
- Dates: 13 December (heats and final)
- Winning time: 3:59.15

Medalists
gold medal	Daiya Seto	Japan
silver medal	László Cseh	Hungary
bronze medal	Dávid Verrasztó	Hungary

The men's 400 metre individual medley event at the 11th FINA World Swimming Championships (25m) took place 13 December 2012 at the Sinan Erdem Dome.

== Records ==
Prior to this competition, the existing world and championship records were as follows.

	Name	Nation	Time	Location	Date
World record Championship record	Ryan Lochte	United States	3:55.50	Dubai	16 December 2010

No new records were set during this competition.

== Results ==
=== Heats ===
43 swimmers participated in 5 heats.

Rank	Heat	Lane	Name	Time	Notes
1	5	4	Daiya Seto (JPN)	4:04.28	Q
2	4	4	László Cseh (HUN)	4:04.61	Q
3	4	5	Gal Nevo (ISR)	4:05.99	Q
4	3	4	Dávid Verrasztó (HUN)	4:06.64	Q
5	4	3	Diogo Carvalho (POR)	4:07.42	Q
6	5	5	Kosuke Hagino (JPN)	4:07.78	Q
7	3	5	Chris Christensen (DEN)	4:08.38	Q
8	5	1	Michael Weiss (USA)	4:08.46	Q
9	3	3	Travis Mahoney (AUS)	4:09.59	
10	4	0	Liu Weijia (CHN)	4:09.76	
11	4	6	Jakub Maly (AUT)	4:10.18	
12	5	9	Stephen Schmuhl (USA)	4:10.38	
13	4	1	Michael Meyer (RSA)	4:11.08	
14	5	2	Roberto Pavoni (GBR)	4:11.17	
15	4	2	Jan Świtkowski (POL)	4:11.60	
16	3	6	Yury Suvorau (BLR)	4:12.36	
17	5	6	Victor Bromer (DEN)	4:12.70	
18	3	1	Matthew Johnson (GBR)	4:13.75	
19	5	8	Aleksey Derlyugov (UZB)	4:14.42	
20	3	9	Alexis Santos (POR)	4:14.44	
21	3	2	Esteban Enderica (ECU)	4:14.60	
22	5	3	Maksym Shemberev (UKR)	4:14.89	
23	4	7	Taki Mrabet (TUN)	4:15.52	
24	4	8	Karol Zaczynski (POL)	4:15.55	
25	5	7	Pedro Pinotes (ANG)	4:16.20	
26	3	8	Christoph Meier (LIE)	4:17.68	
27	3	7	Kristian Kron (SWE)	4:18.17	
28	2	3	Esteban Paz (ARG)	4:18.54	NR
29	2	5	Richárd Nagy (SVK)	4:22.01	NR
30	3	0	Pang Sheng Jun (SIN)	4:23.98	
31	2	6	Marko Blaževski (MKD)	4:24.62	
32	1	6	Andrew Rutherford (BOL)	4:26.13	NR
33	2	2	Ayman Klzie (SYR)	4:26.32	
34	4	9	Vasilii Danilov (KGZ)	4:26.70	
35	2	1	Jean Luis Gómez (DOM)	4:28.05	
36	5	0	Sobitjon Amilov (UZB)	4:29.28	
37	2	7	Yeziel Morales (PUR)	4:30.70	
38	1	5	Charles Alexander Keller (PAN)	4:32.10	
39	2	8	Agnishwar Jayaprakash (IND)	4:35.81	
40	2	0	Arvind Mani (IND)	4:39.80	
41	2	9	Khader Baqleh (JOR)	4:54.29	
	1	4	Franc Aleksi (ALB)	DSQ	
	2	4	Anton Sveinn McKee (ISL)	DSQ	
	1	3	Marcos Lavado (VEN)	DNS	

=== Final ===
The final was held at 19:10.

Rank	Lane	Name	Nationality	Time	Notes
1st place, gold medalist(s)	4	Daiya Seto	Japan	3:59.15	AS
2nd place, silver medalist(s)	5	László Cseh	Hungary	4:00.50	
3rd place, bronze medalist(s)	6	Dávid Verrasztó	Hungary	4:02.87	
4	7	Kosuke Hagino	Japan	4:04.13	
5	3	Gal Nevo	Israel	4:04.29	NR
6	1	Chris Christensen	Denmark	4:06.81	
7	8	Michael Weiss	United States	4:07.67	
8	2	Diogo Carvalho	Portugal	4:09.95	
