= 2012 FINA World Swimming Championships (25 m) – Men's 100 metre individual medley =

Men's 100m Individual Medley at the 2012 Short Course Worlds
- Dates: 15 December (heats and semifinals); 16 December (final)
- Winning time: 51.21

Medalists
gold medal	Ryan Lochte	United States
silver medal	Kenneth To	Australia
bronze medal	George Bovell	Trinidad and Tobago

The men's 100 metre individual medley event at the 11th FINA World Swimming Championships (25m) took place 15 – 16 December 2012 at the Sinan Erdem Dome. The final was won by American Ryan Lochte in a time of 51.21. In the semifinals, Lochte broke Peter Mankoč's world record of 50.76 set in 2009 with a time of 50.71.

== Records ==
Prior to this competition, the existing world and championship records were as follows:

	Name	Nation	Time	Location	Date
World record	Peter Mankoč	Slovenia	50.76	Istanbul	12 December 2009
Championship record	Ryan Lochte	United States	50.81	Dubai	18 December 2010

The following records were established during the competition:

Date	Event	Name	Nation	Time	Record
15 December	Semifinals	Ryan Lochte	United States	50.71	WR

== Results ==
=== Heats ===
Rank	Heat	Lane	Name	Time	Notes
1	2	5	Ryan Lochte (USA)	51.75	Q
2	8	4	Kenneth To (AUS)	52.58	Q
3	7	3	Simon Sjödin (SWE)	53.08	Q, NR
4	9	7	Daiya Seto (JPN)	53.49	Q
5	9	4	George Bovell (TRI)	53.51	Q
6	8	3	Takuro Fujii (JPN)	53.57	Q
7	7	2	Gal Nevo (ISR)	53.61	Q
8	7	6	Diogo Carvalho (POR)	53.64	Q
9	3	1	Conor Dwyer (USA)	53.68	Q
10	8	5	Martti Aljand (EST)	53.82	Q
11	9	5	Peter Mankoč (SLO)	53.92	Q
12	8	8	Jake Tapp (CAN)	54.06	Q
13	8	6	Daniel Skaaning (DEN)	54.13	Q
14	6	5	Robert Žbogar (SLO)	54.21	Q
15	8	1	Jan Świtkowski (POL)	54.32	Q
16	2	0	Mindaugas Sadauskas (LTU)	54.43	Q
17	9	3	Dmitry Zhilin (RUS)	54.44	
18	9	8	Aleksey Derlyugov (UZB)	54.50	NR
19	9	1	Chris Christensen (DEN)	54.55	
20	7	7	Sun Xiaolei (CHN)	54.59	
21	8	2	Darren Murray (RSA)	54.64	
22	8	0	Andreas Vazaios (GRE)	54.72	
23	9	2	Dominik Straga (CRO)	54.92	
24	6	6	Dávid Verrasztó (HUN)	55.07	
25	7	8	Taki Mrabet (TUN)	55.26	
26	7	5	Coleman Allen (CAN)	55.40	
27	3	8	Ensar Hajder (BIH)	55.53	NR
28	7	1	Jason Dunford (KEN)	55.55	NR
29	2	4	Liu Weijia (CHN)	55.57	
30	9	0	Orel Oral (TUR)	55.93	
31	6	4	Alex Hernandez Medina (CUB)	56.04	
32	7	0	Vasilii Danilov (KGZ)	56.47	
33	3	0	Matthew Johnson (GBR)	57.15	
34	8	9	Quah Zheng Wen (SIN)	57.23	
35	6	2	Agnishwar Jayaprakash (IND)	57.28	
36	6	3	Jordy Groters (ARU)	57.63	
37	5	2	Eliebenezer San Jose Wong (NMI)	57.89	
38	7	9	Pang Sheng Jun (SIN)	57.91	
39	2	3	Awse Ma'aya (JOR)	58.35	
40	3	2	Marko Blaževski (MKD)	58.59	
41	2	7	Damjan Petrovski (MKD)	59.00	
42	6	8	Arvind Mani (IND)	59.82	
43	5	4	Enrique Duran Garcia-Bedoya (PER)	59.84	
44	2	2	Obaid Al-Jasmi (UAE)	59.88	
45	5	3	Colin Bensadon (GIB)	59.95	
46	6	7	Josue Dominguez Ramos (DOM)	1:00.06	
47	3	6	Jordan Augier (LCA)	1:00.22	NR
48	3	9	Lao Kuan Fong (MAC)	1:00.53	
49	3	7	Chao Man Hou (MAC)	1:00.65	
50	6	9	Paul Elaisa (FIJ)	1:01.05	
51	5	7	Fernando Medrano Medina (NCA)	1:01.53	
52	6	0	Omar Yousif (BHR)	1:01.60	
53	6	1	Julian Harding (MLT)	1:01.68	
54	4	4	Julien Brice (LCA)	1:02.37	
55	5	0	Ralph Goveia (ZAM)	1:02.46	
56	5	1	Kensuke Kimura (NMI)	1:02.56	
57	1	3	David van der Colff (BOT)	1:03.49	
58	5	8	C. Andrews (COK)	1:03.57	
59	5	9	Omar Omar (QAT)	1:04.64	
60	4	5	Azim Azimov (TKM)	1:05.28	
61	4	6	Khalid Baba (BHR)	1:06.82	
62	2	6	Kgosietsile Molefinyane (BOT)	1:07.16	
63	4	3	Valentin Gorshkov (TKM)	1:07.44	
64	4	2	Michael Hitchcock (GIB)	1:09.11	
65	4	8	Franc Aleksi (ALB)	1:09.66	
66	5	5	Giordan Harris (MHL)	1:09.69	
67	4	0	Brandon Schuster (SAM)	1:10.04	
68	1	5	Mamadou Amara Soumare (MLI)	1:11.51	
69	3	4	Jamal Tamasese (SAM)	1:12.72	
70	4	1	Conrad Gaira (UGA)	1:13.39	
71	4	9	Naser Hassan (QAT)	1:14.99	
72	3	5	Nikolas Sylvester (VIN)	1:15.21	
73	3	3	Storm Halbich (VIN)	1:17.56	
	2	1	Rhudi Ayi Mensah Quaye (GHA)	DSQ	
	4	7	Tepaia Zac Payne (COK)	DSQ	
	1	4	Alexis Santos (POR)	DNS	
	2	8	Luis Rafael Rojas Martinez (VEN)	DNS	
	5	6	Omar Mithqal (JOR)	DNS	
	7	4	Vladimir Morozov (RUS)	DNS	
	8	7	Aschwin Wildeboer (ESP)	DNS	
	9	6	Thiago Simon (BRA)	DNS	
	9	9	Gabriel Melconian Alvez (URU)	DNS	

=== Semifinals ===
Rank	Heat	Lane	Name	Nationality	Time	Notes
1	2	4	Ryan Lochte	United States	50.71	WR
2	1	4	Kenneth To	Australia	51.47	
3	2	3	George Bovell	Trinidad and Tobago	51.66	
4	2	5	Simon Sjödin	Sweden	52.51	NR
5	2	2	Conor Dwyer	United States	52.74	
6	2	7	Peter Mankoč	Slovenia	52.80	
7	1	5	Daiya Seto	Japan	53.10	
8	1	3	Takuro Fujii	Japan	53.14	
9	2	6	Gal Nevo	Israel	53.25	
10	1	2	Martti Aljand	Estonia	53.31	
11	1	7	Jake Tapp	Canada	53.67	
12	1	6	Diogo Carvalho	Portugal	53.69	
13	2	1	Daniel Skaaning	Denmark	54.05	
14	2	8	Jan Świtkowski	Poland	54.21	
15	1	1	Robert Žbogar	Slovenia	54.28	
16	1	8	Mindaugas Sadauskas	Lithuania	54.85	

=== Final ===
The final was held at 19:37.

Rank	Lane	Name	Nationality	Time	Notes
1st place, gold medalist(s)	4	Ryan Lochte	United States	51.21	
2nd place, silver medalist(s)	5	Kenneth To	Australia	51.38	OC
3rd place, bronze medalist(s)	3	George Bovell	Trinidad and Tobago	51.66	
4	7	Peter Mankoč	Slovenia	52.51	
5	6	Simon Sjödin	Sweden	52.63	
6	2	Conor Dwyer	United States	52.83	
7	8	Takuro Fujii	Japan	53.11	
8	1	Daiya Seto	Japan	53.15	
