= Swimming at the 2018 European Aquatics Championships – Men's 200 metre individual medley =

Men's 200 metre individual medley at the 2018 European Aquatics Championships
- Venue: Tollcross International Swimming Centre
- Dates: 5 August (heats and semifinals); 6 August (final)
- Competitors: 32 from 20 nations
- Winning time: 1:57.04

Medalists
gold medal	Jérémy Desplanches	Switzerland
silver medal	Philip Heintz	Germany
bronze medal	Max Litchfield	Great Britain

The Men's 200 metre individual medley competition of the 2018 European Aquatics Championships was held on 5 and 6 August 2018.

== Records ==
Prior to the competition, the existing world and championship records were as follows.

	Name	Nation	Time	Location	Date
World record	Ryan Lochte	United States	1:54.00	Shanghai	28 July 2011
European record	László Cseh	Hungary	1:55.18	Rome	29 July 2009
Championship record	László Cseh	Hungary	1:56.66	Debrecen	23 May 2012

== Results ==
=== Heats ===
The heats were started on 5 August at 09:30.

Rank	Heat	Lane	Name	Nationality	Time	Notes
1	3	3	Mark Szaranek	Great Britain	1:58.07	Q
2	3	4	Max Litchfield	Great Britain	1:58.12	Q
3	4	5	Duncan Scott	Great Britain	1:58.57	
4	2	5	Hugo González	Spain	1:58.99	Q
5	3	5	Andreas Vazaios	Greece	1:59.40	Q
6	2	4	Jérémy Desplanches	Switzerland	1:59.88	Q
7	2	6	Semen Makovich	Russia	2:00.06	Q
8	4	6	Alexis Santos	Portugal	2:00.24	Q
9	2	3	Thomas Dean	Great Britain	2:00.32	
10	4	4	Philip Heintz	Germany	2:00.34	Q
11	3	1	Simon Sjödin	Sweden	2:00.65	Q
12	2	7	Maxim Stupin	Russia	2:00.72	Q
13	2	2	Diogo Carvalho	Portugal	2:00.84	Q
13	2	1	Arjan Knipping	Netherlands	2:00.84	Q
15	3	6	Dávid Verrasztó	Hungary	2:00.94	Q
16	3	2	Gabriel Lópes	Portugal	2:01.42	
17	4	3	Andrey Zhilkin	Russia	2:01.54	
18	4	8	Dawid Szwedzki	Poland	2:02.03	Q
19	4	7	Etay Gurevich	Israel	2:02.05	Q
20	4	1	Raphaël Stacchiotti	Luxembourg	2:02.34	Q
20	3	9	Metin Aydın	Turkey	2:02.34	
22	3	7	Georgios Spanoudakis	Greece	2:02.56	
23	4	2	Federico Turrini	Italy	2:03.19	
24	2	0	Povilas Strazdas	Lithuania	2:03.63	
25	2	8	Christoph Meier	Liechtenstein	2:03.86	
26	4	0	Apostolos Papastamos	Greece	2:04.55	
27	4	9	Samet Alkan	Turkey	2:04.81	
28	3	8	Teemu Vuorela	Finland	2:04.85	
29	3	0	Alpkan Örnek	Turkey	2:05.39	
30	1	3	Batuhan Hakan	Turkey	2:07.08	
31	1	4	Alvi Hjelm	Faroe Islands	2:07.88	
32	1	5	Cevin Siim	Estonia	2:08.45	

=== Semifinals ===
The semifinals were started on 5 August at 18:26.

==== Semifinal 1 ====
Rank	Lane	Name	Nationality	Time	Notes
1	6	Philip Heintz	Germany	1:57.56	Q
2	4	Max Litchfield	Great Britain	1:57.62	Q
3	5	Andreas Vazaios	Greece	1:58.48	Q
4	3	Semen Makovich	Russia	2:00.00	Q
5	7	Diogo Carvalho	Portugal	2:00.51	
6	2	Maxim Stupin	Russia	2:01.15	
7	8	Raphaël Stacchiotti	Luxembourg	2:01.99	
8	1	Dawid Szwedzki	Poland	2:03.64	

==== Semifinal 2 ====
Rank	Lane	Name	Nationality	Time	Notes
1	3	Jérémy Desplanches	Switzerland	1:57.99	Q
2	4	Mark Szaranek	Great Britain	1:58.22	Q
3	5	Hugo González	Spain	1:59.28	Q
4	6	Alexis Santos	Portugal	1:59.89	Q
5	2	Simon Sjödin	Sweden	2:00.45	
6	7	Arjan Knipping	Netherlands	2:00.87	
7	1	Dávid Verrasztó	Hungary	2:00.90	
8	8	Etay Gurevich	Israel	2:02.77	

=== Final ===
The final was started on 6 August at 18:15.

Rank	Lane	Name	Nationality	Time	Notes
1st place, gold medalist(s)	3	Jérémy Desplanches	Switzerland	1:57.04	
2nd place, silver medalist(s)	4	Philip Heintz	Germany	1:57.83	
3rd place, bronze medalist(s)	5	Max Litchfield	Great Britain	1:57.96	
4	7	Hugo González	Spain	1:58.77	
5	6	Mark Szaranek	Great Britain	1:58.88	
5	2	Andreas Vazaios	Greece	1:58.88	
7	1	Alexis Santos	Portugal	1:59.99	
8	8	Semen Makovich	Russia	2:00.07	
