= Swimming at the 2014 European Aquatics Championships – Men's 200 metre butterfly =

Men's 200 Metre Butterfly at the Swimming at the 2014 European Aquatics Championships
- Dates: 20–21 August
- Competitors: 34 from 23 nations
- Winning time: 1:55.29

Medalists
gold medal	Viktor Bromer	Denmark
silver medal	Bence Biczó	Hungary
bronze medal	Paweł Korzeniowski	Poland

The men's 200 metre butterfly competition of the 2014 European Aquatics Championships was held on 20–21 August.

== Records ==
Prior to the competition, the existing world, European and championship records were as follows.

	Name	Nation	Time	Location	Date
World record	Michael Phelps	United States	1:51.51	Rome	29 July 2009
European record	László Cseh	Hungary	1:52.70	Beijing	13 August 2008
Championship record	Paweł Korzeniowski	Poland	1:54.38	Eindhoven	21 March 2008

== Results ==
=== Heats ===
The heats were held at 09:30.

Rank	Heat	Lane	Name	Nationality	Time	Notes
1	2	4	Viktor Bromer	Denmark	1:55.43	Q
2	4	6	Evgeny Koptelov	Russia	1:56.37	Q
3	3	4	Bence Biczó	Hungary	1:56.63	Q
4	3	5	Louis Croenen	Belgium	1:56.66	Q
5	3	2	Francesco Pavone	Italy	1:57.15	Q
6	2	6	Matteo Pelizzari	Italy	1:57.67	Q
7	3	3	Aleksandr Kudashev	Russia	1:57.70	Q
8	2	3	Stefanos Dimitriadis	Greece	1:57.77	Q
9	2	7	Carlos Peralta	Spain	1:57.78	Q
10	2	5	Cameron Brodie	Great Britain	1:57.81	Q
11	4	5	Nikolay Skvortsov	Russia	1:57.93	
12	4	1	Egon van der Straeten	Belgium	1:58.11	Q
13	3	7	Alexandru Coci	Romania	1:58.15	Q
14	4	4	Paweł Korzeniowski	Poland	1:58.29	Q
15	3	6	Jordan Coelho	France	1:58.36	Q
16	4	0	Konstantinos Markozis	Greece	1:58.48	Q
17	2	0	Robert Žbogar	Slovenia	1:58.55	Q
18	4	3	Velimir Stjepanović	Serbia	1:58.60	
19	1	4	Nico van Duijn	Switzerland	1:59.04	
20	4	7	Bence Pulai	Hungary	1:59.66	
21	1	6	Sindri Jakobsson	Norway	1:59.80	
22	1	5	Jesper Björk	Sweden	2:00.01	
23	2	8	Paul Lemaire	France	2:00.09	
24	2	1	Brendan Hyland	Ireland	2:00.09	
24	4	8	Pedro Oliveira	Portugal	2:00.09	
26	3	0	Nuno Quintanilha	Portugal	2:00.83	
27	2	2	Tom Kremer	Israel	2:01.07	
28	4	9	Jan Šefl	Czech Republic	2:01.60	
29	3	8	Thomas Vilaceca	France	2:01.69	
30	2	9	Filip Milcevic	Austria	2:02.67	
31	1	3	Tomas Havránek	Czech Republic	2:02.82	
32	1	2	Etay Gurevich	Israel	2:03.10	
33	1	1	Teimuraz Kobakhidze	Georgia	2:03.77	
34	1	7	Nikola Dimitrov	Bulgaria	2:05.49	
—	3	1	Simon Sjödin	Sweden		DNS
—	3	9	Jay Lelliott	Great Britain		DNS
—	4	2	Roberto Pavoni	Great Britain		DNS

=== Semifinals ===
The semifinals were held at 19:01.

==== Semifinal 1 ====
Rank	Lane	Name	Nationality	Time	Notes
1	5	Louis Croenen	Belgium	1:56.46	Q
2	4	Evgeni Koptelov	Russia	1:56.74	Q
3	3	Matteo Pelizzari	Italy	1:56.78	Q
4	6	Stefanos Dimitriadis	Greece	1:57.03	Q
5	1	Jordan Coelho	France	1:57.52	
6	8	Robert Žbogar	Slovenia	1:57.64	
7	2	Cameron Brodie	Great Britain	1:58.31	
8	7	Alexandru Coci	Romania	1:58.42	

==== Semifinal 2 ====
Rank	Lane	Name	Nationality	Time	Notes
1	4	Viktor Bromer	Denmark	1:55.55	Q
2	1	Paweł Korzeniowski	Poland	1:56.43	Q
3	5	Bence Biczó	Hungary	1:56.44	Q
4	2	Carlos Peralta	Spain	1:57.23	Q
5	3	Francesco Pavone	Italy	1:57.35	
6	6	Aleksandr Kudashev	Russia	1:57.41	
7	7	Egon van der Straeten	Belgium	1:58.19	
8	8	Konstantinos Markozis	Greece	1:58.89	

=== Final ===
The final was held at 19:02.

Rank	Lane	Name	Nationality	Time	Notes
1st place, gold medalist(s)	4	Viktor Bromer	Denmark	1:55.29	
2nd place, silver medalist(s)	3	Bence Biczó	Hungary	1:55.62	
3rd place, bronze medalist(s)	5	Paweł Korzeniowski	Poland	1:55.74	
4	6	Louis Croenen	Belgium	1:56.06	
5	7	Matteo Pelizzari	Italy	1:56.72	
6	8	Carlos Peralta	Spain	1:57.01	
7	1	Stefanos Dimitriadis	Greece	1:57.10	
8	2	Evgeni Koptelov	Russia	1:57.14	
