= Hu Yixuan (swimmer) =

Chinese swimmer

Personal information
- Born: 23 October 1994 (age 31)

Sport
- Sport: Swimming

Hu Yixuan (born 23 October 1994) is a Chinese swimmer. He competed in the men's 200 metre individual medley event at the 2016 Summer Olympics.
