= 2015 European Short Course Swimming Championships =

Water sport competitions

- Host city: Netanya, Israel
- Date(s): 2–6 December
- Venue(s): Wingate Institute
- Nations participating: 48
- Athletes participating: 500

The 2015 European Short Course Swimming Championships (25 m) took place in Netanya, Israel, from 2–6 December 2015. They were originally scheduled to be held in January 2015, but the LEN moved the event to December. The venue of the event was the brand new swimming complex of the Wingate Institute. This complex features an Olympic-size pool with 10 lanes and 3 meter depth, backed by the latest built-in filtration systems, an 8-lane 50 m pool and a 6-lane 25 m pool.

The swimmer of the meet honors went to Katinka Hosszú of Hungary and Gregorio Paltrinieri of Italy. Hosszú won six gold medals and one silver, breaking two world records and six championship records, while Paltrinieri won one gold medal in a world record time.

== Records broken ==
World records
Event	Date	Round	Name	Nationality	Time	Day	References
400 m individual medley (record progression)	2 December	Heats	Katinka Hosszú	Hungary	4:19.46	1	
100 m individual medley (record progression)	4 December	Final	Katinka Hosszú	Hungary	56.67	3	
1500 m freestyle (record progression)	4 December	Final	Gregorio Paltrinieri	Italy	14:08.06	3	

European records
Event	Date	Round	Name	Nationality	Time	Day	References
200 m individual medley	4 December	Final	László Cseh	Hungary	1:51.36	3	
200 m butterfly	6 December	Final	László Cseh	Hungary	1:49.00	5	

Championships records
Event	Date	Round	Name	Nationality	Time	Day	References
200 m backstroke	2 December	Final	Radosław Kawęcki	Poland	1:48.33	1	
100 m individual medley	3 December	Heats	Katinka Hosszú	Hungary	57.52	2	
200 m breaststroke	3 December	Final	Marco Koch	Germany	2:00.53	2	
100 m backstroke	3 December	Final	Katinka Hosszú	Hungary	55.42	2	
100 m individual medley	3 December	Semifinal 2	Katinka Hosszú	Hungary	57.49	2	
50 m butterfly	3 December	Final	Sarah Sjöström	Sweden	24.58	2	
4 × 50 m mixed medley	3 December	Final	Simone Sabbioni; Fabio Scozzoli; Silvia Di Pietro; Erika Ferraioli	Italy	1:38.33	2	
200 m backstroke	4 December	Heats	Katinka Hosszú	Hungary	1:59.95	3	
200 m backstroke	4 December	Final	Katinka Hosszú	Hungary	1:59.84	3	
200 m individual medley	5 December	Final	Katinka Hosszú	Hungary	2:02.53	4	
4 × 50 m mixed freestyle	5 December	Final	Federico Bocchia; Marco Orsi; Silvia Di Pietro; Erika Ferraioli	Italy	1:29.26	4	
100 m butterfly	6 December	Final	Sarah Sjöström	Sweden	55.03	5	
4 × 50 m medley	6 December	Final	Simone Sabbioni; Fabio Scozzoli; Matteo Rivolta; Marco Orsi	Italy	1:31.71	5	

== Results ==
=== Men's events ===
Event	Gold		Silver		Bronze	
50 m freestyle	Evgeny Sedov; Russia	20.87	Marco Orsi; Italy	20.92	Sebastian Szczepanski; Poland	21.21
100 m freestyle	Marco Orsi; Italy	46.05	Pieter Timmers; Belgium	46.61	Sebastian Szczepanski; Poland	46.87
200 m freestyle	Paul Biedermann; Germany	1:42.68	Pieter Timmers; Belgium	1:42.85	Glenn Surgeloose; Belgium; Viacheslav Andrusenko; Russia	1:43.55
400 m freestyle	Péter Bernek; Hungary	3:35.46	Paul Biedermann; Germany	3:35.96	Gabriele Detti; Italy	3:37.22
1500 m freestyle	Gregorio Paltrinieri; Italy	14:08.06; WR	Gabriele Detti; Italy	14:18.00	Henrik Christiansen; Norway	14:23.60
50 m backstroke	Tomasz Polewka; Poland	22.96	Chris Walker-Hebborn; United Kingdom; Simone Sabbioni; Italy	23.09	none awarded	
100 m backstroke	Radosław Kawęcki; Poland	49.64	Stanislav Donets; Russia	50.30	Chris Walker-Hebborn; United Kingdom	50.35
200 m backstroke	Radosław Kawęcki; Poland	1:48.33; CR	Yakov Toumarkin; Israel	1:49.84	Simone Sabbioni; Italy	1:50.75
50 m breaststroke	Damir Dugonjič; Slovenia	26.20	Adam Peaty; United Kingdom	26.21	Oleg Kostin; Russia; Alexander Murphy; Ireland	26.35
100 m breaststroke	Marco Koch; Germany	56.78	Adam Peaty; United Kingdom	56.96	Giedrius Titenis; Lithuania	57.02
200 m breaststroke	Marco Koch; Germany	2:00.53; CR	Dániel Gyurta; Hungary	2:01.99	Andrew Willis; United Kingdom	2:02.76
50 m butterfly	Andriy Hovorov; Ukraine	22.36	Yauhen Tsurkin; Belarus	22.56	Aleksandr Popkov; Russia	22.69
100 m butterfly	László Cseh; Hungary	49.33	Matteo Rivolta; Italy	49.70	Nikita Konovalov; Russia	50.28
200 m butterfly	László Cseh; Hungary	1:49.00; ER	Viktor Bromer; Denmark	1:51.62	Simon Sjödin; Sweden	1:52.89
100 m individual medley	Sergey Fesikov; Russia	52.00	Yakov Toumarkin; Israel	52.62	Andreas Vazaios; Greece	52.67
200 m individual medley	László Cseh; Hungary	1:51.36; ER	Philip Heintz; Germany	1:53.21	Diogo Carvalho; Portugal	1:53.45
400 m individual medley	Dávid Verrasztó; Hungary	4:02.43	Roberto Pavoni; United Kingdom	4:02.69	Gal Nevo; Israel	4:04.68
4 × 50 m freestyle relay	Russia; Evgeny Sedov (20.71); Andrey Arbuzov (20.94); Aleksandr Kliukin (20.93); Nikita Konovalov (20.91)	1:23.49	Italy; Federico Bocchia (21.56); Marco Orsi (20.46); Giuseppe Guttuso (21.20); Filippo Magnini (21.22)	1:24.44	Belarus; Yauhen Tsurkin (21.83); Anton Latkin (21.11); Viktar Staselovich (21.03); Artyom Machekin (21.04)	1:25.01
4 × 50 m medley relay	Italy; Simone Sabbioni (23.29); Fabio Scozzoli (25.88); Matteo Rivolta (22.19); Marco Orsi (20.35)	1:31.71; CR	Russia; Andrei Shabasov (23.46); Oleg Kostin (26.05); Aleksandr Popkov (22.26); Evgeny Sedov (20.40)	1:32.17	Belarus; Pavel Sankovich (23.45); Ilya Shymanovich (26.59); Yauhen Tsurkin (21.99); Anton Latkin (21.18)	1:33.21

Legend: WR - World record; ER - European record; CR - Championship record

=== Women's events ===
Event	Gold		Silver		Bronze	
50 m freestyle	Ranomi Kromowidjojo; Netherlands	23.56	Sarah Sjöström; Sweden	23.63	Jeanette Ottesen; Denmark	23.94
100 m freestyle	Sarah Sjöström; Sweden	51.37	Ranomi Kromowidjojo; Netherlands	51.59	Veronika Popova; Russia	52.02
200 m freestyle	Federica Pellegrini; Italy	1:51.89	Veronika Popova; Russia	1:52.46	Femke Heemskerk; Netherlands	1:52.81
400 m freestyle	Jazmin Carlin; United Kingdom	3:58.81	Katinka Hosszú; Hungary	3:58.84	Boglárka Kapás; Hungary	3:59.02
800 m freestyle	Jazmin Carlin; United Kingdom	8:11.01	Boglárka Kapás; Hungary	8:11.43	Sharon van Rouwendaal; Netherlands	8:15.84
50 m backstroke	Katinka Hosszú; Hungary	26.13	Aleksandra Urbańczyk; Poland	26.27	Sanja Jovanović; Croatia	26.45
100 m backstroke	Katinka Hosszú; Hungary	55.42; CR	Alicja Tchórz; Poland	57.17	Eygló Ósk Gústafsdóttir; Iceland	57.42
200 m backstroke	Katinka Hosszú; Hungary	1:59.84; CR	Daria Ustinova; Russia	2:01.57	Eygló Ósk Gústafsdóttir; Iceland	2:03.53
50 m breaststroke	Jenna Laukkanen; Finland	29.71	Fanny Lecluyse; Belgium	29.84	Natalia Ivaneeva; Russia	29.99
100 m breaststroke	Jenna Laukkanen; Finland	1:04.56	Moniek Nijhuis; Netherlands	1:05.21	Viktoriya Zeynep Gunes; Turkey	1:05.32
200 m breaststroke	Fanny Lecluyse; Belgium	2:18.49	Maria Astashkina; Russia	2:19.69	Viktoriya Zeynep Gunes; Turkey	2:19.73
50 m butterfly	Sarah Sjöström; Sweden	24.58; CR	Jeanette Ottesen; Denmark	25.04	Silvia Di Pietro; Italy	25.26
100 m butterfly	Sarah Sjöström; Sweden	55.03; CR	Jeanette Ottesen; Denmark	55.68	Alexandra Wenk; Germany	56.43
200 m butterfly	Franziska Hentke; Germany	2:03.01	Lara Grangeon; France	2:03.85	Alessia Polieri; Italy	2:04.37
100 m individual medley	Katinka Hosszú; Hungary	56.67; WR	Siobhan-Marie O'Connor; United Kingdom	57.65	Marrit Steenbergen; Netherlands	59.00
200 m individual medley	Katinka Hosszú; Hungary	2:02.53; CR	Siobhan-Marie O'Connor; United Kingdom	2:05.13	Louise Hansson; Sweden	2:07.96
400 m individual medley	Katinka Hosszú; Hungary	4:19.75	Hannah Miley; United Kingdom	4:26.87	Lara Grangeon; France	4:29.14
4 × 50 m freestyle relay	Italy; Silvia Di Pietro (24.03); Erika Ferraioli (23.59); Aglaia Pezzato (24.14); Federica Pellegrini (24.29)	1:36.05	Netherlands; Inge Dekker (24.41); Femke Heemskerk (24.01); Tamara van Vliet (24.52); Ranomi Kromowidjojo (23.26)	1:36.20	Russia; Rozaliya Nasretdinova (24.40); Veronika Popova (23.92); Daria Kartashova (24.19); Nataliya Lovtsova (24.11)	1:36.62
4 × 50 m medley relay	Netherlands; Tessa Vermeulen (27.51); Moniek Nijhuis (29.27); Inge Dekker (25.10); Ranomi Kromowidjojo (22.97)	1:44.85	Sweden; Louise Hansson (27.23); Sophie Hansson (29.82); Sarah Sjöström (24.33); Magdalena Kuras (23.96)	1:45.34	Italy; Elena Gemo (26.95); Martina Carraro (30.06); Silvia Di Pietro (24.98); Erika Ferraioli (23.74)	1:45.73

Legend: WR - World record; ER - European record; CR - Championship record

=== Mixed events ===
Event	Gold		Silver		Bronze	
4 × 50 m mixed freestyle	Italy; Federico Bocchia (21.58); Marco Orsi (20.46); Silvia Di Pietro (23.63); Erika Ferraioli (23.59)	1:29.26; CR	Russia; Evgeny Sedov (21.14); Nikita Konovalov (20.85); Nataliya Lovtsova (23.63); Rozaliya Nasretdinova (23.97)	1:29.59	Netherlands; Jesse Puts (21.74); Ben Schwietert (21.78); Inge Dekker (23.78); Ranomi Kromowidjojo (22.73)	1:30.03
4 × 50 m mixed medley	Italy; Simone Sabbioni (23.50); Fabio Scozzoli (25.99); Silvia Di Pietro (25.24); Erika Ferraioli (23.60)	1:38.33; CR	Russia; Andrei Shabasov (23.52); Andrei Nikolaev (25.69); Alina Kashinskaya (25.47); Rozaliya Nasretdinova (23.68)	1:38.36	Belarus; Pavel Sankovich (23.50); Ilya Shymanovich (26.64); Sviatlana Khakhlova (25.33); Aleksandra Gerasimenya (23.56)	1:39.03

Legend: WR - World record; ER - European record; CR - Championship record

== Medal table ==
* Host nation (Israel)

Rank	Nation	Gold	Silver	Bronze	Total
1	Hungary (HUN)	11	3	1	15
2	Italy (ITA)	7	5	5	17
3	Germany (GER)	4	2	1	7
4	Russia (RUS)	3	7	7	17
5	Poland (POL)	3	2	2	7
5	Sweden (SWE)	3	2	2	7
7	Great Britain (GBR)	2	7	2	11
8	Netherlands (NED)	2	3	4	9
9	Finland (FIN)	2	0	0	2
10	Belgium (BEL)	1	3	1	5
11	Slovenia (SLO)	1	0	0	1
11	Ukraine (UKR)	1	0	0	1
13	Denmark (DEN)	0	3	1	4
14	Israel (ISR)*	0	2	1	3
15	Belarus (BLR)	0	1	3	4
16	France (FRA)	0	1	1	2
17	Iceland (ISL)	0	0	2	2
17	Turkey (TUR)	0	0	2	2
19	Croatia (CRO)	0	0	1	1
19	Greece (GRE)	0	0	1	1
19	Ireland (IRL)	0	0	1	1
19	Lithuania (LTU)	0	0	1	1
19	Norway (NOR)	0	0	1	1
19	Portugal (POR)	0	0	1	1
Totals (24 entries)		40	41	41	122

== Participating nations ==
500 swimmers from 48 nations participated at the competition. The only LEN members did not participate are Gibraltar, Monaco, Montenegro and San Marino.

- Albania (2)
- Andorra (2)
- Armenia (2)
- Austria (19)
- Azerbaijan (3)
- Belarus (13)
- Belgium (11)
- Bosnia and Herzegovina (3)
- Bulgaria (2)
- Croatia (9)
- Cyprus (2)
- Czech Republic (27)
- Denmark (8)
- Estonia (16)
- Faroe Islands (3)
- Finland (22)
- France (13)
- Georgia (2)
- Germany (27)
- Great Britain (12)
- Greece (3)
- Hungary (27)
- Iceland (3)
- Ireland (2)
- Israel (46) (Host country)
- Italy (36)
- Kosovo (2)
- Latvia (3)
- Liechtenstein (1)
- Lithuania (7)
- Luxembourg (6)
- Macedonia (1)
- Malta (2)
- Moldova (3)
- Netherlands (13)
- Norway (8)
- Poland (8)
- Portugal (14)
- Romania (5)
- Russia (38)
- Serbia (7)
- Slovakia (12)
- Slovenia (10)
- Spain (4)
- Sweden (7)
- Switzerland (11)
- Turkey (18)
- Ukraine (5)
