= Ana Kalandadze =

Georgian poet (1924–2008)

- Born: 15 December 1924; Khidistavi, Guria, Georgian SSR, Soviet Union
- Died: 11 March 2008 (aged 83)
- Resting place: Mtatsminda Pantheon
- Education: Tbilisi State University
- Writing career
- Genre: poetry

Ana Kalandadze (Georgian: ანა კალანდაძე; 15 December 1924 – 11 March 2008) was a Georgian poet and one of the most influential female figures in modern Georgian literature.

Kalandadze was born in the village of Khidistavi near Chokhatauri in Georgia's southwest region of Guria. She graduated from the Faculty of Philology at Tbilisi State University in 1946, and published her first poems the same year. Her intricate, subtle rhythms, and personal lyricism garnered much popularity. In the words of Professor Donald Rayfield:

From the 700 or so poems she has now published it is now possible to extract some sort of consistent philosophy, for all the reticence and stoicism. The rare outburst of defiance never amount to more than a couple of lines in a poem and have been subtle enough not to arouse the antagonism of [Soviet] authority.

— Rayfield, p. 274.

Many of Kalandadze's poems on patriotic and romantic themes have been made into popular songs. She was also a prolific translator of Russian and European poetry. Some of her poems include ''თუთა'' (Blackberry) and ''ფოთლები'' (Leaves).

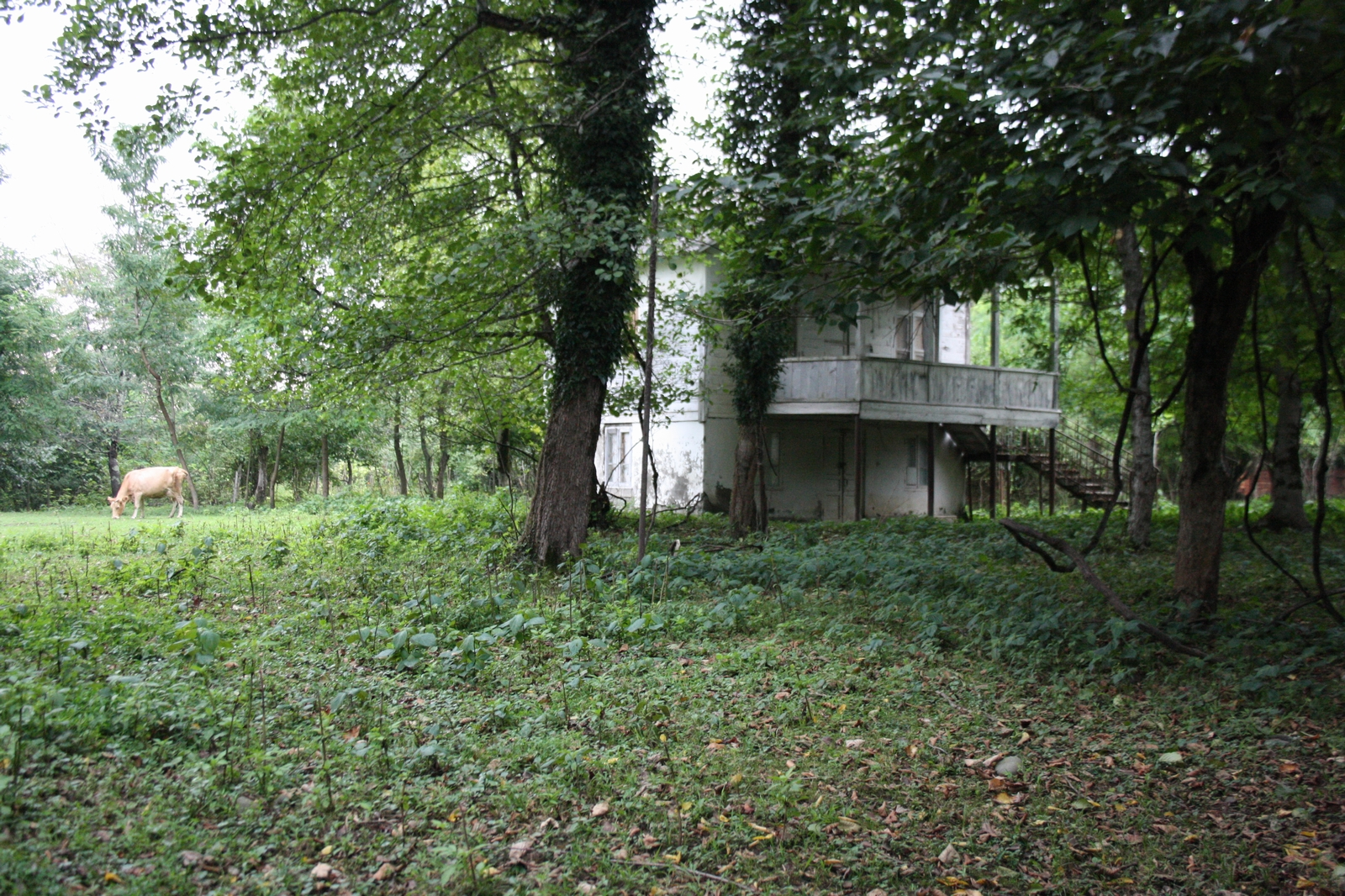
The house of Ana Kalandadze in Khidistavi, Guria, Georgia

Kalandadze sadly passed away with a cerebrovascular incident and was buried at the Mtatsminda Pantheon.
