= Khidistavi =

Khidistavi ხიდისთავი
- Village
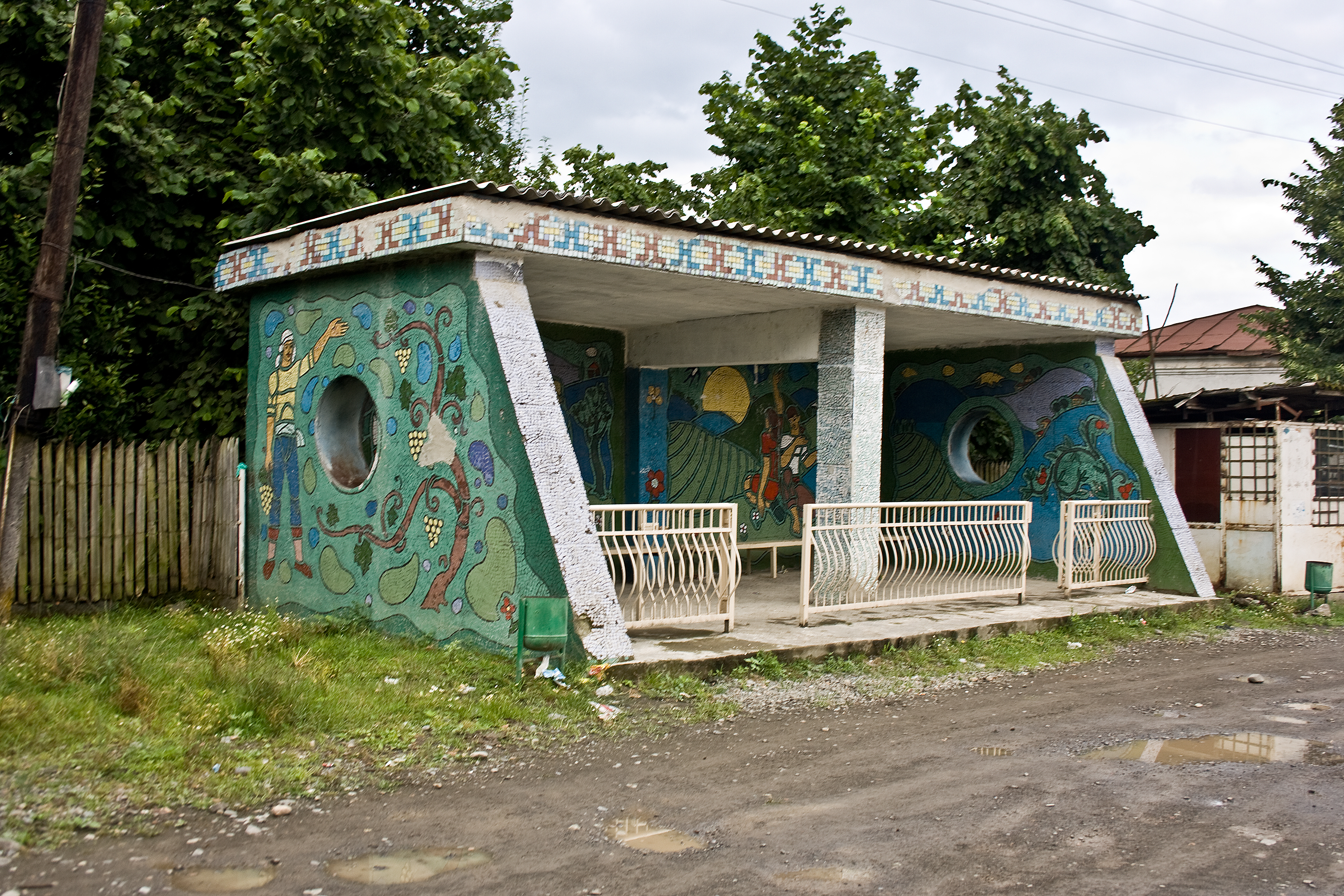
- Bus stop in main square, Khidistavi (2011)

- Location within Georgia
- Coordinates: 41°58′23″N 42°12′40″E
- Country: Georgia
- Region: Guria
- Municipality: Chokhatauri
- Elevation: 231 m (758 ft)

Population (2014)
  - Total: 303
- Time zone: UTC+4 (Georgian Time)

Khidistavi (Georgian: ხიდისთავი) is a village in the Chokhatauri Municipality of Guria in western Georgia.

== See also ==
- Guria
