= Philip Heintz =

German swimmer

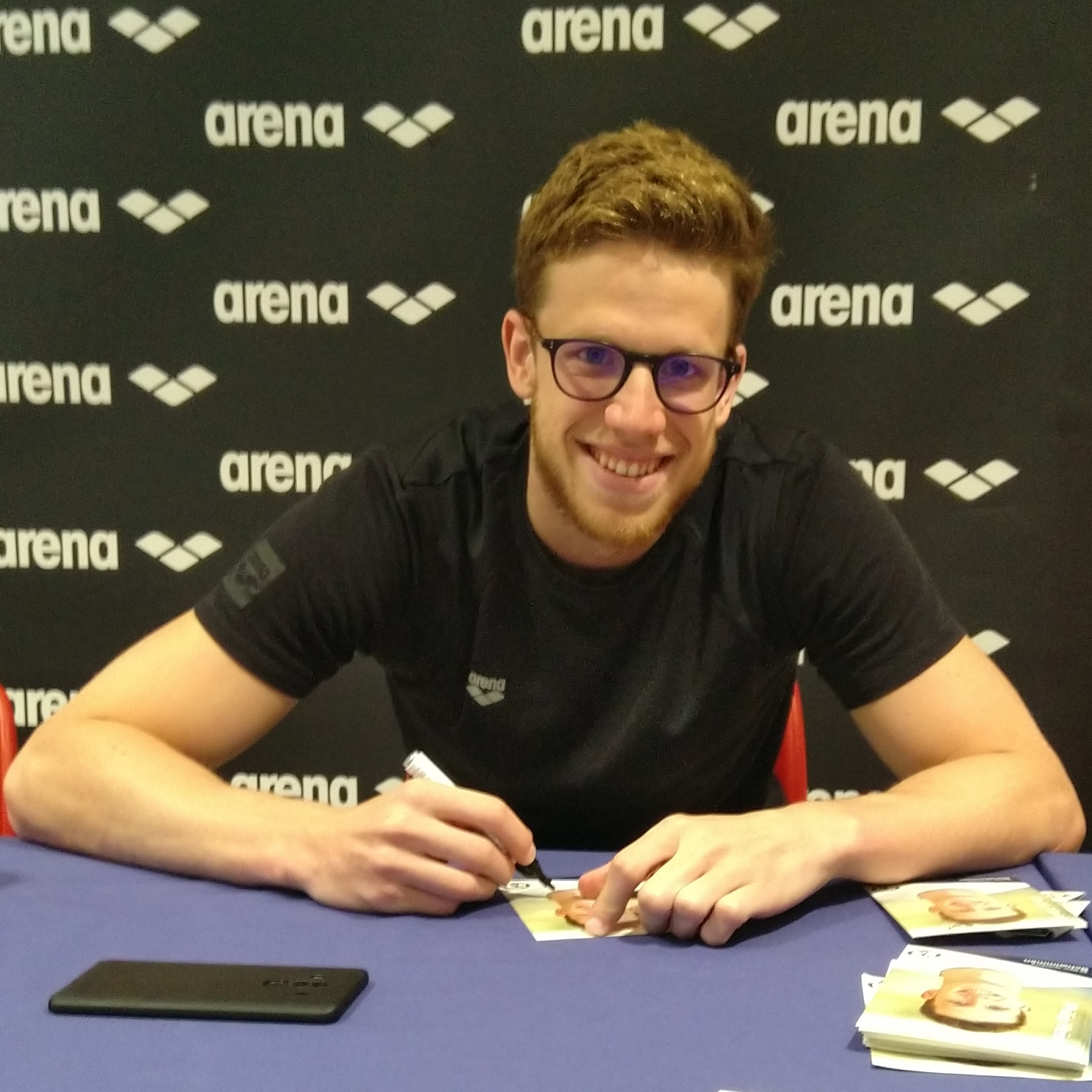
- Heintz in 2018

Personal information
- Born: 21 February 1991 (age 35) Mannheim, Germany
- Height: 1.94 m (6 ft 4 in)
- Weight: 85 kg (187 lb)

Sport
- Sport: Swimming
- Strokes: Medley
- Club: SV Mannheim
Medal record
Men's swimming
Representing Germany
World Championships (SC)
Silver medal – second place	2016 Windsor	200 m medley
European Championships (LC)
Silver medal – second place	2014 Berlin	200 m medley
Silver medal – second place	2018 Glasgow	200 m medley
Bronze medal – third place	2018 Glasgow	4×100 m medley
European Championships (SC)
Gold medal – first place	2013 Herning	200 m medley
Gold medal – first place	2017 Copenhagen	200 m medley
Silver medal – second place	2015 Netanya	200 m medley
Silver medal – second place	2017 Copenhagen	400 m medley
Bronze medal – third place	2019 Glasgow	200 m medley

Philip Heintz (born 21 February 1991) is a German swimmer. He competed in the 200 m individual medley event at the 2012 Summer Olympics and was eliminated after the qualifying heats. At the 2016 Summer Olympics in Rio de Janeiro, he competed in the 200 m individual medley. He finished in 6th place with a time of 1:57.48.
