= Meri Mumladze =

Georgian swimmer

Personal information
- Born: 27 April 2001 (age 25)

Sport
- Sport: Swimming

Meri Mumladze (born 27 April 2001) is a Georgian swimmer. She competed in the women's 100 metre breaststroke event at the 2017 World Aquatics Championships.
