= Eduardo Solaeche =

Spanish swimmer

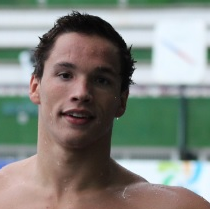

Personal information
- Born: 22 November 1993 (age 32)

Sport
- Sport: Swimming

Eduardo Solaeche (born 22 November 1993) is a Spanish swimmer. He competed in the men's 200 metre individual medley event at the 2016 Summer Olympics.
