= Viktor Bromer =

Danish swimmer (born 1993)

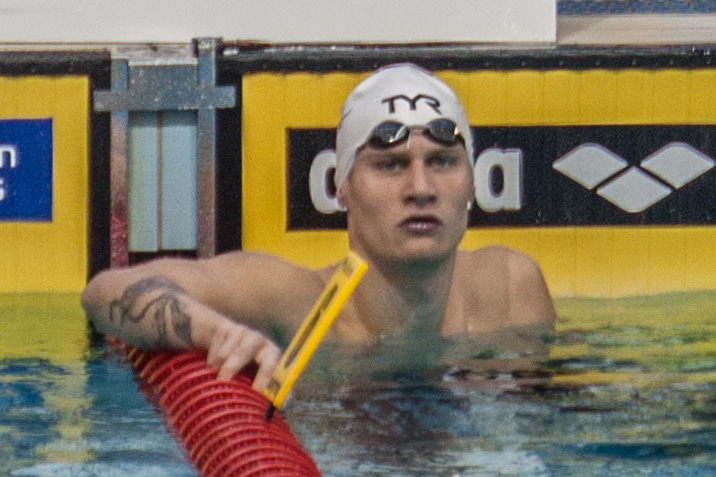
- Bromer at the 2015 European Short Course Swimming Championships, Netanya

Personal information
- Full name: Viktor Bregner Bromer
- Nationality: Denmark
- Born: 20 April 1993 (age 33) Aarhus
- Height: 1.94 m (6 ft 4 in)
- Weight: 87 kg (192 lb)

Sport
- Sport: Swimming
- Strokes: Butterfly
- Club: Aalborg Swimming Club
Medal record
European Championships (LC)
Gold medal – first place	Berlin 2014	200 m butterfly
Silver medal – second place	2016 London	200 m butterfly
European Championships (SC)
Silver medal – second place	2012 Chartres	200 m butterfly
Silver medal – second place	2015 Netanya	200 m butterfly

Viktor Bregner Bromer (born 20 April 1993, in Aarhus) is a Danish swimmer. He won the 200 metre butterfly at the 2014 European Aquatics Championships in 1:55.29, which was a new Danish and Nordic record. He raced in the 2016 Summer Olympics for Denmark, where he did the 200 metre butterfly, finishing 6th. At the 2017 World Championships, he finished 7th. He is sponsored by Speedo.
