= Roberto Pavoni =

British swimmer

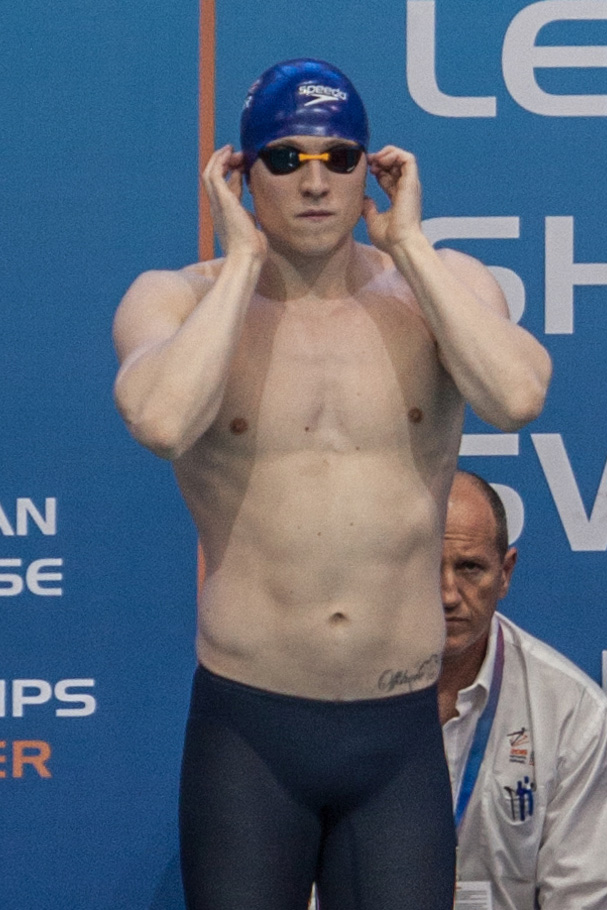
- Pavoni at the 2015 European Short Course Swimming Championships, Netanya

Personal information
- Full name: Roberto Pavoni
- National team: Great Britain
- Born: 22 March 1991 (age 35) Harold Wood, England
- Height: 1.76 m (5 ft 9 in)
- Weight: 71 kg (157 lb)

Sport
- Sport: Swimming
- Strokes: Individual medley
- College team: Loughborough University
Medal record
Men's swimming
Representing Great Britain
European Championships
Silver medal – second place	2014 Berlin	400 m medley
Bronze medal – third place	2014 Berlin	200 m medley
European Championships (SC)
Silver medal – second place	2015 Netanya	400 m medley
European Junior Championships
Gold medal – first place	2009 Prague	400 m medley

Roberto Pavoni (born 22 March 1991) is an English former competitive swimmer who represented Great Britain in various international championships. At the 2012 Summer Olympics in London, he finished 13th overall in the heats in the Men's 400 metre individual medley and failed to reach the final. He also competed in the 200m butterfly, again failing to reach the final.

He competed for England at the 2014 Commonwealth Games, reaching the final of the men's 200 m butterfly, men's 200 m individual medley, men's 400 m individual medley, and he was also part of the English 4 x 200 m freestyle relay team. He retired from competitive swimming in 2017.

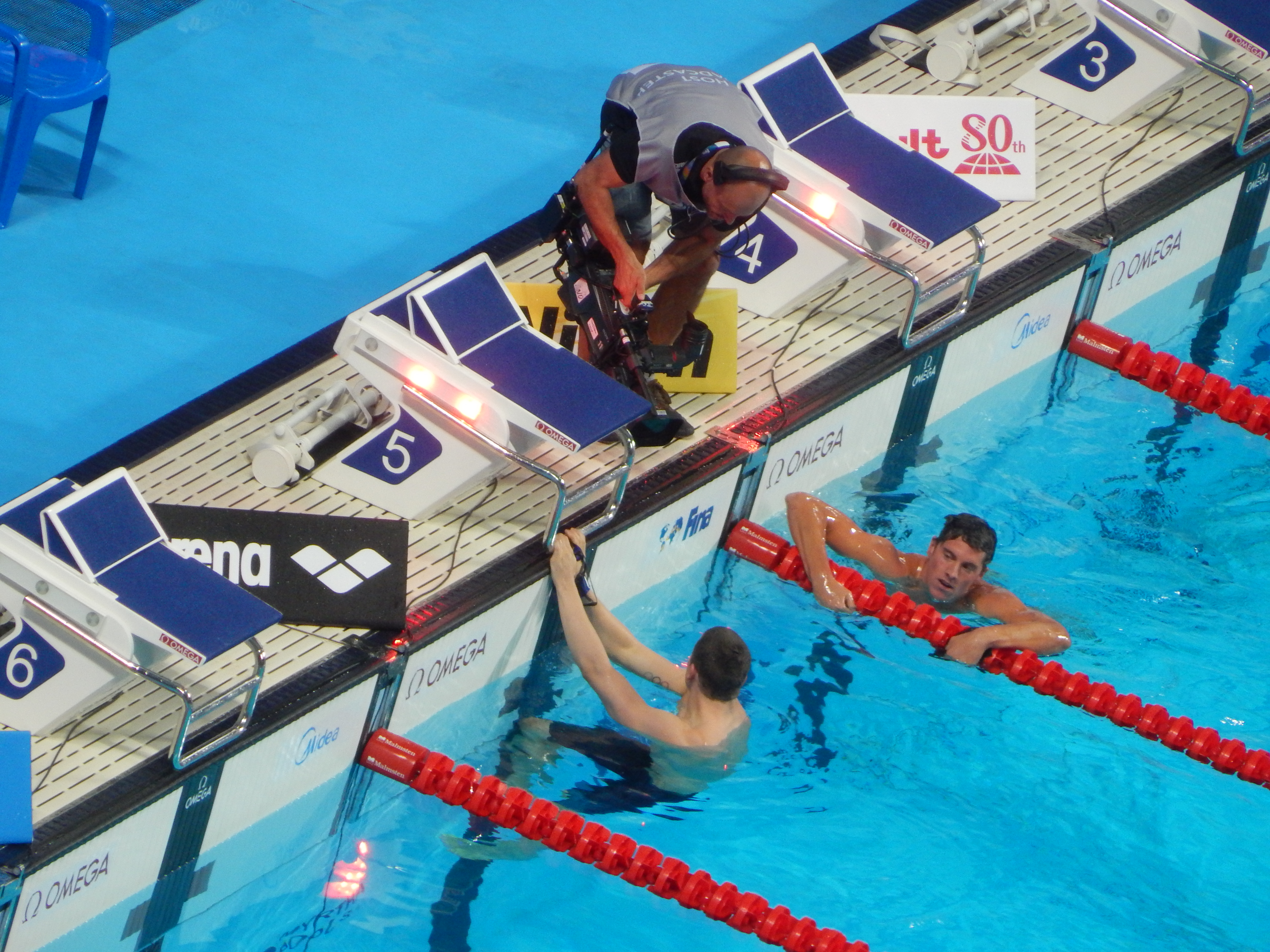
Pavoni and Conor Dwyer after swim-off 200 m medley in Kasan 2015

Pavoni attended St. Helen's Catholic Primary School, in Brentwood, Essex, and learnt to swim in the school's pool and Brentwood swimming club at Brentwood Center.
