= Dávid Verrasztó =

Hungarian swimmer

Dávid Verrasztó OLY
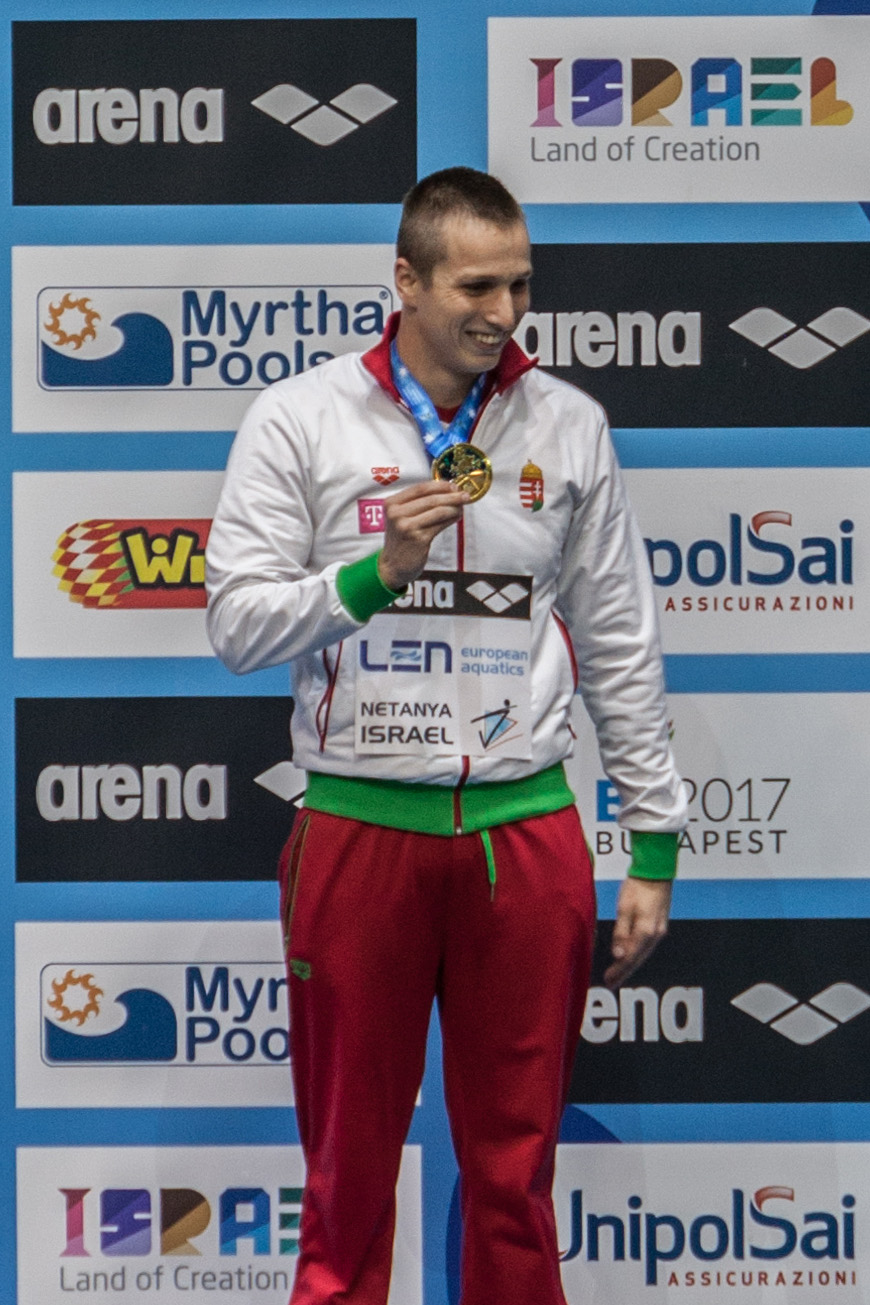
- Verrasztó wearing the gold medal he won at the 400m medley, 2015 European Short Course Swimming Championships, Netanya

Personal information
- National team: Hungary
- Born: 22 August 1988 (age 37) Budapest, Hungary
- Height: 1.80 m (5 ft 11 in)
- Weight: 73 kg (161 lb)

Sport
- Sport: Swimming
- Strokes: Backstroke, Medley
- Club: A Jövő SC ( –2016); BVSC-Zugló (2016–17); Ferencvárosi TC (2017– )
- Coach: Ákos Molnár, Sándor Széles (educator)
Medal record
Men's swimming
Representing Hungary
World Championships (LC)
Silver medal – second place	2015 Kazan	400 m medley
Silver medal – second place	2017 Budapest	400 m medley
World Championships (SC)
Bronze medal – third place	2012 Istanbul	400 m medley
Bronze medal – third place	2014 Doha	400 m medley
Bronze medal – third place	2016 Windsor	400 m medley
European Championships (LC)
Gold medal – first place	2014 Berlin	400 m medley
Gold medal – first place	2016 London	400 m medley
Gold medal – first place	2018 Glasgow	400 m medley
Silver medal – second place	2010 Budapest	400 m medley
Silver medal – second place	2012 Debrecen	400 m medley
Silver medal – second place	2022 Rome	400 m medley
European Championships (SC)
Gold medal – first place	2010 Eindhoven	400 m medley
Gold medal – first place	2013 Herning	400 m medley
Gold medal – first place	2015 Netanya	400 m medley
Silver medal – second place	2009 Istanbul	400 m medley
Silver medal – second place	2011 Szczecin	400 m medley
Silver medal – second place	2012 Chartres	400 m medley

Dávid Verrasztó (born 22 August 1988) is a Hungarian competitive swimmer. He competed at the 2012 and 2016 Summer Olympics, in the 200 and 400 m individual medleys. His father and coach, Zoltán Verrasztó, and his sister, Evelyn Verrasztó, are also swimmers.

In 2019, he was a member of the 2019 International Swimming League, representing Team Iron.
