= Irakli Bolkvadze =

Georgian swimmer (born 1994)

Personal information
- Nicknames: Ika, Bolkva
- Nationality: Georgia
- Born: 12 December 1994 (age 31) Nicosia, Cyprus
- Height: 1.83 m (6 ft 0 in)
- Weight: 73 kg (161 lb)

Sport
- Sport: Swimming
- Strokes: Breaststroke, medley
- Club: Hamilton Aquatics Dubai
- Coach: Georgi Abzianidze; Irina Minjulina; Chris Tidey
Medal record
Men's swimming
Representing Georgia
European Junior Championships
Bronze medal – third place	2012 Antwerp	200 m breaststroke

Irakli Bolkvadze (Georgian: ირაკლი ბოლქვაძე; born December 12, 1994, in Nicosia, Cyprus) is a Georgian swimmer, who specialized in breaststroke and individual medley events. He won a bronze medal in the boys' 200 m breaststroke at the 2012 European Junior Swimming Championships in Antwerp, Belgium with a time of 2:15.46. Bolkvadze is also trained by his personal coach Irina Minjulina.

Bolkvadze qualified for the men's 200 m breaststroke at the 2012 Summer Olympics in London by breaking a new Georgian record and eclipsing a FINA B-standard entry time of 2:16.35 from the European Championships in Debrecen, Hungary. In Georgia's Olympic history, he also became the first ever swimmer to surpass an invitation time set by FINA. He dominated the first heat by two seconds ahead of Kyrgyzstan's Dmitrii Aleksandrov, lowering his Georgian record time to 2:15.86. Bolkvadze failed to advance into the semifinals, as he placed twenty-eighth overall in the preliminary heats.

At the 2013 FINA World Championships in Barcelona, Bolkvadze demolished a new Georgian record of 2:03.55 in the 200 m individual medley, but finished thirty-fifth from the morning prelims. Bolkvadze is currently a member of Hamilton Aquatics Club in Dubai, United Arab Emirates under head coach Chris Tidey.

== Personal bests ==
- 50 m breaststroke – 30.28
- 100 m breaststroke – 1:04.24
- 200 m breaststroke – 2:15.46
- 200 m individual medley – 2:03.55
- 400 m individual medley – 4:29.25
