= Pavel Janeček =

Czech swimmer

Personal information
- Born: April 7, 1994 (age 32)

Sport
- Sport: Swimming
- Strokes: Medley

Pavel Janeček (born 7 April 1994) is a Czech swimmer. He competed at the 2016 Summer Olympics in the men's 400 metre individual medley; his time of 4:22.09 in the heats did not qualify him for the final.
