= Federico Turrini =

Italian swimmer (born 1987)

Personal information
- Born: 21 July 1987 (age 38) Livorno, Italy
Medal record
Men's swimming
Representing Italy
European Championships (LC)
Bronze medal – third place	2014 Berlin	400 m medley
Bronze medal – third place	2016 London	400 m medley
European Championships (SC)
Bronze medal – third place	2010 Eindhoven	400 m medley
Bronze medal – third place	2013 Herning	400 m medley
Mediterranean Games
Gold medal – first place	2013 Mersin	200 m medley
Gold medal – first place	2013 Mersin	4x200 m freestyle
Silver medal – second place	2013 Mersin	200 m backstroke
Silver medal – second place	2013 Mersin	400 m medley

Federico Turrini (born 21 July 1987) is an Italian swimmer who competes in the Men's 400m individual medley. At the 2012 Summer Olympics he finished joint 19th overall in the heats in the Men's 400 metre individual medley and failed to reach the final. At the 2013 Mediterranean Games held in Mersin, Turkey he won the gold medal in 200 individual medley by 1:59:35.
