= Jakub Malý =

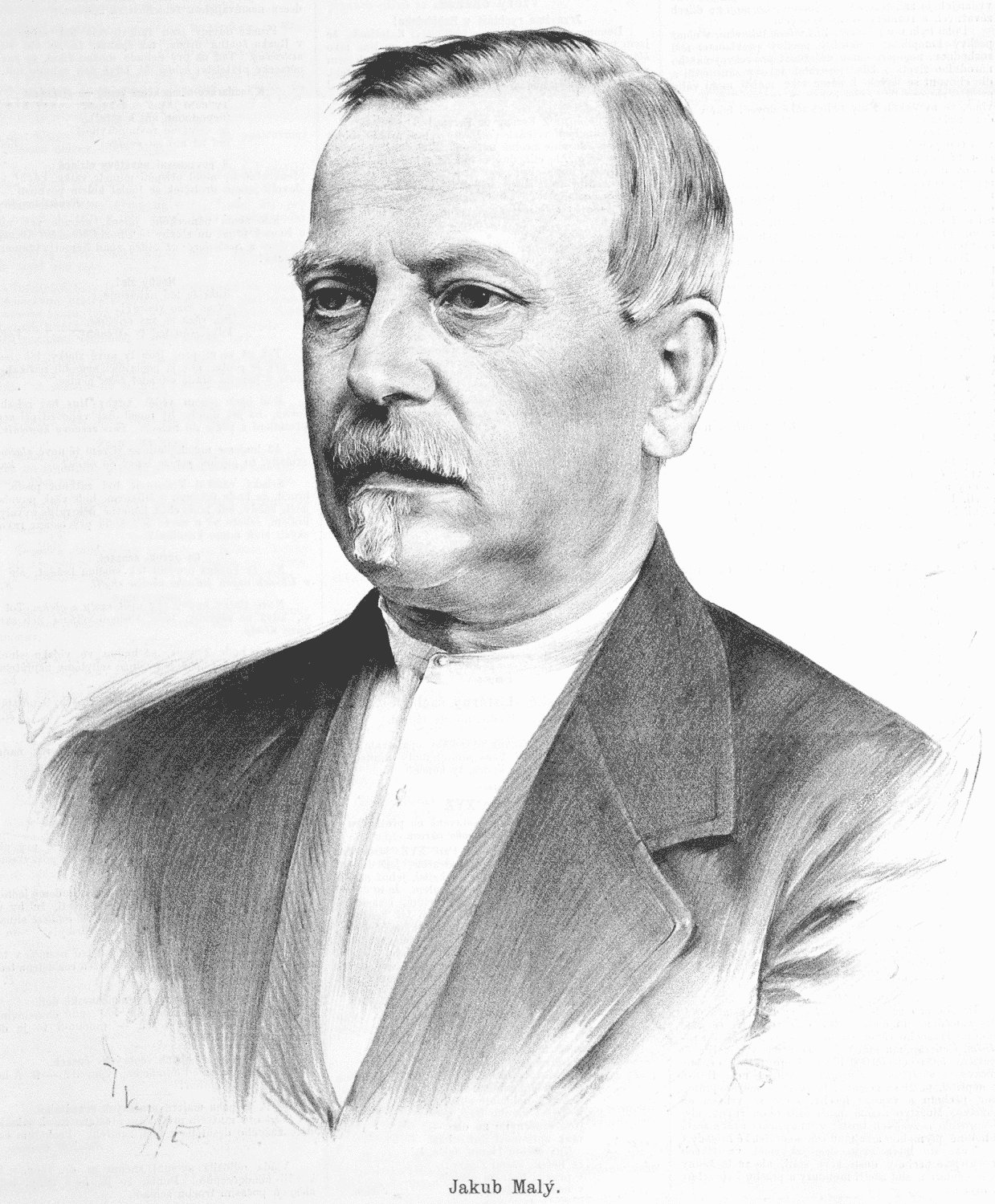
Portrait of Malý by Jan Vilímek

Jakub Josef Dominik Malý (pseudonyms: Budislav, Václav Pravda and K.Z.; 4 August 1811 – 7 March 1885) was a Czech historian, writer and journalist.

== Life and work ==
Malý was born on 4 August 1811 in Prague. The son of a middle-class family, he graduated from the philosophical and law faculties at Charles University. He was influenced by the teachings of Ignaz Cornova, Bernard Bolzano and Josef Jungmann, moved in patriotic and literary circles, and occasionally served as a tutor for noble families.

During the Revolutions of 1848 in the Austrian Empire, he entered politics and became a Conservative member of the National Committee. As a supporter of the Czech National Revival and pan-Slavism, tempered by distrust of the Russians, he emphasized the importance of the Czech language Manuscript of Zelená Hora, supposedly dating from the 8th century, which became a major symbol for the nationalist movement.

During the 1830s, he published articles and opinions in numerous conservative patriotic newspapers, and helped Jungmann to create his German-Czech dictionary. He also wrote poetry and some drama. From 1835 to 1844, he edited the Knihovna Populární Literatury (Library of Popular Literature), which included translations from foreign authors. Toward the end of the 1850s, he was employed by František Ladislav Rieger, as an editor for his Czech national encyclopedia, Slovník naučný.

Among his major works were National Bohemian Tales and Legends (Národní české pohádky a pověsti), History of the Czech Nation for Readers of all Classes (Dějepis národu českého pro čtenáře každého stavu) and Memoirs and Reflections of an Old Patriot (Vzpomínky a úvahy starého vlastence). He also translated eleven plays by Shakespeare and was the first to translate Charles Dickens into Czech.

He died on 7 March 1885 in Prague, at the age of 73.

== Sources ==
- R. Havel: "Malý Jakub". In: Österreichisches Biographisches Lexikon 1815–1950 (ÖBL). Vol. 6, Austrian Academy of Sciences, Vienna 1975, ISBN 3-7001-0128-7, p. 42.
- Constantin von Wurzbach: "Malý, Jacob Joseph." In: Biographisches Lexikon des Kaiserthums Oesterreich (Biographical Lexicon of the Empire of Austria). Part 16 Kaiserlich-königliche Hof- und Staatsdruckerei, Vienna 1867, p. 346–349 (digitalised).
