= Jérémy Desplanches =

Swiss swimmer (born 1994)

Personal information
- Born: 7 August 1994 (age 31) Geneva, Switzerland
- Height: 1.89 m (6 ft 2 in)
- Weight: 72 kg (159 lb)

Sport
- Sport: Swimming
- Strokes: Medley
- Club: Genève Natation 1885
Medal record
Men's swimming
Representing Switzerland
Olympic Games
Bronze medal – third place	2020 Tokyo	200 m medley
World Championships (LC)
Silver medal – second place	2019 Gwangju	200 m medley
European Championships (LC)
Gold medal – first place	2018 Glasgow	200 m medley
Silver medal – second place	2020 Budapest	200 m medley
Military World Games
Bronze medal – third place	2019 Wuhan	200 m medley

Jérémy Marc George Desplanches (born 7 August 1994) is a Swiss breaststroke and medley swimmer.

He competed at the 2015 World Aquatics Championships, at the 2016 Summer Olympics in Rio de Janeiro and was finalist at the 2017 World Aquatics Championships.

He won the men's 200m Individual Medley final at the Glasgow 2018 European Swimming Championships in Glasgow and got silver in men's 200m individual medley at the 18th FINA World Championships in Gwangju. He's the second male swimmer from Switzerland to claim a medal at the FINA World Championships, after Dano Halsall in the men's 50m freestyle in 1986.

He represented Switzerland at the 2020 Summer Olympics and won a bronze medal in the men's 200m individual medley.

== International Swimming League ==
In 2019 Desplanches was member of the 2019 International Swimming League representing Team Iron.

== Personal life ==
Desplanches is married to French swimmer Charlotte Bonnet.
