= Gal Nevo =

Israeli swimmer (born 1987)

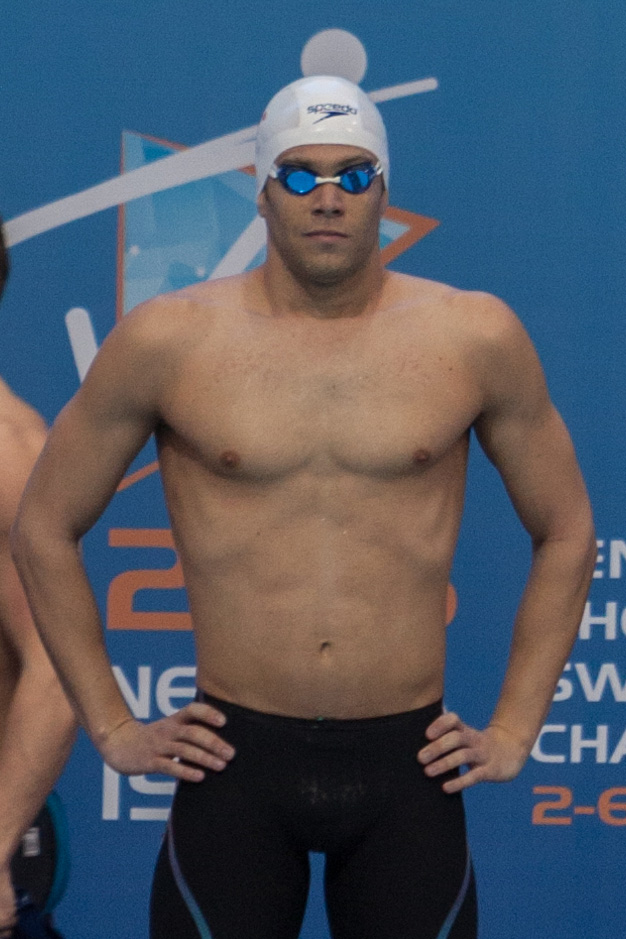

Personal information
- Native name: גל נבו
- Nationality: Israeli
- Born: June 29, 1987 (age 39) Kibbutz Hamadia, Israel
- Height: 1.77 m (5 ft 9 1/2 in)

Sport
- Sport: Swimming
- Strokes: Individual medley
- College team: Arizona State University; Georgia Tech
Medal record
European Championships (LC)
Silver medal – second place	2016 London	200 m medley
Bronze medal – third place	2010 Budapest	400 m medley
European Championships (SC)
Silver medal – second place	2013 Herning	400 m medley
Bronze medal – third place	2009 Istanbul	400 m medley
Bronze medal – third place	2011 Szczecin	200 m medley
Bronze medal – third place	2011 Szczecin	400 m medley
Bronze medal – third place	2012 Chartres	200 m medley
Bronze medal – third place	2012 Chartres	400 m medley
Bronze medal – third place	2015 Netanya	400 m medley
Maccabiah Games
Gold medal – first place	2009 Israel	400 m medley

Gal Nevo (Hebrew: גל נבו; born 29 June 1987) is a record-holding Israeli swimmer.

== Biography ==
Gal Nevo was born in Kibbutz Hamadia in the Beit She'an Valley. When the local swimming pool closed, Nevo would practice at Gan HaShlosha National Park.

== Sports career ==
Nevo holds three Israeli records, in the 200m IM, 400m IM and 200m butterfly. He represented Israel at the 2008 and 2012 Summer Olympics. Nevo competed on behalf of Israel at the 2008 Summer Olympics in Beijing, China. He won a gold medal for Israel in the 2009 Maccabiah Games in the 400 m medley. Nevo also competed on behalf of Israel at the 2012 Summer Olympics in London. Nevo finished 10th in the heats of the 400 meters individual medley, breaking his personal best time. Nevo also swam at the 2016 Summer Olympics.

== See also ==
- Sports in Israel
- List of Israeli records in swimming
