= Alexis Santos =

Portuguese swimmer (born 1992)

Personal information
- Full name: Alexis Manaças da Silva Santos
- Nationality: Portuguese
- Born: 23 March 1992 (age 34) Lisbon, Portugal
- Height: 1.85 m (6 ft 1 in)
- Weight: 75 kg (165 lb)

Sport
- Country: Portugal
- Sport: Swimming
- Club: Sporting CP
Medal record
Men's swimming
Representing Portugal
European Championships (LC)
| Bronze medal – third place | 2016 London | 200m individual medley |
Mediterranean Games
| Bronze medal – third place | 2018 Tarragona | 200 m individual medley |

Alexis Manaças da Silva Santos (born 23 March 1992) is a Portuguese medley swimmer.

He competed at the 2015 World Aquatics Championships and at the 2016 Summer Olympics in Rio de Janeiro. At club level, he represents Sporting CP.
