= Diogo Carvalho =

Portuguese swimmer

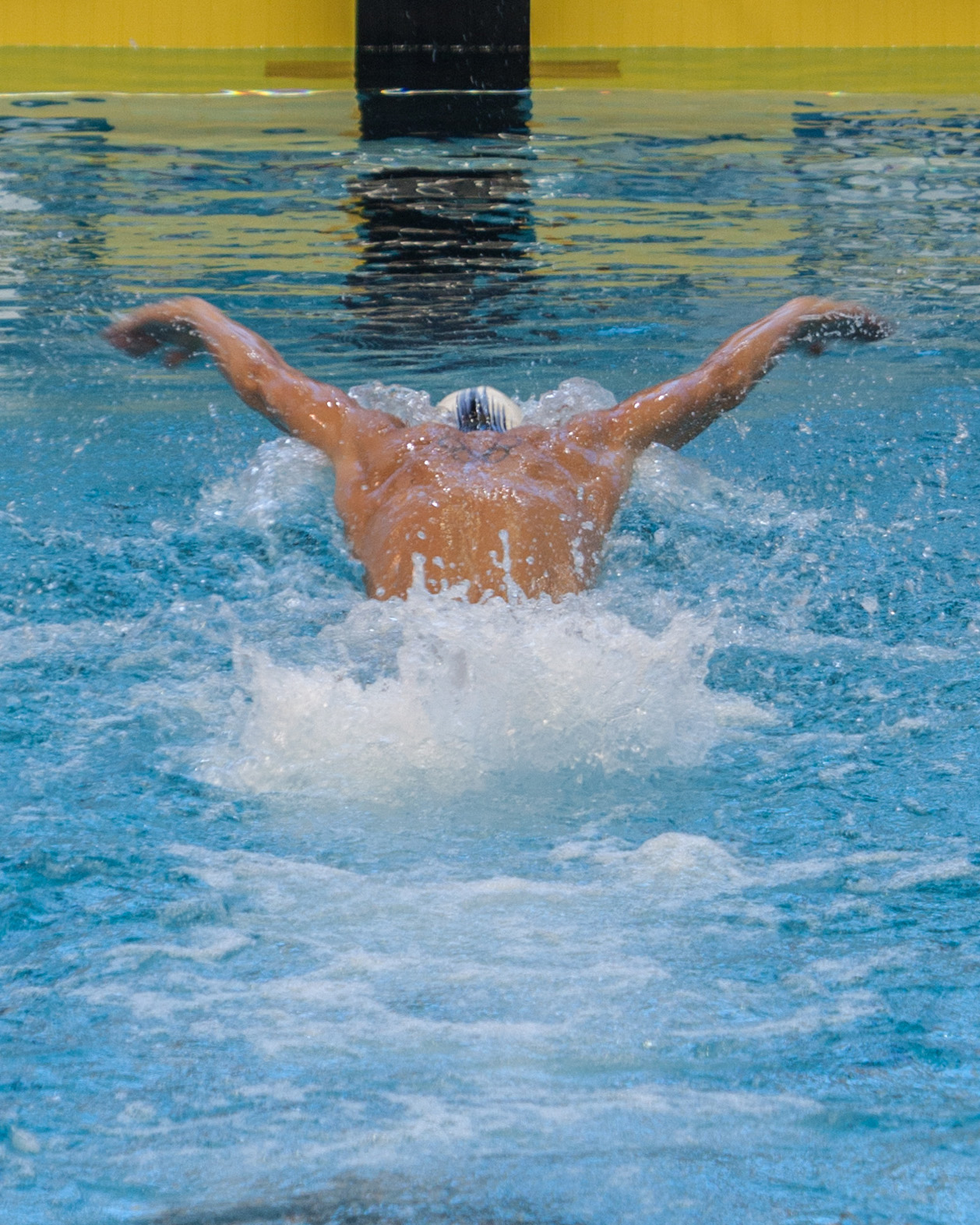
- Netanya 2015

Personal information
- Full name: Diogo Carvalho
- Nationality: Portugal
- Born: 26 March 1988 (age 38) Coimbra, Portugal
- Height: 1.81 m (5 ft 11 in)
- Weight: 72 kg (159 lb)

Sport
- Sport: Swimming
- Strokes: Medley, butterfly
- Club: Clube dos Galitos de Aveiro
Medal record
Men's swimming
Representing Portugal
European Championships (SC)
Bronze medal – third place	2013 Herning	200 m medley
Bronze medal – third place	2015 Netanya	200 m medley

Diogo Carvalho (born 26 March 1988 in Coimbra) is a Portuguese swimmer. He made his Olympic debut at the 2008 Summer Olympics in the 200 metre individual medley. He competed in the 200 and 400 m individual medleys at the 2012 Summer Olympics. He competed in the 200 m individual medley at the 2016 Summer Olympics.

He currently holds 9 individual national records, 6 short course (200 m freestyle, 50, 100 and 200 metres butterfly and 200 and 400 metres medleys) and 2 long course (100 fly and the 200 m medley). His swimming club is Clube dos Galitos de Aveiro in Aveiro. He studies medicine at the University of Coimbra.

== Personal bests ==
Short course

Distance	Freestyle	Backstroke	Breaststroke	Butterfly	Individual medley
50 m	23.42	25.35	28.85	23.63	–
100 m	48.51	54.94	59.62	51.45	53.28
200 m	1:45.69	1:58.76	2:15.23	1:53.39	1:54.58
400 m	3:50.45	–	–	–	4:06.83
800 m		–	–	–	–
1500 m		–	–	–	–

Long course

Distance	Freestyle	Backstroke	Breaststroke	Butterfly	Individual medley
50 m	23.40	27.68	29.05	24.13	–
100 m	50.32	1:00.83	1:03:38	52.42	–
200 m	1:51.05	2:11.15	2:15.87	1:56.71	1:59.39
400 m	3:57.47	–	–	–	4:18.08
800 m		–	–	–	–
1500 m		–	–	–	–

== Results ==
=== 200m Individual Medley ===
Year	Competition	Result		
Year	Competition	Heats	Semi-Finals	Finals
2011	FINA World Aquatics Championships	9th 1:59.51	12th 1:59.80	-
2010	LEN European Aquatics Championships	13th 2:01.77	13th 2:01.89	-
2010	European Short Course Swimming Championships	7th 1:57.25	/	6th 1:56.83
2010	FINA World Swimming Championships (25 m)	11th 1:55.87	-	-
2009	FINA World Aquatics Championships	17th 2:00.05	-	-
2009	European Short Course Swimming Championships	5th 1:54.97	/	8th 1:54.58
2008	LEN European Aquatics Championships	4th 2:00.40	5th 2:01.49	6th 2:02.29
2008	European Short Course Swimming Championships	1st 1:55.98	/	5th 1:55.95
2008	FINA World Swimming Championships (25 m)	8th 1:57.88	/	7th 1:57.67
