= Swimming at the 2024 Summer Olympics – Men's 200-metre individual medley =

Men's 200 metre individual medley at the Games of the XXXIII Olympiad
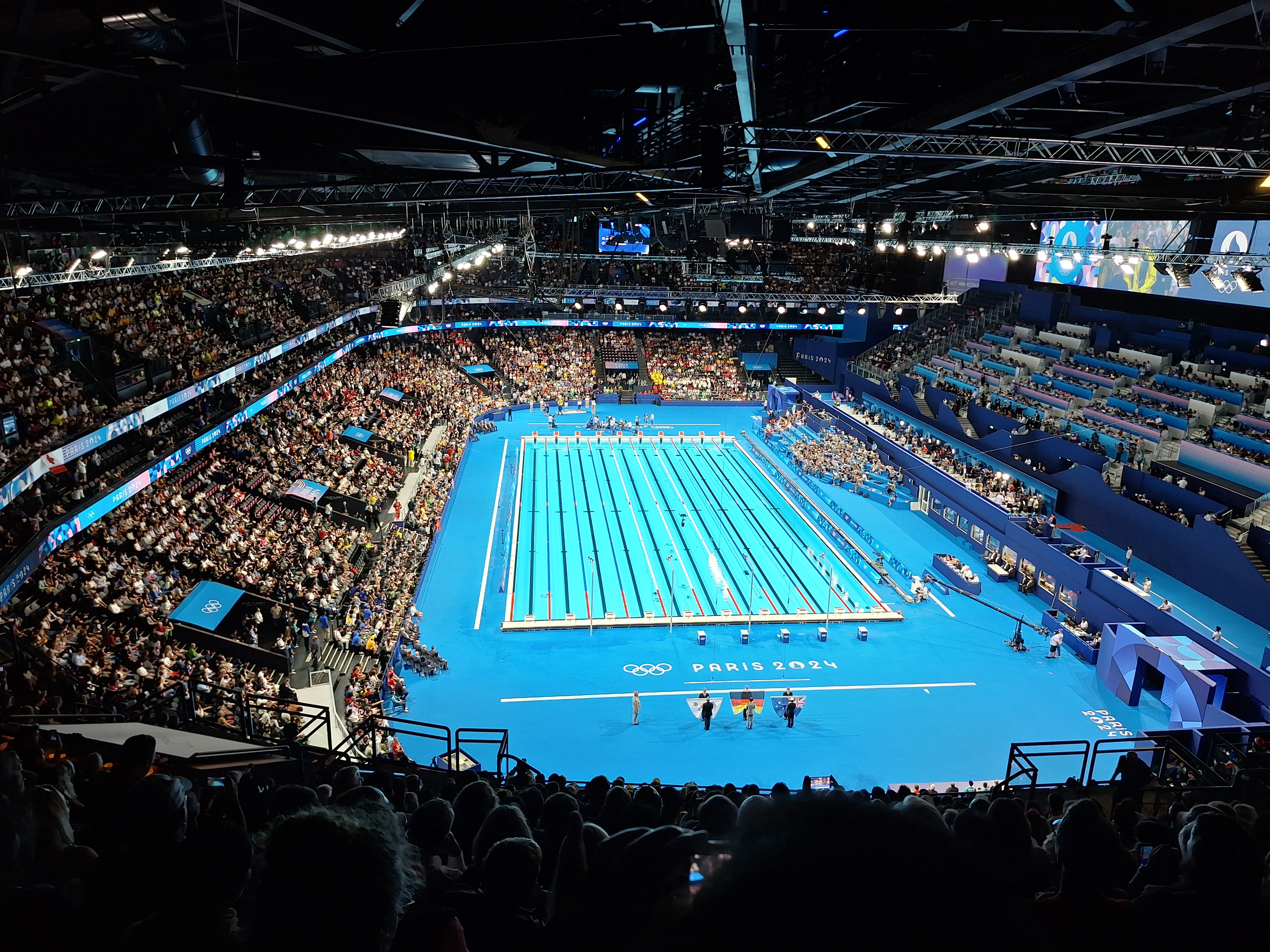
- Paris La Défense Arena after it was converted to a swimming pool for the swimming events
- Venue: Paris La Défense Arena
- Dates: 1 August 2024 (Heats and Semis); 2 August 2024 (Final)
- Competitors: 25 from 22 nations
- Winning time: 1:54.06 OR

Medalists
1st place, gold medalist(s)		Léon Marchand	France
2nd place, silver medalist(s)		Duncan Scott	Great Britain
3rd place, bronze medalist(s)		Wang Shun	China

The men's 200 metre individual medley event at the 2024 Summer Olympics was held from 1 to 2 August 2024 at Paris La Défense Arena, which was converted to a swimming pool for the swimming events.

France's Léon Marchand and China's Wang Shun were the considered the most likely to win gold and silver, respectively. Other medal contenders included the US' Carson Foster and Shaine Casas, Great Britain's Duncan Scott and Tom Dean, and Canada's Finlay Knox. All except Casas qualified for the final.

In the final, Wang was ahead at 50 metres, but Marchand overtook him and stayed ahead to claim gold with a new Olympic and European record of 1:54.06. Scott defended his silver medal from the previous Olympics with 1:55.31, whilst Wang won bronze with 1:56.00. The win gave Marchand his fourth gold medal of the games and Wang's third consecutive Olympic medal in the event.

== Background ==
China's Wang Shun was the defending Olympic champion in the event, and he had the fastest qualifying time of 1:54.62, which he swam to win the event at the 2022 Asian Games. France's Léon Marchand had the second fastest qualifying time of 1:54.82, which he swam to win the event at the 2023 World Championships. Marchand also won the event at the 2022 World Championships. The US' Carson Foster recorded the third fastest qualifying time of 1:55.65 at the US Olympic Trials, where fellow American Shaine Casas also qualified with the fourth fastest time of 1:55.83. Other medal contenders were Duncan Scott and Tom Dean of Great Britain who won silver and bronze at the previous Olympics, respectively, and also won silver and bronze at the 2023 World Championships. Canada's Finlay Knox won the event at the 2024 World Championships. (Note: Several top swimmers chose not to attend the 2024 World Championships to focus on their Olympic training regime.) Both SwimSwam and Swimming World predicted Marchand would win and Wang would take second. SwimSwam predicted Scott would come third, while Swimming World predicted Foster would take third.

Prior to the event, the world record was 1:54.00, set by Ryan Lochte of the United States in 2011. The Olympic record was 1:54.23, set by the USA's Michael Phelps in 2008.

The event was held at Paris La Défense Arena, which was converted to a swimming pool for the swimming events.

== Qualification ==
Each National Olympic Committee (NOC) was permitted to enter a maximum of two qualified athletes in each individual event, but only if both of them had attained the Olympic Qualifying Time (OQT). For this event, the OQT was 1:57.94. World Aquatics then considered athletes qualifying through universality; NOCs were given one event entry for each gender, which could be used by any athlete regardless of qualification time, providing the spaces had not already been taken by athletes from that nation who had achieved the OQT. Finally, the rest of the spaces were filled by athletes who had met the Olympic Consideration Time (OCT), which was 1:58.53 for this event. In total, 16 athletes qualified through achieving the OQT, seven athletes qualified through universality places and two athletes qualified through achieving the OCT.

Top 10 fastest qualification times
Swimmer	Country	Time	Competition
Wang Shun	China	1:54.62	2022 Asian Games
Léon Marchand	France	1:54.82	2023 World Aquatics Championships
Carson Foster	United States	1:55.65	2024 United States Olympic Trials
Shaine Casas	United States	1:55.83	2024 United States Olympic Trials
Duncan Scott	Great Britain	1:55.91	2024 Aquatics GB Swimming Championships
Finlay Knox	Canada	1:56.07	2024 Canadian Olympic Trials
Tom Dean	Great Britain	1:56.07	2023 World Aquatics Championships
Alberto Razzetti	Italy	1:56.21	2024 Italian Championships
Hugo González	Spain	1:56.48	2024 Spanish Summer Open Championships
Daiya Seto	Japan	1:56.62	2023 Japanese Championships

== Heats ==
Four heats (preliminary rounds) took place on 1 August 2024, starting at 11:47. (Note: All times are Central European Summer Time (UTC+2)) The swimmers with the best 16 times in the heats advanced to the semifinals. Japan's Daiya Seto qualified with the fastest time of 1:57.48, Scott qualified second with 1:57.77 and Marchand qualified third with 1:57.86. Wang, Dean, Casas, Foster and Knox, among others, also all qualified. For the first Olympics since London 2012, swimming under 2 minutes was not required to qualify.

Results
Rank	Heat	Lane	Swimmer	Nation	Time	Notes
1	4	6	Daiya Seto	Japan	1:57.48	Q
2	3	5	Duncan Scott	Great Britain	1:57.77	Q
3	3	4	Léon Marchand	France	1:57.86	Q
4	3	3	Alberto Razzetti	Italy	1:58.00	Q
5	4	5	Shaine Casas	United States	1:58.04	Q
6	4	4	Wang Shun	China	1:58.09	Q
7	3	6	Ron Polonsky	Israel	1:58.30	Q
7	4	3	Tom Dean	Great Britain	1:58.30	Q
9	3	7	Jérémy Desplanches	Switzerland	1:58.46	Q
10	2	4	Carson Foster	United States	1:58.63	Q
11	2	6	Lewis Clareburt	New Zealand	1:58.84	Q
11	3	2	William Petric	Australia	1:58.84	Q
13	2	5	Finlay Knox	Canada	1:58.97	Q
14	4	2	Thomas Neill	Australia	1:59.13	Q
15	4	1	Jaouad Syoud	Algeria	1:59.41	Q
16	3	1	Apostolos Papastamos	Greece	2:00.79	Q
17	2	7	Berke Saka	Turkey	2:01.99	
18	2	1	Erick Gordillo	Guatemala	2:02.24	
19	4	8	Tomás Peribonio	Ecuador	2:03.40	
20	1	4	Matheo Mateos	Paraguay	2:03.45	
21	2	2	Matthew Sates	South Africa	2:04.01	
22	1	3	Simon Bachmann	Seychelles	2:06.48	
23	1	5	Esteban Núñez Del Prado	Bolivia	2:08.10	
	2	3	Hugo González	Spain	DNS	
	4	7	Gábor Zombori	Hungary	DNS	

== Semifinals ==
Two semifinals took place on 1 August, starting at 21:47. The swimmers with the best eight times in the semifinals advanced to the final. Foster won the first semifinal with the second fastest time of 1:56.37, and Marchand won the second semifinal to qualify with the fastest time of 1:56.31. Scott, Wang, Seto, Dean, Knox and Italy's Alberto Razzetti made up the rest of the spots in the final. Casas led the second semifinal at 50 metres but finished fourth and did not qualify.

Results
Rank	Heat	Lane	Swimmer	Nation	Time	Notes
1	2	5	Léon Marchand	France	1:56.31	Q
2	1	2	Carson Foster	United States	1:56.37	Q
3	1	4	Duncan Scott	Great Britain	1:56.49	Q
4	1	3	Wang Shun	China	1:56.54	Q
5	2	4	Daiya Seto	Japan	1:56.59	Q
6	1	6	Tom Dean	Great Britain	1:56.92	Q
7	1	5	Alberto Razzetti	Italy	1:57.10	Q
8	2	1	Finlay Knox	Canada	1:57.76	Q
9	2	3	Shaine Casas	United States	1:57.82	
10	1	7	William Petric	Australia	1:58.13	
11	1	1	Thomas Neill	Australia	1:58.77	
12	2	6	Ron Polonsky	Israel	1:58.89	
13	2	2	Jérémy Desplanches	Switzerland	1:58.93	
14	2	7	Lewis Clareburt	New Zealand	2:00.06	
15	2	8	Jaouad Syoud	Algeria	2:00.13	
16	1	8	Apostolos Papastamos	Greece	2:01.02	

== Final ==
The final took place at 20:45 on 2 August. France's president Emmanuel Macron attended in support of Marchand, and the International Olympic Committee, BBC Sport and The Guardian all noted that the crowd strongly supported Marchand. Track and field events in the Olympic athletics arena were delayed due to the crowd at that venue cheering for Marchand.

Wang swam the fastest fly split of the field, reaching the 50 metre mark ahead of Marchand in second. At 100 metres Marchand had taken the lead, which he extended over the breaststroke section of the race (100–150 m) and maintained over the freestyle section (150–200 m) to win gold with a new Olympic and European record of 1:54.06. During the breaststroke leg, Wang was also overtaken by Scott, who maintained the second position to win the silver medal with 1:55.31. Wang won bronze with 1:56.00, ahead of Foster, who finished fourth with 1:56.10.

Marchand's time of 1:54.06 was the second fastest swim ever in this event, 0.06 seconds behind Ryan Lochte's world record set in 2011. The win gave Marchand his fourth gold medal of the games, having already won the 400 metre individual medley, the 200 metre butterfly and the 200 metre breaststroke events. He was the fourth swimmer in history to win four individual gold medals at a single Olympics, along with Michael Phelps, Mark Spitz and Kristin Otto. Scott defended his silver from the previous Olympics and Wang's bronze was his third medal in this event at the Olympics.

Results
Rank	Lane	Swimmer	Nation	Time	Notes
1st place, gold medalist(s)	4	Léon Marchand	France	1:54.06	OR, ER
2nd place, silver medalist(s)	3	Duncan Scott	Great Britain	1:55.31	
3rd place, bronze medalist(s)	6	Wang Shun	China	1:56.00	
4	5	Carson Foster	United States	1:56.10	
5	7	Tom Dean	Great Britain	1:56.46	
6	1	Alberto Razzetti	Italy	1:56.82	
7	2	Daiya Seto	Japan	1:57.21	
8	8	Finlay Knox	Canada	1:57.26	

Statistics
Name	50 metre split	100 metre split	150 metre split	Time	Stroke rate (strokes/min)
Léon Marchand	0:24.72	0:53.55	1:25.91	1:54.06	45.4
Duncan Scott	0:25.05	0:54.44	1:27.64	1:55.31	47.1
Wang Shun	0:24.65	0:53.75	1:27.78	1:56.00	42.8
Carson Foster	0:25.01	0:54.20	1:28.27	1:56.10	44.0
Tom Dean	0:24.96	0:54.50	1:28.42	1:56.46	43.5
Alberto Razzetti	0:25.00	0:55.17	1:28.90	1:56.82	46.2
Daiya Seto	0:24.85	0:54.65	1:28.28	1:57.21	48.4
Finlay Knox	0:24.74	0:54.46	1:29.46	1:57.26	45.0
