= Swimming at the 2022 Asian Games – Men's 400 metre individual medley =

Men's 400 metre individual medley at the 2022 Asian Games
- Venue: Hangzhou Olympic Expo Aquatics Center
- Date: 26 September 2023
- Competitors: 21 from 15 nations

Medalists
gold medal	Tomoru Honda	Japan
silver medal	Daiya Seto	Japan
bronze medal	Wang Shun	China

The men's 400 metre individual medley event at the 2022 Asian Games took place on 26 September 2023 at the Hangzhou Olympic Expo Center.

== Schedule ==
All times are China Standard Time (UTC+08:00)

Date	Time	Event
Tuesday, 26 September 2023	10:14	Heats
Tuesday, 26 September 2023	19:36	Final

== Records ==
Prior to this competition, the existing world, Asian and Games records were as follows.

World Record	Léon Marchand (FRA)	4:02.50	Fukuoka, Japan	23 July 2023
Asian Record	Kosuke Hagino (JPN)	4:06.05	Rio de Janeiro, Brazil	6 August 2016
Games Record	Kosuke Hagino (JPN)	4:07.75	Incheon, South Korea	24 September 2014

== Results ==
Legend

- DSQ — Disqualified

=== Heats ===
Rank	Heat	Athlete	Time	Notes
1	2	Tomoru Honda (JPN)	4:16.60	
2	3	Daiya Seto (JPN)	4:19.69	
3	3	Wang Shun (CHN)	4:20.68	
4	3	Tao Guannan (CHN)	4:20.79	
5	2	Kim Min-suk (KOR)	4:22.61	
6	3	Nguyễn Quang Thuấn (VIE)	4:22.79	
7	3	Trần Hưng Nguyên (VIE)	4:22.97	
8	2	Wang Hsing-hao (TPE)	4:23.70	
9	2	Peter Whittington (HKG)	4:26.74	
10	3	Tan Khai Xin (MAS)	4:27.48	
11	3	Egor Petryakov (UZB)	4:27.87	
12	2	Munzer Kabbara (LBN)	4:28.82	
13	3	Dulyawat Kaewsriyong (THA)	4:32.50	
14	3	Zackery Tay (SGP)	4:37.43	
15	2	Ryan Cheung (HKG)	4:38.24	
16	2	Hamza Shalan (QAT)	4:57.99	
17	1	Muhammad Amaan Siddiqui (PAK)	5:01.12	
18	1	Düürenbayaryn Törmönkh (MGL)	5:06.19	
19	1	Mohamed Rihan Shiham (MDV)	5:14.03	
20	1	Azhar Abbas (PAK)	5:24.77	
—	1	Tögsmandakhyn Mönkh-Undraga (MGL)	DSQ	

=== Final ===
Rank	Athlete	Time	Notes
1st place, gold medalist(s)	Tomoru Honda (JPN)	4:11.40	
2nd place, silver medalist(s)	Daiya Seto (JPN)	4:12.88	
3rd place, bronze medalist(s)	Wang Shun (CHN)	4:15.12	
4	Tao Guannan (CHN)	4:18.40	
5	Kim Min-suk (KOR)	4:18.54	
6	Wang Hsing-hao (TPE)	4:18.68	
7	Nguyễn Quang Thuấn (VIE)	4:19.52	
8	Trần Hưng Nguyên (VIE)	4:26.44	
