= Swimming at the 2020 Summer Olympics – Men's 200 metre individual medley =

Men's 200 metre individual medley at the Games of the XXXII Olympiad
- Venue: Tokyo Aquatics Centre
- Dates: 28 July 2021 (heats); 29 July 2021 (semifinals); 30 July 2021 (final)
- Competitors: 45 from 33 nations
- Winning time: 1:55.00 AS

Medalists
1st place, gold medalist(s)		Wang Shun	China
2nd place, silver medalist(s)		Duncan Scott	Great Britain
3rd place, bronze medalist(s)		Jérémy Desplanches	Switzerland

The men's 200 metre individual medley event at the 2020 Summer Olympics was held from 28 to 30 July 2021 at the Tokyo Aquatics Centre. It was the event's twelfth appearance, having been first held in 1968 and 1972 and then at every edition since 1984.

== Summary ==
During the final held on 30 July 2021, China's defending bronze medallist Wang Shun won Asia's first title in the event. Initially leading after the halfway mark, Wang was overtaken by USA's Michael Andrew after the breaststroke leg. At the final freestyle leg, Wang overtook Andrew to touch first in an Asian record of 1:55.00. With the performance, Wang became the third fastest performer in the event behind the famed U.S. duo of Ryan Lochte and Michael Phelps.

Great Britain's Duncan Scott similarly charged home in the freestyle leg but could not catch Wang, settling for his second silver at these Games in 1:55.28. Fourth after the breaststroke leg, Switzerland's Jérémy Desplanches (1:56.17) edged out the home favourite Daiya Seto (1:56.22) on the home straight by 5-hundredths of a second for bronze. Meanwhile, after failing to make the final in the longer medley event days earlier, the reigning World champion Seto again fell short of the podium, taking fourth.

Coming into the Olympics as the fastest swimmer in the world in 2021 by 0.76 seconds, the U.S.' Michael Andrew used his typical "fly-and-die" strategy to establish a one second lead on the field at the 150 m mark. However, Andrew faded dramatically over the freestyle lap, splitting 30.69 to finish fifth in 1:57.31 - two seconds behind his personal best time from trials. Japan's defending silver medallist Kosuke Hagino (1:57.40) could not repeat his podium finish from five years earlier, taking sixth in his last Olympics performance. Though Hungarian legend László Cseh (1:57.68) was second after the butterfly leg, he was soon overtaken by the field to finish in seventh. With this event being his only one at these Games, Cseh announced his retirement from competitive swimming after the race. New Zealand's Lewis Clareburt (1:57.70), finalist in the longer medley event days earlier, rounded out the championship field.

Notably, the U.S.' 4-time defending champion Michael Phelps did not contest the event following his retirement in 2016.

== Records ==
Prior to this competition, the existing world and Olympic records were as follows.

World record	Ryan Lochte (USA)	1:54.00	Shanghai, China	28 July 2011
Olympic record	Michael Phelps (USA)	1:54.23	Beijing, China	15 August 2008

== Qualification ==
The Olympic Qualifying Time for the event is 1:59.67. Up to two swimmers per National Olympic Committee (NOC) can automatically qualify by swimming that time at an approved qualification event. The Olympic Selection Time is 2:03.26. Up to one swimmer per NOC meeting that time is eligible for selection, allocated by world ranking until the maximum quota for all swimming events is reached. NOCs without a male swimmer qualified in any event can also use their universality place.

== Competition format ==
The competition consists of three rounds: heats, semifinals, and a final. The swimmers with the best 16 times in the heats advance to the semifinals. The swimmers with the best 8 times in the semifinals advance to the final. Swim-offs are used as necessary to break ties for advancement to the next round.

== Schedule ==
All times are Japan Standard Time (UTC+9)

Date	Time	Round
28 July 2021	19:54	Heats
29 July 2021	12:08	Semifinals
30 July 2021	11:16	Final

== Results ==
=== Heats ===
The swimmers with the top 16 times, regardless of heat, advanced to the semifinals.

Rank	Heat	Lane	Swimmer	Nation	Time	Notes
1	6	4	Michael Andrew	United States	1:56.40	Q
2	6	3	Jérémy Desplanches	Switzerland	1:56.89	Q
3	6	1	Lewis Clareburt	New Zealand	1:57.27	Q, NR
4	5	3	Chase Kalisz	United States	1:57.38	Q
5	6	2	Kosuke Hagino	Japan	1:57.39	Q
5	6	5	Duncan Scott	Great Britain	1:57.39	Q
7	5	5	Wang Shun	China	1:57.42	Q
8	5	6	Alberto Razzetti	Italy	1:57.46	Q
9	4	4	Mitch Larkin	Australia	1:57.50	Q
10	4	7	László Cseh	Hungary	1:57.51	Q
11	4	5	Hugo González	Spain	1:57.61	Q
12	3	7	Tomoe Zenimoto Hvas	Norway	1:57.64	Q, NR
13	4	3	Philip Heintz	Germany	1:57.72	Q
14	5	2	Andrey Zhilkin	ROC	1:57.94	Q
15	4	2	Matthew Sates	South Africa	1:58.08	Q
16	5	4	Daiya Seto	Japan	1:58.15	Q
17	4	1	Finlay Knox	Canada	1:58.29	
18	5	1	Léon Marchand	France	1:58.30	
19	6	7	Caio Pumputis	Brazil	1:58.36	
20	6	6	Hubert Kós	Hungary	1:58.47	
21	4	8	Gabriel Lopes	Portugal	1:58.56	
22	3	4	Brendon Smith	Australia	1:58.57	
23	3	6	Jacob Heidtmann	Germany	1:58.80	
24	5	8	Andreas Vazaios	Greece	1:58.84	
25	2	5	Vinicius Lanza	Brazil	1:58.92	
26	4	6	Qin Haiyang	China	1:58.95	
26	3	1	Ron Polonsky	Israel	1:58.95	
28	6	8	Alexis Santos	Portugal	1:59.32	
29	3	5	Maxim Stupin	ROC	1:59.39	
30	2	1	Arjan Knipping	Netherlands	1:59.44	NR
30	2	4	Gal Cohen Groumi	Israel	1:59.44	
32	3	8	Bernhard Reitshammer	Austria	1:59.56	
33	3	3	Danas Rapšys	Lithuania	1:59.90	
34	5	7	Joe Litchfield	Great Britain	2:00.11	
35	2	6	Apostolos Papastamos	Greece	2:00.38	
36	2	7	Tomas Peribonio	Ecuador	2:00.62	
37	3	2	Wang Hsing-hao	Chinese Taipei	2:00.72	
38	2	2	José Ángel Martínez	Mexico	2:01.34	
39	2	8	Jarod Arroyo	Puerto Rico	2:01.92	
40	1	3	Tyler Christianson	Panama	2:02.70	NR
41	1	6	Munzer Kabbara	Lebanon	2:03.08	NR
42	2	3	Raphaël Stacchiotti	Luxembourg	2:03.17	
43	1	4	Keanan Dols	Jamaica	2:04.29	
44	1	5	Christoph Meier	Liechtenstein	2:04.34	
45	1	2	Tasi Limtiaco	Federated States of Micronesia	2:07.69	

=== Semifinals ===
The swimmers with the best 8 times, regardless of heat, advanced to the final.

Rank	Heat	Lane	Swimmer	Nation	Time	Notes
1	2	6	Wang Shun	China	1:56.22	Q
2	1	3	Duncan Scott	Great Britain	1:56.69	Q
3	1	8	Daiya Seto	Japan	1:56.86	Q
4	2	4	Michael Andrew	United States	1:57.08	Q
5	1	4	Jérémy Desplanches	Switzerland	1:57.38	Q
6	2	3	Kosuke Hagino	Japan	1:57.47	Q
7	2	5	Lewis Clareburt	New Zealand	1:57.55	Q
8	1	2	László Cseh	Hungary	1:57.64	Q
9	1	6	Alberto Razzetti	Italy	1:57.70	
10	2	2	Mitch Larkin	Australia	1:57.80	
11	2	7	Hugo González	Spain	1:57.96	
12	1	5	Chase Kalisz	United States	1:58.03	
13	2	1	Philip Heintz	Germany	1:58.13	
14	2	8	Matthew Sates	South Africa	1:58.75	
15	1	1	Andrey Zhilkin	ROC	1:59.05	
16	1	7	Tomoe Zenimoto Hvas	Norway	2:00.21	

=== Final ===
Rank	Lane	Name	Nation	Time	Notes
1st place, gold medalist(s)	4	Wang Shun	China	1:55.00	AS
2nd place, silver medalist(s)	5	Duncan Scott	Great Britain	1:55.28	NR
3rd place, bronze medalist(s)	2	Jérémy Desplanches	Switzerland	1:56.17	NR
4	3	Daiya Seto	Japan	1:56.22	
5	6	Michael Andrew	United States	1:57.31	
6	7	Kosuke Hagino	Japan	1:57.49	
7	8	László Cseh	Hungary	1:57.68	
8	1	Lewis Clareburt	New Zealand	1:57.70	
