= Yang Sansheng =

Chinese swimmer

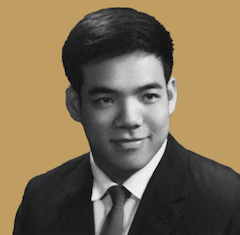

Personal information
- Full name: 楊三生; Yang Sansheng
- Nickname: Sansheng
- National team: China
- Born: Jiexi, Guangdong, China

Sport
- Sport: Swimming
- Strokes: Backstroke
Medal record
All China Games
Silver medal – second place	1959 Beijing	100m backstroke
Silver medal – second place	1959 Beijing	200m backstroke
Silver medal – second place	1965 Beijing	100m backstroke
Silver medal – second place	1965 Beijing	200m backstroke
Gold medal – first place	1965 Beijing	4×100m medley relays
Chinese National Swimming Championships
Gold medal – first place	1960 Chengdu	100m backstroke
Gold medal – first place	1960 Chengdu	200m backstroke
Bronze medal – third place	1960 Chengdu	4×100m medley relays
Gold medal – first place	1962 Nanning	100m backstroke
Gold medal – first place	1962 Nanning	200m backstroke
Gold medal – first place	1962 Nanning	4×100m medley relays
Other National Games
Gold medal – first place	1961 China's National Swimming Division Championship	100m backstroke
Gold medal – first place	1961 China’s National Top Swimmers Competition	4×100m medley relays
Gold medal – first place	1963 Beijing Best Swimmers Exhibition Game	200m backstroke
Gold medal – first place	1963 First Games of the New Emerging Forces Trial	100m backstroke
Gold medal – first place	1963 First Games of the New Emerging Forces Trial	200m backstroke
Gold medal – first place	1963 China’s National Best Swimmer Game	100m backstroke
Silver medal – second place	1963 China’s National Best Swimmer Game	200m backstroke
World Championship
Gold medal – first place	1961 China-Czech Swimmer Friendly Game	100m backstroke
Gold medal – first place	1961 China-Czech Swimmer Friendly Game	4×100m medley relays
Gold medal – first place	1963 First Games of the New Emerging Forces (Jakarta, Indonesia)	100m backstroke
Silver medal – second place	1963 First Games of the New Emerging Forces (Jakarta, Indonesia)	200m backstroke
Gold medal – first place	1963 First Games of the New Emerging Forces (Jakarta, Indonesia)	4×100m medley relays
Gold medal – first place	1964 Championship of the New Emerging Forces (Jakarta, Indonesia)	100m backstroke
Gold medal – first place	1964 Championship of the New Emerging Forces (Jakarta, Indonesia)	200m backstroke
Gold medal – first place	1964 Championship of the New Emerging Forces (Jakarta, Indonesia)	4×100m medley relays

Yang Sansheng
- Traditional Chinese: 楊三生
- Simplified Chinese: 杨三生
Transcriptions
Standard Mandarin
- Hanyu Pinyin: Yáng Sānshēng

Yang Sansheng (simplified Chinese: 杨三生; traditional Chinese: 楊三生; born in October 1941) is a retired Chinese swimmer.

Yang was active in the national and international swimming games in 1950s and 1960s, specializing in backstrokes. He broke the national record of the male's 100m backstroke, which had been held by Wu Chuanyu for eight years. Yang was also the national champion and record holder of 100m and 200m backstroke. He earned many medals and trophies for China in various international competitions. In the First Games of the New Emerging Forces, Yang won three championships for China.

In 1969, Yang was invited to serve as coach for Chinese National Swimming Team. He served successively as deputy and then head coach, mentoring Chinese athletes in international competitions.

== Early life ==
Yang Sansheng was born in a small village in Guangdong, China, where he enjoyed having fun in rivers and ponds when he was little. In 1956 when he was 15 years old, Yang won the first prize of 100m freestyle swimming competition in his hometown. This championship showcased his potential in competitive swimming and also encouraged him to become the swimming champion. In 1956, Yang was admitted into the swimming program offered by the local amateur sports school. In 1958, Yang was the top 6 in China's provincial swimming championship and then won the national student aquatic championship. In October 1958, Yang was recruited into the Guangdong Provincial Swimming Team for a professional swimming career.

== Swimming career ==
In 1959, Yang won the champion of men's backstroke of Guangdong Provincial Swimming Championship with a record of 1′10″9, and was selected to Chinese National Swimming Team later in December. Afterwards, Yang focused on the 100m and 200m backstroke, actively performed in various national and international competitions, and remained as the national record holder for a long time. On October 23, 1962, Yang broke the record of 1′8″4 in 100m backstroke held by Wu Chuanyu for eight years, with a new record of 1′5″8 in the Chinese National Swimming Championships (Nanning). This champion brought Yang a well-known reputation after wide coverage by numerous national media. In 1963, Yang won the champion of 100m backstroke and another gold medal of 4 × 100 m medley relays with other team members in the First Games of New Emerging Forces in Jakarta, Indonesia.

== Coaching experience ==
Yang integrated practices with theories. In July 1962, he published a paper “On Backstroke Technique” (《淺談仰泳技術》) about backstroke in a Chinese Magazine “Sports”, resulted in a revolutionary improvement of the backstroke skills in China. Later in 1969, Yang became coach for Chinese National Swimming Team. In 1973, Yang visited Yugoslavia for a friendly tournament as deputy coach of the Chinese National Team of Swimming and Diving. Later, as coach of the Chinese National Swimming Team, he attended the 7th Asian Games in 1974 and Beijing International Swimming and Diving Invitational in 1975. In February 1984, Yang attended as head of Chinese National Swimming Team to 13th National Olympic Committee International Swimming Festival in Berlin, Germany. In April 1984, Yan Hong, an apprentice of Yang, won champions of several events in the 2nd Asian Swimming Championship in South Korea.

== Major achievements ==
Year	Games	Events	Time	Place	Note
1959	First National Games of the People's Republic of China (Beijing)	100m backstroke	1′11″5	6th	
1959	First National Games of the People's Republic of China (Beijing)	4 × 100 m medley relays	4′28″2	2nd	
1959	Guangdong Provincial Autumn Swimming and Diving Championship	100m backstroke	1′10″9	1st	
1959	Guangdong Provincial Autumn Swimming and Diving Championship	200m backstroke	2′37″2	1st	
1959	Guangdong Provincial Autumn Swimming and Diving Championship	4 × 100 m medley relays	4′34″3	1st	
1960	China's National Best Athletes Spring Swimming and Diving Championship	100m backstroke	1′9″8	6th	
1960	China's National Best Athletes Spring Swimming and Diving Championship	200m backstroke	2′35″5	3rd	
1960	Chinese National Swimming Championships (Chengdu)	100m backstroke	1′8″	1st	
1960	Chinese National Swimming Championships (Chengdu)	200m backstroke	2′29″5	1st	New national record
1960	Chinese National Swimming Championships (Chengdu)	4 × 100 m medley relays		3rd	
1960	China-Czech Swimmer Friendly Game	100m backstroke	1′8″8	1st	
1960	China-Czech Swimmer Friendly Game	4 × 100 m medley relays	4′19″9	1st	New national record
1961	China's National Swimming Division Championship (Beijing Division)	100m backstroke	1′7″9	1st	
1961	China's National Top Swimmers Competition	4 × 100 m medley relays	4′17″3	1st	New national record
1962	Chinese National Swimming Championships (Nanning)	100m backstroke	1′5″8	1st	New national record
1962	Chinese National Swimming Championships (Nanning)	200m backstroke	2′30″2	1st	
1962	Chinese National Swimming Championships (Nanning)	4 × 100 m medley relays	4′15″5	1st	New national record
1963	Beijing Best Swimmers Exhibition Game	200m backstroke	2′28″8	1st	New national record
1963	First Games of the New Emerging Forces Trial (Beijing)	100m backstroke	1′5″7	1st	New national record
1963	First Games of the New Emerging Forces Trial (Beijing)	200m backstroke	2′27″	1st	New national record
1963	First Games of the New Emerging Forces (Jakarta, Indonesia)	100m backstroke	1′7″4	1st	
1963	First Games of the New Emerging Forces (Jakarta, Indonesia)	200m backstroke	2′30″8	2nd	
1963	First Games of the New Emerging Forces (Jakarta, Indonesia)	4 × 100 m medley relays	4′15″6	1st	
1963	China's National Best Athletes Swimming Game	100m backstroke		1st	
1963	China's National Best Athletes Swimming Game	200m backstroke		2nd	
1964	Labor Day Swimming Exhibition Game(Beijing)	100m backstroke	1′4″7		New national record
1964	Labor Day Swimming Exhibition Game(Beijing)	200m backstroke	2′26″9		New national record
1964	Championship of the New Emerging Forces (Jakarta, Indonesia)	100m backstroke	1′5″8	1st	New national record
1964	Championship of the New Emerging Forces (Jakarta, Indonesia)	200m backstroke	2′27″5	1st	New record
1964	Championship of the New Emerging Forces (Jakarta, Indonesia)	4 × 100 m medley relays		1st	
1964	Third Guangdong Provincial Sports Game	100m backstroke	1′7″5	1st	
1964	Third Guangdong Provincial Sports Game	200m backstroke	2′29″2	1st	
1965	Second National Games of the People's Republic of China (Beijing)	100m backstroke		2nd	
1965	Second National Games of the People's Republic of China (Beijing)	200m backstroke		2nd	
1965	Second National Games of the People's Republic of China (Beijing)	4 × 100 m medley relays	4′13″	1st	New national record

== Personal best ==
Event	Time	Venue	Date	Note(s)
100 m backstroke	1′4″7	Beijing	May 1964	National record
200 m backstroke	2′26″4	Beijing	27 March 1965	National record
4×100 m backstroke	4′13″	Beijing	September 1965	National record

In the 100m backstroke, Yang broke the record held by Wu Chuanyu in 1962, and then renewed his own record twice in the following two years.

For the 200m backstroke, Yang broke the national record, which had been kept for three years, and then renewed his own record four times in the following five years.

Apart from his personal performance, Yang also made achievements in the event of 4 × 100 m medley relays. From 1960 to 1965, Yang, as well as his team members, broke the national records four times in various competitions.

In addition to national records, Yang also beat the record of 200m backstroke, and renewed his own personal best of 100m backstroke in Championship of the New Emerging Forces in Jakarta, Indonesia, in 1964.

== Others ==
On October 23, 1962, Yang broke the national records of men's 100m backstroke held by Wu Chunyu, attracting attention from many media in China. The media reported that this record completed the goal set by Chairman Mao, who was a fan of swimming and once requested athletes to “learn from Mr. Wu and outperform Mr. Wu”.

Later on, Yang brought back the champions of 100m backstroke and 4 × 100 m medley relays from the First Games of the New Emerging Forces (Jakarta, Indonesia), spreading his reputation around China. Many media reported: with his morale and faith, Yang became the grand master of backstroke in China.

In June 2014, China's People's Publishing House published a book “Yang Sansheng, A Legendary Swimmer” 《楊三生：一個人的泳壇傳奇》 telling the life experiences and reflections of Yang.
