= Wang Shun =

Chinese swimmer (born 1994)

Wang Shun 汪顺
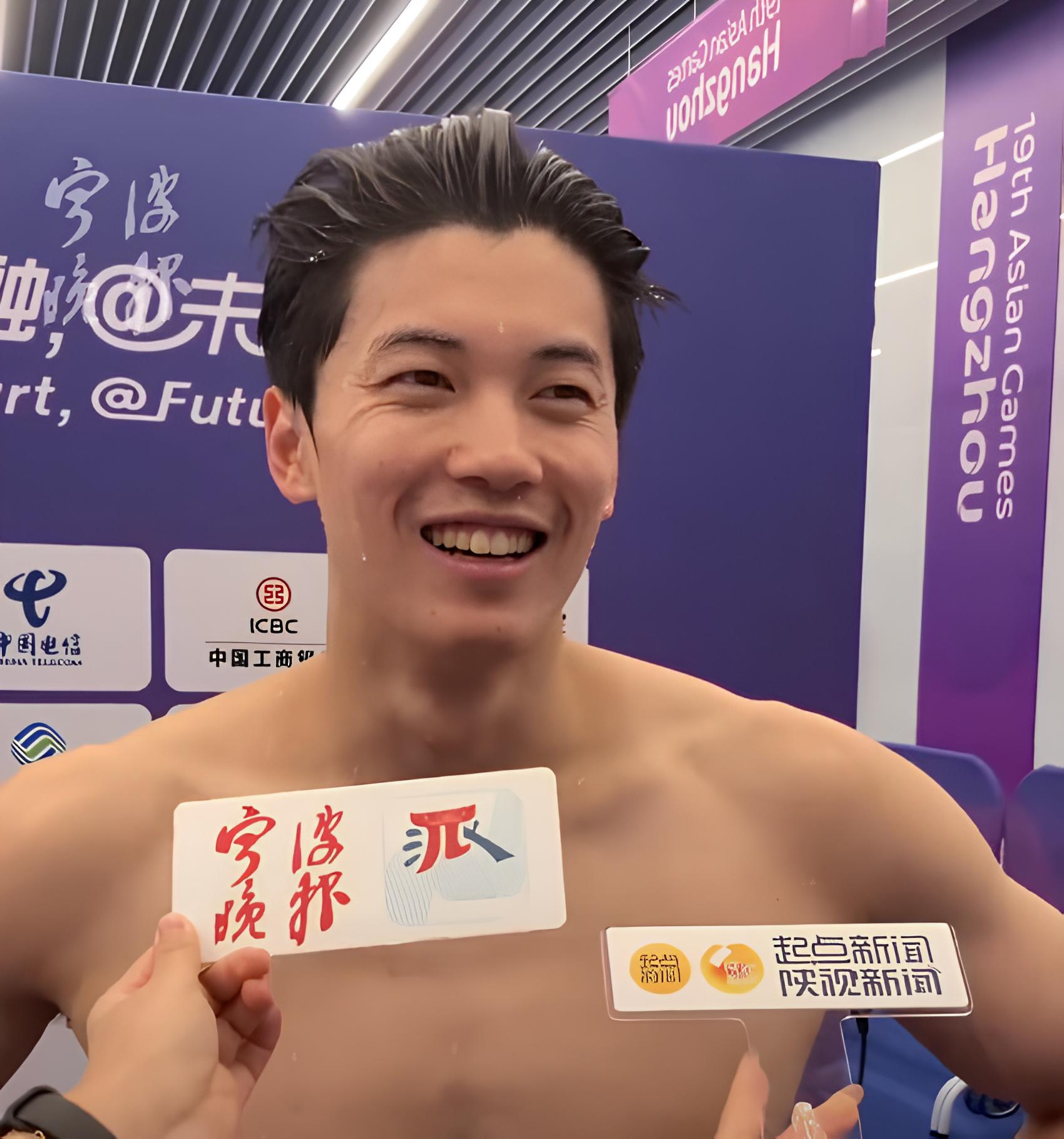
- Wang at the 19th Asian Games Hangzhou in September 2023

Personal information
- Full name: Wang Shun
- National team: China
- Born: 11 February 1994 (age 32) Ningbo, Zhejiang, China
- Height: 1.91 m (6 ft 3 in)
- Weight: 74 kg (163 lb)

Sport
- Sport: Swimming
- Strokes: Individual medley; Freestyle
- Club: Zhejiang
- Coach: Zhu Zhigen
Medal record
Men's swimming
Representing China
Event	1st	2nd	3rd
Olympic Games	1	0	2
World Championships (LC)	0	1	4
World Championships (SC)	2	0	1
Asian Games	6	3	5
Asian Swimming Championships	4	3	0
Military World Games	3	1	1
Total	16	8	13
Olympic Games
Gold medal – first place	2020 Tokyo	200 m medley
Bronze medal – third place	2016 Rio de Janeiro	200 m medley
Bronze medal – third place	2024 Paris	200 m medley
World Championships (LC)
Silver medal – second place	2025 Singapore	4×200 m freestyle
Bronze medal – third place	2011 Shanghai	4×200 m freestyle
Bronze medal – third place	2013 Barcelona	4×200 m freestyle
Bronze medal – third place	2015 Kazan	200 m medley
Bronze medal – third place	2017 Budapest	200 m medley
World Championships (SC)
Gold medal – first place	2016 Windsor	200 m medley
Gold medal – first place	2018 Hangzhou	200 m medley
Bronze medal – third place	2018 Hangzhou	4×200 m freestyle
Asian Games
Gold medal – first place	2018 Jakarta-Palembang	200 m medley
Gold medal – first place	2022 Hangzhou	200 m medley
Gold medal – first place	2022 Hangzhou	4x100 m medley
Gold medal – first place	2022 Hangzhou	4x100 m mixed medley
Gold medal – first place	2022 Hangzhou	4x100 m freestyle
Gold medal – first place	2026 Aichi–Nagoya	4×200 m freestyle
Silver medal – second place	2010 Guangzhou	200 m medley
Silver medal – second place	2018 Jakarta-Palembang	4×200 m freestyle
Silver medal – second place	2022 Hangzhou	4×200 m freestyle
Bronze medal – third place	2014 Incheon	200 m medley
Bronze medal – third place	2018 Jakarta	400 m medley
Bronze medal – third place	2022 Hangzhou	400 m medley
Bronze medal – third place	2026 Aichi-Nagoya	200 m medley
Bronze medal – third place	2026 Aichi-Nagoya	400 m medley
Asian Championships
Gold medal – first place	2012 Dubai	200 m medley
Gold medal – first place	2012 Dubai	400 m medley
Gold medal – first place	2012 Dubai	4×200 m freestyle
Gold medal – first place	2016 Tokyo	200 m medley
Silver medal – second place	2016 Tokyo	400 m medley
Silver medal – second place	2016 Tokyo	200 m freestyle
Silver medal – second place	2016 Tokyo	4x200 m freestyle
Military World Games
Gold medal – first place	2019 Wuhan	200 m medley
Gold medal – first place	2019 Wuhan	400 m medley
Gold medal – first place	2019 Wuhan	4×200 m freestyle
Silver medal – second place	2019 Wuhan	4×100 m freestyle
Bronze medal – third place	2019 Wuhan	200 m backstroke

Wang Shun (simplified Chinese: 汪顺; traditional Chinese: 汪順; pinyin: Wāng Shùn; born 11 February 1994) is a Chinese competitive swimmer. He won a gold medal in the 200 metre individual medley at the 2020 Summer Olympics. He is the Asian record holder in the long course 200 metre individual medley. He is also the Chinese record holder in the long course 200 and 400 metre individual medley and in the short course 100, 200 and 400 metre individual medley.

In 2010, Wang won a silver medal in the 200 metre individual medley at the Asian Games. In 2015, he won a bronze medal in the 200 metre individual medley at the World Aquatics Championships. In 2016, he won a bronze medal in the 200 metre individual medley at the Summer Olympics and a gold medal at the World Swimming Championships (25 m). In 2021, he won a gold medal in the 200 metre individual medley at the Summer Olympics, breaking the Asian record. In 2024, he won another bronze medal in the 200 metre individual medley at the Summer Olympics.

== Early life ==
Wang was born in Ningbo, Zhejiang province of China. He started swimming at the age of 6. In 2007, he was selected to join the Zhejiang swimming team and train under Zhu Zhigen. In 2009, he joined the National Swimming Team.

In 2019, Wang graduated from Shanghai Jiao Tong University. In 2022, he obtained his master's degree from Beijing Sport University. Since 2023, he has been pursuing a doctorate degree at Ningbo University.

== Career ==
=== 2010 ===
In November 2010, at the age of 16, Wang represented China for the first time at the Asian Games. He earned a silver medal in the 200 m individual medley with a time of 1:59.72.

=== 2011 ===
In April 2011, at the age of 17, Wang participated in the Chinese National Championships. In the 400 m individual medley, he won a bronze medal with a time of 4:14.88. In the 200 m individual medley, he won a gold medal with a time of 1:59.50.

In July, Wang competed in the World Aquatics Championships. In the 4 × 200 m freestyle relay, he led off in 1:47.09 to help China win a bronze medal and break the National Record.

In September, Wang participated in the Chinese National Championships. In the 400 m individual medley, he broke the Asian record with a time of 4:11.61. In the 200 m individual medley, he won a gold medal with a time of 1:58.56. In the 100 m freestyle, he won a gold medal with a time of 49.78.

In October, Wang competed in the National Intercity Games of China. In the 200 m freestyle, he won a gold medal with a time of 1:46.14. In the 1500 m freestyle, he won in 14:56.92.

=== 2012 ===
Wang nursed a shoulder injury. In his Olympic debut, he finished 22nd in the 200 m individual medley in 2:00.85.

=== 2013 ===
In April 2013, Wang participated in the Chinese National Championships. In the 200 m individual medley, he won a gold medal in 1:57.50, breaking the National Record of 1:58.54 held by Zhang Zishan.

In July, Wang competed in the World Aquatics Championships. In the 200 individual medley, he placed fourth with a time of 1:56.86, setting a new Chinese National Record. In the 4 × 200 m freestyle relay, he led off in 1:47.41 to help China win a bronze medal and break the National Record.

In September, Wang competed in the National Games of China. In the 400 m individual medley, he took the gold medal with a time of 4:09.10, crushing his own National Record of 4:11.61 set in 2011. In the 200 m individual medley, he won with a time of 1:57.71.

=== 2014 ===
In May 2014, Wang participated in the Chinese Spring National Championships. In the 200 m individual medley, he won with a time of 1:57.33.

In September, Wang competed in the Asian Games. He suddenly developed a fever before the race, but he still won a bronze medal in the 200 m individual medley with a time of 1:59.10.

=== 2015 ===
In August 2015, Wang competed in the World Aquatics Championships. In the 200 m individual medley, he earned the bronze medal with a time of 1:56.81, setting a new Chinese National Record.

=== 2016 ===
In August 2016, Wang competed in the Summer Olympics. In the 200 m individual medley, he took the bronze in 1:57.05. Alongside Kosuke Hagino of Japan who claimed silver in 1:56.61, Wang became one of the first two Asian athletes to earn an Olympic medal in the men’s 200 m individual medley.

In November, Wang competed in the Asian Swimming Championships. In the 200 m individual medley, he won with a time of 1:56.66, setting a new Chinese National Record.

In December, Wang competed in World Swimming Championships (25 m). In the 200m individual medley, he took gold in 1:51.74.

=== 2017 ===
In April 2017, Wang participated in the Chinese National Championships. In the 200 m individual medley, he won gold in 1:56.16, setting a new Chinese National Record. In the 400 m individual medley, he captured the title in 4:12.65.

In July, Wang competed in the World Aquatics Championships. In the 200 m individual medley, he won a second consecutive World bronze in 1:56.28.

In August, Wang competed in the National Games of China. In the 400 m individual medley, he won gold with a time of 4:12.59. In the 200 m individual medley, he took gold with a 1:57.02.

=== 2018 ===
In August 2018, Wang competed in the Asian Games. In the 200 m individual medley, he won the gold medal with a time of 1:56.52. In the 400 m individual medley, he nabbed bronze in 4:12.31.

In December, Wang competed in the World Swimming Championships (25m). In the 200 m individual medley, he successfully defended his title in a time of 1:51.01, lowering his own Chinese Record. In the 4 × 200 m freestyle relay, he anchored in 1:41.93 to help China score bronze and notch a new Asian record.

=== 2019 ===
In March 2019, Wang participated in the Chinese National Championships. In the 200 m individual medley, he won the gold medal with a 1:56.66.

In July, Wang competed in the World Aquatics Championships. In the 200 m individual medley, he finished sixth with a time of 1:56.97.

In October, Wang competed in the Military World Games. In the 200 m individual medley, he topped the podium in 1:56.25, breaking the Military World Games record of 1:57.85 set by Jérémy Desplanches in 2017. In the 400 m individual medley, he won another gold in 4:10.13, overtaking the previous Military World Games record of 4:14.20 set by Brandonn Almeida in 2018. In the 200 m backstroke, he took bronze in 1:59.17.

=== 2020 ===
In September 2020, Wang participated in the Chinese Swimming Championships. In the 200 m individual medley, he won gold with a time of 1:56.83.

=== 2021 ===
In April 2021, Wang participated in the Chinese National Championships. In the 400 m individual medley, he won with a time of 4:12.03. In the 200 m individual medley, he touched the wall first with a time of 1:56.78.

In July, Wang competed in the Summer Olympics. In the semifinals of the 200 m individual medley, he touched first with 1:56.22. In the final, he was second behind United States' Michael Andrew in the first 150 meters but blew past Andrew in the final 50 meters. He scored the gold medal with 1:55.00, improving upon Kosuke Hagino's former Asian record of 1:55.07 which he swam in 2016.

In September, Wang competed in the National Games of China. In the 400 m individual medley, he took the title in a mark of 4:12.76. In the 200 m freestyle, he took gold in a mark of 1:46.14. In the 200 m individual medley, he beat the field in 1:56.33.

Wang was named the 2021 Asian Male Swimmer of the Year by SwimSwam.

=== 2022 ===
Wang dealt with knee injuries sustained last winter. In the World Aquatics Championships, he finished 16th in the 200 m individual medley in 2:01.35.

=== 2023 ===
In March 2023, Wang participated in the Chinese Spring Championships. In the 100 m backstroke, he won gold in a time of 54.09.

In May, Wang participated in the Chinese National Swimming Championships. In the 200 m individual medley, he took gold with a time of 1:55.45. In the 400 m individual medley, he scored the win with a time of 4:13.96. In the 200 m freestyle, he won silver with a time of 1:45.71.

In July, Wang competed in the World Aquatics Championships. He missed out on the final of the 200 m individual medley, placing 11th with a semifinal mark of 1:57.97.

Wang lit the cauldron alongside a digital torchbearer during the opening ceremony of the Asian Games in Hangzhou, China. On day one of the Asian Games, Wang crushed the fastest 200 m individual medley time of his career, getting to the wall in 1:54.62 to grab the gold and establish a new Asian record. In the 4 × 200 m freestyle relay, he led off in 1:45.96 to help China earn the silver medal. In the 400 m individual medley, he won a bronze medal with a 4:15.12.

=== 2024 ===
In April 2024, Wang participated in the Chinese National Swimming Championships. In the 100 m backstroke, he snared silver in a new personal best of 53.78. In the 200 m individual medley, he took the gold with a time of a time of 1:55.35.

In July, Wang competed in the Summer Olympics. In the 200 m individual medley, he took the bronze medal in 1:56.00.

In October, Wang competed in the World Aquatics Swimming World Cup in Shanghai. In the 100 m individual medley, he touched the wall in fourth at 51.24, cracking Daiya Seto's Asian record of 51.29. In the 200 m individual medley, he again fell fourth with a time of 1:52.40.

=== 2025 ===
In May 2025, Wang participated in the Chinese National Swimming Championships. In the 200 m individual medley, he took the top spot in 1:56.58. In the 400 m individual medley, he garnered the gold medal in 4:10.64.

In July, Wang competed in the World Aquatics Championships. In the 200 m individual medley, he finished seventh with a time of 1:57.92. In the 4 × 200 m freestyle relay, he split a 1:46.08 on the third leg to help China claim the silver medal and set a new Asian record.

In November 2025, Wang won 4 gold medals in the 2025 National Games of China, bringing his total gold medal tally in the National Games to 19, setting a new record for an athlete with the most number of gold medals in the history of the National Games of China.

== International championships (50 m) ==
Meet	200 medley	400 medley	200 freestyle	100 backstroke	4x100 freestyle	4x200 freestyle	4×100 medley	4×100 mixed medley
AG 2010	2nd place, silver medalist(s)							
WC 2011	18th					3rd place, bronze medalist(s)		
OG 2012	22nd							
AC 2012	1st place, gold medalist(s)	1st place, gold medalist(s)				1st place, gold medalist(s)		
WC 2013	4th		14th			3rd place, bronze medalist(s)		
AG 2014	3rd place, bronze medalist(s)							
WC 2015	3rd place, bronze medalist(s)							
OG 2016	3rd place, bronze medalist(s)	10th						
AC 2016	1st place, gold medalist(s)	2nd place, silver medalist(s)	2nd place, silver medalist(s)			2nd place, silver medalist(s)		
WC 2017	3rd place, bronze medalist(s)	19th	42nd			11th		
AG 2018	1st place, gold medalist(s)	3rd place, bronze medalist(s)				2nd place, silver medalist(s)		
WC 2019	6th	23rd				6th		
OG 2020	1st place, gold medalist(s)	10th				9th		
WC 2022	15th	14th					8th	
WC 2023	11th	DSQ						
AG 2022	1st place, gold medalist(s)	3rd place, bronze medalist(s)			1st place, gold medalist(s)	2nd place, silver medalist(s)	1st place, gold medalist(s)	1st place, gold medalist(s)
OG 2024	3rd place, bronze medalist(s)							
WC 2025	7th	DNS		27th		2nd place, silver medalist(s)	9th	
AG 2026	3rd place, bronze medalist(s)	3rd place, bronze medalist(s)				1st place, gold medalist(s)		

== International championships (25 m) ==
Meet	100 medley	200 medley	400 medley	4×200 freestyle
WC 2016	4th	1st place, gold medalist(s)	DNS	6th
WC 2018	6th	1st place, gold medalist(s)	DNS	3rd place, bronze medalist(s)
WC 2021		5th	DNS	

== Personal bests ==
As of October 18, 2024

=== Long course (50-meter pool) ===
Event	Time	Meet	Date	Note(s)
50 m freestyle	23.68	2023 Chinese National Swimming Championships	May 5, 2023	
100 m freestyle	48.81	2023 Chinese National Swimming Championships	May 5, 2023	
200 m freestyle	1:45.71	2023 Chinese National Swimming Championships	May 4, 2023	
1500 m freestyle	14:56.92	2011 Chinese City Games	October 17, 2011	
50 m backstroke	25.59	2019 World Cup	August 9, 2019	
100 m backstroke	53.78	2024 Chinese National Swimming Championships	April 21, 2024	
200 m backstroke	1:58.68	2015 World Cup	August 12, 2015	
50 m breaststroke	28.56	2023 Chinese National Swimming Championships	December 10, 2023	
100 m breaststroke	1:01.15	2023 Chinese National Swimming Championships	December 10, 2023	
200 m breaststroke	2:16.30	2012 Chinese National Swimming Championships	September 22, 2012	
50 m butterfly	24.53	2022 Asian Games	September 24, 2023	
100 m butterfly	52.83	2020 Chinese National Swimming Championships	September 28, 2020	
200 m butterfly	1:56.70	2013 Chinese National Swimming Championships	April 4, 2013	
200 m individual medley	1:54.62	2022 Asian Games	September 24, 2023	AS, NR
400 m individual medley	4:09.10	2013 National Games of China	September 4, 2013	NR

=== Short course (25-meter pool) ===
Event	Time	Meet	Date	Note(s)
50 m freestyle	23.64	2013 World Cup	November 5, 2013	
100 m freestyle	48.71	2013 World Cup	November 5, 2013	
200 m freestyle	1:43.43	2018 World Cup	November 11, 2018	
50 m butterfly	23.78	2016 World Cup	October 1, 2016	
100 m butterfly	53.72	2013 World Cup	November 13, 2013	
200 m butterfly	1:51.94	2013 World Cup	November 13, 2013	
100 m individual medley	51.24	2024 World Cup	October 18, 2024	AS, NR
200 m individual medley	1:51.01	2018 World Championships	December 11, 2018	NR
400 m individual medley	3:59.99	2018 World Cup	November 17, 2018	NR

Key: NR = National Record; AS = Asian Record

== Records ==
=== Long course metres (50 m pool) ===
No.	Event	Time	Meet	Location	Date	Age	Type	Status	Ref
1	400 m individual medley	4:11.61	2011 Chinese National Championships	Rizhao, China	22 September 2011	17	AS, NR	Former	
2	200 m individual medley	1:55.00	2020 Summer Olympics	Tokyo, Japan	29 July 2021	27	AS, NR	Former	
3	200 m individual medley (2)	1:54.62	2022 Asian Games	Hangzhou, China	24 September 2023	29	AS, NR	Current	

Legend: WR – World record; AS – Asian record; NR – Chinese record; e – equalled existing record;
Records not set in finals: h – heat; sf – semifinal; r – relay 1st leg; rh – relay heat 1st leg; b – B final; † – en route to final mark; so – swim-off; tt – time trial

=== Short course metres (25 m pool) ===
No.	Event	Time	Meet	Location	Date	Age	Type	Status	Ref
1	100 m individual medley	51.24	2024 World Aquatics Swimming World Cup - Shanghai	Shanghai, China	18 October 2024	30	AS, NR	Current	

Legend: WR – World record; AS – Asian record; NR – Chinese record; e – equalled existing record;
Records not set in finals: h – heat; sf – semifinal; r – relay 1st leg; rh – relay heat 1st leg; b – B final; † – en route to final mark; so – swim-off; tt – time trial
