= 2018 Pan Pacific Swimming Championships – Men's 400 metre individual medley =

Competitive international swimming event

Men's 400 metre individual medley at the 2018 Pan Pacific Swimming Championships
- Venue: Tokyo Tatsumi International Swimming Center
- Dates: 9 August (heats & finals)
- Competitors: 11 from 6 nations
- Winning time: 4:07.95

Medalists
gold medal	Chase Kalisz	United States
silver medal	Kosuke Hagino	Japan
bronze medal	Daiya Seto	Japan

The men's 400 metre individual medley competition at the 2018 Pan Pacific Swimming Championships took place on August 9 at the Tokyo Tatsumi International Swimming Center. The defending champion was Kosuke Hagino of Japan.

== Records ==
Prior to this competition, the existing world and Pan Pacific records were as follows:

World record	Michael Phelps (USA)	4:03.84	Beijing, China	10 August 2008
Pan Pacific Championships record	Ryan Lochte (USA)	4:07.59	Irvine, United States	19 August 2010

== Results ==
All times are in minutes and seconds.

KEY:	QA	Qualified A Final	QB	Qualified B Final	CR	Championships record	NR	National record	PB	Personal best	SB	Seasonal best

=== Heats ===
The first round was held on 9 August from 10:00.

Only two swimmers from each country may advance to the A or B final. If a country not qualify any swimmer to the A final, that same country may qualify up to three swimmers to the B final.

Rank	Name	Nationality	Time	Notes
1	Chase Kalisz	United States	4:10.97	QA
2	Daiya Seto	Japan	4:12.49	QA
3	Kosuke Hagino	Japan	4:12.65	QA
4	Jay Litherland	United States	4:13.00	QA
5	Sean Grieshop	United States	4:14.27	QB
6	Brandonn Almeida	Brazil	4:15.71	QA
7	Lewis Clareburt	New Zealand	4:17.93	QA
8	Hiromasa Fujimori	Japan	4:20.01	QB
9	Leonardo Santos	Brazil	4:21.60	QA
9	Tristan Cote	Canada	4:21.60	QA
11	Deng Ziqi	China	4:31.88	QB

=== B Final ===
The B final was held on 9 August from 17:30.

Rank	Name	Nationality	Time	Notes
9	Sean Grieshop	United States	4:14.33	
10	Hiromasa Fujimori	Japan	4:22.55	
11	Deng Ziqi	China	4:27.76	

=== A Final ===
The A final was held on 9 August from 17:30.

Rank	Name	Nationality	Time	Notes
1st place, gold medalist(s)	Chase Kalisz	United States	4:07.95	
2nd place, silver medalist(s)	Kosuke Hagino	Japan	4:11.13	
3rd place, bronze medalist(s)	Daiya Seto	Japan	4:12.60	
4	Jay Litherland	United States	4:12.87	
5	Lewis Clareburt	New Zealand	4:14.27	NR
6	Brandonn Almeida	Brazil	4:14.53	
7	Leonardo Santos	Brazil	4:18.90	
8	Tristan Cote	Canada	4:21.72	
