= List of Chinese records in swimming =

The Chinese records in swimming are ratified by the China's governing body in swimming, Chinese Swimming Association (CSA).

All records were achieved in finals unless otherwise noted.

== Long course (50 m) ==
=== Men ===
Event	Time		Name	Club	Date	Meet	Location	Ref
50 m freestyle	21.68		Yu Hexin	Guangdong	26 September 2021	National Games	Xi'an, China	
100 m freestyle	46.40	WR	Pan Zhanle	China	31 July 2024	Olympic Games	Paris, France	
200 m freestyle	1:43.49	AS	Zhang Zhanshuo	China	23 September 2026	Asian Games	Tokyo, Japan	
400 m freestyle	3:40.14	AS	Sun Yang	China	28 July 2012	Olympic Games	London, United Kingdom	
800 m freestyle	7:32.12	WR	Zhang Lin	China	29 Jul 2009	World Championships	Rome, Italy	
1500 m freestyle	14:31.02	AS	Sun Yang	China	4 August 2012	Olympic Games	London, Great Britain	
50 m backstroke	23.92	AS	Xu Jiayu	Zhejiang	17 June 2026	Chinese Championships	Hangzhou, China	
100 m backstroke	51.86	AS	Xu Jiayu	Zhejiang	12 April 2017	Chinese Championships	Qingdao, China	
200 m backstroke	1:53.99		Xu Jiayu	China	23 August 2018	Asian Games	Jakarta, Indonesia	
50 m breaststroke	26.20	sf, AS	Qin Haiyang	China	25 July 2023	World Championships	Fukuoka, Japan	
100 m breaststroke	57.69	=AS	Qin Haiyang	China	24 July 2023	World Championships	Fukuoka, Japan	
100 m breaststroke	57.69	=AS	Qin Haiyang	China	6 October 2023	World Cup	Berlin, Germany	
200 m breaststroke	2:05.48	WR	Qin Haiyang	China	28 July 2023	World Championships	Fukuoka, Japan	
50 m butterfly	23.21		Wang Changhao	Tianjin	20 June 2026	Chinese Championships	Hangzhou, China	
100 m butterfly	50.73	=	Xu Fang	Shandong	19 June 2026	Chinese Championships	Hangzhou, China	
100 m butterfly	50.73	=	Xu Fang	China	23 September 2026	Asian Games	Tokyo, Japan	
200 m butterfly	1:54.02	sf	Chen Juner	China	29 July 2025	World Championships	Singapore, Singapore	
200 m individual medley	1:54.62	AS	Wang Shun	China	24 September 2023	Asian Games	Hangzhou, China	
400 m individual medley	4:09.10		Wang Shun	Zhejiang	4 September 2013	Chinese Championships	Shenyang, China	
4×100 m freestyle relay	3:10.60	AS	Zhao Jiayue (48.43); Wang Haoyu (47.77); Zhang Zhanshuo (47.65); Pan Zhanle (46.75)	China	24 September 2026	Asian Games	Tokyo, Japan	
4 × 200 m freestyle relay	7:00.17	AS	Xu Haibo (1:46.27); Fei Liwei (1:46.74); Pan Zhanle (1:44.24); Zhang Zhanshuo (1:42.92)	China	21 September 2026	Asian Games	Tokyo, Japan	
4×100 m medley relay	3:27.01	AS	Xu Jiayu (52.05); Qin Haiyang (57.63); Wang Changhao (50.68); Pan Zhanle (46.65)	China	26 September 2023	Asian Games	Hangzhou, China	

Legend: # – Record awaiting ratification by CSA; WR – World record; AS – Asian record; e – equalled existing record;
Records not set in finals: h – heat; sf – semifinal; r – relay 1st leg; rh – relay heat 1st leg; b – B final; † – en route to final mark; so – swim-off; tt – time trial

=== Women ===
Event	Time		Name	Club	Date	Meet	Location	Ref
50 m freestyle	23.97	AS	Liu Xiang	Guangdong	26 September 2021	National Games	Xi'an, China	
100 m freestyle	52.48	r	Yang Junxuan	China	27 July 2024	Olympic Games	Paris, France	
200 m freestyle	1:54.26		Tang Muhan	Guangdong	22 September 2021	National Games	Xi'an, China	
400 m freestyle	3:58.21	AS	Li Bingjie	China	27 July 2025	World Championships	Singapore, Singapore	
800 m freestyle	8:13.31	AS	Li Bingjie	China	29 July 2023	World Championships	Fukuoka, Japan	
1500 m freestyle	15:41.49	h, AS	Wang Jianjiahe	China	26 July 2021	Olympic Games	Tokyo, Japan	
50m backstroke	26.98	AS	Liu Xiang	China	21 August 2018	Asian Games	Jakarta, Indonesia	
100m backstroke	58.72		Fu Yuanhui	Zhejiang	12 April 2017	Chinese Championships	Qingdao, China	
200m backstroke	2:05.77	AS	Peng Xuwei	China	22 September 2026	Asian Games	Tokyo, Japan	
50m breaststroke	29.44	AS	Tang Qianting	Shanghai	19 March 2026	China Open Championships	Shenzhen, China	
100m breaststroke	1:04.39	AS	Tang Qianting	Shanghai	21 April 2024	Chinese Championships	Shenzhen, China	
200m breaststroke	2:21.37		Qi Hui	Liberation Army	22 October 2009	National Games	Jinan, China	
50m butterfly	25.05	AS	Zhang Yufei	China	29 July 2023	World Championships	Fukuoka, Japan	
100m butterfly	55.62	h, AS	Zhang Yufei	Jiangsu	29 September 2020	Chinese Championships	Qingdao, China	
200m butterfly	2:01.81	AS	Liu Zige	Shanghai	21 Oct 2009	National Games	Jinan, China	
200m individual medley	2:06.10	AS	Yu Zidi	China	21 September 2026	Asian Games	Tokyo, Japan	
400m individual medley	4:28.43	AS	Ye Shiwen	China	28 July 2012	Olympic Games	London, United Kingdom	
4×100m freestyle relay	3:30.30	AS	Yang Junxuan (52.48); Cheng Yujie (52.76); Zhang Yufei (52.75); Wu Qingfeng (52.31)	China	27 July 2024	Olympic Games	Paris, France	
4×200m freestyle relay	7:40.33	AS	Yang Junxuan (1:54.37); Tang Muhan (1:55.00); Zhang Yufei (1:55.66); Li Bingjie (1:55.30)	China	29 July 2021	Olympic Games	Tokyo, Japan	
4×100m medley relay	3:52.19	AS	Zhao Jing (58.98); Chen Huijia (1:04.12); Jiao Liuyang (56.28); Li Zhesi (52.81)	China	1 August 2009	World Championships	Rome, Italy	

Legend: # – Record awaiting ratification by CSA; WR – World record; AS – Asian record; e – equalled existing record;
Records not set in finals: h – heat; sf – semifinal; r – relay 1st leg; rh – relay heat 1st leg; b – B final; † – en route to final mark; so – swim-off; tt – time trial

=== Mixed relay ===
Event	Time		Name	Club	Date	Meet	Location	Ref
4×100 m freestyle relay	3:21.18	AS	Pan Zhanle (47.29); Wang Haoyu (47.41); Li Bingjie (53.11); Yu Yiting (53.37)	China	17 February 2024	World Championships	Doha, Qatar	
4×100 m medley relay	3:37.55	AS	Xu Jiayu (52.13); Qin Haiyang (57.82); Zhang Yufei (55.64); Yang Junxuan (51.96)	China	3 August 2024	Olympic Games	Paris, France	

Legend: # – Record awaiting ratification by CSA; WR – World record; AS – Asian record; e – equalled existing record;
Records not set in finals: h – heat; so – swim-off

== Short course (25 m) ==
=== Men ===
Event	Time		Name	Club	Date	Meet	Location	Ref
50 m freestyle	21.26	h	Ning Zetao	China	4 December 2014	World Championships	Doha, Qatar	
100 m freestyle	45.77	AS	Pan Zhanle	China	15 December 2022	World Championships	Melbourne, Australia	
200 m freestyle	1:40.47		Zhang Zhanshuo	Hebei	28 October 2026	Chinese Championships	Beijing, China	
400 m freestyle	3:34.66		Zhang Lin	China	22 Feb 2009	Japan Open	Tokyo, Japan	
800 m freestyle	7:28.61	AS	Zhang Zhanshuo	Hebei	27 October 2026	Chinese Championships	Beijing, China	
1500 m freestyle	14:22.47		Zhang Lin	China	21 Feb 2009	Japan Open	Tokyo, Japan	
50m backstroke	22.03	r, WR	Xu Jiayu	Zhejiang	24 October 2026	Chinese Championships	Beijing, China	
100m backstroke	48.54	r, AS	Xu Jiayu	Zhejiang	27 October 2026	Chinese Championships	Beijing, China	
200m backstroke	1:48.32		Xu Jiayu	China	9 November 2018	World Cup	Tokyo, Japan	
50m breaststroke	25.38	AS	Qin Haiyang	China	19 October 2024	World Cup	Shanghai, China	
100m breaststroke	55.47	AS	Qin Haiyang	China	12 December 2024	World Championships	Budapest, Hungary	
200m breaststroke	2:01.15		Qin Haiyang	China	13 December 2018	World Championships	Hangzhou, China	
50m butterfly	21.96	AS	Sun Jiajun	Hubei	25 September 2024	Chinese Championships	Wuhan, China	
100m butterfly	49.25		Li Zhuhao	China	13 December 2018	World Championships	Hangzhou, China	
200m butterfly	1:49.37		Chen Juner	China	2 October 2026	World Cup	Baku, Azerbaijan	
100m individual medley	51.24		Wang Shun	China	18 October 2024	World Cup	Shanghai, China	
200m individual medley	1:51.01		Wang Shun	China	11 December 2018	World Championships	Hangzhou, China	
400m individual medley	3:59.99		Wang Shun	China	17 November 2018	World Cup	Singapore, Singapore	
4×50m freestyle relay	1:25.50		Zhang Zhoujian (21.67); Wang Changhao (20.88); Pan Zhanle (21.14); Yang Jintong (21.81)	China	19 December 2021	World Championships	Abu Dhabi, United Arab Emirates	
4×100m freestyle relay	3:09.10		Shen Jiahao (47.38); Hong Jinquan (46.99); Xu Yizhou (47.33); He Junyi (47.40)	Zhejiang	24 September 2024	Chinese Championships	Wuhan, China	
4×200m freestyle relay	6:47.53	AS	Ji Xinjie (1:42.67); Xu Jiayu (1:41.68); Sun Yang (1:41.25); Wang Shun (1:41.93)	China	14 December 2018	World Championships	Hangzhou, China	
4×50m medley relay	1:33.13		Wang Gukailai (24.01); Yan Zibei (25.72); Chen Juner (22.52); Pan Zhanle (20.88)	China	17 December 2022	World Championships	Melbourne, Australia	
4×100m medley relay	3:25.15		Wang Gukailai (51.54); Qin Haiyang (57.36); Chen Juner (50.16); Pan Zhanle (46.09)	China	18 December 2022	World Championships	Melbourne, Australia	

Legend: # – Record awaiting ratification by CSA; WR – World record; AS – Asian record; e – equalled existing record;
Records not set in finals: h – heat; sf – semifinal; r – relay 1st leg; rh – relay heat 1st leg; b – B final; † – en route to final mark; so – swim-off; tt – time trial

=== Women ===
Event	Time		Name	Club	Date	Meet	Location	Ref
50 m freestyle	23.72		Zhang Yufei	Jiangsu	28 October 2026	Chinese Championships	Beijing, China	
100 m freestyle	51.78		Yang Junxuan	China	29 October 2022	Chinese Championships	Beijing, China	
200 m freestyle	1:51.25		Li Bingjie	China	28 October 2022	Chinese Championships	Beijing, China	
400 m freestyle	3:51.30	AS	Li Bingjie	China	27 October 2022	Chinese Championships	Beijing, China	
800 m freestyle	7:59.44	AS	Wang Jianjiahe	China	6 October 2018	World Cup	Budapest, Hungary	
1500 m freestyle	15:34.09	AS	Li Bingjie	Hebei	26 October 2026	Chinese Championships	Beijing, China	
50 m backstroke	25.82	AS	Zhao Jing	China	10 Nov 2009	World Cup	Stockholm, Sweden	
100 m backstroke	55.48		Gao Chang	China	28 February 2010	Japan Open	Tokyo, Japan	
200 m backstroke	2:01.70		Peng Xuwei	Hubei	28 October 2026	Chinese Championships	Beijing, China	
50 m breaststroke	28.76	AS	Tang Qianting	China	20 October 2024	World Cup	Shanghai, China	
100 m breaststroke	1:02.37	sf, AS	Tang Qianting	China	11 December 2024	World Championships	Budapest, Hungary	
200 m breaststroke	2:18.09		Sun Ye	China	19 December 2010	World Championships	Dubai, United Arab Emirates	
50 m butterfly	24.71	=AS	Zhang Yufei	China	14 December 2022	World Championships	Melbourne, Australia	
100 m butterfly	54.87		Zhang Yufei	Jiangsu	27 October 2026	Chinese Championships	Beijing, China	
200 m butterfly	2:00.78	AS	Liu Zige	China	15 Nov 2009	World Cup	Berlin, Germany	
100m individual medley	56.99	AS	Yu Yiting	China	1 October 2026	World Cup	Baku, Azerbaijan	
200m individual medley	2:02.63	AS	Yu Yiting	China	17 October 2026	World Cup	Astana, Kazakhstan	
400m individual medley	4:22.74		Yu Yiting	China	15 October 2026	World Cup	Astana, Kazakhstan	
4×50m freestyle relay	1:35.00	AS	Cheng Yujie (24.27); Zhang Yufei (23.12); Zhu Menghui (23.90); Wu Qingfeng (23.71)	China	21 December 2021	World Championships	Abu Dhabi, United Arab Emirates	
4×100m freestyle relay	3:29.81	AS	Tang Yi (52.27); Zhu Qianwei (52.60); Pang Jiaying (52.94); Li Zhesi (52.00)	China	18 December 2010	World Championships	Dubai, United Arab Emirates	
4×200m freestyle relay	7:34.08	AS	Li Bingjie (1:54.56); Yang Junxuan (1:53.06); Zhang Yuhan (1:53.94); Wang Jianjiahe (1:52.52)	China	15 December 2018	World Championships	Hangzhou, China	
4×50m medley relay	1:44.31	AS	Fu Yuanhui (26.20); Suo Ran (29.63); Wang Yichun (24.84); Wu Yue (23.64)	China	12 December 2018	World Championships	Hangzhou, China	
4×100m medley relay	3:47.41	AS	Peng Xuwei (57.12); Tang Qianting (1:03.25); Zhang Yufei (54.93); Cheng Yujie (52.11)	China	21 December 2021	World Championships	Abu Dhabi, United Arab Emirates	

Legend: # – Record awaiting ratification by CSA; WR – World record; AS – Asian record; e – equalled existing record;
Records not set in finals: h – heat; sf – semifinal; r – relay 1st leg; rh – relay heat 1st leg; b – B final; † – en route to final mark; so – swim-off; tt – time trial

=== Mixed relay ===
Event	Time		Name	Club	Date	Meet	Location	Ref
4×50 m freestyle relay	1:30.14		Zhao Jiayue (21.47); Zhang Xumeng (21.32); Zhang Yufei (23.59); Yang Wenwen (23.76)	Jiangsu	26 October 2026	Chinese Championships	Beijing, China	
4×50 m medley relay	1:37.31	AS	Wang Gukailai (23.74); Yan Zibei (25.41); Zhang Yufei (24.54); Wu Qingfeng (23.62)	China	14 December 2022	World Championships	Melbourne, Australia	
4×100 m medley relay	3:36.00	AS	Xu Jiayu (48.54); Xie Yichen (57.27); Lyu Yue (57.49); Liu Yaxin (52.70)	Zhejiang	27 October 2026	Chinese Championships	Beijing, China	

Legend: # – Record awaiting ratification by CSA; e – equalled existing record;
Records not set in finals: h – heat; so – swim-off
