= Swimming at the 2018 Asian Games – Men's 200 metre individual medley =

Men's 200 metre individual medley at the 2018 Asian Games
- Venue: Gelora Bung Karno Aquatic Stadium
- Date: 20 August 2018
- Competitors: 21 from 15 nations

Medalists
gold medal	Wang Shun	China
silver medal	Kosuke Hagino	Japan
bronze medal	Qin Haiyang	China

The men's 200 metre individual medley event at the 2018 Asian Games took place on 20 August at the Gelora Bung Karno Aquatic Stadium.

== Schedule ==
All times are Western Indonesia Time (UTC+07:00)

Date	Time	Event
Monday, 20 August 2018	09:45	Heats
Monday, 20 August 2018	18:59	Final

== Records ==
Prior to this competition, the existing world, Asian and Games records were as follows.

World Record	Ryan Lochte (USA)	1:54.00	Shanghai, China	28 July 2011
Asian Record	Kosuke Hagino (JPN)	1:55.07	Tokyo, Japan	9 April 2016
Games Record	Kosuke Hagino (JPN)	1:55.34	Incheon, South Korea	22 September 2014

== Results ==
=== Heats ===
Rank	Heat	Athlete	Time	Notes
1	3	Kosuke Hagino (JPN)	1:59.76	
2	1	Qin Haiyang (CHN)	2:00.40	
3	2	Wang Shun (CHN)	2:01.34	
4	3	Daiya Seto (JPN)	2:01.57	
5	3	Wang Hsing-hao (TPE)	2:02.18	
6	2	Kenneth To (HKG)	2:02.50	
7	2	Pang Sheng Jun (SGP)	2:02.64	
8	1	Triady Fauzi Sidiq (INA)	2:03.32	
9	3	Kim Min-suk (KOR)	2:04.02	
10	1	Joo Jae-gu (KOR)	2:04.05	
11	2	Paul Lê Nguyễn (VIE)	2:05.08	
12	1	Lionel Khoo (SGP)	2:06.12	
13	2	Raymond Mak (HKG)	2:07.13	
14	3	Neel Roy (IND)	2:08.07	
15	3	Nuttapong Ketin (THA)	2:09.08	
16	3	Abdulrahman Al-Kulaibi (OMA)	2:13.95	
17	2	Abdelrahman Hesham Mohamed (QAT)	2:16.84	
18	3	Muhammad Yahya Khan (PAK)	2:20.31	
19	1	Batmönkhiin Jürmed (MGL)	2:21.28	
20	2	Erdenemönkhiin Demüül (MGL)	2:26.46	
21	1	Mubal Azzam Ibrahim (MDV)	2:32.87	

=== Final ===
Rank	Athlete	Time	Notes
1st place, gold medalist(s)	Wang Shun (CHN)	1:56.52	
2nd place, silver medalist(s)	Kosuke Hagino (JPN)	1:56.75	
3rd place, bronze medalist(s)	Qin Haiyang (CHN)	1:57.09	
4	Daiya Seto (JPN)	1:57.13	
5	Kenneth To (HKG)	2:01.76	
6	Triady Fauzi Sidiq (INA)	2:02.09	
7	Wang Hsing-hao (TPE)	2:02.68	
8	Pang Sheng Jun (SGP)	2:03.08	
