= 2018 FINA World Swimming Championships (25 m) – Men's 200 metre individual medley =

Men's 200 metre individual medley at the 2018 FINA World Swimming Championships (25 m)
- Venue: Hangzhou Sports Park Stadium
- Dates: 11 December (heats and final)
- Competitors: 43 from 35 nations
- Winning time: 1:51.01

Medalists
gold medal	Wang Shun	China
silver medal	Josh Prenot	United States
bronze medal	Hiromasa Fujimori	Japan

The Men's 200 metre individual medley competition of the 2018 FINA World Swimming Championships (25 m) was held on 11 December 2018.

== Records ==
Prior to the competition, the existing world and championship records were as follows.

	Name	Nation	Time	Location	Date
World record Championship record	Ryan Lochte	United States	1:49.63	Istanbul	14 December 2012

== Results ==
=== Heats ===
The heats were started on 11 December at 12:06.

Rank	Heat	Lane	Name	Nationality	Time	Notes
1	5	4	Wang Shun	China	1:53.18	Q
2	4	4	Caio Pumputis	Brazil	1:53.33	Q
3	4	0	Josh Prenot	United States	1:53.44	Q
4	4	5	Hiromasa Fujimori	Japan	1:53.48	Q
5	3	3	Leonardo Coelho Santos	Brazil	1:53.53	Q
6	2	3	Jan Świtkowski	Poland	1:53.60	Q, NR
7	5	5	Kliment Kolesnikov	Russia	1:53.63	Q, WD
8	3	4	Mitch Larkin	Australia	1:53.69	Q
9	4	6	Bradlee Ashby	New Zealand	1:54.13	Q, NR
10	3	5	Tomoe Zenimoto Hvas	Norway	1:54.34	
10	5	3	Diogo Carvalho	Portugal	1:54.34	
12	5	6	Simon Sjödin	Sweden	1:54.41	
13	4	2	Alexis Santos	Portugal	1:54.71	
14	3	8	Gunnar Bentz	United States	1:54.92	
15	4	3	Semen Makovich	Russia	1:55.19	
16	4	8	Mark Szaranek	Great Britain	1:55.25	
17	3	9	Tomas Peribonio	Ecuador	1:55.32	
18	3	6	Hugo González	Spain	1:55.84	
19	5	7	Takeharu Fujimori	Japan	1:56.11	
20	3	2	Thomas Ceccon	Italy	1:56.20	
21	4	7	David Schlicht	Australia	1:56.48	
22	5	0	Raphaël Stacchiotti	Luxembourg	1:56.56	
23	3	7	Marc Sánchez	Spain	1:56.90	
24	5	2	Kenneth To	Hong Kong	1:57.19	
25	3	1	Dániel Dudás	Hungary	1:57.84	
26	5	1	Wang Hsing-hao	Chinese Taipei	1:58.72	
27	5	8	Ayrton Sweeney	South Africa	1:58.76	
28	4	1	Wang Yizhe	China	1:58.81	
29	2	6	Kaloyan Bratanov	Bulgaria	1:59.77	
30	3	0	Jaouad Syoud	Algeria	2:00.10	
31	2	0	Brandon Schuster	Samoa	2:00.77	
32	2	5	Jarod Arroyo	Puerto Rico	2:00.97	
33	4	9	Adam Halas	Slovakia	2:01.38	
34	5	9	Kristinn Þórarinsson	Iceland	2:01.63	
35	2	2	Patrick Groters	Aruba	2:02.16	
36	2	7	Luis Vega Torres	Cuba	2:03.61	
37	2	1	Malcolm Low	Singapore	2:05.41	
38	2	4	Daniils Bobrovs	Latvia	2:06.04	
39	2	8	Lin Sizhuang	Macau	2:07.82	
40	2	9	Tasi Limtiaco	Federated States of Micronesia	2:08.69	
41	1	4	Ousmane Touré	Mali	2:17.61	
42	1	3	Nadeem Younas	Pakistan	2:23.38	
43	1	5	Mubal Azzam Ibrahim	Maldives	2:26.35	

=== Final ===
The final was held on 11 December at 20:29.

Rank	Lane	Name	Nationality	Time	Notes
1st place, gold medalist(s)	4	Wang Shun	China	1:51.01	NR
2nd place, silver medalist(s)	3	Josh Prenot	United States	1:52.69	
3rd place, bronze medalist(s)	6	Hiromasa Fujimori	Japan	1:52.73	
4	1	Mitch Larkin	Australia	1:52.78	
5	5	Caio Pumputis	Brazil	1:53.05	
6	5	Leonardo Coelho Santos	Brazil	1:53.38	
7	7	Jan Świtkowski	Poland	1:53.96	
8	8	Bradlee Ashby	New Zealand	1:54.01	NR
