= Chinese Swimming Association =

Governing body of aquatic sports in China

Chinese Swimming Association 中国游泳协会
- Sport: swimming, diving, synchronized swimming, water polo, and open water swimming
- Founded: 1956
- Affiliation: International Swimming Federation (FINA); Asia Swimming Federation (AASF)
- Location: Beijing, China
- President: Zhou Jihong

Official website
- swimming.sport.org.cn

The Chinese Swimming Association (Chinese: 中国游泳协会) is the national federation which oversees aquatic sports in China. It is a national non-governmental, nonprofit sports organization which oversees competition in swimming, diving, synchronized swimming, water polo, and open water swimming.

It is affiliated with:

- FINA, the International Swimming Federation;
- the Asia Swimming Federation, the aquatics Continental Association for Asia;
- the Chinese Olympic Committee; and
- the All-China Sports Federation.

== See also ==
- List of Chinese records in swimming
