= Swimming at the 2014 Asian Games – Men's 200 metre individual medley =

Men's 200 metre individual medley at the 2014 Asian Games
- Venue: Munhak Park Tae-hwan Aquatics Center
- Date: 22 September 2014
- Competitors: 21 from 13 nations

Medalists
gold medal	Kosuke Hagino	Japan
silver medal	Hiromasa Fujimori	Japan
bronze medal	Wang Shun	China

The men's 200 metre individual medley event at the 2014 Asian Games took place on 22 September 2014 at Munhak Park Tae-hwan Aquatics Center.

== Schedule ==
All times are Korea Standard Time (UTC+09:00)

Date	Time	Event
Monday, 22 September 2014	09:00	Heats
Monday, 22 September 2014	19:40	Final

== Records ==
Prior to this competition, the existing world, Asian and Games records were as follows.

World Record	Ryan Lochte (USA)	1:54.00	Shanghai, China	28 July 2011
Asian Record	Kosuke Hagino (JPN)	1:55.33	Kanagawa, Japan	6 September 2014
Games Record	Ken Takakuwa (JPN)	1:58.31	Guangzhou, China	17 November 2010

== Results ==
Legend

- DNS — Did not start
- DSQ — Disqualified

=== Heats ===
Rank	Heat	Athlete	Time	Notes
1	2	Hiromasa Fujimori (JPN)	2:00.75	
2	2	Joseph Schooling (SIN)	2:00.78	
3	3	Kosuke Hagino (JPN)	2:00.85	
4	1	Wang Shun (CHN)	2:02.39	
5	1	Triady Fauzi Sidiq (INA)	2:02.47	
6	3	Mao Feilian (CHN)	2:03.26	
7	1	Jung Won-yong (KOR)	2:03.91	
8	3	Aleksey Derlyugov (UZB)	2:04.00	
9	3	Kim Min-gyu (KOR)	2:04.41	
10	2	Trần Duy Khôi (VIE)	2:05.61	
11	3	Pang Sheng Jun (SIN)	2:06.06	
12	1	Wen Ren-hau (TPE)	2:06.77	
13	2	Huang Yen-hsin (TPE)	2:07.02	
14	2	Raymond Mak (HKG)	2:07.48	
15	1	Dmitriy Shvetsov (UZB)	2:07.84	
16	3	Ayman Klzie (SYR)	2:09.16	
17	1	Derick Ng (HKG)	2:11.37	
18	2	Sooud Al-Tayyar (KUW)	2:19.49	
19	3	Ali Boabbas (KUW)	2:19.80	
—	2	Nishwan Ibrahim (MDV)	DSQ	
—	1	Nisar Ahmed (PAK)	DNS	

=== Final ===
Rank	Athlete	Time	Notes
1st place, gold medalist(s)	Kosuke Hagino (JPN)	1:55.34	GR
2nd place, silver medalist(s)	Hiromasa Fujimori (JPN)	1:58.56	
3rd place, bronze medalist(s)	Wang Shun (CHN)	1:59.10	
4	Joseph Schooling (SIN)	2:00.11	
5	Mao Feilian (CHN)	2:00.69	
6	Triady Fauzi Sidiq (INA)	2:02.80	
7	Jung Won-yong (KOR)	2:03.10	
8	Aleksey Derlyugov (UZB)	2:03.77	
