= Wang Changhao =

Chinese swimmer (born 2002)

Personal information
- Nationality: Chinese
- Born: August 1, 2002 (age 24)

Sport
- Sport: Swimming
- Event: Butterfly
Medal record
Men's swimming
Representing China
Olympic Games
Gold medal – first place	2024 Paris	4x100 m medley
World Championships (LC)
Silver medal – second place	2023 Fukuoka	4×100 m medley
Asian Games
Gold medal – first place	2022 Hangzhou	4×100 m freestyle
Gold medal – first place	2022 Hangzhou	4×100 m medley
Silver medal – second place	2022 Hangzhou	100 m butterfly
Bronze medal – third place	2026 Aichi–Nagoya	50 m butterfly

Wang Changhao (Chinese: 王长浩; pinyin: Wáng Chánghào, born August 1, 2002) is a Chinese swimmer who specialize in butterfly events. In 2023, Wang Changhao set a Chinese record in the 50m butterfly. At the 2024 Summer Olympics, he was part of China's gold-winning 4 × 100m men's medley relay team, earning China's first medal in the event and ending the US's winning streak since 1960.

== See also ==
- List of Chinese records in swimming
- China at the 2024 Summer Olympics
