= 2016 FINA World Swimming Championships (25 m) – Men's 200 metre individual medley =

Men's 200 metre individual medley at the 2016 FINA World Swimming Championships (25 m)
- Venue: WFCU Centre
- Dates: 6 December (heats and final)
- Competitors: 68 from 53 nations
- Winning time: 1:51.74

Medalists
gold medal	Wang Shun	China
silver medal	Philip Heintz	Germany
bronze medal	Daiya Seto	Japan

The Men's 200 metre individual medley competition of the 2016 FINA World Swimming Championships (25 m) was held on 6 December 2016.

== Records ==
Prior to the competition, the existing world and championship records were as follows.

	Name	Nation	Time	Location	Date
World record Championship record	Ryan Lochte	United States	1:49.63	Istanbul	14 December 2012

== Results ==
=== Heats ===
The heats were held at 12:59.

Rank	Heat	Lane	Name	Nationality	Time	Notes
1	5	4	Daiya Seto	Japan	1:53.49	Q
2	1	1	Mark Szaranek	Great Britain	1:53.77	Q
3	5	3	Kirill Prigoda	Russia	1:53.94	Q, NR
4	6	4	Philip Heintz	Germany	1:54.07	Q
5	7	5	Josh Prenot	United States	1:54.10	Q
6	7	4	Wang Shun	China	1:54.21	Q
7	6	1	Andreas Vazaios	Greece	1:54.30	Q, NR
8	7	3	Takeharu Fujimori	Japan	1:54.37	Q
9	6	3	Simon Sjödin	Sweden	1:54.47	
10	5	6	Daniil Pasynkov	Russia	1:55.03	
11	7	6	Clyde Lewis	Australia	1:55.13	
12	6	5	Diogo Carvahlo	Portugal	1:55.26	
13	5	5	Thiago Simon	Brazil	1:55.51	
13	6	2	Jérémy Desplanches	Switzerland	1:55.51	
15	5	2	Alexis Santos	Portugal	1:55.77	
16	1	7	Jakub Maly	Austria	1:56.69	
17	4	7	Evan White	Canada	1:56.90	
18	6	8	Neil Fair	South Africa	1:57.27	
19	6	6	Hu Yixuan	China	1:57.30	
19	6	7	Kyle Stolk	Netherlands	1:57.30	
21	5	7	Dávid Földházi	Hungary	1:57.51	
22	7	0	Daniel Skaaning	Denmark	1:57.68	
23	7	7	Michael Andrew	United States	1:57.87	
24	7	1	Markus Lie	Norway	1:57.98	
25	7	8	Tomas Peribonio	Ecuador	1:58.28	NR
26	4	2	Jan Šefl	Czech Republic	1:58.43	
27	6	0	Uvis Kalniņš	Latvia	1:58.47	
28	7	2	Daniel Wallace	Great Britain	1:58.81	
29	4	8	Martti Aljand	Estonia	1:58.98	
30	3	4	Frank Krznaric	Croatia	1:59.06	
31	5	1	Richárd Nagy	Slovakia	1:59.27	
32	4	6	Márton Barta	Hungary	1:59.79	
33	4	4	Joan Lluís Pons	Spain	2:00.03	
34	5	0	Adam Halas	Slovakia	2:00.60	
35	5	9	Luke Reilly	Canada	2:00.74	
36	6	9	Kristinn Þórarinsson	Iceland	2:01.36	
37	5	8	Eben Vorster	South Africa	2:01.42	
38	1	8	Trần Duy Khôi	Vietnam	2:01.53	
39	3	8	Keanan Dols	Jamaica	2:02.06	NR
40	7	9	Pang Sheng Jun	Singapore	2:02.37	
41	4	0	Wen Ren-hau	Chinese Taipei	2:02.63	
42	4	1	Matías López	Paraguay	2:02.86	
43	3	5	Sajan Prakash	India	2:03.54	NR
44	3	6	Luis Vega Torres	Cuba	2:03.58	NR
45	4	3	Lionel Khoo	Singapore	2:03.78	
46	2	0	Kyle Abeysinghe	Sri Lanka	2:04.17	NR
47	3	0	Jarod Arroyo	Puerto Rico	2:04.71	
48	3	3	Yeziel Morales Miranda	Puerto Rico	2:04.72	
49	3	1	Esteban Araya	Costa Rica	2:04.91	NR
50	2	8	Alberto Batungbacal	Philippines	2:05.00	
51	3	7	Felipe Quiroz Uteau	Chile	2:05.09	NR
52	2	5	Lin Sizhuang	Macau	2:05.58	NR
53	4	5	Mak Ho Lu Raymond	Hong Kong	2:05.67	
54	3	9	Said Saber	Morocco	2:06.29	
55	2	3	Brandon Vives	Dominican Republic	2:08.57	
56	2	6	Brandon Schuster	Samoa	2:08.62	NR
57	2	4	Colin Bensadon	Gibraltar	2:09.31	
58	2	2	Mathias Zacarias	Paraguay	2:10.45	
59	4	9	Carlos Claverie	Venezuela	2:10.68	
60	2	7	Noah Al-Khulaifi	Qatar	2:16.27	
61	2	9	Kennet Libohova	Albania	2:17.62	
62	2	1	Fausto Huerta	Dominican Republic	2:20.05	
63	1	4	Carlos Vasquez	Honduras	2:20.68	NR
64	1	5	Stanford Kawale	Papua New Guinea	2:24.47	
65	1	3	Mark Hoare	Eswatini	2:27.66	
66	1	6	Christian Villacrusis	Northern Mariana Islands	2:31.79	
67	1	2	Salofi Welch	Northern Mariana Islands	2:32.17	
	4	0	Jonathan Gómez	Colombia		DNS

=== Final ===
The final was held at 19:59.

Rank	Lane	Name	Nationality	Time	Notes
1st place, gold medalist(s)	7	Wang Shun	China	1:51.74	
2nd place, silver medalist(s)	6	Philip Heintz	Germany	1:52.07	
3rd place, bronze medalist(s)	4	Daiya Seto	Japan	1:52.89	
4	2	Josh Prenot	United States	1:52.91	
5	3	Kirill Prigoda	Russia	1:53.47	NR
6	5	Mark Szaranek	Great Britain	1:54.45	
7	8	Takeharu Fujimori	Japan	1:55.51	
8	1	Andreas Vazaios	Greece	1:55.80	
