= Swimming at the 2018 Asian Games – Men's 400 metre individual medley =

Men's 400 metre individual medley at the 2018 Asian Games
- Venue: Gelora Bung Karno Aquatic Stadium
- Date: 22 August 2018
- Competitors: 17 from 11 nations

Medalists
gold medal	Daiya Seto	Japan
silver medal	Kosuke Hagino	Japan
bronze medal	Wang Shun	China

The men's 400 metre individual medley event at the 2018 Asian Games took place on 22 August at the Gelora Bung Karno Aquatic Stadium.

== Schedule ==
All times are Western Indonesia Time (UTC+07:00)

Date	Time	Event
Wednesday, 22 August 2018	09:47	Heats
Wednesday, 22 August 2018	18:56	Final

== Records ==
Prior to this competition, the existing world, Asian and Games records were as follows.

World Record	Michael Phelps (USA)	4:03.84	Beijing, China	10 August 2008
Asian Record	Kosuke Hagino (JPN)	4:06.05	Rio de Janeiro, Brazil	6 August 2016
Games Record	Kosuke Hagino (JPN)	4:07.75	Incheon, South Korea	24 September 2014

== Results ==
=== Heats ===
Rank	Heat	Athlete	Time	Notes
1	3	Daiya Seto (JPN)	4:16.16	
2	2	Kosuke Hagino (JPN)	4:16.17	
3	3	Wang Shun (CHN)	4:18.67	
4	2	Wang Yizhe (CHN)	4:21.55	
5	2	Kim Min-suk (KOR)	4:21.95	
6	2	Cho Cheng-chi (TPE)	4:23.01	
7	3	Joo Jae-gu (KOR)	4:23.86	
8	3	Nguyễn Hữu Kim Sơn (VIE)	4:27.18	
9	3	Wang Hsing-hao (TPE)	4:27.99	
10	2	Aflah Fadlan Prawira (INA)	4:29.00	
11	2	Zachary Tan (SGP)	4:29.87	
12	3	Pang Sheng Jun (SGP)	4:29.94	
13	3	Marcus Mok (HKG)	4:33.46	
14	2	Jonathan Liao (HKG)	4:41.60	
15	1	Abdelrahman Hesham Mohamed (QAT)	4:46.30	
16	1	Abdulrahman Al-Kulaibi (OMA)	4:54.22	
17	1	Mubal Azzam Ibrahim (MDV)	5:35.41	

=== Final ===
Rank	Athlete	Time	Notes
1st place, gold medalist(s)	Daiya Seto (JPN)	4:08.79	
2nd place, silver medalist(s)	Kosuke Hagino (JPN)	4:10.30	
3rd place, bronze medalist(s)	Wang Shun (CHN)	4:12.31	
4	Wang Yizhe (CHN)	4:19.61	
5	Joo Jae-gu (KOR)	4:20.77	
6	Nguyễn Hữu Kim Sơn (VIE)	4:22.86	
7	Cho Cheng-chi (TPE)	4:23.18	
8	Kim Min-suk (KOR)	4:23.39	
