= Swimming at the 2022 Asian Games – Men's 4 × 100 metre medley relay =

Men's 4 × 100 metre medley relay at the 2022 Asian Games
- Venue: Hangzhou Olympic Expo Aquatics Center
- Date: 26 September 2023
- Competitors: 76 from 16 nations

Medalists
gold medal	China; Xu Jiayu, Qin Haiyang, Wang Changhao, Pan Zhanle, Wang Shun, Yan Zibei, Sun Jiajun, Wang Haoyu
silver medal	South Korea; Lee Ju-ho, Choi Dong-yeol, Kim Young-beom, Hwang Sun-woo, Cho Sung-jae, Kim Ji-hun, Lee Ho-joon
bronze medal	Japan; Ryosuke Irie, Yuya Hinomoto, Katsuhiro Matsumoto, Katsumi Nakamura, Daiki Yanagawa, Naoki Mizunuma

The men's 4 × 100 metre medley relay event at the 2022 Asian Games took place on 26 September 2023 at the Hangzhou Olympic Expo Center.

== Schedule ==
All times are China Standard Time (UTC+08:00)

Date	Time	Event
Tuesday, 26 September 2023	11:35	Heats
Tuesday, 26 September 2023	21:01	Final

== Records ==
Prior to this competition, the existing world, Asian and Games records were as follows.

World Record	United States	3:26.78	Tokyo, Japan	1 August 2021
Asian Record	China	3:29.00	Fukuoka, Japan	30 July 2023
Games Record	China	3:29.99	Jakarta, Indonesia	24 August 2018

== Results ==
=== Heats ===
Rank	Heat	Team	Time	Notes
1	2	China (CHN)	3:34.80	
		Wang Shun	53.87	
		Yan Zibei	1:00.12	
		Sun Jiajun	52.07	
		Wang Haoyu	48.74	
2	1	Japan (JPN)	3:37.03	
		Daiki Yanagawa	55.58	
		Yuya Hinomoto	1:00.03	
		Naoki Mizunuma	52.29	
		Katsumi Nakamura	49.13	
3	2	South Korea (KOR)	3:38.96	
		Lee Ju-ho	55.39	
		Cho Sung-jae	1:01.80	
		Kim Ji-hun	52.89	
		Lee Ho-joon	48.88	
4	1	India (IND)	3:40.84	
		Srihari Nataraj	55.33	
		Likith Prema	1:02.23	
		Sajan Prakash	53.36	
		Tanish George Mathew	49.92	
5	2	Hong Kong (HKG)	3:42.40	
		Hayden Kwan	56.20	
		Benson Wong	1:02.30	
		Ng Cheuk Yin	53.78	
		Cheuk Ming Ho	50.12	
6	1	Chinese Taipei (TPE)	3:43.03	
		Chuang Mu-lun	55.95	
		Cai Bing-rong	1:03.30	
		Wang Kuan-hung	53.32	
		Wang Hsing-hao	50.46	
7	1	Singapore (SGP)	3:43.21	
		Zachary Tan	56.85	
		Maximillian Ang	1:02.32	
		Ardi Zulhilmi Azman	54.60	
		Mikkel Lee	49.44	
8	1	Thailand (THA)	3:43.52	
		Tonnam Kanteemool	56.23	
		Thanonchai Janruksa	1:03.74	
		Navaphat Wongcharoen	53.59	
		Dulyawat Kaewsriyong	49.96	
9	2	Indonesia (INA)	3:45.45	
		Farrel Armandio Tangkas	56.61	
		Muhammad Dwiky Raharjo	1:02.79	
		Joe Kurniawan	53.99	
		Karel Subagyo	52.06	
10	2	Malaysia (MAS)	3:46.12	
		Khiew Hoe Yean	57.57	
		Hii Puong Wei	1:04.42	
		Bryan Leong	53.35	
		Lim Yin Chuen	50.78	
11	2	Vietnam (VIE)	3:54.09	
		Đỗ Ngọc Vinh	1:01.13	
		Phạm Thanh Bảo	1:01.42	
		Nguyễn Hoàng Khang	1:00.69	
		Ngô Đình Chuyền	50.85	
12	1	Macau (MAC)	3:58.43	
		Chan Si Chon	1:02.54	
		Choi Ngou Fai	1:04.51	
		Lam Chi Chong	58.03	
		Ng Chi Hin	53.35	
13	2	Qatar (QAT)	3:59.87	
		Abdalla El-Ghamry	1:01.16	
		Abdulla Al-Khaldi	1:08.01	
		Tameem El-Hamayda	57.69	
		Ahmed Diab	53.01	
14	1	Mongolia (MGL)	4:04.23	
		Khash-Erdeniin Tselmeg	1:02.58	
		Ganzorigtyn Sugar	1:08.22	
		Batbayaryn Enkhtamir	58.44	
		Sodovjamtsyn Sodmandakh	54.99	
15	1	Pakistan (PAK)	4:24.81	
		Muhammad Amaan Siddiqui	1:06.80	
		Muhammad Hamza Anwar	1:20.06	
		Azhar Abbas	1:03.43	
		Muhammad Ahmed Durrani	54.52	
16	2	Maldives (MDV)	4:25.69	
		Ali Imaan	1:04.51	
		Mubal Azzam Ibrahim	1:15.49	
		Mohamed Rihan Shiham	1:03.52	
		Ahmed Neeq Niyaz	1:02.17	

=== Final ===
Rank	Team	Time	Notes
1st place, gold medalist(s)	China (CHN)	3:27.01	AR
	Xu Jiayu	52.05	
	Qin Haiyang	57.63	
	Wang Changhao	50.68	
	Pan Zhanle	46.65	
2nd place, silver medalist(s)	South Korea (KOR)	3:32.05	
	Lee Ju-ho	53.54	
	Choi Dong-yeol	59.12	
	Kim Young-beom	51.76	
	Hwang Sun-woo	47.63	
3rd place, bronze medalist(s)	Japan (JPN)	3:32.52	
	Ryosuke Irie	53.71	
	Yuya Hinomoto	59.72	
	Katsuhiro Matsumoto	50.93	
	Katsumi Nakamura	48.16	
4	Chinese Taipei (TPE)	3:38.35	
	Chuang Mu-lun	55.00	
	Cai Bing-rong	1:01.49	
	Wang Kuan-hung	51.80	
	Wang Hsing-hao	50.06	
5	India (IND)	3:40.20	
	Srihari Nataraj	55.07	
	Likith Prema	1:01.46	
	Sajan Prakash	53.16	
	Tanish George Mathew	50.51	
6	Hong Kong (HKG)	3:42.99	
	Hayden Kwan	56.54	
	Benson Wong	1:02.49	
	Ng Cheuk Yin	53.60	
	Cheuk Ming Ho	50.36	
7	Thailand (THA)	3:43.18	
	Tonnam Kanteemool	55.75	
	Thanonchai Janruksa	1:03.11	
	Navaphat Wongcharoen	53.96	
	Dulyawat Kaewsriyong	50.36	
8	Singapore (SGP)	3:46.07	
	Zackery Tay	57.56	
	Zachary Tan	1:02.12	
	Jerald Lium	55.62	
	Darren Chua	50.77	
