= Swimming at the 2022 Asian Games – Men's 200 metre individual medley =

Men's 200 metre individual medley at the 2022 Asian Games
- Venue: Hangzhou Olympic Expo Aquatics Center
- Date: 24 September 2023
- Competitors: 27 from 18 nations

Medalists
gold medal	Wang Shun	China
silver medal	Qin Haiyang	China
bronze medal	Daiya Seto	Japan

The men's 200 metre individual medley event at the 2022 Asian Games took place on 24 September 2023 at the Hangzhou Olympic Expo Center.

== Schedule ==
All times are China Standard Time (UTC+08:00)

Date	Time	Event
Sunday, 24 September 2023	10:10	Heats
Sunday, 24 September 2023	19:38	Final

== Records ==
Prior to this competition, the existing world, Asian and Games records were as follows.

World Record	Ryan Lochte (USA)	1:54.00	Shanghai, China	28 July 2011
Asian Record	Wang Shun (CHN)	1:55.00	Tokyo, Japan	30 July 2021
Games Record	Kosuke Hagino (JPN)	1:55.34	Incheon, South Korea	22 September 2014

== Results ==
=== Heats ===
Rank	Heat	Athlete	Time	Notes
1	4	Qin Haiyang (CHN)	1:58.72	
2	4	Wang Shun (CHN)	1:58.84	
3	3	Daiya Seto (JPN)	1:59.55	
4	2	So Ogata (JPN)	2:00.05	
5	2	Wang Hsing-hao (TPE)	2:00.62	
6	3	Kim Min-suk (KOR)	2:01.11	
7	3	Zachary Tan (SGP)	2:02.44	
8	2	Maximillian Ang (SGP)	2:03.08	
9	4	Trần Hưng Nguyên (VIE)	2:03.53	
10	3	Nguyễn Quang Thuấn (VIE)	2:04.45	
11	4	Munzer Kabbara (LBN)	2:04.63	
12	2	Egor Petryakov (UZB)	2:05.19	
13	2	Lau Ping Chi (HKG)	2:05.29	
14	1	Matin Sohran (IRI)	2:05.87	
15	4	Tan Khai Xin (MAS)	2:06.18	
16	3	James Lau (HKG)	2:07.02	
17	4	Surasit Thongdeang (THA)	2:08.08	
18	4	Pongpanod Trithan (THA)	2:14.99	
19	2	Muhammad Ahmed Durrani (PAK)	2:15.10	
20	3	Hamza Shalan (QAT)	2:15.53	
21	2	Abdulrahman Al-Kulaibi (OMA)	2:16.65	
22	3	Muhammad Amaan Siddiqui (PAK)	2:18.65	
23	4	Tögsmandakhyn Mönkh-Undraga (MGL)	2:25.29	
24	3	Amarsanaagiin Bilegt (MGL)	2:25.30	
25	2	Mubal Azzam Ibrahim (MDV)	2:27.09	
26	1	Kinley Lhendup (BHU)	2:27.84	
27	1	Ahmed Neeq Niyaz (MDV)	2:36.00	

=== Final ===
Rank	Athlete	Time	Notes
1st place, gold medalist(s)	Wang Shun (CHN)	1:54.62	AR
2nd place, silver medalist(s)	Qin Haiyang (CHN)	1:57.41	
3rd place, bronze medalist(s)	Daiya Seto (JPN)	1:58.35	
4	So Ogata (JPN)	1:59.69	
5	Kim Min-suk (KOR)	1:59.80	
6	Wang Hsing-hao (TPE)	2:00.15	
7	Zachary Tan (SGP)	2:02.94	
8	Maximillian Ang (SGP)	2:03.21	
