= Swimming at the 2014 Asian Games – Men's 400 metre individual medley =

Men's 400 metre individual medley at the 2014 Asian Games
- Venue: Munhak Park Tae-hwan Aquatics Center
- Date: 24 September 2014
- Competitors: 11 from 8 nations

Medalists
gold medal	Kosuke Hagino	Japan
silver medal	Yang Zhixian	China
bronze medal	Daiya Seto	Japan

The men's 400 metre individual medley event at the 2014 Asian Games took place on 24 September 2014 at Munhak Park Tae-hwan Aquatics Center.

== Schedule ==
All times are Korea Standard Time (UTC+09:00)

Date	Time	Event
Wednesday, 24 September 2014	09:00	Heats
Wednesday, 24 September 2014	19:57	Final

== Records ==
Prior to this competition, the existing world, Asian and Games records were as follows.

World Record	Michael Phelps (USA)	4:03.84	Beijing, China	10 August 2008
Asian Record	Kosuke Hagino (JPN)	4:07.61	Niigata, Japan	11 April 2013
Games Record	Yuya Horihata (JPN)	4:13.35	Guangzhou, China	13 November 2010

== Results ==
=== Heats ===
Rank	Heat	Athlete	Time	Notes
1	1	Daiya Seto (JPN)	4:15.94	
2	2	Kosuke Hagino (JPN)	4:18.77	
3	1	Huang Chaosheng (CHN)	4:19.13	
4	2	Yang Zhixian (CHN)	4:19.33	
5	2	Jung Won-yong (KOR)	4:26.18	
6	2	Trần Duy Khôi (VIE)	4:29.05	
7	2	Wen Ren-hau (TPE)	4:30.33	
8	1	Hsiao Fu-yu (TPE)	4:30.66	
9	1	Pang Sheng Jun (SIN)	4:35.84	
10	1	Ayman Klzie (SYR)	4:39.92	
11	2	Ahmed Al-Hashem (KSA)	5:12.11	

=== Final ===
Rank	Athlete	Time	Notes
1st place, gold medalist(s)	Kosuke Hagino (JPN)	4:07.75	GR
2nd place, silver medalist(s)	Yang Zhixian (CHN)	4:10.18	
3rd place, bronze medalist(s)	Daiya Seto (JPN)	4:10.39	
4	Huang Chaosheng (CHN)	4:10.49	
5	Wen Ren-hau (TPE)	4:24.02	
6	Jung Won-yong (KOR)	4:24.12	
7	Trần Duy Khôi (VIE)	4:24.54	
8	Hsiao Fu-yu (TPE)	4:29.29	
