= Hiromasa Fujimori =

Japanese swimmer (born 1991)

Personal information
- National team: Japan
- Born: August 7, 1991 (age 34)
- Height: 1.76 m (5 ft 9 in)
- Weight: 72 kg (159 lb)

Sport
- Sport: Swimming
- Strokes: Individual medley
Medal record
Men's swimming
Representing Japan
World Championships (SC)
Bronze medal – third place	2018 Hangzhou	200 m medley
Asian Games
Silver medal – second place	2014 Incheon	200 m medley
Summer Universiade
Silver medal – second place	2013 Kazan	200 m medley

Hiromasa Fujimori (藤森 太将, Fujimori Hiromasa; born 7 August 1991) is a Japanese competitive swimmer who specializes in individual medley.

He qualified for the 2016 Summer Olympics in Rio de Janeiro in the 200 meter individual medley after clearing the qualification time by 0.05 seconds. He finished 4th in the final, 0.16 seconds behind the bronze medalist.

Fujimori had his results at the 2018 World Short Course Championships from 14 December 2018 disqualified and served a 24 month suspension by FINA from January 2019 through December 2020 for an anti-doping rule violation on 14 December 2018 at the Championships.
