= Kosuke Hagino =

Japanese swimmer (born 1994)

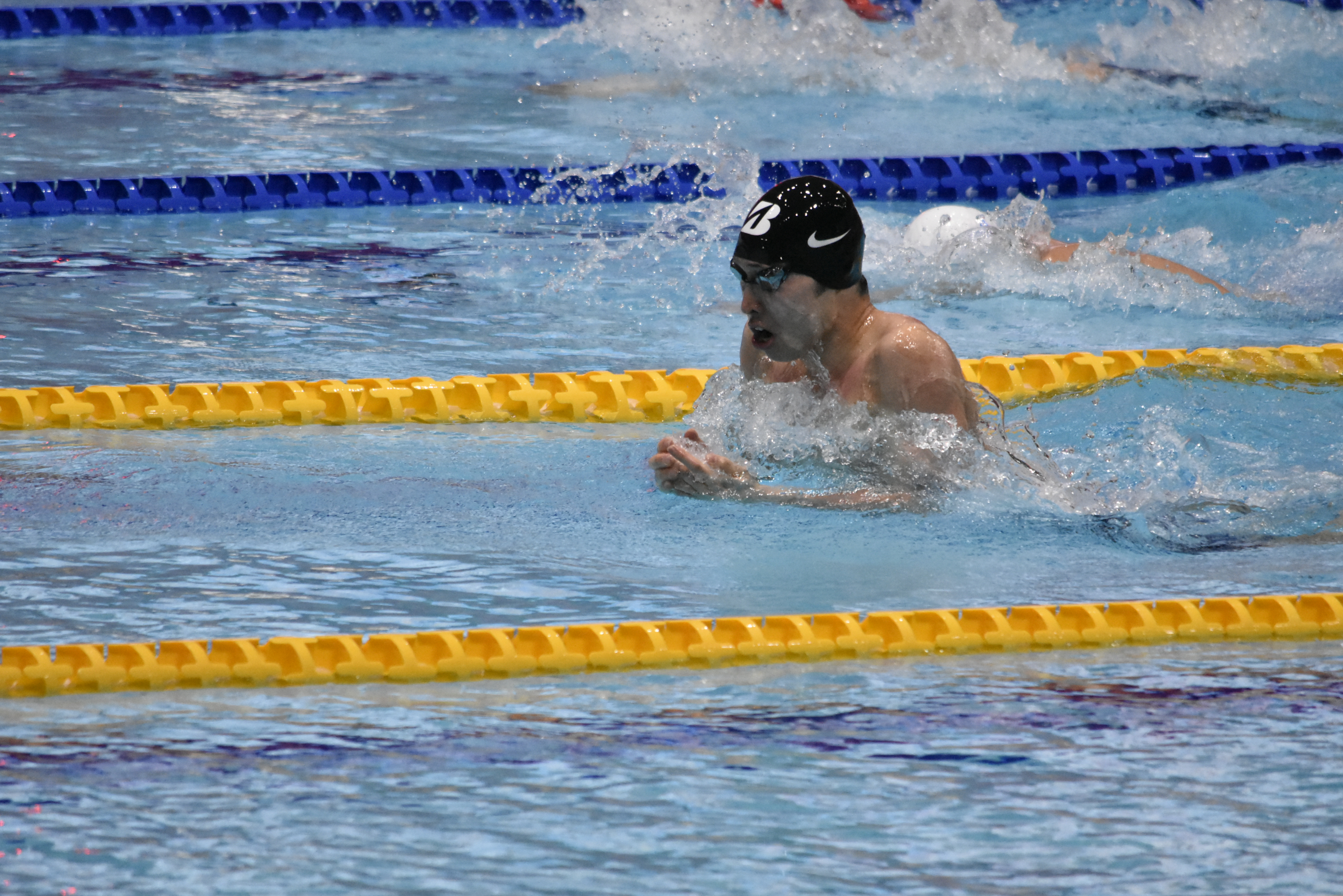

Personal information
- Nickname: Rising Son
- Born: 15 August 1994 (age 32) Oyama, Japan
- Height: 1.77 m (5 ft 10 in)
- Weight: 71 kg (157 lb)

Sport
- Sport: Swimming
- Strokes: Backstroke, freestyle, medley
- Club: Miyukigahara SS
- College team: Toyo University
Medal record
Men's swimming
Representing Japan
Event	1st	2nd	3rd
Olympic Games	1	1	2
World Championships (LC)	0	3	0
World Championships (SC)	1	1	0
Pan Pacific Championships	2	4	1
Asian Games	5	3	3
Total	9	12	6
Olympic Games
Gold medal – first place	2016 Rio de Janeiro	400 m medley
Silver medal – second place	2016 Rio de Janeiro	200 m medley
Bronze medal – third place	2012 London	400 m medley
Bronze medal – third place	2016 Rio de Janeiro	4×200 m freestyle
World Championships (LC)
Silver medal – second place	2013 Barcelona	400 m freestyle
Silver medal – second place	2013 Barcelona	200 m medley
Silver medal – second place	2017 Budapest	200 m medley
World Championships (SC)
Gold medal – first place	2014 Doha	200 m medley
Silver medal – second place	2014 Doha	400 m medley
Pan Pacific Championships
Gold medal – first place	2014 Gold Coast	200 m medley
Gold medal – first place	2014 Gold Coast	400 m medley
Silver medal – second place	2014 Gold Coast	200 m freestyle
Silver medal – second place	2014 Gold Coast	400 m freestyle
Silver medal – second place	2014 Gold Coast	4×200 m freestyle
Silver medal – second place	2018 Tokyo	400 m medley
Bronze medal – third place	2018 Tokyo	200 m medley
Asian Games
Gold medal – first place	2014 Incheon	200 m freestyle
Gold medal – first place	2014 Incheon	200 m medley
Gold medal – first place	2014 Incheon	400 m medley
Gold medal – first place	2014 Incheon	4×200 m freestyle
Gold medal – first place	2018 Jakarta	4×200 m freestyle
Silver medal – second place	2014 Incheon	400 m freestyle
Silver medal – second place	2018 Jakarta	200 m medley
Silver medal – second place	2018 Jakarta	400 m medley
Bronze medal – third place	2014 Incheon	100 m backstroke
Bronze medal – third place	2014 Incheon	200 m backstroke
Bronze medal – third place	2018 Jakarta	400 m freestyle
Summer Universiade
Gold medal – first place	2017 Taipei	200 m medley
Gold medal – first place	2017 Taipei	4×200 m freestyle
Silver medal – second place	2017 Taipei	400 m medley
Silver medal – second place	2017 Taipei	100 m backstroke
Bronze medal – third place	2017 Taipei	4×100 m medley
World Junior Championships
Gold medal – first place	2011 Lima	200 m medley
Silver medal – second place	2011 Lima	200 m backstroke
Silver medal – second place	2011 Lima	4×100 m medley
Bronze medal – third place	2011 Lima	400 m medley
Bronze medal – third place	2011 Lima	100 m backstroke

Kosuke Hagino (萩野公介, Hagino Kōsuke; born 15 August 1994) is a Japanese former competitive swimmer who specialized in the individual medley and 200 m freestyle. He is a four-time Olympic medalist, most notably winning gold in the 400 m individual medley at the 2016 Summer Olympics.

Hagino holds the Asian Records in the 400 m individual medley (long course), the 100 m and 200 m individual medley (short course). With Team Japan, he holds the Asian Record for the 4 × 100 m freestyle relay (short course).

Hagino attends Toyo University, and is coached by Norimasa Hirai. He is one of the only two Asians to have been voted World Swimmer of the Year.

== Background and personal ==
Kosuke Hagino was born in Tochigi, Tochigi, Japan on 15 August 1994.

He married the singer Miwa in 2019 fall and the couple has been expecting a child; its birth expected some time in 2019 winter. They divorced in March 2024.

== Career ==
=== Beginnings: 2012 Olympic Games ===
Hagino made his international breakthrough at the 2012 Olympics held in London. He qualified First in the 400 m individual medley heats with a new Asian record of 4:10.01, and would go on to win his first international medal with a bronze in the event and again lower his Asian record to a 4:08.94.

=== Rise to recognition: 2013 World Championships ===
Coming into the Championships Hagino had qualified for a full slate of events including the 200 m freestyle, 400 m freestyle, 100 m backstroke, 200 m backstroke, 200 m individual medley and the 400 m individual medley. In his first event the 400 m freestyle Hagino won his first silver medal at the World Championships medal with a new Japanese record of 3:44.82.

In the Finals of 200 m Freestyle, Hagino clocked a personal best time of 1:45.94; he came in 5th.

Nearly an hour later, he was swimming, this time in the Finals of the 100 m backstroke. He was placed seventh in 53.93, much slower than his National record of 53.10 (which would have won him a silver medal).

On day five, after qualifying for the final, Hagino won another silver medal in the 200 m individual medley. His time of 1:56.29 was about half a second off his Nationals time of 1:55.74; he won Silver. The following day, he led off his team, in the 4 × 200 m freestyle relay, and was able to take off a hundredth of a second off his 200 m free time from day three, swimming a 1:45.93. He was placed fifth in the 200 m backstroke final that night, finishing in 1:55.42.

On the final night of competition, despite being the favorite, Hagino was only able to manage fifth place, finishing in 4:10.77. Although only winning two medals in his seven events, he was the only swimmer at the meet to swim six individual events.

=== Breakthrough: 2014 Pan Pacific Championships and 2014 Asian Games ===
==== 2014 Pan Pacific Championships ====
On day one of the Pan Pacs in Gold Coast, Hagino swam in the 200m freestyle. Hagino swam fastest in the heats, with 1:46.60, besting second place Conor Dwyer by five hundredths of a second. He later shaved almost half a second off his heats timing in the 'A' final, bringing it down to 1:46.08, a tenth of a second behind Thomas Fraser-Holmes. Hagino would earn a silver, his first medal of the meet.

On day two, Hagino swam in the 400m individual medley in his first event of the day. Hagino again swam fastest in the heats with 4:11.48, around three tenths of a second faster than second place and long-time rival, fellow Japanese Daiya Seto. Hagino would again swim fastest in the 'A' final with 4:08.31 for his first gold and second medal of the meet. Hagino later swam in the 4 × 200 m freestyle relay as the lead, clocking 1:46.13, touching first for Japan in the first leg. Japan finished second to the U.S. with 7:05.30, settling for silver.

On day three, Hagino swam in the 400m freestyle. Hagino swam with a time of 3:48.92 in the heats, at fourth place. He then swam 3:44.56 in the 'A' final, finishing more than a second behind winner Park Tae-hwan. He earned his third silver and fourth medal of the meet. Hagino then swam in the 200m backstroke, where he qualified fifth with 1:56.94. He finished last in the 'A' final, where he surprisingly swam almost three seconds slower than his heats timing. It would be Hagino's only medal-less event.

On day four and Hagino's final event, he swam in the 200m individual medley that featured a competitive field including teammate Seto and American legends Michael Phelps, Ryan Lochte and Tyler Clary. Hagino swam fastest in the heats with a 1:57.61, besting second place Seto by more than a half a second. He again swam fastest in the 'A' final, swimming 1:56.62, narrowly out-touching Phelps by two hundredths of a second. He earned his second gold of the meet.

Hagino earned medals in five of his six events. He won two gold and three silver medals.

==== 2014 Asian Games ====
On the first day of the Asiad in Incheon, Hagino swam in the 200m freestyle that featured Asia's best with Asian Record holder Sun Yang and Games Record holder Park Tae-hwan. He clocked 1:48.99 for second place in the heats, nine hundredths of a second behind Sun. In the final, Hagino shaved off more than two seconds off his heats timing, swimming 1:45.23 for his first gold medal of the Games. Hagino then swam in the 100m backstroke, clocking the third fastest time in the heats with 54.86. In the final, he swam almost a second faster for a bronze, and his second medal of the games.

On Day Two, Hagino swam in the 200m individual medley, which he holds the Asian Record of 1:55.33. He surprisingly swam third in the heats, clocking 2:00.85. In the final, he missed his own Asian Record by one hundredth of a second, but set a new Games Record. It was his second gold of the Games. Hagino later swam in the 4 × 200 m freestyle relay, which Japan held the Asian Record of 7:02.26. He swam a split of 1:44.97, the fastest split of any swimmer in the relay. Japan would then fail to beat their record, however set a new Games Record of 7:06.74 for the gold medal.

On day three, Hagino swam in the 400m freestyle than again featured Asian Record holder Sun and Games Record holder Park. He qualified second with 3:52.24 in the heats, and brought his time down to 3:44.48, but again finished second to Sun. He earned his first silver of the Games.

On day four, Hagino swam in the 400m individual medley, which he holds the Asian Record of 4:07.61. He finished second to prime rival Seto in the heats, swimming 4:18.77, around two seconds slower. Hagino then swam close to his personal best with 4:07.75 in the final, failing to beat his Asian Record but setting a new Games Record. It was his fourth gold medal.

On day five and Hagino's final event, he swam in the 200m backstroke, and qualified fourth in the heats with 2:00.34. He managed to win bronze in the final, swimming 1:56.36.

Hagino swam seven-for-seven, earning four golds, a silver and three bronze medals. He was announced as the Most Valuable Player (MVP).

Hagino was also World Swimmer of the Year, and is the first and only Japanese to earn the award.

=== Continued Success: 2016 Olympic Games ===
Hagino competed in his second Olympic games at the 2016 Olympics held in Rio de Janeiro. He qualified third in the heats and went on to win gold for the 400 m individual medley, breaking his own Asian record with a time of 4:06.05 and winning Japan's first-ever gold for this event. Hagino won silver in the 200 m individual medley, becoming the first Asian man (along with Wang Shun) to medal at the event, and bronze in the 4 × 200 m freestyle relay.

=== Retirement: 2020 Olympic Games ===
Hagino decided not to defend his 400 m individual medley title at the 2020 Olympics held in Tokyo in 2021. He finished sixth in the 200 m individual medley event. On 24 August 2021, it was reported that he has informed his team of his decision to retire and is contemplating attending graduate school.

=== Personal bests (long course) ===
As of 8 August 2016

Event	Time	Meet	Venue	Date	Note(s)
100 m freestyle	48.75	All Japan Intercollegiate Swimming Championships 2014	Kanagawa, Japan	5 September 2014	
200 m freestyle	1:45.23	Asian Games 2014	Incheon, South Korea	21 September 2014	Former NR
400 m freestyle	3:43.90	Japan Swim 2014	Tokyo, Japan	12 April 2014	NR
100 m backstroke	52.78	All Japan Intercollegiate Swimming Championships 2014	Kanagawa, Japan	6 September 2014	
200 m backstroke	1:54.23	Japan Swim 2014	Tokyo, Japan	25 January 2014	
200 m medley	1:55.07	Japan Swim 2016	Tokyo, Japan	9 April 2016	NR
400 m medley	4:06.05	Olympic Games 2016	Brazil	6 August 2016	AS

Awards
Preceded by (China) Sun Yang	World Swimmer of the Year; 2014	Succeeded by (United Kingdom) Adam Peaty
Preceded by (China) Sun Yang (Australia) Mitch Larkin	Pacific Rim Swimmer of the Year; 2014; 2016	Succeeded by (Australia) Mitch Larkin; Incumbent
