= Daiya Seto =

Japanese swimmer (born 1994)

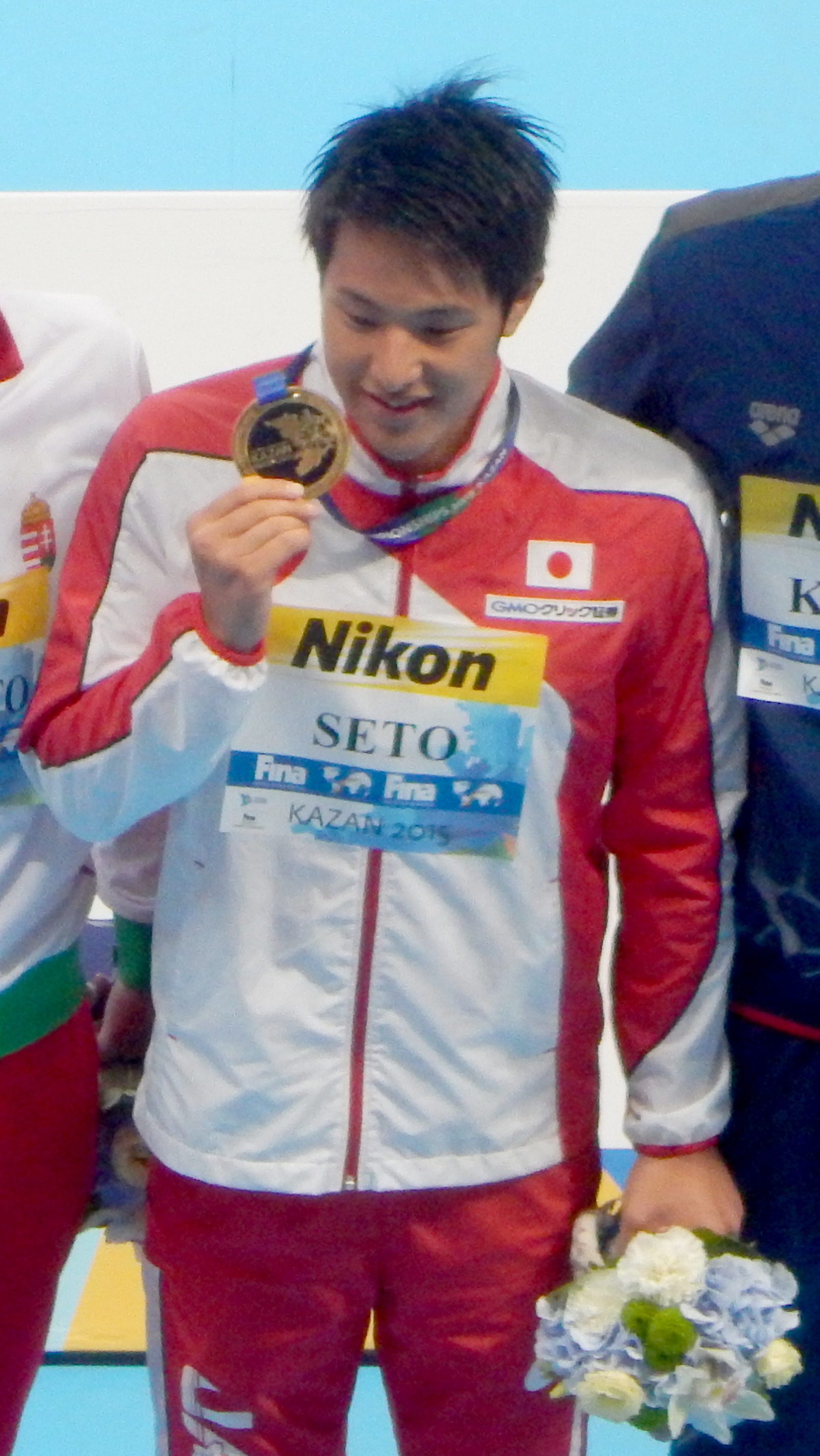
- Seto at the 2015 World Championships

Personal information
- National team: Japan
- Born: 24 May 1994 (age 32) Moroyama, Saitama, Japan
- Height: 1.74 m (5 ft 9 in)
- Weight: 75 kg (165 lb)

Sport
- Sport: Swimming
- Strokes: Butterfly, individual medley
- Club: Energy Standard; JSS Moroyama
- College team: Waseda University
- Coach: Takayuki Umehara (club); Norimasa Hirai
Medal record
Men's swimming
Representing Japan
Olympic Games
Bronze medal – third place	2016 Rio de Janeiro	400 m medley
World Championships (LC)
Gold medal – first place	2013 Barcelona	400 m medley
Gold medal – first place	2015 Kazan	400 m medley
Gold medal – first place	2019 Gwangju	200 m medley
Gold medal – first place	2019 Gwangju	400 m medley
Silver medal – second place	2019 Gwangju	200 m butterfly
Bronze medal – third place	2017 Budapest	200 m butterfly
Bronze medal – third place	2017 Budapest	400 m medley
Bronze medal – third place	2022 Budapest	200 m medley
Bronze medal – third place	2023 Fukuoka	400 m medley
Bronze medal – third place	2024 Doha	400 m medley
World Championships (SC)
Gold medal – first place	2012 Istanbul	400 m medley
Gold medal – first place	2014 Doha	400 m medley
Gold medal – first place	2016 Windsor	400 m medley
Gold medal – first place	2018 Hangzhou	200 m butterfly
Gold medal – first place	2018 Hangzhou	400 m medley
Gold medal – first place	2021 Abu Dhabi	200 m medley
Gold medal – first place	2021 Abu Dhabi	400 m medley
Gold medal – first place	2022 Melbourne	200 m breaststroke
Gold medal – first place	2022 Melbourne	400 m medley
Silver medal – second place	2012 Istanbul	200 m medley
Silver medal – second place	2014 Doha	200 m butterfly
Silver medal – second place	2016 Windsor	100 m medley
Silver medal – second place	2016 Windsor	4×200 m freestyle
Silver medal – second place	2022 Melbourne	200 m butterfly
Bronze medal – third place	2014 Doha	200 m medley
Bronze medal – third place	2016 Windsor	200 m butterfly
Bronze medal – third place	2016 Windsor	200 m medley
Pan Pacific Championships
Gold medal – first place	2014 Gold Coast	200 m butterfly
Gold medal – first place	2018 Tokyo	200 m butterfly
Bronze medal – third place	2018 Tokyo	400 m medley
Bronze medal – third place	2014 Gold Coast	200 m medley
Asian Games
Gold medal – first place	2014 Incheon	200 m butterfly
Gold medal – first place	2014 Incheon	4×200 m freestyle
Gold medal – first place	2018 Jakarta	200 m butterfly
Gold medal – first place	2018 Jakarta	400 m medley
Silver medal – second place	2022 Hangzhou	400 m medley
Bronze medal – third place	2014 Incheon	400 m medley
Bronze medal – third place	2022 Hangzhou	200 m medley
Asian Championships
Gold medal – first place	2016 Tokyo	400 m medley
Gold medal – first place	2016 Tokyo	4×200 m freestyle
Silver medal – second place	2016 Tokyo	200 m butterfly
Silver medal – second place	2016 Tokyo	200 m medley
Summer Universiade
Gold medal – first place	2017 Taipei	400 m medley
Gold medal – first place	2017 Taipei	4×200 m freestyle
Silver medal – second place	2017 Taipei	200 m medley
Silver medal – second place	2017 Taipei	200 m butterfly
Junior Pan Pacific Championships
Gold medal – first place	2012 Honolulu	4×200 m freestyle
Gold medal – first place	2012 Honolulu	4×100 m medley
Silver medal – second place	2012 Honolulu	200 m freestyle
Silver medal – second place	2012 Honolulu	100 m butterfly
Silver medal – second place	2012 Honolulu	200 m medley
Bronze medal – third place	2012 Honolulu	4×100 m freestyle

Daiya Seto (瀬戸 大也, Seto Daiya; born 24 May 1994) is a Japanese professional swimmer who specializes in individual medley, butterfly, breaststroke, and freestyle events. He holds the world record in the short course 400-metre individual medley and formerly held the world record in the short course 200-metre butterfly. He won the gold medal in the 400-metre individual medley at the 2012, 2014, 2016, 2018, 2021, and 2022 world short course championships, as well as at the 2013, 2015, and 2019 world long course championships.

== Swimming career ==
Seto took up swimming at the age of five. He narrowly missed the 2012 Japan Olympic Team when he finished third in both the 200-metre and 400-metre individual medley events at the national selection meet. He improved his times at the 2012 FINA Swimming World Cup, where he competed at all stops of the World Cup circuit and achieved a fourth-place finish across all stops. He concluded the year's short course season at the 2012 World Short Course Championships. Here Seto won the first international medals of his career. He first competed in the 400-metre individual medley, where he won his first world title in a new Asian record of 3:59.12, over a second and a half faster than second-place finisher László Cseh. He then competed in the 200-metre individual medley, where he was able to sprint past Cseh for the silver medal in a time of 1:52.80.

=== 2013 World Championships ===
Seto was still coming into the 2013 World Aquatics Championships in Barcelona, Spain, relatively unknown. He swam both individual medley events. In the 200-metre, his first event, he swam a personal best in the semifinals with a time of 1:58.03, and then finished a touch slower in the final the next night to finish seventh overall. In his best event of the Championships, the 400-metre individual medley, Seto qualified first for the final and then won his first long course world title by finishing first in a time of 4:08.69, about half a second ahead of second-place finisher Chase Kalisz of the United States. Seto became the second-fastest Asian performer in the event, behind Hagino, with his time.

=== 2014 Pan Pacific Championships ===
During the 2014 Pan Pacific Swimming Championships Seto won a gold medal.

=== 2015 World Championships ===
Seto successfully defended his world title in the 400-metre individual medley on the last day of the 2015 World Aquatics Championships in Kazan, Russia. Earlier in the meet, he did not live up to the expectations of others in the 200-metre butterfly and 200-metre individual medley, events in which he was ranked second in the world before leading up to the Championships.

=== 2016 Summer Olympics ===
Seto earned a bronze medal in the 400-metre individual medley on 6 August, with a time of 4:09.71 in the final of the event at the 2016 Summer Olympics in Rio de Janeiro, Brazil. He also finished fifth in the 200-metre butterfly.

=== 2018 Pan Pacific Championships ===
In 2018 he won a gold medal at the 2018 Pan Pacific Swimming Championships.

=== 2018 World Short Course Championships ===
At the 2018 World Swimming Championships conducted in short course metres in Hangzhou, China in December, Seto won the gold medal in the 200-metre butterfly with a time of 1:48.24 that set a new world record in the event.

Seto was named "Male Asian Swimmer of the Year" by SwimSwam for the 2018 year.

=== 2019 International Swimming League ===
In the autumn of 2019, he was a member of the inaugural season of the International Swimming League, swimming for the Energy Standard Swim Club. His club won the team title in Las Vegas, United States, in December. At the final match in Las Vegas, Seto set a new world record in the 400-metre individual medley with a time of 3:54.81, breaking the former record set by Ryan Lochte of the United States. Also in Las Vegas, he won the 200-metre butterfly over teammate Chad le Clos of South Africa, and the 200-metre individual medley.

=== 2020 FINA Champions Swim Series ===
At the Beijing, China stop of the 2020 FINA Champions Swim Series in January, Seto set a new Asian record and Japan national record in the long course 200-metre butterfly with a time of 1:52.53, which put him only behind the world record holder in the event, Kristóf Milák of Hungary, and a former world record holder in the event, Michael Phelps of the United States, in terms of global rankings up to that point in time.

=== 2020 Summer Olympics ===
He competed in his second Olympic Games at the 2020 Summer Olympics in Tokyo, Japan. He finished in fourth place in the 200-metre individual medley final, and did not qualify for 400-metre individual medley final.

=== 2021 FINA Swimming World Cup ===
At the 2021 FINA Swimming World Cup stop in Doha, Qatar, Seto won the highest-scoring overall male award and prize money for the stop with his gold medal wins in the 200-metre breaststroke and 400-metre individual medley on the third and final day of competition in Doha contributing to his overall high score. The same day Seto was announced overall male winner for the Doha stop, SwimSwam revealed he had officially become a professional swimmer.

==== Stop 4: Kazan ====
2021 World Cup – Kazan
Gold medal – first place	100 m individual medley	51.29 (AS)
Gold medal – first place	200 m individual medley	1:50.66 (WC)
Gold medal – first place	400 m individual medley	3:57.85
Gold medal – first place	200 m breaststroke	2:01.49

On the first day of competition, 28 October, at the fourth and final stop of the World Cup circuit, held in the Palace of Water Sports in Kazan, Russia, Seto set new Asian and Japanese records in the 100-metre individual medley with a time 51.29 seconds. His swim in the final improved upon his time of 51.64 seconds from the morning prelims heats. The next day, Seto swam a 1:54.03 in the prelims heats of the 200-metre individual medley, ranking first by over one full second ahead of the next fastest competitor for the heats, Matthew Sates of South Africa who swam a 1:55.37. In the final, Seto finished first and won the gold medal with a World Cup record and personal best time of 1:50.66. Seto snuck into the final of the 200-metre breaststroke on the last day of competition of the 2021 World Cup circuit, ranking fifth overall with a time of 2:05.83 in the prelims heats. In the evening finals session, he started off by winning the gold medal in the 400-metre individual medley with a time of 3:57.85. For the 200-metre breaststroke final, Seto won the gold medal with a time of 2:01.49. His swims for the Kazan stop earned him 58.9 points, which was the highest total score by any competitor for a single stop of the World Cup circuit with the next highest scoring competitors being female swimmers Emma McKeon of Australia, who earned 58.3 points at two stops, and Kira Toussaint of the Netherlands, who earned 58.3 points at one stop. He also ranked ninth for total number of medals won by a male competitor across the circuit, winning only gold medals, that is all eight of his medals were gold medals. The moment when Seto set a new World Cup record in the 200-metre individual medley was ranked as the number seven moment from the 2021 Swimming World Cup by FINA.

=== 2021 World Short Course Championships ===
2021 World Championships (SC)
Gold medal – first place	200 m individual medley	1:51.15
Gold medal – first place	400 m individual medley	3:56.26

In December 2021, Seto was announced as one of two swimmers from Japan to represent the country in competition at the 2021 World Short Course Championships in Abu Dhabi, United Arab Emirates. Starting his competition with the 200-metre individual medley on day one, he qualified for the final ranking first with a time of 1:52.38. In the evening final, he won the gold medal with a time of 1:51.15, finishing two-tenths of a second ahead of silver medalist Carson Foster of the United States. The third day of competition, he ranked first in the prelims heats of the 100-metre individual medley, qualifying for the semifinals with his time of 51.52 seconds. In the semifinals, he qualified for the final ranking third behind Kliment Kolesnikov of Russia and Tomoe Hvas of Norway with a time of 51.52 seconds. Seto placed fourth in the final, finishing six-hundredths of a second behind bronze medalist Thomas Ceccon of Italy with a time of 51.46 seconds. Day five of competition, he ranked first in the prelims heats of the 400-metre individual medley, qualifying for the final over one second faster than second-ranked Carson Foster with a time of 4:00.84. In the final in the evening, he won the gold medal with a time of 3:56.26.

=== 2022 World Short Course Championships ===
2022 World Championships (SC)
Gold medal – first place	200 m breaststroke	2:00.35 (AS)
Gold medal – first place	400 m individual medley	3:55.75
Silver medal – second place	200 m butterfly	1:49.22

At the 2022 World Short Course Championships, at Melbourne Sports and Aquatic Centre in Melbourne, Australia in December, Seto started off with a fifth-place finish in the 200-metre individual medley on day one with a time of 1:51.39. Two days later, he won the silver medal in the final of the 200-metre butterfly, finishing 0.95 seconds behind gold medalist Chad le Clos in a time of 1:49.22. On the fourth day, he competed in the 200-metre breaststroke for the first time at a World Short Course Championships, winning the gold medal with an Asian record time of 2:00.35, which was over one full second faster than silver medalist Nic Fink of the United States. The following day, he won a sixth-consecutive gold medal and world title in the final of the 400-metre individual medley, finishing in a time of 3:55.75, which was 1.88 seconds faster than second-place finisher Carson Foster and 3.46 seconds faster than third-place finisher Matthew Sates. It marked the first time at the World Short Course Championships that a swimmer won six-consecutive gold medals in any one event.

== International championships (50 m) ==
Meet	200 free	100 back	50 breast	100 fly	200 fly	200 medley	400 medley	4×100 free	4×200 free	4×100 medley
Junior level
PACJ 2012	2nd place, silver medalist(s)		—N/a	2nd place, silver medalist(s)		2nd place, silver medalist(s)	DSQ	3rd place, bronze medalist(s)	1st place, gold medalist(s)	1st place, gold medalist(s)
Senior level
WC 2013						7th	1st place, gold medalist(s)		5th^{[a]}	
PAC 2014			—N/a		1st place, gold medalist(s)	3rd place, bronze medalist(s)	5th			
AG 2014					1st place, gold medalist(s)		3rd place, bronze medalist(s)		1st place, gold medalist(s)	
WC 2015					6th	14th	1st place, gold medalist(s)		9th	
OG 2016			—N/a		5th		3rd place, bronze medalist(s)			
AC 2016		9th			2nd place, silver medalist(s)	2nd place, silver medalist(s)	1st place, gold medalist(s)		1st place, gold medalist(s)	
WC 2017					3rd place, bronze medalist(s)	5th	3rd place, bronze medalist(s)			
WUG 2017					2nd place, silver medalist(s)	2nd place, silver medalist(s)	1st place, gold medalist(s)		(gold) ^{[a]}	
PAC 2018			—N/a		1st place, gold medalist(s)	4th	3rd place, bronze medalist(s)			
AG 2018			8th		1st place, gold medalist(s)	4th	1st place, gold medalist(s)			
WC 2019					2nd place, silver medalist(s)	1st place, gold medalist(s)	1st place, gold medalist(s)		9th	
OG 2020			—N/a		11th	4th	9th			
WC 2022						3rd place, bronze medalist(s)	6th			
WC 2023						6th	3rd place, bronze medalist(s)			
AG 2022						3rd place, bronze medalist(s)	2nd place, silver medalist(s)			
WC 2024						4th				

^{a} Seto swam only in the preliminaries.

== International championships (25 m) ==
Meet	200 free	200 breast	100 fly	200 fly	100 medley	200 medley	400 medley	4×200 free
WC 2012					8th	2nd place, silver medalist(s)	1st place, gold medalist(s)	6th
WC 2014				2nd place, silver medalist(s)		3rd place, bronze medalist(s)	1st place, gold medalist(s)	
WC 2016	15th		18th	3rd place, bronze medalist(s)	2nd place, silver medalist(s)	3rd place, bronze medalist(s)	1st place, gold medalist(s)	2nd place, silver medalist(s)
WC 2018				1st place, gold medalist(s)			1st place, gold medalist(s)	DSQ
WC 2021					4th	1st place, gold medalist(s)	1st place, gold medalist(s)	
WC 2022		1st place, gold medalist(s)		2nd place, silver medalist(s)		5th	1st place, gold medalist(s)	

== Career best times ==
=== Long course metres (50 m pool) ===
As of 12 October 2021

Event	Time	Meet	Location	Date	Note(s)
100 m breaststroke	59.79	2019 Japan Open	Tokyo, Japan	30 May 2019	
100 m butterfly	51.89	2020 Kosuke Kitajima Cup	Tokyo, Japan	26 January 2020	
200 m butterfly	1:52.53	FINA Champions Swim Series	Beijing, China	18 January 2020	AS
200 m individual medley	1:55.55	FINA Champions Swim Series	Beijing, China	18 January 2020	
400 m individual medley	4:06.09	2020 Kosuke Kitajima Cup	Tokyo, Japan	25 January 2020	

=== Short course metres (25 m pool) ===
As of 30 December 2022

Event	Time	Meet	Location	Date	Note(s)
200 m breaststroke	2:00.35	2022 World Swimming Championships	Melbourne, Australia	16 December 2022	AS
200 m butterfly	1:48.24	2018 World Swimming Championships	Hangzhou, China	11 December 2018	Former WR
100 m individual medley	51.29	2021 FINA Swimming World Cup	Kazan, Russia	28 October 2021	AS
200 m individual medley	1:50.66	2021 FINA Swimming World Cup	Kazan, Russia	29 October 2021	
400 m individual medley	3:54.81	2019 International Swimming League	Las Vegas, United States	20 December 2019	WR

== World records ==
=== Short course metres ===
Event	Time	Meet	Location	Date	Status	Age	Ref
200 m butterfly	1:48.24	2018 World Swimming Championships	Hangzhou, China	11 December 2018	Former	24	
400 m individual medley	3:54.81	2019 International Swimming League	Las Vegas, United States	20 December 2019	Current	25	

== Continental and national records ==
=== Long course metres ===
Event	Time	Meet	Location	Date	Type	Status	Age	Ref
200 m butterfly	1:52.53	2020 FINA Champions Swim Series	Beijing, China	18 January 2020	AS, NR	Current	25	

Legend: AS – Asian record; NR – Japanese record; e – equalled existing record;
Records not set in finals: h – heat; sf – semifinal; r – relay 1st leg; rh – relay heat 1st leg; b – B final; † – en route to final mark; so – swim-off; tt – time trial

=== Short course metres ===
Event	Time	Meet	Location	Date	Type	Status	Age	Notes	Ref
200 m butterfly	1:48.24	2018 World Swimming Championships	Hangzhou, China	11 December 2018	AS, NR	Former	24	Former WR	
400 m individual medley	3:54.81	2019 International Swimming League	Las Vegas, United States	20 December 2019	AS, NR	Current	25	WR	
100 m individual medley	51.29	2021 FINA Swimming World Cup	Kazan, Russia	28 October 2021	AS, NR	Current	27		
200 m breaststroke	2:00.35	2022 World Swimming Championships	Melbourne, Australia	16 December 2022	AS, NR	Current	28		

Legend: WR – World record; AS – Asian record; NR – Japanese record; e – equalled existing record;
Records not set in finals: h – heat; sf – semifinal; r – relay 1st leg; rh – relay heat 1st leg; b – B final; † – en route to final mark; so – swim-off; tt – time trial

== Awards and honours ==
- FINA Top 10 Moments: 2021 Swimming World Cup (#7)
- SwimSwam Top 100 (Men's): 2021 (#4), 2022 (#6)
- SwimSwam Swammy Award, Asian Swimmer of the Year (male): 2018, 2019

== Personal life ==
Daiya Seto was married to Yuka Mabuchi and has a daughter named Yuwa.

In September 2020, it was reported by The Japan Times, Yahoo!, and The Washington Post that Seto was involved in an extramarital affair. Seto apologised and resigned from his position as captain of the Japan Olympic Swim Team.

== See also ==
- List of World Aquatics Championships medalists in swimming (men)
- List of World Swimming Championships (25 m) medalists (men)

Records
Preceded by (South Africa) Chad le Clos	Men's 200 metre butterfly world record holder (short course); 11 December 2018 – 22 October 2022	Succeeded by (Japan) Tomoru Honda
Preceded by (United States) Ryan Lochte	Men's 400 metre individual medley world record holder (short course); 20 December 2019 – present	Succeeded by Incumbent
