= Wang Hsing-hao =

Taiwanese swimmer (born 1999)

Personal information
- National team: Chinese Taipei
- Born: 5 June 1999 (age 27) Taichung, Taiwan

Sport
- Sport: Swimming
Medal record
Men's swimming
Representing Chinese Taipei
Asian Championships
Silver medal – second place	2025 Ahmedabad	200 m medley
Silver medal – second place	2025 Ahmedabad	4x100 m medley
Silver medal – second place	2025 Ahmedabad	4x100 m freestyle
Summer Universiade
Silver medal – second place	2021 Chengdu	200 m medley
Bronze medal – third place	2019 Naples	200 m medley

Wang Hsing-hao (born 5 June 1999) is a Taiwanese swimmer. In 2019, he represented Chinese Taipei at the 2019 World Aquatics Championships held in Gwangju, South Korea.

In 2018, he represented Chinese Taipei at the 2018 Asian Games held in Jakarta, Indonesia. He competed in the men's 200 metre individual medley and men's 400 metre individual medley events. He also competed in the men's 4 × 200 metre freestyle relay event.

In 2019, he won the bronze medal in the men's 200 metre individual medley event at the 2019 Summer Universiade in Naples, Italy.
