= List of Macedonian records in swimming =

The Macedonian Records in Swimming are the fastest times ever swum by a swimmer representing North Macedonia. These records are kept/maintained by the National Swimming Federation of North Macedonia.

Records are recognized for the following long course (50m) and short course (25m) events:

- freestyle: 50, 100, 200, 400, 800 and 1500;
- backstroke: 50, 100 and 200;
- breaststroke: 50, 100 and 200;
- butterfly: 50, 100 and 200;
- individual medley (I.M.): 100 (25m only), 200 and 400;
- relays: 4x50 free (25m only), 4x100 free, 4x200 free, 4x50 medley (25m only) and 4 × 100 medley.

All records were set in finals unless noted otherwise.

== Long Course (50m) ==
=== Men ===
Event	Time		Name	Club	Date	Meet	Location	Ref
50 m freestyle	23.09	=	Jovan Jankovski	PK Vardar 2018	20 December 2025	XXXIV Sveti Nikola	Niš, Serbia	
50 m freestyle	23.09	=	Jovan Jankovski	PK Vardar 2018	17 May 2026	Grand Prix Burgas	Burgas, Bulgaria	
100 m freestyle	50.36		Jovan Jankovski	PK Vardar 2018	21 December 2025	XXXIV Sveti Nikola	Niš, Serbia	
200 m freestyle	1:52.59	h	Nikola Ǵuretanoviḱ	Macedonia	13 August 2026	European Championships	Paris, France	
400 m freestyle	3:57.75		Nikola Ǵuretanoviḱ	Macedonia	22 December 2024	XXXIII Sveti Nikola	Niš, Serbia	
800 m freestyle	8:15.69		Nikola Ǵuretanoviḱ	Macedonia	15 March 2025	Otvoreno prvenstvo Srbije	Novi Sad, Serbia	
1500 m freestyle	15:44.97		Nikola Ǵuretanoviḱ	Macedonia	21 December 2024	XXXIII Sveti Nikola	Niš, Serbia	
50 m backstroke	27.35	h	Andrej Stojanovski	North Macedonia	29 July 2023	World Championships	Fukuoka, Japan	
100 m backstroke	59.45	not ratified	Marko Blaževski	Macedonia	15 July 2016	Speedo ESSZ Senior Sectionals	Greensboro, United States	
200 m backstroke	2:08.66	h	Gorazd Chepishevski	Macedonia	22 June 2013	Mediterranean Games	Mersin, Turkey	
50 m breaststroke	28.96	sf, not ratified	Marko Blaževski	Macedonia	14 June 2018	Charlotte UltraSwim	Charlotte, United States	
100 m breaststroke	1:02.88	h	Marko Blaževski	North Macedonia	25 May 2019	Banja Luka Open	Banja Luka, Bosnia and Herzegovina	
200 m breaststroke	2:16.48	tt	Marko Blaževski	SwimMAC Carolina	13 December 2015	Speedo Winter Juniors East Time Trial	Atlanta, United States	
50m butterfly	24.84		Jovan Jankovski	PK Vardar 2018	17 May 2026	Grand Prix Burgas	Burgas, Bulgaria	
100m butterfly	55.11	h	Aleksandar Miladinovski	(North Macedonia) Macedonia	2 August 2002	European Championships	Berlin, Germany	
200m butterfly	2:00.57		Aleksandar Malenko	(North Macedonia) Macedonia	7 August 1996	European Junior Championships	Copenhagen, Denmark	
200m individual medley	2:02.54	h, not ratified	Marko Blaževski	Macedonia	10 August 2016	Olympic Games	Rio de Janeiro, Brazil	
400m individual medley	4:23.51		Marko Blaževski	Macedonia	28 March 2014	Speedo Championship Series	Buffalo, United States	
4x100m freestyle relay	3:37.71	h	M. Blaževski (54.65); M. Stefanovski (54.91); T. Jankovski (54.74); B. Jovanov (53.41)	(North Macedonia) Macedonia	15 August 2011	World University Games	Shenzhen, China	
4x200m freestyle relay	8:20.17							
4x100m medley relay	4:08.27			(North Macedonia) Macedonia	10 July 2011			

Legend: # – Record awaiting ratification by Swimming Federation of Macedonia;
Records not set in finals: h – heat; sf – semifinal; r – relay 1st leg; rh – relay heat 1st leg; b – B final; † – en route to final mark; so – swim-off; tt – time trial

=== Women ===
Event	Time		Name	Club	Date	Meet	Location	Ref
50 m freestyle	26.34		Anastasia Bogdanovski	Macedonia	29 June 2014	Quebec Cup	Quebec City, Canada	
50 m freestyle	26.23	not ratified	Anastasia Bogdanovski	Macedonia	6 August 2017	Senior Zone Championship	Buffalo, United States	
100 m freestyle	56.12	h	Anastasia Bogdanovski	Macedonia	6 August 2015	World Championships	Kazan, Russia	
200 m freestyle	2:01.28	h	Anastasia Bogdanovski	Macedonia	4 August 2015	World Championships	Kazan, Russia	
200 m freestyle	2:00.52	h, not ratified	Anastasia Bogdanovski	Macedonia	8 August 2016	Olympic Games	Rio de Janeiro, Brazil	
400 m freestyle	4:17.52		Vesna Stojanovska	Macedonia	20 July 2003	World Championships	Barcelona, Spain	
800 m freestyle	8:46.39	h	Mirjana Bosevska	Macedonia	21 September 2000	Olympic Games	Sydney, Australia	
1500 m freestyle	17:35.18	h, not ratified	Eva Petrovska	North Macedonia	22 July 2019	World Championships	Gwangju, South Korea	
50m backstroke	30.54 (Note: by official result source; 30.44 by national federation source)	h	Mia Blaževska Eminova	North Macedonia	9 July 2021	European Junior Championships	Rome, Italy	
100m backstroke	1:04.11	h	Mia Blaževska Eminova	North Macedonia	19 June 2022	World Championships	Budapest, Hungary	
200m backstroke	2:18.02		Mia Krstevska	PVK Orion	15 February 2020	VI Dubocica Open	Leskovac, Serbia	
50m breaststroke	33.74		Sara Jankovik	-		-		
100m breaststroke	1:15.98		Monika Spasovska	-		-		
200m breaststroke	2:42.39		Vesna Trajkovska	-		-		
50m butterfly	28.42	h	Mia Blaževska Eminova	Macedonia	28 June 2025	European U23 Championships	Šamorín, Slovakia	
100m butterfly	1:02.86 (Note: by official result and World Aquatics sources; 1:02.36 by national federation source)	h	Vesna Stojanovska	Macedonia	13 May 2004	European Championships	Madrid, Spain	
200m butterfly	2:12.59		Mirjana Bosevska	Macedonia	19 September 2000	Olympic Games	Sydney, Australia	
200m individual medley	2:16.09	sf	Mirjana Bosevska	Macedonia	31 July 2002	European Championships	Berlin, Germany	
400m individual medley	4:46.42		Mirjana Bosevska	Macedonia	29 July 2002	European Championships	Berlin, Germany	
4x100m freestyle relay	4:18.98			Macedonia		-		
4x200m freestyle relay	9:30.69			PK Delfin		-		
4x100m medley relay	4:50.40			Macedonia		-		

Legend: # – Record awaiting ratification by Swimming Federation of Macedonia; WR – World record; ER – European record;
Records not set in finals: h – heat; sf – semifinal; r – relay 1st leg; rh – relay heat 1st leg; b – B final; † – en route to final mark; so – swim-off; tt – time trial

== Short Course (25m) ==
=== Men ===
Event	Time		Name	Club	Date	Meet	Location	Ref
50 m freestyle	22.52		Jovan Jankovksi	PK Vardar 2018	13 December 2025	Macedonian Winter Championships	Skopje, North Macedonia	
100 m freestyle	49.24		Jovan Jankovksi	PK Vardar 2018	29 November 2025	Skopje Open	Skopje, North Macedonia	
200 m freestyle	1:49.80	h	Marko Blaževski	Macedonia	3 December 2014	World Championships	Doha, Qatar	
400 m freestyle	3:53.05	h	Nikola Ǵuretanoviḱ	Macedonia	12 December 2024	World Championships	Budapest, Hungary	
800 m freestyle	8:06.79		Nikola Ǵuretanoviḱ	Macedonia	14 December 2024	World Championships	Budapest, Hungary	
1500 m freestyle	15:35.89		Petar Cekov	PK Vardar 2018	12 December 2025	Macedonian Winter Championships	Skopje, North Macedonia	
50m backstroke	25.59		Jovan Jankovksi	PK Vardar 2018	13 December 2025	Macedonian Winter Championships	Skopje, North Macedonia	
100m backstroke	55.98	h	Gorazd Chepisevski	Macedonia	6 December 2016	World Championships	Windsor, Canada	
200m backstroke	2:02.35	h	Gorazd Chepisevski	Macedonia	11 December 2016	World Championships	Windsor, Canada	
50m breaststroke	28.58	h	Marko Blaževski	Macedonia	10 December 2016	World Championships	Windsor, Canada	
100m breaststroke	1:01.38	h	Marko Blaževski	Macedonia	6 December 2016	World Championships	Windsor, Canada	
200m breaststroke	2:11.92	tt	Marko Blaževski	Macedonia	20 February 2016	Royal Open	Charlotte, United States	
50m butterfly	24.47		Jovan Jankovksi	PK Vardar 2018	30 November 2025	Skopje Open	Skopje, North Macedonia	
100m butterfly	54.05		Jovan Jankovksi	PK Vardar 2018	14 December 2025	Macedonian Winter Championships	Skopje, North Macedonia	
200m butterfly	1:58.37		Aleksandar Malenko	(North Macedonia) Macedonia	April 19, 1997	World Championships	Gothenburg, Sweden	
100m individual medley	55.98	h	Marko Blaževski	Macedonia	6 December 2014	World Championships	Doha, Qatar	
200m individual medley	1:58.99	h	Marko Blaževski	Macedonia	5 December 2014	World Championships	Doha, Qatar	
400m individual medley	4:13.04	h	Marko Blaževski	Macedonia	4 December 2014	World Championships	Doha, Qatar	
4x50m freestyle relay	1:39.99			APK Student				
4x100m freestyle relay	3:35.18			APK Student				
4x200m freestyle relay	7:51.43			APK Student				
4x50m medley relay (club)	1:53.69			APK Student				
4x50m medley relay (national)	1:42.65	h	Gorazd Chepishevski (25.77); Damjan Petrovski (29.64); Ljupcho Angelovski (24.69); Marko Blaževski (22.55)	Macedonia	10 December 2016	World Championships	Windsor, Canada	
4x100m medley relay	4:00.50			APK Student				

Legend: # – Record awaiting ratification by Swimming Federation of Macedonia;
Records not set in finals: h – heat; sf – semifinal; r – relay 1st leg; rh – relay heat 1st leg; b – B final; † – en route to final mark; so – swim-off; tt – time trial

=== Women ===
Event	Time		Name	Club	Date	Meet	Location	Ref
50 m freestyle	26.08	h	Anastasia Bogdanovski	Macedonia	11 December 2016	World Championships	Windsor, Canada	
100 m freestyle	55.98	h	Anastasia Bogdanovski	Macedonia	7 December 2016	World Championships	Windsor, Canada	
200 m freestyle	2:01.27	h	Anastasia Bogdanovski	Macedonia	6 December 2016	World Championships	Windsor, Canada	
400 m freestyle	4:12.03		Mirjana Bosevska					
800 m freestyle	8:35.78		Mirjana Bosevska					
1500 m freestyle	16:14.79		Mirjana Boševska					
50m backstroke	30.22	h	Anastasia Bogdanovski	Macedonia	9 December 2016	World Championships	Windsor, Canada	
100m backstroke	1:03.65		Mia Krstevska	PVK Orion	24 February 2018	BETA Sprint	Skopje, North Macedonia	
200m backstroke	2:17.93		Mia Krstevska	PVK Orion	21 October 2018	International Meeting "13 November"	Skopje, North Macedonia	
50m breaststroke	34.50		Monika Spasova					
50m breaststroke	33.73	'#'	Sofia Damjanova	PK Vardar 2018	1 December 2024	Nacionalno Zimsko Prvenstvo	Skopje, North Macedonia	
100m breaststroke	1:13.89		S. Pavlovska					
200m breaststroke	2:38.47		S. Pavlovska					
50m butterfly	28.75	h	Ana Janevska	Macedonia	14 December 2017	European Championships	Copenhagen, Denmark	
100m butterfly	1:03.03		Natasa Meskovska					
200m butterfly	2:11.02		Vesna Stojanovska					
100m individual medley	1:05.63	h	Anastasia Bogdanovski	Macedonia	8 December 2016	World Championships	Windsor, Canada	
200m individual medley	2:15.42		Mirjana Bosevska					
400m individual medley	4:40.44		Mirjana Bosevska					
4x50 free relay	2:06.45			APK Student				
4x100 free relay	4:13.84			APK Student				
4x200 free relay	9:14.37			APK Student				
4x50 medley relay	2:17.91			APK Student				
4x100 medley relay	4:36.71			(North Macedonia) Macedonia				

Legend: # – Record awaiting ratification by Swimming Federation of Macedonia;
Records not set in finals: h – heat; sf – semifinal; r – relay 1st leg; rh – relay heat 1st leg; b – B final; † – en route to final mark; so – swim-off; tt – time trial
