= Macedonia at the 2015 World Aquatics Championships =

- Flag of Macedonia
- FINA code: MKD
- National federation: Swimming Federation of Macedonia

in Kazan, Russia
- Competitors: 3 in 2 sports
- Medals: Gold 0 Silver 0 Bronze 0 Total 0

World Aquatics Championships appearances
- 1994; 1998; 2001; 2003; 2005; 2007; 2009; 2011; 2013; 2015; 2017; 2019; 2022; 2023; 2024

Other related appearances
- Yugoslavia (1973–1991)

Macedonia competed at the 2015 World Aquatics Championships in Kazan, Russia from 24 July to 9 August 2015.

== Open water swimming ==
Macedonia has qualified one swimmer to compete in the open water marathon.

Athlete	Event	Time	Rank
Evgenij Pop Acev	Men's 25 km	5:04:43.4	14

== Swimming ==
Macedonian swimmers have achieved qualifying standards in the following events (up to a maximum of 2 swimmers in each event at the A-standard entry time, and 1 at the B-standard):

Men

Athlete	Event	Heat		Semifinal		Final	
Athlete	Event	Time	Rank	Time	Rank	Time	Rank
Marko Blaževski	200 m individual medley	2:04.79	33	did not advance			
Marko Blaževski	400 m individual medley	4:25.57	33	—		did not advance	

Women

Athlete	Event	Heat		Semifinal		Final	
Athlete	Event	Time	Rank	Time	Rank	Time	Rank
Anastasia Bogdanovski	100 m freestyle	56.12	35	did not advance			
Anastasia Bogdanovski	200 m freestyle	2:01.28	35	did not advance			
