= Macedonia at the 2011 World Aquatics Championships =

- Flag of Macedonia
- FINA code: MKD
- National federation: Swimming Federation of Macedonia

in Shanghai, China
- Competitors: 2 in 1 sports
- Medals Ranked -th: Gold 0 Silver 0 Bronze 0 Total 0

World Aquatics Championships appearances
- 1994; 1998; 2001; 2003; 2005; 2007; 2009; 2011; 2013; 2015; 2017; 2019; 2022; 2023; 2024

Other related appearances
- Yugoslavia (1973–1991)

Macedonia competed at the 2011 World Aquatics Championships in Shanghai, China between July 16 and 31, 2011.

== Swimming ==
Macedonia qualified 2 swimmers.

Men

Athlete	Event	Heats		Semifinals		Final	
Athlete	Event	Time	Rank	Time	Rank	Time	Rank
Marko Blazevski	Men's 800m Freestyle	8:27.39	46			did not advance	
Marko Blazevski	Men's 400m IM	4:32.96	31			did not advance	

Women

Athlete	Event	Heats		Semifinals		Final	
Athlete	Event	Time	Rank	Time	Rank	Time	Rank
Simona Marinova	Women's 800m Freestyle	9:12.47	32			did not advance	
Simona Marinova	Women's 1500m Freestyle	17:44.99	26			did not advance	
