= Macedonia at the 2016 Summer Olympics =

- Flag of the Republic of Macedonia
- IOC code: MKD
- NOC: Olympic Committee of North Macedonia
- Website: www.mok.org.mk (in Macedonian)

in Rio de Janeiro
- Competitors: 6 in 4 sports
- Flag bearer: Anastasia Bogdanovski
- Medals: Gold 0 Silver 0 Bronze 0 Total 0

Summer Olympics appearances (overview)
- 1996; 2000; 2004; 2008; 2012; 2016; 2020; 2024; 2028

Other related appearances
- Yugoslavia (1920–1988); Independent Olympic Participants (1992)

Republic of Macedonia, under the name of the Former Yugoslav Republic of Macedonia (now North Macedonia), competed at the 2016 Summer Olympics in Rio de Janeiro, Brazil, from 5 to 21 August 2016.

The Olympic Committee of the Former Yugoslav Republic of Macedonia selected a team of six athletes, two men and four women, to compete in four different sports at these Games. For the first time in Olympic history, Macedonia was represented by more women than men.

Five Macedonian athletes made their Olympic debut in Rio de Janeiro, with individual medley swimmer Marko Blaževski returning for his second appearance from London 2012. Joining him was freestyle swimmer Anastasia Bogdanovski, who set a historic milestone as Macedonia's first female flag bearer in the opening ceremony.

Macedonia, however, failed to earn a single Olympic medal for the fourth consecutive in a row.

== Athletics ==
Macedonian athletes have so far achieved qualifying standards in the following athletics events (up to a maximum of 3 athletes in each event):

Key

- Note–Ranks given for track events are within the athlete's heat only
- Q = Qualified for the next round
- q = Qualified for the next round as a fastest loser or, in field events, by position without achieving the qualifying target
- NR = National record
- N/A = Round not applicable for the event
- Bye = Athlete not required to compete in round

Track & road events

Athlete	Event	Heat		Quarterfinal		Semifinal		Final	
Athlete	Event	Result	Rank	Result	Rank	Result	Rank	Result	Rank
Riste Pandev	Men's 100 m	10.72	1 Q	10.71	9	Did not advance			
Drita Islami	Women's 400 m hurdles	1:01.18	7	—N/a		Did not advance			

== Judo ==
North Macedonia has received an invitation from the Tripartite Commission to send a judoka competing in the women's half-middleweight category (63 kg) to the Olympics, signifying the nation's Olympic debut in the sport.

Athlete	Event	Round of 32	Round of 16	Quarterfinals	Semifinals	Repechage	Final / BM	
Athlete	Event	Opposition Result	Opposition Result	Opposition Result	Opposition Result	Opposition Result	Opposition Result	Rank
Katerina Nikoloska	Women's −63 kg	Katipoğlu (TUR); L 000–000 S	Did not advance					

== Shooting ==
North Macedonia has received an invitation from the Tripartite Commission to send Nina Balaban in the women's air rifle to the Olympics, as long as the minimum qualifying score (MQS) was met by March 31, 2016. This also signified the nation's Olympic comeback to the sport after an eight-year hiatus.

Athlete	Event	Qualification		Final	
Athlete	Event	Points	Rank	Points	Rank
Nina Balaban	Women's 10 m air rifle	407.7	42	Did not advance	

Qualification Legend: Q = Qualify for the next round; q = Qualify for the bronze medal (shotgun)

== Swimming ==
North Macedonia has received a Universality invitation from FINA to send two swimmers (one male and one female) to the Olympics.

Athlete	Event	Heat		Semifinal		Final	
Athlete	Event	Time	Rank	Time	Rank	Time	Rank
Marko Blaževski	Men's 200 m individual medley	2:02.54	26	Did not advance			
Anastasia Bogdanovski	Women's 200 m freestyle	2:00.52 NR	33	Did not advance			
