= Macedonia at the 2013 World Aquatics Championships =

- Flag of Macedonia
- FINA code: MKD
- National federation: Swimming Federation of Macedonia

in Barcelona, Spain
- Competitors: 3 in 1 sports
- Medals Ranked -th: Gold 0 Silver 0 Bronze 0 Total 0

World Aquatics Championships appearances
- 1994; 1998; 2001; 2003; 2005; 2007; 2009; 2011; 2013; 2015; 2017; 2019; 2022; 2023; 2024

Other related appearances
- Yugoslavia (1973–1991)

Macedonia competed at the 2013 World Aquatics Championships in Barcelona, Spain from 19 July to 4 August 2013.

== Swimming ==
Macedonian swimmers achieved qualifying standards in the following events (up to a maximum of 2 swimmers in each event at the A-standard entry time, and 1 at the B-standard):

Men

Athlete	Event	Heat		Semifinal		Final	
Athlete	Event	Time	Rank	Time	Rank	Time	Rank
Marko Blaževski	200 m freestyle	1:54.26	51	did not advance			
Marko Blaževski	200 m individual medley	2:07.78	46	did not advance			
Gorazd Chepishevski	100 m backstroke	1:00.11	43	did not advance			
Gorazd Chepishevski	200 m backstroke	2:09.89	32	did not advance			

Women

Athlete	Event	Heat		Semifinal		Final	
Athlete	Event	Time	Rank	Time	Rank	Time	Rank
Anastasia Bogdanovski	50 m freestyle	26.93	46	did not advance			
Anastasia Bogdanovski	100 m freestyle	57.78	44	did not advance			
