= Swimming at the 2011 World Aquatics Championships – Men's 400 metre individual medley =

Men's 400 metre individual medley at the 2011 World Aquatics Championships
- Dates: July 31, 2011 (heats and final)
- Competitors: 36 from 29 nations
- Winning time: 4:07.13

Medalists
gold medal	Ryan Lochte	United States
silver medal	Tyler Clary	United States
bronze medal	Yuya Horihata	Japan

The men's 400 metre individual medley competition of the swimming events was held on July 31 with the semifinals and the final.

== Records ==
Prior to the competition, the existing world and championship records were as follows.

	Name	Nation	Time	Location	Date
World record	Michael Phelps	United States	4:03.84	Beijing	August 10, 2008
Championship record	Michael Phelps	United States	4:06.22	Melbourne	April 1, 2007

== Results ==
=== Heats ===
34 swimmers participated in 5 heats.

Rank	Heat	Lane	Name	Nationality	Time	Notes
1	5	4	Ryan Lochte	United States	4:11.89	Q
2	5	3	Yuya Horihata	Japan	4:13.68	Q
3	3	3	Huang Chaosheng	China	4:14.07	Q
4	4	4	Tyler Clary	United States	4:14.98	Q
5	3	7	Ioannis Drymonakos	Greece	4:15.01	Q
5	5	5	Dávid Verrasztó	Hungary	4:15.01	Q
7	4	5	Wang Chengxiang	China	4:16.45	Q
8	4	3	Roberto Pavoni	Great Britain	4:16.48	Q
9	4	7	Riaan Schoeman	South Africa	4:16.53	
10	4	6	Joseph Roebuck	Great Britain	4:16.95	
11	5	6	Yannick Lebherz	Germany	4:17.31	
12	4	1	Dinko Jukić	Austria	4:17.36	
13	5	1	Thomas Fraser-Holmes	Australia	4:18.49	
14	3	1	Diogo Carvalho	Portugal	4:18.68	
15	2	4	Jung Won-Yong	South Korea	4:18.98	
16	2	3	Taki M'rabet	Tunisia	4:18.99	
17	5	7	Maksym Shemberev	Ukraine	4:19.29	
18	4	2	Luca Marin	Italy	4:19.48	
19	3	6	Federico Turrini	Italy	4:19.50	
20	4	8	Raphaël Stacchiotti	Luxembourg	4:20.64	NR
21	5	8	Andrew Ford	Canada	4:20.87	
22	3	4	László Cseh	Hungary	4:22.26	
23	5	2	Gal Nevo	Israel	4:25.96	
24	2	2	Nuttapong Ketin	Thailand	4:26.41	
25	3	2	Mitch Larkin	Australia	4:26.91	
26	2	1	Aleksey Derlyugov	Uzbekistan	4:27.19	
27	2	5	Pedro Pinotes	Angola	4:28.81	
28	3	8	Ezequiel Trujillo Aviles	Mexico	4:30.85	
29	2	7	Morad Berrada	Morocco	4:31.97	
30	2	8	Diego Castillo	Panama	4:32.39	
31	1	4	Marko Blazevski	North Macedonia	4:32.96	
32	1	5	Rafael Alfaro	El Salvador	4:35.84	
33	2	6	Vo Thái Nguyên	Vietnam	4:41.02	
34	1	3	Ahmed Atari	Qatar	5:16.80	
-	1	6	Adbulrahman Alishaq	Qatar		DNS
-	3	5	Thiago Pereira	Brazil		DNS

=== Final ===
The final was held at 18:09.

Rank	Lane	Name	Nationality	Time	Notes
1st place, gold medalist(s)	4	Ryan Lochte	United States	4:07.13	
2nd place, silver medalist(s)	6	Tyler Clary	United States	4:11.17	
3rd place, bronze medalist(s)	5	Yuya Horihata	Japan	4:11.98	NR
4	3	Huang Chaosheng	China	4:13.62	
5	2	Ioannis Drymonakos	Greece	4:14.62	NR
6	7	Dávid Verrasztó	Hungary	4:15.67	
7	1	Wang Chengxiang	China	4:15.89	
8	8	Roberto Pavoni	Great Britain	4:19.85	
