= Swimming at the 2010 Asian Games – Men's 400 metre individual medley =

Men's 400 metre individual medley at the 2010 Asian Games
- Venue: Aoti Aquatics Centre
- Date: 13 November 2010
- Competitors: 15 from 11 nations

Medalists
gold medal	Yuya Horihata	Japan
silver medal	Huang Chaosheng	China
bronze medal	Ken Takakuwa	Japan

The men's 400 metre individual medley event at the 2010 Asian Games took place on 13 November 2010 at Guangzhou Aoti Aquatics Centre.

There were 15 competitors from 11 countries who took part in this event. Two heats were held. The heat in which a swimmer competed did not formally matter for advancement, as the swimmers with the top eight times from both field qualified for the finals.

Asian record holder Yuya Horihata from Japan won the gold medal with 4 minutes 13.35 seconds. Huang Chaosheng from China finished second, falling behind only 0.03 seconds.

== Schedule ==
All times are China Standard Time (UTC+08:00)

Date	Time	Event
Saturday, 13 November 2010	09:10	Heats
Saturday, 13 November 2010	18:07	Final

== Records ==
Prior to this competition, the existing world, Asian and Games records were as follows.

World Record	Michael Phelps (USA)	4:03.84	Beijing, China	10 August 2008
Asian Record	Yuya Horihata (JPN)	4:12.02	Tokyo, Japan	18 April 2010
Games Record	Wu Peng (CHN)	4:15.38	Busan, South Korea	4 October 2002

== Results ==
=== Heats ===
Rank	Heat	Athlete	Time	Notes
1	2	Huang Chaosheng (CHN)	4:21.52	
2	2	Yuya Horihata (JPN)	4:22.18	
3	2	Jung Won-yong (KOR)	4:23.14	
4	1	Ken Takakuwa (JPN)	4:24.02	
5	1	Wang Chengxiang (CHN)	4:25.42	
6	1	Nuttapong Ketin (THA)	4:27.94	
7	1	Kim Min-gyu (KOR)	4:29.42	
8	2	Dmitriy Gordiyenko (KAZ)	4:30.71	
9	2	Aleksey Derlyugov (UZB)	4:31.26	
10	2	Vasilii Danilov (KGZ)	4:33.89	
11	1	Pang Sheng Jun (SIN)	4:34.19	
12	2	Kevin Chu (HKG)	4:36.64	
13	1	Saeid Maleka Ashtiani (IRI)	4:36.85	
14	1	Sobitjon Amilov (UZB)	4:37.01	
15	2	Loai Tashkandi (KSA)	4:41.92	

=== Final ===
Rank	Athlete	Time	Notes
1st place, gold medalist(s)	Yuya Horihata (JPN)	4:13.35	GR
2nd place, silver medalist(s)	Huang Chaosheng (CHN)	4:13.38	
3rd place, bronze medalist(s)	Ken Takakuwa (JPN)	4:16.42	
4	Wang Chengxiang (CHN)	4:19.65	
5	Jung Won-yong (KOR)	4:24.82	
6	Nuttapong Ketin (THA)	4:25.62	
7	Kim Min-gyu (KOR)	4:27.03	
8	Dmitriy Gordiyenko (KAZ)	4:30.21	
