= North Macedonia at the 2024 World Aquatics Championships =

- Flag of North Macedonia
- FINA code: MKD
- National federation: Swimming Federation of North Macedonia
- Website: www.pfm.mk

in Doha, Qatar
- Competitors: 2 in 1 sport
- Medals: Gold 0 Silver 0 Bronze 0 Total 0

World Aquatics Championships appearances
- 1994; 1998; 2001; 2003; 2005; 2007; 2009; 2011; 2013; 2015; 2017; 2019; 2022; 2023; 2024

Other related appearances
- Yugoslavia (1973–1991)

North Macedonia competed at the 2024 World Aquatics Championships in Doha, Qatar from 2 to 18 February.

== Competitors ==
The following is the list of competitors in the Championships.

Sport	Men	Women	Total
Swimming	1	1	1
Total	1	1	2

== Swimming ==
North Macedonia entered 2 swimmers.

Men

Athlete	Event	Heat		Semifinal		Final	
Athlete	Event	Time	Rank	Time	Rank	Time	Rank
Nikola Ǵuretanoviḱ	400 metre freestyle	4:04.76	43	—		Did not advance	
Nikola Ǵuretanoviḱ	1500 metre freestyle	16:04.07	29	—		Did not advance	

Women

Athlete	Event	Heat		Semifinal		Final	
Athlete	Event	Time	Rank	Time	Rank	Time	Rank
Eva Petrovska	400 metre freestyle	4:25.21	27	—		Did not advance	
Eva Petrovska	800 metre freestyle	9:04.27	24	—		Did not advance	
