= Swimming at the 2010 Asian Games – Men's 200 metre individual medley =

Men's 200 metre individual medley at the 2010 Asian Games
- Venue: Aoti Aquatics Centre
- Date: 17 November 2010
- Competitors: 23 from 16 nations

Medalists
gold medal	Ken Takakuwa	Japan
silver medal	Wang Shun	China
bronze medal	Yuya Horihata	Japan

The men's 200 metre individual medley event at the 2010 Asian Games took place on 17 November 2010 at Guangzhou Aoti Aquatics Centre.

There were 23 competitors from 16 countries who took part in this event. Three heats were held. The heat in which a swimmer competed did not formally matter for advancement, as the swimmers with the top eight times from the entire field qualified for the finals.

Ken Takakuwa from Japan won the gold medal with 1 minute 58.31 seconds.

== Schedule ==
All times are China Standard Time (UTC+08:00)

Date	Time	Event
Wednesday, 17 November 2010	09:46	Heats
Wednesday, 17 November 2010	18:40	Final

== Records ==
Prior to this competition, the existing world, Asian and Games records were as follows.

World Record	Ryan Lochte (USA)	1:54.10	Rome, Italy	30 July 2009
Asian Record	Ken Takakuwa (JPN)	1:57.24	Hamamatsu, Japan	18 April 2009
Games Record	Takahiro Mori (JPN)	2:00.53	Busan, South Korea	30 September 2002

== Results ==
=== Heats ===
Rank	Heat	Athlete	Time	Notes
1	3	Ken Takakuwa (JPN)	2:01.80	
2	2	Wang Shun (CHN)	2:03.72	
3	1	Zhang Zishan (CHN)	2:04.28	
4	2	Yuya Horihata (JPN)	2:04.71	
5	2	Miguel Molina (PHI)	2:04.94	
6	1	Nuttapong Ketin (THA)	2:05.06	
7	3	Kim Min-gyu (KOR)	2:05.09	
8	3	Aleksey Derlyugov (UZB)	2:05.54	
9	3	Dmitriy Gordiyenko (KAZ)	2:06.24	
10	1	Jung Won-yong (KOR)	2:06.91	
11	3	Saeid Maleka Ashtiani (IRI)	2:07.19	
12	2	Sobitjon Amilov (UZB)	2:07.92	
13	1	Pang Sheng Jun (SIN)	2:08.29	
14	2	Ian James Barr (MAS)	2:08.46	
15	3	Rehan Poncha (IND)	2:08.55	
16	2	Vasilii Danilov (KGZ)	2:09.63	
17	3	Joshua Lim (SIN)	2:11.15	
18	1	Kevin Chu (HKG)	2:11.70	
19	1	Loai Tashkandi (KSA)	2:12.13	
20	1	Obaid Al-Jasmi (UAE)	2:12.31	
21	2	Cheung Siu Hang (HKG)	2:13.26	
22	3	Ahmed Atari (QAT)	2:24.46	
23	2	Abdulrahman Al-Ollan (QAT)	2:31.85	

=== Final ===
Rank	Athlete	Time	Notes
1st place, gold medalist(s)	Ken Takakuwa (JPN)	1:58.31	GR
2nd place, silver medalist(s)	Wang Shun (CHN)	1:59.72	
3rd place, bronze medalist(s)	Yuya Horihata (JPN)	2:00.48	
4	Zhang Zishan (CHN)	2:01.52	
5	Miguel Molina (PHI)	2:04.24	
6	Aleksey Derlyugov (UZB)	2:04.94	
7	Kim Min-gyu (KOR)	2:05.12	
8	Nuttapong Ketin (THA)	2:05.14	
