= Macedonia at the 2017 World Aquatics Championships =

- Flag of Macedonia
- World Aquatics code: MKD
- National federation: Swimming Federation of Macedonia

in Budapest, Hungary
- Competitors: 2 in 2 sports
- Medals: Gold 0 Silver 0 Bronze 0 Total 0

World Aquatics Championships appearances
- 1994; 1998; 2001; 2003; 2005; 2007; 2009; 2011; 2013; 2015; 2017; 2019; 2022; 2023; 2024; 2025

Other related appearances
- Yugoslavia (1973–1991)

Macedonia is scheduled to compete at the 2017 World Aquatics Championships in Budapest, Hungary from 14 July to 30 July.

== Open water swimming ==
Macedonia has entered one open water swimmer

Athlete	Event	Time	Rank
Evgenij Pop Acev	Men's 10 km	1:59:55.6	49
Evgenij Pop Acev	Men's 25 km	5:06:23.4	12

== Swimming ==
Macedonia has received a Universality invitation from FINA to send a female swimmer to the World Championships.

Athlete	Event	Heat		Semifinal		Final	
Athlete	Event	Time	Rank	Time	Rank	Time	Rank
Anastasia Bogdanovski	Women's 100 m freestyle	56.56	33	did not advance			
Anastasia Bogdanovski	Women's 200 m freestyle	2:02.92	28	did not advance			
