= North Macedonia at the 2023 World Aquatics Championships =

- Flag of North Macedonia
- FINA code: MKD
- National federation: Swimming Federation of North Macedonia
- Website: www.pfm.mk

in Fukuoka, Japan
- Competitors: 4 in 1 sport
- Medals: Gold 0 Silver 0 Bronze 0 Total 0

World Aquatics Championships appearances
- 1994; 1998; 2001; 2003; 2005; 2007; 2009; 2011; 2013; 2015; 2017; 2019; 2022; 2023; 2024

Other related appearances
- Yugoslavia (1973–1991)

North Macedonia competed at the 2023 World Aquatics Championships in Fukuoka, Japan from 14 to 30 July.

== Swimming ==
North Macedonia entered 4 swimmers.

Men

Athlete	Event	Heat		Semifinal		Final	
Athlete	Event	Time	Rank	Time	Rank	Time	Rank
Nikola Ǵuretanoviḱ	400 metre freestyle	4:07.87	45	—		Did not advance	
Nikola Ǵuretanoviḱ	200 metre individual medley	2:13.17	44	Did not advance			
Andrej Stojanovski	50 metre backstroke	27.35	50	Did not advance			
Andrej Stojanovski	200 metre breaststroke	2:25.40	42	Did not advance			

Women

Athlete	Event	Heat		Semifinal		Final	
Athlete	Event	Time	Rank	Time	Rank	Time	Rank
Mia Blaževska Eminova	100 metre freestyle	58.05	36	Did not advance			
Mia Blaževska Eminova	50 metre backstroke	30.41	44	Did not advance			
Eva Petrovska	400 metre freestyle	4:24.92	35	—		Did not advance	
Eva Petrovska	800 metre freestyle	9:06.00	32	—		Did not advance	
