= Macedonia at the 2004 Summer Olympics =

- Flag of the Republic of Macedonia
- IOC code: MKD
- NOC: Macedonian Olympic Committee
- Website: www.mok.org.mk (in Macedonian)

in Athens
- Competitors: 10 in 5 sports
- Flag bearer: Blagoja Georgievski
- Medals: Gold 0 Silver 0 Bronze 0 Total 0

Summer Olympics appearances (overview)
- 1996; 2000; 2004; 2008; 2012; 2016; 2020; 2024

Other related appearances
- Yugoslavia (1920–1988); Independent Olympic Participants (1992)

North Macedonia competed at the 2004 Summer Olympics in Athens, Greece, from 13 to 29 August 2004. This was the nation's third consecutive appearance at the Summer Olympics in the post-Yugoslav era.

The Macedonian Olympic Committee selected a team of ten athletes, seven men and three women, to compete in five different sports at these Olympic Games. Seven of them had previously competed in Sydney, including slalom kayaker Lazar Popovski, who became the first Macedonian athlete to compete in four editions of the Olympic Games (although he first appeared in 1992 as part of the Independent Olympic Participants), and freestyle wrestler Mogamed Ibragimov, who won the bronze in the men's 84 kg class. Former basketball player, 1976 Olympic silver medalist, and assistant coach Blagoja Georgievski was appointed by the committee to carry the Macedonian flag in the opening ceremony.

Macedonia left Athens without receiving a single Olympic medal for the first time since the nation made its Olympic debut at the 1996 Summer Olympics in Atlanta.

== Athletics ==
Macedonian athletes have so far achieved qualifying standards in the following athletics events (up to a maximum of 3 athletes in each event at the 'A' Standard, and 1 at the 'B' Standard).

Key

- Note – Ranks given for track events are within the athlete's heat only
- Q = Qualified for the next round
- q = Qualified for the next round as a fastest loser or, in field events, by position without achieving the qualifying target
- NR = National record
- N/A = Round not applicable for the event
- Bye = Athlete not required to compete in round

Men

Athlete	Event	Heat		Semifinal		Final	
Athlete	Event	Result	Rank	Result	Rank	Result	Rank
Vančo Stojanov	800 m	1:49.02	7	Did not advance			

Women

Athlete	Event	Heat		Quarterfinal		Semifinal		Final	
Athlete	Event	Result	Rank	Result	Rank	Result	Rank	Result	Rank
Aleksandra Vojnevska	100 m	12.15	6	Did not advance					

== Canoeing ==
=== Slalom ===
Athlete	Event	Preliminary						Semifinal		Final			
Athlete	Event	Run 1	Rank	Run 2	Rank	Total	Rank	Time	Rank	Time	Rank	Total	Rank
Lazar Popovski	Men's K-1	96.92	8	96.14	6	193.06	6 Q	100.80	16	Did not advance			

== Shooting ==
One Macedonian shooter qualified to compete in the following events:

Women

Athlete	Event	Qualification		Final	
Athlete	Event	Points	Rank	Points	Rank
Divna Pešić	10 m air rifle	368	44	Did not advance	
Divna Pešić	50 m rifle 3 positions	555	32	Did not advance	

== Swimming ==
Macedonian swimmers earned qualifying standards in the following events (up to a maximum of 2 swimmers in each event at the A-standard time, and 1 at the B-standard time):

Men

Athlete	Event	Heat		Semifinal		Final	
Athlete	Event	Time	Rank	Time	Rank	Time	Rank
Zoran Lazarevski	200 m butterfly	2:02.26	27	Did not advance			
Aleksandar Malenko	200 m freestyle	1:53.00	35	Did not advance			
Aleksandar Miladinovski	100 m butterfly	55.71	45	Did not advance			
Aleksandar Miladinovski	200 m individual medley	2:07.39	38	Did not advance			

Women

Athlete	Event	Heat		Semifinal		Final	
Athlete	Event	Time	Rank	Time	Rank	Time	Rank
Vesna Stojanovska	200 m freestyle	2:04.64	34	Did not advance			
Vesna Stojanovska	400 m freestyle	4:19.39	27	—		Did not advance	
Vesna Stojanovska	200 m butterfly	2:16.51	26	Did not advance			

== Wrestling ==
Key

- VT – Victory by Fall.
- PP - Decision by Points - the loser with technical points.
- PO - Decision by Points - the loser without technical points.

Men's freestyle

Athlete	Event	Elimination Pool			Quarterfinal	Semifinal	Final / BM	
Athlete	Event	Opposition Result	Opposition Result	Rank	Opposition Result	Opposition Result	Opposition Result	Rank
Sihamir Osmanov	−74 kg	Paslar (BUL); L 1–3 ^{PP}	Brzozowski (POL); L 0–3 ^{PO}	3	Did not advance			17
Mogamed Ibragimov	−84 kg	Moon E-J (KOR); L 0–3 ^{PO}	Gochev (BUL); L 1–3 ^{PP}	3	Did not advance			19

== See also ==
- Macedonia at the 2004 Summer Paralympics
