= North Macedonia at the 2024 Summer Olympics =

- IOC code: MKD
- NOC: Olympic Committee of North Macedonia
- Website: www.mok.org.mk (in Macedonian)

in Paris, France 26 July 2024 – 11 August 2024
- Competitors: 6 (4 men and 2 women) in 6 sports
- Flag bearers: Dario Ivanovski & Miljana Reljiḱ
- Medals: Gold 0 Silver 0 Bronze 0 Total 0

Summer Olympics appearances (overview)
- 1996; 2000; 2004; 2008; 2012; 2016; 2020; 2024

Other related appearances
- Yugoslavia (1920–1988); Independent Olympic Participants (1992)

North Macedonia competed at the 2024 Summer Olympics in Paris, France, from 26 July to 11 August 2024. It was the nation's eighth consecutive appearance at the Summer Olympics; six of the editions competed under the name of Macedonia or Republic of Macedonia, and it will be the second Olympic Games (the first being the 2022 Winter Olympics) at which the country competes under the new name.

== Competitors ==
The following is the list of number of competitors in the Games.

Sport	Men	Women	Total
Athletics	1	0	1
Judo	1	0	1
Shooting	0	1	1
Swimming	1	0	1
Taekwondo	0	1	1
Wrestling	1	0	1
Total	4	2	6

== Athletics ==
One Macedonian runner will compete at Paris 2024, after receiving the direct universality spots in the following event:

Key

- Note–Ranks given for track events are within the athlete's heat only
- Q = Qualified for the next round
- q = Qualified for the next round as a fastest loser or, in field events, by position without achieving the qualifying target
- NR = National record
- N/A = Round not applicable for the event
- Bye = Athlete not required to compete in round

Track and road events

Athlete	Event	Final	
Athlete	Event	Result	Rank
Dario Ivanovski	Men's marathon	2:28:15	69

== Judo ==
North Macedonia qualified one judoka for the following weight class at the Games. Edi Šerifovski qualified for the games through the allocations of universality places.

Athlete	Event	Round of 32	Round of 16	Quarterfinals	Semifinals	Repechage	Final / BM	
Athlete	Event	Opposition Result	Opposition Result	Opposition Result	Opposition Result	Opposition Result	Opposition Result	Rank
Edi Šerifovski	Men's −81 kg	Schimidt (BRA); L 00–11	Did not advance					

== Shooting ==
Shooters from North Macedonia achieved one quota places for Paris 2024 based on the allocations of universality spots.

Athlete	Event	Qualification		Final	
Athlete	Event	Points	Rank	Points	Rank
Anastasija Mojsovska	Women's 10 m air rifle	625.3	31	Did not advance	

== Swimming ==
North Macedonia qualified two swimmers to compete at the 2024 Paris Olympics. Eva Petrovska did not compete at the Games due to health issues meaning Nikola Ǵuretanoviḱ was the only Macedonian to compete in swimming events.

Athlete	Event	Heat		Final	
Athlete	Event	Time	Rank	Time	Rank
Nikola Ǵuretanoviḱ	Men's 400 m freestyle	4:05.38	37	Did not advance	

== Taekwondo ==
North Macedonia send one Taekwondo practitioner to Paris 2024. Miljana Reljiḱ received a quota based on the allocation universality place.

Athlete	Event	Round of 16	Quarterfinals	Semifinals	Repechage	Final / BM	
Athlete	Event	Opposition Result	Opposition Result	Opposition Result	Opposition Result	Opposition Result	Rank
Miljana Reljiḱ	Women's −57 kg	Jones (GBR); W 2–1 (7–6, 4–5, 1–1)	Aoun (LBN); L 0–2 (8–9, 6–6)	Did not advance			

== Wrestling ==
North Macedonia is sending one wrestler, Vladimir Egorov. Egorov received a quota due to the reallocation of Individual Neutral Athletes (AIN) claimed by the IOC.

Key:

- VT (ranking points: 5–0 or 0–5) – Victory by fall.
- VB (ranking points: 5–0 or 0–5) – Victory by injury (VF for forfeit, VA for withdrawal or disqualification)
- PP (ranking points: 3–1 or 1–3) – Decision by points – the loser with technical points.
- PO (ranking points: 3–0 or 0–3) – Decision by points – the loser without technical points.
- ST (ranking points: 4–0 or 0–4) – Great superiority – the loser without technical points and a margin of victory of at least 8 (Greco-Roman) or 10 (freestyle) points.
- SP (ranking points: 4–1 or 1–4) – Technical superiority – the loser with technical points and a margin of victory of at least 8 (Greco-Roman) or 10 (freestyle) points.

Freestyle

Athlete	Event	Round of 16	Quarterfinal	Semifinal	Repechage	Final / BM	
Athlete	Event	Opposition Result	Opposition Result	Opposition Result	Opposition Result	Opposition Result	Rank
Vladimir Egorov	Men's −57 kg	Aman Sehrawat (IND); L 0–10ST	Did not advance				15
