= Macedonia at the 2012 Summer Olympics =

- Flag of the Republic of Macedonia
- IOC code: MKD
- NOC: Olympic Committee of the Former Yugoslav Republic of Macedonia
- Website: www.mok.org.mk (in Macedonian)

in London
- Competitors: 4 in 2 sports
- Flag bearers: Marko Blaževski (opening); Kristijan Efremov (closing)
- Medals: Gold 0 Silver 0 Bronze 0 Total 0

Summer Olympics appearances (overview)
- 1996; 2000; 2004; 2008; 2012; 2016; 2020; 2024

Other related appearances
- Yugoslavia (1920–1988); Independent Olympic Participants (1992)

Macedonia, under the name of Former Yugoslav Republic of Macedonia, competed at the 2012 Summer Olympics in London, United Kingdom, held from 27 July to 12 August 2012. This was the nation's fifth consecutive appearance at the Summer Olympics in the post-Yugoslav era.

Four athletes were selected to the team by wild card places, without having qualified, competing only in athletics and swimming. This was also the nation's smallest delegation to be sent to the Games in the post-Yugoslav era. Marko Blaževski, a medley swimmer and finance student at Wingate University in North Carolina, was appointed by the Macedonian Olympic Committee to be the nation's flag bearer at the opening ceremony. For the first time in Olympic history, Macedonia did not qualify athletes in freestyle wrestling, slalom canoeing, and shooting.

Macedonia failed for the third consecutive time to win an Olympic medal.

== Athletics ==
Macedonian athletes received wild cards for both men's and women's 400 metres.

Key

- Note – Ranks given for track events are within the athlete's heat only
- Q = Qualified for the next round
- q = Qualified for the next round as a fastest loser or, in field events, by position without achieving the qualifying target
- NR = National record
- N/A = Round not applicable for the event
- Bye = Athlete not required to compete in round

Men

Athlete	Event	Heat		Semifinal		Final	
Athlete	Event	Result	Rank	Result	Rank	Result	Rank
Kristijan Efremov	400 m	47.92	7	did not advance			

Women

Athlete	Event	Heat		Semifinal		Final	
Athlete	Event	Result	Rank	Result	Rank	Result	Rank
Hristina Risteska	400 m	1:00.86	7	did not advance			

== Swimming ==
Macedonia has selected one swimmer to qualify in the Olympic Games.

Men

Athlete	Event	Heat		Final	
Athlete	Event	Time	Rank	Time	Rank
Marko Blaževski	400 m individual medley	4:32.38	34	did not advance	

Women

Athlete	Event	Heat		Final	
Athlete	Event	Time	Rank	Time	Rank
Simona Marinova	800 m freestyle	9:28.41	35	did not advance	
