= 2001 Skopje protests =

2001 protest in Macedonia

- Part of the Aračinovo crisis
- Date: 26 June 2001
- Location: Skopje, Macedonia
- Caused by: Halting of the Macedonian assault on Aračinovo; Evacuation of around 500 NLA militants; Involvement of the international community
- Methods: Vandalism; Demonstrations; Rioting; Violence; Property damage; Occupation of administrative buildings

Parties
(North Macedonia) Macedonian protesters; (North Macedonia) Macedonian citizens; Macedonian army soldiers and reservists; Macedonian policemen; Macedonian nationalists	(North Macedonia) Macedonian Government; Macedonian Police

Number
3,000–5,000 protesters	Around 50 policemen

Casualties
- Death: None

The 2001 Skopje protests in Skopje, Macedonia, began after the evacuation of National Liberation Army (NLA) insurgents during the Aračinovo crisis, involvement of the international community, and the halting of the Macedonian assault of Aračinovo. Around 3,000 to 5,000 Macedonians protested against the Government of Macedonia.

== Storming the Parliament building ==
On 26 June 2001, from 3,000 to 5,000 Macedonian protesters, armed with machine guns, broke into the Parliament building and demanded to talk to the President of Macedonia at the time, Boris Trajkovski, shouting "treason", calling for "resignation", and deriding Trajkovski's decision to allow the rebels to take their weapons when they retreated. Some protesters chanted anti-Albanian slogans such as "Gas chambers for the Albanians", "death to the Albanians", "kill the Albanians", as well as demanding that ethnic Albanian rebels be killed.

The crowd was made up of army and police, as well as reservists who kept the NLA encircled in Aračinovo. They later managed to get into the building, where they started to break windows and furniture, and destroyed two police cars. Macedonian flags were hung on balconies. Protesters replaced the Macedonian flag with the country's former Vergina Sun flag. The president's Mercedes-Benz was destroyed. Trajkovski was evacuated after demonstrators broke into the Parliament building. Several police officers and several journalists were injured.

== See also ==
- 2001 anti-Albanian protests
