= Swimming at the 2012 Summer Olympics – Men's 400 metre individual medley =

Men's 400 metre individual medley at the Games of the XXX Olympiad
- Venue: London Aquatics Centre
- Dates: July 28, 2012 (heats & final)
- Competitors: 37 from 29 nations
- Winning time: 4:05.18

Medalists
| 1st place, gold medalist(s) | | Ryan Lochte | United States |
| 2nd place, silver medalist(s) | | Thiago Pereira | Brazil |
| 3rd place, bronze medalist(s) | | Kosuke Hagino | Japan |

The men's 400 metre individual medley event at the 2012 Summer Olympics took place on 28 July at the London Aquatics Centre in London, United Kingdom.

U.S. Ryan Lochte pulled away from the rest of the field, including double defending champion Michael Phelps, over a wide margin to capture the Olympic title in the event. He rocketed to a strong finish in a sterling textile best of 4:05.18, the second fastest ever behind Phelps' 2008 world record by 1.34 seconds. Meanwhile, Brazil's Thiago Pereira powered home with the silver in a matching South American record of 4:08.86, making him the first swimmer for his nation to claim an Olympic medal in the event, since Ricardo Prado did so in 1984. Japanese teen Kosuke Hagino smashed an Asian record of 4:08.94 to edge Phelps out of the podium for the bronze.

For the first time since his official debut in 2000, Phelps struggled to a fourth-place finish and denied his seventeenth career medal in 4:09.28. He almost missed the final roster by a small fraction of a second, after posting an eighth-seeded time of 4:13.33 from the morning prelims.

South Africa's Chad le Clos (4:12.42), Hagino's teammate Yuya Horihata (4:13.30), Aussie swimmer Thomas Fraser-Holmes (4:13.49), and Italy's Luca Marin (4:14.89) rounded out the historic finale. Surprisingly, Hungary's top medal favorite and European champion László Cseh missed the final by seven-hundredths of a second (0.07) with a ninth-place effort (4:13.40).

== Records ==
Prior to this competition, the existing world and Olympic records were as follows.

| World record | Michael Phelps (USA) | 4:03.84 | Beijing, China | 10 August 2008 |
| Olympic record | Michael Phelps (USA) | 4:03.84 | Beijing, China | 10 August 2008 |

== Results ==
=== Heats ===
| Rank | Heat | Lane | Name | Nationality | Time | Notes |
|---|---|---|---|---|---|---|
| 1 | 3 | 4 | Kosuke Hagino | Japan | 4:10.01 | Q, AS |
| 2 | 5 | 2 | Chad le Clos | South Africa | 4:12.24 | Q, NR |
| 3 | 5 | 4 | Ryan Lochte | United States | 4:12.35 | Q |
| 4 | 3 | 6 | Thiago Pereira | Brazil | 4:12.39 | Q |
| 5 | 5 | 3 | Thomas Fraser-Holmes | Australia | 4:12.66 | Q |
| 6 | 5 | 6 | Luca Marin | Italy | 4:13.02 | Q |
| 7 | 5 | 5 | Yuya Horihata | Japan | 4:13.09 | Q |
| 8 | 4 | 4 | Michael Phelps | United States | 4:13.33 | Q |
| 9 | 4 | 5 | László Cseh | Hungary | 4:13.40 | |
| 10 | 3 | 1 | Gal Nevo | Israel | 4:14.77 | |
| 11 | 4 | 2 | Yannick Lebherz | Germany | 4:15.41 | |
| 12 | 3 | 3 | Yang Zhixian | China | 4:15.45 | |
| 13 | 4 | 6 | Roberto Pavoni | Great Britain | 4:15.56 | |
| 14 | 4 | 3 | Wang Chengxiang | China | 4:15.57 | |
| 15 | 4 | 1 | Maksym Shemberev | Ukraine | 4:16.63 | |
| 16 | 2 | 4 | Ward Bauwens | Belgium | 4:16.71 | NR |
| 17 | 4 | 7 | Ioannis Drymonakos | Greece | 4:17.04 | |
| 18 | 2 | 6 | Raphaël Stacchiotti | Luxembourg | 4:17.20 | NR |
| 19 | 5 | 1 | Riaan Schoeman | South Africa | 4:17.22 | |
| 19 | 5 | 7 | Federico Turrini | Italy | 4:17.22 | |
| 21 | 3 | 7 | Alexander Tikhonov | Russia | 4:18.12 | |
| 22 | 3 | 5 | Dávid Verrasztó | Hungary | 4:18.31 | |
| 23 | 4 | 8 | Alec Page | Canada | 4:19.17 | |
| 24 | 3 | 2 | Joe Roebuck | Great Britain | 4:20.24 | |
| 25 | 1 | 5 | Bradley Ally | Barbados | 4:21.32 | |
| 26 | 2 | 2 | Yury Suvorau | Belarus | 4:23.06 | NR |
| 26 | 2 | 5 | Diogo Carvalho | Portugal | 4:23.06 | |
| 28 | 2 | 3 | Jung Won-yong | South Korea | 4:23.12 | |
| 29 | 2 | 1 | Esteban Enderica Salgado | Ecuador | 4:24.32 | NR |
| 30 | 2 | 8 | Pedro Pinotes | Angola | 4:24.69 | |
| 31 | 1 | 4 | Anton Sveinn McKee | Iceland | 4:25.06 | NR |
| 32 | 5 | 8 | Daniel Tranter | Australia | 4:25.76 | |
| 33 | 2 | 7 | Quah Zheng Wen | Singapore | 4:26.81 | |
| 34 | 1 | 6 | Marko Blaževski | Macedonia | 4:32.38 | |
| 35 | 1 | 3 | Rafael Alfaro | El Salvador | 4:35.80 | |
| 36 | 1 | 2 | Ahmed Ghithe Atari | Qatar | 5:21.30 | |
| | 3 | 8 | Taki Mrabet | Tunisia | DSQ | |

=== Final ===
| Rank | Lane | Name | Nationality | Time | Notes |
|---|---|---|---|---|---|
| 1st place, gold medalist(s) | 3 | Ryan Lochte | United States | 4:05.18 | |
| 2nd place, silver medalist(s) | 6 | Thiago Pereira | Brazil | 4:08.86 | SA |
| 3rd place, bronze medalist(s) | 4 | Kosuke Hagino | Japan | 4:08.94 | AS |
| 4 | 8 | Michael Phelps | United States | 4:09.28 | |
| 5 | 5 | Chad le Clos | South Africa | 4:12.42 | |
| 6 | 1 | Yuya Horihata | Japan | 4:13.30 | |
| 7 | 2 | Thomas Fraser-Holmes | Australia | 4:13.49 | |
| 8 | 7 | Luca Marin | Italy | 4:14.89 | |
