= Swimming at the 2026 European Aquatics Championships – Men's 200 metre freestyle =

Men's 200 metre freestyle at the 2026 European Aquatics Championships
- Venue: Paris Aquatic Centre
- Dates: 13 August (heats and semifinals); 14 August (final)
- Competitors: 87 from 36 nations
- Winning time: 1:44.15

Medalists
| gold medal | David Popovici | Romania |
| silver medal | Tomas Navikonis | Lithuania |
| bronze medal | James Guy | Great Britain |

The Men's 200 metre freestyle competition of the 2026 European Aquatics Championships will be held on 13 and 14 August 2026.

== Records ==
Prior to the competition, the existing world, European and championship records were as follows.

| | Name | Nationality | Time | Location | Date |
|---|---|---|---|---|---|
| World record | Paul Biedermann | Germany | 1:42.00 | Rome | 28 July 2009 |
| European record | Paul Biedermann | Germany | 1:42.00 | Rome | 28 July 2009 |
| Championship record | David Popovici | Romania | 1:42.97 | Rome | 15 August 2022 |

== Results ==
=== Heats ===
The heats were started on 13 August at 9:30.
Qualification Rules: The 16 fastest from the heats qualify to the semifinals.

| Rank | Heat | Lane | Swimmer | Nation | Time | Notes |
|---|---|---|---|---|---|---|
| 1 | 7 | 6 | Christian Giefing | Austria | 1:44.96 | Q, NR |
| 2 | 7 | 5 | James Guy | Great Britain | 1:45.40 | Q |
| 3 | 7 | 1 | Sauveur Cristofini | France | 1:45.93 | Q |
| 4 | 9 | 4 | David Popovici | Romania | 1:46.06 | Q |
| 5 | 7 | 2 | Lucas Henveaux | Belgium | 1:46.10 | Q |
| 6 | 8 | 4 | Lukas Märtens | Germany | 1:46.12 | Q |
| 7 | 7 | 9 | Tomas Navikonis | Lithuania | 1:46.22 | Q |
| 8 | 9 | 3 | Jack McMillan | Great Britain | 1:46.36 | Q |
| 9 | 9 | 5 | Kamil Sieradzki | Poland | 1:46.39 | Q |
| 10 | 8 | 7 | Ivan Girev | Neutral Athletes B | 1:46.43 | Q |
| 11 | 9 | 0 | Jarno Baschnitt | Germany | 1:46.45 | Q |
| 12 | 5 | 3 | Thomas Dean | Great Britain | 1:46.48 | |
| 13 | 9 | 7 | Roman Fuchs | France | 1:46.83 | Q |
| 14 | 9 | 2 | Robin Hanson | Sweden | 1:46.84 | Q |
| 15 | 6 | 1 | Danas Rapšys | Lithuania | 1:46.94 | Q |
| 16 | 8 | 3 | Antonio Djakovic | Switzerland | 1:47.07 | Q |
| 17 | 8 | 5 | Carlos D'Ambrosio | Italy | 1:47.16 | Q |
| 18 | 7 | 0 | Denis Loktev | Israel | 1:47.21 | |
| 19 | 6 | 2 | Jacopo Barbotti | Italy | 1:47.22 | |
| 19 | 9 | 1 | Dimitrios Markos | Greece | 1:47.22 | |
| 21 | 8 | 1 | Tomas Koski | Finland | 1:47.31 | |
| 22 | 5 | 1 | Mattia Mauri | Switzerland | 1:47.35 | |
| 22 | 7 | 7 | Timo Sorgius | Germany | 1:47.35 | |
| 24 | 8 | 9 | Marco de Tullio | Italy | 1:47.47 | |
| 25 | 4 | 9 | Franko Grgić | Croatia | 1:47.51 | |
| 26 | 5 | 2 | Eitan Ben Shitrit | Israel | 1:47.59 | |
| 26 | 9 | 8 | Roman Akimov | Neutral Athletes B | 1:47.59 | |
| 28 | 6 | 6 | Oliver Søgaard-Andersen | Denmark | 1:47.64 | |
| 29 | 8 | 0 | Evan Bailey | Ireland | 1:47.67 | |
| 29 | 8 | 2 | Nikolai Kolesnikov | Neutral Athletes B | 1:47.67 | |
| 31 | 6 | 3 | Alexey Glivinskiy | Israel | 1:47.83 | |
| 32 | 5 | 4 | Ludvig Bartolek | Sweden | 1:47.87 | |
| 33 | 6 | 5 | Kristupas Trepočka | Lithuania | 1:47.97 | |
| 34 | 6 | 9 | Ralph Daleiden | Luxembourg | 1:47.98 | |
| 35 | 6 | 0 | Romano Yoav | Israel | 1:48.09 | |
| 35 | 9 | 6 | Sander Kiær Sørensen | Norway | 1:48.09 | |
| 37 | 7 | 8 | Petar Mitsin | Bulgaria | 1:48.22 | |
| 38 | 9 | 9 | Andrei Cherepkov | Neutral Athletes B | 1:48.23 | |
| 39 | 8 | 6 | Tajus Juska | Lithuania | 1:48.24 | |
| 40 | 8 | 8 | Niko Janković | Croatia | 1:48.28 | |
| 41 | 3 | 5 | Jovan Lekic | Bosnia and Herzegovina | 1:48.54 | |
| 41 | 5 | 5 | Illia Linnyk | Ukraine | 1:48.54 | |
| 43 | 6 | 8 | Alessandro Ragaini | Italy | 1:48.62 | |
| 44 | 7 | 3 | Ahmet Mete Boylu | Turkey | 1:48.66 | |
| 45 | 5 | 0 | Samuel Kostal | Slovakia | 1:48.77 | |
| 46 | 5 | 6 | Merlin Belmon | Netherlands | 1:48.98 | |
| 47 | 6 | 7 | Konstantinos Englezakis | Greece | 1:49.14 | |
| 48 | 4 | 6 | Milan Vojtko | Slovakia | 1:49.24 | |
| 49 | 4 | 2 | Eric-Stefan Andries | Romania | 1:49.27 | |
| 50 | 5 | 9 | Sašo Boškan | Slovenia | 1:49.38 | |
| 51 | 4 | 3 | František Jablčník | Slovakia | 1:49.42 | |
| 52 | 4 | 7 | Liggjas Joensen | Faroe Islands | 1:49.53 | |
| 52 | 5 | 7 | Balint Ashton | Switzerland | 1:49.53 | |
| 54 | 4 | 8 | Cormac Rynn | Ireland | 1:50.00 | |
| 55 | 6 | 4 | Miguel Pérez-Godoy | Spain | 1:50.04 | |
| 56 | 5 | 8 | Kenan Dracic | Bosnia and Herzegovina | 1:50.09 | |
| 57 | 3 | 2 | Charlie Skoglund Macmillan | Sweden | 1:50.67 | |
| 57 | 3 | 8 | Isak Dag Brisenfeldt | Faroe Islands | 1:50.67 | |
| 59 | 3 | 7 | Thomas Jansen | Netherlands | 1:50.80 | |
| 60 | 3 | 1 | Vasil Tushev | Bulgaria | 1:51.04 | |
| 61 | 2 | 4 | Primož Senica Pavletic | Slovenia | 1:51.05 | |
| 62 | 3 | 3 | Vadym Naumenko | Ukraine | 1:51.11 | |
| 63 | 3 | 6 | Filip Mujan | Croatia | 1:51.20 | |
| 64 | 2 | 7 | Biel Cuen Sibila | Andorra | 1:51.26 | |
| 65 | 2 | 6 | Denis O'Brien | Ireland | 1:51.51 | |
| 66 | 4 | 5 | Karlo Perčinić | Croatia | 1:51.92 | |
| 67 | 3 | 0 | Ted Nilsson | Sweden | 1:52.19 | |
| 68 | 2 | 5 | Oskar Farkas | Norway | 1:52.25 | |
| 69 | 2 | 3 | Birk Lee Johansen | Norway | 1:52.32 | |
| 70 | 2 | 2 | Nikola Gjuretanovikj | North Macedonia | 1:52.59 | |
| 71 | 4 | 0 | Lars Kuljus | Estonia | 1:53.22 | |
| 72 | 2 | 9 | Liam Custer | Ireland | 1:53.34 | |
| 73 | 2 | 1 | Donats Dragasjus | Latvia | 1:53.61 | |
| 74 | 3 | 4 | Miroslav Terziev | Bulgaria | 1:53.70 | |
| 75 | 3 | 9 | Siim Keskula | Estonia | 1:53.91 | |
| 76 | 1 | 4 | Mathias Christensen | Denmark | 1:54.46 | |
| 77 | 2 | 0 | Strahinja Maslo | Serbia | 1:54.68 | |
| 78 | 1 | 3 | Nooa Matela | Finland | 1:55.35 | |
| 79 | 2 | 8 | Kevin Teixeira Pereira | Andorra | 1:56.62 | |
| 80 | 1 | 6 | Heini Mohr Askham | Faroe Islands | 1:56.67 | |
| 81 | 1 | 5 | Silas Dam Lindberg | Faroe Islands | 1:57.93 | |
| 82 | 1 | 7 | Arion Budima | Kosovo | 1:59.19 | |
| 83 | 1 | 2 | Edlijano Huna | Albania | 1:59.54 | |
| 84 | 1 | 1 | Dion Daja | Albania | 2:05.00 | |
| | 7 | 4 | Matthew Richards | Great Britain | DNS | |
| | 4 | 4 | Konstantinos Emmanouil Stamou | Greece | DNS | |
| | 4 | 1 | Ronny Brannkarr | Finland | DNS | |

=== Semifinals ===
The semifinals will begin in the evening of 13 August.
Qualification Rules: The fastest 8 qualified competitors from the semifinals advance to the final.

| Rank | Heat | Lane | Name | Nationality | Time | Notes |
|---|---|---|---|---|---|---|
| 1 | 1 | 5 | David Popovici | Romania | 1:44.56 | Q |
| 2 | 1 | 3 | Lukas Martens | Germany | 1:44.79 | Q |
| 3 | 1 | 4 | James Guy | Great Britain | 1:45.14 | Q |
| 4 | 1 | 8 | Carlos D'Ambrosio | Italy | 1:45.38 | Q |
| 5 | 2 | 4 | Christian Giefing | Austria | 1:45.47 | Q |
| 6 | 1 | 6 | Jack McMillan | Great Britain | 1:45.55 | Q |
| 7 | 2 | 6 | Tomas Navikonis | Lithuania | 1:45.63 | Q |
| 8 | 2 | 3 | Lucas Henveaux | Belgium | 1:45.72 | Q |
| 9 | 2 | 5 | Sauveur Cristofini | France | 1:45.74 | |
| 10 | 2 | 7 | Jarno Baschnitt | Germany | 1:45.76 | |
| 11 | 1 | 2 | Ivan Girev | Neutral Athletes B | 1:45.82 | |
| 12 | 1 | 1 | Danas Rapsys | Lithuania | 1:46.28 | |
| 13 | 1 | 7 | Roman Fuchs | France | 1:46.59 | |
| 14 | 2 | 8 | Antonio Djakovic | Switzerland | 1:46.60 | |
| 15 | 2 | 1 | Robin Hanson | Sweden | 1:46.63 | |
| 16 | 2 | 2 | Kamil Sieradzki | Poland | 1:46.64 | |

=== Final ===
The final was held on 14 August.

| Rank | Lane | Name | Nationality | Time | Notes |
|---|---|---|---|---|---|
| (gold) | 4 | David Popovici | Romania | 1:44.15 | |
| (silver) | 1 | Tomas Navikonis | Lithuania | 1:44.55 | |
| (bronze) | 3 | James Guy | Great Britain | 1:44.87 | |
| 4 | 2 | Christian Giefing | Austria | 1:45.14 | |
| 5 | 6 | Carlos D'Ambrosio | Italy | 1:45.19 | |
| 6 | 7 | Jack McMillan | Great Britain | 1:45.31 | |
| 7 | 5 | Lukas Martens | Germany | 1:45.58 | |
| 8 | 8 | Lucas Henveaux | Belgium | 1:45.87 | |
