= Swimming at the 2016 Summer Olympics – Women's 200 metre freestyle =

Women's 200 metre freestyle at the Games of the XXXI Olympiad
- Venue: Olympic Aquatics Stadium
- Dates: 8 August 2016 (heats & semifinals); 9 August 2016 (final)
- Competitors: 43 from 28 nations
- Winning time: 1:53.73

Medalists
1st place, gold medalist(s)		Katie Ledecky	United States
2nd place, silver medalist(s)		Sarah Sjöström	Sweden
3rd place, bronze medalist(s)		Emma McKeon	Australia

The women's 200 metre freestyle event at the 2016 Summer Olympics took place 8–9 August at the Olympic Aquatics Stadium.

== Summary ==
After a world-record breaking victory in the 400 m freestyle two days earlier, U.S. distance ace Katie Ledecky pulled away from the field to capture the Olympic mid-distance freestyle crown and her second individual gold at these Games. Hanging with the leaders at the 150-metre turn, Ledecky fended off Sweden's Sarah Sjöström towards a gold-medal finish in 1:53.73. Despite trying to hold on Ledecky at the final lap, Sjöström was unable to catch her near the wall, and settled for the silver in 1:54.08. Meanwhile, Australia's Emma McKeon moved up from one of the outside lanes to take home the bronze in 1:54.92.

Italy's world-record holder Federica Pellegrini dropped off the podium for the second straight Olympics to fourth in 1:55.18, charging a 0.07-second edge ahead of China's Shen Duo and McKeon's countrywoman Bronte Barratt, bronze medalist from London 2012, both of whom shared the fifth-place time with a matching 1:55.25. Sjöström's teammate Michelle Coleman grabbed the penultimate spot of the top eight in 1:56.27, with France's Charlotte Bonnet (1:56.29) narrowly trailing her by 0.02 of a second to round out the field.

Notable swimmers missed the final roster, including four-time Olympic gold medalist Missy Franklin, who tied for thirteenth with Hong Kong's Siobhán Haughey (1:57.56) in the semifinals.

In the medal ceremony, the medals for the competition were presented by Franco Carraro, Italy, IOC member, and the gifts were presented by Paolo Barelli, Italy, Honorary Secretary of FINA.

== Records ==
Prior to this competition, the existing world and Olympic records were as follows.

World record	Federica Pellegrini (ITA)	1:52.98	Rome, Italy	29 July 2009
Olympic record	Allison Schmitt (USA)	1:53.61	London, United Kingdom	31 July 2012

== Competition format ==
The competition consisted of three rounds: heats, semifinals, and a final. The swimmers with the best 16 times in the heats advanced to the semifinals. The swimmers with the best 8 times in the semifinals advanced to the final. Swim-offs were used as necessary to break ties for advancement to the next round.

== Results ==
=== Heats ===
Rank	Heat	Lane	Name	Nationality	Time	Notes
1	5	4	Katie Ledecky	United States	1:55.01	Q
2	5	5	Emma McKeon	Australia	1:55.80	Q
3	6	4	Sarah Sjöström	Sweden	1:56.11	Q
4	6	6	Charlotte Bonnet	France	1:56.26	Q
5	4	4	Federica Pellegrini	Italy	1:56.37	Q
6	6	3	Shen Duo	China	1:56.52	Q
7	5	3	Michelle Coleman	Sweden	1:56.54	Q
8	4	6	Ai Yanhan	China	1:56.77	Q
9	3	6	Siobhán Haughey	Hong Kong	1:56.91	Q, NR
10	5	6	Bronte Barratt	Australia	1:56.93	Q
11	4	3	Veronika Popova	Russia	1:57.08	Q
12	4	5	Missy Franklin	United States	1:57.12	Q
13	3	5	Katerine Savard	Canada	1:57.15	Q
14	6	8	Manuella Lyrio	Brazil	1:57.28	Q, SA
15	6	5	Femke Heemskerk	Netherlands	1:57.68	Q
16	6	2	Brittany MacLean	Canada	1:57.74	Q
17	6	1	Chihiro Igarashi	Japan	1:57.88	
18	4	7	Arina Openysheva	Russia	1:58.05	
19	5	1	Melania Costa Schmid	Spain	1:58.19	
20	3	7	Annika Bruhn	Germany	1:58.48	
21	5	7	Rikako Ikee	Japan	1:58.49	
22	5	3	Nina Rangelova	Bulgaria	1:58.57	
23	5	2	Coralie Balmy	France	1:58.83	
24	4	2	Alice Mizzau	Italy	1:59.16	
25	4	8	Ajna Késely	Hungary	1:59.20	
26	4	1	Robin Neumann	Netherlands	1:59.23	
27	3	2	Georgia Coates	Great Britain	1:59.33	
28	3	4	Evelyn Verrasztó	Hungary	1:59.44	
29	3	8	Camille Cheng	Hong Kong	1:59.71	
30	2	4	Katarina Simonović	Serbia	2:00.06	
31	2	3	Barbora Seemanová	Czech Republic	2:00.26	
32	5	8	Eleanor Faulkner	Great Britain	2:00.51	
33	2	6	Anastasia Bogdanovski	Macedonia	2:00.52	NR
34	3	1	Patricia Castro	Spain	2:00.71	
35	6	7	Larissa Oliveira	Brazil	2:00.76	
36	2	7	Elisbet Gámez	Cuba	2:01.08	
37	2	2	Joanna Evans	Bahamas	2:01.27	NR
38	2	1	Sara Pastrana	Honduras	2:03.19	
39	2	8	Andrea Cedrón	Peru	2:05.33	
40	1	5	Matelita Buadromo	Fiji	2:05.49	
41	1	4	Shivani Kataria	India	2:09.30	
42	1	3	Kaya Forson	Ghana	2:16.02	
	2	5	Andrea Murez	Israel	DNS	

=== Semifinals ===
==== Semifinal 1 ====
Rank	Lane	Name	Nationality	Time	Notes
1	3	Shen Duo	China	1:56.03	Q
2	4	Emma McKeon	Australia	1:56.29	Q
3	5	Charlotte Bonnet	France	1:56.38	Q
4	2	Bronte Barratt	Australia	1:56.63	Q
5	8	Brittany MacLean	Canada	1:57.36	
6	6	Ai Yanhan	China	1:57.41	
7	1	Manuella Lyrio	Brazil	1:57.43	
8	7	Missy Franklin	United States	1:57.56	

==== Semifinal 2 ====
Rank	Lane	Name	Nationality	Time	Notes
1	5	Sarah Sjöström	Sweden	1:54.65	Q
2	4	Katie Ledecky	United States	1:54.81	Q
3	3	Federica Pellegrini	Italy	1:55.42	Q
4	6	Michelle Coleman	Sweden	1:56.05	Q
5	7	Veronika Popova	Russia	1:57.22	
6	2	Siobhán Haughey	Hong Kong	1:57.56	
7	1	Katerine Savard	Canada	1:57.80	
8	8	Femke Heemskerk	Netherlands	1:57.82	

=== Final ===
Rank	Lane	Name	Nationality	Time	Notes
1st place, gold medalist(s)	5	Katie Ledecky	United States	1:53.73	
2nd place, silver medalist(s)	4	Sarah Sjöström	Sweden	1:54.08	NR
3rd place, bronze medalist(s)	7	Emma McKeon	Australia	1:54.92	
4	3	Federica Pellegrini	Italy	1:55.18	
5	6	Shen Duo	China	1:55.25	
5	8	Bronte Barratt	Australia	1:55.25	
7	2	Michelle Coleman	Sweden	1:56.27	
8	1	Charlotte Bonnet	France	1:56.29	
