= Yuya Horihata =

Japanese swimmer (born 1990)

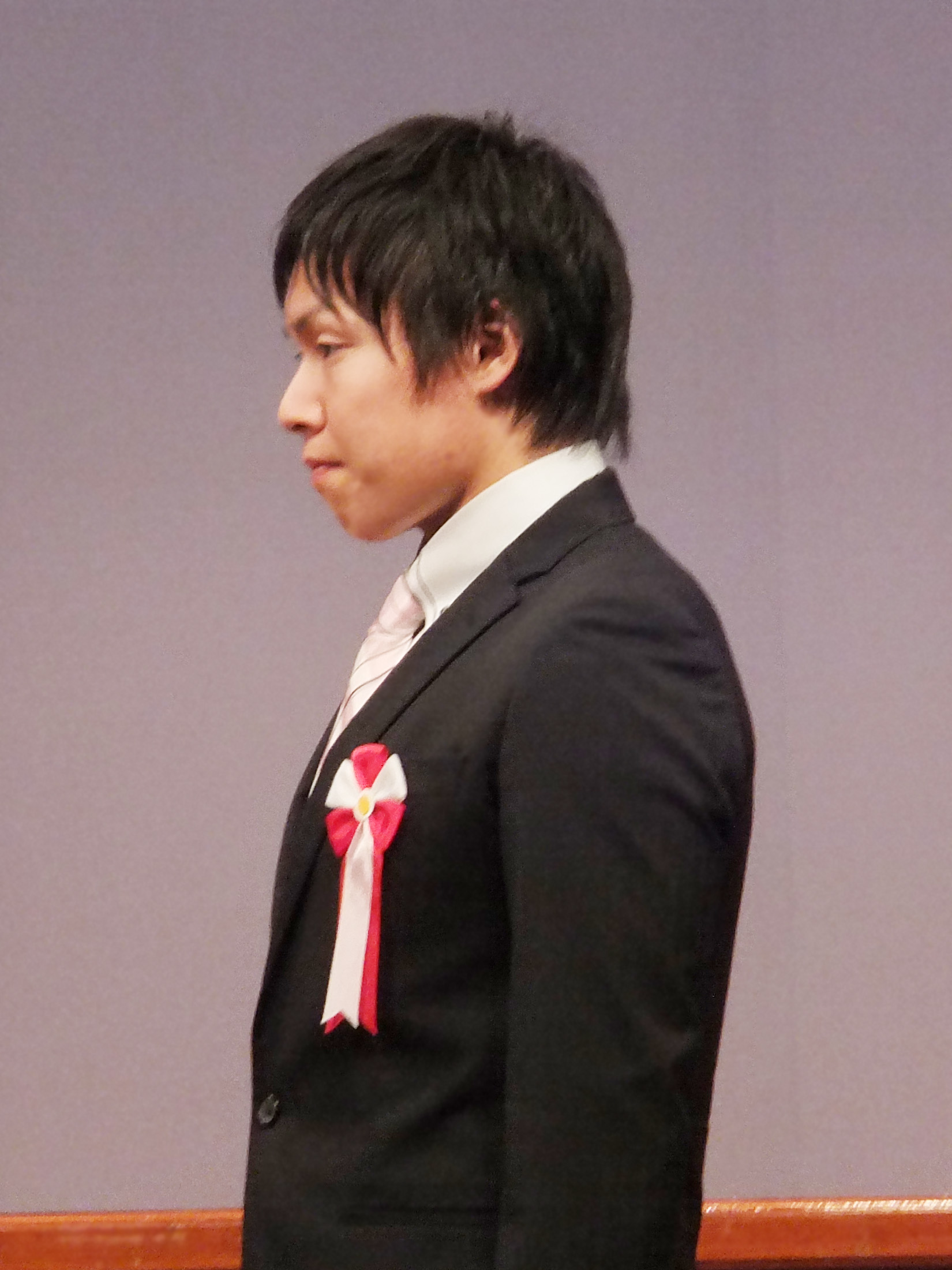
- In 2013 at Toyokawa City's 70th anniversary celebration

Personal information
- Nationality: Japan
- Born: 30 July 1990 (age 35) Ama, Aichi Prefecture, Japan
- Height: 169 cm (5 ft 7 in)
- Weight: 62 kg (137 lb)

Sport
- Sport: Swimming
- Strokes: Freestyle, Medley
- College team: Nippon Sport Science
Medal record
World Championships (LC)
Bronze medal – third place	2011 Shanghai	400 m medley
Asian Games
Gold medal – first place	2010 Guangzhou	400 m medley
Bronze medal – third place	2010 Guangzhou	200 m medley
Youth World Championships
Bronze medal – third place	2008 Monterrey	200 m medley
Bronze medal – third place	2008 Monterrey	4×200 m freestyle
Summer Universiade
Silver medal – second place	2011 Shenzhen	200 m medley
Silver medal – second place	2011 Shenzhen	400 m medley
Silver medal – second place	2011 Shenzhen	4x200 m freestyle
Bronze medal – third place	2009 Belgrade	400 m medley

Yuya Horihata (堀畑 裕也, Horihata Yūya; born 30 July 1990) is a Japanese swimmer, born in Ama County, Aichi. He won two medals at the 2010 Asian Games in Guangzhou, gold in the men's 400 m medley and bronze in the men's 200 m medley.

Horihata competed in the 2012 Summer Olympics, advancing to the final and finishing 6th in the 400 metre individual medley. He also swam on the Japanese team in the 4 × 200 metre freestyle relay that placed 9th in the heats and missed the top-8 cutoff for the final.
