= Swimming at the 2012 Summer Olympics – Men's 200 metre individual medley =

Men's 200 metre individual medley at the Games of the XXX Olympiad
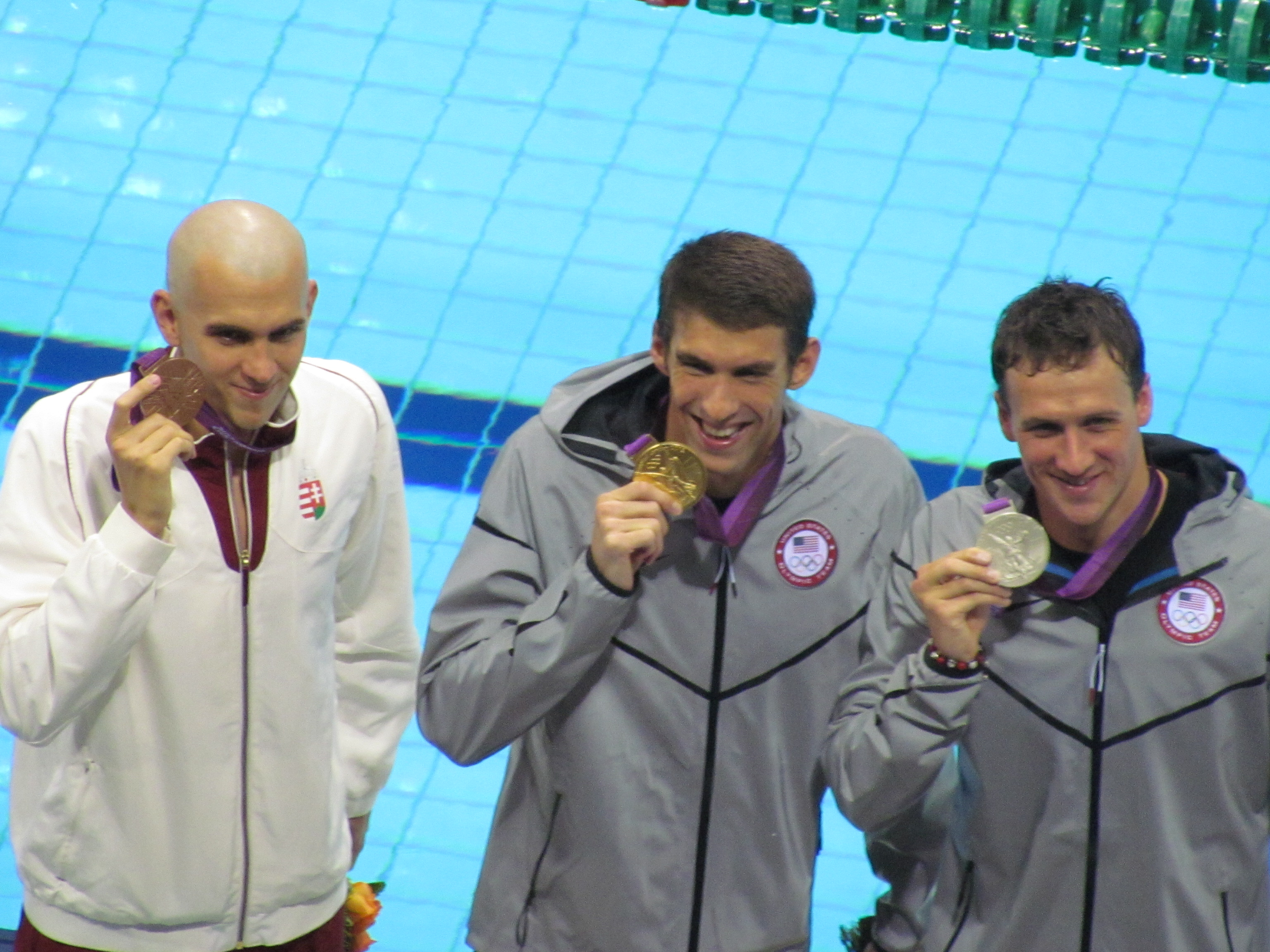
- Medalists of the event
- Venue: London Aquatics Centre
- Date: August 1, 2012 (heats & semifinals); August 2, 2012 (final)
- Competitors: 36 from 27 nations
- Winning time: 1:54.27

Medalists
1st place, gold medalist(s)		Michael Phelps	United States
2nd place, silver medalist(s)		Ryan Lochte	United States
3rd place, bronze medalist(s)		László Cseh	Hungary

The men's 200 metre individual medley event at the 2012 Summer Olympics took place on 1–2 August at the London Aquatics Centre in London, United Kingdom.

Adding to an unprecedented medal tally to become the most decorated Olympian of all time, Michael Phelps made another milestone as the first male swimmer ever to defend his third straight Olympic title in the same individual event with a touch-out triumph over Ryan Lochte. Dominating the race from the start, Phelps held off a final showdown from Lochte on the freestyle leg to claim his sixteenth gold and twentieth career medal in 1:54.27. Meanwhile, Lochte came up short in the other half of a difficult double, as he produced his eleventh overall for the silver in 1:54.90, tying an all-time record with Mark Spitz and Matt Biondi. Hungary's László Cseh powered home with the bronze in 1:56.22 to keep the podium intact for the second straight Games.

Brazil's Thiago Pereira finished fourth in 1:56.74, and was followed in fifth and sixth by Japanese duo Kosuke Hagino (1:57.35) and Ken Takakuwa (1:58.53). Great Britain's James Goddard (1:59.05) and Germany's Markus Deibler (1:59.10) also vied for an Olympic medal to round out the historic finale.

Earlier in the semifinals, South Africa's Chad le Clos also earned a spot for the championship final, but later scratched to focus on the 100 m butterfly, allowing Deibler to join the roster. Meanwhile, Austria's Markus Rogan, double silver medalist and four-time Olympian, was disqualified for an illegal dolphin kick after a technical turn from backstroke to breaststroke.

== Records ==
Prior to this competition, the existing world and Olympic records were as follows.

World record	Ryan Lochte (USA)	1:54.00	Shanghai, China	28 July 2011
Olympic record	Michael Phelps (USA)	1:54.23	Beijing, China	15 August 2008

== Results ==
=== Heats ===
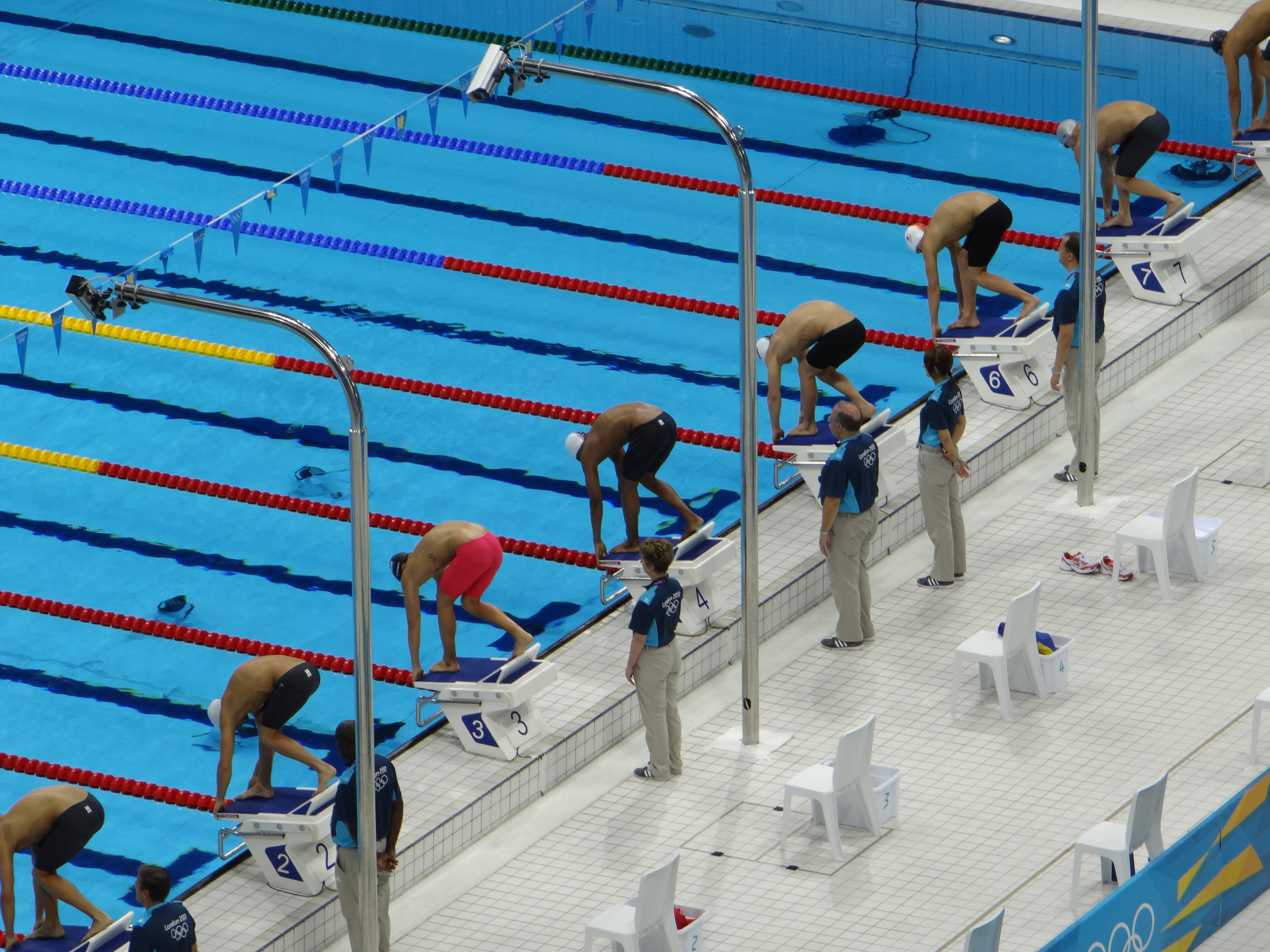
Heat 2

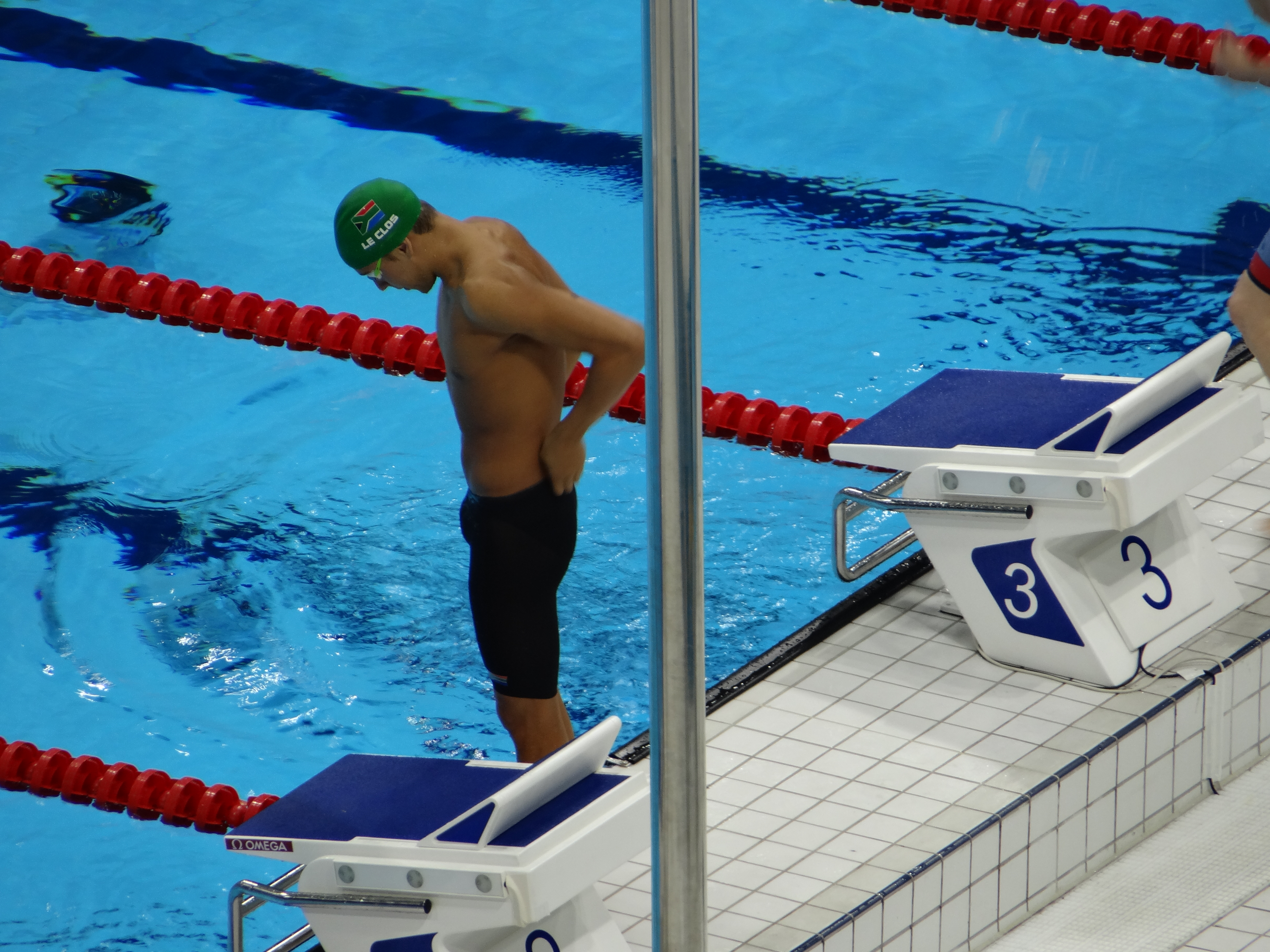
Chad le Clos (heat 3)

Rank	Heat	Lane	Name	Nationality	Time	Notes
1	3	4	László Cseh	Hungary	1:57.20	Q
2	5	4	Ryan Lochte	United States	1:58.03	Q
3	4	3	Kosuke Hagino	Japan	1:58.22	Q
4	4	4	Michael Phelps	United States	1:58.24	Q
5	5	5	Thiago Pereira	Brazil	1:58.31	Q
6	3	5	James Goddard	Great Britain	1:58.56	Q
7	5	3	Markus Deibler	Germany	1:58.61	Q
8	4	5	Markus Rogan	Austria	1:58.66	Q
9	4	6	Ken Takakuwa	Japan	1:58.82	Q
10	5	7	Henrique Rodrigues	Brazil	1:59.37	Q
11	3	2	Chad le Clos	South Africa	1:59.45	Q
12	5	8	Gal Nevo	Israel	1:59.56	Q
13	5	6	Daniel Tranter	Australia	1:59.70	Q
14	5	1	Vytautas Janušaitis	Lithuania	1:59.84	Q
15	3	3	Joe Roebuck	Great Britain	2:00.04	Q
16	2	6	Andrew Ford	Canada	2:00.28	Q
17	2	3	Raphaël Stacchiotti	Luxembourg	2:00.38	
18	3	1	Diogo Carvalho	Portugal	2:00.40	
19	3	8	Marcin Cieślak	Poland	2:00.45	
20	4	8	Federico Turrini	Italy	2:00.63	
21	3	7	Darian Townsend	South Africa	2:00.67	
22	2	4	Bradley Ally	Barbados	2:00.85	
22	3	6	Wang Shun	China	2:00.85	
24	2	5	Alexander Tikhonov	Russia	2:01.00	
25	2	7	Martin Liivamägi	Estonia	2:01.09	
26	2	1	Andreas Vazaios	Greece	2:01.23	
27	4	2	Philip Heintz	Germany	2:01.32	
28	2	8	David Karasek	Switzerland	2:01.35	NR
29	2	2	Taki Mrabet	Tunisia	2:01.41	
30	4	1	Wu Peng	China	2:01.43	
31	4	7	Jayden Hadler	Australia	2:01.54	
32	1	5	Jung Won-yong	South Korea	2:03.33	
33	1	4	Maksym Shemberev	Ukraine	2:03.40	
34	1	3	Nuttapong Ketin	Thailand	2:03.91	
35	5	2	Dávid Verrasztó	Hungary	2:04.53	
36	1	6	Ensar Hajder	Bosnia and Herzegovina	2:05.70	

=== Semifinals ===
==== Semifinal 1 ====
Rank	Lane	Name	Nationality	Time	Notes
1	4	Ryan Lochte	United States	1:56.13	Q
2	5	Michael Phelps	United States	1:57.11	Q
3	3	James Goddard	Great Britain	1:58.49	Q
4	7	Gal Nevo	Israel	1:59.17	
5	2	Henrique Rodrigues	Brazil	1:59.58	
6	1	Vytautas Janušaitis	Lithuania	2:00.13	
7	8	Andrew Ford	Canada	2:01.58	
	6	Markus Rogan	Austria	DSQ	

==== Semifinal 2 ====
Rank	Lane	Name	Nationality	Time	Notes
1	4	László Cseh	Hungary	1:56.74	Q
2	3	Thiago Pereira	Brazil	1:57.45	Q
3	5	Kosuke Hagino	Japan	1:57.95	Q
4	2	Ken Takakuwa	Japan	1:58.31	Q
5	7	Chad le Clos	South Africa	1:58.49	Q, WD
6	6	Markus Deibler	Germany	1:58.88	Q
7	8	Joe Roebuck	Great Britain	1:59.57	
8	1	Daniel Tranter	Australia	2:00.46	

=== Final ===
Rank	Lane	Name	Nationality	Time	Notes
1st place, gold medalist(s)	3	Michael Phelps	United States	1:54.27	
2nd place, silver medalist(s)	4	Ryan Lochte	United States	1:54.90	
3rd place, bronze medalist(s)	5	László Cseh	Hungary	1:56.22	
4	6	Thiago Pereira	Brazil	1:56.74	
5	2	Kosuke Hagino	Japan	1:57.35	
6	7	Ken Takakuwa	Japan	1:58.53	
7	1	James Goddard	Great Britain	1:59.05	
8	8	Markus Deibler	Germany	1:59.10	
