= North Macedonia at the 2022 World Aquatics Championships =

- Flag of North Macedonia
- FINA code: MKD
- National federation: Swimming Federation of North Macedonia
- Website: sfnm.eu

in Budapest, Hungary
- Competitors: 3 in 2 sports
- Medals: Gold 0 Silver 0 Bronze 0 Total 0

World Aquatics Championships appearances
- 1994; 1998; 2001; 2003; 2005; 2007; 2009; 2011; 2013; 2015; 2017; 2019; 2022; 2023; 2024

Other related appearances
- Yugoslavia (1973–1991)

North Macedonia competed at the 2022 World Aquatics Championships in Budapest, Hungary from 18 June to 3 July.

== Open water swimming ==
Swimmers from North Macedonia have achieved qualifying standards in the following events.

Athlete	Event	Time	Rank
Evgenij Pop Acev	Men's 25 km	5:13:52.8	17

== Swimming ==
Swimmers from North Macedonia have achieved qualifying standards in the following events.

Athlete	Event	Heat		Semifinal		Final	
Athlete	Event	Time	Rank	Time	Rank	Time	Rank
Andrej Stojanovski	Men's 50 m backstroke	28.43	44	did not advance			
Andrej Stojanovski	Men's 200 m breaststroke	2:26.11	40	did not advance			
Mia Blaževska Eminova	Women's 50 m backstroke	30.61	29	did not advance			
Mia Blaževska Eminova	Women's 100 m backstroke	1:04.11	30	did not advance			
