= North Macedonia at the 2019 World Aquatics Championships =

- Flag of North Macedonia
- FINA code: MKD
- National federation: Swimming Federation of North Macedonia
- Website: sfnm.eu

in Gwangju, South Korea
- Medals: Gold 0 Silver 0 Bronze 0 Total 0

World Aquatics Championships appearances
- 1994; 1998; 2001; 2003; 2005; 2007; 2009; 2011; 2013; 2015; 2017; 2019; 2022; 2023; 2024

Other related appearances
- Yugoslavia (1973–1991)

North Macedonia competed at the 2019 World Aquatics Championships in Gwangju, South Korea from 12 to 28 July.

== Open water swimming ==
North Macedonia qualified one male open water swimmer.

Athlete	Event	Time	Rank
Evgenij Pop Acev	Men's 10 km	1:52:43.0	51
Evgenij Pop Acev	Men's 25 km	4:54:39.9	13

== Swimming ==
North Macedonia entered four swimmers.

Men

Athlete	Event	Heat		Semifinal		Final	
Athlete	Event	Time	Rank	Time	Rank	Time	Rank
Filip Derkoski	400 m freestyle	4:07.99	45	—		did not advance	
Filip Derkoski	800 m freestyle	8:35.54	38	—		did not advance	
Davor Petrovski	200 m butterfly	2:06.33	44	did not advance			
Davor Petrovski	200 m individual medley	2:10.74	45	did not advance			

Women

Athlete	Event	Heat		Semifinal		Final	
Athlete	Event	Time	Rank	Time	Rank	Time	Rank
Mia Krstevska	100 m backstroke	1:06.00	49	did not advance			
Mia Krstevska	200 m backstroke	2:23.13	37	did not advance			
Eva Petrovska	800 m freestyle	9:12.71	36	—		did not advance	
Eva Petrovska	1500 m freestyle	17:35.18	29	—		did not advance	
