= Ken Takakuwa =

Japanese swimmer (born 1985)

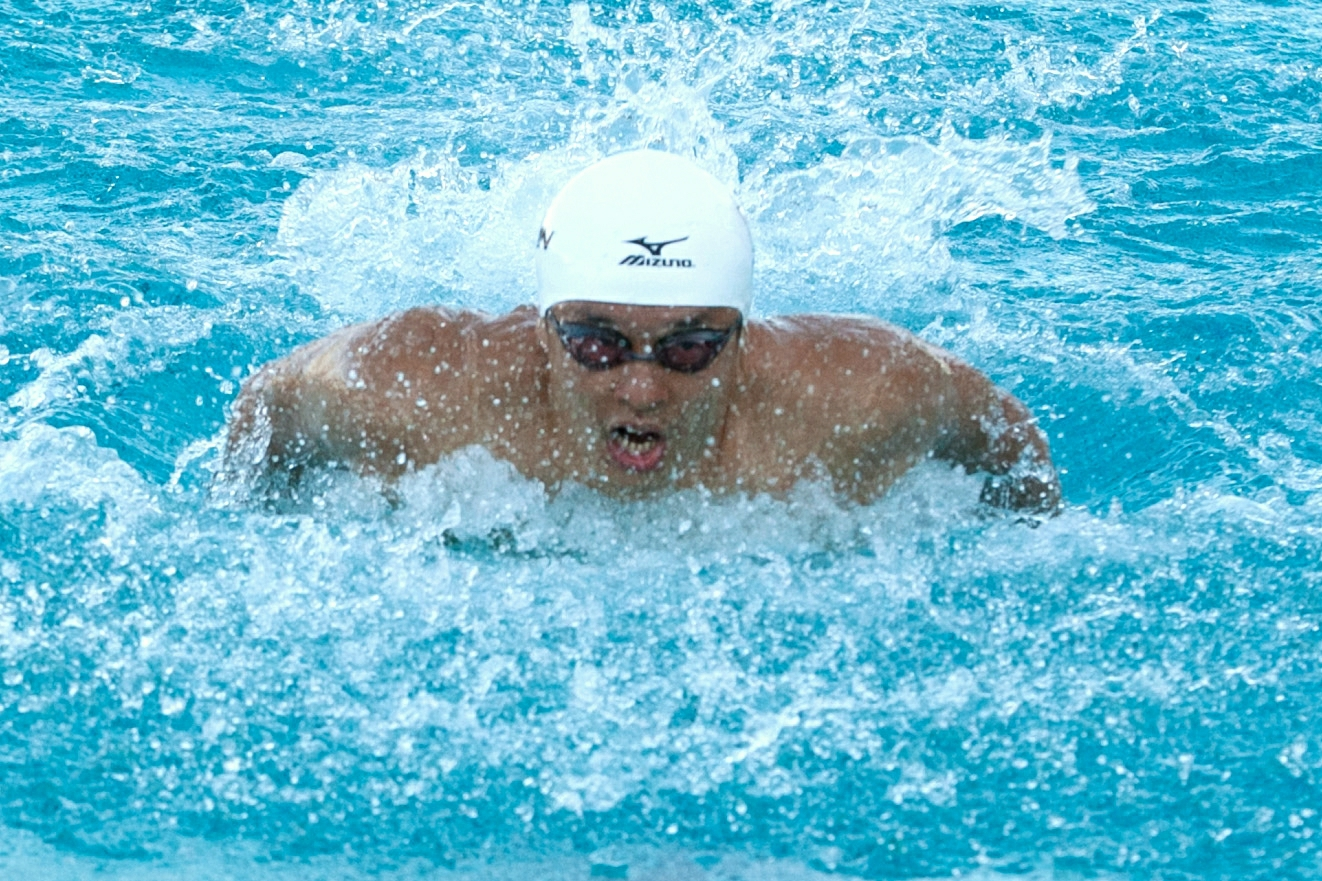

Personal information
- Born: March 25, 1985 (age 41) Shizuoka, Japan

Sport
- Sport: Swimming
Medal record
Representing Japan
Summer Universiade
Silver medal – second place	2007 Bangkok	200m individual medley
Asian Games
Gold medal – first place	2010 Guangzhou	200m individual medley
Silver medal – second place	2006 Doha	200m individual medley
Bronze medal – third place	2010 Guangzhou	400m individual medley

Ken Takakuwa (高桑 健, Takakuwa Ken; born 25 March 1985) is a Japanese swimmer. He was born in Shizuoka. He competed in the 200 m individual medley event at the 2012 Summer Olympics, advanced to the final and finished sixth. Takakuwa also took part in the 200m IM at the 2008 Summer Olympics and placed fifth. In that same event at the Asian games, he won gold in 2010 and silver in 2006. He also won bronze in the 400m IM at the 2010 Asian Games.
