= Wang Chengxiang =

Chinese swimmer

Personal information
- Born: Shandong, China

Sport
- Sport: Swimming
- Strokes: Medley

Wang Chengxiang is a Chinese swimmer who competes in the Men's 400m individual medley. At the 2012 Summer Olympics he finished 14th overall in the heats in the Men's 400 metre individual medley and failed to reach the final.
