= Vesna Stojanovska =

Macedonian swimmer (born 1985)

Personal information
- Full name: Vesna Stojanovska
- National team: North Macedonia
- Born: 20 January 1985 (age 41) Skopje, SR Macedonia, SFR Yugoslavia
- Height: 1.75 m (5 ft 9 in)
- Weight: 63 kg (139 lb)

Sport
- Sport: Swimming
- Strokes: Freestyle, butterfly
- Club: Pine Crest Swim Club (U.S.)
- College team: Georgia Institute of Technology (U.S.)
- Coach: Jay Fitzgerald (U.S.)
Medal record
Women's swimming
Representing Macedonia
European Junior Championships
Silver medal – second place	2001 Valletta	200 m butterfly

Vesna Stojanovska (Macedonian: Весна Стојановска; born January 20, 1985) is a Macedonian former swimmer, who specialized in freestyle and butterfly events. She is a two-time Olympian (2000 and 2004), and holds multiple age-group records in 200 and 400 m freestyle, and in 50, 100, and 200 m butterfly. Regarded as one of Macedonia's top swimmers, Stojanovska has earned All-American honors and numerous Atlantic Coast Conference titles in her own discipline while studying in the United States.

Stojanovska made her first Macedonian team, as a 15-year-old teen, at the 2000 Summer Olympics in Sydney. There, she failed to advance to the succeeding round in any of her individual events, finishing twenty-ninth in the 200 m freestyle (2:05.58) and thirty-first in the 400 m freestyle (4:19.69).

In 2001, Stojanovska moved to United States to afford proper education and ultimately fulfill an American dream. She attended Pine Crest School in Fort Lauderdale, Florida, and trained for the swim club under head coach Jay Fitzgerald. On the same year, she won a silver medal in the 200 m butterfly at the European Junior Championships in Valletta, Malta (2:16.91). Two years later, in 2003, she enrolled on an academic and sports scholarship at the Georgia Institute of Technology in Atlanta, despite short preparation for her next Olympics.

At the 2004 Summer Olympics in Athens, Stojanovska extended her program, swimming in three individual events. She posted a FINA A-standard of 2:13.01 (200 m butterfly) from the European Championships in Madrid, Spain, allowing her to include 200 and 400 m freestyle in her event line-up. On the second day of the Games, Stojanovska placed twenty-seventh overall in the 400 m freestyle. Swimming in heat two, she cleared a 4:20 barrier by posting a time of 4:19.39 to take a fourth seed over Jamaica's Janelle Atkinson. The next day, she finished thirty-fourth overall behind Czech Republic's Jana Myšková by 0.02 of a second in the morning's heats of the 200 m freestyle with a time of 2:04.64. In her final event, 200 m butterfly, Stojanovska ended her Olympic run with a twenty-sixth-place effort, failing to reach the semifinals for the fifth straight time since 2000. Swimming in heat three, she rounded out a field of eight swimmers to last place with a time of 2:16.51, nearly four seconds off the national record held by Mirjana Boševska.

Shortly after her second Olympics, Stojanovska took a break from international swimming to focus on her studies. In 2007, she graduated from the Georgia Institute of Technology with a bachelor's degree in aerospace engineering, effectively ending her sporting career. Stojanovska also admitted that mathematics and science were her favorite subjects in high school, prompting her to pursue a college degree.
