= Eva Petrovska =

Macedonian swimmer

Personal information
- Nationality: Macedonian
- Born: 5 November 2004 (age 21)
- Height: 165 cm (5 ft 5 in)

Sport
- Sport: Swimming

Eva Petrovska (Macedonian: Ева Петровска; born 5 November 2004) is a Macedonian swimmer. She competed at the 2019, 2023 and 2024 World Aquatics Championships. She qualified to compete at the 2024 Summer Olympics but withdrew due to health issues.

== Career ==
Petrovska spends one week per month training in Austria to work with German coach Dirk Lange.

Petrovska represented North Macedonia at the 2019 World Aquatics Championships held in Gwangju, South Korea. She competed in the women's 800 metre freestyle and women's 1500 metre freestyle events. In both events, she did not advance to compete in the final, finishing 36th and 29th, respectively. She did set the national record in the 1500 metre freestyle with a time of 17:35.18.

Petrovska competed at the 2021 World Short-Course Championships and finished 38th in the 400 metre freestyle and 30th in the 800 metre freestyle. She won silver medals in the 400 and 800 metre freestyle events at the 2021 Serbian Open Swimming Championships. Then at the 2022 Serbian Open Swimming Championships, she set a new national record in the 1500 meter freestyle. She won a bronze medal in the 400 metre freestyle at the 2022 Ströck ATUS Graz Trophy.

Petrovska represented North Macedonia at the 2023 World Aquatics Championships and finished 35th in the 400 metre freestyle and 32nd in the 800 metre freestyle. She then competed at the 2024 World Aquatics Championships and finished 27th in the 400 metre freestyle and 24th in the 800 metre freestyle.

Petrovska qualified to represent North Macedonia at the 2024 Summer Olympics in the 800 metres freestyle. However, she had to withdraw due to health issues.
