= Jung Won-yong =

South Korean swimmer (born 1992)

Jung Won-Yong
Personal information
- Nationality: South Korea
- Born: 16 May 1992 (age 34) Gyeonggi-do, South Korea
- Height: 1.78 m (5 ft 10 in)
- Weight: 74 kg (163 lb)

Korean name
- Hangul: 정원용
- RR: Jeong Wonyong
- MR: Chŏng Wŏnyong

Sport
- Sport: Swimming
- Strokes: Freestyle, medley
- Club: Gyeonggi High School
Medal record
Men's swimming
Representing South Korea
Asian Games
Bronze medal – third place	2010 Guangzhou	4×100 m freestyle

Jung Won-yong (Korean: 정원용; born May 16, 1992, in Gyeonggi-do) is a South Korean swimmer, who specialized in freestyle and individual medley events. He won a bronze medal, as a member of the South Korean swimming team, in the 400 m freestyle relay at the 2010 Asian Games in Guangzhou, China.

Jung qualified for two swimming events at the 2012 Summer Olympics in London, by eclipsing FINA B-standard entry times of 2:02.50 (200 m individual medley) and 4:18.98 (400 m individual medley) from the FINA World Championships in Shanghai, China. In the 400 m individual medley, Jung challenged seven other swimmers on the second heat, including two-time Olympian Raphaël Stacchiotti of Luxembourg. He clinched a fifth spot and twenty-eighth overall by six hundredths of a second (0.06) behind Belarus' Yury Suvorau and Portugal's Diogo Carvalho, outside his entry time of 4:23.12. In his second event, 200 m individual medley, Jung edged out Ukrainian swimmer and double European junior champion Maksym Shemberev of Ukraine to claim a heat one victory by 0.07 of a second, with a time of 2:03.33. Jung failed to advance into the semifinals, as he placed thirty-second in the preliminary heats.
