= Anastasia Bogdanovski =

Macedonian swimmer (born 1993)

Personal information
- Born: 30 July 1993 (age 32)
- Height: 174 cm (5 ft 9 in)
- Weight: 57 kg (126 lb)

Sport
- Sport: Swimming
- Strokes: Freestyle
- College team: Johns Hopkins University

Anastasia Bogdanovski (born 30 July 1993) is a Macedonian swimmer. At the 2016 Summer Olympics, she competed in the women's 200 metre freestyle, finishing in 33rd place overall in the heats. Her time of 2:00.52 in the heat set a new Macedonian swimming record.

== College career ==
Bogdanovski competed at Johns Hopkins University from 2012 through 2015. She was named the NCAA Division III Women's Swimmer of the Year in 2014.

== Post-College career ==
Bogdanovski attended the Rutgers New Jersey Medical School and after graduating with the MD degree, she entered the general surgery residency program at Beth Israel Deaconess Medical Center.

Olympic Games
| Preceded by Marko Blaževski | Flagbearer for FYR Macedonia; Rio de Janeiro 2016 | Succeeded by Incumbent |
