= Flag of Macedonia =

Flag of Macedonia may refer to:

- Flag of Macedonia (Greece)
- Flag of North Macedonia
