= Nikola Ǵuretanoviḱ =

Macedonian swimmer (born 2007)

Personal information
- Nationality: Macedonian
- Born: 7 November 2007 (age 18) Skopje, Macedonia

Sport
- Sport: Swimming
- Club: Vardar 2018
- Coached by: Goran Stamenov

Nikola Ǵuretanoviḱ (Macedonian: Никола Ѓуретановиќ;, Serbian: Никола Ђуретановић; born 7 November 2007) is a Macedonian swimmer. He competed in the 2024 Summer Olympics.
