= Marko Blaževski =

Macedonian swimmer (born 1992)

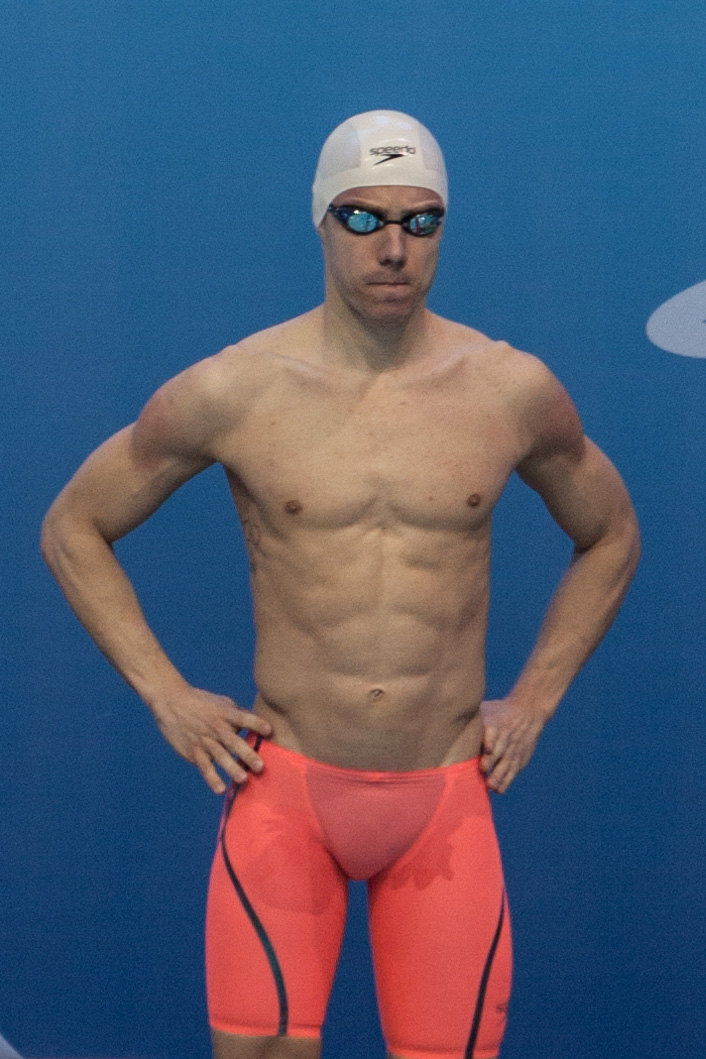
- Netanya 2015

Personal information
- Nationality: North Macedonia
- Born: 10 November 1992 (age 33) Skopje, Republic of Macedonia
- Height: 182 cm (6 ft 0 in)
- Weight: 77 kg (170 lb)

Sport
- Sport: Swimming
- Strokes: IM, Breastroke
- Club: PK Vardar, MBSC, SwimMac
- College team: Wingate University Bulldogs

Marko Blaževski (born 10 November 1992) is a Macedonian swimmer who competes in the Men's 400m individual medley. At the 2012 Summer Olympics he finished 34th overall in the heats in the Men's 400 metre individual medley and failed to reach the final. Additionally, at the 2016 Summer Olympics he finished 26th overall in the heats of the 200m Medley and broke the Macedonian National Record in the process, but did not reach the final.

Blaževski graduated from Wingate (N.C.) University, where he was a member of the men's swimming team from 2010 to 2014. He was the NCAA Division II national men's champion in the 400 m individual medley in 2011, 2012 and 2014.

Olympic Games
Preceded by Atanas Nikolovski	Flagbearer for FYR Macedonia; London 2012	Succeeded by Anastasija Bogdanovski
