= 2010 FINA World Swimming Championships (25 m) – Men's 100 metre backstroke =

Men's 100m Backstroke at the 2010 Short Course Worlds
- Dates: 15 December 2010 (heats and semifinals); 16 December 2010 (final)
- Competitors: 73
- Winning time: 49.07

Medalists
| gold medal | Stanislav Donets | Russia |
| silver medal | Camille Lacourt | France |
| bronze medal | Aschwin Wildeboer | Spain |

The Men's 100 Backstroke at the 10th FINA World Swimming Championships (25m) was swum 15–16 December 2010 in Dubai, United Arab Emirates. On 15 December, 73 individuals swam in the Preliminary heats in the morning, with the top-16 finishers advancing on to the Semifinals that evening. The top-8 finishers in the Semifinals then advanced on to the Final the next evening.

== Records ==
A the start of the event, the existing World (WR) and Championship records (CR) were:

| | Name | Nation | Time | Location | Date |
|---|---|---|---|---|---|
| WR | Nick Thoman | USA | 48.94 | Manchester | 18 December 2009 |
| CR | Ryan Lochte | USA | 49.99 | Shanghai | 9 April 2006 |

The following records were established during the competition:

| Date | Round | Name | Nation | Time | WR | CR |
|---|---|---|---|---|---|---|
| 15 December 2010 | Semifinals | Stanislav Donets | Russia | 49.62 | | CR |
| 16 December 2010 | Final | Stanislav Donets | Russia | 49.07 | | CR |

== Results ==
=== Prelims ===
| Rank | Heat | Lane | Name | Time | Notes |
|---|---|---|---|---|---|
| 1 | 10 | 4 | Stanislav Donets (RUS) | 50.18 | Q |
| 2 | 9 | 5 | Jérémy Stravius (FRA) | 50.63 | Q |
| 3 | 8 | 6 | David Plummer (USA) | 50.74 | Q |
| 4 | 8 | 2 | Nick Thoman (USA) | 50.93 | Q |
| 5 | 8 | 4 | Aschwin Wildeboer (ESP) | 51.03 | Q |
| 6 | 9 | 6 | Ryosuke Irie (JPN) | 51.32 | Q |
| 7 | 9 | 3 | Camille Lacourt (FRA) | 51.34 | Q |
| 8 | 10 | 3 | Damiano Lestingi (ITA) | 51.41 | Q |
| 9 | 6 | 6 | John Tapp (CAN) | 51.42 | Q |
| 10 | 9 | 4 | Arkady Vyatchanin (RUS) | 51.67 | Q |
| 11 | 1 | 4 | Guy Barnea (ISR) | 51.70 | Q |
| 12 | 8 | 5 | Guilherme Guido (BRA) | 51.74 | Q |
| 13 | 9 | 2 | Masafumi Yamaguchi (JPN) | 51.84 | Q |
| 14 | 10 | 1 | Cheng Feiyi (CHN) | 52.00 | Q |
| 15 | 8 | 3 | Nick Driebergen (NED) | 52.03 | Q |
| 16 | 9 | 8 | Omar Pinzón (COL) | 52.20 | Q |
| 17 | 10 | 6 | Mirco Di Tora (ITA) | 52.37 | |
| 18 | 7 | 6 | Vytautas Janušaitis (LTU) | 52.43 | |
| 19 | 10 | 5 | Radosław Kawęcki (POL) | 52.48 | |
| 20 | 8 | 7 | Stefa Herbst (GER) | 52.50 | |
| 21 | 9 | 7 | Benjamin Treffers (AUS) | 52.53 | |
| 22 | 7 | 3 | Charles Francis (CAN) | 52.62 | |
| 23 | 10 | 7 | Daniel Arnamnart (AUS) | 52.62 | |
| 24 | 10 | 8 | Pavel Sankovich (BLR) | 52.65 | |
| 25 | 10 | 2 | Andrejs Dūda (LAT) | 52.93 | |
| 26 | 9 | 1 | Jonatan Kopelev (ISR) | 52.98 | |
| 27 | 7 | 5 | He Jianbin (CHN) | 53.20 | |
| 28 | 8 | 1 | Leonardo de Deus (BRA) | 53.37 | |
| 29 | 7 | 4 | Andres Olvik (EST) | 53.68 | |
| 30 | 6 | 4 | Garth Virgil Tune (RSA) | 53.74 | |
| 31 | 7 | 2 | Federico Grabich (ARG) | 53.83 | |
| 32 | 8 | 8 | Lavrans Solli (NOR) | 53.98 | |
| 33 | 7 | 7 | Kristian Kron (SWE) | 54.16 | |
| 34 | 6 | 5 | Yuan Ping (TPE) | 54.50 | |
| 35 | 7 | 1 | Juan David Molina (COL) | 54.67 | |
| 36 | 6 | 7 | Mattias Carlsson (SWE) | 54.75 | |
| 37 | 7 | 8 | Serghei Golban (MDA) | 54.85 | |
| 38 | 5 | 5 | Lin Yu-An (TPE) | 54.92 | |
| 39 | 5 | 2 | Sergey Pankov (UZB) | 55.00 | |
| 40 | 5 | 8 | Raphaël Stacchiotti (LUX) | 55.18 | |
| 41 | 6 | 8 | Charles Hockin (PAR) | 55.29 | |
| 42 | 5 | 6 | Mohamed Hussein (EGY) | 55.38 | |
| 43 | 6 | 3 | Jean-François Schneiders (LUX) | 55.43 | |
| 44 | 6 | 2 | Abdullah Altuwaini (KUW) | 55.71 | |
| 45 | 4 | 4 | Charles William Walker (PHI) | 55.73 | |
| 46 | 5 | 7 | Alex Hernández Medina (CUB) | 55.77 | |
| 47 | 6 | 1 | Taki Mrabet (TUN) | 56.14 | |
| 48 | 4 | 3 | Mauricio Fiol (PER) | 56.43 | |
| 49 | 3 | 3 | Nicholas James (ZIM) | 56.55 | |
| 50 | 4 | 8 | Jean Luis Apolinar Gómez Nuñez (DOM) | 56.95 | |
| 51 | 4 | 5 | Amine Kouame (MAR) | 57.49 | |
| 52 | 5 | 4 | Kevin Kan Yin Chu (HKG) | 57.55 | |
| 53 | 4 | 6 | Shuaib Althuwaini (KUW) | 57.97 | |
| 54 | 5 | 1 | Tong Antonio (MAC) | 58.15 | |
| 55 | 3 | 2 | Alar Lodi (EST) | 58.58 | |
| 56 | 4 | 2 | Mohammed Al Ghaferi (UAE) | 58.63 | |
| 57 | 3 | 4 | Boris Kirillov (AZE) | 58.77 | |
| 58 | 3 | 6 | Mark Sammut (MLT) | 58.86 | |
| 59 | 4 | 7 | Ngou Pok Man (MAC) | 59.28 | |
| 60 | 2 | 7 | Alkulaibi Aiman (OMA) | 59.39 | |
| 61 | 3 | 5 | Ali Al Kaabi (UAE) | 59.71 | |
| 62 | 4 | 1 | Giorgi Mtvralashvili (GEO) | 1:00.37 | |
| 63 | 2 | 4 | Ali Ahmed (BRN) | 1:03.61 | |
| 64 | 3 | 1 | Nuno Miguel Rola (ANG) | 1:03.78 | |
| 65 | 3 | 8 | Dulguun Batsaikhan (MGL) | 1:04.12 | |
| 66 | 2 | 5 | Saif Alaslam Saeed Al-Saadi (IRQ) | 1:04.25 | |
| 67 | 3 | 7 | Hamdan Iqbal Bayusuf (KEN) | 1:04.32 | |
| 68 | 2 | 2 | Roman Hramtsov (TKM) | 1:06.39 | |
| 69 | 2 | 3 | Mohamed Bahrin Shah Behrom Shem (BRU) | 1:08.44 | |
| 70 | 1 | 3 | Hilal Hemed Hilal (TAN) | 1:11.23 | |
| 71 | 2 | 6 | Tano Pierre Claver Atta (CIV) | 1:13.43 | |
| - | 1 | 5 | Kouassi Franck Olivier Brou (CIV) | DNS | |
| - | 5 | 3 | Khachik Plavchyan (ARM) | DNS | |

=== Semifinals ===
Semifinal 1

| Rank | Lane | Name | Time | Notes |
|---|---|---|---|---|
| 1 | 5 | Nick Thoman (USA) | 50.69 | Q |
| 2 | 4 | Jérémy Stravius (FRA) | 50.75 | Q |
| 3 | 7 | Guilherme Guido (BRA) | 50.83 | Q |
| 4 | 3 | Ryosuke Irie (JPN) | 50.98 | Q |
| 5 | 6 | Damiano Lestingi (ITA) | 50.99 | |
| 6 | 2 | Arkady Vyatchanin (RUS) | 51.11 | |
| 7 | 1 | Cheng Feiyi (CHN) | 51.81 | |
| - | 8 | Omar Pinzón (COL) | | DNS |

Semifinal 2

| Rank | Lane | Name | Time | Notes |
|---|---|---|---|---|
| 1 | 4 | Stanislav Donets (RUS) | 49.62 | Q, CR |
| 2 | 6 | Camille Lacourt (FRA) | 50.53 | Q |
| 3 | 3 | Aschwin Wildeboer (ESP) | 50.90 | Q |
| 4 | 5 | David Plummer (USA) | 50.94 | Q |
| 5 | 2 | John Tapp (CAN) | 51.48 | |
| 6 | 8 | Nick Driebergen (NED) | 51.86 | |
| 7 | 7 | Guy Barnea (ISR) | 51.92 | |
| 8 | 1 | Masafumi Yamaguchi (JPN) | 52.13 | |

=== Final ===
| Rank | Lane | Name | Time | Notes |
|---|---|---|---|---|
| 1st place, gold medalist(s) | 4 | Stanislav Donets (RUS) | 49.07 | CR |
| 2nd place, silver medalist(s) | 5 | Camille Lacourt (FRA) | 49.80 | |
| 3rd place, bronze medalist(s) | 7 | Aschwin Wildeboer (ESP) | 50.04 | |
| 4 | 3 | Nick Thoman (USA) | 50.38 | |
| 5 | 8 | Ryosuke Irie (JPN) | 50.55 | |
| 6 | 1 | David Plummer (USA) | 50.59 | |
| 7 | 6 | Jérémy Stravius (FRA) | 50.79 | |
| 8 | 2 | Guilherme Guido (BRA) | 50.91 | |
