= 2012 FINA World Swimming Championships (25 m) – Men's 100 metre backstroke =

Men's 100m Backstroke at the 2012 Short Course Worlds
- Dates: 12 December (heats and semifinals); 13 December (final)
- Winning time: 49.89

Medalists
| gold medal | Matt Grevers | United States |
| silver medal | Stanislav Donets | Russia |
| bronze medal | Guilherme Guido | Brazil |

The men's 100 metre backstroke event at the 11th FINA World Swimming Championships (25m) took place 12 – 13 December 2012 at the Sinan Erdem Dome.

== Records ==
Prior to this competition, the existing world and championship records were as follows.

| | Name | Nation | Time | Location | Date |
|---|---|---|---|---|---|
| World record | Nick Thoman | United States | 48.94 | Manchester | 18 December 2009 |
| Championship record | Stanislav Donets | Russia | 48.95 | Dubai | 19 December 2010 |

No new records were set during this competition.

== Results ==
=== Heats ===
| Rank | Heat | Lane | Name | Time | Notes |
|---|---|---|---|---|---|
| 1 | 5 | 4 | Robert Hurley (AUS) | 50.22 | Q |
| 2 | 6 | 4 | Matt Grevers (USA) | 50.55 | Q |
| 3 | 7 | 4 | Stanislav Donets (RUS) | 50.83 | Q |
| 4 | 6 | 5 | Guilherme Guido (BRA) | 51.14 | Q |
| 5 | 5 | 5 | Aschwin Wildeboer (ESP) | 51.19 | Q |
| 5 | 7 | 3 | Ashley Delaney (AUS) | 51.19 | Q |
| 7 | 4 | 6 | Guy Barnea (ISR) | 51.30 | Q, NR |
| 8 | 6 | 3 | Kosuke Hagino (JPN) | 51.40 | Q |
| 9 | 7 | 6 | Pavel Sankovich (BLR) | 51.48 | Q |
| 10 | 7 | 5 | Radosław Kawęcki (POL) | 51.51 | Q |
| 11 | 6 | 2 | Péter Bernek (HUN) | 51.55 | Q |
| 12 | 7 | 7 | Iskender Baslakov (TUR) | 51.56 | Q |
| 13 | 6 | 6 | Damiano Lestingi (ITA) | 51.58 | Q |
| 14 | 7 | 2 | Christian Diener (GER) | 51.61 | Q |
| 15 | 6 | 7 | Mirco Di Tora (ITA) | 51.69 | Q |
| 16 | 5 | 2 | Cheng Feiyi (CHN) | 51.70 | Q |
| 17 | 7 | 8 | Jonatan Kopelev (ISR) | 51.82 | |
| 18 | 5 | 6 | Daniel Orzechowski (BRA) | 51.89 | |
| 19 | 5 | 3 | Yuki Shirai (JPN) | 51.99 | |
| 20 | 6 | 8 | Darren Murray (RSA) | 52.09 | |
| 21 | 7 | 0 | Chris Walker-Hebborn (GBR) | 52.11 | |
| 22 | 1 | 1 | Alexandr Tarabrin (KAZ) | 52.17 | |
| 23 | 5 | 8 | Ben Hesen (USA) | 52.19 | |
| 24 | 1 | 8 | Xu Jiayu (CHN) | 52.21 | |
| 25 | 7 | 1 | Andrei Shabasov (RUS) | 52.22 | |
| 26 | 5 | 1 | Corey Main (NZL) | 52.60 | |
| 27 | 6 | 1 | Lavrans Solli (NOR) | 52.66 | |
| 28 | 5 | 7 | Alexis Santos (POR) | 52.74 | |
| 29 | 5 | 0 | Tomasz Polewka (POL) | 53.03 | |
| 30 | 6 | 0 | Dorian Gandin (FRA) | 53.35 | |
| 31 | 6 | 9 | Güven Duvan (TUR) | 53.45 | |
| 32 | 4 | 4 | Garth Tune (RSA) | 53.68 | |
| 33 | 4 | 2 | Martin Zhelev (BUL) | 53.89 | NR |
| 34 | 4 | 9 | Charles Hockin (PAR) | 54.00 | |
| 35 | 5 | 9 | Lukas Räuftlin (SUI) | 54.08 | |
| 36 | 4 | 5 | Quah Zheng Wen (SIN) | 54.70 | NR |
| 37 | 7 | 9 | Gábor Balog (HUN) | 54.74 | |
| 38 | 4 | 7 | Jake Tapp (CAN) | 54.96 | |
| 39 | 4 | 0 | Danas Rapšys (LTU) | 55.08 | |
| 40 | 3 | 5 | Armando Barrera Aira (CUB) | 55.15 | |
| 41 | 4 | 3 | Ng Kai Wee Rainer (SIN) | 55.20 | |
| 42 | 4 | 8 | Rostislav Kubicky (SVK) | 55.22 | |
| 43 | 3 | 4 | Timothy Wynter (JAM) | 55.55 | |
| 44 | 3 | 3 | Jean Luis Gómez (DOM) | 55.64 | NR |
| 45 | 3 | 9 | Awse Ma'aya (JOR) | 56.16 | |
| 46 | 3 | 7 | Boris Kirillov (AZE) | 56.32 | |
| 47 | 3 | 6 | Yeziel Morales (PUR) | 56.95 | |
| 48 | 2 | 4 | Ngou Pok Man (MAC) | 57.19 | |
| 49 | 3 | 1 | Jamal Chavoshifar (IRI) | 58.26 | |
| 50 | 3 | 0 | Rohit Imoliya (IND) | 58.96 | |
| 51 | 2 | 3 | Roy Barahona (HON) | 59.15 | |
| 52 | 2 | 1 | Samson Opuakpo (NGR) | 59.17 | |
| 53 | 3 | 2 | Mohammed Al-Ghafri (UAE) | 59.50 | |
| 54 | 3 | 8 | Nicholas Coard (GRN) | 59.82 | |
| 55 | 2 | 2 | David van der Colff (BOT) | 1:00.28 | |
| 56 | 2 | 6 | Sio Kin Hei (MAC) | 1:01.34 | |
| 57 | 2 | 7 | Pablo Feo (AND) | 1:01.65 | |
| 58 | 2 | 8 | Erdenemunkh Demuul (MGL) | 1:02.08 | |
| 59 | 2 | 5 | Rahul Monal Chokshi (IND) | 1:02.73 | |
| 60 | 2 | 9 | Hilal Hemed Hilal (TAN) | 1:05.37 | |
| 61 | 2 | 0 | Faraj Farhan (BHR) | 1:06.85 | |
| 62 | 1 | 4 | Brandon Schuster (SAM) | 1:09.34 | |
| 63 | 1 | 5 | Storm Halbich (VIN) | 1:21.02 | |
| 64 | 1 | 3 | Nikolas Sylvester (VIN) | 1:25.77 | |
| | 4 | 1 | Daniel Ramirez Carranza (MEX) | DSQ | |
| | 1 | 6 | Rhudi Ayi Mensah Quaye (GHA) | DNS | |
| | 1 | 7 | Luis Rafael Rojas Martinez (VEN) | DNS | |

=== Semifinals ===
| Rank | Heat | Lane | Name | Nationality | Time | Notes |
|---|---|---|---|---|---|---|
| 1 | 2 | 5 | Stanislav Donets | Russia | 49.98 | Q |
| 2 | 1 | 4 | Matt Grevers | United States | 50.24 | Q |
| 3 | 1 | 3 | Ashley Delaney | Australia | 50.66 | Q |
| 4 | 2 | 4 | Robert Hurley | Australia | 50.70 | Q |
| 5 | 1 | 7 | Iskender Baslakov | Turkey | 50.77 | Q, NR |
| 6 | 1 | 2 | Radosław Kawęcki | Poland | 50.88 | Q |
| 7 | 1 | 5 | Guilherme Guido | Brazil | 50.98 | Q |
| 8 | 1 | 1 | Christian Diener | Germany | 51.06 | Q |
| 9 | 2 | 6 | Guy Barnea | Israel | 51.12 | NR |
| 10 | 2 | 3 | Aschwin Wildeboer | Spain | 51.16 | |
| 11 | 2 | 7 | Péter Bernek | Hungary | 51.42 | |
| 12 | 1 | 8 | Cheng Feiyi | China | 51.43 | |
| 13 | 2 | 2 | Pavel Sankovich | Belarus | 51.47 | |
| 13 | 2 | 8 | Mirco Di Tora | Italy | 51.47 | |
| 15 | 1 | 6 | Kosuke Hagino | Japan | 51.56 | |
| 16 | 2 | 1 | Damiano Lestingi | Italy | 51.63 | |

=== Final ===
The final was held at 19:24.

| Rank | Lane | Name | Nationality | Time | Notes |
|---|---|---|---|---|---|
| 1st place, gold medalist(s) | 5 | Matt Grevers | United States | 49.89 | |
| 2nd place, silver medalist(s) | 4 | Stanislav Donets | Russia | 49.91 | |
| 3rd place, bronze medalist(s) | 1 | Guilherme Guido | Brazil | 50.50 | |
| 4 | 3 | Ashley Delaney | Australia | 50.61 | |
| 5 | 6 | Robert Hurley | Australia | 50.63 | |
| 6 | 7 | Radosław Kawęcki | Poland | 50.75 | |
| 7 | 2 | Iskender Baslakov | Turkey | 50.76 | NR |
| 8 | 8 | Christian Diener | Germany | 51.27 | |
