= 2010 FINA World Swimming Championships (25 m) – Men's 50 metre backstroke =

Men's 50m Backstroke at the 2010 Short Course Worlds
- Dates: 17 December 2010 (heats and semifinals); 18 December 2010 (final)
- Competitors: 76
- Winning time: 22.93

Medalists
| gold medal | Stanislav Donets | Russia |
| silver medal | Sun Xiaolei | China |
| silver medal | Aschwin Wildeboer | Spain |

The Men's 50 Backstroke at the 10th FINA World Swimming Championships (25m) was swum 17–18 December 2010 in Dubai, United Arab Emirates. In the morning session of 17 December, 76 individuals swam in the Preliminary heats, with the top-16 swimmers advancing to swim again in the Semifinals that evening. The top-8 finishers in the Semifinals then advanced to the Final the next evening.

== Records ==
At the start of the event, the existing World (WR) and Championship records (CR) were:

| | Name | Nation | Time | Location | Date |
|---|---|---|---|---|---|
| WR | Peter Marshall | United States | 22.61 | Singapore | 12 November 2009 |
| CR | Liam Tancock | United Kingdom | 23.41 | Manchester | 11 April 2008 |

The following records were established during the competition:

| Date | Round | Name | Nation | Time | WR | CR |
|---|---|---|---|---|---|---|
| 17 December 2010 | Heats | Stanislav Donets | Russia | 23.24 | | CR |
| 17 December 2010 | Semifinals | Stanislav Donets | Russia | 23.02 | | CR |
| 18 December 2010 | Final | Stanislav Donets | Russia | 22.93 | | CR |

== Results ==
=== Heats ===
| Rank | Heat | Lane | Name | Time | Notes |
|---|---|---|---|---|---|
| 1 | 10 | 4 | Stanislav Donets (RUS) | 23.24 | Q, CR |
| 2 | 1 | 3 | Sun Xiaolei (CHN) | 23.41 | Q |
| 3 | 10 | 2 | Nick Thoman (USA) | 23.49 | Q |
| 4 | 10 | 3 | Aschwin Wildeboer (ESP) | 23.66 | Q |
| 5 | 8 | 3 | Benjamin Treffers (AUS) | 23.73 | Q |
| 6 | 9 | 4 | Jérémy Stravius (FRA) | 23.75 | Q |
| 7 | 9 | 3 | Camille Lacourt (FRA) | 23.78 | Q |
| 8 | 8 | 2 | David Plummer (USA) | 23.88 | Q |
| 8 | 10 | 5 | Guilherme Guido (BRA) | 23.88 | Q |
| 10 | 8 | 6 | Stefan Herbst (GER) | 23.98 | Q |
| 11 | 8 | 4 | Mirco Di Tora (ITA) | 24.01 | Q |
| 12 | 9 | 5 | Damiano Lestingi (ITA) | 24.07 | Q |
| 13 | 2 | 7 | Guy Barnea (ISR) | 24.09 | Q |
| 14 | 10 | 1 | Pavel Sankovich (BLR) | 24.16 | Q |
| 15 | 6 | 3 | John Tapp (CAN) | 24.20 | Q |
| 15 | 9 | 6 | Arkady Vyatchanin (RUS) | 24.20 | Q |
| 17 | 9 | 2 | Masafumi Yamaguchi (JPN) | 24.22 | |
| 18 | 6 | 6 | Albert Subirats (VEN) | 24.23 | |
| 19 | 9 | 1 | Jonatan Kopelev (ISR) | 24.28 | |
| 20 | 7 | 3 | Ryosuke Irie (JPN) | 24.32 | |
| 21 | 10 | 8 | Omar Pinzón (COL) | 24.33 | |
| 22 | 8 | 5 | Nicolaas Driebergen (NED) | 24.36 | |
| 23 | 10 | 6 | Radosław Kawęcki (POL) | 24.61 | |
| 24 | 10 | 7 | Daniel Arnamnart (AUS) | 24.67 | |
| 25 | 7 | 1 | Lin Yu-An (TPE) | 24.76 | |
| 26 | 8 | 7 | Garth Virgil Tune (RSA) | 24.79 | |
| 27 | 9 | 7 | Andrejs Dūda (LAT) | 24.88 | |
| 28 | 8 | 1 | Lavrans Solli (NOR) | 24.92 | |
| 29 | 7 | 4 | Juan David Molina (COL) | 24.97 | |
| 30 | 7 | 6 | He Jianbin (CHN) | 25.16 | |
| 31 | 6 | 7 | Yuan Ping (TPE) | 25.23 | |
| 31 | 7 | 2 | Sverre Naess (NOR) | 25.23 | |
| 33 | 1 | 6 | Charles William Walker (PHI) | 25.38 | |
| 33 | 9 | 8 | Fabio Santi (BRA) | 25.38 | |
| 35 | 7 | 5 | Federico Grabich (ARG) | 25.50 | |
| 36 | 6 | 5 | Serghei Golban (MDA) | 25.53 | |
| 37 | 7 | 7 | Andres Olvik (EST) | 25.55 | |
| 38 | 4 | 6 | Alex Hernandez Medina (CUB) | 25.61 | |
| 39 | 6 | 1 | Charles Hockin (PAR) | 25.69 | |
| 40 | 4 | 5 | Mattias Carlsson (SWE) | 25.72 | |
| 41 | 5 | 4 | Kristian Kron (SWE) | 25.76 | |
| 41 | 6 | 2 | Abdullah Altuwaini (KUW) | 25.76 | |
| 43 | 6 | 4 | Jean-François Schneiders (LUX) | 25.82 | |
| 44 | 5 | 2 | Raphaël Stacchiotti (LUX) | 25.85 | |
| 45 | 8 | 8 | Charles Francis (CAN) | 25.87 | |
| 46 | 7 | 8 | Sergey Pankov (UZB) | 25.88 | |
| 47 | 5 | 3 | Mohamed Hussein (EGY) | 26.20 | |
| 48 | 5 | 1 | Mohammed Al Ghaferi (UAE) | 26.33 | |
| 49 | 6 | 8 | Tong Antonio (MAC) | 26.35 | |
| 50 | 4 | 4 | Nicholas James (ZIM) | 26.52 | |
| 51 | 5 | 6 | Jean Luis Gomez Nuñez (DOM) | 26.55 | |
| 52 | 5 | 7 | Amine Kouame (MAR) | 26.81 | |
| 53 | 5 | 8 | Shuaib Althuwaini (KUW) | 26.86 | |
| 54 | 4 | 3 | Boris Kirillov (AZE) | 27.11 | |
| 55 | 4 | 2 | Saeed Malekae Ashtiani (IRI) | 27.17 | |
| 56 | 4 | 1 | Ngou Pok Man (MAC) | 27.48 | |
| 57 | 4 | 7 | Mark Sammut (MLT) | 28.01 | |
| 58 | 2 | 6 | Alkulaibi Aiman (OMA) | 28.03 | |
| 59 | 3 | 4 | Ali Ahmed (BRN) | 29.09 | |
| 60 | 3 | 5 | Dulguun Batsaikhan (MGL) | 29.16 | |
| 61 | 3 | 7 | Nuno Miguel Rola (ANG) | 29.31 | |
| 62 | 4 | 8 | Hamdan Iqbal Bayusuf (KEN) | 29.47 | |
| 63 | 3 | 3 | Saif Alaslam Saeed Al-Saadi (IRQ) | 29.60 | |
| 64 | 3 | 1 | Roman Hramtsov (TKM) | 30.10 | |
| 65 | 3 | 6 | Mohamed Bahrin Behrom Shem (BRU) | 30.81 | |
| 66 | 1 | 5 | Zin Maung Htet (MYA) | 31.76 | |
| 67 | 2 | 3 | Hilal Hemed Hilal (TAN) | 31.93 | |
| 68 | 3 | 8 | Belete Fiseha Hailu (ETH) | 31.99 | |
| 69 | 3 | 2 | Tano Pierre Claver Atta (CIV) | 32.68 | |
| 70 | 2 | 8 | Inayath Hassan (MDV) | 34.04 | |
| 71 | 2 | 4 | Giordan Harris (MHL) | 35.02 | |
| 72 | 2 | 5 | Renis Krisafi (ALB) | 38.18 | |
| - | 1 | 4 | Ben Owusu Martinsom (GHA) | DNS | |
| - | 2 | 1 | Derya Büyükuncu (TUR) | DNS | |
| - | 2 | 2 | Kwame Apenteng (GHA) | DNS | |
| - | 5 | 5 | Khachik Plavchyan (ARM) | DNS | |

=== Semifinals ===
Semifinal 1

| Rank | Lane | Name | Time | Notes |
|---|---|---|---|---|
| 1 | 4 | Sun Xiaolei (CHN) | 23.23 | Q |
| 2 | 5 | Aschwin Wildeboer (ESP) | 23.44 | Q |
| 3 | 3 | Jérémy Stravius (FRA) | 23.74 | Q |
| 4 | 6 | David Plummer (USA) | 23.86 | |
| 5 | 7 | Damiano Lestingi (ITA) | 23.96 | |
| 6 | 2 | Stefan Herbst (GER) | 24.01 | |
| 7 | 1 | Pavel Sankovich (BLR) | 24.10 | |
| 8 | 8 | Arkady Vyatchanin (RUS) | 24.23 | |

Semifinal 2

| Rank | Lane | Name | Time | Notes |
|---|---|---|---|---|
| 1 | 4 | Stanislav Donets (RUS) | 23.02 | Q, CR |
| 2 | 6 | Camille Lacourt (FRA) | 23.37 | Q |
| 3 | 2 | Guilherme Guido (BRA) | 23.53 | Q |
| 3 | 5 | Nick Thoman (USA) | 23.53 | Q |
| 5 | 3 | Benjamin Treffers (AUS) | 23.63 | Q |
| 6 | 7 | Mirco Di Tora (ITA) | 23.93 | |
| 6 | 1 | Guy Barnea (ISR) | 23.93 | |
| 8 | 8 | John Tapp (CAN) | 23.96 | |

=== Final ===
| Rank | Lane | Name | Time | Notes |
|---|---|---|---|---|
| 1st place, gold medalist(s) | 4 | Stanislav Donets (RUS) | 22.93 | CR |
| 2nd place, silver medalist(s) | 5 | Sun Xiaolei (CHN) | 23.13 | |
| 2nd place, silver medalist(s) | 6 | Aschwin Wildeboer (ESP) | 23.13 | |
| 4 | 3 | Camille Lacourt (FRA) | 23.16 | |
| 5 | 7 | Nick Thoman (USA) | 23.28 | |
| 6 | 2 | Guilherme Guido (BRA) | 23.39 | |
| 7 | 8 | Jérémy Stravius (FRA) | 23.53 | |
| 8 | 1 | Benjamin Treffers (AUS) | 23.68 | |
