= 2010 FINA World Swimming Championships (25 m) – Men's 200 metre backstroke =

Men's 200m Backstroke at the 2010 Short Course Worlds
- Dates: 19 December 2010
- Competitors: 51
- Winning time: 1:46.68

Medalists
gold medal	Ryan Lochte	United States
silver medal	Tyler Clary	United States
bronze medal	Markus Rogan	Austria

The Men's 200 Backstroke at the 10th FINA World Swimming Championships (25 m) was swum 19 December 2010 in Dubai, United Arab Emirates. 51 individuals swam in the Preliminary heats in the morning, with the top-8 finishers advancing to swim again in the Final that evening.

At the start of the event, the existing World (WR) and Championship records (CR) were as follows.

	Name	Nation	Time	Location	Date
WR	Arkady Vyatchanin	Russia	1:46.11	Berlin	15 November 2009
CR	Markus Rogan	Austria	1:47.84	Manchester	13 April 2008

The following records were established during the competition:

Date	Round	Name	Nation	Time	WR	CR
19 December 2010	Final	Ryan Lochte	United States	1:46.68		CR

== Results ==
=== Heats ===
Rank	Heat	Lane	Name	Time	Notes
1	6	5	Ryan Lochte (USA)	1:50.25	Q
2	7	3	Tyler Clary (USA)	1:50.82	Q
3	5	3	Aschwin Wildeboer (ESP)	1:51.63	Q
4	5	4	Markus Rogan (AUT)	1:51.82	Q
5	7	5	Ryosuke Irie (JPN)	1:51.85	Q
6	6	4	Radosław Kawęcki (POL)	1:51.90	Q
7	6	3	Damiano Lestingi (ITA)	1:52.02	Q
8	3	4	John Tapp (CAN)	1:52.15	Q, NR
9	6	6	Omar Pinzón (COL)	1:52.34	SA
10	7	4	Arkady Vyatchanin (RUS)	1:52.62	
11	5	5	Benjamin Stasiulis (FRA)	1:52.77	
12	5	2	Nicolaas Driebergen (NED)	1:53.65	
13	7	6	Derya Büyükuncu (TUR)	1:54.07	
14	1	4	Guy Barnea (ISR)	1:54.23	
15	1	3	Zhang Fenglin (CHN)	1:54.65	
16	5	7	Charles Francis (CAN)	1:54.82	
17	7	7	Kristian Kron (SWE)	1:55.67	
18	7	2	Fabio Santi (BRA)	1:56.24	
19	7	1	Andres Olvik (EST)	1:56.36	NR
20	7	8	Mattias Carlsson (SWE)	1:56.77	
21	6	1	Jonatan Kopelev (ISR)	1:57.05	
22	4	8	Sergey Pankov (UZB)	1:58.28	
23	5	1	Lavrans Solli (NOR)	1:59.00	
24	5	8	Jean-François Schneiders (LUX)	1:59.12	
25	4	4	Federico Grabich (ARG)	1:59.42	
26	3	5	Mohamed Hussein (EGY)	1:59.57	
27	1	5	Andrejs Dūda (LAT)	1:59.65	
28	6	8	Juan David Molina (COL)	1:59.97	
29	4	6	Lin Shih-Chieh (TPE)	2:00.08	
30	4	7	Abdullah Altuwaini (KUW)	2:00.92	
31	4	5	Charles Hockin (PAR)	2:01.66	
32	3	7	Rehan Jehangir Poncha (IND)	2:02.52	
33	3	3	Alex Hernández Medina (CUB)	2:02.95	
34	4	2	Chu Kevin Kam Yin (HKG)	2:04.19	
35	3	2	Jean Luis Apolinar Gomez Nuñez (DOM)	2:04.26	
36	4	3	Oleg Rabota (KAZ)	2:04.89	
37	2	3	Alar Lodi (EST)	2:04.99	
38	6	7	Cheng Feiyi (CHN)	2:06.25	
39	3	8	Shuaib Althuwaini (KUW)	2:06.30	
40	2	4	Nicholas James (ZIM)	2:06.61	
41	3	1	Boris Kirillov (AZE)	2:07.01	
42	2	5	Morad Berrada (MAR)	2:07.18	
43	2	6	Mark Sammut (MLT)	2:07.60	
44	3	6	Ngou Pok Man (MAC)	2:08.65	
45	2	2	Mohammed Al Ghaferi (UAE)	2:08.92	
46	2	7	Edward Caruana Dingli (MLT)	2:11.11	
–	2	1	Hamdan Iqbal Bayusuf (KEN)	DNS	
–	2	8	Daniel Arnamnart (AUS)	DNS	
–	4	1	Khachik Plavchyan (ARM)	DNS	
–	5	6	Camille Lacourt (FRA)	DNS	
–	6	2	Květoslav Svoboda (CZE)	DNS	

=== Final ===
Rank	Lane	Name	Time	Notes
1st place, gold medalist(s)	4	Ryan Lochte (USA)	1:46.68	CR
2nd place, silver medalist(s)	5	Tyler Clary (USA)	1:49.09	
3rd place, bronze medalist(s)	6	Markus Rogan (AUT)	1:49.96	
4	3	Aschwin Wildeboer (ESP)	1:50.01	
5	2	Ryosuke Irie (JPN)	1:50.18	
6	7	Radosław Kawęcki (POL)	1:50.90	
7	8	John Tapp (CAN)	1:52.56	
–	1	Damiano Lestingi (ITA)		DSQ
