= 2012 FINA World Swimming Championships (25 m) – Men's 4 × 100 metre medley relay =

Men's 4 × 100 m Medley Relay at the 2012 Short Course Worlds
- Dates: 16 December (heats and final)
- Winning time: 3:21.03

Medalists
gold medal	United States; Matt Grevers, Kevin Cordes, Tom Shields, Ryan Lochte, Ryan Murphy*, Mihail Alexandrov*, Anthony Ervin*
silver medal	Russia; Stanislav Donets, Viatcheslav Sinkevich, Nikolay Skvortsov, Vladimir Morozov, Viacheslav Prudnikov*, Yevgeny Lagunov*
bronze medal	Australia; Robert Hurley, Kenneth To, Grant Irvine, Tommaso D'Orsogna, Kyle Richardson*; *Indicates the swimmer only competed in the preliminary heats.

The men's 4 × 100 metre medley relay event at the 11th FINA World Swimming Championships (25m) took place 16 December 2012 at the Sinan Erdem Dome.

== Records ==
Prior to this competition, the existing world and championship records were as follows.

	Nation	Swimmers	Time	Location	Date
World record	Russia	Stanislav Donets (49.63); Sergey Geybel (56.43); Yevgeny Korotyshkin (48.35); Danila Izotov (44.75)	3:19.16	Saint Petersburg	20 December 2009
Championship record	United States	Nick Thoman (49.88); Mihail Alexandrov (56.52); Ryan Lochte (49.17); Garrett Weber-Gale (45.42)	3:20.99	Dubai	19 December 2010

No new records were set during this competition.

== Results ==
=== Heats ===
Rank	Heat	Lane	Nation	Swimmers	Time	Notes
1	3	4	United States	Ryan Murphy (50.91); Mihail Alexandrov (57.36); Tom Shields (50.91); Anthony Ervin (46.42)	3:25.60	Q
2	3	5	Russia	Stanislav Donets (49.96); Viatcheslav Sinkevich (57.98); Viacheslav Prudnikov (51.35); Yevgeny Lagunov (46.44)	3:25.73	Q
3	1	4	Australia	Robert Hurley (50.74); Kenneth To (57.63); Grant Irvine (51.58); Kyle Richardson (47.23)	3:27.18	Q
4	2	4	Brazil	Daniel Orzechowski (52.13); João Gomes Jr. (58.04); Kaio de Almeida (50.11); Guilherme Roth (47.21)	3:27.49	Q
5	1	1	Hungary	Péter Bernek (52.15); Dániel Gyurta (57.42); Bence Pulai (51.22); Dominik Kozma (47.47)	3:28.26	Q
6	3	8	Italy	Mirco Di Tora (51.78); Mattia Pesce (58.89); Matteo Rivolta (50.92); Marco Orsi (46.93)	3:28.52	Q, NR
7	1	7	China	Cheng Feiyi (51.76); Li Xiayan (58.49); Wu Peng (51.25); Lü Zhiwu (47.49)	3:28.99	Q
8	2	5	Japan	Yuki Shirai (52.18); Koichiro Okazaki (58.83); Takuro Fujii (51.25); Kenta Ito (46.74)	3:29.00	Q
9	1	3	South Africa	Darren Murray (52.62); Giulio Zorzi (59.36); Garth Tune (52.70); Leith Shankland (47.29)	3:31.97	AF
10	1	5	Israel	Jonatan Kopelev (52.19); Gal Nevo (58.76); Alon Mandel (52.80); Guy Barnea (48.68)	3:32.43	
11	2	1	Great Britain	Chris Walker-Hebborn (52.29); Craig Benson (58.10); Ieuan Lloyd (53.34); Robert Renwick (48.91)	3:32.64	
12	3	7	Belarus	Pavel Sankovich (52.69); Viktar Vabishchevich (1:00.14); Yauhen Tsurkin (51.41); Arseni Kukharau (48.66)	3:32.90	NR
13	2	7	Canada	Jake Tapp (53.30); Andrew Poznikoff (59.36); Coleman Allen (52.77); Thomas Gossland (48.10)	3:33.53	
14	2	3	Turkey	Iskender Baslakov (52.03); Mustafa Kacmaz (1:01.27); Nurettin Yildir Erhan (53.76); Kemal Arda Gürdal (47.00)	3:34.06	NR
15	3	3	Paraguay	Charles Hockin Brusquetti (54.15); Genaro Prono (1:02.45); Jose Emmanuel Lobo Martinez (54.11); Ben Hockin (47.71)	3:38.42	
16	2	6	Singapore	Quah Zheng Wen (54.84); Lionel Khoo (1:01.46); Joseph Schooling (53.02); Ng Kai Wee Rainer (51.24)	3:40.56	
17	3	2	Peru	Mauricio Fiol (55.98/NR); Enrique Duran Garcia-Bedoya (1:03.59); Emmanuel Crescimbeni (53.72); Jusuf Nikola Ustavdich Velez (51.25)	3:44.54	NR
18	1	6	India	Rohit Imoliya (59.58); Agnishwar Jayaprakash (1:02.50); Sarma Nair (57.19); Neil Himanshu Contractor (54.06)	3:53.33	
19	3	6	Macau	Ngou Pok Man (56.44); Chao Man Hou (1:02.95); Lao Kuan Fong (58.69); Sio Ka Kun (56.66)	3:54.74	
20	1	2	Bahrain	Faraj Farhan (1:05.27); Omar Yousif (1:07.97); Khalid Baba (1:02.67); Farhan Farhan (57.88)	4:13.79	
	2	2	Malta	Edward Caruana Dingli; Andrea Agius; Julian Harding; Andrew Chetcuti	DNS	
	2	8	Venezuela		DNS	
	3	1	Ghana		DNS	

=== Final ===
The final was held at 21:16.

Rank	Lane	Nation	Swimmers	Time	Notes
1st place, gold medalist(s)	4	United States	Matt Grevers (50.00); Kevin Cordes (57.15); Tom Shields (48.66); Ryan Lochte (45.22)	3:21.03	
2nd place, silver medalist(s)	5	Russia	Stanislav Donets (50.10); Viatcheslav Sinkevich (57.54); Nikolay Skvortsov (50.27); Vladimir Morozov (44.95)	3:22.86	
3rd place, bronze medalist(s)	3	Australia	Robert Hurley (50.44); Kenneth To (57.44); Grant Irvine (50.75); Tommaso D'Orsogna (46.14)	3:24.77	
4	6	Brazil	Guilherme Guido (50.67); Felipe Lima (58.05); Kaio de Almeida (49.86); Guilherme Roth (47.15)	3:25.73	
5	1	China	Cheng Feiyi (51.50); Li Xiayan (58.34); Wu Peng (50.31); Lü Zhiwu (47.29)	3:27.44	NR
6	8	Japan	Kosuke Hagino (51.37); Akihiro Yamaguchi (57.53); Kazuya Kaneda (51.20); Kenji Kobase (47.38)	3:27.48	
	2	Hungary	Péter Bernek (52.27); Dániel Gyurta; Bence Pulai; Dominik Kozma	DSQ	
	7	Italy	Mirco Di Tora (52.36); Mattia Pesce (58.14); Matteo Rivolta (51.60); Marco Orsi	DSQ	
