= Swimming at the 2012 Summer Olympics – Men's 100 metre backstroke =

Men's 100 metre backstroke at the Games of the XXX Olympiad
- Venue: London Aquatics Centre
- Date: July 29, 2012 (heats & semifinals); July 30, 2012 (final)
- Competitors: 43 from 33 nations
- Winning time: 52.16 OR

Medalists
1st place, gold medalist(s)		Matt Grevers	United States
2nd place, silver medalist(s)		Nick Thoman	United States
3rd place, bronze medalist(s)		Ryosuke Irie	Japan

The men's 100 metre backstroke event at the 2012 Summer Olympics took place on 29–30 July at the London Aquatics Centre in London, United Kingdom.

On the wake of Aaron Peirsol's official retirement in 2011, U.S. swimmer Matt Grevers continued to build an American supremacy in the event by following the former champion's footsteps towards his first individual gold. He held off a challenge from France's Camille Lacourt down the final stretch to touch the wall first in a sterling time of 52.16, eclipsing Peirsol's 2008 Olympic record by 0.38 seconds. Grevers also enjoyed his teammate Nick Thoman taking home the silver in 52.92, as the Americans climbed again on top of the podium for an eleventh time in the event's Olympic history and for a second straight 1–2 finish since 2008. Moving from behind at the final turn, Japan's Ryosuke Irie came up with a stalwart swim to capture the bronze in 52.97.

Leading the race early on the initial length, Lacourt dropped off the podium to a fourth-place time in 53.08. Great Britain's Liam Tancock (53.35), Germany's Helge Meeuw (53.48), Australia's defending bronze medalist Hayden Stoeckel (53.55), and China's Cheng Feiyi (53.77) also vied for an Olympic medal to round out the finale.

Other notable swimmers featured Russian duo Arkady Vyatchanin, reigning Olympic bronze medalist, who missed the final roster with a ninth-place effort (53.79); and Vladimir Morozov, who later scratched the semifinals to focus on his 4 × 100 m freestyle relay duty, allowing Greece's three-time Olympian Aristeidis Grigoriadis to occupy his slot.

== Records ==
Prior to this competition, the existing world and Olympic records were as follows.

World record	Aaron Peirsol (USA)	51.94	Indianapolis, United States	8 July 2009
Olympic record	Aaron Peirsol (USA)	52.54	Beijing, China	12 August 2008

The following records were established during the competition:

Date	Event	Name	Nationality	Time	Record
30 July	Final	Matt Grevers	United States	52.16	OR

== Results ==
=== Heats ===
Rank	Heat	Lane	Name	Nationality	Time	Notes
1	6	4	Matt Grevers	United States	52.92	Q
2	6	2	Cheng Feiyi	China	53.22	Q, NR
3	4	4	Nick Thoman	United States	53.48	Q
4	5	4	Camille Lacourt	France	53.51	Q
5	6	5	Ryosuke Irie	Japan	53.56	Q
6	6	7	Nick Driebergen	Netherlands	53.62	Q, NR
7	4	5	Helge Meeuw	Germany	53.83	Q
8	5	5	Liam Tancock	Great Britain	53.86	Q
9	6	6	Hayden Stoeckel	Australia	53.88	Q
10	4	2	Vladimir Morozov	Russia	54.01	Q, WD
10	5	2	Arkady Vyatchanin	Russia	54.01	Q
12	5	3	Jan-Philip Glania	Germany	54.07	Q
13	5	8	Charles Francis	Canada	54.08	Q
14	6	3	Gareth Kean	New Zealand	54.26	Q
15	6	1	Daniel Arnamnart	Australia	54.28	Q
16	4	3	Aschwin Wildeboer	Spain	54.36	Q
17	5	6	Aristeidis Grigoriadis	Greece	54.52	Q
18	3	1	Pavel Sankovich	Belarus	54.53	NR
19	3	5	Mirco di Tora	Italy	54.70	
20	3	7	Chris Walker-Hebborn	Great Britain	54.78	
21	3	4	He Jianbin	China	54.81	
22	3	3	Richárd Bohus	Hungary	54.84	
23	4	6	Bastiaan Lijesen	Netherlands	54.88	
24	4	1	Yakov-Yan Toumarkin	Israel	54.91	
25	4	7	Juan Miguel Rando Galvez	Spain	54.93	
26	3	8	Lavrans Solli	Norway	55.00	
27	5	1	Marcin Tarczyński	Poland	55.06	
28	4	8	Daniel Orzechowski	Brazil	55.16	
29	2	8	George Bovell	Trinidad and Tobago	55.22	NR
30	3	2	Mathias Gydesen	Denmark	55.31	
31	5	7	Benjamin Stasiulis	France	55.36	
32	2	5	Omar Pinzón	Colombia	55.37	
33	6	8	Charl Crous	South Africa	55.37	
34	2	1	Pedro Medel	Cuba	55.40	NR
35	2	2	Oleksandr Isakov	Ukraine	55.43	
36	2	7	Park Seon-kwan	South Korea	55.51	
37	3	6	Daniel Bell	New Zealand	55.53	
38	2	4	Alexandr Tarabrin	Kazakhstan	55.55	
39	2	6	I Gede Siman Sudartawa	Indonesia	55.99	
40	1	4	Bradley Ally	Barbados	56.27	
41	2	3	Federico Grabich	Argentina	56.56	
42	1	5	Heshan Unamboowe	Sri Lanka	57.94	
43	1	3	Zane Jordan	Zambia	58.77	

=== Semifinals ===
==== Semifinal 1 ====
Rank	Lane	Name	Nationality	Time	Notes
1	5	Camille Lacourt	France	53.03	Q
2	6	Liam Tancock	Great Britain	53.25	Q
3	4	Cheng Feiyi	China	53.50	Q
4	2	Arkady Vyatchanin	Russia	53.79	
5	3	Nick Driebergen	Netherlands	53.81	
6	8	Aristeidis Grigoriadis	Greece	54.20	
7	7	Charles Francis	Canada	54.42	
8	1	Daniel Arnamnart	Australia	54.48	

==== Semifinal 2 ====
Rank	Lane	Name	Nationality	Time	Notes
1	4	Matt Grevers	United States	52.66	Q
2	3	Ryosuke Irie	Japan	53.29	Q
3	5	Nick Thoman	United States	53.47	Q
4	6	Helge Meeuw	Germany	53.52	Q
5	2	Hayden Stoeckel	Australia	53.72	Q
6	7	Jan-Philip Glania	Germany	53.90	
7	8	Aschwin Wildeboer	Spain	53.99	
8	1	Gareth Kean	New Zealand	54.00	

=== Final ===
Rank	Lane	Name	Nationality	Time	Notes
1st place, gold medalist(s)	4	Matt Grevers	United States	52.16	OR
2nd place, silver medalist(s)	2	Nick Thoman	United States	52.92	
3rd place, bronze medalist(s)	6	Ryosuke Irie	Japan	52.97	
4	5	Camille Lacourt	France	53.08	
5	3	Liam Tancock	Great Britain	53.35	
6	1	Helge Meeuw	Germany	53.48	
7	8	Hayden Stoeckel	Australia	53.55	
8	7	Cheng Feiyi	China	53.77	
