= 100 metres backstroke =

The 100 metres backstroke is an event in competitive swimming. World records are ratified by World Aquatics (formerly FINA). The current long course world record holders are Italy's Thomas Ceccon and the US' Regan Smith, while the current short course world record holders are Hungary's Hubert Kós, and Smith.

The men's event was first contested at the Olympic Games in 1908; it was removed from the 1964 program and was reinstated at the 1968 games. The women's event has been contested since 1924. The current Olympic champions are Ceccon, and Australia's Kaylee McKeown. The men's and women's events have been contested at the World Aquatics Championships since the inaugural edition in 1973; the current world champions (long course) are South Africa's Pieter Coetze, and McKeown. The men's and women's events have been contested at the World Aquatics Swimming Championships (25m) since the inaugural edition in 1993; the current world champions (short course) are Miron Lifintsev and Smith.

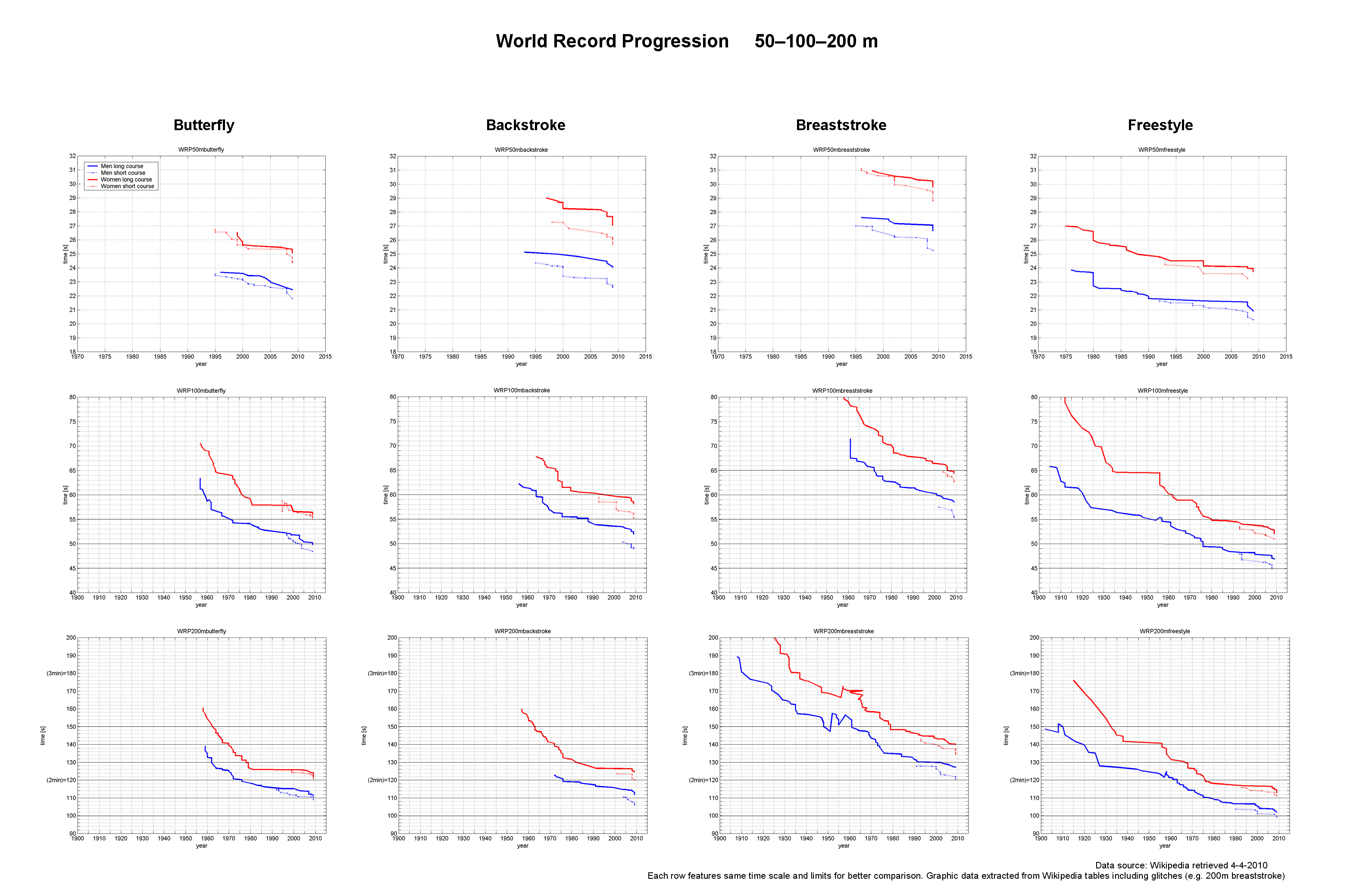
Graphic data for World Record Progression in Men and Women Swimming 50m-100m-200m Long and Short Course Butterfly-Backstroke-Breaststroke-Freestyle

== World record progression ==
=== Men long course ===
#	Time		Name	Nationality	Date	Meet	Location	Ref
1	1:02.2		David Theile	Australia	6 December 1956	Olympic Games	Melbourne, Australia	
2	1:01.5		John Monckton	Australia	15 February 1958	Australian Championships	Perth, Australia	
3	1:01.3		Bob Bennett	United States	19 August 1961	Men’s NAAA Championships	Los Angeles, United States	
4	1:01.0	h	Tom Stock	United States	11 August 1962	-	Cuyahoga Falls, United States	
5	1:00.9		Tom Stock	United States	12 August 1962	-	Cuyahoga Falls, United States	
6	1:00.8		Ernst-Joachim Küppers	West Germany	28 August 1964	-	Dortmund, West Germany	
7	1:00.0		Thompson Mann	United States	3 September 1964	-	New York City, United States	
8	59.6	r	Thompson Mann	United States	16 October 1964	Olympic Games	Tokyo, Japan	
9	59.5	h	Doug Russell	United States	28 August 1967	Summer Universiade	Tokyo, Japan	
10	59.3		Charlie Hickcox	United States	28 August 1967	Summer Universiade	Tokyo, Japan	
11	59.1		Charlie Hickcox	United States	31 August 1967	Summer Universiade	Tokyo, Japan	
12	58.4		Roland Matthes	East Germany	21 September 1967	-	Leipzig, East Germany	
13	58.0		Roland Matthes	East Germany	26 October 1968	Olympic Games	Mexico City, Mexico	
14	57.8		Roland Matthes	East Germany	23 August 1969	-	Würzburg, West Germany	
15	56.9	h	Roland Matthes	East Germany	8 September 1970	European Championships	Barcelona, Spain	
16	56.7		Roland Matthes	East Germany	4 September 1971	-	Leipzig, East Germany	
17	56.3		Roland Matthes	East Germany	8 April 1972	-	Moscow, Soviet Union	
17	56.30	=, r	Roland Matthes	East Germany	4 September 1972	Olympic Games	Munich, West Germany	
19	56.19	sf	John Naber	United States	18 July 1976	Olympic Games	Montreal, Canada	
20	55.49		John Naber	United States	19 July 1976	Olympic Games	Montreal, Canada	
21	55.44	h	Rick Carey	United States	6 August 1983	US National Championships	Clovis, United States	
22	55.38		Rick Carey	United States	6 August 1983	US National Championships	Clovis, United States	
23	55.19		Rick Carey	United States	21 August 1983	Pan American Games	Caracas, Venezuela	
24	55.17	h	Igor Polyansky	Soviet Union	15 March 1988	-	Tallinn, Soviet Union	
25	55.16		Igor Polyansky	Soviet Union	16 March 1988	-	Tallinn, Soviet Union	
26	55.00		Igor Polyansky	Soviet Union	16 July 1988	Soviet Union Championships	Moscow, Soviet Union	
27	54.95	h	David Berkoff	United States	12 August 1988	US Olympic Trials	Austin, United States	
28	54.91		David Berkoff	United States	12 August 1988	US Olympic Trials	Austin, United States	
29	54.51	h	David Berkoff	United States	16 September 1988	Olympic Games	Seoul, South Korea	
30	53.93	r	Jeff Rouse	United States	25 August 1991	Pan Pacific Championships	Edmonton, Canada	
31	53.86	r	Jeff Rouse	United States	31 July 1992	Olympic Games	Barcelona, Spain	
32	53.60		Lenny Krayzelburg	United States	24 August 1999	Pan Pacific Championships	Sydney, Australia	
33	53.45	r	Aaron Peirsol	United States	21 August 2004	Olympic Games	Athens, Greece	
34	53.17		Aaron Peirsol	United States	2 April 2005	US World Championships Trials	Indianapolis, United States	
35	52.98		Aaron Peirsol	United States	27 March 2007	World Championships	Melbourne, Australia	
36	52.89		Aaron Peirsol	United States	1 July 2008	US Olympic Trials	Omaha, United States	
37	52.54		Aaron Peirsol	United States	12 August 2008	Olympic Games	Beijing, China	
38	52.38	r	Aschwin Wildeboer	Spain	1 July 2009	Mediterranean Games	Pescara, Italy	
39	51.94		Aaron Peirsol	United States	8 July 2009	US National Championships	Indianapolis, United States	
40	51.85	r	Ryan Murphy	United States	13 August 2016	Olympic Games	Rio de Janeiro, Brazil	
41	51.60		Thomas Ceccon	Italy	20 June 2022	World Championships	Budapest, Hungary	

Legend: # – Record awaiting ratification by World Aquatics; e – equalled existing record;
Records not set in finals: h – heat; sf – semifinal; r – relay 1st leg; rh – relay heat 1st leg; b – B final; † – en route to final mark; so – swim-off; tt – time trial

=== Men short course ===
#	Time		Name	Nationality	Date	Meet	Location	Ref
1	52.71		Mark Tewksbury	Canada	16 March 1991	World Cup	Bonn, Germany	
2	52.58		Mark Tewksbury	Canada	29 March 1991	World Cup	Sheffield, United Kingdom	
3	52.52		Mark Tewksbury	Canada	20 February 1992	-	Winnipeg, Canada	
4	52.50	r	Mark Tewksbury	Canada	22 February 1992	-	Winnipeg, Canada	
5	51.43		Jeff Rouse	United States	12 April 1993	World Cup	Sheffield, United Kingdom	
6	51.28		Lenny Krayzelburg	United States	5 February 2000	World Cup	Berlin, Germany	
7	50.75		Neil Walker	United States	19 March 2000	World Cup	Athens, Greece	
8	50.58		Thomas Rupprath	Germany	8 December 2002	World Cup	Melbourne, Australia	
9	50.32		Peter Marshall	United States	26 March 2004	NCAA Division I Championships	New York City, United States	
10	49.99	r	Ryan Lochte	United States	9 April 2006	World Championships	Shanghai, China	
11	49.94		Peter Marshall	United States	11 November 2008	World Cup	Stockholm, Sweden	
12	49.63		Peter Marshall	United States	15 November 2008	World Cup	Berlin, Germany	
13	49.32		Stanislav Donets	Russia	14 December 2008	European Championships	Rijeka, Croatia	
14	49.20	r	Aschwin Wildeboer	Spain	21 December 2008	Spanish Championships	Madrid, Spain	
15	49.17	sf	Arkady Vyatchanin	Russia	12 December 2009	European Championships	Istanbul, Turkey	
16	48.97	=	Arkady Vyatchanin	Russia	13 December 2009	European Championships	Istanbul, Turkey	
16	48.97	=	Stanislav Donets	Russia	13 December 2009	European Championships	Istanbul, Turkey	
18	48.94	r	Nick Thoman	United States	18 December 2009	Duel in the Pool	Manchester, United Kingdom	
19	48.92		Matt Grevers	United States	12 December 2015	Duel in the Pool	Indianapolis, United States	
20	48.90		Kliment Kolesnikov	Russia	22 December 2017	Vladimir Salnikov Cup	Saint Petersburg, Russia	
21	48.88		Xu Jiayu	China	11 November 2018	World Cup	Tokyo, Japan	
22	48.58	r	Kliment Kolesnikov	Russia	21 November 2020	International Swimming League	Budapest, Hungary	
23	48.33		Coleman Stewart	United States	29 August 2021	International Swimming League	Naples, Italy	
24	48.16		Hubert Kós	Hungary	25 October 2025	World Cup	Toronto, Canada	

Legend: # – Record awaiting ratification by World Aquatics; e – equalled existing record;
Records not set in finals: h – heat; sf – semifinal; r – relay 1st leg; rh – relay heat 1st leg; b – B final; † – en route to final mark; so – swim-off; tt – time trial

=== Women long course ===
#	Time		Name	Nationality	Date	Meet	Location	Ref
1	1:07.7		Cathy Ferguson	United States	14 October 1964	Olympic Games	Tokyo, Japan	
2	1:07.4		Ann Farlie	South Africa	23 July 1966	-	Béziers, France	
3	1:07.3	h	Elaine Tanner	Canada	27 July 1967	Pan American Games	Winnipeg, Canada	
4	1:07.1		Elaine Tanner	Canada	30 July 1967	Pan American Games	Winnipeg, Canada	
5	1:06.7		Karen Muir	South Africa	30 January 1968	-	Kimberley, South Africa	
6	1:06.4		Karen Muir	South Africa	6 April 1968	-	Paris, France	
7	1:06.2		Kaye Hall	United States	22 October 1968	Olympic Games	Mexico City, Mexico	
8	1:05.6		Karen Muir	South Africa	6 July 1969	-	Utrecht, Netherlands	
9	1:05.39		Ulrike Richter	East Germany	18 August 1973	-	Utrecht, Netherlands	
10	1:04.99	r	Ulrike Richter	East Germany	4 September 1973	World Championships	Belgrade, Yugoslavia	
11	1:04.78	r	Wendy Cook	Canada	31 January 1974	Commonwealth Games	Christchurch, New Zealand	
12	1:04.43		Ulrike Richter	East Germany	8 July 1974	-	Rostock, East Germany	
13	1:04.09	h	Ulrike Richter	East Germany	22 August 1974	European Championships	Vienna, Austria	
14	1:03.30		Ulrike Richter	East Germany	23 August 1974	European Championships	Vienna, Austria	
15	1:02.98		Ulrike Richter	East Germany	1 September 1974	USA Vs. GDR Dual Meet	Concord, United States	
16	1:02.60		Ulrike Richter	East Germany	14 March 1976	-	Tallinn, Soviet Union	
17	1:01.62		Kornelia Ender	East Germany	3 June 1976	-	East Berlin, East Germany	
18	1:01.51	r	Ulrike Richter	East Germany	5 June 1976	-	East Berlin, East Germany	
18	1:01.51	r, =	Rica Reinisch	East Germany	20 July 1980	Olympic Games	Moscow, Soviet Union	
20	1:01.50	h	Rica Reinisch	East Germany	22 July 1980	Olympic Games	Moscow, Soviet Union	
21	1:00.86		Rica Reinisch	East Germany	23 July 1980	Olympic Games	Moscow, Soviet Union	
22	1:00.59	r	Ina Kleber	East Germany	24 August 1984	Friendship Games	Moscow, Soviet Union	
23	1:00.31		Krisztina Egerszegi	Hungary	24 August 1991	European Championships	Athens, Greece	
24	1:00.16	r	He Cihong	China	10 September 1994	World Championships	Rome, Italy	
25	59.58		Natalie Coughlin	United States	13 August 2002	US National Championships	Fort Lauderdale, United States	
26	59.44		Natalie Coughlin	United States	27 March 2007	World Championships	Melbourne, Australia	
27	59.21		Natalie Coughlin	United States	17 February 2008	US Grand Prix	Columbia, United States	
28	59.15	h	Hayley McGregory	United States	30 June 2008	US Olympic Trials	Omaha, United States	
29	59.03	h	Natalie Coughlin	United States	30 June 2008	US Olympic Trials	Omaha, United States	
30	58.97		Natalie Coughlin	United States	1 July 2008	US Olympic Trials	Omaha, United States	
31	58.77	sf	Kirsty Coventry	Zimbabwe	11 August 2008	Olympic Games	Beijing, China	
32	58.48	sf	Anastasia Zuyeva	Russia	27 July 2009	World Championships	Rome, Italy	
33	58.12		Gemma Spofforth	Great Britain	28 July 2009	World Championships	Rome, Italy	
34	58.10		Kylie Masse	Canada	25 July 2017	World Championships	Budapest, Hungary	
35	58.00		Kathleen Baker	United States	28 July 2018	US National Championships	Irvine, United States	
36	57.57	r	Regan Smith	United States	28 July 2019	World Championships	Gwangju, South Korea	
37	57.45		Kaylee McKeown	Australia	13 June 2021	Australian Trials	Adelaide, Australia	
38	57.33		Kaylee McKeown	Australia	21 October 2023	World Cup	Budapest, Hungary	
39	57.13		Regan Smith	United States	18 June 2024	US Olympic Trials	Indianapolis, United States	

Legend: # – Record awaiting ratification by World Aquatics; e – equalled existing record;
Records not set in finals: h – heat; sf – semifinal; r – relay 1st leg; rh – relay heat 1st leg; b – B final; † – en route to final mark; so – swim-off; tt – time trial

=== Women short course ===
#	Time		Name	Nationality	Date	Meet	Location	Ref
1	59.41		Angel Martino	United States	21 November 1993	-	Stavanger, Norway	
2	58.50		Angel Martino	United States	3 December 1993	World Championships	Palma de Mallorca, Spain	
3	58.45		Reiko Nakamura	Japan	4 March 2001	-	Sagamihara, Japan	
4	57.08		Natalie Coughlin	United States	29 November 2001	World Cup	East Meadow, United States	
5	56.71		Natalie Coughlin	United States	23 November 2002	World Cup	East Meadow, United States	
6	56.51		Natalie Coughlin	United States	28 October 2007	World Cup	Singapore	
7	56.15		Shiho Sakai	Japan	22 February 2009	Japan Open	Tokyo, Japan	
8	55.23		Shiho Sakai	Japan	15 November 2009	World Cup	Berlin, Germany	
9	55.03		Katinka Hosszú	Hungary	4 December 2014	World Championships	Doha, Qatar	
10	54.89		Minna Atherton	Australia	27 October 2019	International Swimming League	Budapest, Hungary	
11	54.56		Kaylee McKeown	Australia	26 September 2024	Australian Championships	Adelaide, Australia	
12	54.41		Regan Smith	United States	25 October 2024	World Cup	Incheon, South Korea	
13	54.27		Regan Smith	United States	1 November 2024	World Cup	Singapore	
14	54.02	r	Regan Smith	United States	15 December 2024	World Championships	Budapest, Hungary	
14	54.02	e	Regan Smith	United States	18 October 2025	World Cup	Westmont, United States	
16	53.92	#	Claire Curzan	United States	30 October 2026	US Short Course World Championship Trials	Westmont, United States	

Legend: # – Record awaiting ratification by World Aquatics; e – equalled existing record;
Records not set in finals: h – heat; sf – semifinal; r – relay 1st leg; rh – relay heat 1st leg; b – B final; † – en route to final mark; so – swim-off; tt – time trial

== All-time top 25 ==
Tables show data for two definitions of "Top 25" - the top 25 100 m backstroke times and the top 25 athletes:
- denotes top performance for athletes in the top 25 100 m backstroke times
- denotes lesser performances, still in the top 25 100 m backstroke times, by repeat athletes
- denotes top performance (only) for other top 25 athletes who fall outside the top 25 100 m backstroke times

=== Men long course ===
- Correct as of September 2026

Ath.#	Perf.#	Time	Athlete	Nation	Date	Place	Ref.
1	1	51.60	Thomas Ceccon	Italy	20 June 2022	Budapest	
2	2	51.71	Pieter Coetze	South Africa	29 July 2026	Glasgow	
	3	51.77	Coetze #2		29 July 2026	Glasgow	
	4	51.80	Ceccon #2		3 August 2025	Singapore	
3	5	51.82	Kliment Kolesnikov	Russia	26 July 2023	Kazan	
4	6	51.85	Ryan Murphy	United States	13 August 2016	Rio de Janeiro	
	6	51.85	Coetze #3		29 July 2025	Singapore	
5	8	51.86	Xu Jiayu	China	12 April 2017	Qingdao	
	9	51.90	Ceccon #3		29 July 2025	Singapore	
6	10	51.92	Yohann Ndoye Brouard	France	29 July 2025	Singapore	
	11	51.93	Ceccon #4		25 June 2022	Budapest	
7	12	51.94	Aaron Peirsol	United States	8 July 2009	Indianapolis	
	12	51.94	Murphy #2		10 August 2018	Tokyo	
	14	51.97	Murphy #3		8 August 2016	Rio de Janeiro	
	14	51.97	Murphy #4		20 June 2022	Budapest	
8	16	51.98	Evgeny Rylov	Russia	27 July 2021	Tokyo	
8	16	51.98	Hunter Armstrong	United States	20 June 2022	Budapest	
	16	51.98	Coetze #4		28 July 2026	Glasgow	
	16	51.98	Xu #2		20 September 2026	Tokyo	
	20	51.99	Coetze #5		19 July 2025	Berlin	
	21	52.00	Kolesnikov #2		27 July 2021	Tokyo	
	21	52.00	Ceccon #5		29 July 2024	Paris	
	23	52.02	Xu #3		28 July 2024	Paris	
	24	52.04	Murphy #5		30 July 2023	Fukuoka	
	24	52.04	Kolesnikov #3		14 April 2025	Kazan	
10		52.08	Matt Grevers	United States	25 June 2012	Omaha	
10		52.08	Miron Lifintsev	Russia	28 July 2024	Yekaterinburg	
12		52.09	Apostolos Christou	Greece	19 June 2022	Budapest	
13		52.11	Camille Lacourt	France	10 August 2010	Budapest	
13		52.11	Mitch Larkin	Australia	6 November 2015	Dubai	
15		52.12	David Plummer	United States	27 June 2016	Omaha	
15		52.12	Oliver Morgan	Great Britain	17 April 2025	London	
17		52.20	Hubert Kós	Hungary	29 July 2025	Singapore	
18		52.24	Ryosuke Irie	Japan	4 September 2009	Kumamoto	
19		52.26	Junya Koga	Japan	28 July 2009	Rome	
20		52.27	Helge Meeuw	Germany	2 August 2009	Rome	
21		52.38	Aschwin Wildeboer	Spain	1 July 2009	Pescara	
22		52.40	Pavel Samusenko	Russia	14 April 2025	Kazan	
23		52.51	Nick Thoman	United States	7 August 2009	Federal Way	
23		52.51	Shaine Casas	United States	8 July 2022	Austin	
25		52.54	Will Modglin	United States	19 July 2025	Berlin	

=== Men short course ===
- Correct as of October 2026

Ath.#	Perf.#	Time	Athlete	Nation	Date	Place	Ref.
1	1	48.16	Hubert Kós	Hungary	25 October 2025	Toronto	
2	2	48.21	Pieter Coetze	South Africa	10 October 2026	Tashkent	
3	3	48.33	Coleman Stewart	United States	29 August 2021	Naples	
	4	48.40	Coetze #2		15 October 2026	Astana	
4	5	48.50	Ryan Murphy	United States	14 December 2022	Melbourne	
5	6	48.54	Xu Jiayu	China	27 October 2026	Beijing	
6	7	48.58	Kliment Kolesnikov	Russia	21 November 2020	Budapest	
	8	48.59	Kolesnikov #2		12 November 2025	Kazan	
7	9	48.61	Pavel Samusenko	Russia	8 November 2026	Saint Petersburg	
	10	48.63	Kolesnikov #3		14 December 2020	Saint Petersburg	
	10	48.63	Kolesnikov #4		18 December 2023	Saint Petersburg	
	12	48.71	Kolesnikov #5		15 December 2020	Saint Petersburg	
8	13	48.76	Miron Lifintsev	Russia	11 December 2024	Budapest	
	14	48.77	Xu #2		24 October 2026	Beijing	
	15	48.78	Kós #2		19 October 2025	Westmont	
	15	48.78	Samusenko #2		19 December 2025	Saint Petersburg	
	17	48.79	Kós #3		11 December 2024	Budapest	
	18	48.82	Kolesnikov #6		22 November 2020	Budapest	
	18	48.82	Kolesnikov #7		21 November 2022	Kazan	
9	20	48.84	Shaine Casas	United States	30 October 2022	Toronto	
	21	48.88	Xu #3		11 November 2018	Tokyo	
10	21	48.88	Evgeny Rylov	Russia	15 December 2020	Saint Petersburg	
	23	48.90	Kolesnikov #8		22 December 2017	Saint Petersburg	
	24	48.91	Stewart #2		28 August 2021	Naples	
11	25	48.92	Matt Grevers	United States	12 December 2015	Indianapolis	
	25	48.92	Casas #2		15 December 2024	Budapest	
12		48.94	Nick Thoman	United States	18 December 2009	Manchester	
13		48.95	Stanislav Donets	Russia	19 December 2010	Dubai	
13		48.95	Guilherme Guido	Brazil	3 September 2021	Naples	
15		48.97	Arkady Vyatchanin	Russia	13 December 2009	Istanbul	
16		49.03	Mitch Larkin	Australia	28 November 2015	Sydney	
17		49.04	Lorenzo Mora	Italy	14 December 2022	Melbourne	
18		49.05	Aschwin Wildeboer	Spain	13 December 2009	Istanbul	
19		49.10	Kacper Stokowski	Poland	15 December 2024	Budapest	
20		49.23	Radosław Kawęcki	Poland	20 December 2015	Lublin	
21		49.25	Mark Nikolaev	Russia	12 November 2021	Eindhoven	
22		49.29	Peter Marshall	United States	10 November 2009	Stockholm	
22		49.29	Thomas Ceccon	Italy	5 December 2025	Lublin	
24		49.31	Robert Glință	Romania	5 November 2021	Kazan	
25		49.39	Blake Tierney	Canada	11 December 2024	Budapest	

=== Women long course ===
- Correct as of August 2026

Ath.#	Perf.#	Time	Athlete	Nation	Date	Place	Ref.
1	1	57.13	Regan Smith	United States	18 June 2024	Indianapolis	
2	2	57.16	Kaylee McKeown	Australia	29 July 2025	Singapore	
	3	57.28	Smith #2		4 August 2024	Paris	
	4	57.33	McKeown #2		21 October 2023	Budapest	
	4	57.33	McKeown #3		30 July 2024	Paris	
	6	57.35	Smith #3		29 July 2025	Singapore	
	7	57.41	McKeown #4		11 June 2024	Brisbane	
	8	57.45	McKeown #5		13 June 2021	Adelaide	
	9	57.46	Smith #4		3 May 2025	Fort Lauderdale	
	10	57.47	McKeown #6		27 July 2021	Tokyo	
	10	57.47	Smith #5		17 June 2024	Indianapolis	
	12	57.49	Smith #6		2 May 2026	Fort Lauderdale	
	13	57.50	McKeown #7		14 June 2023	Melbourne	
	14	57.51	Smith #7		26 May 2024	Irvine	
	15	57.53	McKeown #8		25 July 2023	Fukuoka	
3	16	57.55	Isabelle Stadden	United States	2 May 2026	Fort Lauderdale	
	17	57.57	Smith #8		28 July 2019	Gwangju	
	17	57.57	McKeown #9		16 March 2024	Sydney	
	17	57.57	Smith #9		3 August 2025	Singapore	
	20	57.63	McKeown #10		15 May 2021	Sydney	
	20	57.63	McKeown #11		14 October 2023	Athens	
	22	57.64	Smith #10		8 March 2024	Westmont	
	23	57.65	Smith #11		19 June 2022	Budapest	
	23	57.65	McKeown #12		22 April 2025	Gold Coast	
	25	57.66	Smith #12		30 July 2024	Paris	
4		57.70	Kylie Masse	Canada	19 June 2021	Toronto	
5		57.83	Katharine Berkoff	United States	17 June 2024	Indianapolis	
6		57.88	Mollie O'Callaghan	Australia	11 June 2024	Brisbane	
7		57.94	Mary-Ambre Moluh	France	15 August 2026	Paris	
8		58.00	Kathleen Baker	United States	28 July 2018	Irvine	
9		58.08	Kathleen Dawson	Great Britain	23 May 2021	Budapest	
10		58.12	Gemma Spofforth	Great Britain	28 July 2009	Rome	
11		58.18	Anastasia Fesikova	Russia	28 July 2009	Rome	
12		58.21	Claire Curzan	United States	12 August 2026	Irvine	
13		58.23	Emily Seebohm	Australia	29 July 2012	London	
14		58.31	Olivia Smoliga	United States	15 May 2021	Atlanta	
15		58.33	Missy Franklin	United States	30 July 2012	London	
15		58.33	Marrit Steenbergen	Netherlands	2 July 2026	Eindhoven	
17		58.37	Taylor Ruck	Canada	5 July 2026	Montreal	
18		58.43	Rhyan White	United States	15 May 2021	Atlanta	
18		58.43	Rhyan White	United States	27 July 2021	Tokyo	
18		58.43	Iona Anderson	Australia	11 June 2024	Brisbane	
18		58.43	Sara Curtis	Italy	16 August 2026	Paris	
21		58.45	Katinka Hosszú	Hungary	8 August 2016	Rio de Janeiro	
22		58.53	Leah Shackley	United States	17 May 2025	Charlotte	
23		58.55	Kennedy Noble	United States	17 June 2024	Indianapolis	
24		58.60	Minna Atherton	Australia	22 July 2019	Gwangju	
25		58.63	Phoebe Bacon	United States	6 December 2019	Atlanta	

=== Women short course ===
- Correct as of October 2026

Ath.#	Perf.#	Time	Athlete	Nation	Date	Place	Ref.
1	1	53.92	Claire Curzan	United States	30 October 2026	Westmont	
2	2	54.02	Regan Smith	United States	15 December 2024	Budapest	
2	2	54.02	Regan Smith	United States	18 October 2025	Westmont	
	4	54.27	Smith #3		1 November 2024	Singapore	
	5	54.41	Smith #4		25 October 2024	Incheon	
3	6	54.49	Kaylee McKeown	Australia	24 October 2025	Toronto	
	7	54.55	Smith #5		11 December 2024	Budapest	
	8	54.56	McKeown #2		26 September 2024	Adelaide	
	9	54.57	Smith #6		24 October 2025	Toronto	
4	10	54.72	Katharine Berkoff	United States	30 October 2026	Westmont	
	11	54.75	Smith #7		30 October 2026	Westmont	
	12	54.82	Smith #8		30 October 2026	Westmont	
5	13	54.89	Minna Atherton	Australia	27 October 2019	Budapest	
5	13	54.89	Gretchen Walsh	United States	18 October 2024	Charlottesville	
	13	54.89	Smith #9		19 October 2024	Shanghai	
	16	54.92	Smith #10		11 October 2025	Carmel	
	17	54.93	Berkoff #2		11 December 2024	Budapest	
	18	54.94	Curzan #2		16 October 2026	Charlottesville	
	19	54.96	Smith #11		16 October 2026	Charlottesville	
7	20	55.03	Katinka Hosszú	Hungary	4 December 2014	Doha	
8	21	55.04	Olivia Smoliga	United States	22 November 2020	Budapest	
	21	55.04	McKeown #3		18 October 2025	Westmont	
	23	55.05	Smith #12		10 December 2024	Budapest	
	23	55.05	McKeown #4		11 October 2025	Carmel	
	25	55.07	Berkoff #3		16 October 2026	Charlottesville	
9		55.17	Kira Toussaint	Netherlands	4 December 2019	Glasgow	
9		55.17	Marrit Steenbergen	Netherlands	2 October 2026	Baku	
11		55.20	Louise Hansson	Sweden	17 December 2021	Abu Dhabi	
12		55.22	Kylie Masse	Canada	17 December 2021	Abu Dhabi	
13		55.23	Shiho Sakai	Japan	15 November 2009	Berlin	
14		55.25	Bella Sims	United States	11 October 2025	Carmel	
15		55.31	Emily Seebohm	Australia	4 December 2014	Doha	
16		55.36	Ingrid Wilm	Canada	18 December 2022	Melbourne	
17		55.48	Gao Chang	China	28 February 2010	Tokyo	
18		55.54	Daryna Zevina	Ukraine	4 December 2014	Doha	
19		55.57	Iona Anderson	Australia	29 September 2026	Sydney	
20		55.62	Mollie O'Callaghan	Australia	14 December 2022	Melbourne	
21		55.72	Beata Nelson	United States	1 November 2024	Singapore	
22		55.76	Aya Terakawa	Japan	23 February 2013	Sagamihara	
23		55.83	Maria Kameneva	Russia	18 December 2022	Saint Petersburg	
24		55.86	Maaike de Waard	Netherlands	6 November 2021	Kazan	
25		55.87	Rhyan White	United States	17 December 2021	Abu Dhabi	

== Olympic champions ==
=== Men ===
Edition	Winner	Time	Notes	Ref.
(United Kingdom) London 1908	Arno Bieberstein (GER)	1:24.6	WR	
(Sweden) Stockholm 1912	Harry Hebner (USA)	1:21.2	(Note: Harry Hebner set an Olympic record of 1:20.8 in the semifinals.)	
(Belgium) Antwerp 1920	Warren Kealoha (USA)	1:15.2	(Note: Warren Kealoha set a world record of 1:14.8 in the semifinals.)	
(France) Paris 1924	Warren Kealoha (USA)	1:13.2	OR	
(Netherlands) Amsterdam 1928	George Kojac (USA)	1:08.2	WR	
(United States) Los Angeles 1932	Masaji Kiyokawa (JPN)	1:08.6		
(Nazi Germany) Berlin 1936	Adolph Kiefer (USA)	1:05.9	OR	
(United Kingdom) London 1948	Allen Stack (USA)	1:06.4		
(Finland) Helsinki 1952	Yoshi Oyakawa (USA)	1:05.4	OR	
(Australia) Melbourne 1956	David Theile (AUS)	1:02.2	WR	
(Italy) Rome 1960	David Theile (AUS)	1:01.9	OR	
1964	not included in the program			
Mexico City 1968	Roland Matthes (GDR)	58.7	OR	
(West Germany) Munich 1972	Roland Matthes (GDR)	56.58	OR	
(Canada) Montreal 1976	John Naber (USA)	55.49	WR	
(Soviet Union) Moscow 1980	Bengt Baron (SWE)	56.53		
(United States) Los Angeles 1984	Rick Carey (USA)	55.79		
(South Korea) Seoul 1988	Daichi Suzuki (JPN)	55.05	(Note: David Berkoff set a world record of 54.51 in the heats.)	
(Spain) Barcelona 1992	Mark Tewksbury (CAN)	53.98	OR	
(United States) Atlanta 1996	Jeff Rouse (USA)	54.10		
(Australia) Sydney 2000	Lenny Krayzelburg (USA)	53.72	OR	
(Greece) Athens 2004	Aaron Peirsol (USA)	54.06		
(China) Beijing 2008	Aaron Peirsol (USA)	52.54	WR	
(United Kingdom) London 2012	Matt Grevers (USA)	52.16	OR	
(Brazil) Rio de Janeiro 2016	Ryan Murphy (USA)	51.97	OR	
(Japan) Tokyo 2020	Evgeny Rylov (ROC)	51.98		
(France) Paris 2024	Thomas Ceccon (ITA)	52.00		

=== Women ===
Edition	Winner	Time	Notes	Ref.
(France) Paris 1924	Sybil Bauer (USA)	1:23.2	OR	
(Netherlands) Amsterdam 1928	Marie Braun (NED)	1:22.0	(Note: Marie Braun set a world record of 1:21.6 in the heats.)	
(United States) Los Angeles 1932	Eleanor Holm (USA)	1:19.4	(Note: Eleanor Holm set a world record of 1:18.3 in the semifinals.)	
(Nazi Germany) Berlin 1936	Nida Senff (NED)	1:18.9	(Note: Nida Senff set an Olympic record of 1:16.6 in the semifinals.)	
(United Kingdom) London 1948	Karen Harup (DEN)	1:14.4	OR	
(Finland) Helsinki 1952	Joan Harrison (RSA)	1:14.3		
(Australia) Melbourne 1956	Judy Grinham (GBR)	1:12.9	WR	
(Italy) Rome 1960	Lynn Burke (USA)	1:09.3	OR	
(Japan) Tokyo 1964	Cathy Ferguson (USA)	1:07.7	WR	
Mexico City 1968	Kaye Hall (USA)	1:06.2	WR	
(West Germany) Munich 1972	Melissa Belote (USA)	1:05.78	OR	
(Canada) Montreal 1976	Ulrike Richter (GDR)	1:01.83	OR	
(Soviet Union) Moscow 1980	Rica Reinisch (GDR)	1:00.86	WR	
(United States) Los Angeles 1984	Theresa Andrews (USA)	1:02.55		
(South Korea) Seoul 1988	Kristin Otto (GDR)	1:00.89		
(Spain) Barcelona 1992	Krisztina Egerszegi (HUN)	1:00.68	OR	
(United States) Atlanta 1996	Beth Botsford (USA)	1:01.19		
(Australia) Sydney 2000	Diana Mocanu (ROU)	1:00.21	OR	
(Greece) Athens 2004	Natalie Coughlin (USA)	1:00.37	(Note: Natalie Coughlin set an Olympic record of 1:00.17 in the semifinals.)	
(China) Beijing 2008	Natalie Coughlin (USA)	58.96	(Note: Kirsty Coventry set a world record of 58.77 in the semifinals.)	
(United Kingdom) London 2012	Missy Franklin (USA)	58.33	(Note: Emily Seebohm set an Olympic record of 58.23 in the heats.)	
(Brazil) Rio de Janeiro 2016	Katinka Hosszú (HUN)	58.45		
(Japan) Tokyo 2020	Kaylee McKeown (AUS)	57.47	OR	
(France) Paris 2024	Kaylee McKeown (AUS)	57.33	OR	

== World champions (long course) ==
=== Men ===
Edition	Winner	Time	Notes	Ref.
(Socialist Federal Republic of Yugoslavia) Belgrade 1973	Roland Matthes (GDR)	57.47	CR	
(Colombia) Cali 1975	Roland Matthes (GDR)	58.15		
(West Germany) West Berlin 1978	Bob Jackson (USA)	56.36	CR	
(Ecuador) Guayaquil 1982	Dirk Richter (GDR)	55.95	CR	
(Spain) Madrid 1986	Igor Polyansky (URS)	55.58	CR	
(Australia) Perth 1991	Jeff Rouse (USA)	55.23	CR	
(Italy) Rome 1994	Martín López-Zubero (ESP)	55.17	CR	
(Australia) Perth 1998	Lenny Krayzelburg (USA)	55.00	CR	
(Japan) Fukuoka 2001	Matt Welsh (AUS)	54.31	CR	
(Spain) Barcelona 2003	Aaron Peirsol (USA)	53.61	CR	
(Canada) Montreal 2005	Aaron Peirsol (USA)	53.62		
(Australia) Melbourne 2007	Aaron Peirsol (USA)	52.98	WR	
(Italy) Rome 2009	Junya Koga (JPN)	52.26	CR	
(China) Shanghai 2011	Camille Lacourt (FRA)	52.76		
(China) Shanghai 2011	Jérémy Stravius (FRA)	52.76		
(Spain) Barcelona 2013	Matt Grevers (USA)	52.93		
(Russia) Kazan 2015	Mitch Larkin (AUS)	52.40		
(Hungary) Budapest 2017	Xu Jiayu (CHN)	52.44		
(South Korea) Gwangju 2019	Xu Jiayu (CHN)	52.43	(Note: Xu Jiayu set a championship record of 52.17 in the semifinals.)	
(Hungary) Budapest 2022	Thomas Ceccon (ITA)	51.60	WR	
(Japan) Fukuoka 2023	Ryan Murphy (USA)	52.22		
(Qatar) Doha 2024	Hunter Armstrong (USA)	52.68		
Singapore 2025	Pieter Coetze (RSA)	51.85		

=== Women ===
Edition	Winner	Time	Notes	Ref.
(Socialist Federal Republic of Yugoslavia) Belgrade 1973	Ulrike Richter (GDR)	1:05.42	CR	
(Colombia) Cali 1975	Ulrike Richter (GDR)	1:03.30	CR	
(West Germany) West Berlin 1978	Linda Jezek (USA)	1:02.55	CR	
(Ecuador) Guayaquil 1982	Kristin Otto (GDR)	1:01.30	CR	
(Spain) Madrid 1986	Betsy Mitchell (USA)	1:01.74		
(Australia) Perth 1991	Krisztina Egerszegi (HUN)	1:01.78		
(Italy) Rome 1994	He Cihong (CHN)	1:00.57	CR	
(Australia) Perth 1998	Lea Loveless (USA)	1:01.16		
(Japan) Fukuoka 2001	Natalie Coughlin (USA)	1:00.37		
(Spain) Barcelona 2003	Antje Buschschulte (GER)	1:00.50		
(Canada) Montreal 2005	Kirsty Coventry (ZIM)	1:00.24		
(Australia) Melbourne 2007	Natalie Coughlin (USA)	59.44	WR	
(Italy) Rome 2009	Gemma Spofforth (GBR)	58.12	WR	
(China) Shanghai 2011	Zhao Jing (CHN)	59.05		
(Spain) Barcelona 2013	Missy Franklin (USA)	58.42		
(Russia) Kazan 2015	Emily Seebohm (AUS)	58.26		
(Hungary) Budapest 2017	Kylie Masse (CAN)	58.10	WR	
(South Korea) Gwangju 2019	Kylie Masse (CAN)	58.60		
(Hungary) Budapest 2022	Regan Smith (USA)	58.22		
(Japan) Fukuoka 2023	Kaylee McKeown (AUS)	57.53	CR	
(Qatar) Doha 2024	Claire Curzan (USA)	58.29		
Singapore 2025	Kaylee McKeown (AUS)	57.16	CR	

== World champions (short course) ==
=== Men ===
Edition	Winner	Time	Notes	Ref.
(Spain) Palma de Mallorca 1993	Tripp Schwenk (USA)	52.98	CR	
(Brazil) Rio de Janeiro 1995	Rodolfo Falcón (CUB)	53.12		
(Sweden) Gothenburg 1997	Neisser Bent (CUB)	52.77		
Hong Kong 1999	Rodolfo Falcón (CUB)	52.44	CR	
(Greece) Athens 2000	Neil Walker (USA)	50.75	WR	
(Russia) Moscow 2002	Matt Welsh (AUS)	51.26		
(United States) Indianapolis 2004	Aaron Peirsol (USA)	50.72	CR	
(China) Shanghai 2006	Matt Welsh (AUS)	51.09		
(United Kingdom) Manchester 2008	Liam Tancock (GBR)	50.14		
(United Arab Emirates) Dubai 2010	Stanislav Donets (RUS)	49.07	CR	
(Turkey) Istanbul 2012	Matt Grevers (USA)	49.89		
(Qatar) Doha 2014	Mitch Larkin (AUS)	49.57		
(Canada) Windsor 2016	Mitch Larkin (AUS)	49.65		
(China) Hangzhou 2018	Ryan Murphy (USA)	49.23		
(United Arab Emirates) Abu Dhabi 2021	Shaine Casas (USA)	49.23		
(Australia) Melbourne 2022	Ryan Murphy (USA)	48.50	CR	
(Hungary) Budapest 2024	Miron Lifintsev (NAB)	48.74		

=== Women ===
Edition	Winner	Time	Notes	Ref.
(Spain) Palma de Mallorca 1993	Angel Martino (USA)	58.50	WR	
(Brazil) Rio de Janeiro 1995	Misty Hyman (USA)	1:00.21		
(Sweden) Gothenburg 1997	Lu Donghua (CHN)	59.75		
Hong Kong 1999	Mai Nakamura (JPN)	58.67		
(Greece) Athens 2000	Sandra Völker (GER)	58.66		
(Russia) Moscow 2002	Haley Cope (USA)	59.07		
(United States) Indianapolis 2004	Haley Cope (USA)	59.03		
(China) Shanghai 2006	Janine Pietsch (GER)	58.02	CR	
(United Kingdom) Manchester 2008	Kirsty Coventry (ZIM)	57.10	CR	
(United Arab Emirates) Dubai 2010	Natalie Coughlin (USA)	56.08	CR	
(Turkey) Istanbul 2012	Olivia Smoliga (USA)	56.64		
(Qatar) Doha 2014	Katinka Hosszú (HUN)	55.03	WR	
(Canada) Windsor 2016	Katinka Hosszú (HUN)	55.54		
(China) Hangzhou 2018	Olivia Smoliga (USA)	56.19		
(United Arab Emirates) Abu Dhabi 2021	Louise Hansson (SWE)	55.20		
(Australia) Melbourne 2022	Kaylee McKeown (AUS)	55.49		
(Hungary) Budapest 2024	Regan Smith (USA)	54.55	CR	
