= Swimming at the 2008 Summer Olympics – Men's 100 metre backstroke =

Men's 100 metre backstroke at the Games of the XXIX Olympiad
- Venue: Beijing National Aquatics Center
- Date: August 10, 2008 (heats); August 11, 2008 (semifinals); August 12, 2008 (final)
- Competitors: 45 from 35 nations
- Winning time: 52.54 WR

Medalists
1st place, gold medalist(s)		Aaron Peirsol	United States
2nd place, silver medalist(s)		Matt Grevers	United States
3rd place, bronze medalist(s)		Hayden Stoeckel	Australia
3rd place, bronze medalist(s)		Arkady Vyatchanin	Russia

The men's 100 metre backstroke event at the 2008 Olympic Games took place on 10–12 August at the Beijing National Aquatics Center in Beijing, China.

Aaron Peirsol established a new world record of 52.54 to defend his Olympic title in the event. His teammate Matt Grevers earned a silver in 53.11, giving the United States a one-two finish. Meanwhile, Australia's Hayden Stoeckel and Russia's Arkady Vyatchanin, who both finished behind Grevers by 0.07 of a second, tied for the bronze medal in a matching time of 53.18.

Stoeckel's teammate Ashley Delaney finished fifth in 53.31, while Great Britain's Liam Tancock, who led a field in the first 50 metres, faded only to sixth place in 53.39. Spain's Aschwin Wildeboer (53.51) and Japan's Junichi Miyashita (53.99) rounded out the finale. For the first time in Olympic history, all eight swimmers went faster than a winning time of 54.09, previously set by Peirsol in Athens four years earlier.

Earlier, Grevers erased Peirsol's 2004 Olympic record of 53.45 to pick up a top seed in the prelims, until Stoeckel broke a 53-second barrier, and eventually lowered the record to 52.97 in the semifinals.

== Records ==
Prior to this competition, the existing world and Olympic records were as follows.

World record	Aaron Peirsol (USA)	52.89	Omaha, United States	1 July 2008
Olympic record	Aaron Peirsol (USA)	53.45	Athens, Greece	21 August 2004

The following new world and Olympic records were set during this competition.

Date	Event	Name	Nationality	Time	Record
August 10	Heat 4	Matt Grevers	United States	53.41	OR
August 11	Semifinal 1	Arkady Vyatchanin	Russia	53.06	OR
August 11	Semifinal 2	Hayden Stoeckel	Australia	52.97	OR
August 12	Final	Aaron Peirsol	United States	52.54	WR

== Results ==
=== Heats ===
Rank	Heat	Lane	Name	Nationality	Time	Notes
1	4	4	Matt Grevers	United States	53.41	Q, OR
2	4	5	Arkady Vyatchanin	Russia	53.64	Q
3	6	4	Aaron Peirsol	United States	53.65	Q
4	6	7	Aschwin Wildeboer	Spain	53.67	Q
5	3	5	Gerhard Zandberg	South Africa	53.75	Q, AF
6	6	5	Liam Tancock	Great Britain	53.85	Q
7	5	3	Hayden Stoeckel	Australia	53.93	Q
8	3	8	Ľuboš Križko	Slovakia	54.07	Q, NR
9	5	5	Ashley Delaney	Australia	54.08	Q
10	5	2	Junichi Miyashita	Japan	54.12	Q
11	4	2	Stanislav Donets	Russia	54.18	Q
12	4	3	Tomomi Morita	Japan	54.21	Q
13	6	3	Markus Rogan	Austria	54.22	Q
14	6	1	Mirco Di Tora	Italy	54.39	Q
15	5	1	Guy Barnea	Israel	54.50	Q
16	5	6	Gregor Tait	Great Britain	54.62	Q
17	4	6	Aristeidis Grigoriadis	Greece	54.71	
18	3	4	Damiano Lestingi	Italy	54.78	
19	5	4	Helge Meeuw	Germany	54.88	
20	6	2	Guilherme Guido	Brazil	54.89	
20	6	8	Răzvan Florea	Romania	54.89	
22	4	8	George Du Rand	South Africa	54.90	
23	3	7	Sung Min	South Korea	54.99	
24	4	1	Gordan Kožulj	Croatia	55.05	
25	3	3	Benjamin Stasiulis	France	55.08	
26	2	6	Omar Pinzón	Colombia	55.11	
27	3	6	Jonathan Massacand	Switzerland	55.21	NR
28	4	7	Nick Driebergen	Netherlands	55.31	
29	2	5	Pavel Sankovich	Belarus	55.39	
30	3	1	Derya Büyükuncu	Turkey	55.43	
31	5	8	Jake Tapp	Canada	55.54	
32	3	2	Vytautas Janušaitis	Lithuania	55.65	
33	6	6	Thomas Rupprath	Germany	55.77	
34	5	7	Marko Strahija	Croatia	55.89	
35	2	4	Örn Arnarson	Iceland	56.15	
36	2	3	Roland Rudolf	Hungary	56.25	
37	2	2	Sun Xiaolei	China	56.44	
38	2	8	Oleksandr Isakov	Ukraine	56.55	
39	1	4	Danil Bugakov	Uzbekistan	56.59	
40	2	7	Eduardo Germán Otero	Argentina	56.74	
41	2	1	Tomáš Fučík	Czech Republic	57.29	
42	1	5	Stanislav Osinsky	Kazakhstan	57.42	
43	1	3	Jared Heine	Marshall Islands	58.86	
44	1	2	Souhaib Kalala	Syria	1:00.24	
45	1	6	Rubel Mohammad Rana	Bangladesh	1:04.82	

=== Semifinals ===
Rank	Heat	Lane	Name	Nationality	Time	Notes
1	2	6	Hayden Stoeckel	Australia	52.97	Q, OR, OC
2	2	4	Matt Grevers	United States	52.99	Q
3	1	4	Arkady Vyatchanin	Russia	53.06	Q, ER
4	1	5	Aschwin Wildeboer	Spain	53.51	Q, NR
5	2	5	Aaron Peirsol	United States	53.56	Q
6	1	3	Liam Tancock	Great Britain	53.61	Q
7	1	2	Junichi Miyashita	Japan	53.69	Q
8	2	2	Ashley Delaney	Australia	53.76	Q
9	2	1	Markus Rogan	Austria	53.80	
10	1	7	Tomomi Morita	Japan	53.95	
11	2	3	Gerhard Zandberg	South Africa	53.98	
12	1	8	Gregor Tait	Great Britain	54.37	
13	1	6	Ľuboš Križko	Slovakia	54.38	
14	2	7	Stanislav Donets	Russia	54.57	
15	1	1	Mirco Di Tora	Italy	54.92	
16	2	8	Guy Barnea	Israel	54.93	

=== Final ===
Rank	Lane	Name	Nationality	Time	Notes
1st place, gold medalist(s)	2	Aaron Peirsol	United States	52.54	WR
2nd place, silver medalist(s)	5	Matt Grevers	United States	53.11	
3rd place, bronze medalist(s)	3	Arkady Vyatchanin	Russia	53.18	
3rd place, bronze medalist(s)	4	Hayden Stoeckel	Australia	53.18	
5	8	Ashley Delaney	Australia	53.31	
6	7	Liam Tancock	Great Britain	53.39	NR
7	6	Aschwin Wildeboer	Spain	53.51	
8	1	Junichi Miyashita	Japan	53.99	
