= Yury Raykhman =

Russian swimming coach

Yury Lvovich Raykhman
- Born: August 28, 1948 (age 77)
- Occupation: Swimming coach
- Years active: 1988–present
- Known for: Coaching prominent Russian swimmers
- Awards: Honored Coach of Russia

Yury Lvovich Raykhman (Russian: Юрий Львович Райхман; born August 28, 1948) is a Soviet - Russian swimming coach, he holds the title of Honored Coach of Russia. Since 1988, he has been coaching the Russian swimming national team.

== Biography and career ==
Yury Lvovich Raykhman was born in the Soviet Union, where he began his coaching career. He received higher education and defended his Candidate of Sciences dissertation under the scientific supervision of physiologist David Efremovich Rosenblum.

He joined the coaching staff of the Russian swimming national team in 1988, at the invitation of head coach Gennady Vaitsekhovsky, who valued a scientific approach to training athletes and sought comprehensive scientific support for the training process.

Since 1988, he has worked as a coach at the Center for Sports Training in the city of Dimitrovgrad.

By the order of the Governor of the Ulyanovsk Region dated December 25, 2009 No. 594-r, for achieving high performance in the economic, social, scientific-technical, and cultural development of the Ulyanovsk Region in 2009, conscientious labor and professional skill, Yury Raykhman was entered into the Honor Roll "Best People of the Ulyanovsk Region."

== Notable trainees ==
- Danila Izotov - Honored Master of Sports of Russia, two-time Olympic medalist, multiple World champion, European champion, Russian champion, two-time former world record holder, multiple Russian record holder.
- Stanislav Donets - Honored Master of Sports of Russia, multiple World champion, European champion, Russian champion, Multiple former world record holder, Russian record holder.
- Vladimir Bryukhov - Master of Sport of Russia, International Class, medalist at the European Championships, medalist at the Russian Championships.
- Kira Volodina - Master of Sport of Russia, International Class, multiple medalist at stages of the World Cup, Russian champion, multiple medalist at the Russian Championships.

== Family ==
Yury Raykhman coaches alongside his wife, Olga (née Donets), and they have a daughter and a son. Their son is Stanislav Donets.

== Quote ==
"The main task that I now set before my son is to be healthy."
