= Swimming at the 1967 Pan American Games – Women's 100 metre backstroke =

Women's 100 metre backstroke at the 1967 Pan American Games
- Venue: Pan Am Pool
- Dates: July 27 (preliminaries and finals)
- Competitors: from - nations

Medalists
Gold medal	Elaine Tanner	Canada
Silver medal	Kaye Hall	United States
Bronze medal	Shirley Cazalet	Canada

The women's 100 metre backstroke competition of the swimming events at the 1967 Pan American Games took place on 27 July at the Pan Am Pool. The last Pan American Games champion was Nina Harmer of US.

This race consisted of two lengths of the pool, all in backstroke.

== Results ==
All times are in minutes and seconds.

KEY:	q	Fastest non-qualifiers	Q	Qualified	GR	Games record	NR	National record	PB	Personal best	SB	Seasonal best

=== Final ===
The final was held on July 27.

Rank	Name	Nationality	Time	Notes
1st place, gold medalist(s)	Elaine Tanner	Canada	1:07.3	WR
2nd place, silver medalist(s)	Kaye Hall	United States	1:09.7	
3rd place, bronze medalist(s)	Shirley Cazalet	Canada	1:11.3	
4	-	-	-	
5	Ana Freire	Brazil	1:13.8	NR
6	-	-	-	
7	-	-	-	
8	Kendis Moore	United States	1:15.12	
