= 2009 European Short Course Swimming Championships =

Water sport competitions

- Host city: Istanbul, Turkey
- Date: 10–13 December 2009
- Venue: Abdi İpekçi Arena
- Nations: 41
- Events: 38

The 2009 European Short Course Swimming Championships was held in Istanbul, Turkey, from Thursday 10 to Sunday 13 December 2009. A temporary swimming pool was built within the Abdi İpekçi Arena.

The event was held over four days with: heats, semifinals and a final for the 50 m and 100 m events and heats and a final for all other events with the exception of the women's 800 m and men's 1500 m freestyle which were heat declared winners. Heats were held in the morning, with semifinals, finals and the fastest heat of the distance freestyle events in the evening.

Each nation was permitted to enter three swimmers into each individual event, however only the fastest two were able to progress to the semifinal and/or final.

== Participating nations ==
Of the 51 member nations of LEN, 41 participated in the championships. Albania and Liechtenstein made their European Short Course Championships debut.

- Albania
- Austria
- Azerbaijan
- Belarus
- Belgium
- Bosnia and Herzegovina
- Bulgaria
- Croatia
- Cyprus
- Czech Republic
- Denmark
- Estonia
- Faroe Islands
- Finland
- France
- Germany
- Great Britain
- Greece
- Hungary
- Iceland
- Ireland
- Israel
- Italy
- Latvia
- Liechtenstein
- Lithuania
- Luxembourg
- Netherlands
- Norway
- Poland
- Portugal
- Romania
- Russia
- Serbia
- Slovakia
- Slovenia
- Spain
- Sweden
- Switzerland
- Turkey
- Ukraine

== Medal table ==
Rank	Nation	Gold	Silver	Bronze	Total
1	Netherlands (NED)	10	3	1	14
2	Russia (RUS)	8	5	8	21
3	France (FRA)	6	2	3	11
4	Germany (GER)	5	3	4	12
5	Hungary (HUN)	3	4	1	8
6	Croatia (CRO)	2	3	0	5
7	Denmark (DEN)	2	1	5	8
8	Italy (ITA)	1	3	1	5
9	Austria (AUT)	1	0	1	2
9	Great Britain (GBR)	1	0	1	2
9	Norway (NOR)	1	0	1	2
12	Sweden (SWE)	0	3	2	5
13	Spain (ESP)	0	2	3	5
14	Poland (POL)	0	2	0	2
15	Serbia (SRB)	0	1	2	3
16	Belarus (BLR)	0	1	1	2
16	Slovenia (SLO)	0	1	1	2
18	Estonia (EST)	0	1	0	1
18	Lithuania (LTU)	0	1	0	1
20	Finland (FIN)	0	0	1	1
20	Israel (ISR)	0	0	1	1
20	Ukraine (UKR)	0	0	1	1
Totals (22 entries)		40	36	38	114

== Medal summary ==
=== Men's events ===
Event	Gold		Silver		Bronze	
50 m freestyle	Frédérick Bousquet; France	20.53	Duje Draganja; Croatia	20.70	Sergey Fesikov; Russia	20.84
100 m freestyle	Amaury Leveaux; France	45.56	Daniil Izotov; Russia	45.70	Yevgeny Lagunov; Russia	46.06
200 m freestyle	Paul Biedermann; Germany	1:39.81; CR	Danila Izotov; Russia	1:40.08	Nikita Lobintsev; Russia	1:41.52
400 m freestyle	Paul Biedermann; Germany	3:34.55; CR	Nikita Lobintsev; Russia	3:35.75	Mads Glæsner; Denmark	3:36.82
1500 m freestyle	Jan Wolfgarten; Germany	14:20.44	Federico Colbertaldo; Italy	14:25.68	Mads Glæsner; Denmark	14:26.74
50 m backstroke	Stanislav Donets; Russia	22.76; ER	Thomas Rupprath; Germany	22.85	Aschwin Wildeboer; Spain	23.07
100 m backstroke	Arkady Vyatchanin; Russia; Stanislav Donets; Russia	48.97; WR	None		Aschwin Wildeboer; Spain	49.05
200 m backstroke	Stanislav Donets; Russia	1:48.62; CR	Radosław Kawęcki; Poland	1:49.13	Evgeny Aleshin; Russia	1:49.31
50 m breaststroke	Aleksander Hetland; Norway	26.19	Alessandro Terrin; Italy	26.24	Čaba Silađi; Serbia	26.31; NR
100 m breaststroke	Robin van Aggele; Netherlands	56.29; ER	Dániel Gyurta; Hungary	56.72	Igor Borysik; Ukraine	56.97
200 m breaststroke	Dániel Gyurta; Hungary	2:00.67; WR	Grigory Falko; Russia	2:02.50	Maxim Shcherbakov; Russia	2:03.76
50 m butterfly	Johannes Dietrich; Germany	22.07; CR	Frédérick Bousquet; France	22.17	Yevgeny Korotyshkin; Russia	22.34
100 m butterfly	Yevgeny Korotyshkin; Russia	48.93; CR	Peter Mankoč; Slovenia	49.65	Ivan Lenđer; Serbia	49.79
200 m butterfly	Nikolay Skvortsov; Russia	1:49.46; ER	Paweł Korzeniowski; Poland	1:50.13; NR	Dinko Jukić; Austria	1:50.32
100 m individual medley	Duje Draganja; Croatia	51.20	Sergey Fesikov; Russia	51.29	Peter Mankoč; Slovenia	51.52
200 m individual medley	Markus Rogan; Austria	1:51.72; ER	Vytautas Janušaitis; Lithuania	1:52.22	Alan Cabello Forns; Spain	1:53.04
400 m individual medley	László Cseh; Hungary	3:57.27; WR	Dávid Verrasztó; Hungary	4:00.10	Gal Nevo; Israel	4:00.55; NR
4 × 50 m freestyle relay	France; Amaury Leveaux; Jérémy Stravius; David Maitre; Frédérick Bousquet	1:22.96	Croatia; Duje Draganja; Alexei Puninski; Mario Todorović; Mario Delač	1:23.18	Italy; Marco Orsi; Federico Bocchia; Filippo Magnini; Luca Dotto	1:23.64
4 × 50 m medley relay	Russia; Stanislav Donets; Sergey Geybel; Yevgeny Korotyshkin; Sergey Fesikov	1:31.80; WBT	Germany; Thomas Rupprath; Hendrik Feldwehr; Johannes Dietrich; Stefan Herbst	1:32.02	France; Benjamin Stasiulis; Hugues Duboscq; Frédérick Bousquet; Amaury Leveaux	1:32.13

Legend: WR – World record; WBT – World best time; ER – European record; CR – Championship record

=== Women's events ===
Event	Gold		Silver		Bronze	
50 m freestyle	Hinkelien Schreuder; Netherlands	23.32; CR	Ranomi Kromowidjojo; Netherlands	23.58	Dorothea Brandt; Germany	23.74
100 m freestyle	Inge Dekker; Netherlands	51.35; CR	Ranomi Kromowidjojo; Netherlands	51.44	Jeanette Ottesen; Denmark	52.18
200 m freestyle	Federica Pellegrini; Italy	1:51.17; WR	Evelyn Verrasztó; Hungary	1:52.61	Femke Heemskerk; Netherlands	1:54.20
400 m freestyle	Coralie Balmy; France	3:56.55	Lotte Friis; Denmark	3:59.06	Ophelie Cyrielle Etienne; France	3:59.94
800 m freestyle	Lotte Friis; Denmark	8:08.02	Erika Villaécija García; Spain	8:13.93	Ophelie Cyrielle Etienne; France	8:16.20
50 m backstroke	Sanja Jovanović; Croatia	25.70; WR	Aleksandra Gerasimenya; Belarus	26.12	Ksenia Moskvina; Russia	26.38
100 m backstroke	Ksenia Moskvina; Russia	56.36; ER	Sanja Jovanović; Croatia	56.93	Aleksandra Gerasimenya; Belarus	57.23
200 m backstroke	Alexianne Castel; France	2:02.67	Jenny Mensing; Germany	2:03.31	Pernille Larsen; Denmark	2:03.50
50 m breaststroke	Moniek Nijhuis; Netherlands	29.68; CR	Jane Trepp; Estonia	29.82	Janne Schaefer; Germany	29.92
100 m breaststroke	Caroline Ruhnau; Germany	1:04.84; CR	Moniek Nijhuis; Netherlands	1:04.96	Jennie Johansson; Sweden	1:05.19
200 m breaststroke	Rikke Møller-Pedersen; Denmark	2:16.66; ER	Nađa Higl; Serbia	2:17.52; NR	Joline Höstman; Sweden	2:19.28
50 m butterfly	Inge Dekker; Netherlands; Hinkelien Schreuder; Netherlands	25.00; CR	None		Ingvild Snildal; Norway	25.10
100 m butterfly	Inge Dekker; Netherlands	55.74	Diane Bui Duyet; France	55.93	Jeanette Ottesen; Denmark	56.02
200 m butterfly	Aurore Mongel; France	2:03.22; CR	Petra Granlund; Sweden	2:03.82	Franziska Hentke; Germany	2:04.68
100 m individual medley	Hinkelien Schreuder; Netherlands	57.85; CR	Evelyn Verrasztó; Hungary	58.21	Hanna-Maria Seppälä; Finland	58.86
200 m individual medley	Evelyn Verrasztó; Hungary	2:04.64; WR	Francesca Segat; Italy	2:06.21	Hannah Miley; Great Britain	2:06.96
400 m individual medley	Hannah Miley; Great Britain	4:25.66	Mireia Belmonte García; Spain	4:27.60	Zsuzsanna Jakabos; Hungary	4:28.46
4 × 50 m freestyle relay	Netherlands; Inge Dekker; Hinkelien Schreuder; Saskia de Jonge; Ranomi Kromowidjojo	1:33.25; WBT	Sweden; Emma Svensson; Josefin Lillhage; Claire Hedenskog; Sarah Sjöström	1:35.46	Germany; Dorothea Brandt; Daniela Samulski; Lisa Vitting; Daniela Schreiber	1:36.73
4 × 50 m medley relay	Netherlands; Hinkelien Schreuder; Moniek Nijhuis; Inge Dekker; Ranomi Kromowidjojo	1:42.69; WBT	Sweden; Emma Svensson; Josefin Lillhage; Sarah Sjöström; Claire Hedenskog	1:45.13	Russia; Ksenia Moskvina; Daria Deeva; Olga Klyuchnikova; Svetlana Fedulova	1:46.10

Legend: WR – World record; WBT – World best time; ER – European record; CR – Championship record

== Records ==
The table below lists the world (WR), European (ER) and Championships (CR) records broken at the meet. Times displayed in shaded cells were subsequently broken later in the meet.

Date	Event	Heat/Semifinal/Final	Name(s)	Nation	Time	CR	ER	WR
10 December	Men's 100 m breaststroke	Heat 6	Igor Borysik	Ukraine	57.33	=		
10 December	Men's 100 m breaststroke	Heat 7	Dániel Gyurta	Hungary	56.89	check	check	
10 December	Women's 100 m freestyle	Heat 5	Inge Dekker	Netherlands	51.85	check		
10 December	Men's 50 m backstroke	Heat 1 (4 × 50 m medley relay)	Stanislav Donets	Russia	23.04	check		
10 December	Men's 4 × 50 m medley relay	Heat 1	Stanislav Donets; Stanislav Lakhtyukhov; Yevgeny Korotyshkin; Yevgeny Lagunov	Russia	1:32.08	check	check	WBT
10 December	Men's 400 m freestyle	Final	Paul Biedermann	Germany	3:34.55	check		
10 December	Men's 200 m backstroke	Final	Stanislav Donets	Russia	1:48.62	check		
10 December	Women's 100 m backstroke	Semifinal 2	Ksenia Moskvina	Russia	56.74	check		
10 December	Women's 200 m individual medley	Final	Evelyn Verrasztó	Hungary	2:04.64	check	check	check
10 December	Men's 100 m breaststroke	Semifinal 2	Dániel Gyurta	Hungary	56.79	check	check	
10 December	Women's 200 m butterfly	Final	Aurore Mongel	France	2:03.22	check		
10 December	Men's 200 m individual medley	Final	Markus Rogan	Austria	1:51.72	check	check	
10 December	Women's 100 m freestyle	Semifinal 1	Ranomi Kromowidjojo	Netherlands	51.54	check		
10 December	Women's 50 m breaststroke	Final	Moniek Nijhuis	Netherlands	29.68	check		
10 December	Men's 50 m backstroke	Final (4 × 50 m medley relay)	Stanislav Donets	Russia	22.86	check	check	
10 December	Men's 4 × 50 m medley relay	Final	Stanislav Donets; Sergey Geybel; Yevgeny Korotyshkin; Sergey Fesikov	Russia	1:31.80	check	check	WBT
11 December	Men's 50 m backstroke	Heat 5	Stanislav Donets	Russia	22.80	check	check	
11 December	Women's 50 m butterfly	Heat 3	Hinkelien Schreuder	Netherlands	25.13	check		
11 December	Women's 100 m individual medley	Heat 4	Katharina Stiberg	Norway	59.12	check		
11 December	Men's 50 m backstroke	Semifinal 2	Stanislav Donets	Russia	22.79	check	check	
11 December	Women's 50 m butterfly	Semifinal 1	Inge Dekker	Netherlands	25.09	check		
11 December	Men's 400 m individual medley	Final	László Cseh	Hungary	3:57.27	check	check	check
11 December	Women's 200 m breaststroke	Final	Rikke Møller-Pedersen	Denmark	2:16.66	check	check	
11 December	Men's 50 m breaststroke	Final (100 m breaststroke)	Robin van Aggele	Netherlands	26.34	check		
11 December	Men's 100 m breaststroke	Final	Robin van Aggele	Netherlands	56.29	check	check	
11 December	Women's 100 m freestyle	Final	Inge Dekker	Netherlands	51.35	check		
11 December	Women's 100 m backstroke	Final	Ksenia Moskvina	Russia	56.36	check	check	
11 December	Men's 100 m butterfly	Final	Yevgeny Korotyshkin	Russia	48.93	check		
11 December	Women's 100 m individual medley	Semifinal 1	Evelyn Verrasztó	Hungary	58.61	check		
11 December	Women's 50 m butterfly	Final	Inge Dekker; Hinkelien Schreuder	Netherlands; Netherlands	25.00	check		
11 December	Men's 50 m backstroke	Final	Stanislav Donets	Russia	22.76	check	check	
11 December	Women's 50 m freestyle	Final (4 × 50 m freestyle relay)	Inge Dekker	Netherlands	23.53	check		
11 December	Women's 4 × 50 m freestyle relay	Final	Inge Dekker; Hinkelien Schreuder; Saskia de Jonge; Ranomi Kromowidjojo	Netherlands	1:33.25	check	check	WBT
12 December	Men's 100 m individual medley	Heat 5	Sergey Fesikov	Russia	51.35	check		
12 December	Women's 100 m butterfly	Heat 3	Jeanette Ottesen	Denmark	56.66	check		
12 December	Men's 50 m breaststroke	Semifinal 1	Fabio Scozzoli	Italy	26.23	check		
12 December	Men's 50 m breaststroke	Semifinal 2	Alessandro Terrin	Italy	26.14	check	check	
12 December	Men's 100 m individual medley	Semifinal 1	Peter Mankoč	Slovenia	50.76	check	check	check
12 December	Men's 100 m backstroke	Semifinal 1	Arkady Vyatchanin	Russia	49.17	check	check	check
12 December	Women's 100 m individual medley	Final	Hinkelien Schreuder	Netherlands	57.85	check		
12 December	Men's 200 m butterfly	Final	Nikolay Skvortsov	Russia	1:49.46	check	check	
12 December	Women's 100 m butterfly	Semifinal 1	Diane Bui Duyet	France	55.05	check	check	check
12 December	Women's 50 m backstroke	Final	Sanja Jovanović	Croatia	25.70	check	check	check
12 December	Women's 4 × 50 m medley relay	Final	Hinkelien Schreuder; Moniek Nijhuis; Inge Dekker; Ranomi Kromowidjojo	Netherlands	1:42.69	check	check	WBT
13 December	Women's 50 m freestyle	Heat 5	Hinkelien Schreuder	Netherlands	23.46	check		
13 December	Men's 200 m breaststroke	Heat 3	Grigory Falko	Russia	2:03.88	check		
13 December	Men's 200 m breaststroke	Heat 5	Dániel Gyurta	Hungary	2:03.25	check		
13 December	Men's 200 m freestyle	Heat 6	Danila Izotov	Russia	1:40.87	check		
13 December	Men's 50 m butterfly	Semifinal 2	Johannes Dietrich	Germany	22.13	check		
13 December	Men's 200 m breaststroke	Final	Dániel Gyurta	Hungary	2:00.67	check	check	check
13 December	Women's 200 m freestyle	Final	Federica Pellegrini	Italy	1:51.17	check	check	check
13 December	Men's 200 m freestyle	Final	Paul Biedermann	Germany	1:39.81	check		
13 December	Women's 100 m breaststroke	Final	Caroline Ruhnau	Germany	1:04.84	check		
13 December	Men's 100 m backstroke	Final	Arkady Vyatchanin; Stanislav Donets	Russia; Russia	48.97	check	check	check
13 December	Men's 50 m butterfly	Final	Johannes Dietrich	Germany	22.07	check		
13 December	Women's 50 m freestyle	Final	Hinkelien Schreuder	Netherlands	23.32	check		

== See also ==
- 2009 in swimming
