= Stanislav Donets =

Russian swimmer from Dimitrovgrad

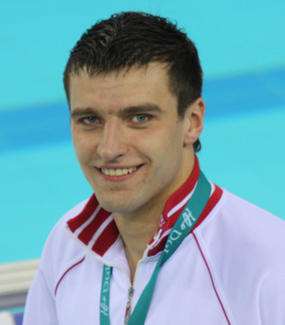
- at the World Short Course Championships in Dubai 2010

Personal information
- Full name: Stanislav Yuryevich Donets
- Nationality: Russia
- Born: 7 July 1983 (age 43) Dimitrovgrad, Russia
- Height: 1.93 m (6 ft 4 in)
- Weight: 84 kg (185 lb)

Sport
- Sport: Swimming
- Strokes: Backstroke
- Club: Sportschool Dimitrovgrad
Medal record
Men's swimming
Representing Russia
World Championships (SC)
Gold medal – first place	2008 Manchester	4x100 m medley
Gold medal – first place	2010 Dubai	50 m backstroke
Gold medal – first place	2010 Dubai	100 m backstroke
Silver medal – second place	2010 Dubai	4×100 m medley
Silver medal – second place	2012 Istanbul	100 m backstroke
Silver medal – second place	2012 Istanbul	4×100 m medley
Bronze medal – third place	2008 Manchester	100 m backstroke
Bronze medal – third place	2008 Manchester	200 m backstroke
Bronze medal – third place	2012 Istanbul	50 m backstroke
Bronze medal – third place	2014 Doha	50 m backstroke
European Championships (LC)
Gold medal – first place	2010 Budapest	200 m backstroke
Silver medal – second place	2010 Budapest	4×100 m medley
European Championships (SC)
Gold medal – first place	2007 Debrecen	100 m backstroke
Gold medal – first place	2008 Rijeka	50 m backstroke
Gold medal – first place	2008 Rijeka	100 m backstroke
Gold medal – first place	2008 Rijeka	200 m backstroke
Gold medal – first place	2009 Istanbul	50 m backstroke
Gold medal – first place	2009 Istanbul	100 m backstroke
Gold medal – first place	2009 Istanbul	200 m backstroke
Gold medal – first place	2009 Istanbul	4×50 m medley
Gold medal – first place	2010 Eindhoven	50 m backstroke
Gold medal – first place	2010 Eindhoven	100 m backstroke
Silver medal – second place	2007 Debrecen	200 m backstroke
Silver medal – second place	2007 Debrecen	4×50 m medley
Silver medal – second place	2008 Rijeka	4×50 m medley
Silver medal – second place	2015 Netanya	100 m backstroke
Bronze medal – third place	2010 Eindhoven	4×50 m medley

Stanislav Yuryevich Donets (Russian: Станисла́в Ю́рьевич Доне́ц; born 7 July 1983) is a Russian swimmer from Dimitrovgrad. Honored Master of Sports of Russia, multiple World champion, European champion, Russian champion, Multiple former world record holder, Russian record holder. He was coached by his father, Yury Lvovich Raykhman, an Honored Coach of Russia.

== See also ==
- World record progression 100 metres backstroke

Records
Preceded by Peter Marshall; Arkady Vyatchanin	Men's 100 metres Backstroke; World Record Holder (Short Course); 14 December 2008 – 21 December 2008; 13 December 2009 – 18 December 2009 (tied Vyatchanin)	Succeeded by Aschwin Wildeboer; Nick Thoman
