= Hilal Hemed Hilal =

Tanzanian swimmer (born 1994)

Personal information
- Born: July 12, 1994 (age 31) Sharjah, United Arab Emirates

Sport
- Sport: Swimming

Hilal Hemed Hilal (born 12 July 1994) is a Tanzanian swimmer. He competed in the 50 m butterfly, 50 m, 100 m freestyle, 50 m, 100 m backstroke and 50 m breaststroke events at the 2012 FINA World Swimming Championships (25 m). Hilal also took part in the 50 m freestyle and 50 m butterfly events at the 2013 World Aquatics Championships. He ranked 49th at the Rio 2016 Summer Olympics in 50 m freestyle.
