= Arkady Vyatchanin =

Russian-Serbian swimmer (born 1984)

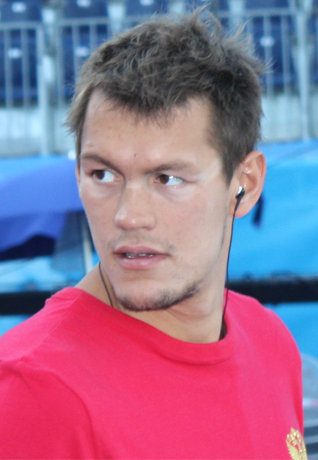

Personal information
- Full name: Arkady Arkadyevich Vyatchanin
- Nationality: Russia; Serbia; United States
- Born: 4 April 1984 (age 42) Vorkuta, Russian SFSR, Soviet Union
- Height: 2.02 m (6 ft 8 in)
- Weight: 91 kg (201 lb)

Sport
- Sport: Swimming
- Strokes: Backstroke
- Club: Taganrog Army Club; Federal Protective Service; New York Athletic Club
- Coach: Lyudmila Shalyapina (aunt); Arkady Vyatchanin (father); Irina Vyatchanina (mother); Gregg Troy
Medal record
Representing Russia
Olympic Games
Bronze medal – third place	2008 Beijing	100 m backstroke
Bronze medal – third place	2008 Beijing	200 m backstroke
World Championships (LC)
Silver medal – second place	2003 Barcelona	100 m backstroke
Silver medal – second place	2003 Barcelona	4×100 m medley
Silver medal – second place	2005 Montreal	4×100 m medley
Bronze medal – third place	2007 Melbourne	4×100 m medley
World Championships (SC)
Bronze medal – third place	2004 Indianapolis	200 m backstroke
Bronze medal – third place	2004 Indianapolis	4×100 m medley
European Championships (LC)
Gold medal – first place	2006 Budapest	100 m backstroke
Gold medal – first place	2006 Budapest	200 m backstroke
Gold medal – first place	2006 Budapest	4×100 m medley
Gold medal – first place	2008 Eindhoven	4×100 m medley
Silver medal – second place	2008 Eindhoven	200 m backstroke
Bronze medal – third place	2008 Eindhoven	100 m backstroke
European Championships (SC)
Gold medal – first place	2009 Istanbul	100 m backstroke
Gold medal – first place	2006 Helsinki	100 m backstroke
Gold medal – first place	2006 Helsinki	200 m backstroke
Silver medal – second place	2005 Trieste	50 m backstroke
Silver medal – second place	2005 Trieste	100 m backstroke
Silver medal – second place	2005 Trieste	200 m backstroke

Arkady Arkadyevich Vyatchanin (Russian: Аркадий Аркадьевич Вятча́нин, Serbian Cyrillic: Аркадиј Аркадјевич Вјатчањин; born 4 April 1984) is a retired Russian, Serbian and American backstroke swimmer. He was born in Vorkuta, and in 1999 moved to Taganrog, Russia, where he graduated from the South Federal University. He was a member of the Russian National Team in 2000–2015; moved to Serbia in 2015 and to the United States in 2017, and retired in June 2018.

== Family ==
Vyatchanin came from a swimming family and was initially trained by his aunt, father and mother, who were all retired competitive swimmers and professional swimming coaches. His father Arkady Sr. (1946–2014) held nine Soviet swimming titles and was a member of the Soviet team from 1965 to 1971. His mother Irina and elder sister Alla competed at the national level. Vyatchanin is married to Evgeniya.

== Change of nationality ==
In 2013 Vyatchanin announced an intention to leave the Russian team and compete for another country saying he gave all he could to team Russia. In 2015 he obtained Serbian citizenship (name in Serbian: Arkadij Vjatčanjin), but could not complete internationally because of administrative errors in his international transfer. Hence he missed the 2016 Summer Olympics. In 2017 Vyatchanin obtained American citizenship. He retired in June 2018 aiming to become a swimming coach.

== See also ==
- World record progression 100 metres backstroke
- World record progression 200 metres backstroke

Records
Preceded by Helge Meeuw	Men's 200 metre backstroke European record holder (long course); 5 August 2006 – 2 August 2013	Succeeded by Radosław Kawęcki
Preceded by George Du Rand	Men's 200 metre backstroke world record holder (short course); 15 November 2009 – 27 November 2015	Succeeded by Mitch Larkin
Preceded by Markus Rogan	Men's 200 metre backstroke European record holder (short course); 15 November 2009 – present	Succeeded by Incumbent
Preceded by Aschwin Wildeboer	Men's 100 metre backstroke world record holder (short course); 12 December 2009 – 18 December 2009	Succeeded by Nick Thoman
Preceded by Aschwin Wildeboer	Men's 100 metre backstroke European record holder (short course); 12 December 2009 – 19 December 2010	Succeeded by Stanislav Donets
