= Cheng Feiyi =

Chinese swimmer

Personal information
- Full name: Cheng Feiyi
- Nationality: China
- Born: January 6, 1991 (age 35) Liaoning, China
- Height: 1.79 m (5 ft 10 in)
- Weight: 73 kg (161 lb)

Sport
- Sport: Swimming
- Strokes: Backstroke
- Club: Liaoning Swimming Team

Cheng Feiyi is a Chinese swimmer. At the 2012 Summer Olympics he finished 3rd in the first semifinal in the men's 100 metre backstroke, and finished in 8th place in the final. He was also part of Chinese men's 4 x 100 m medley relay team at those Olympics.
