= Nick Thoman =

American swimmer (born 1986)

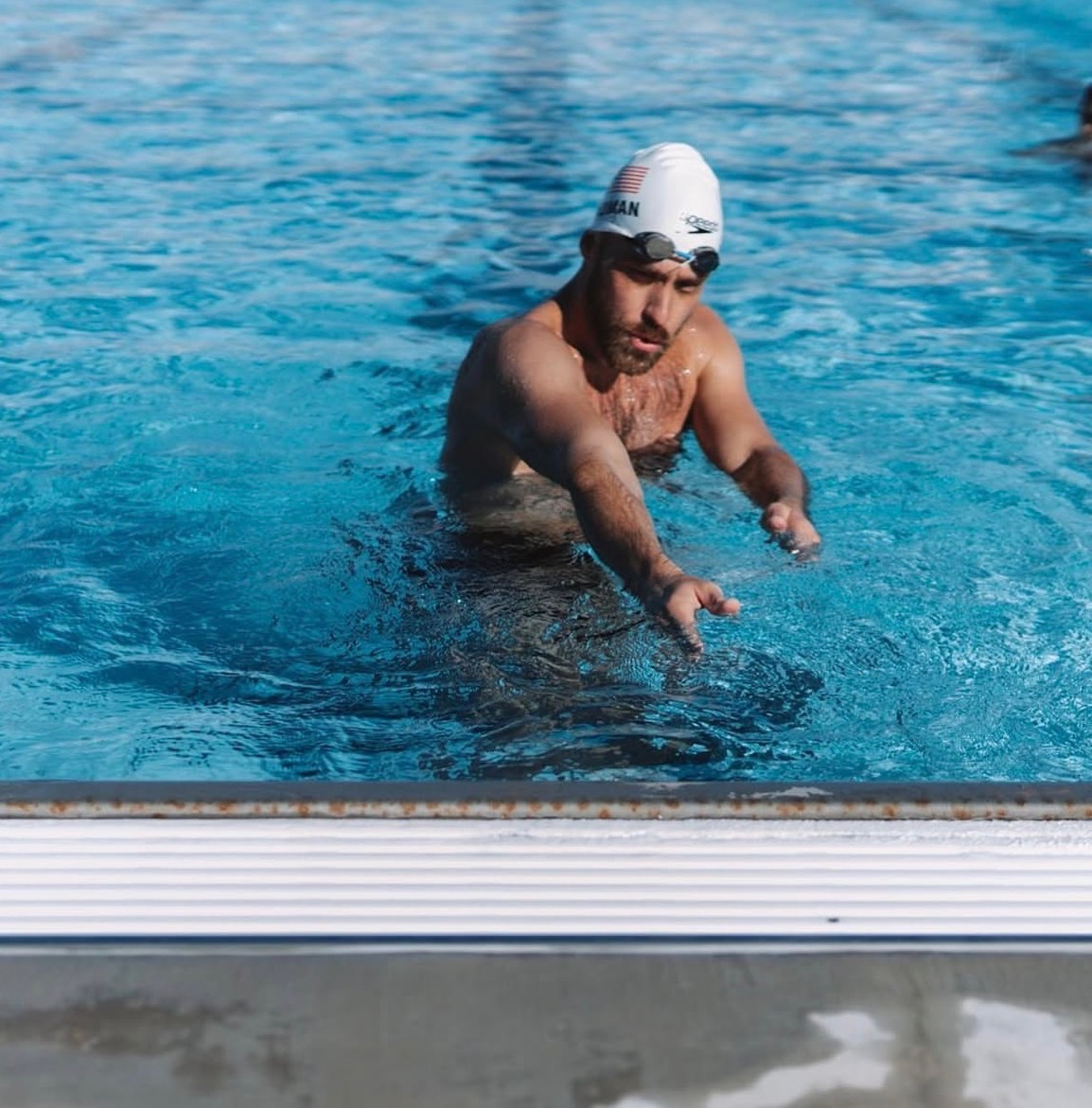
- Nick Thoman giving instructions on a swim drill.

Personal information
- Full name: Nicholas Brewer Thoman
- Nickname: "Nick"
- National team: United States
- Born: March 6, 1986 (age 40) Cincinnati, Ohio, U.S.
- Height: 6 ft 1 in (185 cm)
- Weight: 185 lb (84 kg)
- Spouse: Chrissy Thoman
- Website: www.thomanswims.com

Sport
- Sport: Swimming
- Strokes: Backstroke
- Club: Tucson Ford Aquatics, SwimMAC Carolina, and Cincinnati Aquatic Club
- College team: University of Arizona
Medal record
Men's swimming
Representing the United States
Olympic Games
Gold medal – first place	2012 London	4x100 m medley
Silver medal – second place	2012 London	100 m backstroke
World Championships (LC)
Gold medal – first place	2011 Shanghai	4×100 m medley
World Championships (SC)
Gold medal – first place	2010 Dubai	4×100 m medley
Pan Pacific Championships
Bronze medal – third place	2010 Irvine	50 m backstroke
Pan American Games
Gold medal – first place	2015 Toronto	100 m backstroke
Silver medal – second place	2015 Toronto	4×100 m medley
Universiade
Silver medal – second place	2007 Bangkok	4x100 m medley
Bronze medal – third place	2007 Bangkok	100 m backstroke
Bronze medal – third place	2007 Bangkok	200 m backstroke

Nicholas Brewer Thoman (born March 6, 1986) is an American competition swimmer who specializes in the backstroke and is an Olympic gold medalist. He has won two world championships as a member of winning United States medley relay teams at the FINA World Aquatics Championships. From 2009 to 2015 he held the world record in the 100-meter backstroke (short course). Thoman has won a total of ten medals in major international competition, four gold, three silver, and three bronze spanning the Olympics, World Championships, Pan Pacific Championships, Pan American Games, and the Summer Universiade. He was a member of the 2012 U.S. Olympic team, and won gold and silver medals at the 2012 Summer Olympics.

On December 6, 2013, at the U.S. national championships in Knoxville Tennessee, Thoman set three American records in one evening. He broke the American record in the 50-yard backstroke (20.69), was part of an American record-breaking 200-yard medley relay (with E. Knight, T. Phillips and C. Jones, 1:23.02) and shattered the American record in the 100-yard backstroke with a time of 44.07.

== Career ==
Thoman was born in Cincinnati, Ohio. He swam for Cincinnati Aquatic Club under head coach Benson Spurling from age 8 through high school. He attended Mariemont High School in the suburbs of Cincinnati and was coached by Kevin Maness. At the 2009 Duel in the Pool, a short course meet, Thoman combined with Mark Gangloff, Michael Phelps, and Nathan Adrian in 4×100-meter medley relay to break the world record previously held by Canada. While leading off the relay, Thoman also broke the world record in the 100-meter backstroke with a time of 48.94.

At the 2010 National Championships, Thoman qualified to swim at the 2010 Pan Pacific Swimming Championships in the 50, 100 and 200-meter backstroke. In the 100-meter backstroke final at the 2010 National Championships, Thoman was out first at the first 50 with a time of 25.80. However, he faded to third place with a time of 53.78, finishing behind David Plummer and Aaron Peirsol. In the 200-meter backstroke final, Thoman finished in 5th place with a time of 1:57.7. At the 2010 Pan Pacific Swimming Championships, Thoman won bronze in the 50-meter backstroke.

At the 2010 FINA Short Course World Championships in Dubai, Thoman won a gold medal in the 4×100-meter medley relay with Mihail Alexandrov, Ryan Lochte, and Garrett Weber-Gale. Thoman also competed in the 50 and 100-meter backstroke in Dubai but finished out of medal contention in both events.

At the 2011 World Aquatics Championships in Shanghai, China, Thoman placed fourth in the final of the 100-meter backstroke with a time of 53.01. In the 4×100-meter medley relay with Mark Gangloff, Michael Phelps, and Nathan Adrian, Thoman won gold with a time of 3:32.06. Swimming the backstroke leg, Thoman had a time of 53.61.

=== 2012 Summer Olympics ===
At the 2012 U.S. Olympic Trials in Omaha, Nebraska, the U.S. qualifying meet for the Olympics, Thoman made the U.S. Olympic team for the first time by finishing second in the 100-meter backstroke in a time of 52.86. Thoman also placed third in the 200-meter backstroke with a time of 1:57.06, missing a spot in that event.

At the 2012 Summer Olympics in London, Thoman won his inaugural Olympic medal, a silver, in the 100-meter backstroke. In the final, Thoman placed second behind fellow American Matt Grevers with a time of 52.92. He also earned a gold medal swimming the backstroke leg for the winning U.S. team in the preliminaries of the 4×100-meter medley relay.

== Personal bests ==
As of December 18, 2010.

Event	Time	Venue	Date	Note(s)
50 m backstroke (long course)	25.02	Irvine	August 19, 2010	
100 m backstroke (long course)	52.51	Federal Way	August 7, 2009	
200 m backstroke (long course)	1:54.59	Federal Way	August 5, 2009	
50 m backstroke (short course)	23.28	Dubai	December 18, 2010	
100 m backstroke (short course)	48.94	Manchester	December 18, 2009	Former WR
200 m backstroke (short course)	1:50.05	Manchester	December 18, 2009	

Key: WR = World record

== See also ==
- List of Olympic medalists in swimming (men)
- List of United States records in swimming
- List of University of Arizona people
- List of World Aquatics Championships medalists in swimming (men)
- List of world records in swimming
- World record progression 100 metres backstroke
- World record progression 4 × 100 metres medley relay

Records
Preceded by Shared between Arkady Vyatchanin & Stanislav Donets	Men's 100-meter backstroke world record-holder (short course); December 18, 2009 – December 12, 2015	Succeeded by Matt Grevers
