= Damiano Lestingi =

Italian swimmer (born 1989)

Personal information
- Nationality: Italy
- Born: 22 April 1989 (age 37) Civitavecchia, Italy
- Height: 1.87 m (6 ft 2 in)
- Weight: 77 kg (170 lb)

Sport
- Sport: Swimming
- Event: Backstroke
Medal record
Men's swimming
Representing Italy
Event	1st	2nd	3rd
European Championships	0	2	1
Mediterranean Games	1	1	1
Total	1	3	2
European Championships (SC)
Silver medal – second place	2010 Eindhoven	100 m backstroke
Silver medal – second place	2010 Eindhoven	200 m backstroke
Bronze medal – third place	2012 Chartres	100 m backstroke
Mediterranean Games
Gold medal – first place	2013 Mersin	4×200 m freestyle
Silver medal – second place	2013 Mersin	200 m backstroke
Bronze medal – third place	2009 Pescara	200 m backstroke

Damiano Lestingi (born 22 April 1989) is an Italian swimmer.

== Biography ==
He competed in the 2008 Summer Olympics.

== Achievements ==
Year	Competition	Venue	Position	Event	Performance	Note
2008	Olympic Games	(China) Beijing	18th	100 m backstroke	54.78	
2008	Olympic Games	(China) Beijing	11th	200 m backstroke	1:58.25	
