= Mirco Di Tora =

Italian swimmer (born 1986)

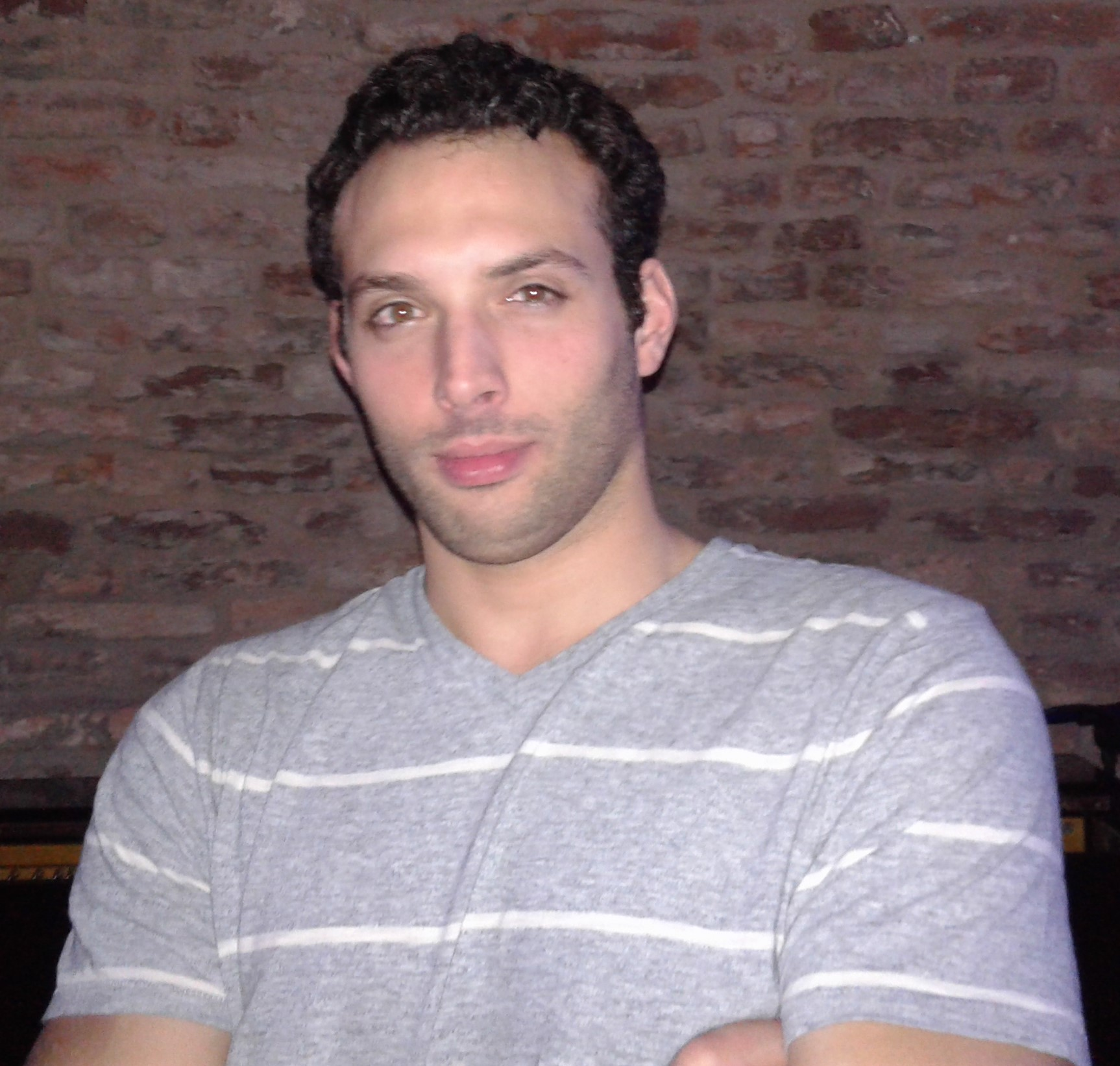

Personal information
- Nationality: Italy
- Born: 19 May 1986 (age 40) Ferrara, Italy
- Height: 188 cm (6 ft 2 in)
- Weight: 83 kg (183 lb)

Sport
- Sport: Swimming
- Strokes: Backstroke
Medal record
European LC Championships
Gold medal – first place	2012 Debrecen	4x100 m medley
Silver medal – second place	2012 Debrecen	50 m backstroke
European SC Championships
Gold medal – first place	2008 Rijeka	4×50 m medley relay
Gold medal – first place	2011 Szczecin	4×50 m medley relay
Silver medal – second place	2010 Eindhoven	4×50 m medley relay
Mediterranean Games
Bronze medal – third place	2009 Pescara	100 m backstroke

Mirco Di Tora (born 19 May 1986) is a male Italian swimmer.

Di Tora is an athlete of the Gruppo Sportivo Fiamme Oro.

== Biography ==
In 2012 Mirco Di Tora qualified for his second Olympic appearance in London 2012. He is a former Italian record-holder in the 50 and 100 metres backstroke.

== Achievements ==
Year	Competition	Venue	Position	Event	Performance	Notes
2008	Olympic Games	(China) Beijing	15th	100 m Backstroke	54"92	(Note: In heat he had a better time, 54"39.)
2008	Olympic Games	(China) Beijing	DSQ	4 × 100 m medley	3'34"32	

== See also ==
- Italy at the 2012 Summer Olympics - Swimming
