= Aschwin Wildeboer =

Spanish swimmer (born 1986)

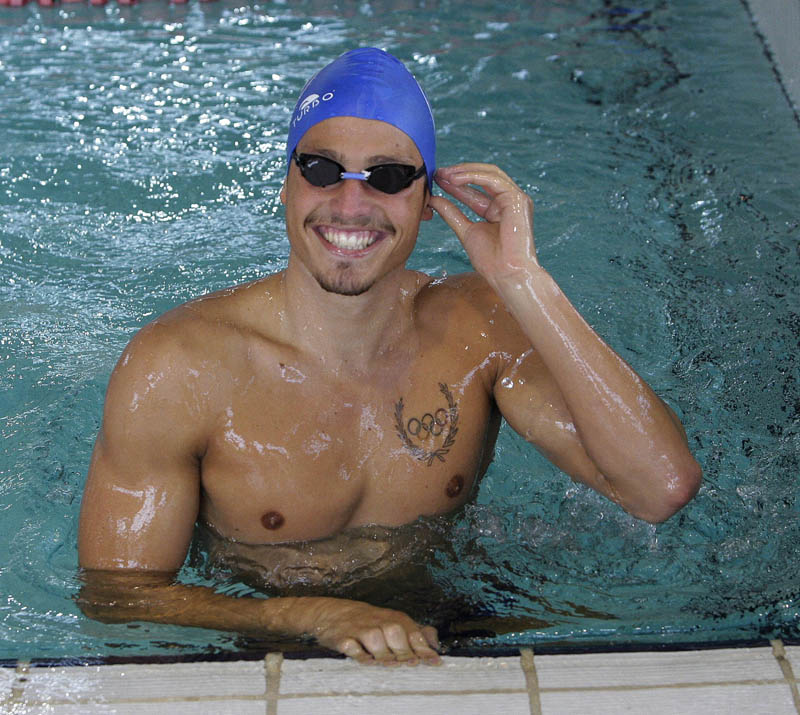

Personal information
- Full name: Aschwin Wildeboer Faber
- Nationality: Spain
- Born: 14 February 1986 (age 40) Sabadell, Catalonia, Spain
- Height: 1.83 m (6 ft 0 in)
- Weight: 80 kg (176 lb)

Sport
- Sport: Swimming
- Strokes: Backstroke
Medal record
Men's swimming
Representing Spain
World Championships (LC)
| Bronze medal – third place | 2009 Rome | 100 m backstroke |
World Championships (SC)
| Silver medal – second place | 2010 Dubai | 50 m backstroke |
| Bronze medal – third place | 2010 Dubai | 100 m backstroke |
European Championships (SC)
| Gold medal – first place | 2008 Rijeka | 200 m backstroke |
| Gold medal – first place | 2011 Szczecin | 50 m backstroke |
| Silver medal – second place | 2008 Rijeka | 50 m backstroke |
| Silver medal – second place | 2008 Rijeka | 100 m backstroke |
| Silver medal – second place | 2011 Szczecin | 100 m backstroke |
| Silver medal – second place | 2011 Szczecin | 200 m backstroke |
| Bronze medal – third place | 2007 Debrecen | 50 m backstroke |
| Bronze medal – third place | 2007 Debrecen | 200 m backstroke |
| Bronze medal – third place | 2009 Istanbul | 50 m backstroke |
| Bronze medal – third place | 2009 Istanbul | 100 m backstroke |
Mediterranean Games
| Gold medal – first place | 2009 Pescara | 50 m backstroke |
| Gold medal – first place | 2009 Pescara | 100 m backstroke |
| Gold medal – first place | 2009 Pescara | 200 m backstroke |
| Gold medal – first place | 2009 Pescara | 4×100 m medley |

Aschwin Wildeboer Faber (Note: In this Spanish name, the first or paternal surname is Wildeboer and the second or maternal family name is Faber.) (born 14 February 1986 in Sabadell, Spain), known as Aschwin Wildeboer, is a Spanish Olympic backstroke swimmer of Dutch origin.

== Biography ==
His parents, both born and raised in Netherlands, moved to Spain in 1978 and settled in Sabadell, where his father Paulus Wildeboer became the head coach of the local swimming club, called Club Natació Sabadell. He and his parents now live in Denmark, because his father is the Danish national team coach.

== Career ==
Both Aschwin and his older brother, Olaf, a freestyle swimmer, represented Spain at the 2004 Summer Olympics. At the 2004 Olympics, Aschwin was eliminated in the qualifying heats of the 100 m and 200 m backstroke. Since 2004, Aschwin has continued to swim internationally for Spain; however, Olaf began swimming for the Netherlands at the 2006 European Championships.

Aschwin swam again for Spain in the 2008 Summer Olympics, achieving a new Spanish record in the 100 m backstroke (53.51) and finishing seventh.

On 21 December 2008, while swimming at the Spanish Short Course Championships, Wildeboer broke the men's 100-meter backstroke world record with a time of 49.20 seconds—0.13 seconds faster than the previous world record set by Stanislav Donets.

On 1 July 2009, in the Mediterranean Games held in Pescara (Italy), Wildeboer broke the men's 100 m backstroke long course World Record with a time of 52.38—0.16 seconds faster than the previous world record set by Aaron Peirsol in the Beijing Olympics the previous year. Peirsol soon reclaimed the world record.

== See also ==
- World record progression 100 metres backstroke

== Notes ==
Records
| Preceded by Aaron Peirsol | Men's 100 metre backstroke world record holder (long course); 1 July 2009 – 8 July 2009 | Succeeded by Aaron Peirsol |
