= 2018 Pan Pacific Swimming Championships – Men's 200 metre backstroke =

Men's 200 metre backstroke at the 2018 Pan Pacific Swimming Championships
- Venue: Tokyo Tatsumi International Swimming Center
- Dates: 12 August (heats & finals)
- Competitors: 20 from 8 nations
- Winning time: 1:53.57

Medalists
gold medal	Ryan Murphy	United States
silver medal	Ryosuke Irie	Japan
bronze medal	Austin Katz	United States

The men's 200 metre backstroke competition at the 2018 Pan Pacific Swimming Championships took place on August 12 at the Tokyo Tatsumi International Swimming Center. The defending champion was Tyler Clary of the United States.

== Records ==
Prior to this competition, the existing world and Pan Pacific records were as follows:

World record	Aaron Peirsol (USA)	1:51.92	Rome, Italy	31 July 2009
Pan Pacific Championships record	Ryan Lochte (USA)	1:54.12	Irvine, United States	20 August 2010

== Results ==
All times are in minutes and seconds.

KEY:	QA	Qualified A Final	QB	Qualified B Final	CR	Championships record	NR	National record	PB	Personal best	SB	Seasonal best

=== Heats ===
The first round was held on 12 August from 10:00.

Only two swimmers from each country may advance to the A or B final. If a country not qualify any swimmer to the A final, that same country may qualify up to three swimmers to the B final.

Rank	Name	Nationality	Time	Notes
1	Ryan Murphy	United States	1:54.07	QA, CR
2	Austin Katz	United States	1:55.69	QA
3	Jacob Pebley	United States	1:55.95	QB
4	Ryosuke Irie	Japan	1:56.83	QA
5	Keita Sunama	Japan	1:57.18	QA
6	Mitch Larkin	Australia	1:58.15	QA
7	Bradley Woodward	Australia	1:58.24	QA
8	Javier Acevedo	Canada	1:58.74	QA
9	Leonardo de Deus	Brazil	1:59.59	QA
10	Wang Yutian	China	1:59.90	QB
11	Markus Thormeyer	Canada	2:00.04	QB
12	Masaki Kaneko	Japan	2:00.24	QB
13	Jay Litherland	United States	2:00.26	QB
14	Gabriel Fantoni	Brazil	2:01.01	~~QB~~, WD
15	Brandonn Almeida	Brazil	2:01.74	QB
16	Lewis Clareburt	New Zealand	2:02.13	QB
17	Leonardo Santos	Brazil	2:03.35	QB
18	Josiah Binnema	Canada	2:06.45	
19	Armand Chan	Philippines	2:18.39	
–	Clyde Lewis	Australia	DNS	

=== B Final ===
The B final was held on 12 August from 17:30.

Rank	Name	Nationality	Time	Notes
9	Jacob Pebley	United States	1:57.12	
10	Markus Thormeyer	Canada	1:59.37	
11	Jay Litherland	United States	1:59.52	
12	Wang Yutian	China	1:59.97	
13	Masaki Kaneko	Japan	2:00.58	
14	Brandonn Almeida	Brazil	2:00.79	
15	Lewis Clareburt	New Zealand	2:01.10	
16	Leonardo Santos	Brazil	2:04.51	

=== A Final ===
The A final was held on 12 August from 17:30.

Rank	Name	Nationality	Time	Notes
1st place, gold medalist(s)	Ryan Murphy	United States	1:53.57	CR
2nd place, silver medalist(s)	Ryosuke Irie	Japan	1:55.12	
3rd place, bronze medalist(s)	Austin Katz	United States	1:56.00	
4	Mitch Larkin	Australia	1:56.02	
5	Keita Sunama	Japan	1:57.03	
6	Bradley Woodward	Australia	1:58.00	
7	Javier Acevedo	Canada	1:58.36	
8	Leonardo de Deus	Brazil	2:01.56	
