= 2018 Pan Pacific Swimming Championships – Men's 100 metre backstroke =

Men's 100 metre backstroke at the 2018 Pan Pacific Swimming Championships
- Venue: Tokyo Tatsumi International Swimming Center
- Dates: 10 August (heats & finals)
- Competitors: 18 from 8 nations
- Winning time: 51.94

Medalists
gold medal	Ryan Murphy	United States
silver medal	Ryosuke Irie	Japan
bronze medal	Mitch Larkin	Australia

The men's 100 metre backstroke competition at the 2018 Pan Pacific Swimming Championships took place on August 10 at the Tokyo Tatsumi International Swimming Center. The defending champion was Ryosuke Irie of Japan.

== Records ==
Prior to this competition, the existing world and Pan Pacific records were as follows:

World record	Ryan Murphy (USA)	51.85	Rio de Janeiro, Brazil	13 August 2016
Pan Pacific Championships record	Matt Grevers (USA)	52.91	Gold Coast, Australia	21 August 2014

== Results ==
All times are in minutes and seconds.

KEY:	QA	Qualified A Final	QB	Qualified B Final	CR	Championships record	NR	National record	PB	Personal best	SB	Seasonal best

=== Heats ===
The first round was held on 10 August from 10:00.

Only two swimmers from each country may advance to the A or B final. If a country not qualify any swimmer to the A final, that same country may qualify up to three swimmers to the B final.

Rank	Name	Nationality	Time	Notes
1	Ryan Murphy	United States	52.19	QA, CR
2	Matthew Grevers	United States	53.27	QA
3	Ryosuke Irie	Japan	53.68	QA
4	Michael Andrew	United States	53.69	QB
4	Justin Ress	United States	53.69	QB
6	Mitch Larkin	Australia	53.73	QA
7	Markus Thormeyer	Canada	53.88	QA
8	Jacob Pebley	United States	53.96	
9	Javier Acevedo	Canada	54.13	QA
10	Austin Katz	United States	54.17	
11	Masaki Kaneko	Japan	54.27	QA
12	Bradley Woodward	Australia	54.36	QA
13	Gabriel Fantoni	Brazil	54.40	QB
14	Wang Yutian	China	56.06	QB
15	Shunichi Nakao	Japan	56.12	QB
16	Josiah Binnema	Canada	56.53	~~QB~~, WD
17	Armand Chan	Philippines	1:02.98	QB
18	Noel Keane	Palau	1:06.71	QB, NR

=== B Final ===
The B final was held on 10 August from 18:00.

Rank	Name	Nationality	Time	Notes
9	Michael Andrew	United States	53.55	
10	Justin Ress	United States	53.59	
11	Gabriel Fantoni	Brazil	53.92	
12	Shunichi Nakao	Japan	55.77	
13	Wang Yutian	China	55.83	
14	Armand Chan	Philippines	1:02.18	
15	Noel Keane	Palau	1:06.49	NR

=== A Final ===
The A final was held on 10 August from 18:00.

Rank	Name	Nationality	Time	Notes
1st place, gold medalist(s)	Ryan Murphy	United States	51.94	CR
2nd place, silver medalist(s)	Ryosuke Irie	Japan	52.78	
3rd place, bronze medalist(s)	Mitch Larkin	Australia	52.88	
4	Matthew Grevers	United States	52.99	
5	Javier Acevedo	Canada	53.90	
6	Markus Thormeyer	Canada	54.02	
7	Masaki Kaneko	Japan	54.33	
8	Bradley Woodward	Australia	54.34	
