= Ryan Murphy (swimmer) =

American swimmer (born 1995)

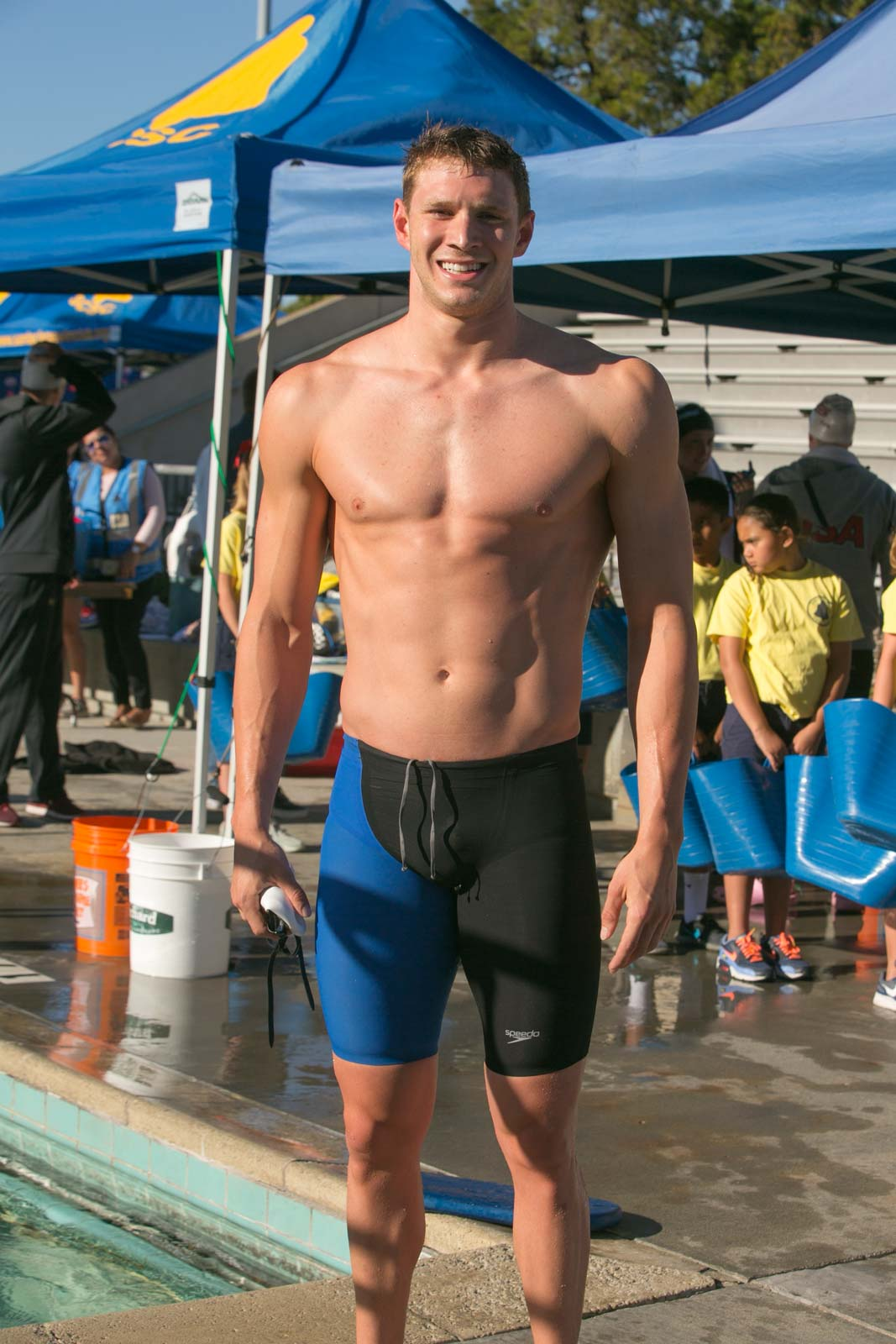
- Murphy in 2018

Personal information
- Full name: Ryan Fitzgerald Murphy
- Nicknames: "Murph", "Murph Man"
- National team: United States
- Born: July 2, 1995 (age 31) Chicago, Illinois, U.S.
- Home town: Jacksonville, Florida, U.S.
- Height: 6 ft 3 in (191 cm)
- Weight: 201 lb (91 kg)
- Spouse: Bridget Konttinen

Sport
- Sport: Swimming
- Strokes: Backstroke, freestyle
- Club: Bolles School Bulldogs, Jacksonville, Florida
- College team: University of California, Berkeley
- Coach: Dave Durden (Berkeley)
Medal record
Men's swimming
Representing the United States
Event	1st	2nd	3rd
Olympic Games	5	2	2
World Championships (LC)	7	8	2
World Championships (SC)	9	4	1
Pan Pacific Championships	3	0	1
Pan American Games	0	0	1
Total	24	14	7
Olympic Games
Gold medal – first place	2016 Rio de Janeiro	100 m backstroke
Gold medal – first place	2016 Rio de Janeiro	200 m backstroke
Gold medal – first place	2016 Rio de Janeiro	4×100 m medley
Gold medal – first place	2020 Tokyo	4×100 m medley
Gold medal – first place	2024 Paris	4×100 m mixed medley
Silver medal – second place	2020 Tokyo	200 m backstroke
Silver medal – second place	2024 Paris	4x100 m medley
Bronze medal – third place	2020 Tokyo	100 m backstroke
Bronze medal – third place	2024 Paris	100 m backstroke
World Championships (LC)
Gold medal – first place	2015 Kazan	4×100 m medley
Gold medal – first place	2017 Budapest	4×100 m medley
Gold medal – first place	2017 Budapest	4×100 m mixed medley
Gold medal – first place	2022 Budapest	200 m backstroke
Gold medal – first place	2022 Budapest	4×100 m mixed medley
Gold medal – first place	2023 Fukuoka	100 m backstroke
Gold medal – first place	2023 Fukuoka	4x100 m medley
Silver medal – second place	2015 Kazan	4×100 m mixed medley
Silver medal – second place	2017 Budapest	200 m backstroke
Silver medal – second place	2019 Gwangju	200 m backstroke
Silver medal – second place	2019 Gwangju	4×100 m medley
Silver medal – second place	2019 Gwangju	4×100 m mixed medley
Silver medal – second place	2022 Budapest	100 m backstroke
Silver medal – second place	2022 Budapest	4×100 m medley
Silver medal – second place	2023 Fukuoka	200 m backstroke
Bronze medal – third place	2017 Budapest	100 m backstroke
Bronze medal – third place	2023 Fukuoka	4×100 m mixed medley
World Championships (SC)
Gold medal – first place	2012 Istanbul	4×100 m medley
Gold medal – first place	2018 Hangzhou	100 m backstroke
Gold medal – first place	2018 Hangzhou	4×100 m medley
Gold medal – first place	2018 Hangzhou	4×50 m mixed medley
Gold medal – first place	2022 Melbourne	50 m backstroke
Gold medal – first place	2022 Melbourne	100 m backstroke
Gold medal – first place	2022 Melbourne	200 m backstroke
Gold medal – first place	2022 Melbourne	4×100 m medley
Gold medal – first place	2022 Melbourne	4×50 m mixed medley
Silver medal – second place	2018 Hangzhou	50 m backstroke
Silver medal – second place	2018 Hangzhou	200 m backstroke
Silver medal – second place	2018 Hangzhou	4×50 m medley
Silver medal – second place	2022 Melbourne	4×50 m medley
Bronze medal – third place	2012 Istanbul	200 m backstroke
Pan Pacific Championships
Gold medal – first place	2018 Tokyo	100 m backstroke
Gold medal – first place	2018 Tokyo	200 m backstroke
Gold medal – first place	2018 Tokyo	4×100 m medley
Bronze medal – third place	2014 Gold Coast	100 m backstroke
Pan American Games
Bronze medal – third place	2011 Guadalajara	200 m backstroke
World Junior Championships
Bronze medal – third place	2011 Lima	200 m backstroke

Olympics official video: Murphy wins 100m backstroke in Olympic record time

Ryan Fitzgerald Murphy (born July 2, 1995) is an American competitive swimmer specializing in backstroke. He is a five-time Olympic gold medalist and the former world-record holder in the men's 100-meter backstroke.

At the 2016 Summer Olympics, Murphy swept the backstroke events, winning gold medals in both the 100- and 200-meter backstroke races. He also won a gold medal in the 4×100-meter medley relay with Michael Phelps, Nathan Adrian, and Cody Miller, and Murphy's backstroke relay leg broke the world record previously set by Aaron Peirsol in 2009.

At the 2020 Summer Olympics, Murphy won a gold medal and set the world record in the 4x100-meter medley relay with Michael Andrew, Caeleb Dressel, and Zach Apple, in addition to a silver medal in the 200-meter backstroke and bronze medal in the 100-meter backstroke.

== Early life and education ==
Murphy began dreaming of competing at the Olympic Games when he was seven years old.

Murphy graduated from Bolles School in Jacksonville, Florida in 2013 and attended the University of California, Berkeley where he competed in swimming under Head Coach Dave Durden. While competing for the California Golden Bears (Cal), he was an eight-time NCAA individual national champion, winning the 100-yard and 200-yard backstrokes in 2014, 2015, 2016, and 2017.

== Swimming career ==
=== 2011 ===
At the age of 16, Murphy earned his first career international medals, both in the 200-meter backstroke. At the 2011 World Junior Swimming Championships in Lima, Murphy won a bronze medal in the 200-meter backstroke with a time of 1:59.63. Later in 2011, at the 2011 Pan American Games, Murphy won another bronze also in the 200-meter backstroke. In the final, he recorded a time of 1:58.50.

=== 2012 ===
2012 World Short Course Championships
Gold medal – first place	4x100 m medley relay	3:21.03
Bronze medal – third place	200 m backstroke	1:48.86

At the 2012 United States Olympic Trials, Murphy missed the Olympic team, finishing sixth in the 100-meter backstroke (53.92) and fourth in the 200-meter backstroke (1:57.39).

Following the Olympics, Murphy competed at the 2012 World Short Course Championships in Istanbul. He won a bronze medal in the 200-meter backstroke with a time of 1:48.86, finishing behind Radosław Kawęcki and Ryan Lochte. Murphy earned a gold medal in the 4×100-meter medley relay for his participation in the heats, swimming the backstroke leg with a time of 50.91.

=== 2013 ===
At the 2013 US National Championships, Murphy just missed qualifying for the 2013 World Aquatics Championships, finishing third in the 100- and 200-meter backstroke with times of 53.38 and 1:56.37, respectively.

=== 2014 ===
Murphy won the 100- and 200-yard backstrokes at his first NCAA D1 Swimming Championships. His 100-yard backstroke time of 44.78 was a US 17–18 National Age Group (NAG) record, and his 200-yard backstroke time of 1:37.23 broke both Tyler Clary's NCAA record and the 17–18 NAG record. He also placed eighth in the 200-yard IM and swam on Cal's 200 and 400 medley and freestyle relays en route to Cal winning the team championship.

=== 2015 ===
At the 2015 NCAA Championships, Murphy swept the backstroke events. He broke the American record previously held by Ryan Lochte in the 200-yard backstroke. He also won the 100-yard backstroke, breaking Lochte's NCAA record. Murphy also placed fifth in the 200 individual medley (IM) and was named CSCAA Swimmer of the Meet.

=== 2016 ===
==== NCAA Championships ====
At the 2016 NCAA D1 Swimming Championships, Murphy continued his backstroke winning streak with first-place finishes the 100- and 200-yard backstrokes in record times. His times of 43.49 and 1:35.73, respectively broke his own NCAA, American, and US Open records. He also placed third in the 200-yard IM in 1:40.27 and was once again was named CSCAA Swimmer of the Meet, this time sharing the title with former Bolles teammates Joseph Schooling and Caeleb Dressel.

==== US Summer Olympic Trials ====
At the 2016 United States Olympic Trials in Omaha, Nebraska, Murphy made his first Olympic team by placing first in the 100- and 200-meter backstroke events. He also made the 4×100 medley relay by virtue of his win in the 100-meter backstroke.

==== 2016 Rio Summer Olympics ====
2016 Summer Olympics
Gold medal – first place	100 m backstroke	51.97 (OR)
Gold medal – first place	200 m backstroke	1.53.62
Gold medal – first place	4×100 m medley	3:27.95 (OR)

At the 2016 Summer Olympics in Rio de Janeiro, Murphy won gold medals in the 100- and 200-meter backstroke, as well as in the 4×100-meter medley relay together with Cody Miller, Michael Phelps, and Nathan Adrian. Murphy broke Aaron Peirsol's world record for the 100-meter backstroke with his relay split time of 51.85, and the relay team as a whole set a new Olympic record with a time of 3:27.95. Murphy's win in the 100-meter backstroke, with a time of 51.97 seconds, set a new Olympic record for the event. It also marked the sixth consecutive time a swimmer representing the United States had won the gold medal in the 100-meter backstroke at the Olympic Games. His gold medal was also the first won by a male alumnus of a high school in Jacksonville, Florida for the United States in an individual swimming event. In total, at his first Olympic Games, Murphy raced and won gold medals in all three of his events, set three Olympic records and one world record, and was named as one of the stars of the 2016 Summer Olympics by the International Olympic Committee.

=== 2017 ===
==== NCAA Championships ====
At the 2017 NCAA championships, Murphy completed his four-for-four sweep of the 100- and 200-yard backstroke events, becoming only the fourth man in NCAA history to sweep 100- and 200-yard events of a single stroke four years in a row after John Nabor (backstroke), Pablo Morales (butterfly), and Brendan Hansen (breaststroke). Murphy also placed third in the 200-yard IM, leading after the breaststroke leg but overtaken in freestyle.

==== World Championships ====
2017 World Championships
Gold medal – first place	400 m medley relay	3:29.66
Gold medal – first place	400 m mixed medley relay	3:40.28 (WR, CR)
Silver medal – second place	200 m backstroke	1:54.21
Bronze medal – third place	100 m backstroke	52.59

At the 2017 US National Championships, the qualifying meet for the 2017 World Aquatics Championships, Murphy won the 200-meter backstroke and placed second to Matt Grevers in the 100-meter backstroke to qualify for the World Championships later that year.

At the 2017 World Swimming Championships in Budapest, Murphy placed third in the 100-meter backstroke behind Xu Jiayu and Grevers and second in the 200-meter backstroke behind Evgeny Rylov and ahead of countryman and former college teammate Jacob Pebley. Murphy also earned gold medals by swimming in the prelims on the 4×100-meter medley and mixed medley relays. The mixed medley relay set a World and Championship record time of 3:40.28 in the prelims, a record later broken by in the US team in finals.

=== 2018 ===
==== 2018 Pan Pacific Championships ====
2018 Pan Pacific Championships
Gold medal – first place	100 m backstroke	51.94 (CR)
Gold medal – first place	200 m backstroke	1:53.57 (CR)
Gold medal – first place	4x100 m medley relay	3:30.20

During the 2018 Pan Pacific Swimming Championships in August 2018 in Tokyo, Japan, Murphy won three gold medals: one in the 100-meter backstroke, one in the 200-meter backstroke, and one in the 4x100-meter medley relay. Murphy's strong finish to the Championships, winning two gold medals on the final day of competition, was noted by Jacksonville newspaper The Florida Times-Union. His gold medal performance in the 200-meter backstroke with a time of 1:53.57 established a new Championships record that was over 1.5 seconds faster than the silver medalist in the event, Ryosuke Irie. Murphy opened up to Reuters after his success at the Championships, expressing he hoped that swimming in a pool close to where swimming competitions for the 2020 Summer Olympics would be held would help quell his superstitions concerning his performance at the upcoming Olympic Games.

USA Swimming took notice of Murphy's swims at the 2018 Pan Pacific Championships and nominated him for the "Relay Performance of the Year", "Male Race of the Year", and "Male Athlete of the Year" Golden Goggle Awards. In total, he won all three awards for which he received nominations.

==== 2018 World Short Course Championships ====
Murphy competed at the 2018 FINA World Swimming Championships in Hangzhou, China in December 2018. He won medals in three individual events: gold in the 100-meter backstroke, silver in the 50-meter backstroke, and silver in the 200-meter backstroke. He also medaled in three relay events: gold in the men's 4×100-meter medley relay, gold in the mixed 4×50-meter medley relay, and silver in the men's 4×50-meter medley relay.

=== 2019 ===
==== 2019 World Aquatics Championships ====
2019 World Championships
Silver medal – second place	200 m backstroke	1:54.12
Silver medal – second place	4x100 m medley relay	3:28.45
Silver medal – second place	4x100 m mixed medley relay	3:39.10

In July 2019 at the 2019 World Aquatics Championships in Gwangju, South Korea, Murphy won three medals. Swimming with Lilly King, Caeleb Dressel, and Simone Manuel in the final of the mixed 4×100-meter medley relay, he won a silver medal. The relay finished two hundredths of a second behind Australia. Murphy also won the silver medal in the 200-meter backstroke and the men's 4×100-meter medley relay.

=== 2021 ===
==== 2020 US Olympic Trials ====
In June 2021, Murphy qualified for the 2020 Olympic Games in Tokyo in the 100-meter backstroke at the 2020 USA Swimming Olympic Trials. He won the event at the US Olympic Trials, swimming a time of 52.33 at the final on June 15. He was the only veteran to qualify in the event for the 2020 Olympics; the other qualifier in the event, Hunter Armstrong, was a first-time member of the US Olympic Team. In the morning prelims of the 200-meter backstroke, Murphy placed fifth with a time of 1:57.95 and advanced to the semifinals. In the evening, Murphy swam a time of 1:55.60 and advanced to the finals in first-place overall. He swam a time of 1:54.20 in the final, winning the event and securing a spot at the 2020 Summer Olympics in the 200-meter backstroke.

==== 2020 Summer Olympics ====
2020 Summer Olympics
Gold medal – first place	4x100 m medley relay	3:26.78 (WR)
Silver medal – second place	200 m backstroke	1:54.15
Bronze medal – third place	100 m backstroke	52.19

Murphy was selected as one of four captains for the US Olympic swim team at the 2020 Summer Olympics along with Caeleb Dressel, Simone Manuel, and Allison Schmitt. All four swimmers were veteran Olympians chosen to provide guidance for their fellow members of the US Olympic Swim Team, with Murphy highlighted for his calm demeanor and the stability he provided the team in a competitive context.

On day two of Olympic competition, in the prelims of the 100-meter backstroke, Murphy swam a 53.22 and tied in overall ranking for seventh with Russian Evgeny Rylov. In the semifinals the following day, Murphy swam the fastest in both semifinals heats with a time of 52.24 and advanced to the final. In the final, Murphy raced against a field of majority veteran Olympians, with five of the eight competitors, including himself, having competed in the final of the 100-meter backstroke at the 2016 Olympic Games. His time of 52.19 seconds won him the bronze medal. Speaking to national newspaper USA Today about winning the bronze medal after winning the gold medal in 2016, Murphy said, "Winning an Olympic gold means you're the best in the world. Being third in the world is no slouch."

On the fifth day of competition, Murphy advanced to the semifinals in the 200-meter backstroke with a time of 1:56.92, seventh overall in the prelims. In the semifinals, Murphy swam over one second faster than in the prelims with a time of 1:55.38 and qualified for the final in third place. Murphy won his second medal of the 2020 Olympics, a silver medal, in the final of the 200-meter backstroke with a time of 1:54.15 on day seven of competition.

In the final of the 4×100-meter mixed medley relay, Murphy swam the backstroke leg of the relay, Lydia Jacoby the breaststroke, Torri Huske the butterfly, and Caeleb Dressel the freestyle leg of the relay; they placed fifth. It was the first time the event was included in the Olympic program for swimming. Murphy held off the field in his leg of the relay, tying Thomas Ceccon of Italy for first at the wall. The American team fell to eighth place by the end of the butterfly leg of the relay but made up some time on the freestyle leg to place fifth overall. Jacoby's goggles had fallen off during her leg of the relay, to which Murphy responded, "Anyone that's swam with their goggles in their mouth like she did, she did fantastic."

On the final day, Murphy swam backstroke in the final of the 4×100-meter medley relay with teammates Michael Andrew (breaststroke), Caeleb Dressel (butterfly), and Zach Apple (freestyle). The relay won the gold medal in a world record time of 3:26.78, setting a new Olympic record in the process. By the end of the 2020 Olympics, Murphy had won a total of six Olympic medals, four in individual events and two in relay events, between his first (2016) and second (2020) Olympic Games. His contribution to the world record and gold medal in the final of the 4×100-meter medley relay earned him a nomination from the USA Swimming Foundation for the Golden Goggle Award for Relay Performance of the Year along with his finals relay teammates. Additionally, Murphy's support of his teammates and the integrity of swimming as a sport, as well as his consistent performances since the 2016 Summer Olympics, earned him a nomination for the Male Athlete of the Year Golden Goggle Award.

His swims in 2021 through the end of August secured his place on the 2021–2022 US National Team in the 100-meter backstroke and 200-meter backstroke events.

==== International Swimming League ====
For the 2021 season of the International Swimming League (ISL), Murphy was retained by the LA Current. He took a break from competition during the regular season of competition and remained on the roster heading into playoffs season. For his first race after the 2020 Olympic Games, Murphy swam a 1:48.43 in the 200-meter backstroke in the playoffs match number two, which was the fastest time in the 2021 year up to that point in time. For the second match of the playoffs, match thirteen overall, Murphy won enough points from his races to earn the most valuable player (MVP) of the match honor. In his second match of the playoffs season, match fifteen overall, Murphy ranked second overall in terms of MVP points, just 4.0 points behind Duncan Scott of London Roar, who was named match MVP. Starting off his third and final playoffs match of the season, Murphy won 19.0 points for his team in one race, winning the 200-meter backstroke in a personal season-best time of 1:48.10. Later the same day, in the 50-meter backstroke, Murphy won the event and set new Americas, American, and ISL records with a time of 22.53 seconds, surpassing the previous records in the event that he himself had set in the 2020 ISL season at 22.54 seconds. The second and final day of the match, Murphy won the 50-meter backstroke skins event, outscoring his competitors and winning in the final head-to-head race against Evgeny Rylov of Energy Standard with a time of 24.22 seconds. Murphy's performances earned him the number two spot for "The Week That Was" from Swimming World for the week of November 29. For the MVP points he had earned since the beginning of the ISL to the end of the 2021 season, Murphy ranked eighth overall with 610 points across thirteen matches.

==== 2022 ====
On day two of the 2022 US International Team Trials in Greensboro, North Carolina, Murphy qualified for the final of the 200-meter backstroke, ranking third in the prelim heats with a time of 1:57.46 and winning the final, qualifying for the 2022 World Aquatics Championships team with a time of 1:55.01. He swam a time of 24.57 in the final of the 50-meter backstroke and placed fourth. In the final of the 100-meter backstroke, Murphy placed second behind Hunter Armstrong with a time of 52.46 seconds, also qualifying for the World Championships team in the event. In October, he was named to the roster for the 2022 World Short Course Championships in the 100-meter backstroke and 200-meter backstroke.

2024

Murphy placed first in the US Olympic Trials in the 200 M backstroke, becoming the first swimmer to win both the 200 and 100 events three years in a row. In Paris, he won bronze in the 100 M backstroke, silver in the 4 x 100 Medley, and gold in the mixed 4 x 100 medley.

== International championships ==
Meet	50 backstroke	100 backstroke	200 backstroke	4×50 medley	4×100 medley	4×50 mixed medley	4×100 mixed medley
WJC 2011			3rd place, bronze medalist(s)	—N/a		—N/a	—N/a
PAN 2011	—N/a		3rd place, bronze medalist(s)	—N/a		—N/a	—N/a
SCW 2012			3rd place, bronze medalist(s)	—N/a	(gold) ^{[a]}	—N/a	—N/a
PAC 2014	—N/a	3rd place, bronze medalist(s)	4th	—N/a		—N/a	—N/a
WC 2015			5th	—N/a	1st place, gold medalist(s)	—N/a	2nd place, silver medalist(s)
OG 2016	—N/a	1st place, gold medalist(s)	1st place, gold medalist(s)	—N/a	1st place, gold medalist(s)	—N/a	—N/a
WC 2017		3rd place, bronze medalist(s)	2nd place, silver medalist(s)	—N/a	(gold) ^{[a]}	—N/a	(gold) ^{[a]}
PAC 2018	—N/a	1st place, gold medalist(s)	1st place, gold medalist(s)	—N/a	1st place, gold medalist(s)	—N/a	
SCW 2018	2nd place, silver medalist(s)	1st place, gold medalist(s)	2nd place, silver medalist(s)	2nd place, silver medalist(s)	1st place, gold medalist(s)	1st place, gold medalist(s)	—N/a
WC 2019	4th	4th	2nd place, silver medalist(s)	—N/a	2nd place, silver medalist(s)	—N/a	2nd place, silver medalist(s)
OG 2020	—N/a	3rd place, bronze medalist(s)	2nd place, silver medalist(s)	—N/a	1st place, gold medalist(s)	—N/a	5th
WC 2022		2nd place, silver medalist(s)	1st place, gold medalist(s)	—N/a	2nd place, silver medalist(s)	—N/a	(gold) ^{[a]}
WC 2023		1st place, gold medalist(s)	2nd place, silver medalist(s)	—N/a	1st place, gold medalist(s)	—N/a	3rd place, bronze medalist(s)
OG 2024		3rd place, bronze medalist(s)	10th		2nd place, silver medalist(s)		1st place, gold medalist(s)

^{a} Murphy swam only in the prelims heats.

== Personal best times ==
As of June 21, 2024

Long Course
Event	Time	Meet	Date	Note(s)
50 m freestyle	23.77	TYR Pro Swim Series – Des Moines	March 5, 2020	
100 m freestyle	48.88	2017 US National Championships	June 27, 2017	
200 m freestyle	1:49.57	2018 California Speedo Grand Challenge	May 25, 2018	
50 m backstroke	24.24	2018 US National Championships	July 27, 2018	Former AM, NR
100 m backstroke	51.85	2016 Summer Olympics	August 13, 2016	AM, NR, Former WR
200 m backstroke	1:53.57	2018 Pan Pacific Swimming Championships	August 11, 2018	
100 m butterfly	51.35	2023 US National Championships	June 29, 2023	

Legend: WR – World record; AM – Americas record; e – equalled existing record; NR – American record;
Records not set in finals: h – heat; sf – semifinal; r – relay 1st leg; rh – relay heat 1st leg; b – B final; † – en route to final mark; so – swim-off; tt – time trial

Short Course Meters
Event	Time	Meet	Date	Note(s)
50 m backstroke	22.53	2021 International Swimming League	November 25, 2021	AM, NR
100 m backstroke	48.50	2022 World Short Course Championships	December 14, 2022	
200 m backstroke	1:47.34	2018 World Short Course Championships	December 16, 2018	
50 m butterfly	22.65	2020 International Swimming League	November 22, 2020	

Legend: AM – Americas record; e – equalled existing record; NR – American record;
Records not set in finals: h – heat; sf – semifinal; r – relay 1st leg; rh – relay heat 1st leg; b – B final; † – en route to final mark; so – swim-off; tt – time trial

Short Course Yards
Event	Time	Meet	Date	Note(s)
100 y backstroke	43.49	2016 NCAA Championships	March 25, 2016	Former NCAA, American, US Open records
200 y backstroke	1:35.73	2016 NCAA Championships	March 26, 2016	NCAA, American, US Open records

== World records ==
Long course meters (50 m pool)
Event	Time		Meet	Date	Location	Age	Status	Ref
100 m backstroke	51.85	r	2016 Summer Olympics	August 13, 2016	Rio de Janeiro, Brazil	21	Former	
4x100 m medley relay^{[a]} (backstroke)	3:26.78 (52.31)		2020 Summer Olympics	August 1, 2021	Tokyo, Japan	26	Current	

Legend: r – relay lead-off leg

^{a} with Michael Andrew (breaststroke), Caeleb Dressel (butterfly), Zach Apple (freestyle)

== Olympic records ==
Event	Time		Olympic Games	Date	Location	Age	Status	Notes	Ref
100 m backstroke	51.97		2016 Summer Olympics	August 8, 2016	Rio de Janeiro, Brazil	21	Former		
100 m backstroke (2)	51.85	r	2016 Summer Olympics	August 13, 2016	Rio de Janeiro, Brazil	21	Current	Former WR	
4x100 m medley relay^{[a]}	3:27.95		2016 Summer Olympics	August 13, 2016	Rio de Janeiro, Brazil	21	Former		
4x100 m medley relay^{[b]} (2)	3:26.78		2020 Summer Olympics	August 1, 2021	Tokyo, Japan	26	Current	also a WR	

Legend: WR – World record; r – relay lead-off leg

^{a} split 51.85 in backstroke; with Cody Miller (breaststroke), Michael Phelps (butterfly), Nathan Adrian (freestyle)
^{b} split 52.31 in backstroke; with Michael Andrew (breaststroke), Caeleb Dressel (butterfly), Zach Apple (freestyle)

== Awards and honors ==
- International Swimming League, Match Most Valuable Player: 2021 Match 13
- Swimming World, The Week That Was: November 29, 2021 (#2)
- Golden Goggle Award, Male Athlete of the Year: 2018
- Golden Goggle Award, Relay Performance of the Year: 2018 (4x100-meter medley relay), 2021 (4x100-meter medley relay)
- Golden Goggle Award, Male Race of the Year: 2018 (100-meter backstroke)
- SwimSwam Top 100 (Men's): 2021 (#7), 2022 (#9)
- SwimSwam Swammy Award, U.S. Swimmer of the Year (male): 2018
- SwimSwam Swammy Award, NCAA Swimmer of the Year (male): 2014, 2016
- Pac-12 Conference, Scholar-Athlete of the Year (Men's Swimming & Diving): 2016—2017
- Pac-12 Conference, Swimmer of the Year: 2015, 2016, 2017
- Pac-12 Conference, Freshman/Newcomer of the Year: 2014
- Golden Goggle Award nominee, Breakout Performer of the Year: 2014
- Golden Goggle Award nominee, Male Athlete of the Year: 2021

== Personal life ==
Murphy began dating Bridget Konttinen whom he met in college, in 2016. The couple announced their engagement on May 15, 2022.

In an interview with Melvin Stewart of SwimSwam in 2021, Murphy shared that he is approximately 95% Irish by ancestry; his mother is of full Irish descent and his father is approximately 90% Irish by ancestry. Murphy was raised in a strong Catholic family and remains committed to his faith, stating, "I’m a firm believer in God. My faith is important to me. There are, however, times when I rely on him more than others. Overall, I am private in my spirituality."

== See also ==
- List of people from Florida
- List of people from Jacksonville, Florida
- World and Olympic records set at the 2016 Summer Olympics
- World and Olympic records set at the 2020 Summer Olympics
- World record progression 100 metres backstroke
- World record progression 4 × 100 metres medley relay
- List of multiple Olympic gold medalists at a single Games
- List of multiple Olympic gold medalists
- Detailed meet and event results, ranking, and LSC/Team records

Records
Preceded by Aaron Peirsol	Men's 100-meter backstroke world record-holder (long course); August 13, 2016 – June 20, 2022	Succeeded by Thomas Ceccon
Preceded by Aaron Peirsol, Eric Shanteau, Michael Phelps, David Walters	Men's 4×100-meter medley relay world record-holder (long course); August 1, 2021 – present With: Michael Andrew, Caeleb Dressel, Zach Apple	Succeeded by Incumbents
