= Swimming at the 2016 Summer Olympics – Men's 200 metre backstroke =

Men's 200 metre backstroke at the Games of the XXXI Olympiad
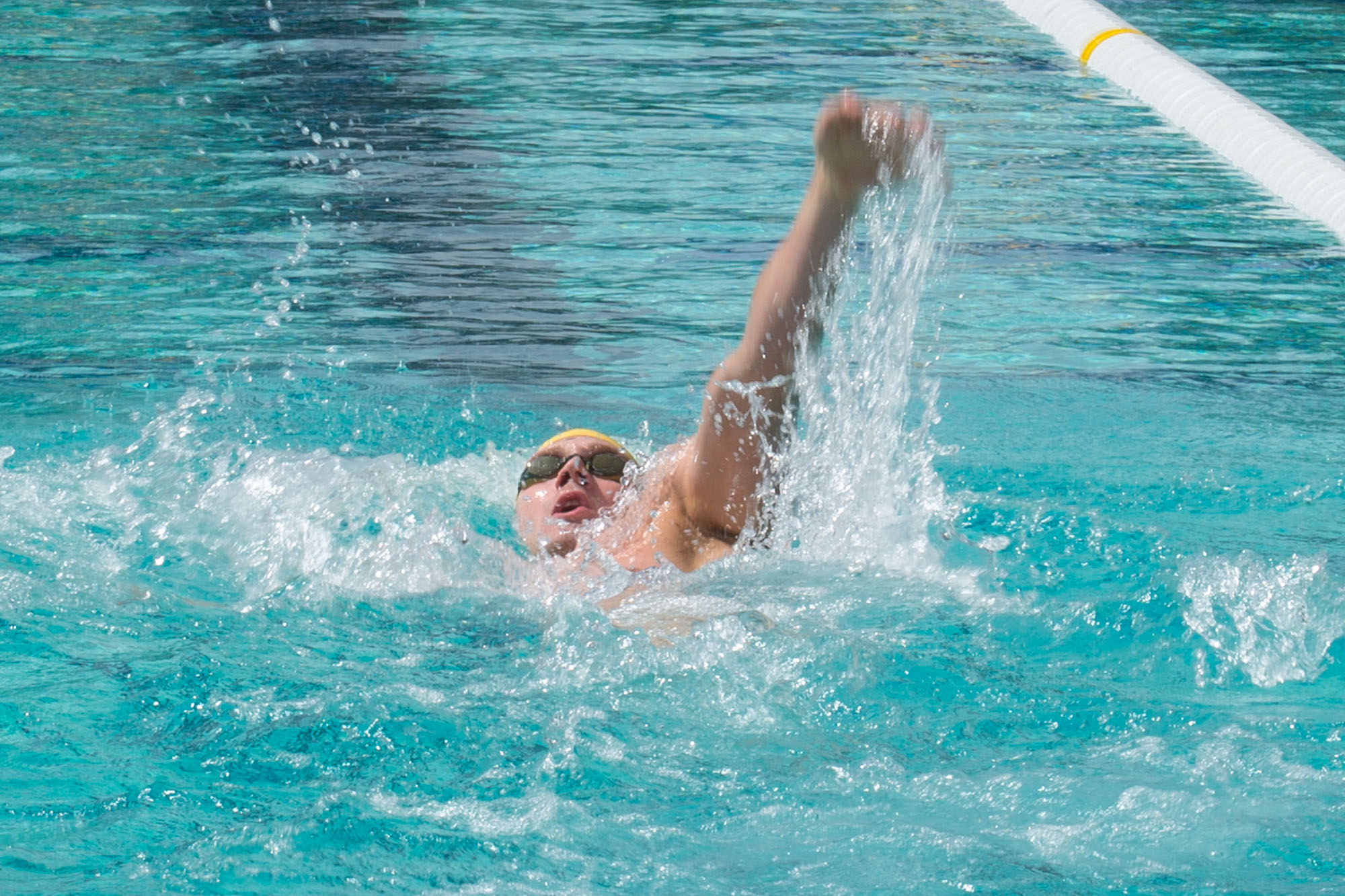
- Gold medalist Ryan Murphy (2017)
- Venue: Olympic Aquatics Stadium
- Dates: 10 August 2016 (heats & semifinals); 11 August 2016 (final)
- Competitors: 26 from 19 nations
- Winning time: 1:53.62

Medalists
1st place, gold medalist(s)		Ryan Murphy	United States
2nd place, silver medalist(s)		Mitch Larkin	Australia
3rd place, bronze medalist(s)		Evgeny Rylov	Russia

The men's 200 metre backstroke event at the 2016 Summer Olympics took place on 10–11 August at the Olympic Aquatics Stadium. There were 26 competitors from 19 nations.

== Summary ==
The American tradition of excellence continued in the distance backstroke, as Ryan Murphy made a historic milestone to claim the country's sixth straight title, and strike a backstroke double for the first time since Aaron Peirsol did so in 2004. He held off a stiff competition from Australia's reigning world champion Mitch Larkin down the home stretch to earn his second individual gold at the Games with a time of 1:53.62. Leading the race early on the initial length, Larkin pulled closer to Murphy about the midway through the final lap, but could not catch him near the wall to finish with a silver-medal time in 1:53.96. Meanwhile, Russia's Evgeny Rylov finished with the bronze in 1:53.97, a hundredth of a second behind Larkin.

Trailing the top three by over a second, China's Xu Jiayu, runner-up to Murphy in the 100 m backstroke on night three, took the fourth spot in 1:55.16, while his teenage teammate Li Guangyuan posted a sixth-place time in 1:55.89. U.S. swimmer Jacob Pebley, who had upset the defending champion Tyler Clary at the Olympic trials one month earlier, split the Chinese duo to finish fifth with a 1:55.52. Germany's Christian Diener (1:56.27), along with double London 2012 medalist Ryosuke Irie of Japan (1:56.36), rounded out the field.

The medals for the competition were presented by Yumilka Ruiz, Cuba, IOC member, and the gifts were presented by Dmitris Diathestopoulos, Member of the FINA Bureau.

== Background ==
This was the 15th appearance of the 200-metre backstroke event. It was first held in 1900. The event did not return until 1964; since then, it has been on the programme at every Summer Games. From 1904 to 1960, a men's 100-metre backstroke was held instead. In 1964, only the 200 metres was held. Beginning in 1968 and ever since, both the 100 and 200 metre versions have been held.

Three of the 8 finalists from the 2012 Games returned: silver medalist Ryosuke Irie of Japan, fourth-place finisher Radosław Kawęcki of Poland, and eighth-place finisher Mitch Larkin of Australia. Larkin, Kawęcki, and Evgeny Rylov of Russia had reached the podium at the 2015 World Championships, with Irie 4th and American Ryan Murphy taking 5th. Larkin was the favourite, though Murphy had a strong showing at the U.S. Olympic trials and had already won the 100-metre backstroke in Rio (defeating Larkin, who finished fourth).

Azerbaijan, Belarus, and the Virgin Islands each made their debut in the event. Australia made its 14th appearance, the most among nations to that point.

== Qualification ==
Each National Olympic Committee (NOC) could enter up to two swimmers if both met the Olympic Qualifying Time (or "OQT"). An NOC with no swimmers meeting the OQT but at least one swimmer meeting the Olympic Selection Time (or "OST") was not guaranteed a place, but was eligible for selection to fill the overall 900 swimmer quota for the Games. For 2016, the OQT was 1:58.22 while the OST was 2:02.36. The qualifying window was 1 March 2015 to 3 July 2016; only approved meets (generally international competitions and national Olympic trials) during that period could be used to meet the standards. There were also universality places available; if no male swimmer from a nation qualified in any event, the NOC could enter one male swimmer in an event.

The two swimmers per NOC limit had been in place since the 1984 Games.

== Competition format ==
The competition followed the format established in 2000, with three rounds: heats, semifinals, and a final. The advancement rule followed the format introduced in 1952. A swimmer's place in the heat was not used to determine advancement; instead, the fastest times from across all heats in a round were used. The top 16 swimmers from the heats advanced to the semifinals. The top 8 semifinalists advanced to the final. Head-to-head swim-offs were used as necessary to break ties.

This swimming event used backstroke. Because an Olympic-size swimming pool is 50 metres long, this race consisted of four lengths of the pool.

== Records ==
Prior to this competition, the existing world and Olympic records were as follows.

World record	Aaron Peirsol (USA)	1:51.92	Rome, Italy	31 July 2009
Olympic record	Tyler Clary (USA)	1:53.41	London, United Kingdom	2 August 2012

No new world or Olympic records were set during the competition.

== Schedule ==
All times are Brasilia Time (UTC-3)

Date	Time	Round
Wednesday, 10 August 2016	13:25; 22:28	Heats; Semifinals
Thursday, 11 August 2016	22:26	Final

== Results ==
=== Heats ===
Rank	Heat	Lane	Swimmer	Nation	Time	Notes
1	2	4	Evgeny Rylov	Russia	1:55.02	Q
2	2	5	Xu Jiayu	China	1:55.51	Q
3	4	4	Mitch Larkin	Australia	1:56.01	Q
4	3	4	Ryan Murphy	United States	1:56.29	Q
5	3	5	Jacob Pebley	United States	1:56.44	Q
6	2	3	Jan-Philip Glania	Germany	1:56.50	Q
6	4	7	Andrey Shabasov	Russia	1:56.50	Q
8	4	3	Ryosuke Irie	Japan	1:56.61	Q
9	2	2	Christian Diener	Germany	1:56.62	Q
10	4	6	Josh Beaver	Australia	1:56.65	Q
11	3	6	Li Guangyuan	China	1:56.85	Q
12	4	1	Leonardo de Deus	Brazil	1:57.00	Q, NR
13	2	6	Masaki Kaneko	Japan	1:57.19	Q
14	3	2	Hugo González	Spain	1:57.50	Q
15	4	8	Corey Main	New Zealand	1:57.51	Q
16	3	3	Yakov Toumarkin	Israel	1:57.58	Q
17	4	5	Radosław Kawęcki	Poland	1:57.61	
18	1	4	Robert Glință	Romania	1:57.91	
19	2	7	Ádám Telegdy	Hungary	1:59.09	
20	1	5	Rexford Tullius	Virgin Islands	1:59.14	
21	4	2	Danas Rapšys	Lithuania	1:59.58	
22	3	1	Dávid Földházi	Hungary	1:59.69	
22	3	8	Omar Pinzón	Colombia	1:59.69	
24	3	7	Apostolos Christou	Greece	1:59.78	
25	2	1	Mikita Tsmyh	Belarus	2:00.96	
26	1	3	Boris Kirillov	Azerbaijan	2:05.01	

=== Semifinals ===
Rank	Heat	Lane	Swimmer	Nation	Time	Notes
1	2	4	Evgeny Rylov	Russia	1:54.45	Q
2	2	5	Mitch Larkin	Australia	1:54.73	Q
3	2	3	Jacob Pebley	United States	1:54.92	Q
4	1	5	Ryan Murphy	United States	1:55.15	Q
5	1	4	Xu Jiayu	China	1:55.66	Q
6	2	7	Li Guangyuan	China	1:55.92	Q
7	1	6	Ryosuke Irie	Japan	1:56.31	Q
8	2	2	Christian Diener	Germany	1:56.37	Q
9	1	3	Jan-Philip Glania	Germany	1:56.53	
10	1	2	Josh Beaver	Australia	1:56.57	
11	2	1	Masaki Kaneko	Japan	1:56.78	
12	2	6	Andrey Shabasov	Russia	1:56.84	
13	1	7	Leonardo de Deus	Brazil	1:57.67	
14	2	8	Corey Main	New Zealand	1:58.08	
15	1	8	Yakov Toumarkin	Israel	1:58.63	
16	1	1	Hugo González	Spain	1:59.08	

=== Final ===
Rank	Lane	Swimmer	Nation	Time	Notes
1st place, gold medalist(s)	6	Ryan Murphy	United States	1:53.62	
2nd place, silver medalist(s)	5	Mitch Larkin	Australia	1:53.96	
3rd place, bronze medalist(s)	4	Evgeny Rylov	Russia	1:53.97	ER
4	2	Xu Jiayu	China	1:55.16	
5	3	Jacob Pebley	United States	1:55.52	
6	7	Li Guangyuan	China	1:55.89	
7	8	Christian Diener	Germany	1:56.27	
8	1	Ryosuke Irie	Japan	1:56.36	
