= 2016 FINA World Swimming Championships (25 m) – Men's 200 metre backstroke =

Men's 200 metre backstroke at the 2016 FINA World Swimming Championships (25 m)
- Venue: WFCU Centre
- Dates: 11 December (heats and final)
- Competitors: 54 from 43 nations
- Winning time: 1:47.63

Medalists
| gold medal | Radosław Kawęcki | Poland |
| silver medal | Jacob Pebley | United States |
| bronze medal | Masaki Kaneko | Japan |

The Men's 200 metre backstroke competition of the 2016 FINA World Swimming Championships (25 m) was held on 11 December 2016.

== Records ==
Prior to the competition, the existing world and championship records were as follows.

| | Name | Nation | Time | Location | Date |
|---|---|---|---|---|---|
| World record | Mitch Larkin | Australia | 1:45.63 | Sydney | 27 November 2015 |
| Championship record | Ryan Lochte | United States | 1:46.68 | Dubai | 19 December 2010 |

== Results ==
=== Heats ===
The heats were held at 09:37.

| Rank | Heat | Lane | Name | Nationality | Time | Notes |
|---|---|---|---|---|---|---|
| 1 | 4 | 4 | Masaki Kaneko | Japan | 1:50.30 | Q |
| 2 | 5 | 4 | Radosław Kawęcki | Poland | 1:51.00 | Q |
| 3 | 4 | 6 | Jacob Pebley | United States | 1:51.17 | Q |
| 4 | 4 | 5 | Xu Jiayu | China | 1:51.35 | Q |
| 5 | 5 | 5 | Danas Rapšys | Lithuania | 1:51.38 | Q |
| 6 | 6 | 2 | Hayate Matsubara | Japan | 1:51.51 | Q |
| 7 | 6 | 4 | Mitch Larkin | Australia | 1:51.87 | Q |
| 8 | 5 | 6 | Robert Glință | Romania | 1:51.92 | Q, NR |
| 9 | 6 | 7 | Péter Bernek | Hungary | 1:52.05 | |
| 10 | 6 | 9 | Grigoriy Tarasevich | Russia | 1:52.46 | |
| 11 | 6 | 3 | Leonardo de Deus | Brazil | 1:52.59 | |
| 12 | 4 | 7 | Michael Taylor | United States | 1:52.62 | |
| 13 | 5 | 7 | Mikita Tsmyh | Belarus | 1:52.89 | NR |
| 14 | 4 | 3 | Ádám Telegdy | Hungary | 1:52.92 | |
| 15 | 6 | 5 | Andrey Shabasov | Russia | 1:52.93 | |
| 16 | 3 | 9 | Anton Loncar | Croatia | 1:53.35 | |
| 17 | 4 | 0 | Apostolos Christou | Greece | 1:54.15 | NR |
| 18 | 3 | 2 | Max Litchfield | Great Britain | 1:54.29 | |
| 19 | 4 | 2 | Tomáš Franta | Czech Republic | 1:54.97 | |
| 20 | 5 | 2 | Oleg Garasymovytch | France | 1:55.25 | |
| 21 | 5 | 0 | Gabriel Lopes | Portugal | 1:55.63 | |
| 22 | 3 | 7 | Uvis Kalniņš | Latvia | 1:56.07 | NR |
| 23 | 5 | 8 | Ricky Ellis | South Africa | 1:56.32 | |
| 24 | 5 | 3 | David Gamburg | Israel | 1:56.64 | |
| 25 | 4 | 8 | Markus Thormeyer | Canada | 1:57.11 | |
| 26 | 3 | 5 | Trần Duy Khôi | Vietnam | 1:57.35 | NR |
| 27 | 3 | 8 | Charles Hockin | Paraguay | 1:57.45 | |
| 28 | 6 | 8 | Axel Pettersson | Sweden | 1:57.72 | |
| 29 | 2 | 5 | Iskender Baslakov | Turkey | 1:57.77 | |
| 30 | 1 | 8 | Jérémy Desplanches | Switzerland | 1:57.96 | |
| 31 | 3 | 4 | Matías López | Paraguay | 1:58.06 | |
| 32 | 3 | 0 | Yeziel Morales Miranda | Puerto Rico | 1:58.17 | NR |
| 33 | 2 | 3 | Boris Kirillov | Azerbaijan | 1:58.50 | NR |
| 34 | 3 | 6 | João Vital | Portugal | 1:58.53 | |
| 35 | 5 | 1 | Mattias Carlsson | Sweden | 1:59.28 | |
| 36 | 6 | 0 | Gaston Hernandez | Argentina | 1:59.37 | |
| 37 | 2 | 6 | Keanan Dols | Jamaica | 1:59.43 | NR |
| 38 | 5 | 9 | Joan Pons Ramon | Spain | 1:59.44 | |
| 39 | 6 | 1 | Jarryd Baxter | South Africa | 1:59.82 | |
| 40 | 4 | 9 | Kristinn Þórarinsson | Iceland | 2:02.14 | |
| 41 | 2 | 4 | Gorazd Chepishevski | Macedonia | 2:02.35 | NR |
| 42 | 1 | 0 | Fran Krznaric | Croatia | 2:02.58 | |
| 43 | 2 | 8 | Adil Assouab | Morocco | 2:02.79 | NR |
| 44 | 2 | 1 | Jarod Arroyo | Puerto Rico | 2:02.96 | |
| 45 | 2 | 2 | Steven Maina | Kenya | 2:05.60 | NR |
| 46 | 2 | 0 | Eisner Barberena Espinoza | Nicaragua | 2:06.75 | NR |
| 47 | 2 | 9 | Mathieu Marquet | Mauritius | 2:08.72 | |
| 48 | 1 | 4 | Kennet Libohova | Albania | 2:13.44 | NR |
| 49 | 1 | 5 | Heriniavo Rasolonjatovo | Madagascar | 2:14.02 | NR |
| 50 | 1 | 6 | Carlos Vasquez | Honduras | 2:17.66 | NR |
| 51 | 1 | 3 | Gabriel Siwady | Honduras | 2:19.31 | |
| 52 | 1 | 1 | Elijah Cruz | Gibraltar | 2:20.31 | NR |
| 53 | 1 | 7 | Daryl Appleton | Antigua and Barbuda | 2:22.29 | NR |
| 54 | 1 | 2 | Naveed Hussian | Pakistan | 2:25.42 | NR |
| | 2 | 7 | Driss Lahrichi | Morocco | | DNS |
| | 3 | 1 | Francis Fong | Singapore | | DNS |
| | 3 | 3 | Daniil Bukin | Uzbekistan | | DNS |
| | 4 | 1 | Javier Acevedo | Canada | | DNS |
| | 6 | 6 | Bobby Hurley | Australia | | DNS |

=== Final ===
The final was held at 19:24.

| Rank | Lane | Name | Nationality | Time | Notes |
|---|---|---|---|---|---|
| 1st place, gold medalist(s) | 5 | Radosław Kawęcki | Poland | 1:47.63 | |
| 2nd place, silver medalist(s) | 3 | Jacob Pebley | United States | 1:48.98 | |
| 3rd place, bronze medalist(s) | 4 | Masaki Kaneko | Japan | 1:49.18 | |
| 4 | 1 | Mitch Larkin | Australia | 1:49.25 | |
| 5 | 2 | Danas Rapšys | Lithuania | 1:50.87 | NR |
| 6 | 6 | Xu Jiayu | China | 1:51.37 | |
| 7 | 7 | Hayate Matsubara | Japan | 1:52.16 | |
| 8 | 8 | Robert Glință | Romania | 1:52.57 | |
