= Golden Goggle Awards =

Awards ceremony

The Golden Goggle Awards, presented by the USA Swimming Foundation, is an awards ceremony which recognizes and honors the accomplishments of swimmers who represented the United States, that is USA Swimming National Team members, over the last year. The awards were established in 2004 with the first awards ceremony held in November of the same year in New York City. There are eight main categories: Breakout Performer of the Year, Coach of the Year, Perseverance Award, Relay Performance of the Year, Male Race of the Year, Female Race of the Year, Male Athlete of the Year, and Female Athlete of the Year. Nominees in each category are announced in advance of the awards ceremony and recipients of each award are revealed at the ceremony itself. Winners for each award are determined by a selection panel and fan votes. The awards ceremony serves as a fundraiser for the foundation, with seats and tables available for purchase and proceeds going to the foundation and other humanitarian efforts such as aid relief for those affected by Hurricane Katrina. The dress code for attendees is black tie. Localities hosting the annual ceremony vary and include cities such as New York City, Los Angeles, and Miami.

== Ceremony locations ==
- 2004: New York City
- 2005: Hammerstein Ballroom, New York City
- 2006: Beverly Hills, California
- 2007: The Beverly Hilton, Beverly Hills, California
- 2008: New York Hilton, New York City
- 2009: The Beverly Hilton, Beverly Hills, California
- 2010: New York City
- 2011: Los Angeles
- 2012: Marriott Marquis, New York City
- 2013: JW Marriott Los Angeles L.A. LIVE, Los Angeles
- 2014: New York City
- 2015: Los Angeles
- 2016: New York City
- 2017: Los Angeles
- 2018: New York City
- 2019: Los Angeles
- 2020: Virtual
- 2021: Faena Hotel Miami Beach, Miami
- 2022: Marriott Marquis, New York City (host: Ahmed Fareed)
- 2023: Los Angeles, California
- 2024: Indianapolis
- 2025: Denver, Colorado
- 2026: Denver, Colorado

== Awards ==
=== Male Athlete of the Year ===
- 2004: Michael Phelps
- 2005: Aaron Peirsol
- 2006: Brendan Hansen
- 2007: Michael Phelps
- 2008: Michael Phelps
- 2009: Ryan Lochte
- 2010: Ryan Lochte
- 2011: Ryan Lochte
- 2012: Michael Phelps
- 2013: Ryan Lochte
- 2014: Michael Phelps
- 2015: Michael Phelps
- 2016: Michael Phelps
- 2017: Caeleb Dressel
- 2018: Ryan Murphy
- 2019: Caeleb Dressel
- 2020: Not awarded due to the COVID-19 pandemic
- 2021: Caeleb Dressel
- 2022: Bobby Finke
- 2023: Ryan Murphy
- 2024: Bobby Finke
- 2025: Luca Urlando
- 2026: Van Mathias

=== Female Athlete of the Year ===
- 2004: Natalie Coughlin
- 2005: Katie Hoff
- 2006: Katie Hoff
- 2007: Katie Hoff
- 2008: Natalie Coughlin
- 2009: Rebecca Soni
- 2010: Rebecca Soni
- 2011: Missy Franklin
- 2012: Missy Franklin
- 2013: Katie Ledecky
- 2014: Katie Ledecky
- 2015: Katie Ledecky
- 2016: Katie Ledecky
- 2017: Katie Ledecky
- 2018: Katie Ledecky
- 2019: Simone Manuel
- 2020: Not awarded due to the COVID-19 pandemic
- 2021: Katie Ledecky
- 2022: Katie Ledecky
- 2023: Katie Ledecky / Kate Douglass
- 2024: Torri Huske
- 2025: Katie Ledecky
- 2026: Kate Douglass

=== Breakout Performer of the Year ===
- 2004: Larsen Jensen
- 2005: Jessica Hardy
- 2006: Cullen Jones
- 2007: Ben Wildman-Tobriner
- 2008: Rebecca Soni
- 2009: Tyler Clary
- 2010: Missy Franklin
- 2011: Alex Meyer
- 2012: Katie Ledecky
- 2013: Chase Kalisz
- 2014: Maya DiRado
- 2015: Jordan Wilimovsky
- 2016: Lilly King
- 2017: Mallory Comerford
- 2018: Michael Andrew
- 2019: Regan Smith
- 2020: Not awarded due to the COVID-19 pandemic
- 2021: Lydia Jacoby
- 2022: Leah Hayes
- 2023: Jack Alexy
- 2024: Gretchen Walsh
- 2025: Not awarded
- 2026: McKenzie Siroky

=== Coach of the Year ===
- 2004: Bob Bowman
- 2005: Eddie Reese
- 2006: Eddie Reese
- 2007: Bob Bowman
- 2008: Bob Bowman
- 2009: Eddie Reese
- 2010: Gregg Troy
- 2011: Gregg Troy
- 2012: Bob Bowman
- 2013: Bruce Gemmell
- 2014: Bruce Gemmell
- 2015: Bruce Gemmell
- 2016: Dave Durden
- 2017: Greg Meehan
- 2018: Greg Meehan
- 2019: Mike Parratto
- 2020: Not awarded due to the COVID-19 pandemic
- 2021: Gregg Troy
- 2022: Anthony Nesty
- 2023: Dave Durden
- 2024: Todd Desorbo
- 2025: Todd Desorbo
- 2026: Todd Desorbo

=== Relay Performance of the Year ===
- 2004: Women's 4 × 200 meter freestyle relay at Olympic Games (Natalie Coughlin, Carly Piper, Dana Vollmer, Kaitlin Sandeno)
- 2005: Women's 4 × 200 meter freestyle relay at World Championships (Natalie Coughlin, Katie Hoff, Whitney Myers, Kaitlin Sandeno)
- 2006: Men's 4 × 100 meter freestyle relay at Pan Pacific Championships (Michael Phelps, Neil Walker, Cullen Jones, Jason Lezak)
- 2007: Men's 4 × 200 meter freestyle relay at World Championships (Michael Phelps, Ryan Lochte, Klete Keller, Peter Vanderkaay)
- 2008: Men's 4 × 100 meter freestyle relay at Olympic Games (Michael Phelps, Garrett Weber-Gale, Cullen Jones, Jason Lezak)
- 2009: Men's 4 × 100 meter freestyle relay at World Championships (Michael Phelps, Ryan Lochte, Matt Grevers, Nathan Adrian)
- 2010: Women's 4 × 100 meter medley relay at Pan Pacific Championships (Natalie Coughlin, Rebecca Soni, Dana Vollmer, Jessica Hardy)
- 2011: Women's 4 × 100 meter medley relay at World Championships (Natalie Coughlin, Rebecca Soni, Dana Vollmer, Missy Franklin)
- 2012: Women's 4 × 100 meter medley relay at Olympic Games (Missy Franklin, Rebecca Soni, Dana Vollmer, Allison Schmitt)
- 2013: Women's 4 × 100 meter freestyle relay at World Championships (Missy Franklin, Natalie Coughlin, Shannon Vreeland, Megan Romano)
- 2014: Women's 4 × 200 meter freestyle relay at Pan Pacific Swimming Championships (Shannon Vreeland, Missy Franklin, Leah Smith, Katie Ledecky)
- 2015: Women's 4 × 200 meter freestyle relay at World Championships (Missy Franklin, Leah Smith, Katie McLaughlin, Katie Ledecky)
- 2016: Men's 4 × 100 meter freestyle relay at Olympic Games (Caeleb Dressel, Michael Phelps, Ryan Held, Nathan Adrian)
- 2017: Women's 4 x 100 meter medley relay at World Championships (Kathleen Baker, Lilly King, Kelsi Worrell, Simone Manuel)
- 2018: Men's 4 × 100 meter medley relay at Pan Pacific Swimming Championships (Ryan Murphy, Andrew Wilson, Caeleb Dressel, Nathan Adrian)
- 2019: Women's 4 x 100 meter medley relay at World Championships (Regan Smith, Lilly King, Kelsi Dahlia, Simone Manuel)
- 2020: Not awarded due to the COVID-19 pandemic
- 2021: Men's 4 × 100 metre medley relay at Olympic Games (Ryan Murphy, Michael Andrew, Caeleb Dressel, Zach Apple)
- 2022: Women's 4 × 200 metre freestyle relay at World Championships (Claire Weinstein, Leah Smith, Katie Ledecky, Bella Sims)
- 2023: Women's 4 × 100 metre medley relay at World Championships (Regan Smith, Lilly King, Gretchen Walsh, Kate Douglass)
- 2024: Women's 4 × 100 metre medley relay at Olympic Games (Regan Smith, Lilly King, Gretchen Walsh, Torri Huske)
- 2025: Women's 4 × 100 metre medley relay at World Championships (Regan Smith, Kate Douglass, Gretchen Walsh, Torri Huske)
- 2026: Mixed 4 × 100 metre medley relay at Pan Pacific Swimming Championships (Will Modglin, Van Mathias, Gretchen Walsh, Kate Douglass)

=== Male Race of the Year ===
- 2004: Michael Phelps for 100 meter butterfly at Olympic Games
- 2005: Ian Crocker for 100 meter butterfly at World Championships
- 2006: Michael Phelps for 200 meter individual medley at Pan Pacific Championships
- 2007: Michael Phelps for 200 meter butterfly at World Championships
- 2008: Michael Phelps for 100 meter butterfly at Olympic Games
- 2009: Michael Phelps for 100 meter butterfly at World Championships
- 2010: Ryan Lochte for 200 meter individual medley at Pan Pacific Championships
- 2011: Ryan Lochte for 200 meter individual medley at World Championships
- 2012: Nathan Adrian for 100 meter freestyle at Olympic Games
- 2013: Ryan Lochte for 200 meter individual medley at World Championships
- 2014: Connor Jaeger for 1500 meter freestyle at Pan Pacific Championships
- 2015: Jordan Wilimovsky for 10 km at World Championships
- 2016: Michael Phelps for 200 meter butterfly at Olympic Games
- 2017: Caeleb Dressel for 100 meter butterfly at World Championships
- 2018: Ryan Murphy for 100 meter backstroke at Pan Pacific Championships
- 2019: Caeleb Dressel for 100 meter butterfly at World Championships
- 2020: Not awarded due to the COVID-19 pandemic
- 2021: Bobby Finke for 800 meter freestyle at Olympic Games
- 2022: Bobby Finke for 800 meter freestyle at World Championships
- 2023: Bobby Finke for 1500 meter freestyle at World Championships
- 2024: Bobby Finke for 1500 meter freestyle at Olympic Games
- 2025: Not awarded
- 2026: Not awarded

=== Female Race of the Year ===
- 2004: Amanda Beard for 200 meter breaststroke at Olympic Games
- 2005: Kate Ziegler for 1500 meter freestyle at World Championships
- 2006: Whitney Myers for 200 meter individual medley at Pan Pacific Championships
- 2007: Kate Ziegler for 1500 meter freestyle at TYR Meet of Champions
- 2008: Rebecca Soni for 200 meter breaststroke at Olympic Games
- 2009: Ariana Kukors for 200 meter individual medley at World Championships
- 2010: Rebecca Soni for 200 meter breaststroke at Pan Pacific Championships
- 2011: Missy Franklin for 200 meter backstroke at 2011 World Aquatics Championships
- 2012: Katie Ledecky for 800 meter freestyle at Olympic Games
- 2013: Katie Ledecky for 1500 meter freestyle at World Championships
- 2014: Katie Ledecky for 1500 meter freestyle at Pan Pacific Championships
- 2015: Katie Ledecky for 200 meter freestyle at World Championships
- 2016: Simone Manuel for 100 meter freestyle at Olympic Games
- 2017: Lilly King for 100 meter breaststroke at World Championships
- 2018: Kathleen Baker for 100 meter backstroke at the 2018 Phillips 66 National Championships
- 2019: Regan Smith for 200 meter backstroke at World Championships
- 2020: Not awarded due to the COVID-19 pandemic
- 2021: Lydia Jacoby for 100 meter breaststroke at Olympic Games
- 2022: Katie Ledecky for 800 meter freestyle at World Championships
- 2023: Katie Grimes for 10 km at World Championships
- 2024: Torri Huske for 100 meter butterfly at Olympic Games
- 2025: Not awarded
- 2026: Not awarded

=== Fran Crippen Open Water Athlete of the Year ===
- 2023: Katie Grimes
- 2024: Katie Grimes
- 2025: Ivan Puskovitch
- 2026: Becca Mann

=== Alumni of the Year ===
- 2023: Lenny Krayzelburg
- 2024: Rowdy Gaines
- 2025: Elizabeth Beisel
- 2026: Emily Klueh

=== Perseverance Award ===
- 2004: Kaitlin Sandeno
- 2005: Brendan Hansen
- 2006: Erik Vendt
- 2007: Ryan Lochte
- 2008: Eric Shanteau
- 2009: Dana Vollmer
- 2010: Kate Ziegler
- 2011: Peter Vanderkaay
- 2012: Jessica Hardy
- 2013: Megan Romano
- 2014: Haley Anderson and Andrew Gemmell
- 2015: Allison Schmitt
- 2016: Anthony Ervin
- 2017: Matt Grevers
- 2018: Micah Sumrall
- 2019: Nathan Adrian
- 2020: Not awarded due to the COVID-19 pandemic
- 2021: Annie Lazor
- 2022: Leah Smith
- 2023: Lydia Jacoby
- 2024: Paige Madden
- 2025: Not awarded
- 2026: Not awarded

=== Impact Award ===
- 2004: Dick Ebersol
- 2008: National Collegiate Athletic Association (NCAA)
- 2012: James Mulva
- 2016: Michael Phelps
- 2021: Cecil Gordon and Bob Vincent
- 2022: Bill Maxson and Carol Zaleski
- 2023: Eddie Reese
- 2024: Arlene McDonald, Scott Davison and Lorraine Davison
- 2025: David Shackley and Maya Shackley
- 2026: Not awarded

=== Athlete Humanitarian Award ===
- 2012: Eric Shanteau

=== Team Leadership & Inspiration Award ===
- 2016: Elizabeth Beisel

=== Honorary Award ===
- 2020: 1980 US Olympic Swim Team and "front-line workers keeping Americans safe"

== See also ==
- USA Swimming
- List of sport awards
