= 2014 Pan Pacific Swimming Championships – Men's 100 metre backstroke =

Men's 100 metre backstroke at the 2014 Pan Pacific Swimming Championships
- Venue: Gold Coast Aquatic Centre
- Dates: 21 August 2014 (heats & finals)
- Competitors: 24
- Winning time: 53.02

Medalists
gold medal	Ryosuke Irie	Japan
silver medal	Matt Grevers	United States
bronze medal	Ryan Murphy	United States

The men's 100 metre backstroke competition at the 2014 Pan Pacific Swimming Championships took place on 21 August at the Gold Coast Aquatic Centre, Queensland, Australia. The last champion was Aaron Peirsol of US.

This race consisted of two lengths of the pool, all in backstroke.

== Records ==
Prior to this competition, the existing world and Pan Pacific records were as follows:

World record	Aaron Peirsol (USA)	51.94	Indianapolis, United States	8 July 2009
Pan Pacific Championships record	Aaron Peirsol (USA)	53.31	Irvine, United States	18 August 2010

== Results ==
All times are in minutes and seconds.

KEY:	q	Fastest non-qualifiers	Q	Qualified	CR	Championships record	NR	National record	PB	Personal best	SB	Seasonal best

=== Heats ===
The first round was held on 21 August, at 11:04.

Rank	Name	Nationality	Time	Notes
1	Matt Grevers	United States	52.91	QA
2	Ryan Murphy	United States	53.24	QA
3	Ryosuke Irie	Japan	53.29	QA
4	Mitchell Larkin	Australia	53.49	QA
5	David Plummer	United States	53.82	QA
6	Junya Koga	Japan	54.30	QA
7	Ben Treffers	Australia	54.34	QA
8	Josh Beaver	Australia	54.40	QA
9	Thiago Pereira	Brazil	54.43	QB
10	Nick Thoman	United States	54.44	QB
11	Guilherme Guido	Brazil	54.50	QB
12	Jacob Pebley	United States	54.57	QB
13	Russell Wood	Canada	55.15	QB
14	Fabio Santi	Brazil	55.16	QB
15	Corey Main	New Zealand	55.36	QB
16	Richard Ellis	South Africa	55.59	QB
17	Haya Matsubara	Japan	55.82	
18	Albert Subirats	Venezuela	55.95	
19	Matson Lawson	Australia	56.04	
20	Geoffrey Cheah	Hong Kong	56.68	
21	Sun Xiaolei	China	57.29	
21	Jacques van Wyk	South Africa	57.29	
23	Joe Byram	Canada	57.59	
24	Raymond Mak	Hong Kong	59.35	

=== B Final ===
The B final was held on 21 August, at 20:20.

Rank	Name	Nationality	Time	Notes
9	David Plummer	United States	53.19	
10	Josh Beaver	Australia	54.05	
11	Corey Main	New Zealand	54.70	
12	Fabio Santi	Brazil	55.08	
13	Russell Wood	Canada	55.12	
14	Haya Matsubara	Japan	55.57	
15	Richard Ellis	South Africa	55.68	
16	Albert Subirats	Venezuela	55.83	

=== A Final ===
The A final was held on 21 August, at 20:20.

Rank	Name	Nationality	Time	Notes
1st place, gold medalist(s)	Ryosuke Irie	Japan	53.02	
2nd place, silver medalist(s)	Matt Grevers	United States	53.09	
3rd place, bronze medalist(s)	Ryan Murphy	United States	53.27	
4	Mitchell Larkin	Australia	53.28	
5	Ben Treffers	Australia	53.84	
6	Junya Koga	Japan	54.02	
7	Thiago Pereira	Brazil	54.38	
8	Guilherme Guido	Brazil	54.53	
