= 2018 FINA World Swimming Championships (25 m) – Men's 200 metre backstroke =

Men's 200 metre backstroke at the 2018 FINA World Swimming Championships (25 m)
- Venue: Hangzhou Sports Park Stadium
- Dates: 16 December (heats and final)
- Competitors: 37 from 32 nations
- Winning time: 1:47.02

Medalists
gold medal	Evgeny Rylov	Russia
silver medal	Ryan Murphy	United States
bronze medal	Radosław Kawęcki	Poland
bronze medal	Mitch Larkin	Australia

The Men's 200 metre backstroke competition of the 2018 FINA World Swimming Championships (25 m) was held on 16 December 2018.

== Records ==
Prior to the competition, the existing world and championship records were as follows.

	Name	Nation	Time	Location	Date
World record	Mitch Larkin	Australia	1:45.63	Sydney	27 November 2015
Championship record	Ryan Lochte	United States	1:46.68	Dubai	19 December 2010

== Results ==
=== Heats ===
The heats were started at 09:37.

Rank	Heat	Lane	Name	Nationality	Time	Notes
1	3	1	Ryan Murphy	United States	1:49.26	Q
2	4	5	Mitch Larkin	Australia	1:49.55	Q
3	4	4	Radosław Kawęcki	Poland	1:50.05	Q
4	2	5	Evgeny Rylov	Russia	1:50.11	Q
5	3	5	Christian Diener	Germany	1:50.31	Q, WD
6	3	3	Ryosuke Irie	Japan	1:50.51	Q
7	3	4	Xu Jiayu	China	1:50.65	Q
8	3	8	Jacob Pebley	United States	1:50.80	Q
9	2	3	Hayate Matsubara	Japan	1:50.99	Q
10	4	3	Grigoriy Tarasevich	Russia	1:51.32	
11	2	1	Matteo Restivo	Italy	1:51.58	
12	4	6	Jorden Merrilees	Australia	1:51.60	
13	2	6	Anton Lončar	Croatia	1:51.79	
14	2	4	Danas Rapšys	Lithuania	1:52.25	
15	4	2	Ádám Telegdy	Hungary	1:52.48	
16	3	0	Gabriel Lópes	Portugal	1:52.66	NR
17	1	4	Omar Pinzón	Colombia	1:53.07	
18	2	2	Hugo González	Spain	1:53.08	
19	3	2	Dávid Földházi	Hungary	1:53.09	
20	2	0	Apostolos Christou	Greece	1:53.20	
21	1	3	Nils Liess	Switzerland	1:54.55	
22	4	7	Tomáš Franta	Czech Republic	1:54.78	
23	3	9	Daniel Martin	Romania	1:55.24	
24	4	1	Bradlee Ashby	New Zealand	1:55.77	
25	4	8	Tomoe Zenimoto Hvas	Norway	1:56.01	
26	3	6	Mikita Tsmyh	Belarus	1:56.14	
27	2	8	Chuang Mu-lun	Chinese Taipei	1:56.66	
28	1	5	Yeziel Morales Miranda	Puerto Rico	1:58.26	
29	1	7	Matthew Mays	United States Virgin Islands	1:58.99	
30	4	0	Berk Özkul	Turkey	1:59.04	
31	4	9	Lee Ju-ho	South Korea	1:59.48	
32	1	2	Driss Lahrichi	Morocco	1:59.50	
33	1	6	Erick Gordillo	Guatemala	1:59.80	
34	2	9	Armando Barrera Aira	Cuba	2:00.82	
35	1	8	Abdulaziz Al-Obaidly	Qatar	2:09.03	
36	1	1	Andrianirina Lalanomena	Madagascar	2:09.90	
37	1	0	Joel Gjini	Albania	2:20.26	
	2	7	Li Guangyuan	China		DNS
	3	7	Leonardo de Deus	Brazil		DNS

=== Final ===
The final was held at 18:55.

Rank	Lane	Name	Nationality	Time	Notes
1st place, gold medalist(s)	6	Evgeny Rylov	Russia	1:47.02	
2nd place, silver medalist(s)	4	Ryan Murphy	United States	1:47.34	
3rd place, bronze medalist(s)	3	Radosław Kawęcki	Poland	1:48.25	
3rd place, bronze medalist(s)	5	Mitch Larkin	Australia	1:48.25	
5	1	Jacob Pebley	United States	1:49.72	
6	7	Xu Jiayu	China	1:49.91	
7	2	Ryosuke Irie	Japan	1:50.88	
8	8	Hayate Matsubara	Japan	1:51.96	
