= 2018 Pan Pacific Swimming Championships – Mixed 4 × 100 metre medley relay =

Mixed 4 × 100 metre medley relay at the 2018 Pan Pacific Swimming Championships
- Venue: Tokyo Tatsumi International Swimming Center
- Dates: 9 August
- Competitors: 20 from 5 nations
- Winning time: 3:38.91

Medalists
gold medal	Mitch Larkin; Jake Packard; Emma McKeon; Cate Campbell	Australia
silver medal	Ryosuke Irie; Yasuhiro Koseki; Rikako Ikee; Tomomi Aoki	Japan
bronze medal	Kathleen Baker; Michael Andrew; Caeleb Dressel; Simone Manuel	United States

The mixed 4 × 100 metre medley relay competition at the 2018 Pan Pacific Swimming Championships took place on August 9 at the Tokyo Tatsumi International Swimming Center.

== Records ==
Prior to this competition, the existing world and Pan Pacific records were as follows:

World record	United States (USA); Matt Grevers (52.32); Lilly King (1:04.15); Caeleb Dressel (49.92); Simone Manuel (52.17)	3:38.56	Budapest, Hungary	26 July 2017
Pan Pacific Championships record	New event			

== Results ==
All times are in minutes and seconds.

KEY:	CR	Championships record	NR	National record	PB	Personal best	SB	Seasonal best

=== Final ===
The final was held on 9 August from 18:00.

Rank	Lane	Nation	Swimmers	Time	Notes
1st place, gold medalist(s)	3	Australia	Mitch Larkin (53.08); Jake Packard (58.68); Emma McKeon (56.22); Cate Campbell (50.93)	3:38.91	CR, OC
2nd place, silver medalist(s)	6	Japan	Ryosuke Irie (52.83); Yasuhiro Koseki (58.57); Rikako Ikee (55.53); Tomomi Aoki (54.05)	3:40.98	AS
3rd place, bronze medalist(s)	4	United States	Kathleen Baker (59.29); Michael Andrew (59.21); Caeleb Dressel (50.50); Simone Manuel (52.74)	3:41.74	
4	5	Canada	Danielle Hanus (1:01.12); Richard Funk (1:00.01); Josiah Binnema (51.56); Alexia Zevnik (54.06)	3:46.75	
5	2	Philippines	Chloe Isleta (1:04.44); Timothy Yen (1:07.61); Jarod Hatch (54.61); Nicole Oliva (57.54)	4:04.20	
