= 2012 FINA World Swimming Championships (25 m) – Men's 200 metre backstroke =

Event held at Sinan Erdem Dome in 2012

Men's 200m Backstroke at the 2012 Short Course Worlds
- Dates: 16 December (heats and final)
- Winning time: 1:48.48

Medalists
gold medal	Radosław Kawęcki	Poland
silver medal	Ryan Lochte	United States
bronze medal	Ryan Murphy	United States

The men's 200 metre backstroke event at the 11th FINA World Swimming Championships (25m) took place 16 December 2012 at the Sinan Erdem Dome.

== Records ==
Prior to this competition, the existing world and championship records were as follows.

	Name	Nation	Time	Location	Date
World record	Arkady Vyatchanin	Russia	1:46.11	Berlin	15 November 2009
Championship record	Ryan Lochte	United States	1:46.68	Dubai	19 December 2010

No new records were set during this competition.

== Results ==
=== Heats ===
Rank	Heat	Lane	Name	Time	Notes
1	4	4	Ryan Lochte (USA)	1:49.71	Q
2	3	1	Ryan Murphy (USA)	1:50.60	Q
3	5	4	Radosław Kawęcki (POL)	1:50.92	Q
4	3	5	Ashley Delaney (AUS)	1:51.20	Q
5	3	4	Péter Bernek (HUN)	1:51.33	Q
6	4	5	Kosuke Hagino (JPN)	1:51.38	Q
7	5	3	Travis Mahoney (AUS)	1:51.68	Q
8	3	3	Christian Diener (GER)	1:52.25	Q
9	1	3	Xu Jiayu (CHN)	1:52.44	
10	1	5	Alexandr Tarabrin (KAZ)	1:52.74	
11	4	6	Fabio Laugeni (ITA)	1:52.94	
12	2	8	Cheng Feiyi (CHN)	1:53.08	
13	4	3	Kazuki Watanabe (JPN)	1:53.36	
14	5	6	Yannick Lebherz (GER)	1:53.40	
15	3	7	Darren Murray (RSA)	1:53.66	
16	3	6	Damiano Lestingi (ITA)	1:53.84	
17	4	2	Corey Main (NZL)	1:54.70	
18	5	2	Lukas Räuftlin (SUI)	1:55.63	
19	5	0	Chris Walker-Hebborn (GBR)	1:55.68	
20	4	8	Chris Christensen (DEN)	1:55.83	
20	5	7	Kristian Kron (SWE)	1:55.83	
22	4	7	Andrei Shabasov (RUS)	1:55.91	
23	4	0	Danas Rapšys (LTU)	1:56.49	
24	5	8	Martin Zhelev (BUL)	1:56.53	NR
25	4	1	Michael Meyer (RSA)	1:56.79	
26	3	0	Jake Tapp (CAN)	1:57.78	
27	3	8	Jonatan Kopelev (ISR)	1:58.06	
28	5	1	Tomasz Polewka (POL)	1:58.21	
29	4	9	Charles Hockin (PAR)	1:58.91	
30	3	2	Gábor Balog (HUN)	1:59.06	
31	5	9	Armando Barrera Aira (CUB)	2:00.58	
32	3	9	Boris Kirillov (AZE)	2:02.30	
33	2	3	Jean Luis Gómez (DOM)	2:03.67	NR
34	2	5	Awse Ma'aya (JOR)	2:04.00	
35	2	6	Arvind Mani (IND)	2:08.25	
36	2	4	Rohit Imoliya (IND)	2:09.55	
37	2	2	Pablo Feo (AND)	2:11.37	
38	2	7	Faraj Farhan (BHR)	2:25.92	
39	2	1	Brandon Schuster (SAM)	2:27.19	
	1	4	Luis Rafael Rojas Martinez (VEN)	DNS	
	5	5	Aschwin Wildeboer (ESP)	DNS	

=== Final ===
The final was held at 19:11.

Rank	Lane	Name	Nationality	Time	Notes
1st place, gold medalist(s)	3	Radosław Kawęcki	Poland	1:48.48	NR
2nd place, silver medalist(s)	4	Ryan Lochte	United States	1:48.50	
3rd place, bronze medalist(s)	5	Ryan Murphy	United States	1:48.86	
4	7	Kosuke Hagino	Japan	1:51.00	
5	2	Péter Bernek	Hungary	1:51.24	
6	6	Ashley Delaney	Australia	1:51.51	
7	1	Travis Mahoney	Australia	1:52.09	
8	8	Christian Diener	Germany	1:52.48	
