= 2018 Pan Pacific Swimming Championships – Men's 4 × 100 metre medley relay =

Men's 4 × 100 metre medley relay at the 2018 Pan Pacific Swimming Championships
- Venue: Tokyo Tatsumi International Swimming Center
- Dates: 12 August
- Competitors: 24 from 6 nations
- Winning time: 3:30.20

Medalists
gold medal	Ryan Murphy; Andrew Wilson; Caeleb Dressel; Nathan Adrian	United States
silver medal	Ryosuke Irie; Yasuhiro Koseki; Yuki Kobori; Katsumi Nakamura	Japan
bronze medal	Mitch Larkin; Jake Packard; Grant Irvine; Kyle Chalmers	Australia

The men's 4 × 100 metre medley relay competition at the 2018 Pan Pacific Swimming Championships took place on August 12 at the Tokyo Tatsumi International Swimming Center. The defending champion was the United States.

== Records ==
Prior to this competition, the existing world and Pan Pacific records were as follows:

World record	United States (USA); Aaron Peirsol (52.19); Eric Shanteau (58.57); Michael Phelps (49.72); David Walters (46.80)	3:27.28	Rome, Italy	2 August 2009
Pan Pacific Championships record	United States (USA); Matt Grevers (53.10); Kevin Cordes (58.64); Michael Phelps (50.60); Nathan Adrian (47.60)	3:29.94	Gold Coast, Australia	24 August 2014

== Results ==
All times are in minutes and seconds.

KEY:	CR	Championships record	NR	National record	PB	Personal best	SB	Seasonal best

=== Final ===
The final was held on 12 August from 18:00.

Rank	Lane	Nation	Swimmers	Time	Notes
1st place, gold medalist(s)	4	United States	Ryan Murphy (52.70); Andrew Wilson (59.15); Caeleb Dressel (50.64); Nathan Adrian (47.71)	3:30.20	
2nd place, silver medalist(s)	5	Japan	Ryosuke Irie (52.61); Yasuhiro Koseki (58.62); Yuki Kobori (51.19); Katsumi Nakamura (47.83)	3:30.25	
3rd place, bronze medalist(s)	3	Australia	Mitch Larkin (53.18); Jake Packard (59.03); Grant Irvine (51.40); Kyle Chalmers (46.91)	3:30.52	
4	6	Brazil	Gabriel Fantoni (53.72); João Gomes Júnior (59.05); Vinicius Lanza (51.68); Pedro Spajari (47.71)	3:32.16	
5	2	Canada	Javier Acevedo (54.05); Richard Funk (59.79); Josiah Binnema (52.25); Yuri Kisil (48.11)	3:34.20	
6	7	Philippines	Armand Chan (1:02.06); Timothy Yen (1:08.46); Jarod Hatch (55.31); Rafael Barreto (52.93)	3:58.76	
