= Jake Packard =

Australian swimmer

Personal information
- National team: Australia
- Born: 20 June 1994 (age 32) Penrith, New South Wales, Australia
- Height: 1.96 m (6 ft 5 in)
- Weight: 93 kg (205 lb)

Sport
- Sport: Swimming
- Strokes: Breaststroke
- Coach: Chris Mooney
Medal record
Men's swimming
Representing Australia
Olympic Games
Bronze medal – third place	2016 Rio de Janeiro	4×100 m medley
World Championships (LC)
Silver medal – second place	2015 Kazan	4×100 m medley
Pan Pacific Championships
Gold medal – first place	2018 Tokyo	4×100 m mixed medley
Silver medal – second place	2018 Tokyo	100 m breaststroke
Bronze medal – third place	2014 Gold Coast	4×100 m medley
Bronze medal – third place	2018 Tokyo	4×100 m medley
Commonwealth Games
Gold medal – first place	2018 Gold Coast	4×100 m medley

Jake Packard (born 20 June 1994) is an Australian swimmer.

He competed at the 2015 World Aquatics Championships, where he won a silver medal in the 4 × 100 m medley relay. He won a bronze medal in 4 × 100 m medley at the 2016 Summer Olympics in Rio de Janeiro.
