= World and Olympic records set at the 2016 Summer Olympics =

23 world records and 91 Olympic records (exact counts were announced during the closing ceremony) were set in various events at the 2016 Summer Olympics in Rio de Janeiro.

== Olympic and world records set by sport ==
=== Archery ===
Event	Round	Name	Nation	Points	Date	Record
Men's Individual	Ranking round	Kim Woo-jin	South Korea	700	5 August	WR

=== Athletics ===
Event	Round	Name	Nation	Time (distance)	Date	Record
Women's 10,000 metres	Final	Almaz Ayana	Ethiopia	29:17.45	12 August	WR
Men's 400 metres	Final	Wayde van Niekerk	South Africa	43.03	14 August	WR
Women's hammer throw	Final	Anita Włodarczyk	Poland	82.29 m	15 August	WR
Men's pole vault	Final	Thiago Braz da Silva	Brazil	6.03 m	15 August	OR
3000m Steeplechase	Final	Conseslus Kipruto	Kenya	8:03.28	16 August	OR
Men's shot put	Final	Ryan Crouser	United States	22.52 m	18 August	OR
Men's decathlon	Final	Ashton Eaton	United States	8893 pts	18 August	OR
Women's 5,000 metres	Final	Vivian Cheruiyot	Kenya	14:26.17	20 August	OR

=== Canoeing ===
Event	Round	Name	Nation	Time	Date	Record
Women's Kayak Single 200m	Final	Lisa Carrington	New Zealand	39.864	15 August	OR
Men's Kayak Single 200m	Final	Yuriy Cheban	Ukraine	39.279	18 August	OR

=== Cycling track ===
Event	Round	Name	Nation	Time	Date	Record
Women's Team Pursuit	Qualifying	Great Britain	Great Britain	4:13.260	11 August	OR, WR
Men's Team Sprint	Qualifying	Great Britain	Great Britain	42.562	11 August	OR
Men's Team Sprint	First Round	New Zealand	New Zealand	42.535	11 August	OR
Men's Team Sprint	Finals	Great Britain	Great Britain	42.440	11 August	OR
Men's Sprint	Qualifying	Jason Kenny	Great Britain	9.551	12 August	OR
Women's Team Sprint	Qualifying	China	China	32.305	12 August	OR
Women's Team Sprint	First Round	China	China	31.928	12 August	OR, WR
Men's Team Pursuit	First Round	Great Britain	Great Britain	3:50.570	12 August	OR, WR
Men's Team Pursuit	Finals	Great Britain	Great Britain	3:50.265	12 August	OR, WR
Women's Team Pursuit	First Round	Great Britain	Great Britain	4:12.152	13 August	OR, WR
Women's Team Pursuit	Finals	Great Britain	Great Britain	4:10.236	13 August	OR, WR
Omnium Individual Pursuit	Finals	Lasse Norman Hansen	Denmark	4:14.982	13 August	OR

=== Modern pentathlon ===
Event	Round	Name	Nation	Points	Date	Record
Men's modern pentathlon	Fencing (ranking round)	Aleksander Lesun	Russia	268	18 August	OR
Women's modern pentathlon	Swimming	Gulnaz Gubaydullina	Russia	2:07:94	19 August	OR
Women's modern pentathlon	Combined Running/Shooting	Laura Asadauskaitė	Lithuania	12:01:01	19 August	OR
Men's modern pentathlon	Swimming	James Cooke	Great Britain	1:55:60	20 August	OR

=== Rowing ===
Event	Round	Name	Nation	Time	Date	Record
Men's Single Sculls	Final	Mahé Drysdale	New Zealand	6:41.34	13 August	OR

=== Shooting ===
Event	Round	Name	Nation	Score	Date	Record
Women's 10 metre air rifle	Qualifying	Du Li	China	420.7	6 August	OR
Women's 10 metre air rifle	Final	Virginia Thrasher	United States	208.0	6 August	OR
Men's 10 metre air pistol	Final	Hoàng Xuân Vinh	Vietnam	202.5	6 August	OR
Women's 10 metre air pistol	Final	Zhang Mengxue	China	199.4	7 August	OR
Men's 10 metre air rifle	Qualifying	Niccolò Campriani	Italy	630.2	8 August	OR
Men's skeet	Qualifying	Marcus Svensson; Abdullah Al-Rashidi	Sweden; Independent Olympic Athletes	123	12 August	OR
50m Rifle Prone Men	Qualifying	Sergey Kamenskiy	Russia	629.0	12 August	OR
50m Rifle Prone Men	Finals	Henri Junghänel	Germany	209.5	12 August	OR
50m Rifle 3 Positions Men	Qualifying	Sergey Kamenskiy	Russia	1184-67	14 August	OR
50m Rifle 3 Positions Men	Finals	Niccolò Campriani	Italy	458.8	14 August	OR

=== Men ===
Event	Established for	Date	Round	Name	Nationality	Time	Record	Day
Men's 100 metre breaststroke	(same)	6 August	Heats	Adam Peaty	Great Britain	57.55	WR	1
Men's 100 metre breaststroke	(same)	7 August	Final	Adam Peaty	Great Britain	57.13	WR	2
Men's 100 metre backstroke	(same)	8 August	Final	Ryan Murphy	United States	51.97	OR	3
Men's 200 metre breaststroke	(same)	9 August	Semifinal	Ippei Watanabe	Japan	2:07.22	OR	4
Men's 100 metre butterfly	(same)	12 August	Final	Joseph Schooling	Singapore	50.39	OR	7
Men's 4 × 100 metre medley relay	Men's 100 metre backstroke	13 August	Final	Ryan Murphy	United States	51.85 r	WR	8
Men's 4 × 100 metre medley relay	(same)	13 August	Final	Ryan Murphy (51.85); Cody Miller (59.03); Michael Phelps (50.33); Nathan Adrian (46.74)	United States	3:27.95	OR	8

=== Women ===
Event	Date	Round	Name	Nationality	Time	Record	Day
Women's 4 × 100 metre freestyle relay	6 August	Heats	Madison Wilson (54.11); Brittany Elmslie (53.22); Bronte Campbell (53.26); Cate Campbell (51.80)	Australia	3:32.39	OR	1
Women's 100 metre butterfly	6 August	Semifinal	Sarah Sjöström	Sweden	55.84	OR	1
Women's 400 metre individual medley	6 August	Final	Katinka Hosszú	Hungary	4:26.36	WR	1
Women's 4 × 100 metre freestyle relay	6 August	Final	Emma McKeon (53.41); Brittany Elmslie (53.12); Bronte Campbell (52.15); Cate Campbell (51.97)	Australia	3:30.65	WR	1
Women's 400 metre freestyle	7 August	Heats	Katie Ledecky	United States	3:58.71	OR	2
Women's 100 metre butterfly	7 August	Final	Sarah Sjöström	Sweden	55.48	WR	2
Women's 400 metre freestyle	7 August	Final	Katie Ledecky	United States	3:56.46	WR	2
Women's 200 metre individual medley	8 August	Heats	Katinka Hosszú	Hungary	2:07.45	OR	3
Women's 100 metre breaststroke	8 August	Final	Lilly King	United States	1:04.93	OR	3
Women's 200 metre individual medley	9 August	Final	Katinka Hosszú	Hungary	2:06.58	OR	4
Women's 100 metre freestyle	10 August	Heats	Cate Campbell	Australia	52.78	OR	5
Women's 100 metre freestyle	10 August	Semifinals	Cate Campbell	Australia	52.71	OR	5
Women's 800 metre freestyle	11 August	Heats	Katie Ledecky	United States	8.12.86	OR	6
Women's 100 metre freestyle	11 August	Final	Simone Manuel	United States	52.70	OR	6
Women's 100 metre freestyle	11 August	Final	Penny Oleksiak	Canada	52.70	OR	6
Women's 800 metre freestyle	12 August	Final	Katie Ledecky	United States	8.04.79	WR	7

Legend: r – First leg of relay

- All world records (WR) are consequently Olympic records (OR).

=== Weightlifting ===
==== Men's ====
Event	Date	Round	Name	Nationality	Weight	Record
Men's 56kg	7 August	Clean & Jerk	Long Qingquan	China	170 kg	OR
Men's 56kg	7 August	Total	Long Qingquan	China	307 kg	WR
Men's 77kg	10 August	Snatch	Lü Xiaojun	China	177 kg	WR
Men's 77kg	10 August	Clean & Jerk	Nijat Rahimov	Kazakhstan	214 kg	WR
Men's 85kg	12 August	Clean & Jerk	Tian Tao	China	217 kg	OR
Men's 85kg	12 August	Total	Kianoush Rostami	Iran	396 kg	WR
Men's 105 kg	16 August	Clean & Jerk	Ruslan Nurudinov	Uzbekistan	237 kg	OR
Men's +105 kg	16 August	Snatch	Behdad Salimi	Iran	216 kg	WR
Men's +105 kg	16 August	Total	Lasha Talakhadze	Georgia	473 kg	WR

==== Women's ====
Event	Date	Round	Name	Nationality	Weight	Record
Women's 53kg	7 August	Snatch	Li Yajun	China	101 kg	OR
Women's 58kg	8 August	Snatch	Sukanya Srisurat	Thailand	110 kg	OR
Women's 63kg	9 August	Clean & Jerk Total	Deng Wei	China	147 kg 262 kg	WR

== World records set by date ==
Date	Event	Athlete	Nation	Record description	Ref
5 August 2016	Archery – Men's individual	Kim Woo-jin	South Korea	Scored a world record of 700 in the ranking round	
6 August 2016	Swimming – Men's 100 metre breaststroke	Adam Peaty	Great Britain	Set a world record time of 57.55 in the heats	
6 August 2016	Swimming – Women's 400 metre individual medley	Katinka Hosszú	Hungary	Set a world record time of 4:26.36 in the final	
6 August 2016	Swimming – Women's 4 × 100 metre freestyle relay	Emma McKeon; Brittany Elmslie; Bronte Campbell; Cate Campbell	Australia	Set a world record time of 3:30.65 in the final	
7 August 2016	Swimming – Men's 100 metre breaststroke	Adam Peaty	Great Britain	Set a world record time of 57.13 in the final	
7 August 2016	Swimming – Women's 100 metre butterfly	Sarah Sjöström	Sweden	Set a world record time of 55.48 in the final	
7 August 2016	Swimming – Women's 400 metre freestyle	Katie Ledecky	United States	Set a world record time of 3:56.46 in the final	
7 August 2016	Weightlifting – Men's 56 kg	Long Qingquan	China	Set a world record total of 307 kg	
9 August 2016	Weightlifting – Women's 63 kg	Deng Wei	China	Set a world record at clean and jerk of 147 kg Set a world record total of 262 kg	
10 August 2016	Weightlifting – Men's 77 kg	Lü Xiaojun	China	Set a world record at snatch of 177 kg	
10 August 2016	Weightlifting – Men's 77 kg	Nijat Rahimov	Kazakhstan	Set a world record at clean and jerk of 214 kg	
11 August 2016	Cycling – Women's team pursuit	Katie Archibald; Laura Trott; Elinor Barker; Joanna Rowsell	Great Britain	Set a world record time of 4:13.260 in the qualification	
12 August 2016	Cycling – Women's team sprint	Gong Jinjie; Zhong Tianshi	China	Set a world record time of 31.928 in the first round	
12 August 2016	Cycling – Men's team pursuit	Ed Clancy; Steven Burke; Owain Doull; Bradley Wiggins	Great Britain	Set a world record time of 3:50.570 in the first round	
12 August 2016	Cycling – Men's team pursuit	Ed Clancy; Steven Burke; Owain Doull; Bradley Wiggins	Great Britain	Set a world record time of 3:50.265 in the final	
12 August 2016	Athletics – Women's 10,000 metres	Almaz Ayana	Ethiopia	Set a world record time of 29:17.45 in the final	
12 August 2016	Weightlifting – Men's 85 kg	Kianoush Rostami	Iran	Set a world record total of 396 kg	
12 August 2016	Swimming – Women's 800 metre freestyle	Katie Ledecky	United States	Set a world record time of 8:04.79 in the final	
14 August 2016	Athletics - Men's 400 metres	Wayde van Niekerk	South Africa	Set a world record time of 43.03 in the final	
15 August 2016	Athletics - Women's hammer throw	Anita Włodarczyk	Poland	Set a world record distance of 82.29 m in the final	
16 August 2016	Weightlifting - Men's +105 kg	Lasha Talakhadze	Georgia	Set a world record at snatch of 215 kg	
16 August 2016	Weightlifting - Men's +105 kg	Behdad Salimi	Iran	Set a world record at snatch of 216 kg	
16 August 2016	Weightlifting - Men's +105 kg	Lasha Talakhadze	Georgia	Set a world record total of 473 kg	
