= 2014 Pan Pacific Swimming Championships – Men's 4 × 100 metre medley relay =

Men's 4 × 100 metre medley relay at the 2014 Pan Pacific Swimming Championships
- Venue: Gold Coast Aquatic Centre
- Dates: August 24, 2014 (heats & finals)
- Winning time: 3:29.94

Medalists
| gold medal | Matt Grevers, Kevin Cordes, Michael Phelps and Nathan Adrian | United States |
| silver medal | Ryosuke Irie, Yasuhiro Koseki, Hirofumi Ikebata and Katsumi Nakamura | Japan |
| bronze medal | Mitchell Larkin, Jake Packard, Tommaso D'Orsogna and Cameron McEvoy | Australia |

The men's 4 × 100 metre medley relay competition at the 2014 Pan Pacific Swimming Championships took place on August 24 at the Gold Coast Aquatic Centre. The last champion was the United States.

== Records ==
Prior to this competition, the existing world and Pan Pacific records were as follows:

| World record | United States (USA); Aaron Peirsol (52.19); Eric Shanteau (58.57); Michael Phelps (49.72); David Walters (46.80) | 3:27.28 | Rome, Italy | August 2, 2009 |
| Pan Pacific Championships record | United States (USA); Aaron Peirsol (53.74); Brendan Hansen (59.18); Ian Crocker (50.92); Jason Lezak (47.95) | 3:31.79 | Victoria, Canada | August 20, 2006 |

== Results ==
All times are in minutes and seconds.

| KEY: | q | Fastest non-qualifiers | Q | Qualified | CR | Championships record | NR | National record | PB | Personal best | SB | Seasonal best |

=== Heats ===
Heats weren't performed, as only eight teams had entered.

=== Final ===
The final was held on August 24, at 21:16.

| Rank | Name | Nationality | Time | Notes |
|---|---|---|---|---|
| 1st place, gold medalist(s) | Matt Grevers (53.10); Kevin Cordes (58.64); Michael Phelps (50.60); Nathan Adrian (47.60) | United States | 3:29.94 | CR |
| 2nd place, silver medalist(s) | Ryosuke Irie (52.99); Yasuhiro Koseki (59.52); Hirofumi Ikebata (51.81); Katsumi Nakamura (47.76) | Japan | 3:32.08 | |
| 3rd place, bronze medalist(s) | Mitch Larkin (53.46); Jake Packard (1:00.02); Tommaso D'Orsogna (52.34); Cameron McEvoy (47.63) | Australia | 3:33.45 | |
| 4 | Guilherme Guido (54.55); Felipe França (59.70); Thiago Pereira (51.85); Marcelo Chierighini (48.84) | Brazil | 3:34.94 | |
| 5 | Russell Wood (55.35); Richard Funk (1:00.80); Coleman Allen (53.10); Yuri Kisil (49.18) | Canada | 3:38.43 | |
| 6 | Corey Main (54.61); Glenn Snyders (59.38); Steven Kent (55.29); Matthew Stanley (49.18) | New Zealand | 3:38.46 | |
| 7 | Richard Ellis (55.67); Jared Pike (1:04.11); Ryan Coetzee (55.68); Douglas Erasmus (50.51) | South Africa | 3:45.97 | |
| 8 | Raymond Mak (59.24); Ronald Tsui (1:03.79); Geoffrey Cheah (54.05); Jeremy Wong (51.02) | Hong Kong | 3:48.10 | |
