= Hayate Matsubara =

Japanese swimmer

Personal information
- Nationality: Japanese
- Born: 5 December 1991 (age 34)

Sport
- Sport: Swimming

Hayate Matsubara (born 5 December 1991) is a Japanese swimmer. He competed in the men's 200 metre backstroke event at the 2018 FINA World Swimming Championships (25 m), in Hangzhou, China.
