= Masaki Kaneko =

Japanese swimmer (born 1992)

Personal information
- Born: 27 March 1992 (age 34)

Sport
- Sport: Swimming
Medal record
World Championships (SC)
Bronze medal – third place	2016 Windsor	200 m backstroke
Asian Games
Silver medal – second place	2018 Jakarta	4×100 m medley
Silver medal – second place	2018 Jakarta	4×100 m mixed medley

Masaki Kaneko (金子 雅紀, Kaneko Masaki; born 27 March 1992) is a Japanese swimmer. He competed in the men's 200 metre backstroke event at the 2016 Summer Olympics.
