= Radosław Kawęcki =

Polish swimmer

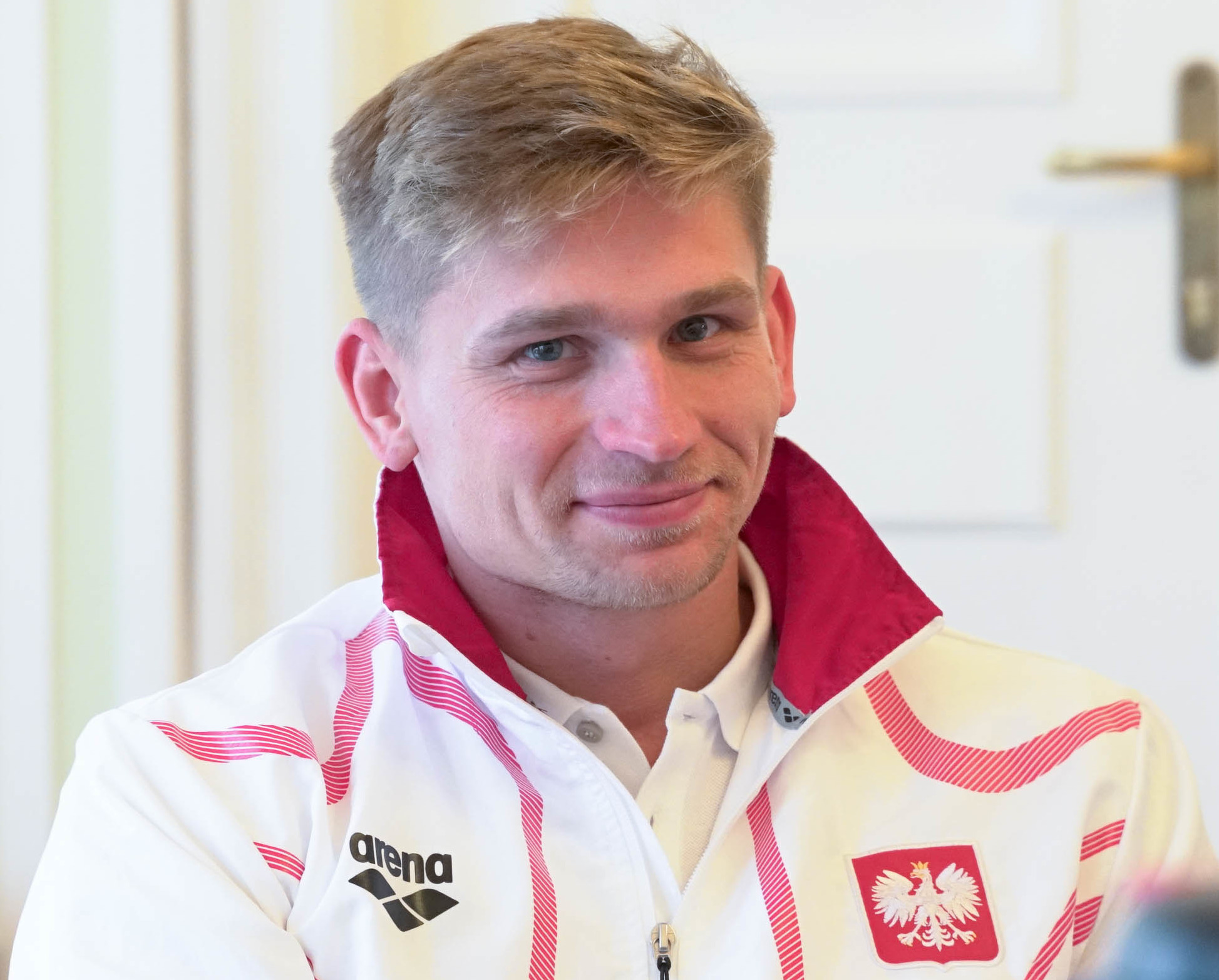
- Kawęcki in 2021

Personal information
- National team: Poland
- Born: 16 August 1991 (age 34) Głogów, Poland
- Height: 1.88 m (6 ft 2 in)
- Weight: 82 kg (181 lb)

Sport
- Sport: Swimming
- Strokes: Backstroke
- Club: Cali Condors
Medal record
Men's swimming
Representing Poland
Event	1st	2nd	3rd
World Championships (LC)	0	2	0
World Championships (SC)	4	1	1
European Championships (LC)	3	1	0
European Championships (SC)	7	2	0
Total	14	6	1
World Championships (LC)
Silver medal – second place	2013 Barcelona	200 m backstroke
Silver medal – second place	2015 Kazan	200 m backstroke
World Championships (SC)
Gold medal – first place	2012 Istanbul	200 m backstroke
Gold medal – first place	2014 Doha	200 m backstroke
Gold medal – first place	2016 Windsor	200 m backstroke
Gold medal – first place	2021 Abu Dhabi	200 m backstroke
Silver medal – second place	2014 Doha	100 m backstroke
Bronze medal – third place	2018 Hangzhou	200 m backstroke
European Championships (LC)
Gold medal – first place	2012 Debrecen	200 m backstroke
Gold medal – first place	2014 Berlin	200 m backstroke
Gold medal – first place	2016 London	200 m backstroke
Silver medal – second place	2018 Glasgow	200 m backstroke
European Championships (SC)
Gold medal – first place	2011 Szczecin	100 m backstroke
Gold medal – first place	2011 Szczecin	200 m backstroke
Gold medal – first place	2012 Chartres	200 m backstroke
Gold medal – first place	2013 Herning	200 m backstroke
Gold medal – first place	2015 Netanya	100 m backstroke
Gold medal – first place	2015 Netanya	200 m backstroke
Gold medal – first place	2019 Glasgow	200 m backstroke
Gold medal – first place	2021 Kazan	200 m backstroke
Silver medal – second place	2009 Istanbul	200 m backstroke
Silver medal – second place	2017 Copenhagen	200 m backstroke
World Junior Championships
Bronze medal – third place	2008 Monterrey	200 m backstroke
European Junior Championships
Gold medal – first place	2009 Prague	200 m backstroke
Military World Games
Silver medal – second place	2019 Wuhan	200 m backstroke
Bronze medal – third place	2019 Wuhan	4×200 m freestyle
Bronze medal – third place	2019 Wuhan	4×100 m medley

Radosław Kawęcki (born 16 August 1991) is a Polish competitive swimmer who specializes in backstroke events. Kawęcki won the silver medal in the 200 m backstroke at the 2013 and 2015 World Aquatics Championships, and was twice the 200 m backstroke short course world champion. He won four gold medals at the FINA World Swimming Championships in the 200 m backstroke. He is an 8-time European champion in the backstroke events. Kawęcki finished fourth at the 2012 Summer Olympics in London in the 200-meter backstroke. He currently represents the Cali Condors which is part of the International Swimming League.

== Career ==
=== World Championships ===
A backstroke specialist, he won silver in the 200 m backstroke at the 2013 and 2015 World Championships. In the short course World Championships, he has 3 golds (2012, 2014 and 2016) and 1 bronze (2018) in this event, as well as a silver medal in the 100 m backstroke from the 2014 World Short Course Championships.

=== European Championships ===
At the European Long Course Swimming Championships, Kawęcki has also won 3 gold medals (2012, 2014 and 2016) in the 200 m backstroke, along with a silver medal in the event in 2018.

In the European Short Course Championships, Kawęcki has 6 gold medals in the 200 m backstroke (2011, 2012, 2013, 2015, 2019 and 2021) and 2 silver medals (2009, 2017), alongside 2 gold medals in the 100 m backstroke event (2011 and 2015).

=== International Swimming League ===
In 2019 he was a member of the inaugural International Swimming League representing the Cali Condors, who finished third place in the final match in Las Vegas, Nevada in December. Kawecki scored points in all 3 backstroke events as well as the medley relay for the Condors throughout the season.

Records
Preceded by Arkady Vyatchanin	Men's 200 metre backstroke European record holder (long course); 2 August 2013 – 21 April 2016	Succeeded by Evgeny Rylov
