= Corey Main =

New Zealand swimmer (born 1995)

Personal information
- Born: Corey Charles Garth Main; 27 February 1995 (age 31) Auckland, New Zealand
- Education: Macleans College; University of Florida
- Height: 188 cm (6 ft 2 in)
- Weight: 85 kg (187 lb)

Sport
- Country: New Zealand
- Sport: Swimming
Medal record
Men's swimming
Representing New Zealand
Junior Pan Pacific Championships
Silver medal – second place	2012 Honolulu	100 m backstroke
Bronze medal – third place	2012 Honolulu	200 m backstroke

Corey Charles Garth Main (born 27 February 1995) is a New Zealand swimmer who qualified to compete at the 2016 Summer Olympics to be held in Rio de Janeiro, Brazil, in the men's 100 metre backstroke.

== Personal life ==
Main was born in Auckland on 27 February 1995. Of Māori descent, Main affiliates to the Ngāti Porou and Ngāpuhi iwi. He attended Macleans College in Auckland and now studies at the University of Florida on a scholarship, where he trains under Gregg Troy and competes for the Florida Gators swimming team.

== Career ==
Main is a member of the Howick Pakuranga swimming club where he was coached by Gary Hollywood from 2005 to 2012. He competed at the 2011 Commonwealth Youth Games held in the Isle of Man, where he won four medals in the swimming events. Main won gold medals in the 50 metre, 100 metre, and 200 metre backstroke events, and was part of the New Zealand team that won the bronze medal in the 4 × 200 metre freestyle relay.

For the 2012 Junior Pan Pacific Swimming Championships contested at the Veterans Memorial Aquatic Center in Honolulu, United States, Main won the silver medal in the 100 metre backstroke with a time of 54.96 seconds, the bronze medal in the 200 metre backstroke with a 1:59.67, placed fifth on the 4×100 metre medley relay in 3:58.53, and sixth on the 4×100 metre freestyle relay in 3:37.06.

At the 2014 Commonwealth Games held in Glasgow, Scotland, Main competed in the 100 metre and 200 metre backstroke and swam the backstroke leg in the 4 × 100 metre medley relay. He made the final in both of his individual events, finishing fourth in the 200 metre backstroke.

In 2015, he competed at the 16th FINA World Championships held in Kazan, Russia. He reached the semifinals of the 200 metre backstroke, finishing 16th overall. He also competed in the 100 metre backstroke, finishing 22nd in the heats and not advancing, and was part of the New Zealand team which placed 16th in the men's 4 × 100 metre medley relay.

At the 2016 Canadian Olympic Trials held in Toronto, Ontario, the second official trial for New Zealand swimmers to meet the qualifying times for 2016 Summer Olympics, Main completed his heat of the 100 metre backstroke event in a time of 54.27 seconds, faster than 54.36 seconds FINA A qualifying standard for the Rio Games.

On 15 April 2016 Main was named as one of five Olympic debutants in a squad of eight swimmers to represent New Zealand at the 2016 Summer Olympics in Rio de Janeiro, Brazil, where he competed in both the 100m and 200m Backstroke events. Main won his men's 100m backstroke heat with a time of 53.99 seconds to qualify for the semifinals. He finished 15th overall in the semifinals with a time of 54.29 seconds, but did not progress to the final. In the men's 200m backstroke event Main qualified 15th fastest for the semifinals with a time of 1:57.51 however his time of 1:58.08 was not enough to take him through into the final.

Corey retired from competitive swimming in 2019 at the age of 24, to pursue coaching certifications and finance jobs in the United States.
