= Mitch Larkin =

Australian swimmer (born 1993)

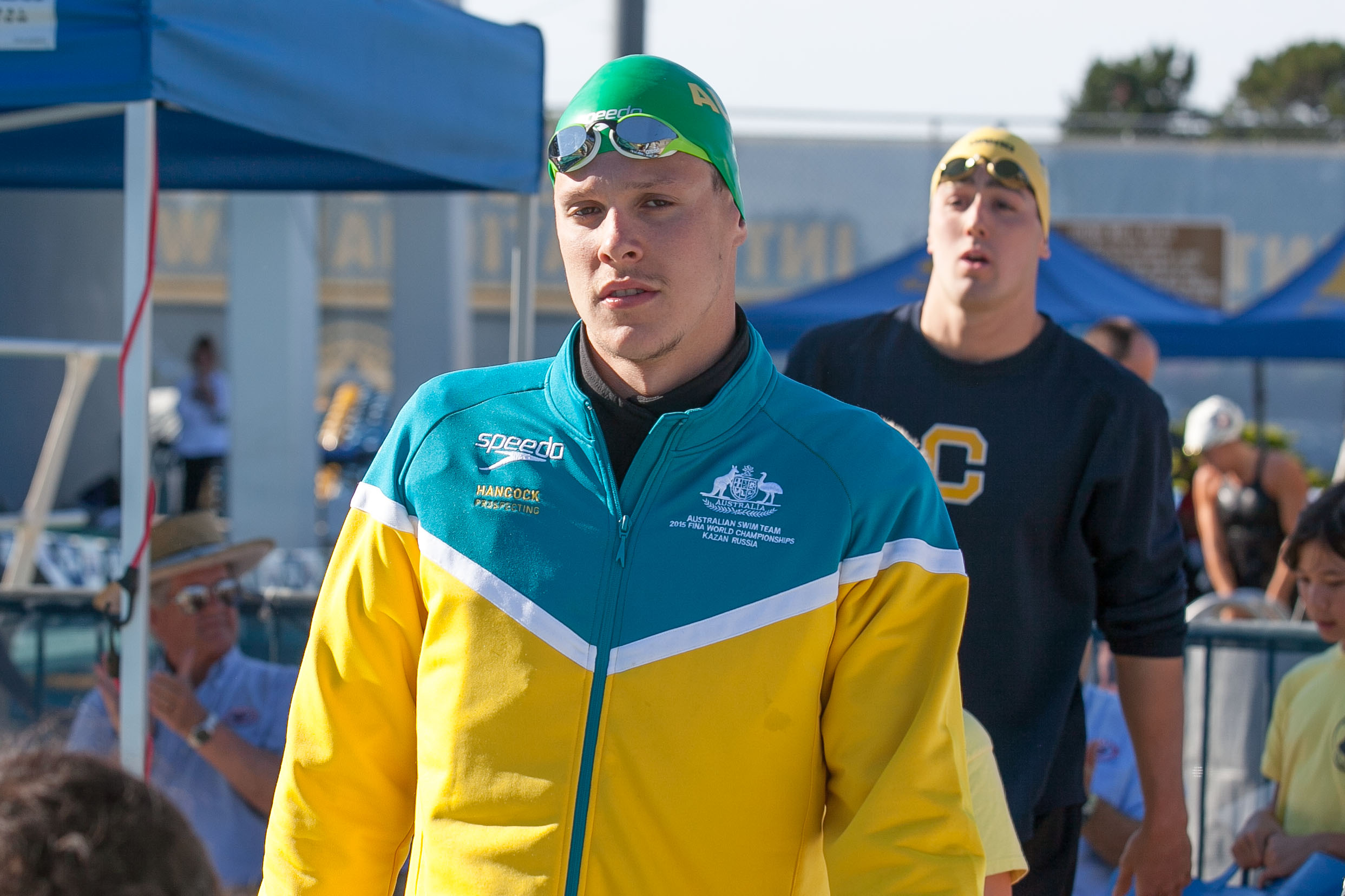
- Larkin in 2016, at the Santa Clara Arena Grand Prix

Personal information
- Full name: Mitchell James Larkin
- Nickname: "Mitch" "Larkinator"
- National team: Australia
- Born: 9 July 1993 (age 33) Nambour, Queensland, Australia
- Height: 1.88 m (6 ft 2 in)
- Weight: 75 kg (165 lb)

Sport
- Sport: Swimming
- Strokes: Backstroke, medley
- Club: Cali Condors; Chandler
Medal record
Men's swimming
Representing Australia
Olympic Games
Silver medal – second place	2016 Rio de Janeiro	200 m backstroke
Bronze medal – third place	2016 Rio de Janeiro	4×100 m medley
World Championships (LC)
Gold medal – first place	2015 Kazan	100 m backstroke
Gold medal – first place	2015 Kazan	200 m backstroke
Gold medal – first place	2019 Gwangju	4×100 m mixed medley
Silver medal – second place	2015 Kazan	4×100 m medley
Silver medal – second place	2017 Budapest	4×100 m mixed medley
Bronze medal – third place	2019 Gwangju	100 m backstroke
World Championships (SC)
Gold medal – first place	2014 Doha	100 m backstroke
Gold medal – first place	2016 Windsor	100 m backstroke
Silver medal – second place	2016 Windsor	4×100 m medley
Bronze medal – third place	2014 Doha	200 m backstroke
Bronze medal – third place	2016 Windsor	4×200 m freestyle
Bronze medal – third place	2018 Hangzhou	200 m backstroke
Pan Pacific Championships
Gold medal – first place	2018 Tokyo	4×100 m mixed medley
Silver medal – second place	2018 Tokyo	200 m medley
Bronze medal – third place	2014 Gold Coast	200 m backstroke
Bronze medal – third place	2014 Gold Coast	4×100 m medley
Bronze medal – third place	2018 Tokyo	100 m backstroke
Bronze medal – third place	2018 Tokyo	4×100 m medley
Commonwealth Games
Gold medal – first place	2014 Glasgow	200 m backstroke
Gold medal – first place	2018 Gold Coast	50 m backstroke
Gold medal – first place	2018 Gold Coast	100 m backstroke
Gold medal – first place	2018 Gold Coast	200 m backstroke
Gold medal – first place	2018 Gold Coast	200 m medley
Gold medal – first place	2018 Gold Coast	4×100 m medley
Gold medal – first place	2022 Birmingham	4×100 m mixed medley
Silver medal – second place	2014 Glasgow	100 m backstroke
Silver medal – second place	2014 Glasgow	50 m backstroke
Silver medal – second place	2014 Glasgow	4×100 m medley
Silver medal – second place	2022 Birmingham	4×100 m medley
Oceanian Championships
Gold medal – first place	2010 Apia	200 m medley
Gold medal – first place	2010 Apia	400 m medley
Silver medal – second place	2010 Apia	200 m backstroke

Mitchell James Larkin (born 9 July 1993) is an Australian former competitive swimmer who specialises in backstroke events. He represented the Cali Condors as part of the International Swimming League. Larkin competed for Australia at the 2012 Summer Olympics, 2016 Summer Olympics and the 2020 Summer Olympics.

== Career ==
=== 2014 ===
Larkin won a gold medal in the 200 meter backstroke and a silver medal in both the 50 meter and 100 meter backstroke at the 2014 Commonwealth Games in Glasgow, Scotland.

=== 2015 ===
He won two gold in the 100 meter and 200 meter backstroke at the 2015 World Aquatics Championships in Kazan, Russia.

His personal best in long course events are 52.11 for the 100 meter backstroke and 1:53.17 for the 200 meter backstroke, both set at the Dubai world cup in November 2015.

In November 2015, Larkin broke the short course world record in the 200 meter backstroke, lowering it to 1:45.63.

=== 2016 ===
At the 2016 Summer Olympics swimming championships, Larkin represented Australia in the 100 metre and 200 metre backstroke and the 4 x 100 meter medley relay. In the 100 metre backstroke, Larkin was the third fastest in the heats with a time of 53.04 and third fastest out of the two second semi-final heats with a time of 52.70.

Despite only being three hundredths slower than his gold medal-winning time at the 2015 world championships, he missed out on a medal, finishing fourth in the final with a time of 52.43.

Larkin set a record as the first swimmer to win every backstroke event and also the most gold medals for a swimmer at a single Commonwealth Games event. Five gold medals included 50 meter, 100 meter and 200 meter backstroke, as well as the 200 meter Individual Medley and 4 x 100 meter Medley.

=== International Swimming League ===
In 2019 he was a member of the inaugural International Swimming League representing the Cali Condors, who finished third place in the final match in Las Vegas, Nevada in December. Larkin was one of the top point scorers at each match for the Condors swimming backstroke, IM, and relays.

== World records ==
=== Short course metres ===
No.	Event	Time	Meet	Location	Date	Status	Ref
1	200 m backstroke	1:45.63	Australian Championships (25m)	Sydney, Australia	27 November 2015	Former	

Legend: OC – Oceanian record; NR – Australian record;
Records not set in finals: h – heat; sf – semifinal; r – relay 1st leg; rh – relay heat 1st leg; b – B final; † – en route to final mark; so – swim-off; tt – time trial

== See also ==
- List of Commonwealth Games medallists in swimming (men)
- World record progression 200 metres backstroke

Records
Preceded by Arkady Vyatchanin	Men's 200-metre backstroke world record holder (short course); 27 November 2015 – present	Succeeded by Incumbent
Awards
Preceded by Kosuke Hagino	Pacific Rim Swimmer of the Year; 2015	Succeeded by Kosuke Hagino
Preceded by Chad le Clos	FINA Swimmer of the Year; 2015	Succeeded by Michael Phelps
