= Ryosuke Irie =

Japanese swimmer (born 1990)

Ryosuke Irie OLY
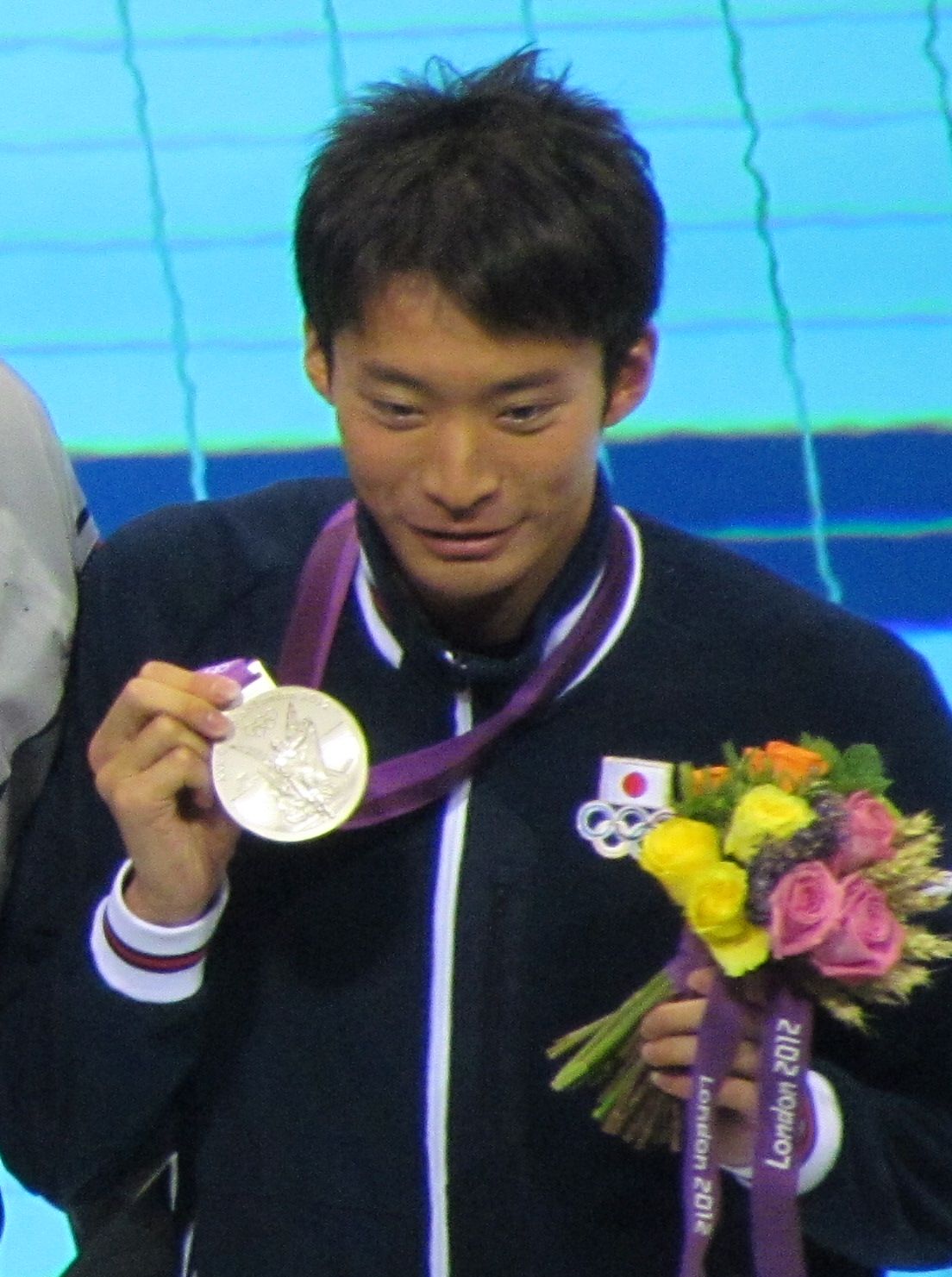
- Irie at the 2012 Summer Olympics

Personal information
- Full name: Ryosuke Irie
- Nicknames: Iriemon, Kitajima no.2
- National team: Japan
- Born: 24 January 1990 (age 36) Tennoji-ku, Osaka, Japan
- Height: 1.78 m (5 ft 10 in)
- Weight: 62 kg (137 lb)

Sport
- Sport: Swimming
- Strokes: Backstroke
- Club: Itoman Toshin
- College team: Kindai University
Medal record
Men's swimming
Representing Japan
Event	1st	2nd	3rd
Olympic Games	0	2	1
World Championships (LC)	0	2	2
World Championships (SC)	0	0	2
Pan Pacific Championships	1	6	1
Asian Games	6	8	0
Summer Universiade	6	1	0
Total	13	19	6
Olympic Games
Silver medal – second place	2012 London	200 m backstroke
Silver medal – second place	2012 London	4×100 m medley
Bronze medal – third place	2012 London	100 m backstroke
World Championships (LC)
Silver medal – second place	2009 Rome	200 m backstroke
Silver medal – second place	2011 Shanghai	200 m backstroke
Bronze medal – third place	2011 Shanghai	100 m backstroke
Bronze medal – third place	2013 Barcelona	4×100m medley
World Championships (SC)
Bronze medal – third place	2014 Doha	100 m backstroke
Bronze medal – third place	2018 Hangzhou	4×100 m medley
Pan Pacific Championships
Gold medal – first place	2014 Gold Coast	100 m backstroke
Silver medal – second place	2014 Gold Coast	200 m backstroke
Silver medal – second place	2014 Gold Coast	4×100 m medley
Silver medal – second place	2018 Tokyo	100 m backstroke
Silver medal – second place	2018 Tokyo	200 m backstroke
Silver medal – second place	2018 Tokyo	4×100 m medley
Silver medal – second place	2018 Tokyo	4×100 m mixed medley
Bronze medal – third place	2010 Irvine	200 m backstroke
Asian Games
Gold medal – first place	2006 Doha	200 m backstroke
Gold medal – first place	2010 Guangzhou	100 m backstroke
Gold medal – first place	2010 Guangzhou	200 m backstroke
Gold medal – first place	2010 Guangzhou	4×100 m medley
Gold medal – first place	2014 Incheon	100 m backstroke
Gold medal – first place	2014 Incheon	200 m backstroke
Silver medal – second place	2010 Guangzhou	50 m backstroke
Silver medal – second place	2014 Incheon	50 m backstroke
Silver medal – second place	2014 Incheon	4×100 m medley
Silver medal – second place	2018 Jakarta	50 m backstroke
Silver medal – second place	2018 Jakarta	100 m backstroke
Silver medal – second place	2018 Jakarta	200 m backstroke
Silver medal – second place	2018 Jakarta	4×100 m medley
Silver medal – second place	2018 Jakarta	4×100 m mixed medley
Silver medal – second place	2022 Hangzhou	100 m backstroke
Silver medal – second place	2022 Hangzhou	4×100 m mixed medley
Bronze medal – third place	2022 Hangzhou	50 m backstroke
Bronze medal – third place	2022 Hangzhou	4×100 m medley
Summer Universiade
Gold medal – first place	2009 Belgrade	100 m backstroke
Gold medal – first place	2009 Belgrade	200 m backstroke
Gold medal – first place	2009 Belgrade	4×100 m medley
Gold medal – first place	2011 Shenzhen	50 m backstroke
Gold medal – first place	2011 Shenzhen	200 m backstroke
Gold medal – first place	2011 Shenzhen	4×100 m medley
Silver medal – second place	2009 Belgrade	50 m backstroke

Ryosuke Irie (入江 陵介, Irie Ryōsuke; born 24 January 1990) is a Japanese retired competitive swimmer who competes in backstroke events. He is a Kindai University student in Osaka.

He won a silver medal in the 200 metre backstroke and a bronze in the 100 metre backstroke at the 2012 Summer Olympics, along with a silver in the men's 4 × 100 m medley with the Japanese team. His backstroke technique has often been compared to Roland Matthes, who was described as the Rolls-Royce of swimming.

== Biography ==
He was born in Osaka and started his actual swimming career in his junior high school years. When he was in the second grade, future Olympic backstroke medalist Ryosuke Irie hated swimming. He loathed it so much that his mother had to carry a crying Irie to his coach at poolside.

When he first joined, Irie was one of the slowest swimmers in the elite Itoman Toshin swimming school in Suminoe Ward, Osaka. He joined the school because his older brother, Shinpei Irie, who had won numerous national-level competitions, was in the program. He reluctantly continued swimming only because his mother, Kumiko, promised she would ask the coach if he could quit a year after he joined the school.

Irie initially trained in freestyle, but began swimming the backstroke alone for long periods before and after practice. Backstroke was suitable for Irie because it did not require as much power as freestyle, and soon, Irie began winning national-level competitions and breaking junior high school records.

A year after Irie began training at the elite school, his mother had forgotten her promise to ask the coach if her son could quit.

In 2005 he won the national high school championships in 200 meter backstroke when he was a first year grade student. He made new high school student record in Japanese national championships in April 2006. He narrowly missed the entry for FINA World Aquatics Championships of that year. He won a gold medal with the time of 1:58.85 in 200 m backstroke at the 2006 Asian Games in Doha, Qatar.

In August 2007, he attended his first world swimming competition, International Swim Meet 2007 held in Chiba, Japan. On August 22, he beat the previous high school record in 100 m backstroke with the time of 54.07 s. The next day, he beat another high school record in 200 m backstroke with the time of 1:57.03.

=== World record controversy ===
He swam the 200 meter backstroke in a Japanese record time of 1:52.86 on May 10, 2009, in a Japan-Australia swimming contest held in Canberra. Even though the time was lower than the world record, his time was rejected by FINA, swimming's international governing body, because he did not wear an approved suit. Japan's swimming federation did approve the record, however, along with several others in which Japanese swimmers wore unapproved suits that were later ruled to yield an unfair advantage. Irie's time would have sliced a massive 1.08 seconds off the 200 meter record set by American Ryan Lochte when he won gold at the Beijing Olympics. The high-tech swimsuit, which is made by Japanese sport wear manufacture Descente (who owns Arena), was not approved by FINA in a meeting held on May 20, 2009, and was called for modifications along with other 136 models. In the same meet, he swam a time of 52.56, which was only 0.02 seconds off the world record of Aaron Peirsol, set at the Olympic Games the previous year. With an approved suit, Irie won the silver, Lochte the bronze and Aaron Peirsol won gold in the 200m backstroke at the 2009 World Aquatics Championships in Rome later that year. Irie's time of 1:52.51 was a new Asian record, and the second fastest in the history of 200m backstroke.

== Swimming technique ==
Ryosuke Irie is praised for having one of the most graceful and effective backstroke technique in the world. One of the drills that he credits his technique to is training backstroke with a water bottle on his head (Invented by East Carolina University Swim and Dive, 1990's), to enforce head stability and the smoothness of his stroke. Irie notes that attention to achieving a perfect technique from a young age may contribute to his success, as his smaller size in comparison to other world-class backstrokers may be seen as a disadvantage. While he did not medal at the Rio 2016 games he continues to train in hopes of winning gold in his home country at the Tokyo 2020 Olympic Games.

== Personal bests and records ==
Long course (50 m)

Event	Time		Date	Meet	Location	Ref
50 m backstroke	24.79	(h)	1 Aug 2009	World Championships	Rome, Italy	
100 m backstroke	52.24	NR	5 Sep 2009	Japan University Championships	Kumamoto, Japan	
200 m backstroke	1:52.51	AS, NR	31 Jul 2009	World Championships	Rome, Italy	

Short course (25 m)

Event	Time		Date	Meet	Location	Ref
50 m backstroke	24.32	(h)	17 Dec 2010	World SC Championships	Dubai, United Arab Emirates	
100 m backstroke	49.91		25 Oct 2020	2020 International Swimming League Match 3	Budapest, Hungary	
200 m backstroke	1:49.78	AS, NR	26 Feb 2011	Japanese SC National Championships	Tokyo, Japan	

Legend: AS – Asian record; NR – Japanese record;
Records not set in finals: h – heat; sf – semifinal; r – relay 1st leg; rh – relay heat 1st leg; b – B final; † – en route to final mark; so – swim-off; tt – time trial

Sporting positions
Preceded by Rebecca Soni	Mare Nostrum Tour Overall Winner; 2011	Succeeded by Incumbent
