= Josiah Binnema =

Canadian swimmer (born 1997)

Personal information
- Full name: Josiah James Binnema
- Born: 8 November 1997 (age 28) Edmonton, Alberta, Canada
- Height: 6 ft 2 in (188 cm)
- Weight: 185 lb (84 kg)

Sport
- Sport: Swimming
- Strokes: Butterfly, Backstroke
- Club: High Performance Centre - Vancouver
- College team: University Of Alberta, University of British Columbia

Josiah Binnema (born 8 November 1997) is a Canadian swimmer.

== Career ==
His first international appearance came at the 2015 FINA World Junior Swimming Championships, where he placed 18th in the 50m butterfly, 6th in the 4x100 metre medley relay, and 11th in the 100-m butterfly setting a new Junior Canadian Record of 53.86. He competed in the 2017 World Aquatics Championships, placing 37th in the Men's 50 metre butterfly, 34th in the Men's 100 metre butterfly and 12th in 4x100 metre medley relay. In the 2018 Commonwealth Games Binnema managed 12th in the Men’s 200 backstroke, 9th in the Men’s 50 butterfly, 5th in the Men’s 100 butterfly final and 4th in the 4x100 medley relay.

In Tokyo for the 2018 Pan Pacific Swimming Championships Binnema swam four races. He swam the Men’s 200 metre backstroke placing 18th, the Men’s 100 metre butterfly where he placed 11th, and the 4x100 medley relay, in which the team placed 5th overall. Binnema’s best performance came in the 4x100 Mixed Medley relay, where he swam 51.56 seconds on the butterfly leg of the relay, which is the second fastest split in Canadian history. The 2019 World Championships in Gwangju, Korea only saw one appearance from Binnema which was Men’s 100 metre butterfly where he placed 24th. Later that month Binnema swam the Men’s 50 butterfly and Men’s 100 butterfly in the 2019 FINA Swimming World Cup.

== Sources ==
- "Heats results". FINA. Archived from the original on 28 July 2017.
- "2017 World Aquatics Championships > Search via Athletes". Budapest 2017. Archived from the original on 22 October 2018.
- "Swimming Canada Nominates 26 Athletes to Canada's 2018 Commonwealth Games Team". www.swimming.ca. Swimming Canada. 26 September 2017.
- "Oleksiak, Masse headline Canadian swim team for Commonwealth Games". www.cbc.ca. Canadian Broadcasting Corporation (CBC). 26 September 2017.
