= Jacob Pebley =

American swimmer

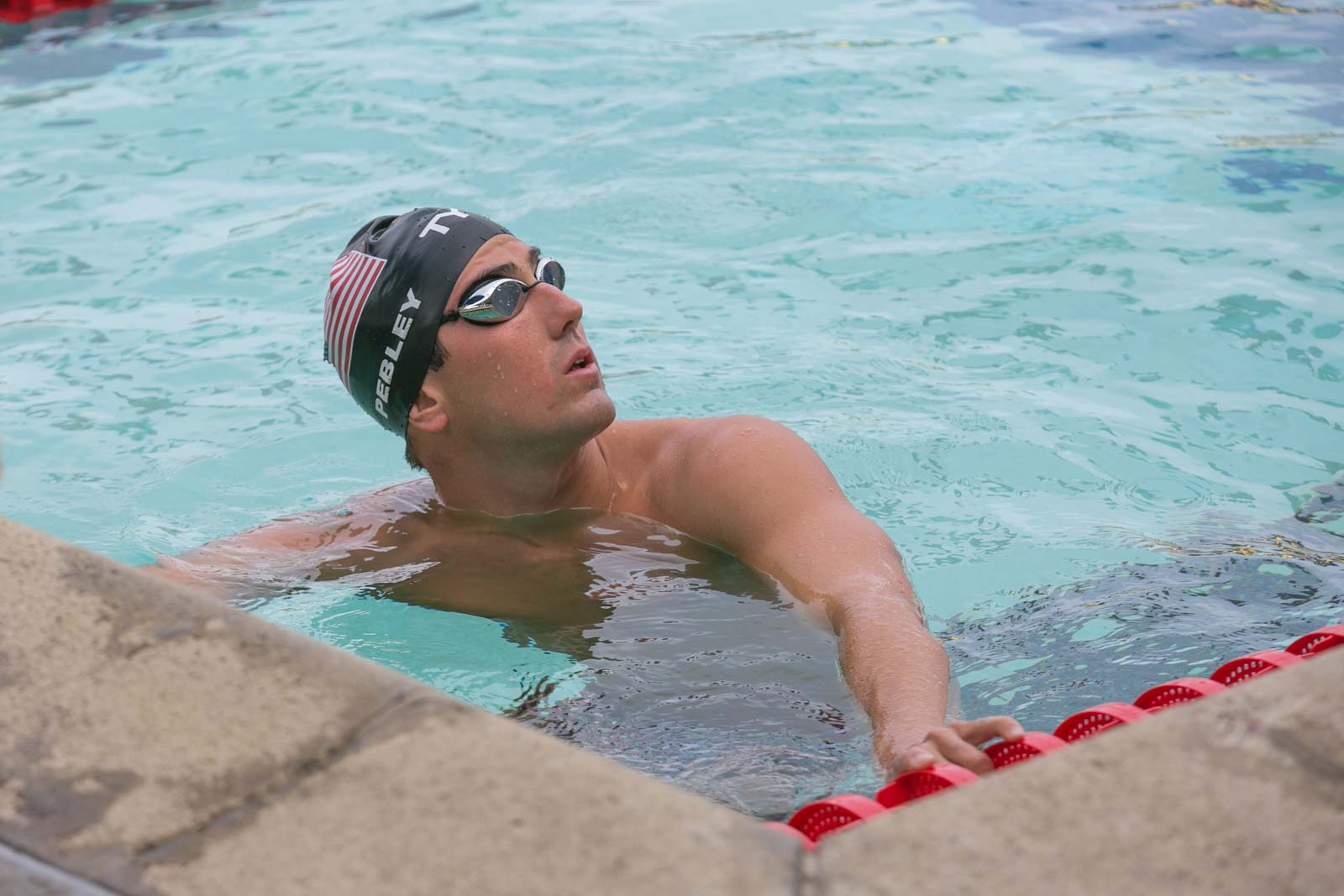
- Pebley at the 2018 Santa Clara Grand Prix

Personal information
- National team: United States
- Born: September 17, 1993 (age 32) Corvallis, Oregon, U.S.
- Height: 6 ft 4 in (193 cm)
- Weight: 184 lb (83 kg)

Sport
- Sport: Swimming
- Strokes: Backstroke
- Club: DC Trident
- College team: University of California, Berkeley
Medal record
World Championships (LC)
| Bronze medal – third place | 2017 Budapest | 200 m backstroke |
World Championships (SC)
| Gold medal – first place | 2016 Windsor | 4×200 m freestyle |
| Silver medal – second place | 2016 Windsor | 200 m backstroke |
| Silver medal – second place | 2016 Windsor | 4×50 m medley |
Summer Universiade
| Gold medal – first place | 2015 Gwangju | 200 m backstroke |
| Silver medal – second place | 2015 Gwangju | 4×100 m medley |
| Bronze medal – third place | 2013 Kazan | 100 m backstroke |
| Bronze medal – third place | 2013 Kazan | 200 m backstroke |
| Bronze medal – third place | 2013 Kazan | 4×100 m medley |

Jacob Pebley (born September 17, 1993) is a retired American competition swimmer who specializes in the backstroke. He will be representing DC Trident in the International Swimming League during the 2020 season.

In college, he was an NCAA runner-up in the 200-yard backstroke.

Pebley won the 200-meter backstroke at the 2015 Summer Universiade.

In the 200-meter backstroke, Pebley finished 2nd at the 2016 United States Olympic Trials to qualify for the 2016 Olympics.

== Personal life ==
Jacob Pebley was born September 17, 1993, to parents Walter Pebley and Cathy Worth Pebley in Albany, Oregon. In 2006, Pebley lost his mother to cancer as he was entering 7th grade. The two and a half year battle he saw his mother endure inspired him to live with the same determination and compassion.

His parents, Walt Pebley and Cheslah Barkdol, along with his brothers Luke Pebley, Eric Young, sisters Katie Young, Noel Young and Hali Barkdoll are part of his support team.

Growing up, Pebley swam for the Corvallis Aquatic Team under coach Rick Guenther and attended Crescent Valley High School prior to moving to the University of California.
