= Swimming at the 2012 Summer Olympics – Qualification =

For the swimming competitions at the 2012 Summer Olympics the following qualification systems were in place. The list has been updated to 20 August 2011. Qualification ended on 3 July 2012.

== Qualifying standards ==
A National Olympic Committee (NOC) may enter up to 2 qualified athletes in each individual event if both meet the Olympic Qualifying Time (OQT). 1 athlete per event can potentially qualify should they meet the Olympic Selection Time (OST) and if the quota of 900 athletes has not been met. NOCs may enter swimmers regardless of time (1 swimmer per sex) if they have no swimmers meeting either standard entry time.

The qualifying time standards must be obtained in Continental Championships, National Olympic Trials or International Competitions approved by FINA in the period 1 March 2011 to 3 July 2012.

FINA qualifying standards are as follows:

Men's events			Women's events		
Event	Men's OQT	Men's OST	Event	Women's OQT	Women's OST
Men's 50 metre freestyle	22.11	22.88	Women's 50 metre freestyle	25.27	26.15
Men's 100 metre freestyle	48.82	50.53	Women's 100 metre freestyle	54.57	56.48
Men's 200 metre freestyle	1:47.82	1:51.59	Women's 200 metre freestyle	1:58.33	2:02.47
Men's 400 metre freestyle	3:48.92	3:54.13	Women's 400 metre freestyle	4:09.35	4:18.07
-	–	–	Women's 800 metre freestyle	8:33.84	8:51.82
Men's 1500 metre freestyle	15:11.83	15:43.74	–	–	–
Men's 100 metre backstroke	54.40	56.30	Women's 100 metre backstroke	1:00.82	1:02.95
Men's 200 metre backstroke	1:58.48	2:02.63	Women's 200 metre backstroke	2:10.84	2:15.42
Men's 100 metre breaststroke	1:00.79	1:02.92	Women's 100 metre breaststroke	1:08.49	1:10.89
Men's 200 metre breaststroke	2:11.74	2:16.35	Women's 200 metre breaststroke	2:26.89	2:32.03
Men's 100 metre butterfly	52.36	54.19	Women's 100 metre butterfly	58.70	1:00.75
Men's 200 metre butterfly	1:56.86	2:00.95	Women's 200 metre butterfly	2:08.95	2:13.46
Men's 200 metre individual medley	2:00.17	2:04.38	Women's 200 metre individual medley	2:13.36	2:18.03
Men's 400 metre individual medley	4:16.46	4:25.44	Women's 400 metre individual medley	4:41.75	4:51.75

== Individual events ==
Only those with the Olympic Qualifying Time (OQT) are listed below as on the FINA website as those with the Olympic Selection Time are not guaranteed a place in the Olympic Games. Named swimmers have qualified personally through national selection meets or have been nominated by their National Olympic Committee (NOC).

The result is here:

- 438 – OQT (59 NF/NOCs)
- 181 – OST (12 NF/NOCs) – some still to be confirmed
- 131 – Relay-only swimmers
- 150 – Universality (95 NF/NOCs)
- Total: 900 (166 NF/NOCs)

=== Men's individual events ===
==== Men's 50 m freestyle ====
Qualification standard	No. of athletes	Qualified athletes
Olympic Qualifying Time – 22.11	2	James Magnussen (AUS); Eamon Sullivan (AUS)
Olympic Qualifying Time – 22.11	2	César Cielo (BRA); Bruno Fratus (BRA)
Olympic Qualifying Time – 22.11	2	Amaury Leveaux (FRA); Florent Manaudou (FRA)
Olympic Qualifying Time – 22.11	2	Luca Dotto (ITA); Marco Orsi (ITA)
Olympic Qualifying Time – 22.11	2	Sergey Fesikov (RUS); Andrey Grechin (RUS)
Olympic Qualifying Time – 22.11	2	Gideon Louw (RSA); Roland Schoeman (RSA)
Olympic Qualifying Time – 22.11	2	Cullen Jones (USA); Anthony Ervin (USA)
Olympic Qualifying Time – 22.11	1	Adam Brown (GBR)
Olympic Qualifying Time – 22.11	1	Ioannis Kalargaris (GRE)
Olympic Qualifying Time – 22.11	1	Krisztián Takács (HUN)
Olympic Qualifying Time – 22.11	1	Stefan Nystrand (SWE)
Olympic Qualifying Time – 22.11	1	George Bovell (TRI)
Olympic Qualifying Time – 22.11	1	Andrii Govorov (UKR)
Olympic Selection Time – 22.88	15	Hanser García (CUB)^{[a]} Brent Hayden (CAN)^{[a]} Ari-Pekka Liukkonen (FIN); Norbert Trandafir (ROU); David Dunford (KEN); Brett Fraser (CAY)^{[a]} Jasper Aerents (BEL); Kacper Majchrzak (POL); Federico Grabich (ARG); Mario Todorović (CRO); Shi Yang (CHN); Árni Már Árnason (ISL); Roy-Allan Burch (BER)^{[b]} Barry Murphy (IRL)^{[a]} Shehab Younis (EGY)^{[b]}
Wildcard places	24	Ching Maou Wei (ASA); Mahfizur Rahman Sagor (BAN); Wilfried Tevoedjre (BEN); Adama Ouedraogo (BUR); Ponloeu Hemthon (CAM); Christian Nassif (CAF); Emile Rony Bakale (CGO); Kouassi Brou (CIV); Paul Edingue Ekane (CMR); Zachary Payne (COK); Abdourahman Osman (DJI); Mulualem Girma Teshale (ETH); Kerson Hadley (FSM); Kareem Ennab (JOR); Phathana Inthavong (LAO); Giordan Harris (MHL); Chakyl Camal (MOZ); Prasiddha Jung Shah (NEP); Jackson Niyomugabo (RWA); Mohamed Elkhedr (SUD); Luke Hall (SWZ); Ganzi Mugula (UGA); Tolga Akcayli (VIN)
Total	59	

==== Men's 100 m freestyle ====
Qualification standard	No. of athletes	Qualified athletes
Olympic Qualifying Time – 48.82	2	James Magnussen (AUS); James Roberts (AUS)
Olympic Qualifying Time – 48.82	2	César Cielo (BRA); Nicolas Oliveira (BRA)
Olympic Qualifying Time – 48.82	2	Brett Fraser (CAY); Shaune Fraser (CAY)
Olympic Qualifying Time – 48.82	2	Yannick Agnel (FRA); Fabien Gilot (FRA)
Olympic Qualifying Time – 48.82	2	Luca Dotto (ITA); Filippo Magnini (ITA)
Olympic Qualifying Time – 48.82	2	Danila Izotov (RUS); Nikita Lobintsev (RUS)
Olympic Qualifying Time – 48.82	2	Gideon Louw (RSA); Graeme Moore (RSA)
Olympic Qualifying Time – 48.82	2	Nathan Adrian (USA); Cullen Jones (USA)
Olympic Qualifying Time – 48.82	1	Brent Hayden (CAN)
Olympic Qualifying Time – 48.82	1	Hanser García (CUB)
Olympic Qualifying Time – 48.82	1	Marco di Carli (GER)
Olympic Qualifying Time – 48.82	1	Sebastiaan Verschuren (NED)
Olympic Qualifying Time – 48.82	1	Konrad Czerniak (POL)
Olympic Selection Time – 50.53	18	Stefan Nystrand (SWE)^{[a]} Pieter Timmers (BEL); Adam Brown (GBR)^{[a]} Norbert Trandafir (ROU); Dominik Kozma (HUN)^{[a]} Lü Zhiwu (CHN); David Dunford (KEN); Martin Verner (CZE); Mindaugas Sadauskas (LTU); Kristian Golomeev (GRE); Dominik Meichtry (SUI)^{[a]} Yauhen Tsurkin (BLR); Kemal Arda Gürdal (TUR); Nabil Kebbab (ALG)^{[b]} Benjamin Hockin (PAR)^{[a]} George Bovell (TRI)^{[a]} Uvis Kalniņš (LAT)^{[b]} Gabriel Melconian (URU)^{[b]}
Wildcard places	21	Sidni Hoxha (ALB); Mikael Koloyan (ARM); Jemal Le Grand (ARU); Andrew Rutherfurd (BOL); Beni Binobagira (BDI); Paul Elaisa (FIJ); Esau Simpson (GRN); Chris Duenas (GUM); Kevin Avila (GUA); Niall Roberts (GUY); Mohammad Bidarian (IRI); Ahmed Husam (MDV); Mamadou Soumare (MLI); Tamir Andryei (MGL); Omar Núñez (NCA); Israr Hussain (PAK); Ammaar Ghadiyali (TAN); Sergeý Krowýakow (TKM); Branden Whitehurst (ISV)
Total	60	

==== Men's 200 m freestyle ====
Qualification standard	No. of athletes	Qualified athletes
Olympic Qualifying Time – 1:47.82	2	Thomas Fraser-Holmes (AUS); Kenrick Monk (AUS)
Olympic Qualifying Time – 1:47.82	2	Brett Fraser (CAY); Shaune Fraser (CAY)
Olympic Qualifying Time – 1:47.82	2	Li Yunqi (CHN); Sun Yang (CHN)
Olympic Qualifying Time – 1:47.82	2	Yannick Agnel (FRA); Grégory Mallet (FRA)
Olympic Qualifying Time – 1:47.82	2	Ieuan Lloyd (GBR); Robert Renwick (GBR)
Olympic Qualifying Time – 1:47.82	2	Paul Biedermann (GER); Clemens Rapp (GER)
Olympic Qualifying Time – 1:47.82	2	Dion Dreesens (NED); Sebastiaan Verschuren (NED)
Olympic Qualifying Time – 1:47.82	2	Danila Izotov (RUS); Artem Lobuzov (RUS)
Olympic Qualifying Time – 1:47.82	2	Ricky Berens (USA); Ryan Lochte (USA)
Olympic Qualifying Time – 1:47.82	1	Dominik Kozma (HUN)
Olympic Qualifying Time – 1:47.82	1	Park Tae-Hwan (KOR)
Olympic Qualifying Time – 1:47.82	1	Matthew Stanley (NZL)
Olympic Qualifying Time – 1:47.82	1	Benjamin Hockin (PAR)
Olympic Qualifying Time – 1:47.82	1	Dominik Meichtry (SUI)
Olympic Selection Time – 1:51.59	12	Marco Belotti (ITA); Nimrod Shapira Bar-Or (ISR); Cristian Quintero (VEN); Blake Worsley (CAN); Ahmed Mathlouthi (TUN); David Brandl (AUT); Glenn Surgeloose (BEL); Mads Glaesner (DEN)^{[a]} Tiago Venâncio (POR); Radovan Siljevski (SRB); Matias Koski (FIN)^{[a]} Sebastian Jahnsen Madico (PER)
Wildcard Places	6	Anderson Lim (BRU); Mario Montoya (CRC); Nicholas Schwab (DOM); Mathieu Marquet (MRI); Jessie Lacuna (PHI); Raúl Martínez Colomer (PUR)
Total	41	

==== Men's 400 m freestyle ====
Qualification standard	No. of athletes	Qualified athletes
Olympic Qualifying Time – 3:48.93	2	David McKeon (AUS); Ryan Napoleon (AUS)
Olympic Qualifying Time – 3:48.93	2	Hao Yun (CHN); Sun Yang (CHN)
Olympic Qualifying Time – 3:48.93	2	Robert Renwick (GBR); David Carry (GBR)
Olympic Qualifying Time – 3:48.93	2	Peter Vanderkaay (USA); Conor Dwyer (USA)
Olympic Qualifying Time – 3:48.93	2	Mads Glæsner (DEN); Pál Joensen (DEN)
Olympic Qualifying Time – 3:48.93	1	Ryan Cochrane (CAN)
Olympic Qualifying Time – 3:48.93	1	Paul Biedermann (GER)
Olympic Qualifying Time – 3:48.93	1	Gergő Kis (HUN)
Olympic Qualifying Time – 3:48.93	1	Samuel Pizzetti (ITA)
Olympic Qualifying Time – 3:48.93	1	Park Tae-Hwan (KOR)
Olympic Qualifying Time – 3:48.93	1	Matthew Stanley (NZL)
Olympic Qualifying Time – 3:48.93	1	Heerden Herman (RSA)
Olympic Selection Time – 3:54.13	9	Egor Degtyarev (RUS); Dominik Meichtry (SUI)^{[a]} Sergiy Frolov (UKR)^{[a]} Juan Martín Pereyra (ARG); Cristian Quintero (VEN); Matias Koski (FIN)^{[a]} Đorđe Marković (SRB); Mateusz Sawrymowicz (POL)^{[a]} Mateo de Angulo (COL)
Wildcard Places	2	Allan Gutierrez Castro (HON); Ahmed Gebrel (PLE)
Total	28	

==== Men's 1500 m freestyle ====
Qualification standard	No. of athletes	Qualified athletes
Olympic Qualifying Time – 15:11.83	2	Dai Jun (CHN); Sun Yang (CHN)
Olympic Qualifying Time – 15:11.83	2	Damien Joly (FRA); Anthony Pannier (FRA)
Olympic Qualifying Time – 15:11.83	2	Daniel Fogg (GBR); David Davies (GBR)
Olympic Qualifying Time – 15:11.83	2	Gergő Kis (HUN); Gergely Gyurta (HUN)
Olympic Qualifying Time – 15:11.83	2	Gabriele Detti (ITA); Gregorio Paltrinieri (ITA)
Olympic Qualifying Time – 15:11.83	2	Andrew Gemmell (USA); Connor Jaeger (USA)
Olympic Qualifying Time – 15:11.83	1	Ryan Cochrane (CAN)
Olympic Qualifying Time – 15:11.83	1	Pál Joensen (DEN)
Olympic Qualifying Time – 15:11.83	1	Matias Koski (FIN)
Olympic Qualifying Time – 15:11.83	1	Job Kienhuis (NED)
Olympic Qualifying Time – 15:11.83	1	Mateusz Sawrymowicz (POL)
Olympic Qualifying Time – 15:11.83	1	Heerdan Herman (RSA)
Olympic Qualifying Time – 15:11.83	1	Park Tae-Hwan (KOR)
Olympic Qualifying Time – 15:11.83	1	Oussama Mellouli (TUN)
Olympic Qualifying Time – 15:11.83	1	Sergiy Frolov (UKR)
Olympic Selection Time – 15:43.74	9	Jarrod Poort (AUS); Juan Martín Pereyra (ARG); Alejandro Gómez (VEN); Arturo Pérez Vertti (MEX); Ediz Yildirimer (TUR); Ventsislav Aydarski (BUL); Anton Sveinn McKee (ISL); Uladzimir Zhyharau (BLR); Jan Micka (CZE)
Wildcard Places	1	Ullalmath Gagan (IND)
Total	31	

==== Men's 100 m backstroke ====
Qualification standard	No. of athletes	Qualified athletes
Olympic Qualifying Time – 54.40	2	Hayden Stoeckel (AUS); Daniel Arnamnart (AUS)
Olympic Qualifying Time – 54.40	2	Daniel Orzechowski (BRA); Thiago Pereira (BRA)
Olympic Qualifying Time – 54.40	2	Cheng Feiyi (CHN); He Jianbin (CHN)
Olympic Qualifying Time – 54.40	2	Camille Lacourt (FRA); Benjamin Stasiulis (FRA)
Olympic Qualifying Time – 54.40	2	Jan-Philip Glania (GER); Helge Meeuw (GER)
Olympic Qualifying Time – 54.40	2	Nick Driebergen (NED); Bastiaan Lijesen (NED)
Olympic Qualifying Time – 54.40	2	Gareth Kean (NZL); Daniel Bell (NZL)
Olympic Qualifying Time – 54.40	2	Arkady Vyatchanin (RUS); Vladimir Morozov (RUS)
Olympic Qualifying Time – 54.40	2	Aschwin Wildeboer (ESP); Juan Miguel Rando (ESP)
Olympic Qualifying Time – 54.40	2	Matt Grevers (USA); Nick Thoman (USA)
Olympic Qualifying Time – 54.40	1	Charles Francis (CAN)
Olympic Qualifying Time – 54.40	1	Liam Tancock (GBR)
Olympic Qualifying Time – 54.40	1	Aristeidis Grigoriadis (GRE)
Olympic Qualifying Time – 54.40	1	Richárd Bohus (HUN)
Olympic Qualifying Time – 54.40	1	Yakov-Yan Toumarkin (ISR)
Olympic Qualifying Time – 54.40	1	Mirco Di Tora (ITA)
Olympic Qualifying Time – 54.40	1	Ryosuke Irie (JPN)
Olympic Qualifying Time – 54.40	1	Marcin Tarczyński (POL)
Olympic Qualifying Time – 54.40	1	Charl Crous (RSA)
Olympic Selection Time – 56.30	12	Mathias Gydesen (DEN); Chris Walker-Hebborn (GBR)*; Pavel Sankovich (BLR); Lavrans Solli (NOR); Alexandr Tarabrin (KAZ); Omar Pinzón (COL)^{[a]} Federico Grabich (ARG); I Gede Siman Sudartawa (INA); Oleksandr Isakov (UKR); Park Seon-Kwan (KOR); Pedro Medel (CUB); George Bovell (TRI)^{[a]} Bradley Ally (BAR)^{[a]}
Wildcard Places	2	Heshan Unamboowe (SRI); Zane Jordan (ZAM)
Total	43	

* Chris Walker-Hebborn qualified in this event by an allocated quota, following a sudden withdrawal of Israel's Jonatan Kopelev.

==== Men's 200 m backstroke ====
Qualification standard	No. of athletes	Qualified athletes
Olympic Qualifying Time – 1:58.48	2	Mitch Larkin (AUS); Matson Lawson (AUS)
Olympic Qualifying Time – 1:58.48	2	Xu Jiayu (CHN); Zhang Fenglin (CHN)
Olympic Qualifying Time – 1:58.48	2	Jan-Philip Glania (GER); Yannick Lebherz (GER)
Olympic Qualifying Time – 1:58.48	2	Marco Loughran (GBR); Christopher Walker-Hebborn (GBR)
Olympic Qualifying Time – 1:58.48	2	Gábor Balog (HUN); Péter Bernek (HUN)
Olympic Qualifying Time – 1:58.48	2	Ryosuke Irie (JPN); Kazuki Watanabe (JPN)
Olympic Qualifying Time – 1:58.48	2	Ryan Lochte (USA); Tyler Clary (USA)
Olympic Qualifying Time – 1:58.48	2	Arkady Vyatchanin (RUS); Anton Anchin (RUS)
Olympic Qualifying Time – 1:58.48	1	Leonardo de Deus (BRA)
Olympic Qualifying Time – 1:58.48	1	Tobias Oriwol (CAN)
Olympic Qualifying Time – 1:58.48	1	Omar Pinzón (COL)
Olympic Qualifying Time – 1:58.48	1	Benjamin Stasiulis (FRA)
Olympic Qualifying Time – 1:58.48	1	Yakov-Yan Toumarkin (ISR)
Olympic Qualifying Time – 1:58.48	1	Sebastiano Ranfagni (ITA)
Olympic Qualifying Time – 1:58.48	1	Nick Driebergen (NED)
Olympic Qualifying Time – 1:58.48	1	Gareth Kean (NZL)
Olympic Qualifying Time – 1:58.48	1	Radosław Kawęcki (POL)
Olympic Selection Time – 2:02.63	10	Darren Murray (RSA); Aschwin Wildeboer (ESP)^{[a]} Oleksandr Isakov (UKR); Pedro Oliveira (POR); Pedro Medel (CUB); Park Hyung-Joo (KOR); Alexandr Tarabrin (KAZ); Sebastian Stoss (AUT); Derya Büyükuncu (TUR); Quah Zheng Wen (SIN)
Total	35	

==== Men's 100 m breaststroke ====
Qualification standard	No. of athletes	Qualified athletes
Olympic Qualifying Time – 1:00.79	2	Christian Sprenger (AUS); Brenton Rickard (AUS)
Olympic Qualifying Time – 1:00.79	2	Felipe Lima (BRA); Felipe França Silva (BRA)
Olympic Qualifying Time – 1:00.79	2	Hendrik Feldwehr (GER); Christian vom Lehn (GER)
Olympic Qualifying Time – 1:00.79	2	Craig Benson (GBR); Michael Jamieson (GBR)
Olympic Qualifying Time – 1:00.79	2	Mattia Pesce (ITA); Fabio Scozzoli (ITA)
Olympic Qualifying Time – 1:00.79	2	Kosuke Kitajima (JPN); Ryo Tateishi (JPN)
Olympic Qualifying Time – 1:00.79	2	Brendan Hansen (USA); Eric Shanteau (USA)
Olympic Qualifying Time – 1:00.79	1	Scott Dickens (CAN)
Olympic Qualifying Time – 1:00.79	1	Dániel Gyurta (HUN)
Olympic Qualifying Time – 1:00.79	1	Barry Murphy (IRL)
Olympic Qualifying Time – 1:00.79	1	Giedrius Titenis (LTU)
Olympic Qualifying Time – 1:00.79	1	Lennart Stekelenburg (NED)
Olympic Qualifying Time – 1:00.79	1	Glenn Snyders (NZL)
Olympic Qualifying Time – 1:00.79	1	Roman Sloudnov (RUS)
Olympic Qualifying Time – 1:00.79	1	Damir Dugonjič (SLO)
Olympic Qualifying Time – 1:00.79	1	Cameron van der Burgh (RSA)
Olympic Qualifying Time – 1:00.79	1	Valeriy Dymo (UKR)
Olympic Selection Time – 1:02.92	15	Giacomo Perez d'Ortona (FRA)^{[a]} Imri Ganiel (ISR); Li Xiayan (CHN); Panagiotis Samilidis (GRE)^{[a]} Dawid Szulich (POL); Carlos Almeida (POR); Dragos Agache (ROU); Martin Liivamägi (EST); Vlad Polyakov (KAZ); Jakob Jóhann Sveinsson (ISL); Laurent Carnol (LUX)^{[a]} Čaba Silađi (SRB); Édgar Crespo (PAN)^{[b]} Danila Artiomov (MDA)^{[b]} Malick Fall (SEN)^{[b]}
Wildcard Places	5	Wael Koubrousli (LIB); Diguan Pigot (SUR); Azad Al-Barazi (SYR); Amini Fonua (TGA); Mubarak Al-Besher (UAE)
Total	44	

==== Men's 200 m breaststroke ====
Qualification standard	No. of athletes	Qualified athletes
Olympic Qualifying Time – 2:11.74	2	Tales Cerdeira (BRA); Henrique Barbosa (BRA)
Olympic Qualifying Time – 2:11.74	2	Marco Koch (GER); Christian vom Lehn (GER)
Olympic Qualifying Time – 2:11.74	2	Andrew Willis (GBR); Michael Jamieson (GBR)
Olympic Qualifying Time – 2:11.74	2	Kosuke Kitajima (JPN); Ryo Tateishi (JPN)
Olympic Qualifying Time – 2:11.74	2	Scott Weltz (USA); Clark Burckle (USA)
Olympic Qualifying Time – 2:11.74	2	Dániel Gyurta (HUN); Ákos Molnár (HUN)
Olympic Qualifying Time – 2:11.74	1	Brenton Rickard (AUS)
Olympic Qualifying Time – 2:11.74	1	Panagiotis Samilidis (GRE)
Olympic Qualifying Time – 2:11.74	1	Choi Kyu-Woong (KOR)
Olympic Qualifying Time – 2:11.74	1	Giedrius Titenis (LTU)
Olympic Qualifying Time – 2:11.74	1	Laurent Carnol (LUX)
Olympic Qualifying Time – 2:11.74	1	Lennart Stekelenburg (NED)
Olympic Qualifying Time – 2:11.74	1	Glenn Snyders (NZL)
Olympic Qualifying Time – 2:11.74	1	Vyacheslav Sinkevich (RUS)
Olympic Qualifying Time – 2:11.74	1	Igor Borysik (UKR)
Olympic Selection Time – 2:16.35	11	Chen Cheng (CHN); Yannick Kaeser (SUI); Matti Mattsson (FIN); Scott Dickens (CAN)^{[a]} Sławomir Kuczko (POL); Christian Schurr (MEX); Nuttapong Ketin (THA); Tomáš Klobučník (SVK); Hunor Mate (AUT); Jakob Jóhann Sveinsson (ISL); Irakli Bolkvadze (GEO)^{[b]}
Wildcard Places	2	Dmitrii Aleksandrov (KGZ); Tsilavina Ramanantsoa (MAD)
Total	34	

==== Men's 100 m butterfly ====
Qualification standard	No. of athletes	Qualified athletes
Olympic Qualifying Time – 52.36	2	Chris Wright (AUS); Jayden Hadler (AUS)
Olympic Qualifying Time – 52.36	2	Steffen Deibler (GER); Benjamin Starke (GER)
Olympic Qualifying Time – 52.36	2	Antony James (GBR); Michael Rock (GBR)
Olympic Qualifying Time – 52.36	2	Takuro Fujii (JPN); Takeshi Matsuda (JPN)
Olympic Qualifying Time – 52.36	2	Yevgeny Korotyshkin (RUS); Nikolay Skvortsov (RUS)
Olympic Qualifying Time – 52.36	2	Milorad Čavić (SRB); Ivan Lendjer (SRB)
Olympic Qualifying Time – 52.36	2	Michael Phelps (USA); Tyler McGill (USA)
Olympic Qualifying Time – 52.36	1	François Heersbrandt (BEL)
Olympic Qualifying Time – 52.36	1	Kaio Almeida (BRA); ~~Glauber Silva (BRA)~~
Olympic Qualifying Time – 52.36	1	Zhou Jiawei (CHN)
Olympic Qualifying Time – 52.36	1	Jason Dunford (KEN)
Olympic Qualifying Time – 52.36	1	Joeri Verlinden (NED)
Olympic Qualifying Time – 52.36	1	Konrad Czerniak (POL)
Olympic Qualifying Time – 52.36	1	Chad le Clos (RSA)
Olympic Qualifying Time – 52.36	1	Lars Frölander (SWE)
Olympic Selection Time – 54.19	18	Albert Subirats (VEN); Matteo Rivolta (ITA); Chang Gyu-Cheol (KOR); Peter Mankoč (SLO); Clément Lefert (FRA); Bence Pulai (HUN); Ryan Pini (PNG)^{[b]} Dinko Jukić (AUT)^{[a]} Joe Bartoch (CAN); Simão Morgado (POR); Shaune Fraser (CAY)^{[a]} Pavel Sankovich (BLR); Benjamin Hockin (PAR)^{[a]} Joseph Schooling (SIN)^{[a]} Vytautas Janusaitis (LTU)^{[a]} Stefanos Dimitriadis (GRE)^{[a]} Dominik Meichtry (SUI)^{[a]} Daniel Bell (NZL)^{[a]}
Wildcard Places	4	Yevgeniy Lazuka (AZE); Khalid Baba (BRN); Mohanad Al-Azzawi (IRQ); Sofyan El Gadi (LBA)
Total	44	

==== Men's 200 m butterfly ====
Qualification standard	No. of athletes	Qualified athletes
Olympic Qualifying Time – 1:56.85	2	Nick D'Arcy (AUS); Chris Wright (AUS)
Olympic Qualifying Time – 1:56.85	2	Leonardo de Deus (BRA); Kaio Almeida (BRA)
Olympic Qualifying Time – 1:56.85	2	Chen Yin (CHN); Wu Peng (CHN)
Olympic Qualifying Time – 1:56.85	2	Joseph Roebuck (GBR); Roberto Pavoni (GBR)
Olympic Qualifying Time – 1:56.85	2	Ioannis Drymonakos (GRE); Stefanos Dimitriadis (GRE)
Olympic Qualifying Time – 1:56.85	2	Bence Biczó (HUN); László Cseh (HUN)
Olympic Qualifying Time – 1:56.85	2	Kazuya Kaneda (JPN); Takeshi Matsuda (JPN)
Olympic Qualifying Time – 1:56.85	2	Marcin Cieślak (POL); Paweł Korzeniowski (POL)
Olympic Qualifying Time – 1:56.85	2	Michael Phelps (USA); Tyler Clary (USA)
Olympic Qualifying Time – 1:56.85	1	Dinko Jukić (AUT)
Olympic Qualifying Time – 1:56.85	1	Nikolay Skvortsov (RUS)
Olympic Qualifying Time – 1:56.85	1	Velimir Stjepanović (SRB)
Olympic Qualifying Time – 1:56.85	1	Joseph Schooling (SIN)
Olympic Qualifying Time – 1:56.85	1	Chad le Clos (RSA)
Olympic Selection Time – 2:00.95	13	Robert Žbogar (SLO); Alexandre Liess (SUI); Alexandru Coci (ROU); Pedro Oliveira (POR); David Sharpe (CAN); Illya Chuyev (UKR); Hsu Chi-Chieh (TPE); Marcos Lavado (VEN); Mauricio Fiol (PER); Gal Nevo (ISR)^{[a]} Yousef Al-Askari (KUW)^{[b]} Omar Pinzón (COL)^{[a]} Diego Castillo (PAN)
Wildcard Places	1	Hocine Haciane (AND)
Total	37	

==== Men's 200 m individual medley ====
Qualification standard	No. of athletes	Qualified athletes
Olympic Qualifying Time – 2:00.17	2	Daniel Tranter (AUS); Jayden Hadler (AUS)
Olympic Qualifying Time – 2:00.17	2	Henrique Rodrigues (BRA); Thiago Pereira (BRA)
Olympic Qualifying Time – 2:00.17	2	Wang Shun (CHN); Wu Peng (CHN)
Olympic Qualifying Time – 2:00.17	2	Markus Deibler (GER); Philip Heintz (GER)
Olympic Qualifying Time – 2:00.17	2	James Goddard (GBR); Joseph Roebuck (GBR)
Olympic Qualifying Time – 2:00.17	2	László Cseh (HUN); Dávid Verrasztó (HUN)
Olympic Qualifying Time – 2:00.17	2	Kosuke Hagino (JPN); Ken Takakuwa (JPN)
Olympic Qualifying Time – 2:00.17	2	Chad le Clos (RSA); Darian Townsend (RSA)
Olympic Qualifying Time – 2:00.17	2	Michael Phelps (USA); Ryan Lochte (USA)
Olympic Qualifying Time – 2:00.17	1	Markus Rogan (AUT)
Olympic Qualifying Time – 2:00.17	1	Bradley Ally (BAR)
Olympic Qualifying Time – 2:00.17	1	Gal Nevo (ISR)
Olympic Qualifying Time – 2:00.17	1	Federico Turrini (ITA)
Olympic Qualifying Time – 2:00.17	1	Vytautas Janušaitis (LTU)
Olympic Qualifying Time – 2:00.17	1	Marcin Cieślak (POL)
Olympic Qualifying Time – 2:00.17	1	Diogo Carvalho (POR)
Olympic Qualifying Time – 2:00.17	1	Aleksandr Tikhonov (RUS)
Olympic Selection Time – 2:04.38	9	Raphaël Stacchiotti (LUX); Andrew Ford (CAN); Taki Mrabet (TUN); Martin Liivamägi (EST); Andreas Vazaios (GRE); David Karasek (SUI); Maksym Shemberev (UKR); Jung Won-Yong (KOR); Nuttapong Ketin (THA)
Wildcard Places	1	Ensar Hajder (BIH)
Total	36	

==== Men's 400 m individual medley ====
Qualification standard	No. of athletes	Qualified athletes
Olympic Qualifying Time – 4:16.46	2	Thomas Fraser-Holmes (AUS); Daniel Tranter (AUS)
Olympic Qualifying Time – 4:16.46	2	Wang Chengxiang (CHN); Yang Zhixian (CHN)
Olympic Qualifying Time – 4:16.46	2	Joseph Roebuck (GBR); Roberto Pavoni (GBR)
Olympic Qualifying Time – 4:16.46	2	László Cseh (HUN); Dávid Verrasztó (HUN)
Olympic Qualifying Time – 4:16.46	2	Luca Marin (ITA); Federico Turrini (ITA)
Olympic Qualifying Time – 4:16.46	2	Kosuke Hagino (JPN); Yuya Horihata (JPN)
Olympic Qualifying Time – 4:16.46	2	Chad le Clos (RSA); Riaan Schoeman (RSA)
Olympic Qualifying Time – 4:16.46	2	Ryan Lochte (USA); Michael Phelps (USA)
Olympic Qualifying Time – 4:16.46	1	Thiago Pereira (BRA)
Olympic Qualifying Time – 4:16.46	1	Yannick Lebherz (GER)
Olympic Qualifying Time – 4:16.46	1	Ioannis Drymonakos (GRE)
Olympic Qualifying Time – 4:16.46	1	Alexander Tikhonov (RUS)
Olympic Qualifying Time – 4:16.46	1	Gal Nevo (ISR)
Olympic Qualifying Time – 4:16.46	1	Maksym Shemberev (UKR)
Olympic Selection Time – 4:25.44	12	Alec Page (CAN); Taki Mrabet (TUN); Ward Bauwens (BEL); Diogo Carvalho (POR)^{[a]} Jung Won-Yong (KOR); Raphaël Stacchiotti (LUX); Yury Suvorau (BLR); Quah Zheng Wen (SIN); Esteban Enderica Salgado (ECU)^{[b]} Pedro Pinotes (ANG)^{[b]} Anton Sveinn McKee (ISL); Bradley Ally (BAR)^{[a]}
Wildcard Places	3	Rafael Alfaro (ESA); Marko Blazevski (MKD); Ahmed Atari (QAT)
Total	37	

* to be confirmed by NF/NOC

=== Women's individual events ===
==== Women's 50 m freestyle ====
Qualification standard	No. of athletes	Qualified athletes
Olympic Qualifying Time – 25.27	2	Cate Campbell (AUS); Bronte Campbell (AUS)
Olympic Qualifying Time – 25.27	2	Aliaksandra Herasimenia (BLR); Sviatlana Khakhlova (BLR)
Olympic Qualifying Time – 25.27	2	Jeanette Ottesen (DEN); Pernille Blume (DEN)
Olympic Qualifying Time – 25.27	2	Amy Smith (GBR); Francesca Halsall (GBR)
Olympic Qualifying Time – 25.27	2	Nery Mantey Niangkouara (GRE); Theodora Drakou (GRE)
Olympic Qualifying Time – 25.27	2	Marleen Veldhuis (NED); Ranomi Kromowidjojo (NED)
Olympic Qualifying Time – 25.27	2	Therese Alshammar (SWE); Sarah Sjöström (SWE)
Olympic Qualifying Time – 25.27	2	Jessica Hardy (USA); Kara Lynn Joyce (USA)
Olympic Qualifying Time – 25.27	1	Arianna Vanderpool-Wallace (BAH)
Olympic Qualifying Time – 25.27	1	Graciele Herrmann (BRA)
Olympic Qualifying Time – 25.27	1	Victoria Poon (CAN)
Olympic Qualifying Time – 25.27	1	Anna Santamans (FRA)
Olympic Qualifying Time – 25.27	1	Britta Steffen (GER)
Olympic Qualifying Time – 25.27	1	Sarah Blake Bateman (ISL)
Olympic Qualifying Time – 25.27	1	Yayoi Matsumoto (JPN)
Olympic Qualifying Time – 25.27	1	Burcu Dolunay (TUR)
Olympic Qualifying Time – 25.27	1	Darya Stepanyuk (UKR)
Olympic Qualifying Time – 25.27	1	Anna Dowgiert (POL)
Olympic Qualifying Time – 25.27	1	Triin Aljand (EST)
Olympic Qualifying Time – 25.27	1	Hayley Palmer (NZL)
Olympic Qualifying Time – 25.27	1	Arlene Semeco (VEN)
Olympic Selection Time – 26.15	12	Vanessa García (PUR); Trudi Maree (RSA); Jolien Sysmans (BEL); Eszter Dara (HUN); Hanna-Maria Seppälä (FIN); Zhu Qianwei (CHN); Erika Ferraioli (ITA); Miroslava Syllabová (SVK); Miroslava Najdanovski (SRB); Farida Osman (EGY)^{[b]} Alia Atkinson (JAM)^{[a]} Rūta Meilutytė (LTU)^{[a]} Chinyere Pigot (SUR)^{[b]}
Wildcard places	31	Mariana Henriques (ANG); Karin Clashing (ANT); Sara Al Flaij (BRN); Angelika Ouedraogo (BUR); Elsie Uwamahoro (BDI); Vitiny Hemthon (CAM); Antoinette Guedia Mouafo (CMR); Aminata Aboubakar Yacoub (CGO); Celeste Brown (COK); Assita Toure (CIV); Yanet Seyoum (ETH); Talita Baqlah (JOR); Faye Sultan (KUW); Gabriela Ņikitina (LAT); Masempe Theko (LES); Joyce Tafatatha (MAW); Aminath Shajan (MDV); Fatoumata Samassékou (MLI); Nicola Muscat (MLT); Ann-Marie Hepler (MHL); Jessica Teixeira Vieira (MOZ); Nafissatou Moussa Adamou (NIG); Keesha Keane (PLW); Sabine Hazboun (PLE); Judith Meauri (PNG); Nada Arkaji (QAT); Alphonsine Agahozo (RWA); Mhasin El Nour Fadlalla (SUD); Katerina Izmaylova (TJK); Adzo Rebecca Kpossi (TOG); Jamila Lunkuse (UGA)
Total	72	

==== Women's 100 m freestyle ====
Qualification standard	No. of athletes	Qualified athletes
Olympic Qualifying Time – 54.57	2	Melanie Schlanger (AUS); Cate Campbell (AUS)
Olympic Qualifying Time – 54.57	2	Jeanette Ottesen (DEN); Pernille Blume (DEN)
Olympic Qualifying Time – 54.57	2	Britta Steffen (GER); Daniela Schreiber (GER)
Olympic Qualifying Time – 54.57	2	Amy Smith (GBR); Francesca Halsall (GBR)
Olympic Qualifying Time – 54.57	2	Femke Heemskerk (NED); Ranomi Kromowidjojo (NED)
Olympic Qualifying Time – 54.57	2	Sarah Sjöström (SWE); Therese Alshammar (SWE)
Olympic Qualifying Time – 54.57	2	Jessica Hardy (USA); Missy Franklin (USA)
Olympic Qualifying Time – 54.57	1	Arianna Vanderpool-Wallace (BAH)
Olympic Qualifying Time – 54.57	1	Aliaksandra Herasimenia (BLR)
Olympic Qualifying Time – 54.57	1	Tang Yi (CHN)
Olympic Qualifying Time – 54.57	1	Haruka Ueda (JPN)
Olympic Qualifying Time – 54.57	1	Veronika Popova (RUS)
Olympic Selection Time – 56.48	16	Julia Wilkinson (CAN)^{[a]} Hannah Wilson (HKG); Charlotte Bonnet (FRA)^{[a]} Hanna-Maria Seppälä (FIN); Nery Mantey Niangkouara (GRE)^{[a]} Burcu Dolunay (TUR)^{[a]} Darya Stepanyuk (UKR)^{[a]} Katarzyna Wilk (POL); Daynara de Paula (BRA)^{[a]} Nina Rangelova (BUL); Rūta Meilutytė (LTU)^{[a]} Miroslava Najdanovski (SRB); Katarína Filová (SVK); Eszter Dara (HUN); Liliana Ibáñez (MEX); Nastja Govejšek (SLO)
Wildcard places	16	Megan Fonteno (ASA); Karen Torrez (BOL); Sihame Ayouba Ali (COM); Brittany van Lange (GUY); Estellah Fils Rabetsara (MAD); Debra Daniel (FSM); Shreya Dhital (NEP); Karen Riveros (PAR); Jasmine Alkhaldi (PHI); Clelia Tini (SMR); Mareme Faye (SEN); Mylene Ong (SIN); Reshika Udugampola (SRI); Bayan Jumah (SYR); Magdalena Moshi (TAN); Jade Ashleigh Howard (ZAM)
Total	51	

==== Women's 200 m freestyle ====
Qualification standard	No. of athletes	Qualified athletes
Olympic Qualifying Time – 1:58.33	2	Bronte Barratt (AUS); Kylie Palmer (AUS)
Olympic Qualifying Time – 1:58.33	2	Song Wenyan (CHN); Wang Shijia (CHN)
Olympic Qualifying Time – 1:58.33	2	Camille Muffat (FRA); Ophélie-Cyrielle Étienne (FRA)
Olympic Qualifying Time – 1:58.33	2	Rebecca Turner (GBR); Caitlin McClatchey (GBR)
Olympic Qualifying Time – 1:58.33	2	Zsuzsanna Jakabos (HUN); Ágnes Mutina (HUN)
Olympic Qualifying Time – 1:58.33	2	Allison Schmitt (USA); Missy Franklin (USA)
Olympic Qualifying Time – 1:58.33	2	Barbara Jardin (CAN); Samantha Cheverton (CAN)
Olympic Qualifying Time – 1:58.33	1	Melania Costa (ESP)
Olympic Qualifying Time – 1:58.33	1	Silke Lippok (GER)
Olympic Qualifying Time – 1:58.33	1	Federica Pellegrini (ITA)
Olympic Qualifying Time – 1:58.33	1	Hanae Ito (JPN)
Olympic Qualifying Time – 1:58.33	1	Femke Heemskerk (NED)
Olympic Qualifying Time – 1:58.33	1	Lauren Boyle (NZL)
Olympic Qualifying Time – 1:58.33	1	Veronika Popova (RUS)
Olympic Qualifying Time – 1:58.33	1	Sara Isaković (SLO)
Olympic Qualifying Time – 1:58.33	1	Sarah Sjöström (SWE)
Olympic Selection Time – 2:02.47	13	Karin Prinsloo (RSA)^{[a]} Nina Rangelova (BUL); Sze Hang Yu (HKG); Jördis Steinegger (AUT)^{[a]} Gráinne Murphy (IRL)^{[a]} Camelia Potec (ROU)^{[a]} Liliana Ibáñez (MEX); Hanna-Maria Seppälä (FIN); Anna Stylianou (CYP); Katarína Filová (SVK); Baek Il-Joo (KOR); Danielle Villars (SUI); Natthanan Junkrajang (THA)
Wildcard places	2	Heather Arseth (MRI); Aurélie Fanchette (SEY)
Total	38	

==== Women's 400 m freestyle ====
Qualification standard	No. of athletes	Qualified athletes
Olympic Qualifying Time – 4:09.35	2	Kylie Palmer (AUS); Bronte Barratt (AUS)
Olympic Qualifying Time – 4:09.35	2	Brittany MacLean (CAN); Savannah King (CAN)
Olympic Qualifying Time – 4:09.35	2	Li Xuanxu (CHN); Shao Yiwen (CHN)
Olympic Qualifying Time – 4:09.35	2	Camille Muffat (FRA); Coralie Balmy (FRA)
Olympic Qualifying Time – 4:09.35	2	Joanne Jackson (GBR); Rebecca Adlington (GBR)
Olympic Qualifying Time – 4:09.35	2	Boglárka Kapás (HUN); Éva Risztov (HUN)
Olympic Qualifying Time – 4:09.35	2	Mireia Belmonte (ESP); Melania Costa (ESP)
Olympic Qualifying Time – 4:09.35	2	Allison Schmitt (USA); Chloe Sutton (USA)
Olympic Qualifying Time – 4:09.35	1	Lotte Friis (DEN)
Olympic Qualifying Time – 4:09.35	1	Federica Pellegrini (ITA)
Olympic Qualifying Time – 4:09.35	1	Lauren Boyle (NZL)
Olympic Qualifying Time – 4:09.35	1	Camelia Potec (ROU)
Olympic Qualifying Time – 4:09.35	1	Andreína Pinto (VEN)
Olympic Selection Time – 4:18.07	13	Yelena Sokolova (RUS); Gráinne Murphy (IRL)^{[a]} Wendy Trott (RSA)^{[a]} Aya Takano (JPN); Kristel Köbrich (CHI)^{[a]} Nina Rangelova (BUL); Susana Escobar (MEX); Julia Hassler (LIE); Kim Ga-eul (KOR); Lynette Lim (SIN); Natthanan Junkrajang (THA); Mojca Sagmeister (SLO); Sara El Bekri (MAR)^{[a]}
Wildcard places	2	Andrea Cedrón (PER); Jennet Saryyeva (TKM)
Total	36	

==== Women's 800 m freestyle ====
Qualification standard	No. of athletes	Qualified athletes
Olympic Qualifying Time – 8:33.84	2	Kylie Palmer (AUS); Jessica Ashwood (AUS)
Olympic Qualifying Time – 8:33.84	2	Savannah King (CAN); Alexa Komarnycky (CAN)
Olympic Qualifying Time – 8:33.84	2	Shao Yiwen (CHN); Xin Xin (CHN)
Olympic Qualifying Time – 8:33.84	2	Rebecca Adlington (GBR); Eleanor Faulkner (GBR)
Olympic Qualifying Time – 8:33.84	2	Boglárka Kapás (HUN); Éva Risztov (HUN)
Olympic Qualifying Time – 8:33.84	2	Mireia Belmonte (ESP); Erika Villaécija (ESP)
Olympic Qualifying Time – 8:33.84	2	Katie Ledecky (USA); Kate Ziegler (USA)
Olympic Qualifying Time – 8:33.84	1	Cecilia Biagioli (ARG)
Olympic Qualifying Time – 8:33.84	1	Kristel Köbrich (CHI)
Olympic Qualifying Time – 8:33.84	1	Lotte Friis (DEN)
Olympic Qualifying Time – 8:33.84	1	Coralie Balmy (FRA)
Olympic Qualifying Time – 8:33.84	1	Gráinne Murphy (IRL)
Olympic Qualifying Time – 8:33.84	1	Lauren Boyle (NZL)
Olympic Qualifying Time – 8:33.84	1	Camelia Potec (ROU)
Olympic Qualifying Time – 8:33.84	1	Wendy Trott (RSA)
Olympic Qualifying Time – 8:33.84	1	Andreína Pinto (VEN)
Olympic Selection Time – 8:51.82	12	Yelena Sokolova (RUS); Julia Hassler (LIE); Tjaša Oder (SLO); Nina Dittrich (AUT); Patricia Castañeda (MEX); Katya Bachrouche (LIB); Sara El Bekri (MAR)^{[a]} Khoo Cai Lin (MAS); Lynette Lim (SIN); Han Na-kyeong (KOR); Samantha Arevalo Salinas (ECU)^{[b]} Natthanan Junkrajang (THA)
Wildcard places	3	Daniella van den Berg (ARU); Alexia Benitez Quijada (ESA); Simona Marinova (MKD)
Total	38	

==== Women's 100 m backstroke ====
Qualification standard	No. of athletes	Qualified athletes
Olympic Qualifying Time – 1:00.82	2	Emily Seebohm (AUS); Belinda Hocking (AUS)
Olympic Qualifying Time – 1:00.82	2	Julia Wilkinson (CAN); Sinéad Russell (CAN)
Olympic Qualifying Time – 1:00.82	2	Fu Yuanhui (CHN); Zhao Jing (CHN)
Olympic Qualifying Time – 1:00.82	2	Laure Manaudou (FRA); Alexianne Castel (FRA)
Olympic Qualifying Time – 1:00.82	2	Gemma Spofforth (GBR); Georgia Davies (GBR)
Olympic Qualifying Time – 1:00.82	2	Elena Gemo (ITA); Arianna Barbieri (ITA)
Olympic Qualifying Time – 1:00.82	2	Missy Franklin (USA); Rachel Bootsma (USA)
Olympic Qualifying Time – 1:00.82	1	Fabíola Molina (BRA)
Olympic Qualifying Time – 1:00.82	1	Simona Baumrtová (CZE)
Olympic Qualifying Time – 1:00.82	1	Mie Østergaard Nielsen (DEN)
Olympic Qualifying Time – 1:00.82	1	Jenny Mensing (GER)
Olympic Qualifying Time – 1:00.82	1	Aya Terakawa (JPN)
Olympic Qualifying Time – 1:00.82	1	Sharon van Rouwendaal (NED)
Olympic Qualifying Time – 1:00.82	1	Anastasia Zuyeva (RUS)
Olympic Qualifying Time – 1:00.82	1	Duane Da Rocha (ESP)
Olympic Qualifying Time – 1:00.82	1	Daryna Zevina (UKR)
Olympic Qualifying Time – 1:00.82	1	Kirsty Coventry (ZIM)
Olympic Selection Time – 1:02.95	16	Fernanda González (MEX)^{[a]} Alicja Tchórz (POL)^{[a]} Au Hoishun Stephanie (HKG); Ekaterina Avramova (BUL)^{[a]} Carolina Colorado Henao (COL); Melissa Ingram (NZL)^{[a]} Therese Svendsen (SWE); Kimberly Buys (BEL)^{[a]} Melanie Nocher (IRL)^{[a]} Sanja Jovanović (CRO); Eygló Ósk Gústafsdóttir (ISL)^{[a]} Eszter Povázsay (HUN); Hazal Sarıkaya (TUR); Yekaterina Rudenko (KAZ); Anja Čarman (SLO); Tao Li (SIN)
Wildcard places	5	Mònica Ramírez (AND); Anahit Barseghyan (ARM); Karen Vilorio (HON); Angelique Trinquier (MON); Inés Remersaro (URU)
Total	45	

==== Women's 200 m backstroke ====
Qualification standard	No. of athletes	Qualified athletes
Olympic Qualifying Time – 2:10.84	2	Belinda Hocking (AUS); Meagen Nay (AUS)
Olympic Qualifying Time – 2:10.84	2	Sinéad Russell (CAN); Hilary Caldwell (CAN)
Olympic Qualifying Time – 2:10.84	2	Bai Anqi (CHN); Yao Yige (CHN)
Olympic Qualifying Time – 2:10.84	2	Laure Manaudou (FRA); Alexianne Castel (FRA)
Olympic Qualifying Time – 2:10.84	2	Elizabeth Simmonds (GBR); Stephanie Proud (GBR)
Olympic Qualifying Time – 2:10.84	2	Missy Franklin (USA); Elizabeth Beisel (USA)
Olympic Qualifying Time – 2:10.84	1	Ekaterina Avramova (BUL)
Olympic Qualifying Time – 2:10.84	1	Simona Baumrtová (CZE)
Olympic Qualifying Time – 2:10.84	1	Jenny Mensing (GER)
Olympic Qualifying Time – 2:10.84	1	Eygló Ósk Gústafsdóttir (ISL)
Olympic Qualifying Time – 2:10.84	1	Melanie Nocher (IRL)
Olympic Qualifying Time – 2:10.84	1	Alessia Filippi (ITA)
Olympic Qualifying Time – 2:10.84	1	Miyu Otsuka (JPN)
Olympic Qualifying Time – 2:10.84	1	Fernanda González (MEX)
Olympic Qualifying Time – 2:10.84	1	Sharon van Rouwendaal (NED)
Olympic Qualifying Time – 2:10.84	1	Melissa Ingram (NZL)
Olympic Qualifying Time – 2:10.84	1	Alicja Tchórz (POL)
Olympic Qualifying Time – 2:10.84	1	Anastasia Zuyeva (RUS)
Olympic Qualifying Time – 2:10.84	1	Karin Prinsloo (RSA)
Olympic Qualifying Time – 2:10.84	1	Duane Da Rocha (ESP)
Olympic Qualifying Time – 2:10.84	1	Daryna Zevina (UKR)
Olympic Qualifying Time – 2:10.84	1	Kirsty Coventry (ZIM)
Olympic Selection Time – 2:15.42	10	Mie Østergaard Nielsen (DEN)^{[a]} Anja Čarman (SLO); Kim Daniela Pavlin (CRO); Au Hoishun Stephanie (HKG); Therese Svendsen (SWE); Nguyễn Thị Ánh Viên (VIE); Yulduz Kuchkarova (UZB); Dorina Szekeres (HUN); Carolina Colorado Henao (COL); Ham Chan-mi (KOR)
Total	38	

==== Women's 100 m breaststroke ====
Qualification standard	No. of athletes	Qualified athletes
Olympic Qualifying Time – 1:08.49	2	Leiston Pickett (AUS); Leisel Jones (AUS)
Olympic Qualifying Time – 1:08.49	2	Jillian Tyler (CAN); Tera van Beilen (CAN)
Olympic Qualifying Time – 1:08.49	2	Liu Xiaoyu (CHN); Zhao Jin (CHN)
Olympic Qualifying Time – 1:08.49	2	Kate Haywood (GBR); Siobhan-Marie O'Connor (GBR)
Olympic Qualifying Time – 1:08.49	2	Sarah Poewe (GER); Caroline Ruhnau (GER)
Olympic Qualifying Time – 1:08.49	2	Satomi Suzuki (JPN); Mina Matsushima (JPN)
Olympic Qualifying Time – 1:08.49	2	Yulia Yefimova (RUS); Daria Deeva (RUS)
Olympic Qualifying Time – 1:08.49	2	Concepción Badillo (ESP); Marina García (ESP)
Olympic Qualifying Time – 1:08.49	2	Jennie Johansson (SWE); Joline Höstman (SWE)
Olympic Qualifying Time – 1:08.49	2	Breeja Larson (USA); Rebecca Soni (USA)
Olympic Qualifying Time – 1:08.49	1	Petra Chocová (CZE)
Olympic Qualifying Time – 1:08.49	1	Rikke Møller Pedersen (DEN)
Olympic Qualifying Time – 1:08.49	1	Sycerika McMahon (IRL)
Olympic Qualifying Time – 1:08.49	1	Michela Guzzetti (ITA)
Olympic Qualifying Time – 1:08.49	1	Alia Atkinson (JAM)
Olympic Qualifying Time – 1:08.49	1	Rūta Meilutytė (LTU)
Olympic Qualifying Time – 1:08.49	1	Sara El Bekri (MAR)
Olympic Qualifying Time – 1:08.49	1	Moniek Nijhuis (NED)
Olympic Selection Time – 1:10.89	13	Suzaan van Biljon (RSA)^{[a]} Kim Hye-Jin (KOR); Dilara Buse Günaydın (TUR); Tjasa Vozel (SLO); Mariya Liver (UKR); Anna Sztankovics (HUN); Jenna Laukkanen (FIN); Ana Rodrigues (POR); Fanny Lecluyse (BEL)^{[a]} Fanny Babou (FRA)^{[a]} Hrafnhildur Lúthersdóttir (ISL); Chen I-Chuan (TPE); Danielle Beaubrun (LCA)^{[b]} Tatiana Chisca (MDA)^{[b]}
Wildcard Places	7	Oksana Hatamkhanova (AZE); Ivana Ninkovic (BIH); Matelita Buadromo (FIJ); Dede Camara (GUI); Pilar Shimizu (GUM); Oyungerel Gantumur (MGL)
Total	48	

==== Women's 200 m breaststroke ====
Qualification standard	No. of athletes	Qualified athletes
Olympic Qualifying Time – 2:26.89	2	Tessa Wallace (AUS); Sally Foster (AUS)
Olympic Qualifying Time – 2:26.89	2	Martha McCabe (CAN); Tera van Beilen (CAN)
Olympic Qualifying Time – 2:26.89	2	Ji Liping (CHN); Sun Ye (CHN)
Olympic Qualifying Time – 2:26.89	2	Satomi Suzuki (JPN); Kanako Watanabe (JPN)
Olympic Qualifying Time – 2:26.89	2	Jeong Da-Rae (KOR); Back Su-Yeon (KOR)
Olympic Qualifying Time – 2:26.89	2	Yulia Yefimova (RUS); Anastasia Chaun (RUS)
Olympic Qualifying Time – 2:26.89	2	Rebecca Soni (USA); Micah Lawrence (USA)
Olympic Qualifying Time – 2:26.89	1	Fanny Lecluyse (BEL)
Olympic Qualifying Time – 2:26.89	1	Rikke Møller Pedersen (DEN)
Olympic Qualifying Time – 2:26.89	1	Stacey Tadd (GBR)
Olympic Qualifying Time – 2:26.89	1	Chiara Boggiatto (ITA)
Olympic Qualifying Time – 2:26.89	1	Sara El Bekri (MAR)
Olympic Qualifying Time – 2:26.89	1	Nadja Higl (SRB)
Olympic Qualifying Time – 2:26.89	1	Suzaan van Biljon (RSA)
Olympic Qualifying Time – 2:26.89	1	Marina García (ESP)
Olympic Qualifying Time – 2:26.89	1	Joline Höstman (SWE)
Olympic Selection Time – 2:32.03	10	Sara Nordenstam (NOR); Hrafnhildur Lúthersdóttir (ISL); Ganna Dzerkal (UKR); Tanja Smid (SLO); Dilara Buse Günaydın (TUR); Martina Moravčíková (CZE); Jenna Laukkanen (FIN); Sarra Lajnef (TUN); Anna Sztankovics (HUN); Alia Atkinson (JAM)^{[a]}
Wildcard Places	1	Daria Talanova (KGZ)
Total	34	

==== Women's 100 m butterfly ====
Qualification standard	No. of athletes	Qualified athletes
Olympic Qualifying Time – 58.70	2	Alicia Coutts (AUS); Jessicah Schipper (AUS)
Olympic Qualifying Time – 58.70	2	Jiao Liuyang (CHN); Lu Ying (CHN)
Olympic Qualifying Time – 58.70	2	Ellen Gandy (GBR); Francesca Halsall (GBR)
Olympic Qualifying Time – 58.70	2	Natsumi Hoshi (JPN); Yuka Kato (JPN)
Olympic Qualifying Time – 58.70	2	Sarah Sjöström (SWE); Martina Granström (SWE)
Olympic Qualifying Time – 58.70	2	Dana Vollmer (USA); Claire Donahue (USA)
Olympic Qualifying Time – 58.70	1	Aliaksandra Herasimenia (BLR)
Olympic Qualifying Time – 58.70	1	Kimberly Buys (BEL)
Olympic Qualifying Time – 58.70	1	Daynara de Paula (BRA)
Olympic Qualifying Time – 58.70	1	Katerine Savard (CAN)
Olympic Qualifying Time – 58.70	1	Jeanette Ottesen (DEN)
Olympic Qualifying Time – 58.70	1	Alexandra Wenk (GER)
Olympic Qualifying Time – 58.70	1	Kristel Vourna (GRE)
Olympic Qualifying Time – 58.70	1	Amit Ivri (ISR)
Olympic Qualifying Time – 58.70	1	Ilaria Bianchi (ITA)
Olympic Qualifying Time – 58.70	1	Inge Dekker (NED)
Olympic Qualifying Time – 58.70	1	Ingvild Snildal (NOR)
Olympic Selection Time – 1:00.75	15	Tao Li (SIN); Birgit Koschischek (AUT); Otylia Jędrzejczak (POL)^{[a]} Irina Bespalova (RUS); Emilia Pikkarainen (FIN); Liliána Szilágyi (HUN); Denisa Smolenová (SVK); Hannah Wilson (HKG); Sara Oliveira (POR); Judit Ignacio Sorribes (ESP)^{[a]} Justine Bruno (FRA)^{[a]} Danielle Villars (SUI); Triin Aljand (EST)^{[a]} Sarah Blake Bateman (ISL)^{[a]} Sara Isaković (SLO)^{[a]}
Wildcard Places	4	Noel Borshi (ALB); Marie Laura Meza (CRC); Dorian McMenemy (DOM); Dalia Torrez Zamora (NCA)
Total	42	

==== Women's 200 m butterfly ====
Qualification standard	No. of athletes	Qualified athletes
Olympic Qualifying Time – 2:08.95	2	Jessicah Schipper (AUS); Samantha Hamill (AUS)
Olympic Qualifying Time – 2:08.95	2	Audrey Lacroix (CAN); Katerine Savard (CAN)
Olympic Qualifying Time – 2:08.95	2	Jiao Liuyang (CHN); Liu Zige (CHN)
Olympic Qualifying Time – 2:08.95	2	Ellen Gandy (GBR); Jemma Lowe (GBR)
Olympic Qualifying Time – 2:08.95	2	Mireia Belmonte (ESP); Judit Ignacio Sorribes (ESP)
Olympic Qualifying Time – 2:08.95	2	Cammile Adams (USA); Kathleen Hersey (USA)
Olympic Qualifying Time – 2:08.95	2	Zsuzsanna Jakabos (HUN); Katinka Hosszú (HUN)
Olympic Qualifying Time – 2:08.95	1	Natsumi Hoshi (JPN)
Olympic Qualifying Time – 2:08.95	1	Choi Hye-Ra (KOR)
Olympic Qualifying Time – 2:08.95	1	Otylia Jędrzejczak (POL)
Olympic Qualifying Time – 2:08.95	1	Martina Granström (SWE)
Olympic Selection Time – 2:13.46	9	Anja Klinar (SLO)^{[a]} Joanna Maranhão (BRA)^{[a]} Martina Van Berkel (SUI); Rita Medrano (MEX); Denisa Smolenová (SVK); Emilia Pikkarainen (FIN); Sara Oliveira (POR); Ingvild Snildal (NOR)^{[a]} Cheng Wan-Jung (TPE)
Total	27	

==== Women's 200 m individual medley ====
Qualification standard	No. of athletes	Qualified athletes
Olympic Qualifying Time – 2:13.36	2	Stephanie Rice (AUS); Alicia Coutts (AUS)
Olympic Qualifying Time – 2:13.36	2	Li Jiaxing (CHN); Ye Shiwen (CHN)
Olympic Qualifying Time – 2:13.36	2	Hannah Miley (GBR); Sophie Allen (GBR)
Olympic Qualifying Time – 2:13.36	2	Katinka Hosszú (HUN); Evelyn Verrasztó (HUN)
Olympic Qualifying Time – 2:13.36	2	Mireia Belmonte (ESP); Beatriz Gómez (ESP)
Olympic Qualifying Time – 2:13.36	2	Caitlin Leverenz (USA); Ariana Kukors (USA)
Olympic Qualifying Time – 2:13.36	1	Erica Morningstar (CAN)
Olympic Qualifying Time – 2:13.36	1	Theresa Michalak (GER)
Olympic Qualifying Time – 2:13.36	1	Izumi Kato (JPN)
Olympic Qualifying Time – 2:13.36	1	Choi Hye-Ra (KOR)
Olympic Qualifying Time – 2:13.36	1	Natalie Wiegersma (NZL)
Olympic Qualifying Time – 2:13.36	1	Kathryn Meaklim (RSA)
Olympic Qualifying Time – 2:13.36	1	Stina Gardell (SWE)
Olympic Qualifying Time – 2:13.36	1	Kirsty Coventry (ZIM)
Olympic Selection Time – 2:18.03	17	Amit Ivry (ISR)^{[a]} Yekaterina Andreeva (RUS); Joanna Maranhão (BRA)^{[a]} Lisa Zaiser (AUT); Ganna Dzerkal (UKR); Ranohon Amanova (UZB); Eygló Ósk Gústafsdóttir (ISL)^{[a]} Anja Klinar (SLO)^{[a]} Erica Dittmer (MEX); Sycerika McMahon (IRL)^{[a]} Simona Baumrtová (CZE)^{[a]} Kim Daniela Pavlin (CRO); Katarina Listopadova (SVK); Emilia Pikkarainen (FIN); Ingvild Snildal (NOR)^{[a]} Sara El Bekri (MAR)^{[a]} Cheng Wan-Jung (TPE)
Total	37	

==== Women's 400 m individual medley ====
Qualification standard	No. of athletes	Qualified athletes
Olympic Qualifying Time – 4:41.75	2	Stephanie Rice (AUS); Blair Evans (AUS)
Olympic Qualifying Time – 4:41.75	2	Li Xuanxu (CHN); Ye Shiwen (CHN)
Olympic Qualifying Time – 4:41.75	2	Aimee Willmott (GBR); Hannah Miley (GBR)
Olympic Qualifying Time – 4:41.75	2	Katinka Hosszú (HUN); Zsuzsanna Jakabos (HUN)
Olympic Qualifying Time – 4:41.75	2	Miyu Otsuka (JPN); Miho Takahashi (JPN)
Olympic Qualifying Time – 4:41.75	2	Mireia Belmonte (ESP); Claudia Dasca (ESP)
Olympic Qualifying Time – 4:41.75	2	Elizabeth Beisel (USA); Caitlin Leverenz (USA)
Olympic Qualifying Time – 4:41.75	1	Jördis Steinegger (AUT)
Olympic Qualifying Time – 4:41.75	1	Joanna Maranhão (BRA)
Olympic Qualifying Time – 4:41.75	1	Barbora Závadová (CZE)
Olympic Qualifying Time – 4:41.75	1	Lara Grangeon (FRA)
Olympic Qualifying Time – 4:41.75	1	Stefania Pirozzi (ITA)
Olympic Qualifying Time – 4:41.75	1	Natalie Wiegersma (NZL)
Olympic Qualifying Time – 4:41.75	1	Yana Martynova (RUS)
Olympic Qualifying Time – 4:41.75	1	Anja Klinar (SLO)
Olympic Qualifying Time – 4:41.75	1	Kathryn Meaklim (RSA)
Olympic Qualifying Time – 4:41.75	1	Stina Gardell (SWE)
Olympic Selection Time – 4:51.75	11	Stephanie Horner (CAN); Gráinne Murphy (IRL)^{[a]} Sara Nordenstam (NOR); Kim Seo-Yeong (KOR); Georgina Bardach (ARG); Sara El Bekri (MAR)^{[a]} Ganna Dzerkal (UKR); Karolina Szczepaniak (POL); Susana Escobar (MEX); Noora Laukkanen (FIN); Nguyễn Thị Ánh Viên (VIE)
Universality places	1	Anum Bandey (PAK)
Total	36	

* to be confirmed by NF/NOC

== Relay events ==
=== Men's relay events ===
==== Men's 4 × 100 m freestyle relay ====
Qualification event	No. of teams	Qualified teams
2011 World Championships	11	Australia; France; United States; Italy; Russia; South Africa; Germany; Great Britain; Brazil; ~~Japan~~; Canada; China
Best times of non-qualifiers	4	Belgium; Hungary; Serbia; Venezuela
TOTAL	15	

==== Men's 4 × 200 m freestyle relay ====
Qualification event	No. of teams	Qualified teams
2011 World Championships	12	United States; Japan; France; Australia; Italy; China; Great Britain; Germany; Austria; Canada; Russia; South Africa
Best times of non-qualifiers	4	Hungary; New Zealand; Denmark; Belgium
TOTAL	16	

==== Men's 4 × 100 m medley relay ====
Qualification event	No. of teams	Qualified teams
2011 World Championships	12	United States; Germany; Netherlands; Japan; Australia; Canada; Poland; Great Britain; France; South Africa; Italy; Russia
Best times of non-qualifiers	4	Hungary; New Zealand; Brazil; China
TOTAL	16	

=== Women's relay events ===
==== Women's 4 × 100 m freestyle relay ====
Qualification event	No. of teams	Qualified teams
2011 World Championships	12	Netherlands; United States; Germany; China; Australia; Canada; Japan; Denmark; Great Britain; Sweden; Russia; Belarus
Best times of non-qualifiers	4	Italy; New Zealand; Hungary; Greece
TOTAL	16	

==== Women's 4 × 200 m freestyle relay ====
Qualification event	No. of teams	Qualified teams
2011 World Championships	12	United States; Australia; China; France; Hungary; Great Britain; Canada; New Zealand; Japan; Russia; Germany; Italy
Best times of non-qualifiers	4	Slovenia; Spain; Poland; Ukraine
TOTAL	16	

==== Women's 4 × 100 m medley relay ====
Qualification event	No. of teams	Qualified teams
2011 World Championships	12	United States; Russia; China; Australia; Great Britain; Japan; Denmark; Sweden; Netherlands; Spain; France; Italy
Best times of non-qualifiers	4	Germany; Canada; Iceland; Hungary
TOTAL	16	

== Notes ==
a.	Qualified in other events
b.	Under universality place, but reached the Olympic Standard Time
