= Swimming at the 2011 World Aquatics Championships – Men's 200 metre backstroke =

Men's 200 metre backstroke at the 2011 World Aquatics Championships
- Dates: July 28, 2011 (heats and semifinals); July 29, 2011 (final)
- Competitors: 32 from 26 nations
- Winning time: 1:52.96

Medalists
gold medal	Ryan Lochte	United States
silver medal	Ryosuke Irie	Japan
bronze medal	Tyler Clary	United States

The men's 200 metre backstroke competition of the swimming events at the 2011 World Aquatics Championships was held on July 28 with the heats and the semifinals and July 29 with the final.

== Records ==
Prior to the competition, the existing world and championship records were as follows.

	Name	Nation	Time	Location	Date
World record Championship record	Aaron Peirsol	United States	1:51.92	Rome	July 31, 2009

== Results ==
=== Heats ===
32 swimmers participated in 5 heats.

Rank	Heat	Lane	Name	Nationality	Time	Notes
1	2	4	Tyler Clary	United States	1:56.32	Q
2	2	2	Péter Bernek	Hungary	1:57.23	Q
3	4	3	Stanislav Donets	Russia	1:57.30	Q
4	3	4	Ryan Lochte	United States	1:57.34	Q
5	3	5	Zhang Fenglin	China	1:57.37	Q
6	4	4	Ryosuke Irie	Japan	1:57.58	Q
7	2	3	Kazuki Watanabe	Japan	1:57.62	Q
8	2	5	Radosław Kawęcki	Poland	1:57.97	Q
9	4	7	Nick Driebergen	Netherlands	1:58.10	Q
10	4	1	Tobias Oriwol	Canada	1:58.19	Q
11	3	8	Yakov-Yan Toumarkin	Israel	1:58.21	Q, NR
12	3	2	Sebastiano Ranfagni	Italy	1:58.26	Q
13	2	8	Leonardo de Deus	Brazil	1:58.29	Q
14	4	2	Yannick Lebherz	Germany	1:58.30	Q
15	4	6	Benjamin Stasiulis	France	1:58.42	Q
16	1	5	Omar Pinzón	Colombia	1:58.48	Q
17	3	3	Chris Walker-Hebborn	Great Britain	1:58.59	
18	1	6	Darren Murray	South Africa	1:58.73	
19	2	7	Matthew Hawes	Canada	1:58.84	
20	3	1	Cheng Feiyi	China	1:59.08	
21	2	6	Ashley Delaney	Australia	2:00.15	
22	1	3	Mattias Carlsson	Sweden	2:00.44	NR
23	4	8	Mitch Larkin	Australia	2:00.52	
24	3	6	Gareth Kean	New Zealand	2:00.74	
25	2	1	Kim Ji-Heun	South Korea	2:01.06	
26	1	4	Sebastian Stoss	Austria	2:01.13	
27	1	2	Pedro Medel	Cuba	2:02.16	
28	1	7	Jean-François Schneiders	Luxembourg	2:03.68	
29	1	1	Abdullah Al-Tuwaini	Kuwait	2:07.63	
30	1	8	Awse Ma'aya	Jordan	2:12.22	
–	3	7	Aschwin Wildeboer	Spain		DNS
–	4	5	James Goddard	Great Britain		DNS

=== Semifinals ===
The semifinals were held at 19:23.

==== Semifinal 1 ====
Rank	Lane	Name	Nationality	Time	Notes
1	5	Ryan Lochte	United States	1:55.65	Q
2	3	Ryosuke Irie	Japan	1:55.96	Q
3	6	Radosław Kawęcki	Poland	1:57.15	Q
4	7	Sebastiano Ranfagni	Italy	1:57.96	Q
5	4	Péter Bernek	Hungary	1:58.14	
6	1	Yannick Lebherz	Germany	1:58.56	
7	8	Omar Pinzón	Colombia	1:58.95	
8	2	Tobias Oriwol	Canada	1:59.45	

==== Semifinal 2 ====
Rank	Lane	Name	Nationality	Time	Notes
1	4	Tyler Clary	United States	1:56.00	Q
2	3	Zhang Fenglin	China	1:56.70	Q
3	6	Kazuki Watanabe	Japan	1:57.97	Q
4	5	Stanislav Donets	Russia	1:58.00	Q
5	2	Nick Driebergen	Netherlands	1:58.08	
6	8	Benjamin Stasiulis	France	1:58.19	
7	1	Leonardo de Deus	Brazil	1:59.77	
8	7	Yakov-Yan Toumarkin	Israel	1:59.92	

=== Final ===
The final was held at 18:10.

Rank	Lane	Name	Nationality	Time	Notes
1st place, gold medalist(s)	4	Ryan Lochte	United States	1:52.96	
2nd place, silver medalist(s)	5	Ryosuke Irie	Japan	1:54.11	
3rd place, bronze medalist(s)	3	Tyler Clary	United States	1:54.69	
4	6	Zhang Fenglin	China	1:56.39	
5	2	Radosław Kawęcki	Poland	1:57.33	
6	8	Stanislav Donets	Russia	1:57.36	
7	7	Sebastiano Ranfagni	Italy	1:57.49	
8	1	Kazuki Watanabe	Japan	1:57.82	
