= Swimming at the 2012 Summer Olympics – Men's 200 metre backstroke =

Men's 200 metre backstroke at the Games of the XXX Olympiad
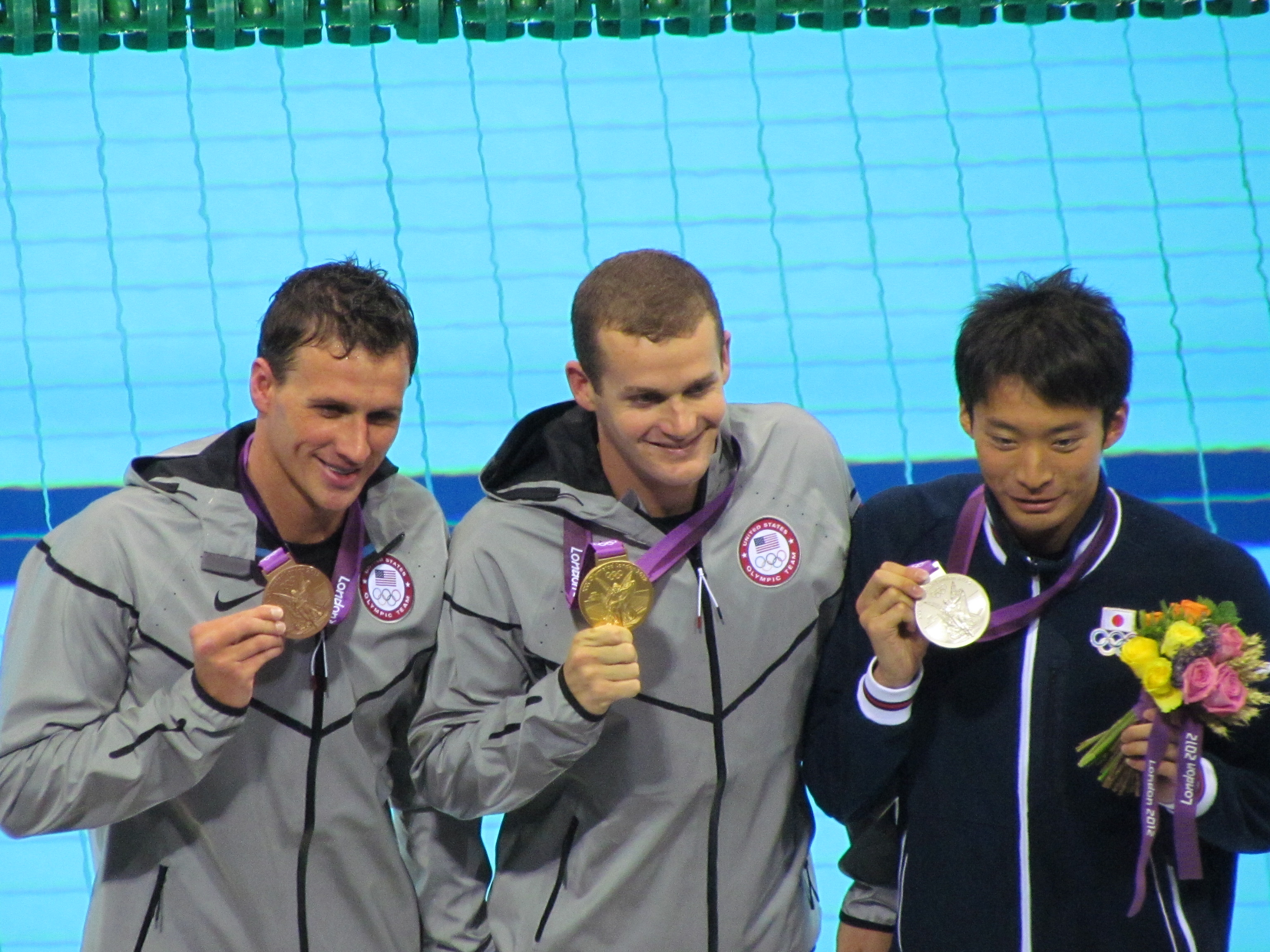
- Medalists of the event
- Venue: London Aquatics Centre
- Dates: August 1, 2012 (heats & semifinals); August 2, 2012 (final)
- Competitors: 35 from 27 nations
- Winning time: 1:53.41 OR

Medalists
1st place, gold medalist(s)		Tyler Clary	United States
2nd place, silver medalist(s)		Ryosuke Irie	Japan
3rd place, bronze medalist(s)		Ryan Lochte	United States

The men's 200 metre backstroke event at the 2012 Summer Olympics took place on 1–2 August at the London Aquatics Centre in London, United Kingdom. There were 35 competitors from 27 nations.

Despite his criticisms about Michael Phelps during training camp before apologizing for the remarks, U.S. swimmer Tyler Clary put aside all the drama to capture an Olympic title in the event. Trailing behind at the 150-metre turn, he made a late charge on the final lap to edge out Japan's Ryosuke Irie and defending champion Ryan Lochte for an Olympic record and a gold medal in 1:53.41. Clary's gold was the fifth consecutive (and eighth overall) victory by an American swimmer in the event, all by different men. Irie also overhauled Lochte about the midway through the leg, but could not catch Clary near the wall to finish only with a silver in 1:53.78. Leading almost an entire race in the first of a difficult double, Lochte faded down the stretch to pick up a bronze in 1:53.94. Lochte was the fourth man to earn multiple medals in the 200 metre backstroke.

Poland's Radosław Kawęcki matched China's Zhang Fenglin with a fourth-place time in 1:55.59, while Irie's teammate Kazuki Watanabe earned a sixth spot in 1:57.03. Israel's Yakov-Yan Toumarkin (1:57.62) and Australia's Mitch Larkin (1:58.02) also vied for an Olympic medal to round out the finale.

Other notable swimmers featured Russia's defending bronze medalist Arkady Vyatchanin, who missed a chance to climb the podium again after placing seventeenth in the prelims (1:58.69); and Turkey's Derya Büyükuncu, who opened the event with a top finish in heat one, but posted a thirty-third place time of 2:01.68 in his astonishing sixth Olympic appearance.

== Background ==
This was the 14th appearance of the 200 metre backstroke event. It was first held in 1900. The event did not return until 1964; since then, it has been on the programme at every Summer Games. From 1904 to 1960, a men's 100 metre backstroke was held instead. In 1964, only the 200 metres was held. Beginning in 1968 and ever since, both the 100 and 200 metre versions have been held.

Three of the 8 finalists from the 2008 Games returned: gold medalist Ryan Lochte of the United States, bronze medalist Arkady Vyatchanin of Russia, and fifth-place finisher Ryosuke Irie of Japan. Lochte and Irie had each earned medals in the event at both the 2009 and 2011 World Championships, with Irie both times coming in second; in 2009, behind Aaron Peirsol and ahead of Lochte, and in 2011 behind Lochte and ahead of Tyler Clary of the United States. Lochte was favoured to become only the second man to repeat as Olympic champion in the event (Roland Matthes did so in 1968 and 1972).

For the first time, no nations made their debut in the event. Australia and Great Britain each made their 13th appearance, tied for most among nations to that point.

== Qualification ==
Each National Olympic Committee (NOC) could enter up to two swimmers if both met the Olympic Qualifying Time (or "OQT"). An NOC with no swimmers meeting the OQT but at least one swimmer meeting the Olympic Selection Time (or "OST") was not guaranteed a place, but was eligible for selection to fill the overall 900 swimmer quota for the Games. For 2012, the OQT was 1:58.48 while the OST was 2:02.63. The qualifying window was 1 March 2011 to 3 July 2012; only approved meets (generally international competitions and national Olympic trials) during that period could be used to meet the standards. There were also universality places available; if no male swimmer from a nation qualified in any event, the NOC could enter one male swimmer in an event.

The two swimmers per NOC limit had been in place since the 1984 Games.

== Competition format ==
The competition followed the format established in 2000, with three rounds: heats, semifinals, and a final. The advancement rule followed the format introduced in 1952. A swimmer's place in the heat was not used to determine advancement; instead, the fastest times from across all heats in a round were used. The top 16 swimmers from the heats advanced to the semifinals. The top 8 semifinalists advanced to the final. Swim-offs were used as necessary to break ties.

This swimming event used backstroke. Because an Olympic-size swimming pool is 50 metres long, this race consisted of four lengths of the pool.

== Records ==
Prior to this competition, the existing world and Olympic records were as follows.

World record	Aaron Peirsol (USA)	1:51.92	Rome, Italy	31 July 2009
Olympic record	Ryan Lochte (USA)	1:53.94	Beijing, China	15 August 2008

The following records were established during the competition:

Date	Event	Swimmer	Nation	Time	Record
August 2	Final	Tyler Clary	United States	1:53.41	OR

== Schedule ==
The competition returned to a two-day schedule, with heats and semifinals on the same day.

All times are British Summer Time (UTC+1)

Date	Time	Round
Wednesday, 1 August 2012	10:21; 19:51	Heats; Semifinals
Thursday, 2 August 2012	19:48	Final

== Results ==
=== Heats ===
The heats were held on 1 August. The top 16 advanced to the semifinals.

Rank	Heat	Lane	Swimmer	Nation	Time	Notes
1	3	4	Tyler Clary	United States	1:56.24	Q
2	5	4	Ryan Lochte	United States	1:56.36	Q
3	5	3	Zhang Fenglin	China	1:56.71	Q
4	4	4	Ryosuke Irie	Japan	1:56.81	Q
5	2	4	Gábor Balog	Hungary	1:56.98	Q
6	4	5	Jan-Philip Glania	Germany	1:57.01	Q
7	3	7	Nick Driebergen	Netherlands	1:57.29	Q
8	5	2	Yakov-Yan Toumarkin	Israel	1:57.33	Q, NR
9	3	5	Péter Bernek	Hungary	1:57.52	Q
10	4	7	Mitch Larkin	Australia	1:57.53	Q
11	3	1	Tobias Oriwol	Canada	1:58.06	Q
12	5	6	Yannick Lebherz	Germany	1:58.07	Q
13	3	3	Kazuki Watanabe	Japan	1:58.17	Q
14	5	5	Radosław Kawęcki	Poland	1:58.18	Q
15	4	1	Omar Pinzón	Colombia	1:58.20	Q
16	4	2	Leonardo de Deus	Brazil	1:58.22	Q
17	3	2	Arkady Vyatchanin	Russia	1:58.69	
18	3	8	Marco Loughran	Great Britain	1:58.72	
19	5	7	Sebastiano Ranfagni	Italy	1:58.76	
20	2	2	Pedro Oliveira	Portugal	1:58.83	NR
21	4	8	Matson Lawson	Australia	1:58.92	
22	3	6	Chris Walker-Hebborn	Great Britain	1:59.00	
23	5	1	Anton Anchin	Russia	1:59.49	
24	4	3	Benjamin Stasiulis	France	1:59.52	
25	2	5	Darren Murray	South Africa	2:00.01	
26	2	3	Aschwin Wildeboer	Spain	2:00.02	
27	2	7	Pedro Medel	Cuba	2:00.05	NR
28	5	8	Xu Jiayu	China	2:00.26	
29	4	6	Gareth Kean	New Zealand	2:00.54	
30	2	6	Oleksandr Isakov	Ukraine	2:00.78	
31	2	8	Alexandr Tarabrin	Kazakhstan	2:01.22	
32	2	1	Park Hyung-joo	South Korea	2:01.50	
33	1	5	Derya Büyükuncu	Turkey	2:01.68	
34	1	4	Sebastian Stoss	Austria	2:02.91	
35	1	3	Quah Zheng Wen	Singapore	2:03.45	

=== Semifinals ===
Rank	Heat	Lane	Swimmer	Nation	Time	Notes
1	2	4	Tyler Clary	United States	1:54.71	Q
2	1	4	Ryan Lochte	United States	1:55.40	Q
3	2	5	Zhang Fenglin	China	1:55.66	Q, NR
4	1	5	Ryosuke Irie	Japan	1:55.68	Q
5	1	1	Radosław Kawęcki	Poland	1:56.74	Q
6	2	1	Kazuki Watanabe	Japan	1:56.81	Q
7	1	2	Mitch Larkin	Australia	1:56.82	Q
8	1	6	Yakov-Yan Toumarkin	Israel	1:57.33	Q, =NR
9	2	6	Nick Driebergen	Netherlands	1:57.35	
10	1	3	Jan-Philip Glania	Germany	1:57.43	
11	2	3	Gábor Balog	Hungary	1:57.56	
12	2	2	Péter Bernek	Hungary	1:57.71	
13	1	8	Leonardo de Deus	Brazil	1:58.14	
14	2	7	Tobias Oriwol	Canada	1:58.74	
15	1	7	Yannick Lebherz	Germany	1:58.80	
16	2	8	Omar Pinzón	Colombia	1:58.99	

=== Final ===
Rank	Lane	Swimmer	Nation	Time	Notes
1st place, gold medalist(s)	4	Tyler Clary	United States	1:53.41	OR
2nd place, silver medalist(s)	6	Ryosuke Irie	Japan	1:53.78	
3rd place, bronze medalist(s)	5	Ryan Lochte	United States	1:53.94	
4	2	Radosław Kawęcki	Poland	1:55.59	
4	3	Zhang Fenglin	China	1:55.59	NR
6	7	Kazuki Watanabe	Japan	1:57.03	
7	8	Yakov-Yan Toumarkin	Israel	1:57.62	
8	1	Mitch Larkin	Australia	1:58.02	
