= Swimming at the 2009 World Aquatics Championships – Men's 200 metre backstroke =

Men's 200 metre backstroke at the 2009 FINA World Championships
- Venue: Foro Italico
- Dates: 30 July 2009 (heats, semifinals); 31 July 2009 (final)
- Competitors: 87
- Winning time: 1:51.92 WR

Medalists
gold medal	Aaron Peirsol	United States
silver medal	Ryosuke Irie	Japan
bronze medal	Ryan Lochte	United States

The heats for the men's 200 m backstroke race at the 2009 World Championships took place in the morning and evening of 30 July, with the final in the evening session of 31 July at the Foro Italico in Rome, Italy.

== Records ==
Prior to this competition, the existing world and competition records were as follows:

World record	Aaron Peirsol (USA)	1:53.08	Indianapolis, United States	11 July 2009
Championship record	Ryan Lochte (USA)	1:54.32	Melbourne, Australia	30 March 2007

The following records were established during the competition:

Date	Round	Name	Nationality	Time	Record
30 July	Semifinal 1	Aaron Peirsol	United States	1:54.06	CR
31 July	Final	Aaron Peirsol	United States	1:51.92	WR

== Results ==
=== Heats ===
Rank	Name	Nationality	Time	Heat	Lane	Notes
1	Ryosuke Irie	Japan	1:55.20	9	4	
2	Aaron Peirsol	United States	1:55.88	8	4	
3	Ryan Lochte	United States	1:55.97	7	4	
4	Stanislav Donets	Russia	1:56.03	9	3	
5	George Du Rand	South Africa	1:56.06	8	1	AF
6	Yannick Lebherz	Germany	1:56.69	9	1	
7	Radosław Kawęcki	Poland	1:56.74	9	8	
8	Arkady Vyatchanin	Russia	1:56.97	9	5	
9	Omar Pinzón	Colombia	1:57.01	7	8	SA
10	Aschwin Wildeboer	Spain	1:57.15	8	5	
11	Chris Walker-Hebborn	Great Britain	1:57.52	8	2	
12	Takashi Nakano	Japan	1:57.58	7	3	
13	Damiano Lestingi	Italy	1:57.73	9	6	
14	Sebastiano Ranfagni	Italy	1:57.75	9	7	
15	Nick Driebergen	Netherlands	1:57.86	7	7	NR
16	Sebastian Stoss	Austria	1:57.97	9	0	
17	Ashley Delaney	Australia	1:58.02	8	3	
18	Benjamin Stasiulis	France	1:58.17	7	6	
19	Felix Wolf	Germany	1:58.41	7	2	
20	Kurt Bassett	New Zealand	1:58.46	8	8	NR
21	Matt Hawes	Canada	1:58.89	8	6	
22	Marco Loughran	Great Britain	1:59.19	8	7	
23	Derya Büyükuncu	Turkey	1:59.49	9	9	
24	Péter Bernek	Hungary	1:59.65	7	1	
25	Darren Murray	South Africa	1:59.84	5	5	
26	Rufino Regueira	Spain	2:00.35	9	2	
27	Markus Rogan	Austria	2:00.39	7	5	
28	Dimitrios Chasiotis	Greece	2:00.42	8	0	
29	Miguel Robles	Mexico	2:00.99	6	7	NR
30	Zhang Yu	China	2:01.05	5	4	
31	Leonardo Guedes	Brazil	2:01.20	7	0	
32	Pedro Oliveira	Portugal	2:01.49	6	4	
33	Pedro Medel	Cuba	2:01.70	6	6	
34	Itai Chammah	Israel	2:01.86	7	9	
35	Jakub Jasinski	Poland	2:01.95	8	9	
36	Květoslav Svoboda	Czech Republic	2:02.00	6	0	
37	Cheng Feiyi	China	2:02.29	6	3	
38	Anders McIntyre	Canada	2:02.64	5	0	
39	Andres Olvik	Estonia	2:02.97	6	8	NR
40	Andriy Kovbasa	Ukraine	2:03.56	4	4	
41	Oleg Rabota	Kazakhstan	2:03.71	6	2	
42	Robi Zbogar	Slovenia	2:03.99	6	9	
43	Karl Burdis	Ireland	2:04.34	5	6	NR
44	David Rodriguez	Cuba	2:04.42	5	2	
45	Konstantins Bohins	Latvia	2:04.61	4	2	
46	Naoufel Benabid	Algeria	2:05.06	5	1	
47	Jean-Francois Schneiders	Luxembourg	2:05.22	4	5	
48	Stanislav Osinsky	Kazakhstan	2:06.12	5	3	
49	Ehud Segal	Israel	2:06.91	6	1	
50	Rehan Poncha	India	2:06.92	4	1	NR
51	Yury Zaharov	Kyrgyzstan	2:07.07	5	7	NR
52	Achelhi Bilal	Morocco	2:07.59	3	3	NR
53	Cheah Geoffrey Robin	Hong Kong	2:08.25	4	3	
54	Ng Kai Wee Rainer	Singapore	2:08.57	4	7	
55	Do Huy Long	Vietnam	2:08.83	4	8	
56	Jean Luis Gomez	Dominican Republic	2:10.22	3	6	
57	Tsung Chao-Lin	Chinese Taipei	2:10.44	4	6	
58	Nicholas James	Zimbabwe	2:10.76	3	1	
59	Boris Kirillov	Azerbaijan	2:10.96	3	7	
60	Kaspar Raigla	Estonia	2:11.61	1	4	
61	Doğa Çelik	Turkey	2:12.26	5	9	
62	Alberto Tasini	San Marino	2:12.80	3	0	
63	Yousuf Essa Al Yousuf	Saudi Arabia	2:12.81	3	4	
64	Antonio Tong	Macau	2:13.22	4	9	
65	Khachik Plavchyan	Armenia	2:14.19	4	0	
66	Byron Briedenhann	Namibia	2:14.47	2	5	
67	Ngou Pok Man	Macau	2:14.87	2	7	
68	Abbas Raad	Lebanon	2:15.63	2	6	NR
69	Javier Hernandez Maradiaga	Honduras	2:16.09	3	8	
70	Nicholas Coard	Grenada	2:16.65	2	2	
71	Praveen Tokas	India	2:16.90	3	5	
72	Mohammed Al Ghaferi	United Arab Emirates	2:17.30	2	3	NR
73	Armando Zayas Claure	Bolivia	2:18.09	2	1	
74	Mark Sammut	Malta	2:19.46	3	9	
75	Benjamin Gabbard	American Samoa	2:20.25	1	5	
76	Marcelino Richaards	Suriname	2:21.05	2	8	
77	Heimanu Sichan	French Polynesia	2:21.63	2	4	
78	Paul Elaisa	Fiji	2:28.97	1	6	
79	Mathieu Marquet	Mauritius	2:29.91	2	9	
80	Timur Atahanov	Turkmenistan	2:34.13	1	2	
81	Elaijie Erasito	Fiji	2:36.75	1	1	
82	Ahmet Halliyev	Turkmenistan	2:39.58	1	7	
–	Hocine Haciane	Andorra	DNS	1	3	
–	Ronny Vencatachellum	Mauritius	DNS	2	0	
–	Andrejs Dūda	Latvia	DNS	3	2	
–	Saša Imprić	Croatia	DNS	5	8	
–	Brett Fraser	Cayman Islands	DNS	6	5	

=== Semifinals ===
Rank	Name	Nationality	Time	Heat	Lane	Notes
1	Aaron Peirsol	United States	1:54.06	1	4	CR
2	Ryosuke Irie	Japan	1:54.14	2	4	
3	Arkady Vyatchanin	Russia	1:54.90	1	6	ER
4	Stanislav Donets	Russia	1:55.25	1	5	
5	Ryan Lochte	United States	1:55.39	2	5	
6	Radosław Kawęcki	Poland	1:55.62	2	6	
7	George Du Rand	South Africa	1:55.75	2	3	AF
8	Aschwin Wildeboer	Spain	1:55.78	1	2	
9	Chris Walker-Hebborn	Great Britain	1:56.05	2	7	NR
10	Omar Pinzón	Colombia	1:56.40	2	2	SA
11	Nick Driebergen	Netherlands	1:56.85	2	8	NR
12	Takashi Nakano	Japan	1:57.02	1	7	
13	Sebastian Stoss	Austria	1:57.15	1	8	
14	Damiano Lestingi	Italy	1:57.37	2	1	
15	Yannick Lebherz	Germany	1:58.01	1	3	
16	Sebastiano Ranfagni	Italy	1:58.84	1	1	

== Final ==
Rank	Lane	Name	Nationality	Time	Notes
1st place, gold medalist(s)	4	Aaron Peirsol	United States	1:51.92	WR
2nd place, silver medalist(s)	5	Ryosuke Irie	Japan	1:52.51	AS
3rd place, bronze medalist(s)	2	Ryan Lochte	United States	1:53.82	
4	3	Arkady Vyatchanin	Russia	1:54.75	ER
5	8	Aschwin Wildeboer	Spain	1:54.92	NR
6	6	Stanislav Donets	Russia	1:55.36	
7	7	Radosław Kawęcki	Poland	1:55.60	NR
8	1	George Du Rand	South Africa	1:56.63	
