= Swimming at the 2012 European Aquatics Championships – Men's 200 metre backstroke =

Men's 200 metre backstroke at the 2012 European Aquatics Championships
- Dates: May 25, 2012 (heats and semifinals); May 26, 2012 (final)
- Competitors: 42 from 21 nations
- Winning time: 1:55.28

Medalists
gold medal	Radosław Kawęcki	Poland
silver medal	Péter Bernek	Hungary
bronze medal	Yakov-Yan Toumarkin	Israel

The men's 200 metre backstroke competition of the swimming events at the 2012 European Aquatics Championships took place May 25 and 26. The heats and semifinals took place on May 25, the final on May 26.

== Records ==
Prior to the competition, the existing world, European and championship records were as follows.

	Name	Nation	Time	Location	Date
World record	Aaron Peirsol	United States	1:51.92	Rome	July 31, 2009
European record	Arkady Vyatchanin	Russia	1:54.75	Rome	July 31, 2009
Championship record	Arkady Vyatchanin	Russia	1:55.44	Budapest	August 5, 2006

== Results ==
=== Heats ===
43 swimmers participated in 6 heats.

Rank	Heat	Lane	Name	Nationality	Time	Notes
1	5	4	Radosław Kawęcki	Poland	1:58.79	Q
2	5	5	Yannick Lebherz	Germany	1:58.85	Q
3	4	4	Péter Bernek	Hungary	1:59.07	Q
4	5	3	Matteo Milli	Italy	1:59.30	Q
5	5	6	Gábor Balog	Hungary	1:59.63	Q
6	6	7	Pedro Diogo Oliveira	Portugal	1:59.72	Q, NR
7	4	2	Olexandr Isakov	Ukraine	1:59.79	Q
8	6	4	Benjamin Stasiulis	France	1:59.91	Q
9	6	5	Sebastiano Ranfagni	Italy	1:59.98	Q
10	6	6	Federico Turrini	Italy	2:00.20	
11	6	2	Nimrod Shapira Bar-Or	Israel	2:00.25	Q
12	4	6	Felix Wolf	Germany	2:00.81	Q
13	4	5	Yakov-Yan Toumarkin	Israel	2:00.93	Q
14	5	8	Itai Chammah	Israel	2:01.05	
15	4	3	Christian Diener	Germany	2:01.15	
16	6	3	Eric Ress	France	2:01.21	Q
17	1	3	Ivan Trofimov	Russia	2:01.82	Q
18	3	6	Dmitry Gorbunov	Russia	2:01.93	Q
19	2	4	Martin Zhelev	Bulgaria	2:01.95	Q, NR
20	3	5	Luca Marin	Italy	2:02.23	
21	5	1	Sebastian Stoss	Austria	2:02.30	
22	4	7	Dávid Verrasztó	Hungary	2:02.33	
23	3	2	Balázs Zámbó	Hungary	2:02.36	
24	5	2	Vitaly Borisov	Russia	2:02.49	
25	1	5	Tomáš Fučík	Czech Republic	2:02.51	
26	2	6	Andres Olvik	Estonia	2:02.67	NR
27	6	1	Mikhail Zvyagin	Russia	2:02.81	
28	5	7	Mattias Carlsson	Sweden	2:02.82	
29	6	8	Lukas Räuftlin	Switzerland	2:02.84	
30	3	4	Danas Rapšys	Lithuania	2:03.22	
31	3	8	Květoslav Svoboda	Czech Republic	2:03.38	
32	4	8	Andriy Nikishenko	Ukraine	2:03.64	
33	3	3	David Gamburg	Israel	2:03.71	
34	3	7	Konstantīns Blohins	Latvia	2:03.99	
35	4	1	Mateusz Wysoczynski	Poland	2:04.02	
36	2	7	Marco Aldabe Bomstad	Norway	2:04.29	
37	2	1	Oliver Šimkovič	Slovakia	2:04.58	
38	2	8	Matas Andriekus	Lithuania	2:04.85	
39	3	1	Jean François Schneiders	Luxembourg	2:05.20	
40	2	5	Dominik Dür	Austria	2:06.78	
41	2	2	Lavrans Solli	Norway	2:07.12	
42	2	3	Karl Burdis	Ireland	2:31.44	
	1	4	Jonathan Massacand	Switzerland	DNS	

=== Semifinals ===
The eight fasters swimmers advanced to the final.

==== Semifinal 1 ====
Rank	Lane	Name	Nationality	Time	Notes
1	4	Yannick Lebherz	Germany	1:58.23	Q
2	7	Yakov-Yan Toumarkin	Israel	1:58.33	Q
3	6	Benjamin Stasiulis	France	1:59.09	Q
4	2	Nimrod Shapira Bar-Or	Israel	1:59.58	
5	3	Pedro Diogo Oliveira	Portugal	1:59.94	
6	5	Matteo Milli	Italy	2:01.57	
7	1	Ivan Trofimov	Russia	2:02.51	
8	8	Martin Zhelev	Bulgaria	2:03.18	

==== Semifinal 2 ====
Rank	Lane	Name	Nationality	Time	Notes
1	5	Péter Bernek	Hungary	1:56.11	Q, NR
2	4	Radosław Kawęcki	Poland	1:56.68	Q
3	3	Gábor Balog	Hungary	1:58.43	Q
4	2	Sebastiano Ranfagni	Italy	1:58.86	Q
5	7	Felix Wolf	Germany	1:59.41	Q
6	6	Olexandr Isakov	Ukraine	1:59.98	
7	1	Eric Ress	France	2:00.04	
8	8	Dmitry Gorbunov	Russia	2:01.77	

=== Final ===
The final was held at 18:01.

Rank	Lane	Name	Nationality	Time	Notes
1st place, gold medalist(s)	5	Radosław Kawęcki	Poland	1:55.28	CR, NR
2nd place, silver medalist(s)	4	Péter Bernek	Hungary	1:55.88	NR
3rd place, bronze medalist(s)	6	Yakov-Yan Toumarkin	Israel	1:57.35	NR
4	7	Sebastiano Ranfagni	Italy	1:57.99	
5	3	Yannick Lebherz	Germany	1:58.39	
5	8	Felix Wolf	Germany	1:58.39	
7	1	Benjamin Stasiulis	France	1:58.55	
8	2	Gábor Balog	Hungary	1:58.74	
