= Swimming at the 2010 Asian Games – Men's 200 metre backstroke =

Men's 200 metre backstroke at the 2010 Asian Games
- Venue: Aoti Aquatics Centre
- Date: 15 November 2010
- Competitors: 23 from 15 nations

Medalists
gold medal	Ryosuke Irie	Japan
silver medal	Zhang Fenglin	China
bronze medal	Cheng Feiyi	China

The men's 200 metre backstroke event at the 2010 Asian Games took place on 15 November 2010 at Guangzhou Aoti Aquatics Centre.

There were 23 competitors from 15 countries who took part in this event. Three heats were held, with two containing the maximum number of swimmers (eight). The heat in which a swimmer competed did not formally matter for advancement, as the swimmers with the top eight times from the entire field qualified for the finals.

Ryosuke Irie from Japan won the gold medal, two Chinese swimmers Zhang Fenglin and Cheng Feiyi won the silver and bronze medal respectively.

== Schedule ==
All times are China Standard Time (UTC+08:00)

Date	Time	Event
Monday, 15 November 2010	10:07	Heats
Monday, 15 November 2010	19:14	Final

== Records ==
Prior to this competition, the existing world, Asian and Games records were as follows.

World Record	Aaron Peirsol (USA)	1:51.92	Rome, Italy	31 July 2009
Asian Record	Ryosuke Irie (JPN)	1:52.51	Rome, Italy	31 July 2009
Games Record	Ryosuke Irie (JPN)	1:58.85	Doha, Qatar	4 December 2006

== Results ==
=== Heats ===
Rank	Heat	Athlete	Time	Notes
1	3	Ryosuke Irie (JPN)	1:59.78	
2	2	Zhang Fenglin (CHN)	2:00.35	
3	2	Cheng Feiyi (CHN)	2:01.31	
4	1	Kim Ji-heun (KOR)	2:02.54	
5	3	Park Seon-kwan (KOR)	2:04.01	
6	1	Sergey Pankov (UZB)	2:04.60	
7	3	Zach Ong (SIN)	2:04.89	
8	2	Rainer Ng (SIN)	2:04.95	
9	1	Oleg Rabota (KAZ)	2:05.08	
10	1	Abdullah Al-Thuwaini (IOC)	2:05.48	
11	2	Yuan Ping (TPE)	2:05.63	
12	3	Stanislav Ossinskiy (KAZ)	2:06.49	
13	3	Ian James Barr (MAS)	2:06.52	
14	1	Daniil Bukin (UZB)	2:06.75	
15	3	I Gede Siman Sudartawa (INA)	2:08.50	
16	2	Kevin Chu (HKG)	2:09.31	
17	2	Iurii Zakharov (KGZ)	2:09.88	
18	3	Antonio Tong (MAC)	2:10.53	
19	1	Rohit Halvaldar (IND)	2:12.79	
20	3	Shuaib Al-Thuwaini (IOC)	2:15.09	
21	2	Rehan Poncha (IND)	2:18.56	
22	1	Abdulrahman Al-Ollan (QAT)	2:29.28	
23	2	Hussain Al-Lanjawi (QAT)	2:35.19	

=== Final ===
Rank	Athlete	Time	Notes
1st place, gold medalist(s)	Ryosuke Irie (JPN)	1:55.45	GR
2nd place, silver medalist(s)	Zhang Fenglin (CHN)	1:57.53	
3rd place, bronze medalist(s)	Cheng Feiyi (CHN)	1:58.93	
4	Kim Ji-heun (KOR)	1:59.03	
5	Park Seon-kwan (KOR)	2:01.33	
6	Rainer Ng (SIN)	2:04.06	
7	Zach Ong (SIN)	2:04.28	
8	Sergey Pankov (UZB)	2:05.31	
