= Ahmed Atari =

Qatari swimmer

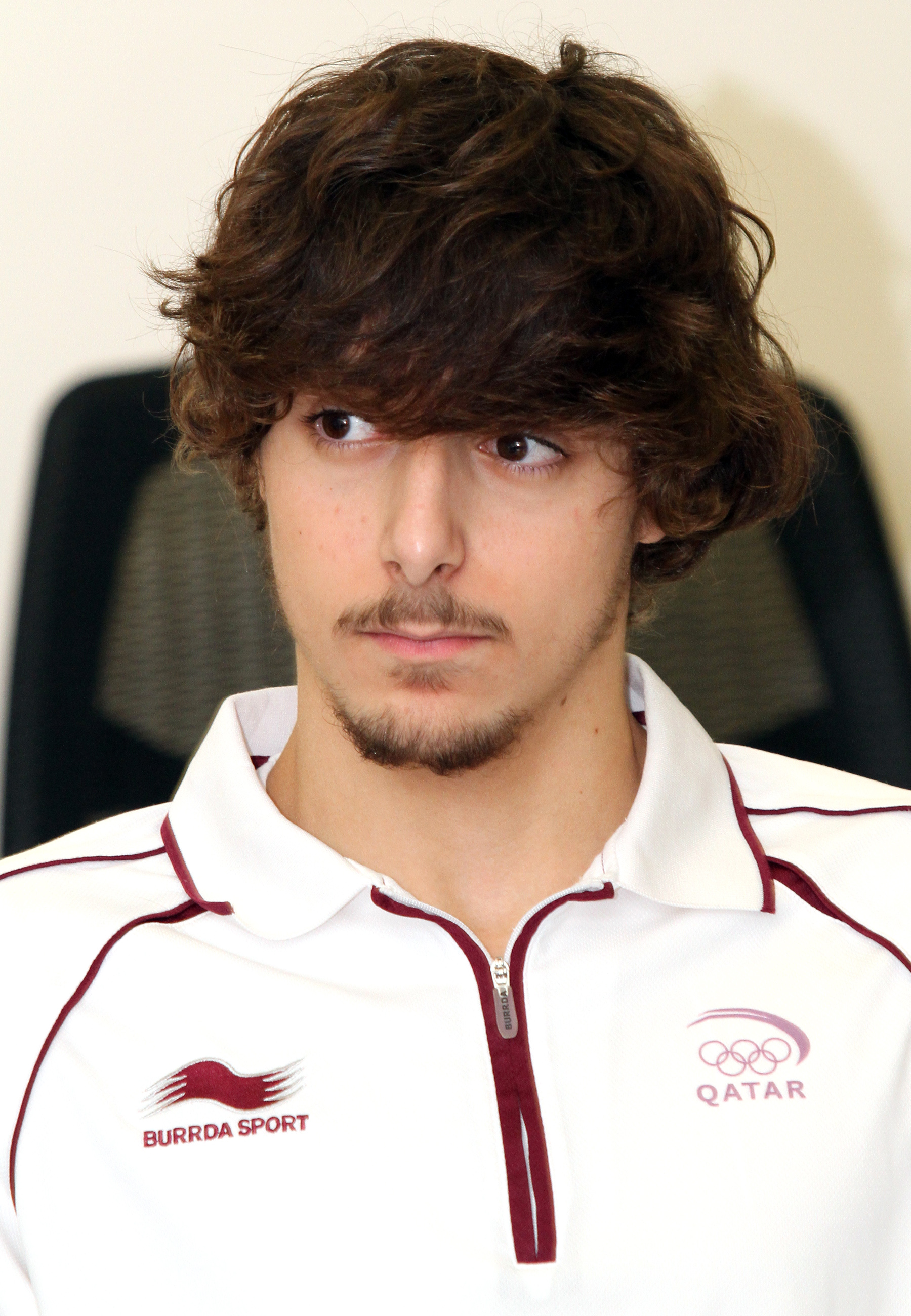
- Atari in 2012

Personal information
- Full name: Ahmed Ghithe G Atari
- Born: 2 May 1994 (age 32) Qatar
- Height: 179 cm (5 ft 10 in)
- Weight: 70 kg (154 lb)

Sport
- Sport: Swimming

Ahmed Ghithe G Atari (born 2 May 1994) is a Qatari swimmer.

At the 2011 World Aquatics Championships in Shanghai, Atari placed 34th in the 50 m backstroke heats with a time of 32.37 seconds and in the 400 m individual medley heats with a time of 5:16.80. The qualifying times were 25.98 and 4:24.77, respectively. At the short course 2010 FINA World Swimming Championships in Dubai, he placed 92nd in the 50 m freestyle heats with a time of 25.45 seconds.

Atari made his Olympic debut in 2012. Although he did not meet the Olympic qualifying time (4:16.46) or invitation time (4:25.44), he was permitted a wild card entry. The wild cards are designed to admit swimmers from developing nations that do not have swimmers who are able to meet the qualifying standards for a particular event. He finished last in the 400 m individual medley heats with a time of 5:21:30.
