= Thomas Lebherz =

German swimmer

Personal information
- Born: 26 June 1963 (age 63) Rossdorf, Germany

Sport
- Sport: Swimming
- Club: Darmstadt
Medal record
Swimming
Representing West Germany
European Championships
| Gold medal – first place | 1985 Sofia | 4×100 m medley |

Thomas Lebherz (born 26 June 1963) is a retired German backstroke swimmer who won a gold medal in the 4 × 100 m medley relay at the 1985 European Aquatics Championships. Between 1979 and 1986 he won six national titles in the 100 m and 200 m backstroke events. His son, Yannick Lebherz (b. 1989) is also a competitive swimmer.
