= Roland Rudolf =

Hungarian swimmer (born 1985)

Personal information
- Full name: Roland Rudolf
- National team: Hungary
- Born: 6 August 1985 (age 40) Budapest, Hungary
- Height: 1.92 m (6 ft 4 in)
- Weight: 78 kg (172 lb)

Sport
- Sport: Swimming
- Strokes: Backstroke
- Club: Kőbánya SC
- College team: University of Florida (U.S.)
- Coach: Gyorgy Turi; Gregg Troy (U.S.)

Roland Rudolf (born August 6, 1985) is a Hungarian swimmer, who specialized in backstroke events. He is an eight-time All-American swimmer, a multiple-time Hungarian titleholder in the age groups (1997–2004), and a two-time finalist at the 2002 European Junior Swimming Championships in Linz, Austria. Rudolf is also a member of the swimming team for the Florida Gators, and an economics graduate at the University of Florida in Gainesville, Florida.

Rudolf competed for Hungary in a backstroke double at the 2008 Summer Olympics in Beijing. Leading up to the Games, he posted a lifetime tech-suit best of 1:59.00 (200 m backstroke) to eclipse the FINA A-standard (1:59.72) by 0.72 of a second at the USA Swimming Grand Prix in Columbus, Ohio. On the second night of the Games, Rudolf obtained a fifth spot and thirty-fifth overall in heat 2 of the 100 m backstroke by one tenth of a second (0.10) behind Iceland's Örn Arnarson in 56.25. In his second event, 200 m backstroke, Rudolf rounded out the field of eight swimmers to last place in heat six with 1:59.44, just four tenths of a second (0.4) outside his entry standard and more than three seconds behind college teammate and eventual Olympic champion Ryan Lochte of the United States. Rudolf missed out the semifinals by a half-second deficit (0.50), as he shared a nineteenth-place tie with Austria's Sebastian Stoss in the prelims.
