= Alexandr Tarabrin =

Kazakhstani swimmer (born 1985)

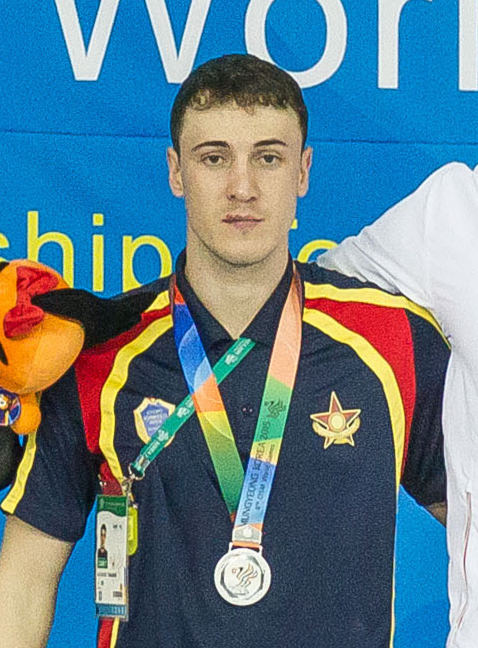
- Tarabrin at the 2015 Military World Games

Personal information
- Born: 24 April 1985 (age 41) Volgograd, Russian SFSR, Soviet Union
- Height: 1.88 m (6 ft 2 in)
- Weight: 75 kg (165 lb)

Sport
- Sport: Swimming
- Strokes: Backstroke
- College team: Volgograd State Academy (RUS)
- Coach: Azamat Sarbasov (KAZ)
Medal record
Representing Kazakhstan
Military World Games
Silver medal – second place	2015 Mungyeong	100 m backstroke

Alexandr Tarabrin (also Aleksandr, Kazakh: Александр Тарабрин; born 24 April 1985) is a Kazakhstani backstroke swimmer. He is a former member of the swimming team for Volgograd State Academy of Physical Education, and is coached and trained by Azabat Sarbasov in Almaty.

Tarabrin qualified for two swimming events at the 2012 Summer Olympics in London, by clearing FINA B-standard entry times of 54.85 (100 m backstroke) and 2:00.75 (200 m backstroke) from the Russian Championships in Moscow. On 18 July 2012, IOC had approved his legal nationality transfer from Russia in order for him to be eligible and represent Kazakhstan at these games.

In the 100 m backstroke, Tarabrin challenged seven other swimmers on the second heat, including Olympic veterans George Bovell of Trinidad and Tobago and Omar Pinzón of Colombia. He raced to sixth place and thirty-eighth overall by four hundredths of a second (0.04) behind South Korea's Park Seon-Kwan in 55.55. In the 200 m backstroke, Tarabrin touched out another South Korean swimmer Park Hyung-Joo to repeat a sixth-place finish in the same heat by 0.28 of a second in 2:01.22. Tarabrin failed to advance into the semifinals, as he placed thirtieth overall in the preliminaries.
