= Anton Anchin =

Russian swimmer

Personal information
- National team: Russia
- Born: January 30, 1990 (age 36) Sterlitemak

Sport
- Sport: Swimming
- Strokes: backstroke

Anton Anchin (born 30 January 1990) is a Russian swimmer. At the 2012 Summer Olympics, he competed in the Men's 200 metre backstroke, finishing in 23rd place overall in the heats, failing to qualify for the semifinals.
