= Yakov Toumarkin =

Russian-born Israeli swimmer

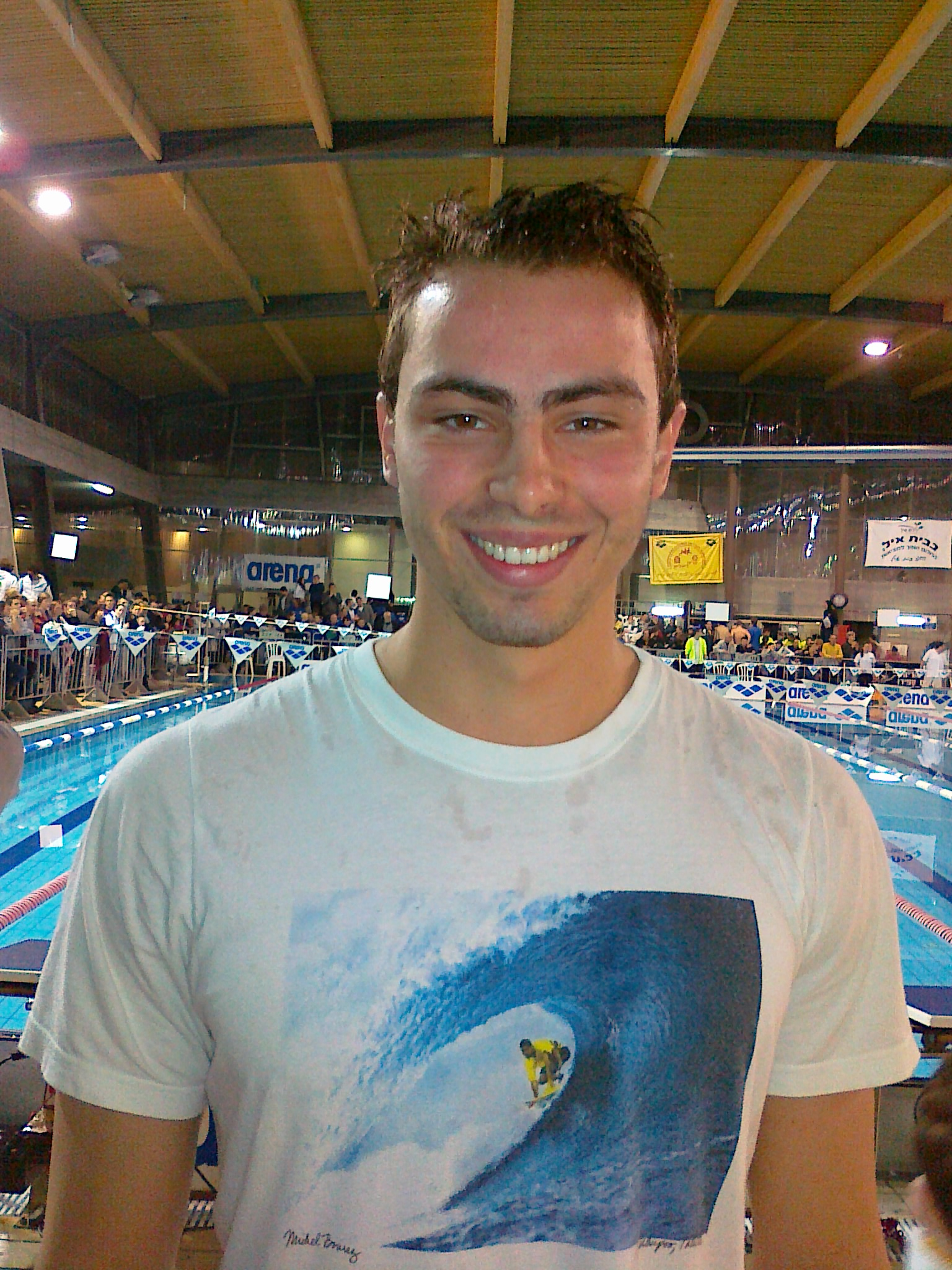
- Toumarkin in 2013

Personal information
- Native name: יעקב יאן טומרקין
- Nationality: Israeli
- Born: Yan Yakov Toumarkin; 15 February 1992 (age 34) Chelyabinsk, Russia
- Height: 1.92 m (6 ft 4 in)
- Weight: 89 kg (196 lb)

Sport
- Sport: Swimming
- Strokes: Backstroke
Medal record
Representing Israel
Men's swimming
Event	1st	2nd	3rd
European Championships (LC)	0	1	2
European Championships (SC)	0	2	0
Total	0	3	2
European Aquatics Championships (LC)
Silver medal – second place	2016 London	200 m backstroke
Bronze medal – third place	2012 Debrecen	100 m backstroke
Bronze medal – third place	2012 Debrecen	200 m backstroke
European Championships (SC)
Silver medal – second place	2015 Netanya	200 m backstroke
Silver medal – second place	2015 Netanya	100 m medley
Summer Youth Olympics
Silver medal – second place	2010 Singapore	100 m backstroke
Silver medal – second place	2010 Singapore	200 m backstroke
European Junior Swimming Championships
Gold medal – first place	2010 Helsinki	100 m backstroke
Bronze medal – third place	2010 Helsinki	200 m backstroke
Maccabiah Games
Gold medal – first place	2017 Israel	200 m backstroke

Yakov Yan Toumarkin (Hebrew: יעקב יאן טומרקין, Russian: Ян Я́ков Тума́ркин; born 15 February 1992) is a Russian-born Israeli Olympic backstroke swimmer. In 2010, he was the European Junior Swimming Champion in the 100-meter backstroke.

== Swimming career ==
In July 2010, Toumarkin won a gold medal in the 100-meter backstroke (55.20) and a bronze medal in the 200 m backstroke (2:01.14) at the 2010 European Junior Swimming Championships.

In August 2010, representing Israel at the 2010 Summer Youth Olympics, he won the silver medal in the Boys' 100-meter backstroke, finishing a tenth of a second behind the gold medalist at 55.28 seconds. Toumarkin also won a silver medal in the Boys' 200 meter backstroke, at 1:59.39. It was the third-best-time ever for an Israeli, after times of Guy Barnea and Yoav Gat, and an Israeli youth record.

In November 2010, Toumarkin set the Israeli short course (25 m) record in the 200 meter backstroke (1:53.46) at the European Short Course Swimming Championships in Eindhoven, Netherlands.

In July 2011, at the 2011 World Aquatics Championships in the 200-meter backstroke in Shanghai, China, he set a new Israeli long course (50 m) swimming record (1:58.21 minutes). Toumarkin said: "I managed to put all of the pressure out of my mind, and just pretended I was competing in a club competition in Israel."

He thereby qualified to represent Israel at the 2012 Summer Olympics in London. Toumarkin competed for Israel at the 2012 Olympics in the Men's 200 m backstroke and Men's 100 m backstroke.

In August 2015, he set the Israeli national record in the 200m backstroke with a time 1:55.96 minutes while winning the gold medal, and won a gold medal in the 100m backstroke with a time of 53.96 seconds. At the 2015 European Short Course Swimming Championships, he set the 100 IM Israeli national record with a time of 52.75.

Toumarkin competed for Israel at the 2016 Olympics in the Men's 200 m backstroke and Men's 100 m backstroke. That year he also won silver at the European Championships.

He swam for Israel at the 2017 Maccabiah Games, winning the men's 200 m backstroke in a time of 2:00.17.

== See also ==
- List of Israeli records in swimming
- Israel at the Youth Olympics

Olympic Games
Preceded by Neta Rivkin	Flagbearer for Israel (with Hanna Knyazyeva-Minenko); Tokyo 2020	Succeeded by Andrea Murez; Peter Paltchik; París 2024
