= Park Hyung-joo =

South Korean swimmer

Personal information
- Nationality: South Korea
- Born: 16 July 1995 (age 31) Seoul, South Korea
- Height: 1.85 m (6 ft 1 in)
- Weight: 71 kg (157 lb)

Korean name
- Hangul: 박형주
- RR: Bak Hyeongju
- MR: Pak Hyŏngju

Sport
- Sport: Swimming
- Strokes: Backstroke

Park Hyung-joo (Korean: 박형주; born July 16, 1995, in Seoul) is a South Korean swimmer, who specialized in backstroke events. Park qualified for the men's 200 m backstroke, as South Korea's youngest male swimmer (aged 17), at the 2012 Summer Olympics in London, by clearing a FINA B-standard entry time of 2:00.53 from the Dong-A Swimming Tournament in Ulsan. He challenged seven other swimmers on the second heat, including three-time Olympian and European short course champion Aschwin Wildeboer Faber of Spain. Park edged out Ukraine's Oleksandr Isakov to take the seventh spot by 0.28 of a second in 2:01.50. Park failed to advance into the semifinals, as he placed thirty-first overall in the preliminary heats.
