= Kazuki Watanabe (swimmer) =

Japanese swimmer

Personal information
- Born: January 12, 1987 (age 39) Yokohama, Japan

Sport
- Sport: Swimming
- Strokes: Backstroke
Medal record
Representing Japan
Summer Universiade
Bronze medal – third place	2009 Belgrade	200m backstroke

Kazuki Watanabe (born 12 January 1987) is a Japanese swimmer. At the 2012 Summer Olympics, he competed in the Men's 200 metre backstroke, finishing in 6th place in the Olympic final.
