= Oleksandr Isakov =

Ukrainian swimmer

Personal information
- Born: October 17, 1989 (age 36) Ivano-Frankivsk, Soviet Union

Sport
- Sport: Swimming
- Strokes: Backstroke

Oleksandr Isakov (Ukrainian: Олександр Володимирович Ісаков; born 17 October 1989) is a Ukrainian swimmer. He swam for Ukraine in three events at the 2008 Summer Olympics, the 100 m backstroke, finishing in 38th place, the 200 m backstroke, finishing in 39th place, and the men's 4 x 100 m medley relay. At the 2012 Summer Olympics he finished 35th overall in the heats in the Men's 100 metre backstroke and failed to reach the semifinals. He finished in 30th position in the men's 200 m backstroke.
