= Sebastian Stoss =

Austrian swimmer

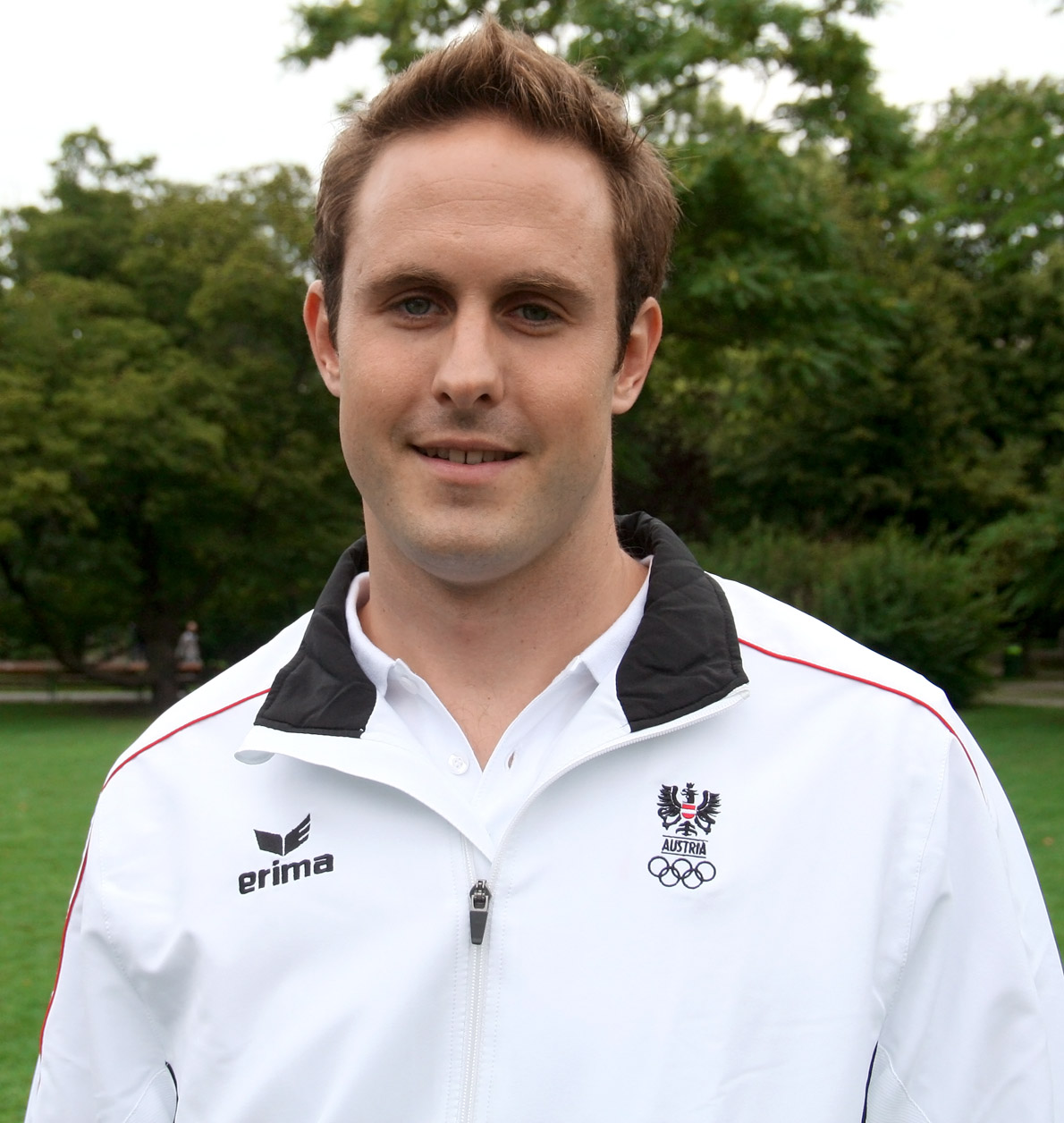

Personal information
- Nationality: Austria
- Born: 14 January 1986 (age 40) Cairo, Egypt
- Height: 1.93 m (6 ft 4 in)
- Weight: 93 kg (205 lb)

Sport
- Sport: Swimming
- Strokes: Backstroke
- Club: Eisenstädter SU
- Coach: Andrzej Szarzynski

Sebastian Stoss (born 14 January 1986 in Cairo, Egypt) is an Austrian swimmer, who specialized in backstroke events. He is a two-time Olympian, a multiple-time Austrian champion, and also, a current member of Eisenstädter Swimming Club (German: Eisenstädter Schwimmunion), under his personal coach Andrzej Szarzynski.

Stoss qualified for the men's 200 m backstroke at the 2008 Summer Olympics in Beijing, by eclipsing a FINA A-standard entry time of 1:59.27 from the European Swimming Championships in Eindhoven, Netherlands. He challenged seven other swimmers on the fourth heat, including three-time Olympians Răzvan Florea of Romania, Simon Dufour of France, and his teammate and two-time Olympic silver medalist Markus Rogan. He raced to fifth place and nineteenth overall by fifteen hundredths of a second (0.15) ahead of Japan's Takashi Nakano with a time of 1:59.44. Stoss also tied his overall position with Hungary's Roland Rudolf.

Four years after competing in his first Olympics, Stoss qualified for his second Austrian team, as a 26-year-old, at the 2012 Summer Olympics in London by clearing a B-standard entry time of 2:00.89 in the men's 200 m backstroke. Stoss raced to second place in heat 1 by a single second behind Turkish swimmer and six-time Olympian Derya Büyükuncu with a second-slowest time of 2:02.91. Stoss failed to advance into the semifinals, as he placed thirty-fourth overall in the preliminary heats.
