= Péter Bernek =

Hungarian swimmer (born 1992)

Personal information
- Nationality: Hungarian
- Born: 13 April 1992 (age 34) Budapest, Hungary
- Height: 2.10 m (6 ft 11 in)
- Weight: 83 kg (183 lb)

Sport
- Sport: Swimming
- Strokes: backstroke, freestyle
- Club: Kőbánya SC ( –2014); BVSC-Zugló (2015– )
- Coach: Péter Nagy, János Egresy (educator)
Medal record
World Championships (SC)
Gold medal – first place	2014 Doha	400 m freestyle
Bronze medal – third place	2016 Windsor	400 m freestyle
European Championships (LC)
Silver medal – second place	2012 Debrecen	200 m backstroke
Bronze medal – third place	2012 Debrecen	4×200 m freestyle
Bronze medal – third place	2012 Debrecen	4×100 m medley
Bronze medal – third place	2016 London	400 m freestyle
European Championships (SC)
Gold medal – first place	2015 Netanya	400 m freestyle
Gold medal – first place	2017 Copenhagen	400 m medley
Silver medal – second place	2017 Copenhagen	400 m freestyle
Youth Olympic Games
Gold medal – first place	2010 Singapore	200 m backstroke
European Junior Championship (LC)
Silver medal – second place	2009 Prague	400 m freestyle
Silver medal – second place	2009 Prague	200 m backstroke
Bronze medal – third place	2009 Prague	4×100 m medley

Péter Bernek (born 13 April 1992) is a Hungarian swimmer. He competed for Hungary at the 2012, 2016 and 2020 Summer Olympics. Bernek is represented by Career Sport Management.

== Career ==
Bernek won the men's 200 m backstroke at the 2010 Youth Olympics. The following year, he won bronze at the European Short Course Championships.

At the 2012 Summer Olympics, he competed in 200 m backstroke, 4 × 100 m and 4 × 200 m freestyle relays. In 2012, he won three medals at the European Championships, silver in men's 200 m backstroke, and bronze in the men's 4 × 200 m freestyle relay and the 4 × 100 m medley relay. That year, he also won silver at the European Short Course Championships in the 200 m backstroke. He won silver again in the same event at the 2013 European Short Course Championships.

He won the short course world championship in the 400 m freestyle in 2014, setting a championship record. He won gold in the same event at the 2015 European Short Course Championships, and then bronze at the 2016 Short Course World Championship.

In 2016, he won bronze in the men's 400 m freestyle at the European Championships. That year, he competed at the Olympics in the 200 m freestyle, 400 m freestyle and 4 × 200 m freestyle relay.

At the 2017 European Short Course Championships, he won gold in the 400 m medley and silver in the 400 m freestyle.

He competed at the 2020 Summer Olympics in the men's 400 m individual medley.

He retired from competitive swimming in 2022 due to a shoulder injury.

== National Records ==
At the 2012 European Short Course Championship, he also set a national record in the 200 m backstroke. He also holds the long course record in the event. He was also part of the team that set a Hungarian record in the 4 × 200 m freestyle relay at the 2016 Short Course World Championships, and the long course record at the 2009 World Championships.

== Personal life ==
He married Agnes Mutina, and they have a child. Shortly after retirement, he was diagnosed with melanoma.
