= Pedro Medel =

Cuban swimmer (born 1991)

Personal information
- Full name: Pedro Luis Medel Aguilera
- Born: September 10, 1991 (age 34) Granma, Cuba

Sport
- Sport: Swimming
- Strokes: Backstroke

Pedro Luis Medel Aguilera (born September 10, 1991) is a Cuban swimmer. He competed at the 2008 Olympics in the 200 m backstroke. At the 2012 Summer Olympics he finished 34th overall in the heats in the Men's 100 metre backstroke and failed to reach the semifinals. In the 200 m backstroke, he finished in 27th place.
