= Zhang Fenglin =

Chinese swimmer (born 1993)

Personal information
- Born: March 10, 1993 (age 33) Qingdao, China

Sport
- Sport: Swimming
- Strokes: Backstroke
Medal record
Representing China
Asian Games
| Silver medal – second place | 2010 Guangzhou | 200m backstroke |

Zhang Fenglin (born 10 March 1993) is a Chinese swimmer. He competed for China at the 2012 Summer Olympics.

== See also ==
- China at the 2012 Summer Olympics - Swimming
