= Nick Driebergen =

Dutch swimmer (born 1987)

Nicolaas Driebergen
Personal information
- Full name: Nicolaas Driebergen
- Nationality: Netherlands
- Born: 19 August 1987 (age 39) Rijnsburg
- Height: 1.87 m (6 ft 2 in)

Sport
- Sport: Swimming
- Strokes: Backstroke
- Club: Nationaal Zweminstituut Amsterdam
Medal record
Men's swimming
European Championships (LC)
Bronze medal – third place	2010 Budapest	4×100 m medley
European Championships (SC)
Bronze medal – third place	2007 Debrecen	4×50 m medley
Bronze medal – third place	2010 Eindhoven	50 m backstroke

Nicolaas "Nick" Driebergen (born 19 August 1987, in Rijnsburg) is a former Dutch Swimmer who is specialized in backstroke. He currently holds national long course records in all backstroke events and in the 4×100 medley relay. At short course he holds the national record in 50 and 100 m backstroke and in the 4×50 medley relay. He was the first swimmer in his country to swim the 100 m backstroke under 55 seconds and 200 m backstroke under 2 minutes at the long course.

== Swimming career ==
Nick Driebergen made his international debut at the European LC Championships 2006 in Budapest with a 12th place in the 50 m backstroke and a 13th place in the 100 m backstroke. Later that year he reached his first international final at the European SC Championships 2006 in Helsinki in the 100 m backstroke where he finished 8th. A week after he missed qualification for the 2007 World Aquatics Championships. He came back strong at the Dutch National Championships (LC) in June 2007 with national records in 100 and 200 m backstroke and nomination for the 2008 Summer Olympics in Beijing. In December 2007 he confirmed his nomination at the Dutch Open Swim Cup. One week later he won his first international bronze medal at the European SC Championships 2007 in Debrecen with the 4×50 medley where he swam the backstroke leg.

=== 2008 ===
In 2008 he competed in the 2008 European Aquatics Championships which were held in his native country in the city of Eindhoven. He finished 6th in the 50 m backstroke, 5th in the 100 backstroke but was disqualified in the 200 m backstroke. With the national team he ended 4th in the 4×100 medley relay. The next month he started at the 2008 FINA Short Course World Championships but stepped out of the tournament due to illness. At the Olympics he disappointedly ended 28th in the 100 m backstroke and 24th in the 200 m.

=== 2012 ===
At the 2012 Summer Olympics, Driebergen competed in the men's 100 and 200 m backstroke and was part of the Dutch 4 × 100 m medley team. In the 100 m backstroke, he reached the semi-finals, swimming a personal best (and national record) in the heats. In the 200 m backstroke, he also reached the semi-finals. The Dutch team reached the final of the 4 × 100 m medley.

== Personal bests ==
Short course
Event	Time	Date	Location
50 m backstroke	NR 23.63	2009-12-10	Istanbul, Turkey
100 m backstroke	NR 51.39	2009-12-12	Istanbul, Turkey
200 m backstroke	NR 1:53.08	2010-12-03	Amsterdam, Netherlands

Long course
Event	Time	Date	Location
50 m backstroke	NR 25.08	2009-08-01	Rome, Italy
100 m backstroke	NR 53.62	2012-07-29	London, Great Britain
200 m backstroke	NR 1:56.85	2009-07-30	Rome, Italy

== See also ==
- List of swimmers
- List of Dutch records in swimming
