= Yannick Lebherz =

German swimmer

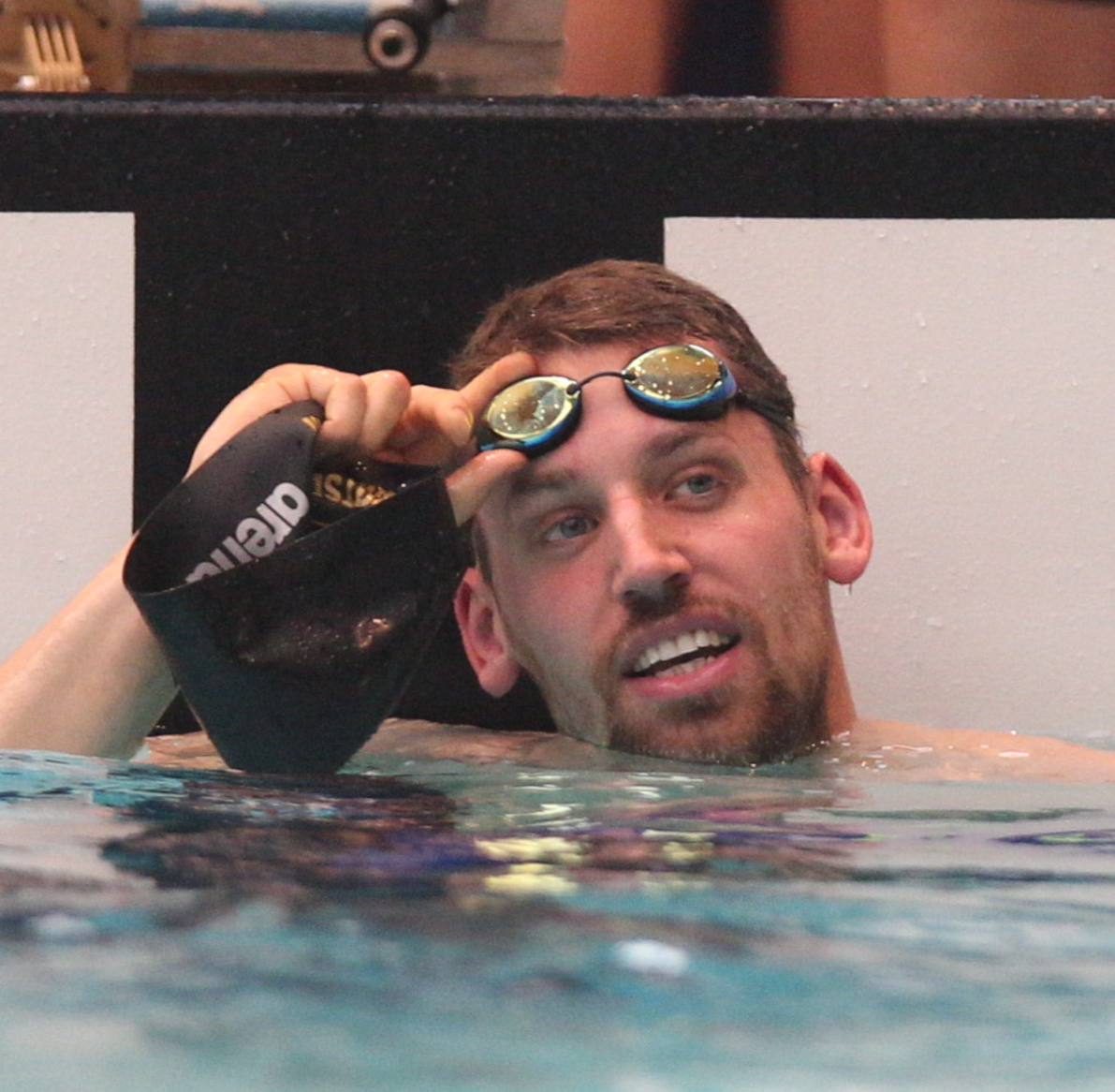

Personal information
- Born: 13 January 1989 (age 37) Darmstadt, West Germany
- Height: 1.94 m (6 ft 4 in)
- Weight: 85 kg (187 lb)

Sport
- Sport: Swimming
- Club: DSW 1912 Darmstadt
Medal record
Men's swimming
Representing Germany
World Championships (SC)
Bronze medal – third place	2012 Istanbul	4×200 m freestyle
European Championships (SC)
Gold medal – first place	2010 Eindhoven	200 m backstroke
Gold medal – first place	2014 Berlin	4x200 m freestyle
Silver medal – second place	2010 Eindhoven	400 m medley

Yannick Lebherz (born 13 January 1989) is a German swimmer who won a gold and a silver medal at the 2010 European Short Course Swimming Championships in the 200 m backstroke and 400 m medley events, respectively. He competed in the same disciplines at the 2012 Summer Olympics but failed to reach the finals.

His father, Thomas Lebherz, is a former competitive swimmer.
