= Sebastiano Ranfagni =

Italian swimmer (born 1985)

Personal information
- Nationality: Italy
- Born: 8 August 1985 (age 41) Rosenheim, West Germany
- Height: 205 cm (6 ft 9 in)
- Weight: 97 kg (214 lb; 15.3 st)

Sport
- Sport: Swimming
- Strokes: Backstroke
- Club: C.S. Carabinieri and Rari Nantes Florentia
Medal record
Mediterranean Games
Silver medal – second place	2009 Pescara	200 m Backstroke
Summer Universiade
Bronze medal – third place	2011 Shenzhen	100 m Backstroke

Sebastiano Ranfagni (born 8 August 1985) is a male Italian swimmer.

== Biography ==
In 2012 Sebastiano Ranfagni qualified for his first Olympic appearance in London 2012. There he competed in the men's 200 m backstroke, being knocked out in the first round.

Ranfagni was born in Germany, but is Italian citizen, he is very tall, at 205 cm.
