= Benjamin Stasiulis =

French swimmer (born 1986)

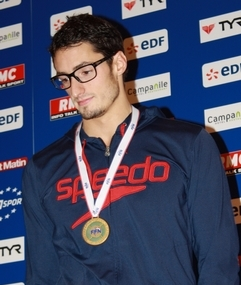
- Stasiulis in 2011

Personal information
- Nationality: French
- Born: 20 July 1986 (age 40) Mulhouse, Haut-Rhin, France
- Height: 185 cm (6 ft 1 in)
- Weight: 82 kg (181 lb)

Sport
- Country: France
- Sport: Swimming
- Event: Backstroke

Achievements and titles
- Olympic finals: 2008: 25th, 9th 2012: 31st,24th
Medal record
World Championships (SC)
Silver medal – second place	2014 Doha	4×50 m medley
Bronze medal – third place	2014 Doha	4×100 m medley
European Championships (LC)
Silver medal – second place	2016 London	4×100 m medley
Bronze medal – third place	2010 Budapest	200 m backstroke
European Championships (SC)
Silver medal – second place	2012 Chartres	100 m backstroke
Bronze medal – third place	2012 Chartres	200 m backstroke
Bronze medal – third place	2009 Istanbul	4×50 m medley relay
Mediterranean Games
Gold medal – first place	2013 Mersin	200 m backstroke
Silver medal – second place	2013 Mersin	100 m backstroke
Silver medal – second place	2013 Mersin	4×200 m freestyle

Benjamin Stasiulis (born 20 July 1986) is a French swimmer. He has competed at the 2008 and 2012 Summer Olympics.

== Career ==
At the 2008 Olympics, he competed in the men's 100 m backstroke, failing to reach the semifinals, and swam the backstroke leg for the French 4 × 100 m relay team, which failed to qualify for the final.

At the 2012 Summer Olympics he finished 31st overall in the heats in the Men's 100 metre backstroke and failed to reach the semifinals. He also failed to progress from the heats of the men's 200 m backstroke.

== Personal life ==
Stasiulis is of Lithuanian descent from his father's side.
