= List of Engine Sentai Go-onger episodes =

This is a list of Engine Sentai Go-onger episodes. Each episode is called a Grand Prix (グランプリ, Guran Puri), or "GP" for short. The colored line preceding an episode entry indicates which of the Engines is narrating the episode.

== Episodes ==
| No. | Title | Written by | Original release date |
|---|---|---|---|
| 1 | "Allies of Justice"; Transliteration: "Seigi no Mikata" (Japanese: 正義ノミカタ) | Junki Takegami | February 17, 2008 |
In the Machine World, the Engines Speedor, Bus-on, and BearRV defeat Gaiark's three Pollution Ministers in a race, knocking the three last survivors of their kind into a wormhole leading to Earth. Six months later, deciding to make Earth their home by polluting it, Gaiark start attacking the human race with their Barbaric Machine Beast Shoukyaku Banki leading the Ugatts on the day of a wedding. However, Shouyaku Banki faces three carefree humans, Sōsuke, Renn and Saki, who knew of Gaiark as they change into the Go-ongers to fight the enemy before they retreat. At Gaiark's Hellgaille Place, Shoukyaku Banki is upgraded with the perfected Bikkurium Energy and then sent back after the Go-ongers only to be defeated by the heroes. When Gaiark sends out their Barbaric Dohma armada to cover the unconscious Shouyaku Banki while the Bikkurium begins to manifest, the Go-ongers summon the benefactors of their power; the three Engines who have followed Gaiark to Earth. After the Engines take out the Barbaric Dohmas, Shoukyaku Banki's Bikkurium finally takes effect and he undergoes Industrial Revolution. The Engines counter and combine to form EngineOh, who plugs Shoukyaku Banki's smoke stacks before scrapping him. After the fight, Hant and Gunpei, two men who witnessed the Go-ongers' fight earlier, approach the trio again to speak to the Engines and demand to join their team. As Hant argues with Gunpei, Sōsuke, Renn, and Saki stealthily leave in the Ginjiro-go.
| 2 | "Reckless Guys"; Transliteration: "Mucha na Yatsura" (Japanese: 無茶ナヤツラ) | Junki Takegami | February 24, 2008 |
Water Pollution Minister Kegalesia sends Pipe Banki to pollute Earth's waters. Bomper, the Go-onger's support robo, picks up on Pipe Banki's presence and sends the three Go-ongers to the nearby dam to battle the foe. Surprisingly, Pipe Banki escapes before the battle's end, satisfied with how his powers have affected the water supply. During the fight, Gunpei sneaks aboard the Ginjiro-go, kidnaps Bomper, and steals the Engine Casts, intending to ask the robot about the Go-ongers again. Hant appears and is awed by Bomper's ability to speak. After Bomper tells Gunpei and Hant why the Engines need human partners, the Go-ongers arrive. Sōsuke struggles with Gunpei to retrieve the Engine Casts, but a doubtful Gunpei beats them back. Suddenly, an enlarged Pipe Banki returns to flood the city. Without their Engine Casts, the Go-ongers assemble the Highway Buster in a seemingly futile attempt to defeat Pipe Banki. As Gunpei watches them recklessly fight against the odds, Bomper reveals the origins of the three Go-ongers and why they were picked as the Engines' drivers. With a change of heart, Gunpei decides to return the Engine Casts, and Hant offers his help to do so. Seeing the same sense of justice he saw in Sōsuke, Renn, and Saki, Bomper gives Hant and Gunpei the ShiftChangers, allowing them to become Go-ongers. With their Engine Casts back, the primary Go-ongers are able to form EngineOh to battle and scrap Pipe Banki, while Hant and Gunpei rescue a mother and child caught in the battle. With the addition of Hant and Gunpei, the Go-ongers are finally assembled to fight Gaiark.
| 3 | "Basic Investigation"; Transliteration: "Sōsa no Kihon" (Japanese: 捜査ノキホン) | Junki Takegami | March 2, 2008 |
While Renn and Saki practice sparring with Gunpei, Sōsuke goofs around with Hant until Gunpei trips him. Gunpei criticizes the primary Go-ongers' childish antics until Bomper reports Gaiark activity at a mountain in nearby northern Kanto. Once there, the Go-ongers are shaken by a sudden tremor that takes out the forest before the gang get ambushed by the Ugatts. While the primary Go-ongers battle the Ugatts, Go-on Black and Go-on Green leave the fight and find the source of the tremor: Scoop Banki. After being forced above ground, Scoop Banki overpowers the Go-ongers before escaping underground once more. Annoyed with the primary team, Gunpei takes Hant underground to further investigate Scoop Banki's activities. The two soon find Scoop Banki's set-up of a weapon of mass destruction. They charge in to fight Scoop Banki and destroy the weapon. However, Go-On Green and Go-On Black are defeated by an irate Scoop Banki and left for dead as he leaves to personally ensure his target's destruction. Meanwhile, at Hellgailles Palace, Land Pollution Minister Yogostein reveals that Scoop Banki was initially incorrect about the target site, whose destruction would serve as Gaiark's declaration of war on the human race. The primary Go-ongers are hanging out at the Ginjiro-go and accidentally learn that Scoop Banki's target is the Neo Tokio Hills development, which is to open that day. At the ribbon-cutting ceremony, Scoop Banki arrives to wreak havoc, but is ambushed by Sōsuke, Renn, and Saki, who were in disguise at the event. Go-on Black and Go-on Green arrive, and the assembled Go-ongers then fight Scoop Banki, defeating him with the BearRV-powered Highway Buster. Scoop Banki undergoes Industrial Revolution and EngineOh forms to fight him. EngineOh destroys Scoop Banki's shovel gauntlets before scrapping him. After the battle, Bomper intercepts the energy signatures of the two new Engines entering Earth's atmosphere: Birca and Gunpherd.
| 4 | "Engine Trouble"; Transliteration: "Enjin Toraburu" (Japanese: 炎神トラブル) | Junki Takegami | March 9, 2008 |
Gunpherd and Birca, the other two Engines sent to pursue Gaiark alongside Speedor, Bus-on, and BearRV, finally arrive on Earth. Bomper detects their signatures as they reach Earth's atmosphere. The Go-ongers rush to the landing site as Kegalesia tries to intercept them. Gunpei finds the Engine Soul of Gunpherd, but not his Engine Cast. Gunpei and Sōsuke eventually discover that Gunpherd's Engine Cast is in the hands of a boy who thinks it is a toy. While Sōsuke and Gunpei attempt to get Gunpherd's Engine Cast back, Hant, Saki, and Renn find Birca as he splits into his Engine Soul and Engine Cast. Hant retrieves the Engine Soul, but the Engine Cast is captured by Spray Banki. Renn, Saki, and Hant attempt to reclaim Birca's Engine Cast when Kegalesia reveals herself. She fights Go-on Green as Go-on Red arrives and the primary Go-ongers use the Highway Buster on Spray Banki. Spray Banki gets Industrial Revolutionized and battles EngineOh with a Barbaric Dohma squad led by Kitaneydas to provide backup. The Dohma squad is sent to capture Gunpherd's Engine Cast, so they seek out the boy who has found it. Go-on Black rescues the boy and destroys his attackers. The grateful young man gives Gunpherd's Engine Cast to Go-on Black as a reward for saving him, and Go-on Green takes Birca's Engine Cast back from Kegalesia. Once again able to assume their full size, Birca and Gunpherd deal with the Barbaric Dohmas before wounding Spray Banki for EngineOh to land the coup de grâce. The Go-onger team and their Engine partners are finally together to battle Gaiark, though Birca and Gunpherd's full capabilities are yet to be revealed.
| 5 | "Sometimes a Mother!?"; Transliteration: "Tokidoki Okan!?" (Japanese: 時々オカン！？) | Junki Takegami | March 16, 2008 |
As Renn prepares breakfast, Hant leaves to work part-time at the PaPa Crepe Shop, where he meets and flirts with girls his age. Renn, Saki, and Sōsuke debate whether or not Hant should even have a part-time job, until Bomper alerts the Go-ongers to the arrival of Jishaku Banki, who is using his power of magnetism to attract all metallic objects to himself. The remaining Go-ongers fight and defeat the Barbaric Machine Beast with Hant arriving afterwards, much to Sōsuke's annoyance. Sōsuke tells Hant that if he values his job more than being a Go-onger, he should leave the team. Renn goes to talk to Hant, who lies about why he has been working; he tells Renn that he wants to make money so that the gang can have a barbecue dinner. Renn believes Hant's story and becomes upset when Sōsuke expresses skepticism. Bus-on suggests to Renn that he should go to PaPa Crepe to see if Hant had told the truth, so he does, and finds Hant chatting with his customers. Despite this, Renn cheerfully decides to help Hant make crepes. Meanwhile, at Hellgailles Palace, an impressed Yogostein enhances Denjishaku Banki. Renn and Hant get the call from Bomper, but Renn tells Hant to stay with the shop and that he will go fight for both of them. The Go-ongers attempt to fight Denjishaku Banki, but are overwhelmed by the foe. Distracted and now wracked with guilt, Hant tells the crepe shop customers that he must go help his friends but his customers encourage him to go fight alongside his fellow Go-ongers. Hant shows up to the battle and apologizes to Renn for lying to him and the other Go-ongers. Using the powerless Denjishaku Banki's powers against him, the Go-ongers defeat him with the Junction Rifle. Denjishaku Banki is then enlarged, so the Engines arrive to fight. EngineOh pulls out the Go-On Sword, but Denjishaku Banki attracts it to him and uses it against EngineOh. Birca jumps into the fray, combining with EngineOh to form EngineOh Birca who scraps Denjishaku Banki once and for all. Afterwards, the gang look forward to their barbecue dinner, but because Hant had abandoned the crepe shop, he would not be getting paid and would be unable to buy the meat. Ever resourceful, Renn announces that he has some barbecue meat and can work it into that evening's dinner.
| 6 | "The Maiden's Heart"; Transliteration: "Otome no Kokoro" (Japanese: 乙女ノココロ) | Junki Takegami | March 23, 2008 |
After Sōsuke attempts to apologize to Saki for unwittingly upsetting her, she is drawn to a beautiful melody played by a handsome flautist named Seiji Ogawa. Suddenly, Speaker Banki appears and turns Seiji's beautiful music into noise pollution. Saki rescues Seiji from the Savage Machine Beast's attack before she and Sōsuke fight him. The other Go-ongers arrive, all wearing earplugs, and damage the monster's speakers, forcing him to retreat. Seiji asks Saki out on a date, and when Sōsuke gets wind of it, he is concerned that she has fallen in love with the musician. He asks Gunpei to help him find out for certain, after the latter insinuates that he has excellent lip-reading skills. Gunpei agrees, but in reality, his lip-reading skills are sub-par, and only heighten Sōsuke's worries. A few days later, the upgraded Speaker Banki resumes his attack after secretly absorbing sounds from the city. Seiji calls Saki and asks her to meet him; he has something important to tell her. As word of Speaker Banki's rampage gets out, Saki moves to go into battle, but Sōsuke, believing that she intends to marry Seiji, tells her to follow her heart and not her teammates. The male Go-ongers, however, come up short against Speaker Banki. Saki arrives and saves her teammates; when she met with Seiji, he gave her some information that he was confident would give her an advantage in battle. Armed with the knowledge, the Go-ongers use the Highway Buster and the Junction Rifle to defeat Speaker Banki who enlarges. The team forms EngineOh to battle him, but they are overpowered. Gunpherd arrives to support the team, executing Engine Armament with EngineOh to form EngineOh Gunpherd, who scraps Speaker Banki with his supersonic bullets. After the battle, Sōsuke apologizes to Saki, who tells him she will never leave the team.
| 7 | "Partner Amigo"; Transliteration: "Aibō Amīgo" (Japanese: 相棒アミーゴ) | Shō Aikawa | March 30, 2008 |
Two shadows are seen moving about underground, with the Go-ongers pursuing what they think are two Savage Machine Beasts. Once at the rusted Tokyo Tower, with Gunpei and Gunpherd having a falling out over whose fault it was that three bullets went astray when the team scrapped Speaker Banki, the Go-ongers divide into two teams to counter these monsters when they split up. Soon after, Gunpei's group encounters the mysterious being, the Engine Carrigator of the Gian Race. As Carrigator attacks Birca and Gunpherd in retaliation, Sōsuke's group battles the actual Savage Machine Beast, Bombe Banki, who tricks the Go-ongers into thinking that Carrigator's on Gaiark's side. Though defeated by the Highway Buster, Bombe Banki is enlarged and attempts to outrun EngineOh. EngineOh follows, only to fall into a trap planned by the Pollution Ministers. Meanwhile, learning the truth of Carrigator wanting to fight Gaiark, Gunpei manages to gain Carrigator's trust and convince him to fight by their side. Once arriving to the battlefield, Carrigator, Gunpherd, and Birca take out the enemy before they perform their own Engine Combination: forming GunBirOh to destroy Bombe Banki. Though the gang have a new ally, Speedor and the others are still rusted.
| 8 | "The Greatest Miracle"; Transliteration: "Saikō no Kiseki" (Japanese: 最高ノキセキ) | Shō Aikawa | April 6, 2008 |
The giant Boring Banki attacks the city until the Go-ongers arrive, letting Carrigator rest due his massive recharging as the primary Go-ongers attempt to use Speedor and the others. However, the primary Go-ongers learn their Engine partners are unable to enlarge due to Bombe Banki's attack. As Boring Banki withdraws, the Pollution Ministers arrive to take out the Go-ongers personally with the Engines disposed of, defeating them easily with their barrier attack. Later, after an attempt of removing the rust with a miracle and Speedor not being as confident, an upset Sōsuke runs off to vent his rage until he receives aid from his racing coach: Tojiro Fuji. Seeing that Sōsuke still the same as he was, a miracle maker who acts on his own, Tojiro reminds him that even heroes need the support of others. Sōsuke finds Speedor, who almost got himself killed to find his partner. Though Sōsuke apologizes for his actions, Speedor stays the true miracle was their meeting. As Sōsuke resumes de-rusting Speedor, Gunpei and Hant learn that Boring Banki plans to drill into a magma chamber below the city in order to destroy it in an eruption. The two transform to fight the Pollution Ministers before Go-on Blue and Go-on Yellow arrive after restoring their Engines to cover the two as they form GunBirOh to stop Boring Banki, only to get overpowered by the foe due to Carrigator not being at full power. But at the last second, Sōsuke arrives with a fully restored Speedor. Using the Highway Buster three times, the Go-ongers take out the Pollution Ministers' barrier before forming EngineOh to support GunBirOh. Together, EngineOh and GunBirOh scrap Boring Banki with their attacks as Tojiro watches in pride of Sōsuke's miracle coming true.
| 9 | "Tomorrow is There"; Transliteration: "Ashita ga Arusa" (Japanese: 明日ガアルサ) | Junki Takegami | April 13, 2008 |
When Saki goes out shopping with Hant, Lens Banki starts attacking, taking peoples' pictures before they disappear into the Junk World, another Frame Dimension like Machine World. When Go-on Green tries to contact the others, he and Saki get their pictures are taken by the Savage Machine Beast and disappear into the Junk World. Realizing they cannot change or communicate, Saki blames herself with Hant cheering her up as he promises her they will get back. Back in the Human World, Sōsuke and the others arrive to fight Lens Banki, dodging the Savage Machine Beast's attacks before he retreats. After getting some idea of what became of Hant and Saki, Sōsuke and the others attempt a means to pinpoint their friends' location as Renn realizes a weakness in Lens Banki. Back at the Junk World, Saki and Hant find the other humans captured by Ugatts as part of Kitaneydas' "Ugatts Supplement Plan", using the Junk World's mechanization effect on humans to turn them into Ugatts. After being reminded by her actions as Go-onger, Saki regains her smiley outlook as she and Hant save the people regardless of being unable to change into their Go-onger forms. Back in the Human World, Go-on Red, Go-on Blue, Go-on Black trick Lens Banki into taking their decoy trap and reverse the Savage Machine Beast's dial to bring Saki, Hant, and the others back. Once assuming their Go-onger forms, Saki and Hant join the other Go-ongers in knocking Lens Banki away with the Super Highway Buster. However, Lens Banki enlarges and overpowers EngineOh and GunBirOh before attempting to send them all to the Junk World. But the two manage to blind Lens Banki with the sun behind them before the Engines use their signature attacks to scrap him. After the Ugatts-transformed humans return to normal, the Go-ongers celebrate their latest victory with cake Saki made herself, with everyone enjoying it, unaware of the bigger challenges ahead.
| 10 | "Starting Alright"; Transliteration: "Hassha Ōrai" (Japanese: 発車オーライ) | Junki Takegami | April 20, 2008 |
While the others choke down the breakfast Saki has made for them, Renn works on retooling Speedor, Bus-on, and BearRV to work with Carrigator. At Hellgailles Palace, thanks to the images Lens Banki took before he was destroyed by EngineOh and GunBirOh, the Pollution Ministers collaborate to create a special Savage Machine Beast that can replicate the Engines' special attacks: Kagami Banki. Once the enlarged Kagami Banki goes on the attack, the Go-ongers form EngineOh and GunBirOh to fight it, but the Savage Machine Beast uses his "Mirror Effect" power to copy GunBirOh's attacks and defeat it before creating his own Go-on Sword to take out EngineOh until the beast runs out of Bikkurium and is forced to retreat. Back at the Ginjiro-go, Renn reveals that he was aware that Gaiark would pull off such a stunt and that he has been creating a new formation that would combine all six Engines together into one to counter such a situation. Renn enlists Gunpei and Hant's help in finishing the modifications to Birca, Gunpherd, and Carrigator. The bored Pollution Ministers, while waiting for the beast to recharge, send a massive armada of Barbaric Dohma to attack the city. Renn gives Sōsuke Bus-on to help him, Speedor, Saki and BearRV fight the Barbaric Dohmas as Renn and the others complete the modifications. After the Barbaric Dohmas are scrapped, Kagami Banki arrives with the Engines' five minutes, assuming his true Land/Water/Air Pollution Special form to overpower EngineOh. Once the other Engines finally arrive, they execute the G6 Formation and assemble to form EngineOh G6, who overpowers and scraps Kagami Banki. The Go-ongers congratulate Renn for the new formation, but he modestly refuses to take all the glory. However, a more pressing issue is at hand; the Engines will shrink in ten seconds, but the Go-ongers are all still inside of them!
| 11 | "Airwave Jack"; Transliteration: "Denpa Jakku" (Japanese: 電波ジャック) | Kenji Konuta | April 27, 2008 |
When Gunpei talks with Hant about his part time flower arranging job and Gaiark not surfacing since the debut of EngineOh G6, Bomper tells them to turn on the TV, which shows Sōsuke as a G1 Racecar Driver in an upcoming race, Saki as an idol, and Renn as a Quiz Encyclopedia game show contestant. When Hant runs off when he learns he is to inherit a fortune from millionaire Kinzoshi Kanekura, Gunpei is forced to run from the police when charged for robbing a bank. Deciding to do something about this incognito, Gunpei tries to snap the others out of the deception by Antenna Banki, who is using the power of television to hypnotize not only the Go-ongers to keep them apart, but also the masses into increase the output of pollution. When Gunpei realizes the scheme revolves around TV, Gunpei makes his way to Antenna Banki and fight him on his own, losing to the stronger opponent before being tossed aside to be arrested. But when Antenna Banki airs Gunpei's arrest live on national television, the other Go-ongers realize the truth and make it in time before Antenna Banki finishes Gunpei off. After the team thank Gunpei for snapping them out of their deception, the assembled Go-ongers defeat Antenna Banki with a Gunpherd-powered Super Highway Buster. When Antenna Banki enlarges, EngineOh and GunBirOh are formed to double team him with GunBirOh finishing the fight on its own as it scraps Antenna Banki. As the city is cleaned up with Satellite Banki's spell wearing off, the others annoyingly tend to Gunpei's needs until he cannot take it anymore.
| 12 | "Sōsuke Banki!?"; Transliteration: "Sōsuke Banki!?" (Japanese: 走輔バンキ！？) | Jun'ichi Miyashita | May 4, 2008 |
While the other Go-ongers are practice sparring with each other, Sōsuke is laid up with a cold and has been resting inside the Ginjiro-go for the last three days. The Ministers send Hatsuden Banki into the city to discharge lightning and cause mayhem. Despite his cold, Sōsuke rushes to confront Hatsuden Banki, who is none too impressed by Sōsuke's confidence. When Sōsuke executes a close range attack, Hatsuden Banki's generator overloads and discharges a bolt of lightning that zaps them both and switches their bodies. The other Go-ongers find who they think is Sōsuke (but is actually the soul of Hatsuden Banki in Sōsuke's body) and bring him back to the Ginjiro-go, while Sōsuke, whose soul is trapped in Hatsuden Banki's body, awakens in confusion in front of Yogostein. Each sees a golden chance to destroy his enemy from within, but Hatsuden Banki is waylaid by the other Go-ongers' earnest, yet bizarre, attempts to cure "Sōsuke" of his cold, and "Hatsuden Banki" is set to have his power amplified for Yogostein's "Plan B." When "Hatsuden Banki" destroys the generator that has amplified his powers, "Sōsuke," who has escaped from the Go-ongers, shows up and tries to convince Yogostein that he is really Hatsuden Banki. The two start battling each other, and just as Yogostein figures out the situation, the other four Go-ongers arrive. Yogostein grabs "Sōsuke" and threatens to kill him if the Go-ongers do not defeat "Hatsuden Banki." However, the Go-ongers see right through Yogostein's plan, thanks to Speedor, and attack "Sōsuke" instead, forcing Yogostein to retreat. "Sōsuke" turns into "Go-on Red" and fights the Go-ongers, but is knocked down by "Hatsuden Banki." Speedor and his fellow Engines combine their powers to draw Sōsuke's soul from "Hatsuden Banki" into a Soul Chip, which the Go-ongers place in the Junction Rifle and fire at "Sōsuke." Both souls are returned to their rightful bodies, but Sōsuke's cold remains in the body of Hatsuden Banki, which weakens the beast enough to be beaten by a Speedor-powered Super Highway Buster. Hatsuden Banki then enlarges, but he is still hampered by Sōsuke's cold, which allows EngineOh G6 to scrap him easily. Later on, back on board Ginjiro-go, Sōsuke asks why the other Go-ongers did not realize the body switch sooner than they did. Gunpei's explanation soon devolves into an argument between him, Renn, Saki, and Hant about the cold cures each was administering to "Sōsuke," and they ignore Sōsuke's pleas to get them to stand down.
| 13 | "Tank Full of Chivalry"; Transliteration: "Otokogi Mantan" (Japanese: 侠気マンタン) | Naruhisa Arakawa | May 11, 2008 |
A mysterious childish girl is attacked by Hikigane Banki until the Go-ongers show up to save her when the Savage Machine Beast has the girl in his clutches with the Ugatts covering him. But Go-on Blue grabs the girl from Hikigane Banki, forcing him to run him away, but ends up scratching Renn. After apologizing for accidentally mistaking his intentions, the girl apologizes and introduces herself as "Būkorin". However, Gunpei's words scare Būkorin away for claiming to be from the sky and that she did not give her real name. At Gaiark, the Pollution Ministers try to entertain a mysterious scary-looking yakuza named Gego who offers them many weapons in return for Būkorin. But when he hears that Hikigane Banki failed, Dokkūgo decides to settle this personally after making the Savage Machine Beast his lackey. After seeing Būkorin and Renn together, with the later promising to help her with her troubles, the man reveals himself to be Būkorin's father who wants her to follow in his footsteps rather than living out her dream of a building a theme park. While the other Go-ongers deal with Hikigane Banki, Renn is forced to deal with Gego for Būkorin's sake by putting his own freedom on the line in a three-round match. After both are tied in the first two matches, Renn is forced into a swordsman's duel. In spite of losing, Renn refuses to surrender, sparking Būkorin with his words as she stops the fight and frightens her dad to unconsciousness with her new attitude. Renn then joins the others in defeating Hikigane Banki with a Bus-On-powered Super Highway Buster. However, Hikigane Banki enlarges, only to be scrapped by EngineOh G6. Later, Būkorin thanks Renn as she intends to carry on her father's legacy while living her dream before she and Gego take their leave in a UFO, revealing themselves to be aliens with Renn wishing that he asked about Būkorin's home planet.
| 14 | "Doki Doki Every Day"; Transliteration: "Mainichi Doki Doki" (Japanese: 毎日ドキドキ) | Shō Aikawa | May 18, 2008 |
After a night of working, a tired Hant crosses paths with Kama Banki who traps him among the other weary people that he captured in his hot spring. The others arrive to fight the Savage Machine Beast until they learn of Hant's fate as Kegalesia arrives to order her monster to take the other Go-ongers into his spring illusion to get them out of the way. However, Go-on Red accidentally deflects the steam at a martial artist named Mantan Fujio, dispelling the hot spring illusion to Kegalesia's shock as she and her lacky retreat when the Go-ongers use a High Buster/Cowl Laser combo on them. While scolded by the others for his daze, Hant is drafted by Fujio to be his student in with Sōsuke following them to Fujio's Natural Fighting School, where Hant has to give up worldly desires. Meanwhile, refusing to accept her humiliating defeat by a normal human, Kegalesia assumes a guise of "Rena Kegareshi" to learn under Fujio to perfect her monster, with Hant falling in love with her while neither is aware of the other's true identity. Later that night, has Kama Banki undergo what she learned from Fujio to reach enlightenment as the other Go-ongers arrive to see Hant's training. However, the three Go-ongers encounter the enlightened Kama Banki, trapping them in his perfected illusion. When Sōsuke learns this, he takes Hant before the young man could properly admit her feelings, with a confused/upset Kegalesia discarding her disguise once realizing who Hant is to sic Kama Banki on the two. Though Hant is sucked into Kama Banki, Hant's love for Rena allowed him to break the illusion and free everyone. Taking center, Go-on Green battles Kama Banki single-handedly, using the Super Highway Buster on his own to take the Savage Machine Beast out. When Kama Banki enlarges, Go-on Green sets the Engine Souls in the wrong Casts, piloting "Speedor"-Birca as the mixed-Engines combine into EngineOh G6 and scrap Kama Banki. After the fight, Hant returns to Fujio's dojo, saddened to find Rena gone, as a still-confused Kegalesia is annoyed of being called "pure" by Hant.
| 15 | "Engine Stall"; Transliteration: "Enjin Sutōru" (Japanese: 炎神ストール) | Junki Takegami | May 25, 2008 |
The Go-ongers attempt to enjoy a picnic, with Sōsuke having horrible luck after his coin landed on tails, until Bomper alerts them to a Barbaric Dohma arriving to the Human World. When EngineOh G6 arrives to counter, the Engines reveal the pilot of the ship to be Gaiark's greatest military genius, Land Pollution Vice Minister Hiramechimedes. In spite of its components being frozen up in battle, EngineOh G6 fights Hiramechimedes who overpowers it single-handedly with his Barbaric Dohma SP before leaving to find Yogostein. As Hiramechimedes appears to his master Yogostein, the Go-ongers learn from the Engines of Hiramechimedes as the Vice Minister himself arrives to confront the Engines, who all use the Mantan Guns to retreat into the Ginjiro-go as the Go-ongers decide to fight him on their own. Deciding to finish them off, Hiramechimedes brings out the Barbaric Dohma SP as the Go-ongers escape in their van. Soon after, Sōsuke confronts Speedor and the other Engines by reminding them they're partners, encouraging them to confront their phobia. After Saki comes with a plan and a night of training, EngineOh G6 challenges the Barbaric Dohma SP, breaking up into its components and Speedor manages to scrap the Barbaric Dohma SP, which splits up as well. But just as all seemed lost, two new Engines emerge: Toripter and Jetras. The two new heroes scrap the Barbaric Dohma SP in a massive dog fight and take their leave, but not even the Go-ongers' Engines know anything about these strange allies.
| 16 | "Honor Recovery"; Transliteration: "Meiyo Bankai" (Japanese: 名誉バンカイ) | Junki Takegami | June 1, 2008 |
At the Ginjiro-go, the Go-ongers talk about the strange new Engines and their intent, with Carrigator knowing only that they are of the Wing Race. However, Hiramechimedes returns to Yogostein to reveal his first confrontation with the Wing Engines as Kegalesia sends out her enlarged Oil Banki to cover the city's roads in oil to reduce friction for EngineOh G6. With the Go-ongers and Engines unable to protect themselves from the Savage Machine Beast, Toripter and Jetras arrive and tell the "amateur" Engines to butt out as they drive off the monster on their own without trouble. After the battle, the two flying Engines leave after arrogantly revealing that they chased Hiramechimedes out of Machine World prior to the Engines driving the Pollution Ministers out. Annoyed with the new Engines belittling them, the Go-ongers and their Engines resolve to prove themselves to the Wing Engines, testing out many complex ideas to counter Oil Banki's abilities until Sōsuke comes across a simple idea when he accidentally spills a bottle of cooking oil. Meanwhile, Hiramechimedes borrows and upgrades Oil Banki. When the Wing Engines arrive, Hiramechimedes arrives in a new Barbaric Dohma SP to reveal Oil Banki's wing upgrade, allowing him to overpower the Wing Engines as the Go-ongers arrive in EngineOh and GunBirOh with their Go-on Mops to wash away the oil before they all scrap the beast. Soon after, in spite of proving themselves to Toripter and Jetras, their mysterious partners are far from impressed.
| 17 | "Wings of Justice"; Transliteration: "Seigi no Tsubasa" (Japanese: 正義ノツバサ) | Junki Takegami | June 8, 2008 |
While being happy of their last victory and having won the Wing Engines' respect, the Go-ongers learn that Happa Banki has appeared in the city with an army of Ugatts to use his 64 sticks of dynamite to destroy buildings one after another, causing the city to fall into panic. When Sōsuke and gang are unable to the fight the crisis, the Sutō siblings arrive to back the Go-ongers up, revealing themselves as the partners of Toripter and Jetras: The Go-on Wings, who easily defeat the Ugatts without trouble and drive Happa Banki away. However, in spite of offering their friendship, the Go-ongers are ignored by the Go-on Wings as Toripter and Jetras arrive to pick their partners up. The Go-ongers take the rejection hard as the Sutō siblings later arrive to tell the Go-ongers of Gaiark's eventual attack at Mt. Kurogane before Toripter tells them about how they had reached the Human World and were saved by the Sutō siblings, who were taken to Machine World to become Elite warriors. Despite being told to stay back, the Go-ongers head to Mt. Kurogane and fall into the trap created by the Land Pollution Team of Yogostein, Hiramechimedes, and Happa Banki, who captured them with their team attack. But at the last second, the Go-on Wings arrive in the Wing Engines. After taking out the Ugatts, the Go-on Wings overwhelm Hiramechimedes with their Rocket Daggers before he escapes with Yogostein. With their finishing attack, they also defeat Happa Banki. When he tries to enlarge, he finds that his Bikkurium module was removed by Go-on Gold in an unexpected moment prior to the deathblow, and then he explodes. Though the Go-ongers were thanked by the people despite being not able to do anything, they felt useless since they were saved by Go-on Wings, with Hiroto telling them they should change their mind about being heroes. An enraged Sōsuke confronts them, but the duo just ignore him and leave, with the rest of the Go-ongers feeling depressed.
| 18 | "Commoner Hero"; Transliteration: "Shomin Hīrō" (Japanese: 庶民ヒーロー) | Junki Takegami | June 15, 2008 |
The newest BankiJyu, Vacuum Banki, is dispatched to take down the Sutō siblings. Meanwhile, Miu, curious about what makes the Go-ongers "pathetic," drops in on the still-depressed Go-ongers. She treats the gang to a meal at a fancy restaurant and takes them shopping. Sōsuke and Miu butt heads the whole time, and she decides that she needs to work on him some more. Sōsuke refuses to follow Miu's plan and eventually deserts her. Meanwhile, Vacuum Banki's attempts to take out Hiroto are repeatedly unsuccessful, thanks to Hiroto's vigilance, so he is instructed to go after Miu instead. Hiroto senses that Miu is in danger, and rushes to find her. He runs into Sōsuke, who tells him that Vacuum Banki has kidnapped Miu and taken her to Mt. Kurogane. Hiroto, refusing Sōsuke's help, heads off. At Mt. Kurogane, where Miu has been tied up, Vacuum Banki demands Go-On Gold's Wing Trigger as ransom. As Hiroto agonizes over whether he should comply, Sōsuke arrives, offering his Go-Phone and Change Soul to Vacuum Banki and demanding to take Miu's place. Vacuum Banki gleefully takes Sōsuke's equipment, but refuses to release Miu. Sōsuke, enraged, attacks Vacuum Banki, buying Hiroto time to change Go-on Gold and rescue Miu, who watches Sōsuke reclaim all of their transformation gear. Together, Go-On Red, Go-On Gold, and Go-On Silver defeat Vacuum Banki using the Mantan Gun and the Wing Boosters. Vacuum Banki enlarges just as GunBirOh, BearRV, and Bus-on arrive. Speedor is transported to Go-on Red, and EngineOh is formed. Vacuum Banki, however, puts up a formidable fight against GunBirOh and EngineOh. Toripter and Jetoras join the fight and are convinced to join with EngineOh to form EngineOh Jetripter, who easily scraps Vacuum Banki.
| 19 | "Gunpei's True Intentions"; Transliteration: "Gunpei no Honne" (Japanese: 軍平ノホンネ) | Jun'ichi Miyashita | June 22, 2008 |
Waiting for the Go-on Wings, the Go-ongers wonder why their letter of joining forces as so urgent. But when the Go-on Wings arrive, it turns out that Gunpei is the one behind it, hoping he and the Go-on Wings are on the same page as pros compared to the younger members. However, Hiroto is unimpressed as he and Miu walk off to Gunpei's dismay, refusing to give up. While Gunpei is working on another letter, Hant reveals to the others of the "My Best Hero" database on his cell to the other Go ongers, revealing Go-on Black at the bottom of popularity. As Hant vows to do something about this and make Gunpei the best, Nokogiri Banki begins his attack on the city with the Go-on Wings arriving and both teams arguing who fights the Savage Machine Beast. While the others go to save the people in a crumbling building, Go-on Green has Go-on Black assist the Go-on Wings, with his interference allowing the Savage Machine Beast to escape as the building collapses. The incident and the Go-on Wings' words left Gunpei in the dumps, as he proceeds to train himself to win the Go-on Wings' attention, Hant disguising himself as a clown on stilts to call the monster out and playing keep away with him until Go-on Black arrives. But once the others arrive, Nokogiri Banki runs off with Hant revealing his reason as Sōsuke tells Gunpei being a Go-onger is more important that being a pro. Though annoyed and disheartened by the revelation, Gunpei remembers that he plunged into becoming a Go-onger in the first place. By the time Nokogiri Banki attacks another building, Go-on Black manages to overpower the Savage Machine Beast on his own while revealing Nokogiri Banki's weakness to the Go-on Wings' surprise. While Go-on Black and the others save children, Go-on Green and the Go-on Wings defeat Nokogiri Banki, who enlarges and is scrapped by EngineOh G6 with the Wing Engines' aid. The Go-ongers celebrate after learning Gunpei's number one on the database, though Hiroto is feeling uneasy. Meanwhile, Hiramechimedes has Nokogiri Banki's remains brought back to Hellgailles Palace to be rebuilt stronger and more powerful, while a giant flying Engine arrives on Earth.
| 20 | "Sibling Battle!?"; Transliteration: "Kyōdai Batoru!?" (Japanese: 兄妹バトル！？) | Naruhisa Arakawa, Junko Kōmura | July 6, 2008 |
While Miu is out shopping, Hiroto is at a café with a blonde woman when he is contacted by his mentor. Saki sees Hiroto trying to rebuff the woman and mistakenly assumes that they are in an embrace. Suddenly, Nokogiri Banki, now rebuilt as Chainsaw Banki, arrives to destroy the city. The dust cloud created by Chainsaw Banki's destruction renders the Go-ongers unable to locate him. The Go-on Wings arrive as the dust settles, and each of the Go-ongers reveal that they have seen Hiroto out with one of at least five different women. Miu is upset by the news as Chainsaw Banki escapes after gathering some information Hiramechimedes needs. Miu later discovers that each woman had been exhorting Hiroto to pursue various alternative careers, and Hiroto had rejected all their offers in order to be a hero. Feeling that she has ruined her brother's life and derailed his future, Miu rushes off to battle the Gaiark on her own. The next day, the Go-ongers find Chainsaw Banki making sawdust as part of Hiramechimedes' plan. An agitated Go-on Silver joins the Go-ongers as Chainsaw Banki cloaks himself in a cloud of sawdust. Go-on Silver is goaded by Chainsaw Banki into firing at him, which she does, igniting the sawdust just as Hiroto arrives. He reassures Miu that he fights as Go-on Gold not out of obligation to her, but because he truly wants to. The Sutō siblings reconcile as their instructor, the giant Engine Jum-bowhale, arrives. After putting out the flames, Jum-bowhale deals with Hiramechimedes and the Barbaric Dohma SP swarm. The Go-on Wings battle Chainsaw Banki together and defeat him. Chainsaw Banki is enlarged as Hiramechimedes escapes. Jum-bowhale calls Hiroto and Miu to join him, and the siblings bring Toripter and Jetras to the battlefield to form SeikuOh with their instructor. Chainsaw Banki is outmatched and scrapped by SeikuOh. Afterwards, Miu exuberantly promises to support Hiroto more, which unnerves him somewhat.
| 21 | "Childish Guys"; Transliteration: "Yōchi na Yatsura" (Japanese: 幼稚ナヤツラ) | Junki Takegami | July 13, 2008 |
With Jum-bowhale now in the Human World, he decides to bring together the Go-ongers and the Go-on Wings with a special training session by pitting EngineOh and GunBirOh against SeikuOh. Despite the failure after both robots crash, Jum-bowhale does not lose hope in the Go-ongers, much to Hiroto's dismay. As the Go-ongers are treated to a meal by Jum-bowhale, Fūsen Banki appears and starts giving away his smog-filled balloons to children. The Go-ongers run ahead to the smog-covered city, unable to hurt Fūsen Banki as the Go-on Wings arrive and manage to drive him off. Soon after, Jum-bowhale sneaks on board the Ginjiro-go to personally take the Go-ongers under his wing to lecture them, revealing himself as Bomper's creator. At Hellgailles Palace, Yogostein orders Hiramechimedes to set up a decent plan that will work, telling him it's his last chance to redeem the Land Pollution branch. When the Go-ongers arrive upon being detected, Fūsen Banki carries out Hiramechimedes' plan by inflating Bomper. But like before, the Go-ongers' attacks have no effect until they use their Go-on Shoot to weaken him before using a Jum-bowhale-powered Super Highway Buster to take Fūsen Banki out until he enlarges. While Fūsen Banki targets Bomper to heavy damage EngineOh and GunBirOh, Go-on Gold battles Hiramechimedes in a one-on-one battle. After the Go-on Wings' attack knocks him away, they form SeikuOh to scrap Fūsen Banki as he is about to smash Bomper, who is restored to his normal self. Jumbowhale later thanks the Go-ongers for protecting his creation while confusing the Go-on Wings. As for Hiramechimedes, he begs for Yogostein's forgiveness as the Pollution Minister no longer acknowledges him as his right-hand man.
| 22 | "Final Request"; Transliteration: "Saigo no Nozomi" (Japanese: 最後ノノゾミ) | Junki Takegami | July 20, 2008 |
After being mortally wounded by Yogostein, Hiramechimedes goes on the run with Bōseki Banki chasing him down to finish the job. Meanwhile, the Sutō siblings question Jum-bowhale for having Bomper modify the Wing Engine casts before they encounter Hiramechimedes. By the time the Go-on Teams arrives, they see the wounded Hiramechimedes being attacked with the Go-ongers arriving to his aid too late as Bōseki Banki knocks him off a cliff. The Go-ongers follow Hiramechimedes' oil trail to find him, but he's too wounded to attack them and beyond Bomper's medical skills. Seeing that he's to shut down soon, Hiramechimedes as a last request: to settle things with Hiroto in a plane race between his Barbaric Dohma SP and Toripter with Hellgailles Palace as the goal. Sōsuke, feeling for the Vice Minister, arrives to the Sutō residence to beg for Hiroto to honor the final request, providing Hiramechimedes' map to Gaiark's base as a proof of good will. Though reluctant, Hiroto arrives and Hiramechimedes thanks him as the two enter their flying machines for a high-speed flying race. However, once at "Hellgaille Palace", Hiramechimedes reveals both it and his wounds to be an illusion in order to regain his honor and title, fighting Go-on Gold one-on-one as Bōseki Banki undergoes "Original Industrial Revolution". But, Hiroto expected the trap as Miu arrives with Jetras and Jum-bowhale as they all form SeikuOh. However, Hiramechimedes uses the island's storm-ridden environment to ground them for Bōseki Banki to capture them. But before Bōseki Banki can land the death blow, EngineOh and GunBirOh arrive and attack Bōseki Banki unaware of Hiramechimedes' betrayal until they free SeikuOh. Infuriated of being played, the Go-ongers viciously attack Bōseki Banki and Hiramechimedes, with the Go-on Wings realizing Jum-bowhale's reasons for supporting the Go-ongers. As a result, the Go-on Wings execute with the Go-ongers the G9 Formation that Bomper was working on, combining all nine Engines into EngineOh G9 who scraps Bōseki Banki and mortally wounds Hiramechimedes. As the Go-on teams are all working together, a damaged Hiramechimedes walks off bent on revenge.
| 23 | "Reckless Flash"; Transliteration: "Bōsō Hirameki" (Japanese: 暴走ヒラメキ) | Kenji Konuta | July 27, 2008 |
While out shopping, Hiroto is followed by Sōsuke as he wants get the teams more on the same page, though the two were total opposites, until Hiroto senses Hiramechimedes as he calls the Go-on teams out. Though intent on killing the Go-ongers to reclaim his honor, Hiramechimedes attempts uses his new attack, only to be forced to retreat. But bent on repaying Yogostein for recognizing him and naming him his Vice Minister, Hiramechimedes reaches the conclusion of following the Go-ongers' example and rely solely on power. To that end, Hiramechimedes sneaks back into Hellgaille Palace and infuses himself with a hundred times the normal amount of Bikkurium amidst Yogostein's warning that Bikkurium's terrible side-effects will kill him. Hiramechimedes' resolution to restore his master's honor is stronger as he takes in the energy overload and evolves into the upgraded and babbling form Detaramedes at the cost of his intelligence much to Yogostein's worry. Calling out the Go-ongers with his newfound power, Detaramedes overwhelms SeikuOh and EngineOh G6 easily and then defeats EngineOh G9 without trouble as he prolongs killing them with Go-on Gold unable to read Detaramedes's moves. But an angered Sōsuke manages to turn the tables as EngineOh G9 grabs Detaramedes and recklessly executes the G9 Grand Prix at close range, though he survives the attack and returns to his normal size as he overpowers Go-on Gold with his opponent still unable to read his senseless attacks. But Go-on Red comes to Go-on Gold's aid and fight Detaramedes, refusing to lose. Realizing that Sōsuke does have a chance due to his own reckless fighting style, Go-on Gold gives Go-on Red his Rocket Booster to help him scrap Detaramedes. But as the Go-on teams take their leave, the Go-on Wings able to finally move on, a shocked Yogostein picks up the Hacalibur from his servant's remains.
| 24 | "First Smile"; Transliteration: "Saisho no Egao" (Japanese: 最初ノエガオ) | Kenji Konuta | August 3, 2008 |
At Hellgailles Palace, Yogostein mourns Hiramechimedes's death as the Vice Minister's ghost appears, frightening the Pollution Ministers. Meanwhile, the Go-ongers are out on a camping trip, stopping at a Shinto shrine by a 1,000-year-old cedar tree to wish for good luck. However, the Ginjiro-go's engine breaks down, stranding the Go-ongers in the middle of the forest, where a spirit is believed to dwell. Saki suddenly sees a small boy hiding in the trees watching them, and follows him, thinking he may be lost. Suddenly, a monster attacks her and she transforms into Go-on Yellow. The monster is not a Savage Machine Beast, however, so Saki's counterattacks are ineffective and she is sent flying. She later finds herself tended to by the mysterious boy and promises to get him back home as the monster attacks them again. Meanwhile, the other Go-ongers are looking for Saki and run afoul of numerous youkai recruited by the ghost of Hiramechimedes, now calling himself Urameshimedes, as he is bent getting his revenge from beyond the grave. Scared out of their wits, Sōsuke, Renn, Hant, and Gunpei run into the Go-on Wings, and all six flee from the summoned onryō and run into Saki. Urameshimedes reveals himself, and admits to summoning the onryō and recruiting the monster Bakki from the Samurai World to battle the Go-ongers for him, with Earth's forest as payment. While the others fight the Ugatts, Saki learns that the boy is actually the very same forest spirit that she once met in her childhood. Bakki arrives as Saki transforms into Go-on Yellow. She defeats Bakki single-handedly with a forest spirit-powered Bullet Crash. As the boy returns to his tree, Urameshimedes possesses Bakki's body, enlarging it. EngineOh G9 is no match for the combo of Urameshimedes's mind and Bakki's power until Saki thinks to use a purified salt-infused G9 Grand Prix to both destroy Bakki and exorcise Urameshimedes. Yogostein resumes grieving, now that Urameshimedes is finally and utterly destroyed. Saki thanks the forest spirit once more for all it has done for her.
| 25 | "Goodbye Mother"; Transliteration: "Okan Sayonara" (Japanese: 母上(オカン)サヨナラ) | Shō Aikawa | August 10, 2008 |
With Hiramechimedes gone for good, the Go-ongers decide to take a trip to the beach as part of their summer vacation. Renn takes them to the inn that belongs to his family, where Gunpei notices that Renn is acting strangely. He follows Renn to a cave in which is hidden the Kōsaka family's Kṣitigarbha (地蔵, Jizō) statue. Kegalesia and Kitaneydas arrive shortly after, having tracked an energy signature coming from the statue. They reveal that the statue is one of them. Renn is shocked and devastated by the revelation. The situation worsens for Renn when the Go-on Wings show up to destroy the statue. He grabs the statue and runs off with it, chased by Kegalesia and Kitaneydas. Jum-bowhale explains to the other Go-ongers that the statue is what remains of the Arelunbra Family, who preceded the Gaiark as the Engines' enemy, and that its revival would be disastrous. Gunpei becomes curious as to why Renn is protecting the statue. Hiroto eventually finds Renn and the statue, as does Gunpei. Hiroto moves to destroy the idol, but Gunpei refuses to allow him, having learned that the statue has sentimental meaning for Renn (as a boy, he prayed and made offerings to the statue daily, until his mother died). While Renn tries to separate the brawling Hiroto and Gunpei, Kegalesia revives the idol as the Arelunbra's Water Pollution Machine Knight Uzumaquixote. Uzumaquixote is ordered to kill Renn, but he finds himself unable to, remembering Renn's kindness to him in his dormant state. Feeling conflicted, Uzumaquixote runs off and into the other Go-ongers. He is more than a match for Go-on Red, Go-on Yellow, and Go-on Green, which forces Renn to cast aside his sentimental feelings. With Go-on Black and Go-on Gold at his side, Go-on Blue defeats Uzumaquixote. The wounded Machine Knight pleads with the Ministers to retrieve his master, Prince Nigorl, from the nearby mountain as he protects them. Moved by Uzumaquixote's resolution, Kitaneydas infuses him with Bikkurium. The enlarged Uzumaquixote proceeds to drain SeikuOh and GunBirOh of their power. Defeat seems imminent for the Go-ongers until Go-on Blue debuts the new Kyu-yu Soul, which recharges SeikuOh and GunBirOh. EngineOh, GunBirOh, and SeikuOh then combine their attacks to scrap Uzumaquixote. Later, the Go-on teams head home, with Renn relieved to put the past behind him and eager to make new memories with his new family.
| 26 | "Love Affair"; Transliteration: "Ren'ai Kankei" (Japanese: 恋愛カンケイ) | Shō Aikawa | August 17, 2008 |
While learning about Nigorl, prince of the Arelunbra, Saki notices that BearRV is blushing. Kegalesia and Kitaneydas manage to find Nigorl zo Arelunbra and revive him, much to the former's chagrin. Nigorl reveals his surprising love of beautiful things, including Kegalesia, as the Go-on Wings arrive. Nigorl summons his Beauty Ugatts to deal with them as he duels the Go-ongers for insulting him. When Go-on Silver intervenes, Nigorl talks a reluctant Kegalesia into teaming up to form the Water Pollution Fusion. The Go-ongers form EngineOh G9 to face the new threat, but find themselves outmatched. Jetras is knocked off EngineOh G9 and BearRV immediately breaks the combination to rush to his side. Upon seeing BearRV, Nigorl is smitten and cancels the fusion with Kegalesia. Later, BearRV admits to Saki that she is in love with Jetras. Saki tries to set up a date for BearRV and Jetras, but Miu refuses to cooperate and unwittingly reveals her feelings for Sōsuke. Nigorl arrives to confess his love to BearRV, who agrees to go with him, to the shock of the female Go-ongers. As he leaves with BearRV, Nigorl tells Miu and Saki that they will settle their fight later. Miu refuses Saki's pleas to help her retrieve BearRV, but Jetras manages to convince Miu to have a change of heart. Meanwhile, Nigorl is making plans to marry BearRV instead of destroying her, much to Kegalesia's anger. Miu and Saki successfully lure Nigorl into the open and trick him into giving up BearRV's Engine Soul by having Jetras masquerade as BearRV by putting his Engine Soul into BearRV's Engine Cast. Once the female Go-ongers reclaim BearRV, the male Go-ongers join the fray. Together, the team dispatch of Nigorl, using a combo Super Highway Buster/Wing Booster. Mortally wounded, Nigorl begs Kegalesia to help him, but she coldly destroys his canister of Bikkurium and walks away, leaving Nigorl to die. Saki and Miu are now happy to help BearRV and Jetras develop their relationship, but BearRV, unnerved by Jetras' earlier "cross-dressing" strategy, has lost interest in him and begins to size up the male Go-ongers and their Engines as potential boyfriends.
| 27 | "Granddaughter Hant!?"; Transliteration: "Magomusume Hanto!?" (Japanese: 孫娘ハント！？) | Junki Takegami | August 24, 2008 |
After a mysterious object lands in the mountains, the Go-ongers head out to investigate. During the search, Hant loses his footing and his Shift Changer, and goes tumbling over the side of a hill. He is found by Osen, an old woman who lives on the mountain, who nurses him back to health. To repay Osen's kindness, Hant helps her move her "treasures," which are nothing more than assorted piles of junk, and learns about Osen's beloved granddaughter. Meanwhile, the other Go-ongers encounter Dowsing Banki, who is also looking for the object. They discover that Hant is missing and, with the help of the Go-on Wings, go search for him. The Go-on teams soon find Hant at Osen's, and are shocked to find him wearing girls' clothing in an effort to resemble Osen's granddaughter. During the confusion, Kitaneydas and Dowsing Banki arrive and capture Osen, along with a small refrigerator, which is revealed to be the object that crashed on the mountain. The refrigerator turns out to be a super weapon that can instantly increase the volume of trash by hundreds of times. Dowsing Banki stays behind to occupy the Go-ongers as Kitaneydas absconds with Osen and the weapon. Go-on Green and the Go-on Wings fight their way past Dowsing Banki to pursue Kitaneydas, who reveals that Osen is actually a science sorceress from the Junk World and the creator of the weapon, which is responsible for the Junk World's current state. Since Osen is the only one who can operate the weapon, Kitaneydas had deceived Osen into thinking that the Human World had declared war on the Junk World in order to bring her to the Human World. As EngineOh Gunpherd battles Dowsing Banki and the Go-on Wings deal with Kitaneydas, Hant fights his way past a horde of Ugatts and begs Osen to not turn on the weapon. Osen seems not to hear Hant's pleas and switches on the weapon. Instead of multiplying, however, the junk piles in the area are turned into flowers, which now also cover all the Gaiark present. Osen scolds Kitaneydas for lying to her. Kitaneydas is forced to retreat as EngineOh G9 finishes off Dowsing Banki. Osen thanks Hant for opening her eyes to the sincerity of the Human World's people, then returns home to the Junk World.
| 28 | "Partner Gunpei"; Transliteration: "Aibō Gunpei" (Japanese: 相棒グンペイ) | Junki Takegami | August 31, 2008 |
People begin disappearing mysteriously throughout the city, with Gunpei frantic of the event in spite of disappearances yielding no evidence of Gaiarc involvement until they find the guilty party, Manhole Banki. After the Savage Machine Beast escapes them, the Go-ongers get arrested by the police as suspects in the missing person’s case. Once at jail, the team is released by Gunpei's old partner, Detective Sakyo Kashiwagi, of the Tokyo Metropolitan Police Department, who is also investigating the case as well. After Gunpei explains the situation, Kashiwagi requests Gunpei to be his partner again to investigate the mystery of why Manhole Banki is abducting people, not admitting the culprit's identity. Using Gunpherd's nose to track down one of Manhole's recent victims, Manami, Gunpei and Kashiwagi make their way to the school she works, where Gunpei realized the Gaiark were targeting pen-spinners. Deciding to set up a trap with the Go-on Wings' aid, the Go-ongers disguise themselves to wait out Manhole Banki before he finally makes his move, with Gunpei abducted. After telling the Go-ongers, Kashiwagi admits that Gunpei is just like he was the day he left the police force after he first saw the Go-ongers. While this occurred, once learning the Gaiark's newest scheme to use the pen-spinners to power-up Kitaneydas' Destructive Sound Machine, Go-on Black frees the prisoners before fighting Manhole Banki, destroying the machine as the others arrive to defeat him with Super Highway Buster/Wing Booster combo. Kashiwagi arrives as EngineOh G9 battles the enlarged Manhole Banki, using Gunpherd to take out the manholes before scrapping the Savage Machine Beast. Kashiwagi later thanks Gunpei and Gunpherd for their help in solving the case, with Gunpei being picked on by his team once they learned that Gunpei was never a detective.
| 29 | "Stop Hiroto"; Transliteration: "Hiroto o Tomero" (Japanese: 大翔ヲトメロ) | Shō Aikawa | September 7, 2008 |
After returning from his mourning solitude and soul searching, a raging Yogostein is convinced to rely on his very own power as he goes all out into pouring it into the creation of destructive Hammer Banki to exact his revenge on the Go-ongers. After a failed attempt to work on the newest weapon he and Jum-bowhale have been developing, Hiroto takes a break until Hammer Banki begins his attack. Finding the district in ruins, the Go-ongers encounter Yogostein as he has Hammer Banki attack them before the Go-on Wings arrive. However, Go-on Silver is gravely injured in the fight when she attempted to save her brother from Hammer Banki, with Go-on Gold forced to watch his sister being brutally wounded further until the Go-ongers intervene and Yogostein retreats to re-energize his monster while the other Pollution Ministers express concern for their comrade's state of mind. With Miu on life support, Hiroto vows as he trains himself with the male members following him to talk him to be at his sister's side while learning that the training is for something else that can destroy Hammer Banki. Once Miu regains consciousness, she and Jum-bowhale reveal the project Hiroto has been working on, the Go-Roader GT, though without a working Power Soul is prone to attack everything. As Renn decides to solve the Power Soul issue with Miu's aid, Hiroto arrives to face Yogostein and Hammer Banki, attempting to use the Go-Roader before it started to attack him. However, the other Go-ongers arrive to hold the Go-Roader off so Hiroto can deactivate it. Though Yogostein decides to retreat at the moment, Hammer Banki refuses to run off and enlarges to kill the Go-ongers and his master until Jetras and Bus-on arrive and the teams form EngineOh G9. Once formed, Renn gives Hiroto the completed Tōkon Soul to use on the Go-Roader, enabling it to enlarge and assume Action Mode to weaken Hammer Banki before it and EngineOh G9 scrap him. As Kegalesia and Kitaneydas comfort Yogostein as he realized the downside of his vengeance, the Go-on teams celebrate the Go-Roader's completion as Hiroto gives the new weapon to the Go-ongers after they prove themselves in a group jog.
| 30 | "Friendship's Punch"; Transliteration: "Yūjō no Panchi" (Japanese: 友情ノパンチ) | Shō Aikawa | September 14, 2008 |
Sōsuke is curious as to what will happen when an Engine Soul is set into Go-Roader GT, and uses Speedor as the guinea pig, over the Engine's vehement protests. Speedor's energy is almost completely drained in the test and he becomes furious with Sōsuke for blindly rushing forth. Just then, Straw Banki attacks the city with his Bakuha Drink. The Go-on Wings battle him until he uses his Straw Scattershot missiles on the people. The Go-ongers arrive and help the Go-on Wings battle the Savage Machine Beast, but Go-on Red and Speedor are still arguing over the Go-Roader GT incident. Straw Banki is forced to retreat after he loses his Gai Aqua power-up drink. Sōsuke finds the Gai Aqua, and when he and Renn are examining the bottle, they both accidentally get drenched by the drink, which powers up evil tendencies. The Gai Aqua causes Sōsuke and Renn to lose their sense of justice and, now referring to themselves as Sōnoji and Kōsaka, they start pandering the Go-ongers as a for-profit organization in an insurance scam, much to Saki, Hant, and Gunpei's horror. Sōnoji and Kōsaka abandon their Engine partners and go on a crime spree. Miu tries to run damage control as Hiroto battles Sōnoji and Kōsaka. Hiroto lays out Kōsaka with a punch, reawakening Renn, but Sōnoji escapes. The Go-ongers, minus Go-on Red, and the Go-on Wings Team battle the powered-up Straw Banki and are trapped by him. Meanwhile, Bomper reminds the still-miffed Speedor of why he had chosen Sōsuke to be his partner. Speedor puts himself into the Go-Roader GT and engages the Action Mode to literally beat some sense into Sōnoji. With Sōsuke restored to normal, he and Speedor dub themselves the "Go-on Mach Team," free their teammates, and overpower Straw Banki. Straw Banki enlarges, but Speedor is out of power, so Bus-on and BearRV battle alongside SeikuOh and GunBirOh and eventually scrap Straw Banki. Afterwards, Sōsuke and Renn make amends for their misdeeds, starting with the people they had scammed for insurance money, and the Sutō siblings decide that they too are due apologies.
| 31 | "Idol Debut"; Transliteration: "Aidoru Debyū" (Japanese: 歌姫(アイドル)デビュー) | Naruhisa Arakawa | September 21, 2008 |
The Go-ongers face a mysterious monster who starts feeding on sound waves upon emerging from another dimension. When the Go-on teams attempt to fight the monster, they only end up enlarging it before it falls asleep. To further confuse things, the Pollution Ministers suddenly arrive to play the song "Gaiark Industrial Revolution Declaration." The ministers explain that the monster, whose name is Lumbiaco, is from the Sound World. Lumbiaco feeds on high-pitched sounds to increase its size and only a "beautiful song" can keep it from growing so big that it literally crushes the planet. Unfortunately, the Gaiark's music only served to increase Lumbiaco's size. Hiroto sings a ballad to try to shrink Lumbiaco, and his song initially seems to work, but the monster awakens in a rage afterwards and grows further. When it is determined that only a female voice is able to shrink Lumbiaco, Kitaneydas and Yogostein make matters worse when they dress up as drag queens and try to sing again, and Lumbiaco grows even larger. Hant and Gunpei assemble GunBirOh, who fails to put down the ever-enlarging Lumbiaco. Meanwhile, Saki suggests to Miu and Kegalesia that they should form a 3-girl idol group. Though the three initially clash on how to properly train to become an idol group, Saki, Miu, and Kegalesia eventually come together and, calling themselves G3 Princess, return to the scene and sing "G3 Princess Lap ~PRETTY LOVE☆Limited~" and shrink Lumbiaco back to normal size. After Go-on Yellow, Go-on Silver, and Kegalesia finish the monster off, Saki and Miu are pleased with the newly-formed collaboration, but Kegalesia rejoins Yogostein and Kitaneydas, much to her now-former groupmates' bitter disappointment.
| 32 | "Search for a treasure" Transliteration: "Hihō o Sagase" (Japanese: 秘宝ヲサガセ) | Junki Takegami | September 28, 2008 |
While investigating a faint Gaiark signal at a mountain, the Go-ongers encounter a boy named Hiroshi and his younger sister Miyuki who are helping their archaeologist father Rokuro Kuroiwa in his search for a legendary treasure. Though Rokuro attempts to drive the group out after they caught a glimpse of the map, Sōsuke and Hant decide to help the man in finding his treasure, the Golden Dragon, while the others remained with Hiroshi and Miyuki and learn of Rokuro's dream. But once at the entrance, Drill Banki appears under orders from Yogostein to take the map from Rokuro as the Golden Dragon may be the legendary and extremely powerful Savage Machine Tribesman Horonderthal who came to Earth during the Cretaceous which the minister intends to revive. After over powering Go-on Red and Go-on Green, Drill Banki takes the map from Rokuro and starts drilling his way to the Golden Dragon, closing the entrance. After taking Rokuro back to shack, with the man apologizing to his children for failing them, the Go-ongers promise not to let the Gaiark rob him of his dream. With Rokuro's knowledge of the area, the Go-ongers find an alternate way into the tunnels and use the Super Highway Buster/Wing Booster combo to take out Drill Banki. However, the attack reveals the Golden Dragon, with Drill Banki enlarging as EngineOh G9 is formed to stop him from taking the Golden Dragon. But just as it is about to win with the Go-Roader's help, the Golden Dragon whirls to life and emerges from the cave, revealed not to be the Horonderthal but a trio of train Engines as they ram into EngineOh G9 before driving off Drill Banki and then flies off with Rokuro and his children watching the Golden Dragon taking its leave. Though the family thanked them for making their dream come true, the Go-ongers decide to find the mysterious Engines.
| 33 | "Primeval Engines"; Transliteration: "Genshi Enjin" (Japanese: 原始エンジン) | Junki Takegami | October 5, 2008 |
With the damage to Speedor's Engine Cast from the mysterious Engines intervening in the fight between EngineOh G9 and Drill Banki rendering him unable to enlarge to help in combination for a while, an agitated Sōsuke runs off after learning from Carrigator that they may be ancient Engines. However, Sōsuke runs into Drill Banki who is also in a bad mood and is reluctantly sent by Yogostein to find the ancient Engines as well. During their battle, the ancient Engines arrive on the scene in a hit-and-run as Go-on Red chases after them, finding them resting in an abandoned switchyard. While this occurred, the others set up a plan to lure the Ancient Engines out by having SeikuOh and GunBirOh spar until a vexed Drill Banki decides to take out his frustrations for Yogostein out on the two combinations, BearRV, and Bus-on. Learning that his friends are in danger after seeing the Ancient Engines have no intent to trust humans, Sōsuke decides to fight on his own in a battle where he has no chance to win. However, Go-on Red's determination and Speedor's pleas for his ancestors to give humans a chance touched Kishamoth as he takes T-Line and K-Line to battle Drill Banki at Go-on Red's side, forming KyoretsuOh to scrap the Savage Machine Beast as Yogostein finally realizes the Engines are not the Horonderthal. Soon after the fight, the ancient Engines become Sōsuke's secondary partners.
| 34 | "Devilish Woman"; Transliteration: "Akuma na Onna" (Japanese: 悪魔ナオンナ) | Junki Takegami | October 12, 2008 |
Refusing to give up his dream, Yogostein takes his leave to find the Horonderthal personally while Kitaneydas sends Heater Banki to put the city in a heatwave incognito. Gunpei, taking a taxi only to be thrown aside by a beautiful woman, notices Heater Banki and pursues him as the other male Go-ongers arrive. Even with the Go-on Wings’ help, they are no match for the Savage Machine Beast's fiery attacks as Heater Banki runs off to hide off. Suddenly, the woman who took Gunpei's taxi returns with all the guys but Gunpei fawning over her, with Saki revealing her to be her older sister, Sanae. Saki reveals to Gunpei all of the nasty things Sanae did to her when they were younger and he takes Sanae to convince her to redeem herself as the older sister as a favor to drive her away for Saki. However, Sanae reveals she came to Tokyo to apologize to Saki for all the nasty things she had done to her. Seeing that Gunpei has a positive effect on her sister, Saki sets him up with Sanae as the other Go-ongers look for Heater Banki, who is making his way towards the gas tanks to blow up the city. When Go-on Red, Blue, and Green are unable to handle him alone, Saki and Gunpei leave Sanae with the keys to the Ginjiro-go to get the RV out of harm's way as they arrive to help. After being frozen by the Go-on Wings, Heater Banki enlarges as EngineOh G9 attempts to keep him from overheating the gas tanks before collapsing from being overheated. The tables turn as Go-on Red uses the Ancient Engines to freeze Heater Banki and form KyoretsuOh to scrap the Savage Machine Beast. However, the Horonderthal is finally unearthed by Yogostein, going on a rampage after displaying his power to the Go-on Teams. To make things worse, Saki and Gunpei find out that Sanae tricked them and stole the Ginjiro-go, selling it off with the Go-ongers unable to buy it back and Gunpei under Sanae's power to Saki's dismay.
| 35 | "Engines' Bonds"; Transliteration: "Enjin no Kizuna" (Japanese: 炎神ノキズナ) | Jun'ichi Miyashita | October 19, 2008 |
While Renn repairs the Engine Casts, the Ancient Engines give their contemporaries the history of their feud with Horonderthal; they had followed the Ancient Machine Caveman to the Human World during the age of the dinosaurs and had buried Horonderthal, along with themselves, to spare the dinosaurs from further suffering. When Horonderthal resumes his rampage, causing mass chaos in the city with Horonden Waves, Go-on Red intercepts him in KyoretsuOh. However, Horonderthal's rampage was a trap planned by Yogostein for something more sinister; he upgrades Horonderthal with a special device that enables the Machine Caveman to take control of KyoretsuOh, forcing Go-on Red from the cockpit. As Go-on Red battles Yogostein one-on-one, GunBirOh and SeikuOh battle Horonderthal and the berserk KyoretsuOh. Go-on Blue and Go-on Yellow arrive with their Engine partners and Speedor's Engine Cast. They and Go-on Red assemble EngineOh, who engages KyoretsuOh while Horonderthal defeats GunBirOh and SeikuOh, breaking the two combinations apart. EngineOh and KyoretsuOh both connect with devastating punches that break the two combinations and frees KyoretsuOh from Horonderthal's control. The Ancient Engines suggest to the modern Engines that all twelve of them come together in the G12 Formation. The resulting EngineOh G12 towers over Horonderthal and scraps him easily. The Go-on teams' victory is short-lived, however, as the Egg Yogostein had managed to implant in Go-on Red during their earlier duel hatches; as his teammates watch in horror and disbelief, Sōsuke collapses and is entombed in rust. Yogostein picks up the upgrade that he had crafted for Horonderthal and uses it on himself, vowing to destroy the Human World.
| 36 | "Sōsuke… Eternally"; Transliteration: "Sōsuke… Towa ni" (Japanese: 走輔…トワニ) | Jun'ichi Miyashita | October 26, 2008 |
After Sōsuke is encased in rust by Yogostein's attack and presumed dead, the other Go-ongers and the Go-on Wings grieve over him and vow to defeat Yogostein. Meanwhile, Yogostein, relishing his Horonderthal upgrade, is out terrorizing the city. The Go-ongers and Go-on Wings confront the Pollution Minister, but their rage at Sōsuke's condition affects their fighting effectiveness, and they are easily defeated. To add insult to injury, Yogostein snatches away everyone's Change Souls, depowering the heroes. Bomper and the Ancient Engines arrive just in time to ferry the team to safety, but everyone is depressed by the loss. However, their memories of Sōsuke's finest moments inspire them to confront Yogostein once more, despite their inability to transform. Though outmatched, the team manages to severely wound Yogostein with his own YogoSpear before he enlarges. Renn sends for the Engine Casts. Despite Sōsuke's absence, Speedor gladly joins the battle. Everyone boards their respective Engines, knowing full well that their civilian forms will be severely tested. When Renn spots the Change Souls inside the wound on Yogostein's body, Speedor throws himself at the Pollution Minister and pins him down long enough for the Go-on teams to climb inside and reclaim their Change Souls. The Go-on teams transform and assemble EngineOh G12, which quickly takes Yogostein down and undoes the rust attack he had unleashed on the city. Yogostein, further injured and back to normal size, is still determined to use the now-damaged Horonderthal upgrade key. He attempts to flee, but he is confronted by a revived and extremely enraged Sōsuke. As his teammates watch anxiously, Sōsuke transforms into Go-on Red and engages Yogostein in a one-on-one duel which ends with Sōsuke destroying Yogostein. Kegalesia and Kitaneydas mourn the loss of their comrade as the Go-on teams celebrate Sōsuke's recovery.
| 37 | "Engine Banki!?"; Transliteration: "Enjin Banki!?" (Japanese: 炎神バンキ！？) | Kenji Konuta | November 2, 2008 |
As the Go-on teams celebrate Sōsuke's recovery and their victory over Yogostein, Renn is inside the Ginjiro-go, hard at work on a new weapon. While Renn's back is turned, the Ancient Engine Souls jump aboard Sōsuke's RC truck and flee the Ginjiro-go. Kegalesia speaks at the Gaiarks' wake for Yogostein, only to be interrupted by a commotion caused by Kitaneydas, who had promised to avenge Yogostein, and had created a powerful Savage Machine Beast to do just that. The Go-ongers finally discover that the Ancient Engines are gone, and they split up, frantically searching the city for them. Renn's search leads him to the Sutōs' villa, where he finds the Ancient Engines hiding out. Kishamoth, T-line, and K-line blame themselves for the events that led to Sōsuke's brush with death and had run away, feeling unworthy of being partners with the Go-ongers. Renn tries to assure the Ancient Engines that no one, especially Sōsuke, blames them for anything, and presents the weapon he created for them, which he calls the Kankanbar. Meanwhile, the other Go-ongers run afoul of Kitaneydas and Kegalesia riding in Engine Banki, a Barbaric Machine Beast based on EngineOh itself. The Ancient Engines are still not convinced that they can help, so Hiroto volunteers to talk to them as Renn and Miu leave with Bus-on and Jetras to aid GunBirOh, BearRV, and Speedor against Engine Banki. Unfortunately, Engine Banki is more than GunBirOh, Go-Roader, and EngineOh Jetras can handle, and he breaks the combinations. The Go-ongers remain undaunted, using everything at their disposal to battle Engine Banki. As everyone at the Sutō villa watches the Go-ongers fight valiantly, Hiroto pours out his heart, telling the Ancient Engines that, in the same way that they had protected the dinosaurs, he and his friends will risk their lives to protect those they care about. The Ancient Engines finally understand and agree to fight side-by-side with the Go-on teams. Go-on Gold arrives at the battleground and uses the Kankanbar, powered by T-line and K-line, to shrink Engine Banki and force Kitaneydas and Kegalesia to abandon ship. Go-on Gold hands off the Kankanbar to Go-on Red, who links the new weapon with his Mantangun and uses the Kankan Mantangun, powered by all three Ancient Engines, to scrap the Savage Machine Beast. Afterwards, the gang admire the Kankanbar and are happy that the Ancient Engines have returned to the fold, but when Toripter announces that Hiroto's "fiery persuasion" was what brought the Ancient Engines around, the attention shifts; everyone begs to know what exactly the normally stoic and aloof Hiroto had said, as he tries to modestly shrug it off as no big deal.
| 38 | "The Maidens' Seriousness"; Transliteration: "Otome no Honki" (Japanese: 乙女ノホンキ) | Junki Takegami | November 9, 2008 |
Shower Banki appears to cause a downpour of acid rain in the city. The Go-on teams arrive and blast her away effortlessly, puzzled that the rainwater apparently had no effect. However, while everyone is drying off, Saki notices that Sōsuke and the other boys are petrified. Miu shows up shortly after, carrying an equally paralyzed Hiroto on her back. Worse yet, all the male Engine Souls are similarly frozen. When Shower Banki resumes her attack after receiving a supply of perfected acid rainwater, BearRV exhorts the anxious Saki and Miu to fight. The two show up to challenge Shower Banki and accidentally let slip that all the boys are frozen. After handily beating Go-on Yellow and Go-on Silver, Shower Banki gleefully reports the news to Kegalesia, who assigns Shower Banki a new mission; find the Ginjiro-go and eliminate the frozen Go-ongers. When Barbaric Dohmas attack the city, BearRV drags Saki into battle against them. Her confidence boosted after besting the Barbaric Dohmas, Saki sets a trap for Shower Banki and her horde of Ugatts and drives the Ginjiro-go away when the trap is successfully sprung, buying much needed time. That night, Saki snaps Miu out of her crisis of confidence and together, they promise the boys that they will take care of everything. The next day, Shower Banki and her Ugatts corner the Ginjiro-go. Saki and Miu are no match for the Ugatts, who climb aboard the Ginjiro-go and attack the boys. However, what the Ugatts thought were the boys were actually mannequins from a women's clothing shop; the boys are actually dressed up as the mannequins and on display in the shop window. BearRV, in the Go-Roader, ambushes the Ugatts and sends them flying from the Ginjiro-go. Saki and Miu transform and join BearRV as the Go-on Princess team to beat Shower Banki. Shower Banki enlarges just as BearRV runs out of energy and is about to rain on the Go-on Princess team when they are saved by SeikuOh, GunBirOh, Speedor, Bus-on, and the Ancient Engines. Two new formations, SeikuOh Gunpherd and GunBirOh Jetras, are formed, and together, they scrap Shower Banki. Afterwards, the boys pamper Saki and Miu as a reward for their hard work.
| 39 | "Nostalgic Children"; Transliteration: "Kyōshū no Kodomo" (Japanese: 郷愁ノコドモ) | Shō Aikawa | November 16, 2008 |
Kitaneydas uses Yatai Banki to capture children in his Festival Space on a daily basis across the city before expanding it worldwide. After hearing eyewitness accounts of the children disappearing from friends and siblings, Gunpei and Hant are bewitched by their own childhood memories as they end up getting trapped in the Festival Space themselves. It is there the two meet a pair of brothers named Harunosuke and Akinosuke as Yatai Banki reveals himself to attack them. But Kishamoth breaks the space, with the Go-on teams fighting Yatai Banki as the brothers run into Kishamoth and drive off with him as Gunpei and Hant get it. As Yatai Banki escapes, Gunpei and Hant learn the brothers are from the Samurai World as Kishamoth reverts to Engine Cast and Engine Soul. Meanwhile at Hellgailles Palace, the Gaiark Ministers are visited by a familiar pair of Yōma who ask them to get the two brothers and the sword the young brother carries. While Gunpei notices the sword on Akinosuke's back, the brothers run off as the two try to come after them. But Yatai Banki blocks their way at the two are forced to fight him as the others arrive while the Gaiark Ministers trick the brothers into trusting them. But when they see through the Ministers' deception at the last minute, the brothers run back to the Go-ongers and return Kishamoth's Engine Soul as Go-on Red gives Go-on Green and Go-on Black the Kankanbar to defeat Yatai Banki and free the children. When Yatai Banki enlarges, he traps EngineOh and SeikuOh in Festival Space games as GunBirOh frees them and three beat him senselessly before scrapping him. As Harunosuke apologizes for his distrust, he reveals the sword Akinosuke carries to belong to the Go-ongers' old friend Retsu-Taka, as Engine Dai-Shogun lands in the middle of the city still in its petrified state.
| 40 | "Shogun Revival"; Transliteration: "Shōgun Fukkatsu" (Japanese: 将軍フッカツ) | Shō Aikawa | November 23, 2008 |
After Engine Dai-Shogun crashes on Earth, the Go-on teams head to ground zero as Sōsuke remembered their adventure in the Samurai World and how the Honōshū Warriors died fighting Maki as Engine Dai-Shogun. However, Harunosuke reveals that the sword he and brother were protecting actually holds part of Retsu-Taka's soul that can control Engine Dai-Shogun. By then, the Yōma Rairaiken and Gokugokumaru arrive to get the sword as Go-on Teams fight them. But a surprise visit by the Human World counterpart of Retsu-Taka Shishi-No-Shi and Tsuki-no-Wa results in the revived Engine Dai-Shogun acting on the man's will to attack the city out of rage. As EngineOh, GunBirOh, and SeikuOh attempt to stop the stronger Engine Dai Shogun, the Yōma backstab the Gaiark Ministers and dump them into the Bikkurium chamber as they reveal their intent to take over the Human World once Engine Dai-Shogun devastates the city. Later, after coming to from the fight, Sōsuke finds "Retsu-Taka" to reason him into stopping this madness, resulting in a fist fight with the man after revealing his reason being to getting back on society for his misfortune in becoming homeless. Seeing he has no choice but to destroy Engine Dai-Shogun if he has to stop the destruction, Go-on Red attempts to form KyoretsuOh when the Yōma stop Go-on Red and he fights the two single-handedly before the others join in the fight, forcing the Yōma to sic Engine Dai-Shogun on them. However, "Retsu-Taka" runs into scene and uses Retsu-Taka's power to break the combination as the Yōma use the Bikkurium vials they took to enlarge and finish the job. However, the primary Go-ongers place their partner Engine Souls into the Wandering Engine Casts to form Engine Dai-Shogun and destroy the two Yōma once and for all while "Retsu-Taka" gives the Engine Sword back to Harunosuke. Soon after, the brothers ride in the Ancient Engines with the Wandering Engine Casts to return to the Samurai World while "Retsu-Taka" begins a new life for himself.
| 41 | "Advanced Childcare"; Transliteration: "Ikuji no Susume" (Japanese: 育児ノススメ) | Jun'ichi Miyashita | November 30, 2008 |
While in the middle of training with Toripter, Hiroto finds a mysterious egg lodged in the Engine's hull and as Toripter tries to lays on the egg to have a little brother of his own. After his Engine is forced to leave his Engine Cast, Hiroto looks after the egg until it hatches, revealing a tadpole-like creature that imprints on Hiroto. He soon learns that he must take care of the creature and keep it happy, as it can produce high-frequency crying that can destroy the city if it is not happy. But Hiroto takes the baby to the Ginjiro-go and there Jum-bowhale reveals to the Go-ongers that baby is a Wameikle from the Braneworld known as Stormy World. Wondering how it got to their dimension, Renn remembers he and Sosuke saw some Ugatts gathering tadpoles and realizes the Gaiark are behind it as an annoyed Miu arrives to demand to know Hiroto's whereabouts. But when the Go-ongers and Miu pound on the Ginjiro-go to talk to him, Wameikle freaks out and hops off with Hiroto in pursuit as the tadpole is captured by the Ugatts, with Hiroto unable to save the baby as Go-on Gold scares it. Hiroto feels bad about not saving Wameikle, with he others offering to fight in his place to save the baby. Things get worse when the Ugatts use their power to forcibly grow Wameikle into its adult form and placed it in a fit of rage to attack the Go-ongers and use its high-frequency screams to break the dimensional barriers so the Stormy World's tornadoes can devastate the Human World. While GunBirOh and KyorestuOh deal with the endless tornado onslaught, a furious Hiroto takes down the Ugatts single-handedly before seeing he has no choice but to fight Wameikle. With the new weapon Renn developed, Hiroto manages to calm Wameikle down with its favorite vegie juice as the Engine Combinations restore the Dimensional Barrier. Hiroto then says goodbye to his "child" as Wameikle returns to the Stormy World, with the Go-ongers provoking Hiroto into chasing them after they call him the team's "father figure".
| 42 | "Campus Secret"; Transliteration: "Gakuen no Himitsu" (Japanese: 学園ノヒミツ) | Junki Takegami | December 7, 2008 |
When Bin Banki starts mixing up recyclables into the regular trash, the Go-ongers easily force him to run with them in pursuit. However, the Go-on Wings find Kegalesia has become a teacher at the nearby Todorokigaoka Private High School. Unable to get into the school, the two report to the Go-ongers with Bomper suggesting one of them to pose as a student to get to the bottom of it. Miu volunteers and goes undercover at the school as a shy girl to find where Kegalesia is. After searching through many school clubs, Miu runs into the prodigy Manabu Yushima, who becomes interested with her and attempts to use the Cupid's Arrow spell to make her love him. Revealed to be in possession of an item from the Braneworld known as the Magic World, Yushima runs off to his sole confident, Kegalesia as the school nurse. After revealing herself, the Minister has Bin Banki get back the Mage's Wand and knocks Miu out to give to Yushima, who returns the favor by upgrading Bin Banki into Mahōbin Banki. As Mahōbin Banki uses his new magic powers to force the Go-ongers to attack each other against their will, Yushima attempts to make Miu his girl only to unable to with his magic. But after convincing him to use his true heart to win her love, Miu arrives with Yushima and the two strip Mahōbin Banki of his magical powers before Go-on Silver defeats him. But when the Industrial Revolutionized Mahōbin Banki is overpowered by EngineOh G9, the combination is broken up by a mysterious figure with Go-on Red using KyoretsuOh to scrap the Savage Machine Beast. Soon after, as Yushima accidentally destroyed his laptop and data he gathered of the magic spells, the Go-ongers were curious about the mysterious sniper who attacked them.
| 43 | "Year-End Big Cleanup"; Transliteration: "Nenmatsu Osōji" (Japanese: 年末オソウジ) | Junki Takegami | December 14, 2008 |
At Hellgaille Palace, Kitaneydas and Kegalesia receive a surprise visit by one of the Gaiark's strongest ministers, Cleaning Minister Kireizky, who had just finished cleaning the Braneworld of Prism World after the Sound and Magic Worlds before coming to the Human World to aid the Ministers in destroying the Go-ongers. After getting the Ginjiro-go ready for Christmas, the Go-ongers respond to the Gaiark sighting and are ambushed by Kireizky's sniping, revealing himself to be the one who sniped them during EngineOh G9's fight against Bin Banki before sending Go-on Red flying after the Go-onger rushes at him. As the Go-on Wings' cover the others' escape and are knocked off themselves, Sōsuke encounters a wounded man in a Santa Claus outfit. After the man proves himself to be the real Santa Claus by showing Sōsuke the Christmas present from his childhood that inspired him to follow his dream to be a racer, Speedor reveals Santa to be from another Braneworld, Christmas World. After being contacted by Bomper while offering to help Santa, Sōsuke takes him to the Ginjiro-go after Kireizky had wrecked all the Christmas decor while defeating the remaining Go-ongers who despair over Kireziky's combo attacks. To fix things, Santa gives the others the inspiring presents from their childhood as Sōsuke sets the tree back up and encourages the others not to give up for the sake of the children with Renn showing interest in Santa's bag. The next day, Kireizky is about to sweep the city of Christmas and its population just as Go-on Red arrives in a Santa Claus outfit to fight him with others popping of the bag to get the Rag Grenade off him as the Speedor-powered Go-Roader makes a hit on the Minister. After defeating him with everything in their arsenal to take out his, the Go-ongers return the bag to Santa. However, Kireizky survived the attack through his Bottomless Wastebin as the Go-ongers stand him down.
| 44 | "Protect Christmas Eve"; Transliteration: "Seiya o Mamore" (Japanese: 聖夜ヲマモレ) | Kenji Konuta | December 21, 2008 |
Surviving the Go-onger's and Go-on Wings' attacks with his Bottomless Wastebin, Kireizky uses it to send them all off to separate directions so he can begin his sweeping of the Human World. Sōsuke, Gunpei, and Renn find themselves in a kindergarten being held hostage by bank robbers, with the three Go-ongers catching the crooks off guard and making a citizen's arrest before making their way to Tokyo Tower to stop Kireizky and blast his waste bin away. However, Kireizky swallows the Dokkirium he gathered from the previous worlds he cleaned to grow bigger as KyoretsuOh forms to fight him with Bus-on and Gunpherd supporting him. Meanwhile, Hiroto and Saki were in a haunted graveyard and are terrorized by ghosts until Saki gives Hiroto the courage to overcome his childhood fear, only to learn that the ghosts they beat up are actually amusement park workers. The two arrive in BearRV and Toripter, forming EngineOh and GunBirOh Toripter. Meanwhile, Hant and Miu help Santa find his Different-Dimension Present Bag, which was mistaken for a garbage bag by garbage men who take it to be incinerated. Miu uses her esper powers and manages to miraculously find the bag before it could be burned. She and Hant arrive in SeikuOh Birca to blast the Ugatts before they carry out Kireizky's plan. With Santa watching, the "Go-on All Stars" overwhelm the Cleaning Minister with their numbers before forming EngineOh G12 to scrap him. Kegalesia and Kitaneydas are dejected that such a strongest minister has been defeated by the Go-ongers, and decide to drink anyway their worries. However, as Santa takes his leave to give presents to the children around the world with the Go-ongers and Go-on Wings offering their aid, Kireizky's wastebin is still intact and active.
| 45 | "Hatsuyume Plans!?"; Transliteration: "Hatsuyume Kikaku!?" (Japanese: 初夢キカク！？) | Miyako Hatano | January 4, 2009 |
After making their New Year's resolutions, the Go-on teams head to Atami Korakuen Hotel for a New Year's party, paid for by the Sutō siblings. While the Engines relax in a Refresh Hole, the primary Engines recap their partners' highlights over the past year. Meanwhile, Kegalesia attempts to bring Yogostein back to life with Kitaneydas' assistance. They begin to recall their comrade's finest moments and strongest minions, but when the recollections give way to the Go-ongers' victories over them, the spell fails miserably. Back at the hotel, the Go-ongers encounter a mysterious child who steals the hair clip right out of Saki's hair. Gunpherd and Birca reminisce over Gunpei and Hant's finest moments, and Kegalesia's second attempt to revive Yogostein likewise ends in failure when she desperately tries to recall more of Yogostein's best moments but can only muster flashbacks of the Go-on All Stars and all the other Engine combinations. Frustrated, Kegalesia leaves Hellgailles Palace to unwind. She ends up at the Atami Korakuen and eventually crosses paths with the Go-on teams. The Go-ongers learn that the child is a lonely Zashiki-warashi. While the Wing Engines talk fondly of the Go-on Wings and their spotlight moments, the teams find the Zashiki-warashi and decide to cheer up the child. To that end, Kegalesia agrees to join the girls for the comeback of G3 Princess. Unfortunately, the show fails to cheer up the Zashiki-warashi, and, to make matters worse, the child calls Kegalesia an old lady. Thoroughly insulted, Kegalesia grows to giant size without using Bikkurium. She begins to throw a tantrum at being called "old lady," but her rampage is short-lived; EngineOh G12 arrives and knocks her far into the distance. Hiroto thinks that they should try to cheer up the Zashiki-warashi again, but this time, the boys will sing. Sōsuke christens the new group G5 Prince, and they make their debut, singing the song, "Holding You Tight♪". The performance is a success, and the child is now smiling broadly. The next day, revealed to be a girl, the Zashiki-warashi greets the teams at the Ginjiro-go as she returns Saki's hair clip and thanks everyone. Meanwhile, Kireizky's Bottomless Wastebin, which Kitaneydas has found and placed in a corner, glows ominously.
| 46 | "Runaway Bomper"; Transliteration: "Iede Bonpā" (Japanese: 家出ボンパー) | Satoko Yoshimoto | January 11, 2009 |
The Go-on Wings battle Dumbbell Banki to prevent him from polluting the air with his CO_{2} breath, with the Savage Machine Beast running off when his Ugatts didn't answer his call. When the Go-ongers learn of this, they turn to Bomper who takes the malfunction hard and believes the team no longer respects him, running away from home. While Saki and Renn look everywhere for him, Bomper runs into Ugatts R and Ugatts L who are equally as fed up with not getting the respect they deserve from the ministers after training to be the controllers of Dumbbell Banki's forearms. While this occurs, the other Go-ongers deal with Dumbbell Banki whose arms are being poorly controlled by Kitaneydas and Kegalesia before ordered to retreat when he's beyond their range of control. However, the Ministers are surprised to see the two Ugatts coming back, though they have set up their own terms of their personal island as payment. Meanwhile, Saki and Renn find Bomper and convince him to come home as he's important by reminding him all the nice things he did for them. By the time the three Go-ongers and the Go-on Wings find him, Dumbbell Banki is able to fight at full power with his Ugatts helpers as Go-on Blue and Go-on Yellow arrive to help their team as the Savage Machine Beast overwhelms the seven. However, Bomper uses Go-on Red's MantanGun to take out the two Ugatts, leaving Dumbbell Banki powerless as the Go-ongers use Super Highway Buster/Wing Booster combo to defeat him before he enlarges, with the Go-Roader and SeikuOh scrapping Dumbbell Banki. But as the Go-ongers welcome Bomper back as he learns that Sōsuke and Renn were talking about the Ginjiro-gou breaking down and that the early failure of detection was in his head, the Gaiark Ministers are in a slump about their latest defeat until a figure emerges from the Bottomless Wastebin, the Gaiark's leader, Crime Minister Yogoshimacritein.
| 47 | "Ministry Shake-Up"; Transliteration: "Naikaku Kaizō" (Japanese: 内閣カイゾウ) | Junki Takegami | January 18, 2009 |
After introducing himself, Yogoshimacritein's Danger Cabinet-Director Chirakasonne appears and explains that Kireizky worked for them in destroying the other Braneworlds. While this occurred, the Go-ongers watch Gunpei chasing after Hant while revealing his goof ball plan to create fake wedding photos to trick his mom until they go investigating the signal Bomper picked up, facing the Ministers and Yogoshimacritein as they declare their manifesto. While the others deal with the Ugatts and the Ministers, Go-on Green and Go-on Black have trouble with Carrigator as he tries to attack Yogoshimacritein head on until Chirakasonne knocks the three back. As Chirakasonne battles the Go-ongers, Carrigator reveals to his partners that it was Yogoshimacritein who destroyed most of the Gian Race. After taking out Chirakasonne, the Go-ongers use a Carrigator-powered Super Highway Buster and Wing Booster combo on Carrigator. But Chirakasonne ingests the attacks and blasts them with his Natural Reversal attack ordering the Ministers to take Yogoshimacritein back to Hellgallies Palace while he continues to pollute the world. While the teams were in a slump, Gunpei and Hant head to a bathhouse to try cheering Carrigator up while both groups try to devise a way to counter Chirakasonne's attack. When Chirakasonne starts destroying the city, the secondary Go-ongers arrive and fire their Carrigator-powered Junction Rifle in a reckless move to allow the Go-ongers' Highway Buster/Wing Booster combo to take out the Cabinet-Director out while in the middle of his attack. However, Chirakasonne ingests the Dokkirium on himself and enlarges to defeat EngineOh and SeikuOh single-handedly. Though still injured from receiving Chirakasonne's attack, Go-on Green and Go-on Black form GunBirOh and battle Chirakasonne, overloading him with their GunBir Grand Prix. But Yogoshimacritein arrives and uses his Justice Dissolution to vaporize GunBirOh, with Gunpei and Hant fading away.
| 48 | "Justice Dissolution"; Transliteration: "Seigi Kaisan" (Japanese: 正義カイサン) | Satoko Yoshimoto | January 25, 2009 |
Horrified by Yogoshimacritein's Justice Dissolution, Sōsuke attempts to avenge Hant and Gunpei with the Go-on Wings holding him back as the Crime Minister leaves to eat, deciding to make use of Kegalesia and Kitaneydas as they try to stay in his good graces with the plan they have in store for the weakened Go-ongers. At the Ginjiro-go, the primary Go-ongers take it hard as Sōsuke venting his rage on Hiroto before he and Miu leave, finding their butler, wanting to bring them to Switzerland on their parents' wishes, at their villa. But the two refuse as they run off sensing Kettei Banki, whom Kitaneydas modeled after every Savage Beast Machine before it and able to use their attacks. The primary Go-ongers arrive, with furious Go-on Red losing it as he fights Kettei Banki on his own before the robot enlarges to maximize damage over the district. While Miu tries to give Renn and Saki back the courage to fight, Hiroto manages to talk Sōsuke into accepting his help before they all regroup and form EngineOh, KyoretsuOh, and SeikuOh to fight Kettei Banki. Though the robot overpowers them all, SeikuOh uses a divide and conquer move to weaken Kettei Banki before scrapping him. A horrified Kegalesia and Kitaneydas run off as Yogoshimacritein arrives and Go-on Red fights him before the Crime Minister erase KyoretsuOh and forces Sōsuke to watch EngineOh get vaporized. But at the last second, SeikuOh pushes EngineOh out of the way and takes the hit as Yogoshimacritein leaves. Before they fade, Hiroto tells Bomper to analyse them while the Go-ongers are forced to see the Go-on Wings fade before their eyes.
| 49 | "Final Battle"; Transliteration: "Saishū Kessen" (Japanese: 最終ケッセン) | Junki Takegami | February 1, 2009 |
With the Go-On Wings and the Ancient Engines now gone, Yogoshimacritein sees the Go-ongers to be no longer a threat and begins the final step of his plan with his Barbaric Dohma Corps. After learning their friends are still alive, but their location unknown, the primary Go-ongers manage to regain their composure in time as they and the Engines charge to take out hundreds of Barbaric Dohmas before combining into EngineOh to finish off the rest before the Engines' time limit takes effect. By that time, Yogoshimacritein arrives with the Ministers to point out the futile attempt by Go-ongers before he orders Kegalesia and Kitaneydas to attack as they show off their full power. Even though they were at a disadvantage, the Go-ongers start using the Rocket Daggers, Bridge Axe, and Cowl Laser to turn the tables. Yogoshimacritein then uses the Ministers as shields to protect himself, before attempting to use them as suicide bombers to take out the Go-ongers. While the Engines recharge, the Go-ongers decide to put off the search for their friends to expand the Gaiark detection system to stop the Barbaric Dohma menace at the source. Tracking the source of the Barbaric Dohmas' arrival, the Go-ongers make their way to Hellgaille Palace in EngineOh. After fighting their way through waves of Ugatts, the Go-ongers are ambushed by the Ministers whom Yogoshimacritein reveals mean nothing more but tools to him. But the two manage to destroy the Bottomless Wastebin that Yogoshimacritein was using as a power source for his Justice Dissolution before he heavily damages them for defying him. Before they shut down, the Ministers reveal to the Go-ongers that their target is Deus Haguru Magear in their chamber of command, which is keeping the other Go-ongers trapped in wave form. When the Go-ongers arrive at the chamber, Yogoshimacritein uses the Deus Haguru Magear as a new power source as the final battle begins.
| 50 (Final) | "Road of Justice"; Transliteration: "Seigi no Rōdo" (Japanese: 正義ノロード) | Junki Takegami | February 8, 2009 |
The Go-ongers manage to enter Hellgailles Palace and battle Yogoshimacritein as he absorbs power from the Deus Haguru Magear. But once they trap him in the Bikkurium Chamber, Go-on Red uses the primary Engine-powered Kankan MantanGun to destroy the gear. But the destruction of the Deus Haguru Magear causes Hellgailles Palace to self-destruct with the three Go-ongers running for their lives in EngineOh. However, Yogoshimacritein managed to reconstruct himself after Hellgaille Palace's destruction as he decides to destroy the city in retaliation. But the Go-on Wings, Go-on Black, and Go-on Green return and hold him off until the primary Go-ongers arrive. Though the Crime Minister boasts of invincibility, the Go-ongers refuse to give up and hit him with their Go-on Bonds Special. But when Yogoshimacritein enlarges, the other Engines arrive as they all form EngineOh G12. The Go-ongers engage the foe in a very long and intensely brutal battle, during which, they realise that the fate of the world rests on their shoulders. Dodging Yogoshimacritein's finisher, the Closing Despotic Proclamation: Yogoshimanifesto Break, the heroes summon all the power they have left and use the G12 Final Grand Prix to finally scrap Yogoshimacritein once and for all. With the Gaiark threat finally eliminated and the Human World safe, the Engines must leave their partners and return to their world. After saying their goodbyes to the Engines and Bomper, the Go-ongers see their friends off. Several months after their parting, after Gunpei scolds Hant for messing with his handcuffs, they pick up Saki from her bakery before arriving to see the Sutō siblings at their high society party, taking them to the Twin Ring Motegi where the Go-ongers began their adventure. Renn meets them there as they all see Sōsuke before the seven reminisce about the good times they had over as Go-ongers until they get a surprise visit by Speedor and Bomper, who reveals the missing President of the Gaiark named Batchseed is attacking Gunman World and they need their help in dealing with him. The Go-ongers accept the offer without second thought and head off on a new adventure.
