= Hisayoshi Sato =

Japanese swimmer (born 1987)

Personal information
- Full name: Hisayoshi Sato
- Nationality: Japan
- Born: January 12, 1987 (age 39) Tomakomai, Hokkaidō
- Height: 179 cm (5 ft 10 in)
- Weight: 72 kg (159 lb)

Sport
- Sport: Swimming
- Strokes: freestyle
- College team: Nihon University
Medal record
Men's swimming
Representing Japan
Olympic Games
Bronze medal – third place	2008 Beijing	4x100 m medley

Hisayoshi Sato (佐藤 久佳, Satō Hisayoshi; born January 12, 1987, in Tomakomai, Hokkaidō) is a Japanese swimmer. He won a bronze medal in the men's 4 × 100 metre medley relay at the 2008 Summer Olympics.

== Personal bests ==
In long course:

- 50m freestyle: 22.63 (September 5, 2008)
- 100m freestyle: 48.91 (September 9, 2007)
- 200m freestyle: 1:48.77 (September 9, 2007)
