= Swimming at the 2008 Summer Olympics – Men's 4 × 100 metre medley relay =

Men's 4 × 100 metre medley relay at the Games of the XXIX Olympiad
- Venue: Beijing National Aquatics Center
- Date: August 15, 2008 (heats); August 17, 2008 (final)
- Competitors: 75 from 16 nations
- Teams: 16
- Winning time: 3:29.34 WR

Medalists
1st place, gold medalist(s)		Aaron Peirsol, Brendan Hansen, Michael Phelps, Jason Lezak, Matt Grevers*, Mark Gangloff*, Ian Crocker*, Garrett Weber-Gale*	United States
2nd place, silver medalist(s)		Hayden Stoeckel, Brenton Rickard, Andrew Lauterstein, Eamon Sullivan, Ashley Delaney*, Christian Sprenger*, Adam Pine*, Matt Targett*	Australia
3rd place, bronze medalist(s)		Junichi Miyashita, Kosuke Kitajima, Takuro Fujii, Hisayoshi Sato; *Indicates the swimmer only competed in the preliminary heats.	Japan

The men's 4 × 100 metre medley relay event at the 2008 Olympic Games took place on 15 and 17 August at the Beijing National Aquatics Center in Beijing, China.

Since the event's inception in 1960, the U.S. men's team dominated the race from the start to demolish a new world record, to defend their title, and to wrap up the greatest performance in Olympic history for Michael Phelps. Joining Aaron Peirsol (53.16), Brendan Hansen (59.27), and Jason Lezak (46.76), Phelps delivered a butterfly split of 50.15 to maintain a leading pace and claim a historic gold for the Americans with a world-record time of 3:29.34, shaving 1.34 seconds off their standard from Athens in 2004. By capturing his eighth gold, Phelps also eclipsed Mark Spitz's 1972 record of seven for the most in a single Games, raising his career total to 16 medals (14 golds and 2 bronze).

The Aussie foursome of Hayden Stoeckel (53.80), Brenton Rickard (58.56), Andrew Lauterstein (51.03), and Eamon Sullivan (46.65) trailed behind their greatest rivals in the pool by exactly seven-tenths of a second (0.70), but took home silver in an Oceanian record of 3:30.04. Meanwhile, Japan's Kosuke Kitajima fueled the field on the breaststroke leg with a split of 58.07 to deliver the foursome of Junichi Miyashita (53.87), Takuro Fujii (50.89), and Hisayoshi Sato (48.35) a bronze-medal time in 3:31.18, worthy enough for an Asian record.

Russia's Arkady Vyatchanin (53.36), Roman Sloudnov (59.45), Yevgeny Korotyshkin (51.62), and Yevgeny Lagunov (47.49) missed the podium by almost three-fourths of a second (0.75) with a fourth-place effort in 3:31.92, while Daniel Bell (54.52), Glenn Snyders (59.46), Corney Swanepoel (52.12), and Cameron Gibson (47.99) established a New Zealand record of 3:33.39 to claim the fifth spot in the final, holding off the British quartet of Liam Tancock (54.69), Chris Cook (59.65), Michael Rock (52.02), and Simon Burnett (47.33) by 0.30 seconds, a national record of 3:33.69. South Africa's Gerhard Zandberg (54.69), Cameron van der Burgh (59.40), Lyndon Ferns (51.39), and Darian Townsend (48.22) finished closer to the Brits by a hundredth of a second (0.01) with a seventh-place time of 3:33.70. As the entire field came to a finish in the pool, Italy was disqualified from the race because of an early relay takeoff on the final exchange by freestyle anchor Filippo Magnini.

== Records ==
Prior to this competition, the existing world and Olympic records were as follows.

World record	United States (USA); Aaron Peirsol (53.45); Brendan Hansen (59.37); Ian Crocker (50.28); Jason Lezak (47.58)	3:30.68	Athens, Greece	21 August 2004
Olympic record	United States; Aaron Peirsol (53.45); Brendan Hansen (59.37); Ian Crocker (50.28); Jason Lezak (47.58)	3:30.68	Athens, Greece	21 August 2004

The following new world and Olympic records were set during this competition.

Date	Event	Name	Nationality	Time	Record
August 17	Final	Aaron Peirsol (53.16); Brendan Hansen (59.27); Michael Phelps (50.15); Jason Lezak (46.76)	United States	3:29.34	WR

== Results ==
=== Heats ===
Rank	Heat	Lane	Nationality	Name	Time	Notes
1	2	4	United States	Matt Grevers (53.59); Mark Gangloff (1:00.35); Ian Crocker (50.85); Garrett Weber-Gale (47.96)	3:32.75	Q
2	1	4	Australia	Ashley Delaney (53.74); Christian Sprenger (59.95); Adam Pine (51.66); Matt Targett (47.41)	3:32.76	Q, OC
3	1	5	Japan	Junichi Miyashita (54.29); Kosuke Kitajima (58.79); Takuro Fujii (50.86); Hisayoshi Sato (48.87)	3:32.81	Q, AS
4	2	3	Russia	Arkady Vyatchanin (53.86); Roman Sloudnov (59.63); Nikolay Skvortsov (51.62); Andrey Grechin (48.48)	3:33.59	Q, EU
5	1	6	Great Britain	Liam Tancock (54.67); Chris Cook (59.40); Michael Rock (51.99); Simon Burnett (47.77)	3:33.83	Q
6	2	8	New Zealand	Daniel Bell (54.52); Glenn Snyders (59.46); Corney Swanepoel (52.12); Cameron Gibson (47.99)	3:34.09	Q
7	2	6	South Africa	Gerhard Zandberg (54.19); Cameron van der Burgh (59.68); Lyndon Ferns (52.33); Darian Townsend (47.96)	3:34.16	Q, AF
8	2	7	Italy	Mirco di Tora (54.05); Alessandro Terrin (1:01.25); Mattia Nalesso (51.96); Filippo Magnini (47.06)	3:34.32	Q
9	2	1	France	Benjamin Stasiulis (55.46); Hugues Duboscq (59.29); Christophe Lebon (51.97); Fabien Gilot (48.06)	3:34.78	
10	2	5	Canada	Jake Tapp (55.16); Mike Brown (1:00.98); Joe Bartoch (52.58); Brent Hayden (46.84)	3:35.56	
11	1	2	Sweden	Simon Sjödin (55.27); Jonas Andersson (1:01.22); Lars Frölander (51.13); Jonas Persson (48.21)	3:35.83	NR
12	2	2	Croatia	Gordan Kožulj (54.91); Vanja Rogulj (1:01.30); Mario Todorović (51.52); Duje Draganja (49.96)	3:37.69	
13	1	1	Romania	Răzvan Florea (54.81); Valentin Preda (1:01.41); Ioan Gherghel (52.44); Norbert Trandafir (49.34)	3:38.00	
14	1	3	Brazil	Guilherme Guido (54.78); Felipe França Silva (1:02.06); Kaio de Almeida (53.31); Nicolas Oliveira (48.51)	3:38.66	
15	1	7	Ukraine	Oleksandr Isakov (56.66); Valeriy Dymo (1:00.61); Sergiy Breus (52.38); Yuriy Yegoshin (49.11)	3:38.76	
16	1	8	Belarus	Pavel Sankovich (55.11); Viktar Vabishchevich (1:01.89); Yevgeniy Lazuka (52.63); Stanislau Neviarouski (49.76)	3:39.39	

=== Final ===
Rank	Lane	Nationality	Name	Time	Time behind	Notes
1st place, gold medalist(s)	4	United States	Aaron Peirsol (53.16); Brendan Hansen (59.27); Michael Phelps (50.15); Jason Lezak (46.76)	3:29.34		WR
2nd place, silver medalist(s)	5	Australia	Hayden Stoeckel (53.80); Brenton Rickard (58.56); Andrew Lauterstein (51.03); Eamon Sullivan (46.65)	3:30.04	0.70	OC
3rd place, bronze medalist(s)	3	Japan	Junichi Miyashita (53.87); Kosuke Kitajima (58.07); Takuro Fujii (50.89); Hisayoshi Sato (48.35)	3:31.18	1.84	AS
4	6	Russia	Arkady Vyatchanin (53.36); Roman Sloudnov (59.45); Yevgeny Korotyshkin (51.62); Yevgeny Lagunov (47.49)	3:31.92	2.58	EU
5	7	New Zealand	Daniel Bell (54.74); Glenn Snyders (59.87); Corney Swanepoel (51.78); Cameron Gibson (47.00)	3:33.39	4.05	NR
6	2	Great Britain	Liam Tancock (54.69); Chris Cook (59.65); Michael Rock (52.02); Simon Burnett (47.33)	3:33.69	4.35	NR
7	1	South Africa	Gerhard Zandberg (54.69); Cameron van der Burgh (59.40); Lyndon Ferns (51.39); Darian Townsend (48.22)	3:33.70	4.36	AF
	8	Italy	Mirco di Tora (54.52); Loris Facci (1:00.55); Mattia Nalesso (52.26); Filippo Magnini	DSQ		
