= Junichi Miyashita =

Japanese swimmer (born 1983)

Miyashita Junichi
Personal information
- Full name: Miyashita Junichi
- Nationality: Japan
- Born: October 17, 1983 (age 42) Kagoshima, Kagoshima Prefecture, Japan
- Height: 182 cm (6 ft 0 in)
- Weight: 72 kg (159 lb)

Sport
- Sport: Swimming
- Strokes: backstroke
Medal record
Men's swimming
Representing Japan
Olympic Games
Bronze medal – third place	2008 Beijing	4×100 m medley
Asian Games
Gold medal – first place	2006 Doha	100 m backstroke

Junichi Miyashita (宮下 純一, Miyashita Jun'ichi; born October 17, 1983 in Kagoshima) is a Japanese swimmer. He won a bronze medal in the men's 4 × 100 metre medley relay at the 2008 Summer Olympics.
