= Swimming at the 2010 Asian Games =

- Venue: Aoti Aquatics Centre
- Dates: 13–18 November 2010
- Competitors: 294 from 36 nations

Swimming at the 2010 Asian Games was held at the Aoti Aquatics Centre in Guangzhou, China from 13–18 November 2010. This Aquatics discipline had 38 long course events: 19 for males and 19 for females.

== Schedule ==
H	Heats	F	Final

Event↓/Date →	13th Sat		14th Sun		15th Mon		16th Tue		17th Wed		18th Thu	
Men's 50 m freestyle					H	F						
Men's 100 m freestyle									H	F		
Men's 200 m freestyle			H	F								
Men's 400 m freestyle							H	F				
Men's 1500 m freestyle											F	
Men's 50 m backstroke											H	F
Men's 100 m backstroke							H	F				
Men's 200 m backstroke					H	F						
Men's 50 m breaststroke			H	F								
Men's 100 m breaststroke					H	F						
Men's 200 m breaststroke											H	F
Men's 50 m butterfly							H	F				
Men's 100 m butterfly			H	F								
Men's 200 m butterfly	H	F										
Men's 200 m individual medley									H	F		
Men's 400 m individual medley	H	F										
Men's 4 × 100 m freestyle relay							H	F				
Men's 4 × 200 m freestyle relay					H	F						
Men's 4 × 100 m medley relay											H	F
Women's 50 m freestyle							H	F				
Women's 100 m freestyle									H	F		
Women's 200 m freestyle	H	F										
Women's 400 m freestyle					H	F						
Women's 800 m freestyle									F			
Women's 50 m backstroke					H	F						
Women's 100 m backstroke									H	F		
Women's 200 m backstroke			H	F								
Women's 50 m breaststroke	H	F										
Women's 100 m breaststroke							H	F				
Women's 200 m breaststroke									H	F		
Women's 50 m butterfly											H	F
Women's 100 m butterfly	H	F										
Women's 200 m butterfly					H	F						
Women's 200 m individual medley											H	F
Women's 400 m individual medley			H	F								
Women's 4 × 100 m freestyle relay			F									
Women's 4 × 200 m freestyle relay							F					
Women's 4 × 100 m medley relay	F											

== Medalists ==
=== Men ===
Event	Gold		Silver		Bronze	
50 m freestyle	Lü Zhiwu; China	22.37; GR	Masayuki Kishida; Japan	22.45	Rammaru Harada; Japan	22.84
100 m freestyle	Park Tae-hwan; South Korea	48.70; GR	Lü Zhiwu; China	48.98	Takuro Fujii; Japan	49.37
200 m freestyle	Park Tae-hwan; South Korea	1:44.80; AR	Sun Yang; China	1:46.25	Takeshi Matsuda; Japan	1:47.73
400 m freestyle	Park Tae-hwan; South Korea	3:41.53; GR, NR	Sun Yang; China	3:42.47	Zhang Lin; China	3:49.15
1500 m freestyle	Sun Yang; China	14:35.43; AR	Park Tae-hwan; South Korea	15:01.72	Zhang Lin; China	15:22.03
50 m backstroke	Junya Koga; Japan	25.08; GR	Ryosuke Irie; Japan	25.16	Cheng Feiyi; China	25.30
100 m backstroke	Ryosuke Irie; Japan	53.61; GR	Junya Koga; Japan	53.88	Sun Xiaolei; China	54.46
200 m backstroke	Ryosuke Irie; Japan	1:55.45; GR	Zhang Fenglin; China	1:57.53	Cheng Feiyi; China	1:58.93
50 m breaststroke	Xie Zhi; China	27.80; GR	Ryo Tateishi; Japan	27.86	Li Xiayan; China	27.89
100 m breaststroke	Ryo Tateishi; Japan	1:00.38; GR	Vladislav Polyakov; Kazakhstan	1:01.03	Wang Shuai; China	1:01.71
200 m breaststroke	Naoya Tomita; Japan	2:10.36	Xue Ruipeng; China	2:12.25	Shared silver	
200 m breaststroke	Naoya Tomita; Japan	2:10.36	Choi Kyu-woong; South Korea	2:12.25	Shared silver	
50 m butterfly	Zhou Jiawei; China	23.66; GR	Masayuki Kishida; Japan	24.13	Virdhawal Khade; India	24.31
100 m butterfly	Zhou Jiawei; China	51.83; GR	Takuro Fujii; Japan	51.85	Wu Peng; China	52.72
200 m butterfly	Takeshi Matsuda; Japan	1:54.02; GR	Ryusuke Sakata; Japan	1:55.23	Chen Yin; China	1:55.29
200 m individual medley	Ken Takakuwa; Japan	1:58.31; GR	Wang Shun; China	1:59.72	Yuya Horihata; Japan	2:00.48
400 m individual medley	Yuya Horihata; Japan	4:13.35; GR	Huang Chaosheng; China	4:13.38	Ken Takakuwa; Japan	4:16.42
4 × 100 m freestyle relay	China; Shi Tengfei; Jiang Haiqi; Shi Runqiang; Lü Zhiwu; Chen Zuo; Liu Junwu	3:16.34; GR	Japan; Takuro Fujii; Rammaru Harada; Shunsuke Kuzuhara; Sho Uchida; Yuki Kobori; Yoshihiro Okumura	3:16.78	South Korea; Kim Yong-sik; Bae Joon-mo; Park Seon-kwan; Park Tae-hwan; Jung Won-yong; Kim Min-gyu; Lee Hyun-seung; Park Min-kyu	3:19.02
4 × 200 m freestyle relay	China; Zhang Lin; Jiang Haiqi; Li Yunqi; Sun Yang; Dai Jun; Jiang Yuhui; Zhang Enjian	7:07.68; GR	Japan; Yuki Kobori; Sho Uchida; Shunsuke Kuzuhara; Takeshi Matsuda; Yoshihiro Okumura	7:10.39	South Korea; Bae Joon-mo; Jang Sang-jin; Lee Hyun-seung; Park Tae-hwan; Kim Yong-sik; Park Min-kyu	7:24.14
4 × 100 m medley relay	Japan; Ryosuke Irie; Ryo Tateishi; Takuro Fujii; Rammaru Harada; Kosuke Kitajima; Masayuki Kishida; Shunsuke Kuzuhara	3:34.10; GR	South Korea; Park Seon-kwan; Choi Kyu-woong; Jeong Doo-hee; Park Tae-hwan; Kim Ji-heun; Chang Gyu-cheol; Park Min-kyu	3:38.30	Kazakhstan; Stanislav Ossinskiy; Vladislav Polyakov; Fedor Shkilyov; Stanislav Kuzmin; Yevgeniy Ryzhkov; Rustam Khudiyev; Artur Dilman	3:40.55

=== Women ===
Event	Gold		Silver		Bronze	
50 m freestyle	Li Zhesi; China	24.97; GR	Tang Yi; China	25.22	Yayoi Matsumoto; Japan	25.67
100 m freestyle	Tang Yi; China	54.12; GR	Li Zhesi; China	54.84	Haruka Ueda; Japan	55.15
200 m freestyle	Zhu Qianwei; China	1:56.65; GR	Tang Yi; China	1:57.08	Hanae Ito; Japan	1:58.24
400 m freestyle	Shao Yiwen; China	4:05.58; GR	Liu Jing; China	4:08.89	Seo Youn-jeong; South Korea	4:14.50
800 m freestyle	Li Xuanxu; China	8:23.55; GR	Shao Yiwen; China	8:24.14	Maiko Fujino; Japan	8:33.55
50 m backstroke	Gao Chang; China	27.45; GR	Aya Terakawa; Japan	27.86	Xu Tianlongzi; China	28.14
100 m backstroke	Zhao Jing; China	59.20	Shiho Sakai; Japan	59.87	Gao Chang; China	59.90
200 m backstroke	Zhao Jing; China	2:06.46; AR	Shiho Sakai; Japan	2:07.81	Aya Terakawa; Japan	2:09.72
50 m breaststroke	Wang Randi; China	31.04; GR	Zhao Jin; China	31.13	Satomi Suzuki; Japan	31.52
100 m breaststroke	Ji Liping; China	1:06.91	Satomi Suzuki; Japan	1:07.43	Chen Huijia; China	1:07.98
200 m breaststroke	Jeong Da-rae; South Korea	2:25.02	Sun Ye; China	2:25.27	Ji Liping; China	2:25.40
50 m butterfly	Tao Li; Singapore	26.10; GR	Yuka Kato; Japan	26.27	Lu Ying; China	26.29
100 m butterfly	Jiao Liuyang; China	57.76; GR	Tao Li; Singapore	58.24	Yuka Kato; Japan	58.46
200 m butterfly	Jiao Liuyang; China	2:05.79; GR	Natsumi Hoshi; Japan	2:07.96	Choi Hye-ra; South Korea	2:08.39
200 m individual medley	Ye Shiwen; China	2:09.37; GR	Wang Qun; China	2:12.02	Choi Hye-ra; South Korea	2:12.85
400 m individual medley	Ye Shiwen; China	4:33.79; GR	Li Xuanxu; China	4:38.05	Cheng Wan-jung; Chinese Taipei	4:41.55
4 × 100 m freestyle relay	China; Li Zhesi; Wang Shijia; Zhu Qianwei; Tang Yi	3:36.88; GR	Japan; Haruka Ueda; Yayoi Matsumoto; Tomoko Hagiwara; Hanae Ito	3:37.90	Hong Kong; Sze Hang Yu; Yu Wai Ting; Stephanie Au; Hannah Wilson	3:43.17
4 × 200 m freestyle relay	China; Zhu Qianwei; Liu Jing; Wang Shijia; Tang Yi	7:51.81; GR	Japan; Hanae Ito; Haruka Ueda; Yayoi Matsumoto; Risa Sekine	7:55.92	South Korea; Park Na-ri; Choi Hye-ra; Lee Jae-young; Seo Youn-jeong	8:07.78
4 × 100 m medley relay	China; Zhao Jing; Chen Huijia; Jiao Liuyang; Tang Yi	3:57.80; GR	Japan; Aya Terakawa; Satomi Suzuki; Yuka Kato; Haruka Ueda	3:58.24	Hong Kong; Claudia Lau; Fiona Ma; Sze Hang Yu; Hannah Wilson	4:06.83

== Medal table ==
Rank	Nation	Gold	Silver	Bronze	Total
1	China (CHN)	24	16	14	54
2	Japan (JPN)	9	18	12	39
3	South Korea (KOR)	4	3	6	13
4	Singapore (SIN)	1	1	0	2
5	Kazakhstan (KAZ)	0	1	1	2
6	Hong Kong (HKG)	0	0	2	2
7	Chinese Taipei (TPE)	0	0	1	1
7	India (IND)	0	0	1	1
Totals (8 entries)		38	39	37	114

== Participating nations ==
A total of 294 athletes from 36 nations competed in swimming at the 2010 Asian Games:

- Athletes from Kuwait (5)
- Bahrain (2)
- Bangladesh (2)
- Cambodia (2)
- China (52)
- Chinese Taipei (7)
- Hong Kong (21)
- India (9)
- Indonesia (6)
- Iran (6)
- Iraq (1)
- Japan (29)
- Jordan (1)
- Kazakhstan (12)
- Kyrgyzstan (3)
- Laos (2)
- Macau (9)
- Malaysia (12)
- Maldives (2)
- Mongolia (3)
- Myanmar (2)
- Palestine (3)
- Philippines (7)
- Qatar (7)
- Saudi Arabia (3)
- Singapore (17)
- South Korea (24)
- Sri Lanka (2)
- Syria (2)
- Tajikistan (1)
- Thailand (15)
- Turkmenistan (4)
- United Arab Emirates (3)
- Uzbekistan (11)
- Vietnam (5)
- Yemen (2)
