= 2010 FINA World Swimming Championships (25 m) – Men's 4 × 100 metre medley relay =

Men's 4 × 100 m Medley Relay at the 2010 Short Course Worlds
- Dates: 19 December 2010
- Teams: 21
- Winning time: 3:20.99

Medalists
gold medal	United States
silver medal	Russia
bronze medal	Brazil

The Men's 4 × 100 metre Medley Relay at the 10th FINA World Swimming Championships (25m) was swum on 19 December 2010 in Dubai, United Arab Emirates. 21 nations swam in the Preliminary heats in the morning, from which the top-8 finishers advanced to the Final that evening.

At the start of the event, the existing World (WR) and Championship records (CR) were as follows.

Record	Time	Nation	Swimmers	Location	Date
WR	3:19.16	Russia	Stanislav Donets (49.63); Sergey Geybel (56.43); Yevgeny Korotyshkin (48.35); Danila Izotov (44.75)	Saint Petersburg, Russia	20 December 2009
CR	3:24.29	Russia	Stanislav Donets (50.57); Sergey Geybel (57.93); Evgeny Korotyshkin (49.39); Alexander Sukhorukov (46.40)	Manchester	13 April 2008

The following records were established during the competition:

Event	Round	Nation	Swimmer(s)	Time	WR	CR
4x100 Medley Relay	Final	United States	Nick Thoman (49.88); Mihail Alexandrov (56.52); Ryan Lochte (49.17); Garrett Weber-Gale (45.42)	3:20.99		CR
100 Backstroke	Final	Russia	Stanislav Donets	48.95		CR

== Results ==
=== Heats ===
Rank	Heat	Lane	Nation	Name	Time	Notes
1	3	4	Russia	Stanislav Donets (49.56); Stanislav Lakhtyukhov (58.41); Nikita Konovalov (50.39); Sergey Fesikov (46.35)	3:24.71	Q
2	2	4	United States	David Plummer (50.95); Mark Gangloff (58.14); Tyler McGill (50.45); Josh Schneider (47.15)	3:26.69	Q
3	1	6	Germany	Stefan Herbst (46.35); Hendrik Feldwehr (58.50); Benjamin Starke (50.25); Steffen Deibler (46.14)	3:26.91	Q
4	1	7	France	Jérémy Stravius (51.02); Hugues Duboscq (58.21); Clément Lefert (51.81); Yannick Agnel (46.12)	3:27.16	Q
5	1	5	Japan	Masafumi Yamaguchi (52.07); Naoya Tomita (58.15); Masayuki Kishida (50.30); Takuro Fujii (46.80)	3:27.32	Q
6	1	4	Australia	Benjamin Treffers (51.59); Brenton Rickard (58.23); Chris Wright (51.38); Tommaso D'Orsogna (46.57)	3:27.77	Q
7	3	5	Brazil	Guilherme Guido (51.63); Henrique Barbosa (58.28); Glauber Silva (51.61); Nicolas Oliveira (47.08)	3:28.60	Q
8	3	7	China	Cheng Feiyi (51.85); Wang Shuai (58.22); Chen Weiwu (51.31); Lü Zhiwu (47.71)	3:29.09	Q
9	1	3	Canada	Jake Tapp (51.31); Paul Kornfeld (58.57); Joe Bartoch (51.70); Richard Hortness (48.34)	3:29.92	
10	3	1	Italy	Mirco di Tora (51.64); Edoardo Giorgetti (59.39); Paolo Facchinelli (52.07); Marco Orsi (47.24)	3:30.34	
11	2	5	Sweden	Kristian Kron (54.19); Jakob Dorch (59.10); Lars Frölander (50.46); Mattias Carlsson (48.87)	3:32.62	
12	2	3	Kazakhstan	Oleg Rabota (56.33); Vladislav Polyakov (57.64); Rustam Khudiyev (51.36); Artur Dilman (48.76)	3:34.09	
13	2	7	Estonia	Andres Olvik (53.59); Filipp Provorkov (59.33); Martti Aljand (53.13); Vladimir Sidorkin (48.41)	3:34.46	NR
14	3	3	Colombia	Omar Pinzón (53.12); Jorge Murillo (1:01.04); Julio Galofre (53.51); Juan Cambindo (49.68)	3:37.35	NR
15	1	1	Norway	Lavrans Solli (54.28); Sverre Naess (1:01.94); Alexander Broverg Skeltved (54.11); Thomas Ole Fadnes (48.61)	3:38.94	
16	2	6	Chinese Taipei	Lin Yu-An (55.40); Chen Cho-Yi (1:03.70); Hsu Chi-Chieh (52.92); Yuan Ping (50.48)	3:42.50	
17	2	1	Malta	Mark Sammut (59.39); Andrea Agius (1:04.36); Neil Agius (57.22); Andrew Chetcuti (50.10)	3:51.07	
18	2	2	United Arab Emirates	Al Ghaferi Mohammed (58.04); Mubarak Al Besher (1:03.56); Bakheet Al Jasmi (57.98); Obaid Al Jasmi (52.25)	3:51.83	
19	1	2	Macau	Tong Antonio (57.39); Chou Kit (1:07.78); Lao Kuan Fong (56.85); Ngou Pok Man (56.07)	3:58.09	
-	3	2	Kenya		DNS	
-	3	6	Venezuela		DNS	

=== Final ===
Rank	Lane	Nation	Name	Time	Time behind	Notes
1st place, gold medalist(s)	5	United States	Nick Thoman (49.88); Mihail Alexandrov (56.52); Ryan Lochte (49.17); Garrett Weber-Gale (45.42)	3:20.99		CR
2nd place, silver medalist(s)	4	Russia	Stanislav Donets (48.95) CR; Stanislav Lakhtyukhov (57.27); Evgeny Korotyshkin (49.39); Nikita Lobintsev (46.00)	3:21.61	0.62	
3rd place, bronze medalist(s)	1	Brazil	Guilherme Guido (50.69); Felipe França Silva (57.21); Kaio de Almeida (50.09); César Cielo (45.13)	3:23.12	2.13	SA
4	6	France	Camille Lacourt (50.23); Hugues Duboscq (57.51); Frédérick Bousquet (50.92); Fabien Gilot (44.94)	3:23.60	2.61	
5	7	Australia	Benjamin Treffers (51.43); Brenton Rickard (56.59); Geoff Huegill (50.46); Matthew Abood (45.98)	3:24.46	3.47	
6	2	Japan	Ryosuke Irie (50.88); Naoya Tomita (57.49); Masayuki Kishida (50.29); Takuro Fujii (47.01)	3:25.67	4.68	
7	3	Germany	Stefan Herbst (51.92); Hendrik Feldwehr (57.45); Benjamin Starke (50.38); Steffen Deibler (46.30)	3:26.05	4.68	
8	8	China	Cheng Feiyi (51.52); Wang Shuai (57.87); Chen Weiwu (50.86); Lü Zhiwu (47.22)	3:27.47	6.48	

The USA won the event in a Championship Record 3:20.99, ahead of Russia at 3:21.61. Stanislav Donets lead-off the Russia relay with a 48.95, a new Championship Record for the 100 backstroke and within one-hundredth-of-a-second of the World Record. At the 100, Russia was in first place with the USA second. On the second leg (breaststroke), the USA's Alexandrov swam a 56.52, which caught-up the Russia's Lakhtyukhov, so that at the 200, the USA trailed Russia 1:46.40 to 1:46.22. During the third leg (butterfly), the USA's Lochte pulled ahead of Russia's Korotyshkin, giving the USA a slim lead over Russia, 2:35.57 to 2:35.61. For the final leg (freestyle), the USA extended its lead.
