= Swimming at the 2012 Summer Olympics – Men's 100 metre butterfly =

Men's 100 metre butterfly at the Games of the XXX Olympiad
- Venue: London Aquatics Centre
- Dates: August 2, 2012 (heats & semifinals); August 3, 2012 (final)
- Competitors: 43 from 35 nations
- Winning time: 51.21

Medalists
1st place, gold medalist(s)		Michael Phelps	United States
2nd place, silver medalist(s)		Chad le Clos	South Africa
2nd place, silver medalist(s)		Yevgeny Korotyshkin	Russia

The men's 100 metre butterfly event at the 2012 Summer Olympics took place on 2–3 August at the London Aquatics Centre in London, United Kingdom.

Rallying from seventh at the halfway turn, Michael Phelps claimed his seventeenth gold and twenty-first career medal in 51.21, achieving a second Olympic three-peat. Trailing behind Phelps by 0.23 seconds, South Africa's Chad le Clos and Russia's Yevgeny Korotyshkin tied for the silver in a matching time of 51.44.

Leading early at the turn, Serbia's Milorad Čavić, who famously lost to Phelps in Beijing four years earlier by a fingertip, faded down the stretch to match Germany's Steffen Deibler with a fourth-place time in 51.81. Netherlands' Joeri Verlinden (51.82), U.S. swimmer Tyler McGill (51.88), and Poland's Konrad Czerniak (52.05) also vied for an Olympic medal to round out a historic finish.

Austria's Dinko Jukic (51.99), fourth-place finalist in the 200 m butterfly few days earlier; and Kenya's Jason Dunford (52.16), fifth in Beijing, missed the final roster after placing ninth and sixteenth respectively in the semifinals. Other notable swimmers featured Japan's Takeshi Matsuda, who elected not to do a swimoff with Germany's Benjamin Starke (a matching time of 52.36) on the morning prelims; his teammate Takuro Fujii (52.49) and Papua New Guinea's Ryan Pini (52.68), both of whom finished sixth and eighth in Beijing; and Sweden's 2000 champion Lars Frölander, who posted a twentieth-place time of 52.47 in his sixth Olympics.

== Records ==
Prior to this competition, the existing world and Olympic records were:

World record	Michael Phelps (USA)	49.82	Rome, Italy	1 August 2009
Olympic record	Michael Phelps (USA)	50.58	Beijing, China	16 August 2008

== Results ==
=== Heats ===
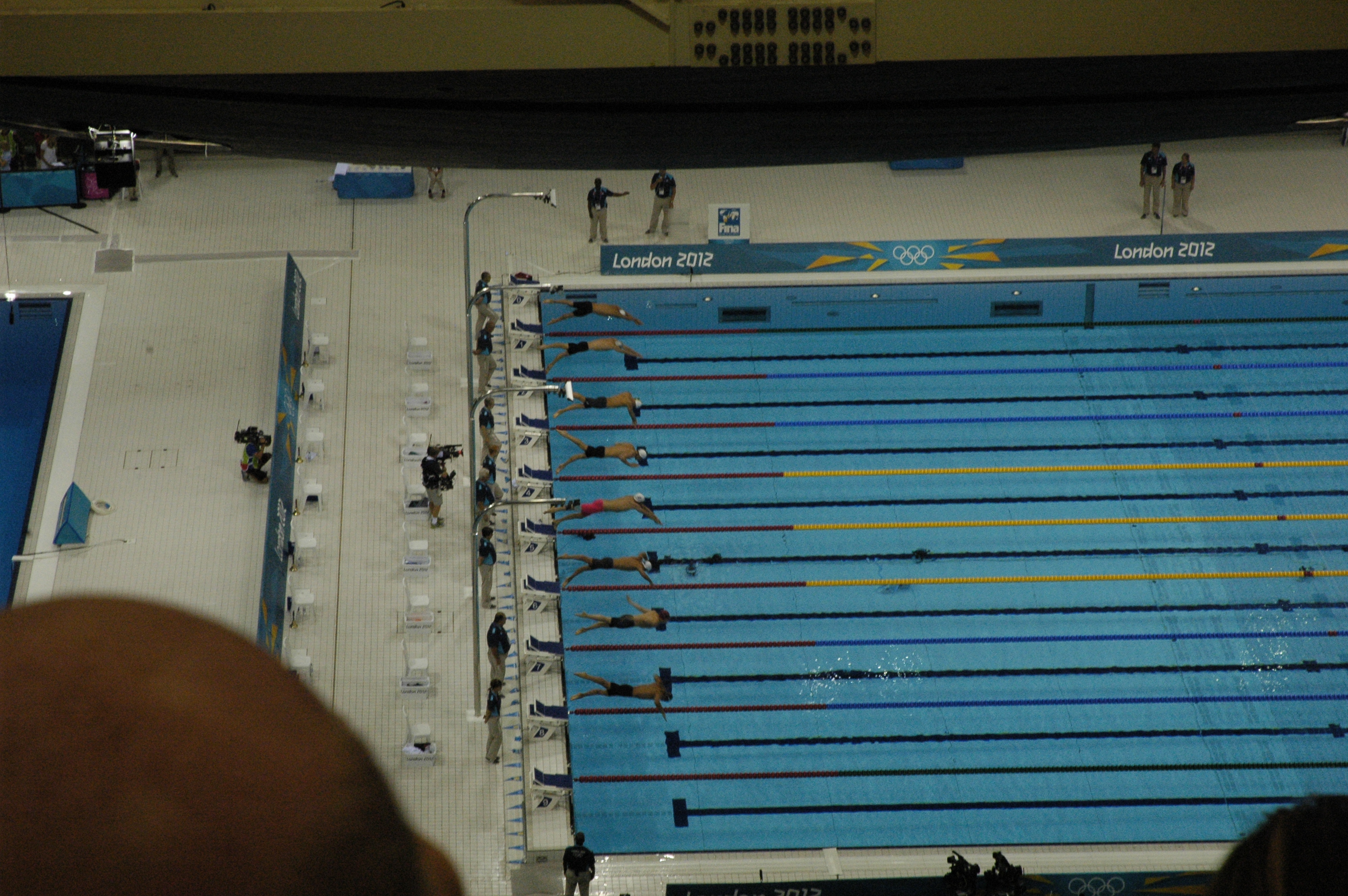
Start of the men's 100m Butterfly heat 6

Rank	Heat	Lane	Name	Nationality	Time	Notes
1	5	7	Chad le Clos	South Africa	51.54	Q, NR
2	6	4	Michael Phelps	United States	51.72	Q
3	4	3	Yevgeny Korotyshkin	Russia	51.84	Q
4	5	4	Konrad Czerniak	Poland	51.85	Q
5	6	5	Milorad Čavić	Serbia	51.90	Q
6	5	6	Steffen Deibler	Germany	51.92	Q
7	4	4	Tyler McGill	United States	51.95	Q
8	4	7	Zhou Jiawei	China	52.03	Q
9	6	6	Joeri Verlinden	Netherlands	52.07	Q
10	6	3	Chris Wright	Australia	52.11	Q
11	6	2	Nikolay Skvortsov	Russia	52.12	Q
12	3	6	Bence Pulai	Hungary	52.19	Q
13	6	1	François Heersbrandt	Belgium	52.22	Q, NR
13	3	7	Dinko Jukic	Austria	52.22	Q
15	5	5	Jason Dunford	Kenya	52.23	Q
16	4	5	Benjamin Starke	Germany	52.36	Q
16	6	8	Takeshi Matsuda	Japan	52.36	
18	5	1	Ivan Lenđer	Serbia	52.40	
19	3	5	Peter Mankoč	Slovenia	52.44	
20	4	1	Lars Frölander	Sweden	52.47	
21	5	3	Takuro Fujii	Japan	52.49	
22	4	8	Matteo Rivolta	Italy	52.50	
23	5	2	Jayden Hadler	Australia	52.52	
24	4	6	Michael Rock	Great Britain	52.56	
25	3	2	Ryan Pini	Papua New Guinea	52.68	
26	3	4	Chang Gyu-cheol	South Korea	52.69	
27	3	1	Joe Bartoch	Canada	53.09	
28	4	2	Kaio de Almeida	Brazil	53.14	
29	5	8	Albert Subirats	Venezuela	53.18	
30	3	3	Clément Lefert	France	53.22	
31	3	8	Simão Morgado	Portugal	53.23	
32	6	7	Antony James	Great Britain	53.25	
33	2	7	Dominik Meichtry	Switzerland	53.40	NR
34	2	4	Pavel Sankovich	Belarus	53.47	
35	2	5	Joseph Schooling	Singapore	53.61	
36	2	3	Benjamin Hockin	Paraguay	53.65	
37	2	1	Daniel Bell	New Zealand	53.76	
38	2	8	Yevgeniy Lazuka	Azerbaijan	53.86	
39	2	6	Vytautas Janušaitis	Lithuania	54.17	
40	2	2	Stefanos Dimitriadis	Greece	54.20	
41	1	3	Sofyan El Gadi	Libya	56.99	NR
42	1	4	Mohanad Ahmed Dheyaa Al-Azzawi	Iraq	1:00.71	
43	1	5	Khalid Alibaba	Bahrain	1:04.05	

=== Semifinals ===
==== Semifinal 1 ====
Rank	Lane	Name	Nationality	Time	Notes
1	4	Michael Phelps	United States	50.86	Q
2	3	Steffen Deibler	Germany	51.76	Q
3	5	Konrad Czerniak	Poland	51.78	Q
4	2	Chris Wright	Australia	52.11	
5	6	Zhou Jiawei	China	52.30	
6	7	Bence Pulai	Hungary	52.40	
6	8	Benjamin Starke	Germany	52.40	
8	1	François Heersbrandt	Belgium	52.71	

==== Semifinal 2 ====
Rank	Lane	Name	Nationality	Time	Notes
1	4	Chad le Clos	South Africa	51.42	Q, NR
2	6	Tyler McGill	United States	51.61	Q
3	3	Milorad Čavić	Serbia	51.66	Q
4	2	Joeri Verlinden	Netherlands	51.75	Q, NR
5	5	Yevgeny Korotyshkin	Russia	51.85	Q
6	1	Dinko Jukić	Austria	51.99	NR
7	7	Nikolay Skvortsov	Russia	52.03	
8	8	Jason Dunford	Kenya	52.16	

=== Final ===
Rank	Lane	Name	Nationality	Time	Notes
1st place, gold medalist(s)	4	Michael Phelps	United States	51.21	
2nd place, silver medalist(s)	5	Chad le Clos	South Africa	51.44	
2nd place, silver medalist(s)	8	Yevgeny Korotyshkin	Russia	51.44	
4	6	Milorad Čavić	Serbia	51.81	
4	7	Steffen Deibler	Germany	51.81	
6	2	Joeri Verlinden	Netherlands	51.82	
7	3	Tyler McGill	United States	51.88	
8	1	Konrad Czerniak	Poland	52.05	
