= 2010 FINA World Swimming Championships (25 m) – Men's 4 × 100 metre freestyle relay =

Men's 4 × 100 m Free Relay at the 2010 Short Course Worlds
- Dates: 15 December 2010
- Teams: 17
- Winning time: 3:04.78

The Men's 4 × 100 Freestyle Relay at the 10th FINA World Swimming Championships (25m) was swum on 15 December 2010 in Dubai, United Arab Emirates. 17 nations swam in the Preliminary heats in the morning, with the top-8 finishers advancing to the final that evening.

At the start of the event, the existing World (WR) and Championship records (CR) were:

Record	Nation	Swimmers	Time	Location	Date
WR	United States	Nathan Adrian (45.08); Matt Grevers (44.68); Garrett Weber-Gale (47.43); Michael Phelps (46.11)	3:03.30	Manchester	19 December 2009
CR	United States	Ryan Lochte (47.09); Bryan Lundquist (46.64); Nathan Adrian (46.57); Doug Van Wie (48.14)	3:08.44	Manchester	10 April 2008

The following records were established during the competition:

Date	Round	Name	Nation	Time	WR	CR
15 December 2010	Heats	Evgeny Lagunov (46.89); Alexander Sukhorukov (46.82); Nikita Konovalov (47.38); Sergey Fesikov (46.69)	Russia	3:07.78		CR
15 December 2010	Final	Alain Bernard (46.78); Frédérick Bousquet (45.92); Fabien Gilot (45.75); Yannick Agnel (46.33)	France	3:04.78		CR

== Results ==
=== Heats ===
Rank	Heat	Lane	Nation	Name	Time	Notes
1	2	5	Russia	Yevgeny Lagunov (46.89); Alexander Sukhorukov (46.82); Nikita Konovalov (47.38); Sergey Fesikov (46.69)	3:07.78	Q, CR
2	2	4	Australia	James Magnussen (47.30); Matthew Abood (46.48); Kyle Richardson (47.05); Tommaso D'Orsogna (47.23)	3:08.06	Q
3	3	4	United States	Garrett Weber-Gale (47.02); Ricky Berens (47.24); David Walters (47.28); Nathan Adrian (47.15)	3:08.69	Q
4	1	4	Brazil	Nicholas Santos (48.29); César Cielo (45.76); Marcelo Chierighini (47.31); Nicolas Oliveira (47.35)	3:08.71	Q
5	3	7	Italy	Luca Dotto (47.06); Luca Leonardi (47.48); Christian Galenda (47.66); Marco Orsi (47.65)	3:09.97	Q
6	1	2	France	Boris Steimetz (47.94); Alain Bernard (46.67); William Meynard (48.19); Frédérick Bousquet (47.17)	3:12.63	Q
7	3	2	China	Shi Tengfei (48.86); Chen Zuo (48.45); Shi Runqiang (47.74); Lü Zhiwu (47.58)	3:12.63	Q
8	3	5	Sweden	Stefan Nystrand (47.53); Robin Andréasson (48.40); Simon Sjödin (48.32); David Ernstsson (48.52)	3:12.77	Q
9	1	5	Canada	Richard Hortness (48.38); Hassaan Abdel Khalik (48.38); Jake Tapp (48.09); Joe Bartoch (49.20)	3:14.05	
10	2	2	Czech Republic	Michal Rubáček (48.44); Martin Verner (48.12); Tomáš Fucík (49.97); Jan Šefl (48.75)	3:15.28	
11	2	3	Chinese Taipei	Yuan Ping (51.00); Hsu Chi-Chieh (50.87); Lin Yuan (51.30); Lin Shih-Chieh (51.95)	3:25.12	
12	1	3	Kuwait	Yousef Alaskari (52.06); Mohammed Madouh (50.86); Abdullah Altuwaini (51.00); Sauod Altayar (54.44)	3:28.36	
13	2	7	Malta	Andrea Agius (52.66); Andrew Chetcuti (51.49); Mark Sammut (53.70); Neil Agius (53.66)	3:31.51	
14	2	6	United Arab Emirates	Obaid Al Jasmi (52.37); Saeed Al Jasmi (53.69); Bakheet Al Jasmi (54.42); Faisal Al Jasmi (55.24)	3:35.72	
15	1	6	Macau	Lao Kuan Fong (51.49); Chou Kit (55.54); Tong Antonio (54.72); Ngou Pok Man (54.87)	3:36.62	
–	3	3	Venezuela		DNS	
–	3	6	Kenya		DNS	

=== Final ===
Rank	Lane	Nation	Name	Time	Notes
1st place, gold medalist(s)	7	France	Alain Bernard (46.78); Frédérick Bousquet (45.92); Fabien Gilot (45.75); Yannick Agnel (46.33)	3:04.78	CR
2nd place, silver medalist(s)	4	Russia	Yevgeny Lagunov (46.68); Sergey Fesikov (45.87); Nikita Lobintsev (45.79); Danila Izotov (46.48)	3:04.82	
3rd place, bronze medalist(s)	6	Brazil	Nicholas Santos (47.33); César Cielo (45.08); Marcelo Chierighini (47.02); Nicolas Oliveira (46.31)	3:05.74	SA
4	3	United States	Nathan Adrian (47.35); Garrett Weber-Gale (45.88); Ricky Berens (46.79); Ryan Lochte (46.08)	3:06.10	
5	5	Australia	James Magnussen (47.18); Matthew Abood (46.76); Kyle Richardson (46.09); Tommaso D'Orsogna (46.15)	3:06.18	
6	2	Italy	Luca Dotto (47.09); Marco Orsi (46.22); Luca Leonardi (47.08); Filippo Magnini (46.17)	3:06.56	
7	1	China	Shi Tengfei (49.07); Jiang Haiqi (46.85); Shi Runqiang (47.97); Lü Zhiwu (47.14)	3:11.03	
8	8	Sweden	Stefan Nystrand (46.70); Robin Andréasson (48.10); Simon Sjödin (48.11); Lars Frölander (48.38)	3:11.29	
