= Swimming at the 2011 World Aquatics Championships – Men's 4 × 100 metre medley relay =

Men's 4 × 100 metre medley relay at the 2011 World Aquatics Championships
- Dates: July 31, 2011 (heats and final)
- Winning time: 3:32.06

Medalists
gold medal	Nick Thoman; Mark Gangloff; Michael Phelps; Nathan Adrian	United States
silver medal	Hayden Stoeckel; Brenton Rickard; Geoff Huegill; James Magnussen	Australia
bronze medal	Helge Meeuw; Hendrik Feldwehr; Benjamin Starke; Paul Biedermann	Germany

The men's 4 × 100 metre medley relay competition of the swimming events at the 2011 World Aquatics Championships took place July 31. The heats and final took place July 31.

== Records ==
Prior to the competition, the existing world and championship records were as follows.

	Name	Nation	Time	Location	Date
World record Championship record	Aaron Peirsol (52.19); Eric Shanteau (58.57); Michael Phelps (49.72); David Walters (46.80)	United States	3:27.28	Rome	August 2, 2009

== Results ==
=== Heats ===
17 teams participated in 3 heats.

Rank	Heat	Lane	Nation	Swimmers	Time	Notes
1	2	4	United States	David Plummer (53.97); Eric Shanteau (1:00.13); Tyler McGill (51.00); Garrett Weber-Gale (47.32)	3:32.42	Q
2	1	6	Germany	Helge Meeuw (53.22); Hendrik Feldwehr (59.98); Benjamin Starke (51.79); Markus Deibler (48.70)	3:33.69	Q
3	1	5	Netherlands	Nick Driebergen (54.64); Lennart Stekelenburg (1:00.42); Joeri Verlinden (51.79); Sebastiaan Verschuren (47.74)	3:34.59	Q
4	2	5	Japan	Ryosuke Irie (53.59); Ryo Tateishi (1:00.52); Takeshi Matsuda (51.79); Takuro Fujii (48.92)	3:34.82	Q
5	1	4	Australia	Ben Treffers (54.09); Christian Sprenger (1:00.21); Sam Ashby (52.06); James Roberts (48.52)	3:34.88	Q
6	2	6	Canada	Charles Francis (54.19); Andrew Dickens (1:01.22); Joseph Bartoch (52.31); Brent Hayden (47.64)	3:35.36	Q
7	3	2	Poland	Radosław Kawęcki (55.20); Dawid Szulich (1:00.82); Paweł Korzeniowski (52.25); Konrad Czerniak (47.86)	3:36.13	Q, NR
8	3	3	Great Britain	Liam Tancock (54.41); Michael Jamieson (1:00.47); Antony James (52.95); Adam Brown (48.36)	3:36.19	Q
9	3	4	France	Jérémy Stravius (53.28); Hugues Duboscq (1:00.14); Florent Manaudou (54.02); Fabien Gilot (48.77)	3:36.21	
10	2	3	South Africa	Charl Crous (55.60); Cameron van der Burgh (1:00.34); Chad le Clos (52.28); Graeme Moore (48.25)	3:36.47	
11	1	3	Italy	Mirco Di Tora (54.64); Fabio Scozzoli (59.63); Marco Belotti (53.79); Luca Dotto (48.68)	3:36.74	
12	3	5	Russia	Stanislav Donets (54.25); Roman Sloudnov (1:00.61); Yevgeny Korotyshkin (52.47); Sergey Fesikov (49.49)	3:36.82	
13	3	7	China	Sun Xiaolei (54.71); Xie Zhi (1:00.59); Zhou Jiawei (52.52); Lü Zhiwu (49.10)	3:36.92	
14	3	6	Brazil	Guilherme Guido (55.12); Felipe França Silva (1:00.11); Kaio de Almeida (53.49); Bruno Fratus (48.27)	3:36.99	
15	1	2	Hungary	Péter Bernek (55.07); Dániel Gyurta (59.95); Bence Biczó (54.08); Dominik Kozma (49.14)	3:38.24	
16	3	1	Sweden	Simon Sjödin (55.70); Jakob Dorch (1:01.94); Lars Frölander (51.65); Petter Stymne (49.05)	3:38.34	
17	1	7	Lithuania	Matas Andriekus (56.19); Giedrius Titenis (1:00.32); Vytautas Janušaitis (53.27); Mindaugas Sadauskas (48.79)	3:38.57	
–	2	2	South Korea			DNS
–	2	7	Greece			DNS

=== Final ===
The final was held at 19:38.

Rank	Lane	Nation	Swimmers	Time	Notes
1st place, gold medalist(s)	4	United States	Nick Thoman (53.61); Mark Gangloff (1:00.24); Michael Phelps (50.57); Nathan Adrian (47.64)	3:32.06	
2nd place, silver medalist(s)	2	Australia	Hayden Stoeckel (54.22); Brenton Rickard (59.32); Geoff Huegill (51.72); James Magnussen (47.00)	3:32.26	
3rd place, bronze medalist(s)	5	Germany	Helge Meeuw (53.53); Hendrik Feldwehr (59.72); Benjamin Starke (51.83); Paul Biedermann (47.52)	3:32.60	
4	6	Japan	Ryosuke Irie (52.94); Kosuke Kitajima (59.59); Takuro Fujii (51.55); Shogo Hihara (48.81)	3:32.89	
5	3	Netherlands	Nick Driebergen (54.32); Lennart Stekelenburg (1:00.62); Joeri Verlinden (51.60); Sebastiaan Verschuren (47.57)	3:34.11	
6	8	Great Britain	Liam Tancock (54.30); Michael Jamieson (1:00.98); Antony James (52.81); Adam Brown (48.49)	3:36.58	
7	7	Canada	Charles Francis (54.36); Andrew Dickens (1:01.94); Joseph Bartoch (52.76); Brent Hayden (47.74)	3:36.80	
8	1	Poland	Marcin Tarczyński (55.69); Dawid Szulich (1:01.04); Paweł Korzeniowski (52.44); Konrad Czerniak (48.27)	3:37.44	
