= Swimming at the 2010 Asian Games – Men's 100 metre butterfly =

Men's 100 metre butterfly at the 2010 Asian Games
- Venue: Aoti Aquatics Centre
- Date: 14 November 2010
- Competitors: 31 from 21 nations

Medalists
gold medal	Zhou Jiawei	China
silver medal	Takuro Fujii	Japan
bronze medal	Wu Peng	China

The men's 100 metre butterfly event at the 2010 Asian Games took place on 14 November 2010 at Guangzhou Aoti Aquatics Centre.

There were 31 competitors from 21 countries who took part in this event. Four heats were held, with most containing the maximum number of swimmers (eight). The heat in which a swimmer competed did not formally matter for advancement, as the swimmers with the top eight times from the entire field qualified for the finals.

Zhou Jiawei from China won the gold medal with 51.83 seconds.

== Schedule ==
All times are China Standard Time (UTC+08:00)

Date	Time	Event
Sunday, 14 November 2010	09:00	Heats
Sunday, 14 November 2010	18:00	Final

== Records ==
Prior to this competition, the existing world, Asian and Games records were as follows.

World Record	Michael Phelps (USA)	49.82	Rome, Italy	1 August 2009
Asian Record	Kohei Kawamoto (JPN)	51.00	Niigata, Japan	11 September 2009
Games Record	Takashi Yamamoto (JPN)	52.54	Doha, Qatar	3 December 2006

== Results ==
Legend

- DNS — Did not start

=== Heats ===
Rank	Heat	Athlete	Time	Notes
1	4	Takuro Fujii (JPN)	52.85	
2	2	Zhou Jiawei (CHN)	53.03	
3	2	Chang Gyu-cheol (KOR)	53.37	
4	3	Masayuki Kishida (JPN)	53.83	
5	4	Wu Peng (CHN)	53.85	
6	3	Jeong Doo-hee (KOR)	53.94	
7	3	Hsu Chi-chieh (TPE)	54.16	
8	3	Fedor Shkilyov (KAZ)	54.50	
9	4	Glenn Victor Sutanto (INA)	54.70	
10	3	David Wong (HKG)	54.76	
11	2	Stanislav Kuzmin (KAZ)	54.88	
12	4	Daniel Bego (MAS)	55.00	
13	3	Salman Qali (IOC)	55.31	
14	2	Rami Anis (SYR)	56.09	
15	2	Derick Ng (HKG)	56.35	
16	4	Nicholas Tan (SIN)	56.38	
17	1	Guntur Pratama Putera (INA)	56.43	
18	4	Hoàng Quý Phước (VIE)	56.53	
19	2	Rehan Poncha (IND)	57.09	
20	3	Pang Sheng Jun (SIN)	57.15	
21	4	Võ Thái Nguyên (VIE)	57.26	
22	1	Danil Bugakov (UZB)	57.53	
23	2	Maksim Danilenko (UZB)	57.67	
24	1	Kareem Ennab (JOR)	57.77	
25	1	Obaid Al-Jasmi (UAE)	57.83	
26	2	Virdhawal Khade (IND)	58.21	
27	3	Iurii Zakharov (KGZ)	58.38	
28	1	Chong Cheok Kuan (MAC)	59.21	
29	1	Rami Fetyani (KSA)	1:01.97	
30	1	Abdulaziz Al-Marzooqi (QAT)	1:05.17	
—	4	Jessie Lacuna (PHI)	DNS	

=== Final ===
Rank	Athlete	Time	Notes
1st place, gold medalist(s)	Zhou Jiawei (CHN)	51.83	GR
2nd place, silver medalist(s)	Takuro Fujii (JPN)	51.85	
3rd place, bronze medalist(s)	Wu Peng (CHN)	52.72	
4	Masayuki Kishida (JPN)	52.93	
5	Chang Gyu-cheol (KOR)	53.40	
6	Jeong Doo-hee (KOR)	53.57	
7	Hsu Chi-chieh (TPE)	53.86	
8	Fedor Shkilyov (KAZ)	55.05	
