= 2012 FINA World Swimming Championships (25 m) – Men's 4 × 100 metre freestyle relay =

Men's 4 × 100 m Freestyle Relay at the 2012 Short Course Worlds
- Dates: 12 December (heats and final)
- Winning time: 3:06.40

Medalists
gold medal	United States; Anthony Ervin, Ryan Lochte, Jimmy Feigen, Matt Grevers, Garrett Weber-Gale*, Tyler Reed*
silver medal	Italy; Luca Dotto, Marco Orsi, Michele Santucci, Filippo Magnini
bronze medal	Australia; Tommaso D'Orsogna, Kyle Richardson, Travis Mahoney, Kenneth To; *Indicates the swimmer only competed in the preliminary heats.

The men's 4 × 100 metre freestyle relay event at the 11th FINA World Swimming Championships (25m) took place 12 December 2012 at the Sinan Erdem Dome.

== Records ==
Prior to this competition, the existing world and championship records were as follows.

	Nation	Swimmers	Time	Location	Date
World record	United States	Nathan Adrian (45.08); Matt Grevers (44.68); Garrett Weber-Gale (47.43); Michael Phelps (46.11)	3:03.30	Manchester	19 December 2009
Championship record	France	Alain Bernard (46.78); Frédérick Bousquet (45.92); Fabien Gilot (45.75); Yannick Agnel (46.33)	3:04.78	Dubai	15 December 2010

The following records were established during the competition:

Date	Event	Round	Nation	Name	Time	Record
12 December	100 freestyle	Final	Russia	Vladimir Morozov	45.52	CR

== Results ==
=== Heats ===
19 teams participated in 3 heats.

Rank	Heat	Lane	Nation	Swimmers	Time	Notes
1	1	1	Italy	Luca Dotto (47.04); Marco Orsi (46.89); Michele Santucci (47.50); Filippo Magnini (47.31)	3:08.74	Q
2	2	4	United States	Anthony Ervin (46.86); Garrett Weber-Gale (46.99); Tyler Reed (48.15); Jimmy Feigen (46.90)	3:08.90	Q
3	2	5	Russia	Vladimir Morozov (46.63); Yevgeny Lagunov (46.95); Artem Lobuzov (47.71); Dmitri Yermakov (47.73)	3:09.02	Q
4	1	4	Australia	Tommaso D'Orsogna (47.25); Kyle Richardson (47.67); Travis Mahoney (47.27); Kenneth To (47.04)	3:09.23	Q
5	2	3	Japan	Kenta Ito (47.91); Shinri Shioura (46.88); Kenji Kobase (47.22); Takuro Fujii (47.71)	3:09.72	Q, AS
6	3	5	Brazil	Guilherme Roth (48.13); Fernando Santos (47.60); Leonardo Alcover (47.47); Vinicius Waked (48.73)	3:11.93	Q
7	2	7	China	Lü Zhiwu (48.16); Shi Yang (48.12); Hao Yun (47.94); Shi Tengfei (48.55)	3:12.77	Q
8	3	3	Turkey	Kemal Arda Gürdal (47.93); Iskender Baslakov (48.71); Kaan Türker Ayar (50.17); Doğa Çelik (47.59)	3:14.40	Q, NR
9	1	7	Croatia	Ivan Levaj (49.12); Dominik Straga (48.71); Mihael Vukić (49.62); Mislav Sever (49.23)	3:16.68	NR
10	2	1	Great Britain	Ieuan Lloyd (49.46); Robert Renwick (49.62); Roberto Pavoni (49.21); Chris Walker-Hebborn (48.48)	3:16.77	
11	1	5	Paraguay	Carlos Orihuela (52.42); José Lobo (51.75); Charles Hockin (49.25); Ben Hockin (47.48)	3:20.90	
12	1	3	Argentina	Joaquín Belza (49.66); Martín Naidich (51.66); Juan Pereyra (51.38); Matías Aguilera (48.25)	3:20.95	NR
13	2	6	Macau	Lao Kuan Fong (51.32); Ngou Pok Man (52.48); Chao Man Hou (54.47); Sio Ka Kun (54.14)	3:32.41	
14	1	6	India	Neil Himanshu Contractor (54.03); Sarma S. P. Nair (53.37); Agnishwar Jayaprakash (52.27); Jaywant Arcot Vijaykumar (55.33)	3:35.00	
15	3	2	Malta	Andrew Chetcuti (49.96); Andrea Agius (53.49); Edward Caruana Dingli (53.19); Andrea M. Agius (58.75)	3:35.39	
16	1	2	Brunei	Omar Yousif (54.24); Farhan Farhan (57.93); Faraj Farhan (1:00.24); Khalid Ali Baba (57.60)	3:50.01	
17	2	2	Qatar	Omar Omar (57.83); Noah Al-Khulaifi (57.79); Walid Daloul (1:00.15); Abdulrahman Al-Kuwari (1:00.13)	3:55.90	
	3	4	Singapore	Joseph Schooling (49.85); Pang Sheng Jun; Quah Zheng Wen; Ng Kai Wee Rainer	DSQ	
	3	7	Canada	Thomas Gossland (48.41); Jake Tapp; Coleman Allen; Luke Peddie	DSQ	
	3	1	Ghana		DNS	
	3	6	Peru		DNS	
	3	8	Venezuela		DNS	

=== Final ===
The final was held at 20:26.

Rank	Lane	Nation	Swimmers	Time	Notes
1st place, gold medalist(s)	5	United States	Anthony Ervin (47.28); Ryan Lochte (45.64); Jimmy Feigen (47.25); Matt Grevers (46.23)	3:06.40	
2nd place, silver medalist(s)	4	Italy	Luca Dotto (46.84); Marco Orsi (45.94); Michele Santucci (47.46); Filippo Magnini (46.83)	3:07.07	
3rd place, bronze medalist(s)	6	Australia	Tommaso D'Orsogna (46.68); Kyle Richardson (46.92); Travis Mahoney (47.32); Kenneth To (46.35)	3:07.27	
4	3	Russia	Vladimir Morozov (45.52) CR; Yevgeny Lagunov (46.58); Viatcheslav Andrusenko (47.65); Artem Lobuzov (48.26)	3:08.01	
5	2	Japan	Takuro Fujii (48.18); Shinri Shioura (46.88); Kenji Kobase (47.37); Kenta Ito (46.72)	3:09.15	AS
6	7	Brazil	Leonardo Alcover (48.01); Fernando Santos (47.83); Guilherme Roth (46.79); Vinicius Waked (48.09)	3:10.72	
7	1	China	Lü Zhiwu (48.20); Shi Yang (48.33); Hao Yun (47.81); Shi Tengfei (48.32)	3:12.66	
8	8	Turkey	Kemal Arda Gürdal (47.86); Iskender Baslakov (48.23); Doğa Çelik (47.96); Kaan Türker Ayar (49.68)	3:13.73	NR
