= Swimming at the 2012 Summer Olympics – Men's 4 × 100 metre medley relay =

Men's 4 × 100 metre medley relay at the Games of the XXX Olympiad
- Venue: London Aquatics Centre
- Dates: August 3, 2012 (heats); August 4, 2012 (final)
- Competitors: 84 from 16 nations
- Teams: 16
- Winning time: 3:29.35

Medalists
1st place, gold medalist(s)		Matt Grevers, Brendan Hansen, Michael Phelps, Nathan Adrian, Nick Thoman*, Eric Shanteau*, Tyler McGill*, Cullen Jones*	United States
2nd place, silver medalist(s)		Ryosuke Irie, Kosuke Kitajima, Takeshi Matsuda, Takuro Fujii	Japan
3rd place, bronze medalist(s)		Hayden Stoeckel, Christian Sprenger, Matt Targett, James Magnussen, Brenton Rickard*, Tommaso D'Orsogna*; *Indicates the swimmer only competed in the preliminary heats.	Australia

The men's 4 × 100 metre medley relay event at the 2012 Summer Olympics took place on 3–4 August at the London Aquatics Centre in London, United Kingdom.

In the final race of his unprecedented career before a temporary retirement, Michael Phelps topped off with his eighteenth gold and twenty-second overall to officially become the most decorated Olympian of all time, as the U.S. men's team posted a textile best to defend the Olympic medley relay title since the event's inception in 1960. Trading the lead with Japan throughout the race, the solid foursome of Matt Grevers (52.58), Brendan Hansen (59.19), Phelps (50.73), and Nathan Adrian (46.85) put together a historic ending with a blazing fast finish in 3:29.35, just a fingertip short of their 2008 Olympic record during the high-tech bodysuit era.

Japan's Ryosuke Irie (52.92), Kosuke Kitajima (58.64), Takeshi Matsuda (51.20), and Takuro Fujii (48.50) were neck-and-neck with the Americans throughout the race before Adrian pulled off a lead in the freestyle leg, leaving them with a silver in 3:31.26. Meanwhile, James Magnussen produced a freestyle anchor of 47.22 to deliver the Aussie foursome of Hayden Stoeckel (53.71), Christian Sprenger (59.05), and Matt Targett (51.60) a bronze-medal time in 3:31.58.

Great Britain's Liam Tancock (53.40), Michael Jamieson (59.27), Michael Rock (51.74), and Adam Brown (47.91) missed the podium by almost three quarters of a second (0.75) with a fourth-place effort in 3:32.32. Meanwhile, Hungary's László Cseh (53.40, a national-record split), Dániel Gyurta (59.01), Bence Pulai (51.82), and Dominik Kozma (48.79) claimed a fifth spot in 3:33.02 to hold off the agile German foursome of Helge Meeuw (53.78), Christian vom Lehn (1:00.30), and Deibler brothers Steffen (50.91) and Markus (48.07) by four-hundredths of a second, a sixth-place time in 3:33.06. Netherlands (3:33.46) and Canada (3:34.19), anchored by freestyle swimmer and bronze medalist Brent Hayden, rounded out a historic championship finale.

== Records ==
Prior to this competition, the existing world and Olympic records were as follows.

World record	United States (USA); Aaron Peirsol (52.19); Eric Shanteau (58.57); Michael Phelps (49.72); David Walters (46.80)	3:27.28	Rome, Italy	2 August 2009
Olympic record	United States; Aaron Peirsol (53.16); Brendan Hansen (59.27); Michael Phelps (50.15); Jason Lezak (46.76)	3:29.34	Beijing, China	17 August 2008

== Results ==
=== Heats ===
Rank	Heat	Lane	Nation	Swimmers	Time	Notes
1	2	4	United States	Nick Thoman (53.31); Eric Shanteau (59.69); Tyler McGill (51.53); Cullen Jones (48.12)	3:32.65	Q
2	1	1	Great Britain	Liam Tancock (53.98); Craig Benson (59.68); Michael Rock (51.56); Adam Brown (48.22)	3:33.44	Q
3	2	3	Japan	Ryosuke Irie (53.08); Kosuke Kitajima (59.47); Takeshi Matsuda (52.09); Takuro Fujii (49.00)	3:33.64	Q
4	1	4	Australia	Hayden Stoeckel (53.89); Brenton Rickard (59.95); Matt Targett (51.30); Tommaso D'Orsogna (48.59)	3:33.73	Q
5	1	3	Netherlands	Nick Driebergen (53.98); Lennart Stekelenburg (1:00.52); Joeri Verlinden (51.46); Sebastiaan Verschuren (47.82)	3:33.78	Q, NR
6	2	5	Germany	Helge Meeuw (53.82); Christian vom Lehn (1:01.13); Steffen Deibler (51.18); Marco di Carli (48.15)	3:34.28	Q
7	2	6	Hungary	László Cseh (53.78) NR; Dániel Gyurta (59.63); Bence Pulai (52.47); Dominik Kozma (48.56)	3:34.44	Q, NR
8	1	2	Canada	Charles Francis (53.91); Scott Dickens (1:00.60); Joe Bartoch (52.43); Brent Hayden (47.52)	3:34.46	Q
9	2	2	New Zealand	Gareth Kean (54.01); Glenn Snyders (59.00); Andrew McMillan (52.77); Carl O'Donnell (48.74)	3:34.52	
10	2	7	France	Camille Lacourt (53.63); Giacomo Perez d'Ortona (1:00.03); Romain Sassot (52.17); Yannick Agnel (48.77)	3:34.60	
11	1	8	China	Cheng Feiyi (53.70); Li Xiayan (1:00.96); Zhou Jiawei (51.44); Lü Zhiwu (48.55)	3:34.65	
12	1	7	Russia	Vladimir Morozov (53.99); Vyacheslav Sinkevich (1:00.80); Nikolay Skvortsov (51.83); Andrey Grechin (48.32)	3:34.94	
13	2	8	South Africa	Charl Crous (55.23); Cameron van der Burgh (58.96); Chad le Clos (51.83); Leith Shankland (49.21)	3:35.23	
14	1	5	Italy	Mirco di Tora (54.67); Fabio Scozzoli (1:00.28); Matteo Rivolta (53.10); Luca Dotto (48.83)	3:36.88	
15	1	6	Brazil	Thiago Pereira (54.45); Felipe França Silva (1:00.77); Kaio de Almeida (53.61); Marcelo Chierighini (48.17)	3:37.00	
16	2	1	Poland	Radosław Kawęcki (54.65); Dawid Szulich (1:01.39); Paweł Korzeniowski (52.40); Kacper Majchrzak (49.72)	3:38.16	

=== Final ===
Rank	Lane	Nation	Swimmers	Time	Time Behind	Notes
1st place, gold medalist(s)	4	United States	Matt Grevers (52.58); Brendan Hansen (59.19); Michael Phelps (50.73); Nathan Adrian (46.85)	3:29.35		
2nd place, silver medalist(s)	3	Japan	Ryosuke Irie (52.92); Kosuke Kitajima (58.64); Takeshi Matsuda (51.20); Takuro Fujii (48.50)	3:31.26	1.91	
3rd place, bronze medalist(s)	6	Australia	Hayden Stoeckel (53.71); Christian Sprenger (59.05); Matt Targett (51.60); James Magnussen (47.22)	3:31.58	2.23	
4	5	Great Britain	Liam Tancock (53.40); Michael Jamieson (59.27); Michael Rock (51.74); Adam Brown (47.91)	3:32.32	2.97	
5	1	Hungary	László Cseh (53.40) NR; Dániel Gyurta (59.01); Bence Pulai (51.82); Dominik Kozma (48.79)	3:33.02	3.67	NR
6	7	Germany	Helge Meeuw (53.78); Christian vom Lehn (1:00.30); Steffen Deibler (50.91); Markus Deibler (48.07)	3:33.06	3.71	
7	2	Netherlands	Nick Driebergen (53.79); Lennart Stekelenburg (1:00.24); Joeri Verlinden (51.86); Sebastiaan Verschuren (47.57)	3:33.46	4.11	NR
8	8	Canada	Charles Francis (54.16); Scott Dickens (1:00.29); Joe Bartoch (52.32); Brent Hayden (47.42)	3:34.19	4.84	
