= 2012 FINA World Swimming Championships (25 m) – Men's 200 metre butterfly =

Men's 200m Butterfly at the 2012 Short Course Worlds
- Dates: 16 December (heats and final)
- Winning time: 1:51.01

Medalists
gold medal	Kazuya Kaneda	Japan
silver medal	László Cseh	Hungary
bronze medal	Nikolay Skvortsov	Russia

The men's 200 metre butterfly event at the 11th FINA World Swimming Championships (25m) took place 16 December 2012 at the Sinan Erdem Dome.

== Records ==
Prior to this competition, the existing world and championship records were as follows.

	Name	Nation	Time	Location	Date
World record	Kaio de Almeida	Brazil	1:49.11	Stockholm	10 November 2009
Championship record	Moss Burmester	New Zealand	1:51.05	Manchester	13 April 2008

The following records were established during the competition:

Date	Event	Name	Nation	Time	Record
16 December	Final	Kazuya Kaneda	Japan	1:51.01	CR

== Results ==
=== Heats ===
Rank	Heat	Lane	Name	Time	Notes
1	5	4	Nikolay Skvortsov (RUS)	1:52.64	Q
2	4	4	Kazuya Kaneda (JPN)	1:53.14	Q
3	3	4	László Cseh (HUN)	1:53.26	Q
4	4	6	Grant Irvine (AUS)	1:53.74	Q
5	5	2	Michal Poprawa (POL)	1:53.80	Q
6	3	5	Yuki Kobori (JPN)	1:53.85	Q
7	4	7	Robert Bollier (USA)	1:53.87	Q
8	5	6	Joeri Verlinden (NED)	1:53.91	Q
9	3	6	Robert Žbogar (SLO)	1:54.11	
10	3	2	Gal Nevo (ISR)	1:54.16	
11	5	7	Zackariah Chetrat (CAN)	1:54.28	
12	1	8	Wu Peng (CHN)	1:54.29	
13	4	1	Mark Dylla (USA)	1:54.40	
14	1	2	Chen Yin (CHN)	1:54.49	
15	3	3	Mauricio Fiol (PER)	1:55.02	
16	4	5	Velimir Stjepanović (SRB)	1:55.41	
17	4	2	Evgeny Koptelov (RUS)	1:55.63	
18	5	1	Roberto Pavoni (GBR)	1:55.67	
19	4	0	Andreas Vazaios (GRE)	1:55.77	
20	5	3	Bence Biczó (HUN)	1:56.28	
21	3	7	Hsu Chi-Chieh (TPE)	1:56.64	
22	2	6	Michael Meyer (RSA)	1:56.68	
23	2	4	Coleman Allen (CAN)	1:57.45	
24	3	0	Matthew Johnson (GBR)	1:57.48	
25	4	8	Jakub Maly (AUT)	1:57.91	
26	5	8	Chang Gyu-Cheol (KOR)	1:58.51	
27	2	5	Emmanuel Crescimbeni (PER)	1:59.34	
28	3	8	Joseph Schooling (SIN)	1:59.44	NR
29	4	9	Ng Kai Wee Rainer (SIN)	1:59.78	
30	3	1	Alexandre Liess (SUI)	2:00.34	
31	2	7	Marko Blaževski (MKD)	2:01.96	
32	2	8	Teimuraz Kobakhidze (GEO)	2:02.27	
33	2	1	Ayman Klzie (SYR)	2:02.41	
34	5	9	Pavel Naroskin (EST)	2:02.62	
35	2	2	Carlos Orihuela (PAR)	2:04.26	
36	2	0	Joaquin Sepulveda (CHI)	2:04.39	
37	2	9	Nuno Rola (ANG)	2:08.43	
38	1	4	Paul Elaisa (FIJ)	2:15.03	
39	1	7	Lao Kuan Fong (MAC)	2:15.23	
40	1	5	Sio Ka Kun (MAC)	2:19.39	
41	1	3	Khalid Baba (BHR)	2:20.01	
42	1	6	Franc Aleksi (ALB)	2:20.31	
	4	3	Victor Bromer (DEN)	DSQ	
	1	1	Marcos Lavado (VEN)	DNS	
	2	3	Nurettin Yildir Erhan (TUR)	DNS	
	3	9	Pedro Pinotes (ANG)	DNS	
	5	0	Taki Mrabet (TUN)	DNS	
	5	5	Chad le Clos (RSA)	DNS	

=== Final ===
The final was held at 20:23.

Rank	Lane	Name	Nationality	Time	Notes
1st place, gold medalist(s)	5	Kazuya Kaneda	Japan	1:51.01	CR
2nd place, silver medalist(s)	3	László Cseh	Hungary	1:51.66	
3rd place, bronze medalist(s)	4	Nikolay Skvortsov	Russia	1:52.33	
4	7	Yuki Kobori	Japan	1:53.14	
5	8	Joeri Verlinden	Netherlands	1:53.49	
6	1	Robert Bollier	United States	1:53.85	
7	6	Grant Irvine	Australia	1:54.11	
8	2	Michal Poprawa	Poland	1:54.20	
