= Swimming at the 2010 Asian Games – Men's 50 metre butterfly =

Men's 50 metre butterfly at the 2010 Asian Games
- Venue: Aoti Aquatics Centre
- Date: 16 November 2010
- Competitors: 33 from 23 nations

Medalists
gold medal	Zhou Jiawei	China
silver medal	Masayuki Kishida	Japan
bronze medal	Virdhawal Khade	India

The men's 50 metre butterfly event at the 2010 Asian Games took place on 16 November 2010 at Guangzhou Aoti Aquatics Centre.

There were 33 competitors from 23 countries who took part in this event. Five heats were held, with most containing the maximum number of swimmers (eight). The heat in which a swimmer competed did not formally matter for advancement, as the swimmers with the top eight times from the entire field qualified for the finals.

Zhou Jiawei from China won the gold medal, Masayuki Kishida from Japan finished with second place, Virdhawal Khade from India won the bronze medal, it's the only swimming medal for India in the 2010 Asian games.

== Schedule ==
All times are China Standard Time (UTC+08:00)

Date	Time	Event
Tuesday, 16 November 2010	09:00	Heats
Tuesday, 16 November 2010	18:00	Final

== Records ==
Prior to this competition, the existing world, Asian and Games records were as follows.

World Record	Rafael Muñoz (ESP)	22.43	Málaga, Spain	5 April 2009
Asian Record	Zhou Jiawei (CHN)	23.43	Shaoxing, China	6 April 2009
Games Record	Zhou Jiawei (CHN)	23.94	Doha, Qatar	5 December 2006

== Results ==
=== Heats ===
Rank	Heat	Athlete	Time	Notes
1	4	Zhou Jiawei (CHN)	24.23	
2	4	Chen Weiwu (CHN)	24.42	
3	5	Jeong Doo-hee (KOR)	24.48	
4	5	Masayuki Kishida (JPN)	24.49	
5	3	Virdhawal Khade (IND)	24.56	
6	3	Rammaru Harada (JPN)	24.51	
7	3	Chang Gyu-cheol (KOR)	24.75	
8	4	Rustam Khudiyev (KAZ)	24.84	
8	3	Glenn Victor Sutanto (INA)	24.84	
10	4	Guntur Pratama Putera (INA)	25.14	
11	5	Daniel Bego (MAS)	25.15	
12	5	Stanislav Kuzmin (KAZ)	25.29	
13	5	Salman Qali (IOC)	25.59	
14	3	Lao Kuan Fong (MAC)	25.61	
15	5	Nicholas Tan (SIN)	25.64	
16	4	Yan Ho Chun (HKG)	25.81	
17	3	Rami Anis (SYR)	25.87	
18	4	Kareem Ennab (JOR)	25.91	
19	5	Derick Ng (HKG)	26.02	
20	5	Mohammed Al-Ghaferi (UAE)	26.04	
21	2	Anshul Kothari (IND)	26.08	
22	4	Iurii Zakharov (KGZ)	26.31	
23	3	Pang Sheng Jun (SIN)	26.46	
24	3	Võ Thái Nguyên (VIE)	26.56	
25	4	Maksim Danilenko (UZB)	26.79	
26	2	Chong Cheok Kuan (MAC)	26.88	
27	2	Kamal Hossain (BAN)	26.90	
28	2	Rami Fetyani (KSA)	27.03	
29	2	Dmitri Aleksandrov (KGZ)	27.06	
30	1	Batsaikhany Dölgöön (MGL)	27.08	
31	2	Aung Zaw Phyo (MYA)	28.42	
32	1	Yousef Al-Nehmi (YEM)	30.71	
33	1	Alisher Changizov (TJK)	31.19	

=== Swim-off ===
Rank	Athlete	Time	Notes
1	Rustam Khudiyev (KAZ)	24.79	
2	Glenn Victor Sutanto (INA)	25.04	

=== Final ===
Rank	Athlete	Time	Notes
1st place, gold medalist(s)	Zhou Jiawei (CHN)	23.66	GR
2nd place, silver medalist(s)	Masayuki Kishida (JPN)	24.13	
3rd place, bronze medalist(s)	Virdhawal Khade (IND)	24.31	
4	Jeong Doo-hee (KOR)	24.37	
5	Chen Weiwu (CHN)	24.43	
6	Rammaru Harada (JPN)	24.51	
7	Chang Gyu-cheol (KOR)	24.60	
8	Rustam Khudiyev (KAZ)	24.72	
