= Swimming at the 2010 Asian Games – Men's 200 metre butterfly =

Men's 200 metre butterfly at the 2010 Asian Games
- Venue: Aoti Aquatics Centre
- Date: 13 November 2010
- Competitors: 17 from 12 nations

Medalists
gold medal	Takeshi Matsuda	Japan
silver medal	Ryusuke Sakata	Japan
bronze medal	Chen Yin	China

The men's 200 metre butterfly event at the 2010 Asian Games took place on 13 November 2010 at Guangzhou Aoti Aquatics Centre.

There were 17 competitors from 12 countries who took part in this event. Three heats were held. The heat in which a swimmer competed did not formally matter for advancement, as the swimmers with the top eight times from the entire field qualified for the finals.

Japan finished one-two in this event, Takeshi Matsuda and Ryusuke Sakata won the gold and silver medal respectively. Chen Yin from China won the bronze medal, defending champion Wu Peng only finished fourth.

== Schedule ==
All times are China Standard Time (UTC+08:00)

Date	Time	Event
Saturday, 13 November 2010	09:41	Heats
Saturday, 13 November 2010	18:57	Final

== Records ==
Prior to this competition, the existing world, Asian and Games records were as follows.

World Record	Michael Phelps (USA)	1:51.51	Rome, Italy	29 July 2009
Asian Record	Takeshi Matsuda (JPN)	1:52.97	Beijing, China	13 August 2008
Games Record	Wu Peng (CHN)	1:54.91	Doha, Qatar	2 December 2006

== Results ==
=== Heats ===
Rank	Heat	Athlete	Time	Notes
1	2	Hsu Chi-chieh (TPE)	1:57.57	
2	3	Takeshi Matsuda (JPN)	1:58.27	
3	2	Wu Peng (CHN)	1:58.46	
4	3	Ryusuke Sakata (JPN)	1:58.47	
5	1	Chen Yin (CHN)	1:59.23	
6	3	Chang Gyu-cheol (KOR)	1:59.26	
7	1	Daniel Bego (MAS)	2:01.52	
8	1	Võ Thái Nguyên (VIE)	2:03.74	
9	1	Rehan Poncha (IND)	2:03.96	
10	2	Rainer Ng (SIN)	2:04.39	
11	3	Triady Fauzi Sidiq (INA)	2:05.28	
12	3	Sergey Pankov (UZB)	2:05.73	
13	2	Bae Joon-mo (KOR)	2:05.82	
14	1	Fedor Shkilyov (KAZ)	2:06.83	
15	3	Maksim Danilenko (UZB)	2:08.40	
16	2	Kevin Lim (MAS)	2:08.59	
17	2	Abdulaziz Al-Marzooqi (QAT)	2:27.43	

=== Final ===
Rank	Athlete	Time	Notes
1st place, gold medalist(s)	Takeshi Matsuda (JPN)	1:54.02	GR
2nd place, silver medalist(s)	Ryusuke Sakata (JPN)	1:55.23	
3rd place, bronze medalist(s)	Chen Yin (CHN)	1:55.29	
4	Wu Peng (CHN)	1:55.34	
5	Hsu Chi-chieh (TPE)	1:57.46	
6	Chang Gyu-cheol (KOR)	1:59.07	
7	Daniel Bego (MAS)	2:01.02	
8	Võ Thái Nguyên (VIE)	2:04.73	
