= Swimming at the 2010 Asian Games – Men's 4 × 100 metre freestyle relay =

Men's 4 × 100 metre freestyle relay at the 2010 Asian Games
- Venue: Aoti Aquatics Centre
- Date: 16 November 2010
- Competitors: 64 from 15 nations

Medalists
| gold medal | China; Shi Tengfei, Jiang Haiqi, Shi Runqiang, Lü Zhiwu, Chen Zuo, Liu Junwu |
| silver medal | Japan; Takuro Fujii, Rammaru Harada, Shunsuke Kuzuhara, Sho Uchida, Yuki Kobori, Yoshihiro Okumura |
| bronze medal | South Korea; Kim Yong-sik, Bae Joon-mo, Park Seon-kwan, Park Tae-hwan, Jung Won-yong, Kim Min-gyu, Lee Hyun-seung, Park Min-kyu |

The men's 4 × 100 metre freestyle relay event at the 2010 Asian Games took place on 16 November 2010 at Guangzhou Aoti Aquatics Centre.

There were 15 teams who took part in this event. Two heats were held. The heat in which a team competed did not formally matter for advancement, as the teams with the top eight times from the both field qualified for the finals.

China won the gold medal.

== Schedule ==
All times are China Standard Time (UTC+08:00)

| Date | Time | Event |
|---|---|---|
| Tuesday, 16 November 2010 | 10:23 | Heats |
| Tuesday, 16 November 2010 | 19:35 | Final |

== Records ==
Prior to this competition, the existing world, Asian and Games records were as follows.

| World Record | United States | 3:08.24 | Beijing, China | 11 August 2008 |
| Asian Record | Japan | 3:14.73 | Hong Kong | 8 December 2009 |
| Games Record | Japan | 3:18.95 | Doha, Qatar | 5 December 2006 |

== Results ==
Legend

- DNS — Did not start

=== Heats ===
| Rank | Heat | Team | Time | Notes |
|---|---|---|---|---|
| 1 | 1 | China (CHN) | 3:18.80 | GR |
| | | Chen Zuo | 50.22 | |
| | | Liu Junwu | 49.65 | |
| | | Shi Runqiang | 49.53 | |
| | | Jiang Haiqi | 49.40 | |
| 2 | 2 | Japan (JPN) | 3:19.11 | |
| | | Yuki Kobori | 50.68 | |
| | | Rammaru Harada | 49.30 | |
| | | Shunsuke Kuzuhara | 49.52 | |
| | | Yoshihiro Okumura | 49.61 | |
| 3 | 2 | South Korea (KOR) | 3:24.33 | |
| | | Jung Won-yong | 52.54 | |
| | | Kim Min-gyu | 51.52 | |
| | | Lee Hyun-seung | 50.32 | |
| | | Park Min-kyu | 49.95 | |
| 4 | 2 | Kazakhstan (KAZ) | 3:25.01 | |
| | | Artur Dilman | 51.12 | |
| | | Oleg Rabota | 51.97 | |
| | | Alexandr Ivanov | 51.57 | |
| | | Stanislav Kuzmin | 50.35 | |
| 5 | 2 | Hong Kong (HKG) | 3:25.27 | |
| | | David Wong | 50.93 | |
| | | Derick Ng | 51.52 | |
| | | Kent Cheung | 51.54 | |
| | | Lum Ching Tat | 51.28 | |
| 6 | 1 | Philippines (PHI) | 3:27.32 | |
| | | Daniel Coakley | 52.10 | |
| | | Miguel Molina | 51.09 | |
| | | Jessie Lacuna | 51.90 | |
| | | Charles Walker | 52.23 | |
| 7 | 2 | Uzbekistan (UZB) | 3:27.43 | |
| | | Daniil Tulupov | 51.18 | |
| | | Dmitriy Shvetsov | 52.99 | |
| | | Aleksey Derlyugov | 51.53 | |
| | | Petr Romashkin | 51.73 | |
| 8 | 2 | Singapore (SIN) | 3:27.92 | |
| | | Joshua Lim | 52.66 | |
| | | Nicholas Tan | 52.99 | |
| | | Danny Yeo | 51.00 | |
| | | Clement Lim | 51.27 | |
| 9 | 1 | Iran (IRI) | 3:28.05 | |
| | | Soroush Khajegi | 52.89 | |
| | | Pasha Vahdati | 52.51 | |
| | | Saeid Maleka Ashtiani | 51.31 | |
| | | Mohammad Bidarian | 51.34 | |
| 10 | 1 | India (IND) | 3:29.71 | |
| | | Aaron D'Souza | 51.93 | |
| | | Arjun Jayaprakash | 53.22 | |
| | | Anshul Kothari | 52.91 | |
| | | Virdhawal Khade | 51.65 | |
| 11 | 2 | Malaysia (MAS) | 3:32.69 | |
| | | Foo Jian Beng | 51.93 | |
| | | Daniel Bego | 51.47 | |
| | | Kevin Yeap | 54.23 | |
| | | Kevin Lim | 55.06 | |
| 12 | 1 | Indonesia (INA) | 3:40.06 | |
| | | Glenn Victor Sutanto | 59.27 | |
| | | Triady Fauzi Sidiq | 53.21 | |
| | | Guntur Pratama Putera | 52.86 | |
| | | I Gede Siman Sudartawa | 54.72 | |
| 13 | 1 | Macau (MAC) | 3:44.39 | |
| | | Lao Kuan Fong | 54.79 | |
| | | Chou Kit | 58.00 | |
| | | Lei Cheok Fong | 53.94 | |
| | | Chong Cheok Kuan | 57.66 | |
| 14 | 2 | Qatar (QAT) | 3:51.56 | |
| | | Ahmed Atari | 56.49 | |
| | | Mohammed Al-Mahmoud | 58.46 | |
| | | Abdulrahman Al-Ollan | 58.96 | |
| | | Mohammed Hassan | 57.65 | |
| — | 1 | Athletes from Kuwait (IOC) | DNS | |
| | | — | | |
| | | — | | |
| | | — | | |
| | | — | | |

=== Final ===
| Rank | Team | Time | Notes |
|---|---|---|---|
| 1st place, gold medalist(s) | China (CHN) | 3:16.34 | GR |
| | Shi Tengfei | 49.80 | |
| | Jiang Haiqi | 48.71 | |
| | Shi Runqiang | 49.25 | |
| | Lü Zhiwu | 48.58 | |
| 2nd place, silver medalist(s) | Japan (JPN) | 3:16.78 | |
| | Takuro Fujii | 49.10 | |
| | Rammaru Harada | 49.16 | |
| | Shunsuke Kuzuhara | 49.26 | |
| | Sho Uchida | 49.26 | |
| 3rd place, bronze medalist(s) | South Korea (KOR) | 3:19.02 | |
| | Kim Yong-sik | 50.51 | |
| | Bae Joon-mo | 49.94 | |
| | Park Seon-kwan | 50.04 | |
| | Park Tae-hwan | 48.53 | |
| 4 | Kazakhstan (KAZ) | 3:23.54 | |
| | Artur Dilman | 50.77 | |
| | Oleg Rabota | 51.53 | |
| | Alexandr Ivanov | 51.06 | |
| | Stanislav Kuzmin | 50.18 | |
| 5 | Hong Kong (HKG) | 3:24.55 | |
| | David Wong | 50.89 | |
| | Derick Ng | 51.24 | |
| | Kent Cheung | 52.09 | |
| | Lum Ching Tat | 50.33 | |
| 6 | Uzbekistan (UZB) | 3:25.56 | |
| | Daniil Tulupov | 50.70 | |
| | Dmitriy Shvetsov | 52.65 | |
| | Aleksey Derlyugov | 50.71 | |
| | Petr Romashkin | 51.50 | |
| 7 | Philippines (PHI) | 3:26.90 | |
| | Charles Walker | 52.26 | |
| | Daniel Coakley | 52.03 | |
| | Jessie Lacuna | 51.54 | |
| | Miguel Molina | 50.97 | |
| 8 | Singapore (SIN) | 3:27.49 | |
| | Nicholas Tan | 53.09 | |
| | Joshua Lim | 52.43 | |
| | Clement Lim | 50.83 | |
| | Danny Yeo | 51.14 | |
