= Swimming at the 2012 Summer Olympics – Men's 200 metre butterfly =

Men's 200 metre butterfly at the Games of the XXX Olympiad
- Venue: London Aquatics Centre
- Date: July 30, 2012 (heats & semifinals); July 31, 2012 (final)
- Competitors: 37 from 28 nations
- Winning time: 1:52.96 AF

Medalists
| 1st place, gold medalist(s) | | Chad le Clos | South Africa |
| 2nd place, silver medalist(s) | | Michael Phelps | United States |
| 3rd place, bronze medalist(s) | | Takeshi Matsuda | Japan |

The men's 200 metre butterfly event at the 2012 Summer Olympics took place on 30–31 July at the London Aquatics Centre in London, United Kingdom.

For the second time at the 2012 Olympic Games, Michael Phelps fell short in his attempt to win the same event three consecutive times, due to a spectacular performance from South Africa's Chad le Clos. Phelps was considered a favorite to win the race, but Le Clos came from third at the final turn to edge out the superstar (and his personal hero) by five-hundredths of a second (0.05) for the gold medal and an African record in 1:52.96. By finishing with a time of 1:53.01, Phelps earned his second silver medal of the games, bringing his overall total to eighteen, and matching Larisa Latynina's record of eighteen medals as the most decorated Olympic athlete of all time. Japan's Takeshi Matsuda managed to repeat his bronze from Beijing four years earlier in 1:53.21.

Austria's Dinko Jukić, who claimed the top seed earlier in the prelims, missed the podium by over a body length with a fourth-place time and a national record in 1:54.35. U.S. swimmer Tyler Clary finished fifth in 1:55.06 to hold off a close battle from Serbia's Velimir Stjepanović (1:55.07) and Poland's three-time Olympic finalist Paweł Korzeniowski (1:55.08) by a hundredth of a second (0.01) each. China's Chen Yin rounded out the historic finale with an eighth-place time in 1:55.18.

Hungary's László Cseh missed a chance to reach the final roster and defend his Olympic silver medal after placing twelfth in the semifinals (1:55.88).

== Records ==
Prior to this competition, the world and Olympic records were:

| World record | Michael Phelps (USA) | 1:51.51 | Rome, Italy | 29 July 2009 |
| Olympic record | Michael Phelps (USA) | 1:52.03 | Beijing, China | 13 August 2008 |

== Results ==
=== Heats ===
| Rank | Heat | Lane | Name | Nationality | Time | Notes |
|---|---|---|---|---|---|---|
| 1 | 5 | 3 | Dinko Jukić | Austria | 1:54.79 | Q |
| 2 | 5 | 6 | Tyler Clary | United States | 1:54.96 | Q |
| 3 | 3 | 7 | Velimir Stjepanović | Serbia | 1:54:99 | Q, NR |
| 4 | 3 | 3 | Chad le Clos | South Africa | 1:55.23 | Q |
| 5 | 5 | 4 | Michael Phelps | United States | 1:55.53 | Q |
| 6 | 3 | 5 | Chen Yin | China | 1:55.60 | Q |
| 7 | 3 | 6 | Kazuya Kaneda | Japan | 1:55.70 | Q |
| 8 | 4 | 4 | Takeshi Matsuda | Japan | 1:55.81 | Q |
| 9 | 4 | 3 | László Cseh | Hungary | 1:55.86 | Q |
| 10 | 3 | 4 | Wu Peng | China | 1:55.88 | Q |
| 11 | 5 | 2 | Paweł Korzeniowski | Poland | 1:56.09 | Q |
| 12 | 5 | 5 | Nick D'Arcy | Australia | 1:56.25 | Q |
| 13 | 4 | 5 | Bence Biczó | Hungary | 1:56.51 | Q |
| 14 | 5 | 1 | Chris Wright | Australia | 1:56.69 | Q |
| 15 | 4 | 1 | Nikolay Skvortsov | Russia | 1:56.76 | Q |
| 16 | 3 | 1 | Ioannis Drymonakos | Greece | 1:56.97 | Q |
| 17 | 4 | 6 | Kaio de Almeida | Brazil | 1:56.99 | |
| 17 | 3 | 2 | Joe Roebuck | Great Britain | 1:56.99 | |
| 19 | 4 | 7 | Marcin Cieślak | Poland | 1:57.07 | |
| 20 | 5 | 7 | Roberto Pavoni | Great Britain | 1:57.55 | |
| 21 | 4 | 2 | Leonardo de Deus | Brazil | 1:58.03 | |
| 22 | 2 | 3 | Pedro Oliveira | Portugal | 1:58.45 | |
| 23 | 4 | 8 | Stefanos Dimitriadis | Greece | 1:58.79 | |
| 24 | 3 | 8 | Robert Žbogar | Slovenia | 1:58.99 | |
| 25 | 2 | 8 | Mauricio Fiol | Peru | 1:59.02 | NR |
| 26 | 5 | 8 | Joseph Schooling | Singapore | 1:59.18 | |
| 27 | 2 | 1 | Marcos Lavado | Venezuela | 1:59.31 | |
| 28 | 2 | 2 | Illya Chuyev | Ukraine | 1:59.65 | |
| 29 | 2 | 5 | Alexandru Coci | Romania | 1:59.67 | |
| 30 | 2 | 7 | Hsu Chi-Chieh | Chinese Taipei | 1:59.81 | |
| 31 | 2 | 6 | David Sharpe | Canada | 1:59.87 | |
| 32 | 1 | 4 | Gal Nevo | Israel | 1:59.98 | |
| 33 | 2 | 4 | Alexandre Liess | Switzerland | 2:00.13 | |
| 34 | 1 | 3 | Omar Pinzón | Colombia | 2:02.32 | |
| 35 | 1 | 6 | Diego Castillo | Panama | 2:04.72 | |
| 36 | 1 | 5 | Yousef Al-Askari | Kuwait | 2:05.41 | |
| 37 | 1 | 2 | Hocine Haciane | Andorra | 2:06.37 | |

=== Semifinals ===
==== Semifinal 1 ====
| Rank | Lane | Name | Nationality | Time | Notes |
|---|---|---|---|---|---|
| 1 | 6 | Takeshi Matsuda | Japan | 1:54.25 | Q |
| 2 | 5 | Chad le Clos | South Africa | 1:54.43 | Q, AF |
| 2 | 3 | Chen Yin | China | 1:54.43 | Q |
| 4 | 4 | Tyler Clary | United States | 1:54.93 | Q |
| 5 | 2 | Wu Peng | China | 1:55.65 | |
| 6 | 7 | Nick D'Arcy | Australia | 1:56.07 | |
| 7 | 8 | Ioannis Drymonakos | Greece | 1:58.05 | |
| 8 | 1 | Chris Wright | Australia | 1:58.56 | |

==== Semifinal 2 ====
| Rank | Lane | Name | Nationality | Time | Notes |
|---|---|---|---|---|---|
| 1 | 3 | Michael Phelps | United States | 1:54.53 | Q |
| 2 | 4 | Dinko Jukić | Austria | 1:54.95 | Q |
| 3 | 7 | Paweł Korzeniowski | Poland | 1:55.04 | Q |
| 4 | 5 | Velimir Stjepanović | Serbia | 1:55.13 | Q |
| 5 | 1 | Bence Biczó | Hungary | 1:55.36 | |
| 6 | 6 | Kazuya Kaneda | Japan | 1:55.56 | |
| 7 | 2 | László Cseh | Hungary | 1:55.88 | |
| 8 | 8 | Nikolay Skvorstov | Russia | 1:56.53 | |

=== Final ===
| Rank | Lane | Name | Nationality | Time | Notes |
|---|---|---|---|---|---|
| 1st place, gold medalist(s) | 5 | Chad le Clos | South Africa | 1:52.96 | AF |
| 2nd place, silver medalist(s) | 6 | Michael Phelps | United States | 1:53.01 | |
| 3rd place, bronze medalist(s) | 4 | Takeshi Matsuda | Japan | 1:53.21 | |
| 4 | 7 | Dinko Jukic | Austria | 1:54.35 | NR |
| 5 | 2 | Tyler Clary | United States | 1:55.06 | |
| 6 | 8 | Velimir Stjepanović | Serbia | 1:55.07 | |
| 7 | 1 | Paweł Korzeniowski | Poland | 1:55.08 | |
| 8 | 3 | Chen Yin | China | 1:55.18 | |
