= Swimming at the 2010 Asian Games – Men's 100 metre freestyle =

Men's 100 metre freestyle at the 2010 Asian Games
- Venue: Aoti Aquatics Centre
- Date: 17 November 2010
- Competitors: 41 from 26 nations

Medalists
gold medal	Park Tae-hwan	South Korea
silver medal	Lü Zhiwu	China
bronze medal	Takuro Fujii	Japan

The men's 100 metre freestyle event at the 2010 Asian Games took place on 17 November 2010 at Guangzhou Aoti Aquatics Centre.

There were 41 competitors from 26 countries who took part in this events. Six heats were held, with most containing the maximum number of swimmers (eight). The heat in which a swimmer competed did not formally matter for advancement, as the swimmers with the top eight times from the entire field qualified for the finals.

Park Tae-hwan from South Korea won the gold medal with 48.70 seconds.

== Schedule ==
All times are China Standard Time (UTC+08:00)

Date	Time	Event
Wednesday, 17 November 2010	09:12	Heats
Wednesday, 17 November 2010	18:06	Final

== Records ==
Prior to this competition, the existing world, Asian and Games records were as follows.

World Record	César Cielo (BRA)	46.91	Rome, Italy	30 July 2009
Asian Record	Takuro Fujii (JPN)	48.49	Hong Kong	8 December 2009
Games Record	Chen Zuo (CHN)	49.06	Doha, Qatar	6 December 2006

== Results ==
Legend

- DNS — Did not start

=== Heats ===
Rank	Heat	Athlete	Time	Notes
1	4	Park Tae-hwan (KOR)	49.85	
2	5	Shi Tengfei (CHN)	49.91	
3	6	Lü Zhiwu (CHN)	50.27	
3	6	Takuro Fujii (JPN)	50.27	
5	5	Sho Uchida (JPN)	50.50	
6	4	Wang Shao-an (TPE)	50.62	
7	4	Park Min-kyu (KOR)	50.71	
8	5	David Wong (HKG)	50.91	
9	5	Daniil Tulupov (UZB)	51.04	
10	6	Stanislav Kuzmin (KAZ)	51.05	
11	4	Artur Dilman (KAZ)	51.20	
12	5	Daniel Bego (MAS)	51.22	
13	3	Virdhawal Khade (IND)	51.25	
14	6	Lum Ching Tat (HKG)	51.27	
15	5	Foo Jian Beng (MAS)	51.71	
16	4	Abdullah Al-Thuwaini (IOC)	51.81	
17	5	Danny Yeo (SIN)	51.92	
18	5	Mohammad Bidarian (IRI)	52.13	
19	4	Triady Fauzi Sidiq (INA)	52.22	
20	6	Clement Lim (SIN)	52.29	
21	4	Petr Romashkin (UZB)	52.33	
22	6	Charles Walker (PHI)	52.40	
23	3	Aaron D'Souza (IND)	52.71	
23	4	Daniel Coakley (PHI)	52.71	
25	3	Hoàng Quý Phước (VIE)	52.74	
26	6	Guntur Pratama Putera (INA)	52.85	
27	3	Sarit Tiewong (THA)	53.14	
28	3	Pasha Vahdati (IRI)	53.25	
29	6	Mohammad Madwa (IOC)	53.57	
30	3	Lao Kuan Fong (MAC)	53.68	
31	2	Lei Cheok Fong (MAC)	53.75	
31	3	Kareem Ennab (JOR)	53.75	
33	2	Loai Tashkandi (KSA)	53.84	
34	2	Andreý Molçanow (TKM)	54.50	
35	3	Hazem Tashkandi (KSA)	55.44	
36	2	Rami Anis (SYR)	55.59	
37	1	Mohammed Al-Mahmoud (QAT)	59.48	
38	1	Naser Juda (PLE)	1:01.44	
39	2	Erdenebilegiin Byambasüren (MGL)	1:03.58	
40	1	Alisher Changizov (TJK)	1:09.34	
—	2	Omar Yusuf (BRN)	DNS	

=== Final ===
Rank	Athlete	Time	Notes
1st place, gold medalist(s)	Park Tae-hwan (KOR)	48.70	GR
2nd place, silver medalist(s)	Lü Zhiwu (CHN)	48.98	
3rd place, bronze medalist(s)	Takuro Fujii (JPN)	49.37	
4	Shi Tengfei (CHN)	50.02	
5	Sho Uchida (JPN)	50.07	
6	Wang Shao-an (TPE)	50.34	
7	Park Min-kyu (KOR)	50.43	
8	David Wong (HKG)	50.89	
