= Takeshi Matsuda =

Japanese swimmer (born 1984)

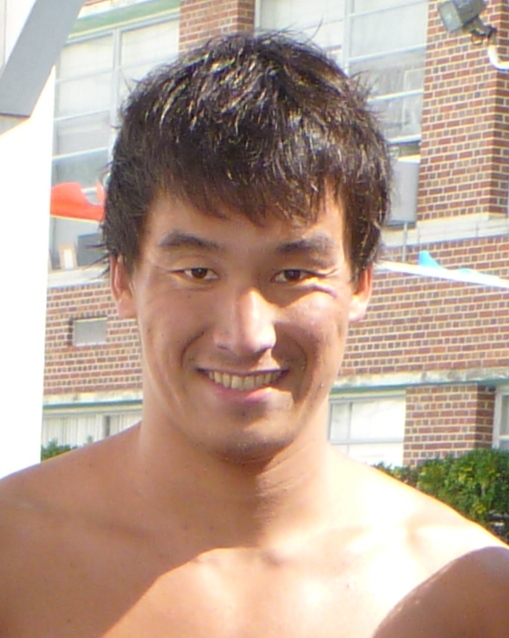
- Takeshi Matsuda 2011

Personal information
- Full name: Takeshi Matsuda
- Nationality: Japan
- Born: June 23, 1984 (age 42) Nobeoka, Miyazaki
- Height: 1.84 m (6 ft 0 in)
- Weight: 81 kg (179 lb)

Sport
- Sport: Swimming
- Strokes: butterfly, freestyle
Medal record
Men's swimming
Representing Japan
Olympic Games
Silver medal – second place	2012 London	4×100 m medley
Bronze medal – third place	2008 Beijing	200 m butterfly
Bronze medal – third place	2012 London	200 m butterfly
Bronze medal – third place	2016 Rio de Janeiro	4×200 m freestyle
World Championships (LC)
Silver medal – second place	2005 Montreal	200 m butterfly
Silver medal – second place	2011 Shanghai	200 m butterfly
Bronze medal – third place	2009 Rome	200 m butterfly
Pan Pacific Championships
Silver medal – second place	2010 Irvine	4×200 m freestyle
Silver medal – second place	2014 Gold Coast	4×200 m freestyle
Bronze medal – third place	2006 Victoria	200 m butterfly
Bronze medal – third place	2010 Irvine	200 m butterfly
Bronze medal – third place	2010 Irvine	800 m freestyle
Asian Games
Gold medal – first place	2006 Doha	4×200 m freestyle
Gold medal – first place	2010 Guangzhou	200 m butterfly
Gold medal – first place	2014 Incheon	4×200 m freestyle
Silver medal – second place	2006 Doha	200 m butterfly
Silver medal – second place	2010 Guangzhou	4×200 m freestyle
Bronze medal – third place	2002 Busan	200 m butterfly
Bronze medal – third place	2006 Doha	400 m freestyle
Bronze medal – third place	2006 Doha	1500 m freestyle
Bronze medal – third place	2010 Guangzhou	200 m freestyle
Universiade
Gold medal – first place	2003 Daegu	200 m butterfly

Takeshi Matsuda (松田 丈志, Matsuda Takeshi; born June 23, 1984) is a retired Japanese Olympic, Asian and National Record holding swimmer. He swam for Japan at the 2004, 2008 Olympics, 2012 Olympics, and 2016 Olympics, winning four medals. At the 2008 Olympics, he won a bronze medal in the men's 200 m butterfly in an Asian Record of 1:52.97; in doing so, he also set the Japanese Record in the event. On November 12, 2011, Matsuda set a new Japanese record (1:49.50) at the FINA World Cup for the short course 200 m butterfly. In doing so, he became just the third swimmer in history to break the 1:50 barrier for the event.

== Career ==
=== Early years ===
Matsuda was born in the rural town of Nobeoka, Miyazaki, where he began swimming at the age of 4 at a local pool. Since then, he has trained with the same coach, Yumiko Kuze, a rare female coach in the world of men's swimming. She was a swimmer in her youth and began as a volunteer coach at the local pool (personal interview).

=== 2004 Olympics ===
At the 2004 Olympic Games, Matsuda placed 8th in the 400 m freestyle final.

=== 2008 Olympics ===
In the final of the men's 200m butterfly at the 2008 Olympics, he finished 3rd to claim bronze. He came behind Michael Phelps and László Cseh, with a time of 1:52.97, an Asian record.

=== 2012 Olympics ===
At the 2012 Olympics, Matsuda won two medals. He defended his bronze medal in the 200 meter butterfly and swam the butterfly leg for Japan's silver medal-winning relay team in the 4 × 100 meter medley relay with Ryosuke Irie, Kosuke Kitajima, and Takuro Fujii. He also swam the 100 meter butterfly, where he tied for sixteenth in the heats and subsequently lost a swim-off with Benjamin Starke of Germany, shutting him out of the semifinals.

=== 2016 Olympics ===
At his final Olympics, Matsuda won a bronze medal in the 4 × 200 metre freestyle relay.

== Personal bests ==
In long course

- 400m freestyle: 3:44.99 Former Japanese Record (August 9, 2008)
- 800m freestyle: 7:49.65 Japanese Record (April 19, 2009)
- 200m butterfly: 1:52.97 Asian Record (August 13, 2008)

In short course

- 200m butterfly: 1:49.50 Former Japanese Record (November 12, 2011)

== See also ==
- List of Japanese records in swimming
- List of Asian records in swimming
