= Alexandru Coci =

Romanian swimmer

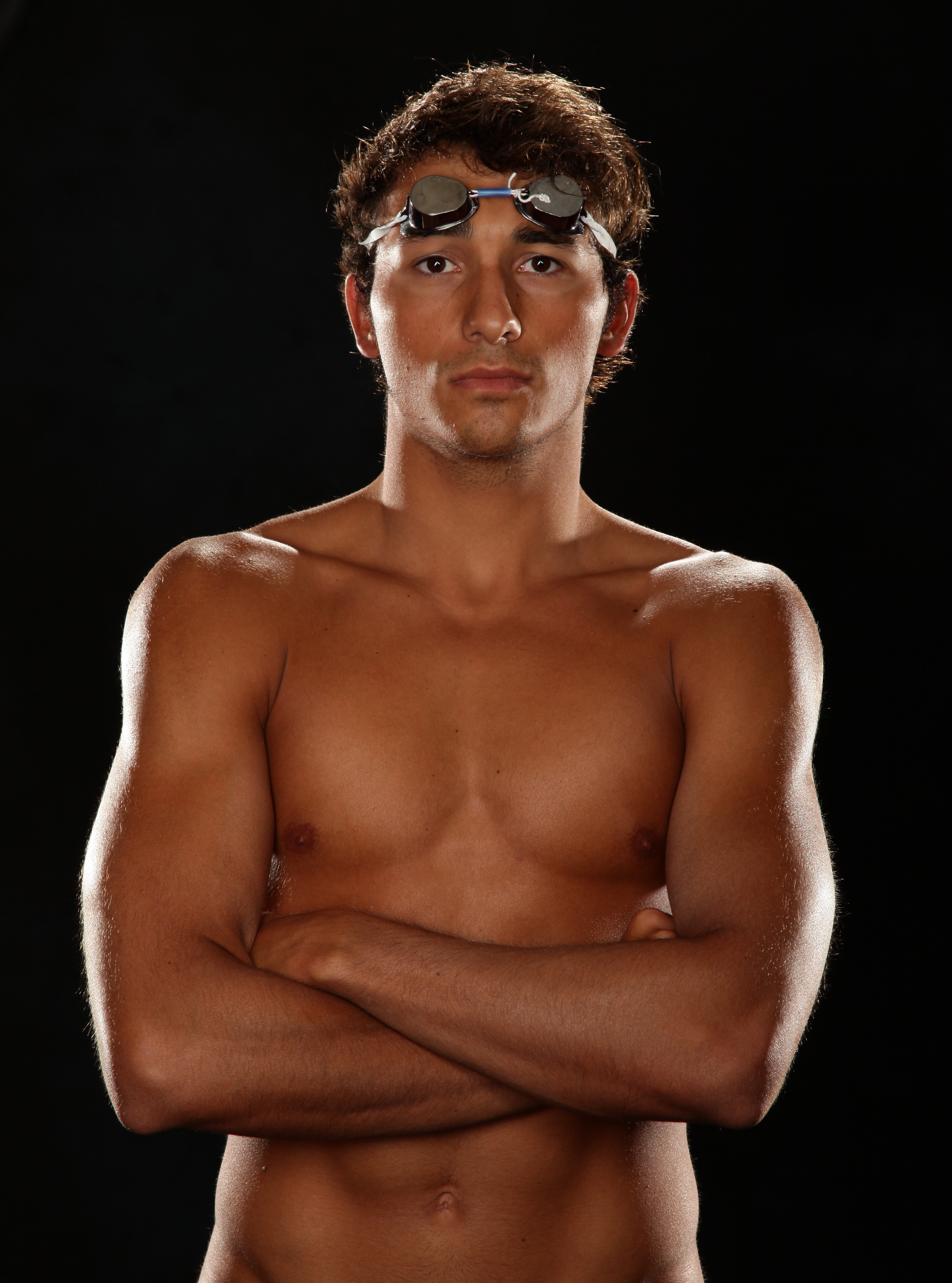

Personal information
- Nationality: Romania United Kingdom
- Born: 31 October 1989 (age 37) Baia Mare, Romania
- Height: 1.78 m (5 ft 10 in)
- Weight: 72 kg (159 lb)

Sport
- Sport: Swimming
- Strokes: Freestyle, butterfly
- Club: LPS Baia Mare (ROU), CSM Brasov (ROU), Universitatea Cluj (ROU), Crimson Tide (USA), Sun Devil Aquatics (USA), Phoenix Swim Club (USA)
- College team: Alabama Crimson Tide (USA), Arizona State University (USA)
- Coach: Ioan Gherghel (ROU)

Alexandru Coci (born October 31, 1989) is a Romanian swimmer, who specialized in butterfly events. He is a Romanian swimming champion and record holder in butterfly, individual medley, relay events, and honorable mention All-American in the 100 m butterfly. Coci also became the first swimmer for the University of Alabama to break a 47-second barrier, when he posted a time of 46.50 seconds in the same stroke at the NCAA Division I Championships.

Coci qualified for the men's 200 m butterfly at the 2012 Summer Olympics in London, by eclipsing a FINA B-standard entry time of 1:58.42 from the European Championships in Debrecen, Hungary. He challenged seven other swimmers on the second heat, including former semifinalist Hsu Chi-chieh of the Chinese Taipei. Coci cruised to fifth place by 0.02 of a second behind Ukraine's Illya Chuyev in 1:59.67. Coci failed to advance into the semifinals, as he placed twenty-ninth overall in the preliminaries.

Coci was a member of the swimming team for the Alabama Crimson Tide, and a former undergraduate student at the University of Alabama in Tuscaloosa, Alabama. After 2012 Summer Olympics, Coci has transferred schools to Arizona State University where he was coached and trained by former finalist, butterfly swimmer, and three-time Olympian Ioan Gherghel (2000, 2004, and 2008).
