= Illya Chuyev =

Ukrainian swimmer (born 1984)

Personal information
- Full name: Illya Viktorovych Chuyev
- Nationality: Ukraine
- Born: 31 March 1984 (age 42) Zaporizhzhia, Ukrainian SSR, Soviet Union
- Height: 1.86 m (6 ft 1 in)
- Weight: 83 kg (183 lb)

Sport
- Sport: Swimming
- Strokes: Butterfly

Illya Viktorovych Chuyev (Ukrainian: Ілля Вікторович Чуєв; born March 31, 1984, in Zaporizhzhia) is a Ukrainian swimmer, who specialized in butterfly events. Chuyev qualified for the men's 200 m butterfly at the 2012 Summer Olympics in London, by clearing a FINA B-standard entry time of 1:58.88 from the Ukrainian Summer Cup in Kharkiv. He challenged seven other swimmers on the second heat, including former semifinalist Hsu Chi-chieh of the Chinese Taipei. Chuyev edged out Romania's Alexandru Coci to notch a fourth spot by two hundredths of a second (0.02) in 1:59.65. Chuyev failed to advance into the semifinals, as he placed twenty-eighth overall in the preliminaries.
