= Tyler McGill =

American swimmer (born 1987)

Personal information
- Full name: Tyler Tennant McGill
- Nicknames: Dad, The Wombat
- National team: United States
- Born: August 18, 1987 (age 39) Champaign, Illinois, U.S.
- Height: 5 ft 11 in (180 cm)
- Weight: 174 lb (79 kg)

Sport
- Sport: Swimming
- Strokes: Butterfly
- College team: Auburn University
Medal record
Men's swimming
Representing the United States
Olympic Games
Gold medal – first place	2012 London	4×100 m medley
World Championships (LC)
Gold medal – first place	2009 Rome	4×100 m medley
Gold medal – first place	2011 Shanghai	4×100 m medley
Bronze medal – third place	2011 Shanghai	100 m butterfly
World Championships (SC)
Gold medal – first place	2010 Dubai	4×100 m medley
Pan Pacific Championships
Silver medal – second place	2010 Irvine	100 m butterfly

Tyler Tennant McGill (born August 18, 1987) is an American former competition swimmer who is a butterfly specialist and has been a member of two world champion relay teams from the United States. He was a member of the 2012 United States Olympic Team and earned a gold medal as a member of the winning U.S. team in the 4×100-meter medley relay at the 2012 Summer Olympics.

== Career ==
McGill attended Champaign Central High School in Champaign, Illinois. McGill attended Auburn University, and competed for the Auburn Tigers swimming and diving team under head coach Brett Hawke from 2007 to 2010. During his four years of college swimming, he won NCAA championships in the 4x100-yard freestyle relay and the 4×100-yard medley relay, and an SEC championship in the 4x200-yard freestyle relay.

At the 2009 U.S. Nationals and World Championship Trials, McGill placed second to Michael Phelps in the 100-meter butterfly with a time of 51.06, earning a place to compete at the 2009 World Aquatics Championships in Rome. At the World Championships, McGill placed seventh in the 100-meter butterfly with a time of 51.42. He also competed in the 50-meter butterfly and placed 36th in 23.93. McGill swam in the preliminaries of the 4×100-meter medley relay for the U.S. team, which advanced to the final and won the gold medal.

At the 2011 World Aquatics Championships in Shanghai, China, McGill won a bronze medal in the 100-meter butterfly, finishing behind Michael Phelps and Konrad Czerniak. On the last day of competition, McGill won a gold medal in the 4×100-meter medley relay for his contributions in the heats.

At the 2012 U.S. Olympic Trials in Omaha, Nebraska, the qualifying meet for the U.S. Olympic team, McGill placed second in the 100-meter butterfly event with a time of 51.32 seconds, just behind Michael Phelps and just ahead of Ryan Lochte. At the 2012 Summer Olympics in London, McGill placed sixth the 100-meter butterfly, and earned a gold medal by swimming in the preliminaries for the winning U.S. team in the 4×100-meter medley relay.

== See also ==
- Auburn Tigers
- List of Auburn University people
- List of Olympic medalists in swimming (men)
- List of United States records in swimming
- List of World Aquatics Championships medalists in swimming (men)
