= Xue Ruipeng =

Chinese swimmer (born 1988)

Personal information
- Born: March 20, 1988 (age 38) Taiyuan, Shanxi

Sport
- Sport: Swimming
Medal record
Representing China
Asian Games
Silver medal – second place	2010 Guangzhou	200m breaststroke

Xue Ruipeng (born March 20, 1988) is a Chinese swimmer, who competed for Team China at the 2008 Summer Olympics. Currently coaching for the national swimming squad of Hong Kong.

== Major achievements ==
- 2005 East Asian Games - 2nd 200m breast
- 2008 National Champions Tournament - 1st 200m breast
