= Nicholas Tan =

Singaporean swimmer

Personal information
- Nationality: Singaporean
- Height: 1.85 m (6 ft 1 in)
- Weight: 73 kg (161 lb)

Sport
- Sport: Swimming
- Strokes: Freestyle, Butterfly
- Club: Swimfast Aquatic Club
Medal record
Men's swimming
Representing Singapore
Southeast Asian Games
Gold medal – first place	2007 Singapore	4×100 m freestyle relay
Bronze medal – third place	2007 Singapore	50m freestyle
Singapore National Championships
Bronze medal – third place	2007 Singapore	Men 100 LC m freestyle
Bronze medal – third place	2007 Singapore	Men 100 LC m butterfly
Bronze medal – third place	2007 Singapore	Men 200 LC m freestyle

Nicholas Tan is a Singaporean former national swimmer and model. Tan has represented Singapore at the Southeast Asian Games (SEA Games), the Asian Games, World Championship and FINA Swimming World Cup. He is the gold medallist in the men's 4 × 100 m freestyle relay in the 2007 Southeast Asian Games. He holds a number of national records in the 100 butterfly, 50 butterfly and 400 free relay.

== Early life and education ==
Tan was born and raised in Singapore. His early years of education were spent at the Raffles Institution and Raffles Junior College where he learned swimming and started competing at the age of 13. He later joined the Swimfast Aquatic Club, where he was trained and went to represent Singapore at his first international competition at the age of 15.

While in high school, Tan was also involved in biomedical research and presented one of his research papers on stem cells at the 2007 World Congress in Computer Science, Computer Engineering, and Applied Computing at the age of 18. He was nominated for Best Paper Award at the World Congress on Engineering 2007.

Tan went to Harvard University and graduated with a Bachelor of Arts in Biology. While at Harvard, Tan participated in three NCAA Division I Swimming Championships. He won 200 butterfly in 1:51.27 in the first collegiate meet against Cornell and Dartmouth at the 2008 NCAA Division I Men's Swimming and Diving Championships. His other titles came from the 100 butterfly and 100 freestyle with a time of 47.06.

== Career ==
Tan first joined the Singapore National Team when he was 15. At the age of 18, Tan broke the open national record of Ang Peng Siong in the 100 butterfly and 50m butterfly. He competed in the Singapore National Championships in 2007 and won 3 titles in 100m freestyle, 100m butterfly and 200m butterfly.

Tan's major breakthrough came during the 2007 Southeast Asian Games, where he won a gold medal for Singapore in the 4 × 100 m freestyle relay in 54.79 sec and a bronze in the 50m freestyle. In that year, he also competed at the World Aquatics Championships and 2007 FINA Swimming World Cup.

In 2010, Tan participated in the Asian Games and took part in four events including 100 m butterfly, 4 × 100 m freestyle relay, 50 metre butterfly and stood 4th position in the 4 × 100 metre medley relay together with Lionel Khoo, Rainer Ng and Clement Lim.

== Recent life and work ==
In 2014, Tan started modeling after being selected by European brand Dolce & Gabbana for its international advertising campaign. He also appeared in various magazines including Esquire, GQ, Men's Folio and August Man.

Tan was also a founding team member of Garena(Shopee), an e-commerce platform based in Singapore which later became Sea Ltd and IPOed for $1 billion USD.

In 2015, he co-founded East Ocean Capital, an investment holding and business incubator firm.

In 2016, Tan worked on a shopping mall project in South Africa called Home Africa.

In April 2021, Tan became the Chief Financial Officer of Ace Global Business Acquisition Limited, a NASDAQ listed SPAC.

Tan was included in Forbes China's list of 30 under 30 in 2019.

== Research works ==
- Tan, Nicholas Xue Wei et al. "Towards A Serum-Free Medium: Growth Receptors And Signaling Pathways That Regulate Multipotency In Human Mesenchymal Stem Cells." World Congress on Engineering (2007).
- Tan, Nicholas X.; Tan, Grace X.; Yang, Li-Gang; Yang, Bin; Powers (16 September 2013). "Temporal Trends in Syphilis and Gonorrhea Incidences in Guangdong Province, China". The Journal of Infectious Diseases. 209 (3): 426–430. doi:10.1093/infdis/jit496. ISSN 1537-6613. PMC 3883174. PMID 24041788.
- Tan, Nicholas X.; Rydzak, Chara; Yang, Li-Gang; Vickerman, Peter (22 January 2013). "Prioritizing Congenital Syphilis Control in South China: A Decision Analytic Model to Inform Policy Implementation". PLOS Medicine. 10 (1) e1001375. doi:10.1371/journal.pmed.1001375. PMC 3551934. PMID 23349624.
- Tan, Nicholas X.; Messina, Jane P.; Yang, Li-Gang; Yang, Bin (6 May 2011). "A Spatial Analysis of County-level Variation in Syphilis and Gonorrhea in Guangdong Province, China". PLOS ONE. 6 (5) e19648. Bibcode:2011PLoSO...619648T. doi:10.1371/journal.pone.0019648. ISSN 1932-6203. PMC 3089632. PMID 21573127.
- Tan, Nicholas X.; Tucker, Joseph D. (June 2012). "Inequality and infection in China". International Journal of Infectious Diseases. 16 (6): e468. doi:10.1016/j.ijid.2012.02.008. PMID 22486856.
- Tan, Nicholas; Tucker, J.; Rydzak, C.; Yang, L. G.; Peeling, R.; Chen, X. S. (10 July 2011). "P1-S1.47 Measuring and prioritising congenital syphilis control in Guangdong China - a Markov model to inform policy implementation". Sexually Transmitted Infections. 87 (Suppl 1): A118–A119. doi:10.1136/sextrans-2011-050108.47.
