= Swimming at the 2010 Asian Games – Men's 50 metre freestyle =

Men's 50 metre freestyle at the 2010 Asian Games
- Venue: Aoti Aquatics Centre
- Date: 15 November 2010
- Competitors: 44 from 31 nations

Medalists
gold medal	Lü Zhiwu	China
silver medal	Masayuki Kishida	Japan
bronze medal	Rammaru Harada	Japan

The men's 50 metre freestyle event at the 2010 Asian Games took place on 15 November 2010 at Guangzhou Aoti Aquatics Centre.

There were 44 competitors from 31 countries who took part in this event. Six heats were held, with most containing the maximum number of swimmers (eight). The heat in which a swimmer competed did not formally matter for advancement, as the swimmers with the top eight times from the entire field qualified for the finals.

Lü Zhiwu from China won the gold medal with 22.37 seconds, two Japanese swimmers Masayuki Kishida and Rammaru Harada won the silver and bronze medal respectively.

== Schedule ==
All times are China Standard Time (UTC+08:00)

Date	Time	Event
Monday, 15 November 2010	09:09	Heats
Monday, 15 November 2010	18:06	Final

== Records ==
Prior to this competition, the existing world, Asian and Games records were as follows.

World Record	César Cielo (BRA)	20.91	São Paulo, Brazil	18 December 2009
Asian Record	Shi Runqiang (CHN)	21.95	Beijing, China	28 August 2009
Games Record	Jiang Chengji (CHN)	22.38	Bangkok, Thailand	11 December 1998

== Results ==
Legend

- DNS — Did not start

=== Heats ===
Rank	Heat	Athlete	Time	Notes
1	5	Lü Zhiwu (CHN)	22.44	
2	4	Rammaru Harada (JPN)	22.71	
3	6	Masayuki Kishida (JPN)	22.86	
4	6	Park Min-kyu (KOR)	22.90	
5	6	Virdhawal Khade (IND)	22.98	
6	6	Shi Runqiang (CHN)	23.10	
7	4	Lum Ching Tat (HKG)	23.16	
8	5	Wang Shao-an (TPE)	23.20	
9	5	Stanislav Kuzmin (KAZ)	23.23	
10	4	Artur Dilman (KAZ)	23.39	
11	5	Daniil Tulupov (UZB)	23.57	
12	4	Arwut Chinnapasaen (THA)	23.58	
13	6	Pasha Vahdati (IRI)	23.70	
14	5	Kim Yong-sik (KOR)	23.72	
15	4	Yan Ho Chun (HKG)	23.74	
16	5	Daniel Coakley (PHI)	23.82	
17	6	Mohammad Bidarian (IRI)	23.83	
18	5	Lao Kuan Fong (MAC)	23.89	
19	3	Danny Yeo (SIN)	24.00	
20	4	Foo Jian Beng (MAS)	24.05	
21	5	Kareem Ennab (JOR)	24.09	
22	4	Clement Lim (SIN)	24.12	
23	6	Danil Bugakov (UZB)	24.19	
24	4	Vasilii Danilov (KGZ)	24.25	
25	6	Mohammad Madwa (IOC)	24.31	
26	3	Arjun Jayaprakash (IND)	24.34	
27	3	Guntur Pratama Putera (INA)	24.41	
28	3	Lei Cheok Fong (MAC)	24.63	
29	3	Andreý Molçanow (TKM)	25.00	
30	3	Heshan Unamboowe (SRI)	25.08	
31	3	Rami Fetyani (KSA)	25.09	
32	3	Omar Yusuf (BRN)	25.11	
33	1	Mohammed Hassan (QAT)	26.01	
34	1	Mohammed Al-Mahmoud (QAT)	26.02	
35	2	Batsaikhany Dölgöön (MGL)	26.50	
36	2	Aung Zaw Phyo (MYA)	26.60	
37	2	Inayath Hassan (MDV)	27.63	
38	2	Hem Thon Ponleu (CAM)	27.68	
39	1	Saylom Souvannala (LAO)	27.84	
40	2	Naser Juda (PLE)	28.04	
41	2	Alisher Changizov (TJK)	29.15	
42	1	Yousef Al-Nehmi (YEM)	29.37	
43	2	Ammar Ghanim (YEM)	29.60	
—	2	Erdenebilegiin Byambasüren (MGL)	DNS	

=== Final ===
Rank	Athlete	Time	Notes
1st place, gold medalist(s)	Lü Zhiwu (CHN)	22.37	GR
2nd place, silver medalist(s)	Masayuki Kishida (JPN)	22.45	
3rd place, bronze medalist(s)	Rammaru Harada (JPN)	22.84	
4	Virdhawal Khade (IND)	22.87	
4	Park Min-kyu (KOR)	22.87	
6	Shi Runqiang (CHN)	22.89	
7	Lum Ching Tat (HKG)	23.15	
8	Wang Shao-an (TPE)	23.16	
