= Kazuya Kaneda =

Japanese swimmer (born 1987)

Personal information
- Full name: Kazuya Kaneda
- Born: November 5, 1987 (age 38) Koganei, Tokyo

Sport
- Sport: Swimming
Medal record
Representing Japan
World Championships (SC)
Gold medal – first place	2012 Istanbul	200 m butterfly
Summer Universiade
Silver medal – second place	2009 Belgrade	200m butterfly

Kazuya Kaneda (金田 和也, Kaneda Kazuya; born November 5, 1987) is a Japanese butterfly swimmer. At the 2012 Summer Olympics, he competed in the Men's 200 metre butterfly, finishing in 7th place overall in the heats, but finished 6th in his semifinal and did not make the final.

He married swimmer Haruka Ueda in 2014.
