= Tyler Reed (swimmer) =

American swimmer

Personal information
- National team: United States
- Born: August 19, 1988 (age 37) Morgantown, Kentucky
- Height: 6 ft 5 in (1.96 m)
- Weight: 220 lb (100 kg)

Sport
- Sport: Swimming
- Strokes: Freestyle
- Club: Southern Kentucky Swim Club
- College team: University of Kentucky
Medal record
Men's swimming
Representing the United States
World Championships (SC)
Gold medal – first place	2012 Istanbul	4×100 m freestyle

Tyler Reed (born 19 August 1988) is an American swimmer who swam for the University of Kentucky. Tyler was a member of the 2012 FINA World Championship Swimming Team competing for the United States. He was a medalist on the Men's 4 × 100 metre freestyle relay for team USA. Tyler was a member of the 2013 World University Games Swimming Team competing for the United States. Tyler swam in the semi-finals of the 100 Freestyle at the 2013 WUGs.
