= Garrett Weber-Gale =

American swimmer (born 1985)

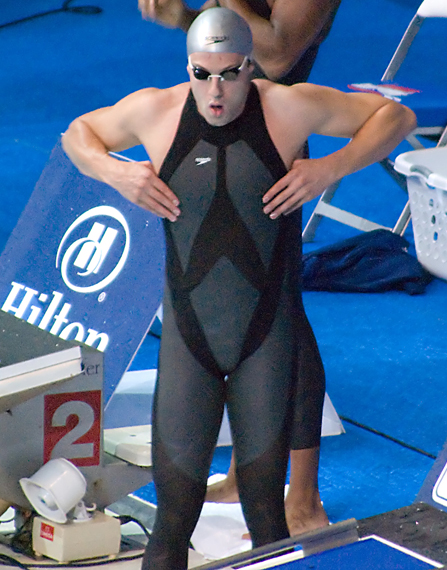
- Weber-Gale in 2009

Personal information
- Nicknames: "G-dubs," "G"
- National team: United States
- Born: August 6, 1985 (age 40) Stevens Point, Wisconsin, U.S.
- Height: 6 ft 2 in (188 cm)
- Weight: 180 lb (82 kg)

Sport
- Sport: Swimming
- Strokes: Freestyle
- Club: Longhorn Aquatics
- College team: University of Texas
Medal record
Men's swimming
Representing United States
Olympic Games
Gold medal – first place	2008 Beijing	4×100 m freestyle
Gold medal – first place	2008 Beijing	4×100 m medley
World Championships (LC)
Gold medal – first place	2005 Montreal	4×100 m freestyle
Gold medal – first place	2007 Melbourne	4×100 m freestyle
Gold medal – first place	2009 Rome	4×100 m freestyle
Gold medal – first place	2011 Shanghai	4×100 m medley
Bronze medal – third place	2011 Shanghai	4×100 m freestyle
World Championships (SC)
Gold medal – first place	2010 Dubai	4×100 m medley
Gold medal – first place	2012 Istanbul	4×100 m freestyle
Gold medal – first place	2012 Istanbul	4×200 m freestyle
Silver medal – second place	2010 Dubai	4×200 m freestyle
Maccabiah Games
Gold medal – first place	2013 Israel	50 m freestyle
Gold medal – first place	2013 Israel	100 m freestyle
Silver medal – second place	2013 Israel	4×200 m freestyle

Garrett Weber-Gale (born August 6, 1985) is an American competition swimmer, two-time Olympic gold medalist, and world record-holder in two events.

== Early life ==
Weber-Gale is Jewish, and was born in Stevens Point, Wisconsin. He graduated from Nicolet High School in Glendale, Wisconsin, in 2003. He then competed for the Texas Longhorns swimming and diving team of the University of Texas from 2003 to 2007 under Hall of Fame Head Coach Eddie Reese and Associate Coach Kris Kubik In 2006, he was the NCAA Division I champion in the 100-yard freestyle.

== Swimming career ==
Weber-Gale won the 100 and 50-meter freestyles at the 2008 U.S. Olympic Trials in 47.92 and 21.47 seconds respectively. His time of 21.47 in the 50-meter was an American record. By clocking a time of 47.78 in the prelims of the 100 freestyle at the Trials, he became the first American to break 48 seconds in that event.

At the 2008 Summer Olympics, Weber-Gale was as a member of the 4 × 100 m freestyle relay team in a final that has been heralded as the best relay in the history of swimming. He was the second leg of that relay and had a split of 47.02 as the US won the gold ahead of pre-race favorite France. Weber-Gale also earned a gold medal for his contribution in the heats of the 4 × 100 m medley relay. Weber-Gale also competed in both the 50 m and 100 m freestyle events but did not advance past the semifinals of either one.

At the 2009 USA Nationals and World Championships trials, Weber-Gale placed third in the 100 m freestyle in 48.19. He also tied for second with Cullen Jones in the 50m freestyle in 21.55, which required a swim-off to decide who would get to compete in the event at the 2009 World Aquatics Championships in Rome. Jones won the swim-off in 21.41, which broke Weber-Gale's American record in the event.

At the 2009 World Championships, Weber-Gale swam the lead-off leg of the 4 × 100 m freestyle preliminaries in 48.30. He earned a gold medal in the event when the US placed first in the final.

In 2013, Weber-Gale was chosen to be the flag bearer for Team USA at the opening ceremonies of the 19th (2013) Maccabiah Games. At the games he won two gold medals; one in 100 m freestyle at 48.99 seconds and a second one in the 50 m freestyle at 0:22:12 (MR). Weber-Gale also won silver in the 4 × 200 m freestyle relay.

== Miscellaneous ==
Weber-Gale began his competitive career as a YMCA age-group swimmer at the Walter Schroeder Aquatic Center in Brown Deer, Wisconsin. He refined his stroke training in Austin, Texas, swimming with Circle C (now Longhorn Aquatics). In 2003, he set a national public high school record while at Nicolet High School in the 100-yard (91 m) freestyle with a time of 43.49. He is a four-time Wisconsin State Champion, twice in the backstroke and once in the freestyle.

Weber-Gale also was a multiple-time Olin-Sang-Ruby Union Institute (a URJ summer camp) triathlon champion.

On November 17, 2008, Weber-Gale won a Golden Goggles award with Beijing relay teammates Michael Phelps, Cullen Jones and Jason Lezak.

On July 19, 2009, Weber-Gale (along with Phelps, Jones and Lezak) received an ESPY Award for Best Moment for their 4 × 100 m freestyle relay performance at the 2008 Beijing Olympics.

Weber-Gale married in Austin, Texas, in the fall of 2013.

== Hall of Fame ==
Weber-Gale was elected to the International Jewish Sports Hall of Fame's induction class of 2015.

== Best swimming times ==
Long Course Meters:

- 50 freestyle: 21.47
- 100 freestyle: 47.78 (First American to break 48 seconds)
- 100 freestyle relay split: 47.02
- 200 freestyle: 1:49.06
- 100 backstroke: 56.48

Short Course Meters:

- 50 freestyle: 21.31
- 100 freestyle: 46.29

Short Course Yards:

- 50 freestyle: 19.16
- 100 freestyle: 41.94
- 200 freestyle: 1:33.53
- 100 backstroke: 47.33

== See also ==
- List of Olympic medalists in swimming (men)
- List of select Jewish swimmers
- List of University of Texas at Austin alumni
- List of World Aquatics Championships medalists in swimming (men)
- World record progression 4 × 100 metres freestyle relay
- World record progression 4 × 100 metres medley relay
