= Naoya Tomita =

Japanese swimmer (born 1989)

冨田 尚弥
Personal information
- Born: April 22, 1989 (age 37) Tōkai, Aichi, Japan
- Height: 1.73 m (5 ft 8 in)

Sport
- Sport: Swimming
Medal record
Representing Japan
World championships (SC)
Gold medal – first place	2010 Dubai	200 m breaststroke
Asian Games
Gold medal – first place	2010 Guangzhou	200 m breaststroke

Naoya Tomita (冨田 尚弥, Tomita Naoya; born April 22, 1989) is a Japanese breaststroke swimmer. In 2010, he won the 200 m event at the World Championships (short course) and at the Asian Games. At the 2014 Asian Games he was caught on surveillance cameras while stealing a video camera belonging to the Yonhap News Agency. He admitted to the fact and paid a fine of 1 million won (ca. US$1000). On October 7, 2014, he was banned for 18 months from competitions by Japan Swimming Federation and fired by his employer, sports apparel manufacturer Descente Ltd.
