= Jiang Haiqi =

Chinese swimmer (born 1992)

Medal record

Men's swimming

Representing China

Olympic Games
Bronze medal – third place	2012 London	4×200 m freestyle

Asian Games
Gold medal – first place	2010 Guangzhou	4 x 100 m freestyle
Gold medal – first place	2010 Guangzhou	4 x 200 m freestyle

Jiang Haiqi (Chinese: 蒋海琦; pinyin: Jiǎng Hǎiqí; born January 17, 1992) is a retired Chinese swimmer and current Chinese water police. He competed for China at the 2012 Summer Olympics, and was part of the Chinese team that won the bronze medal in the 4 x 200 m freestyle relay. He was also part of the team that won the gold medal in the men's 4 x 100 m freestyle and 4 x 200 m freestyle relays at the 2010 Asian Games, in a Games record time.

Having begun swimming at the age of 5 and making his debut for the Chinese national team at 17, Jiang retired in 2015, and began to work for the Shanghai Border, Harbor and Waterway Police. He was brought onto the national team after winning three gold medals at national championships.

== See also ==
- China at the 2012 Summer Olympics - Swimming
