= Dinko Jukić =

Austrian swimmer (born 1989)

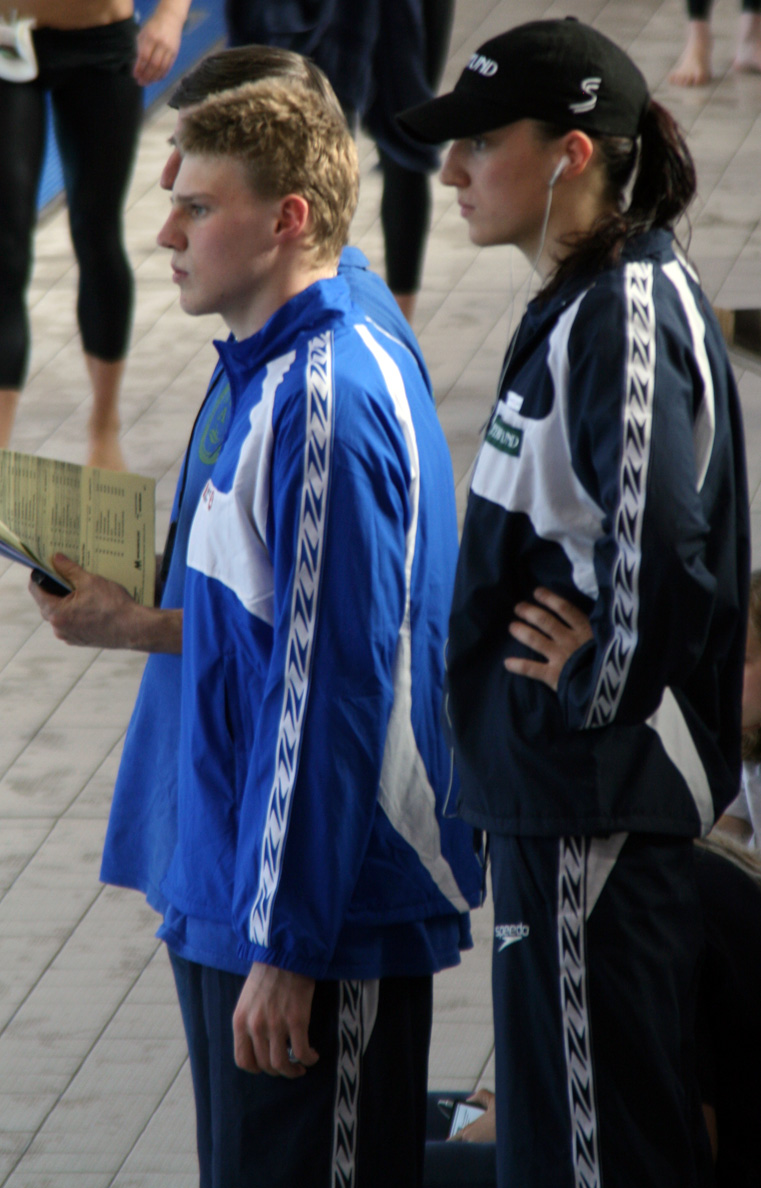
- Dinko Jukić (left) together with his sister Mirna.

Personal information
- Full name: Dinko Jukić
- Nationality: Austria
- Born: 9 January 1989 (age 37) Dubrovnik, SR Croatia, SFR Yugoslavia
- Height: 1.93 m (6 ft 4 in)
- Weight: 84 kg (185 lb)

Sport
- Sport: Swimming
- Strokes: Medley and butterfly
- Club: SC Austria Wien
Medal record
European Championships (LC)
Silver medal – second place	2008 Eindhoven	200 m medley
Bronze medal – third place	2008 Eindhoven	400 m medley
Bronze medal – third place	2008 Eindhoven	4x200 m freestyle
World Championships (SC)
Bronze medal – third place	2008 Manchester	400 m medley
European Championships (SC)
Gold medal – first place	2008 Rijeka	400 m medley
Gold medal – first place	2010 Eindhoven	200 m butterfly
Silver medal – second place	2008 Rijeka	200 m butterfly
Bronze medal – third place	2009 Istanbul	200 m butterfly
Bronze medal – third place	2010 Eindhoven	200 m medley

Dinko Jukić (born 9 January 1989 in Dubrovnik) is a retired medley and butterfly swimmer from Austria of Croatian origin.

== Biography ==
He competed for Austria at the 2008 Summer Olympics in Beijing, China, finishing in tenth place in the men's 200 m butterfly event, 16th in the 200 m individual medley and 15th in the 400 m individual medley.

At the 2012 Summer Olympics in London he managed a 4th-place finish in the men's 200 m butterfly event. Despite setting a new national record of 1:54.35 in the final, he missed the bronze medal by more than a second.

He is the younger brother of swimmer Mirna Jukić.

After suffering a serious back injury in 2012, Jukić came back after 2 years break, posting a new 100 m freestyle national record (January 2015).
