= Chen Yin (swimmer) =

Chinese swimmer (born 1986)

Personal information
- Nationality: China
- Born: Chen Yin; March 29, 1986 (age 40) Hebei
- Height: 1.82 m (6 ft 0 in)
- Weight: 76kg (168 lb)

Sport
- Sport: Swimming
- Strokes: Butterfly
- Club: Hebei Province Team, China
- Coach: Liu Haitao (CHN)
Medal record
Representing China
Summer Universiade
Silver medal – second place	2007 Bangkok	200m butterfly
Asian Games
Bronze medal – third place	2010 Guangzhou	200m butterfly

Chen Yin (born March 29, 1986, in Qinhuangdao, Hebei) is a Chinese former competitive swimmer.

He competed for China at the 2008 and 2012 Summer Olympics, both times in the men's 200 m butterfly.

== Major achievements ==
- 2005 National Games - 2nd 200 m fly;
- 2006 Asian Championships - 1st 200 m fly
