= Sho Uchida =

Japanese swimmer (born 1987)

Medal record

Men's swimming

Representing Japan

Pan Pacific Championships
Silver medal – second place	2010 Irvine	4x200 m freestyle

Summer Universiade
Gold medal – first place	2009 Belgrade	200 m freestyle
Gold medal – first place	2009 Belgrade	4×200 m freestyle
Silver medal – second place	2011 Shenzhen	4x200 m freestyle
Bronze medal – third place	2011 Shenzhen	200 m freestyle
Bronze medal – third place	2011 Shenzhen	400 m freestyle

Sho Uchida (内田 翔, Uchida Shō; born September 28, 1987 in Takasaki, Gunma) is a Japanese freestyle swimmer.

== Major achievements ==
2005 World Championships

- 200m freestyle 17th (1:49.42)
- 400m freestyle 14th (3:50.17)
- 800m freestyle 13th (7:58.00)
- 4 × 200 m freestyle relay 5th (7:13.60)

2008 Beijing Olympics

- 200m freestyle 24th (1:48.34)
- 4 × 200 m freestyle relay 7th (Heat 7:09.12 AS, Final 7:10.31)

2009 World Championships

- 200m freestyle 4th (1:45.24) Japanese Record
- 400m freestyle 25th (3:50.16)

== Personal bests ==
In long course

- 200m freestyle: 1:45.24 Japanese Record (July 28, 2009)
- 400m freestyle: 3:50.17 (July 24, 2005)
