= Benjamin Starke =

German swimmer

Personal information
- Nationality: Germany
- Born: November 25, 1986 (age 39) Cottbus, Brandenburg, East Germany

Sport
- Sport: Swimming
- Strokes: Butterfly
Medal record
World Championships (LC)
Silver medal – second place	2009 Rome	4×100 m medley
Bronze medal – third place	2011 Shanghai	4×100 m medley

Benjamin Starke (born 25 November 1986 in Cottbus, Brandenburg, East Germany) is an Olympic swimmer from Germany. He swam for Germany at the 2008 Olympics and the 2012 Olympics.

He has swum for Germany at:

- Olympics: 2008, 2012
- World Championships: 2005, 2007, and 2011
- Short Course Worlds: 2010

== See also ==
- de:Benjamin Starke—Starke's entry on German Wikipedia
- www.benjaminstarke.de—Starke's website (in German)
