= Masayuki Kishida =

Japanese swimmer (born 1985)

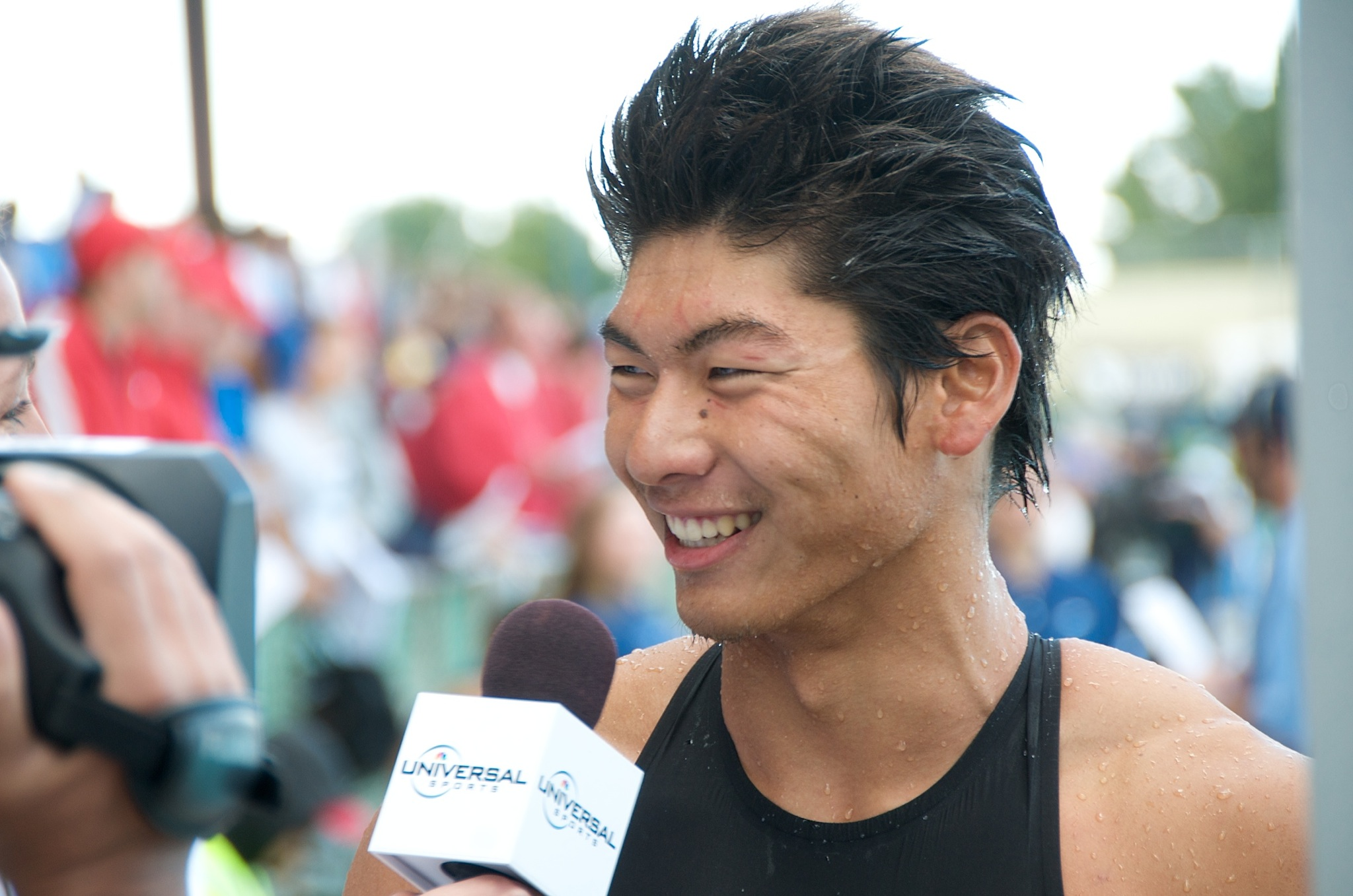

Personal information
- Born: November 24, 1985 (age 40)

Sport
- Sport: Swimming
Medal record
Representing Japan
Summer Universiade
| Gold medal – first place | 2011 Shenzhen | 4x100m medley relay |
Asian Games
| Gold medal – first place | 2010 Guangzhou | 4x100m medley relay |
| Silver medal – second place | 2010 Guangzhou | 50m freestyle |
| Silver medal – second place | 2010 Guangzhou | 50m butterfly |

Masayuki Kishida (岸田 真幸, Kishida Masayuki; born 24 November 1985) is a Japanese swimmer who competed in the 2008 Summer Olympics.
