= Shi Tengfei =

Chinese swimmer (born 1988)

Personal information
- Born: October 5, 1988 (age 37) Beijing, China

Sport
- Sport: Swimming
Medal record
Representing China
Asian Games
Gold medal – first place	2010 Guangzhou	4x100m freestyle relay

Shi Tengfei (born 5 October 1988) is a Chinese swimmer. He competed for China at the 2012 Summer Olympics in the men's 4 × 100 m freestyle relay.
