= Joe Bartoch =

Canadian swimmer (born 1983)

Personal information
- Full name: Joseph Bartoch
- Nickname: "Joe"
- National team: Canada
- Born: January 3, 1983 (age 43) London, Ontario
- Height: 1.90 m (6 ft 3 in)
- Weight: 98 kg (216 lb)

Sport
- Sport: Swimming
- Strokes: Butterfly
- Club: London Aquatic Club
- College team: University of Nevada, Las Vegas
Medal record
Men's swimming
Representing Canada
Pan American Games
Bronze medal – third place	2007 Rio de Janeiro	4x100 m medley

Joseph Bartoch (born January 3, 1983) is a former competition swimmer from Canada, who specialized in the butterfly events. He claimed a bronze medal as a member of the third-place Canadian team in the 4x100-metre medley relay at the 2007 Pan American Games in Rio de Janeiro, Brazil. He competed at the 2008 Summer Olympics in Beijing in the 100-metre butterfly and the 4x100-metre medley relay, and in the same events at the 2012 Summer Olympics in London.

== See also ==
- World record progression 4 × 100 metres medley relay
