= Chang Gyu-cheol =

South Korean swimmer (born 1992)

Personal information
- Nationality: South Korea
- Born: 11 June 1992 (age 34) Gyeonggi-do, South Korea
- Height: 1.83 m (6 ft 0 in)
- Weight: 83 kg (183 lb)

Korean name
- Hangul: 장규철
- RR: Jang Gyucheol
- MR: Chang Kyuch'ŏl

Sport
- Sport: Swimming
- Strokes: Butterfly
- Club: Gyeonggi High School
Medal record
Men's swimming
Representing South Korea
Youth Olympic Games
Gold medal – first place	2010 Singapore	100 m butterfly
Silver medal – second place	2010 Singapore	50 m butterfly
Asian Games
Silver medal – second place	2010 Guangzhou	4×100 m medley

Chang Gyu-cheol (Korean: 장규철; born June 11, 1992, in Gyeonggi-do) is a South Korean swimmer, who specialized in butterfly events. In 2010, Chang edged out South Africa's Chad le Clos by 0.18 of a second to claim a gold medal in the 100 m butterfly at the first ever Summer Youth Olympics in Singapore, posting his personal best of 53.13. He also won a silver medal, as a member of the South Korean swimming team, in the men's medley relay at the 2010 Asian Games in Guangzhou, China.

Chang qualified for the men's 100 m butterfly at the 2012 Summer Olympics in London, by eclipsing a FINA B-standard entry time of 52.45 seconds. He challenged seven other swimmers on the third heat, including five-time Olympian Peter Mankoč of Slovenia, freestyle relay champion Clement Lefert of France, and former Olympic finalist Ryan Pini of Papua New Guinea. Chang raced to fifth place by a hundredth of a second (0.01) behind Pini in a time of 52.69 seconds. Chang failed to advance into the semifinals, as he placed twenty-sixth overall in the preliminary heats.
