= Zhou Jiawei =

Chinese swimmer (born 1983)

Personal information
- Full name: Zhou Jiawei
- Nationality: China
- Born: 23 August 1983 (age 42) Guangdong
- Height: 187 cm (6 ft 2 in)
- Weight: 83 kg (183 lb)

Sport
- Sport: Swimming
- Strokes: Butterfly
Medal record
Asian Games
Gold medal – first place	2010 Guangzhou	50m fly
Gold medal – first place	2010 Guangzhou	100m fly

Zhou Jiawei (born 23 August 1983) is a national-record-holding swimmer from China. He set the Asian Record in the long-course 50m butterfly (23.43) at the 2009 Chinese Nationals; and set the Chinese Record also in the long-course 100 butterfly (51.24) at the 2009 Chinese National Games.

Born in Guangdong, Zhou has swum for China at the:

- Asian Games: 2006, 2010
- World Championships: 2007, 2009
- 2009 Asian Swimming Championships

At the 2006 Asian Games, he finished 4th place in the 100 butterfly (53.24). At the 2010 Asian Games, he won both the 50 and 100 butterfly events.

== See also ==
- China at the 2012 Summer Olympics - Swimming
