= Lü Zhiwu =

Chinese swimmer (born 1989)

Personal information
- Born: March 18, 1989 (age 37) Wenzhou, Zhejiang, China
Medal record
Men's swimming
Representing China
Olympic Games
Bronze medal – third place	2012 London	4x200 m freestyle
World Championships (LC)
Bronze medal – third place	2013 Barcelona	4×200 m freestyle
Asian Games
Gold medal – first place	2010 Guangzhou	50 m freestyle
Gold medal – first place	2010 Guangzhou	4×100 m freestyle
Silver medal – second place	2010 Guangzhou	100 m freestyle

Lü Zhiwu, more commonly spelled "Lv Zhiwu", (born March 18, 1989, in Wenzhou, Zhejiang) is a Chinese swimmer, who competed for Team China at the 2008 Summer Olympics and 2012 Summer Olympics. At the 2012 Summer Olympics, he was part of the Chinese 4 x 200 m team that won bronze.

== Major achievements ==
- 2005 National Games – 8th 100 m freestyle;
- 2007 National Intercity Games – 1st 100 m free, 2nd 50 m freestyle ;
- 2008 National Champions Tournament – 3rd 50 m freestyle
- 2012 Olympics - 3rd 4 x 200 m freestyle

== Records ==
- 2008 National Champions Tournament – 3:17.07, 4 × 100 m free (AR)

== See also ==
- China at the 2012 Summer Olympics – Swimming

Records
Preceded by (Japan) Takuro Fujii	Men's 100-metre freestyle Asian record-holder (long course); 5 September 2013 – 8 September 2013	Succeeded by (China) Ning Zetao
