= Hsu Chi-chieh =

Taiwanese swimmer (born 1988)

Personal information
- Nationality: Chinese Taipei
- Born: 27 April 1988 (age 38) San Francisco, California, USA
- Height: 1.77 m (5 ft 10 in) (2012)
- Weight: 72 kg (159 lb) (2012)

Sport
- Sport: Swimming
- Strokes: Butterfly
- Coach: Tony Hsu

Hsu Chi-chieh
- Traditional Chinese: 許志傑
- Hanyu Pinyin: Xǔ Zhìjié

Hsu Chi-chieh (born 27 April 1988 in San Francisco) is a Taiwanese swimmer.

Hsu represented Chinese Taipei at the Summer Olympics in 2008 and 2012. In 2008, he competed in the men's 200 metre butterfly. He won his heat, finished in 16th place overall in the heats, and qualified for the semifinals. In his semifinal, he finished 8th and failed to qualify for the final. In 2012, he again competed in the men's 200 metre butterfly. He finished in 30th place overall in the heats, failing to qualify for the semifinals.

Hsu is the son of Taiwanese Olympic swimmer Hsu Tung-hsiung. He married his middle-school classmate Chen Chun-hung in January 2016.
