= Takuro Fujii =

Japanese swimmer (born 1985)

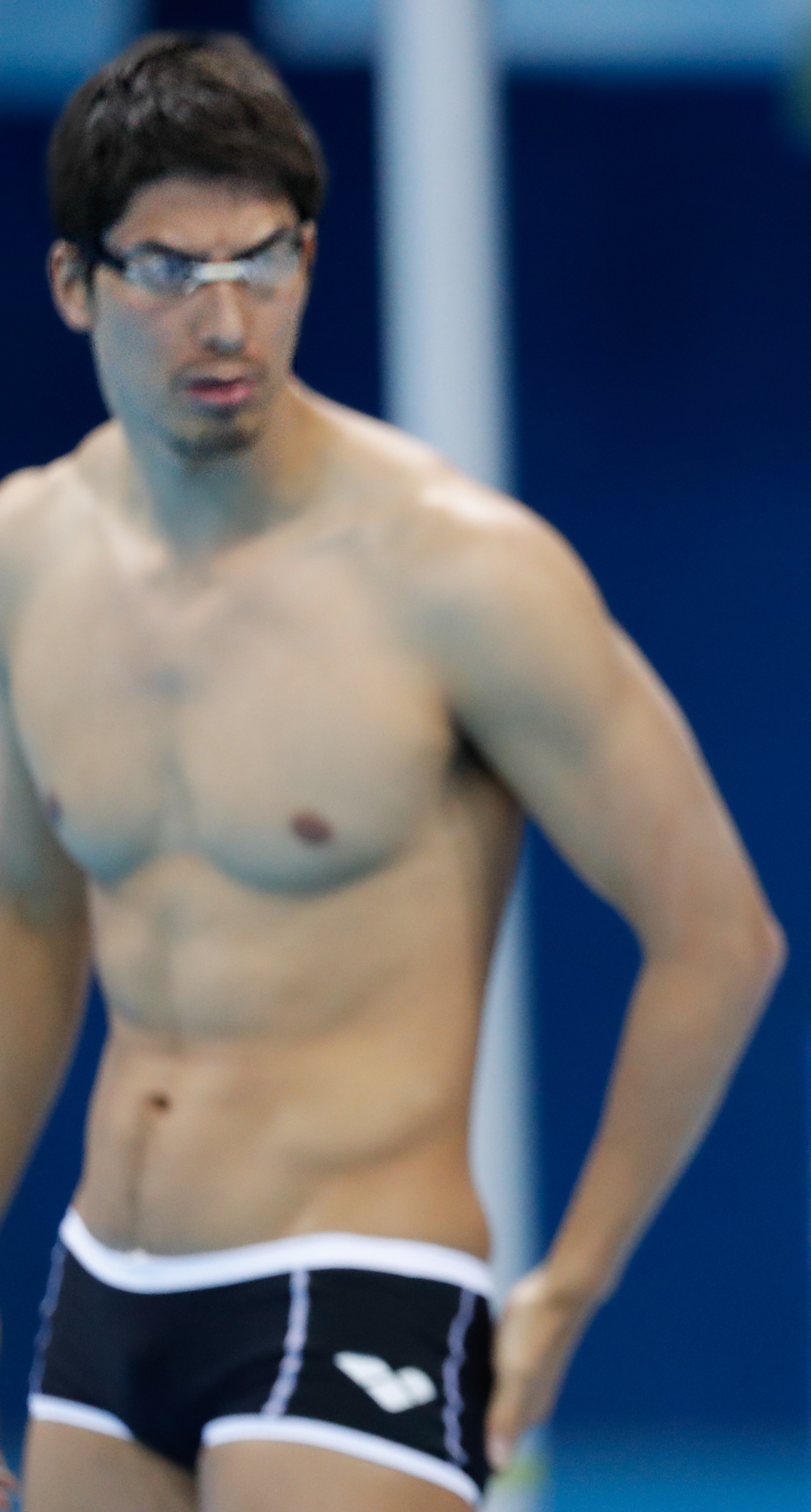
- Fujii at the 2016 Olympics

Personal information
- Full name: Takuro Fujii
- National team: Japan
- Born: April 21, 1985 (age 41) Kawachinagano, Japan
- Height: 1.84 m (6 ft 0 in)
- Weight: 75 kg (165 lb)

Sport
- Sport: Swimming
- Strokes: Butterfly, freestyle
Medal record
Representing Japan
Men's swimming
Event	1st	2nd	3rd
Olympic Games	0	1	1
World Championships (LC)	0	0	1
Olympic Games
Bronze medal – third place	2008 Beijing	4×100 m medley
Silver medal – second place	2012 London	4×100 m medley
World Championships (LC)
Bronze medal – third place	2013 Barcelona	4×100 m medley
Pan Pacific Championships
Silver medal – second place	2010 Irvine	4x100 m medley
Bronze medal – third place	2010 Irvine	100 m butterfly
Asian Games
Bronze medal – third place	2010 Guangzhou	100 m freestyle

Takuro Fujii (藤井 拓郎, Fujii Takurō; born April 21, 1985) is a Japanese competitive swimmer and two-time Olympic medalist. He won the bronze medal by swimming the butterfly leg in the 4 × 100 m medley relay at the 2008 Summer Olympics. He followed this with a silver medal at the 2012 Summer Olympics, again in the medley relay, but this time by swimming the freestyle (anchor) leg.

== Personal bests ==
In long course

- 100 m freestyle: 48.73 Asian, Japanese Record (April 16, 2009)
- 100 m butterfly: 51.28 Asian, Japanese Record (February 1, 2009)

In short course

- 100 m freestyle: 46.85 Asian, Japanese Record (March 8, 2009)

Records
Preceded by (China) Chen Zuo	Men's 100-metre freestyle Asian record-holder (long course); 16 April 2009 – 5 September 2013	Succeeded by (China) Lü Zhiwu
