= 2010 NCAA Division I Men's Swimming and Diving Championships =

American college aquatic sports competition

2010 NCAA Division I Swimming and Diving Championships
- Host city: Columbus, Ohio
- Date: March 26–28, 2010
- Venue(s): McCorkle Aquatic Pavilion; Ohio State University

The 2010 NCAA Division I Men's Swimming and Diving Championships were contested from March 26–28, 2010 at the McCorkle Aquatic Pavilion at Ohio State University in Columbus, Ohio at the 87th annual NCAA-sanctioned swim meet to determine the team and individual national champions of Division I men's collegiate swimming and diving in the United States.

Texas topped the team standings, finishing 30.5 points ahead of California. It was the Longhorns' tenth overall men's team title.

== Team standings ==
- Note: Top 10 only
- (H) = Hosts
- ^{(DC)} = Defending champions
- Full results

Rank	Team	Points
1st place, gold medalist(s)	Texas	500
2nd place, silver medalist(s)	California	469 1/2
3rd place, bronze medalist(s)	Arizona	387
4	Stanford	369
5	Florida	364
6	Auburn ^{(DC)}	277 1/2
7	Michigan	204
8	Georgia	143
9	Ohio State (H)	136 1/2
10	Virginia	123

== Swimming results ==
Event	Gold		Silver		Bronze	
50 freestyle	Josh Schneider; Cincinnati	18.93	Nathan Adrian; California	19.02	Adam Brown; Auburn	19.03
100 freestyle	Nathan Adrian; California	41.50	Jimmy Feigen; Texas	41.91	Gideon Louw; Auburn	42.06
200 freestyle	Conor Dwyer; Florida	1:32.31	Shaune Fraser; Florida	1:32.53	David Walters; Texas	1:33.04
500 freestyle	Conor Dwyer; Florida	4:13.64	Jean Basson; Arizona	4:13.65	Clement Lefert; USC	4:13.77
1650 freestyle	Chad La Tourette; Stanford	14:42.87	Martin Grodzki; Georgia	14:48.15	Jackson Wilcox; Texas	14:49.47
100 backstroke	Eugene Godsoe; California	45.11	Jake Tapp; Arizona	46.16	Guy Barnea; California	46.23
200 backstroke	Cory Chitwood; Arizona	1:39.29	Tyler Clary; Michigan	1:39.89	Eugene Godsoe; Stanford	1:40.07
100 breaststroke	Damir Dugonjič; California	51.65	Scott Spann; Texas	52.22	Martti Aljand; California	52.32
200 breaststroke	Clark Burckle; Arizona	1:53.19	Scott Spann; Texas	1:53.21	George Klein; Auburn	1:53.34
100 butterfly	Tom Shields; California	44.91	Mathias Gydesen; California	45.83	Eugene Godsoe; Stanford	45.96
200 butterfly	Shaune Fraser; Florida	1:41.45	Tom Shields; California	1:41.52	Bobby Bollier; Stanford	1:41.54
200 IM	Austin Surhoff; Texas	1:42.95	Shaune Fraser; Florida	1:42.99	Martin Liivamägi; California	1:43.05
400 IM	Tyler Clary; Michigan	3:38.89	Gal Nevo; Georgia Tech	3:40.68	Billy Cregar; Georgia	3:41.08
200 freestyle relay	California; Nathan Adrian (18.99); Graeme Moore (19.00); Josh Daniels (18.63); Guy Barnea (19.09)	1:15.71	Auburn; Adam Brown (19.35); Tyler McGill (19.01); Gideon Louw (19.16); Michael Silva (18.49)	1:16.23	Texas; Jimmy Feigen (19.11); David Walters (19.16); Ben Vanroekel (18.76); Scott Jostes (19.20)	1:16.64
400 freestyle relay	California; Graeme Moore (43.31); Josh Daniels (42.01); Tom Shields (42.48); Nathan Adrian (40.98)	2:48.78	Texas; David Walters (42.33); Jimmy Feigen (42.01); Scott Jostes (42.35); Ricky Berens (43.21)	2:51.27	Stanford; Alex Coville (43.64); Eugene Godsoe (42.92); Jakob Allen (43.11); David Dunford (41.60)	2:51.36
800 freestyle relay	Texas; Scott Jostes (1:33.25); David Walters (1:32.76); Neil Caskey (1:33.86); Ricky Berens (1:32.90)	6:12.77	Florida; Shaune Fraser (1:33.76); Brett Fraser (1:33.14); Jeffrey Raymond (1:35.24); Conor Dwyer (1:32.58)	6:18.33	Arizona; Jean Basson (1:34.06); Nimrod Shapira Bar-Or (1:34.32); Jack Brown (1:34.01); Joel Greenshields (1:35.94)	6:18.99
200 medley relay	California; Guy Barnea (21.30); Damir Dugonjič (23.10); Graeme Moore (20.01); Josh Daniels (18.67)	1:23.08	Auburn; Jared White (21.31); George Klein (23.71); Tyler McGill (20.81); Gideon Louw (18.30)	1:24.13	Texas; Cole Cragin (21.63); Scott Spann (23.60); Hill Taylor (20.64); Jimmy Feigen (18.76)	1:24.63
400 medley relay	California; Guy Barnea (46.49); Damir Dugonjič (50.91); Tom Shields (44.54); Nathan Adrian (40.89)	3:02.83	Auburn; Pascal Wollach (46.20); George Klein (51.99); Tyler McGill (45.39); Gideon Louw (41.66)	3:05.24	Stanford; Eugene Godsoe (44.93); Curtis Lovelace (52.06); Bobby Bollier (46.88); Rob Andrews (41.54)	3:05.41

== Diving results ==
Event	Gold		Silver		Bronze	
1 m diving	David Boudia; Purdue	468.65; MR	Terry Horner; Florida State	432.45	Drew Livingston; Texas	413.10
3 m diving	David Boudia; Purdue	494.90; MR	Nick McCrory; Duke	459.15	Grant Nel; Texas A&M	450.50
Platform diving	Nick McCrory; Duke	534.00; MR	Riley McCormick; Arizona State	469.50	Matthew Cooper; Texas	462.30

Legend: MR – Meet record;

== See also ==
- List of college swimming and diving teams
