= 2010 Pan Pacific Swimming Championships – Men's 100 metre freestyle =

Men's 100 metre freestyle at the 2010 Pan Pacific Swimming Championships
- Venue: William Woollett Jr. Aquatics Center
- Dates: August 19, 2010 (heats & finals)
- Competitors: 56 from 15 nations
- Winning time: 48.15

Medalists
gold medal	Nathan Adrian	United States
silver medal	Brent Hayden	Canada
bronze medal	César Cielo	Brazil

The men's 100 metre freestyle competition at the 2010 Pan Pacific Swimming Championships took place on August 19 at the William Woollett Jr. Aquatics Center. The last champion was Brent Hayden of Canada.

This race consisted of two lengths of the pool, both lengths being in freestyle.

== Records ==
Prior to this competition, the existing world and Pan Pacific records were as follows:

World record	César Cielo Filho (BRA)	46.91	Rome, Italy	July 30, 2009
Pan Pacific Championships record	Brent Hayden (CAN)	48.59	Victoria, Canada	August 18, 2006

== Results ==
All times are in minutes and seconds.

KEY:	q	Fastest non-qualifiers	Q	Qualified	CR	Championships record	NR	National record	PB	Personal best	SB	Seasonal best

=== Heats ===
The first round was held on August 19, at 10:16.

Rank	Heat	Lane	Name	Nationality	Time	Notes
1	7	5	Nathan Adrian	United States	48.41	QA, CR
2	8	7	Jason Lezak	United States	48.47	QA
3	6	6	Brent Hayden	Canada	48.50	QA
4	7	8	Kyle Richardson	Australia	48.69	QA
5	8	6	Eamon Sullivan	Australia	48.92	QA
6	6	1	James Magnussen	Australia	48.95	QB
7	6	4	Garrett Weber-Gale	United States	48.98	QB
8	5	5	Graeme Moore	South Africa	48.99	QA
9	8	2	Cameron Prosser	Australia	49.02	
10	7	4	Lyndon Ferns	South Africa	49.09	QA
11	8	4	César Cielo	Brazil	49.13	QA
12	8	5	Nicolas Oliveira	Brazil	49.20	QB
13	6	5	Gideon Louw	South Africa	49.26	QB
14	8	3	Tommaso D'Orsogna	Australia	49.36	
15	4	3	Nicholas Ffrost	Australia	49.42	
16	4	6	Kenrick Monk	Australia	49.53	
17	6	3	Takuro Fujii	Japan	49.63	QB
18	4	5	Ricky Berens	United States	49.64	
19	6	7	Henrique Rodrigues	Brazil	49.70	QB
20	3	1	Mitchell Patterson	Australia	49.95	
21	4	2	Sho Uchida	Japan	50.00	QB
22	7	6	Brett Fraser	Cayman Islands	50.02	QB
23	5	1	Rammaru Harada	Japan	50.06	
24	6	8	Cullen Jones	United States	50.14	
25	7	7	Bruno Fratus	Brazil	50.16	
26	5	3	Andrew Lauterstein	Australia	50.18	
27	3	4	George Bovell	Trinidad and Tobago	50.20	
28	4	8	Peter Vanderkaay	United States	50.22	
29	4	4	Shunsuke Kuzuhara	Japan	50.23	
30	3	8	Richard Hortness	Canada	50.25	
31	3	2	Carl O'Donnell	New Zealand	50.28	
32	3	6	Ryan Pini	Papua New Guinea	50.29	
33	7	3	Shaune Fraser	Cayman Islands	50.43	
34	2	3	Timothy Phillips	United States	50.45	
35	6	2	Nicholas Santos	Brazil	50.46	
36	5	4	Yuki Kobori	Japan	50.49	
37	5	7	Makoto Ito	Japan	50.50	
38	5	6	Yoshihiro Okumura	Japan	50.52	
39	3	5	Leith Brodie	Australia	50.53	
40	2	6	Luke Peddie	Canada	50.61	
41	8	1	Rodrigo Castro	Brazil	50.68	
42	3	7	Gláuber Silva	Brazil	50.77	
42	4	1	Hassaan Khalik	Canada	50.77	
44	5	2	Federico Grabich	Argentina	50.79	
45	3	3	Joaquin Belza	Argentina	50.86	
46	1	3	Park Seon-Kwan	South Korea	50.90	
47	2	2	Chris Wright	Australia	50.92	
48	1	4	Joonmo Bae	South Korea	50.97	
49	7	1	Fernando Silva	Brazil	51.00	
50	2	5	Blake Worsley	Canada	51.07	
50	7	2	Roland Schoeman	South Africa	51.07	
52	4	7	Minkyu Park	South Korea	51.24	
53	2	4	Sebastian Jahnsen	Peru	52.10	
54	2	7	Nicholas Tan	Singapore	52.12	
55	2	1	Chun Yin Kong	Hong Kong	52.89	
56	1	5	Ho Chun Yan	Hong Kong	52.89	
-	5	8	Masayuki Kishida	Japan	DNS	
-	8	8	Colin Russell	Canada	DNS	

=== B Final ===
The B final was held on August 19, at 18:16.

Rank	Lane	Name	Nationality	Time	Notes
9	5	Garrett Weber-Gale	United States	48.73	
10	4	James Magnussen	Australia	48.94	
11	6	Gideon Louw	South Africa	49.13	
12	3	Nicolas Oliveira	Brazil	49.36	
13	2	Takuro Fujii	Japan	49.90	
14	7	Henrique Rodrigues	Brazil	49.91	
15	1	Sho Uchida	Japan	49.98	
16	8	Brett Fraser	Cayman Islands	50.29	

=== A Final ===
The A final was held on August 19, at 18:16.

Rank	Lane	Name	Nationality	Time	Notes
1st place, gold medalist(s)	4	Nathan Adrian	United States	48.15	CR
2nd place, silver medalist(s)	3	Brent Hayden	Canada	48.19	
3rd place, bronze medalist(s)	8	César Cielo	Brazil	48.48	
4	5	Jason Lezak	United States	48.57	
5	7	Graeme Moore	South Africa	48.76	
6	6	Kyle Richardson	Australia	48.81	
7	2	Eamon Sullivan	Australia	48.84	
8	1	Lyndon Ferns	South Africa	49.46	
