= 2011 NCAA Division I Men's Swimming and Diving Championships =

American college aquatic sports competition

2011 NCAA Division I Swimming and Diving Championships
- Host city: Minneapolis, Minnesota
- Date: March 2011
- Venue(s): University Aquatic Center; University of Minnesota

The 2011 NCAA Division I Men's Swimming and Diving Championships were contested in March 2011 at the University Aquatic Center at the University of Minnesota in Minneapolis, Minnesota at the 88th annual NCAA-sanctioned swim meet to determine the team and individual national champions of Division I men's collegiate swimming and diving in the United States.

California topped the team standings, finishing 23.5 points ahead of defending champions Texas. It was the Golden Bears' third overall national title and first since 1980.

== Team standings ==
- Note: Top 10 only
- (H) = Hosts
- ^{(DC)} = Defending champions
- Full results

Rank	Team	Points
1st place, gold medalist(s)	California	493
2nd place, silver medalist(s)	Texas ^{(DC)}	470 1/2
3rd place, bronze medalist(s)	Stanford	403
4	Arizona	302
5	Florida	291
6	Auburn	269 1/2
7	USC	206
8	Virginia	200
9	Michigan	181
10	Georgia	125 1/2
15	Minnesota (H)	91

== Swimming results ==
Event	Gold		Silver		Bronze	
50 freestyle	Nathan Adrian; California	18.66; AR	Adam Brown; Auburn	18.72	Jimmy Feigen; Texas	18.97
100 freestyle	Nathan Adrian; California	41.10	Jimmy Feigen; Texas	41.66	Adam Brown; Auburn	41.84
200 freestyle	Brett Fraser; Florida	1:32.56	Dax Hill; Texas	1:32.85	Clement Lefert; USC	1:32.93
500 freestyle	Matt McLean; Virginia	4:10.15	Bobby Bollier; Stanford	4:13.94	Conor Dwyer; Florida	4:13.98
1650 freestyle	Michael McBroom; Texas	14:32.86	Martin Grodzki; Georgia Chad La Tourette; Stanford	14:34.80	None awarded	
100 backstroke	Tom Shields; California	45.02	Eric Ress; Indiana	45.14	Cole Cragin; Texas	45.56
200 backstroke	Cory Chitwood; Arizona	1:38.84	Eric Ress; Indiana	1:38.96	Marco Loughran; Florida	1:40.95
100 breaststroke	Damir Dugonjič; California	50.94	Nolan Koon; California	51.63	Carlos Almeida; Louisville	52.02
200 breaststroke	Eric Friedland; Texas	1:52.43	Martti Aljand; California	1:52.88	Nick D'innocenzo; Texas	1:53.13
100 butterfly	Austin Staab; Stanford	44.69	Tom Shields; California	44.91	Dan Madwed; Michigan	45.57
200 butterfly	Mark Dylla; Georgia	1:40.60; MR	Bobby Bollier; Stanford	1:40.76	Tom Shields; California	1:41.20
200 IM	Austin Staab; Stanford	1:41.57	Cory Chitwood; Arizona	1:42.28	Bill Cregar; Georgia	1:43.56
400 IM	Bill Cregar; Georgia	3:40.97	Kyle Whitaker; Michigan	3:41.69	Tyler Harris; UNC	3:42.49
200 freestyle relay	Stanford; Alex Coville (19.17); Austin Staab (18.55); Jakob Allen (18.78); Aaron Wayne (18.76)	1:15.26; AR	California; Nathan Adrian (18.74); Graeme Moore (18.97); Josh Daniels (18.93); Tom Shields (18.70)	1:15.34	Auburn; Adam Brown (18.86); Kohlton Norys (19.10); Karl Krug (19.01); Marcelo Chierighini (18.61)	1:15.58
400 freestyle relay	California; Graeme Moore (42.11); Josh Daniels (42.78); Tom Shields (41.78); Nathan Adrian (40.71)	2:50.32	Auburn; Adam Brown (41.97); Marcelo Chierighini (42.51); Karl Krug (42.86); Kohlton Norys (42.13)	2:50.47	USC; Vladimir Morozov (41.97); Clement Lefert (42.67); Jeffery Daniels (43.43); Dimitri Colupaev (42.25)	2:50.83
800 freestyle relay	Florida; Conor Dwyer (1:33.79); Brett Fraser (1:33.48); Sebastien Rousseau (1:33.28); Jeffrey Raymond (1:34.33)	6:14.88	Virginia; Matt McLean (1:33.70); Peter Geissinger (1:35.02); David Karasek (1:35.29); Scott Robison (1:32.58)	6:16.59	USC; Clement Lefert (1:33.12); John Wagner (1:35.87); Dimitri Colupaev (1:33.16); James White (1:35.43)	6:17.58
200 medley relay	California; Guy Barnea (21.37); Damir Dugonjič (23.08); Graeme Moore (20.54); Nathan Adrian (18.13)	1:23.12	Texas; Cole Cragin (21.00); Scott Spann (23.80); Woody Joye (20.68); Jimmy Feigen (18.65)	1:24.13	Auburn; Kyle Owens (21.09); Adam Klein (24.00); Adam Brown (20.47); Marcelo Chierighini (19.00)	1:24.56
400 medley relay	California; Guy Barnea (46.07); Damir Dugonjič (50.73); Tom Shields (44.35); Nathan Adrian (41.13)	3:02.28	Texas; Cole Cragin (45.92); Scott Spann (51.72); Neil Caskey (46.68); Jimmy Feigen (41.78)	3:06.10	Stanford; Matthew Swanston (46.95); John Criste (52.46); Austin Staab (45.04); Alex Coville (42.07)	3:06.52

Legend: MR – Meet record; AR – American record;

== Diving results ==
Event	Gold		Silver		Bronze	
1 m diving	David Boudia; Purdue	461.00	Grant Nel; Texas A&M	425.86	Drew Livingston; Texas	413.20
3 m diving	David Boudia; Purdue	472.30	Grant Nel; Texas A&M	471.35	Constantin Blaha; Arizona State	450.40
Platform diving	Nick McCrory; Duke	548.90	David Boudia; Purdue	479.10	Grant Nel; Texas A&M	452.35

== See also ==
- List of college swimming and diving teams
