= 2010 Pan Pacific Swimming Championships – Men's 50 metre freestyle =

Men's 50 metre freestyle at the 2010 Pan Pacific Swimming Championships
- Venue: William Woollett Jr. Aquatics Center
- Dates: August 21, 2010 (heats & finals)
- Competitors: 49 from 15 nations
- Winning time: 21.55

Medalists
gold medal	Nathan Adrian	United States
silver medal	César Cielo	Brazil
bronze medal	Brent Hayden	Canada

The men's 50 metre freestyle competition at the 2010 Pan Pacific Swimming Championships took place on August 21 at the William Woollett Jr. Aquatics Center. The last champion was Cullen Jones of US.

This race consisted of one length of the pool in freestyle.

== Records ==
Prior to this competition, the existing world and Pan Pacific records were as follows:

World record	César Cielo Filho (BRA)	20.91	São Paulo, Brazil	December 18, 2009
Pan Pacific Championships record	Cullen Jones (USA)	21.84	Victoria, Canada	August 20, 2006

== Results ==
All times are in minutes and seconds.

KEY:	q	Fastest non-qualifiers	Q	Qualified	CR	Championships record	NR	National record	PB	Personal best	SB	Seasonal best

=== Heats ===
The first round was held on August 21, at 10:39.

Rank	Heat	Lane	Name	Nationality	Time	Notes
1	7	4	César Cielo	Brazil	21.64	QA, CR
2	7	5	Nathan Adrian	United States	21.85	QA
3	5	7	Brent Hayden	Canada	22.04	QA
4	6	3	Gideon Louw	South Africa	22.14	QA
5	6	6	Cullen Jones	United States	22.15	QA
6	7	3	Bruno Fratus	Brazil	22.16	QA
7	5	4	Ashley Callus	Australia	22.18	QA
8	6	8	Jason Lezak	United States	22.27	WD
9	6	5	Garrett Weber-Gale	United States	22.29	QB
10	5	2	Cameron Prosser	Australia	22.36	QA
11	5	6	Masayuki Kishida	Japan	22.41	QB
12	7	6	Eamon Sullivan	Australia	22.43	QB
13	7	2	Kyle Richardson	Australia	22.44	
14	5	3	Lyndon Ferns	South Africa	22.55	QB
15	4	5	Graeme Moore	South Africa	22.56	QB
15	6	2	George Bovell	Trinidad and Tobago	22.56	QB
15	7	8	Rammaru Harada	Japan	22.56	QB
18	5	8	Tyler McGill	United States	22.66	
19	5	5	Nicholas Santos	Brazil	22.73	QB
19	6	7	Makoto Ito	Japan	22.73	
21	6	4	Roland Schoeman	South Africa	22.74	
22	4	6	James Magnussen	Australia	22.75	
23	7	1	Minkyu Park	South Korea	23.01	
24	4	3	Luke Peddie	Canada	23.02	
25	7	7	Fernando Silva	Brazil	23.08	
26	3	8	Kenrick Monk	Australia	23.09	
27	2	5	Colin Russell	Canada	23.16	
28	4	4	Brett Fraser	Cayman Islands	23.20	
29	1	4	Nicholas Ffrost	Australia	23.24	
29	3	5	Mitchell Patterson	Australia	23.24	
31	3	3	Richard Hortness	Canada	23.30	
32	1	5	Timothy Phillips	United States	23.31	
33	5	1	Federico Grabich	Argentina	23.33	
34	3	4	Joaquin Belza	Argentina	23.34	
35	3	7	Carl O'Donnell	New Zealand	23.37	
36	6	1	Daniel Coakley	Philippines	23.42	
37	3	1	Shaune Fraser	Cayman Islands	23.57	
38	3	2	Masafumi Yamaguchi	Japan	23.63	
39	2	3	Hassaan Khalik	Canada	23.69	
40	4	1	Gláuber Silva	Brazil	23.70	
41	2	2	Jeong Doo-Hee	South Korea	23.75	
41	4	2	Park Seon-Kwan	South Korea	23.75	
43	2	4	Ben Treffers	Australia	23.79	
44	3	6	Rodrigo Castro	Brazil	23.82	
45	2	7	Blake Worsley	Canada	23.88	
46	4	8	Ryan Pini	Papua New Guinea	23.90	
47	2	6	Chun Yin Kong	Hong Kong	24.07	
48	4	7	Ho Chun Yan	Hong Kong	24.08	
49	1	3	Timothy Ferris	Zimbabwe	24.43	

=== B Final ===
The B final was held on August 21, at 19:03.

Rank	Lane	Name	Nationality	Time	Notes
9	4	Garrett Weber-Gale	United States	22.24	
10	5	Masayuki Kishida	Japan	22.43	
11	3	Eamon Sullivan	Australia	22.50	
12	2	Rammaru Harada	Japan	22.53	
13	8	Nicholas Santos	Brazil	22.55	
14	1	Graeme Moore	South Africa	22.56	
15	7	George Bovell	Trinidad and Tobago	22.68	
16	6	Lyndon Ferns	South Africa	22.82	

=== A Final ===
The A final was held on August 21, at 19:03.

Rank	Lane	Name	Nationality	Time	Notes
1st place, gold medalist(s)	5	Nathan Adrian	United States	21.55	CR
2nd place, silver medalist(s)	4	César Cielo	Brazil	21.57	
3rd place, bronze medalist(s)	3	Brent Hayden	Canada	21.89	
4	7	Bruno Fratus	Brazil	21.93	
5	6	Gideon Louw	South Africa	22.08	
6	2	Cullen Jones	United States	22.10	
7	1	Ashley Callus	Australia	22.15	
8	8	Cameron Prosser	Australia	22.41	
