= 2009 NCAA Division I Men's Swimming and Diving Championships =

American college aquatic sports competition

2009 NCAA Division I Swimming and Diving Championships
- Host city: College Station, Texas
- Date: March 26–28, 2009
- Venue(s): Student Recreation Center Natatorium; Texas A&M University

The 2009 NCAA Division I Men's Swimming and Diving Championships were contested from March 26–28, 2009 at the Student Recreation Center Natatorium at Texas A&M University in College Station, Texas at the 86th annual NCAA-sanctioned swim meet to determine the team and individual national champions of Division I men's collegiate swimming and diving in the United States.

== Team standings ==
- Note: Top 10 only
- (H) = Hosts
- ^{(DC)} = Defending champions
- Full results

Rank	Team	Points
1st place, gold medalist(s)	Auburn ^{(DC)}	562
2nd place, silver medalist(s)	Texas	487
3rd place, bronze medalist(s)	Stanford	460 1/2
4	California	350
5	Florida	324
6	Arizona	309
7	Michigan	248
8	Tennessee	144
9	Virginia	133
10	Georgia	131
12	Texas A&M (H)	104

== Swimming results ==
Event	Gold		Silver		Bronze	
50 freestyle	Nathan Adrian; California	18.71; AR	Jimmy Feigen; Texas	18.84	Matt Targett; Auburn	18.87
100 freestyle	Nathan Adrian; California	41.08; AR	Jimmy Feigen; Texas	41.49	Matt Targett; Auburn	41.64
200 freestyle	Shaune Fraser; Florida	1:31.70	David Walters; Texas	1:32.59	Ricky Berens; Texas	1:32.74
500 freestyle	Jean Basson; Arizona	4:08.92	Michael Klueh; Texas	4:09.32	Matt McLean; Virginia	4:10.41
1650 freestyle	Troy Prinsloo; Georgia	14:30.91	Chad La Tourette; Stanford	14:33.55	Scott Spansail; Washington	14:34.95
100 backstroke	Kohlton Norys; Auburn	45.26	David Russell; California	45.30	Hill Taylor; Texas	43.85
200 backstroke	Tyler Clary; Michigan	1:37.58; NC	Jake Tapp; Arizona	1:38.67	Omar Pinzon; Florida	1:39.50
100 breaststroke	Damir Dugonjič; California	50.86; US	Adam Klein; Auburn	51.80	John Criste; Stanford	51.89
200 breaststroke	Neil Versfeld; Georgia	1:51.40; US	Sean Mahoney; California	1:52.34	Paul Kornfeld; Stanford	1:52.55
100 butterfly	Austin Staab; Stanford	44.18; US, AR	Tyler McGill; Auburn	44.63	Logan Madson; Auburn	44.99
200 butterfly	Shaune Fraser; Florida	1:40.75; NC	Mark Dylla; Georgia	1:40.85	Logan Madson; Auburn	1:41.70
200 IM	Bradley Ally; Florida	1:40.49; NC	Tyler Clary; Michigan	1:41.67	Ricky Berens; Texas	1:41.92
400 IM	Tyler Clary; Michigan	3:35.98; US, AR	Gal Nevo; Georgia Tech	3:38.00	Bradley Ally; Florida	3:38.20
200 freestyle relay	Auburn; Jakob Andkjær (18.89); Gideon Louw (18.33); Kohlton Norys (18.67); Matt Targett (18.19)	1:14.08; US	Stanford; Alex Coville (18.97); Austin Staab (18.28); Jason Dunford (18.45); David Dunford (18.52)	1:14.22	California; Nathan Adrian (18.76) AR; Graeme Moore (18.89); Josh Daniels (18.87); Bennett Clark (18.61)	1:15.13
400 freestyle relay	Auburn; Jakob Andkjær (42.36); Matt Targett (40.95); Kohlton Norys (41.54); Tyler McGill (41.82)	2:46.67	Texas; Jimmy Feigen (41.94); Ricky Berens (41.83); Peter Jameson (42.15); David Walters (41.10)	2:47.02; AR	California; Nathan Adrian (41.27); Graeme Moore (42.52); Josh Daniels (42.60); Bennett Clark (41.22)	2:47.61
800 freestyle relay	Texas; David Walters (1:31.72); Ricky Berens (1:32.15); Scott Jostes (1:33.20); Michael Klueh (1:33.09)	6:10.16; US, AR	Arizona; Jean Basson (1:32.48); Nicolas Oliveira (1:32.84); Nimrod Shapira Bar-Or (1:33.51); Joel Greenshields (1:32.99)	6:11.82	Stanford; Austin Staab (1:32.99); Bobby Bollier (1:34.35); Jake Allen (1:34.72); Rob Andrews (1:34.65)	6:16.71
200 medley relay	Auburn; Jared White (20.97); Michael Silva (23.36); Matt Targett (19.66); Gideon Louw (18.37)	1:22.36; US	California; Guy Barnea (21.22); Damir Dugonjič (22.96); Graeme Moore (20.09); Nathan Adrian (18.23)	1:22.50	Stanford; Eugene Godsoe (21.03); John Criste (23.75); Jason Dunford (19.81); Alex Coville (18.55)	1:23.14
400 medley relay	Auburn; Pascal Wollach (45.32); Adam Klein (51.01); Tyler McGill (43.99); Matt Targett (41.07)	3:01.39; US	California; David Russell (45.76); Damir Dugonjič (50.58); Graeme Moore (45.12); Nathan Adrian (40.23)	3:01.69	Stanford; Eugene Godsoe (45.29); Paul Kornfield (51.29); Austin Staab (43.55); Alex Coville (41.58)	3:01.91

Legend: US – U.S. Open record; NC – NCAA record; MR – Meet record; AR – American record;

== Diving results ==
Event	Gold		Silver		Bronze	
1 m diving	Drew Livingston; Texas	442.70; MR	David Boudia; Purdue	420.80	Eric Sehn; Texas A&M	420.70
3 m diving	David Boudia; Purdue	493.10; MR	Kelly Marx; Auburn	454.85	Hugh Showe III; Ohio	447.25
Platform diving	David Boudia; Purdue	530.45; MR	Drew Livingston; Texas	493.20	Reuben Ross; Miami	452.75

Legend: MR – Meet record;

== See also ==
- List of college swimming and diving teams
