= 2010 Pan Pacific Swimming Championships – Men's 50 metre butterfly =

Men's 50 metre butterfly at the 2010 Pan Pacific Swimming Championships
- Venue: William Woollett Jr. Aquatics Center
- Dates: August 18, 2010 (heats & finals)
- Competitors: 30 from 15 nations
- Winning time: 23.03

Medalists
gold medal	César Cielo	Brazil
silver medal	Nicholas Santos	Brazil
bronze medal	Roland Schoeman	South Africa

The men's 50 metre butterfly competition at the 2010 Pan Pacific Swimming Championships took place on August 18 at the William Woollett Jr. Aquatics Center. It was the first appearance of this event in the Pan Pacific Swimming Championships.

== Records ==
Prior to this competition, the existing world record was as follows:

World record	Rafal Muñoz (ESP)	22.43	Málaga, Spain	April 5, 2009

== Results ==
All times are in minutes and seconds.

KEY:	q	Fastest non-qualifiers	Q	Qualified	CR	Championships record	NR	National record	PB	Personal best	SB	Seasonal best

=== Heats ===
The first round was held on August 18, at 10:07.

Rank	Heat	Lane	Name	Nationality	Time	Notes
1	4	5	Geoff Huegill	Australia	23.27	QA, CR
2	4	4	Roland Schoeman	South Africa	23.41	QA
3	3	3	César Cielo	Brazil	23.48	QA
4	2	6	Timothy Phillips	United States	23.69	QA
5	2	5	Mitchell Patterson	Australia	23.80	QA
6	3	4	Nicholas Santos	Brazil	23.82	QA
7	2	3	Masayuki Kishida	Japan	23.85	QA
8	3	6	Cullen Jones	United States	23.87	QA
9	2	4	Andrew Lauterstein	Australia	23.90	QB
10	3	5	Gláuber Silva	Brazil	24.00	QB
11	4	2	Ryan Pini	Papua New Guinea	24.11	QB
12	3	2	Tyler McGill	United States	24.21	QB
13	4	7	Chris Wright	Australia	24.29	QB
14	3	1	Joe Bartoch	Canada	24.37	QB
15	4	3	Ryo Takayasu	Japan	24.38	QB
16	3	7	Rammaru Harada	Japan	24.44	QB
17	4	8	Graeme Moore	South Africa	24.46	
18	4	6	Jeong Doo-Hee	South Korea	24.60	
19	2	7	Joaquin Belza	Argentina	24.76	
20	2	8	Park Minkyu	South Korea	24.94	
21	1	6	Robert Margalis	United States	25.11	
22	4	1	Daniel Coakley	Philippines	25.32	
23	1	5	Luke Peddie	Canada	25:36	
24	2	2	Carl O'Donnell	New Zealand	25:39	
25	1	4	Taki Mrabet	Tunisia	25:49	
26	2	1	Nicholas Tan	Singapore	25:55	
27	1	7	Timothy Ferris	Zimbabwe	25:86	
28	3	8	Yan Ho-Chun	Hong Kong	25:92	
29	1	3	Kong Chun-Yin	Hong Kong	26:03	
30	1	2	Paul Kornfeld	Canada	26:39	

=== B Final ===
The B final was held on August 18, at 18:19.

Rank	Lane	Name	Nationality	Time	Notes
9	5	Gláuber Silva	Brazil	23.64	
10	3	Ryan Pini	Papua New Guinea	24.04	
11	6	Tyler McGill	United States	24.09	
12	4	Andrew Lauterstein	Australia	24.10	
13	7	Ryo Takayasu	Japan	24.21	
14	8	Graeme Moore	South Africa	24.31	
15	2	Joe Bartoch	Canada	24.33	
16	1	Rammaru Harada	Japan	24.49	

=== A Final ===
The A final was held on August 18, at 18:19.

Rank	Lane	Name	Nationality	Time	Notes
1st place, gold medalist(s)	3	César Cielo	Brazil	23.03	CR
2nd place, silver medalist(s)	7	Nicholas Santos	Brazil	23.33	
3rd place, bronze medalist(s)	5	Roland Schoeman	South Africa	23.39	
4	4	Geoff Huegill	Australia	23.42	
5	8	Cullen Jones	United States	23.50	
5	1	Masayuki Kishida	Japan	23.77	
7	6	Timothy Phillips	United States	23.92	
8	2	Mitchell Patterson	Australia	23.94	
