= Nathan Adrian =

American swimmer (born 1988)

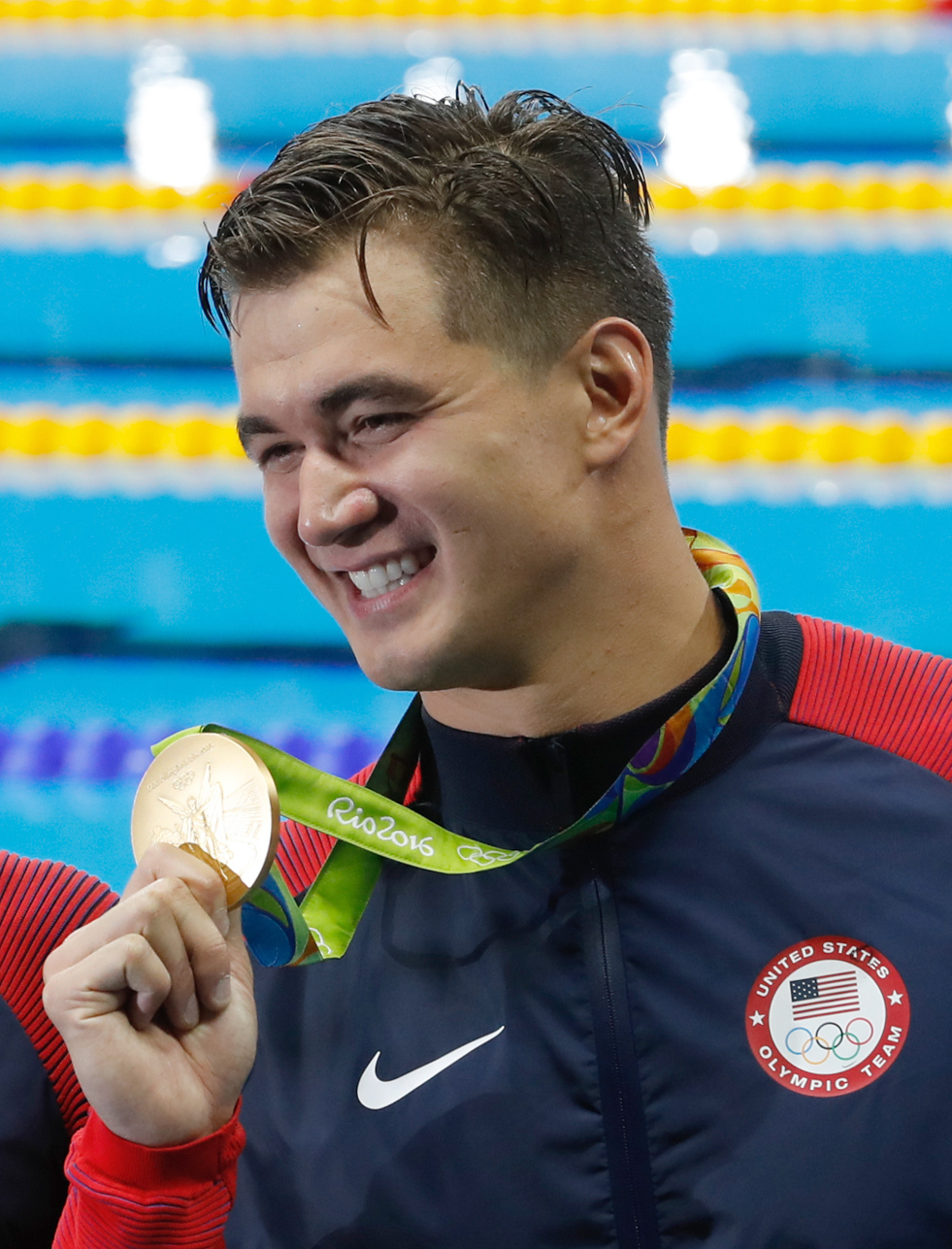
- Adrian at the 2016 Summer Olympics

Personal information
- Full name: Nathan Ghar-jun Adrian
- National team: United States
- Born: December 7, 1988 (age 37) Bremerton, Washington, U.S.
- Height: 6 ft 6 in (198 cm)
- Weight: 225 lb (102 kg)

Sport
- Sport: Swimming
- Strokes: Freestyle
- College team: University of California, Berkeley
- Coach: Dave Durden (Berkeley)
Medal record
Men's swimming
Representing the United States
| Event | 1st | 2nd | 3rd |
|---|---|---|---|
| Olympic Games | 5 | 1 | 2 |
| World Championships (LC) | 10 | 4 | 2 |
| World Championships (SC) | 2 | 1 | 0 |
| Pan Pacific Championships | 6 | 2 | 1 |
| Pan American Games | 2 | 3 | 0 |
| Total | 25 | 11 | 5 |
Olympic Games
| Gold medal – first place | 2008 Beijing | 4×100 m freestyle |
| Gold medal – first place | 2012 London | 100 m freestyle |
| Gold medal – first place | 2012 London | 4×100 m medley |
| Gold medal – first place | 2016 Rio de Janeiro | 4×100 m freestyle |
| Gold medal – first place | 2016 Rio de Janeiro | 4×100 m medley |
| Silver medal – second place | 2012 London | 4×100 m freestyle |
| Bronze medal – third place | 2016 Rio de Janeiro | 50 m freestyle |
| Bronze medal – third place | 2016 Rio de Janeiro | 100 m freestyle |
World Championships (LC)
| Gold medal – first place | 2009 Rome | 4×100 m freestyle |
| Gold medal – first place | 2009 Rome | 4×100 m medley |
| Gold medal – first place | 2011 Shanghai | 4×100 m medley |
| Gold medal – first place | 2015 Kazan | 4×100 m medley |
| Gold medal – first place | 2015 Kazan | 4×100 m mixed freestyle |
| Gold medal – first place | 2017 Budapest | 4×100 m freestyle |
| Gold medal – first place | 2017 Budapest | 4×100 m medley |
| Gold medal – first place | 2017 Budapest | 4×100 m mixed freestyle |
| Gold medal – first place | 2019 Gwangju | 4×100 m freestyle |
| Gold medal – first place | 2019 Gwangju | 4×100 m mixed freestyle |
| Silver medal – second place | 2013 Barcelona | 4×100 m freestyle |
| Silver medal – second place | 2015 Kazan | 50 m freestyle |
| Silver medal – second place | 2017 Budapest | 100 m freestyle |
| Silver medal – second place | 2019 Gwangju | 4×100 m medley |
| Bronze medal – third place | 2011 Shanghai | 4×100 m freestyle |
| Bronze medal – third place | 2013 Barcelona | 100 m freestyle |
World Championships (SC)
| Gold medal – first place | 2008 Manchester | 100 m freestyle |
| Gold medal – first place | 2008 Manchester | 4×100 m freestyle |
| Silver medal – second place | 2008 Manchester | 4×100 m medley |
Pan Pacific Championships
| Gold medal – first place | 2010 Irvine | 50 m freestyle |
| Gold medal – first place | 2010 Irvine | 100 m freestyle |
| Gold medal – first place | 2010 Irvine | 4×100 m freestyle |
| Gold medal – first place | 2010 Irvine | 4×100 m medley |
| Gold medal – first place | 2014 Gold Coast | 4×100 m medley |
| Gold medal – first place | 2018 Tokyo | 4×100 m medley |
| Silver medal – second place | 2014 Gold Coast | 100 m freestyle |
| Silver medal – second place | 2014 Gold Coast | 4×100 m freestyle |
| Bronze medal – third place | 2014 Gold Coast | 50 m freestyle |
Pan American Games
| Gold medal – first place | 2019 Lima | 4×100 m medley |
| Gold medal – first place | 2019 Lima | 4×100 m mixed freestyle |
| Silver medal – second place | 2019 Lima | 4×100 m freestyle |
| Silver medal – second place | 2019 Lima | 50 m freestyle |
| Silver medal – second place | 2019 Lima | 100 m freestyle |
Representing the California Golden Bears
| Event | 1st | 2nd | 3rd |
|---|---|---|---|
| NCAA Championships | 11 | 3 | 2 |
| Total | 11 | 3 | 2 |
By race
| Event | 1st | 2nd | 3rd |
|---|---|---|---|
| 50 y freestyle | 2 | 1 | 0 |
| 100 y freestyle | 3 | 0 | 0 |
| 4×50 y freestyle | 1 | 1 | 1 |
| 4×50 y medley | 1 | 1 | 0 |
| 4×100 y freestyle | 2 | 0 | 1 |
| 4×100 y medley | 2 | 0 | 0 |
| Total | 11 | 3 | 2 |
NCAA Championships
| Gold medal – first place | 2009 College Station | 50 y freestyle |
| Gold medal – first place | 2009 College Station | 100 y freestyle |
| Gold medal – first place | 2010 Columbus | 100 y freestyle |
| Gold medal – first place | 2010 Columbus | 4×50 y freestyle |
| Gold medal – first place | 2010 Columbus | 4×100 y freestyle |
| Gold medal – first place | 2010 Columbus | 4×100 y medley |
| Gold medal – first place | 2011 Minneapolis | 50 y freestyle |
| Gold medal – first place | 2011 Minneapolis | 100 y freestyle |
| Gold medal – first place | 2011 Minneapolis | 4×100 y freestyle |
| Gold medal – first place | 2011 Minneapolis | 4×50 y medley |
| Gold medal – first place | 2011 Minneapolis | 4×100 y medley |
| Silver medal – second place | 2009 College Station | 4×50 y medley |
| Silver medal – second place | 2010 Columbus | 50 y freestyle |
| Silver medal – second place | 2011 Minneapolis | 4×50 y freestyle |
| Bronze medal – third place | 2009 College Station | 4×50 y freestyle |
| Bronze medal – third place | 2009 College Station | 4×100 y freestyle |

Nathan Adrian
- Traditional Chinese: 倪家駿
- Simplified Chinese: 倪家骏
Transcriptions
Standard Mandarin
- Hanyu Pinyin: Ní Jiājùn
Yue: Cantonese
- Jyutping: Ngai4 Gaa1–zeon3

Nathan Ghar-jun Adrian (born December 7, 1988) is an American competitive swimmer and five-time Olympic gold medalist who formerly held the American record in the long course 50-meter freestyle event.

In his Olympic debut at the 2008 Summer Olympics, Adrian swam in the heats of the 4×100-meter freestyle relay and earned a gold medal when the United States team won in the final. At the 2012 Summer Olympics, Adrian won gold medals in both the 100-meter freestyle and the 4×100-meter medley relay, and a silver medal in the 4×100-meter freestyle relay. He has won thirty-two medals in major international competitions; twenty gold, seven silver, and five bronze in such competitions as the Summer Olympics, the FINA World Aquatics Championships, and the Pan Pacific Swimming Championships. In the 2016 Summer Olympics 4x100-meter freestyle relay a gold was won with Michael Phelps, Caeleb Dressel, and Ryan Held. He was an individual bronze medalist in the 50-meter and 100-meter freestyles.

== Early years ==
Adrian was born in Bremerton, Washington, in 1988. He is the son of Cecilia and James Adrian. His mother is Chinese from Hong Kong and works as a nurse for the Bremerton school district; his father is a retired nuclear engineer for the Puget Sound Naval Shipyard. Adrian has an older sister, Donella, who swam at Arizona State University, and an older brother, Justin, who swam at the University of Washington. Adrian started swimming at the age of five because of the influence of his siblings. He graduated in 2006 from Bremerton High School, where he swam for the school team.

Adrian attended the University of California, Berkeley in fall 2006, where he majored in public health and competed in swimming under Head Coach Dave Durden. He graduated with honors in the spring of 2012. Adrian was a five-time individual NCAA champion, winning the 50-yard freestyle in 2009 and 2011 and the 100-yard freestyle in 2009, 2010, and 2011.

== Career ==
=== 2008 Short Course World Championships ===
At the 2008 Short Course World Championships, Adrian won gold in the 100-meter freestyle and 4×100-meter freestyle relay and silver in the 4×100-meter medley relay. In the 4×100-meter freestyle relay, Adrian combined with Ryan Lochte, Bryan Lundquist and Doug Van Wie won gold in a world record time of 3:08.44. In his second event, the 100-meter freestyle, Adrian won gold in a time of 46.67, just ahead of Filippo Magnini who finished second with a time of 46.70. For his last event, the 4×100-meter medley relay, Adrian combined with Randall Bal, Mark Gangloff and Ryan Lochte, won silver behind Russia.

=== 2008 Beijing Summer Olympics ===
2008 Summer Olympics
| Gold medal – first place | 4×100 m freestyle | 3:08.24 (WR) |

At the 2008 United States Olympic Trials, Adrian placed fourth in the 100-meter freestyle, qualifying him to swim in the 4×100-meter freestyle relay at the Olympics. He also placed sixth in the 50-meter freestyle.

At the 2008 Summer Olympics in Beijing, Adrian swam the first leg in the preliminary heats of the 4×100-meter freestyle relay, splitting a time of 48.82 seconds. Cullen Jones, Ben Wildman-Tobriner and Matt Grevers completed the relay with a final time of 3:12.23, a world record. This record was broken one day later when Michael Phelps, Garrett Weber-Gale, Cullen Jones and Jason Lezak swam a time of 3:08.24, beating France and Australia in the final. By swimming in the heats, Adrian earned a gold medal even though he didn't swim in the final.

Adrian was training under coach Mike Bottom in the Florida Keys as part of The Race Club swimming training program World Team leading up to the 2008 Olympics.

=== 2009 World Championships ===
At the 2009 National Championships, Adrian placed first in the 50-meter and 100-meter freestyle events, qualifying him to swim at the 2009 World Aquatics Championships in Rome.

At the 2009 World Aquatics Championships, Adrian earned gold in the 4×100-meter freestyle relay and the 4×100-meter medley relay. Adrian also placed sixth in the 50-meter freestyle and tenth in the 100-meter freestyle. After Michael Phelps, Ryan Lochte and Matt Grevers completed their legs in the 4×100-meter freestyle relay, the United States had a slight deficit behind the Russian team. However, Adrian swam the anchor leg in 46.79 to overtake Danila Izotov for first place. The final time of 3:09.21 was a championship record. In the 4×100-meter medley relay, Adrian contributed in the heats (with Matt Grevers, Mark Gangloff and Tyler McGill) and earned a gold medal when the U.S. team placed first in the final.

=== 2010 ===
At the 2010 National Championships, Adrian qualified to compete at the 2010 Pan Pacific Swimming Championships by winning the 50-meter and 100-meter freestyle titles. His win in the 100-meter freestyle also guaranteed him a spot on the 4×100-meter freestyle and 4×100-meter medley relay teams.

At the 2010 Pan Pacific Swimming Championships, Adrian won a total of four gold medals, the best performance of his career. In his first event, the 100-meter freestyle, Adrian won the gold medal in 48.15, beating Canadian Brent Hayden and world-record holder in the 100-meter freestyle César Cielo. The following day, Adrian lined up alongside Michael Phelps, Ryan Lochte and Jason Lezak to anchor the 4×100-meter freestyle relay. With no competition, Adrian recorded a time of 47.51 and the U.S. team won the gold in a time of 3:11.74. The following day, Adrian then competed in the 50-meter freestyle and the 4×100-meter medley relay. In the final of the 50-meter freestyle, Adrian shocked favorite Cielo, winning in a time of 21.55 seconds; Cielo finished second in 21.57. About an hour and a half later, Adrian competed in the 4×100-meter medley relay with Aaron Peirsol, Mark Gangloff and Michael Phelps. Swimming the freestyle leg, Adrian recorded a time of 47.54, the fastest in the field and the U.S. team won the gold in a time of 3:32.48.

=== 2011 ===
==== 2011 World Championships ====
Adrian won his first medal, a bronze, in the 4×100-meter freestyle relay with Michael Phelps, Garrett Weber-Gale and Jason Lezak. Swimming the anchor leg, Adrian recorded a time of 47.40. In the final of the 100-meter freestyle, Adrian placed sixth with a time of 48.23, well off his semi-final time of 48.05. In the 50-meter freestyle final, Adrian placed fourth with a time of 21.93 seconds, just one one-hundredth (0.01) of a second ahead behind third-place finisher Alain Bernard. In his last event, the 4×100-meter medley relay, Adrian teamed with Mark Gangloff, Michael Phelps, and Nick Thoman to win gold in a time of 3:32.06. Swimming the freestyle leg, Adrian had a time of 47.64.

==== 2011 National Championships ====
At the 2011 National Championships, Adrian defended his 50-meter freestyle title with a time of 21.84 seconds. His time moved him to fourth in the world behind César Cielo (21.52), Bruno Fratus (21.76), and Frédérick Bousquet (21.78). He chose to sit out of the 100-meter freestyle in order to prepare for the 2012 Summer Olympics.

=== 2012 London Summer Olympics ===
2012 Olympics
| Gold medal – first place | 100 m freestyle | 47.52 |
| Gold medal – first place | 4×100 m medley relay | 3:29.35 |
| Silver medal – second place | 4×100 m freestyle relay | 3:10.38 |

At the 2012 U.S. Olympic Trials in Omaha, Nebraska, the qualifying meet for the 2012 Olympics, Adrian made the U.S. Olympic team for the second time by finishing first in his first event, the 100-meter freestyle. In the final of the 100-meter freestyle, Adrian posted a time of 48.10 seconds to finish ahead of Cullen Jones, who had a time of 48.46. He also placed third for the 50-meter freestyle with a time of 21.68, just missing a spot in that event.

At the 2012 Summer Olympics in London, Adrian won his inaugural Olympiad medal, a silver, in the 4×100-meter freestyle relay with Michael Phelps, Cullen Jones and Ryan Lochte, with the team finishing behind France. Swimming the lead-off leg, Adrian recorded a split of 47.89 seconds, and the team finished with a final time of 3:10.38. Adrian's lead-off time was the fastest first leg in the field, and Adrian's inaugural time breaking 48 seconds.

On the fifth day of competition, Adrian won the gold medal in the 100-meter freestyle final, defeating favorite James Magnussen of Australia by one one-hundredth (0.01) of a second. In the race, Adrian set a new personal record with a time of 47.52. Going into the 100-meter freestyle final, Adrian was seeded second with a time of 47.97, which was only the second time he ever broke 48 seconds in the event. In winning the 100-meter freestyle, Adrian became the first American male to win the event since Matt Biondi did in 1988.

Adrian won a second gold medal as a member of the winning U.S. team in the 4×100-meter medley relay on the final day of the competition. He swam the anchor freestyle leg, with Matt Grevers swimming the backstroke leadoff leg, Brendan Hansen the breaststroke second leg, and Michael Phelps the butterfly third leg. The Americans recorded a time of 3:29:35, with the Japanese team taking the silver medal and the Australians receiving the bronze. In the race, Adrian had a split of 46.85, the fastest in the field.

In August 2012, a street in Adrian's hometown, Bremerton, Washington, was renamed "Nathan Adrian Drive" for Adrian's Olympic achievements.

=== 2013 World Championships ===
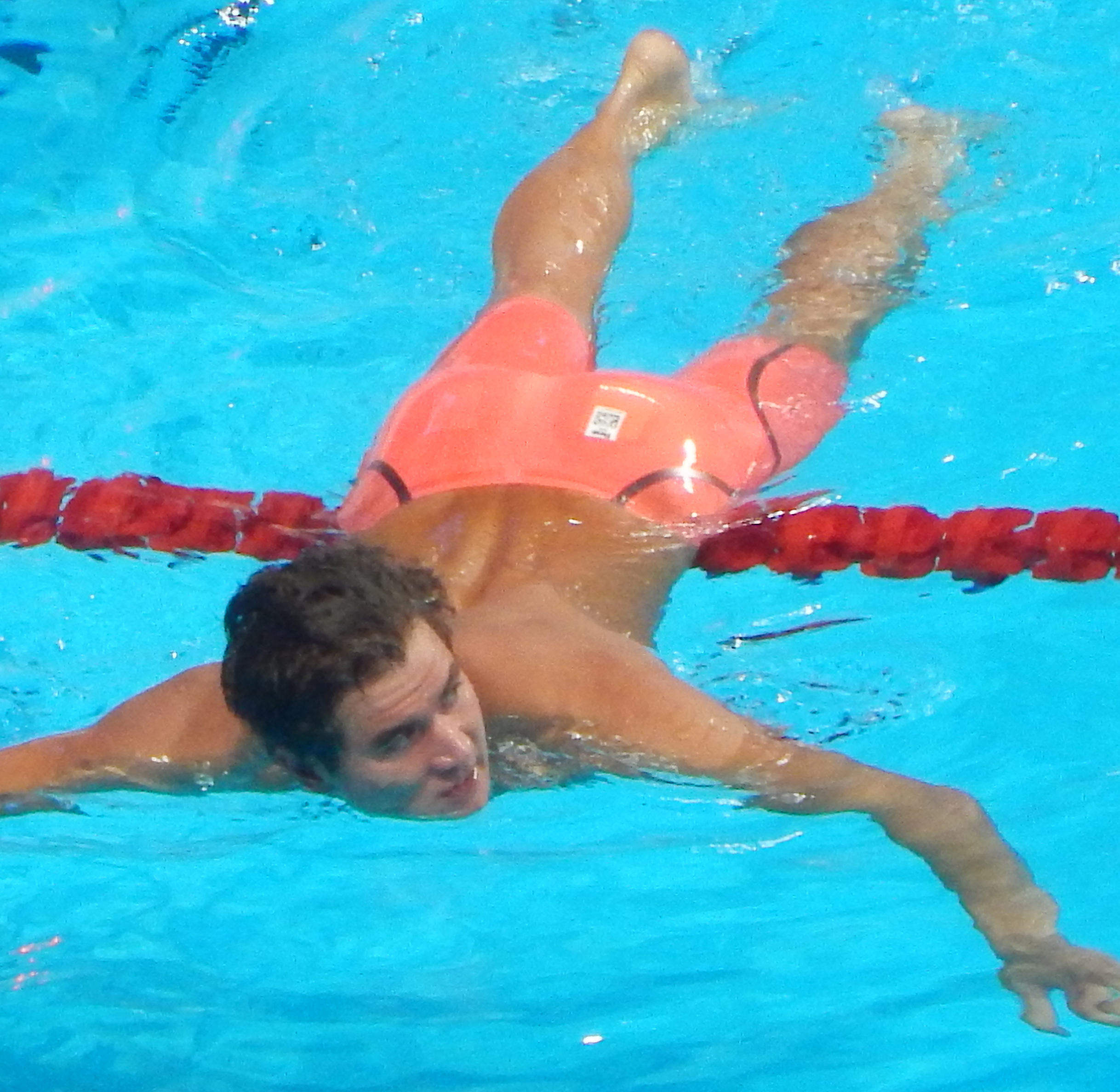
Adrian claims gold in relay at the 2015 World Championships

At the 2013 U.S. National Championships, Adrian qualified to swim at the 2013 World Aquatics Championships in Barcelona by placing first in the 50 and 100-meter freestyle with times of 21.47 and 48.10, respectively.

In his first event at the World Championships, Adrian combined with Ryan Lochte, Anthony Ervin, and Jimmy Feigen in the 4×100-meter freestyle relay, with the team finishing behind France. Swimming the lead-off leg, Adrian recorded a split of 47.95 seconds, and the team finished with a final time of 3:11.42. Adrian's lead-off time was the fastest first leg in the field.

Adrian advanced to the 100-meter freestyle final as the top seed by posting 47.95 in the semi-finals. In the 100-meter freestyle, Adrian won bronze in a time of 47.84, only two-hundredths of a second behind second-place finisher Jimmy Feigen. In his second individual event, the 50-meter freestyle, Adrian was just off the podium with a fourth-place finish, finishing with a time of 21.60.

=== 2015 World Championships ===
At the 2015 World Championships, Adrian swam in two relays and two individual events. In the 4x100 freestyle relay, the US team failed to advance to the final in the heats, so Adrian could not swim the finals of the relay. In his first individual event, the 100-meter freestyle, Adrian tied for seventh in the final, finishing in 48.31. Nonetheless, Adrian bounced back to break a six-year old American record in the 50-meter freestyle in 21.37 seconds in the semifinals. In the final, Adrian won a silver medal in the 50-meter freestyle, touching second behind Florent Manadou in 21.52. On the same night, Adrian was also part of the winning 4x100-meter mixed freestyle relay along with Ryan Lochte, Simone Manuel, and Missy Franklin. They broke the world record with a time of 3:23.05. Adrian won another gold medal in the 4x100-meter medley relay with Ryan Murphy, Kevin Cordes, and Tom Shields. He anchored in 47.41 to touch the wall at 3:29.93.

=== 2016 Rio Summer Olympics ===
At the 2016 United States Olympic Trials, the U.S. qualifying meet for the Rio Olympics, Adrian qualified for his third Olympiad by winning both the 50- and 100-meter freestyle. He finished half a second ahead of the field in the 100-meter freestyle in 47.72. In the 50-meter freestyle, Adrian redeemed his third-place finish from the 2012 Trials by finishing first in 21.51, one hundredth of a second ahead of second-place finisher Anthony Ervin.

2016 Summer Olympics
| Gold medal – first place | 4×100 m freestyle | 3:09.92 |
| Gold medal – first place | 4×100 m medley | 3:27.95 (OR) |
| Bronze medal – third place | 50 m freestyle | 21.49 |
| Bronze medal – third place | 100 m freestyle | 47.85 |

In Rio de Janeiro, Adrian won a total of four medals. He won his first medal as the anchor for the 4×100-meter freestyle relay alongside Caeleb Dressel, Michael Phelps, and Ryan Held. The Americans, with Dressel and Held as first-time Olympic competitors, finished with a time of 3:09.92, followed by France and Australia. Adrian's final leg was 46.97 seconds, the fastest of the field. In his first individual event, the 100-meter freestyle, Adrian touched third behind Kyle Chalmers and Pieter Timmers in 47.85 seconds. Adrian won another bronze medal in the 50-meter freestyle, finishing in 21.49 seconds. Another American, Anthony Ervin, won in 21.40 seconds and the defending Olympic champion Florent Manadou took second. He capped off his Olympics with another gold medal in the 4x100-meter medley relay on the final day of the competition, swimming alongside Ryan Murphy, Cody Miller, and Michael Phelps. He anchored the relay with a 46.74 split to bring home the gold in 3:27.95, a new Olympic record.

=== 2018 Pan Pacific Championships ===
At the 2018 Pan Pacific Swimming Championships during August 2018 in Tokyo, Japan, Adrian won a gold medal as part of the USA men's relay in the 4x100-meter medley relay event swimming a 47.71 on the freestyle leg of the relay.

=== 2019 ===
==== 2019 World Aquatics Championships ====
After fighting off testicular cancer and not being able to swim or lift weights over 15 pounds for some time, Adrian was back to swimming at the 2019 World Aquatics Championships in July 2019 in Gwangju, South Korea. He won a gold medal in the men's 4x100-meter freestyle relay, swimming a 47.08 as the anchoring leg of the USA's relay.

==== 2019 Pan American Games ====
Adrian competed at the 2019 Pan American Games in Lima, Peru in August 2019. As part of his efforts at the games, Adrian won silver in the men's 4x100-meter freestyle relay, gold in the mixed 4x100-meter freestyle relay, silver in the men's 100-meter freestyle, silver in the men's 50-meter freestyle, and gold in the men's 4x100-meter medley relay.

=== 2021 ===
==== 2020 US Olympic Trials ====
Adrian entered to swim two individual events at the 2020 US Olympic Trials (postponed to June 2021 due to the COVID-19 pandemic), the 100-meter freestyle and 50-meter freestyle.

On the fourth day of the Olympic Trials, Adrian competed in the prelims of the 100-meter freestyle, ranking 6th of all heats and advancing to the semifinals with a time of 48.37. In the semifinals, Adrian swam a 48.92 coming in 13th for both semifinals and not qualifying for the final.

In the morning prelims of the 50-meter freestyle on day seven of competition, Adrian ranked third with his swim of 21.85 and qualified for the semifinals. During the semifinals Adrian lowered his time to a 21.78 and ranked third across both heats. This swim advanced him to the event final the following day. Adrian finished third in the final on day eight, not qualifying to swim the 50 meter freestyle at the 2020 Summer Olympics with his time of 21.73.

Adrian had hoped to culminate his overcoming testicular cancer journey by competing in his fourth Olympic Games. His swims at the 2020 US Olympic Trials confirmed that his fourth Olympic Games would not be the 2020 Summer Olympics in Tokyo. While he did not make the 2020 US Olympic Team, Adrian's swims earned him a spot on the 2021–2022 US National Team, marking the 14th time he had achieved a spot on the team.

== Personal bests ==
As of July 31, 2017

Long Course Meters
| Event | Time | Meet | Date | Note(s) |
| 50 m freestyle | 21.37 | 2015 World Aquatics Championships | August 7, 2015 | Former AM |
| 100 m freestyle | 47.52 | 2012 Summer Olympics | August 4, 2012 | |

Short Course Meters
| Event | Time | Meet | Date | Note(s) |
| 50 m freestyle | 20.71 | 2009 Duel in the Pool | December 18, 2009 | Unofficial AM |
| 100 m freestyle | 45.08 | 2009 Duel in the Pool | December 19, 2009 | =Unofficial AM |

Short Course Yards
| Event | Time | Meet | Date | Note(s) |
| 50 y freestyle | 18.66 | 2011 NCAA Championships | March 24, 2011 | Former AM |
| 100 y freestyle | 41.08 | 2009 NCAA Championships | March 28, 2009 | Former AM |

== Personal life ==
In May 2017, Adrian became engaged to merchandising director Hallie Ivester after six years of dating. They were married on September 15, 2018, in Rutherford, California They have three daughters: born in February 2021, August 2022, and June 2025.

In January 2019, Adrian announced on Instagram that he was diagnosed with testicular cancer, for which he underwent surgery.

== Trivia ==
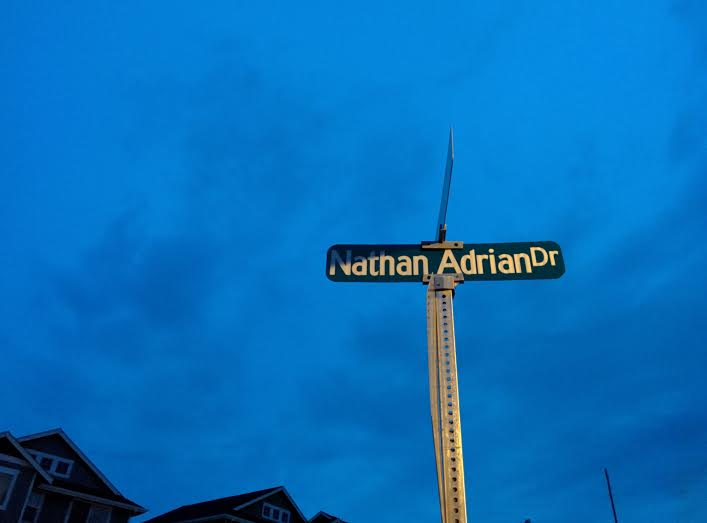
Nathan Adrian Drive road sign in Bremerton, Washington

Adrian appeared in episode 5 of the 2009 season of the Discovery Channel series, MythBusters, to assist hosts Adam Savage and Jamie Hyneman in testing the myth that it is possible to swim as fast in syrup as in water. His test results however, were declared invalid by Savage and Hyneman, because they determined that Adrian was so used to swimming in water, that his technique was completely disrupted when swimming in the syrup. This disruption caused his lap times when swimming in syrup to vary wildly in comparison with his extremely consistent lap times in water.

In 2014, Adrian was inducted into The Robert Chinn Foundation Asian Hall of Fame.

== See also ==
- List of multiple Olympic gold medalists
- List of multiple Summer Olympic medalists
- List of Olympic medalists in swimming (men)
- List of United States records in swimming
- List of University of California, Berkeley alumni
- List of World Aquatics Championships medalists in swimming (men)
- List of world records in swimming
- World record progression 4 × 100 metres freestyle relay
- World record progression 4 × 100 metres medley relay
