= César Cielo =

Brazilian swimmer (born 1987)

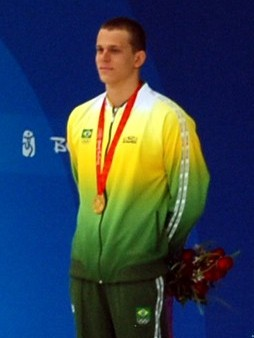
- Cielo after winning the 50 m freestyle at the 2008 Olympics in Beijing

Personal information
- Full name: César Augusto Cielo Filho
- Nickname: Cesão
- Born: 10 January 1987 (age 39) Santa Bárbara d'Oeste, São Paulo, Brazil
- Height: 1.95 m (6 ft 5 in)
- Weight: 80 kg (176 lb)
- Website: CesarCielo.com.br

Sport
- Sport: Swimming
- Strokes: Freestyle, butterfly
- Club: Marcílio Dias
- College team: Auburn University
Medal record
Men's swimming
Representing Brazil
Event	1st	2nd	3rd
Olympic Games	1	0	2
World Championships (LC)	6	1	0
World Championships (SC)	5	1	6
Pan Pacific Championships	1	1	1
Pan American Games	7	1	0
Total	20	4	9
Olympic Games
Gold medal – first place	2008 Beijing	50 m freestyle
Bronze medal – third place	2008 Beijing	100 m freestyle
Bronze medal – third place	2012 London	50 m freestyle
World Championships (LC)
Gold medal – first place	2009 Rome	50 m freestyle
Gold medal – first place	2009 Rome	100 m freestyle
Gold medal – first place	2011 Shanghai	50 m freestyle
Gold medal – first place	2011 Shanghai	50 m butterfly
Gold medal – first place	2013 Barcelona	50 m freestyle
Gold medal – first place	2013 Barcelona	50 m butterfly
Silver medal – second place	2017 Budapest	4×100 m freestyle
World Championships (SC)
Gold medal – first place	2010 Dubai	50 m freestyle
Gold medal – first place	2010 Dubai	100 m freestyle
Gold medal – first place	2014 Doha	100 m freestyle
Gold medal – first place	2014 Doha	4×50 m medley
Gold medal – first place	2014 Doha	4×100 m medley
Silver medal – second place	2004 Indianapolis	4×100 m freestyle
Bronze medal – third place	2010 Dubai	4×100 m freestyle
Bronze medal – third place	2010 Dubai	4×100 m medley
Bronze medal – third place	2014 Doha	50 m freestyle
Bronze medal – third place	2014 Doha	4×50 m mixed freestyle
Bronze medal – third place	2018 Hangzhou	4×100 m freestyle
Bronze medal – third place	2018 Hangzhou	4×50 m medley
Pan Pacific Championships
Gold medal – first place	2010 Irvine	50 m butterfly
Silver medal – second place	2010 Irvine	50 m freestyle
Bronze medal – third place	2010 Irvine	100 m freestyle
Pan American Games
Gold medal – first place	2007 Rio de Janeiro	50 m freestyle
Gold medal – first place	2007 Rio de Janeiro	100 m freestyle
Gold medal – first place	2007 Rio de Janeiro	4×100 m freestyle
Gold medal – first place	2011 Guadalajara	50 m freestyle
Gold medal – first place	2011 Guadalajara	100 m freestyle
Gold medal – first place	2011 Guadalajara	4×100 m freestyle
Gold medal – first place	2011 Guadalajara	4×100 m medley
Silver medal – second place	2007 Rio de Janeiro	4×100 m medley

César Augusto Cielo Filho (Portuguese pronunciation: [ˈsɛzɐʁ siˈelu ˈfiʎu], born 10 January 1987) is a Brazilian former competitive swimmer who specialized in sprint events. He is the most successful Brazilian swimmer in history, having obtained three Olympic medals, winning six individual World Championship gold medals and breaking two world records.

Cielo is a former world record holder in the 50-metre freestyle and 100-metre freestyle events (both long course). He received induction into the International Swimming Hall of Fame in September 2023. César Cielo is the third Brazilian to enter the International Swimming Hall of Fame, after Maria Lenk and Gustavo Borges.

His gold medal at the 2008 Summer Olympics, in the 50-metre freestyle competition, is Brazil's only Olympic gold in swimming to date. In 2008, he broke the NCAA record in the 50-yard (46 m) freestyle (18.47 seconds) and in the 100-yard (91 m) freestyle (40.92 seconds). Cielo became the fastest swimmer in the world in the two distances, and was named NCAA Swimmer of the Year for the second year in a row.

== Early life ==
César Cielo was born in Santa Bárbara d'Oeste, São Paulo, Brazil. The son of pediatrician César Cielo and physical education teacher Flávia Cielo, Cielo began his athletic career at small swimming clubs in his native state. As a young teenager, Cielo trained under coach Mario Francisco Sobrinho at the Esporte Clube Barbarense, where his mother taught swimming. When he was 13, Cielo started training in Piracicaba at the Clube de Campo de Piracicaba under coach Reinaldo Rosa. At 16 years old, he transferred to Esporte Clube Pinheiros in São Paulo to train under coach Alberto Silva and Brazilian swimming legend Gustavo Borges. As a gift while at Esporte Clube Pinheiros, he received the swimsuit used by Borges in Athens 2004.

Cielo was a childhood friend of André Schultz. When Cielo was a child, his father formed a group to organize and encourage swimming at Esporte Clube Barbarense. Werner Schultz, André Schultz's father, also belonged to the group. They began to create competitions and take the boys on trips. At one point, there were 500 people practicing swimming at the club, in a city, which almost 20 years later, has less than 200,000 inhabitants. Werner Schultz constructed a swimming pool with two Olympic lanes in the courtyard of his house, where Cielo used to train. Since childhood, Cielo could not bear to lose. Maria Schultz, mother of André Schultz, said, "He could not bear to lose. Several American coaches say this: that good swimmers like to win, and exceptional not afford to lose. Such is the case of Cesão." Cielo was so eager for victory that during the 1996 Summer Olympics, at nine years old, he was already studying his main reference, Russian Alexander Popov, through videos, noting details like his starts (block outputs) and turnarounds.

Cielo started competing in backstroke. In the region at the time, Guilherme Guido stood out as the opponent to beat. Guido defeated Cielo repeatedly in freestyle, while Cielo won the backstroke events. However, at a certain point, Guido began to lose to freestyle opponents, and began competing in backstroke events. He defeated Cielo, who then decided not swim backstroke anymore. At age 15, Cielo attended a series of trainings in Florida, USA, and returned home, willing to defeat Guido. When Cielo and Guido were reunited in a 100m freestyle contest, Guido fell behind and lost. From then on, Guido focused on backstroke, reversing positions with Cielo.

== Collegiate career ==
In 2005, Cielo received a scholarship from Auburn University in the United States. He studied international trade with a specialization in Spanish. While there, Cielo competed for the eight-time NCAA National Champion Auburn Tigers swimming and diving team. At Auburn, he was trained by Brett Hawke, an Australian Olympic finalist swimmer in Athens. Hawke helped Cielo with his last months of preparation for the 2008 Summer Olympics in Beijing. Cielo was also tutored by short-distance specialist Fernando Scherer in 2008. At Auburn, Cielo's scholarship contract was very strict, prohibiting him from drinking alcohol or taking girlfriends on a night out.

Cielo held the NCAA and U.S. Open record for the 50-yard (46 m) freestyle, set at the 2008 NCAA Division 1 Swimming and Diving Championships. At Auburn, Cielo won six National Championship events, including sweeping the 50 and 100 freestyle championships in 2007. Cielo gave up his fourth and final year of NCAA eligibility to become a professional swimmer.

== International career ==
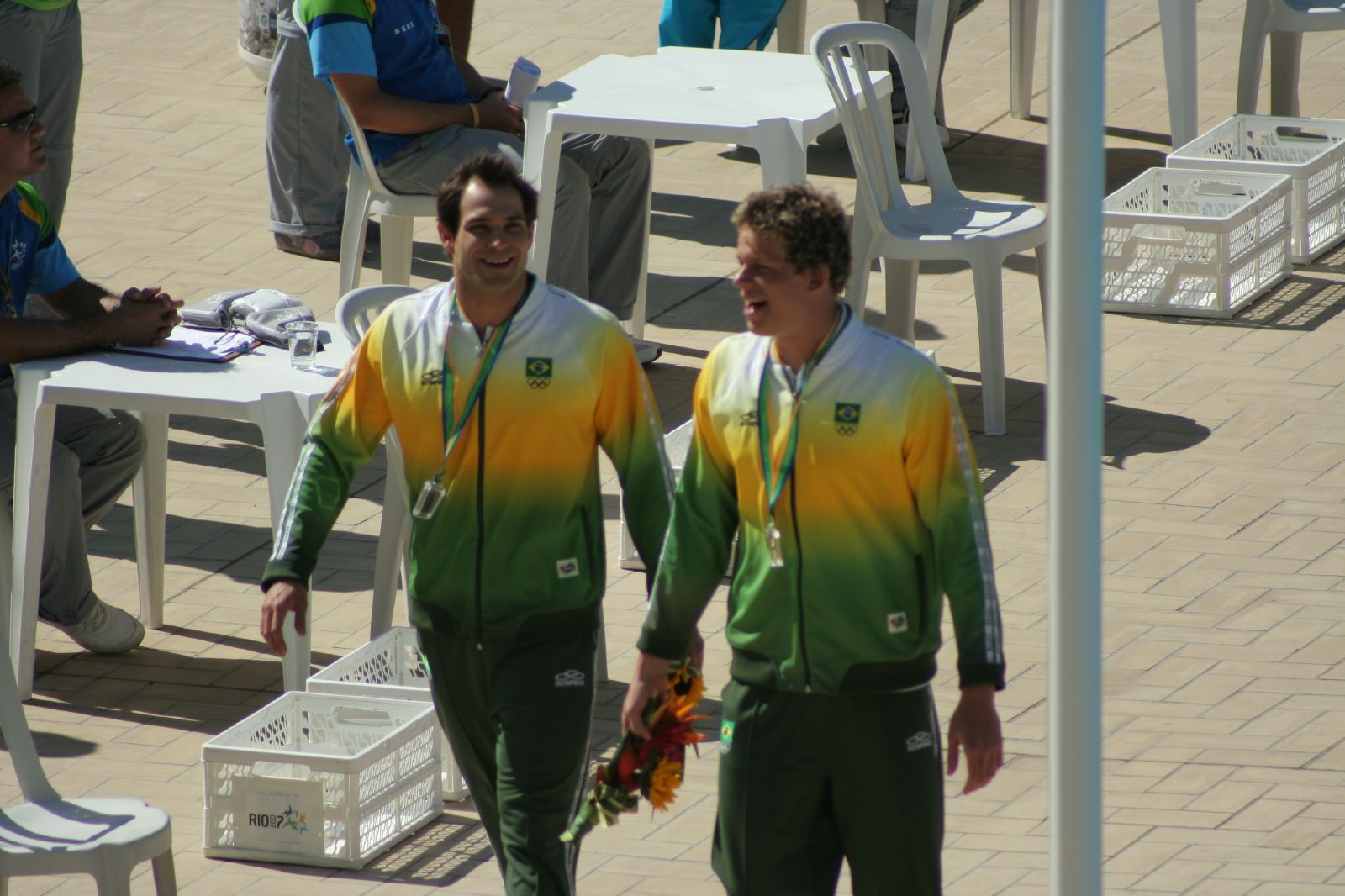
Nicholas Santos and Cielo at the 2007 Pan American Games in Rio de Janeiro

=== 2004 Short Course Swimming Championships ===
Cielo participated in his first major international tournament, the 2004 FINA World Swimming Championships (25 m), in the city of Indianapolis, in October 2004. At the age of 17, he won the silver medal in the 4×100-metre freestyle event. On a team with Guilherme Guido, Kaio Almeida and Eduardo Fischer, he finished 4th in the 4×100-metre medley, breaking the South American record with a time of 3:33.02. He also finished 6th in the 100-metre freestyle, 10th in the 50-metre freestyle, and 19th in the 50-metre backstroke.

=== 2006–2007 ===
Cielo competed in the 2006 FINA World Swimming Championships (25 m) in Shanghai, where he finished 5th in the 100-metre freestyle (only 17 hundredths of a second away from winning a medal) and in the 4×100-metre freestyle events. He also competed in the 4×200-metre freestyle, where he broke the South American record with a time of 7:06:09, along with Rodrigo Castro, Thiago Pereira and Lucas Salatta. In December, he began to stand out on the national scene, by breaking the South American record of Fernando Scherer in the 100-metre freestyle (48.69 seconds) which had stood since 1998. Cielo's time was 48.61 seconds, beating the record by 0.08 seconds. At that moment, Cielo's was the fourth fastest time in the 2006 world ranking.

Afterward, Cielo went to the 2006 Pan Pacific Swimming Championships in Victoria, British Columbia, Canada, where he finished 6th in the 50-metre freestyle, 7th in the 100-metre freestyle, 7th in the 4×100-metre medley, and was disqualified at the 4×100-metre freestyle.

Cielo was a finalist in the 2007 World Aquatics Championships in Melbourne, in the 100-metre freestyle (4th place, only 4 hundredths behind Eamon Sullivan, the bronze medalist, and 8 hundredths behind gold medalists Filippo Magnini and Brent Hayden), 50-metre freestyle (6th) and 4×100-metre freestyle (8th). He also took 9th place in the 4×100-metre medley. At that time, Cielo had established himself as the fastest Brazilian sprinter, by breaking the Fernando Scherer's South American record in the 50-metre freestyle. In that event's semifinal, Cielo swam for 22.09 seconds, improving on Fernando Scherer's time, from in August 1998, by nine hundredths of a second. He also broke his South American record in the 100-metre freestyle, with a time of 48.51 seconds, and the South American record of the 4×100-metre freestyle, with a time of 3:17.03, on a team with Thiago Pereira, Nicolas Oliveira and Rodrigo Castro.

At the 2007 Pan American Games in Rio de Janeiro, Cielo won three gold medals in the 50-metre, 100-metre, and 4×100-metre freestyle events, and a silver medal in the 4×100-metre medley. In the 50-metre freestyle, he won the event with a time of 21.84 seconds, beating the Pan American Games record, and becoming the first swimmer from South America to swim it in under 22 seconds. Cielo began to get close to the world record in the 50-metre freestyle, a time of 21.64 seconds, which at the time belonged to legendary swimmer Alexander Popov. He also broke the Pan Am Games and South American record in the 4×100-metre freestyle, with a time of 3:15.90, along with Fernando Silva, Eduardo Deboni and Nicolas Oliveira. In the 100-metre freestyle, he broke the Pan Am Games record with his time of 48.79 seconds, and in the 4×100-metre medley, he broke the South American record with a time of 3:35.81, along with Thiago Pereira, Henrique Barbosa and Kaio Almeida.

In November 2007, at the Italy Grand Prix, Cielo broke the short-course South American record for the 100-metre freestyle, with a time of 47.00 seconds.

=== 2008 ===
In February 2008, at the Missouri Grand Prix, Cielo improved his South American record in the 100-metre freestyle, with a time of 48.49 seconds. In April, at the Ohio Grand Prix, he broke the record again, with a time of 48.34 seconds, also defeating Michael Phelps.

A month before the Olympics, in July 2008, he broke his South American record in the 50-metre freestyle, with a time of 21.75 seconds.

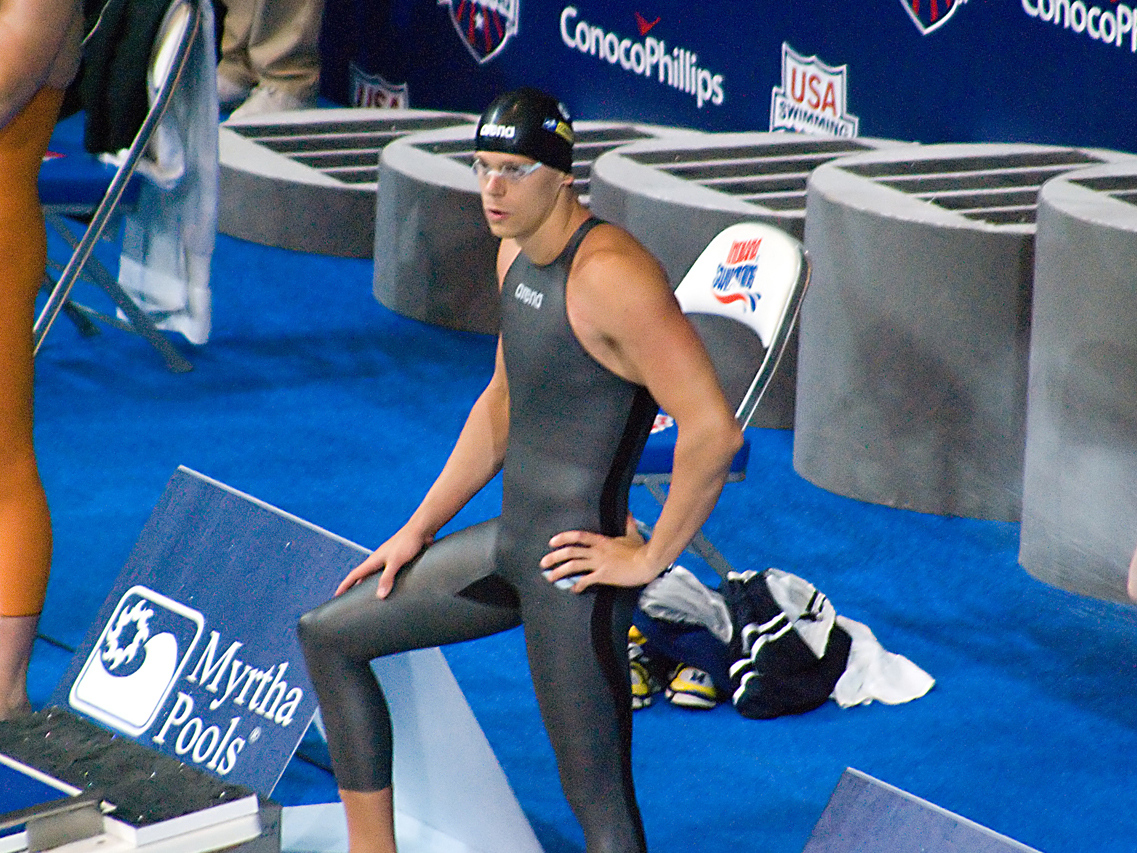
Cielo at the 2009 US National Championships in Indianapolis

Afterward, Cielo went to the 2008 Summer Olympics in Beijing, where he broke the Americas record in the 4×100-metre freestyle heats, with a time of 47.91 seconds. Although the Brazilian team was disqualified, Cielo's record was allowed to stand. In the 100-metre freestyle, Cielo qualified for the final, taking eighth place in the heats, with a time of 48.07 seconds. Cielo excelled in the early part of the first semifinal, making his turn in second place, at 22.62 seconds, but finishing fifth. In the final, Cielo adopted a different tactic, turning third, slower (22.74 seconds) than in the semifinals, and saving energy for the finish, which resulted in his winning the bronze medal and breaking the South American record with a time of 47.67 seconds (tied with American swimmer Jason Lezak). Alain Bernard won the gold medal and Eamon Sullivan won the silver. Shortly after winning the bronze medal, Cielo gave a statement to the Brazilian press, stating categorically: "Now I'm going to win the 50m". In the 50-metre freestyle event, Cielo set the Olympic record, that Alexander Popov had set in the 1992 Summer Olympics, during the heats (21.47 seconds, equaling Garrett Weber-Gale's Americas record) and in the semifinals (21.34 seconds). He lowered this further in the finals, again breaking the Olympic record with a time of 21.30 seconds, winning the gold medal and missing the world record by 0.02 seconds. With this, he became the first Brazilian Olympic swimming champion. Until Cielo's Olympic gold, the best Brazilian Olympic swimming result had been obtained by Ricardo Prado, who won the silver medal in the 400-metre individual medley at the 1984 Summer Olympics, and previously Gustavo Borges, who won the silver medal in the 100-metre freestyle at the 1992 Summer Olympics and in the 200-metre freestyle at the 1996 Summer Olympics.

After the Olympics, in October, in the first stage of the 2008 FINA Swimming World Cup, held in Belo Horizonte, Brazil, Cielo equaled the short-course South American record in the 50-metre freestyle, with a time of 21.32 seconds.

=== 2009 ===
Cielo trained at the Esporte Clube Pinheiros until 2009. He worked with Coach Albertinho at Pinheiros from 16 to 18 years old. In May 2009, Cielo broke the South American record in the 50-metre butterfly, but the record lasted only a few minutes. Cielo achieved a time of 23.49 seconds competing for the Maria Lenk Trophy but, in the next heat, Guilherme Roth swam a time of 23.46 seconds and established a new continental record. In the final, Cielo regained the record with a time of 23.42 seconds. In the same competition, he broke the South American record for the 100-metre freestyle, with a time of 47.60 seconds.

At the 2009 US World Championship Trials in Indianapolis, Cielo swam a time of 21.14 seconds in the B final of the 50-metre freestyle (the A final was limited to Americans). His time was the fastest time among all competitors, and set a new Americas record. It was also the 2nd fastest time in the event's history, 0.20 seconds behind his former training partner Frédérick Bousquet's world record.

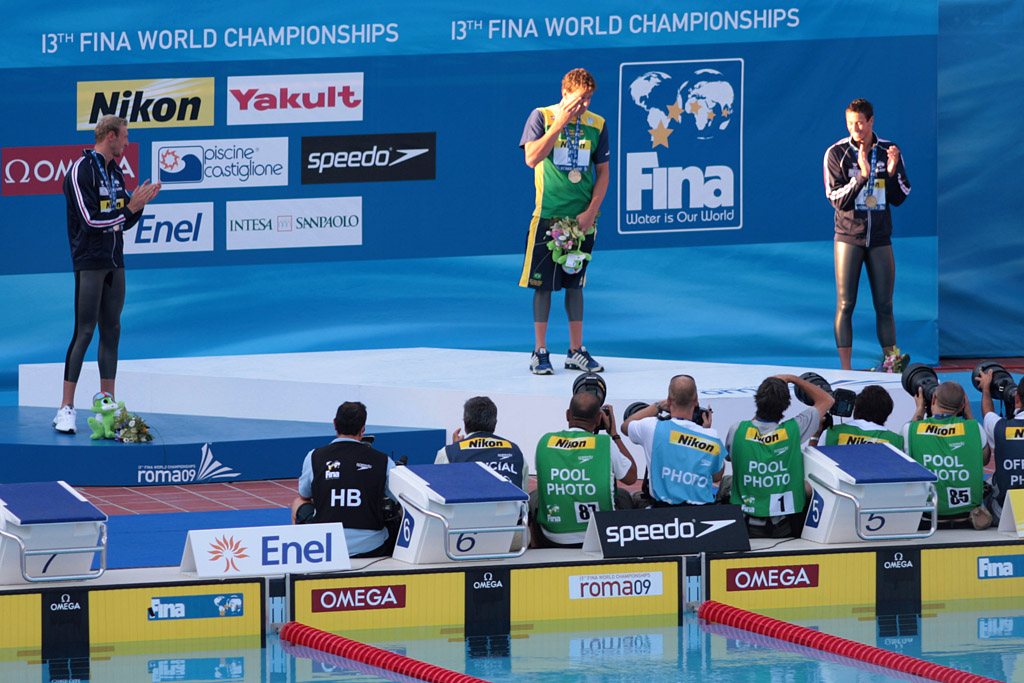
Cielo broke the world record in the 100-metre freestyle at the 2009 World Aquatics Championships in Rome.

At the 2009 World Aquatics Championships in Rome, Cielo led the Brazilian 4×100-metre freestyle relay team to a 4th-place finish, along with Nicolas Oliveira, Guilherme Roth and Fernando Silva. In this event, he opened with a time of 47.39 seconds in the heats (a South American and Championship record) and a time of 47.09 seconds in the final, only 0.04 seconds from beating Eamon Sullivan's world record, and earning the second fastest time in the history of the 100-metre freestyle. In the 100-metre freestyle final, the Brazilian swimmer won the gold medal, defeating the Olympic champion Alain Bernard and breaking the world record with a time of 46.91 seconds, entering into the select pantheon of swimmers who won an Olympic gold, a World Championships gold, and a World Record. In the 50-metre freestyle final, Cielo defeated world record holder Frédérick Bousquet and won the gold medal with a time of 21.08 seconds, beating the competition record and the Americas record. Cielo became the third swimmer to achieve this feat in a single World Championship, after Anthony Ervin and Alexander Popov. Popov, Ervin, and Cielo each won Olympic and World Championship gold medals in the 50-metre freestyle in succession. When he finished the 4×100-metre medley, a contest where the first four relays in the race beat the US world record from the 2008 Summer Olympics, Cielo led Brazil to fourth place, along with Guilherme Guido, Henrique Barbosa and Gabriel Mangabeira, very close to winning the event's bronze and silver medals. His two gold medals at the World Championships led Brazil to the best performance in the history of the competition.

Cielo became the sixth Brazilian to achieve a world record in the long course, after Maria Lenk, Manuel dos Santos, José Fiolo, Ricardo Prado and Felipe França. It was the 13th world record made by a Brazilian swimmer.

On 18 December 2009, in São Paulo, Cielo broke the world record in the 50-metre freestyle, with a time of 20.91 seconds, at a championship hosted at Esporte Clube Pinheiros, his club in Brazil and where he had trained since 2003. It was the last official event allowing the use of super-suits in Brazil. A day later, he established the best time in the world, 1:26.12, in the 4×50-metre freestyle. The time was not considered a world record because this event is not part of the Olympics and World Championships.

=== 2010 ===
In 2010, Cielo changed clubs. He began the year receiving proposals from several teams in Brazil and elsewhere, but he chose to sign with Flamengo, under the chairmanship of former swimmer Patrícia Amorim, with a mission to contribute to the strengthening of swimming in Rio de Janeiro and other big Brazilian clubs. On 27 June 2010, he became the first swimmer in the world to break the Alexander Popov's world record in the 50-metre freestyle, without the help of technological swimsuits. He earned a time of 21.55 seconds, wearing only shorts, and won the Paris Open.

At the 2010 Pan Pacific Swimming Championships in Irvine, California, the Brazilian started by winning a gold in the 50-metre butterfly, beating the championship record. He hoped to also win gold in the 50-metre and 100-metre freestyle, but settled for silver in the 50-metre freestyle, and bronze in the 100-metre freestyle. When interviewed after the contest, Cielo said there could have been some flaw in his training program, resulting in a lack of stamina.

In September 2010, at the Jose Finkel Trophy, Cielo broke the short-course South American record for the 100-metre freestyle twice: first with a time of 46.13 seconds in the semifinal, and again with 45.87 seconds in the final.

At the December 2010 FINA Short Course World Swimming Championships in Dubai, Cielo, along with Nicholas Santos, Nicolas Oliveira and Marcelo Chierighini, won the bronze medal in the 4×100-metre freestyle, with a time of 3:05.74, setting a South American record and leaving behind the US team. In the 50-metre freestyle, Cielo twice broke the Americas record, earning 20.61 seconds in the heats, and winning the gold medal with a time of 20.51 seconds, a new Americas and Championship record, just 0.21 seconds slower than Roland Schoeman's world record. (Schoeman broke the world record using super-suit technology in 2009, when it was still allowed, while Cielo made his time without a super-suit.) His time became the third fastest of any ever achieved in the event, and a world textile best. In the 100-metre freestyle, Cielo also won the gold with a time of 45.74 seconds, a South American and championship record. With that, Cielo, at 23 years old, managed to unify the world titles of the two events: the 50-metre and the 100-metre freestyle in both the long and short courses. Completing his participation in the Short Course Worlds, Cielo led the Brazilian 4×100-metre medley relay team of Guilherme Guido, Felipe França Silva and Kaio de Almeida to win the bronze medal. The team broke the South American record with a time of 3:23.12.

=== 2011 ===
In May 2011, Cielo tested positive for the banned substance furosemide. Furosemide is a diuretic often used to help lose weight but it is also a masking agent which may hide the presence of other drugs. Cielo was one of four Brazilian swimmers who tested positive for the substance and was given a warning by Brazil's national swimming federation. Cielo claimed the positive drug test was a result of a cross-contamination. FINA appealed Cielo's case to the Court of Arbitration for Sport (CAS) and CAS upheld the warning for Cielo. CAS claimed that a caffeine supplement had been contaminated, causing the failed drug test. CAS was convinced that the furosemide found was not aimed at improving athletic performance or masking the use of some other performance-enhancing substance.

The CAS decision allowed Cielo to compete in the 2011 World Aquatics Championships in Shanghai, as he was cleared to compete three days before the competition began. This generated controversy among other competitors. Notably, Kenyan swimmer Jason Dunford flashed a "thumbs down" to the audience after Cielo's win in the 50-metre butterfly (Dunford finished seventh in the race).

Further controversy followed when Cielo made a slit-eyed gesture into the cameras after winning the 50 metre freestyle. The gesture was called "insensitive and offensive" towards the Chinese hosts.

At the 2011 World Aquatics Championships in Shanghai, Cielo won the gold medal in the 50-metre butterfly with a time of 23.10 seconds. Days later in the same competition, Cielo won a second gold medal in the 50-metre freestyle. In the 100-metre freestyle, Cielo earned a time of 48.01 seconds to finish in fourth place, one-hundredth of a second away from winning a bronze and six hundredths away from silver. The winner of the 100-metre freestyle was James Magnussen, an Australian who surprised the world a few days earlier with his time of 47.49 seconds in the 4×100-metre freestyle.

At the 2011 Pan American Games in Guadalajara, Cielo won four gold medals: in the 50 and 100-metre freestyle, and in the 4×100-metre freestyle and medley relay. He broke the Pan-American record in the 50-metre freestyle (21.58 seconds), the 100-metre freestyle (47.84 seconds), and in the 4×100-metre freestyle (3:14.65). His highlight for the competition was his time of 47.84 seconds in the 100-metre freestyle, the best time of his life without the use of a technological swimsuit.

In 2011, Cielo announced the creation of P.R.O. 16 – the "Going for 2016 Gold" Project. The initiative, designed to serve as Brazilian swimming's "elite squad", gathered Cielo, who would be leading the project, and six other swimmers – André Schultz, Leonardo de Deus, Nicholas Santos, Henrique Rodrigues, Tales Cerdeira and Vinicius Waked – all selected for potential medals in the 2016 Summer Olympics, in Rio de Janeiro. The idea would be to prepare the swimmers also for the main competition in the coming years. For two years, the innovative program, which proposed a system of high level training without relying on the infrastructure of big clubs, worked. But the difficulty of finding sponsors and the change of attitude of the clubs made the training group lose almost all its members. In 2013, Cielo was the only one left in the project, but highlighted its continuity, with changes in the project, receiving new members and getting new sponsors.

=== 2012 ===
On 25 April 2012, participating in the Maria Lenk Trophy in Rio de Janeiro, Cielo finished the 50-metre freestyle race in 21.38 seconds, earning the best time of the year in the event, and getting close to the best time in the event's history without using super-suits (21.36 seconds made by Frédérick Bousquet). A day later, he broke the Americas record for the 50-metre butterfly, with a time of 22.76 seconds beating the previous record, 22.87 seconds set by Nicholas Santos. It was a world textile best.

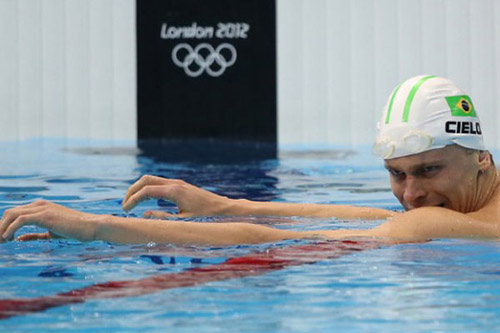
Cielo at the 2012 Summer Olympics

At the 2012 Summer Olympics in London, Cielo finished 6th in the 100-metre freestyle, with a time of 47.92 seconds. The gold went to Nathan Adrian (47.52 seconds), followed by James Magnussen (47.53 seconds) and Brent Hayden (47.80 seconds). At the 50-metre mark, Cielo had the fastest split with a time of 22.60 seconds. In the 50-metre freestyle, where Cielo was the favorite to win gold, he ranked first in the semifinal, tied with Cullen Jones, with a time of 21.54 seconds. But in the final, he finished with a worse time than in the semifinal round, but managed to earn his third Olympic medal, a bronze, with a time of 21.59 seconds. The winner was Frenchman Florent Manaudou with a time of 21.34 seconds. Cielo's Olympic record of 21.30 seconds set in 2008 still held.

On 20 August, at the Jose Finkel Trophy in São Paulo, Cielo broke the short-course South American record in the 4×50-metre freestyle, with a time of 1:25.28.

At the end of the year, Cielo had an operation on both knees. Since 2007, the Brazilian had suffered patellar tendinopathy in both knees. Cielo was in constant pain, and the injury started to hurt his training and performance. The nadir was at the 2012 London Olympics, where Cielo was already struggling at the start. In September, he had an operation on the patellar tendon. "He had a chronic wear of the patellar tendon, which generated an inflammatory process that bothered him greatly. In London, Cielo has lost much of the leg muscles because this inflammatory process. He came to lose two inches in circumference on each leg for a period of ten days. As the inflamed knee, he lost output quality. An output was once the best in the world ended up much like those of their adversaries" said Gustavo Magliocca, Cielo's doctor.

=== 2013 ===
The new leadership of Flamengo, elected in 2012, decided not to follow Amorim's plans, and Cielo left the club in 2013. In February 2013, American Scott Goodrich (who went 19.29) took over Cielo's training. Under a contract until the end of 2016, Albertinho was the next head coach of the group.

In April 2013, Cielo confirmed his place in the 2013 World Aquatics Championships, in Barcelona, in the 50-metre freestyle, with the second best time in the world of the year: 21.57 seconds. He also qualified for the 50-metre butterfly. Due to his operation in both knees, Cielo did not compete in the 100-metre freestyle and the Brazilian relays. In the competition, Cielo became two-time World Champion of the 50-metre butterfly. The semifinals were the strongest stage of the race, with five swimmers earning times below 23 seconds. Cielo went to the final in second place with a time of 22.86 seconds, behind his compatriot Nicholas Santos. In the final, the athletes' performance was not the same, but Cielo showed more consistency and won the gold with a time of 23.01 seconds. In the 50-metre freestyle, Cielo reached the final with the third fastest time, 21.60 seconds, tied with Nathan Adrian. Florent Manaudou and Anthony Ervin qualified for the final as favorites, with strong times of 21.37 and 21.42 seconds respectively, in the second semifinal. But, in a final with a high technical level in which three Olympic champions (Manaudou, Cielo and Ervin) were competing, Cielo earned the best time of his life without a high-tech suit (and an unofficial world fastest time swum in textile), 21.32 seconds, becoming the first three-time World Champion of the event. Manaudou and Ervin did not even reach the podium. It was Cielo's sixth gold medal in individual events at the World Championships. With this result, Cielo overcame Alexander Popov and became the sprinter with more individual golds in World Championship history. Only four male swimmers have won more gold individual medals in World Championships than Cielo: Aaron Peirsol (7), Grant Hackett (7), Ryan Lochte (9) and Michael Phelps (15). Regarding his gold medal in the 50-metre freestyle, Cielo assured his fans that it was the most important gold of his career, declaring at the World Championships: "It was certainly different from all others. Each medal has a different feeling. This was the most special of my life. From London, all I had to overcome... it was very exciting". Cielo's results were considered a "redemption", because of low expectations entering the 2013 World Championships due to the troubled period following the London Olympics, when he underwent surgery on both knees, left his club and changed his coach.

=== 2014 ===
On 23 April 2014, participating in the Maria Lenk Trophy competition in São Paulo, Cielo finished the 50-metre freestyle race in 21.39 seconds, earning the best time of the year in the event. Two days later, he won the 50-metre butterfly with a time of 23.01, also a world-leading time. On 26 April, he won the 100-metre freestyle with a time of 48.13, third in the world rankings behind only James Magnussen (47.59) and Cameron McEvoy (47.65).

On 3 September 2014, participating in the José Finkel Trophy (short course) competition in Guaratinguetá, Cielo finished the 50-metre freestyle race in 20.68 seconds, earning the best time of the year in the event. Three days later, he won the 100-metre freestyle with a time of 46.08, also a world-leading time. On 5 September, he finished second in the 50-metre butterfly with a time of 22.46, third in the world rankings behind only Chad Le Clos and Nicholas Santos

At the 2014 FINA World Swimming Championships (25 m) in Doha, Qatar, Cielo won three gold and two bronze medals, into the best Brazilian participation of all time, where the country won the competition for the first time. In the Men's 4 × 50 metre medley relay, formed by Cielo, Felipe França, Nicholas Santos and Guilherme Guido, considered the "Dream Team" by Cielo himself (formed only by medalists or world champions in their respective individual events), Brazil won the gold shattering the world record with a time of 1:30.51. In the Men's 50 metre freestyle, Cielo went to the final in first place with a time of 20.80 seconds, but in the final, he had problems with his start and at the turn, finishing with a time of 20.88 and getting the bronze. His rival, the French Florent Manaudou, won the gold beating the world record. Cielo also helped the Brazilian 4 × 50 metre mixed freestyle relay (formed by Cielo, João de Lucca, Etiene Medeiros and Larissa Oliveira) to win the bronze medal, beating the South American record with a time of 1:29.17, only 4 hundredths slower than Russia, which won the silver medal. In this race, Cielo opened with a time of 20.65, showing that could have done a better time in the 50-metre freestyle final. On the last day of the competition, Cielo won the rematch against Manaudou, in the Men's 100 metre freestyle, where Manaudou was also favorite, but was defeated by Cielo, who won the gold with a time of 45.75. Cielo also closed the competition with a flourish, leading the Brazilian quartet to an unprecedented gold in the traditional Men's 4 × 100 metre medley relay, with a time of 3:21.14, South American record. Cielo took the relay in fourth place and surpassed everyone with an incredible split time of 44.67.

=== 2015 ===
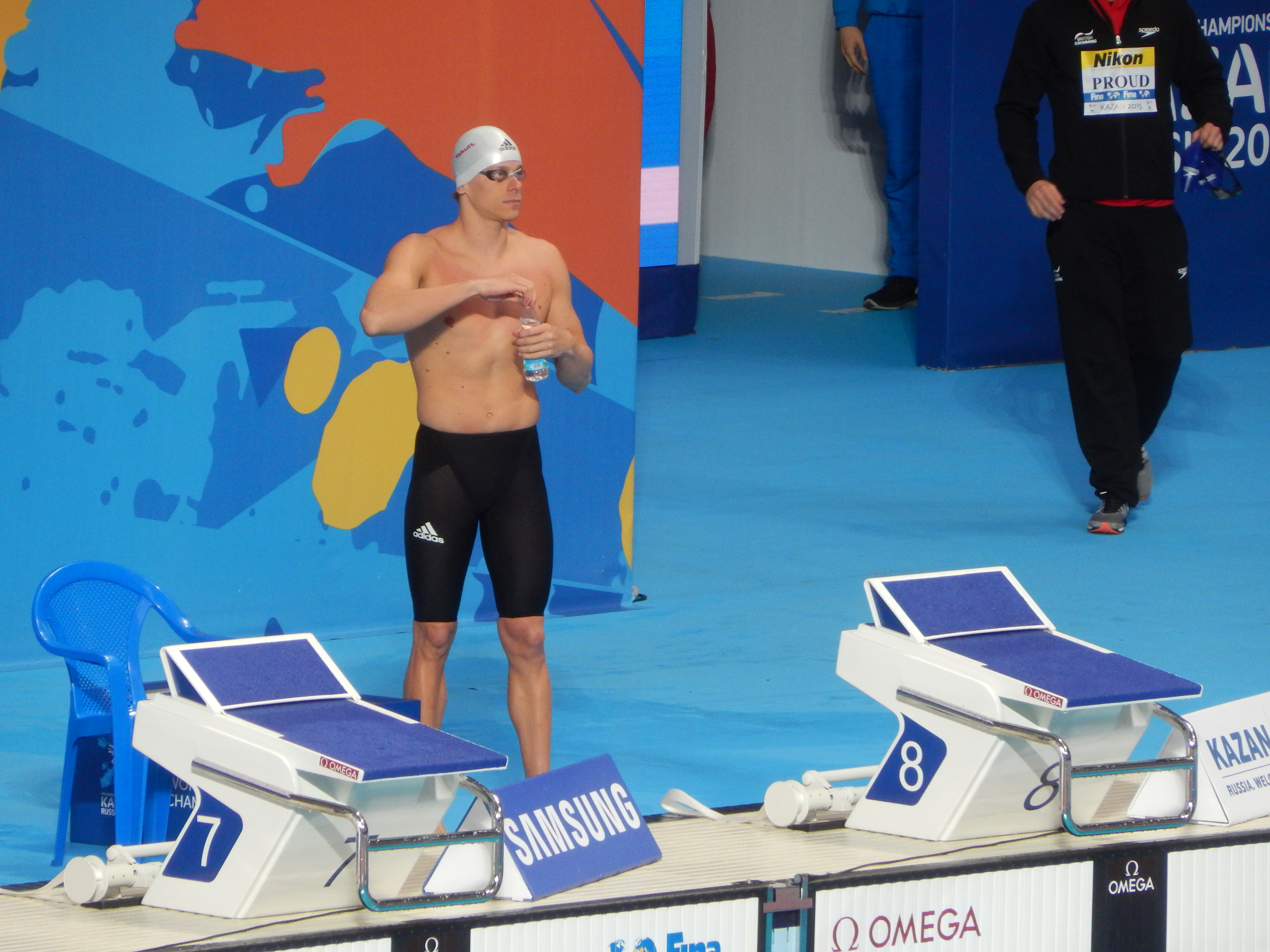
Cielo in the 50-metre butterfly final at the 2015 World Aquatics Championships

Cielo didn't participate in the 2015 Pan American Games in Toronto, Ontario, Canada, targeting the World Championships, who would happen after some days.

At the 2015 World Aquatics Championships in Kazan, Brazil finished 4th in the Men's 4 × 100 metre freestyle, in a relay composed by Bruno Fratus, Marcelo Chierighini, Matheus Santana and João de Lucca. César Cielo didn't swim in the final – despite being a participant in the championship, he was suffering with shoulder pain. According to the doctor of the Brazilian Aquatic Sports Confederation (CBDA), Gustavo Magliocca, Cielo had an inflammation of the supraspinatus tendon. The injury is considered common in the athletes, and it was being treated with physiotherapy. Due to the problem, in the Men's 50 metre butterfly, Cielo struggled though the heats and the semifinals, but slumped to 6th in the final. On 5 August, Cielo left the competition due to the increase of his injury.

=== 2016 ===
In April 2016, at the Maria Lenk Trophy, held in Rio de Janeiro, Cielo failed to qualify for the 2016 Summer Olympics. In the 100-metre freestyle, Cielo swam 48.97 in the heats and chose not to participate in the final. Thus, Cielo finished with the seventh time in Brazil, and was officially off the 4 × 100 free. In the 50-metre freestyle, Cielo won the heats with 21.99, staying temporarily with the Brazil's second vacancy. However, in the final, Ítalo Duarte finished second, with a time of 21.82. Cielo finished third, with a time of 21.91. Brazil's Olympic vacancies were with Bruno Fratus and Ítalo Duarte.

=== 2017 ===
At the 2017 World Aquatics Championships in Budapest, in the Men's 4 × 100 metre freestyle relay, the Brazilian team composed by Cielo, Bruno Fratus, Marcelo Chierighini and Gabriel Santos achieved a historic result by winning the silver medal, the best Brazilian result of all time at World Championships in this race. Brazil beat the South American record of 2009, still in the super-suits era, with a time of 3:10.34, just 0.28 from the US team. The last medal of Brazil in this race, in Worlds, had been obtained in 1994. He also finished 8th in the Men's 50 metre freestyle.

=== 2018 ===
At the 2018 FINA World Swimming Championships (25 m) in Hangzhou, China, Cielo, along with Marcelo Chierighini, Matheus Santana and Breno Correia, won the bronze medal in the Men's 4 × 100 metre freestyle relay, with a time of 3:05.15, setting a South American record. With that, Cielo became the Brazilian athlete with more medals in World Championships at any sport, surpassing the sailor Robert Scheidt (18 medals against 17 of the sailor). He won another bronze medal in the Men's 4 × 50 metre medley relay, along with Guilherme Guido, Felipe Lima and Nicholas Santos. He also finished 5th in the Mixed 4 × 50 metre freestyle relay, and 7th in the Men's 50 metre freestyle. He chose not to swim the Men's 100 metre freestyle. These championships were the last elite event that Cielo participated in.

=== Life after swimming ===
In early 2021, Cielo ruled out trying for a spot at the Tokyo Olympics. In June 2021, he confirmed his participation as a commentator for TV Globo and SportTV for the Tokyo Games.

In 2023, Cielo was inducted into the International Swimming Hall of Fame.

Cielo represents Marcílio Dias, a multi-sports club that has soccer and swimming as some of its activities.

== Personal life ==
Cielo dated Priscila Machado, Miss Brasil 2011, for eight months. In October 2012, he was photographed with his new girlfriend, model Kelly Gisch. Cielo married Gisch, and their son, Thomas, was born in September 2015.

== Career best times ==
The Olympic record for the 50-metre freestyle, set by Cielo in Beijing 2008 (21.30), was broken in Tokyo 2020.

His time of 46.91 in the 100m freestyle only stopped being a world record in 2022, 13 years later, when David Popovici of Romania swam 46.86, and only stopped being a record for the Americas in 2025, 16 years later, when Jack Alexy of the USA swam 46.81.

=== Long course (50 metre pool) ===
Event	Time	Location	Date	Notes
50 m freestyle	20.91	São Paulo	18 December 2009	Former WR
100 m freestyle	46.91	Rome	30 July 2009	Former WR
50 m butterfly	22.76	Rio de Janeiro	26 April 2012	Former AM
4×50 m freestyle	1:26.12	São Paulo	19 December 2009	SA
4 × 100 m freestyle	3:10.34	Budapest	23 July 2017	SA
4 × 100 m medley	3:29.16	Rome	2 August 2009	SA

=== Short course (25 metre pool) ===
Event	Time	Location	Date	Notes
50 m freestyle	20.51	Dubai	17 December 2010	Former AM
100 m freestyle	45.74	Dubai	19 December 2010	Former SA
4×50 m freestyle	1:25.28	São Paulo	20 August 2012	SA
4 × 100 m freestyle	3:05.15	Hangzhou	11 December 2018	Former SA
4 × 200 m freestyle	7:06.09	Shanghai	6 April 2006	Former SA
4×50 m medley	1:30.51	Doha	4 December 2014	WR
4 × 100 m medley	3:21.14	Doha	7 December 2014	SA
4×50 m mixed freestyle	1:29.17	Doha	6 December 2014	SA

== Records progression ==
=== Long course (50 metre pool) ===
- 50m freestyle

Time	Date	Notes
22.09	30 March 2007	SA
21.84	22 July 2007	SA, CR
21.75	11 July 2008	SA
21.47	14 August 2008	AM, OR
21.34	14 August 2008	AM, OR
21.30	15 August 2008	AM, OR
21.14	9 July 2009	AM
21.08	1 August 2009	AM, CR
21.02	17 December 2009	AM
20.91	18 December 2009	WR

- 100m freestyle

Time	Date	Notes
48.61	15 December 2006	SA
48.51	29 March 2007	SA
48.49	16 February 2008	SA
48.34	6 April 2008	SA
47.91 (r)	11 August 2008	SA
47.67	14 August 2008	SA
47.60	10 May 2009	SA
47.39 (r)	26 July 2009	AM, CR
47.09 (r)	26 July 2009	AM, CR
46.91	30 July 2009	WR

r = relay lead-off

- 50m butterfly

Time	Date	Notes
23.49	7 May 2009	SA
23.42	8 May 2009	SA
22.76	26 April 2012	AM

- 4 × 100 m freestyle

Time	Date	Notes
3:17.03	25 March 2007	SA
3:15.90	20 July 2007	SA, CR
3:11.26	26 July 2009	SA, CR
3:10.80	26 July 2009	SA
3:10.34	23 July 2017	SA

- 4 × 100 m medley

Time	Date	Notes
3:35.81	22 July 2007	SA, CR
3:29.16	2 August 2009	SA

=== Short course (25 metre pool) ===
- 50m freestyle

Time	Date	Notes
21.32	12 October 2008	SA
20.61	16 December 2010	AM, CR
20.51	17 December 2010	AM, CR

- 100m freestyle

Time	Date	Notes
47.00	23 November 2007	SA
46.13	24 September 2010	SA
45.87	24 September 2010	SA
45.74	19 December 2010	SA, CR

- 4 × 100 m freestyle

Time	Date	Notes
3:05.74	15 December 2010	SA
3:05.15	11 December 2018	SA

- 4 × 200 m freestyle

Time	Date	Notes
7:06.09	6 April 2006	SA

- 4 × 100 m medley

Time	Date	Notes
3:33.02	11 October 2004	SA
3:23.12	19 December 2010	SA
3:21.14	7 December 2014	SA

== Honors and awards ==
Cielo has received the following awards:

- NCAA Swimmer of the Year: 2007, 2008.
- Prêmio Brasil Olímpico: 2008, 2009, 2011. In 2010 he was elected best swimmer of the year. Cielo competed for the Prêmio Brasil Olímpico award against Murilo Endres (volleyball) and Leandro Guilheiro (judo); Endres was elected the winner. In 2013 he was elected best swimmer of the year. Cielo competed for the Prêmio Brasil Olímpico award against Arthur Zanetti (artistic gymnastics) and Jorge Zarif (sailing); Zarif was elected the winner.
- Cielo was recognized by Época magazine as one of the 100 most influential Brazilians in 2008, 2009, 2011, 2013 and 2014
- Prêmio Faz Diferença ("Makes Difference" Award) – O Globo newspaper: 2009.
- Best Ibero-American athlete of 2009.
- Best athlete of the decade by "Sport Life" magazine.

== Achievements ==
=== Olympic Games ===
- Beijing Olympics (China) :
  - Men's 50 m freestyle gold medal (OR).
  - Men's 100 m freestyle bronze medal.
- London Olympics (England) :
  - Men's 50 m freestyle bronze medal.

=== FINA World Championships ===
- FINA Short Course World Championships 2004 in Indianapolis (United States) :
  - (silver) Men's 4 × 100 m freestyle relay silver medal.
- FINA World Championships 2009 in Rome (Italy) :
  - Men's 100 m freestyle gold medal (WR).
  - Men's 50 m freestyle gold medal (CR).
  - (4th) Men's 4 × 100 m freestyle relay.
  - (4th) Men's 4 × 100 m medley relay.
- FINA Short Course World Championships 2010 in Dubai (UAE):
  - Men's 100 m freestyle gold medal (CR).
  - Men's 50 m freestyle gold medal (CR).
  - (bronze) Men's 4 × 100 m freestyle relay bronze medal.
  - (bronze) Men's 4 × 100 m medley relay bronze medal.
- FINA World Championships 2011 in Shanghai (China) :
  - Men's 50 m butterfly gold medal.
  - Men's 50 m freestyle gold medal.
  - (4th) Men's 100 m freestyle.
- FINA World Championships 2013 in Barcelona (Spain) :
  - Men's 50 m butterfly gold medal.
  - Men's 50 m freestyle gold medal.
- FINA Short Course World Championships 2014 in Doha (Qatar):
  - Men's 100 m freestyle gold medal.
  - Men's 4×50 m medley relay gold medal (WR).
  - Men's 4 × 100 m medley relay gold medal.
  - Men's 50 m freestyle bronze medal.
  - (bronze) Men's 4×50 m mixed freestyle relay bronze medal.
- FINA World Championships 2017 in Budapest (Hungary) :
  - (silver) Men's 4 × 100 m freestyle relay silver medal.
- FINA Short Course World Championships 2018 in Hangzhou (China):
  - (bronze) Men's 4 × 100 m freestyle relay bronze medal.
  - (bronze) Men's 4×50 m medley relay bronze medal.

== See also ==
- List of world records in swimming
- List of Americas records in swimming
- List of South American records in swimming
- List of Brazilian records in swimming
- List of Olympic medalists in swimming (men)
- List of World Aquatics Championships medalists in swimming (men)
- List of World Swimming Championships (25 m) medalists (men)
- Swimming at the 2008 Summer Olympics
- Swimming at the 2012 Summer Olympics
- World record progression 50 metres freestyle
- World record progression 100 metres freestyle

Awards
Preceded by Thiago Pereira	Brazilian Sportsmen of the Year; 2008, 2009	Succeeded by Murilo Endres
Preceded by Murilo Endres	Brazilian Sportsmen of the Year; 2011	Succeeded by Arthur Zanetti
Records
Preceded by Frédérick Bousquet	Men's 50-metre freestyle world record-holder (long course); 18 December 2009 – 20 March 2026	Succeeded by Cameron McEvoy
Preceded by Eamon Sullivan	Men's 100-metre freestyle world record-holder (long course); 30 July 2009 – 13 August 2022	Succeeded by David Popovici
