= 2010 USA Swimming Championships =

American swimming tournament

The 2010 ConocoPhillips National Swimming Championships were held from August 3 until August 7, 2010 at the William Woollett Jr. Aquatics Center in Irvine, California.

== Men's events ==
Event	Gold		Silver		Bronze	
50 m freestyle	Nathan Adrian	21.70	Cullen Jones	21.97	Garrett Weber-Gale	22.21
100 m freestyle	Nathan Adrian	48.41	Ryan Lochte	48.83	Jason Lezak; Garrett Weber-Gale	48.96
200 m freestyle	Michael Phelps	1:45.61	Ryan Lochte	1:45.78	Peter Vanderkaay	1:46.84
400 m freestyle	Peter Vanderkaay	3:46.88	Michael Klueh	3:48.24	Charlie Houchin	3:48.30
1500 m freestyle	Chad La Tourette	14:55.39	Peter Vanderkaay	15:03.86	Sean Ryan	15:04.84
100 m backstroke	David Plummer	53.60	Aaron Peirsol	53.63	Nick Thoman	53.78
200 m backstroke	Ryan Lochte	1:55.58	Aaron Peirsol	1:56.28	Tyler Clary	1:56.36
100 m breaststroke	Michael Alexandrov	1:00.26	Mark Gangloff	1:00.42	Eric Shanteau	1:00.75
200 m breaststroke	Eric Shanteau	2:10.09	Scott Spann	2:12.26	Elliott Keefer	2:12.68
100 m butterfly	Michael Phelps	50.65	Tyler McGill	52.20	Timothy Phillips	52.41
200 m butterfly	Michael Phelps	1:56.00	Mark Dylla	1:57.08	Tyler Clary	1:57.32
200 m IM	Ryan Lochte	1:54.84	Michael Phelps	1:55.94	Tyler Clary	1:59.19
400 m IM	Ryan Lochte	4:09.98	Tyler Clary	4:14.12	Robert Margalis	4:15.62

== Women's events ==
Event	Gold		Silver		Bronze	
50 m freestyle	Kara Lynn Joyce	24.86	Madison Kennedy	25.15	Amanda Weir	25.29
100 m freestyle	Dana Vollmer	53.94	Jessica Hardy	54.14	Natalie Coughlin	54.34
200 m freestyle	Allison Schmitt	1:56.84	Dana Vollmer	1:56.93	Katie Hoff	1:57.50
400 m freestyle	Katie Hoff	4:05.50	Allison Schmitt	4:06.19	Chloe Sutton	4:06.33
800 m freestyle	Chloe Sutton	8:24.77	Kate Ziegler	8:28.14	Haley Anderson	8:32.80
100 m backstroke	Natalie Coughlin	1:00.14	Missy Franklin	1:00.39	Rachel Bootsma	1:00.40
200 m backstroke	Elizabeth Beisel	2:08.50	Missy Franklin	2:09.74	Morgan Scroggy	2:10.87
100 m breaststroke	Rebecca Soni	1:05.73	Annie Chandler	1:08.07	Micah Lawrence	1:08.48
200 m breaststroke	Rebecca Soni	2:21.60	Amanda Beard	2:26.50	Katy Freeman	2:26.67
100 m butterfly	Christine Magnuson	57.32	Dana Vollmer	57.45	Kathleen Hersey	58.15
200 m butterfly	Kathleen Hersey	2:07.00	Teresa Crippen	2:07.89	Mary Mohler	2:08.91
200 m IM	Ariana Kukors	2:10.54	Caitlin Leverenz	2:10.84	Morgan Scroggy	2:11.25
400 m IM	Caitlin Leverenz	4:35.60	Ariana Kukors	4:37.03	Katie Hoff	4:37.51
