= Geoffrey Raymond (disambiguation) =

Geoffrey Raymond is an American painter.

Geoffrey Raymond (or similar) may also refer to:

- Geoffrey Raymond, character in Alibi (play)
- Geoff Raymond, broadcaster
- Jeff Raymond, co-writer of You Don't Love Me Anymore (Eddie Rabbitt song)
