= Geoffrey Raymond =

American painter

- Born: October 6, 1953 (age 72); New York City
- Education: University of Virginia in Charlottesville.
- Known for: Painting

Geoffrey Raymond (born 6 October 1953) (Note: ———— (2019-10-06). "Ode on a Grecian Urn (With Apologies to Shelley)". Medium.) is an American painter. He is best known for painting embattled Wall Street CEOs, then exhibiting them in a public place and inviting pedestrians who pass by to annotate his work with Sharpies. His painting style is described as a Jackson Pollock/Chuck Close fusion. Because of the physical incorporation of public commentary on the face of his works, his Wall Street series expands the notion of traditional portraiture and becomes both painted depictions and historical documentation of the 2008 financial crisis.

Raymond was born in New York City and grew up in Fairfax, Virginia. He attended college at the University of Virginia, where he studied both art and medieval English, receiving a Bachelor's degree in English in 1976.

He first started painting Wall Street figures in 2006 when he painted a portrait of New York Stock Exchange CEO Richard Grasso during the NYSE compensation controversy.

The first time he encouraged public annotation was in 2007, when he painted a portrait of News Corporation CEO Rupert Murdoch and exhibited it in front of the Dow Jones headquarters downtown. Since then, he has painted a wide range of subjects, including former New York Governor Eliot Spitzer, former Bear Stearns CEO Jimmy Cayne, former Lehman Brothers CEO Richard Fuld, former AIG CEO Hank Greenberg, Federal Reserve Chairman Ben Bernanke, former Treasury Secretary Henry Paulson, and others. In 2011 he exhibited a second portrait of Murdoch and displayed it for comment outside News Corp headquarters in Midtown Manhattan New York. (Note: Prodhan, Georgina (2011-08-09). "Insight: Rupert Murdoch's dynastic dream slips from his grasp". Reuters. London.)

Raymond currently resides in Troy, NY and New York City.
