= Jimmy Feigen =

American competition swimmer

Personal information
- National team: United States
- Born: James Feigen; September 26, 1989 (age 37) Hilo, Hawaii, U.S.
- Height: 6 ft 5 in (1.96 m)
- Weight: 216 lb (98 kg)

Sport
- Sport: Swimming
- Strokes: Freestyle
- Club: San Antonio Wave
- College team: University of Texas
Medal record
Men's swimming
Representing the United States
Olympic Games
Gold medal – first place	2016 Rio de Janeiro	4×100 m freestyle
Silver medal – second place	2012 London	4×100 m freestyle
World Championships (LC)
Silver medal – second place	2013 Barcelona	100 m freestyle
Silver medal – second place	2013 Barcelona	4×100 m freestyle
World Championships (SC)
Gold medal – first place	2012 Istanbul	4×100 m freestyle
Silver medal – second place	2014 Doha	4×50 m freestyle
Silver medal – second place	2014 Doha	4×100 m medley
Bronze medal – third place	2014 Doha	4×100 m freestyle
Summer Universiade
Gold medal – first place	2011 Shenzhen	100 m freestyle
Gold medal – first place	2011 Shenzhen	4×100 m freestyle
Silver medal – second place	2011 Shenzhen	4×100 m medley

James Feigen (born September 26, 1989) is an American former competition swimmer who specializes in freestyle events. He won a gold medal for the 4x100-meter freestyle relay for the 2016 Summer Olympics. Previously, he won a silver medal as a member of the second-place U.S. team in the 4×100-meter freestyle relay at the 2012 Summer Olympics.

== Personal life ==
Feigen was born in Hilo, Hawaii. He graduated from Winston Churchill High School in San Antonio, Texas in 2008, and swam for the Churchill Chargers high school swim team. He held the high school national record (short course yards) in the 100-yard freestyle (43.05) and the 50-yard freestyle (19.49). Feigen was the Texas UIL Class 5A state champion in the 50-yard freestyle from 2006 to 2008. Feigen was the National Boys' High School Swimmer of the Year in 2008.

=== Detention during 2016 Olympics ===
On the morning of August 14, teammate Ryan Lochte claimed that he, Feigen, Gunnar Bentz, and Jack Conger were robbed after four men forced them out of their taxi at gunpoint. A judge in Brazil issued a search and seizure warrant for Lochte and Feigen; Feigen subsequently contacted the authorities, and said he would make a public statement when the matter was settled. Civil Police of Rio de Janeiro concluded that the athletes were not robbed, but instead had been involved in an incident at a gas station in Barra da Tijuca, west of the city. This investigation found that the swimmers stopped at a gas station near Casa França, where they were involved in a confrontation with security guards regarding alleged vandalism the swimmers had caused in a bathroom while intoxicated. The two security guards were later discovered to be prison guards from a neighboring district. Further investigation revealed the swimmers never entered a bathroom. The only vandalism found was a framed advertisement which Lochte had torn from the wall. They also claimed that the swimmers had already paid in cash 100 reais ($31) and $20 in U.S. currency as compensation for objects from the bathroom which were damaged, such as a soap holder, a mirror, and a "Please Do Not Enter" sign. This report by the Rio Police department was subsequently refuted through witness statements as well as a USA Today article which found no such vandalism ever occurred.

According to anonymous police sources, Conger and Bentz told the police that Lochte's story was fabricated; but Jack Conger later confirmed they were confronted by 2 armed security men where one pointed a gun at Conger. The Associated Press reported that Conger and Bentz "refuted Lochte's claim that the group was held up by armed assailants." Feigen agreed to pay a fine of approximately $10,800 to a Brazilian charity in order to get his passport back. USA Today reported that Feigen left Brazil on August 19 after his passport was released and the fine was paid; just before he left, the local prosecution made an appeal to increase the fine to $47,000. On August 24, 2016, Feigen released a statement apologizing for the "serious distraction" he and three teammates caused at a gas station during the Rio Olympics, saying he omitted facts in his statement to police.

== College career ==
He received an athletic scholarship to attend the University of Texas at Austin, where he swam for coach Eddie Reese's Texas Longhorns swimming and diving team in National Collegiate Athletic Association (NCAA) competition from 2009 to 2012. During his four-year college career, he received seventeen All-American honors, and won NCAA national championships in the 50-yard freestyle, 100-yard freestyle, and 4x100-yard freestyle relay events in 2012.

== International career ==
=== 2008–2009 ===
At the 2008 U.S. Olympic Trials, Feigen placed 28th in the 50-meter freestyle (22.86) and 40th in the 100-meter freestyle (50.34).

Feigen barely missed spots on the 2009 World Championship team when he finished seventh in the 100-meter freestyle (48.46) and fifth in the 50-meter freestyle (21.77) at the USA Swimming National Championships. However, because of his results at Nationals, he was named to USA Swimming's National Team in the 50-meter freestyle.

=== 2011 ===
At the 2011 Summer Universiade in Shenzhen, Feigen earned the first international medal of his career, a gold, in the 4×100-meter freestyle relay with Tim Phillips, Kohlton Norys and Kohlton Norys. As the leadoff leg, Fiegen had a split of 49.27 and the U.S. team won the gold with a time of 3:15.84. In the 100-meter freestyle, Feigen won the gold in a time of 49.26, becoming the first American man to win the event since 1993. In the 4×100-meter medley relay, Fiegen earned a silver medal with Rex Tullius, George Klein, and Tim Phillips. Swimming the freestyle leg, Fiegen had a split of 49.05.

=== 2012 Summer Olympics ===
At the 2012 U.S. Olympic Trials in Omaha, Nebraska, the qualifying meet for the 2012 Olympics, Feigen made the U.S. Olympic team for the first time by finishing fifth in the 100-meter freestyle with a time of 48.84 seconds, which qualified him to swim in the 4×100-meter freestyle as a member of the U.S. relay team. Although his final time was faster than his swim in the heats (49.29), it was significantly slower than what he posted in the semi-finals (48.48). Feigen also competed in the 50-meter freestyle, and finished fifth in the final with a time of 21.93.

At the 2012 Summer Olympics in London, Feigen swam for the second-place U.S. team in the preliminary heats of the 4×100-meter freestyle relay and earned a silver medal when the U.S. team placed second in the final. Teaming with Matt Grevers, Ricky Berens and Jason Lezak, Feigen swam the lead off leg and recorded a time of 48.49 seconds.

=== 2013 World Championships ===
At the 2013 U.S. National Championships, Feigen qualified to swim at the 2013 World Aquatics Championships in Barcelona by placing second in the 100-meter freestyle with a time of 48.24. Feigen also competed in the 50-meter freestyle and tied for fourth place with a time of 21.88.

In his first event at the World Championships, Feigen combined with Nathan Adrian, Ryan Lochte, and Anthony Ervin in the 4×100-meter freestyle relay, with the team finishing behind France. Swimming the anchor leg, Feigen recorded a split of 48.23, and the team finished with a final time of 3:11.44.

Feigen advanced to the 100-meter freestyle final as the second seed by posting 48.07 in the semi-finals. In the final, Feigen won a surprise silver in a personal-best time of 47.82, only 0.11 seconds behind winner James Magnussen and out-touching Nathan Adrian by 0.02 seconds. For Feigen, it was his first time breaking 48 seconds in the event.

=== 2016 Summer Olympics ===
Feigen competed in the 2016 Summer Olympics, winning a gold medal by swimming in the preliminary rounds of the Men's 4x100 meter freestyle relay. After the competition, Feigen became embroiled in the Lochte-gate controversy, in which he may have committed public urination and committed minor vandalism. Feigen was accused of filing a misleading police report and ultimately fined by Brazilian authorities. In order to be charged with a misleading police report, a misdemeanor in Brazil, you must seek out the police to file the report. Feigen was confronted by Rio de Janeiro police and told to give a statement. As such, he was not guilty of filing a misleading report. Due to concerns for his safety, Feigen was advised to pay the fine in order to leave the country as quickly as possible in order to avoid a lengthy court process in Rio de Janeiro.

== See also ==
- List of Olympic medalists in swimming (men)
- List of United States records in swimming
- List of University of Texas at Austin alumni
