= Ricky Berens =

American swimmer (born 1988)

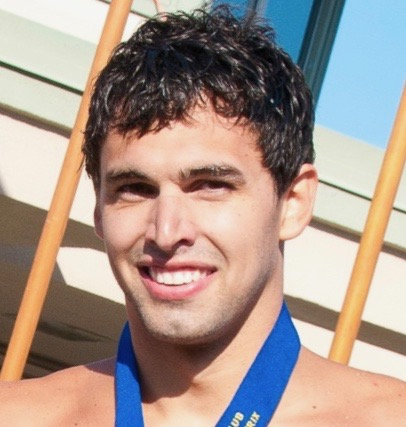
- Berens in 2010

Personal information
- Full name: Richard Berens
- National team: United States
- Born: April 21, 1988 (age 38) Charlotte, North Carolina, U.S.
- Height: 6 ft 3 in (191 cm)
- Weight: 190 lb (86 kg)

Sport
- Sport: Swimming
- Strokes: Freestyle
- Club: Trojan Swim Club
- College team: University of Texas
- Coach: Eddie Reese (U. Texas); Dave Salo (Trojan Swim Club)
Medal record
Men's swimming
Representing the United States
Event	1st	2nd	3rd
Olympic Games	2	1	0
World Championships (LC)	4	1	0
World Championships (SC)	0	1	0
Pan American Games	1	2	0
Pan Pacific Championships	1	0	0
Total	8	5	0
Olympic Games
Gold medal – first place	2008 Beijing	4×200 m freestyle
Gold medal – first place	2012 London	4×200 m freestyle
Silver medal – second place	2012 London	4×100 m freestyle
World Championships (LC)
Gold medal – first place	2009 Rome	4×100 m freestyle
Gold medal – first place	2009 Rome	4×200 m freestyle
Gold medal – first place	2011 Shanghai	4×200 m freestyle
Gold medal – first place	2013 Barcelona	4×200 m freestyle
Silver medal – second place	2013 Barcelona	4×100 m freestyle
World Championships (SC)
Silver medal – second place	2010 Dubai	4×200 m freestyle
Pan American Games
Gold medal – first place	2007 Rio de Janeiro	4×100 m medley
Silver medal – second place	2007 Rio de Janeiro	4×100 m freestyle
Silver medal – second place	2007 Rio de Janeiro	4×200 m freestyle
Pan Pacific Championships
Gold medal – first place	2010 Irvine	4×200 m freestyle
Representing the Texas Longhorns
Event	1st	2nd	3rd
NCAA Championships	2	5	2
Total	2	5	2
By race
Event	1st	2nd	3rd
200 y freestyle	0	0	1
200 y medley	0	1	1
4×100 y freestyle	0	2	0
4×200 y freestyle	2	1	0
4×100 y medley	0	1	0
Total	2	5	2
NCAA Championships
Gold medal – first place	2009 College Station	4×200 y freestyle
Gold medal – first place	2010 Columbus	4×200 y freestyle
Silver medal – second place	2007 Minneapolis	4×100 y medley
Silver medal – second place	2008 Federal Way	200 y medley
Silver medal – second place	2008 Federal Way	4×200 y freestyle
Silver medal – second place	2009 College Station	4×100 y freestyle
Silver medal – second place	2010 Columbus	4×100 y freestyle
Bronze medal – third place	2009 College Station	200 y freestyle
Bronze medal – third place	2009 College Station	200 y medley

Richard Berens (born April 21, 1988) is an American former competition swimmer, two-time Olympic gold medalist, world champion, and current world record-holder. As a member of the U.S. national team, he holds the world record in the 4×200-meter freestyle relay (long course). He competed in the 4×100-meter and 4×200-meter freestyle relay events, as well as the individual 200-meter freestyle at the 2012 Summer Olympics.

== Early years ==
Berens was born in Charlotte, North Carolina. He attended South Mecklenburg High School, where he won four NCHSAA 4A state championships, two in the 100 butterfly and two in the 200 IM. He was also the 4A swimming MVP in 2005 and 2006.

Following high school, Berens attended the University of Texas at Austin, and swam for coach Eddie Reese's Texas Longhorns swimming and diving team from 2007 to 2010. During his collegiate career at Texas, Berens was a 20-time All-American, member of two NCAA champion relay teams, and key contributor to the Longhorns 2010 NCAA team title. He graduated from the University of Texas with a bachelor's degree in finance in 2010, and relocated to Los Angeles shortly thereafter to train with coach Dave Salo at Trojan Aquatics.

== International career ==
At the 2007 Pan American Games, Berens won a gold medal in the 4×100-meter medley relay, and silver medals in both the 4×100-meter freestyle and 4×200-meter freestyle relays.

== 2008 Olympics ==
At the 2008 Summer Olympics, Berens won the gold medal in the men's 4×200-meter freestyle relay with Michael Phelps, Ryan Lochte, and Peter Vanderkaay, setting a new world record of 6:58.56. Berens swam the third leg in a relay split time of 1:46.29. Berens was the only member of the finals team to swim in the preliminary heats, posting a time of 1:45.47, just faster than Klete Keller's 1:45.51, to be selected to swim in the final.

=== 2009 World Aquatics Championships ===
Berens swam the third leg of the 4×100-meter freestyle preliminaries at the 2009 World Championships in Rome and earned a gold medal when the U.S. team placed first in the final. Berens also swam in both the preliminaries and final of the 4×200-meter freestyle, which won gold. In the final, Berens swam the second leg in 1:44.13, the second fastest split from anyone in the event.

Berens was also a part of the winning U.S. 4×200-meter freestyle relay teams at the 2010 Pan Pacific Swimming Championships and the 2011 World Championships.

At the 2011 Duel in the Pool, a short course meet featuring the United States and European "All-Stars", Berens won both the 100-meter and 200-meter freestyle events.

== 2012 London Olympics ==
At the 2012 United States Olympic Trials, the qualifying meet for the 2012 Olympics, Berens made his second Olympic team by finishing fourth in the 100-meter freestyle and third in the 200-meter freestyle, qualifying him to swim in the 4×100-meter freestyle relay and the 4×200-meter freestyle relay, respectively. Although Berens did not qualify to swim in any individual events, Bob Bowman, Michael Phelps's coach, revealed on Twitter that Phelps, who came in first in the 200-meter freestyle, would be scratching the race from his Olympic program, giving the third place Berens a chance to swim his first individual Olympic event.

At the 2012 Summer Olympics in London, Berens again won a gold medal in the men's 4×200-meter freestyle relay, together with Ryan Lochte, Conor Dwyer and Michael Phelps. Berens swam the third leg for the U.S. team in 1:45.27. He also won a silver medal as part of the second-place U.S. team for the men's 4×100-meter freestyle relay, in which he swam the third leg of the heat in 48.52.

After the final of the 4×200-meter event, Berens stated that he would retire from competitive swimming following the Olympics.

=== 2013 American Short Course Championships ===
After seven weeks, Berens came out of retirement and returned to the swimming stage. At the 2013 American Short Course Championships, he broke the American record in the 200-yard freestyle (1:31.31), taking his split from the 500-yard freestyle. At the 2013 United States National Championships, Berens finished 5th place in both the 100-meter freestyle and the 200-meter freestyle, qualifying him to swim in the 4 x 100-meter freestyle relay and 4 x 200-meter freestyle relay.

=== 2013 World Aquatics Championships ===
At the 2013 World Aquatics Championships in Barcelona, Berens combined with Conor Dwyer, Ryan Lochte and Charlie Houchin in the 4×200-meter freestyle relay, with the team finishing in first place for the gold medal. Swimming the anchor leg, Berens recorded a split of 1:45.39, and the team finished with a final time of 7:01.72.

In November 2013, Berens retired for a second time.

=== Sponsorships, media coverage, and work roles ===
In 2008, Berens was interviewed on The Today Show in Beijing after winning gold in the 4×200-meter freestyle relay. In 2009 he made an appearance on The Tyra Banks Show, poking fun at himself after a swimsuit malfunction at the 2009 World Championships. In 2011, Berens (alongside his dog) was featured in a print advertisement for Eukanuba that ran in Men's Journal magazine. Berens was also featured in a print advertisement for a Casio watch, which ran in the December 2011 issue of Details magazine.

Berens was sponsored by TYR Swimwear and by BMW's Pro Performance Team. He also appeared in the "Got Milk?" chocolate milk campaign. Berens is represented by Octagon.

After retiring from swimming competition after his second Olympics, Berens worked at the University of Texas athletic department considering a long range future role as an athletic director. Berens then used connections he had at an Austin pet food startup business called Nulo to begin a position managing their business finances, with the goal of improving the rate of Nulo's growth. He enjoyed the position but wanted to work more closely with people. Around 2020, he accepted a position in Business Development at Bridgeport Consulting after interviewing with their Denver Manager, Tommy Hannan, a 2000 U.S. Olympic 4x100 Medley gold medalist, who, like Berens, had also competed in swimming at the University of Texas and majored in Finance.

== See also ==
- List of Olympic medalists in swimming (men)
- List of United States records in swimming
- List of University of Texas at Austin alumni
- List of World Aquatics Championships medalists in swimming (men)
- List of world records in swimming
- World record progression 4 × 200 metres freestyle relay
