= Bobby Bollier =

American swimmer

Personal information
- Nationality: United States
- Born: August 22, 1989
- Height: 6 ft 0 in (183 cm)
- Weight: 185 lb (84 kg)

Sport
- Sport: Swimming
- Strokes: Butterfly
- College team: Stanford University
Medal record
Men's swimming
Representing the United States
Pan American Games
Silver medal – second place	2015 Toronto	4×200 m freestyle
Universiade
Silver medal – second place	2009 Belgrade	4×200 m freestyle
Silver medal – second place	2011 Shenzhen	200 m butterfly

Bobby Bollier (born August 22, 1989) is an American professional swimmer. Bollier is a two-time silver medalist at the World University Games.

== Biography ==
In 2015, he won a silver medal for a relay and placed 8th in the 200m fly at the Pan-American Games. He placed third in the 200 Butterfly at the 2012 US Olympic Team Trials. In 2011, he was the US National Champion in the 200m Fly. He was a 14 time CSCAA All-American and was named a First Team Academic All-American while at Stanford University. In 2015, Bollier signed with swimwear company Dolfin. Bollier received a Work the Dream Grant in 2013 from the Fran Crippen Elevation Foundation.

Bollier's mother is Barbara Bollier, a physician and former member of the Kansas Legislature. His father is Rene Bollier, a physician.
