= Carl O'Donnell =

New Zealand swimmer

Personal information
- Born: June 21, 1987 (age 39) Rotorua, New Zealand

Sport
- Sport: Swimming

Carl O'Donnell (born 21 May 1987) is a New Zealand swimmer. He competed in the 4 × 100 metre medley relay event at the 2012 Summer Olympics.
