= William Woollett Jr. Aquatics Center =

Swimming venue in Irvine, California, United States

Coordinates: 33°42′4″N 117°46′51″W

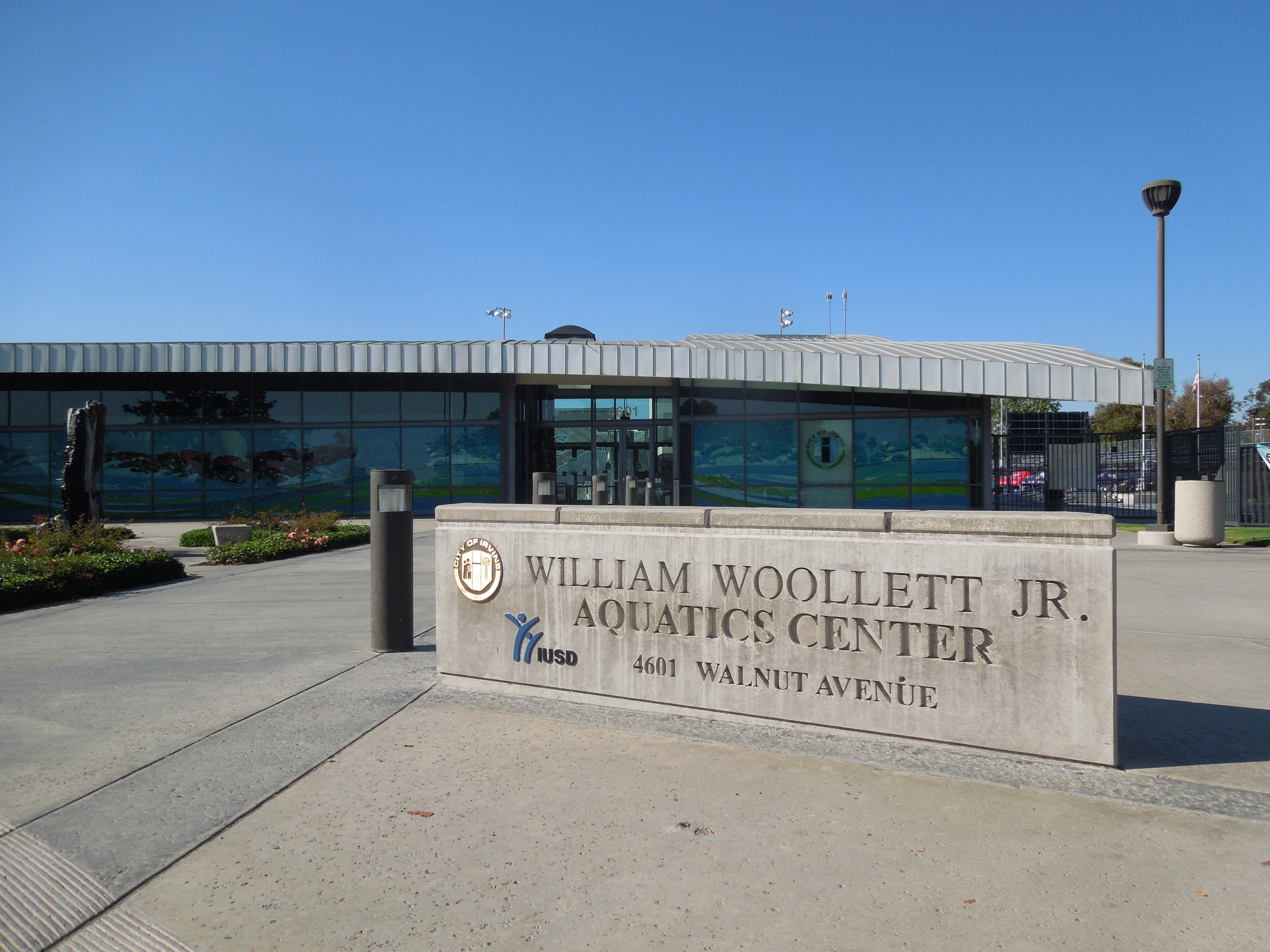
The front entrance of the Aquatics Center.

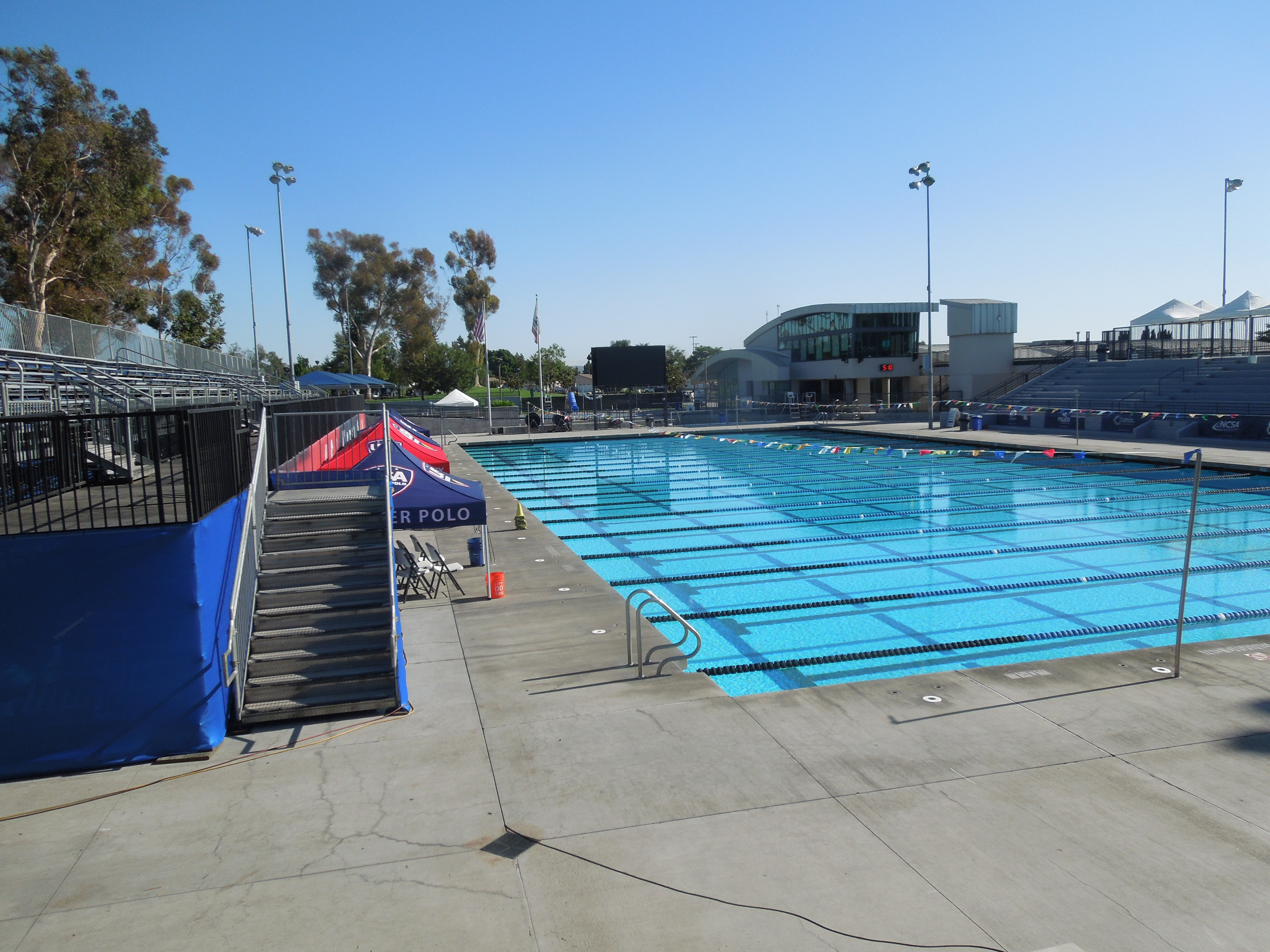
View of the competition pool

The William Woollett Jr. Aquatics Center is an aquatics venue located in Irvine, California, United States. The City of Irvine operates year-round municipal programs in the aquatic facility. The center provides a venue for local, regional and national competitive events and features two 50 meter pools and a 25-yard instruction pool. Aquatics activities include a combination of instructional, educational, recreational and competitive programs offered by the City and a number of local nonprofit aquatic organizations. During the 1984 Summer Olympics, it hosted the swimming portion of the modern pentathlon competition. It has since hosted the 2010 Pan Pacific Swimming Championships, the United States Swimming National Championships in 2005, 2006, 2010, 2014, 2018, 2022, 2026, and the 2015 USA Water Polo National Junior Olympics. The facility, originally named the Heritage Park Aquatics Center, was renamed after the City of Irvine's first City Manager and rebuilt beginning in 2003. The water polo team from Concordia University utilizes the facility, as do the water polo, swim, and underwater hockey teams from Irvine High School.

The aquatics center will host the 2026 Pan Pacific Swimming Championships, marking the second time the event is held at the venue.
