= Gideon Louw =

South African swimmer (born 1987)

Personal information
- Full name: Gideon Abraham Louw
- Nationality: South Africa
- Born: 4 September 1987 (age 38) Pretoria, South Africa
- Height: 1.93 m (6 ft 4 in)
- Weight: 93 kg (205 lb)

Sport
- Sport: Swimming
- Strokes: Freestyle
- College team: Auburn; Indian River State
Medal record
Men's swimming
Representing South Africa
Commonwealth Games
Silver medal – second place	2010 Delhi	4×100 m medley
Bronze medal – third place	2010 Delhi	4×100 m freestyle
Bronze medal – third place	2010 Delhi	50 m freestyle
All-Africa Games
Gold medal – first place	2011 Maputo	50 m freestyle
Gold medal – first place	2011 Maputo	4×100 m freestyle
Gold medal – first place	2011 Maputo	4×100 m medley
Bronze medal – third place	2007 Algiers	50 m freestyle
Bronze medal – third place	2011 Maputo	100m Freestyle

Gideon Abraham Louw (born September 4, 1987) is a South African swimmer. He competed at the 2008 Summer Olympics in Beijing, and at the 2012 Summer Olympics in London.

== See also ==
- List of Commonwealth Games medallists in swimming (men)
