= Graeme Moore =

South African swimmer (born 1989)

Personal information
- Full name: Graeme John Moore
- Born: January 28, 1989 (age 37) Johannesburg, South Africa
- Height: 6 ft 6 in (198 cm)
- Weight: 215 lb (98 kg)

Sport
- Sport: Swimming
- Club: California Golden Bears
Medal record
Representing South Africa
Commonwealth Games
Silver medal – second place	2010 Delhi	4x100m medley relay
Bronze medal – third place	2010 Delhi	4x100m freestyle relay

Graeme John Moore (born 28 January 1989) is a South African swimmer. He competed for South Africa at the 2012 Summer Olympics, in the 100 m and 4 x 100 m freestyle. He is 6'6", 215 lbs. He’s currently working as an orthopaedic surgeon in Johannesburg, South Africa.
