= Swimming at the 2012 Summer Olympics – Men's 4 × 100 metre freestyle relay =

Men's 4 × 100 metre freestyle relay at the Games of the XXX Olympiad
- Venue: London Aquatics Centre
- Dates: July 29, 2012 (heats & final)
- Competitors: 80 from 15 nations
- Teams: 15
- Winning time: 3:09.93

Medalists
1st place, gold medalist(s)		Amaury Leveaux, Fabien Gilot, Clément Lefert, Yannick Agnel, Alain Bernard*, Jérémy Stravius*	France
2nd place, silver medalist(s)		Nathan Adrian, Michael Phelps, Cullen Jones, Ryan Lochte, Jimmy Feigen*, Matt Grevers*, Ricky Berens*, Jason Lezak*	United States
3rd place, bronze medalist(s)		Andrey Grechin, Nikita Lobintsev, Vladimir Morozov, Danila Izotov, Yevgeny Lagunov*, Sergey Fesikov*; *Indicates the swimmer only competed in the preliminary heats.	Russia

The men's 4 × 100 metre freestyle relay event at the 2012 Summer Olympics took place on 29 July at the London Aquatics Centre in London, United Kingdom.

Four years after winning the silver medal in this event, the French men's team won gold for the first time as they edged out the Americans and the Australians with the help of a sterling anchor leg from Yannick Agnel. Trailing behind by 0.55 seconds at the final exchange, Agnel blistered the field with a remarkable split of 46.74 to deliver the foursome of Amaury Leveaux (48.13), Fabien Gilot (47.67), and Clément Lefert (47.39) a gold-medal time in 3:09.93. Meanwhile, the U.S. team of Nathan Adrian (47.89), Michael Phelps (47.15), and Cullen Jones (47.60) handed Ryan Lochte the anchor duties to maintain their lead, but Lochte's split of 47.74 was just a full second behind Agnel's anchor that sealed a stunning triumph for the French, leaving the U.S. with a silver medal in 3:10.38. With the second-place finish, Phelps also earned his first-ever Olympic silver medal to raise his overall tally to seventeen, (including 14 gold and 2 bronze), bringing him a single step closer to the all-time record held by Larisa Latynina.

The Russian quartet of Andrey Grechin (48.57), Nikita Lobintsev (47.39), Vladimir Morozov (47.85), and Danila Izotov (47.60) took home the bronze in 3:11.41 to edge out the more aggressive Aussie foursome of James Magnussen (48.03), Matt Targett (47.83), Eamon Sullivan (47.68), and James Roberts (48.09) by 0.22 seconds, finishing with a fourth-place time in 3:11.63.

South Africa's solid foursome of Gideon Louw (48.48), Darian Townsend (48.36), Graeme Moore (48.36), and Roland Mark Schoeman (48.27) struggled to mount a challenge in a world-record race as they finished fifth in 3:13.45, holding off the hard-charging Germans Benjamin Starke (49.03), Markus Deibler (47.97), Christoph Fildebrandt (48.45), and Marco di Carli (48.07) by seven-hundredths of a second with a sixth-place finish (3:13.52). Italy (3:14.13) and Belgium (3:14.40) also vied for an Olympic medal to round out a historic finish.

In the absence of César Cielo on the morning prelims, Brazil's Nicolas Oliveira (49.31), Bruno Fratus (48.98), Nicholas Santos (49.68), and Marcelo Chierighini (48.17) missed the final roster by almost half a second (0.50) with a ninth-place effort (3:16.14), repeating their performance from the 2011 World Aquatics Championships.

== Records ==
Prior to this competition, the existing world and Olympic records were as follows.

World record	United States; Michael Phelps (47.51); Garrett Weber-Gale (47.02); Cullen Jones (47.65); Jason Lezak (46.06)	3:08.24	Beijing, China	11 August 2008
Olympic record	United States; Michael Phelps (47.51); Garrett Weber-Gale (47.02); Cullen Jones (47.65); Jason Lezak (46.06)	3:08.24	Beijing, China	11 August 2008

== Results ==
=== Heats ===
Rank	Heat	Lane	Nation	Swimmers	Time	Notes
1	2	4	Australia	Cameron McEvoy (48.94); James Roberts (48.22); Tommaso D'Orsogna (47.78); James Magnussen (47.35)	3:12.29	Q
2	2	5	United States	Jimmy Feigen (48.49); Matt Grevers (47.54); Ricky Berens (48.52); Jason Lezak (48.04)	3:12.59	Q
3	2	3	Russia	Andrey Grechin (48.19); Yevgeny Lagunov (48.34); Sergey Fesikov (48.68); Nikita Lobintsev (47.56)	3:12.77	Q
4	1	4	France	Amaury Leveaux (48.61); Alain Bernard (48.31); Clément Lefert (48.14); Jérémy Stravius (48.32)	3:13.38	Q
5	2	6	Germany	Benjamin Starke (48.96); Markus Deibler (47.99); Christoph Fildebrandt (48.44); Marco di Carli (48.12)	3:13.51	Q, NR
6	2	2	Belgium	Dieter Dekoninck (48.79); Jasper Aerents (48.58); Emmanuel Vanluchene (48.55); Pieter Timmers (47.97)	3:13.89	Q, NR
7	1	3	South Africa	Roland Mark Schoeman (49.00); Darian Townsend (48.26); Gideon Louw (47.92); Graeme Moore (48.75)	3:13.93	Q
8	1	5	Italy	Luca Dotto (49.27); Andrea Rolla (49.46); Michele Santucci (48.85); Filippo Magnini (48.20)	3:15.78	Q
9	1	2	Brazil	Nicolas Oliveira (49.31); Bruno Fratus (48.98); Nicholas Santos (49.68); Marcelo Chierighini (48.17)	3:16.14	
10	1	7	Canada	Brent Hayden (48.42); Colin Russell (48.67); Richard Hortness (49.12); Thomas Gossland (50.21)	3:16.42	
11	2	1	China	Lü Zhiwu (48.92); Zhang Enjian (49.57); He Jianbin (49.67); Shi Tengfei (48.84)	3:17.00	
12	1	6	Great Britain	Simon Burnett (50.47); Grant Turner (48.31); James Disney-May (48.99); Craig Gibbons (49.31)	3:17.08	
13	2	8	Serbia	Milorad Čavić (48.61); Velimir Stjepanović (49.13); Ivan Lenđer (50.58); Radovan Siljevski (50.47)	3:18.79	NR
14	2	7	Hungary	Péter Bernek (50.29); Gergő Kis (50.68); Gábor Balog (51.47); Krisztián Takács (49.47)	3:21.91	
15	1	1	Venezuela	Cristian Quintero Valero (49.77); Octavio Alesi (50.04); Marcos Lavado (52.59); Crox Acuña (50.28)	3:22.68	

=== Final ===
Rank	Lane	Nation	Swimmers	Time	Time behind	Notes
1st place, gold medalist(s)	6	France	Amaury Leveaux (48.13); Fabien Gilot (47.67); Clément Lefert (47.39); Yannick Agnel (46.74)	3:09.93		
2nd place, silver medalist(s)	5	United States	Nathan Adrian (47.89); Michael Phelps (47.15); Cullen Jones (47.60); Ryan Lochte (47.74)	3:10.38	0.45	
3rd place, bronze medalist(s)	3	Russia	Andrey Grechin (48.57); Nikita Lobintsev (47.39); Vladimir Morozov (47.85); Danila Izotov (47.60)	3:11.41	1.48	
4	4	Australia	James Magnussen (48.03); Matt Targett (47.83); Eamon Sullivan (47.68); James Roberts (48.09)	3:11.63	1.70	
5	1	South Africa	Gideon Louw (48.48); Darian Townsend (48.36); Graeme Moore (48.34); Roland Mark Schoeman (48.27)	3:13.45	3.52	
6	2	Germany	Benjamin Starke (49.03); Markus Deibler (47.97); Christoph Fildebrandt (48.45); Marco di Carli (48.07)	3:13.52	3.59	
7	8	Italy	Luca Dotto (48.73); Marco Orsi (48.42); Michele Santucci (48.88); Filippo Magnini (48.10)	3:14.13	4.20	
8	7	Belgium	Dieter Dekoninck (49.42); Jasper Aerents (48.34); Emmanuel Vanluchene (48.46); Pieter Timmers (48.18)	3:14.40	4.47	
