= 2014 Pan Pacific Swimming Championships – Men's 100 metre freestyle =

Men's 100 metre freestyle at the 2014 Pan Pacific Swimming Championships
- Venue: Gold Coast Aquatic Centre
- Dates: August 22, 2014 (heats & finals)
- Competitors: 52
- Winning time: 47.82

Medalists
gold medal	Cameron McEvoy	Australia
silver medal	Nathan Adrian	United States
bronze medal	James Magnussen	Australia

The men's 100 metre freestyle competition at the 2014 Pan Pacific Swimming Championships took place on August 22 at the Gold Coast Aquatic Centre. The last champion was Nathan Adrian of US.

This race consisted of two lengths of the pool, both lengths being in freestyle.

== Records ==
Prior to this competition, the existing world and Pan Pacific records were as follows:

World record	César Cielo Filho (BRA)	46.91	Rome, Italy	July 30, 2009
Pan Pacific Championships record	Michael Phelps (USA)	48.13	Irvine, United States	August 20, 2010

== Results ==
All times are in minutes and seconds.

KEY:	q	Fastest non-qualifiers	Q	Qualified	CR	Championships record	NR	National record	PB	Personal best	SB	Seasonal best

=== Heats ===
The first round was held on August 22, at 11:00.

Rank	Name	Nationality	Time	Notes
1	Nathan Adrian	United States	48.05	QA, CR
2	James Magnussen	Australia	48.25	QA
3	Michael Phelps	United States	48.45	QA
4	Cameron McEvoy	Australia	48.49	QA
5	Ryan Lochte	United States	48.90	QA
6	João de Lucca	Brazil	49.02	QA
7	Anthony Ervin	United States	49.11	QA
8	Matthew Abood	Australia	49.13	QA
8	Nicolas Oliveira	Brazil	49.13	QA
10	Jimmy Feigen	United States	49.14	QB
11	Tommaso D'Orsogna	Australia	49.18	QB
12	Conor Dwyer	United States	49.19	QB
13	Katsumi Nakamura	Japan	49.30	QB
14	Marcelo Chierighini	Brazil	49.31	QB
15	Shinri Shioura	Japan	49.53	QB
16	Yuri Kisil	Canada	49.65	QB
17	Takuro Fujii	Japan	49.75	
18	Matt Grevers	United States	49.76	
19	Kenta Ito	Japan	49.83	
20	Jayden Hadler	Australia	49.84	
21	Tim Phillips	United States	49.98	
22	Rammaru Harada	Japan	50.00	
23	Junya Koga	Japan	50.01	
24	Reo Sakata	Japan	50.02	
25	Luke Peddie	Canada	50.07	
26	Matt McLean	United States	50.21	
27	Ned McKendry	Australia	50.39	
28	Reed Malone	United States	50.41	
29	Geoffrey Cheah	Hong Kong	50.52	
30	Matthew Ellis	United States	50.57	
31	Yuri Kobori	Japan	50.62	
31	Kenta Hirai	Japan	50.62	
33	Cullen Jones	United States	50.68	
34	Douglas Erasmus	South Africa	50.78	
35	Steven Kent	New Zealand	50.92	
36	Chris Wright	Australia	50.98	
37	Ryan Coetzee	South Africa	51.18	
38	Jeremy Wong	Hong Kong	51.19	
39	Ewan Jackson	New Zealand	51.24	
40	Hirofu Ikebata	Japan	51.30	
41	Jacques van Wyk	South Africa	51.32	
42	Richard Ellis	South Africa	51.37	
43	Ma Tianchi	China	51.41	
44	Jiang Yuhui	China	51.52	
45	Chun Nam Ng	Hong Kong	51.87	
46	Zhang Chenyu	China	52.17	
47	David Wong	Hong Kong	52.20	
48	Kent Cheung	Hong Kong	52.21	
49	Raymond Mak	Hong Kong	52.27	
50	Masato Sakai	Japan	52.55	
51	Kinve Nicholls	Fiji	59.44	
52	Takayaw Tevita	Fiji	1:01.26	

=== B Final ===
The B final was held on August 22, at 20:19.

Rank	Name	Nationality	Time	Notes
9	Marcelo Chierighini	Brazil	48.68	
10	Matthew Abood	Australia	49.17	
11	Anthony Ervin	United States	49.20	
12	Yuri Kisil	Canada	49.51	
13	Takuro Fujii	Japan	50.01	
14	Luke Peddie	Canada	50.16	
15	Geoffrey Cheah	Hong Kong	50.20	
16	Douglas Erasmus	South Africa	50.94	

=== A Final ===
The A final was held on August 22, at 20:19.

Rank	Name	Nationality	Time	Notes
1st place, gold medalist(s)	Cameron McEvoy	Australia	47.82	CR
2nd place, silver medalist(s)	Nathan Adrian	United States	48.30	
3rd place, bronze medalist(s)	James Magnussen	Australia	48.36	
4	Michael Phelps	United States	48.51	
5	Nicolas Oliveira	Brazil	48.69	
6	Katsumi Nakamura	Japan	48.96	
7	João de Lucca	Brazil	48.97	
8	Shinri Shioura	Japan	49.08	
