= 2014 Pan Pacific Swimming Championships – Men's 50 metre freestyle =

Men's 50 metre freestyle at the 2014 Pan Pacific Swimming Championships
- Venue: Gold Coast Aquatic Centre
- Dates: August 24, 2014 (heats & finals)
- Competitors: 32
- Winning time: 21.44

Medalists
gold medal	Bruno Fratus	Brazil
silver medal	Anthony Ervin	United States
bronze medal	Nathan Adrian	United States

The men's 50 metre freestyle competition at the 2014 Pan Pacific Swimming Championships took place on August 24 at the Gold Coast Aquatic Centre. The last champion was Nathan Adrian of US.

This race consisted of one length of the pool in freestyle.

== Records ==
Prior to this competition, the existing world and Pan Pacific records were as follows:

World record	César Cielo Filho (BRA)	20.91	São Paulo, Brazil	December 18, 2009
Pan Pacific Championships record	Nathan Adrian (USA)	21.55	Irvine, United States	August 21, 2010

== Results ==
All times are in minutes and seconds.

KEY:	q	Fastest non-qualifiers	Q	Qualified	CR	Championships record	NR	National record	PB	Personal best	SB	Seasonal best

=== Heats ===
The first round was held on August 24, at 11:09.

Rank	Name	Nationality	Time	Notes
1	Anthony Ervin	United States	21.75	QA
2	Nathan Adrian	United States	21.76	QA
3	Bruno Fratus	Brazil	22.10	QA
4	Marcelo Chierighini	Brazil	22.21	QA
5	Cameron McEvoy	Australia	22.27	QA
6	Matthew Abood	Australia	22.30	QA
7	Jimmy Feigen	United States	22.38	QA
8	Shinri Shioura	Japan	22.39	QA
9	Katsu Nakamura	Japan	22.47	QB
10	Cullen Jones	United States	22.49	QB
11	Kenta Ito	Japan	22.50	QB
12	Junya Koga	Japan	22.71	QB
13	Nicholas Santos	Brazil	22.75	QB
14	Luke Peddie	Canada	22.78	QB
15	Kyle Troskot	Canada	22.81	QB
16	Matthew Ellis	United States	22.82	QB
17	Nicolas Oliveira	Brazil	22.85	
18	Rammaru Harada	Japan	22.95	
19	Yuri Kisil	Canada	22.95	
20	Geoffrey Cheah	Hong Kong	22.97	
21	Douglas Erasmus	South Africa	23.05	
22	Tim Phillips	United States	23.28	
23	Chris Wright	Australia	23.48	
24	Ned McKendry	Australia	23.55	
25	Ryan Coetzee	South Africa	23.57	
26	Josh Beaver	Australia	23.68	
27	Jeremy Wong	Hong Kong	23.82	
28	Zhang Chenyu	China	24.04	
29	Jacques van Wyk	South Africa	24.15	
30	Matson Lawson	Australia	24.25	
31	Takayaw Tevita	Fiji	25.92	
32	Kinve Nicholls	Fiji	26.84	

=== B Final ===
The B final was held on August 24, at 20:24.

Rank	Name	Nationality	Time	Notes
9	Jimmy Feigen	United States	22.38	
10	Luke Peddie	Canada	22.68	
11	Kenta Ito	Japan	22.74	
12	Yuri Kisil	Canada	22.78	
13	Kyle Troskot	Canada	22.94	
14	Geoffrey Cheah	Hong Kong	22.99	
15	Douglas Erasmus	South Africa	23.05	
16	Nicholas Santos	Brazil	23.35	

=== A Final ===
The A final was held on August 24, at 20:24.

Rank	Name	Nationality	Time	Notes
1st place, gold medalist(s)	Bruno Fratus	Brazil	21.44	CR
2nd place, silver medalist(s)	Anthony Ervin	United States	21.73	
3rd place, bronze medalist(s)	Nathan Adrian	United States	21.80	
4	Cameron McEvoy	Australia	22.07	
5	Shinri Shioura	Japan	22.11	
6	Matthew Abood	Australia	22.18	
7	Katsu Nakamura	Japan	22.42	
8	Marcelo Chierighini	Brazil	22.46	
