= Swimming at the 2011 World Aquatics Championships – Men's 4 × 100 metre freestyle relay =

Men's 4×100 metre freestyle relay at the 2011 World Aquatics Championships
- Dates: July 24, 2011 (heats and final)
- Competitors: 72 from 16 nations
- Winning time: 3:11.00

Medalists
gold medal	James Magnussen; Matthew Targett; Matthew Abood; Eamon Sullivan	Australia
silver medal	Alain Bernard; Jérémy Stravius; William Meynard; Fabien Gilot	France
bronze medal	Michael Phelps; Garrett Weber-Gale; Jason Lezak; Nathan Adrian	United States

The men's 4×100 metre freestyle relay competition of the swimming events at the 2011 World Aquatics Championships took place July 24. The heats and final took place July 24.

== Records ==
Prior to the competition, the existing world and championship records were as follows.

	Name	Nation	Time	Location	Date
World record	Michael Phelps (47.51); Garrett Weber-Gale (47.02); Cullen Jones (47.65); Jason Lezak (46.06)	United States	3:08.24	Beijing	August 11, 2008
Championship record	Michael Phelps (47.78); Ryan Lochte (47.03); Matt Grevers (47.61); Nathan Adrian (46.79)	United States	3:09.21	Rome	July 26, 2009

== Results ==
=== Heats ===
17 teams participated in 3 heats, qualified teams are listed:

Rank	Heat	Lane	Nation	Swimmers	Time	Notes
1	1	4	France	Alain Bernard (48.37); Jérémy Stravius (47.87); William Meynard (48.23); Fabien Gilot (47.62)	3:12.09	Q
2	3	4	United States	Garrett Weber-Gale (48.49); Ryan Lochte (48.28); Douglas Robison (48.62); David Walters (48.11)	3:13.50	Q
3	2	4	Russia	Vladimir Morozov (49.07); Evgeny Lagunov (48.12); Danila Izotov (48.28); Sergey Fesikov (48.14)	3:13.61	Q
4	3	3	Italy	Luca Dotto (48.70); Marco Orsi (48.30); Michele Santucci (48.67); Filippo Magnini (47.94)	3:13.61	Q
5	3	5	Australia	Kyle Richardson (48.92); Matthew Abood (47.91); James Roberts (48.25); Eamon Sullivan (48.71)	3:13.79	Q
6	1	3	Germany	Steffen Deibler (49.01); Markus Deibler (48.06); Christoph Fildebrandt (48.75); Marco di Carli (48.41)	3:14.23	Q, NR
7	2	3	South Africa	Graeme Moore (49.61); Darian Townsend (48.12); Gideon Louw (48.11); Leith Shankland (48.88)	3:14.72	Q
8	2	5	Great Britain	Adam Brown (49.05); Liam Tancock (48.51); Grant Turner (48.79); Simon Burnett (49.00)	3:15.35	Q
9	3	2	Brazil	Bruno Fratus (49.06); Nicolas Oliveira (48.20); Marcos Macedo (50.32); Marcelo Chierighini (48.70)	3:16.28	
10	1	6	Japan	Takuro Fujii (48.88); Shogo Hihara (48.83); Yoshihiro Okumura (49.63); Takeshi Matsuda (49.29)	3:16.63	
11	1	5	Sweden	Stefan Nystrand (49.49); Petter Stymne (48.65); Lars Frölander (48.79); Robin Andreasson (50.14)	3:17.07	
12	2	6	Canada	Brent Hayden (48.77); Colin Russell (49.20); Blake Worsley (49.28); Dominique Massie-Martel (50.10)	3:17.35	
13	3	6	China	Lü Zhiwu (49.19); Jiang Haiqi (50.14); He Jianbin (48.50); Zhang Enjian (49.73)	3:17.56	
14	3	7	Venezuela	Crox Ernesto Acuna (50.10); Octavio Alesi (50.06); Daniele Tirabassi (49.53); Cristian Quintero (49.49)	3:19.18	
15	2	7	Slovenia	Peter Mankoč (49.95); Robert Zbogar (50.96); Jan Karel Petric (53.66); Matjaž Markič (1:05.65)	3:40.22	
–	1	2	South Korea			DNS
–	2	2	Belgium	Yoris Grandjean (49.74); Glenn Surgeloose (49.71); Jasper Aerents (48.57); Pieter Timmers		DSQ

=== Final ===
The final was held at 19:20.

Rank	Lane	Nation	Swimmers	Time	Notes
1st place, gold medalist(s)	2	Australia	James Magnussen (47.49); Matthew Targett (47.87); Matthew Abood (47.92); Eamon Sullivan (47.72)	3:11.00	
2nd place, silver medalist(s)	4	France	Alain Bernard (48.75); Jérémy Stravius (47.78); William Meynard (47.39); Fabien Gilot (47.22)	3:11.14	
3rd place, bronze medalist(s)	5	United States	Michael Phelps (48.08); Garrett Weber-Gale (48.33); Jason Lezak (48.15); Nathan Adrian (47.40)	3:11.96	
4	6	Italy	Luca Dotto (48.56); Marco Orsi (48.51); Michele Santucci (48.01); Filippo Magnini (47.31)	3:12.39	
5	3	Russia	Evgeny Lagunov (48.89); Andrey Grechin (48.56); Nikita Lobintsev (47.45); Sergey Fesikov (48.09)	3:12.99	
6	1	South Africa	Graeme Moore (48.15); Darian Townsend (47.76); Gideon Louw (47.91); Leith Shankland (49.56)	3:13.38	
7	7	Germany	Markus Deibler (49.24); Benjamin Starke (49.22); Christoph Fildebrandt (48.45); Marco di Carli (48.10)	3:15.01	
8	8	Great Britain	Adam Brown (49.05); Liam Tancock (48.60); Grant Turner (48.86); Simon Burnett (48.52)	3:15.03	
