= 2006 Pan Pacific Swimming Championships – Men's 50 metre freestyle =

Men's 50 metre freestyle at the 2006 Pan Pacific Swimming Championships
- Venue: Saanich Commonwealth Place
- Dates: August 20, 2006 (heats & finals)
- Competitors: 51 from 12 nations
- Winning time: 21.84

Medalists
gold medal	Cullen Jones	United States
silver medal	Roland Schoeman	South Africa
bronze medal	Brent Hayden	Canada

The men's 50 metre freestyle competition at the 2006 Pan Pacific Swimming Championships took place on August 20 at the Saanich Commonwealth Place. The last champion was Jason Lezak of US.

This race consisted of one length of the pool in freestyle.

== Records ==
Prior to this competition, the existing world and Pan Pacific records were as follows:

World record	Alexander Popov (RUS)	21.64	Moscow, Russia	June 16, 2000
Pan Pacific Championships record	Brendon Dedekind (RSA)	22.06	Sydney, Australia	August 28, 1999

== Results ==
All times are in minutes and seconds.

KEY:	q	Fastest non-qualifiers	Q	Qualified	CR	Championships record	NR	National record	PB	Personal best	SB	Seasonal best

=== Heats ===
The first round was held on August 20, at 10:30.

Rank	Heat	Lane	Name	Nationality	Time	Notes
1	7	4	Cullen Jones	United States	22.14	QA
2	6	4	Roland Schoeman	South Africa	22.16	QA
3	5	4	Ben Wildman-Tobriner	United States	22.45	QA
4	5	5	Gary Hall, Jr.	United States	22.46	QA
4	7	5	Jason Lezak	United States	22.46	QA
6	5	7	César Cielo	Brazil	22.54	QA
7	7	3	Neil Walker	United States	22.61	QA
8	7	6	George Bovell	Trinidad and Tobago	22.62	QA
9	7	2	Brent Hayden	Canada	22.63	QB
10	6	5	Eamon Sullivan	Australia	22.64	QB
11	6	6	Lyndon Ferns	South Africa	22.65	QB
12	3	8	Peter Marshall	United States	22.74	QB
13	6	3	Makoto Ito	Japan	22.79	QB
13	6	7	Marco Sapucaia	Brazil	22.79	QB
15	5	2	Nicholas Santos	Brazil	22.92	QB
16	7	8	Ian Crocker	United States	22.94	QB
17	5	3	Guilherme Santos	Brazil	23.01	
18	5	6	Gerhard Zandberg	South Africa	23.03	
19	7	1	Matthew Lowe	United States	23.16	
20	4	8	Eduardo Deboni	Brazil	23.19	
21	3	7	Rodrigo Castro	Brazil	23.22	
22	7	7	Takeru Sasaki	Japan	23.24	
23	4	3	Yannick Lupien	Canada	23.26	
23	5	8	Rick Say	Canada	23.26	
25	6	8	Daisuke Hosokawa	Japan	23.28	
26	1	4	Nicolas Oliveira	Brazil	23.34	
26	6	1	Edvaldo Valério	Brazil	23.34	
28	4	6	Casey Flouch	Australia	23.48	
29	3	5	Corney Swanepoel	New Zealand	23.51	
30	5	1	Thomas Kindler	Canada	23.52	
31	2	1	Andrew Mewing	Australia	23.54	
32	3	3	Klete Keller	United States	23.56	
33	4	2	Joel Greenshields	Canada	23.59	
34	2	4	Robert Voss	New Zealand	23.67	
34	3	4	Ashley Delaney	Australia	23.67	
34	4	4	Takamitsu Kojima	Japan	23.67	
37	4	5	Hiroaki Yamamoto	Japan	23.72	
38	4	7	Cameron Gibson	New Zealand	23.88	
39	1	3	Nicholas Ffrost	Australia	23.94	
40	4	1	Kenrick Monk	Australia	23.95	
41	3	6	Michael Jack	New Zealand	24.01	
42	2	2	Moss Burmester	New Zealand	24.06	
43	3	2	Oliver Elliot	Chile	24.17	
44	2	8	Pascal Wollach	Canada	24.19	
45	2	7	Jake Tapp	Canada	24.22	
46	2	6	Kendrick Uy	Philippines	24.23	
47	2	5	Raymond Betuzzi	Canada	24.30	
48	3	1	Feng Lizhong	China	24.53	
49	1	5	Ben Pickersgill-Brown	New Zealand	24.57	
50	2	3	Lim Nam-Gyun	South Korea	24.60	
51	1	6	John Zulch	New Zealand	25.08	
-	1	2	Charles Francis	Canada	DSQ	
-	6	2	Matt Rose	Canada	DSQ	

=== B Final ===
The B final was held on August 20, at 19:07.

Rank	Lane	Name	Nationality	Time	Notes
9	4	Jason Lezak	United States	22.40	
10	6	Nicholas Santos	Brazil	22.48	
11	5	Marco Sapucaia	Brazil	22.76	
12	3	Makoto Ito	Japan	23.04	
13	1	Yannick Lupien	Canada	23.11	
14	2	Gerhard Zandberg	South Africa	23.15	
15	8	Rick Say	Canada	23.37	
16	7	Takeru Sasaki	Japan	23.56	

=== A Final ===
The A final was held on August 20, at 19:07.

Rank	Lane	Name	Nationality	Time	Notes
1st place, gold medalist(s)	4	Cullen Jones	United States	21.84	CR
2nd place, silver medalist(s)	5	Roland Schoeman	South Africa	22.12	
3rd place, bronze medalist(s)	7	Brent Hayden	Canada	22.22	
4	8	Lyndon Ferns	South Africa	22.42	
5	3	Ben Wildman-Tobriner	United States	22.44	
6	6	César Cielo	Brazil	22.45	
7	1	Eamon Sullivan	Australia	22.57	
8	2	George Bovell	Trinidad and Tobago	22.59	
