= 2014 Pan Pacific Swimming Championships – Men's 4 × 100 metre freestyle relay =

Men's 4 × 100 metre freestyle relay at the 2014 Pan Pacific Swimming Championships
- Venue: Gold Coast Aquatic Centre
- Dates: August 23, 2014 (heats & finals)
- Winning time: 3:12.80

Medalists
gold medal	Tommaso D'Orsogna, James Magnussen, Matthew Abood and Cameron McEvoy	Australia
silver medal	Michael Phelps, Nathan Adrian, Anthony Ervin and Ryan Lochte	United States
bronze medal	João de Lucca, Marcelo Chierighini, Bruno Fratus and Nicolas Oliveira	Brazil

The men's 4 × 100 metre freestyle relay competition at the 2014 Pan Pacific Swimming Championships took place on August 23 at the Gold Coast Aquatic Centre. The last champion was the United States.

This race consisted of eight lengths of the pool. Each of the four swimmers completed two lengths of the pool. The first swimmer had to touch the wall before the second could leave the starting block.

== Records ==
Prior to this competition, the existing world and Pan Pacific records were as follows:

World record	United States (USA); Michael Phelps (47.51); Garrett Weber-Gale (47.02); Cullen Jones (47.65); Jason Lezak (46.06)	3:08.24	Beijing, China	August 11, 2008
Pan Pacific Championships record	United States (USA); Michael Phelps (48.13); Ryan Lochte (47.98); Jason Lezak (48.12); Nathan Adrian (47.51)	3:11.74	Irvine, United States	August 20, 2010

== Results ==
All times are in minutes and seconds.

KEY:	q	Fastest non-qualifiers	Q	Qualified	CR	Championships record	NR	National record	PB	Personal best	SB	Seasonal best

=== Heats ===
Heats weren't performed, as only seven teams had entered.

=== Final ===
The final was held on August 23, at 21:19.

Rank	Name	Nationality	Time	Notes
1st place, gold medalist(s)	Tommaso D'Orsogna (49.29); James Magnussen (47.68); Matthew Abood (48.23); Cameron McEvoy (47.60)	Australia	3:12.80	
2nd place, silver medalist(s)	Michael Phelps (48.88); Nathan Adrian (47.71); Anthony Ervin (48.57); Ryan Lochte (48.20)	United States	3:13.36	
3rd place, bronze medalist(s)	João de Lucca (49.05); Marcelo Chierighini (47.91); Bruno Fratus (48.00); Nicolas Oliveira (48.63)	Brazil	3:13.59	
4	Shinri Shioura (49.13); Katsumi Nakamura (48.09); Takuro Fujii (49.35); Kenta Ito (48.36)	Japan	3:14.93	
5	Yuri Kisil (49.26); Luke Peddie (49.75); Kyle Troskot (49.98); Coleman Allen (50.27)	Canada	3:19.26	
6	Jeremy Wong (50.92); Chun Nam Ng (51.70); David Wong (52.05); Geoffrey Cheah (49.80)	Hong Kong	3:24.47	
7	Douglas Erasmus (51.16); Richard Ellis (51.39); Jacques van Wyk (51.23); Ryan Coetzee (50.92)	South Africa	3:24.70	
