= Swimming at the 2014 South American Games – Men's 50 metre freestyle =

Men's 50 metre freestyle at the 2014 South American Games
- Venue: Estadio Nacional
- Dates: March 9, 2014 (heats & finals)
- Competitors: 21 from 11 nations
- Winning time: 22.40

Medalists
gold medal	Bruno Fratus	Brazil
silver medal	Federico Grabich	Argentina
bronze medal	Renzo Tjon-A-Joe	Suriname

The men's 50 metre freestyle competition at the 2014 South American Games took place on March 9 at the Estadio Nacional. The last champion was Crox Acuña of Venezuela.

This race consisted of one length of the pool in freestyle.

== Records ==
Prior to this competition, the existing world and Pan Pacific records were as follows:

World record	César Cielo Filho (BRA)	20.91	São Paulo, Brazil	December 18, 2009
South American Games record	José Meolans (ARG)	22.66	Buenos Aires, Argentina	November 17, 2006

== Results ==
All times are in minutes and seconds.

KEY:	q	Fastest non-qualifiers	Q	Qualified	CR	Championships record	NR	National record	PB	Personal best	SB	Seasonal best

=== Heats ===
The first round was held on March 9, at 11:00.

Rank	Heat	Lane	Name	Nationality	Time	Notes
1	3	4	Bruno Fratus	Brazil	22.12	Q, CR
2	3	3	Federico Grabich	Argentina	22.78	Q
3	1	4	Gabriel Melconian Alvez	Uruguay	22.87	Q
4	2	4	Nicholas Santos	Brazil	23.04	Q
5	1	3	Enzo Martinez Scarpe	Uruguay	23.07	Q
6	2	3	Jesus Casanova	Venezuela	23.23	Q
7	3	6	Matías Aguilera	Argentina	23.26	Q
8	3	5	Renzo Tjon-A-Joe	Suriname	23.27	Q
9	2	5	Oliver Elliot	Chile	23.33	
10	1	5	Jesus Daniel Lopez	Venezuela	23.59	
11	3	2	Zuhayr Pigot	Suriname	23.67	
12	1	6	Alberto Morales	Colombia	23.73	
13	2	6	Juan Pablo Botero	Colombia	23.79	
14	3	1	Andrew Rutherfurd	Bolivia	24.09	
15	1	2	William Vallejos Reyes	Paraguay	24.12	
16	3	7	Tyrone Alvarado Cervantes	Ecuador	24.54	
17	2	7	Jemal Le Grand	Aruba	24.56	
18	2	1	Martín Marchetti	Chile	24.86	
18	1	1	Jose Quintanilla Moreno	Bolivia	24.86	
20	2	2	Matias Gadea Basualdo	Paraguay	24.89	
21	1	7	Byron Franco Zambrano	Ecuador	25.24	

=== Final ===
The final was held on March 9, at 18:00.

Rank	Lane	Name	Nationality	Time	Notes
1st place, gold medalist(s)	4	Bruno Fratus	Brazil	22.40	
2nd place, silver medalist(s)	5	Federico Grabich	Argentina	22.86	
3rd place, bronze medalist(s)	8	Renzo Tjon-A-Joe	Suriname	22.88	
4	3	Gabriel Melconian Alvez	Uruguay	23.01	
5	6	Nicholas Santos	Brazil	23.09	
6	2	Enzo Martinez Scarpe	Uruguay	23.14	
7	1	Matías Aguilera	Argentina	23.25	
8	7	Jesus Casanova	Venezuela	23.33	
