= James Magnussen =

Australian swimmer (born 1991)

Personal information
- Full name: James Magnussen
- Nicknames: "The Magnet", "The Missile", "Maggie"
- National team: Australia
- Born: 11 April 1991 (age 35) Port Macquarie, New South Wales, Australia
- Height: 2.00 m (6 ft 7 in)
- Weight: 120 kg (260 lb)

Sport
- Sport: Swimming
- Strokes: Freestyle
- Club: Ravenswood Swim Club
- Coach: Mitch Falvey
Medal record
Men's swimming
Representing Australia
Event	1st	2nd	3rd
Olympic Games	0	1	2
World Championships (LC)	3	2	0
Pan Pacific Championships	1	1	1
Commonwealth Games	4	1	1
Total	8	5	4
Olympic Games
Silver medal – second place	2012 London	100 m freestyle
Bronze medal – third place	2012 London	4×100 m medley
Bronze medal – third place	2016 Rio de Janeiro	4×100 m freestyle
World Championships (LC)
Gold medal – first place	2011 Shanghai	100 m freestyle
Gold medal – first place	2011 Shanghai	4×100 m freestyle
Gold medal – first place	2013 Barcelona	100 m freestyle
Silver medal – second place	2011 Shanghai	4×100 m medley
Silver medal – second place	2013 Barcelona	4×100 m medley
Pan Pacific Championships
Gold medal – first place	2014 Gold Coast	4×100 m freestyle
Silver medal – second place	2010 Irvine	4×100 m freestyle
Bronze medal – third place	2014 Gold Coast	100 m freestyle
Commonwealth Games
Gold medal – first place	2010 Delhi	4×100 m freestyle
Gold medal – first place	2014 Glasgow	100 m freestyle
Gold medal – first place	2014 Glasgow	4×100 m freestyle
Gold medal – first place	2018 Gold Coast	4×100 m freestyle
Silver medal – second place	2014 Glasgow	4×100 m medley
Bronze medal – third place	2014 Glasgow	50 m freestyle

James Magnussen (born 11 April 1991) is a retired Australian swimmer and Olympic medallist. He was the 2011 and 2013 100-metre freestyle world champion, and holds the record for the fifth fastest swim in history in the 100-metre freestyle, with a time of 47.10, which until 2016 also stood as the fastest swim in textile swimwear material.

He has won a total of 16 medals in major international competition, eight gold, five silver and three bronze, spanning the Olympics, World Championships, Commonwealth Games, and the Pan Pacific Championships. He retired on 5 June 2019.

== Career ==
=== 2010 ===
At the 2010 Australian Swimming Championships, Magnussen came third in the 100-metre freestyle, with a time of 49.43, thus qualifying for the national team.

In the 2010 Pan Pacific Championships, Magnussen earned a silver medal in the 4x100 metre freestyle relay, with Eamon Sullivan, Kyle Richardson, and Cameron Prosser in a time of 3:14.30, finishing behind the United States. Swimming the anchor leg, he had a split of 48.25. In the 100-metre freestyle, Magnussen finished 10th overall with a time of 48.94.

At the 2010 Commonwealth Games in Delhi, Magnussen won a gold medal in the 4×100-metre freestyle relay, with Kyle Richardson, Eamon Sullivan, and Tommaso D'Orsogna in a time of 3:13.92. At year's end, Magnussen competed at the 2010 FINA World Swimming Championships (25 m) in Dubai, and was part of the Australian team that finished 5th in the 4×100-metre freestyle relay.

=== 2011 World Championships ===
At the 2011 Australian Swimming Championships, Magnussen qualified for the national team by winning the 100-metre freestyle in a time of 48.29.

At the 2011 World Aquatics Championships, Magnussen won a total of three medals, two golds and one silver. In his first event, the 4×100-metre freestyle relay, Magnussen won gold with Matthew Targett, Matthew Abood, and Eamon Sullivan in a time of 3:11.00. As the lead-off swimmer, he had a time of 47.49. Magnussen's lead-off time eclipsed Pieter van den Hoogenband's (unofficial) pre-polyurethane suit record of 47.84, and, at the time, was the fastest swim ever over that distance by a swimmer not wearing the now-banned suit. Four days later, Magnussen became the first Australian man to win the 100-metre freestyle at a World Championships, with a time of 47.63 seconds. At the first 50 in the 100-metre freestyle, Magnussen was in fifth place in 22.94, but came back fastest in 24.69 for the win. After the race, Magnussen said, "When I get back to Australia, I will be relaxing with my friends, and it will sound amazing to be called a world champion. It has been six weeks since I have gotten a good night's sleep. No Australian has won this race at the world championships before, so it is good to be in the same club as the legends of this sport." On the final night of competition, Magnussen won a silver medal in the 4x100-metre medley relay with, Hayden Stoeckel, Brenton Rickard, and Geoff Huegill in a time of 3:32.26. Swimming the freestyle leg, Magnussen had a split of 47.00, by far the fastest in the field and was almost enough to overtake the gold winning Americans for 1st place.

=== 2012 Australian Swimming Championships ===
At the 2012 Australian Swimming Championships, which also served as Australia's Olympic trials, Magnussen qualified for the 2012 Summer Olympics, by becoming the national champion in the 50 and 100-metre freestyle. In his first event, the 100-metre freestyle, Magnussen recorded a time of 47.10 to win by over half a second. His 100-metre freestyle time was the 4th fastest swim in the history of the event, and also lowered his own unofficial textile record of 47.49. In the 100-metre freestyle final, Magnussen had a drastic change of tactics compared to his swims in Shanghai. At the first 50, Magnussen had a swift split of 22.68, and came back in 24.42. In the 100-metre freestyle final in Shanghai, he went out in 22.94 and came back in 24.69. Thus, Magnussen was more aggressive in the first 50-metres. Magnussen has stated he does plan on targeting César Cielo's world record of 46.91 in the 100-metre freestyle. After topping the heats (22.19) and semifinals (21.87) in the 50-metre freestyle, Magnussen won the final in a time of 21.52, the fastest any Australian has ever been in textile swimwear in that event. Prior to this competition, Magnussen's personal best in the 50-metre freestyle was 22.41.

=== 2012 Summer Olympics ===
At the 2012 Summer Olympics in London, Magnussen won two medals, one silver and one bronze. In his first event, the 4×100-metre freestyle, Magnussen and his three other relay team members came fourth behind France, United States and Russia, despite being the favourites. As the lead-off leg, Magnussen recorded a time of 48.03, much slower than the 47.49 he led off in Shanghai. In the 100-metre freestyle final, Magnussen came in second by one-hundredth of a second to American swimmer Nathan Adrian 47.53 to 47.52, winning the silver medal. Overall, he said in an interview after his swim he swam his best but unfortunately it wasn't enough. In the 50-metre freestyle, Magnussen failed to advance to the final, finishing with a time of 22.00 in the semifinals. Issues pertaining to Magnussen's behaviour before and during the 2012 London Summer Olympics became apparent, due to reports that his Australian Swim Team teammates ultimately cheered upon his defeat in the 100-metre freestyle final. Magnussen was accused of having a "big head" during the games, with claims that "he did not feel the need to attend team meetings and that he did not want to sit poolside to watch other Australian swimmers compete". There were also some complaints about Magnussen and his 100 metre relay teammates, dubbed the Weapons of Mass Destruction, who were accused of harassing other Australian swimmers who in return described the quartet as "out of control".

=== 2013 World Championships & FINA World Cup ===
In his first event at the 2013 World Aquatics Championships in Barcelona, Magnussen combined with Cameron McEvoy, Tommaso D'Orsogna, and James Roberts in the 4x100-metre freestyle relay, with the team finishing fourth place, repeating their result from the 2012 Olympics. Swimming the lead-off, Magnussen recorded a split of 48.00, finishing behind American Nathan Adrian for the second-best opening leg. Going into the relay, Magnussen held the top 100-metre freestyle time of 2013 with a 47.53 but like 2012, was not able to replicate his in-season time.

In the 100-metre freestyle, Magnussen successfully defended his title, winning with a time of 47.71. He also competed in the 50 m freestyle event, but was unable to make the final, finishing ninth in the semifinals. He finished off the competition by anchoring Australia's 4x100-metre medley relay, with them going on to win the silver medal, only .09 behind the winners.

Only four days after World Championships, Magnussen was back in the pool for the first stop on the short course Fina World Cup. Here he placed first in the 100 m freestyle event, finishing in a new time of 45.60 and .04 ahead of Vladimir Morozov.

=== 2014 ===
In January, Magnussen opened the season in very sharp form, clocking 47.59 at the Perth Aquatic Super Series, followed by a 21.88 in the 50 m freestyle.

At the 2014 Australian Championships, Magnussen was favorite to win after posting 6 times under 48 seconds. In the final Magnussen swam a time of 47.92, but was beaten by Cameron McEvoy who won in 47.65. However, he did qualify for the Commonwealth Games. He blamed his loss on chasing the world record instead of sticking to his race plan.

The Australian team swept the medal table in the 100 metre freestyle at the 2014 Commonwealth Games in Glasgow, with Magnussen winning gold. He also won two medals for relay events and bronze in the 50 metre freestyle. A lower back injury disrupted his 2014 season, and he also had a shoulder injury which required surgery in 2015.

=== 2016 Summer Olympics ===
At the 2016 Summer Olympics in Rio, Magnussen won a bronze medal in the 4×100-metre freestyle relay along with his team members behind United States and France.

=== 2018 ===
In 2018, Magnussen was part of the Australian team that won gold in the men's 4 x 100 m freestyle relay at the 2018 Commonwealth Games, held in the Gold Coast.

=== 2024–2025 ===
In February 2024, Magnussen announced that he would be coming out of retirement to take part in the Enhanced Games. Magnussen will be paid $1 million if he breaks the men’s 50m freestyle record, but any record will not be official due to the lack of drug testing. However, in May 2025, Enhanced Games announced that Greek swimmer Kristian Gkolomeev had unofficially broken the long course 50 metres freestyle world record at a February 2025 private event, beating Magnussen to the record, and winning the $1 million prize. He reportedly swam 20.89 seconds, 0.02 seconds faster than the current record by César Cielo.

== Personal bests ==
Long course
Event	Time	Meet
50 m freestyle	21.52	2013 Australian Championships
100 m freestyle	47.10	2012 Australian Championships
200 m freestyle	1:47.69	2014 NSW State Championship

Short course
Event	Time	Meet
50 m freestyle	20.98	2013 FINA World Cup
100 m freestyle	45.60	2013 FINA World Cup
200 m freestyle	1:44.12	2011 Australian SC Championships

== Television ==
In 2020, it was announced Magnussen would be participating the Seven Network's reality program SAS Australia. In 2023, it was announced Magnussen would be participating the twentieth series of Dancing with the Stars. He was paired with Natalie Lowe.

== See also ==
- List of Olympic medalists in swimming (men)
- List of Commonwealth Games medallists in swimming (men)
