= Swimming at the 2019 Pan American Games – Men's 50 metre freestyle =

Men's 50 metre freestyle at the 2019 Pan American Games
- Venue: Villa Deportiva Nacional, VIDENA
- Dates: August 9 (preliminaries and finals)
- Competitors: 32 from 27 nations
- Winning time: 21.61

Medalists
Gold medal	Bruno Fratus	Brazil
Silver medal	Nathan Adrian	United States
Bronze medal	Michael Chadwick	United States

The men's 50 metre freestyle competition of the swimming events at the 2019 Pan American Games was held on 9 August 2019 at the Villa Deportiva Nacional Videna cluster.

== Records ==
Prior to this competition, the existing world and Pan American Games records were as follows:

World record	César Cielo Filho (BRA)	20.91	São Paulo, Brazil	December 18, 2009
Pan American Games record	César Cielo Filho (BRA)	21.58	Guadalajara, Mexico	October 20, 2011

== Results ==
KEY:	q	Fastest non-qualifiers	Q	Qualified	GR	Games record	NR	National record	PB	Personal best	SB	Seasonal best

=== Heats ===
The first round was held on August 9.

Rank	Heat	Lane	Name	Nationality	Time	Notes
1	4	5	Michael Chadwick	United States	21.95	QA
2	4	4	Bruno Fratus	Brazil	22.02	QA
3	2	4	Nathan Adrian	United States	22.12	QA
4	3	4	Pedro Spajari	Brazil	22.17	QA
5	3	5	Renzo Tjon-A-Joe	Suriname	22.24	QA
6	2	5	Gabriel Castaño	Mexico	22.36	QA
7	3	3	Alberto Mestre	Venezuela	22.52	QA
8	2	3	Santiago Grassi	Argentina	22.70	QA
9	3	7	Brett Fraser	Cayman Islands	22.74	QB
10	4	6	Enzo Martínez	Uruguay	22.77	QB
11	3	6	Luis Martínez	Guatemala	22.85	QB
12	4	3	Dylan Carter	Trinidad and Tobago	22.87	QB
13	2	6	Daniel Ramírez	Mexico	23.00	QB
14	4	2	Guido Buscaglia	Argentina	23.06	QB
14	3	2	Mikel Schreuders	Aruba	23.06	QB
16	4	7	Oliver Elliot	Chile	23.25	QB
17	2	2	Ben Hockin	Paraguay	23.26	
18	3	8	Gershwin Greene	Bahamas	23.33	
19	2	7	Isaac Beitía	Panama	23.48	
20	1	4	Adriel Sanes	Virgin Islands	23.54	
21	2	1	Marco Flores	Honduras	23.55	
22	4	8	Jack Kirby	Barbados	23.82	
23	4	1	Jean-Luc Zephir	Saint Lucia	23.84	
24	3	1	José Alberto Quintanilla	Bolivia	23.89	
25	2	8	Jesse Washington	Bermuda	23.92	
26	1	5	Miguel Mena	Nicaragua	24.00	
27	1	3	Sebastian Arispe Silva	Peru	24.01	
28	1	7	Anthony Rincón	Colombia	24.06	
29	1	6	Miguel Zavaleta	Peru	24.07	
30	1	2	Delron Felix	Grenada	24.84	
31	1	1	Lleyton Martin	Antigua and Barbuda	25.00	
32	1	8	Cruz Halbich	Saint Vincent and the Grenadines	25.72	

=== Final B ===
The B final was also held on August 9.

Rank	Lane	Name	Nationality	Time	Notes
9	6	Dylan Carter	Trinidad and Tobago	22.67	
10	5	Enzo Martínez	Uruguay	22.74	
11	1	Mikel Schreuders	Aruba	22.89	
12	3	Luis Martínez	Guatemala	22.99	
13	7	Guido Buscaglia	Argentina	23.09	
14	2	Daniel Ramírez	Mexico	23.16	
15	8	Oliver Elliot	Chile	23.25	
16	4	Brett Fraser	Cayman Islands	23.42	

=== Final A ===
The A final was also held on August 9.

Rank	Lane	Name	Nationality	Time	Notes
1st place, gold medalist(s)	5	Bruno Fratus	Brazil	21.61	
2nd place, silver medalist(s)	3	Nathan Adrian	United States	21.87	
3rd place, bronze medalist(s)	4	Michael Chadwick	United States	21.99	
4	7	Gabriel Castaño	Mexico	22.23	
5	6	Pedro Spajari	Brazil	22.27	
6	8	Santiago Grassi	Argentina	22.28	
7	1	Alberto Mestre	Venezuela	22.40	
8	2	Renzo Tjon-A-Joe	Suriname	22.58	
