= Matt Targett (swimmer) =

Australian sprint freestyle & butterfly swimmer and model

Personal information
- Full name: Matthew Stephen Craig Targett
- Nickname: "Matt"
- National team: Australia
- Born: 24 December 1985 (age 40) Chertsey, England
- Height: 1.98 m (6 ft 6 in)
- Weight: 90 kg (198 lb)

Sport
- Sport: Swimming
- Strokes: Butterfly, freestyle
- Club: Nunawading Swimming Club; Melbourne Vicentre
- College team: Auburn University
- Coach: Rohan Taylor
Medal record
Men's swimming
Representing Australia
Olympic Games
Silver medal – second place	2008 Beijing	4×100 m medley
Bronze medal – third place	2008 Beijing	4×100 m freestyle
Bronze medal – third place	2012 London	4×100 m medley
World Championships (LC)
Gold medal – first place	2011 Shanghai	4×100 m freestyle
Silver medal – second place	2009 Rome	50 m butterfly
Silver medal – second place	2011 Shanghai	50 m butterfly
Bronze medal – third place	2009 Rome	4×100 m medley

Matthew Stephen Targett (born 24 December 1985) is an Australian sprint freestyle and butterfly swimmer and model.

== Career ==
=== 2006 Commonwealth Games ===
In 2006 and in his home town of Melbourne, Targett competed in the 50-metre butterfly, finishing second and placing above more experienced countrymen Michael Klim and Matt Welsh. Targett was later disqualified for twitching before the starter's signal.

=== 2008 Olympic Games ===
Targett's second international meet was at the 2008 Olympics in Beijing, China, capturing a silver in the 4×100-metre medley and a bronze in the 4×100-metre freestyle relay, both in new Commonwealth record time. He also finished 7th in the individual 100-metre freestyle.

=== 2009 World Championships ===
Matt Targett's first world championships came in 2009 in Rome, Italy, he swam 4 races on day one, and thus not looking in peak form in the 4×100-metre freestyle relay, with the absence of Ashley Callus and Eamon Sullivan, Australia was never in medal territory. Everything turned around on night 2, when he captured a silver in the 50-metre butterfly, with a terrific first 35 meters, he started to even up and he was touched out by Milorad Čavić by six hundredths. On the final day of competition he anchored the 4×100-metre medley relay to bronze.

In 2010, amidst sickness, Targett finished 5th in 50-metre butterfly and 14th in the 100-metre freestyle at the Telstra Australian Swimming Trials and failed to qualify for a second Commonwealth Games.

=== 2011 World Championships ===
On night 1, James Magnussen was the starter for the Australian relay team for the 4×100-metre freestyle relay, setting a swift 47.49 to get a large lead over Michael Phelps and Alain Bernard. Targett swam the second leg to extend the lead, Australia lead the whole way changing over to the 3rd leg with Matt Abood, finishing with sprinting veteran Eamon Sullivan holding off a strong finish by France. Night 2 brought more success, capturing silver again in the 50-metre butterfly behind César Cielo, his compatriot Geoff Huegill finishing with the bronze. In the lead up to these championships, Targett developed a reputation at his club for his intensive strength regime outside the pool.

=== 2012 Olympics ===
Targett was only selected for the 4×100-metre freestyle relay alongside countrymen James Magnussen, Eamon Sullivan and James Roberts. As favorites leading up to the London Games, the team was dubbed "Weapons of Mass Destruction" by the Australian media. The morning team, of which Targett and Sullivan were not part of, qualified fastest for the final. However, the team came only 4th behind France, the US and Russia. After a slow start by Magnussen, Targett as second swimmer held on to gain a position, while Sullivan, who had the fastest split of the team retained third place, however anchor James Roberts was unable to hold off a Russian powerhouse team, and was pipped at the wall and finished in 4th position.

In a surprise decision by the Australian coaching staff, Targett was selected to swim the butterfly leg of the 4×100-metre medley relay in the heats. Targett swam a 51.30 and as a result was placed into the team for the final along with Hayden Stoeckel, Christian Sprenger and James Magnussen. Australia cinched bronze in the final, behind the US who claimed gold and only 0.32 of a second behind Japan.

== Modeling career ==
In 2012 Targett launched his career as a male model, signing with Melbourne editorial agency Chadwick Models.

== See also ==
- List of Olympic medalists in swimming (men)
