= David Cumberlidge =

English swimmer

Personal information
- Citizenship: British
- Born: 16 July 1996 (age 29)
- Education: University of Edinburgh
- Height: 6 ft 7 in (201 cm)

Sport
- Country: Great Britain; England
- Sport: Swimming
- University team: University of Edinburgh

Achievements and titles
- National finals: 2018
- Commonwealth finals: 2018
Medal record
Representing England
Commonwealth Games
Silver medal – second place	2018 Gold Coast	4 × 100 m freestyle relay
Representing Great Britain
Summer Universiade
Gold medal – first place	2019 Naples	50 m freestyle

David Cumberlidge (born 16 July 1996) is an English swimmer who won a silver medal in the Men's 4 × 100 metre freestyle relay at the 2018 Commonwealth Games in Gold Coast, Australia, and a gold medal in the 50m freestyle event at the 2019 Summer Universiade.

== Career ==
Cumberlidge gave up swimming at the age of 14, but returned to swimming aged 17. In 2015, Cumberlidge joined the University of Edinburgh swimming team. Cumberlidge won the 50m freestyle event at the 2016 and 2017 British Summer Championships. His 2017 time of 22.03 was a personal best, the fourth best time ever by a Briton, and quicker than the qualifying time for the 2018 Commonwealth Games. Cumberlidge won the 50m freestyle event at the 2018 British Swimming Championships in Edinburgh.

Cumberlidge, Ben Proud, Jarvis Parkinson, and James Guy won a silver medal in the Men's 4 × 100 metre freestyle relay at the 2018 Commonwealth Games in Gold Coast, Australia. Cumberlidge swam the opening split in 49.28 seconds. Cumberlidge also came fourth in the individual 50m freestyle event. Cumberlidge won a gold in the 50m freestyle event at the 2019 Summer Universiade. He was the fourth British swimmer in history to go under 22 seconds. He was part of the Swim England Performance Squad for the 2021–22 season.

== Personal life ==
As of 2021, Cumberlidge was a student of geothermal energy at the University of Edinburgh.
