= Douglas Erasmus =

South African swimmer (born 1990)

Personal information
- Full name: Douglas John Erasmus
- National team: South Africa
- Born: 4 April 1990 (age 36) Benoni, South Africa
- Height: 1.82 m (6 ft 0 in)
- Weight: 78 kg (172 lb)

Sport
- Sport: Swimming
- Strokes: Freestyle

Douglas John Erasmus (born 4 April 1990) is a South African swimmer who qualified to compete at the 2016 Summer Olympics held in Rio de Janeiro, Brazil.

== Personal life ==
Erasmus studied a Bachelor of Commerce (B.Com.) degree in Business management and Honers degree in Marketing management at the University of Pretoria.

== Swimming ==
Erasmus is coached by Igor Omeltchenko in Pretoria. He competed at the 2013 Summer Universiade games held in Kazan, Russia, reaching the semifinals of the 50 metre freestyle. At the 2014 Pan Pacific Swimming Championships, he raced in the 50 metre freestyle, 100 metre freestyle, the 4 × 100 metre freestyle relay, and the 4 × 100 metre medley relay. He was eliminated in the heats of both individual events. In both relays, he was part of South African quartets that finished seventh. During the meet, he injured his shoulder, which resulted in him missing four months of competition.

His results at the 2015 South African National Championships qualified him for the 2015 Summer Universiade games held in Gwangju, South Korea, in the 50 and 100 metre freestyle events. He advanced from the heats in both events but was eliminated in the semifinals, having placed seventh in the 50 metres race and eighth in the 100 metres. He represented South Africa at the 2015 African Games in Brazzaville, Republic of the Congo, winning gold medals in the 50 metre freestyle and the 4 × 100 metre freestyle relay.

At the 2016 South Africa Swimming Championships and Olympic trials, Erasmus was the fastest of over 100 competitors in the heats of the 100 metres freestyle event, setting a new personal best of 49.17 seconds. In the semifinals, he won his race in a time of 49.55 seconds. He eventually finished third in the final behind Calvyn Justus and Myles Brown. In the 50 metre freestyle event, Erasmus finished his heat in 22.16 seconds, one-hundredth of a second faster than the Olympic qualification standard. He finished second in the final behind Brad Tandy in a time of 22.55 seconds but ahead of four-time Olympian Roland Schoeman.

In May 2016, the South African Sports Confederation and Olympic Committee (SASCOC) named him as part of the South African team for the 2016 Summer Olympics held in Rio de Janeiro, Brazil, where he competed in the men's 50 metre freestyle event. He finished 29th in the heats with a time of 22.27 seconds and did not qualify for the semifinals.
