= Nicholas Grainger =

British swimmer

Nick Grainger
Personal information
- Full name: Nicholas Grainger
- National team: Great Britain
- Born: 3 October 1994 (age 31) Rotherham, England, United Kingdom
- Height: 199 cm (6 ft 6 in)

Sport
- Sport: Swimming
- Strokes: Freestyle
- Club: City of Sheffield
- Coach: Russ Barber
Medal record
Representing Great Britain
World Championships (LC)
Gold medal – first place	2015 Kazan	4x200 m freestyle
Gold medal – first place	2017 Budapest	4x200 m freestyle
Representing England
Commonwealth Games
Silver medal – second place	2018 Gold Coast	4x200 m freestyle

Nicholas Grainger (born 3 October 1994) is an English freestyle swimmer representing Great Britain at the FINA World Aquatics Championships. He has won two gold medals as part of a relay team at the World Championships.

== Early life ==
Grainger was born on 3 October 1994 in Rotherham, England. He studied at Sheffield Hallam University.

== Career ==
Grainger competed for City of Sheffield before being selected for the national team. He first competed in an international in the 2014 Commonwealth Games held in Glasgow, but only finished eighth in the 200m freestyle due to a back injury that affected his training before the games.

In 2015, Grainger qualified for the World Championships after finishing second in the final of the 400m freestyle at the British Swimming Championships. At the 2015 World Aquatics Championships, he failed to qualified for the 400m freestyle final, but he was part of team that won gold in the Men's 4 × 200m freestyle relay. He swam in the heats but not in the final.

At the 2017 World Aquatics Championships, Grainger won gold in the 4 × 200 m freestyle with James Guy, Stephen Milne and Duncan Scott.

At the 2018 Commonwealth Games held in the Gold Coast, Australia, Grainger was part of the team that won silver in the 4 × 200 m freestyle.
