= Barney McEvoy =

Australian rugby league player

Personal information
- Full name: Bernard McEvoy
- Born: 16 March 1933
- Died: 11 June 2016 (aged 83)

Playing information
- Position: Lock / Second-row
Club
Years	Team	Pld	T	G	FG	P
1956–59	North Sydney	51	10	0	0	30
1960–63	Manly Warringah	60	16	0	0	48
	Total	111	26	0	0	78
Representative
Years	Team	Pld	T	G	FG	P
1960	New South Wales	2	0	0	0	0
1960	NSW City	1	0	0	0	0

Bernard McEvoy (16 March 1933 – 11 June 2016) was an Australian rugby league player.

A lock and second-rower, McEvoy competed in first-grade for North Sydney from 1956 to 1959. He had his best season in 1960 after transferring to Manly Warringah, earning a place beside Ron Lynch on the New South Wales second-row for their interstate series against Queensland.

McEvoy was the grandfather of swimmer Cameron McEvoy.
