= Swimming at the 2018 Commonwealth Games – Men's 4 × 200 metre freestyle relay =

Men's 4 × 200 metre freestyle relay at the 2018 Commonwealth Games
- Venue: Gold Coast Aquatic Centre
- Dates: 8 April
- Competitors: 20 from 5 nations
- Winning time: 7:05.97

Medalists
| gold medal | Alexander Graham; Kyle Chalmers; Elijah Winnington; Mack Horton | Australia |
| silver medal | Cameron Kurle; Nicholas Grainger; Jarvis Parkinson; James Guy | England |
| bronze medal | Stephen Milne; Duncan Scott; Daniel Wallace; Mark Szaranek | Scotland |

The men's 4 × 200 metre freestyle relay event at the 2018 Commonwealth Games was held on 8 April at the Gold Coast Aquatic Centre.

== Records ==
Prior to this competition, the existing world and Commonwealth Games records were as follows.

| Record | Time | Athlete (nation) | Meet | Location | Date | Ref |
|---|---|---|---|---|---|---|
| World record | 6:58.55 | United States (USA) | | Rome, Italy | 31 July 2009 | |
| Commonwealth record | 7:01.65 | Australia (AUS) | | Rome, Italy | 31 July 2009 | |
| Games record | 7:07.38 | Australia | | Glasgow, United Kingdom | 27 July 2014 | |

The following records were established during the competition:

| Date | Event | Nation | Swimmers | Time | Record |
|---|---|---|---|---|---|
| 8 April | Final | Australia | Alexander Graham (1:46.60); Kyle Chalmers (1:46.47); Elijah Winnington (1:45.97); Mack Horton (1:46.93) | 7:05.97 | GR |

== Results ==
The final was held at 22:01.

| Rank | Lane | Nation | Swimmers | Time | Notes |
|---|---|---|---|---|---|
| 1st place, gold medalist(s) | 4 | Australia | Alexander Graham (1:46.60); Kyle Chalmers (1:46.47); Elijah Winnington (1:45.97); Mack Horton (1:46.93) | 7:05.97 | GR |
| 2nd place, silver medalist(s) | 3 | England | Cameron Kurle (1:47.63); Nicholas Grainger (1:47.61); Jarvis Parkinson (1:48.09); James Guy (1:45.24) | 7:08.57 | |
| 3rd place, bronze medalist(s) | 5 | Scotland | Stephen Milne (1:48.62); Duncan Scott (1:44.82); Daniel Wallace (1:48.69); Mark Szaranek (1:47.76) | 7:09.89 | |
| 4 | 6 | Canada | Jeremy Bagshaw (1:48.54); Markus Thormeyer (1:48.03); Yuri Kisil (1:49.72); Carson Olafson (1:47.83) | 7:14.12 | |
| 5 | 2 | Gibraltar | James Sanderson (2:03.10); Matt Savitz (2:02.39); Jordan Gonzalez (2:02.04); Aidan Carrol (2:08.22) | 8:15.75 | |
