= Swimming at the 2018 Commonwealth Games – Men's 4 × 100 metre freestyle relay =

Men's 4 × 100 metre freestyle relay at the 2018 Commonwealth Games
- Venue: Gold Coast Aquatic Centre
- Dates: 6 April
- Competitors: 57 from 12 nations
- Winning time: 3:12.96

Medalists
gold medal	Cameron McEvoy; James Magnussen; Jack Cartwright; Kyle Chalmers; James Roberts	Australia
silver medal	David Cumberlidge; Ben Proud; Jarvis Parkinson; James Guy; Elliot Clogg; Cameron Kurle	England
bronze medal	Duncan Scott; Jack Thorpe; Kieran McGukin; Stephen Milne; Craig McLean; Scott McLay; Daniel Wallace	Scotland

The men's 4 × 100 metre freestyle relay event at the 2018 Commonwealth Games as part of the swimming program took place on 6 April at the Gold Coast Aquatic Centre.

== Records ==
Prior to this competition, the existing world and Commonwealth Games records were as follows.

Record	Time	Athlete (nation)	Meet	Location	Date	Ref
World record	3:08.24	United States (USA)		Beijing, China	11 August 2008	
Commonwealth record	3:09.91	Australia (AUS)		Beijing, China	11 August 2008	
Games record	3:13.44	Australia		Glasgow, United Kingdom	25 July 2014	

The following records were established during the competition:

Date	Event	Nation	Swimmers	Time	Record
6 April	Heats	Australia	Cameron McEvoy (48.63); James Magnussen (47.87); Jack Cartwright (47.74); James Roberts (48.48)	3:12.72	GR

== Results ==
=== Heats ===
The heats were held at 11:54.

Rank	Heat	Lane	Nation	Swimmers	Time	Notes
1	2	4	Australia	Cameron McEvoy (48.63); James Magnussen (47.87); Jack Cartwright (47.74); James Roberts (48.48)	3:12.72	Q, GR
2	2	5	Scotland	Kieran McGuckin (49.55); Craig McLean (48.80); Scott McLay (48.79); Daniel Wallace (49.39)	3:16.53	Q
3	1	7	New Zealand	Daniel Hunter (49.58); Sam Perry (49.64); Corey Main (49.47); Matthew Stanley (49.27)	3:17.96	Q
4	1	2	England	David Cumberlidge (49.08); Elliot Clogg (49.83); Cameron Kurle (49.55); Jarvis Parkinson (49.53)	3:17.99	Q
5	1	4	Canada	Yuri Kisil (48.97); Ruslan Gaziev (49.78); Jeremy Bagshaw (50.61); Carson Olafson (49.94)	3:19.30	Q
6	1	5	Northern Ireland	Curtis Coulter (50.88); Calum Bain (50.26); David Thompson (49.51); Jordan Sloan (48.92)	3:19.57	Q
7	2	2	South Africa	Jarryd Baxter (51.00); Ryan Coetzee (50.47); Calvyn Justus (49.67); Eben Vorster (50.36)	3:21.50	Q
8	1	6	Sri Lanka	Matthew Abeysinghe (49.51); Akalanka Peiris (51.75); Cherantha de Silva (51.00); Kyle Abeysinghe (50.58)	3:22.84	Q, NR
9	2	3	Mauritius	Bradley Vincent (50.44); Gregory Anodin (52.56); Jonathan Chung Yee (59.94); Mathieu Marquet (51.64)	3:34.58	
10	2	7	Papua New Guinea	Josh Tarere (56.74); Samuel Seghers (52.54); Leonard Kalate (55.22); Ashley Seeto (58.79)	3:43.29	
11	2	6	Saint Helena	Duwaine Yon (1:00.45); Joshua Yon (1:02.80); Colbye Thomas (1:04.13); Ben Dillon (58.95)	4:06.33	
	1	3	Gibraltar	James Sanderson (54.02); Jordan Gonzalez; Matt Savitz; Aidan Carrol	DSQ	

=== Final ===
The final was held at 22:07.

Rank	Lane	Nation	Swimmers	Time	Notes
1st place, gold medalist(s)	4	Australia	Cameron McEvoy (48.91); James Magnussen (48.09); Jack Cartwright (47.71); Kyle Chalmers (48.25)	3:12.96	
2nd place, silver medalist(s)	6	England	David Cumberlidge (49.28); Ben Proud (48.35); Jarvis Parkinson (49.28); James Guy (48.34)	3:15.25	
3rd place, bronze medalist(s)	5	Scotland	Duncan Scott (48.54); Jack Thorpe (49.48); Kieran McGukin (49.19); Stephen Milne (48.65)	3:15.86	
4	3	New Zealand	Daniel Hunter (49.44); Sam Perry (48.60); Corey Main (49.90); Matthew Stanley (48.66)	3:16.60	
5	2	Canada	Yuri Kisil (48.94); Markus Thormeyer (48.73); Ruslan Gaziev (49.38); Carson Olafson (49.93)	3:16.98	
6	1	South Africa	Calvyn Justus (49.98); Chad le Clos (47.97); Brad Tandy (49.36); Ryan Coetzee (49.96)	3:17.27	
7	7	Northern Ireland	Jordan Sloan (49.87); Calum Bain (50.21); David Thompson (48.64); Curtis Coulter (51.31)	3:20.03	
	8	Sri Lanka	Matthew Abeysinghe (49.53); Akalanka Peiris (52.19); Kyle Abeysinghe (50.79); Cherantha de Silva	DSQ	
