= Clément Lefert =

French swimmer (born 1987)

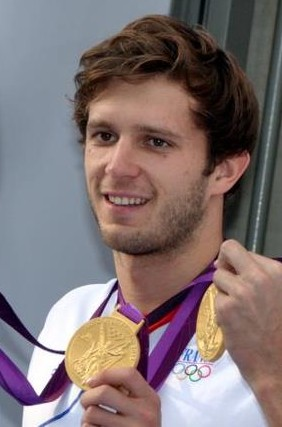

Personal information
- Full name: Clément Lefert
- Nationality: France
- Born: 26 September 1987 (age 39) Nice, France
- Height: 1.85 m (6 ft 1 in)
- Weight: 85 kg (187 lb)

Sport
- Sport: Swimming
- Strokes: Freestyle, butterfly
- Club: Olympic Nice
- College team: University of Southern California
Medal record
Men's swimming
Representing France
Olympic Games
Gold medal – first place	2012 London	4×100 m freestyle
Silver medal – second place	2012 London	4×200 m freestyle

Clément Lefert (born 26 September 1987 in Nice) is a retired French Olympic champion in swimming. He won a gold medal at the London 2012 Summer Olympics in the 4 × 100 meters freestyle relay, with teammates Amaury Leveaux, Fabien Gilot, and Yannick Agnel, besting the American relay team that included Michael Phelps. He also won a silver medal in the 4 x 200 meters freestyle relay. Lefert is an economics major at the University of Southern California (USC), and holds USC's record in the 200 yard freestyle (1:33.67).

On 1 January 2013, Lefert was made a Knight (Chevalier) of the Legion of Honour.

After finishing his higher education studies, he started as a trader in a commodities trading company in London.

== See also ==
- USC Trojans
- France at the Olympics
