= Cameron McEvoy =

Australian swimmer (born 1994)

Cameron McEvoy OAM
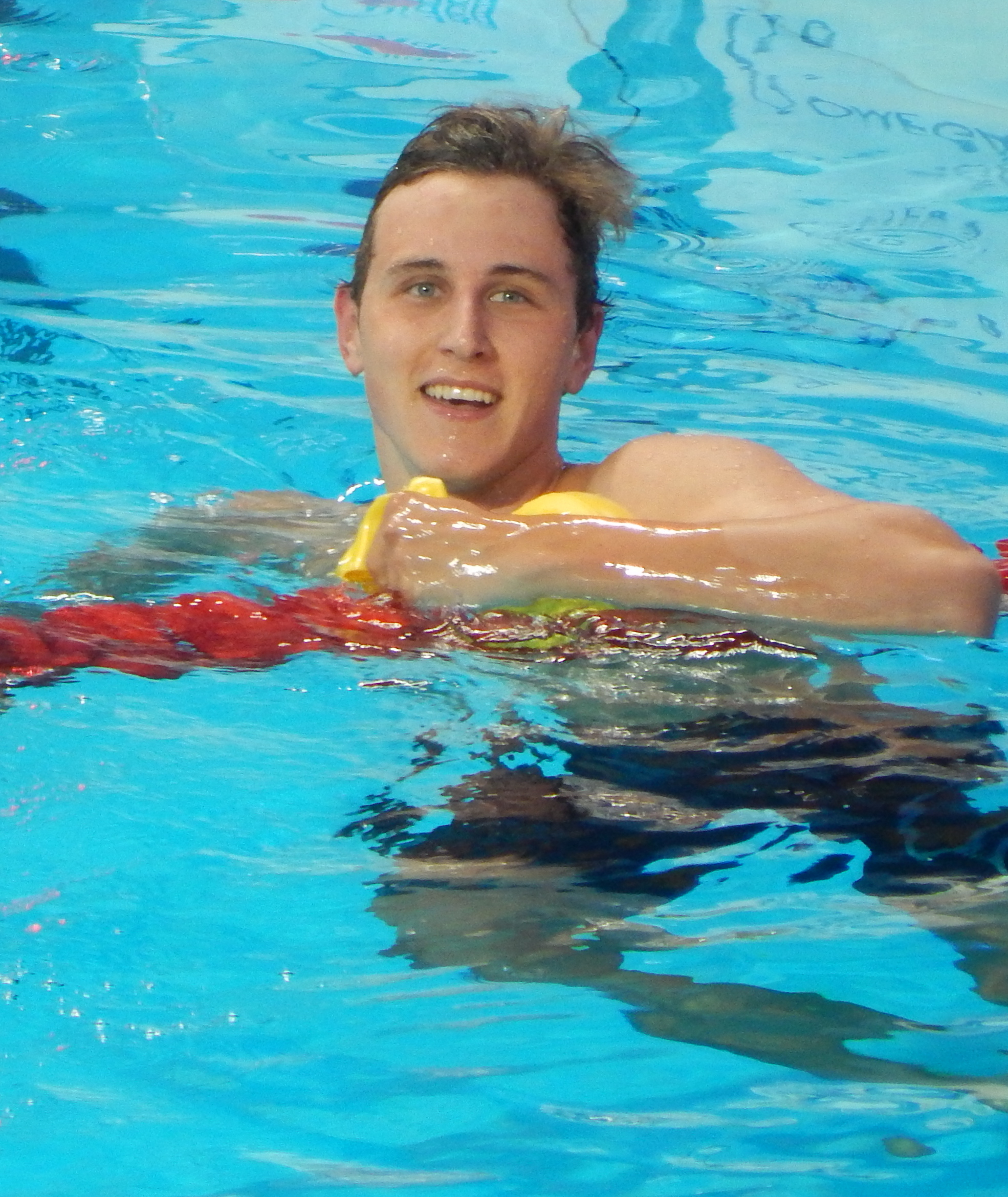
- McEvoy in Kazan, Russia 2015

Personal information
- Nicknames: "The Professor" "Big Boy McEvoy"
- National team: Australia
- Born: 13 May 1994 (age 32) Gold Coast, Queensland, Australia
- Height: 1.85 m (6 ft 1 in)
- Weight: 88 kg (194 lb)

Sport
- Sport: Swimming
- Strokes: Freestyle
- Club: Somerville House
- Coach: Tim Lane
Medal record
Men's swimming
Representing Australia
Olympic Games
Gold medal – first place	2024 Paris	50 m freestyle
Bronze medal – third place	2016 Rio de Janeiro	4×100 m freestyle
Bronze medal – third place	2016 Rio de Janeiro	4×100 m medley
Bronze medal – third place	2020 Tokyo	4×100 m freestyle
World Championships (LC)
Gold medal – first place	2023 Fukuoka	50 m freestyle
Gold medal – first place	2025 Singapore	50 m freestyle
Silver medal – second place	2013 Barcelona	4×100 m medley
Silver medal – second place	2015 Kazan	100 m freestyle
Silver medal – second place	2015 Kazan	4×100 m medley
Silver medal – second place	2019 Gwangju	4×100 m mixed freestyle
Silver medal – second place	2024 Doha	50 m freestyle
Bronze medal – third place	2015 Kazan	4×200 m freestyle
Bronze medal – third place	2019 Gwangju	4×100 m freestyle
Bronze medal – third place	2024 Doha	50 m butterfly
Pan Pacific Championships
Gold medal – first place	2014 Gold Coast	100 m freestyle
Gold medal – first place	2014 Gold Coast	4×100 m freestyle
Bronze medal – third place	2014 Gold Coast	200 m freestyle
Bronze medal – third place	2014 Gold Coast	4×200 m freestyle
Bronze medal – third place	2014 Gold Coast	4×100 m medley
Commonwealth Games
Gold medal – first place	2014 Glasgow	4×100 m freestyle
Gold medal – first place	2014 Glasgow	4×200 m freestyle
Gold medal – first place	2018 Gold Coast	4×100 m freestyle
Gold medal – first place	2026 Glasgow	50 m freestyle
Silver medal – second place	2014 Glasgow	50 m freestyle
Silver medal – second place	2014 Glasgow	100 m freestyle
Silver medal – second place	2014 Glasgow	200 m freestyle
Silver medal – second place	2014 Glasgow	4×100 m medley
Bronze medal – third place	2018 Gold Coast	50 m freestyle
Bronze medal – third place	2026 Glasgow	50 m butterfly
World Junior Championships
Gold medal – first place	2011 Lima	50 m freestyle
Gold medal – first place	2011 Lima	100 m freestyle
Bronze medal – third place	2011 Lima	200 m freestyle

Cameron McEvoy (born 13 May 1994) is an Australian competitive swimmer who represented his country at the 2012, 2016, 2020 and 2024 Summer Olympics. He is the reigning Olympic champion in the men's 50 m freestyle, and is also the first Australian man to win an Olympic medal in the event. He is the world record holder in the long course 50 m freestyle.

McEvoy's main event was initially the 100 m freestyle; he eventually won the silver medal in the event at the 2015 World Championships. At the 2016 Australian Championships, McEvoy broke the Australian record in the 100 m freestyle and set what was at the time, the fastest time in a textile suit. This made him the favourite for the event at the 2016 Olympics, however he would go on to finish seventh. After the 2020 Olympics, McEvoy overhauled his training program and started specialising in the 50 m freestyle. This led to a world title and Australian record in 2023, an Olympic gold medal in 2024, another world title in 2025 and a world record in 2026.

== Early life ==
Cameron McEvoy was born on 13 May 1994 on the Gold Coast, Australia. He learned to swim at the age of 5, and started training at the age of 7, at the Miami Swimming Club. He attended Emmanuel College, Gold Coast.

== Career ==
=== 2011–2013 ===
At the 2011 World Junior Championships in Lima, McEvoy won gold medals in the 50 m and 100 m freestyle, bronze in the 200 m freestyle, and bronze as part of the 4 × 200 m freestyle relay. Later in the year he competed at the Singapore stop of the 2011 Swimming World Cup, where he won gold in the 100 m freestyle.

In 2012, at 17 years old, McEvoy made his Olympic debut, representing Australia in the heats of the 4 × 100 m freestyle and 4 × 200 m freestyle relays in London. Australia went on to finish in fourth and fifth place, respectively.

McEvoy competed at the 2013 World Championships in Barcelona. On 28 July, McEvoy competed in the 4 × 100 m freestyle relay, splitting 47.44 on the second leg. Australia finished fourth overall, 0.14 seconds behind the bronze medalists. On 30 July, he swam in the 200 m freestyle final, recording a time of 1:46.63 to finish seventh. Two days later, he finished fourth in the 100 m freestyle in a time of 47.88. At the end of the competition, he swam the freestyle leg in the heats of the 4 × 100 m medley relay, splitting 47.85. He was replaced by James Magnussen in the final and won a silver medal after Australia finished second overall.

=== 2014–2015 ===
At the 2014 Commonwealth Games in Glasgow, McEvoy's first event was the 200 m freestyle. There, he won the silver medal with a time of 1:45.56. Later that night, he competed in the 4 × 100 m freestyle relay. South Africa had an early lead, and was still ahead at the 300 m mark. McEvoy swam 47.92 on the anchor leg, winning gold in a games record time of 3:13.44. On day 4 of competition, McEvoy competed in two events. The first of which was the 100 m freestyle, where he finished second with a 48.34 effort. Later that night, he swam in the 4 × 200 m freestyle relay, with the team winning gold in a games record time of 7:07.38. On the final day of competition, McEvoy again competed in two events. He won the silver medal in the 50 m freestyle with a time of 22.00. In the 4 × 100 m medley relay, he competed in the heats and was replaced by Magnussen in the final. McEvoy won another silver by virtue of the relay's second-place finish overall.

McEvoy later competed at the 2014 Pan Pacific Championships on the Gold Coast. On the first day, he posted 1:46.36 to win the bronze medal in the 200 m freestyle. The following day, he won the gold medal in the 100 m freestyle in a championship record time of 47.82. He closed out the second night with the 4 × 200 m freestyle relay, swimming the second leg and winning the bronze medal. On day 3, he anchored the 4 × 100 m freestyle relay, winning the gold medal in a close race between Australia, USA and Brazil. On the final day of competition, he won bronze in the 4 × 100 m medley relay and came fourth in the 50 m freestyle.

At the 2015 World Championships in Kazan, McEvoy's first individual event was the 200 m freestyle, where he finished eighth with a 1:47.26 effort. He later won the silver medal in the 100 m freestyle, with his time of 47.95 being 0.11 seconds slower than the gold medalist. He won bronze in the 4 × 200 m freestyle relay, leading off in 1:46.46. He concluded the championships with another silver in the 4 × 100 m medley relay, splitting 46.60 on the anchor leg.

In November 2015, McEvoy went 1:40.80 in the short course 200 m freestyle, breaking Ian Thorpe's Australian record of 1:41.10 from 2000.

=== 2016–2017 ===
At the Perth Aquatic Super Series in February 2016, McEvoy went 47.56 in the 100 m freestyle, improving his personal best by 0.09 seconds.

At the 2016 Australian Championships, McEvoy gained Olympic qualification in the 100 m freestyle with a time of 47.04. This was a new Australian record, surpassing Eamon Sullivan’s mark of 47.05 from 2008. It was also the fastest time in a textile suit, remaining so until 2019. He also qualified for the 50 m and 200 m freestyle events, recording a personal best time of 21.44 in the former.

In the weeks leading up to the Olympics, McEvoy withdrew from the 200 m freestyle.

In his first event at the 2016 Olympics, McEvoy swam in the 4 × 100 m freestyle relay. He anchored in 47.00 to the bronze medal. In a decision made by the Australian coaches, McEvoy was left off 4 × 200 m freestyle relay team. Despite going into the 100 m freestyle as favourite, McEvoy was unable to replicate his form from earlier in the year and finished seventh in a time of 48.12. The gold medal was won by compatriot Kyle Chalmers. Later in the week, McEvoy went 21.89 in the 50 m freestyle semifinals, missing out on qualification for the final. He participated in the heats of the 4 × 100 m medley relay and was replaced by Chalmers in the final. The team went on to win the bronze medal.

McEvoy competed at the 2017 World Championships in Budapest. His first event was the 4 × 100 m freestyle relay, where Australia initially finished fifth but was disqualified due to an early exchange. McEvoy finished fourth in the 100 m freestyle in a time of 47.92. McEvoy also competed in the 50 m freestyle, where he finished ninth in a time of 21.81.

=== 2018–2021: Move to Chris Nesbit ===
At the 2018 Commonwealth Games on the Gold Coast, McEvoy set the games record in the 4 × 100 m freestyle relay heats, with a time of 3:12.72. He swam the first leg in the final, winning the gold medal in a time of 3:12.96. Individually, he won bronze in the 50 m freestyle and came fourth in the 100 m freestyle.

McEvoy left longtime coach Richard Scarce in June, later withdrawing from the Australian Pan Pacific Championships Trials as he was yet to decide on a new training base. In August, McEvoy joined Chris Nesbit's program at TSS Aquatic.

At the 2019 World Championships, McEvoy won bronze in the 4 × 100 m freestyle relay, splitting 48.44 on the first leg. He also swam the heats of the mixed 4 × 100 m freestyle relay, winning silver after the finals team finished second. Individually, he placed tenth in the 50 m freestyle.

At the 2020 Olympics in Tokyo, McEvoy swam the heats of the 4 × 100 m freestyle relay and was replaced by Matthew Temple in the final. McEvoy won bronze after the team finished third overall. He later finished twenty-ninth in the 50 m freestyle and twenty-fourth in the 100 m freestyle.

After the Tokyo Olympics, McEvoy took a 12-month hiatus from the sport.

=== 2022–2024: Move to Tim Lane, 50 m freestyle specialisation ===
During his break from swimming, McEvoy experimented with rock climbing. This exposed him to a degree of strength training that was not present in his previous training approach, as the swimming portion primarily consisted of aerobic exercise. This led to an overhaul of his training program and a decision to specialise in the 50 m freestyle. He reduced his training load from 30 km of swimming per week, to 2 km per week. He increased the intensity of his swimming sessions, which was enabled by a greater emphasis on strength training. McEvoy implemented these changes by moving to Tim Lane's program in Brisbane.

McEvoy returned to competition in October 2022, recording 22.82 in the 50 m freestyle. At the Sydney Open in May 2023, he went 21.85 in the heats of the 50 m freestyle. This was the fastest time by an Australian since 2017. McEvoy improved on the mark in the final, going 21.84.

At the 2023 Australian Trials in Melbourne, McEvoy qualified for the Fukuoka World Championships in the 50 m butterfly and 50 m freestyle. He went 23.08 in the 50 m butterfly heats, which was his first personal best in any event since 2016. He did another personal best in the final, recording 23.07. He also achieved a personal best in the 50 m freestyle heats, going 21.27 to rank him number 1 in the world for 2023.

Competing in Fukuoka, McEvoy did not advance to the semifinals of the 50 m butterfly, placing eighteenth. In the 50 m freestyle, he qualified fastest for the final with a personal best time of 21.25. The following day, he won the gold medal in a time of 21.06, breaking Ashley Callus’ Australian record of 21.19 from 2009.

In February 2024, McEvoy competed at the 2024 World Championships in Doha. He won the bronze medal in the 50 m butterfly in a time of 23.08. He later won a silver medal in the 50 m freestyle, posting a time of 21.45 to finish 0.01 behind the gold medalist.

At the 2024 Australian Trials, McEvoy swam 21.35 to qualify for the 50 m freestyle at the Paris Olympics. He became the first male swimmer to represent Australia at 4 different Olympic Games.

He won the 50 m freestyle gold medal at the Paris Olympics in a time of 21.25, beating silver medalist Ben Proud by 0.05 seconds. This made him the first Australian man to win an Olympic medal in the event.

=== 2025–2026 ===
At the 2025 World Championships in Singapore, McEvoy won his second world title in the 50 m freestyle. He posted a 21.14 effort to finish 0.12 ahead of Proud.

In March 2026, McEvoy competed at the China Open in Shenzhen. He swam 20.88 in the 50 m freestyle, breaking the world record of 20.91 set by Brazil's César Cielo in 2009. Two days later, McEvoy finished fourth in the 50 m butterfly with a personal best time of 23.05. This is the first time that the record was broken since the official ban of high-technology swimwear.

In June 2026, McEvoy competed at the Australian Trials in Sydney. He won the 50 m freestyle in a time of 21.32, and finished third in the 50 m butterfly with a personal best time of 22.92. He qualified for the Commonwealth Games, but opted out of the Pan Pacific Championships.

In July 2026, McEvoy competed at the Commonwealth Games in Glasgow. He won the gold medal in the 50 m freestyle in a time of 20.97, breaking Proud's games record of 21.30 from 2018; it was his first Commonwealth Games gold medal in an individual event. He later competed in the 50 m butterfly, winning the bronze medal in a time of 22.92, which tied his own personal best.

In August 2026, McEvoy resumed training for the 100 m freestyle, with the intention of gaining selection for the 4 × 100 m freestyle relay.

In October 2026, McEvoy competed at the World Aquatics Cup. The first leg was held in Baku. In the 50 m freestyle, he went 20.22, breaking Chalmers' Australian record of 20.68 from 2021. McEvoy then swam 45.36 in the 100 m freestyle, recording a new personal best. The second leg was held in Tashkent. In the 50 m freestyle, he went 20.13 to lower his own Australian record. He then went 45.24 in the 100 m freestyle to achieve another personal best. The final stop was held in Astana. He went 20.19 in the 50 m freestyle. He then lowered his 100 m freestyle personal best to 45.11.

== Personal life ==
McEvoy studied physics and mathematics at Griffith University. At the 2016 Olympic trials he gained attention by wearing a swim cap with the signal of two merging black holes to celebrate the first observation of gravitational waves that had been announced two months earlier. The year before he wore a cap showing a Feynman diagram of a positron and an electron annihilating.

McEvoy is the grandson of Barney McEvoy who played rugby league for New South Wales in 1960 and who played club rugby league for the North Sydney and Manly Warringah clubs.

In May 2021, McEvoy offered his house for A$1.5 million or the equivalent in bitcoin.

In February 2025, McEvoy was married in a private ceremony.

McEvoy has a son, born in July 2025.

== Career best times ==
=== Long course (50 m pool) ===
As of 31 October 2026

Event	Time	Meet	Location	Date	Notes	Ref.
50 m freestyle	20.88	China Open	Shenzhen, China	20 March 2026	WR	
100 m freestyle	47.04	Australian Championships	Adelaide, Australia	11 April 2016	CR	
200 m freestyle	1:45.46	Australian Championships	Brisbane, Australia	2 April 2014		

Legend: WR – World record; OC – Oceanian record; CR – Commonwealth record; NR – Australian record; e – equalled existing record;
Records not set in finals: h – heat; sf – semifinal; r – relay 1st leg; rh – relay heat 1st leg; b – B final; † – en route to final mark; so – swim-off; tt – time trial

=== Short course (25 m pool) ===
As of 31 October 2026

Event	Time	Meet	Location	Date	Notes	Ref.
50 m freestyle	20.13	World Cup	Tashkent, Uzbekistan	8 October 2026	OC	
100 m freestyle	45.11	World Cup	Astana, Kazakhstan	15 October 2026		
200 m freestyle	1:40.80	Australian Championships	Sydney, Australia	25 November 2015		

Legend: WR – World record; OC – Oceanian record; CR – Commonwealth record; NR – Australian record; e – equalled existing record;
Records not set in finals: h – heat; sf – semifinal; r – relay 1st leg; rh – relay heat 1st leg; b – B final; † – en route to final mark; so – swim-off; tt – time trial

== Awards and honours ==
- Order of Australia Medal: 2025
- The starting block used by McEvoy in his March 2026 world record was signed by him, and placed in a sports museum in Shenzhen

== See also ==
- List of World Aquatics Championships medalists in swimming (men)
- List of Commonwealth Games medallists in swimming (men)
