= Jarvis Parkinson =

English swimmer (born 1998)

Personal information
- National team: Great Britain
- Born: 20 August 1998 (age 27) Doncaster, England, United Kingdom
- Height: 185 cm (6 ft 1 in)

Sport
- Sport: Swimming
- Strokes: Freestyle, medley
- Club: Chelsea & Westminster
- Coach: Lisa Bates
Medal record
Representing Great Britain
European Games
Silver medal – second place	2015 Baku	200 m medley
Representing England
Commonwealth Games
Silver medal – second place	2018 Gold Coast	4x100 m freestyle
Silver medal – second place	2018 Gold Coast	4x200 m freestyle

Jarvis Parkinson (born 20 August 1998) is an English swimmer. He won a silver in individual medley as a junior at the European Games. In his first senior international appearance at the 2018 Commonwealth Games, he won two silver medals in freestyle relays.

== Early life ==
Parkinson is from Hatfield Woodhouse in Doncaster, South Yorkshire. He was a student at Trinity Academy in Thorne. He was given swimming lesson while young, and when he was eight, he started to swim competitively for Armthorpe Kingfishers. He was a member of Doncaster Dartes Swimming Club before he moved to train at Loughborough National Centre.

== Career ==
In 2015, when he was 16, he took part in the inaugural European Games in Baku, Azerbaijan, and won a silver in the 200m individual medley. In 2017, at the British Championships in Sheffield, he broke the English record for his age group in 200m individual medley, winning the event at under 2 minutes.

Parkinson made his first senior appearance in an international competition at the 2018 Commonwealth Games held at the Gold Coast, Australia. He first won a silver as part of the relay team that won silver in the 4x100m freestyle event. He won a second silver in the 4x200m freestyle.
