= Swimming at the 2010 South American Games – Men's 50 metre freestyle =

The Men's 50m freestyle event at the 2010 South American Games was held on March 28, with the heats at 10:00 and the Final at 18:00.

== Medalists ==
Gold	Silver	Bronze
Crox Acuña; Venezuela	Nicolas Oliveira; Brazil	Federico Grabich; Argentina

== Records ==
Standing records prior to the 2010 South American Games
World record	César Cielo (BRA)	20.91	São Paulo, Brazil	18 December 2009
Competition Record	José Meolans (ARG)	22.66	Buenos Aires, Argentina	17 November 2006
South American record	César Cielo (BRA)	20.91	São Paulo, Brazil	18 December 2009

== Results ==
=== Heats ===
Rank	Heat	Lane	Athlete	Result	Notes
1	2	4	Federico Grabich (ARG)	23.25	Q
2	2	5	Crox Acuña (VEN)	23.31	Q
3	3	4	Nicolas Oliveira (BRA)	23.34	Q
4	4	5	Juan Cambindo (COL)	23.50	Q
5	4	2	Jesus Casanova (VEN)	23.54	Q
6	3	5	Oliver Elliot Banados (CHI)	23.67	Q
7	4	4	Guilherme Roth (BRA)	23.69	Q
8	3	6	Rodrigo Caceres (URU)	23.81	Q
9	4	6	Martin Kutscher (URU)	24.00	
10	3	3	Juan Lisandro Monzon (ARG)	24.10	
10	4	3	Manuel Alonso Ericsson (PER)	24.10	
12	2	3	Daniel Cuellar (COL)	24.13	
13	2	1	Diego Zambrano Macias (ECU)	24.16	
14	3	2	Sebastian Arispe Silva (PER)	24.26	
15	4	7	Perry Lindo (AHO)	24.31	
16	2	6	Hycinth Cijntje (AHO)	24.45	
17	4	1	Jose Lobo Martinez (PAR)	24.55	
18	3	1	Jemal le Grand (ARU)	24.70	
19	2	2	Martin Tomasin Manattini (BOL)	24.72	
20	1	4	Diguan Pigot (SUR)	25.20	
21	3	8	Niall Roberts (GUY)	25.38	
22	3	7	Mario Navas Navarro (ECU)	25.41	
23	1	3	Fabian Binns (GUY)	25.58	
24	4	8	Raul Pereira de Souza (PAR)	25.91	
25	2	8	Armando Zayas Claure (BOL)	27.16	
	1	5	Jordy Groters (ARU)	DNS	
	2	7	Jair Boerenveen (SUR)	DNS	

=== Final ===
Rank	Lane	Athlete	Result	Notes
1st place, gold medalist(s)	5	Crox Acuña (VEN)	22.99	
2nd place, silver medalist(s)	3	Nicolas Oliveira (BRA)	23.00	
3rd place, bronze medalist(s)	4	Federico Grabich (ARG)	23.10	
4	1	Guilherme Roth (BRA)	23.27	
5	6	Juan Cambindo (COL)	23.57	
6	2	Jesus Casanova (VEN)	23.61	
7	8	Rodrigo Caceres (URU)	23.76	
8	7	Oliver Elliot Banados (CHI)	23.84	
