= Dieter Dekoninck =

Belgian swimmer (born 1991)

Personal information
- Nationality: Belgian
- Born: 28 January 1991 (age 35) Antwerp, Belgium

Sport
- Sport: Swimming
- Strokes: Freestyle
Medal record
European Championships (LC)
Silver medal – second place	2016 London	4x200 m freestyle
Bronze medal – third place	2016 London	4×100 m freestyle

Dieter Dekoninck (born 28 January 1991) is a retired Belgian swimmer, born in Antwerp. He competed for Belgium at the 2012 and 2016 Summer Olympics. On both occasions, he was part of the Belgian 4 × 100 m and 4 × 200 m freestyle relay teams. The years between 2012 and 2016 featured a range of injury-induced breaks.

Dekoninck began swimming at the age of 6 and made his international debut in 2009. He retired after the 2016 Olympics.
