= Takeru Sasaki =

Japanese baseball player (born 1996)

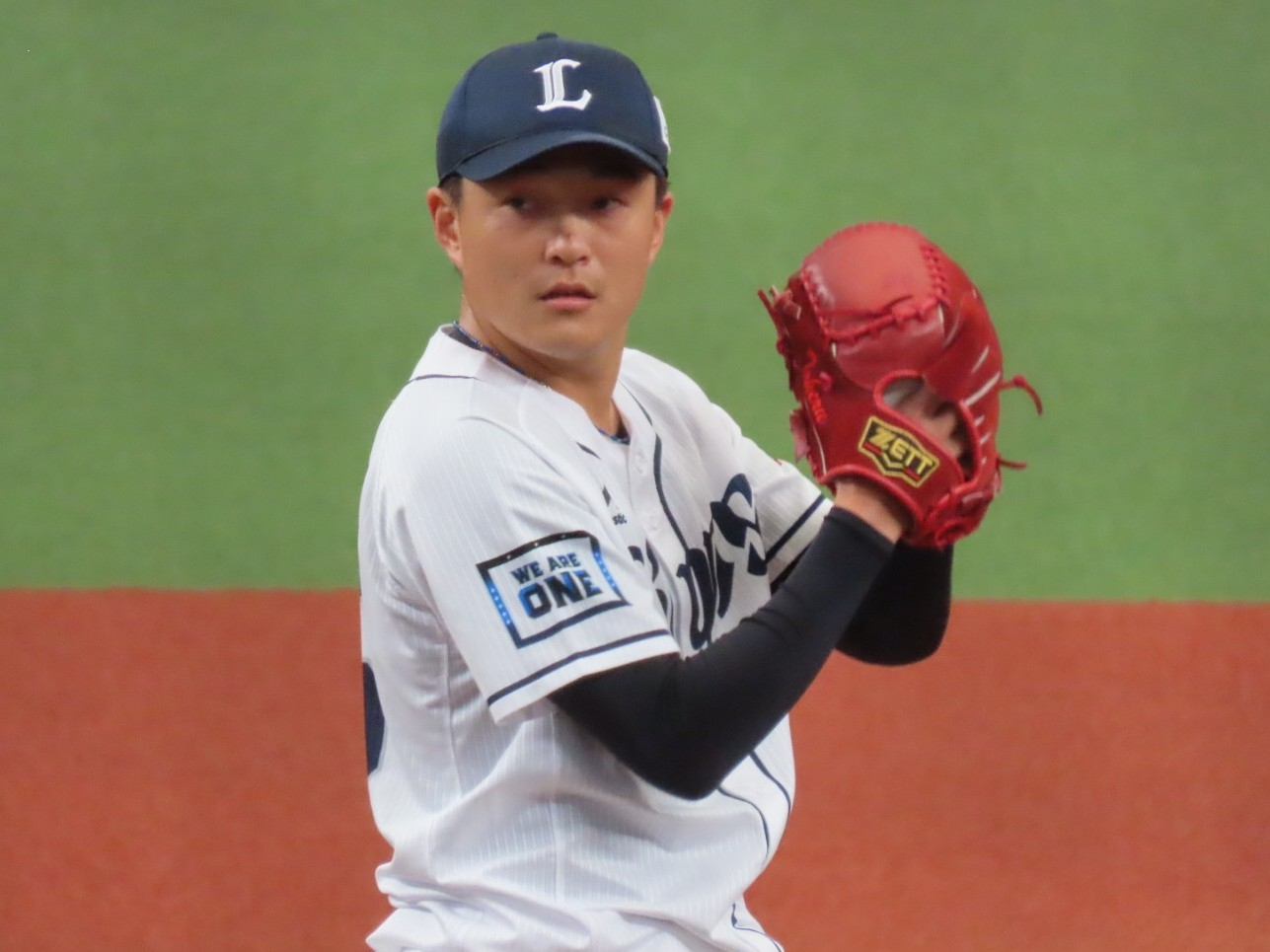
- Sasaki in 2022

Saitama Seibu Lions – No. 49
- Pitcher
- Born: May 13, 1996 (age 29); Aomori, Japan
- Bats: Left Throws: Left

NPB debut
- June 11, 2021, for the Saitama Seibu Lions

NPB statistics (through 2025 season)
- Win–loss record: 3–4
- Earned run average: 3.44
- Strikeouts: 49

Teams
- Saitama Seibu Lions (2021–present)

Takeru Sasaki (佐々木 健, Sasaki Takeru; born May 13, 1996) is a Japanese professional baseball pitcher for the Saitama Seibu Lions of Nippon Professional Baseball (NPB).

== Career ==
Sasaki was drafted by the Saitama Seibu Lions with the team's 2nd pick in the 2020 Nippon Professional Baseball draft.

On June 11, 2021, Sasaki made his NPB debut, pitching two scoreless innings against the Chunichi Dragons. On July 2, Sasaki became the first player in NPB history to be ejected while facing the first batter of the game. His 3rd pitch of the game hit Orix Buffaloes leadoff hitter Shuhei Fukuda in the head, which resulted in an automatic ejection. He finished his rookie campaign making 5 appearances, struggling to an 8.31 ERA with 4 strikeouts in 8 2/3 innings of work.

In 2022, Sasaki made 37 appearances for Seibu, posting a 3-0 record and 3.03 ERA with 24 strikeouts in 29 2/3 innings pitched.

Sasaki did not make an appearance for Seibu during the 2024 season. He returned to action in 2025, logging an 0-3 record and 5.02 ERA with eight strikeouts in 14 1/3 innings pitched across 15 appearances.
