= Bruno Fratus =

Brazilian swimmer (born 1989)

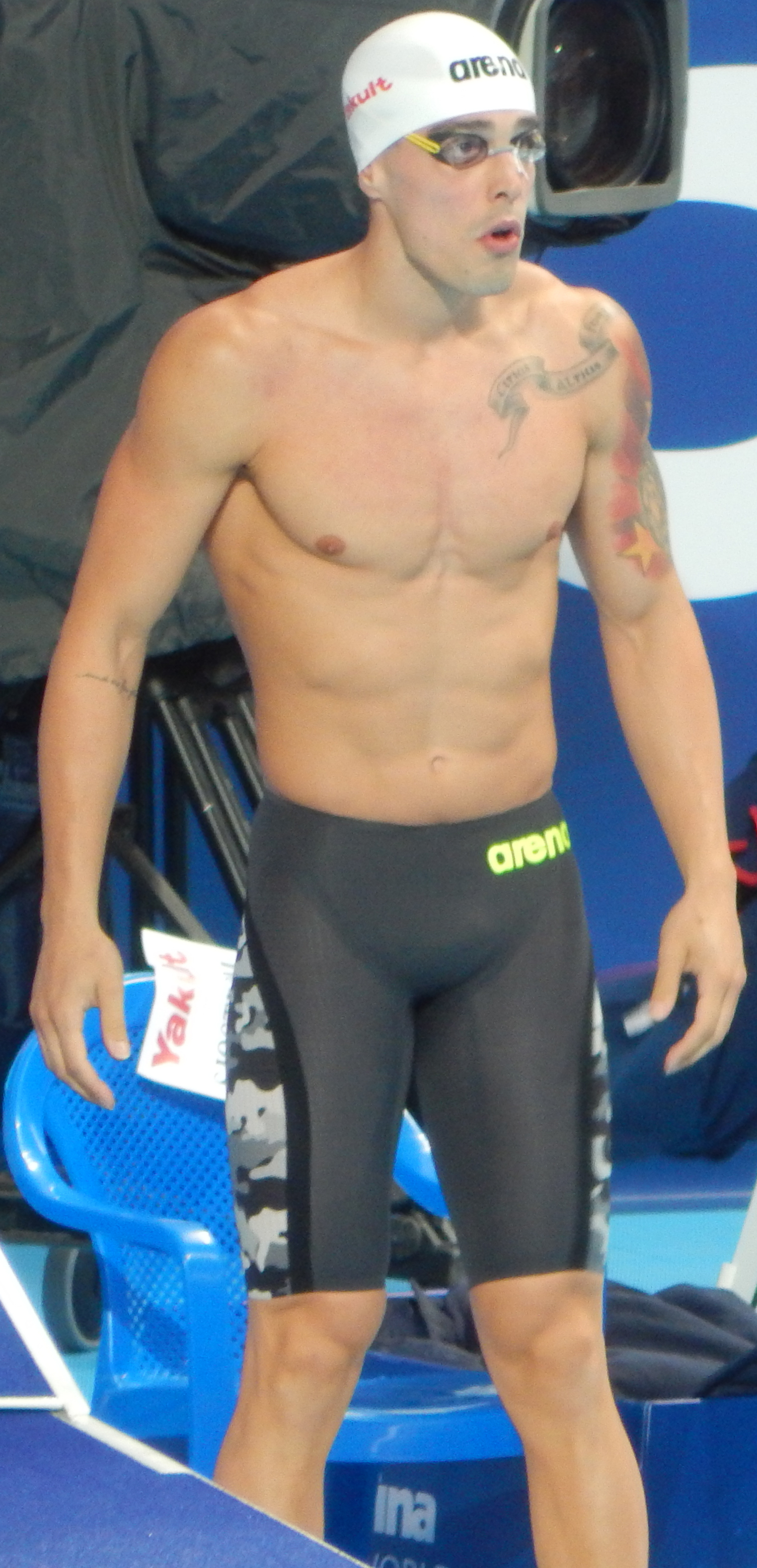
- Fratus at Kazan 2015

Personal information
- Full name: Bruno Giuseppe Fratus
- National team: Brazil
- Born: 30 June 1989 (age 37) Macaé, Rio de Janeiro, Brazil
- Height: 1.87 m (6 ft 2 in)
- Weight: 84 kg (185 lb)

Sport
- Sport: Swimming
- Strokes: Freestyle
- Club: Coral Springs Swim Club
- Coach: Michelle Lenhardt; Brett Hawke (former)
Medal record
Men's swimming
Representing Brazil
Event	1st	2nd	3rd
Olympic Games	0	0	1
World Championships (LC)	0	3	1
Pan Pacific Championships	1	0	1
Pan American Games	5	2	0
Total	6	5	3
Olympic Games
Bronze medal – third place	2020 Tokyo	50 m freestyle
World Championships (LC)
Silver medal – second place	2017 Budapest	50 m freestyle
Silver medal – second place	2017 Budapest	4×100 m freestyle
Silver medal – second place	2019 Gwangju	50 m freestyle
Bronze medal – third place	2015 Kazan	50 m freestyle
Pan Pacific Championships
Gold medal – first place	2014 Gold Coast	50 m freestyle
Bronze medal – third place	2014 Gold Coast	4×100 m freestyle
Pan American Games
Gold medal – first place	2011 Guadalajara	4×100 m freestyle
Gold medal – first place	2011 Guadalajara	4×100 m medley
Gold medal – first place	2015 Toronto	4×100 m freestyle
Gold medal – first place	2019 Lima	50 m freestyle
Gold medal – first place	2019 Lima	4×100 m freestyle
Silver medal – second place	2011 Guadalajara	50 m freestyle
Silver medal – second place	2015 Toronto	50 m freestyle
South American Games
Gold medal – first place	2014 Santiago	50 m freestyle
South American Championships
Gold medal – first place	2012 Belém	4×100 m freestyle
Silver medal – second place	2012 Belém	50 m freestyle
Silver medal – second place	2012 Belém	100 m freestyle

Bruno Giuseppe Fratus (born 30 June 1989) is a Brazilian former competitive swimmer. He won a bronze medal in the 50-metre freestyle at the 2020 Summer Olympics in Tokyo. In July 2021, Fratus became the first swimmer in history to swim the long course 50 metre freestyle race in less than 22 seconds 90 times. He surpassed this mark by swimming his 100th sub-22 second 50 metre freestyle at the 19th World Aquatics Championships in June 2022.

In the 50 metre freestyle, he won 3 medals in a row at the World Championships in 2015, 2017 and 2019 (2 silver and 1 bronze), in addition to having won silver in the 4×100 metre freestyle relay in 2017. He is also the gold medalist in the 50 metre freestyle at the 2014 Pan Pacific Championships and at the 2019 Pan American Games.

== International career ==
=== 2010–12 ===
At the 2010 Pan Pacific Swimming Championships in Irvine, California, United States, Fratus made his first major involvement in an international tournament, finishing 4th in 50 metre freestyle, with a time of 21.93 seconds. He also finished 25th in the 100 metre freestyle.

In the 2011 World Aquatics Championships held in Shanghai, China, Fratus made the fastest time in the semifinals of the 50 metre freestyle: 21.76 seconds. He finished 5th in the final, with a time of 21.96 seconds. At the 2011 Pan American Games in Guadalajara, Fratus won three medals: the gold medal in the 4×100 metre freestyle and medley relays, and the silver medal in the 50-metre freestyle.

In April 2012, disputing the Maria Lenk Trophy in Rio de Janeiro, Fratus earned the mark of 21.70 seconds in 50 metre freestyle.

=== 2012 Summer Olympics ===
At the 2012 Summer Olympics in London, Fratus reached the final of the 50 metre freestyle where he earned a fourth-place finish with a time of 21.61 seconds, touching the wall just 0.02 seconds after César Cielo, who won the bronze medal with a time of 21.59 seconds.

=== 2013–16 ===
In May 2013, Fratus underwent surgery to resolve an injury in his right shoulder, which lasted two years.

Fratus won a gold medal at the 2014 South American Games. In the men's 50 metre freestyle, he broke the competition record with a time of 22.12 in the heats. At the 2014 Maria Lenk Trophy, in São Paulo, he won a silver medal in the 50-metre freestyle with a time of 21.45, losing only to Cielo, who won with a time of 21.39.

At the 2014 Pan Pacific Swimming Championships in Gold Coast, Queensland, Australia, Fratus won a bronze medal in the Brazilian 4×100 metre freestyle relay, along with João de Lucca, Marcelo Chierighini and Nicolas Oliveira. The next day, he won the gold medal in the 50 metre freestyle, defeating Olympic champions Anthony Ervin and Nathan Adrian, breaking the Championship record, and beating his personal record with a time of 21.44.

In December 2014, at the Brazilian Open, in Rio de Janeiro, he swam lifetime best in the 100 metre freestyle, with a time of 48.57, and in the 50-metre freestyle, with a time of 21.41.

In April 2015, he competed in the Brazilian Long Course Championship (Maria Lenk Trophy) for Esporte Clube Pinheiros. He had a time of 21.74 in the qualifying of the 50 metre freestyle, being by then the second-best mark in the 2015 world ranking. He won the 50-metre freestyle final, beating César Cielo with the same time as the qualifying.

In July, Fratus competed in the Pan American Games, in Toronto. He won the gold medal in the 4×100-metre freestyle relay, together with Matheus Santana, João de Lucca, and Marcelo Chierighini. The team established a new Pan American Games record with a time of 3:13.66. Fratus also won the silver medal in the 50 metre freestyle.

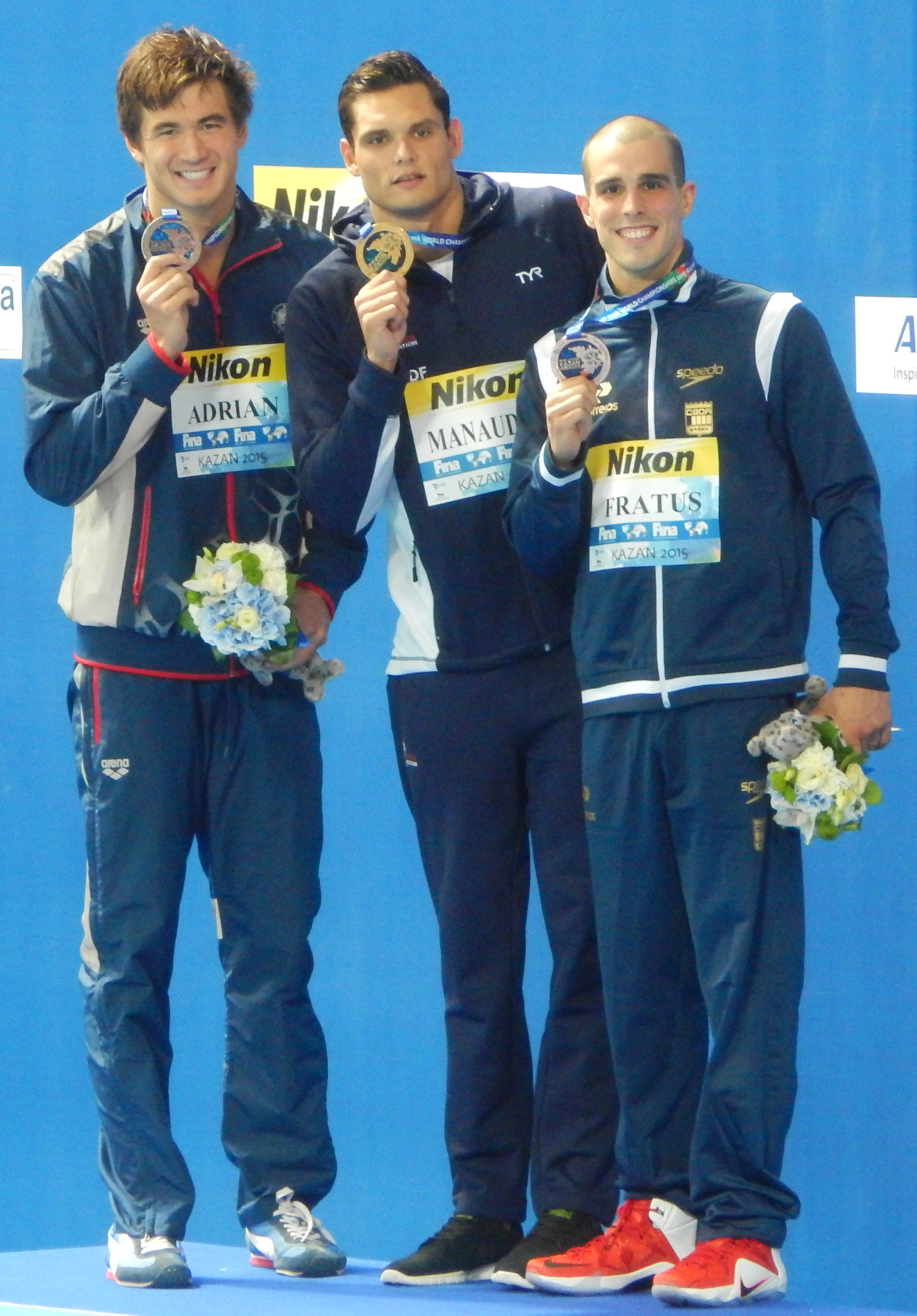
50m freestyle victory ceremony at Kazan 2015

At the 2015 World Aquatics Championships in Kazan, Fratus earned his first medal in World Championships in the Men's 50 metre freestyle, where he won the bronze, with a time of 21.55. He also finished 4th in the Men's 4 × 100 metre freestyle relay, along with Marcelo Chierighini, Matheus Santana and João de Lucca. César Cielo did not swim the final – despite being participating in the championship, he was feeling shoulder pain on this day; and 6th in the 4 × 100 metre mixed freestyle relay, along with Matheus Santana, Larissa Oliveira and Daynara de Paula, breaking the South American record with a time of 3:25.58.

At the Open tournament held in Palhoça, Fratus broke his personal record in the 50-metre freestyle with a time of 21.37.

=== 2016 Summer Olympics ===
At the 2016 Summer Olympics in Rio de Janeiro, Brazil, Fratus arrived as one of the favourites to win a medal in the Men's 50 metre freestyle. He qualified for the final, but he only finished in 6th place with a time of 21.79. In an interview, he said: "For some reason, I'm not able to swim faster than that. I have no idea what is happening. This year has been very bad. I have to review the program". Before the Games, Fratus was suffering from chronic back pain. The Brazilian Aquatic Sports Confederation (CBDA) even sent a physiotherapist to the United States, where Fratus lives and trains to accompany the athlete.

=== 2017–19 ===
At the 2017 World Aquatics Championships in Budapest, in the Men's 4 × 100 metre freestyle relay, the Brazilian team composed of Fratus, César Cielo, Marcelo Chierighini and Gabriel Santos achieved a historic result by winning the silver medal, the best Brazilian result of all time at World Championships in this race. Brazil beat the South American record of 2009, still in the super-suits era, with a time of 3:10.34, finishing 0.28 seconds after the gold-medal-winning team. The last medal of Brazil in this race, in World Championships, was obtained in 1994. In the Men's 50 metre freestyle, Fratus made the best time of his life in the race, 21.27, thus winning the silver medal. Fratus beat the best time of César Cielo in this race without the super-suits (21.32). He also helped Brazil's 4 × 100 metre medley relay to go to the final, swimming at heats. He registered his 59th and 60th sub-22-second long course 50-meter freestyles on 17 June 2018 at the Mare Nostrum Tour, passing country-mate and Olympic gold medalist Cesar Cielo as the most frequent 21-second sprinter in history.

In September 2018, Fratus underwent surgery to correct a partial rupture of the subscapularis tendon of the shoulder, missing out on important competitions.

Fratus only managed to retrain in good condition in February 2019. In April, managed to do the best time in the world in the 50m freestyle: 21.47. He won countless golds in the preparatory events in Europe and reached the World Championship with the three best times in the world at the moment: 21.31 (Mare Nostrum Monaco), 21.42 (Sette Colli) and 21.47.

At the 2019 World Aquatics Championships in Gwangju, South Korea, Fratus won the silver medal in the Men's 50 metre freestyle for the second time in a row, with a time of 21.45, losing only to Caeleb Dressel. In the Men's 4 × 100 metre freestyle relay, he finished 6th, helping Brazil qualify for the Tokyo 2020 Olympics.

At the 2019 Pan American Games held in Lima, Peru, Fratus won the gold medal in the Men's 50 metre freestyle, defeating Nathan Adrian, with a time of 21.61. He won another gold in the Men's 4 × 100 metre freestyle relay, breaking the Pan American Games record.

=== 2020 Summer Olympics ===
2020 Summer Olympics
Bronze medal – third place	50 m freestyle	21.57

At the 2020 Summer Olympics in Tokyo, Japan, Fratus qualified for his third Olympic final in the men's 50 metre freestyle with a time of 21.60 in the semifinals on 31 July 2021. This semifinal swim of 21.60 marked his 90th time swimming the 50 metre freestyle in less than 22 seconds, making him the first swimmer in history to do so. In the final on 1 August, Fratus won the bronze medal at the age of 32 with a time of 21.57 seconds, finishing just 0.02 seconds after silver medalist Florent Manaudou of France who touched the wall at 21.55 seconds. It was the fourth medal for Brazil in the history of the 50 metre freestyle at the Olympic Games. Fratus became the oldest pool swimmer in history to win their first Olympic medal. Fratus showing his joy for winning his first Olympic medal after debuting at the Olympic Games nine years earlier was highlighted by Reuters as one of the joyful emotional moments of the 2020 Summer Olympics.

== Personal life ==
Fratus trains in Coral Springs, Florida at the Coral Springs Aquatic Complex. Before 2019, Fratus trained under the guidance of coach Brett Hawke, and in 2019, Fratus switched coaches from Brett Hawke to Michelle Lenhardt, who continues to serve as his coach.

In 2014, Fratus married Michelle Lenhardt, who is also an Olympian swimmer and now serves as one of his coaches.

Shortly after winning the bronze medal in the 50 metre freestyle at the 2020 Summer Olympics, Fratus' celebration went viral. It was nearly identical to the "Bronze Medal" meme that first emerged in 2020, with the coincidences catching the eye of many on social media. It is not known if Fratus was initially aware of the meme, telling Portugal's Sport TV that his emotions were honest and he did not fake anything.

== International championships ==
Meet	50 freestyle	100 freestyle	4×100 freestyle	4×100 medley	4×100 mixed freestyle
PAC 2010	4th	25th			—N/a
WC 2011	5th	24th	9th	14th	—N/a
PAN 2011	2nd place, silver medalist(s)	11th (h)	1st place, gold medalist(s)	(gold) ^{[a]}	—N/a
SAC 2012	2nd place, silver medalist(s)	2nd place, silver medalist(s)	1st place, gold medalist(s)		—N/a
OG 2012	4th		9th		—N/a
SAG 2014	1st place, gold medalist(s)				—N/a
PAC 2014	1st place, gold medalist(s)		3rd place, bronze medalist(s)		—N/a
PAN 2015	2nd place, silver medalist(s)		1st place, gold medalist(s)		—N/a
WC 2015	3rd place, bronze medalist(s)		4th		6th
OG 2016	6th				—N/a
WC 2017	2nd place, silver medalist(s)		2nd place, silver medalist(s)	5th^{[a]}	
WC 2019	2nd place, silver medalist(s)		6th		
PAN 2019	1st place, gold medalist(s)		1st place, gold medalist(s)		
OG 2020	3rd place, bronze medalist(s)				
WC 2022	8th (sf)				

^{a} Fratus swam only in the preliminaries.

== Career best times ==
=== Long course metres (50 m pool) ===
As of 8 January 2022

Event	Time	Meet	Location	Date	Ref
50 m freestyle	21.27	2017 World Aquatics Championships	Budapest, Hungary	29 July 2017	
100 m freestyle	48.50	2017 Maria Lenk Trophy	Rio de Janeiro	4 May 2017	

=== Short course metres (25 m pool) ===
As of 8 January 2022

Event	Time	Meet	Location	Date	Ref
50 m freestyle	20.98	2020 International Swimming League	Budapest, Hungary	9 November 2020	
100 m freestyle	47.71	2020 International Swimming League	Budapest, Hungary	25 October 2020	

== Awards and honours ==
- Fratus was the recipient of the Key to the City of Coral Springs, Florida in October 2021.
- SwimSwam Swammy Award, South American Swimmer of the Year (male): 2021
- SwimSwam Top 100 (Men's): 2021 (#39), 2022 (#76)
