= Christoph Fildebrandt =

German swimmer

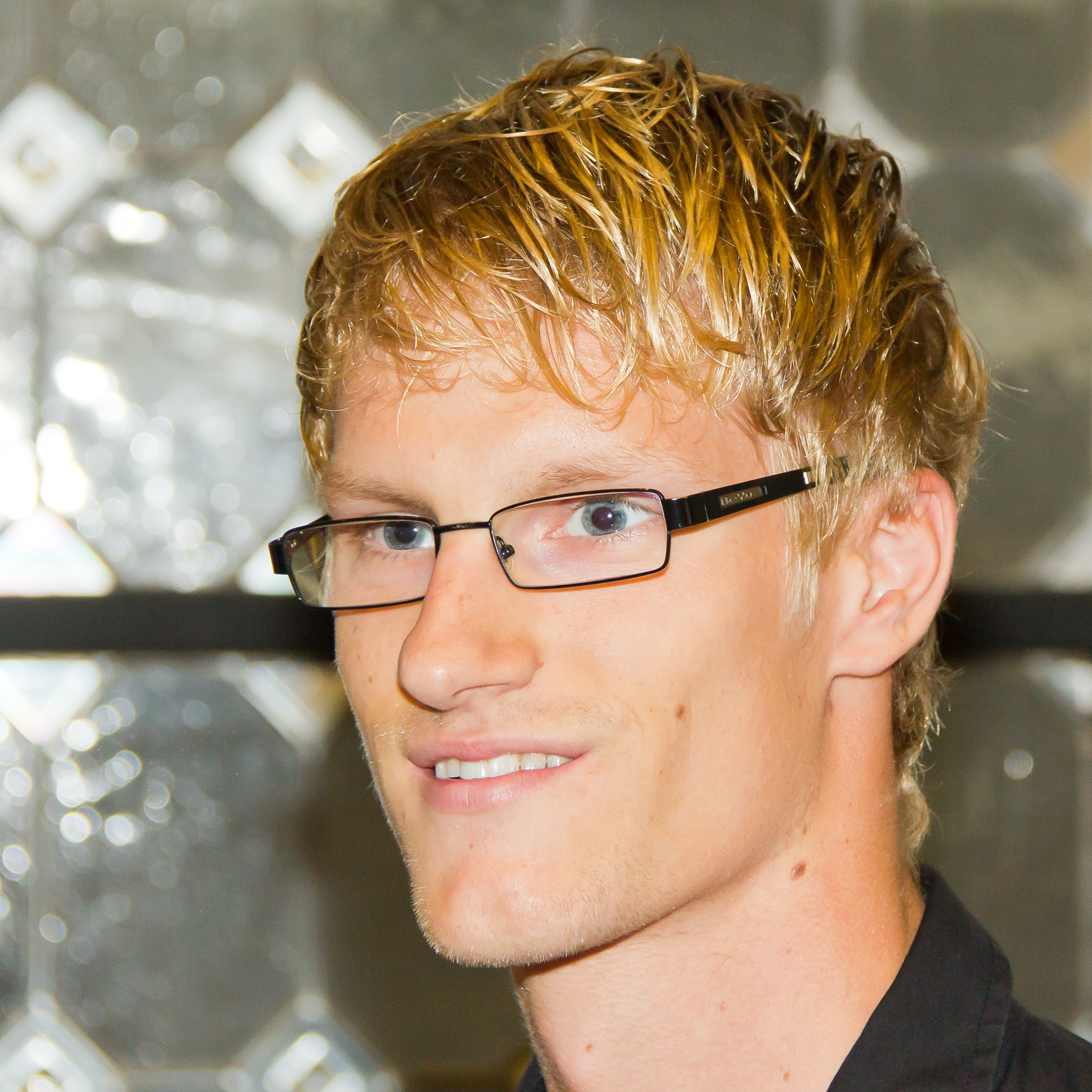
- Fildebrandt in 2012

Personal information
- Born: 27 May 1989 (age 37) Wuppertal, West Germany
- Height: 1.93 m (6 ft 4 in)
- Weight: 80 kg (176 lb)

Sport
- Sport: Swimming
- Club: TSM Bayer Dormagen
Medal record
Men's swimming
Representing Germany
World Championships (SC)
Bronze medal – third place	2012 Istanbul	4×200 m freestyle
European Championships (SC)
Silver medal – second place	2010 Eindhoven	4×50 m freestyle

Christoph Fildebrandt (born 27 May 1989) is a German swimmer. He won a silver and a bronze medal in freestyle relays at the European and world short-course championships in 2010 and 2012, respectively. At the 2012 Summer Olympics, his team finished sixth in the 4 × 100 m freestyle relay. At the 2016 Summer Olympics in Rio de Janeiro, he competed in the 200 m freestyle where he finished 28th in the heats and did not qualify for the semifinals. He also competed as part of the 4 x 200 freestyle relay team which finished in 6th place.
