= Marco di Carli =

German swimmer

Medal record

Men's swimming

Representing Germany

European Championships (LC)
Silver medal – second place	2012 Debrecen	4x100 m medley

Marco di Carli (born 12 April 1985 in Löningen, Lower Saxony, West Germany) is a German swimmer who specialisms are backstroke and freestyle. He swims at the SG Frankfurt club and is 1.89 metres (6 ft 2 in) tall and weighs 80 kg (180 lb).

== International career ==
He captured bronze in the 100m IM at the European Short Course Swimming Championships.
He competed for Germany at the 2004 Summer Olympics in Athens.

His personal best times are:

- 100 metres freestyle – 48"24 (German record)
- 50 metres backstroke – 25"53
- 100 metres backstroke – 54"76

== See also ==
- German records in swimming
