= Oliver Elliot =

Chilean swimmer (born 1987)

Personal information
- Full name: Oliver Eduardo Elliot Bañados
- Nationality: Chile
- Born: June 19, 1987 (age 39) Viña del Mar, Chile
- Height: 1.90 m (6 ft 3 in)
- Weight: 81 kg (179 lb)

Sport
- Sport: Swimming
- Strokes: Freestyle, Butterfly, Backstroke.
- Club: New York Athletic Club

Oliver Eduardo Elliot Bañados, born on June 19, 1987, in Viña del Mar, Chile, had an impressive career as a competitive swimmer. He specialized in freestyle events and represented Chile at two Olympic Games, the 2004 Athens Olympics and the 2008 Beijing Olympics. In Beijing, he competed in the men's 50-meter freestyle and finished 41st out of 97 swimmers. During his career, Elliot set national records in several disciplines, including the 50m freestyle (22.75 seconds), 50m butterfly (24.66 seconds), and 50m backstroke (26.20 seconds). He also participated in numerous prestigious international competitions, such as the World Long Course Swimming Championships in 2009, 2011, 2013, 2015, and 2017. Additionally, he competed in the World Short Course Championships, with appearances in 2014 in Doha, Qatar, 2016 in Ontario, Canada, and 2019 in Hangzhou, China, Pan American Games 2007, 2011 and 2019. Elliot earned medals at South American Games as well. After retiring from professional swimming, particularly due to the impact of COVID-19, Elliot transitioned into a career in sales and currently works as a Property Solution Specialist. He stays active in swimming and has been involved with the New York Athletic Club (NYAC) swim team in New York City..

In 2008, he joined the Pontifical Catholic University of Valparaíso School of Physical Education.
