= 2014 Pan Pacific Swimming Championships =

International swimming competition

- Host city: Gold Coast, Queensland, Australia
- Date: 21–25 August 2014
- Venue: Gold Coast Aquatic Centre
- Nations: 23
- Events: 36

The 2014 Pan Pacific Swimming Championships, also known as the 2014 Hancock Prospecting Pan Pacific Swimming Championships, a long course (50 m) event, was held in Gold Coast, Queensland, Australia, from 21 to 25 August 2014.

== Qualifying criteria ==
Unlike the World Championships and Olympic Games, nations can enter as many people as they like in the preliminaries of each event (in most international meets, only two swimmers from each nation are permitted). However, only two swimmers per nation can qualify for the semi-finals and finals. Prior to FINA's creation of semi-finals in the late 1990s, a total of 3 swimmers per country could qualify for the final and consolation heats of an event, with no more than 2 swimmers per country in a final or consolation.

For relays, each country may enter up to one team in each relay event to swim in the final heat and count toward the team score. Countries may also enter a “B” relay that will swim in a preceding heat. These “B” relays may not score points and are not eligible for medals. An NOC may enter up to 1 swimmer per sex (2 total), if they have no swimmers meeting any qualifying B standard.

== Participating nations ==
- Argentina
- Australia
- Brazil
- Canada
- Cayman Islands
- Chile
- China
- Chinese Taipei
- Ecuador
- Hong Kong
- Japan
- New Zealand
- Papua New Guinea
- Peru
- Philippines
- Singapore
- South Korea
- South Africa
- Trinidad and Tobago
- Tunisia
- United States
- Venezuela
- Zimbabwe

== Results ==
=== Men's events ===
Event	Gold		Silver		Bronze	
50 m freestyle	Bruno Fratus; Brazil	21.44 CR	Anthony Ervin; United States	21.73	Nathan Adrian; United States	21.80
100 m freestyle	Cameron McEvoy; Australia	47.82 CR	Nathan Adrian; United States	48.30	James Magnussen; Australia	48.36
200 m freestyle	Thomas Fraser-Holmes; Australia	1:45.98	Kosuke Hagino; Japan	1:46.08	Cameron McEvoy; Australia	1:46.36
400 m freestyle	Park Tae-hwan; South Korea	3:43.15	Kosuke Hagino; Japan	3:44.56	Connor Jaeger; United States	3:45.31
800 m freestyle	Ryan Cochrane; Canada	7.45.39	Mack Horton; Australia	7.47.73	Connor Jaeger; United States	7.47.75
1500 m freestyle	Connor Jaeger; United States	14:51.79	Ryan Cochrane; Canada	14:51.97	Mack Horton; Australia	14:52.78
100 m backstroke	Ryosuke Irie; Japan	53.02	Matt Grevers; United States	53.09	Ryan Murphy; United States	53.27
200 m backstroke	Tyler Clary; United States	1:54.91	Ryosuke Irie; Japan	1:55.14	Mitch Larkin; Australia	1:55.27
100 m breaststroke	Yasuhiro Koseki; Japan	59.62	Felipe França Silva; Brazil	59.82	Glenn Snyders; New Zealand	1:00.18
200 m breaststroke	Yasuhiro Koseki; Japan	2.08.57	Nic Fink; United States	2.08.94	Kazuki Kohinata; Japan	2.10.14
100 m butterfly	Michael Phelps; United States	51.29	Ryan Lochte; United States	51.67	Hirofumi Ikebata; Japan	52.50
200 m butterfly	Daiya Seto; Japan	1:54.92	Leonardo de Deus; Brazil	1:55.28	Tyler Clary; United States	1:55.42
200 m individual medley	Kosuke Hagino; Japan	1.56.02	Michael Phelps; United States	1.56.04	Daiya Seto; Japan	1.57.72
400 m individual medley	Kosuke Hagino; Japan	4:08.31	Tyler Clary; United States	4:09.03	Chase Kalisz; United States	4:09.62
4×100 m freestyle relay	Australia; Tommaso D'Orsogna (49.29); James Magnussen (47.68); Matthew Abood (48.23); Cameron McEvoy (47.60)	3:12.80	United States; Michael Phelps (48.88); Nathan Adrian (47.71); Anthony Ervin (48.57); Ryan Lochte (48.20)	3:13.36	Brazil; João de Lucca (49.05); Marcelo Chierighini (47.91); Bruno Fratus (48.00); Nicolas Oliveira (48.63)	3:13.59
4×200 m freestyle relay	United States; Conor Dwyer (1:47.08); Michael Phelps (1:46.08); Ryan Lochte (1:45.57); Matt McLean (1:46.44)	7:05.17	Japan; Kosuke Hagino (1:46.13); Reo Sakata (1:45.78); Yuki Kobori (1:46.81); Takeshi Matsuda (1:46.58)	7:05.30	Australia; David McKeon (1:46.85); Cameron McEvoy (1:48.12); Mack Horton (1:47.06); Thomas Fraser-Holmes (1:46.52)	7:08.55
4×100 m medley relay	United States; Matt Grevers (53.10); Kevin Cordes (58.64); Michael Phelps (50.60); Nathan Adrian (47.60)	3.29.94 CR	Japan; Ryosuke Irie (52.99); Yasuhiro Koseki (59.52); Hirofumi Ikebata (51.81); Katsumi Nakamura (47.76)	3.32.08	Australia; Mitch Larkin (53.46); Jake Packard (1:00.02); Tommaso D'Orsogna (52.34); Cameron McEvoy (47.63)	3.33.45
10 km open water	Andrew Gemmell; United States	1:51:11	Jarrod Poort; Australia	1:52:12	Kane Radford; New Zealand	1:52:13

=== Women's events ===
Event	Gold		Silver		Bronze	
50 m freestyle	Cate Campbell; Australia	23.96 CR, OC	Bronte Campbell; Australia	24.56	Chantal van Landeghem; Canada	24.69
100 m freestyle	Cate Campbell; Australia	52.72	Bronte Campbell; Australia	53.45	Simone Manuel; United States	53.71
200 m freestyle	Katie Ledecky; United States	1:55.74 CR	Bronte Barratt; Australia	1:57.22	Shannon Vreeland; United States	1:57.38
400 m freestyle	Katie Ledecky; United States	3:58.37 WR	Cierra Runge; United States	4:04.55	Lauren Boyle; New Zealand	4:05.33
800 m freestyle	Katie Ledecky; United States	8:11.35 CR	Lauren Boyle; New Zealand	8:18.87	Brittany MacLean; Canada	8:20.02
1500 m freestyle	Katie Ledecky; United States	15.28.36 WR	Lauren Boyle; New Zealand	15.55.69	Brittany MacLean; Canada	15.57.15
100 m backstroke	Emily Seebohm; Australia	58.84 CR	Belinda Hocking; Australia	59.78	Missy Franklin; United States	1:00.30
200 m backstroke	Belinda Hocking; Australia	2:07.49	Emily Seebohm; Australia	2:07.61	Elizabeth Beisel; United States	2:08.33
100 m breaststroke	Jessica Hardy; United States	1:06.74	Kanako Watanabe; Japan	1:06.78	Breeja Larson; United States	1:06.99
200 m breaststroke	Kanako Watanabe; Japan	2.21.41	Rie Kaneto; Japan	2.21.90	Taylor McKeown; Australia	2.22.89
100 m butterfly	Alicia Coutts; Australia	57.64	Lu Ying; China	57.76	Kendyl Stewart; United States	57.82
200 m butterfly	Cammile Adams; United States	2:06.61	Natsumi Hoshi; Japan	2:06.68	Katie McLaughlin; United States	2:07.08
200 m individual medley	Maya DiRado; United States	2.09.93 =CR	Alicia Coutts; Australia	2.10.25	Caitlin Leverenz; United States	2.10.67
400 m individual medley	Elizabeth Beisel; United States	4:31.99 CR	Maya DiRado; United States	4:35.37	Keryn McMaster; Australia	4:38.84
4×100 m freestyle relay	Australia; Cate Campbell (52.89); Brittany Elmslie (53.72); Melanie Schlanger (52.97); Bronte Campbell (52.88)	3:32.46 CR	United States; Simone Manuel (53.25); Missy Franklin (53.38); Abbey Weitzeil (53.81); Shannon Vreeland (53.79)	3:34.23	Japan; Miki Uchida (54.76); Misaki Yamaguchi (54.83); Yasuko Miyamoto (55.05); Yayoi Matsumoto (54.42)	3:39.06
4×200 m freestyle relay	United States; Shannon Vreeland (1:57.89); Missy Franklin (1:56.12); Leah Smith (1:58.03); Katie Ledecky (1:54.36)	7:46.40 CR	Australia; Bronte Barratt (1:58.07); Emma McKeon (1:55.85); Brittany Elmslie (1:56.92); Melanie Schlanger (1:56.63)	7:47.47	Canada; Brittany MacLean (1:57.67); Samantha Cheverton (1:58.70); Alyson Ackman (2:00.14); Emily Overholt (2:01.52)	7:58.03
4×100 m medley relay	Australia; Emily Seebohm (59.44); Lorna Tonks (1:07.44); Alicia Coutts (56.76); Cate Campbell (51.85)	3.55.49	United States; Missy Franklin (59.99); Jessica Hardy (1:06.35); Kendyl Stewart (57.62); Simone Manuel (53.45)	3.57.41	Canada; Brooklynn Snodgrass (1:00.48); Kierra Smith (1:08.09); Katerine Savard (57.46); Chantal van Landeghem (53.82)	3.59.85
10 km open water	Haley Anderson; United States	1:59:51	Eva Fabian; United States	1:59:52	Chelsea Gubecka; Australia	1:59:54

== Medal table ==
* Host nation (Australia)

Rank	Nation	Gold	Silver	Bronze	Total
1	United States (USA)	16	13	14	43
2	Australia (AUS)*	10	9	9	28
3	Japan (JPN)	7	8	4	19
4	Brazil (BRA)	1	2	1	4
5	Canada (CAN)	1	1	5	7
6	South Korea (KOR)	1	0	0	1
7	New Zealand (NZL)	0	2	3	5
8	China (CHN)	0	1	0	1
Totals (8 entries)		36	36	36	108
