= Matthew Abood =

Australian swimmer (born 1986)

Matt Abood
Personal information
- Full name: Matthew Abood
- Nickname: Boody
- Nationality: Australian
- Born: 28 June 1986 (age 40) Sydney, Australia
- Height: 1.97 m (6 ft 5 1/2 in)
- Weight: 90 kg (198 lb)

Sport
- Sport: Swimming
- Strokes: Freestyle
- Club: NSWIS
Medal record
Men's swimming
Representing Australia
Olympic Games
| Bronze medal – third place | 2016 Rio de Janeiro | 4×100 m freestyle |
World Championships (LC)
| Gold medal – first place | 2011 Shanghai | 4×100 m freestyle |
Pan Pacific Championships
| Gold medal – first place | 2014 Gold Coast | 4×100 m freestyle |
Commonwealth Games
| Gold medal – first place | 2014 Glasgow | 4×100 m freestyle |

Matthew Abood (born 28 June 1986) is a freestyle swimmer from Australia. He won the 4×100 m freestyle bronze medal with the Australian swimming team at the 2016 Olympics in Rio de Janeiro as well as the team gold medal at the 2011 World Championships in Shanghai.

Abood won the 50m national title in the 2009 Australian Swimming Championships beating the then reigning world record holder Eamon Sullivan. He regained the 50m national title at the 2011 Australian Swimming Championships and won gold in the 4 × 100 m freestyle relay at the World Championships.

In 2013, he won gold at the World Swimming Championships in the Mixed 4x50m freestyle relay category. He placed 5th at the 2013 World Aquatics Championships in the Men's 50m freestyle heats in Spain.

He won gold at the 2014 Pan Pacific Swimming Championships beating the US team led by Michael Phelps and a gold medal at the 2014 Commonwealth Games. He also placed 5th at the 2014 World Swimming Championships.

== Career best times ==
According to Swimming Australia, Abood's best times are as follows:

Long course

- 50 m Freestyle – 21.74 – 2009 World Championships, Rome
- 100 m Freestyle – 48.35 – 2009 World Championships, Rome

Short course

- 50 m Freestyle – 20.89 (Australian record holder) – 2009 FINA World Cup, Berlin
- 100 m Freestyle – 45.45 (Commonwealth record holder) – 2009 FINA World Cup, Singapore
