= Cullen Jones =

American swimmer

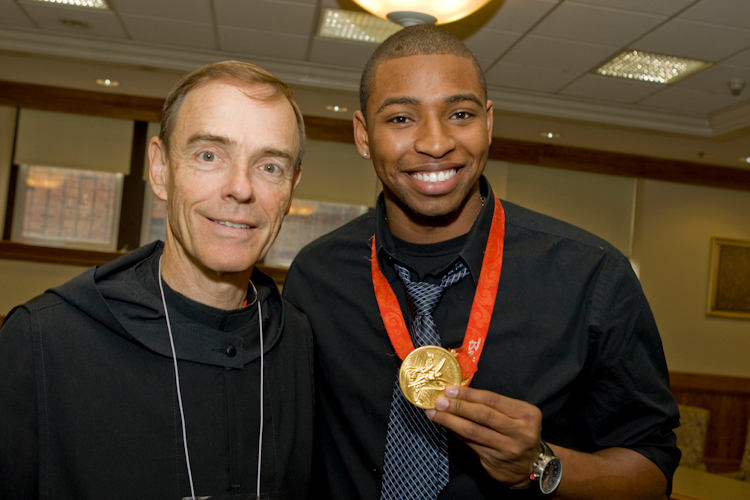
- Jones at St. Benedict's with Headmaster Fr. Edwin Leahy

Personal information
- Full name: Cullen Andrew Jones
- National team: United States
- Born: February 29, 1984 (age 42) New York City, New York, U.S.
- Height: 6 ft 5 in (196 cm)
- Weight: 210 lb (95 kg)

Sport
- Sport: Swimming
- Strokes: Freestyle
- Club: Wolfpack Elite
- College team: North Carolina State University
Medal record
Men's swimming
Representing United States
Event	1st	2nd	3rd
Olympic Games	2	2	0
World Championships (LC)	2	1	0
World Championships (SC)	0	1	1
Pan Pacific Championships	2	0	0
Pan American Games	0	0	1
Universiade	1	0	0
Total	7	4	2
Olympic Games
Gold medal – first place	2008 Beijing	4×100 m freestyle
Gold medal – first place	2012 London	4×100 m medley
Silver medal – second place	2012 London	50 m freestyle
Silver medal – second place	2012 London	4×100 m freestyle
World Championships (LC)
Gold medal – first place	2007 Melbourne	4×100 m freestyle
Gold medal – first place	2009 Rome	4×100 m freestyle
Silver medal – second place	2007 Melbourne	50 m freestyle
World Championships (SC)
Silver medal – second place	2006 Shanghai	50 m freestyle
Bronze medal – third place	2006 Shanghai	4×100 m freestyle
Pan Pacific Championships
Gold medal – first place	2006 Victoria	50 m freestyle
Gold medal – first place	2006 Victoria	4×100 m freestyle
Pan American Games
Bronze medal – third place	2015 Toronto	4×100 m freestyle
Universiade
Gold medal – first place	2005 Izmir	50 m freestyle

Cullen Andrew Jones (born February 29, 1984) is an American former competition swimmer and Olympic gold medalist who specialized in freestyle sprint events. As part of the American team, he holds the world record in the 4×100-meter freestyle relay (long course). At the 2012 Summer Olympics, he won silver medals in the 4 x 100-meter freestyle relay and the 50-meter freestyle, as well as the gold in the 4 x 100-metre medley.

== Childhood ==
Born on Leap day of 1984 in the Bronx borough of New York City, Jones moved to Irvington, New Jersey, while in elementary school. He learned to swim after he was rescued from a near-drowning at a splash-down pool at Dorney Park & Wildwater Kingdom in Pennsylvania when he was five years old. He became an age-group swimmer at Metro Express, a club team at the Jewish Community Center in West Orange, New Jersey under head coach Ed Nessel. Jones later switched teams to the Jersey Gators Swim Club in Cranford under Lou Petroziello. Jones graduated from Saint Benedict's Preparatory School in Newark in 2002. While there, he swam for coach Glenn Cassidy and set numerous Essex County swimming records.

== Swimming career ==
Jones attended North Carolina State University, where he studied English and swam for the NC State Wolfpack swimming and diving team in the National Collegiate Athletic Association (NCAA) competition from 2003 to 2006.

=== 2006 ===
He turned professional in the summer of 2006, after signing with Nike and burst onto the scene shortly after at the 2006 Pan Pacific Swimming Championships where he set a meet record in the 50-meter freestyle with a time of 21.84 seconds. He also swam a leg (split of 47.96) in the world record breaking 4×100-meter freestyle relay along with Michael Phelps, Neil Walker and Jason Lezak.

=== 2007 ===
In 2007, he also won a gold medal in 4×100-meter freestyle relay with the same teammates in the 2007 World Aquatics Championships.

=== 2008 Summer Olympics ===
2008 Summer Olympics
Gold medal – first place	4x100 m freestyle relay	3:08.24 (WR)

Jones is the first African-American to hold a world record (4×100-meter freestyle relay) in swimming. At the 2008 United States Olympic Trials, Jones broke the American record in the 50-meter freestyle with a time of 21.59. The record was subsequently broken the next day by Garrett Weber-Gale. At the 2008 Olympic Games in Beijing, China, he won a gold medal in the 4×100-meter freestyle relay in a world record time of 3:08.24 with Michael Phelps, Jason Lezak and Garrett Weber-Gale.

=== 2009 ===
In July 2009, Jones set the American record in the 50-meter freestyle at the U.S. National Championships in Indianapolis, Indiana.

=== 2012 ===
==== 2012 US Olympic Trials ====
At the 2012 United States Olympic Trials in Omaha, Nebraska, the qualifying meet for the 2012 Olympics, Jones made the Olympic team for the second time by finishing first in the 50-meter freestyle and second in the 100-meter freestyle, which subsequently qualified him for the 4×100-meter freestyle relay. In the 50-meter freestyle final, Jones won with a time of 21.59, one one-hundredth (0.01) of a second ahead of second-place finisher Anthony Ervin (21.60).

==== 2012 Summer Olympics ====
2012 Summer Olympics
Gold medal – first place	4x100 m medley relay	3:29.35
Silver medal – second place	50 m freestyle	21.54
Silver medal – second place	4x100 m freestyle relay	3:10.38

At the 2012 Summer Olympics in London, Jones won silver medals in the 50-meter freestyle and the 4×100-meter freestyle relay. He earned a gold medal in the 4×100-meter medley relay after swimming the freestyle leg in the preliminaries. He also competed in the 100-meter freestyle, but did not qualify for the event finals.

The 2012 U.S. Olympic swim team was the first U.S. Olympic swim team with more than one black swimmer on it, Jones made history with Anthony Ervin and Lia Neal by being the three African-Americans on the team.

== Personal bests (long course) ==
Event	Time	Date
50 m freestyle	21.40	July 2009
100 m freestyle	48.31	July 2008

Key: NR = National record

== See also ==
- Diversity in swimming
- List of Olympic medalists in swimming (men)
- List of United States records in swimming
- List of World Aquatics Championships medalists in swimming (men)
- List of world records in swimming
- World record progression 4 × 100 metres freestyle relay
