= 2010 FINA World Swimming Championships (25 m) – Records =

The following world and championship records swum at the 2010 Short Course Worlds, which were held December 15–19, 2010 in Dubai, United Arab Emirates.

== World records ==
Date	Event	Time	Name	Nation
December 15	Women's 4×200 m freestyle relay final	7:35.94	Chen Qian (1:54.73); Tang Yi (1:53.54); Liu Jing (1:53.59); Zhu Qianwei (1:54.08)	China
December 16	Men's 400 m individual medley final	3:55.50	Ryan Lochte	United States
December 16	Men's 4×200 m freestyle relay final	6:49.04	Nikita Lobintsev (1:42.10); Danila Izotov (1:42.15); Evgeny Lagunov (1:42.32); Alexander Sukhorukov (1:42.47)	Russia
December 17	Men's 200 m individual medley final	1:50.08	Ryan Lochte	United States

== Championship Records ==
Date	Event	Time	Name(s)	Nation
December 15	Men's 200 m freestyle heats	1:42.38	Ryan Lochte	United States
December 15	Men's 100 m breaststroke heats	57.74	Fabio Scozzoli	Italy
December 15	Men's 4×100 m freestyle relay heats	3:07.78	Evgeny Lagunov (46.89); Alexander Sukhorukov (46.82); Nikita Konovalov (47.38); Sergey Fesikov (46.69)	Russia
December 15	Men's 200 m freestyle final	1:41.08	Ryan Lochte	United States
December 15	Men's 100 m backstroke semifinals	49.62	Stanislav Donets	Russia
December 15	Women's 200 m butterfly final	2:03.59	Mireia Belmonte	Spain
December 15	Men's 100 m breaststroke semifinals	57.18	Mihail Alexandrov	United States
December 15	Women's 100 m backstroke semifinals	56.58	Gao Chang	China
December 15	Women's 400 m individual medley final	4:24.21	Mireia Belmonte	Spain
December 15	Men's 4×100 m freestyle relay final	3:04.78	Alain Bernard (46.78); Frédérick Bousquet (45.92); Fabien Gilot (45.75); Yannick Agnel (46.33)	France
December 15	Women's 4×200 m freestyle relay final (Women's 200 metre freestyle)	1:53.17	Camille Muffat	France
December 16	Men's 400 m individual medley heats	4:01.76	Ryan Lochte	United States
December 16	Women's 50 m butterfly heats	25.23	Therese Alshammar	Sweden
December 16	Women's 100 m individual medley heats	59.14	Ariana Kukors	United States
December 16	Men's 100 m backstroke final	49.07	Stanislav Donets	Russia
December 16	Women's 50 m butterfly semifinals	25.20	Felicity Galvez	Australia
December 16	Women's 50 m butterfly semifinals	25.19	Therese Alshammar	Sweden
December 16	Men's 50 m freestyle semifinals	20.61	César Cielo Filho	Brazil
December 16	Women's 100 m backstroke final	56.08	Natalie Coughlin	United States
December 16	Men's 100 m breaststroke final	56.80	Cameron van der Burgh	South Africa
December 16	Women's 100 m individual medley semifinals	58.65	Ariana Kukors	United States
December 17	Men's 50 m backstroke heats	23.24	Stanislav Donets	Russia
December 17	Men's 200 m breaststroke heats	2:04.46	Dániel Gyurta	Hungary
December 17	Women's 4×100 m medley relay heats	3:50.69	Gao Chang (56.41); Zhao Jin (1:04.72); Guo Fan (57.44); Li Zhesi (52.12)	China
December 17	Men's 50 m backstroke semifinals	23.02	Stanislav Donets	Russia
December 17	Women's 100 m freestyle final	51.45	Ranomi Kromowidjojo	Netherlands
December 17	Men's 50 m butterfly semifinals	22.57	Steffen Deibler	Germany
December 17	Men's 200 m breaststroke final	2:03.12	Naoya Tomita	Japan
December 17	Women's 50 m butterfly final	24.87	Therese Alshammar	Sweden
December 17	Women's 100 m breaststroke semifinals	1:04.17	Rebecca Soni	United States
December 17	Women's 400 m freestyle final	3:57.07	Katie Hoff	United States
December 17	Men's 50 m freestyle final	20.51	César Cielo Filho	Brazil
December 17	Women's 4×100 m medley relay final	3:48.29	Zhao Jing (56.52); Zhao Jin (1:04.20); Liu Zige (55.80); Tang Yi (51.77)	China
December 18	Men's 100 m freestyle heats	46.62	Fabien Gilot	France
December 18	Men's 100 m breaststroke heats	26.14	Cameron van der Burgh	South Africa
December 18	Women's 100 m breaststroke final	1:03.98	Rebecca Soni	United States
December 18	Men's 50 m backstroke final	22.93	Stanislav Donets	Russia
December 18	Women's 50 m backstroke semifinals (Equalled championship record)	26.37	Zhao Jing	China
December 18	Men's 100 m freestyle semifinals	46.01	César Cielo Filho	Brazil
December 18	Men's 50 m butterfly final	22.40	Albert Subirats	Venezuela
December 18	Men's 100 m individual medley semifinals	50.81	Ryan Lochte	United States
December 18	Women's 200 m individual medley final	2:05.73	Mireia Belmonte	Spain
December 18	Women's 4×100 m freestyle relay final	3:28.54	Femke Heemskerk (52.33); Inge Dekker (52.47); Hinkelien Schreuder (52.32); Ranomi Kromowidjojo (51.42)	Netherlands
December 19	Women's 200 m breaststroke heats	2:18.66	Rebecca Soni	United States
December 19	Men's 100 m freestyle final	45.74	César Cielo Filho	Brazil
December 19	Women's 50 m backstroke final	26.27	Zhao Jing	China
December 19	Men's 200 m backstroke final	1:46.68	Ryan Lochte	United States
December 19	Women's 200 m breaststroke final	2:16.39	Rebecca Soni	United States
December 19	Women's 100 m butterfly final	55.43	Felicity Galvez	Australia
December 19	Men's 50 m breaststroke final	25.95	Felipe Silva	Brazil
December 19	Women's 200 m freestyle final	1:52.29	Camille Muffat	France
December 19	Men's 4×100 m medley relay final (Men's 100 metre backstroke)	48.95	Stanislav Donets	Russia
December 19	Men's 4×100 m medley relay final	3:20.99	Nick Thoman (49.88); Mihail Alexandrov (56.52); Ryan Lochte (49.17); Garrett Weber-Gale (45.42)	United States

It is also possible for the swimmers in the first leg of the relays to break records. In the final of the women's 4×200 metre freestyle relay, Camille Muffat of France broke the championship record in the 200 metre freestyle. In the men's 4×100 metre medley relay, Russian swimmer Stanislav Donets broke the championship record in the 100 metre backstroke. Split times for swimmers not swimming the first leg are ineligible because the incoming swimmer can lean over in front of the blocks and be diving as the preceding swimmer is coming in, whereas the leadoff swimmer is timed from a stationary start.
