= Swimming at the 2010 Asian Games – Women's 50 metre breaststroke =

Women's 50 metre breaststroke at the 2010 Asian Games
- Venue: Aoti Aquatics Centre
- Date: 13 November 2010
- Competitors: 20 from 14 nations

Medalists
gold medal	Wang Randi	China
silver medal	Zhao Jin	China
bronze medal	Satomi Suzuki	Japan

The women's 50 metre breaststroke event at the 2010 Asian Games took place on 13 November 2010 at Guangzhou Aoti Aquatics Centre.

There were 20 competitors from 14 countries who took part in this event. Three heats were held, the heat in which a swimmer competed did not formally matter for advancement, as the swimmers with the top eight times from the entire field qualified for the finals.

Wang Randi and Zhao Jin from China won the gold and silver medal respectively, Japanese swimmer Satomi Suzuki won the bronze medal.

== Schedule ==
All times are China Standard Time (UTC+08:00)

Date	Time	Event
Saturday, 13 November 2010	09:32	Heats
Saturday, 13 November 2010	18:42	Final

== Records ==
Prior to this competition, the existing world, Asian and Games records were as follows.

World Record	Jessica Hardy (USA)	29.80	Federal Way, United States	7 August 2009
Asian Record	Chen Huijia (CHN)	30.46	Hong Kong	6 December 2009
Games Record	Ji Liping (CHN)	31.52	Doha, Qatar	2 December 2006

== Results ==
=== Heats ===
Rank	Heat	Athlete	Time	Notes
1	2	Zhao Jin (CHN)	31.14	GR
2	3	Wang Randi (CHN)	31.41	
3	1	Satomi Suzuki (JPN)	32.12	
4	1	Jeong Da-rae (KOR)	32.22	
5	2	Chen I-chuan (TPE)	32.59	
6	3	Yvette Kong (HKG)	32.92	
7	3	Back Su-yeon (KOR)	32.99	
8	3	Rie Kaneto (JPN)	33.11	
9	1	Lei On Kei (MAC)	33.17	
9	1	Fiona Ma (HKG)	33.17	
11	2	Christina Loh (MAS)	33.22	
12	3	Samantha Yeo (SIN)	33.53	
13	3	Erika Kong (MAS)	33.74	
14	2	Phiangkhwan Pawapotako (THA)	34.08	
15	2	Phạm Thị Huệ (VIE)	34.37	
16	1	Chavunnooch Salubluek (THA)	34.41	
17	1	Hem Thon Vitiny (CAM)	40.32	
18	2	Mary Al-Atrash (PLE)	40.58	
19	2	Gantömöriin Oyuungerel (MGL)	41.17	
20	3	Sara Al-Flaij (BRN)	44.66	

=== Final ===
Rank	Athlete	Time	Notes
1st place, gold medalist(s)	Wang Randi (CHN)	31.04	GR
2nd place, silver medalist(s)	Zhao Jin (CHN)	31.13	
3rd place, bronze medalist(s)	Satomi Suzuki (JPN)	31.52	
4	Jeong Da-rae (KOR)	31.98	
5	Chen I-chuan (TPE)	32.50	
6	Yvette Kong (HKG)	32.68	
7	Rie Kaneto (JPN)	32.85	
8	Back Su-yeon (KOR)	33.16	
