= Swimming at the 2010 Asian Games – Women's 100 metre breaststroke =

Women's 100 metre breaststroke at the 2010 Asian Games
- Venue: Aoti Aquatics Centre
- Date: 16 November 2010
- Competitors: 18 from 12 nations

Medalists
gold medal	Ji Liping	China
silver medal	Satomi Suzuki	Japan
bronze medal	Chen Huijia	China

The women's 100 metre breaststroke event at the 2010 Asian Games took place on 16 November 2010 at Guangzhou Aoti Aquatics Centre.

There were 18 competitors from 12 countries who took part in this event. Three heats were held, the heat in which a swimmer competed did not formally matter for advancement, as the swimmers with the top eight times from the entire field qualified for the finals.

Ji Liping and Chen Huijia from China won the gold and bronze medal respectively, Japanese swimmer Satomi Suzuki won the silver medal.

== Schedule ==
All times are China Standard Time (UTC+08:00)

Date	Time	Event
Tuesday, 16 November 2010	09:15	Heats
Tuesday, 16 November 2010	18:06	Final

== Records ==
Prior to this competition, the existing world, Asian and Games records were as follows.

World Record	Jessica Hardy (USA)	1:04.45	Federal Way, United States	7 August 2009
Asian Record	Ji Liping (CHN)	1:05.32	Beijing, China	29 August 2009
Games Record	Luo Xuejuan (CHN)	1:06.84	Busan, South Korea	1 October 2002

== Results ==
=== Heats ===
Rank	Heat	Athlete	Time	Notes
1	3	Satomi Suzuki (JPN)	1:09.23	
2	1	Jeong Da-rae (KOR)	1:09.26	
3	1	Ji Liping (CHN)	1:09.43	
4	3	Back Su-yeon (KOR)	1:10.19	
5	2	Rie Kaneto (JPN)	1:10.51	
6	2	Chen Huijia (CHN)	1:10.61	
7	2	Chen I-chuan (TPE)	1:11.99	
8	3	Yvette Kong (HKG)	1:12.12	
9	3	Lei On Kei (MAC)	1:12.96	
10	1	Fiona Ma (HKG)	1:13.00	
11	3	Samantha Yeo (SIN)	1:13.03	
12	2	Christina Loh (MAS)	1:13.50	
13	1	Erika Kong (MAS)	1:13.79	
14	1	Phiangkhwan Pawapotako (THA)	1:14.27	
15	2	Chavunnooch Salubluek (THA)	1:14.43	
16	3	Phạm Thị Huệ (VIE)	1:14.73	
17	2	Mahfuza Khatun (BAN)	1:22.85	
18	1	Gantömöriin Oyuungerel (MGL)	1:32.92	

=== Final ===
Rank	Athlete	Time	Notes
1st place, gold medalist(s)	Ji Liping (CHN)	1:06.91	
2nd place, silver medalist(s)	Satomi Suzuki (JPN)	1:07.43	
3rd place, bronze medalist(s)	Chen Huijia (CHN)	1:07.98	
4	Jeong Da-rae (KOR)	1:09.00	
5	Rie Kaneto (JPN)	1:09.66	
6	Back Su-yeon (KOR)	1:09.80	
7	Chen I-chuan (TPE)	1:11.20	
8	Yvette Kong (HKG)	1:12.41	
