= Swimming at the 2010 Asian Games – Women's 50 metre freestyle =

Women's 50 metre freestyle at the 2010 Asian Games
- Venue: Aoti Aquatics Centre
- Date: 16 November 2010
- Competitors: 26 from 18 nations

Medalists
gold medal	Li Zhesi	China
silver medal	Tang Yi	China
bronze medal	Yayoi Matsumoto	Japan

The women's 50 metre freestyle event at the 2010 Asian Games took place on 16 November 2010 at Guangzhou Aoti Aquatics Centre.

There were 26 competitors from 18 countries who took part in this event. Four heats were held, with two containing the maximum number of swimmers (eight). The heat in which a swimmer competed did not formally matter for advancement, as the swimmers with the top eight times from the entire field qualified for the finals.

Li Zhesi and Tang Yi from China won the gold and silver medal respectively, Japanese swimmer Yayoi Matsumoto won the bronze medal.

== Schedule ==
All times are China Standard Time (UTC+08:00)

Date	Time	Event
Tuesday, 16 November 2010	09:55	Heats
Tuesday, 16 November 2010	18:41	Final

== Records ==
Prior to this competition, the existing world, Asian and Games records were as follows.

World Record	Britta Steffen (GER)	23.73	Rome, Italy	2 August 2009
Asian Record	Le Jingyi (CHN)	24.51	Rome, Italy	11 September 1994
Games Record	Xu Yanwei (CHN)	25.23	Doha, Qatar	5 December 2006

== Results ==
Legend

- DSQ — Disqualified

=== Heats ===
Rank	Heat	Athlete	Time	Notes
1	4	Li Zhesi (CHN)	25.41	
2	3	Tang Yi (CHN)	25.55	
3	2	Yayoi Matsumoto (JPN)	25.75	
4	3	Hannah Wilson (HKG)	25.84	
5	4	Tomoko Hagiwara (JPN)	25.86	
6	3	Sze Hang Yu (HKG)	26.15	
7	2	Chui Lai Kwan (MAS)	26.21	
8	2	Amanda Lim (SIN)	26.36	
9	4	Mylene Ong (SIN)	26.40	
10	4	Natthanan Junkrajang (THA)	26.41	
11	3	Natsaya Susuk (THA)	26.66	
12	4	Jasmine Al-Khaldi (PHI)	26.75	
13	2	Leung Chii Lin (MAS)	26.97	
14	2	Ma Cheok Mei (MAC)	28.38	
15	3	Tan Chi Yan (MAC)	28.42	
16	1	Sabine Hazboun (PLE)	29.55	
17	2	Madhavi Kaushalya (SRI)	29.60	
18	4	Mary Al-Atrash (PLE)	30.57	
19	3	Aishath Sausan (MDV)	31.81	
20	2	Gantömöriin Oyuungerel (MGL)	32.28	
21	4	Jennet Saryýewa (TKM)	32.70	
22	1	Sara Al-Flaij (BRN)	32.73	
23	3	Hem Thon Vitiny (CAM)	33.01	
24	1	Veomany Siriphone (LAO)	34.75	
—	3	Lee Jae-young (KOR)	DSQ	
—	4	Bayan Jumah (SYR)	DSQ	

=== Final ===
Rank	Athlete	Time	Notes
1st place, gold medalist(s)	Li Zhesi (CHN)	24.97	GR
2nd place, silver medalist(s)	Tang Yi (CHN)	25.22	
3rd place, bronze medalist(s)	Yayoi Matsumoto (JPN)	25.67	
4	Hannah Wilson (HKG)	25.73	
5	Tomoko Hagiwara (JPN)	26.04	
6	Sze Hang Yu (HKG)	26.06	
7	Chui Lai Kwan (MAS)	26.08	
8	Amanda Lim (SIN)	26.15	
