= 2010 FINA World Swimming Championships (25 m) =

2010 swimming competition

10th Short Course Worlds
- Host city: Dubai, UAE
- Date: December 15–19, 2010
- Venue: Dubai Sports Complex
- Nations: 153
- Athletes: 780
- Events: 40

The 10th FINA World Swimming Championships (25 m) were held in Dubai, United Arab Emirates from 15 to 19 December 2010. This swimming-only championships took place in the Dubai Sports Complex; all events were swum in a 25-meter (short-course) pool.

FINA announced on April 9, 2006, that Dubai had defeated the only other bidder Istanbul, Turkey, 11 votes to 10, after a meeting of the FINA Bureau in Shanghai, China.

The USA topped the medal standings with a total of 25 medals. A total of 57 Championship Records, and 4 World Records were set. American Ryan Lochte and Spaniard Mireia Belmonte were named swimmers of the competition. Lochte became the first individual ever to win 7 medals at a Short Course Worlds, and became the first individual to swim a World Record since suits-rule changes went into effect in January 2010. Belmonte won a total of four medals, tied for the most with American Rebecca Soni.

== Participating nations ==
The entry list released on the FINA website before the championships contained 153 countries.

- Albania
- Algeria
- Andorra
- Angola (2)
- Armenia
- Argentina
- Australia (30)
- Austria (7)
- Azerbaijan
- Bahamas (3)
- Bahrain
- Barbados
- Belarus
- Belgium
- Benin
- Bolivia
- Bermuda
- Brazil
- Brunei
- Bulgaria (3)
- Burkina Faso
- Cambodia
- Canada (16)
- Cayman Islands
- Chile
- China
- Chinese Taipei
- Colombia
- Comoros
- Republic of the Congo
- Cook Islands
- Costa Rica
- Ivory Coast
- Croatia
- Cuba
- Cyprus
- Czech Republic
- Denmark
- Djibouti
- Dominican Republic
- Ecuador
- Egypt
- El Salvador
- Estonia (10)
- Ethiopia
- Faroe Islands
- Fiji
- Finland
- France (21)
- Georgia
- Germany (11)
- Gibraltar
- Great Britain (2)
- Greece
- Guam (4)
- Guinea
- Guyana
- Hong Kong
- Honduras
- Hungary
- Iceland
- Iraq
- Israel
- Italy
- Jamaica
- Japan (11)
- Jordan
- Kazakhstan
- Kenya (12)
- Kyrgyzstan
- Kuwait
- Laos
- Latvia (2)
- Lebanon
- Lithuania (2)
- Luxembourg (4)
- Macau
- Macedonia
- Madagascar
- Maldives
- Mali
- Malta (10)
- Marshall Islands
- Mauritania (2)
- Mexico (3)
- Federated States of Micronesia
- Moldova
- Mongolia
- Myanmar
- Namibia
- Nicaragua
- Netherlands
- Netherlands Antilles
- Nepal
- New Zealand
- Nigeria
- Northern Mariana Islands
- Norway
- Oman
- Pakistan
- Palestine
- Palau
- Panama
- Papua New Guinea
- Paraguay
- Peru
- Philippines
- Poland (7)
- Portugal
- Russia
- Rwanda
- Saint Lucia
- Saudi Arabia
- Senegal
- Serbia
- Seychelles
- Singapore
- Slovakia
- Slovenia
- South Africa (16)
- Spain
- Sri Lanka
- Sweden
- Switzerland
- Syria
- Tajikistan
- Thailand
- Togo
- Trinidad and Tobago
- Tunisia
- Turkey (9)
- Turkmenistan
- Uganda
- Ukraine
- United Arab Emirates
- United States (36)
- Uruguay
- Uzbekistan
- Venezuela (14)
- Vietnam (2)
- Zambia
- Zimbabwe

== Results ==
=== Men's events ===
Event	Gold		Silver		Bronze	
Freestyle
50 free	César Cielo Filho; Brazil	20.51; CR,AM	Frédérick Bousquet; France	20.81	Josh Schneider (United States) USA	20.88
100 free	César Cielo; Brazil	45.74; CR,SA	Fabien Gilot; France	45.97	Nikita Lobintsev; Russia	46.35
200 free	Ryan Lochte (United States) USA	1:41.08; CR	Danila Izotov; Russia	1:41.70	Oussama Mellouli; Tunisia	1:42.02
400 free	Paul Biedermann; Germany	3:37.06	Nikita Lobintsev; Russia	3:37.84	Oussama Mellouli; Tunisia	3:38.17
1500 free	Oussama Mellouli; Tunisia	14:24.16	Mads Glæsner; Denmark	14:29.52	Gergely Gyurta; Hungary	14:31.47
Backstroke
50 back	Stanislav Donets; Russia	22.93; CR	Sun Xiaolei; China and Aschwin Wildeboer; Spain	23.13	Not awarded	
100 back	Stanislav Donets; Russia	49.07; CR	Camille Lacourt; France	49.80	Aschwin Wildeboer; Spain	50.04
200 back	Ryan Lochte (United States) USA	1:46.68; CR	Tyler Clary (United States) USA	1:49.09	Markus Rogan; Austria	1:49.69
Breaststroke
50 breast	Felipe França Silva; Brazil	25.95; CR	Cameron van der Burgh; South Africa	26.03	Aleksander Hetland; Norway	26.29
100 breast	Cameron van der Burgh; South Africa	56.80; CR	Fabio Scozzoli; Italy	57.13	Felipe França Silva; Brazil	57.39
200 breast	Naoya Tomita; Japan	2:03.12; CR	Dániel Gyurta; Hungary	2:03.47	Brenton Rickard; Australia	2:04.33
Butterfly
50 fly	Albert Subirats; Venezuela	22.40; CR	Andrii Govorov; Ukraine	22.43	Steffen Deibler; Germany	22.44
100 fly	Yevgeny Korotyshkin; Russia	50.23	Albert Subirats; Venezuela	50.24	Kaio Almeida; Brazil	50.33
200 fly	Chad le Clos; South Africa	1:51.56	Kaio Almeida; Brazil	1:51.61	László Cseh; Hungary	1:51.67
Individual Medley
100 IM	Ryan Lochte (United States) USA	50.86	Markus Deibler; Germany	51.69	Sergey Fesikov; Russia	51.81
200 IM	Ryan Lochte (United States) USA	1:50.08; WR	Markus Rogan; Austria	1:52.90	Tyler Clary (United States) USA	1:53.56
400 IM	Ryan Lochte (United States) USA	3:55.50; WR	Oussama Mellouli; Tunisia	3:57.40	Tyler Clary (United States) USA	3:57.56
Relays
4 × 100; Free Relay	France; Alain Bernard (46.78); Frédérick Bousquet (45.92); Fabien Gilot (45.75); Yannick Agnel (46.33)	3:04.78; CR	Russia; Yevgeny Lagunov (46.68); Sergey Fesikov (45.87); Nikita Lobintsev (45.79); Danila Izotov (46.48)	3:04.82	Brazil; Nicholas Santos (47.33); César Cielo (45.08); Marcelo Chierighini (47.02); Nicolas Oliveira (46.31)	3:05.74; SA
4 × 200; Free Relay	Russia; Nikita Lobintsev (1:42.10); Danila Izotov (1:42.15); Evgeny Lagunov (1:42.32); Alexander Sukhorukov (1:42.47)	6:49.04; WR	(United States) USA; Peter Vanderkaay (1:43.83); Ryan Lochte (1:40.48); Garrett Weber-Gale (1:42.89); Ricky Berens (1:42.38)	6:49.58	France; Yannick Agnel (1:41.95); Fabien Gilot (1:42.55); Clément Lefert (1:45.01); Jérémy Stravius (1:43.54)	6:53.05
4 × 100; Medley Relay	(United States) USA; Nick Thoman (49.88); Mike Alexandrov (56.52); Ryan Lochte (49.17); Garrett Weber-Gale (45.42)	3:20.99; CR	Russia; Stanislav Donets (48.95) CR; Stanislav Lakhtyukhov (57.27); Evgeny Korotyshkin (49.39); Nikita Lobintsev (46.00)	3:21.61	Brazil; Guilherme Guido (50.69); Felipe França Silva (57.21); Kaio Almeida (50.09); César Cielo (45.13); Henrique Martins^{[a]} Nicolas Oliveira^{[a]} Glauber Silva^{[a]}	3:23.12; SA

^{a} Swimmers who participated in the heats only and received medals.

=== Women's events ===
Event	Gold		Silver		Bronze	
Freestyle
50 free	Ranomi Kromowidjojo; Netherlands	23.37	Hinkelien Schreuder; Netherlands	23.81	Arianna Vanderpool-Wallace (The Bahamas) Bahamas	24.04
100 free	Ranomi Kromowidjojo; Netherlands	51.45; CR	Femke Heemskerk; Netherlands	52.18	Natalie Coughlin (United States) USA	52.25
200 free	Camille Muffat; France	1:52.29; CR	Katie Hoff (United States) USA	1:52.91	Kylie Palmer; Australia	1:52.96
400 free	Katie Hoff (United States) USA	3:57.07; CR	Kylie Palmer; Australia	3:58.39	Federica Pellegrini; Italy	3:59.52
800 free	Erika Villaécija; Spain	8:11.61	Mireia Belmonte; Spain	8:12.48	Kate Ziegler (United States) USA	8:12.84
Backstroke
50 back	Zhao Jing; China	26.27; CR	Rachel Goh; Australia	26.54	Mercedes Peris; Spain	26.80
100 back	Natalie Coughlin (United States) USA	56.08; CR	Zhao Jing; China	56.18	Gao Chang; China	56.21
200 back	Alexianne Castel; France	2:01.67	Missy Franklin (United States) USA	2:02.01	Zhou Yanxin; China	2:03.22
Breaststroke
50 breast	Rebecca Soni (United States) USA	29.83	Leiston Pickett; Australia	29.84	Zhao Jin; China	29.90
100 breast	Rebecca Soni (United States) USA	1:03.98; CR	Leisel Jones; Australia	1:04.26	Ji Liping; China	1:04.79
200 breast	Rebecca Soni (United States) USA	2:16.39; CR	Sun Ye; China	2:18.09	Rikke Pedersen; Denmark	2:18.82
Butterfly
50 fly	Therese Alshammar; Sweden	24.87; CR	Felicity Galvez; Australia	24.90	Jeanette Ottesen; Denmark	25.24
100 fly	Felicity Galvez; Australia	55.43; CR	Therese Alshammar; Sweden	55.73	Dana Vollmer (United States) USA	56.25
200 fly	Mireia Belmonte; Spain	2:03.59; CR	Jemma Lowe (United Kingdom) Great Britain	2:03.94	Petra Granlund; Sweden	2:04.38
Individual Medley
100 IM	Ariana Kukors (United States) USA	58.95	Kotuku Ngawati; Australia	59.27	Hinkelien Schreuder; Netherlands	59.53
200 IM	Mireia Belmonte; Spain	2:05.73; CR	Ye Shiwen; China	2:05.94	Ariana Kukors (United States) USA	2:06.09
400 IM	Mireia Belmonte; Spain	4:24.21; CR	Ye Shiwen; China	4:24.55	Li Xuanxu; China	4:29.05
Relays
4 × 100; Free Relay	Netherlands; Femke Heemskerk (52.33); Inge Dekker (52.47); Hinkelien Schreuder (52.32); Ranomi Kromowidjojo (51.42)	3:28.54; CR	(United States) USA; Natalie Coughlin (51.88); Katie Hoff (52.79); Jessica Hardy (53.03); Dana Vollmer (51.64)	3:29.34	China; Tang Yi (52.27); Zhu Qianwei (52.60); Pang Jiaying (52.94); Li Zhesi (52.00)	3:29.81
4 × 200; Free Relay	China; Chen Qian (1:54.73); Tang Yi (1:53.54); Liu Jing (1:53.59); Zhu Qianwei (1:54.08)	7:35.94; WR	Australia; Blair Evans (1:54.87); Jade Neilsen (1:54.87); Kelly Stubbins (1:55.41); Kylie Palmer (1:52.42)	7:37.57	France; Camille Muffat (1:53.17) CR; Coralie Balmy (1:53.71); Mylène Lazare (1:56.24); Ophélie Etienne (1:55.21)	7:38.33
4 × 100; Medley Relay	China; Zhao Jing (56.52); Zhao Jin (1:04.20); Liu Zige (55.80); Tang Yi (51.77)	3:48.29; CR	(United States) USA; Natalie Coughlin (56.83); Rebecca Soni (1:03.73); Dana Vollmer (55.62); Jessica Hardy (52.18)	3:48.36	Australia; Rachel Goh (57.39); Leisel Jones (1:03.76); Felicity Galvez (55.56); Marieke Guehrer (52.17)	3:48.88

=== Medal table ===
Rank	Nation	Gold	Silver	Bronze	Total
1	United States (USA)	12	6	7	25
2	Russia (RUS)	4	4	2	10
3	Spain (ESP)	4	2	2	8
4	China (CHN)	3	5	6	14
5	France (FRA)	3	3	2	8
6	Netherlands (NED)	3	2	1	6
7	Brazil (BRA)	3	1	4	8
8	South Africa (RSA)	2	1	0	3
9	Australia (AUS)	1	7	3	11
10	Tunisia (TUN)	1	1	2	4
11	Germany (GER)	1	1	1	3
11	Sweden (SWE)	1	1	1	3
13	Venezuela (VEN)	1	1	0	2
14	Japan (JPN)	1	0	0	1
15	Denmark (DEN)	0	1	2	3
15	Hungary (HUN)	0	1	2	3
17	Austria (AUT)	0	1	1	2
17	Italy (ITA)	0	1	1	2
19	Great Britain (GBR)	0	1	0	1
19	Ukraine (UKR)	0	1	0	1
21	Bahamas (BAH)	0	0	1	1
21	Norway (NOR)	0	0	1	1
Totals (22 entries)		40	41	39	120

== Highlights ==
For a list of day-by-day highlights from the 2010 Short Course Worlds, please see:

- 2010 FINA World Swimming Championships (25 m) – Highlights

== Records ==
For a list of records set at the 2010 Short Course Worlds, please see this entry:

- 2010 FINA World Swimming Championships (25m) – Records

== Controversy ==
At the time of the event, Israel and the United Arab Emirates had no diplomatic relations; however, UAE officials said they would issue visas to the Israeli delegation attending the competition. As such, the Israeli delegation was eventually let into the country and were able to get to the Championships before racing actually started, but it was not without difficulties and several delays. Among the reported issue were that the Israelis were not issued visas nor were their passports stamped, and their arrival was delayed to just before competition started.

== Notes and references ==
Daily reports

- Dubai, Day 1: China sets first WR of the year and Spain gets first gold ever. FINA. Retrieved on 2010-12-15.
- Dubai, Day 2: Two more WR and tied match (3-3) between USA and Russia. FINA. Retrieved on 2010-12-16.
- Dubai, Day 3: Lochte imperial sets WR in the 200m IM. FINA. Retrieved on 2010-12-17.
- Dubai, Day 4: Belmonte Garcia (ESP), a new Star is born. FINA. Retrieved on 2010-12-18.
- Dubai, Day 5: Lochte (USA), first ever with 7 medals in one championships. FINA. Retrieved on 2010-12-19.

== See also ==
- 2010 in swimming
- List of World Championships records in swimming
