= Swimming at the 2006 Asian Games – Women's 50 metre breaststroke =

Women's 50 metre breaststroke at the 2006 Asian Games
- Venue: Hamad Aquatic Centre
- Date: 2 December 2006
- Competitors: 19 from 13 nations

Medalists
gold medal	Ji Liping	China
silver medal	Asami Kitagawa	Japan
bronze medal	Wang Qun	China

The women's 50m breaststroke swimming event at the 2006 Asian Games was held on December 2, 2006 at the Hamad Aquatic Centre in Doha, Qatar.

== Schedule ==
All times are Arabia Standard Time (UTC+03:00)

Date	Time	Event
Saturday, 2 December 2006	10:45	Heats
Saturday, 2 December 2006	18:39	Final

== Records ==
Prior to this competition, the existing world, Asian and Games records were as follows.

World Record	Jade Edmistone (AUS)	30.31	Melbourne, Australia	30 January 2006
Asian Record	Luo Xuejuan (CHN)	30.64	Barcelona, Spain	26 July 2003
Games Record	Luo Xuejuan (CHN)	31.62	Busan, South Korea	1 October 2002

== Results ==
=== Heats ===
Rank	Heat	Athlete	Time	Notes
1	3	Ji Liping (CHN)	31.80	
2	3	Asami Kitagawa (JPN)	32.66	
3	2	Yoshimi Miwa (JPN)	32.78	
4	2	Jung Seul-ki (KOR)	33.28	
5	2	Nicolette Teo (SIN)	33.33	
6	1	Wang Qun (CHN)	33.49	
7	2	Back Su-yeon (KOR)	33.59	
8	1	Suen Ka Yi (HKG)	33.98	
9	1	Roanne Ho (SIN)	34.62	
10	3	Vũ Thùy Dương (VIE)	35.12	
11	3	Yip Tsz Wa (HKG)	35.17	
12	3	Lei On Kei (MAC)	35.49	
13	2	Denjylie Cordero (PHI)	36.02	
14	1	Mayumi Raheem (SRI)	36.14	
15	1	Lei Sin Ian (MAC)	36.64	
16	3	Doli Akhter (BAN)	36.99	
17	1	Sameera Al-Bitar (BRN)	39.91	
18	3	Khürelbaataryn Sainzayaa (MGL)	41.12	
19	2	Hem Thon Vitiny (CAM)	42.60	

=== Final ===
Rank	Athlete	Time	Notes
1st place, gold medalist(s)	Ji Liping (CHN)	31.52	GR
2nd place, silver medalist(s)	Asami Kitagawa (JPN)	32.27	
3rd place, bronze medalist(s)	Wang Qun (CHN)	32.53	
4	Yoshimi Miwa (JPN)	32.61	
5	Jung Seul-ki (KOR)	32.96	
6	Suen Ka Yi (HKG)	33.15	
7	Nicolette Teo (SIN)	33.35	
8	Back Su-yeon (KOR)	33.44	
