= Bahrain at the 2010 Asian Games =

- IOC code: BRN
- NOC: Bahrain Olympic Committee

in Guangzhou
- Competitors: 82 in 9 sports
- Medals Ranked 14th: Gold 5 Silver 0 Bronze 4 Total 9

Asian Games appearances (overview)
- 1974; 1978; 1982; 1986; 1990; 1994; 1998; 2002; 2006; 2010; 2014; 2018; 2022; 2026

Bahrain participated in the 16th Asian Games in Guangzhou, China. Competitors from Bahrain won 5 gold and 4 bronze medals in the Games, all in athletics events.

== Medalists ==
Medal	Name	Sport	Event	Date
Gold	Maryam Yusuf Jamal	Athletics	Women's 1500m	23 November
Gold	Tareq Mubarak Taher	Athletics	Men's 3000m Steeplechase	23 November
Gold	Ali Hasan Mahboob	Athletics	Men's 5000m	23 November
Gold	Mimi Belete	Athletics	Women's 5000m	26 November
Gold	Bilisuma Shugi	Athletics	Men's 10,000m	26 November
Bronze	Belal Mansoor Ali	Athletics	Men's 1500m	23 November
Bronze	Mimi Belete	Athletics	Women's 1500m	23 November
Bronze	Shitaye Eshete	Athletics	Women's 10000m	21 November
Bronze	Ali Hasan Mahboob	Athletics	Men's 10000m	26 November

== Athletics ==
=== Men ===
Track and road events

Event	Athletes	Heats		Semifinal		Final	
Event	Athletes	Time	Rank	Time	Rank	Time	Rank
100 m	Mohamed Ahmed Sanad Alrashedi	10.79 SB	6th	did not advance			
100 m	Mohamed Farhan Khalifa Farhan	DSQ		did not advance			
800 m	Belal Mansoor Belal Ali	1:47.37	3rd QF			1:49.03	7th
800 m	Yusuf Saad Kamel	DNS				did not advance	
1500 m	Belal Mansoor Belal Ali	3:45.55	2nd QF			3:38.39	3rd place, bronze medalist(s)
1500 m	Yusuf Saad Kamel	3:58.80	13th			did not advance	
5,000 m	Mahboob Ali Hasan Mahboob					13:47.86 SB	1st place, gold medalist(s)
5,000 m	Dejenee Regassa Mootumaa					13:50.60 PB	4th
10,000 m	Mahboob Ali Hasan Mahboob					27:40.07 SB	3rd place, bronze medalist(s)
10,000 m	Bilisuma Shugi Gelassa					27:32.72 PB	1st place, gold medalist(s)
3000 m steeplechase	Tareq Mubarak Salem Taher					8:25.89	1st place, gold medalist(s)
Marathon	Khalid Kamal Khalid Yaseen					2:15:52 SB	5th

Field events

Event	Athletes	Semifinal		Final	
Event	Athletes	Result	Rank	Result	Rank
High jump	Salem Naser Bakheet Salem	2.05 m.	16th	did not advance	
Triple jump	Mohamed Yusuf Salman			15.28 m.	12th

=== Women ===
Track and road events

Event	Athletes	Heats		Semifinal		Final	
Event	Athletes	Time	Rank	Time	Rank	Time	Rank
100 m	Faten Abdulnabi Jasim Mahdi	12.83	7th	did not advance			
200 m	Faten Abdulnabi Jasim Mahdi	DSQ				did not advance	
800 m	Maryam Yusuf Isa Jamal	2:04.54	2nd QF			2:06.07	6th
800 m	Genzeb Shumi Regasa	2:04.09 PB	7th QF			2:08.38	8th
1500 m	Mimi Belete Gebregeiorges					4:10.42	3rd place, bronze medalist(s)
1500 m	Maryam Yusuf Isa Jamal					4:08.22	1st place, gold medalist(s)
5000 m	Mimi Belete Gebregeiorges					15:15.59 PB	1st place, gold medalist(s)
5000 m	Kareema Saleh Jasim					15:20.01	4th
10000 m	Tejitu Daba Chalchissa					32:21.29 PB	7th
10000 m	Shitaya Eshete Habtegebrel					31:53.27	3rd place, bronze medalist(s)
100 m Hurdles	Fatmata Fofanah	DNS				did not advance	
3000 m steeplechase	Aster Tesfaye Tilahun					11:00.64 PB	6th
3000 m steeplechase	Kareema Saleh Jasim					10:05.60 PB	4th
Marathon	Lishan Dula Gemgchu					2:33:56	6th

== Cycling ==
=== Road cycling ===
==== Men ====
Athlete	Event	Time	Rank
Sayed Ahmed Khalil Alawi	Road race	4:14:56.24	10th
Mansoor Mohamed Jawad	Road race	4:14:57.60	14th

== Football ==
=== Men ===
- Mohamed Ajaj
- Mohamed Al Banna
- Mahmood Alajmi
- Abdulla Alhazaa
- Rashed Alhooti
- Abdulwahab Almalood
- Saad Alromaihi
- Abdulwahab Alsafi
- Mahmood Ayyad
- Mohamed Harban
- Sayed Hashem
- Ebrahim Shawqi Isa
- Ismaeel Khamis
- Ebrahim Lutfalla
- Mohamed Mahorfi
- Ahmed Mushaima
- Hesham Nayem
- Mohamed Jaadar Sahman
- Tareq Showaitezr
- Sayed Dhiya Shubbar

Men's team will participate in Group B of the football tournament.

Group B

Pos	Team	Pld	W	D	L	GF	GA	GD	Pts
1	Iran	3	3	0	0	6	1	+5	9
2	Turkmenistan	3	1	1	1	8	7	+1	4
3	Vietnam	3	1	0	2	5	8	−3	3
4	Bahrain	3	0	1	2	2	5	−3	1

Source: RSSSF
November 8
16:00

Vietnam	3 – 1	Bahrain
Dinh Thanh Trung 34'; Nguyen Trong Hoang 72'; Nguyen Anh Duc 89'	Report	Isa 90+3' (pen.)

Guangdong People's Stadium, Guangzhou
Referee: Tayeb Shamsuzzaman (Bangladesh)

November 10
19:00

Iran	1 – 0	Bahrain
Ansarifard 45+1'	Report

University City Stadium, Guangzhou
Referee: Ben Williams (Australia)

November 13
19:00

Bahrain	1 – 1	Turkmenistan
Showaiter 49'	Report	Mingazov 48'

Guangdong People's Stadium, Guangzhou
Referee: Zhao Liang (China)

2010 Asian Games 18th

Bahrain

== Handball ==
=== Men ===
- Salah Abduljalil Jasim Abbas
- Hasan Shehab Ahmed Alfardan
- Ali Merza Salman Abdulla Ali
- Mohamed Husain Abdulla Ali
- Ali Zuhair Isa Abdulla Ali
- Sadiq Ali Abdulla Mohamed Ali
- Husain Ali Hassan Ebrahim Alsayyad
- Mahmood Mansoor Ahmed Alwanna
- Ali Husain Abdulredha Husain
- Ahmed Abbas Abdulla Yusuf Jasim
- Saeed Jasim Mohamed Jawher
- Hasan Mohamed Ali Hasan Madan
- Abbas Habib Mohamed Ali Malalla
- Jaafar Abbas Abdulkarim Mohamed
- Jaafer Abdulqader Ali Daw Salman
- Maher AshoorIsa Yahya Yahya

Men's team will participate in Group B of the handball tournament.

Group B

Pos	Team	Pld	W	D	L	GF	GA	GD	Pts	Qualification
1	South Korea	4	4	0	0	149	98	+51	8	Semifinals
2	Iran	4	3	0	1	127	95	+32	6	Semifinals
3	Bahrain	4	2	0	2	118	111	+7	4	Placement 5th–6th
4	Athletes from Kuwait	4	1	0	3	126	111	+15	2	Placement 7th–8th
5	Hong Kong	4	0	0	4	67	172	−105	0	Placement 9th–10th

Source: Results

November 13; 14:00	Kuwait	25 – 27	Bahrain	Guanggong Gymnasium, Guangzhou; Referees: Ossipov, Porol (KAZ)
November 13; 14:00	M. Al-Gharaballi 8	(14–13)	Al-Wanna 7	Guanggong Gymnasium, Guangzhou; Referees: Ossipov, Porol (KAZ)
November 13; 14:00	3× (yellow card) 5× (suspension)	Report	1× (yellow card) 6× (suspension) 2× (red card)	Guanggong Gymnasium, Guangzhou; Referees: Ossipov, Porol (KAZ)

November 14; 15:45	South Korea	35 – 27	Bahrain	Guanggong Gymnasium, Guangzhou; Referees: Hizaki, Ikebuchi (JPN)
November 14; 15:45	Park J.G. 8	(19–11)	Abdulqader 9	Guanggong Gymnasium, Guangzhou; Referees: Hizaki, Ikebuchi (JPN)
November 14; 15:45	3× (yellow card) 2× (suspension)	Report	3× (yellow card) 2× (suspension) 1× (red card)	Guanggong Gymnasium, Guangzhou; Referees: Hizaki, Ikebuchi (JPN)

November 16; 15:45	Iran	31 – 24	Bahrain	Guanggong Gymnasium, Guangzhou; Referees: Li, Wang (CHN)
November 16; 15:45	A. Esteki 11	(15–10)	Jawhar 8	Guanggong Gymnasium, Guangzhou; Referees: Li, Wang (CHN)
November 16; 15:45	3× (yellow card) 2× (suspension)	Report	4× (yellow card) 6× (suspension) 1× (red card)	Guanggong Gymnasium, Guangzhou; Referees: Li, Wang (CHN)

November 19; 14:00	Bahrain	40 – 20	Hong Kong	Guanggong Gymnasium, Guangzhou; Referees: Hizaki, Ikebuchi (JPN)
November 19; 14:00	Al-Wanna 8	(18–9)	Hui M.P. 5	Guanggong Gymnasium, Guangzhou; Referees: Hizaki, Ikebuchi (JPN)
November 19; 14:00	2× (yellow card) 1× (suspension)	Report	2× (yellow card) 2× (suspension)	Guanggong Gymnasium, Guangzhou; Referees: Hizaki, Ikebuchi (JPN)

Placement 5th–6th

November 24; 20:15	Qatar	28 – 26	Bahrain	Huashi Gymnasium, Guangzhou; Referees: Hizaki, Ikebuchi (JPN)
November 24; 20:15	Al-Ghamdi 7	(10–14)	Abbas 6	Huashi Gymnasium, Guangzhou; Referees: Hizaki, Ikebuchi (JPN)
November 24; 20:15	4× (yellow card) 7× (suspension)	Report	3× (yellow card) 2× (suspension)	Huashi Gymnasium, Guangzhou; Referees: Hizaki, Ikebuchi (JPN)

2010 Asian Games 6th

Bahrain

== Judo ==
=== Men ===
Athlete	Event	1st Round	Round of 32	Round of 16	Quarterfinals	Semifinals	Final
Athlete	Event	Opposition Result	Opposition Result	Opposition Result	Opposition Result	Opposition Result	Opposition Result
Khaled Nabeel Hussain Alaraifi	Men's −100 kg	Hao Dang (VIE); W 101 - 000	Ramziddin Sayidov (UZB); L 000 S1 - 100	did not advance			
Khaled Nabeel Hussain Alaraifi	Men's Open category	Kazuhiko Takahashi (JPN); L 000 S4 - 100	did not advance				

== Sailing ==
=== Men ===
Athlete	Event	Race												Net Points	Final Rank
Athlete	Event	1	2	3	4	5	6	7	8	9	10	11	12	Net Points	Final Rank
Sami Abdulwahab Mohamed Alkooheji	Single-handed Dinghy (Laser)	(6)	5	4	5	6	5	5	3	3	6	5	4	51.0	5th

=== Open ===
Athlete	Event	Opposition	Opposition	Opposition	Opposition	Opposition	Opposition	Opposition	Total Points	Final Rank
Athlete	Event	1st + 2nd Race Points	1st + 2nd Race Points	1st + 2nd Race Points	1st + 2nd Race Points	1st + 2nd Race Points	1st + 2nd Race Points	1st + 2nd Race Points	Total Points	Final Rank
Ebrahim Khamis Khamis Ebr Hazeem; Kacem Ben Jemia; Ebrahim Abdulla Salman Sadeq; Abdulrahim Abdulla Salman Sadiq; Muhanna Salman Muhanna Aldoseri	Open Match Racing	China (CHN); 0-2	Pakistan (PAK); 1-1	Malaysia (MAS); 1-1	South Korea (KOR); 1-1	Singapore (SIN); 0-2	Japan (JPN); 1-1	India (IND); 0-2	4	5th

== Shooting ==
=== Men ===
Event	Athlete	Qualification		Final	
Event	Athlete	Score	Rank	Score	Rank
Men's 10 m air pistol	Khalid Ahmed Mohammed Omar	551- 8x	46th	did not advance	
Men's 10 m air pistol	Ashban Mohamed Eid Sulaiman	566-12x	31st	did not advance	
Men's 10 m air rifle	Ali Husain Ali Mohame Alhaiderabadi	582-37x	28th	did not advance	
Men's 25 m center fire pistol	Khalid Ahmed Mohammed Omar			567- 9x	31st
Men's 25 m center fire pistol	Ashban Mohamed Eid Sulaiman			545-10x	36th
Men's 25 m rapid fire pistol	Ashban Mohamed Eid Sulaiman	DNS		did not advance	
Men's 25 m standard pistol	Khalid Ahmed Mohammed Omar			542- 3x	33rd
Men's 25 m standard pistol	Ashban Mohamed Eid Sulaiman			548- 5x	26th
Men's 50 m pistol	Khalid Ahmed Mohammed Omar	525- 5x	40th	did not advance	
Men's 50 m pistol	Ashban Mohamed Eid Sulaiman	527- 5x	39th	did not advance	
Men's 50 m rifle prone	Jamal Ali Mohamed Naji Al Sebbah	591-34x	11th	did not advance	

=== Women ===
Event	Athlete	Qualification		Final	
Event	Athlete	Score	Rank	Score	Rank
Women's 10 m air rifle	Sabika Mubarak Juma Mubarak	390-27x	27th	did not advance	
Women's 50 m rifle three positions	Azza Ali Abdulla Ali Alqasmi	547-13x	42nd	did not advance	
Women's 50 m rifle prone	Azza Ali Abdulla Ali Alqasmi			579-21x	37th

== Swimming ==
=== Men ===
Athlete(s)	Event	Heats		Final	
Athlete(s)	Event	Result	Rank	Result	Rank
50 m Freestyle	Omar Yusuf Mohamed Jasim	25.11	32nd	did not advance	
100 m Freestyle	Omar Yusuf Mohamed Jasim	DNS		did not advance	
50 m Breaststroke	Omar Yusuf Mohamed Jasim	31.48	27th	did not advance	

=== Women ===
Athlete(s)	Event	Heats		Final	
Athlete(s)	Event	Result	Rank	Result	Rank
50 m Freestyle	Sara Abdulrahman Ali Alflaij	32.73	22nd	did not advance	
50 m Breaststroke	Sara Abdulrahman Ali Alflaij	44.66	20th	did not advance	

== Taekwondo ==
=== Men ===
Athlete	Event	Round of 32	Round of 16	Quarterfinals	Semifinals	Final
Athlete	Event	Opposition Result	Opposition Result	Opposition Result	Opposition Result	Opposition Result
Abdulrahim A.hameed Ahmed	Finweight (-54kg)	BYE	Kumar Sunil (IND); W PTS 8-2	Seong Ho Kim (KOR); L WDR Round 2 1:45	did not advance	
Ebrahim Abdulhameed Ahmed	Flyweight (-58kg)	BYE	Bilguun Khosbayar (MGL); L PTS 3-5	did not advance		
Mahmood Adel Hameed Jaafar	Bantamweight (-63kg)	BYE	Yuan Chih Chu (TPE); L PTS 4-7	did not advance		
Hamad Wadeea Hasan Ahmed Khalil	Welterweight (-80kg)	Marlon Avenido (PHI); L PTS 3-7	did not advance			
Hamad Wadeea Hasan Ahmed Khalil	Middleweight (-87kg)		BYE	Yousef Karami (IRI); L PTS 2-7	did not advance	

=== Women ===
Athlete	Event	Round of 32	Round of 16	Quarterfinals	Semifinals	Final
Athlete	Event	Opposition Result	Opposition Result	Opposition Result	Opposition Result	Opposition Result
Deena Abdulla Mahboob Mahboob	Finweight (-46kg)	BYE	Dana Touran (JOR); L PTS 0-18	did not advance		
Kaltham Jasim Mohamed Jawher	Bantamweight (-53kg)	BYE	Thi Hoai Thu Hguyen (VIE); L DSQ	did not advance		
