= Swimming at the 2010 Asian Games – Women's 200 metre breaststroke =

Women's 200 metre breaststroke at the 2010 Asian Games
- Venue: Aoti Aquatics Centre
- Date: 17 November 2010
- Competitors: 16 from 10 nations

Medalists
gold medal	Jeong Da-rae	South Korea
silver medal	Sun Ye	China
bronze medal	Ji Liping	China

The women's 200 metre breaststroke event at the 2010 Asian Games took place on 17 November 2010 at Guangzhou Aoti Aquatics Centre.

There were 16 competitors from 10 different countries who took part in this event. Two heats were held, the heat in which a swimmer competed did not formally matter for advancement, as the swimmers with the top eight times from the entire field qualified for the finals.

Jeong Da-rae from South Korea won the gold medal, it was the first gold medal for Korean female swimmers since 1998 Asian Games. Sun Ye and Ji Liping of People's Republic of China won the silver and bronze medal respectively.

== Schedule ==
All times are China Standard Time (UTC+08:00)

Date	Time	Event
Wednesday, 17 November 2010	09:36	Heats
Wednesday, 17 November 2010	18:23	Final

== Records ==
Prior to this competition, the existing world, Asian and Games records were as follows.

World Record	Annamay Pierse (CAN)	2:20.12	Rome, Italy	30 July 2009
Asian Record	Rie Kaneto (JPN)	2:20.72	Kumamoto, Japan	6 September 2009
Games Record	Qi Hui (CHN)	2:23.93	Doha, Qatar	6 December 2006

== Results ==
=== Heats ===
Rank	Heat	Athlete	Time	Notes
1	2	Jeong Da-rae (KOR)	2:27.07	
2	2	Rie Kaneto (JPN)	2:28.36	
3	1	Back Su-yeon (KOR)	2:30.43	
4	1	Satomi Suzuki (JPN)	2:30.45	
5	1	Sun Ye (CHN)	2:30.95	
6	2	Ji Liping (CHN)	2:31.91	
7	2	Yvette Kong (HKG)	2:36.75	
8	2	Chavunnooch Salubluek (THA)	2:37.56	
9	2	Samantha Yeo (SIN)	2:37.74	
10	2	Chen I-chuan (TPE)	2:38.11	
11	1	Fiona Ma (HKG)	2:39.08	
12	2	Phiangkhwan Pawapotako (THA)	2:39.29	
13	1	Christina Loh (MAS)	2:40.54	
14	1	Erika Kong (MAS)	2:40.76	
15	1	Phạm Thị Huệ (VIE)	2:41.34	
16	1	Lei On Kei (MAC)	2:44.72	

=== Final ===
Rank	Athlete	Time	Notes
1st place, gold medalist(s)	Jeong Da-rae (KOR)	2:25.02	
2nd place, silver medalist(s)	Sun Ye (CHN)	2:25.27	
3rd place, bronze medalist(s)	Ji Liping (CHN)	2:25.40	
4	Rie Kaneto (JPN)	2:25.63	
5	Satomi Suzuki (JPN)	2:25.68	
6	Back Su-yeon (KOR)	2:28.27	
7	Yvette Kong (HKG)	2:35.73	
8	Chavunnooch Salubluek (THA)	2:37.86	
