= 2012 FINA World Swimming Championships (25 m) – Men's 100 metre freestyle =

Men's 100m Freestyle at the 2012 Short Course Worlds
- Venue: Sinan Erdem Dome
- Location: Istanbul, Turkey
- Dates: 15 December (heats and semifinals); 16 December (final)
- Winning time: 45.65

Medalists
| gold medal | Vladimir Morozov | Russia |
| silver medal | Tommaso D'Orsogna | Australia |
| bronze medal | Yevgeny Lagunov | Russia |

The men's 100 metre freestyle event at the 11th FINA World Swimming Championships (25m) took place 15 – 16 December 2012 at the Sinan Erdem Dome in Istanbul, Turkey.

== Records ==
Prior to this competition, the existing world and championship records were as follows.

| | Name | Nation | Time | Location | Date |
|---|---|---|---|---|---|
| World record | Amaury Leveaux | France | 44.94 | Rijeka | 13 December 2008 |
| Championship record | Vladimir Morozov | Russia | 45.52 | Istanbul | 12 December 2012 |

No new records were set during this competition.

== Results ==
=== Heats ===
| Rank | Heat | Lane | Name | Time | Notes |
|---|---|---|---|---|---|
| 1 | 15 | 4 | Evgeny Lagunov (RUS) | 47.34 | Q |
| 2 | 14 | 4 | Luca Dotto (ITA) | 47.43 | Q |
| 3 | 15 | 5 | Matt Grevers (USA) | 47.51 | Q |
| 4 | 16 | 4 | Vladimir Morozov (RUS) | 47.58 | Q |
| 5 | 14 | 6 | Jimmy Feigen (USA) | 47.63 | Q |
| 6 | 16 | 5 | Tommaso D'Orsogna (AUS) | 47.64 | Q |
| 6 | 16 | 3 | Kyle Richardson (AUS) | 47.64 | Q |
| 8 | 2 | 8 | Filippo Magnini (ITA) | 47.76 | Q |
| 9 | 16 | 6 | Kemal Arda Gurdal (TUR) | 47.79 | Q |
| 10 | 15 | 7 | Lü Zhiwu (CHN) | 47.80 | Q |
| 11 | 2 | 9 | Mindaugas Sadauskas (LTU) | 47.82 | Q |
| 12 | 15 | 3 | Hanser García (CUB) | 47.84 | Q |
| 13 | 14 | 5 | Konrad Czerniak (POL) | 47.95 | Q |
| 14 | 16 | 1 | Guilherme Roth (BRA) | 48.04 | Q |
| 15 | 13 | 1 | Ben Hockin (PAR) | 48.08 | Q, NR |
| 15 | 16 | 9 | Kenji Kobase (JPN) | 48.08 | Q |
| 17 | 14 | 7 | Dominik Kozma (HUN) | 48.15 | |
| 18 | 14 | 1 | Yannick Lebherz (GER) | 48.19 | |
| 19 | 15 | 2 | Kenta Ito (JPN) | 48.21 | |
| 20 | 16 | 0 | Leith Shankland (RSA) | 48.25 | |
| 21 | 13 | 4 | Norbert Trandafir (ROU) | 48.26 | NR |
| 22 | 14 | 3 | Krisztián Takács (HUN) | 48.28 | |
| 22 | 16 | 7 | Christoph Fildebrandt (GER) | 48.28 | |
| 24 | 15 | 1 | Martin Verner (CZE) | 48.44 | |
| 25 | 14 | 2 | Fernando Santos (BRA) | 48.56 | |
| 26 | 14 | 9 | Doğa Çelik (TUR) | 48.70 | |
| 27 | 15 | 0 | Pjotr Degtjarov (EST) | 48.74 | |
| 28 | 15 | 8 | Jason Dunford (KEN) | 48.81 | |
| 29 | 13 | 3 | Matias Aguilera (ARG) | 48.87 | |
| 29 | 13 | 7 | Cameron Simpson (NZL) | 48.87 | |
| 31 | 14 | 0 | Tomas Plevko (CZE) | 48.88 | |
| 32 | 12 | 7 | Shi Tengfei (CHN) | 48.97 | |
| 33 | 16 | 8 | Amaury Leveaux (FRA) | 48.98 | |
| 34 | 12 | 0 | Luke Peddie (CAN) | 49.04 | |
| 35 | 12 | 6 | Guy Barnea (ISR) | 49.06 | |
| 36 | 12 | 5 | Ieuan Lloyd (GBR) | 49.09 | |
| 36 | 14 | 8 | Joaquin Belza (ARG) | 49.09 | |
| 38 | 13 | 2 | Arseni Kukharau (BLR) | 49.11 | |
| 39 | 12 | 3 | Kristian Golomeev (GRE) | 49.15 | |
| 40 | 12 | 8 | Anders Lie Nielsen (DEN) | 49.16 | |
| 41 | 15 | 9 | Lorys Bourelly (FRA) | 49.18 | |
| 42 | 13 | 6 | Joshua McLeod (TRI) | 49.22 | |
| 43 | 12 | 9 | Daniel Ramirez Carranza (MEX) | 49.26 | NR |
| 44 | 2 | 3 | Arnel Dudic (BIH) | 49.39 | NR |
| 45 | 13 | 8 | Charles Hockin Brusquetti (PAR) | 49.56 | |
| 46 | 12 | 4 | Hoang Quy Phuoc (VIE) | 49.60 | |
| 47 | 15 | 6 | Ari-Pekka Liukkonen (FIN) | 49.62 | |
| 48 | 11 | 4 | Andrew Chetcuti (MLT) | 49.92 | NR |
| 49 | 9 | 7 | Emmanuel Crescimbeni (PER) | 49.98 | NR |
| 50 | 13 | 0 | Alexandre Liess (SUI) | 49.98 | |
| 51 | 11 | 3 | Orri Freyr Gudmundsson (ISL) | 49.99 | |
| 52 | 11 | 5 | Gabriel Melconian (URU) | 50.01 | |
| 53 | 11 | 7 | Khurshidjon Tursunov (UZB) | 50.04 | |
| 54 | 13 | 9 | Matthew Stanley (NZL) | 50.05 | |
| 55 | 11 | 1 | Kevin Ávila (GUA) | 50.11 | |
| 56 | 11 | 6 | Danas Rapsys (LTU) | 50.12 | |
| 57 | 11 | 2 | Enzo Martinez Scarpe (URU) | 50.15 | |
| 58 | 11 | 0 | Mihael Vukic (CRO) | 50.30 | |
| 59 | 12 | 2 | Alon Mandel (ISR) | 50.46 | |
| 60 | 12 | 1 | Matthew Abeysinghe (SRI) | 50.74 | |
| 61 | 9 | 9 | Irakli Revishvili (GEO) | 50.79 | |
| 62 | 8 | 4 | Omiros Zagkas (CYP) | 50.83 | |
| 63 | 2 | 1 | Mohammed Madouh (KUW) | 50.86 | |
| 63 | 10 | 4 | Jemal Le Grand (ARU) | 50.86 | |
| 65 | 10 | 0 | Jusuf Nikola Ustavdich Velez (PER) | 51.04 | |
| 66 | 10 | 8 | David Sikharulidze (GEO) | 51.09 | |
| 67 | 9 | 4 | José Montoya (CRC) | 51.14 | |
| 68 | 9 | 0 | Sean Gunn (ZIM) | 51.15 | |
| 69 | 11 | 8 | Abdoul Khadre Mbaye Niane (SEN) | 51.23 | |
| 70 | 10 | 9 | Chun Nam Derrick Ng (HKG) | 51.33 | |
| 71 | 10 | 5 | Kai Wee Rainer Ng (SIN) | 51.41 | |
| 72 | 10 | 1 | Radhames Kalaf (DOM) | 51.42 | |
| 73 | 2 | 0 | Andrew Rutherfurd (BOL) | 51.45 | NR |
| 74 | 2 | 7 | Jessie Khing Lacuna (PHI) | 51.57 | |
| 75 | 10 | 6 | Ayman Klzie (SYR) | 51.59 | |
| 76 | 9 | 1 | Lao Kuan Fong (MAC) | 51.67 | |
| 77 | 8 | 9 | JP Engelbrecht (NAM) | 51.70 | NR |
| 78 | 8 | 0 | Jordan Augier (LCA) | 51.90 | NR |
| 79 | 10 | 3 | Stanislav Karnaukhov (KGZ) | 51.99 | |
| 80 | 11 | 9 | Christopher Duenas (GUM) | 52.00 | |
| 81 | 10 | 7 | Esau Simpson (GRN) | 52.08 | |
| 82 | 7 | 9 | Samson Opuakpo (NGR) | 52.18 | |
| 83 | 7 | 4 | Ngou Pok Man (MAC) | 52.20 | |
| 84 | 10 | 2 | Aleksander Slepchenko (KGZ) | 52.29 | |
| 85 | 9 | 3 | Vahan Mkhitaryan (ARM) | 52.48 | |
| 86 | 8 | 3 | Christian Selby (BAR) | 52.58 | |
| 87 | 5 | 3 | Bradford Worrell (LCA) | 52.83 | |
| 88 | 8 | 7 | Wellim Maksi (SYR) | 53.06 | |
| 89 | 1 | 3 | Adrian Todd (BOT) | 53.08 | |
| 89 | 8 | 1 | Quinton Delie (NAM) | 53.08 | |
| 91 | 8 | 2 | Ahmad Attellesey (LBA) | 53.13 | |
| 92 | 6 | 5 | Sergey Krovyakov (TKM) | 53.26 | |
| 93 | 6 | 8 | Stanford Gore Kawale (PNG) | 53.47 | |
| 94 | 7 | 8 | Mathieu Marquet (MRI) | 53.54 | |
| 95 | 7 | 5 | Nicholas Coard (GRN) | 53.67 | |
| 96 | 7 | 2 | Edward Caruana Dingli (MLT) | 53.70 | |
| 97 | 8 | 8 | Omar Yousif (BHR) | 53.72 | |
| 98 | 9 | 8 | Neil Himanshu Contractor (IND) | 53.92 | |
| 99 | 7 | 6 | James Sanderson (GIB) | 53.93 | |
| 100 | 7 | 7 | Paul Elaisa (FIJ) | 54.01 | |
| 101 | 6 | 1 | Fernando Medrano Medina (NCA) | 54.11 | |
| 102 | 7 | 3 | Ahmed Salam Al-Dulaimi (IRQ) | 54.19 | |
| 103 | 6 | 4 | Christian Nazario Nikles (BRU) | 54.21 | |
| 104 | 9 | 2 | Mohamed Al-Ghafri (UAE) | 54.54 | |
| 105 | 8 | 5 | Johnny Rivera (GUM) | 54.57 | |
| 106 | 5 | 7 | Adam Viktora (SEY) | 54.61 | |
| 107 | 8 | 6 | Jaywant Arcot Vijaykumar (IND) | 54.71 | |
| 108 | 6 | 6 | Khader Baqleh (JOR) | 54.77 | |
| 109 | 6 | 2 | Zaur Arkaniya (AZE) | 54.98 | |
| 110 | 1 | 6 | David van der Colff (BOT) | 55.62 | |
| 111 | 5 | 9 | Roman Hramtsov (TKM) | 55.77 | |
| 111 | 6 | 9 | Dulguun Batsaikhan (MGL) | 55.77 | |
| 113 | 5 | 6 | Farhan Farhan (BHR) | 55.79 | |
| 114 | 6 | 0 | Tepaia Zac Payne (COK) | 55.93 | |
| 115 | 6 | 3 | Valdo Lourenço (MOZ) | 55.94 | |
| 116 | 7 | 0 | Tory Michael Pragassa (KEN) | 56.02 | |
| 117 | 5 | 5 | C. Andrews (COK) | 56.12 | |
| 118 | 2 | 2 | Hilal Hemed Hilal (TAN) | 56.46 | |
| 119 | 1 | 4 | Mamadou Soumare (MLI) | 56.51 | |
| 120 | 5 | 2 | Abdulrahman Al-Kuwari (QAT) | 57.21 | |
| 120 | 6 | 7 | Oliver Quick (GIB) | 57.21 | |
| 122 | 1 | 5 | Aung Thiha (MYA) | 57.27 | |
| 123 | 4 | 4 | Giordan Harris (MHL) | 57.72 | |
| 124 | 5 | 1 | Israr Hussain (PAK) | 58.05 | |
| 125 | 2 | 5 | Borhane Ahmed Mohamed Abro (DJI) | 58.28 | |
| 126 | 2 | 6 | Ammaar Ghadiyali (TAN) | 58.96 | |
| 127 | 4 | 5 | Hannibal Gaskin (GUY) | 59.11 | |
| 128 | 4 | 6 | Franc Aleksi (ALB) | 59.31 | |
| 129 | 5 | 8 | Noah Al-Khulaifi (QAT) | 59.35 | |
| 130 | 3 | 4 | Brandon Schuster (SAM) | 59.94 | |
| 131 | 5 | 0 | Tano Pierre Claver Atta (CIV) | 1:00.03 | |
| 132 | 4 | 0 | Miraj Prajapati (NEP) | 1:00.54 | |
| 133 | 4 | 8 | Shawn Dingilius-Wallace (PLW) | 1:00.83 | |
| 134 | 3 | 6 | Amadou Camara (GUI) | 1:03.16 | |
| 135 | 4 | 1 | Jamal Tamasese (SAM) | 1:03.30 | |
| 136 | 3 | 3 | Shamshod Dzhumaev (TJK) | 1:04.78 | |
| 137 | 3 | 8 | Carmel Bavuna (BDI) | 1:05.71 | |
| 138 | 4 | 9 | Billy-Scott Irakoze (BDI) | 1:06.98 | |
| 139 | 3 | 1 | Godonou Wilfrid Tevoedjre (BEN) | 1:07.23 | |
| 140 | 3 | 0 | Nikolas Sylvester (VIN) | 1:07.27 | |
| 141 | 1 | 2 | Kamara Osman (SLE) | 1:07.84 | |
| 142 | 3 | 2 | Mukhammad Khakimov (TJK) | 1:08.44 | |
| 143 | 1 | 7 | Moris Beale (SLE) | 1:08.56 | |
| 144 | 4 | 9 | Ben Moussa Abdulkadry Djinguy (CMR) | 1:08.73 | |
| 145 | 2 | 4 | Chavez Joseph (VIN) | 1:10.88 | |
| 146 | 1 | 9 | Mohamed Salim Mgman Sani (NIG) | 1:15.86 | |
| 147 | 1 | 1 | James Sahr (SLE) | 1:16.99 | |
| | 4 | 7 | Sirish Gurung (NEP) | DSQ | |
| | 16 | 2 | Thomas Gossland (CAN) | DSQ | |
| | 1 | 0 | Youssouf Ahmadou Abdoul-Razok (NIG) | DNS | |
| | 1 | 8 | Gibrilla Bamba (SLE) | DNS | |
| | 3 | 5 | Ralph Benjamin Teiko Quaye (GHA) | DNS | |
| | 3 | 7 | Christopher Bennet Symonds (GHA) | DNS | |
| | 4 | 2 | Aonzoudine Chaoili (COM) | DNS | |
| | 4 | 3 | Athoumani Youssouf (COM) | DNS | |
| | 5 | 4 | Mbeh Tanji (CMR) | DNS | |
| | 7 | 1 | João Aguiar (ANG) | DNS | |
| | 9 | 5 | Ahmed Mathlouthi (TUN) | DNS | |
| | 9 | 6 | Pedro Pinotes (ANG) | DNS | |
| | 13 | 5 | Oussama Sahnoune (ALG) | DNS | |

=== Semifinals ===
| Rank | Heat | Lane | Name | Nationality | Time | Notes |
|---|---|---|---|---|---|---|
| 1 | 1 | 5 | Vladimir Morozov | Russia | 45.79 | Q |
| 2 | 1 | 4 | Luca Dotto | Italy | 46.83 | Q |
| 3 | 1 | 3 | Tommaso D'Orsogna | Australia | 46.89 | Q |
| 4 | 2 | 5 | Matt Grevers | United States | 47.14 | Q |
| 5 | 2 | 3 | Jimmy Feigen | United States | 47.26 | Q |
| 6 | 1 | 7 | Hanser García | Cuba | 47.28 | Q, NR |
| 7 | 1 | 2 | Lü Zhiwu | China | 47.29 | Q |
| 8 | 2 | 4 | Evgeny Lagunov | Russia | 47.35 | Q |
| 9 | 2 | 6 | Kyle Richardson | Australia | 47.39 | |
| 10 | 2 | 1 | Konrad Czerniak | Poland | 47.41 | |
| 11 | 2 | 2 | Kemal Arda Gurdal | Turkey | 47.58 | |
| 12 | 1 | 6 | Filippo Magnini | Italy | 47.61 | |
| 13 | 2 | 8 | Ben Hockin | Paraguay | 47.95 | NR |
| 14 | 1 | 8 | Kenji Kobase | Japan | 48.02 | |
| 15 | 1 | 1 | Guilherme Roth | Brazil | 48.03 | |
| 16 | 2 | 7 | Mindaugas Sadauskas | Lithuania | 48.50 | |

=== Final ===
The final was held at 19:00.

| Rank | Lane | Name | Nationality | Time | Notes |
|---|---|---|---|---|---|
| 1st place, gold medalist(s) | 4 | Vladimir Morozov | Russia | 45.65 | |
| 2nd place, silver medalist(s) | 3 | Tommaso D'Orsogna | Australia | 46.80 | |
| 3rd place, bronze medalist(s) | 8 | Yevgeny Lagunov | Russia | 46.81 | |
| 4 | 5 | Luca Dotto | Italy | 46.84 | |
| 5 | 6 | Matt Grevers | United States | 47.05 | |
| 6 | 2 | Jimmy Feigen | United States | 47.11 | |
| 7 | 7 | Hanser García | Cuba | 47.19 | NR |
| 8 | 1 | Lü Zhiwu | China | 47.35 | |
