= Swimming at the 2006 Asian Games – Women's 100 metre breaststroke =

Women's 100 metre breaststroke at the 2006 Asian Games
- Venue: Hamad Aquatic Centre
- Date: 5 December 2006
- Competitors: 17 from 12 nations

Medalists
gold medal	Asami Kitagawa	Japan
silver medal	Ji Liping	China
bronze medal	Back Su-yeon	South Korea

The women's 100m breaststroke swimming event at the 2006 Asian Games was held on December 5, 2006 at the Hamad Aquatic Centre in Doha, Qatar.

== Schedule ==
All times are Arabia Standard Time (UTC+03:00)

Date	Time	Event
Tuesday, 5 December 2006	10:12	Heats
Tuesday, 5 December 2006	18:05	Final

== Records ==
Prior to this competition, the existing world, Asian and Games records were as follows.

World Record	Leisel Jones (AUS)	1:05.09	Melbourne, Australia	20 March 2006
Asian Record	Luo Xuejuan (CHN)	1:06.64	Athens, Greece	16 August 2004
Games Record	Luo Xuejuan (CHN)	1:06.84	Busan, South Korea	1 October 2002

== Results ==
=== Heats ===
Rank	Heat	Athlete	Time	Notes
1	2	Asami Kitagawa (JPN)	1:09.86	
2	1	Ji Liping (CHN)	1:10.36	
3	1	Back Su-yeon (KOR)	1:10.91	
4	3	Jung Seul-ki (KOR)	1:11.04	
5	2	Nicolette Teo (SIN)	1:11.65	
6	3	Siow Yi Ting (MAS)	1:11.72	
7	3	Yoshimi Miwa (JPN)	1:11.81	
8	2	Wang Qun (CHN)	1:12.40	
9	3	Suen Ka Yi (HKG)	1:15.69	
10	2	Yip Tsz Wa (HKG)	1:16.86	
11	1	Vũ Thùy Dương (VIE)	1:16.97	
12	1	Mayumi Raheem (SRI)	1:17.26	
13	1	Denjylie Cordero (PHI)	1:17.33	
14	3	Lei On Kei (MAC)	1:18.40	
15	2	Lei Sin Ian (MAC)	1:19.36	
16	3	Doli Akhter (BAN)	1:21.69	
17	2	Sameera Al-Bitar (BRN)	1:27.24	

=== Final ===
Rank	Athlete	Time	Notes
1st place, gold medalist(s)	Asami Kitagawa (JPN)	1:09.13	
2nd place, silver medalist(s)	Ji Liping (CHN)	1:09.47	
3rd place, bronze medalist(s)	Back Su-yeon (KOR)	1:10.22	
4	Jung Seul-ki (KOR)	1:10.53	
5	Nicolette Teo (SIN)	1:11.16	
6	Siow Yi Ting (MAS)	1:11.29	
7	Yoshimi Miwa (JPN)	1:12.08	
8	Wang Qun (CHN)	1:14.25	
