= 2010 FINA World Swimming Championships (25 m) – Men's 100 metre individual medley =

Men's 100 metre individual medley at the 2010 FINA World Swimming Championships (25 m)
- Dates: 18 December 2010 (heats and final); 19 December 2010 (final)
- Competitors: 83
- Winning time: 50.86

Medalists
gold medal	Ryan Lochte	United States
silver medal	Markus Deibler	Germany
bronze medal	Sergey Fesikov	Russia

The Men's 100 Individual Medley (or "I.M.") at the 10th FINA World Swimming Championships (25m) was swum 18–19 December 2010 in Dubai, United Arab Emirates. On 18 December, 83 individuals swam in the Preliminary heats in the morning, with the top-16 finishers advancing to the Semifinals that evening. The top-8 finishers from Semifinals then advanced to the Final the next evening.

At the start of the event, the existing World (WR) and Championship records (CR) were:

	Name	Nation	Time	Location	Date
WR	Peter Mankoč	Slovenia	50.76	Istanbul	12 December 2009
CR	Ryan Lochte	United States	51.15	Manchester	13 April 2008

The following records were established during the competition:

Date	Round	Name	Nation	Time	WR	CR
18 December 2010	Semifinals	Ryan Lochte	United States	50.81		CR

== Results ==
=== Heats ===
Rank	Heat	Lane	Name	Time	Notes
1	2	3	Ryan Lochte (USA)	52.06	Q
2	11	3	Henrique Rodrigues (BRA)	52.53	Q
3	11	7	George Bovell (TRI)	52.60	Q
4	11	5	Kenneth To (AUS)	52.75	Q
5	11	4	Peter Mankoc (SLO)	52.78	Q
6	9	4	Markus Deibler (GER)	52.83	Q
7	10	4	Sergey Fesikov (RUS)	53.03	Q
8	7	5	Shaune Fraser (CAY)	53.05	Q
9	10	5	Takuro Fujii (JPN)	53.12	Q
10	10	3	Tommaso D'Orsogna (AUS)	53.16	Q
11	1	4	John Tapp (CAN)	53.43	Q, NR
12	11	6	Bradley Ally (BAR)	53.62	Q
13	2	8	Sun Xiaolei (CHN)	53.70	Q
14	11	8	Omar Pinzón (COL)	53.74	Q
15	3	2	Tyler Clary (USA)	53.94	Q
16	9	5	Christian Galenda (ITA)	54.02	Q
17	10	6	Martti Aljand (EST)	54.03	
18	2	6	Gal Nevo (ISR)	54.20	
19	9	3	Vytaunas Janusaitis (LTU)	54.24	
19	10	2	Andrejs Dūda (LAT)	54.24	
21	9	8	Graeme John Moore (RSA)	54.27	
22	9	7	Martin Spitzer (AUT)	54.33	
23	9	6	Diogo Carvalho (POR)	54.41	
24	10	7	Dominik Straga (CRO)	54.42	
25	10	8	Diogo Yabe (BRA)	54.60	
26	8	5	Taki Mrabet (TUN)	54.86	
27	11	2	Sverre Naess (NOR)	54.89	
28	8	3	Serkan Atasay (TUR)	55.02	
29	8	2	Aleksey Derlyugov (UZB)	55.09	
30	7	6	Robert Žbogar (SLO)	55.32	
31	8	4	Raphaël Stacchiotti (LUX)	55.45	
32	10	1	Tomáš Klobučník (SVK)	55.89	
33	3	7	Daniel Coakley (PHI)	56.08	
34	3	6	Chen Zuo (CHN)	56.85	
35	7	4	Serghei Golban (MDA)	57.27	
35	8	7	Saeed Malekae Ashtiani (IRI)	57.27	
37	7	2	Juan David Molina (COL)	57.44	
38	6	6	Nicholas James (ZIM)	57.47	
39	2	4	Marawan Hellal (EGY)	57.52	
40	7	3	Amine Kouame (MAR)	57.59	
41	3	5	Leopoldo Andara (VEN)	57.69	
42	8	6	Ensar Hajder (BIH)	57.70	
43	8	1	Gustavo Paschetta (ARG)	57.80	
44	6	4	Jean Luis Apolinar Gómez Nuñez (DOM)	58.24	
45	7	1	Obaid Al-Jasmi (UAE)	58.43	
46	2	7	Rehan Jehangir Poncha (IND)	58.46	
47	6	2	Yousef Alaskari (KUW)	58.61	
48	7	7	Pedro Miguel Pinotes (ANG)	58.79	
49	2	5	Lao Kuan Fong (MAC)	58.80	
50	7	8	Quinton Delie (NAM)	58.94	
51	6	8	Lim Duan Le Kenneth (SIN)	59.18	
52	6	5	Giorgi Mtvralashvili (GEO)	59.21	
53	5	7	Jourdy Martis (AHO)	59.22	
54	6	7	Andrea Agius (MLT)	59.38	
55	5	1	Arturo Alejandro Montilla (DOM)	59.50	
56	5	3	Hycinth Cijntje (AHO)	59.61	
57	5	5	Hazem Abdulwahid Tashkandi (KSA)	1:00.06	
58	5	6	Neil Agius (MLT)	1:00.20	
59	6	1	Tong Antonio (MAC)	1:00.29	
60	4	1	Yellow Yeiyah (NGR)	1:01.11	
61	5	2	Colin Bensadon (GIB)	1:01.18	
62	5	8	Sofyan El Gadi (LBA)	1:03.13	
63	4	5	Dulguun Batsaikhan (MGL)	1:03.57	
64	4	6	Julien Brice (LCA)	1:04.61	
65	4	7	Hamdan Iqbal Bayusuf (KEN)	1:04.65	
66	4	3	Joshua Runako Daniel (LCA)	1:05.32	
67	4	4	Nisar Ahmed (PAK)	1:05.61	
68	4	8	Lim Jyh Jye (BRU)	1:06.06	
69	3	3	Kouassi Franck Olivier Brou (CIV)	1:07.16	
70	2	1	Ronaldo Rodrigues (GUY)	1:07.76	
71	2	2	Tepaia Payne (COK)	1:08.10	
72	3	4	Shailesh Shumsher Rana (NEP)	1:09.20	
73	5	4	Tano Pierre Claver Atta (CIV)	1:10.22	
74	3	8	Inayath Hassan (MDV)	1:10.90	
75	3	1	Giordan Harris (MHL)	1:13.77	
76	4	2	Elio Berberi (ALB)	1:13.84	
–	1	3	Martin Tomasin (BOL)	DNS	
–	6	3	Loai Abdulwahid Tashkandi (KSA)	DNS	
–	9	1	Simon Sjödin (SWE)	DNS	
–	1	5	Godonou Wilfrid Tevoedjre (BEN)	DSQ	
–	8	8	Dmitriy Shvetsov (UZB)	DSQ	
–	9	2	Tomáš Fucík (CZE)	DSQ	
–	11	1	Federico Turrini (ITA)	DSQ	

=== Semifinals ===
Semifinal 1

Rank	Lane	Name	Time	Notes
1	3	Markus Deibler (GER)	52.08	Q
2	5	Kenneth To (AUS)	52.16	Q
3	4	Henrique Rodrigues (BRA)	52.70	Q
4	2	Tommaso D'Orsogna (AUS)	52.85	
5	6	Shaune Fraser (CAY)	52.94	
6	7	Bradley Ally (BAR)	53.12	
7	1	Omar Pinzón (COL)	53.44	
8	8	Christian Galenda (ITA)	53.65	

Semifinal 2

Rank	Lane	Name	Time	Notes
1	4	Ryan Lochte (USA)	50.81	Q, CR
2	5	George Bovell (TRI)	52.23	Q
3	2	Takuro Fujii (JPN)	52.43	Q
4	6	Sergey Fesikov (RUS)	52.51	Q
5	7	John Tapp (CAN)	52.62	Q, NR
6	3	Peter Mankoc (SLO)	52.80	
7	1	Sun Xiaolei (CHN)	53.12	
8	8	Tyler Clary (USA)	53.99	

=== Final ===
Rank	Lane	Name	Time	Notes
1st place, gold medalist(s)	4	Ryan Lochte (USA)	50.86	
2nd place, silver medalist(s)	5	Markus Deibler (GER)	51.69	
3rd place, bronze medalist(s)	7	Sergey Fesikov (RUS)	51.81	
4	6	George Bovell (TRI)	51.97	
5	3	Kenneth To (AUS)	52.20	
6	2	Takuro Fujii (JPN)	52.36	
7	1	John Tapp (CAN)	52.97	
8	8	Henrique Rodrigues (BRA)	53.69	
