= Swimming at the 2010 Asian Games – Women's 200 metre freestyle =

Women's 200 metre freestyle at the 2010 Asian Games
- Venue: Aoti Aquatics Centre
- Date: 13 November 2010
- Competitors: 15 from 8 nations

Medalists
gold medal	Zhu Qianwei	China
silver medal	Tang Yi	China
bronze medal	Hanae Ito	Japan

The women's 200 metre freestyle event at the 2010 Asian Games took place on 13 November 2010 at Guangzhou Aoti Aquatics Centre.

There were 15 competitors from 8 countries who took part in this event. Two heats were held, the heat in which a swimmer competed did not formally matter for advancement, as the swimmers with the top eight times from the entire field qualified for the finals.

Zhu Qianwei and Tang Yi from China won the gold and silver medal respectively, Japanese swimmer Hanae Ito won the bronze medal.

== Schedule ==
All times are China Standard Time (UTC+08:00)

Date	Time	Event
Saturday, 13 November 2010	09:00	Heats
Saturday, 13 November 2010	18:00	Final

== Records ==
Prior to this competition, the existing world, Asian and Games records were as follows.

World Record	Federica Pellegrini (ITA)	1:52.98	Rome, Italy	29 July 2009
Asian Record	Pang Jiaying (CHN)	1:55.05	Beijing, China	13 August 2008
Games Record	Yang Yu (CHN)	1:58.43	Busan, South Korea	30 September 2002

== Results ==
=== Heats ===
Rank	Heat	Athlete	Time	Notes
1	2	Zhu Qianwei (CHN)	1:59.83	
2	2	Haruka Ueda (JPN)	2:00.03	
3	1	Hanae Ito (JPN)	2:00.72	
4	2	Natthanan Junkrajang (THA)	2:03.20	
5	1	Tang Yi (CHN)	2:03.28	
6	2	Ranohon Amanova (UZB)	2:03.85	
7	2	Lee Jae-young (KOR)	2:04.49	
8	2	Quah Ting Wen (SIN)	2:04.70	
9	2	Erica Totten (PHI)	2:04.97	
10	1	Lynette Lim (SIN)	2:05.04	
11	1	Stephanie Au (HKG)	2:05.05	
12	2	Jennifer Town (HKG)	2:06.46	
13	1	Rutai Santadvatana (THA)	2:06.72	
14	1	Ha Eun-ju (KOR)	2:07.08	
15	1	Jasmine Al-Khaldi (PHI)	2:07.60	

=== Final ===
Rank	Athlete	Time	Notes
1st place, gold medalist(s)	Zhu Qianwei (CHN)	1:56.65	GR
2nd place, silver medalist(s)	Tang Yi (CHN)	1:57.08	
3rd place, bronze medalist(s)	Hanae Ito (JPN)	1:58.24	
4	Haruka Ueda (JPN)	1:59.42	
5	Lee Jae-young (KOR)	2:01.94	
6	Quah Ting Wen (SIN)	2:03.73	
7	Ranohon Amanova (UZB)	2:04.90	
8	Natthanan Junkrajang (THA)	2:05.35	
