= 2010 FINA World Swimming Championships (25 m) – Women's 100 metre breaststroke =

Women's 100m Breaststroke at the 2010 Short Course Worlds
- Dates: 17 December 2010 (heats and semifinals); 18 December 2010 (final)
- Competitors: 55
- Winning time: 1:03.98

Medalists
gold medal	Rebecca Soni	United States
silver medal	Leisel Jones	Australia
bronze medal	Ji Liping	China

The Women's 100 Breaststroke at the 2010 FINA World Swimming Championships (25m) was swum 17–18 December in Dubai, United Arab Emirates. Preliminary heats and semifinals were on 17 December, the final on 18 December.

55 swimmers swam the race. At the start of the event, the existing World (WR) and Championship records (CR) were:

- WR: 1:02.70, (United States) Rebecca Soni, (Manchester, UK, 19 December 2009)
- CR: 1:04.22, (United States) Jessica Hardy, (Manchester 2008)

The following records were established during the competition:

Date	Round	Name	Nation	Time	WR	CR
17 December 2010	Semifinals	Rebecca Soni	United States	1:04.17		CR
18 December 2010	Final	Rebecca Soni	United States	1:03.98		CR

== Results ==
=== Heats ===
Rank	Heat	Lane	Name	Time	Notes
1	7	4	Rebecca Soni (USA)	1:04.64	Q
2	1	7	Ji Liping (CHN)	1:05.32	Q
3	6	4	Leisel Jones (AUS)	1:05.36	Q
4	5	5	Yuliya Yefimova (RUS)	1:05.68	Q
5	7	5	Moniek Nijhuis (NED)	1:05.75	Q
6	7	3	Jennie Johansson (SWE)	1:05.79	Q
7	5	4	Rikke Pedersen (DEN)	1:05.84	Q
8	6	6	Sarah Katsoulis (AUS)	1:06.01	Q
9	6	3	Joline Höstman (SWE)	1:06.14	Q
10	5	3	Micah Lawrence (USA)	1:06.53	Q
11	3	4	Alia Atkinson (JAM)	1:06.77	Q
11	6	1	Mina Matsushima (JPN)	1:06.77	Q
13	5	7	Martha McCabe (CAN)	1:06.80	Q
14	5	6	Daria Deyeva (RUS)	1:06.83	Q
15	6	2	Chen Huijia (CHN)	1:07.18	Q
16	4	4	Hrafnhildur Lúthersdóttir (ISL)	1:07.26	Q
17	7	7	Annamay Pierse (CAN)	1:07.45	
18	6	7	Petra Chocová (CZE)	1:07.65	
19	5	2	Chiara Boggiatto (ITA)	1:07.69	
20	6	5	Katharina Stiberg (NOR)	1:07.78	
21	4	6	Caroline Reitshammer (AUT)	1:08.40	
22	6	8	Agustina de Giovanni (ARG)	1:08.60	
23	4	5	Dilara Buse Gunaydin (TUR)	1:08.74	
23	7	2	Rie Kaneto (JPN)	1:08.74	
25	5	8	Stéphanie Spahn (SUI)	1:09.02	
26	5	1	Tatiane Sakemi (BRA)	1:09.03	
27	7	6	Kong Yvette Man Yi (HKG)	1:09.08	
28	7	1	Jane Trepp (EST)	1:09.12	
29	4	3	Tjasa Vozel (SLO)	1:09.36	
30	4	1	Sara Nordenstam (NOR)	1:09.52	
31	3	5	Katheryn Anne Meaklim (RSA)	1:10.02	
32	7	8	Sarra Lajnef (TUN)	1:10.07	
33	4	2	Chen I-Chuan (TPE)	1:10.56	
34	3	1	Anastasia Christoforou (CYP)	1:10.57	
35	3	2	Daniela Victoria (VEN)	1:10.85	
36	3	6	Aurelie Waltzing (LUX)	1:11.22	
37	4	8	Danielle Beaudrun (LCA)	1:11.39	
38	3	7	Lei On Kei (MAC)	1:11.54	
39	1	1	Sin Jin Hui (PRK)	1:13.10	
40	3	8	Daniela Lindemeier (NAM)	1:13.44	
41	4	7	Pham Thi Hue (VIE)	1:13.45	
42	2	7	Patricia Quevedo (PER)	1:14.50	
43	2	4	Melinda Sue Micallef (MLT)	1:15.63	
44	2	5	Elodie Poo Cheong (MRI)	1:16.80	
45	2	3	Pilar Shimizu (GUM)	1:18.36	
46	2	6	Rachael Tonjor (NGR)	1:18.76	
47	2	8	Amanda Liew (BRU)	1:19.71	NR
48	2	2	Mahfuza Khatun (BAN)	1:19.75	
49	1	3	Patricia Cani (ALB)	1:20.42	
50	1	6	Jamila Lunkuse (UGA)	1:20.68	
51	2	1	Anum Bandey (PAK)	1:21.01	
52	1	4	Sehar Saleh (KEN)	1:24.37	
53	1	6	Sonia Cege (KEN)	1:25.05	
54	1	2	Chaemel Morgane Faosite Sogbadji (BEN)	1:41.01	
–	3	3	Sara El Bekri (MAR)	DSQ	

=== Semifinals ===
Semifinal 1

Rank	Lane	Name	Time	Notes
1	4	Ji Liping (CHN)	1:04.78	Q
2	5	Yuliya Yefimova (RUS)	1:05.22	Q
3	6	Sarah Katsoulis (AUS)	1:05.60	Q
4	3	Jennie Johansson (SWE)	1:05.71	Q
5	7	Mina Matsushima (JPN)	1:06.45	
6	1	Daria Deyeva (RUS)	1:06.56	
7	2	Micah Lawrence (USA)	1:07.21	
8	8	Hrafnhildur Lúthersdóttir (ISL)	1:07.30	

Semifinal 2

Rank	Lane	Name	Time	Notes
1	4	Rebecca Soni (USA)	1:04.17	Q, CR
2	5	Leisel Jones (AUS)	1:04.75	Q
3	6	Rikke Pedersen (DEN)	1:05.33	Q
4	3	Moniek Nijhuis (NED)	1:05.92	Q
5	7	Alia Atkinson (JAM)	1:06.05	
6	2	Joline Höstman (SWE)	1:06.13	
7	8	Chen Huijia (CHN)	1:06.66	
8	1	Martha McCabe (CAN)	1:06.77	

=== Final ===
Rank	Lane	Name	Time	Notes
1st place, gold medalist(s)	4	Rebecca Soni (USA)	1:03.98	CR
2nd place, silver medalist(s)	5	Leisel Jones (AUS)	1:04.26	
3rd place, bronze medalist(s)	3	Ji Liping (CHN)	1:04.79	
4	2	Rikke Pedersen (DEN)	1:04.80	
5	1	Jennie Johansson (SWE)	1:05.31	
6	7	Sarah Katsoulis (AUS)	1:05.43	
7	6	Yuliya Yefimova (RUS)	1:05.50	
8	8	Moniek Nijhuis (NED)	1:05.99	
