= 2010 FINA World Swimming Championships (25 m) – Highlights =

Below are daily summaries of the 2010 Short Course Worlds, which occurred December 15–19, 2010 in Dubai, United Arab Emirates.

== Highlights ==
=== Day 1 (15th) ===
In the morning session on the first day of competition, three championships records were broken. The first record came in the men's 200 m freestyle where America's Ryan Lochte went under Ian Thorpe's championship record of 1:43.28 with a time of 1:42.38. In the 100 m breaststroke, Italian swimmer Fabio Scozzoli broke Igor Borysik's championship record of 57.74 with a time of 57.60. In the heats of the 4x100 m freestyle, the championship mark of 3:08.44, set by the U.S. in 2008, was downed in 3:07.78 by the B team of the Russian Federation.

The first evening session of the competition saw five finals. Ryan Lochte won the first gold in the competition in the 200 m freestyle in a championship record time of 1:41.08, bettering his own record. Danila Izotov of Russia took silver while Oussama Mellouli of Tunisia took the bronze. Mireia Belmonte Garcia of Spain won two gold medals, one in the 200 m butterfly and the 400 m individual medley, both times were championship records. In the men's 4x100 m freestyle relay, France won with a time of 3:04.78, which was four hundredth of a second faster than the second placed Russian team. Brazil won the bronze and the United States finished a surprising fourth. The first world record was broken by the Chinese team in the women's 4×200 m freestyle relay in 7:35.94. Australia finished far back in 7:37.57, while France won the bronze. Several semifinals were scheduled and Gao Chang of China broke the championship record in the women's 100 m backstroke race in 56.58, while Mihail Alexandrov from the United States did the same in the men's 100 m breaststroke in 57.18. Stanislav Donets from Russia broke the championship record in the men's 100 m backstroke with a time of 49.62.

=== Day 2 (16th) ===
The morning session of day 2 saw some more championship records. Ryan Lochte marked his third one with a 4:01.76 in the 400 m individual medley, Therese Alshammar from Sweden followed him with a championship record in the 50 m butterfly. Ariana Kukors from the United States also set the championship record in the 100 m individual medley.

During the evening session two more world records were broken. Lochte was the first individual to break a world record and did it in the 400 m individual medley final en route to winning gold. Oussama Mellouli finished second and American Tyler Clary won the bronze. In the men's 4x200 m freestyle relay, Russia smashed the previous world record held by Canada with a time of 6:49.04. The United States finished second and France finished third.

Another seven championship records were broken in the evening session. Stanislav Donets, after breaking the championship record in the men's 100 m backstroke semifinal, recorded his second championship record with a time of 49.07 during the 100 m backstroke final, just missing Nick Thoman's world record of 48.94. In the women's 50 m butterfly semifinals, Felicity Galvez from Australia broke Alshammar's championship record she set in the morning. But in the semifinal right after, Alshammar regained her record with a time of 25.19. Brazilian César Cielo Filho then broke the championship record in the 50 m freestyle semifinals with the time of 20.61. Natalie Coughlin served another record during the women's 100 m backstroke final in 56.08, while Cameron van der Burgh of South Africa also recorded a championship record in a time of 56.80 at the men's 100 m breaststroke final. The last championship record came from Kukors, who was with 58.65 faster than her earlier record which she swam in the morning session.

=== Day 3 (17th) ===
Ryan Lochte continued his stellar performance on the third competition day. He sets a new World record over 200 m individual medley in 1:50.08, which is 1 and a half second faster than the earlier record and won his fourth medal of the championship. This was the only world record that was set on this day 3.

A total of 12 Championship records were set, which six of them coming in finals. Ranomi Kromowidjojo started the hunt for records with a time of 51.45 over 100 m freestyle. Naoya Tomita from Japan was the next one up for a new record over 200 m breaststroke final in 2:03.12, Therese Alshammar was not outdone when she set another championship record in 24.87 over 50 m butterfly. Katie Hoff from the United States recorded another one with a time of 3:57.07 in the 400 m freestyle final, while César Cielo Filho won the fastest event of the competition in 20.51. The Women's 4x100 m medley relay from China was the last one to put up a new record in 3:48.29.

=== Day 4 (18th) ===
Day 4 saw no World records but a bunch of Championship records, 10 to be exact. Half of them came in finals, where Rebecca Soni set the first one over 100 m breaststroke in 1:03.98.Stanislav Donets recorded his next record in a time of 22.93 over 50 m backstroke, Albert Subirats from Venezuela set a new record in the 50 m butterfly final with a time of 22.40. Mireia Belmonte swam in the 200 m individual medley final a new record in 2:05.73, while the Dutch Women's 4x100 m freestyle relay was the last one with a championship record at Day 4 in 3:28.54.

=== Day 5 (19th) ===
The last day of the competition saw 12 finals. Nine champions records were broke in those finals. César Cielo Filho won his second gold medal over Men's 100 m freestyle in 45.74, Zhao Jing from China set a new record in 26.27 at the Women's 50 m backstroke final. Later on, Ryan Lochte broke his fifth record over Men's 200 m backstroke in a time of 1:46.68, while his teammate Rebecca Soni also recorded another bestmark over Women's 200 m breaststroke in 2:16.39. Felicity Galvez set a new record over Women's 100 m butterfly in 55.43, Felipe Silva followed in a time of 25.95 over Men's 50 m breaststroke. In the last single event Camille Muffat broke the championship record over Women's 200 m freestyle with 1:52.29. In the last event of the competition the Men's 4x100 m medley relay of the United States set a new record in 3:20.99, during this race Stanislav Donets from Russia set a new record over the Men's 100 m backstroke in 48.95.
