= Thomas Gossland =

Canadian swimmer (born 1989)

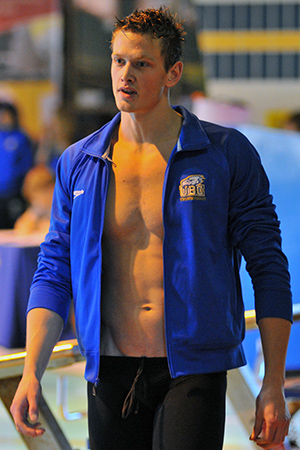
- Gossland with UBC Thunderbirds

Personal information
- Full name: Thomas Gossland
- National team: Canada
- Born: May 10, 1989 (age 37) Richmond, British Columbia
- Height: 183 cm (6 ft 0 in)
- Weight: 78 kg (172 lb)
- Website: tomgossland.com

Sport
- Sport: Swimming
- Strokes: Freestyle
- Club: Pacific Dolphins, Hørsholm Svømmeforening
- College team: University of British Columbia

Thomas Gossland (born May 10, 1989) is a Canadian competition swimmer who represented Canada at the 2012 Summer Olympics in the men's 4×100-metre freestyle relay. Gossland finished tenth in the relay with his teammates Brent Hayden, Richard Hortness and Colin Russell. In 2013 Gossland won a bronze medal at the Swimming World Cup in the 4x50 mixed freestyle relay.

Gossland grew up and learned to swim in Nanaimo. He then moved to Vancouver in 2007 to attend the University of British Columbia, where he competed with the UBC Thunderbirds, UBC's swimming team, and broke records set by Hayden, a future team member in the relay. He then earned a spot on the 2012 Canadian Olympic team at the Olympic trials. He never went to another Olympic Games. However he decided to train as a physics teacher at a secondary school in England and is now a teacher in Thailand along with being a coach at a swimming club in the same region.
