= Plamen Alexandrov =

Bulgarian swimmer (born 1961)

Personal information
- Full name: Plamen Donchev Aleksandrov
- Born: 20 March 1961 (age 65)

Sport
- Sport: Swimming

Plamen Alexandrov (Bulgarian: Пламен Александров; born 20 March 1961) is a Bulgarian swimmer. He competed in two events at the 1980 Summer Olympics.
