= Yevgeny Lagunov =

Russian swimmer

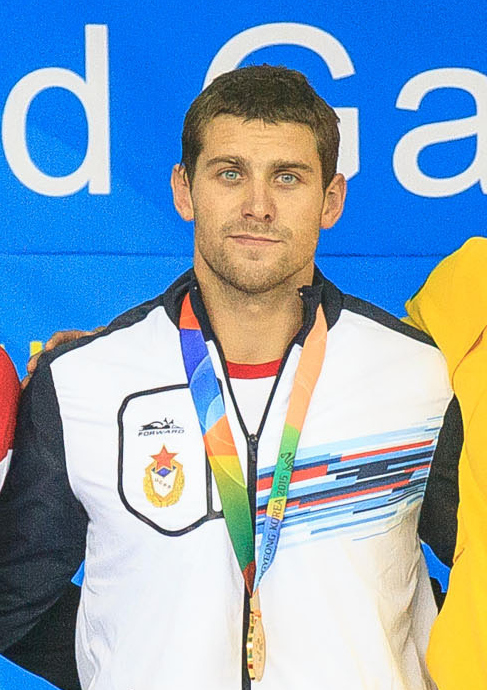
- Lagunov at the 2015 Military World Games

Personal information
- Full name: Yevgeny Alexandrovich Lagunov
- Nationality: Russia
- Born: 14 December 1985 (age 40) Arkhangelsk, Russian SFSR, Soviet Union
- Height: 1.88 m (6 ft 2 in)
- Weight: 77 kg (170 lb)

Sport
- Sport: Swimming
- Strokes: Freestyle
- Club: SKA Sankt Peterburg
Medal record
Representing Russia
Olympic Games
Silver medal – second place	2008 Beijing	4×200 m freestyle
Bronze medal – third place	2012 London	4×100 m freestyle
World Championships (LC)
Silver medal – second place	2005 Montreal	4×100 m medley
Silver medal – second place	2009 Rome	4×100 m freestyle
Silver medal – second place	2009 Rome	4×200 m freestyle
Bronze medal – third place	2007 Melbourne	4×100 m medley
Bronze medal – third place	2013 Barcelona	4×100 m freestyle
World Championships (SC)
Gold medal – first place	2010 Dubai	4×200 m freestyle
Silver medal – second place	2010 Dubai	4×100 m freestyle
Silver medal – second place	2012 Istanbul	4×100 m medley
Bronze medal – third place	2004 Indianapolis	4×100 m medley
Bronze medal – third place	2012 Istanbul	100 m freestyle
European Championships (LC)
Silver medal – second place	2004 Madrid	4×100 m freestyle
Silver medal – second place	2006 Budapest	4×100 m freestyle
Silver medal – second place	2008 Eindhoven	4×200 m freestyle
Gold medal – first place	2010 Budapest	4×100 m freestyle
Gold medal – first place	2010 Budapest	4×200 m freestyle
Silver medal – second place	2010 Budapest	100 m freestyle
Silver medal – second place	2010 Budapest	4×100 m medley
European Championships (SC)
Bronze medal – third place	2005 Trieste	100 m freestyle
Bronze medal – third place	2008 Rijeka	50 m freestyle
Silver medal – second place	2008 Rijeka	4×50 m medley
Bronze medal – third place	2009 Istanbul	100 m freestyle
Silver medal – second place	2010 Eindhoven	100 m freestyle
Bronze medal – third place	2010 Eindhoven	200 m freestyle
Bronze medal – third place	2010 Eindhoven	4×50 m freestyle
Silver medal – second place	2011 Szczecin	4×50 m freestyle
Silver medal – second place	2012 Chartres	100 m freestyle
Silver medal – second place	2012 Chartres	4×50 m freestyle
Silver medal – second place	2012 Chartres	4×50 m medley
Gold medal – first place	2013 Herning	4×50 m freestyle
Gold medal – first place	2013 Herning	4×50 m mixed freestyle
Universiade
Gold medal – first place	2005 Izmir	100 m freestyle
Gold medal – first place	2013 Kazan	4×100 m freestyle
Silver medal – second place	2007 Bangkok	4×200 m freestyle
Bronze medal – third place	2007 Bangkok	4×100 m freestyle
Military World Games
Gold medal – first place	2015 Mungyeong	100 m freestyle

Yevgeny Alexandrovich Lagunov (Russian: Евгений Александрович Лагунов; born 14 December 1985) is a freestyle swimmer from Russia, who won the bronze medal in the 100 m freestyle at the European Short Course Swimming Championships 2005 in Triest, Italy. He also competed in the 2004, 2008 and 2012 Summer Olympics. At the 2008 Summer Olympics he was part of the Russian team that won silver in the 4 × 200 m freestyle relay, and at the 2012 Summer Olympics he won a bronze medal in the 4 × 100 m freestyle.
