= 2010 FINA World Swimming Championships (25 m) – Women's 50 metre butterfly =

Women's 50m Butterfly at the 2010 Short Course Worlds
- Dates: 16 December 2010 (heats and semifinals); 17 December 2010 (final)
- Competitors: 75
- Winning time: 24.87

Medalists
gold medal	Therese Alshammar	Sweden
silver medal	Felicity Galvez	Australia
bronze medal	Jeanette Ottesen	Denmark

The women's 50-metre butterfly event at the 10th FINA World Swimming Championships (25m) took place 16–17 December 2010 in Dubai, United Arab Emirates. The heats and semifinals were swum 16 December; the final on 17 December.

75 swimmers swam the race.

== Records ==
Prior to the competition, the existing world and championship records were as follows.

	Name	Nation	Time	Location	Date
World record	Therese Alshammar	Sweden	24.38	Singapore	22 November 2009
Championship record	Felicity Galvez	Australia	25.32	Manchester	11 April 2008

The following records were established during the competition:

Date	Round	Name	Nation	Time	WR	CR
16 December 2010	Heats	Therese Alshammar	Sweden	25.23		CR
16 December 2010	Semifinals	Felicity Galvez	Australia	25.20		CR
16 December 2010	Semifinals	Therese Alshammar	Sweden	25.19		CR
17 December 2010	Final	Therese Alshammar	Sweden	24.87		CR

== Results ==
=== Preliminary heats ===
Rank	Heat	Lane	Name	Time	Notes
1	9	5	Therese Alshammar (SWE)	25.23	Q, CR
2	10	3	Felicity Galvez (AUS)	25.41	Q
3	10	4	Inge Dekker (NED)	25.67	Q
4	8	5	Triin Aljand (EST)	25.69	Q
5	10	2	Christine Magnuson (USA)	25.76	Q
6	10	5	Jeanette Ottesen (DEN)	25.77	Q
7	8	3	Dana Vollmer (USA)	25.83	Q
8	9	4	Hinkelien Schreuder (NED)	25.97	Q^{*}
9	9	3	Amit Ivry (ISR)	26.17	Q
10	1	5	Lu Ying (CHN)	26.22	Q
11	8	6	Marieke Guehrer (AUS)	26.26	Q
12	10	6	Mélanie Henique (FRA)	26.29	Q
13	10	1	Sze Hang Yu (HKG)	26.33	Q
14	8	4	Ingvild Snildal (NOR)	26.36	Q
15	10	7	Arianna Vanderpool-Wallace (BAH)	26.39	Q
16	8	1	Katerine Savard (CAN)	26.48	Q
17	10	8	Melanie Schweiger (SUI)	26.54	^{*}
18	2	8	Guo Fan (CHN)	26.65	
19	9	6	Annika Saarnak (EST)	26.69	
20	9	7	Daniele de Jesus (BRA)	26.73	
21	6	7	Chanelle van Wyk (RSA)	26.75	
22	8	8	Sara Oliveira (POR)	26.78	
23	8	2	Eszter Dara (HUN)	26.81	
24	9	2	Fabienne Nadarajah (AUT)	26.87	
25	9	8	Mandy Loots (RSA)	26.99	
26	7	5	Katarina Listopadova (SVK)	27.01	
27	9	1	Svetlana Fedulova (RUS)	27.02	
28	7	3	Katarina Milly (SVK)	27.07	
29	7	2	Iris Rosenberger (TUR)	27.09	
30	7	4	Katja Hajdinjak (SLO)	27.12	
31	8	7	Alana Kathryn Dillette (BAH)	27.17	
32	7	7	Jeserik Pinto (VEN)	27.36	
33	7	1	Farida Osman (EGY)	27.48	
34	7	6	Cheng Wan-Jung (TPE)	27.72	
34	7	8	Monica Johannessen (NOR)	27.72	
36	6	4	Cecilia Bertoncello (ARG)	28.02	
37	6	5	Hiroko Sugino (JPN)	28.15	
38	6	2	Elimar Barrios (VEN)	28.32	
39	6	3	Jasmin Rosenberger (TUR)	28.37	
40	5	6	Diana Luna Sánchez (MEX)	28.95	
41	6	6	Ma Cheok Mei (MAC)	28.96	
42	5	4	Marie Laura Meza (CRC)	29.20	
43	4	3	Karen Torrez (BOL)	29.30	NR
44	5	3	Talita Baqlah (JOR)	29.66	
45	5	5	Dalia Torrez (NCA)	29.67	
46	5	1	Nicola Muscat (MLT)	29.77	
47	5	7	Silvie Ketelaars (AHO)	29.93	
48	4	4	Massie Milagros Carrillo (PER)	29.99	
49	5	8	Talisa Pace (MLT)	30.04	
50	4	8	Sylvia Brunlehner (KEN)	30.16	
51	3	7	Kiran Khan (PAK)	30.28	
52	5	2	Emily Chan Chee (MRI)	30.37	
53	4	7	Cheyenne Rova (FIJ)	30.65	
54	4	2	Reshika Udugampola (SRI)	30.77	
55	6	8	Talasha Satish Prabhu (IND)	30.85	
56	4	5	Shannon Austin (SEY)	30.96	
57	1	3	Ri Hyon Gyong (PRK)	30.97	
58	3	6	Tieri Erasito (FIJ)	31.13	
59	3	4	Danielle Bernadine Findlay (ZAM)	31.33	
59	3	5	Judith Ilan Meauri (PNG)	31.33	
61	4	1	Ann-Marie Hepler (MHL)	31.55	
62	4	6	Elaine Reyes (GIB)	31.78	
63	3	3	Michelle Ysrael (GUM)	31.99	
64	6	1	Bayan Jumah (SYR)	32.31	
65	3	1	Soraya Oruya (KEN)	32.97	
66	2	7	Celeste Brown (COK)	33.17	
67	2	3	Patricia Cani (ALB)	33.48	
68	2	1	Debra Daniel (FSM)	33.52	
69	3	2	Zenina Cruz (GUM)	33.53	
70	2	4	Mariam Foum (TAN)	33.80	
71	3	8	Britany van Lange (GUY)	35.29	
72	2	5	Grace Kimball (NMI)	36.04	
73	1	4	Katerina Izmaylova (TJK)	36.73	
74	2	6	Shajan Aminath (MDV)	38.79	
75	2	2	Keanna Villagomez (NMI)	39.14	

^{*} Schreuder scratched the semifinals; therefore 17th-place finisher Schweiger advanced to the semifinals.

=== Semifinals ===
Semifinal 1

Rank	Lane	Name	Time	Notes
1	4	Felicity Galvez (AUS)	25.20	Q, CR
2	3	Jeanette Ottesen (DEN)	25.53	Q
3	5	Triin Aljand (EST)	25.54	Q
4	2	Marieke Guehrer (AUS)	25.76	Q
5	6	Amit Ivry (ISR)	26.05	
6	1	Arianna Vanderpool-Wallace (BAH)	26.36	
7	7	Sze Hang Yu (HKG)	26.46	
8	8	Melanie Schweiger (SUI)	26.58	

Semifinal 2

Rank	Lane	Name	Time	Notes
1	4	Therese Alshammar (SWE)	25.19	Q, CR
2	2	Lu Ying (CHN)	25.41	Q
3	5	Inge Dekker (NED)	25.45	Q
4	3	Christine Magnuson (USA)	25.65	Q
5	6	Dana Vollmer (USA)	25.84	
6	7	Mélaine Henique (FRA)	25.91	
7	1	Ingvild Snildal (NOR)	26.21	
8	8	Katerine Savard (CAN)	26.49	

=== Final ===
Rank	Lane	Name	Time	Notes
1st place, gold medalist(s)	4	Therese Alshammar (SWE)	24.87	CR
2nd place, silver medalist(s)	5	Felicity Galvez (AUS)	24.90	
3rd place, bronze medalist(s)	2	Jeanette Ottesen (DEN)	25.24	
4	3	Lu Ying (CHN)	25.34	
5	6	Inge Dekker (NED)	25.48	
6	7	Triin Aljand (EST)	25.61	
7	1	Christine Magnuson (USA)	25.74	
8	8	Marieke Guehrer (AUS)	25.96	
