= Mihail Alexandrov =

Bulgarian swimmer (born 1985)

Mike Alexandrov
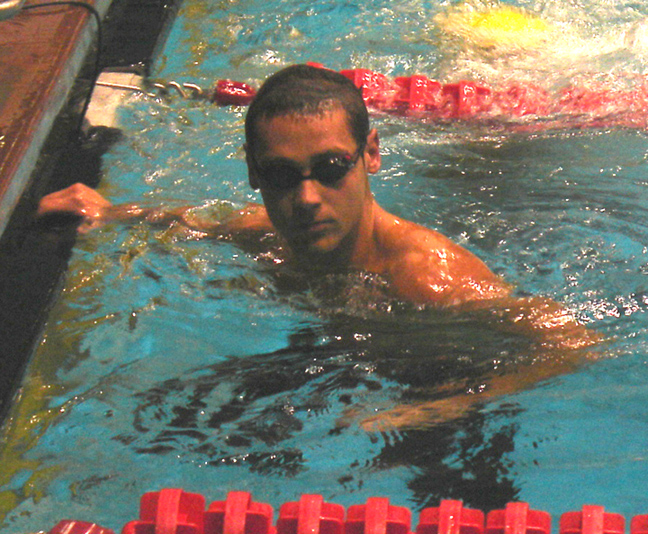

Personal information
- Full name: Mihail Plamenov Aleksandrov; Михаил Александров
- Nickname: "Mike"
- National team: Bulgaria (2004−2008) / United States (2009–)
- Born: April 9, 1985 (age 41) Sofia, Bulgaria
- Height: 1.93 m (6 ft 4 in)
- Weight: 88 kg (194 lb)
- Relatives: Plamen Alexandrov, Father

Sport
- Sport: Swimming
- Strokes: Freestyle, Breaststroke, Individual Medley
- Club: Sofia Olympedia; Champaign County Aquachiefs
- College team: Northwestern University
- Coach: Plamen Alexandrov; Bob Groseth (Northwestern)
Medal record
Men's swimming
Representing the United States
World Championships (SC)
Gold medal – first place	2010 Dubai	4×100 m medley
Gold medal – first place	2012 Istanbul	4×100 m medley
Summer Universiade
Silver medal – second place	2013 Kazan	100 m breaststroke
Bronze medal – third place	2013 Kazan	4×100 m medley
Representing Bulgaria
European Championships (SC)
Bronze medal – third place	2007 Debrecen	100 m breaststroke
Bronze medal – third place	2007 Debrecen	200 m breaststroke

Mihail Alexandrov (Bulgarian: Михаил Александров) (born April 9, 1985) is an Olympic swimmer from Bulgaria. He swam for Bulgaria at the 2004 and 2008 Olympics. Alexandrov has been swimming for the USA since 2009.

== Early life ==
Alexandrov was born April 9, 1985, in Sofia, Bulgaria to father, Olympic athlete Plamen Alexandrov and mother, Kalinka Alexandrov. His father Plamen, a 2000 Olympian in breastroke and individual medlay events, was one of his earliest and more influential coaches, and first taught him breaststroke, believing Mihail had a natural propensity for the stroke. Mihail moved to Champaign, Illinois in the United States with his family by the age of eight. At Champaign Centennial High School, he established school records in seven events, with a backstroke specialty. During his high school years, he was a team Most Valuable Player and earned All-state honors. In 2003 at the age of 15–17 in world rankings, he was rated fifth in the 200 Individual Medley, fourth in the 400 individual medley, and fifth in the 200 Individual Medley.

== Northwestern University ==
Alexandrov, who has dual Bulgarian/USA citizenship, swam for the USA's Northwestern University from 2003 to 2007 where he competed for ASCA Hall of Fame Head Coach Bob Groseth, and Assistant Coaches that included Jarod Schroeder. At Northwestern, specializing in IM and breaststroke, Alexandrov established a new NCAA record in the 100 breaststroke, winning the 2007 NCAA Championship title in the event. At the 2007 NCAA championships, he also competed in the breaststroke portion of Northwestern's 400-medley relay team that that won the title in the event, and broke an NCAA record. Northwestern team finished sixth nationally that year, its best finish in recent history.

Alexandrov had three titles at the NCAA Championships, was the recipient of All-America honors 24 times. He was a first-team Big Ten selection in four instances. He set three conference records during his time at Northwestern. He was named the Big Ten Swimmer of the 2007 Conference Championships.

In March 2007 he set a USA National Record in the 100 yard breaststroke (51.56) at the NCAA Division I Swimming and Diving Championships, while swimming for Northwestern. This was despite the fact that he had not swum internationally for the US at that time and that he was viewed as a Bulgarian swimmer. The USA Swimming rules at the time allowed for the USA National mark to be set by a swimmer who could represent the US in international competition (his dual citizenship allowed for this) and who at the time of the swim was not representing another country (he was swimming for the country-neutral Northwestern University at the time of the swim). USA Swimming's rules have subsequently been altered so that only swimmers currently representing the USA internationally can set the "American" Record. Alexandrov's record was broken in 2012 by Kevin Cordes.

== Olympics ==
Swimming for Bulgaria as a multi-stroke competitor at the 2004 Summer Olympics in Greece, he swam the 200-meter freestyle finishing 31st, the 200-meter breaststroke finishing 28th, and the 200-meter Individual Medley finishing 18th. At the 2008 Beijing Olympics, again representing Bulgaria, he swam the 100-meter breaststroke finishing 11th, the 200-meter breaststroke finishing 24th and the 200-meter Individual Medley finishing 20th.

=== Careers ===
Alexandrov has worked as a personal trainer in the Los Angeles area where he also coaches swimming.
