= Sun Xiaolei =

Chinese swimmer (born 1986)

Medal record

Men's swimming

Representing China

World Championships (SC)
Silver medal – second place	2010 Dubai	50 m backstroke

Sun Xiaolei (born 1986-01-12 in Zhejiang) is a Chinese swimmer, who competed for Team China at the 2008 Summer Olympics.

== Major achievements ==
- 2007 National Championships - 1st 50m back
