= Sara Al-Flaij =

Bahraini swimmer

Sarah Alfalaij
Personal information
- Full name: Sarah Abdulrahman Alfalaij
- Nationality: Bahraini
- Born: August 3, 1995 (age 30) United States
- Height: 5 ft 7 in (1.70 m) (2012)
- Weight: 62 kg (137 lb) (2012)

Sport
- Sport: Swimming
- Strokes: Breaststroke, freestyle
- Coach: Khalid Ahmed

Sarah Alfalaij (born 3 August 1995) is a Bahraini swimmer. She competed in the women's 50m freestyle in the 2012 Summer Olympics as part of the Bahraini Olympic team.

== Career ==
Sarah participated in the 2010 Asian Games in the 50m freestyle and 50m breaststroke events in Guangzhou, China.

She also competed in the 2011 World Aquatics Championships, also in the women's 50m freestyle and women's 100m freestyle.

She competed in the women's 50m freestyle at the 2012 London Olympics, finishing with a time of 33.81 seconds, which is her personal best having broken her previous record of 33.98 seconds.

She is coached by Bahraini Khalid Ahmed, who also coaches fellow Bahraini swimmer Khalid Baba.

== Personal life ==
Sarah played for the Southern Governorate club in 2012.
