= 2010 FINA World Swimming Championships (25 m) – Men's 200 metre freestyle =

Men's 200m Freestyle at the 2010 Short Course Worlds
- Dates: 15 December 2010
- Competitors: 78
- Winning time: 1:41.08

Medalists
gold medal	Ryan Lochte	United States
silver medal	Danila Izotov	Russia
bronze medal	Oussama Mellouli	Tunisia

The Men's 200 Freestyle at the 10th FINA World Swimming Championships (25m) was swum 15 December 2010 in Dubai, United Arab Emirates. 78 individuals swam in the Preliminary heats in the morning, with the top-8 finishers advanced to the final that evening.

At the start of the event, the existing World (WR) and Championship records (CR) were:

	Name	Nation	Time	Location	Date
WR	Paul Biedermann	Germany	1:39.37	Berlin	15 November 2009
CR	Ian Thorpe	Australia	1:43.28	Hong Kong	1 April 1999

The following records were established during the competition:

Date	Round	Name	Nation	Time	WR	CR
15 December 2010	Heats	Ryan Lochte	United States	1:42.38		CR
15 December 2010	Final	Ryan Lochte	United States	1:41.08		CR

== Results ==
=== Heats ===
Rank	Heat	Lane	Name	Time	Notes
1	10	5	Ryan Lochte (USA)	1:42.38	Q, CR
2	8	5	Oussama Mellouli (TUN)	1:42.41	Q
3	9	3	Nikita Lobintsev (RUS)	1:42.59	Q
4	9	5	Paul Biedermann (GER)	1:42.73	Q
5	9	7	Shaune Fraser (CAY)	1:42.98	Q
6	9	4	Paweł Korzeniowski (POL)	1:43.05	Q
7	8	4	Danila Izotov (RUS)	1:43.20	Q
8	9	2	Tommaso D'Orsogna (AUS)	1:43.25	Q
9	8	6	Dominik Meichtry (SUI)	1:43.29	
10	10	3	Yannick Agnel (FRA)	1:43.51	
11	1	5	Jiang Haiqi (CHN)	1:43.63	
12	10	6	Peter Vanderkaay (USA)	1:43.82	
13	9	6	Markus Rogan (AUT)	1:44.00	
14	10	4	Filippo Magnini (ITA)	1:44.21	
15	8	2	Kyle Richardson (AUS)	1:44.29	
16	10	8	Chad le Clos (RSA)	1:44.65	
17	1	6	Clément Lefert (FRA)	1:44.82	
18	8	3	Mads Glæsner (DEN)	1:45.14	
19	10	7	Ahmed Mathlouthi (TUN)	1:45.16	
20	9	1	Fernando Santos (BRA)	1:45.52	
21	6	5	Cristian Quintero (VEN)	1:46.12	
22	6	2	Daniele Tirabassi (VEN)	1:46.55	
23	10	1	Rodrigo Castro (BRA)	1:46.60	
24	7	2	Hassaan Abdel Khalik (CAN)	1:46.83	
25	1	3	Jiang Yuhui (CHN)	1:47.26	
26	8	7	Romāns Miloslavskis (LAT)	1:47.48	
27	7	1	Wong Kai Wai David (HKG)	1:47.51	
28	10	2	Gard Kvale (NOR)	1:47.66	
29	4	8	Sebastián Jahnsen Madico (PER)	1:47.91	
30	8	8	Serhiy Frolov (UKR)	1:48.42	
31	7	6	Martín Kutscher (URU)	1:48.73	
32	7	5	Christian Scherübl (AUT)	1:48.95	
33	8	1	Robin Andréasson (SWE)	1:49.01	
34	6	7	Ensar Hajder (BIH)	1:49.09	
35	9	8	David Ernstsson (SWE)	1:49.47	
36	7	8	Vladimir Sidorkin (EST)	1:49.59	
37	1	2	Gal Nevo (ISR)	1:49.69	
38	6	4	Charles Hockin Brusquetti (PAR)	1:49.86	
39	6	1	Grant Beahan (ZIM)	1:49.96	
40	5	3	Mohamed Farhoud (EGY)	1:50.09	
41	7	3	Saeed Malekae Ashtiani (IRI)	1:50.59	
42	6	6	Petr Romashkin (UZB)	1:50.68	
43	7	4	Artur Dilman (KAZ)	1:50.94	
44	5	4	Irakli Revishvili (GEO)	1:51.29	
45	6	3	Vasilii Danilov (KGZ)	1:51.94	
46	5	6	Morad Berrada (MAR)	1:52.31	
47	7	7	Oleg Rabota (KAZ)	1:52.90	
48	5	1	Sebastian Arispe (PER)	1:53.10	
49	4	2	Matthew Abeysinghe (SRI)	1:53.64	
50	3	2	Edward Caruana Dingli (MLT)	1:54.32	
51	6	8	Mohammed Madouh (KUW)	1:54.47	
52	3	4	José Montoya (CRC)	1:54.78	
52	4	1	Hazem Tashkandi (KSA)	1:54.78	
54	4	4	Tong Antonio (MAC)	1:55.10	
55	5	8	Quinton Delie (NAM)	1:55.31	
56	5	2	Sauod Altayar (KUW)	1:55.38	
57	4	3	Kevin Avila Soto (GUA)	1:55.46	
58	5	7	Ngou Pok Man (MAC)	1:56.00	
59	4	6	Colin Bensadon (GIB)	1:56.42	
60	5	5	Edvin Angjeli (ALB)	1:56.47	
61	3	5	Neil Agius (MLT)	1:57.26	
62	3	6	Makram Fatoul (LIB)	1:57.97	
63	4	7	James Sanderson (GIB)	1:58.12	
64	3	7	Derrick Bakhuis (AHO)	1:58.36	
65	3	3	Abdoul Khadre Mbaye Niane (SEN)	1:59.95	
66	3	1	Faisal Al Jasmi (UAE)	2:01.96	
67	3	8	Martín Tomasin (BOL)	2:03.07	
68	2	6	Gert Kacani (ALB)	2:03.46	
69	2	4	Samer Kamal (JOR)	2:03.63	
70	2	2	Anderson Lim (BRU)	2:05.77	
71	2	5	Israr Hussain (PAK)	2:06.12	
72	2	3	Nisar Ahmed (PAK)	2:06.70	
73	1	7	Zachary Payne (COK)	2:07.87	
74	2	7	Ronaldo Rodrigues (GUY)	2:08.95	
75	2	8	Kouassi Brou (CIV)	2:16.64	
76	1	4	Mamadou Fofana (MLI)	2:46.11	
77	2	1	Godonou Wilfrid Tevoedjre (BEN)	2:50.93	
	4	5	Loai Abdulwahid Tashkandi (KSA)	DNS	

=== Final ===
Rank	Lane	Name	Nationality	Time	Notes
1st place, gold medalist(s)	4	Ryan Lochte	United States	1:41.08	CR
2nd place, silver medalist(s)	1	Danila Izotov	Russia	1:41.70	
3rd place, bronze medalist(s)	5	Oussama Mellouli	Tunisia	1:42.02	
4	3	Nikita Lobintsev	Russia	1:42.03	
5	6	Paul Biedermann	Germany	1:42.19	
6	7	Paweł Korzeniowski	Poland	1:42.73	
7	8	Tommaso D'Orsogna	Australia	1:42.96	
8	2	Shaune Fraser	Cayman Islands	1:43.91	
