= Tang Yi =

Chinese swimmer (born 1993)

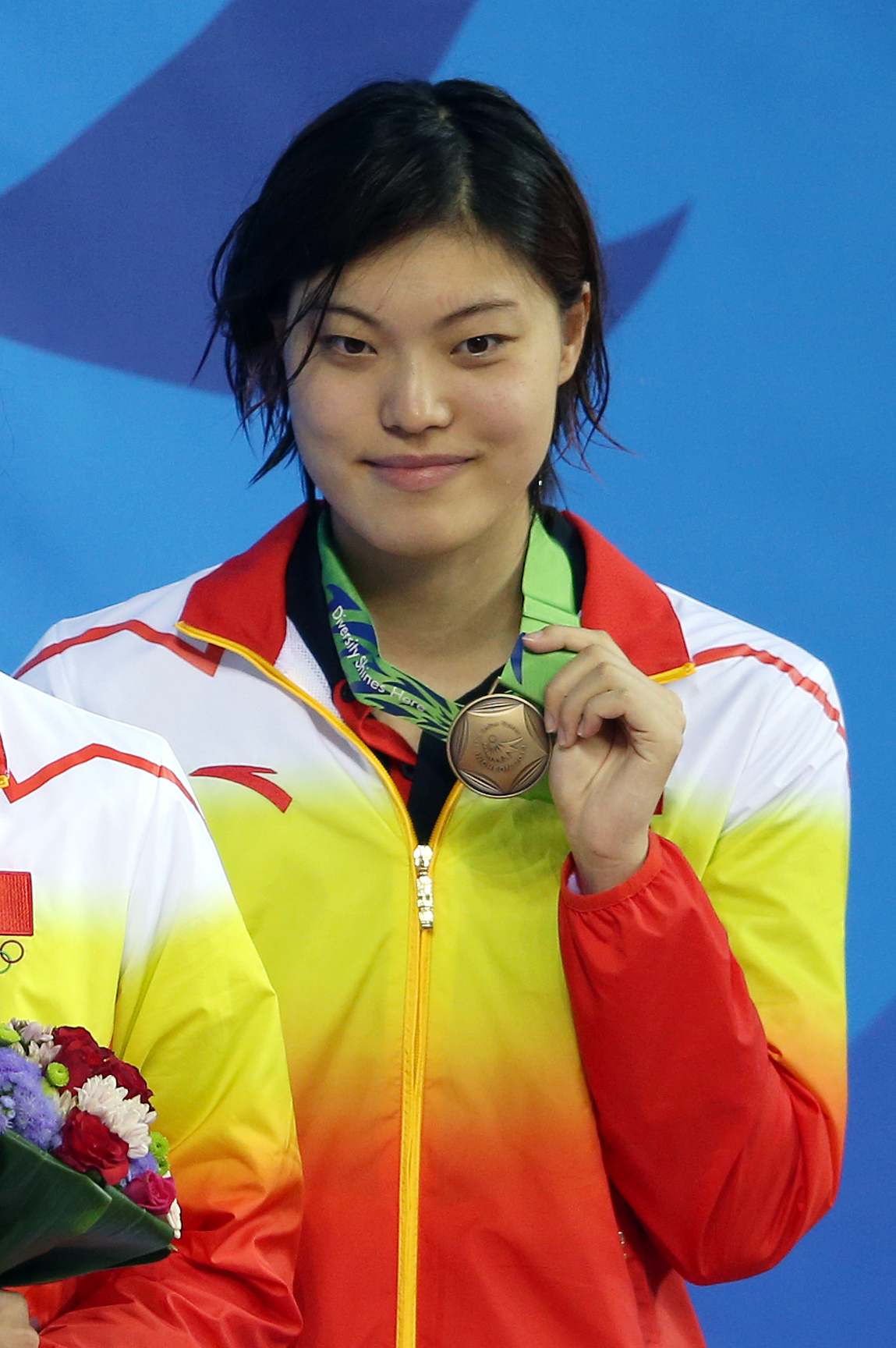
- Tang Yi at the 2012 Summer Olympics

Personal information
- Born: 唐奕; 8 January 1993 (age 33)
- Height: 1.77 m (5 ft 10 in)
- Weight: 65 kg (143 lb)

Sport
- Sport: Swimming
- Strokes: Freestyle
Medal record
Women's swimming
Representing China
Olympic Games
Bronze medal – third place	2012 London	100 m freestyle
World Championships (LC)
Silver medal – second place	2011 Shanghai	4×100 m medley
Bronze medal – third place	2011 Shanghai	4×200 m freestyle
World Championships (SC)
Gold medal – first place	2010 Dubai	4×200 m freestyle
Gold medal – first place	2010 Dubai	4×100 m medley
Bronze medal – third place	2010 Dubai	4×100 m freestyle
Bronze medal – third place	2012 Istanbul	100 m freestyle
Bronze medal – third place	2012 Istanbul	4×200 m freestyle
Asian Games
Gold medal – first place	2006 Doha	4×200m freestyle
Gold medal – first place	2010 Guangzhou	100m freestyle
Gold medal – first place	2010 Guangzhou	4×100 m freestyle
Gold medal – first place	2010 Guangzhou	4×200 m freestyle
Gold medal – first place	2010 Guangzhou	4×100 m medley
Gold medal – first place	2014 Incheon	4×200 m freestyle
Silver medal – second place	2010 Guangzhou	50m freestyle
Silver medal – second place	2010 Guangzhou	200m freestyle
Youth Olympic Games
Gold medal – first place	2010 Singapore	50m freestyle
Gold medal – first place	2010 Singapore	100m freestyle
Gold medal – first place	2010 Singapore	200m freestyle
Gold medal – first place	2010 Singapore	Girls' 4×100 m freestyle
Gold medal – first place	2010 Singapore	Mixed 4×100 m freestyle
Gold medal – first place	2010 Singapore	Mixed 4×100 m medley
Summer Universiade
Gold medal – first place	2011 Shenzhen	100 m freestyle
Gold medal – first place	2011 Shenzhen	4×100 m medley
Bronze medal – third place	2011 Shenzhen	4×100 m freestyle
Bronze medal – third place	2011 Shenzhen	4×200 m freestyle

Tang Yi (Chinese: 唐奕; born 8 January 1993) is a Chinese competitive swimmer. Specializing in the freestyle, she swam for China at the 2008 Summer Olympics and won a bronze medal in the 100 metre freestyle at the 2012 Summer Olympics. She was born in Shanghai.

In addition to her Olympic medal, Tang has won six gold medals at the 2010 Summer Youth Olympics, eight medals (six gold, two silver) at the Asian Games, seven medals (two gold, one silver, four bronze) at the World Championships, and four medals (two gold, two bronze) at the Summer Universiade.

== Major achievements ==
- 2006 World Junior Championships – 2nd 200m free;
- 2006 Asian Games – 1st 4 × 200 m freestyle relay;
- 2006 Shanghai Winter Championships – 1st 200m freestyle;
- 2007 World Youth Day Tournament – 1st 200m freestyle;
- 2007 Japan International Invitational – 2nd 4 × 100 m freestyle relay;
- 2007 World Championships – 7th 4 × 100 m freestyle relay;
- 2008 National Championships & Olympic Selective Trials – 4th 100m freestyle
- 2010 Summer Youth Olympics – 1st Mixed 4 × 100 m freestyle relay
- 2010 Summer Youth Olympics – 1st Women's 100m freestyle
- 2010 Summer Youth Olympics – 1st Women' 4 × 100 m freestyle relay
- 2010 Summer Youth Olympics – 1st Women's 200m freestyle
- 2010 Summer Youth Olympics – 1st Women's 50m freestyle
- 2010 Summer Youth Olympics – 1st Mixed' 4 × 100 m medley relay

== See also ==
- China at the 2012 Summer Olympics#Swimming
