= Mary Al-Atrash =

Palestinian swimmer

Personal information
- Nickname: Palestinian Fish
- Nationality: Palestinian
- Born: 27 June 1994 (age 32)

Sport
- Sport: Swimming

Mary Al-Atrash (born 27 June 1994) is a Palestinian swimmer. She competed in the women's 50 metre freestyle event at the 2016 Summer Olympics, where she ranked 62nd with a time of 28.76 seconds. She did not advance to the semifinals. She was the Palestinian flag bearer in the closing ceremony.
