= Ji Liping =

Chinese swimmer (born 1988)

Personal information
- Nationality: China
- Born: December 9, 1988 (age 37) Shanghai
- Height: 1.79 m (5 ft 10 1/2 in)
- Weight: 58 kg (128 lb)

Sport
- Sport: Swimming
- Strokes: Breaststroke
Medal record
World Championships (LC)
Silver medal – second place	2011 Shanghai	4×100 m medley
Bronze medal – third place	2011 Shanghai	100 m breaststroke
World Championships (SC)
Bronze medal – third place	2010 Dubia	100 m breaststroke
Asian Games
Gold medal – first place	2006 Doha	50 m breaststroke
Gold medal – first place	2010 Guangzhou	100 m breaststroke
Silver medal – second place	2006 Doha	100 m breaststroke
Bronze medal – third place	2010 Guangzhou	200 m breaststroke

Ji Liping (Chinese: 季丽萍; born December 9, 1988, Shanghai) is a Chinese swimmer. She competed at the 2012 Summer Olympics, in the 200 m breaststroke and the 4 × 100 m medley relay.

== See also ==
- China at the 2012 Summer Olympics § Swimming
