= Jeong Da-rae =

South Korean swimmer (born 1991)

Personal information
- Full name: Jeong Da-rae
- National team: South Korea
- Born: 2 December 1991 (age 34) Yeosu, South Jeolla Province, South Korea
- Height: 1.73 m (5 ft 8 in)
- Weight: 64 kg (141 lb)
- Spouse: Unknown (m. 2022)

Sport
- Sport: Swimming
- Strokes: Breaststroke
- Club: Jeollanam Sports
Medal record
Women's swimming
Representing South Korea
Asian Games
Gold medal – first place	2010 Guangzhou	200 m breaststroke
East Asian Games
Silver medal – second place	2009 Hong Kong	200 m breaststroke

- Jeong Da-rae
- Hangul: 정다래
- RR: Jeong Darae
- MR: Chŏng Tarae

Jeong Da-rae (Korean: 정다래; born December 2, 1991) is a South Korean former swimmer, who specialized in breaststroke events. She is a gold medalist in the 200 m breaststroke at the 2010 Asian Games in Guangzhou, China.

Jeong made her official debut, as a 16-year-old, at the 2008 Summer Olympics in Beijing, where she qualified for the women's 200 m breaststroke. She cleared a FINA B-cut of 2:27.78 from the Good Luck Beijing China Open. On the evening preliminaries, Jeong rounded out the semifinal field by taking the final spot in a lifetime best of 2:27.28, just half a second (0.50) faster than her entry time. The next morning's session, Jeong failed to qualify for the final, as she placed fourteenth overall in the semifinal run at 2:28.28.

At the 2009 FINA World Championships in Rome, Italy, Jeong matched her preliminary heat time of 2:25.00 in the semifinals, but finished only in twelfth place. Six months later, she edged out her teammate Jung Seul-ki to take a silver medal by a two-tenth margin (0.20) in the same discipline at the East Asian Games in Hong Kong, breaking her personal best of 2:24.90.

At the 2010 Asian Games in Guangzhou, Jeong picked up the women's 200 m breaststroke title in 2:25.02, beating two Chinese swimmers for the silver and bronze medals. Jeong's best effort at the Asian Games moved her up to fifteenth in the world rankings.

Four years after competing in her first Olympics, Jeong qualified for her second South Korean team, as a 20-year-old, at the 2012 Summer Olympics in London. She attained a FINA A-standard entry time of 2:26.07 from the Dong-A Swimming Tournament in Ulsan. Jeong shared a fourteenth-fastest qualifying time of 2:26.83 with Russia's Yuliya Efimova in the morning's preliminary heats to secure a spot for the semifinals. On the evening session, Jeong failed to qualify for the final, as she finished her semifinal run with a slowest time of 2:28.74.

== Personal life ==
On August 10, 2022, Jeong posted a wedding dress on Instagram that she will marry her non-celebrity boyfriend in September 2022.
