= Chen Huijia =

Chinese swimmer (born 1990)

Medal record

Women's swimming

Representing China

World Championships (LC)
| Gold medal – first place | 2009 Rome | 4×100 m medley relay |

Chen Huijia (born April 5, 1990 in Wenzhou, Zhejiang) is a female Chinese swimmer, who competed for Team China at the 2008 Summer Olympics.

== Major achievements ==
- 2005 National Games - 5th 100m breaststroke;
- 2007 National Championships - 1st 50m breaststroke;
- 2007 National Intercity Games - 3rd 100m breaststroke;
- 2008 National Championships - 1st 100m breaststroke
- 2009 Asian Swimming Championships - 1st 50m breast, 1st 100m breast, 4th 200 breast
