= Gantömöriin Oyuungerel =

Mongolian swimmer (born 1992)

Personal information
- Born: Гантөмөрийн Оюунгэрэл; 19 May 1992 (age 34)
- Height: 1.65 m (5 ft 5 in)
- Weight: 54 kg (119 lb)

Sport
- Country: Mongolia
- Sport: Swimming
- Event: 100m Breaststroke
- Updated on 6 August 2012

Gantömöriin Oyuungerel (Mongolian: Гантөмөрийн Оюунгэрэл; born 19 May 1992) is a Mongolian swimmer. She competed for Mongolia at the 2012 Summer Olympics. She is a member of the Church of Jesus Christ of Latter-day Saints.
