= Back Su-yeon =

South Korean swimmer (born 1991)

Personal information
- Nationality: South Korea
- Born: 1 July 1991 (age 35) Seoul, South Korea
- Height: 1.73 m (5 ft 8 in)
- Weight: 61 kg (134 lb)

Korean name
- Hangul: 백수연
- RR: Baek Suyeon
- MR: Paek Suyŏn

Sport
- Sport: Swimming
- Strokes: Breaststroke
- Club: Kang-won-do Cheong
Medal record
Women's swimming
Representing South Korea
Asian Games
Bronze medal – third place	2006 Doha	100 m breaststroke

Back Su-yeon (Korean: 백수연; born July 1, 1991, in Seoul) is a South Korean swimmer, who specialized in breaststroke events. She edged out her teammate Jung Seul-Ki to take a bronze medal by 0.31 of a second in the 200 m breaststroke at the 2010 Asian Games in Guangzhou, China, with a time of 1:10.22. Back is also a member of Kang-won-do Cheong swimming club in Seoul. Previously in 2006, Back had won bronze in the 100 m breaststroke at the 2006 Asian Games.

Back qualified for the women's 200 m breaststroke at the 2012 Summer Olympics in London, by eclipsing the FINA A-standard entry time of 2:26.61 at the FINA World Championships in Shanghai, China. Back shared the seventh fastest qualifying time of 2:25.76 with China's Ji Liping in the morning's preliminary heats to secure a spot for the semifinals. In the evening session, Back missed out the final; the top eight fastest swimmers in the semifinals qualified and she was the ninth fastest swimmer; 0.21 of a second behind the eighth-fastest qualifier, lowering her Olympic time to 2:24.67. In the same year, she won two silver medals, in the 100 and 200 m breaststroke at the Asian Championships.

She competed in the 200 m breaststroke at the 2016 Summer Olympics, but did not qualify from the heats.
