= List of Lesotho records in swimming =

The Lesotho records in swimming are the fastest ever performances of swimmers from Lesotho, which are recognised and ratified by the Lesotho Swimmers Association.

All records were set in finals unless noted otherwise.

== Long Course (50 m) ==
=== Men ===
Event	Time		Name	Club	Date	Meet	Location	Ref
50 m freestyle	29.56	h	Refiloe Chopho	Lesotho	16 February 2024	World Championships	Doha, Qatar	
100 m freestyle	1:14.95	h	Boipelo Makhothi	Lesotho	6 October 2010	Commonwealth Games	New Delhi, India	
200 m freestyle								
400 m freestyle								
800 m freestyle								
1500 m freestyle								
50 m backstroke	40.72		Boipelo Makhothi	Lesotho	31 March 2007	World Championships	Melbourne, Australia	
100 m backstroke	1:32.14	h	Boipelo Makhothi	Lesotho	25 March 2007	World Championships	Melbourne, Australia	
200 m backstroke								
50 m breaststroke	35.57	sf	Nts'Eke Setho	Lesotho	19 August 2010	Youth Olympic Games	Singapore, Singapore	
100 m breaststroke	1:23.42	h, †	Nts'Eke Setho	Lesotho	24 July 2014	Commonwealth Games	Glasgow, Great Britain	
200 m breaststroke	3:05.18	h	Nts'Eke Setho	Lesotho	24 July 2014	Commonwealth Games	Glasgow, Great Britain	
50 m butterfly	34.21	h	Refiloe Chopo	Lesotho	23 July 2023	World Championships	Fukuoka, Japan	
100 m butterfly								
200 m butterfly								
200 m individual medley								
400 m individual medley								
4×100 m freestyle relay	5:42.96		Thabiso Baholo (1:22.22); Lehlohonolo Moromella (1:34.45); Boipelo Makhothi (1:18.30); Seele Benjamin Ntai (1:27.99)	Lesotho	25 March 2007	World Championships	Melbourne, Australia	
4×200 m freestyle relay								
4×100 m medley relay								

Legend: # – Record awaiting ratification by Lesotho Swimmers Association; WR – World record; AF – African record; e – equalled existing record;
Records not set in finals: h – heat; sf – semifinal; r – relay 1st leg; rh – relay heat 1st leg; b – B final; † – en route to final mark; so – swim-off; tt – time trial

=== Women ===
Event	Time		Name	Club	Date	Meet	Location	Ref
50m freestyle	42.35	h	Masempe Theko	Lesotho	3 August 2012	Olympic Games	London, United Kingdom	
100 m freestyle								
200 m freestyle								
400 m freestyle								
800 m freestyle								
1500 m freestyle								
50 m backstroke								
100 m backstroke								
200 m backstroke								
50 m breaststroke								
100 m breaststroke								
200 m breaststroke								
50 m butterfly								
100 m butterfly								
200 m butterfly								
200 m individual medley								
400 m individual medley								
4×100 m freestyle relay								
4×200 m freestyle relay								
4×100 m medley relay								

Legend: # – Record awaiting ratification by Lesotho Swimmers Association; WR – World record; AF – African record; e – equalled existing record;
Records not set in finals: h – heat; sf – semifinal; r – relay 1st leg; rh – relay heat 1st leg; b – B final; † – en route to final mark; so – swim-off; tt – time trial

== Short Course (25 m) ==
=== Men ===
Event	Time		Name	Club	Date	Meet	Location	Ref
50m freestyle	30.18	h	Khosi Mokhesi	Lesotho	18 October 2008	World Cup	Durban, South Africa	
100m freestyle	1:15.69	h	Boipelo Makhothi	Lesotho	16 October 2009	World Cup	Durban, South Africa	
200 m freestyle								
400 m freestyle								
800 m freestyle								
1500 m freestyle								
50m backstroke	44.06	h	Tsepo Mafa	Lesotho	17 October 2009	World Cup	Durban, South Africa	
100 m backstroke								
200 m backstroke								
50m breaststroke	34.53	h	Ntseke Setho	Lesotho	15 December 2012	World Championships	Istanbul, Turkey	
100m breaststroke	1:33.22	h	Khosi Mokhesi	Lesotho	16 October 2009	World Cup	Durban, South Africa	
200 m breaststroke								
50 m butterfly								
100 m butterfly								
200 m butterfly								
100 m individual medley								
200 m individual medley								
400 m individual medley								
4×50 m freestyle relay								
4×100 m freestyle relay								
4×200 m freestyle relay								
4×50 m medley relay								
4×100 m medley relay								

Legend: # – Record awaiting ratification by Lesotho Swimmers Association; WR – World record; AF – African record; e – equalled existing record;
Records not set in finals: h – heat; sf – semifinal; r – relay 1st leg; rh – relay heat 1st leg; b – B final; † – en route to final mark; so – swim-off; tt – time trial

=== Women ===
Event	Time		Name	Club	Date	Meet	Location	Ref
50m freestyle	38.45	h	Khahliso Caroline Mpeta	Lesotho	12 December 2012	World Championships	Istanbul, Turkey	
100m freestyle	1:35.28	h	Khahliso Caroline Mpeta	Lesotho	17 October 2009	World Cup	Durban, South Africa	
200 m freestyle								
400 m freestyle								
800 m freestyle								
1500 m freestyle								
50m backstroke	55.69	h	Khahliso Caroline Mpeta	Lesotho	16 October 2009	World Cup	Durban, South Africa	
100m backstroke								
200m backstroke								
50m breaststroke	50.94	h	Khahliso Caroline Mpeta	Lesotho	17 October 2009	World Cup	Durban, South Africa	
100 m breaststroke								
200 m breaststroke								
50m butterfly	46.64	h	Khahliso Caroline Mpeta	Lesotho	13 December 2012	World Championships	Istanbul, Turkey	
100 m butterfly								
200 m butterfly								
100 m individual medley								
200 m individual medley								
400 m individual medley								
4×50 m freestyle relay								
4×100 m freestyle relay								
4×200 m freestyle relay								
4×50 m medley relay								
4×100 m medley relay								

Legend: # – Record awaiting ratification by Lesotho Swimmers Association; WR – World record; AF – African record; e – equalled existing record;
Records not set in finals: h – heat; sf – semifinal; r – relay 1st leg; rh – relay heat 1st leg; b – B final; † – en route to final mark; so – swim-off; tt – time trial
