= Swimming at the 2010 Commonwealth Games – Men's 50 metre freestyle =

Men's 50 metre freestyle at the 2010 Commonwealth Games
- Venue: SPM Swimming Pool Complex
- Dates: 8 October (heats, semifinals); 9 October (final)
- Competitors: 66 from 31 nations
- Winning time: 22.01

Medalists
gold medal	Brent Hayden	Canada
silver medal	Roland Schoeman	South Africa
bronze medal	Gideon Louw	South Africa

The Men's 50 metre freestyle event at the 2010 Commonwealth Games took place on 8 and 9 October 2010, at the SPM Swimming Pool Complex.

Nine heats were held, with most containing the maximum number of swimmers (eight). The heat in which a swimmer competed did not formally matter for advancement, as the swimmers with the top sixteen times qualified for the semifinals and the swimmers with the top eight times from there qualified for the finals.

== Heats summary ==
Rank	Heat	Lane	Name	Nationality	Time	Notes
1	9	4	Brent Hayden	Canada	22.25	Q
2	9	5	Gideon Louw	South Africa	22.32	Q
3	9	3	Cameron Prosser	Australia	22.38	Q
4	8	5	Ashley Callus	Australia	22.46	Q
5	7	4	Roland Schoeman	South Africa	22.54	Q
6	8	4	Eamon Sullivan	Australia	22.65	Q
7	7	5	Simon Burnett	England	22.68	Q
8	7	3	Adam Brown	England	22.79	Q
9	8	6	David Dunford	Kenya	22.81	Q
10	8	3	Graeme Moore	South Africa	23.02	Q WD
11	7	6	Grant Turner	England	23.03	Q
12	9	1	Virdhawal Khade	India	23.05	Q
13	8	1	Richard Hortness	Canada	23.20	Q
14	8	7	Ryan Pini	Papua New Guinea	23.23	Q
15	9	7	Brett Fraser	Cayman Islands	23.34	Q
16	7	2	Roy-Allan Burch	Bermuda	23.35	Q
17	9	8	Jian Foo	Malaysia	23.73	Q
18	8	8	Joshua McLeod	Trinidad and Tobago	23.86	
19	6	8	Jak Scott	Scotland	23.96	
20	9	2	Lijie Richard Chng	Singapore	23.99	
21	6	6	Blake Worsley	Canada	24.17	
22	6	5	Caryle Blondell	Trinidad and Tobago	24.18	
23	7	8	Nick Thomson	Bermuda	24.22	
24	6	2	Arren Xin Hui Quek	Singapore	24.23	
25	6	4	Cadell Lyons	Trinidad and Tobago	24.30	
26	6	3	Conor Leaney	Northern Ireland	24.49	
27	5	6	Luke Hall	Swaziland	24.46	
28	5	2	Anshul Kothari	India	24.56	
29	5	7	Ramadhan Vyombo	Kenya	24.63	
30	2	2	Shakil Camal	Mozambique	24.67	
31	5	1	Arjun Jayaprakash	India	24.75	
32	6	1	Aaron Xian Ying Yeo	Singapore	24.92	
33	5	8	Mohammad Mahfizur Rahman	Bangladesh	24.97	
34	4	3	Ian Hubert	Guernsey	25.07	
35	2	7	Akmal Raea Gulab Khan	Samoa	25.29	
36	1	3	Kurtis Matthew Tulia	Samoa	25.34	
37	4	8	Peter Popahun Pokawin	Papua New Guinea	25.36	
38	4	7	Ben Lowndes	Guernsey	25.37	
39	4	5	Heshan Unamboowe	Sri Lanka	25.55	
40	4	2	Esau Simpson	Grenada	25.56	
41	5	4	Nicholas Charles Coard	Grenada	25.67	
42	4	4	Shane Mangroo	Seychelles	25.68	
42	4	1	Daniel Pryke	Papua New Guinea	25.68	
44	6	7	Amini Fonua	Tonga	25.96	
45	4	6	Jean Hugues Gregoire	Mauritius	26.10	
46	3	5	Mark Paul Thompson	Zambia	26.20	
47	3	4	Milimo Mweetwa	Zambia	26.34	
48	3	3	Ron Roucou	Seychelles	26.74	
49	3	6	Hilal Hemed Hilal	Tanzania	27.28	
50	2	4	Charlton Nyirenda	Malawi	27.62	
51	3	8	Ganzi Mugula	Uganda	27.74	
52	3	2	Inayath Hassan Hassan	Maldives	27.78	
53	2	3	Christopher Millar	Malawi	28.21	
54	2	5	Hassan Ashraf Hassan	Maldives	28.25	
55	3	1	Khalid Rushaka	Tanzania	28.39	
56	3	7	Daisuke Ssegwanyi	Uganda	28.60	
57	2	1	Boipelo Makhothi	Lesotho	32.50	
58	1	4	Khosi Mokhesi	Lesotho	33.43	
	1	5	Christopher Bennett Symonds	Ghana	DNS	
	5	3	Nikolas Aresti	Cyprus	DNS	
	5	5	Omiros Zagkas	Cyprus	DNS	
	7	1	Shaune Fraser	Cayman Islands	DNS	
	7	7	Alexandre Bakhtiarov	Cyprus	DNS	
	8	2	Ryan Harrison	Northern Ireland	DNS	
	9	6	Jason Dunford	Kenya	DNS	
	2	6	Izudhaadh Ahmed	Maldives	DSQ	

== Semifinals ==
=== Semifinal 1 ===
Rank	Lane	Name	Nationality	Time	Notes
1	4	Gideon Louw	South Africa	22.07	Q
2	3	Eamon Sullivan	Australia	22.36	Q
3	6	Adam Brown	England	22.75	Q
4	2	Grant Turner	England	22.78	
5	1	Brett Fraser	Cayman Islands	23.27	
6	7	Richard Hortness	Canada	23.33	
7	8	Jian Foo	Malaysia	23.72	
–	5	Ashley Callus	Australia		DSQ

=== Semifinal 2 ===
Rank	Lane	Name	Nationality	Time	Notes
1	4	Brent Hayden	Canada	22.18	Q
2	5	Cameron Prosser	Australia	22.28	Q
3	3	Roland Schoeman	South Africa	22.48	Q
4	2	David Dunford	Kenya	22.55	Q
5	6	Simon Burnett	England	22.66	Q
6	7	Virdhawal Khade	India	23.05	
7	8	Roy-Allan Burch	Bermuda	23.16	
7	1	Ryan Pini	Papua New Guinea	23.16	

== Final ==
Rank	Lane	Name	Nationality	Time	Notes
1st place, gold medalist(s)	5	Brent Hayden	Canada	22.01	CG
2nd place, silver medalist(s)	2	Roland Schoeman	South Africa	22.14	
3rd place, bronze medalist(s)	4	Gideon Louw	South Africa	22.22	
4	1	Simon Burnett	England	22.44	
5	3	Cameron Prosser	Australia	22.46	
6	6	Eamon Sullivan	Australia	22.51	
6	8	Adam Brown	England	22.51	
8	7	David Dunford	Kenya	22.64	
