= Cameron Prosser =

Australian swimmer

Personal information
- Full name: Cameron Colin Prosser
- Nationality: Australian
- Born: 7 March 1985 (age 41) Melbourne, Victoria, Australia

Sport
- Sport: Swimming
- Strokes: freestyle
- Club: Bond University Swimming Club
Medal record
Commonwealth Games
Gold medal – first place	2010 Delhi	4×100 m freestyle
Pan Pacific Championships
Silver medal – second place	2010 Irvine	4×100 m freestyle
Summer Universiade
Silver medal – second place	2009 Belgrade	100 m freestyle
Oceania Championships
Gold medal – first place	2006 Cairns	50 m freestyle
Gold medal – first place	2006 Cairns	100 m freestyle
Gold medal – first place	2006 Cairns	4×100 m freestyle
- Updated on 10 January 2014

Cameron Colin Prosser (born 7 March 1985) is an Australian freestyle swimmer.

== Career ==
Prosser was born in Melbourne, Victoria, and first competed for Australia at the 2006 Oceania Swimming Championships in Cairns where he won gold medals in the 50 and 100 metre freestyle events and with Kirk Palmer, Tim La Forest and Grant Brits won gold in the 4 × 100 metre freestyle relay, setting a new championship record in each event.

In 2009, at the 2009 Summer Universiade in Belgrade, Serbia, Prosser won silver in the 100 metre freestyle, finished in 5th in the 50 metre freestyle and with Tom Miller, Gene Kubala and Lloyd Townsing was disqualified in the 4 × 100 metre freestyle relay.

Earlier at the 2009 Australian Swimming Championships, Prosser alongside Townsing, Ryan Nolan and Justin Griggs set an Australian Championship record in the 4 × 100 metre freestyle relay with a 3:20.67. Prosser's anchor leg was swum in 48.99. Five months later, the same Melbourne Vicentre quartet set an Australian All Comers record in the same event at the 2009 Australian Short Course Swimming Championships.

His breakthrough was at the 2010 Australian Swimming Championships in Sydney where Prosser won the silver in the 50 metre freestyle behind Ashley Callus. This result qualified him for the 2010 Pan Pacific Swimming Championships and the 2010 Commonwealth Games. At the Pan Pacs, held in Irvine, California in August, Prosser finished 8th in the 50 metre freestyle and finished 9th in heats of the 100 metre freestyle. (Note: due to the fact that Prosser finished behind three other Australians, Kyle Richardson, Eamon Sullivan, and James Magnussen he was ineligible to contest the B final.) However, when Prosser teamed up with Richardson, Sullivan, and Magnussen they won silver in the 4 × 100 metre freestyle relay, finishing behind the United States.

At the Commonwealth Games in Delhi, Prosser finished 5th in 50 metre freestyle in 22.46 and when teamed up with Richardson, Magnussen and Tommaso D'Orsogna finished as the fastest qualifier for the final in the heats of the 4 × 100 metre freestyle relay in 3:15.18. Sullivan replaced Prosser and the team went on to win in the final in a Games record time of 3:13.92.
