= Swimming at the 2010 Commonwealth Games – Men's 100 metre freestyle =

Men's 100 metre freestyle at the 2010 Commonwealth Games
- Venue: SPM Swimming Pool Complex
- Dates: 6 October (heats, semifinals); 7 October (final)
- Competitors: 52 from 31 nations
- Winning time: 47.98

Medalists
gold medal	Brent Hayden	Canada
silver medal	Simon Burnett	England
bronze medal	Eamon Sullivan	Australia

The Men's 100 metre freestyle event at the 2010 Commonwealth Games took place on 6 and 7 October 2010, at the SPM Swimming Pool Complex.

Seven heats were held, with most containing the maximum number of swimmers (eight). The heat in which a swimmer competed did not formally matter for advancement, as the swimmers with the top sixteen times advanced to the semifinals and the top eight times from there qualified for the finals.

== Heats ==
The Heats started on 8:52 local time.

=== Heat 1 ===
Rank	Lane	Name	Nationality	Time	Notes
1	4	Shakil Camal	Mozambique	55.00	
2	5	Boipelo Makhothi	Lesotho	1:14.95	NR
3	3	Khosi Mokhesi	Lesotho	1:15.91	
–	6	Christopher Symonds	Ghana		DNS

=== Heat 2 ===
Rank	Lane	Name	Nationality	Time	Notes
1	4	Shane Mangroo	Seychelles	56.87	
2	3	Peter Pokawin	Papua New Guinea	56.97	
3	5	Daniel Pryke	Papua New Guinea	57.04	
4	2	Adam Viktora	Seychelles	58.31	
5	6	Mark Thompson	Zambia	1:00.02	
6	7	Inayath Hassan	Maldives	1:01.58	
7	8	Daisuke Ssegwanyi	Uganda	1:04.41	
–	1	Eliasu Abrama	Ghana		DNS

=== Heat 3 ===
Rank	Lane	Name	Nationality	Time	Notes
1	4	Dzulhaili Kamal	Singapore	52.97	
2	5	Luke Hall	Swaziland	53.35	
3	3	Ian Hubert	Guernsey	53.83	
4	8	Matthew Abeysinghe	Sri Lanka	54.40	
5	7	Suheil Harjani	Gibraltar	55.88	
6	6	Nicholas Coard	Grenada	56.32	
7	1	Esau Simpson	Grenada	56.83	
8	2	Jean Hugues Gregoire	Mauritius	56.94	

=== Heat 4 ===
Rank	Lane	Name	Nationality	Time	Notes
1	3	Joshua McLeod	Trinidad and Tobago	52.07	
2	2	Jarryd Gregoire	Trinidad and Tobago	52.08	
3	4	Caryle Blondell	Trinidad and Tobago	52.60	
4	6	Arren Quek	Singapore	52.70	
5	8	Zane Jordan	Zambia	53.01	
6	5	Richard Chng	Singapore	53.24	
7	1	Anshul Kothari	India	53.48	
8	7	Nick Thompson	Bermuda	54.36	

=== Heat 5 ===
Rank	Lane	Name	Nationality	Time	Notes
1	3	Grant Turner	England	49.87	Q
2	4	Kyle Richardson	Australia	49.93	Q
3	6	Shaune Fraser	Cayman Islands	49.93	Q
4	5	Simon Burnett	England	49.97	Q
5	8	Roy-Allan Burch	Bermuda	51.80	
6	1	Aaron Dsouza	India	52.46	
–	2	Andrew Bree	Northern Ireland		DNS
–	7	Ryan Harrison	Northern Ireland		DNS

=== Heat 6 ===
Rank	Lane	Name	Nationality	Time	Notes
1	5	Gideon Louw	South Africa	49.24	Q
2	4	Eamon Sullivan	Australia	49.79	Q
3	3	Tommaso D´orsogna	Australia	49.89	Q
4	2	Brett Fraser	Cayman Islands	50.21	Q
5	1	Virdhawal Khade	India	50.67	Q
6	6	Richard Hortness	Canada	50.85	Q
7	7	Alexandre Bakhtiarov	Cyprus	51.64	Q
8	8	Conor Leaney	Northern Ireland	52.92	

=== Heat 7 ===
Rank	Lane	Name	Nationality	Time	Notes
1	4	Brent Hayden	Canada	49.79	Q
2	6	Adam Brown	England	49.88	Q
3	5	Graeme Moore	South Africa	49.96	Q
4	3	David Dunford	Kenya	50.44	Q
5	2	Ryan Pini	Papua New Guinea	51.28	
6	8	Ieuan Lloyd	Wales	51.44	Q
7	7	Blake Worsley	Canada	51.70	
8	1	Foo Jian Beng	Malaysia	51.95	

== Semifinals ==
=== Semifinal 1 ===
Rank	Lane	Name	Nationality	Time	Notes
1	4	Eamon Sullivan	Australia	48.66	Q
2	2	Simon Burnett	England	49.40	Q
3	3	Tommaso D´orsogna	Australia	49.52	Q
4	5	Grant Turner	England	49.92	
5	7	David Dunford	Kenya	50.10	
6	6	Shaune Fraser	Cayman Islands	50.15	
7	1	Richard Hortness	Canada	50.91	
–	8	Alexandre Bakhtiarov	Cyprus		DNS

=== Semifinal 2 ===
Rank	Lane	Name	Nationality	Time	Notes
1	5	Brent Hayden	Canada	48.74	Q
2	4	Gideon Louw	South Africa	49.28	Q
3	2	Graeme Moore	South Africa	49.53	Q
4	6	Kyle Richardson	Australia	49.60	Q
5	3	Adam Brown	England	49.65	Q
6	1	Virdhawal Khade	India	50.10	
7	7	Brett Fraser	Cayman Islands	50.34	
8	8	Ieuan Lloyd	Wales	51.05	

== Final ==
Rank	Lane	Name	Nationality	Time	Notes
1st place, gold medalist(s)	5	Brent Hayden	Canada	47.98	CGR
2nd place, silver medalist(s)	6	Simon Burnett	England	48.54	
3rd place, bronze medalist(s)	4	Eamon Sullivan	Australia	48.69	
4	3	Gideon Louw	South Africa	49.21	
5	1	Kyle Richardson	Australia	49.26	
6	2	Tommaso D´orsogna	Australia	49.40	
7	7	Graeme Moore	South Africa	49.64	
8	8	Adam Brown	England	49.82	

== See also ==
- 2010 Commonwealth Games
- Swimming at the 2010 Commonwealth Games
