= Swimming at the 2007 World Aquatics Championships – Men's 50 metre backstroke =

Men's 50 metre backstroke at the 2007 FINA World Championships
- Venue: Rod Laver Arena
- Dates: 31 March 2007 (heats, semifinals); 1 April 2007 (final)
- Competitors: 107
- Winning time: 24.98 seconds

Medalists
gold medal	Gerhard Zandberg	South Africa
silver medal	Thomas Rupprath	Germany
bronze medal	Liam Tancock	Great Britain

The men's 50 metre backstroke at the 2007 World Aquatics Championships took place on 31 March (prelims and semifinals ) and on the evening of 1 April (final) at Rod Laver Arena in Melbourne, Australia. 107 swimmers were entered in the event, of which 98 swam.

Existing records at the start of the event were:

- World record (WR): 24.80, Thomas Rupprath (Germany), 27 July 2003 in Barcelona, Spain.
- Championship record (CR): same

== Results ==
=== Final ===
Place	Lane	Name	Nationality	Time	Notes
	3	Gerhard Zandberg	South Africa	24.98	
	6	Thomas Rupprath	Germany	25.20	
	4	Liam Tancock	Great Britain	25.23	
4	5	Steffen Driesen	Germany	25.29	
5	2	Matthew Clay	Great Britain	25.32	
6	1	Aristeidis Grigoriadis	Greece	25.52	
7	7	Junya Koga	Japan	25.56	
8	8	Matt Welsh	Australia	25.61	

=== Semifinals ===
Rank	Heat & Lane	Name	Nationality	Time	Notes
1	H2-L3	Liam Tancock	Great Britain	25.08	Q
2	H2-L5	Steffen Driesen	Germany	25.21	Q
3	H1-L4	Gerhard Zandberg	South Africa	25.26	Q
4	H2-L4	Thomas Rupprath	Germany	25.29	Q
5	H1-L5	Matthew Clay	Great Britain	25.48	Q
6	H2-L6	Junya Koga	Japan	25.55	Q
7	H1-L3	Aristeidis Grigoriadis	Greece	25.66	Q
8	H1-L6	Matt Welsh	Australia	25.76	Q
9	H2-L1	Flori Lang	Switzerland	25.81	
10	H2-L2	Tomomi Morita	Japan	25.93	
11	H1-L2	Ľuboš Križko	Slovakia	25.96	
12	H2-L7	Arkady Vyatchanin	Russia	26.03	
13	H2-L8	David Ortega Pitarch	Spain	26.26	
14	H1-L8	ZHANG Chang	China	26.33	
15	H1-L1	Guy Barnea	Israel	26.45	
	H1-L7	Ouyang Kunpeng	China	DQ	

=== Heats ===
Rank	Heat	Lane	Name	Nationality	Time	Notes
1	12	3	Thomas Rupprath	Germany	25.25	Q
2	13	6	Gerhard Zandberg	South Africa	25.47	Q
3	13	5	Steffen Driesen	Germany	25.52	Q
4	13	4	Matthew Clay	Great Britain	25.66	Q
5	12	7	Ryan Lochte	USA	25.68	Q (scratched semis)
5	14	4	Liam Tancock	Great Britain	25.68	Q
7	12	4	Aristeidis Grigoriadis	Greece	25.74	Q
8	14	3	Junya Koga	Japan	25.88	Q
9	14	5	Matt Welsh	Australia	25.93	Q
10	14	8	Aaron Peirsol	USA	25.96	Q (scratched semis)
11	13	3	Tomomi Morita	Japan	25.98	Q
12	13	2	Ľuboš Križko	Slovakia	26.03	Q
13	14	6	Arkady Vyatchanin	Russia	26.14	Q
14	12	5	OUYANG Kunpeng	China	26.20	Q
15	12	2	Flori Lang	Switzerland	26.23	Q
16	13	8	Guy Barnea	Israel	26.24	Q
17	12	6	David Ortega Pitarch	Spain	26.26	
18	10	7	Vytautas Janušaitis	Lithuania	26.34	(scratched semis)
18	11	4	ZHANG Chang	China	26.34	
20	11	5	Eduardo German Otero	Argentina	26.37	
21	14	7	Hayden Stoeckel	Australia	26.38	
22	13	1	Ivan Tolic	Croatia	26.42	
22	14	1	Andriy Oleynyk	Ukraine	26.42	
24	11	7	Garth Tune	South Africa	26.49	
25	13	7	Simon Dufour	France	26.58	
26	10	1	Itai Chammah	Israel	26.67	
27	11	2	Ioannis Kokkodis	Greece	26.69	
28	12	8	Derya Büyükuncu	Turkey	26.71	
28	14	2	Matthew Rose	Canada	26.71	
30	10	5	Pavel Sankovich	Belarus	26.81	
31	10	3	Kim Torry Simmenes	Norway	26.89	
31	11	3	Leonardo Guedes	Brazil	26.89	
33	12	1	Ante Cvitkovic	Croatia	26.94	
34	11	8	Danil Bugakov	Uzbekistan	26.97	
35	10	6	Stanislav Osinsky	Kazakhstan	26.98	
36	11	6	Gabriel Mangabeira	Brazil	27.07	
37	11	1	Mathias Stenderup Gydesen	Denmark	27.37	
38	9	4	Seunghyeon Lee	South Korea	27.44	
39	9	7	Yu An Lin	Chinese Taipei	27.69	
40	9	6	Giorgios Mylonas	Cyprus	27.71	
41	1	5	Romāns Miloslavskis	Latvia	27.74	
42	9	3	Geoffrey Robin Cheah	Hong Kong	27.81	
43	10	8	David Dunford	Kenya	27.93	
44	9	5	Rony Bakale	Congo	27.96	
45	7	2	Andy Wibowo	Indonesia	27.97	
46	7	4	Felix Cristiadi Sutanto	Indonesia	27.98	
47	7	3	Miguel Robles	Mexico	28.00	
48	8	5	Suriya Suksuphak	Thailand	28.05	
49	8	4	Jared Heine	Marshall Islands	28.24	
50	9	1	Taki Mrabet	Tunisia	28.41	
51	8	2	Sandeep Nagar Anthal	India	28.50	
52	9	8	Arjun Muralidharan	India	28.62	
53	2	1	Roy-Allan Saul Burch Burch	Bermuda	28.67	
54	7	7	Zhi Cong Lim	Singapore	28.75	
54	8	7	Shahin Baradaran Nakhjavani	Iran	28.75	
54	9	2	Amine Kouam	Morocco	28.75	
57	6	2	Jorge Arturo Arce Aita	Costa Rica	28.81	
58	8	3	Iurii Zakharov	Kyrgyzstan	28.85	
59	7	8	Mario Montoya	Costa Rica	28.89	
60	6	4	Wen Hao Joshua Lim	Singapore	28.95	
61	7	5	Gael Adam	Mauritius	29.13	
62	7	6	Yassir Abalalla	Bolivia	29.16	
63	8	6	Obaid Al-Jasmi	United Arab Emirates	29.19	
63	8	1	Onan Thom	Guyana	29.19	
65	6	8	Adonis Ganiev	Uzbekistan	29.22	
66	2	8	Eric Chang	Malaysia	29.28	
67	5	7	Khaly Ciss	Senegal	29.36	
68	6	5	Heshan Unamboowe	Sri Lanka	29.40	
69	5	6	Sohaib Kalali	Syria	29.49	
70	5	8	Rainui Terupaia	Tahiti	29.50	
71	6	1	Jonathan Calderon	Saint Lucia	29.70	
72	5	5	Hong Nam Lei	Macau	29.72	
73	6	3	Erik Rajohnson	Madagascar	29.92	
74	6	7	Tural Abbasov	Azerbaijan	30.47	
75	5	2	Kin Wa Cheong	Macau	30.70	
76	5	3	Jamie Zammitt	Gibraltar	30.72	
77	4	6	Fadi Awesat	Palestine	30.84	
78	4	4	Kerson Hadley	Federated States of Micronesia	30.89	
79	3	4	Tony Augustine	Federated States of Micronesia	30.91	
80	4	5	Zane Jordan	Zambia	31.21	
81	4	8	Hernan Bonsembiante	Guam	31.42	
82	5	1	Richard Randrianandraina	Madagascar	31.60	
83	4	3	Jamaal Sobers	Guyana	32.08	
84	3	7	Justin Decoster	Marshall Islands	32.94	
85	4	2	Sami Nassar	Palestine	33.46	
86	3	1	Isao Misech	Palau	33.54	
87	3	5	Monder Al−Jabali	Libya	33.82	
88	3	2	Rahim Karmali	Uganda	34.28	
89	3	8	Ali Zayeri	Brunei	34.82	
90	2	4	Ibrahim Shameel	Maldives	36.34	
91	2	6	Bulguitei Buyankhishig	Mongolia	36.65	
92	1	3	Herve Nkurrnziza	Burundi	36.86	
93	4	7	Kevin Cheung	Mauritius	36.96	
94	2	2	Ching Maou Wei	American Samoa	38.65	
95	2	5	Mohammed Al Qerbi	Yemen	38.75	
96	1	4	Boipelo Makhothi	Lesotho	40.72	NR
97	2	7	Thabiso Baholo	Lesotho	43.67	
	2	3	Jules Yao Bessan	Benin	DQ	
	3	3	Carlos Shimizu	Guam	DNS	
	3	6	Ashraf Ahmed	Sudan	DNS	
	4	1	Marbi Hani	Albania	DNS	
	5	4	João Aguiar	Angola	DNS	
	6	6	Samson Opuakpo	Nigeria	DNS	
	7	1	Mohammad Rubel	Bangladesh	DNS	
	8	8	Essossimana Awizoba	Togo	DNS	
	10	2	Jason Dunford	Kenya	DNS	
	10	4	Markus Rogan	Austria	DNS	

== See also ==
- Swimming at the 2005 World Aquatics Championships – Men's 50 metre backstroke (previous Worlds)
- Swimming at the 2009 World Aquatics Championships – Men's 50 metre backstroke (next Worlds)
