= 2010 Pan Pacific Swimming Championships – Men's 4 × 100 metre freestyle relay =

Men's 4 × 100 metre freestyle relay at the 2010 Pan Pacific Swimming Championships
- Venue: William Woollett Jr. Aquatics Center
- Dates: August 20, 2010 (heats & finals)
- Winning time: 3:11.74

Medalists
gold medal	Michael Phelps, Ryan Lochte, Jason Lezak and Nathan Adrian	United States
silver medal	Eamon Sullivan, Kyle Richardson, Cameron Prosser and James Magnussen	Australia
bronze medal	Lyndon Ferns, Gideon Louw, Roland Schoeman and Graeme Moore	South Africa

The men's 4 × 100 metre freestyle relay competition at the 2010 Pan Pacific Swimming Championships took place on August 20 at the William Woollett Jr. Aquatics Center. The last champion was the United States.

This race consisted of eight lengths of the pool. Each of the four swimmers completed two lengths of the pool. The first swimmer had to touch the wall before the second could leave the starting block.

== Records ==
Prior to this competition, the existing world and Pan Pacific records were as follows:

World record	United States (USA); Michael Phelps (47.51); Garrett Weber-Gale (47.02); Cullen Jones (47.65); Jason Lezak (46.06)	3:08.24	Beijing, China	August 11, 2008
Pan Pacific Championships record	United States (USA); Michael Phelps (48.83); Neil Walker (47.89); Cullen Jones (47.96); Jason Lezak (47.78)	3:12.46	Victoria, Canada	August 19, 2006

== Results ==
All times are in minutes and seconds.

KEY:	q	Fastest non-qualifiers	Q	Qualified	CR	Championships record	NR	National record	PB	Personal best	SB	Seasonal best

=== Heats ===
Heats weren't performed, as only six teams had entered.

=== Final ===
The final was held on August 20, at 20:18.

Rank	Lane	Name	Nationality	Time	Notes
1st place, gold medalist(s)	4	Michael Phelps (48.13 CR); Ryan Lochte (47.98); Jason Lezak (48.12); Nathan Adrian (47.51)	United States	3:11.74	CR
2nd place, silver medalist(s)	5	Eamon Sullivan (49.19); Kyle Richardson (48.48); Cameron Prosser (48.38); James Magnussen (48.25)	Australia	3:14.30	
3rd place, bronze medalist(s)	3	Lyndon Ferns (49.19); Gideon Louw (48.40); Roland Schoeman (49.95); Graeme Moore (48.39)	South Africa	3:15.93	
4	2	Brent Hayden (48.18); Colin Russell (48.82); Richard Hortness (49.75); Luke Peddie (49.78)	Canada	3:16.53	
5	6	Takuro Fujii (49.20); Sho Uchida (49.35); Rammaru Harada (49.26); Shunsuke Kuzuhara (49.68)	Japan	3:17.49	
6	7	Jeong Doo-Hee (52.10); Park Minkyu (50.56); Park Seon-Kwan (51.03); Bae Joonmo (50.84)	South Korea	3:24.53	
