= Swimming at the 2010 Commonwealth Games – Men's 100 metre breaststroke =

Men's 100 metre Breaststroke at the 2010 Commonwealth Games
- Venue: SPM Swimming Pool Complex
- Dates: 5 October (heats, semifinals); 6 October (final)
- Competitors: 30 from 19 nations
- Winning time: 1:00.10

Medalists
| gold medal | Cameron van der Burgh | South Africa |
| silver medal | Christian Sprenger | Australia |
| bronze medal | Brenton Rickard | Australia |

The Men's 100 metre breaststroke event at the 2010 Commonwealth Games took place on October 5 and 6, 2010, at the SPM Swimming Pool Complex.

Four heats were held, with most containing the maximum number of swimmers (eight). The heat in which a swimmer competed did not formally matter for advancement, as the swimmers with the top sixteen times advanced to the semifinals and the top eight times from there qualified for the finals.

== Heats ==
=== Heat 1 ===
| Rank | Lane | Name | Nationality | Time | Notes |
|---|---|---|---|---|---|
| 1 | 7 | Puneet Rana | India | 01:05.97 | |
| 2 | 4 | Ron Roucou | Seychelles | 01:18.50 | |
| 3 | 3 | Daisuke Ssegwanyi | Uganda | 01:20.28 | |
| 4 | 5 | Ganzi Mugula | Uganda | 01:22.97 | |
| 5 | 6 | Khosi Mokhesi | Lesotho | 01:37.73 | |
| 6 | 2 | Boipelo Makhothi | Lesotho | 01:39.60 | |

=== Heat 2 ===
| Rank | Lane | Name | Nationality | Time | Notes |
|---|---|---|---|---|---|
| 1 | 4 | Glenn Snyders | New Zealand | 01:01.30 | Q |
| 2 | 5 | Kristopher Gilchrist | Scotland | 01:01.87 | Q |
| 3 | 6 | Robert Holderness | Wales | 01:01.90 | Q |
| 4 | 3 | Richard Webb | England | 01:02.89 | Q |
| 5 | 2 | Michael Dawson | Northern Ireland | 01:03.80 | Q |
| 6 | 7 | Ian Black | Jersey | 01:05.22 | |
| 7 | 1 | Raymond Edwards | Barbados | 01:09.33 | |
| 8 | 8 | Hassan Hassan | Maldives | 01:18.65 | |

=== Heat 3 ===
| Rank | Lane | Name | Nationality | Time | Notes |
|---|---|---|---|---|---|
| 1 | 4 | Brenton Rickard | Australia | 01:01.91 | Q |
| 2 | 5 | Cameron van der Burgh | South Africa | 01:02.13 | Q |
| 3 | 3 | Daniel Sliwinski | England | 01:03.20 | Q |
| 4 | 6 | Craig Calder | Australia | 01:03.47 | Q |
| 5 | 2 | Amini Fonua | Tonga | 01:04.02 | Q |
| 6 | 7 | See Yap | Malaysia | 01:04.87 | |
| 7 | 1 | Amar Shah | Kenya | 01:08.73 | |
| 8 | 8 | Izudhaadh Ahmed | Maldives | 01:30.09 | |

=== Heat 4 ===
| Rank | Lane | Name | Nationality | Time | Notes |
|---|---|---|---|---|---|
| 1 | 4 | Christian Sprenger | Australia | 01:00.61 | Q, CGR |
| 2 | 3 | Michael Jamieson | Scotland | 01:01.53 | Q |
| 3 | 5 | Scott Dickens | Canada | 01:02.47 | Q |
| 4 | 7 | Sandeep Sejwal | India | 01:02.72 | Q |
| 5 | 6 | Andrew Willis | England | 01:02.87 | Q |
| 6 | 2 | Andrew Bree | Northern Ireland | 01:03.09 | Q |
| 7 | 1 | Agnishwar Jayaprakash | India | 01:06.28 | |
| 8 | 8 | Adam Ampa´Oi | Papua New Guinea | 01:15.83 | |

== Semifinals ==
=== Semifinal 1 ===
| Rank | Lane | Name | Nationality | Time | Notes |
|---|---|---|---|---|---|
| 1 | 4 | Glenn Snyders | New Zealand | 01:00.55 | Q, CGR |
| 2 | 6 | Scott Dickens | Canada | 01:01.22 | Q |
| 3 | 5 | Kristopher Gilchrist | Scotland | 01:01.38 | Q |
| 4 | 3 | Brenton Rickard | Australia | 01:01.39 | Q |
| 5 | 2 | Andrew Willis | England | 01:01.84 | |
| 6 | 7 | Andrew Bree | Northern Ireland | 01:02.91 | |
| 7 | 1 | Craig Calder | Australia | 01:03.60 | |
| 8 | 8 | Amini Fonua | Tonga | 01:04.44 | |

=== Semifinal 2 ===
| Rank | Lane | Name | Nationality | Time | Notes |
|---|---|---|---|---|---|
| 1 | 4 | Christian Sprenger | Australia | 01:00.45 | Q, CGR |
| 2 | 6 | Cameron van der Burgh | South Africa | 01:00.52 | Q |
| 3 | 5 | Michael Jamieson | Scotland | 01:00.64 | Q |
| 4 | 1 | Daniel Sliwinski | England | 01:01.60 | Q |
| 5 | 3 | Robert Holderness | Wales | 01:01.64 | |
| 6 | 7 | Richard Webb | England | 01:01.84 | |
| 7 | 2 | Sandeep Sejwal | India | 01:03.13 | |
| 8 | 8 | Michael Dawson | Northern Ireland | 01:04.49 | |

== Final ==
| Rank | Lane | Name | Nationality | Time | Notes |
|---|---|---|---|---|---|
| 1st place, gold medalist(s) | 5 | Cameron van der Burgh | South Africa | 1:00.10 | CG |
| 2nd place, silver medalist(s) | 4 | Christian Sprenger | Australia | 1:00.29 | |
| 3rd place, bronze medalist(s) | 1 | Brenton Rickard | Australia | 1:00.46 | |
| 4 | 6 | Michael Jamieson | Scotland | 1:00.60 | |
| 5 | 2 | Scott Dickens | Canada | 1:00.98 | |
| 6 | 3 | Glenn Snyders | New Zealand | 1:01.39 | |
| 7 | 7 | Kristopher Gilchrist | Scotland | 1:01.43 | |
| 8 | 8 | Daniel Sliwinski | England | 1:01.68 | |
