= Swimming at the 2010 Commonwealth Games – Men's 4 × 100 metre medley relay =

The Men's 4 × 100 metre medley relay event at the 2010 Commonwealth Games took place on 9 October 2010, at the SPM Swimming Pool Complex.

Two heats were held, with containing nine countries. The heat in which a country competed in did not formally matter for advancement, as the countries with the top eight times from the entire field qualified for the finals.

== Heats ==
=== Heat 1 ===
Rank	Lane	Names	Time	Notes
1	2	South Africa; Charl Crous (56.22); Cameron van der Burgh (1:03.65); Sebastien Rousseau (54.43); Jean Basson (51.00)	3:45.30	Q
2	4	Canada; Tobias Oriwol (58.21); Robert Ford (1:06.48); Stefan Hirniak (55.29); Richard Hortness (49.91)	3:49.89	Q
3	3	Malaysia; I. Barr (58.21); See Yap (1:05.03); Daniel Bego (55.37); Foo Jian Beng (53.28)	3:51.89	Q
4	5	Guernsey; Xander Beaton (1:01.74); Thomas Hollingsworth (1:04.81); Ian Powell (55.01); Ian Hubert (53.22)	3:54.78	Q
5	6	Papua New Guinea; Peter Pokawin (1:07.27); Adam Ampa´Oi (1:15.79); Ryan Pini (55.33); Daniel Pryke (56.94)	4:15.33	

=== Heat 2 ===
Rank	Lane	Names	Time	Notes
1	4	Australia; Ashley Delaney (56.15); Christian Sprenger (1:02.15); Geoffrey Huegill (54.69); Kyle Richardson (48.92)	3:41.91	Q
2	5	England; Christopher Walker-Hebborn (55.85); Daniel Sliwinski (1:03.05); Antony James (55.43); Adam Brown (50.31)	3:44.64	Q
3	2	Scotland; Craig McNally (57.22); Lewis Smith (1:04.48); Cameron Brodie (55.77); Andrew Hunter (51.38)	3:48.85	Q
4	3	India; B. Melkote (59.63); Sandeep Sejwal (1:02.42); Virdhawal Khade (57.24); Aaron Dsouza (50.20)	3:54.78	Q
5	6	Northern Ireland		DNS

== Final ==
Rank	Lane	Names	Time	Notes
1st place, gold medalist(s)	4	Australia; Ashley Delaney (54.41); Brenton Rickard (59.59); Geoffrey Huegill (51.34); Eamon Sullivan (47.81)	3:33.15	CG
2nd place, silver medalist(s)	3	South Africa; Charl Crous (55.89); Cameron van der Burgh (59.60); Chad le Clos (52.98); Gideon Louw (47.65)	3:36.12	
3rd place, bronze medalist(s)	5	England; Liam Tancock (53.66); Daniel Sliwinski (1:02.27); Antony James (52.34); Simon Burnett (48.04)	3:36.31	
4	7	Canada; Tobias Oriwol (56.01); Scott Dickens (1:00.33); Stefan Hirniak (53.82); Brent Hayden (47.45)	3:37.61	
5	6	Scotland; Craig McNally (56.28); Michael Jamieson (1:00.27); Andrew Mayor (53.86); Andrew Hunter (50.27)	3:40.68	
6	2	India; B. Melkote (58.77); Sandeep Sejwal (1:02.03); Virdhawal Khade (54.36); Aaron Dsouza (52.07)	3:47.23	
7	1	Malaysia; I. Barr (58.28); See Yap (1:04.36); Daniel Bego (54.70); Foo Jian Beng (51.36)	3:48.70	
8	8	Guernsey; Xander Beaton (1:01.63); Thomas Hollingsworth (1:05.06); Ian Powell (55.10); Ian Hubert (53.37)	3:55.16	
