= 2006 Oceania Swimming Championships =

The 2006 Oceania Swimming Championships took place from 7–16 July at 3 locations in Queensland, Australia. This was the sixth edition of the Championships, and featured competitions in:

- swimming—7, 8, 10 + 12 July at Trinity Anglican School in Cairns;
- open water swimming—9 + 12 July at Palm Cove Beach;
- synchronized swimming (synchro) -- 14–16 July at Chandler Pool in Brisbane.

All swimming competition listed below were swum in a 50m (long-course) pool.

== Participating countries ==
- Australia
- Fiji
- Hawaii
- New Caledonia
- New Zealand
- Palau
- Papua New Guinea
- Samoa
- Tahiti

== Event schedule ==
The swimming and open water schedules are below. Synchronized swimming was held 14–16 July.

Date	Friday; 7 July	Saturday; 8 July	Sunday; 9 July	Monday; 10 July	Tuesday; 11 July	Wednesday; 12 July
S w i m m i n g *	50 back (m) semis 50 breast (w) semis 200 free (m); 100 free (w) semis 100 fly (m) semis 200 fly (w); 100 breast (m) semis 400 IM (m); 400 IM (w); 100 back (w) semis 50 back (m); 50 breast (w); 400 free relay (m); 800 free relay (w)	50 free (m) semis 50 fly (w) semis 100 fly (m); 100 free (w); 100 breast (m); 200 breast (w); 400 free (m); 100 back (w); 200 back (m); 50 fly (w); 50 free (m); 800 free (w); 800 free relay (m)		50 back (w) semis 50 breast (m) semis 100 breast (w) semis 100 back (m) semis 400 free (w); 100 free (m) semis 100 fly (w) semis 200 fly (m); 50 back (w); 50 breast (m); 400 free relay (w)	50 free (w) semis 50 fly (m) semis 200 IM (w); 200 breast (m); 200 free (w); 100 free (m); 100 breast (w); 100 back (m); 100 fly (w); 200 IM (m); 200 back (w); 50 fly (m); 50 free (w); 1500 free (m); 400 medley relay (w); 400 medley relay (m)	
Open; Water			5K			10K

^{*}Finals-order shown for swimming. Prelims/semifinals/finals were swum in the 50s and 100; prelims/finals were swum in the 200s and 400s; and the women's 800 and men's 1500 were timed finals (i.e. each swimmer swims once; fastest heat swims at night). Morning session (prelims) began at 9:30 a.m.; evening session (semifinals & finals) began at 6:30 p.m.

== Results ==
=== Swimming ===
==== Men ====
Event	Gold		Silver		Bronze	
50m Freestyle	Cameron Prosser; Australia	23.12 CR	Tim La Forest; Australia	23.65	Mark Herring; New Zealand	23.71
100m Freestyle	Cameron Prosser; Australia	50.70 CR	Tim La Forest; Australia	51.43	Kirk Palmer; Australia	51.44
200m Freestyle	Grant Brits; Australia	1:51.22 CR	Robert Voss; New Zealand	1:51.78	Kirk Palmer; Australia	1:53.02
400m Freestyle	Nic Donald; Australia	3:55.58 CR	Robert Voss; New Zealand	3:59.44	Grant Brits; Australia	4:00.97
1500m Freestyle	Bryn Murphy; New Zealand	15:43.17	Daniel Ryan; New Zealand	16:00.10	Shane Patience; New Zealand	16:09.60
50m Backstroke	Ashley Delaney; Australia	26.47 CR	Lewis Williams; New Zealand	26.68	Grant Brits; Australia	26.69
100m Backstroke	Ashley Delaney; Australia	55.82 CR	Grant Brits; Australia	57.78	Kurt Bassett; New Zealand	58.07
200m Backstroke	Ashley Delaney; Australia	2:03.91	Kurt Bassett; New Zealand	2:04.75	Dean Kent; New Zealand	2:05.60
50m Breaststroke	Glenn Snyders; New Zealand	28.99	Kieran O'Regan; Australia	29.16	Adrien Thomas; New Caledonia	29.89
100m Breaststroke	Glenn Snyders; New Zealand	1:03.50	Kieran O'Regan; Australia	1:04.04	Adrien Thomas; New Caledonia	1:06.15
200m Breaststroke	Kieran O'Regan; Australia	2:17.95	Dean Kent; New Zealand	2:19.65	Glenn Snyders; New Zealand	2:20.95
50m Butterfly	Corney Swanepoel; New Zealand	24.33	Kirk Palmer; Australia	24.54	Matthew Thomas; New Zealand	24.83
100m Butterfly	Corney Swanepoel; New Zealand	54.51	Tim Dodd; Australia	55.21	Matthew Thomas; New Zealand	55.38
200m Butterfly	Nick Cordner; Australia	2:00.69	Nick D'Arcy; Australia	2:00.98	Nic Donald; Australia	2:01.81
200m I.M.	Stephen Parkes; Australia	2:03.43 CR	Dean Kent; New Zealand	2:06.18	Nick Cordner; Australia	2:06.91
400m I.M.	Dean Kent; New Zealand	4:25.31	Stephen Parkes; Australia	4:26.26	Nick Cordner; Australia	4:29.37
400m Free Relay	Australia; Kirk Palmer, Cameron Prosser, Tim La Forest, Grant Brits	3:23.60 CR	New Zealand; Robert Voss, Mark Herring, Hamish Wilson, Michael Jack	3:27.94	New Caledonia; David Thevenot, Gilles Dumesnil, Nicolas Hezard, Olivier Saminadin	3:31.65
800m Free Relay	Australia; Kirk Palmer, Nick D'Arcy, Josh Minogue, Grant Brits	7:31.64	New Zealand; Robert Voss, Ben Pickersgill-Brown, Kurt Bassett, Dean Kent	7:43.78	New Caledonia; Thomas Dahlia, Benoit Riviere, Olivier Saminadin, David Thevenot	8:09.68
400m Medley Relay	Australia; Ashley Delaney, Kieran O'Regan, Tim Dodd, Tim La Forest	3:45.24	New Zealand; John Zulch, Glenn Snyders, Corney Swanepoel, Robert Voss	3:46.31	New Caledonia; Nicolas Hezard, Adrien Thomas, Olivier Saminadin, David Thevenot	4:02.05

==== Women ====
Event	Gold		Silver		Bronze	
50m Freestyle	Ellese Zalewski; Australia	26.13	Elizabeth Coster; New Zealand	26.63	Lauren Boyle; New Zealand	26.76
100m Freestyle	Lauren Boyle; New Zealand	57.14	Amelia Evatt-Davey; Australia	57.65	Siobhan Keane; Australia	58.02
200m Freestyle	Ellese Zalewski; Australia	2:00.51 CR	Amelia Evatt-Davey; Australia	2:01.79	Lauren Boyle; New Zealand	2:01.92
400m Freestyle	Stephanie Williams; Australia	4:14.35	Lorren Sellwood; Australia	4:15.34	Lauren Boyle; New Zealand	4:19.20
800m Freestyle	Stephanie Williams; Australia	8:42.25	Lorren Sellwood; Australia	8:42.27	Lauren Boyle; New Zealand	8:53.74
50m Backstroke	Elizabeth Coster; New Zealand	29.57 CR	Meagan Nay; Australia	29.72	Jessie Blundell; New Zealand	30.39
100m Backstroke	Elizabeth Coster; New Zealand	1:02.79 CR	Meagan Nay; Australia	1:03.75	Kelly Newcombe; New Zealand	1:04.85
200m Backstroke	Meagan Nay; Australia	2:13.99 CR	Siobhan Keane; Australia	2:15.15	Jessie Blundell; New Zealand	2:18.76
50m Breaststroke	Katie Bird; Australia	32.84	Sarah Vettoretti; New Zealand	33.28	Katie Bone; New Zealand	33.79
100m Breaststroke	Katie Bird; Australia	1:12.37	Talia Goddard; Australia	1:12.56	Sarah Vettoretti; New Zealand	1:12.88
200m Breaststroke	Talia Goddard; Australia	2:34.35	Kelly Bentley; New Zealand	2:35.23	Brittany Beauchan; Hawaii	2:40.94
50m Butterfly	Ellese Zalewski; Australia	26.92 CR	Elizabeth Coster; New Zealand	28.07	Samantha Hamill; Australia	28.14
100m Butterfly	Ellese Zalewski; Australia	1:00.60 CR	Amy Smith; Australia	1:01.55	Samantha Hamill; Australia	1:01.64
200m Butterfly	Samantha Hamill; Australia	2:11.91 CR	Ellese Zalewski; Australia	2:13.13	Amy Smith; Australia	2:14.09
200m I.M.	Talia Goddard; Australia	2:18.00	Samantha Hamill; Australia	2:19.53	Katie Bird; Australia	2:19.66
400m I.M.	Talia Goddard; Australia	4:52.21	Kristen Wilson; Australia	4:56.80	Kelly Bentley; New Zealand	5:02.10
400m Free Relay	Australia; Ellese Zalewski, CR; Meagan Nay, Siobhan Keane, Amelia Evatt-Davey	3:47.16 CR	New Zealand; Lauren Boyle, Joyce Wiegersma, Penelope Marshall, Isabella Franks	3:57.61	New Caledonia; Armelle Hidrio, Anais Rians, Lara Grangeon, Adeline Williams	4:15.62
800m Free Relay	Australia; Meagan Nay, Stephanie Williams, Ellese Zalewski, Amelia Evatt-Davey	8:12.28 CR	New Zealand; Lauren Boyle, Joyce Wiegersma, Kirsten Cameron, Penelope Marshall	8:34.12	New Caledonia; Anais Rians, Armelle Hidrio, Adeline Williams, Lara Grangeon	9:17.39
400m Medley Relay	Australia; Meagan Nay, Katie Bird, Samantha Hamill, Ellese Zalewski	4:14.98	New Zealand; Elizabeth Coster, Sarah Vettoretti, Meagan Allan, Lauren Boyle	4:18.07	New Caledonia; Lara Grangeon, Adeline Williams, Armelle Hidrio, Anais Rians	4:49.89

=== Open Water medalist ===
Event	Gold		Silver		Bronze	
Men's 5K	James David; Australia	1:01:09.00	Olivier Saminadin; New Caledonia	1:01:29.00	Kieran Carrigan; Australia	1:01:42.00
Men's 10K	Kane Radford; New Zealand	2:07:54.00	James David; Australia	2:08:03.00	Kieran Carrigan; Australia	2:09:54.00
Women's 5K	Brooke Fletcher; Australia	1:03:00.00	Nikita Barsby; Australia	1:08:33.00	Kirsten Cameron; New Zealand	1:09:09.00
Women's 10K	Brooke Fletcher; Australia	2:11:16.00	Nikita Barsby; Australia	2:24:34.00	Kirsten Cameron; New Zealand	2:26:17.00

=== Synchro medalists ===
Event	Gold	Silver	Bronze
Open—Solo			
Open—Duet			
Junior—Solo			
Junior—Duet			
13, 14 & 15 yrs -- Solo			
13, 14 & 15 yrs -- Duet			
Open; Free Combination			

== Overall medal table ==
Rank	Nation	Gold	Silver	Bronze	Total
1	Australia	32	24	14	70
2	New Zealand	10	17	19	46
3	New Caledonia	0	1	8	9
4	Hawaii	0	0	1	1
Totals (4 entries)		42	42	42	126
