= Daisuke Ssegwanyi =

Ugandan swimmer

Personal information
- Full name: Daisuke Ronald Ssegwanyi
- Nationality: Ugandan
- Born: 11 March 1993 (age 33)

Sport
- Sport: Swimming
- Strokes: breaststroke, freestyle
- Updated on 14 January 2014

Daisuke Ronald Ssegwanyi (born 11 March 1993) is a Ugandan swimmer.

== Career ==
Ssegwanyi first competed for Uganda at the 2010 Commonwealth Games in Delhi, where he finished 22nd in the 50 metre breaststroke in 34.65, 26th in the 100 metre breaststroke in 1:20.28, 46th in the 100 metre freestyle in 1:04.41 and 56th in the 50 metre freestyle in 28.60.

At the 2010 FINA World Swimming Championships (25 m) in Dubai, Ssegwanyi finished 80th in the 100 metre breaststroke in 1:19.25, 80th in the 50 metre breaststroke in 34.45, 110th in the 50 metre freestyle in 27.21 and 111th in the 100 metre freestyle in 1:01.72.

== Education ==
Ssegwanyi has a bachelor's degree from Makerere University and is currently pursuing a Masters degree in Japan

== See also ==
- Atuhaire Ambala
- Gilbert Kaburu
- Charles Kagimu
- Ismail Katamba
