= Ashley Delaney =

Australian swimmer

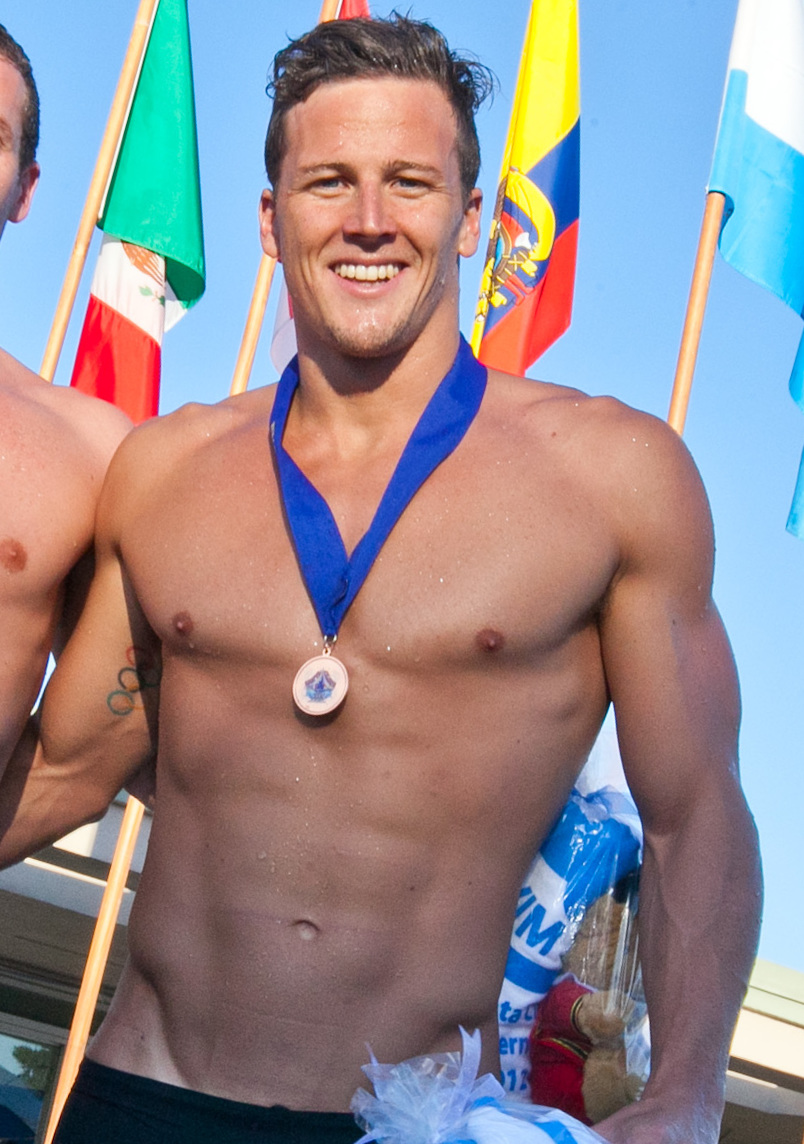

Personal information
- Full name: Ashley Jason Delaney
- Nickname: "Ash"
- National team: Australia
- Born: 11 April 1986 (age 40) Sale, Victoria
- Height: 1.85 m (6 ft 1 in)
- Weight: 82 kg (181 lb)
- Website: ashleydelaney.com

Sport
- Sport: Swimming
- Strokes: backstroke
- Club: Northcote Swimming Club
Medal record
Men's swimming
Representing Australia
Olympic Games
Silver medal – second place	2008 Beijing	4×100 m medley
World Championships (LC)
Silver medal – second place	2013 Barcelona	4×100 m medley
Bronze medal – third place	2009 Rome	4×100 m medley
World Championships (SC)
Bronze medal – third place	2008 Manchester	50 m backstroke
Pan Pacific Championships
Silver medal – second place	2010 Irvine	50 m backstroke
Bronze medal – third place	2010 Irvine	100 m backstroke
Bronze medal – third place	2010 Irvine	4×100 m medley
Commonwealth Games
Gold medal – first place	2010 Delhi	4×100 m medley
Bronze medal – third place	2010 Delhi	50 m backstroke
Bronze medal – third place	2010 Delhi	100 m backstroke
Bronze medal – third place	2010 Delhi	200 m backstroke

Ashley Jason Delaney (born 11 April 1986) is a national-record holding and Olympic and world championship medal-winning swimmer from Australia, who competed at the 2008 Summer Olympics.

== Career ==
His first international success came at the 2006 Oceania Championships, where he set the Championships Records in the 50 m, 100 m and 200 m backstroke.

At the 2008 Telstra Trials he qualified in the 100 m and the 200 m backstroke, placing first and second respectively to qualify for the Olympics in Beijing. He left Beijing with a silver in the 4 × 100 m medley relay, and a fifth-place finish in the 100m backstroke.

In 2009, he won all three backstroke events at the 2009 Telstra Trials, setting national records in the 50 and 200 m. At the World Championships, with arguably Australia's strongest leg absent (freestyler Eamon Sullivan), the medley relay team was overhauled by Germany, finishing with bronze.

In 2010 Delany was bested by longtime rival Hayden Stoeckel in all three backstrokes at the Australian Championships. At the 2010 Pan Pacific Swimming Championships, Delaney won bronze in the 100 m backstroke. He backed up his form on the second night, taking silver in the 50 m. Night 3 saw him finish 4th in the 200m backstroke. On the final night Delaney collected another bronze in the medley relay.

== Career Best Times ==
Long Course Personal bests
Event	Time	Record
50m Backstroke	24.81	Former AUS Record Holder
100m Backstroke	53.10	Former AUS Record Holder
200m Backstroke	1:55.82	Former AUS Record Holder

Short Course Personal bests
Event	Time	Record
50m Backstroke	23.39	
100m Backstroke	50.18	Former AUS Record Holder
200m Backstroke	1:49.62	Former AUS Record Holder

== See also ==
- List of Commonwealth Games medallists in swimming (men)
- List of Olympic medalists in swimming (men)
