= 2010 Pan Pacific Swimming Championships – Men's 50 metre backstroke =

Men's 50 metre backstroke at the 2010 Pan Pacific Swimming Championships
- Venue: William Woollett Jr. Aquatics Center
- Dates: August 19, 2010 (heats & finals)
- Competitors: 22 from 10 nations
- Winning time: 24.86

Medalists
gold medal	Junya Koga	Japan
silver medal	Ashley Delaney	Australia
bronze medal	Nick Thoman	United States

The men's 50 metre backstroke competition at the 2010 Pan Pacific Swimming Championships took place on August 19 at the William Woollett Jr. Aquatics Center. It was the first appearance of this event in the Pan Pacific Swimming Championships.

== Records ==
Prior to this competition, the existing world record was as follows:

World record	Liam Tancock (GBR)	24.04	Rome, Italy	August 2, 2009

== Results ==
All times are in minutes and seconds.

KEY:	q	Fastest non-qualifiers	Q	Qualified	CR	Championships record	NR	National record	PB	Personal best	SB	Seasonal best

=== Heats ===
The first round was held on August 19, at 11:39.

Rank	Heat	Lane	Name	Nationality	Time	Notes
1	1	2	Nick Thoman	United States	24.82	QA, CR
2	1	7	David Plummer	United States	24.87	QA
3	2	3	Ryosuke Irie	Japan	25.20	QA
3	3	5	Ashley Delaney	Australia	25.20	QA
5	1	4	Junya Koga	Japan	25.25	QA
6	3	3	Ben Treffers	Australia	25.26	QA
7	2	4	Daniel Arnamnart	Australia	25.33	QA
8	2	5	Hayden Stoeckel	Australia	25.34	QA
9	3	4	Guilherme Guido	Brazil	25.40	QB
10	3	6	Masafumi Yamaguchi	Japan	25.46	QB
11	1	5	Gláuber Silva	Brazil	25.63	QB
12	2	6	Daniel Bell	New Zealand	25.78	QB
13	2	2	Jake Tapp	Canada	26.00	QB
14	2	7	Gareth Kean	New Zealand	26.01	QB
15	3	8	Park Seon-Kwan	South Korea	26.06	QB
16	3	7	George Bovell	Trinidad and Tobago	26.31	QB
17	1	3	Federico Grabich	Argentina	26.36	
17	2	1	Charles Francis	Canada	26.36	
19	1	1	Matthew Swanston	Canada	26.53	
20	1	6	Robert Hurley	Australia	26.68	
21	3	1	Chung Lai-Yeung	Hong Kong	27.19	
22	3	2	Joaqun Belza	Argentina	27.44	
-	2	8	Tobias Oriwol	Canada	DNS	

=== B Final ===
The B final was held on August 19, at 19:51.

Rank	Lane	Name	Nationality	Time	Notes
9	5	Masafumi Yamaguchi	Japan	25.34	
10	4	Daniel Arnamnart	Australia	25.41	
11	3	Daniel Bell	New Zealand	25.52	
12	7	Park Seon-Kwan	South Korea	25.83	
13	6	Jake Tapp	Canada	25.84	
14	2	Gareth Kean	New Zealand	25.94	
15	8	Charles Francis	Canada	25.95	
16	1	Federico Grabich	Argentina	26.10	

=== A Final ===
The A final was held on August 19, at 19:51.

Rank	Lane	Name	Nationality	Time	Notes
1st place, gold medalist(s)	2	Junya Koga	Japan	24.86	
2nd place, silver medalist(s)	3	Ashley Delaney	Australia	24.98	
3rd place, bronze medalist(s)	4	Nick Thoman	United States	25.02	
4	5	David Plummer	United States	25.09	
5	7	Ben Treffers	Australia	25.32	
6	6	Ryosuke Irie	Japan	25.41	
7	8	Gláuber Silva	Brazil	25.65	
8	1	Guilherme Guido	Brazil	25.83	
