= 2008 FINA World Junior Swimming Championships =

Second iteration of the World Junior Swimming Championships

2008 FINA Youth World Swimming Championships
- Host city: Monterrey, Mexico
- Date(s): 8–13 July, 2008

The 2nd FINA World Junior Swimming Championships, or 2008 Youth Worlds, were held on July 8–13, 2008, in Monterrey, Nuevo León, Mexico.

The Championships were held at the Aquatics Center of the Universidad Autónoma de Nuevo León (Centro Acuático Olímpico Universitario). In May 2008, this same pool hosted the swimming portion of the 2008 Mexican National Olympiad, which served as the country's selection meet for Mexico's teams to the 2008 Olympics.

The male participants had to be 18 years or younger on the 31 December 2008 (i.e. born 1990 or later). The female participants had to be 17 years or younger on the 31 December 2008 (i.e. born 1991 or later).

== Medals table ==
Place	Nation	1st place, gold medalist(s)	2nd place, silver medalist(s)	3rd place, bronze medalist(s)	Total
1	United States	9	6	6	21
2	Russia	7	2	4	13
3	New Zealand	5	0	0	5
4	Australia	4	4	2	10
5	Great Britain	4	2	2	8
6	Italy	3	5	2	10
7	Japan	3	3	6	12
8	Poland	2	1	3	6
9	Germany	1	7	1	9
10	France	1	2	2	5
11	South Africa	1	0	0	1
12	Serbia	0	3	1	4
13	Canada	0	2	6	8
14	Belarus	0	1	1	2
14	Brazil	0	1	1	2
16	Greece	0	1	0	1
17	Venezuela	0	0	2	2
18	Sweden	0	0	1	1
Total		40	40	40	120

== Medal summary ==
=== Boy's events ===
Event	Gold		Silver		Bronze	
Boy's freestyle
50 m	Orinoco Faamausili-Banse; New Zealand	22.37; CR	Luca Dotto; Italy	22.63	Luca Leonardi; Italy	22.70
100 m	Luca Dotto; Italy	50.06; CR	Luca Leonardi; Italy	50.11	Oleg Tikhobaev; Russia	50.33
200 m	Danila Izotov; Russia	1:47.63; CR	Robert Bale; Great Britain	1:49.44	Lucien Hassdenteufel; Germany	1:49.72
400 m	Danila Izotov; Russia	3:51.81; CR	Alex di Giorgio; Italy	3:53.19	Krzysztof Pielowski; Poland	3:53.66
800 m	Heerden Herman; South Africa	8:01.77; CR	Krzystof Pielowski; Poland	8:02.02	Raoul Shaw; France	8:04.71
1500 m	Krzystof Pielowski; Poland	15:25.01; CR	Artem Podyakov; Russia	15:26.56	Raoul Shaw; France	15:31.07
Boy's backstroke
50 m	Benjamin Treffers; Australia	25.60; CR	Pavel Sankovich; Belarus	25.93	Artem Dubovskoy; Russia	26.17
100 m	Daniel Bell; New Zealand	55.32	Benjamin Treffers; Australia	55.77	Chris Walker-Hebborn; Great Britain	56.04
200 m	Kurt Basset; New Zealand	1:59.67; CR	Matthew Swanston; Canada	2:00.53	Radosław Kawęcki; Poland	2:00.72
Boy's breaststroke
50 m	Daniel Sliwinski; Great Britain	28.37; CR	Csaba Szilágyi; Serbia	28.38	Andrea Toniato; Italy	28.40
100 m	Daniel Sliwinski; Great Britain	1:02.19; CR	Marco Koch; Germany	1:02.56	Csaba Szilágyi; Serbia	1:02.57
200 m	Alexey Zinovyev; Russia	2:14.78; CR	Marco Koch; Germany	2:15.27	Robert Holderness; Great Britain	2:15.67
Boy's butterfly
50 m	Daniel Bell; New Zealand	23.61; CR	Ivan Lenđer; Serbia	23.97	Pavel Sankovich; Belarus	24.26
100 m	Daniel Bell; New Zealand	52.52; CR	Ivan Lenđer; Serbia	52.62	Timothy Phillips; United States	52.87
200 m	Yuya Horihata; Japan	1:59.03; CR	Federico Bussolin; Italy	1:59.13	Yusuke Mori; Japan	1:59.32
Boy's individual medley
200 m	Dimitri Colupaev; Germany	2:02.28; CR	Austin Surhoff; United States	2:02.51	Yuya Horihata; Japan	2:02.99
400 m	Andrew Gemmell; United States	4:21.58	Jan-David Schepers; Germany	4:22.10	Keita Sameshima; Japan	4:29.93
Boy's relays
4 × 100 m freestyle	Italy; Luca Dotto; Marco Orsi; Fabio Gimondi; Luca Leonardi	3:19.09; CR	Russia; Artem Lobuzov; Vladimir Bryukhov; Oleg Tikhobaev; Danila Izotov	3:20.64	Brazil; Marcos Macedo; João de Lucca; Renner Lima; Henrique Rodrigues	3:22.81
4 × 200 m freestyle	Great Britain; Robert Bale; Thomas Parris; Ryan Bennett; Christopher Walker-Hebborn	7:20.18; CR	Germany; Joel Ax; Lucien Hassdenteufel; Jan-David Schepers; Dimitri Colupaev	7:20.27	Japan; Kohei Masuda; Yuta Takahashi; Yuki Kobori; Yuya Horihata	7:24.72
4 × 100 m medley	Great Britain; Christopher Walker-Hebborn; Daniel Sliwinski; James Doolan; Robert Bale	3:41.69; CR	Japan; Takashi Iyobe; Takeshi Yamada; Shinri Shioura; Kenta Ito	3:42.61	United States; Timothy Johnson; Eric Friedland; Timothy Phillips; Walter Rumans	3:42.79

=== Girl's events ===
Event	Gold		Silver		Bronze	
Girl's freestyle
50 m	Elodie Schmitt; France	25.88	Hannah Riordan; Canada	25.95	Nathalie Lindborg; Sweden	26.01
100 m	Samantha Tucker; United States	55.59; CR	Silke Lippok; Germany	56.08	Megan Romano; United States	56.32
200 m	Dagny Knutson; United States	1:59.78; CR	Samantha Tucker; United States	2:00.41	Ellen Fullerton; Australia	2:01.18
400 m	Elena Sokolova; Russia	4:06.30; CR, NR	Margaux Fabre; France	4:12.44	Katie Gardocki; United States	4:13.00
800 m	Elena Sokolova; Russia	8:32.75; CR	Katie Gardocki; United States	8:37.08	Andreina Pinto; Venezuela	8:37.82
1500 m	Elena Sokolova; Russia	16:28.77; CR	Kalliopi Araouzou; Greece	16:33.68	Andreina Pinto; Venezuela	16:36.33
Girl's backstroke
50 m	Grace Loh; Australia	28.83; CR	Etiene Medeiros; Brazil	29.44	Elizabeth Pelton; United States	29.45
100 m	Grace Loh; Australia	1:02.02	Elizabeth Pelton; United States	1:02.37	Tess Simpson; Canada	1:02.96
200 m	Zuzanna Mazurek; Poland	2:12.56; CR	Elizabeth Pelton; United States	2:13.53	Karolina Urbanska; Poland	2:13.83
Girl's breaststroke
50 m	Anna Carlson; United States	31.81	Laura Sogar; United States	31.94	Amanda Reason; Canada	32.02
100 m	Samantha Marshall; Australia	1:08.72; CR	Mina Matsushima; Japan	1:08.99	Ekaterina Baklakova; Russia	1:09.06
200 m	Olga Detenyuk; Russia	2:25.19; CR	Keiko Fukudome; Japan	2:25.39	Laura Sogar; United States	2:26.41
Girl's butterfly
50 m	Silvia di Pietro; Italy	26.77; CR	Mélanie Henique; France	27.09	Ellese Zallewsky; Australia	27.13
100 m	Natsuki Akiyama; Japan	59.58	Silvia di Pietro; Italy	59.60	Yui Miyamoto; Japan	1:00.05
200 m	Natsuki Akiyama; Japan	2:08.10; CR	Nina Schiffer; Germany	2:09.36	Yui Miyamoto; Japan	2:09.41
Girl's individual medley
200 m	Dagny Knutson; United States	2:12.97; CR	Ellen Fullerton; Australia	2:14.73	Victoria Andreeva; Russia	2:16.21
400 m	Dagny Knutson; United States	4:43.49; CR	Ellen Fullerton; Australia	4:45.17	Barbara Jardin; Canada	4:49.10
Girl's relays
4 × 100 m freestyle	United States; Dagny Knutson; Megan Romano; Elizabeth Pelton; Samantha Tucker	3:43.54; CR	Germany; Silke Lippok; Franziska Jansen; Lisa Vitting; Sina Sutter	3:46.63	Canada; Hannah Riordan; Hilary Bell; Paige Schultz; Alexandra Gabor	3:47.30
4 × 200 m freestyle	United States; Samantha Tucker; Lily Moldenhauer; Dagny Knutson; Elizabeth Pelton	8:04.49; CR	Great Britain; Sasha Matthews; Rebecca Turner; Lucy Worrall; Lauren Collins	8:06.52	Canada; Alexandra Gabor; Barbara Jardin; Hilary Bell; Paige Schultz	8:10.08
4 × 100 m medley	United States; Elizabeth Pelton; Laura Sogar; Caroline McElhany; Samantha Tucker	4:06.90; CR	Australia; Grace Loh; Samantha Marshall; Ellese Zalewski; Ellen Fullerton	4:07.59	Canada; Tess Simpson; Amanda Reason; Kendra Chernoff; Hannah Riordan	4:07.76

== See also ==
- 2008 in swimming
