= 2010 Pan Pacific Swimming Championships – Men's 4 × 100 metre medley relay =

Men's 4 × 100 metre medley relay at the 2010 Pan Pacific Swimming Championships
- Venue: William Woollett Jr. Aquatics Center
- Dates: August 21, 2010 (heats & finals)
- Winning time: 3:32.48

Medalists
gold medal	Aaron Peirsol, Mark Gangloff, Michael Phelps and Nathan Adrian	United States
silver medal	Junya Koga, Kosuke Kitajima, Masayuki Kishida and Takuro Fujii	Japan
bronze medal	Ashley Delaney, Christian Sprenger, Geoff Huegill and Kyle Richardson	Australia

The men's 4 × 100 metre medley relay competition at the 2010 Pan Pacific Swimming Championships took place on August 21 at the William Woollett Jr. Aquatics Center. The last champion was the United States.

== Records ==
Prior to this competition, the existing world and Pan Pacific records were as follows:

World record	United States (USA); Aaron Peirsol (52.19); Eric Shanteau (58.57); Michael Phelps (49.72); David Walters (46.80)	3:27.28	Rome, Italy	August 2, 2009
Pan Pacific Championships record	United States (USA); Aaron Peirsol (53.74); Brendan Hansen (59.18); Ian Crocker (50.92); Jason Lezak (47.95)	3:31.79	Victoria, Canada	August 20, 2006

== Results ==
All times are in minutes and seconds.

KEY:	q	Fastest non-qualifiers	Q	Qualified	CR	Championships record	NR	National record	PB	Personal best	SB	Seasonal best

=== Heats ===
Heats weren't performed, as only seven teams had entered.

=== Final ===
The final was held on August 21, at 20:27.

Rank	Lane	Name	Nationality	Time	Notes
1st place, gold medalist(s)	4	Aaron Peirsol (53.91); Mark Gangloff (1:00.45); Michael Phelps (50.58); Nathan Adrian (47.54)	United States	3:32.48	
2nd place, silver medalist(s)	6	Junya Koga (53.87); Kosuke Kitajima (59.18); Masayuki Kishida (52.07); Takuro Fujii (48.78)	Japan	3:33.90	
3rd place, bronze medalist(s)	5	Ashley Delaney (53.97); Christian Sprenger (1:01.21); Geoff Huegill (51.45); Kyle Richardson (48.92)	Australia	3:35.55	
4	3	Guilherme Guido (55.05); Tales Cerdeira (1:01.29); Gabriel Mangabeira (52.69); César Cielo (47.83)	Brazil	3:36.86	
5	2	Jake Tapp (55.86); Scott Dickens (1:01.17); Joe Bartoch (52.22); Brent Hayden (47.76)	Canada	3:37.01	
6	1	Gareth Kean (54.94); Glenn Snyders (1:00.48); Moss Burmester (53.73); Carl O'Donnell (49.54)	New Zealand	3:38.69	
7	7	Park Seon-Kwan (55.84); Choi Kyu-Woong (1:02.81); Jeong Doo-Hee (53.67); Park Minkyu (50.68)	South Korea	3:43.00	
