= Swimming at the 2010 Asian Games – Men's 100 metre backstroke =

Men's 100 metre backstroke at the 2010 Asian Games
- Venue: Aoti Aquatics Centre
- Date: 16 November 2010
- Competitors: 29 from 19 nations

Medalists
gold medal	Ryosuke Irie	Japan
silver medal	Junya Koga	Japan
bronze medal	Sun Xiaolei	China

The men's 100 metre backstroke event at the 2010 Asian Games took place on 16 November 2010 at Guangzhou Aoti Aquatics Centre.

There were 29 competitors from 19 countries who took part in this event. Four heats were held, with most containing the maximum number of swimmers (eight). The heat in which a swimmer competed did not formally matter for advancement, as the swimmers with the top eight times from the entire field qualified for the finals.

Ryosuke Irie and Junya Koga from Japan finished with one and two, Sun Xiaolei from China won the bronze medal.

== Schedule ==
All times are China Standard Time (UTC+08:00)

Date	Time	Event
Tuesday, 16 November 2010	10:07	Heats
Tuesday, 16 November 2010	18:56	Final

== Records ==
Prior to this competition, the existing world, Asian and Games records were as follows.

World Record	Aaron Peirsol (USA)	51.94	Indianapolis, United States	8 July 2009
Asian Record	Ryosuke Irie (JPN)	52.24	Kumamoto, Japan	5 September 2009
Games Record	Junichi Miyashita (JPN)	54.64	Doha, Qatar	7 December 2006

== Results ==
=== Heats ===
Rank	Heat	Athlete	Time	Notes
1	3	Junya Koga (JPN)	54.45	GR
2	4	Ryosuke Irie (JPN)	55.57	
3	2	Sun Xiaolei (CHN)	55.75	
4	4	Park Seon-kwan (KOR)	55.77	
5	3	He Jianbin (CHN)	55.91	
6	2	Kim Ji-heun (KOR)	56.61	
7	4	Stanislav Ossinskiy (KAZ)	56.94	
8	4	Yuan Ping (TPE)	57.25	
9	2	Abdullah Al-Thuwaini (IOC)	57.29	
10	2	Rainer Ng (SIN)	57.50	
11	4	Zach Ong (SIN)	57.57	
12	3	Ian James Barr (MAS)	57.94	
13	2	Chung Lai Yeung (HKG)	58.10	
14	4	Danil Bugakov (UZB)	58.93	
15	4	Heshan Unamboowe (SRI)	59.00	
16	3	Daniil Bukin (UZB)	59.09	
17	2	Rehan Poncha (IND)	59.38	
18	3	Charles Walker (PHI)	59.57	
19	2	M. B. Balakrishnan (IND)	59.62	
20	2	Kevin Chu (HKG)	1:00.04	
21	3	Jamal Chavoshifar (IRI)	1:00.39	
22	1	Shuaib Al-Thuwaini (IOC)	1:00.43	
23	4	Antonio Tong (MAC)	1:00.70	
24	1	Mohammed Al-Ghaferi (UAE)	1:02.60	
25	3	Glenn Victor Sutanto (INA)	1:04.11	
26	3	Guntur Pratama Putera (INA)	1:04.81	
27	1	Batsaikhany Dölgöön (MGL)	1:05.61	
28	1	Mohammed Hassan (QAT)	1:06.35	
29	1	Abdulrahman Al-Ollan (QAT)	1:10.09	

=== Final ===
Rank	Athlete	Time	Notes
1st place, gold medalist(s)	Ryosuke Irie (JPN)	53.61	GR
2nd place, silver medalist(s)	Junya Koga (JPN)	53.88	
3rd place, bronze medalist(s)	Sun Xiaolei (CHN)	54.46	
4	Park Seon-kwan (KOR)	54.57	
5	He Jianbin (CHN)	55.36	
6	Kim Ji-heun (KOR)	56.11	
7	Stanislav Ossinskiy (KAZ)	56.30	
8	Yuan Ping (TPE)	57.03	
