= Swimming at the 2007 World Aquatics Championships – Men's 4 × 100 metre freestyle relay =

Men's 4 × 100 metre freestyle relay at the 2007 FINA World Championships
- Venue: Rod Laver Arena
- Date: 25 March 2007
- Teams: 35
- Winning time: 3 minutes 12.72 seconds

Medalists
| gold medal | Michael Phelps; Neil Walker; Cullen Jones; Jason Lezak | United States |
| silver medal | Massimiliano Rosolino; Alessandro Calvi; Christian Galenda; Filippo Magnini | Italy |
| bronze medal | Fabien Gilot; Frédérick Bousquet; Julien Sicot; Alain Bernard | France |

The men's 4 × 100 metre freestyle relay at the 2007 World Aquatics Championships took place on 25 March 2007 at the Rod Laver Arena in Melbourne, Australia. The top-12 finishers from this race qualified for the event at the 2008 Olympics. 35 teams entered in the event, of which 34 swam.

The existing records when the event started were:

- World record (WR): 3:12.46, USA (Phelps, Walker, Jones, Lezak), 19 August 2006 in Victoria, Canada.
- Championship record (CR): 3:13.77, USA (Phelps, Walker, Dusing, Lezak), Montreal 2005 (24 July 2005)

== Results ==
=== Final ===
| Place | Nation | Swimmers | Time | Note |
|---|---|---|---|---|
| 1 | USA | Michael Phelps (48.42), Neil Walker (48.31), Cullen Jones (48.67), Jason Lezak (47.32) | 3:12.72 | CR |
| 2 | Italy | Massimiliano Rosolino (49.35), Alessandro Calvi (49.06), Christian Galenda (48.45), Filippo Magnini (47.18) | 3:14.04 | |
| 3 | France | Fabien Gilot (49.18), Frédérick Bousquet (48.48), Julien Sicot (48.84), Alain Bernard (48.18) | 3:14.68 | |
| 4 | South Africa | Ryk Neethling (49.17), Lyndon Ferns (48.46), Gerhard Zandberg (49.16), Roland Schoeman (47.98) | 3:14.77 | |
| 5 | Australia | Eamon Sullivan (48.88), Ashley Callus (48.86), Andrew Lauterstein (49.17), Kenrick Monk (48.98) | 3:15.89 | |
| 6 | Sweden | Petter Stymne (49.78), Stefan Nystrand (48.17), Lars Frölander (48.71), Christoffer Wikström (49.43) | 3:16.09 | |
| 7 | Canada | Brent Hayden (48.55), Matt Rose (49.42), Rick Say (48.88), Joel Greenshields (50.06) | 3:16.91 | |
| 8 | Brazil | César Cielo (48.63), Nicolas Oliveira (48.82), Rodrigo Castro (49.45), Thiago Pereira (50.13) | 3:17.03 | SA |

=== Heats ===
| Rank | Nation | Swimmers | Time | Note |
|---|---|---|---|---|
| 1 | Italy | Lorenzo Vismara, Christian Galenda, Alessandro Calvi, Filippo Magnini | 3:15.83 | Q Olympic |
| 2 | Sweden | Petter Stymne, Stefan Nystrand, Christoffer Wikström, Marcus Piehl | 3:16.16 | Q Olympic |
| 3 | USA | Garrett Weber-Gale, Ben Wildman-Tobriner, Cullen Jones, Neil Walker | 3:16.43 | Q Olympic |
| 4 | Australia | Eamon Sullivan, Michael Klim, Patrick Murphy, Kenrick Monk | 3:16.46 | Q Olympic |
| 5 | France | Fabien Gilot, Grégory Mallet, Julien Sicot, Amaury Leveaux | 3:16.51 | Q Olympic |
| 6 | Canada | Rick Say, Matt Rose, Joel Greenshields, Brent Hayden | 3:17.38 | Q Olympic |
| 7 | Brazil | César Cielo, Nicolas Oliveira, Eduardo Deboni, Rodrigo Castro | 3:18.00 | Q Olympic |
| 8 | South Africa | Ryk Neethling, Lyndon Ferns, Gerhard Zandberg, Jean Basson | 3:18.15 | Q Olympic |
| 9 | (United Kingdom) Great Britain | Chris Cozens, Simon Burnett, Ross Davenport, Ben Hockin | 3:18.96 | Olympic |
| 10 | (Germany) | Jens Schreiber, Michael Schubert, Jens Thiele, Lars Conrad | 3:19.00 | Olympic |
| 11 | Switzerland | Dominik Meichtry, Karel Novy, Alessandro Gaffuri, Flori Lang | 3:19.22 | Olympic |
| 12 | (Japan) | Takamitsu Kojima, Makoto Ito, Hiroaki Yamamoto, Daisuke Hosokawa | 3:19.70 | Olympic |
| 13 | Croatia | Bruno Barbic, Mario Todorović, Mario Delač, Igor Čerenšek | 3:20.53 | |
| 14 | Venezuela | Luis Rojas, Octavio Alesi, Crox Acuña, Albert Subirats | 3:21.21 | |
| 15 | (China) | HUANG Shaohua, CAI Li, LU Zhiwu, CHEN Zuo | 3:21.26 | |
| 16 | New Zealand | Cameron Gibson, Robert Voss, Mark Herring, Michael Jack | 3:21.73 | |
| 17 | Uruguay | Paul Kutscher, Gabriel Melconian, Francisco Picasso, Martín Kutscher | 3:22.13 | |
| 18 | Kazakhstan | Stanislav Kuzmin, Alaxandr Sklyar, Vitaliy Khan, Vyacheslav Titarenko | 3:23.11 | |
| 19 | India | Ankur Poseria, Arjun Muralidharan, Sandeep Nagar Anthal, Virdhawal Khade | 3:32.51 | |
| 20 | Kenya | Jason Dunford, David Dunford, Rama Vyombo, Amar Shah | 3:32.60 | |
| 21 | Indonesia | Brian Howard Ho, Albert Cristiadi Sutanto, Felix Cristiadi Sutanto, Andy Wibowo | 3:34.26 | |
| 22 | (United States Virgin Islands) Virgin Islands | Keiran Locke, Morgan Locke, Kevin Hensley, Josh Laban | 3:34.92 | |
| 23 | Peru | Nikola Ustadvich, Jose Emmanuel Crescimbeni, Oscar Jahnsen, Sebastian Jahnsen | 3:35.63 | |
| 24 | Macau | Wing Cheung Victor Wong, Wui Chon Cheong, Kin Wa Cheong, Hong Name Lei | 3:46.10 | |
| 25 | Guam | Carlos Shimizu, Celestino Aguon, Hernan Bonsembiante, Christopher Duenas | 3:50.46 | |
| 26 | Guyana | Onan Thom, Niall Roberts, Jamaal Sobers, Yannick Roberts | 3:55.87 | |
| 27 | Thailand | Suriya Suksuphak, Radomyos Matjiur, Arwut Chinnapasaen, Tharnawat Thanakornworakiart | 3:56.05 | |
| 28 | Mongolia | Batchuluun Mendbayar, Battushig Enkhtaivan, Butekhuils Boldbaatar, Tamir Andrei | 3:56.81 | |
| 29 | Lesotho | Thabiso Baholo (1:22.22), Lehlohonolo Moromella (1:34.45), Boipelo Makhothi (1:18.30), Seele Benjamin Ntai (1:27.99) | 5:42.96 | NR |
| -- | Nigeria | | DNS | |
| -- | Uzbekistan | Ravil Nachaev, Sergey Tsoy, Petr Romashkin, Danil Bugakov | DQ | |
| -- | Russia | Andrey Grechin, Andrey Kapralov, Sergey Fesikov, Evgeny Lagunov | DQ | |
| -- | Lithuania | Rolandas Gimbutis, Saulius Binevičius, Paulius Viktoravicius, Vytautas Janušaitis | DQ | |
| -- | Singapore | Shirong Jeffrey Su, Quee Lim Ernest Teo, Bing Ming Thum, Russell Ong | DQ | |
| -- | Ukraine | Andriy Serdinov, Oleksandr Tsepukh, Oleksandr Isakov, Yuriy Yegoshin | DQ | |

== See also ==
- Swimming at the 2005 World Aquatics Championships – Men's 4 × 100 metre freestyle relay
- Swimming at the 2008 Summer Olympics – Men's 4 × 100 metre freestyle relay
- Swimming at the 2009 World Aquatics Championships – Men's 4 × 100 metre freestyle relay
