= Dagny Knutson =

American swimmer

Personal information
- Nickname: "Dags"
- National team: United States
- Born: January 18, 1992 (age 34) Fayetteville, North Carolina, U.S.
- Height: 5 ft 10 in (178 cm)
- Weight: 150 lb (68 kg)

Sport
- Sport: Swimming
- Strokes: Freestyle, medley
- Club: FAST Swim Team (FAST-CA)
Medal record
Women's swimming
Representing the United States
World Championships (LC)
Gold medal – first place	2011 Shanghai	4×200 m freestyle
Silver medal – second place	2009 Rome	4x200 m freestyle

Dagny Knutson (born January 18, 1992) is an American swimmer of Norwegian heritage. Knutson is a former American record holder in 400-yard individual medley and holds several high school national records. She finished swimming competitively in 2012 and in 2013, due to her struggles with bulimia and financial strains.

== Swimming career ==
At the 2008 FINA Youth World Swimming Championships, Knutson won a total of five medals, all of them gold. At the 2008 Short Course Nationals, Knutson broke Katie Hoff's American record in the 400-yard individual medley with a time of 4:00.62, a record which has since been broken by Julia Smit. At the 2009 Junior Pac Pacs, she set five meet records while winning seven gold medals and a bronze.

At the 2009 National Championships, Knutson qualified to swim in the 4x200 m freestyle relay at the 2009 World Aquatics Championships in Rome by placing fifth in the 200 m freestyle. In Rome, Knutson swam in the heats of the 4x200 m freestyle relay (with Ariana Kukors, Alyssa Anderson, and Lacey Nymeyer) and won a silver medal after the United States placed second in the finals. As the second leg, Knutson had a 1:57.73 split.

At the 2010 National Championships, Knutson did not qualify to swim in any individual events at the 2010 Pan Pacific Swimming Championships. Knutson placed 4th in the 400 m freestyle, 5th in the 200 m freestyle, 6th in the 400 m individual medley, and 19th in the 200 m butterfly.

At the 2011 World Aquatics Championships in Shanghai, Knutson won a gold medal in the 4×200-meter freestyle relay with Missy Franklin, Katie Hoff, and Allison Schmitt, with the team finishing ahead of Australia and China. As the second leg, Knutson had a 1:57.18 split.

== Personal life ==
Knutson started swimming at the age of 9. Her parents, Jim and Ronda, were both college athletes. Her parents have chosen for her a Norwegian name. Her father was a US Citizen and his parents had moved to America from Norway, and her name honors that lineage.

Knutson's hometown is Minot, North Dakota, but she has trained at the University of Florida after briefly training with Auburn University then FAST in Fullerton, California. Because of geographic proximity, Knutson used to swim in so many meets in Canada that she was once mistakenly named one of that country's top 12-year-old swimmers.

== Personal bests ==
Event	Time	Venue	Date
100 m freestyle	55.37	Guam	August 1, 2011
200 m freestyle	1:56.91	Shanghai (time trial)	July 24, 2011
400 m freestyle	4:08.80	Irvine	August 3, 2010
200 m individual medley	2:10.79	Guam	January 8, 2009
400 m individual medley	4:36.02	Santa Clara	June 11, 2009

All times were set in a 50 metres pool.

== See also ==
- List of World Aquatics Championships medalists in swimming (women)
