= Kirsten Cameron =

New Zealand swimmer

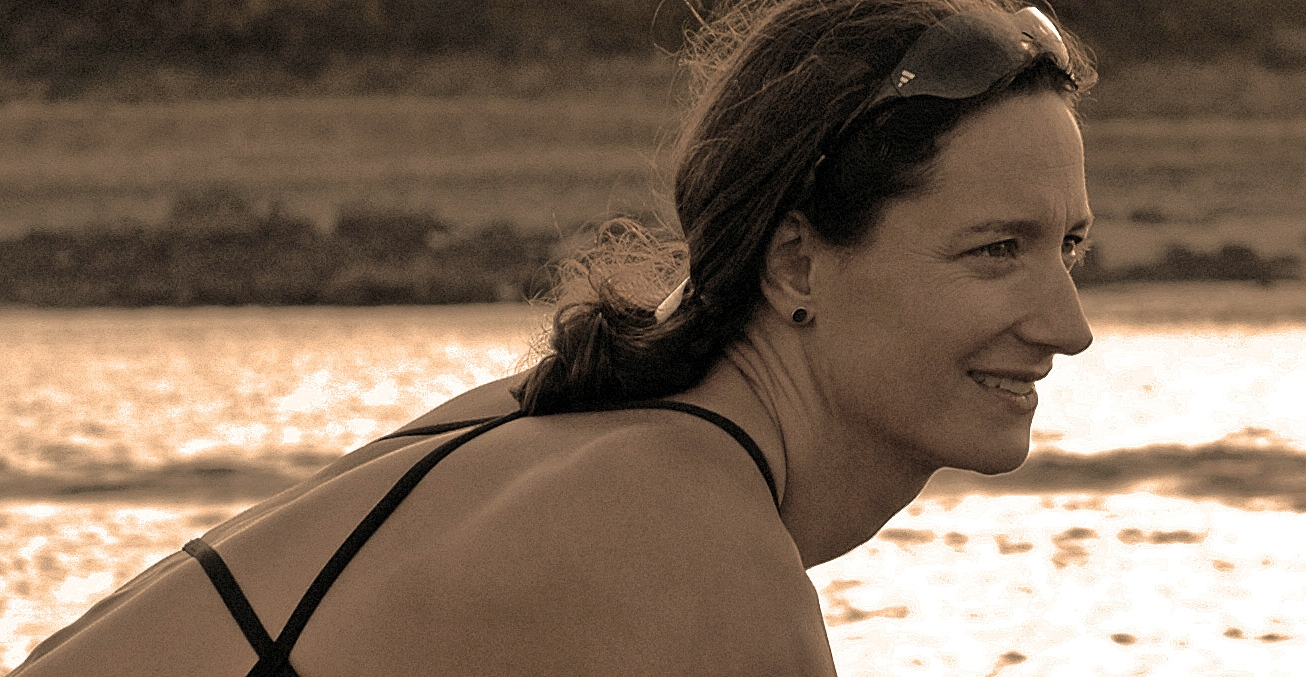

Personal information
- Born: 1973 (age 52–53) Masterton, New Zealand

Sport
- Sport: Swimming
- Strokes: Long-distance swimming, open water swimming

Kirsten Cameron (born 1973) is a former New Zealand distance freestyle and open water swimmer and a world record holder in Masters swimming in the 30-34, 35-39 and 40-44 age groups. She was the 2009 national inaugural champion for women's 10 km open-water swim. Cameron started competitive swimming in 2004.

== 2016 ==
- Masters World Record 800m Freestyle SC 40-44yrs, Dutch Short Course Masters Nationals, Papendrecht.
- European Masters Record 200m Freestyle LC 40-44yrs, Dutch Long Course Masters Nationals, Eindhoven.

== 2015 ==
- Masters World Record 1500m SC 40-44yrs, North West Masters Meet, Wigan.
- Masters World Record 1500m LC 40-44yrs, Dutch Long Course Masters Nationals, Eindhoven. (Bettering her own record by 20secs)
- European Masters Records 1500, 800m, 400m, 200m, Dutch Long Course Masters Nationals, Eindhoven.
- European Masters Records 800m, 400m 200m LC 40-44yrs, British Masters Nationals, Manchester.
- European Masters Record 800m SC 40-44yrs, Jersey.
- T30 Postal swim = 2520m.

== 2014 ==
- On 5 August Cameron took part in an English Channel relay that made it to France in 7 hours and 3 minutes. The team was put together by Wayne Soutter from a group of world class and all over 40 years old swimmers. The team was Andrew Chamberlain, Bernie Zeruhn, Christof Wandratsch, David Warren, Steve West and Kirsten Cameron. Their time broke the Swimming Channel Association record for a 6-person team.
- European Masters records Short Course 40-44yrs, 1500m, 800m, 400m, 200m, Jersey.
- Masters World Record 1500m LC 40-44yrs, British Masters Nationals, Swansea.
- European Masters records Long Course 40-44yrs, 1500m, 400m, 200m, British Masters Nationals, Swansea.
- One Hour Postal Swim - 4840m.

== 2013 ==
- 2013 New Zealand Open Water Championships, Taupo 12/13 January - Bronze Medal in the Open 5 km race.
- 2013 Wellington Open LC Championships, Wellington 18–21 January - Silver Medal, Women's 1500m Freestyle. Personal Best Time - 17.20.27.
- Jersey Masters Open Short Course 27–28 September Broke World Record in the freestyle women 40-44 Age Group for 1500M and 800M.
- ASA National Short Course Champs 25–27 October broke her own 1500M World Record 17.04. During the same race broke her existing 800M World Record 8.59.
- ASA National Short Course Champs 25–27 October broke the 800M World Record for the second time in two days - 8.56.23.

== 2012 ==
- World Masters Records 35-39 Age Group, 800m, 1500m LC Freestyle, NSW State Masters Long Distance Long Course Championships, November 2012.
- Denarau to Beachcomber 19 km Open Water Swim 2012, Fiji. 1st Woman, 2nd Overall. Women's Course Record
- 2012 Australian Masters National Swim Champs Gold Medalist 35-39 Age Group, 200m, 400m, 800m Freestyle. Silver Medalist, 50m, 100m Freestyle.
- Australian Masters Record Holder 35-39 Age Group, 200m, 400m, 800m LC Freestyle.

== 2011 ==
FINA at this stage are refusing to ratify the following swims as they do not recognise the Out Games as a sanctioned meet, despite it being sanctioned by NZ Masters (A FINA Member) and run by Swim Wellington (A FINA Member).

- FINA World Masters Record Holder 800m LC Freestyle, 35-39 Age Group, 2nd Asia Pacific Out Games, Wellington, NZ (beat own world record)
- FINA World Masters Record Holder 400m LC Freestyle, 35-39 Age Group, 2nd Asia Pacific Out Games, Wellington, NZ
- FINA World Masters Record Holder 1500m LC Freestyle, 35-39 Age Group, 2nd Asia Pacific Out Games, Wellington, NZ (beat own world record)
- New Zealand Masters Record Holder 200m LC Freestyle, 35-39 Age Group, 2nd Asia Pacific Out Games, Wellington, NZ (beat own NZ record)

== 2010 ==
- New Zealand Masters Swimmer of the Year 2010
- FINA World Masters Swim Champ and Gold Medallist 100m, 200m, 400m, 800m Freestyle in 35-39 Age Group and 3 km Open Water, Goteburg, Sweden (Reference www.2010finamasters.org)
- FINA World Masters Record Holder, 800m LC Freestyle 35-39 Age Group, Goteburg, Sweden (beat own World Record)(Swimming NZ News Article)
- FINA World Masters Record Holder, 800m SC Freestyle 35-39 Age Group, South Island Short Course Masters Champs - Nelson NZ
- Winner, Plantation Island 3 km and 10 km Open Water Swim, Fiji
- FINA World Masters Record Holder, 1500m SC Freestyle 35-39 Age Group, North Island Short Course Masters Champs, Papakura, NZ

== 2009 ==
- Gold Medal in Swimming NZ's Inaugural 10 km Open Water Championship, held in Wellington.
- FINA World Masters Record Holder, 1500m LC Freestyle 35-39 Age Group
- Waikato Open Record Holder, 1500m SC Freestyle, 800m SC Freestyle
- 13th FINA Marathon Swimming World Cup 10 km Swim Varna Bulgaria. (Refer Wairarapa Times Age 4 September 2009, Local Sport article, "When Push Comes to Shove it Must be Open Water Swimming.")
- Attended World Masters Games 2009 in Sydney, Australia. Gold in 100m, 200m, 400m, 800m Freestyle in 35-39 Age Group, Silver in 50m Freestyle. All times were New Zealand Masters Records. The 400m Freestyle and 800m Freestyle were inside the World Masters Records. However, FINA decided that the World Masters Games were not an appropriate venue for World Records and refused to ratify any World Records set at this meet, despite being a Masters Sanctioned meet and run according to FINA regulations. The reason given was that some non-masters registered swimmers may have been competing. The times, however, will still stand as New Zealand Masters Records and will still be counted in the World Masters Top 10 Tabulations. Therefore, the Fastest World Masters 800m time in the 35-39 Age Group is six seconds faster than the actual World Record. (Both times swum by Cameron.) Refer Wairarapa Times Age 22 October 2009, Local Sport article, "Camerons world records in doubt".

== 2008 ==
- FINA World Masters Record Holder, 800m Freestyle 35-39 Age Group

== 2007 ==
- Silver Medalist 10 km South Australian Open Water Champs, Adelaide
- Silver Medalist 5 km South Australian Open Water Champs, Adelaide
- 19th, FINA Marathon Swimming World Cup 10 km Race Hong Kong
- 11th, FINA Marathon Swimming World Cup 10 km Race Singapore
- Gold Medalist 800M Freestyle, New Zealand Spring Meet, Wellington
- Bronze Medalist 400M Freestyle, New Zealand Spring Meet, Wellington
- Silver medallist 800 m Freestyle, New Zealand Youth and Open Swim Champs, Christchurch
- Bronze medallist 400 m Freestyle, New Zealand Youth and Open Swim Champs, Christchurch
- Holder of the cup for 1st person home (men and women), first women and best newcomer in the Kapiti Island to Mainland Swim, Wellington.
- Silver Medallist 5 km New Zealand Open Water Swim Champs.
- Long Course World Record Holder for the 30-34 Age Group in the 400M and 800M freestyle
- Short Course World Record Holder for the 30-34 Age Group in 800M and 1500M freestyle

== 2006 ==
- FINA World Masters Record Holder, Women's 800 m Freestyle 30-34yr.
- FINA World Masters Swim Champ and Gold medallist 100 m, 200 m, 400 m, 800 m Freestyle in 30-34 age group and 3 km Open Water, San Francisco.
- Bronze medallist 10 km Oceania Swim Champs, Cairns, Australia.
- Bronze medallist 5 km Oceania Swim Champs, Cairns, Australia.
- Silver medallist Women's 4 × 200 m freestyle Relay, Oceania Swim Champs, Cairns, Australia.
- Bronze medallist 800 m Freestyle, New Zealand Summer Champs, Auckland.
- 13th 10 km Australian Open Water Swim Champs, Melbourne, Australia.
- 7th 5 km Australian Open Water Swim Champs, Melbourne, Australia.
- 25th 10 km World Open Water Champs, Naples, Italy.
- Retired due to injury in Pan Pacific Swim Champs, Victoria, Canada from 10 km.
- New Zealand Masters Records in 30-34yr Women in 200 m, 400 m, 800 m and 1500 m.
