= Khosi Mokhesi =

Basotho swimmer (born 1986)

Personal information
- Full name: Khosi Odilon Mokhesi
- Nationality: Basotho
- Born: 23 August 1986 (age 39)

Sport
- Sport: Swimming
- Strokes: backstroke, breaststroke, freestyle
- Updated on 14 January 2014

Khosi Odilon Mokhesi (born 23 August 1986) is a Basotho swimmer.

== Career ==
Mokhesi first competed for Lesotho at the 2008 Swimming World Cup event in Durban where he finished 28th in the 50 metre freestyle in 30.18. The following year at the 2009 Swimming World Cup event in Durban, Mokhesi finished 22nd in the 50 metre backstroke in 50.13, 25th in the 100 metre breaststroke in 1:33.22, 28th in the 50 metre breaststroke in 43.93, 36th in the 50 metre freestyle in 31.75 and 40th in the 100 metre freestyle in 1:16.31.

At the 2010 Commonwealth Games in Delhi, Mokhesi finished 26th in the 50 metre breaststroke in 43.71, 29th in the 100 metre breaststroke in 1:37.73, 48th in the 100 metre freestyle in 1:15.91 and 58th in the 50 metre freestyle in 33.43.
