= Swimming at the 2010 Asian Games – Men's 50 metre backstroke =

Men's 50 metre backstroke at the 2010 Asian Games
- Venue: Aoti Aquatics Centre
- Date: 18 November 2010
- Competitors: 31 from 21 nations

Medalists
gold medal	Junya Koga	Japan
silver medal	Ryosuke Irie	Japan
bronze medal	Cheng Feiyi	China

The men's 50 backstroke at the 2010 Asian Games took place on 18 November 2010 at Guangzhou Aoti Aquatics Centre.

There were 31 competitors from 21 countries who took part in this event. Four heats were held, with most containing the maximum number of swimmers (eight). The heat in which a swimmer competed did not formally matter for advancement, as the swimmers with the top eight times from the entire field qualified for the finals.

Junya Koga and Ryosuke Irie from Japan finished with one and two, Cheng Feiyi from China won the bronze medal.

== Schedule ==
All times are China Standard Time (UTC+08:00)

Date	Time	Event
Thursday, 18 November 2010	09:00	Heats
Thursday, 18 November 2010	18:00	Final

== Records ==
Prior to this competition, the existing world, Asian and Games records were as follows.

World Record	Liam Tancock (GBR)	24.04	Rome, Italy	2 August 2009
Asian Record	Junya Koga (JPN)	24.24	Rome, Italy	2 August 2009
Games Record	Junya Koga (JPN)	25.40	Doha, Qatar	7 December 2006

== Results ==
Legend

- DNS — Did not start

=== Heats ===
Rank	Heat	Athlete	Time	Notes
1	4	Junya Koga (JPN)	25.42	
2	3	Ryosuke Irie (JPN)	25.67	
3	2	Cheng Feiyi (CHN)	25.74	
4	4	Park Seon-kwan (KOR)	26.16	
5	3	Zhang Yu (CHN)	26.23	
6	2	Rainer Ng (SIN)	26.32	
7	2	Stanislav Ossinskiy (KAZ)	26.52	
8	3	Glenn Victor Sutanto (INA)	26.56	
9	4	Abdullah Al-Thuwaini (IOC)	26.62	
10	4	I Gede Siman Sudartawa (INA)	26.72	
11	2	Yuan Ping (TPE)	26.79	
12	3	Chung Lai Yeung (HKG)	26.84	
13	4	Danil Bugakov (UZB)	26.86	
14	2	Kim Ji-heun (KOR)	26.99	
15	3	Zach Ong (SIN)	27.01	
16	3	Ian James Barr (MAS)	27.46	
17	3	M. B. Balakrishnan (IND)	27.63	
18	3	Jamal Chavoshifar (IRI)	27.70	
19	4	Heshan Unamboowe (SRI)	27.76	
20	2	Antonio Tong (MAC)	28.01	
21	1	Shuaib Al-Thuwaini (IOC)	28.05	
22	4	Iurii Zakharov (KGZ)	28.13	
23	2	Mohammed Al-Ghaferi (UAE)	28.49	
24	1	Lao Kuan Fong (MAC)	28.74	
25	2	Obaid Al-Jasmi (UAE)	28.89	
26	1	Batsaikhany Dölgöön (MGL)	30.37	
27	1	Mohammed Hassan (QAT)	30.95	
28	1	Mohammed Al-Mahmoud (QAT)	31.22	
29	1	Ammar Ghanim (YEM)	34.85	
30	1	Saylom Souvannala (LAO)	35.15	
—	4	Daniil Bukin (UZB)	DNS	

=== Final ===
Rank	Athlete	Time	Notes
1st place, gold medalist(s)	Junya Koga (JPN)	25.08	GR
2nd place, silver medalist(s)	Ryosuke Irie (JPN)	25.16	
3rd place, bronze medalist(s)	Cheng Feiyi (CHN)	25.30	
4	Park Seon-kwan (KOR)	25.75	
5	Zhang Yu (CHN)	25.95	
6	Stanislav Ossinskiy (KAZ)	26.21	
7	Glenn Victor Sutanto (INA)	26.31	
8	Rainer Ng (SIN)	26.48	
