= Corney Swanepoel =

New Zealand swimmer (born 1986)

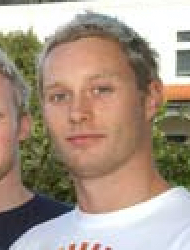
- Swanepoel in 2007

Personal information
- National team: New Zealand
- Born: 17 March 1986 (age 40) Potchefstroom, South Africa
- Height: 1.88 m (6 ft 2 in)

Sport
- Sport: Swimming
- Strokes: Butterfly
- Club: Dolphins Swim Club / Vineyward Swim Club / Roskill Swim Club / North Shore Swimming Club
- Coach: Karoly von Toros / Thomas Ansorg / Jan Cameron (coach)
Medal record
World Championships (SC)
| Bronze medal – third place | 2008 Manchester | 4x100 m medley |
Oceania Championships
| Gold medal – first place | 2004 Suva | 50 m butterfly |
| Gold medal – first place | 2004 Suva | 100 m butterfly |
| Gold medal – first place | 2006 Queensland | 50 m butterfly |
| Gold medal – first place | 2006 Queensland | 100 m butterfly |
| Gold medal – first place | 2008 Christchurch | 50 m butterfly |
| Gold medal – first place | 2008 Christchurch | 4x100 m medley |
| Silver medal – second place | 2004 Suva | 4x100 m medley |
| Silver medal – second place | 2006 Queensland | 4x100 m medley |
| Silver medal – second place | 2008 Christchurch | 100 m butterfly |
Commonwealth Youth Games
| Gold medal – first place | 2018 Bendigo | 50 m freestyle |
| Gold medal – first place | 2018 Bendigo | 50 m butterfly |
| Gold medal – first place | 2018 Bendigo | 4x100 m medley |
| Silver medal – second place | 2018 Bendigo | 4x100 m freestyle |
| Bronze medal – third place | 2018 Bendigo | 4x200 m freestyle |

Corney Swanepoel (born 17 March 1986 in Potchefstroom, South Africa) is a former competitive swimmer who represented New Zealand at the 2004 and 2008 Olympics.

Swanepoel moved to New Zealand in 2002 and attended Rangitoto College.

During his decorated career, Swanepoel competed in four World Championships, two World Championships (25m), as well as the 2006 Commonwealth Games and 2006 Pan Pacific Championships. He was part of the 4x100 metre medley relay team that won the bronze medal at the 2008 World Championships (25m) and claimed numerous Oceania Championships medals including winning the 50 metre butterfly three times in a row between 2004 and 2008.

Swanepoel still holds New Zealand long course, short course, relay and age group records as well as Oceania Championship records.

Following his retirement in 2012, Swanepoel has worked in business.

== Swimming career ==
As a junior in South Africa, Swanepoel trained at the Dolphins Swim Club in Potchefstroom before moving to the Vineyard Swim Club in Cape Town.

He was named ASB Young Sports Person of the year in 2004.

=== 2003 World championships ===
Swanepoel's first major senior international meet for New Zealand was the 2003 World Aquatics Championships in Barcelona, Spain. He finished 19th in the 100 metre butterfly in a time of 53.95 and 31st in the 50 metre butterfly in a time of 24.80.

=== 2004 Oceania championships ===
Swanepoel completed the butterfly double at the 2004 Oceania Swimming Championships held in Suva, Fiji with gold medals in the 50 metre butterfly in a time of 24.25 and in the 100 metre butterfly in a time of 53.30. The time set by Swanepoel in the 100 metre butterfly was a championship record thatlasted until 2008. He also claimed a silver medal in the 4x100 metre medley relay alongside Scott Talbot-Cameron, Ben Labowitch and Cameron Gibson.

=== 2004 Olympics ===
Swanepoel qualified for the 2004 Summer Olympics at New Zealand nationals when he swim 52.50 and in the process, broke the New Zealand record despite still being at school.

After swimming 53.07 in the heats of the 100 metre butterfly, Swanepoel moved into the semi-finals ranked 15th, before improving his time again to 52.99 although this was not good enough to progress, finishing in 13th overall.

Combining with Scott Talbot-Cameron, Ben Labowitch and Cameron Gibson in the 4x100 metre medley relay, the team finished 12th in a time of 3:42.74.

=== 2004 Commonwealth Youth Games ===
Concluding the year, Swanepoel put together an impressive performance at the 2004 Commonwealth Youth Games held in Bendigo, Australia. Swanepoel took home individual gold medals in the 50 metre freestyle (23.83), 50 metre butterfly (24.66) and 100 metre butterfly (53.90) sharing the podium with teammate Matt Thomas who finished second in both the butterfly events. He was also part of the 4x100 metre medley team that won gold (John Zulch, Glenn Synders and Dean Burger), the 4x100 metre freestyle team that won silver (Thomas, Burger and John Zulch) and the 4x200 metre freestyle team that won bronze (Burger, Zulch and Bryn Murphy). He also finished 4th in the 100 metre freestyle in a time of 52.53.

=== 2005 World championships ===
At the 2005 World Aquatics Championships in Montreal, Canada, Swanepoel narrowly missed the semi-finals of the 100 metre butterfly in a 53.62, finishing behind compatriot Moss Burmester. He also competed in the 50 metre butterfly, finishing 25th in a time of 24.56, and in the 100 metre freestyle in a time of 52.34.

=== 2006 Commonwealth Games ===
Swanepoel competed at the 2006 Commonwealth games held in Melbourne, Australia. In the final of the 100 meter butterfly, Swanepoel finished 4th in a time of 53.14 behind Ryan Pini of Papua New Guinea, Michael Klim of Australia and Burmester. In the 50 metre butterfly, Swanepoel exited in the semi-finals after recording a time of 24.30. He also swum in the heats of the 4x100 metre medley relay.

=== 2006 World championships ===
Swanepoel was back in the pool racing a month later at the 2006 FINA World Swimming Championships (25 m) held in Shanghai, China. He finished in 29th in the 50 metre butterfly in a time of 24.43, and 33rd in the 100 metre butterfly in a time of 54.22 in his individual events, while again helped qualify the 4x100 metre mixed medley relay into the final.

=== 2006 Oceania championships ===
Racing at the 2006 Oceania Swimming Championships in Queensland, Australia, Swanepool claimed gold medals in the 50 meter butterfly in a time of 24.33 and the 100 meter butterfly in a time of 54.51. He was also part of the 4x100 metre medley relay team alongside Zulch, Synders and Robert Voss that finished second behind Australia.

Swanepoel was named male swimmer of the meet at the conclusion of racing.

=== 2006 Pan-Pacific Games ===
Capping off a busy 2006, Swanepoel raced at the 2006 Pan Pacific Swimming Championships held in Victoria, Canada. His best result was an 8th place in the B-Final of the 100 metre butterfly in a time of 54.52. He also finished in 29th in the 50 metre freestyle in a time of 23.51, and 41st in the 100 metre freestyle in a time of 51.63 (and just ahead of team mate Michael Jack). In relays, Swanepoel led off the 4x100 metre freestyle relay alongside Jack, Voss and Gibson with the team finishing 5th in the final but anchored the 4x100 metre medley relay along with Zulch, Snyders and Burmester that finished 6th.

=== 2007 World championships ===
At the 2007 World Aquatics Championships held in Melbourne, Australia, Swanepoel reached the semi-finals of the 100 metre butterfly. However, his time of 52.46 in the heats was faster than his semi-finals swim of 52.94. He then finished 20th in the 50 metre butterfly in a time of 24.20. The 4x100 metre medley relay team of Gibson, Snyders, Swanepoel and Mark Herring did not progress to the final of the event.

=== 2007 Summer Universiade ===
Swanepoel raced at the 2007 Summer Universiade held in Bangkok, Thailand. He finished 4th equal alongside Johannes Dietrich in the 50 metre butterfly in a time of 24.07, and 5th in the 100 meter butterfly in a time of 53.14, narrowly in front of compatriot Burmester.

=== 2008 World championships ===
Building into the Olympic year, Swanepoel put together arguable his best set of results at an international meet during the 2008 FINA World Swimming Championships (25 m) held in Manchester, United Kingdom. He finished in 6th place in the final of the 100 metre butterfly in a time of 51.20 and narrowly missed the final of the 50 metre butterfly by one spot in a time of 23.31. Despite qualifying 8th in the final of the 4x100 metre medley relay, the quartet of Daniel Bell, Snyders, Swanepoel and Gibson claimed the bronze medal ahead of Australia, Great Britain and Brazil.

=== 2008 Oceania championships ===
Taking part in his third Oceania Championships, this time held in Christchurch, New Zealand. Swanepoel won the 50 meter butterfly for a third straight competition and set a new championship record that still stands today of 23.98 in the process. However, he could not defend his 100 meter butterfly title that he had won in 2004 and 2006 as Ryan Pini from Papua New Guinea backed up his 2006 Commonwealth Games gold medal. Swanepoel combined with Bell, Snyders and Gibson to set a new championship record in a time of 3:38.62 that also still remains today.

=== 2008 Olympic Games ===
Swanepoel competed at the 2008 Summer Olympics held in Beijing, China. He made the semi-finals of the 100 metre butterfly in a time of 51.78 and in the process broke the New Zealand record. In the semi-finals, he finished 6th in a time of 52.01. He was also part of the 4x100 metre medley relay team alongside Bell, Snyders and Gibson that finished an impressive 5th place and set a new New Zealand record in a time of 3:33.39.

Swanepoel was sent home before the end of the event with fellow swimmers Gibson and Dean Kent after an incident involving a drunk teammate.

=== 2009 World championships ===
At the 2009 World Aquatics Championships held in Rome, Italy, Swanepoel set a new New Zealand record in the 50 metre butterfly in the heats with a time of 23.40. He eventually finished 15th in the semi-finals in a time of 23.50. In the 100 metre butterfly, Swanepoel also made the semi-final with a 51.71 before finishing 16th overall in a time of 51.79. Despite the 4x100 metre mixed relay team from the 2008 Summer Olympics combining again, as well as swimming faster, in what would be a new New Zealand record that still remains today, the team failed to make the final.

Swanepoel retired from swimming after missing selection for the 2012 Summer Olympics.

He currently holds the New Zealand Records in the 50 metre butterfly short course at 22.60 (2009), 100 metre butterfly short course at 50.42 (2009) and 100 metre butterfly long course at 51.61 (2009). Swanepoel's 4x100 metre medley relay record set at the 2009 World championships alongside Daniel Bell, Glenn Synders and Cameron Gibson of 3:31.58 still remains also.
