= Boipelo Makhothi =

Basotho swimmer (born 1986)

Personal information
- Full name: Boipelo Makhothi
- Nationality: Basotho
- Born: 23 February 1986 (age 40)

Sport
- Sport: Swimming
- Strokes: backstroke, breaststroke, freestyle
- Updated on 14 January 2014

Boipelo Makhothi (born 23 February 1986) is a Basotho swimmer.

== Career ==
Mokhesi first competed for Lesotho at the 2007 World Championships in Melbourne where he finished 89th in the 100 metre backstroke in 1:32.14, 96th in the 50 metre backstroke in 40.72, 114th in the 100 metre breaststroke in 1:32.63, 121st in the 50 metre breaststroke in 41.91, 168th in the 50 metre freestyle in 32.29, 168th in the 100 metre freestyle in 1:17.17, and with Thabiso Baholo, Lehlohonolo Moromella and Seele Benjamin Ntai finished 29th in the 4 × 100 metre freestyle relay in 5:42.96.

At the 2008 Swimming World Cup event in Durban, Makhothi finished 29th in the 50 metre freestyle in 32.34. The following year at the 2009 Swimming World Cup event in Durban, Makhothi finished 26th in the 100 metre breaststroke in 1:33.30, 26th in the 50 metre breaststroke in 42.91, 37th in the 50 metre freestyle in 33.14, 39th in the 100 metre freestyle in 1:15.69. and was disqualified in the 50 metre backstroke.

At the 2010 Commonwealth Games in Delhi, Mokhesi finished 27th in the 50 metre breaststroke in 45.64, 30th in the 100 metre breaststroke in 1:39.60, 47th in the 100 metre freestyle in 1:14.95 and 57th in the 50 metre freestyle in 32.50.
