= Seele Benjamin Ntai =

Basotho swimmer (born 1985)

Personal information
- Full name: Seele Benjamin Ntai
- Nationality: Basotho
- Born: 1985 (age 40–41)

Sport
- Sport: Swimming
- Strokes: breaststroke, freestyle
- Updated on 14 January 2014

Seele Benjamin Ntai (born 1985) is a Basotho swimmer.

== Career ==
Ntai first competed for Lesotho at the 2007 World Championships in Melbourne where he finished 113th in the 100 metre breaststroke in 1:31.58 and with Thabiso Baholo, Lehlohonolo Moromella and Boipelo Makhothi finished 29th in the 4 × 100 metre freestyle relay in 5:42.96. Four years later at the 2011 World Championships in Shanghai, Ntai finished 111th in the 50 metre freestyle in 32.74.
