= Thabiso Baholo =

Basotho swimmer

Personal information
- Full name: Thabiso Baholo
- Nationality: Basotho
- Born: 21 February 1990 (age 36)

Sport
- Sport: Swimming
- Strokes: backstroke, breaststroke, freestyle
- Updated on 14 January 2014

Thabiso Baholo (born 21 February 1990) is a Basotho swimmer.

== Career ==
Baholo first competed for Lesotho at the 2007 World Championships in Melbourne where he finished 97th in the 50 metre backstroke in 43.67, 169th in the 100 metre freestyle in 1:22.04 and with Boipelo Makhothi, Lehlohonolo Moromella and Seele Benjamin Ntai finished 29th in the 4 × 100 metre freestyle relay in 5:42.96.

At the 2008 Commonwealth Youth Games in Pune, India, Baholo finished 21st in the 50 metre breaststroke in 42.38, 37th in the 100 metre freestyle in 1:22.62 and was disqualified in the 50 metre freestyle.
