= Lehlohonolo Moromella =

Basotho swimmer (born 1985)

Personal information
- Full name: Lehlohonolo Moromella
- Nationality: Basotho
- Born: 1985 (age 40–41)

Sport
- Sport: Swimming
- Strokes: breaststroke, freestyle
- Updated on 14 January 2014

Lehlohonolo Moromella (born 1985) is a Basotho swimmer.

== Career ==
Moromella competed for Lesotho at the 2007 World Championships in Melbourne where he finished 122nd in the 50 metre breaststroke in 42.93, 175th in the 50 metre freestyle in 38.06 and with Thabiso Baholo, Boipelo Makhothi and Seele Benjamin Ntai finished 29th in the 4 × 100 metre freestyle relay in 5:42.96.
