= Junya Koga =

Japanese swimmer (born 1987)

Personal information
- Full name: Junya Koga
- Nationality: Japan
- Born: July 19, 1987 (age 38) Kumagaya, Saitama Prefecture, Japan
- Height: 1.81 m (5 ft 11 in)

Sport
- Sport: Swimming
- Strokes: Backstroke
Medal record
Men's swimming
World Championships (LC)
| Gold medal – first place | 2009 Rome | 100 m backstroke |
| Silver medal – second place | 2009 Rome | 50 m backstroke |
| Silver medal – second place | 2017 Budapest | 50 m backstroke |
World Championships (SC)
| Gold medal – first place | 2016 Windsor | 50 m backstroke |
| Bronze medal – third place | 2016 Windsor | 4x50 m freestyle |
| Bronze medal – third place | 2016 Windsor | 4x100 m medley |
| Bronze medal – third place | 2016 Windsor | 4x50 m mixed medley |
Asian Games
| Gold medal – first place | 2006 Doha | 50 m backstroke |
| Gold medal – first place | 2010 Guangzhou | 50 m backstroke |
| Gold medal – first place | 2014 Incheon | 50 m backstroke |
| Silver medal – second place | 2010 Guangzhou | 100 m backstroke |
Pan Pacific Championships
| Gold medal – first place | 2010 Irvine | 50 m backstroke |
| Silver medal – second place | 2010 Irvine | 100 m backstroke |
| Silver medal – second place | 2010 Irvine | 4×100 m medley |
Universiade
| Gold medal – first place | 2009 Belgrade | 50 m backstroke |
| Silver medal – second place | 2007 Bangkok | 50 m backstroke |
| Bronze medal – third place | 2009 Belgrade | 100 m backstroke |

Junya Koga (古賀 淳也, Koga Junya; born July 19, 1987) is a Japanese backstroke swimmer. He is a Waseda University student in Tokyo.

In May 2009, he set the Japanese records in the 50 m and 100 m backstrokes at the 2009 Japan Championships, qualifying for Japan's team to the 2009 World Championships.

== Personal bests ==
In long course

- 50m backstroke 24.24 Asian record (August 1, 2009)
- 100m backstroke 52.26 (July 28, 2009)
