= Kirk Palmer =

Australian swimmer

Personal information
- Full name: Kirk Palmer
- National team: Australia
- Born: 12 October 1986 (age 39) Central Coast (New South Wales)
- Height: 1.94 m (6 ft 4 in)
- Weight: 87 kg (192 lb)

Sport
- Sport: Swimming
- Strokes: Freestyle
- Club: Barker Aquatic Swim Club
Medal record
Men's swimming
Representing Australia
Olympic Games
Bronze medal – third place	2008 Beijing	4×200 m freestyle
World Championships (LC)
Bronze medal – third place	2009 Rome	4×200 m freestyle
World Championships (SC)
Gold medal – first place	2008 Manchester	4×200 m freestyle
Silver medal – second place	2008 Manchester	200 m freestyle

Kirk Palmer (born 12 October 1986) is an Australian freestyle swimmer and an Australian Institute of Sport scholarship holder.

He was selected in the squad for the 4×200-metre freestyle relay for the 2008 Summer Olympics in Beijing. He helped Australia qualify sixth in the heats, but was dropped from the finals quartet to make way for Grant Hackett and Patrick Murphy. Australia took the bronze medal for its third-place finish in the final.

He was also a member of the Australian 4×200-metre freestyle relay team that broke the short course world record on 31 August 2007.

== See also ==
- List of Olympic medalists in swimming (men)
- World record progression 4 × 200 metres freestyle relay
