= Daniel Sliwinski =

British swimmer (born 1990)

Personal information
- Born: 4 April 1990 (age 36) Preston, England

Sport
- Country: Great Britain; England
- Sport: Swimming
- Event: Breaststroke
Medal record
Commonwealth Games
Representing England
Bronze medal – third place	2010 Delhi	4 × 100 m medley

Daniel Sliwinski (born 4 April 1990) is a British former breaststroke swimmer.

Sliwinski, born in Preston, began swimming at the age of five. He attended Bolton School and with his junior swimming accomplishments earned a full scholarship to Indiana University in the United States.

A Stockport ITC swimmer, Sliwinski won both the 50 and 100 metre breaststroke events at the 2008 Youth World Championships. In 2010 he was a member of England's bronze medal-winning 4 × 100 m medley relay team at the Delhi Commonwealth Games. He is a former British record holder in the 100 metre breaststroke. In 2012 he won the 100 metre breaststroke at the British Championships to earn a place on the London Olympic team, but had to withdraw a month before the games due to a shoulder tendon injury.
