= Grant Turner (swimmer) =

British swimmer

Personal information
- Born: 11 March 1989 (age 37) Swindon, Great Britain

Sport
- Sport: Swimming
Medal record
Representing England
Commonwealth Games
Silver medal – second place	2010 Delhi	4x100m freestyle relay

Grant James Turner (born 11 March 1989) is a British former swimmer. He competed for Great Britain in the 4 × 100 metre freestyle relay at the 2012 Summer Olympics.

Upon retirement from competitive swimming, Grant formed the Joanne Jackson Swim Academy with his partner Olympic swimmer Joanne Jackson. The Swim Academy offers the opportunity for all to develop their swimming skills with two former Olympic swimmers.
