= Eamon Sullivan =

Australian swimmer

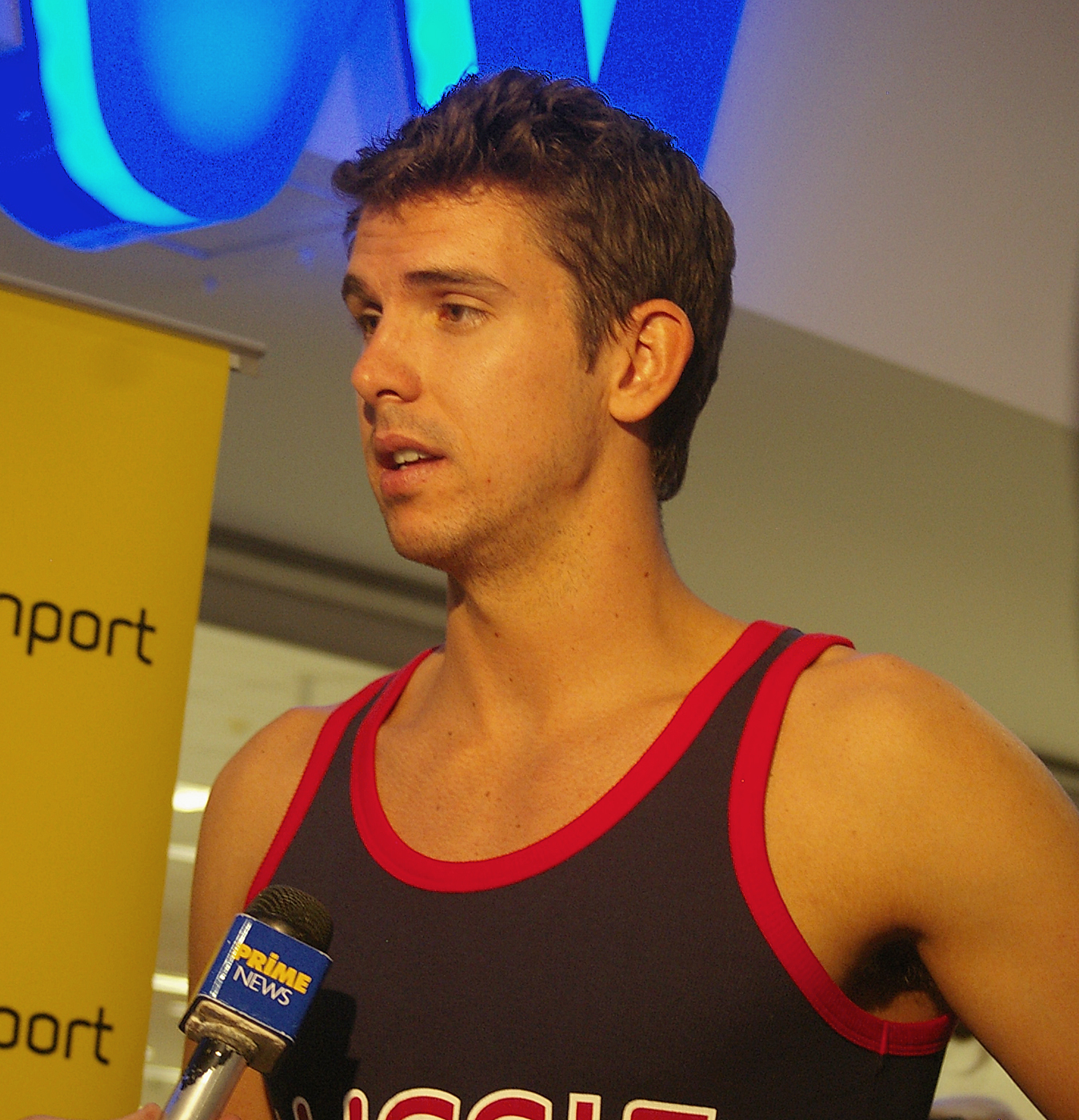
- Sullivan interviewed at Wagga Wagga

Personal information
- Full name: Eamon Wade Sullivan
- Nicknames: "Sullo"," Mondo", "Mad Dog"
- National team: Australia
- Born: 30 August 1985 (age 41) Perth, Western Australia
- Height: 1.89 m (6 ft 2 in)
- Weight: 78 kg (172 lb)

Sport
- Sport: Swimming
- Strokes: Freestyle
Medal record
Men's swimming
Representing Australia
Olympic Games
Silver medal – second place	2008 Beijing	100 m freestyle
Silver medal – second place	2008 Beijing	4×100 m medley
Bronze medal – third place	2008 Beijing	4×100 m freestyle
World Championships (LC)
Gold medal – first place	2007 Melbourne	4×100 m medley
Gold medal – first place	2011 Shanghai	4×100 m freestyle
Bronze medal – third place	2007 Melbourne	100 m freestyle
Pan Pacific Championships
Silver medal – second place	2010 Irvine	4×100 m freestyle
Bronze medal – third place	2006 Victoria	100 m freestyle
Bronze medal – third place	2006 Victoria	4×100 m medley
Bronze medal – third place	2006 Victoria	4×100 m freestyle
Commonwealth Games
Gold medal – first place	2006 Melbourne	4×100 m medley
Gold medal – first place	2010 Delhi	4×100 m freestyle
Gold medal – first place	2010 Delhi	4×100 m medley
Silver medal – second place	2006 Melbourne	4×100 m freestyle
Bronze medal – third place	2010 Delhi	100 m freestyle

Eamon Wade Sullivan (born 30 August 1985) is an Australian former sprint swimmer, three-time Olympic medallist, and former world record-holder in two events. He was also the winner of the first season of Celebrity MasterChef Australia, and followed up his swimming career with a number of food business ventures.

== Swimming career ==
=== 2004–2007 ===
At the 2004 Olympics in Athens, Sullivan competed in the 4 × 100 m freestyle relay. He split 49.19 on the second leg, putting Australia in fifth position at the 300 m mark. Australia ultimately finished sixth.

In March 2006, Sullivan competed at the Commonwealth Games in Melbourne. He split 48.21 on the second leg of the 4 × 100 m freestyle relay, with Australia winning the silver medal in an overall time of 3:15.54. On day four, he recorded a time of 49.57 to finish fourth in the 100 m freestyle. On the final day of competition, Sullivan swam the freestyle leg of the 4 × 100 m medley relay. Australia led for the entire race, with Sullivan anchoring in 48.15. Australia won the gold medal in a games record time of 3:34.37.

In December 2006, Sullivan competed at the Australian Championships in Brisbane to gain selection for the 2007 World Championships in Melbourne. He won the 100 m freestyle with a personal best time of 48.97. He then went 22.00 in the 50 m freestyle, breaking the Australian record of 22.07 set by Brett Hawke in 2004.

At the World Championships in Melbourne, Sullivan's first event was the 4 × 100 m freestyle relay. He led off in 48.88, with Australia ultimately finishing fifth in a time of 3:15.89. In the 100 m freestyle, Sullivan recorded a personal best of 48.47 to win the bronze medal, finishing 0.04 seconds behind Filippo Magnini and Brent Hayden, who dead-heated for the gold medal. Sullivan later finished fifth in the 50 m freestyle, recording a time of 22.05. His final event was the 4 × 100 m medley relay, an event where the favoured USA were disqualified during the heats. In the final, Sullivan split 47.89 on the freestyle leg, securing the gold medal for Australia in an overall time of 3:34.93.

=== 2008 ===
In February, Sullivan competed at the New South Wales Championships in Sydney. He went 21.56 in the 50 m freestyle, breaking Aleksandr Popov's world record of 21.64 from 2000. On the same night, Sullivan swam in the 4 × 100 m freestyle relay, recording 48.11 on the first leg to break Michael Klim's Australian record of 48.18 from 2000. Sullivan's world record was later broken by Alain Bernard of France in March.

In March, Sullivan competed at the Australian Championships to gain Olympic qualification. In the 100 m freestyle, he went 47.55 in the semifinals to break the Australian record. His time was 0.05 seconds slower than the world record, which was also held by Bernard. In the final, Sullivan lowered his own national record to 47.52, again missing Bernard's mark. Sullivan later swam in the 50 m freestyle, going 21.41 in the semifinals to reclaim the world record. He broke it again in the final, recording 21.28.

At the Beijing Olympics, Sullivan competed in four events. First was the 4 × 100 m freestyle relay, where Sullivan swam the first leg. He recorded 47.24 to break Bernard's 100 m freestyle world record and give Australia an early lead. Australia eventually won the bronze medal in 3:09.91, being one of five nations to surpass the former relay world record. In the 100 m freestyle, Sullivan's world record was broken by Bernard in the first semifinal. Sullivan immediately reclaimed the mark, however, by going 47.05 in the second semifinal. In the final, Sullivan won the silver medal in 47.32, losing to Bernard by 0.11 seconds. Two days later, Sullivan came sixth in 50 m freestyle with a time of 21.65. His final event was the 4 × 100 m medley relay, where he split 46.65 on the freestyle leg to win the silver medal.

=== 2009–2014 ===
At the Australian Championships in Sydney, Sullivan won the 100 m freestyle in 48.34 and finished second in the 50 m freestyle in a time of 21.96, qualifying for the 2009 World Championships in both events. However, in July, Sullivan withdrew from the competition due to illness.

Sullivan competed at the 2010 Pan Pacific Championships in Irvine. He finished seventh in the 100 m freestyle with a time of 48.84. He then led off the 4 × 100 m freestyle relay, splitting 49.19. Australia won the silver medal in 3:14.30. He then competed in the 50 m freestyle, recording 22.50 to finish eleventh.

In October 2010, Sullivan competed at the Commonwealth Games in Delhi. He won the gold medal in the 4 × 100 m freestyle relay, splitting 47.49 on the second leg. Australia recorded 3:13.92 to break the games record. In the 100 m freestyle, Sullivan won the bronze medal in a time of 48.69. In the 50 m freestyle, he finished equal-fifth with Adam Brown, recording a time of 22.51. His final event was the 4 × 100 m medley relay. He swam the freestyle leg and secured the gold medal for Australia in a games record time of 3:33.15.

At the 2011 World Championships in Shanghai, Sullivan swam the anchor leg of the 4 × 100 m freestyle relay. He dove in with the lead and split 47.72 to hold off France by 0.14 seconds, winning the gold medal in 3:11.00.

At the 2012 Olympics in London, Sullivan competed in the 4 × 100 m freestyle relay. Australia was favoured to win the gold medal, as they were the reigning world champions in the event, and their lineup included, prior to the London Olympics, the two fastest 100 m freestylers in a textile suit. France won the gold medal in an upset victory and Australia finished fourth. After the conclusion of the Olympics, Sullivan, along with the other members of the Australian relay team, were investigated for stilnox use and "toxic" behaviour.

At the Australian Championships in Brisbane, Sullivan won the 50 m freestyle in 21.90, qualifying for the Commonwealth Games in Glasgow. However, in July, prior to Games' opening ceremony, Sullivan retired from swimming at the age of 28 due to injury.

== Television work ==
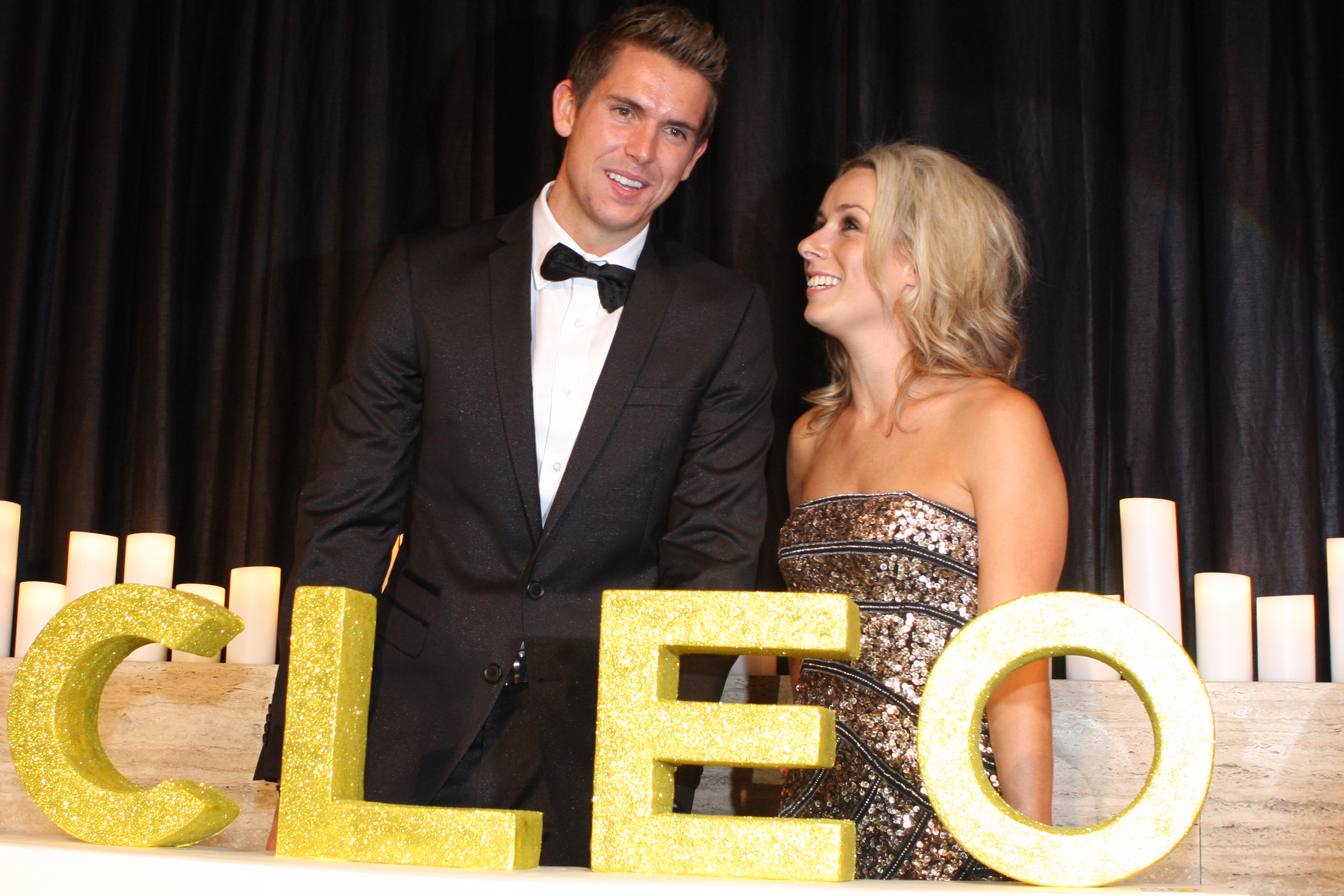
Eamon Sullivan awarded as Cleo's Bachelor of the Year 2011, with Cleo editor Gemma Crisp

In 2009, Sullivan won the first season of Celebrity MasterChef Australia beating Kirk Pengilly and Rachael Finch. In 2011, Sullivan competed in the third season of the Channel Seven television series Australia's Greatest Athlete. He also made a guest appearance in the third season of MasterChef Australia, cooking the Chocolate Délice dish that earned him the title of Celebrity MasterChef in 2009. In 2013, he became a team captain on the Australian version of the panel show A League of Their Own.

Sullivan competed in the fourteenth season of Dancing with the Stars, and was the fourth person eliminated.

== Business ventures ==
Sullivan had dreamt of owning a restaurant since taking home economics in high school. Following his retirement from swimming, Sullivan now manages several restaurants in and around Perth, in Western Australia.

In 2011, Sullivan opened a cafe in Subiaco called Louis Baxters, with Laki Baker, a producer on MasterChef Australia. Sullivan sold Louis Baxters in 2017. In March 2013, Sullivan opened Bib & Tucker, a beachside restaurant in North Fremantle. Sullivan co-owns the restaurant with pole vaulter Steve Hooker and field hockey player Jamie Dwyer. Scott Bridger is the executive chef at the restaurant.

In February 2015, Sullivan opened May Street Larder in East Fremantle. In April 2019, Bridger and Sullivan opened a second May Street Larder in Mount Hawthorn. The Mount Hawthorn location closed in January 2020. Bridger and Sullivan split the site and redeveloped it into two new venues: Sammy's, a sandwich bar, and Pogo, a Middle Eastern eatery.

In October 2018, in partnership with Andy Freeman and Bridger, Sullivan opened Goody Two's, a Japanese whiskey bar located at Hibernian Place in the Perth CBD.

== Personal life ==
Sullivan attended high school at John XXIII College in the Perth suburb of Mount Claremont.

In April 2016, Sullivan married Perth lawyer Naomi Bass. The couple have two children: a son born in July 2017 and a daughter born in August 2019.

== See also ==
- List of Commonwealth Games medallists in swimming (men)
- List of Olympic medalists in swimming (men)
- World record progression 50 metres freestyle
- World record progression 100 metres freestyle

Records
Preceded by Alexander Popov; Alain Bernard	Men's 50 metre freestyle world record holder (long course); 17 February 2008 – 23 March 2008; 27 March 2008 – 26 April 2009	Succeeded by Alain Bernard; Frédérick Bousquet
Preceded by Alain Bernard; Alain Bernard	Men's 100 metre freestyle world record holder (long course); 11 August 2008 – 13 August 2008; 13 August 2008 – 30 July 2009	Succeeded by Alain Bernard; César Cielo
