= Swimming at the 2010 Commonwealth Games – Men's 50 metre breaststroke =

The Men's 50 metre Breaststroke event at the 2010 Commonwealth Games took place on 7 and 8 October 2010, at the SPM Swimming Pool Complex.

Five heats were held, with most containing the maximum number of swimmers (eight). The top sixteen advanced to the semifinals and the top eight from there qualified for the finals.

== Heats summary ==
Rank	Heat	Lane	Name	Nationality	Time	Notes
1	4	5	Glenn Snyders	New Zealand	28.15	Q
2	4	4	Brenton Rickard	Australia	28.46	Q
3	2	5	Daniel Sliwinski	England	28.47	Q
4	2	3	Sandeep Sejwal	India	28.58	Q
5	2	4	Cameron van der Burgh	South Africa	28.73	Q
6	3	3	Amini Fonua	Tonga	28.90	Q
7	3	5	Christian Sprenger	Australia	28.94	Q
8	3	4	Scott Dickens	Canada	28.96	Q
9	4	3	Robert Holderness	Wales	29.01	Q
10	3	6	Michael Dawson	Northern Ireland	29.36	Q
11	4	6	Agnishwar Jayaprakash	India	29.66	Q
12	2	6	See Yap	Malaysia	29.92	Q
13	1	3	Puneet Rana	India	30.45	Q
14	3	2	Amar Shah	Kenya	31.14	Q
15	4	2	Richard Chng	Singapore	31.33	Q
16	2	2	Shajahan Ali	Bangladesh	31.36	Q

== Semifinals ==
=== Semifinal 1 ===
Rank	Lane	Name	Nationality	Time	Notes
1	4	Brenton Rickard	Australia	28.11	Q
2	6	Scott Dickens	Canada	28.35	Q
3	3	Amini Fonua	Tonga	28.73	Q
4	5	Sandeep Sejwal	India	28.82	
5	2	Michael Dawson	Northern Ireland	29.53	
6	7	See Yap	Malaysia	29.78	
7	1	Amar Shah	Kenya	30.53	NR
8	8	Shajahan Ali	Bangladesh	30.57	

=== Semifinal 2 ===
Rank	Lane	Name	Nationality	Time	Notes
1	3	Cameron van der Burgh	South Africa	27.86	Q
1	4	Glenn Snyders	New Zealand	27.86	Q
3	6	Christian Sprenger	Australia	28.10	Q
4	5	Daniel Sliwinski	England	28.53	Q
5	2	Robert Holderness	Wales	28.74	Q
6	7	Agnishwar Jayaprakash	India	28.74	
7	1	Puneet Rana	India	30.12	
8	8	Lijie Chng	Singapore	31.03	

== Final ==
Rank	Lane	Name	Nationality	Time	Notes
1st place, gold medalist(s)	4	Cameron van der Burgh	South Africa	27.18	CG
2nd place, silver medalist(s)	5	Glenn Snyders	New Zealand	27.67	
2nd place, silver medalist(s)	6	Brenton Rickard	Australia	27.67	
4	3	Christian Sprenger	Australia	27.87	
5	2	Scott Dickens	Canada	28.07	
6	7	Daniel Sliwinski	England	28.12	
7	1	Amini Fonua	Tonga	28.69	
8	8	Sandeep Sejwal	India	28.85	
