= Richard Hortness =

Canadian swimmer (born 1985)

Personal information
- Full name: Richard Aaron Hortness
- National team: Canada
- Born: 23 May 1985 (age 41) London, Ontario
- Height: 1.91 m (6 ft 3 in)
- Weight: 86 kg (190 lb)

Sport
- Sport: Swimming
- Strokes: Freestyle
- Club: London Aquatic Club
- College team: University of Nevada, Las Vegas

Richard Aaron Hortness (born 23 May 1985) is a Canadian former competition swimmer. He swam in the 50-metre freestyle at the 2008 Summer Olympics in Beijing, China, and was part of the Canadian 4 × 100 m freestyle team at the 2012 Summer Olympics in London. He currently teaches at South Delta Secondary School in Tsawwassen, Delta, Canada.
