= 2010 Australian Short Course Swimming Championships =

Coordinates: 27.5110°S 153.1475°E

The 2010 Australian Short Course Swimming Championships were held at the Brisbane Aquatic Centre from Wednesday 14 July to Sunday 18 July. They were organised by Swimming Australia and sponsored by Telstra.

The events were spread over five days of competition featuring heats in the morning, with semifinals and finals in the evening session. The format of the meet consisted of heats for all individual events with semifinals in the 50 and 100 m individual events. The 200 and 400 m events consisted of A and B finals with no semifinals whilst the 800 and 1500 m freestyle and relay events consisted of timed finals only.

== Medal winners ==
=== Men's events ===
Event	Gold		Silver		Bronze	
50 m freestyle	Kyle Richardson; Chandler (Qld)	21.62	Matthew Abood; Sydney University (NSW)	21.75	Cameron Prosser; Melbourne Vicentre (Vic)	21.88
100 m freestyle	Matthew Abood; Sydney University (NSW)	47.07	Kyle Richardson; Chandler (Qld)	47.57	Tommaso D'Orsogna; West Coast (WA)	47.63
200 m freestyle	Nicholas Ffrost; Southport Olympic (Qld)	1:45.12	Tommaso D'Orsogna; West Coast (WA)	1:45.22	Kyle Richardson; Chandler (Qld)	1:45.50
400 m freestyle	Robert Hurley; Wests Illawarra (NSW)	3:41.58	Patrick Murphy; Melbourne Vicentre (Vic)	3:42.02	Thomas Fraser-Holmes; Hunter (NSW)	3:43.38
800 m freestyle	Travis Nederpelt; City of Perth (WA)	7:51.89	Wally Eggleton; Blacktown City (NSW)	7:53.74	Theodore Pasialis; Unattached (NSW)	7:57.33
1500 m freestyle	Patrick Murphy; Melbourne Vicentre (Vic)	15:00.63	Shane Asbury; Nunawading (Vic)	15:15.48	George O'Brien; Pro-Ma Miami (Qld)	15:18.50
50 m backstroke	Benjamin Treffers; Burley Griffin (ACT)	23.81	Ashley Delaney; Nunawading (Vic)	24.17	Daniel Arnamnart; Aquaburn (NSW)	24.24
100 m backstroke	Ashley Delaney; Nunawading (Vic)	51.41	Hayden Stoeckel; Norwood (SA)	51.81	Daniel Arnamnart; Aquaburn (NSW)	52.14
200 m backstroke	Ashley Delaney; Nunawading (Vic)	1:52.25	Braiden Camm; Redlands (Qld)	1:53.97	Mitch Larkin; St. Peters Western (Qld)	1:54.63
50 m breaststroke	Brenton Rickard; Southport Olympic (Qld)	27.26	Christian Sprenger; Chandler (Qld)	27.40	Brad Morrison; Castle Hill RSL (NSW)	27.76
100 m breaststroke	Christian Sprenger; Chandler (Qld)	58.75	Brenton Rickard; Southport Olympic (Qld)	59.14	Kenneth To; Trinity Grammar (NSW)	59.70
200 m breaststroke	Christian Sprenger; Chandler (Qld)	2:06.47	Brenton Rickard; Southport Olympic (Qld)	2:06.77	Craig Calder; Albury (NSW)	2:07.28
50 m butterfly	Geoff Huegill; SOPAC (NSW)	22.95	Chris Wright; Chandler (Qld)	23.39	Adam Pine; Ginninderra (ACT)	23.45
100 m butterfly	Chris Wright; Chandler (Qld)	51.17	Daniel Lester; Albany Creek (Qld)	51.71	Adam Pine; Ginninderra (ACT)	51.82
200 m butterfly	Chris Wright; Chandler (Qld)	1:51.74	Jayden Hadler; Chandler (Qld)	1:53.10	Lachlan Staples; Kingswim (NSW)	1:55.14
100 m individual medley	Kenneth To; Trinity Grammar (NSW)	52.39	Tommaso D'Orsogna; West Coast (WA)	53.06	John Goo; Ryde-Carlile (NSW)	54.54
200 m individual medley	Tommaso D'Orsogna; West Coast (WA)	1:55.92	Kenneth To; Trinity Grammar (NSW)	1:56.40	Jayden Hadler; Chandler (Qld)	1:57.02
400 m individual medley	Jayden Hadler; Chandler (Qld)	4:07.06	Thomas Fraser-Holmes; Hunter (NSW)	4:07.50	Daniel Tranter; Liverpool (NSW)	4:09.29
4 × 100 m freestyle relay	Melbourne Vicentre A Patrick Murphy; Lloyd Townsing; Justin Griggs; Cameron Prosser	3:15.84	Chandler A Jayden Hadler; Kyle Richardson; Christian Sprenger; Chris Wright	3:15.94	St. Peters Western A Leith Brodie; Ned McKendry; Ryan Napoleon; Kenrick Monk	3:16.01
4 × 200 m freestyle relay	St Peters Western A Ned McKendry; Ryan Napoleon; Leith Brodie; Kenrick Monk	7:07.87	Chandler A Chris Wright; Kyle Richardson; Michael Jackson; Jayden Hadler	7:11.62	Nunawading A Travis Mahoney; Jeremy Saunders; Adam Parslow; Shane Asbury	7:17.31
4 × 100 m medley relay	Chandler A Michael Jackson (53.03); Christian Sprenger (59.07); Chris Wright (51.80); Kyle Richardson (47.45)	3:31.35	Melbourne Vicentre A Daniel Blackborrow (53.79); Daniel Crook (1:00.88); Justin Griggs (54.08); Cameron Prosser (47.15)	3:15.84	Nunawading A Ashley Delaney (52.11); Nicholas D'Arcy-Evans (1:02.34); Sam Ashby (52.33); Jeremy Saunders (49.16)	3:35.94

Legend: WR – World record; CR – Commonwealth record; OR – Oceanian record; AR – Australian record; ACR – Australian All Comers record; Club – Australian Club record

=== Women's events ===
Event	Gold		Silver		Bronze	
50 m freestyle	Yolane Kukla; St. Peters Western (Qld)	24.14	Marieke Guehrer; Melbourne Vicentre (Vic)	24.67	Emma McKeon; Wests Illawarra (NSW)	24.73
100 m freestyle	Emily Seebohm; Brothers (Qld)	53.16	Emma McKeon; Wests Illawarra (NSW)	53.37	Felicity Galvez; SOPAC (NSW)	53.51
200 m freestyle	Bronte Barratt; Albany Creek (Qld)	1:54.83	Blair Evans; City of Perth (WA)	1:55.06	Kylie Palmer; Chandler (Qld)	1:55.55
400 m freestyle	Kylie Palmer; Chandler (Qld)	3:59.92; ACR	Katie Goldman; Pro-Ma Miami (Qld)	4:00.64	Blair Evans; City of Perth (WA)	4:00.71
800 m freestyle	Katie Goldman; Pro-Ma Miami (Qld)	8:12.65; ACR	Blair Evans; City of Perth (WA)	8:14.86	Jessica Ashwood; Unattached (NSW)	8:22.06
1500 m freestyle	Jessica Ashwood; Unattached (NSW)	16:12.64	Erin Killey; Hunter (NSW)	16:14.86	Belinda Bennett; Nunawading (Vic)	16:31.49
50 m backstroke	Marieke Guehrer; Melbourne Vicentre (Vic)	26.81; ACR	Emily Seebohm; Brothers (Qld)	26.82	Rachel Goh; Melbourne Vicentre (Vic)	27.15
100 m backstroke	Emily Seebohm; Brothers (Qld)	56.58; AR	Belinda Hocking; Albury (NSW)	57.67	Rachel Goh; Melbourne Vicentre (Vic); Marieke Guehrer; Melbourne Vicentre (Vic)	58.00
200 m backstroke	Belinda Hocking; Albury (NSW)	2:03.47	Meagen Nay; St. Peters Western (Qld)	2:05.88	Mikkayla Maselli-Sheridan; Chandler (Qld)	2:07.48
50 m breaststroke	Leiston Pickett; Southport Olympic (Qld)	30.37	Sarah Katsoulis; Nunawading (Vic)	30.77	Sara Marson; Twin Towns (NSW)	31.18
100 m breaststroke	Leisel Jones; Nunawading (Vic)	1:03.63; ACR	Sarah Katsoulis; Nunawading (Vic)	1:06.14	Leiston Pickett; Southport Olympic (Qld)	1:06.59
200 m breaststroke	Leisel Jones; Nunawading (Vic)	2:18.86	Tessa Wallace; Pelican Waters (Qld)	2.21.48	Rebecca Kemp; Mackay (Qld)	2:22.45
50 m butterfly	Felicity Galvez; SOPAC (NSW)	25.65	Yolane Kukla; St. Peters Western (Qld)	25.91	Alicia Coutts; Redlands (Qld)	26.12
100 m butterfly	Felicity Galvez; SOPAC (NSW)	56.34	Madeline Groves; St. Peters Western (Qld)	58.94	Samantha Hamill; Kawana Waters (Qld)	59.02
200 m butterfly	Felicity Galvez; SOPAC (NSW)	2:04.76	Samantha Hamill; Kawana Waters (Qld)	2:06.18	Jessicah Schipper; Chandler (Qld)	2:07.12
100 m individual medley	Emily Seebohm; Brothers (Qld)	59.29	Tessa Wallace; Pelican Waters (Qld)	1:00.36	Chelsea Carpenter; Nunawading (Vic)	1:01.43
200 m individual medley	Emily Seebohm; Brothers (Qld)	2:07.64; AR	Kotuku Ngawati; Melbourne Vicentre (Vic)	2:07.76	Tiffany Papaemanouil; Pro-Ma Miami (QLD)	2:10.40
400 m individual medley	Samantha Hamill; Kawana Waters (QLD)	4:32.58	Amy Levings; Pro-Ma Miami (QLD)	4:36.27	Mikkayla Maselli-Sheridan; Chandler (QLD)	4:36.29
4 × 100 m freestyle relay	Chandler A Rebecca Ohlwein (55.49); Alice Mills (54.15); Kylie Palmer (54.21); Mikkayla Maselli-Sheridan (54.21)	3:38.06	St. Peters Western A Amelia Evatt-Davey (55.19); Yolane Kukla (54.26); Meagen Nay (54.78); Amy Allen (55.02)	3:39.25	Melbourne Vicentre A Marieke Guehrer (55.68); Kotuku Ngawati (54.31); Jessica Morrison (55.47); Rachel Goh (54.89)	3:40.35
4 × 200 m freestyle relay	St. Peters Western A Amy Allen; Yolane Kukla; Amy Smith; Meagen Nay	7:59.02	Nunawading A Belinda Parslow; Ellese Zalewski; Chelsea Carpenter; Belinda Bennett	8:03.04	Brothers A Darthea Clydsdale; Sarah Pullen; Aisling Scott; Emily Seebohm	8:05.46
4 × 100 m medley relay	Melbourne Vicentre A Rachel Goh; Emily Selig; Marieke Guehrer; Jessica Morrison	4:00.72	Nunawading A Tayliah Zimmer; Leisel Jones; Ellese Zalewski; Belinda Parslow	4:01.61	Cranbrook Eastern Edge; Hayley White; Samantha Marshall; Nicole Mee; Jessie Glew	4:04.23

Legend: WR – World record; CR – Commonwealth record; OR – Oceanian record; AR – Australian record; ACR – Australian All Comers record; Club – Australian Club record

== See also ==
- 2010 in swimming
- 2010 Australian Swimming Championships
