= List of Australian records in swimming =

There are two types of Australian records in swimming as ratified by Swimming Australia:

- Australian record: The best time recorded anywhere in the world by a swimmer or team holding Australian citizenship.
- Australian Allcomers record: The best time recorded in Australia by a swimmer or team.

== Australian records ==
=== Long course (50 metres) ===
==== Men ====
Event	Time		Name	Club	Date	Meet	Location	Ref
50 m freestyle	20.88	WR	Cameron McEvoy	Australia	20 March 2026	China Open	Shenzhen, China	
100 m freestyle	47.04	CR	Cameron McEvoy	Bond University	11 April 2016	Australian Championships	Adelaide, Australia	
200 m freestyle	1:44.06	CR	Ian Thorpe	Australia	25 July 2001	World Championships	Fukuoka, Japan	
400 m freestyle	3:40.08	CR	Ian Thorpe	Australia	30 July 2002	Commonwealth Games	Manchester, United Kingdom	
800 m freestyle	7:36.73	CR	Samuel Short	Rackley	10 June 2026	Australian Trials	Sydney, Australia	
1500 m freestyle	14:34.56	CR	Grant Hackett	Australia	29 July 2001	World Championships	Fukuoka, Japan	
1500 m freestyle	14:33.97	CR, #	Samuel Short	Australia	15 August 2026	Pan Pacific Championships	Irvine, United States	
50 m backstroke	24.12	sf, OC	Isaac Cooper	Australia	17 February 2024	World Championships	Doha, Qatar	
100 m backstroke	52.11	OC	Mitch Larkin	Australia	6 November 2015	World Cup	Dubai, United Arab Emirates	
200 m backstroke	1:53.17	CR	Mitch Larkin	Australia	7 November 2015	World Cup	Dubai, United Arab Emirates	
50 m breaststroke	26.32	OC	Samuel Williamson	Australia	14 February 2024	World Championships	Doha, Qatar	
100 m breaststroke	58.58	OC	Brenton Rickard	Australia	27 July 2009	World Championships	Rome, Italy	
200 m breaststroke	2:05.95	CR	Zac Stubblety-Cook	Chandler	19 May 2022	Australian Championships	Adelaide, Australia	
50 m butterfly	22.73	=, =OC	Matt Targett	Australia	27 July 2009	World Championships	Rome, Italy	
50 m butterfly	22.73	=, =OC, #	Kyle Chalmers	Australia	29 July 2026	Commonwealth Games	Glasgow, United Kingdom	
50 m butterfly	22.73	=, =OC, #	Ben Armbruster	Australia	29 July 2026	Commonwealth Games	Glasgow, United Kingdom	
100 m butterfly	50.25	OC	Matthew Temple	Australia	3 December 2023	Japan Open	Tokyo, Japan	
200 m butterfly	1:54.17		Harrison Turner	Australia	30 July 2025	World Championships	Singapore, Singapore	
200 m individual medley	1:55.72	OC	Mitch Larkin	St Peters Western	12 June 2019	Australian Trials	Brisbane, Australia	
400 m individual medley	4:09.27	h	Brendon Smith	Australia	24 July 2021	Olympic Games	Tokyo, Japan	
400 m individual medley	4:09.24	#	William Petric	Australia	13 August 2026	Pan Pacific Championships	Irvine, United States	
4 × 100 m freestyle relay	3:08.97	CR	Flynn Southam (47.77); Kai Taylor (47.04); Maximillian Giuliani (47.63); Kyle Chalmers (46.53)	Australia	27 July 2025 (Note: by official result source; 27 August 2025 by Swimming Australia source, a typo)	World Championships	Singapore, Singapore	
4 × 200 m freestyle relay	7:00.85	OC	Clyde Lewis (1:45.58); Kyle Chalmers (1:45.37); Alexander Graham (1:45.05); Mack Horton (1:44.85)	Australia	26 July 2019	World Championships	Gwangju, South Korea	
4 × 100 m medley relay	3:28.64	OC	Ashley Delaney (53.10); Brenton Rickard (57.80); Andrew Lauterstein (50.58); Matt Targett (47.16)	Australia	2 August 2009	World Championships	Rome, Italy	

Legend: # – Record awaiting ratification by Swimming Australia; WR – World record; OC – Oceanian record; CR – Commonwealth record; e – equalled existing record;
Records not set in finals: h – heat; sf – semifinal; r – relay 1st leg; rh – relay heat 1st leg; b – B final; † – en route to final mark; so – swim-off; tt – time trial

==== Women ====
Event	Time		Name	Club	Date	Meet	Location	Ref
50 m freestyle	23.78	CR	Cate Campbell	Australia	7 April 2018	Commonwealth Games	Gold Coast, Australia	
100 m freestyle	51.96	CR	Emma McKeon	Australia	30 July 2021	Olympic Games	Tokyo, Japan	
200 m freestyle	1:52.23	WR	Ariarne Titmus	St Peters Western	12 June 2024	Australian Trials	Brisbane, Australia	
400 m freestyle	3:55.38	OC	Ariarne Titmus	Australia	23 July 2023	World Championships	Fukuoka, Japan	
800 m freestyle	8:05.98	OC	Lani Pallister	Australia	2 August 2025	World Championships	Singapore, Singapore	
1500 m freestyle	15:39.14	CR	Lani Pallister	St Peters Western	14 June 2025	Australian Trials	Adelaide, Australia	
1500m freestyle	15:38.62	CR, #	Lani Pallister	Australia	12 August 2026	Pan Pacific Championships	Irvine, United States	
50m backstroke	26.86	WR	Kaylee McKeown	Australia	20 October 2023	World Cup	Budapest, Hungary	
100m backstroke	57.16	CR	Kaylee McKeown	Australia	29 July 2025	World Championships	Singapore, Singapore	
200m backstroke	2:03.14	WR	Kaylee McKeown	Griffith University	10 March 2023	NSW State Championships	Sydney, Australia	
50m breaststroke	30.05	OC	Chelsea Hodges	Australia	30 July 2022	Commonwealth Games	Birmingham, United Kingdom	
100m breaststroke	1:05.09	OC	Leisel Jones	Australia	20 March 2006	Commonwealth Games	Melbourne, Australia	
200m breaststroke	2:20.54	OC	Leisel Jones	Commercial	1 February 2006	Australian Championships	Melbourne, Australia	
50m butterfly	25.31	=, OC	Holly Barratt	Australia	16 August 2019	World Cup	Singapore, Singapore	
50m butterfly	25.31	=, OC	Alexandria Perkins	Australia	1 August 2025	World Championships	Singapore, Singapore	
100m butterfly	55.72	OC	Emma McKeon	Australia	26 July 2021	Olympic Games	Tokyo, Japan	
200m butterfly	2:03.41	OC	Jessicah Schipper	Australia	30 July 2009	World Championships	Rome, Italy	
200m individual medley	2:06.63	OC	Kaylee McKeown	Griffith University	10 June 2024	Australian Trials	Brisbane, Australia	
400m individual medley	4:28.22	OC	Kaylee McKeown	Griffith University	18 April 2024	Australian Championships	Gold Coast, Australia	
4 × 100 m freestyle relay	3:27.96	WR	Mollie O'Callaghan (52.08); Shayna Jack (51.69); Meg Harris (52.29); Emma McKeon (51.90)	Australia	23 July 2023	World Championships	Fukuoka, Japan	
4×200m freestyle relay	7:37.50	WR	Mollie O'Callaghan (1:53.66); Shayna Jack (1:55.63); Brianna Throssell (1:55.80); Ariarne Titmus (1:52.41)	Australia	27 July 2023	World Championships	Fukuoka, Japan	
4 × 100 m medley relay	3:51.60	CR	Kaylee McKeown (58.01); Chelsea Hodges (1:05.57); Emma McKeon (55.91); Cate Campbell (52.11)	Australia	1 August 2021	Olympic Games	Tokyo, Japan	

Legend: # – Record awaiting ratification by Swimming Australia; WR – World record; OC – Oceanian record; CR – Commonwealth record; e – equalled existing record;
Records not set in finals: h – heat; sf – semifinal; r – relay 1st leg; rh – relay heat 1st leg; b – B final; † – en route to final mark; so – swim-off; tt – time trial

==== Mixed relay ====
Event	Time		Name	Club	Date	Meet	Location	Ref
4 × 100 m freestyle relay	3:18.83	CR	Jack Cartwright (48.14); Kyle Chalmers (47.25); Shayna Jack (51.73); Mollie O'Callaghan (51.71)	Australia	29 July 2023	World Championships	Fukuoka, Japan	
4 × 100 m medley relay	3:38.76	OC	Kaylee McKeown (57.90); Joshua Yong (58.43); Matthew Temple (50.42); Mollie O'Callaghan (52.01)	Australia	3 August 2024	Olympic Games	Paris, France	

Legend: # – Record awaiting ratification by Swimming Australia; WR – World record; OC – Oceanian record; CR – Commonwealth record; e – equalled existing record;
Records not set in finals: h – heat; so – swim-off

=== Short course (25 metres) ===
==== Men ====
Event	Time		Name	Club	Date	Meet	Location	Ref
50m freestyle	20.68	=, OC	Kyle Chalmers	Australia	28 October 2021	World Cup	Kazan, Russia	
50m freestyle	20.68	=, OC	Isaac Cooper	St Andrew's	2 October 2026	Australian Championships	Sydney, Australia	
50m freestyle	20.13	OC, #	Cameron McEvoy	Australia	8 October 2026	World Cup	Tashkent, Uzbekistan	
100m freestyle	44.84	WR	Kyle Chalmers	Australia	29 October 2021	World Cup	Kazan, Russia	
200m freestyle	1:40.16	OC	Edward Sommerville	Brisbane Grammar	29 September 2026	Australian Championships	Sydney, Australia	
400m freestyle	3:34.58	OC	Grant Hackett	Miami	18 July 2002	2nd Australian Grand Prix	Sydney, Australia	
800m freestyle	7:23.42	CR	Grant Hackett	Melbourne Vicentre	20 July 2008	Victorian Championships	Melbourne, Australia	
1500m freestyle	14:10.10	CR	Grant Hackett	Miami	7 August 2001	Australian Championships	Perth, Australia	
50m backstroke	22.49	CR	Isaac Cooper	Australia	13 December 2024	World Championships	Budapest, Hungary	
100m backstroke	49.03	r, CR	Mitch Larkin	St Peters Western	28 November 2015	Australian Championships	Sydney, Australia	
200m backstroke	1:45.63	WR	Mitch Larkin	St Peters Western	27 November 2015	Australian Championships	Sydney, Australia	
50m breaststroke	26.02	OC	Grayson Bell	Somerville House	27 September 2024	Australian Championships	Adelaide, Australia	
100m breaststroke	56.61	OC	Joshua Collett	Bond	29 September 2026	Australian Championships	Sydney, Australia	
200m breaststroke	2:01.98	OC	Christian Sprenger	Commercial	10 August 2009	Australian Championships	Hobart, Australia	
200m breaststroke	2:01.67	OC, not ratified	Joshua Yong	Australia	20 October 2024	World Cup	Shanghai, China	
50m butterfly	21.90	OC	Ben Armbruster	Bond	29 September 2026	Australian Championships	Sydney, Australia	
100m butterfly	48.62	tt, OC	Matthew Temple	Marion	13 December 2023	SASI Time Trial	Adelaide, Australia	
200m butterfly	1:51.11		Chris Wright	Commercial	12 August 2009	Australian Championships	Hobart, Australia	
100m individual medley	51.19	OC	Kenneth To	Australia	20 October 2013	World Cup	Doha, Qatar	
200m individual medley	1:52.01	OC	Kenneth To	Australia	11 August 2013	World Cup	Berlin, Germany	
400m individual medley	3:57.91	CR	Thomas Fraser-Holmes	Miami	28 November 2015	Australian Championships	Sydney, Australia	
4 × 50 m freestyle relay	1:23.44	CR	Isaac Cooper (21.25); Matthew Temple (20.75); Flynn Southam (21.10); Kyle Chalmers (20.34)	Australia	15 December 2022	World Championships	Melbourne, Australia	
4 × 100 m freestyle relay	3:05.76		Maximillian Giuliani (46.62); Edward Sommerville (47.34); Harrison Turner (46.20); Matthew Temple (45.60)	Australia	10 December 2024 (Note: by official result source; 11 December 2024 by Swimming Australia source, a typo)	World Championships	Budapest, Hungary	
4 × 100 m freestyle relay	3:04.63	CR, not ratified	Flynn Southam (47.04); Matthew Temple (46.06); Thomas Neill (46.55); Kyle Chalmers (44.98)	Australia	13 December 2022	World Championships	Melbourne, Australia	
4 × 200 m freestyle relay	6:45.54	CR	Maximillian Giuliani (1:40.73); Edward Sommerville (1:41.03); Harrison Turner (1:42.21); Elijah Winnington (1:41.57)	Australia	13 December 2024 (Note: by official result source; 14 December 2024 by Swimming Australia source, a typo)	World Championships	Budapest, Hungary	
4 × 50 m medley relay	1:30.81	CR	Isaac Cooper (22.66); Grayson Bell (25.92); Matthew Temple (21.75); Kyle Chalmers (20.48)	Australia	17 December 2022	World Championships	Melbourne, Australia	
4 × 100 m medley relay	3:18.98	CR	Isaac Cooper (49.46); Joshua Yong (56.55); Matthew Temple (48.34); Kyle Chalmers (44.63)	Australia	18 December 2022	World Championships	Melbourne, Australia	

Legend: # – Record awaiting ratification by Swimming Australia; WR – World record; OC – Oceanian record; CR – Commonwealth record; e – equalled existing record;
Records not set in finals: h – heat; sf – semifinal; r – relay 1st leg; rh – relay heat 1st leg; b – B final; † – en route to final mark; so – swim-off; tt – time trial

==== Women ====
Event	Time		Name	Club	Date	Meet	Location	Ref
50m freestyle	23.04	CR	Emma McKeon	Australia	17 December 2022	World Championships	Melbourne, Australia	
100m freestyle	50.25	CR	Cate Campbell	Commercial	26 October 2017	Australian Championships	Adelaide, Australia	
200m freestyle	1:49.36	WR	Mollie O'Callaghan	Australia	24 October 2025	World Cup	Toronto, Canada	
400m freestyle	3:51.87	OC	Lani Pallister	Australia	23 October 2025	World Cup	Toronto, Canada	
800m freestyle	7:54.00	WR	Lani Pallister	Australia	25 October 2025	World Cup	Toronto, Canada	
1500m freestyle	15:13.83	CR	Lani Pallister	Australia	19 October 2025	World Cup	Westmont, United States	
50m backstroke	25.35	OC	Kaylee McKeown	Australia	23 October 2025	World Cup	Toronto, Canada	
100m backstroke	54.49	CR	Kaylee McKeown	Australia	24 October 2025	World Cup	Toronto, Canada	
200m backstroke	1:57.33	WR	Kaylee McKeown	Australia	25 October 2025	World Cup	Toronto, Canada	
50m breaststroke	29.50	OC	Sarah Katsoulis	Australia	22 November 2009	World Cup	Singapore, Singapore	
100m breaststroke	1:03.00	OC	Leisel Jones	Australia	14 November 2009	World Cup	Berlin, Germany	
200m breaststroke	2:15.42	CR	Leisel Jones	Australia	15 November 2009	World Cup	Berlin, Germany	
50m butterfly	24.60	CR	Alexandria Perkins	Australia	18 October 2025	World Cup	Westmont, United States	
100m butterfly	54.93	OC	Alexandria Perkins	Australia	12 October 2025	World Cup	Carmel, United States	
200m butterfly	2:02.88	OC	Ellen Gandy	Nunawading	25 August 2013	Australian Championships	Sydney, Australia	
100m individual medley	57.53	CR	Alicia Coutts	Australia	10 November 2013	World Cup	Tokyo, Japan	
200m individual medley	2:03.57	OC	Kaylee McKeown	Australia	13 December 2022	World Championships	Melbourne, Australia	
400m individual medley	4:28.39	OC	Jenna Forrester	St Peters Western	30 September 2026	Australian Championships	Sydney, Australia	
4 × 50 m freestyle relay	1:34.23	CR	Meg Harris (23.98); Madison Wilson (23.51); Mollie O'Callaghan (24.01); Emma McKeon (22.73)	Australia	15 December 2022	World Championships	Melbourne, Australia	
4 × 100 m freestyle relay	3:25.43	CR	Mollie O'Callaghan (52.19); Madison Wilson (51.28); Meg Harris (52.00); Emma McKeon (49.96)	Australia	13 December 2022	World Championships	Melbourne, Australia	
4 × 200 m freestyle relay	7:30.87	CR	Madison Wilson (1:53.13); Mollie O'Callaghan (1:52.83); Leah Neale (1:52.67); Lani Pallister (1:52.24)	Australia	14 December 2022	World Championships	Melbourne, Australia	
4 × 50 m medley relay	1:42.35	WR	Mollie O'Callaghan (25.49); Chelsea Hodges (29.11); Emma Mckeon (24.43); Madison Wilson (23.32)	Australia	17 December 2022	World Championships	Melbourne, Australia	
4 × 100 m medley relay	3:44.92	CR	Kaylee McKeown (55.74); Jenna Strauch (1:04.49); Emma Mckeon (53.93); Meg Harris (50.76)	Australia	18 December 2022	World Championships	Melbourne, Australia	

Legend: # – Record awaiting ratification by Swimming Australia; WR – World record; OC – Oceanian record; CR – Commonwealth record; e – equalled existing record;
Records not set in finals: h – heat; sf – semifinal; r – relay 1st leg; rh – relay heat 1st leg; b – B final; † – en route to final mark; so – swim-off; tt – time trial

==== Mixed relay ====
Event	Time		Name	Club	Date	Meet	Location	Ref
4 × 50 m freestyle relay	1:28.03	OC	Kyle Chalmers (20.97); Matthew Temple (20.71); Meg Harris (23.73); Emma McKeon (22.62)	Australia	16 December 2022	World Championships	Melbourne, Australia	
4 × 50 m medley relay	1:36.78	OC	Isaac Cooper (22.68); Joshua Yong (25.87); Alexandria Perkins (24.61); Meg Harris (23.62)	Australia	11 December 2024	World Championships	Budapest, Hungary	
4×100 m medley relay	3:32.83	OC, not ratified	Iona Anderson (55.89); Joshua Yong (56.40); Matthew Temple (48.63); Milla Jansen (51.91)	Australia	14 December 2024	World Championships	Budapest, Hungary	

Legend: # – Record awaiting ratification by Swimming Australia; WR – World record; OC – Oceanian record; CR – Commonwealth record; e – equalled existing record;
Records not set in finals: h – heat; so – swim-off

== Australian Allcomers records ==
=== Long course (50 metres) ===
==== Men ====
Event	Time		Name	Nationality	Date	Meet	Location	Ref
50m freestyle	21.19		Ashley Callus	North End Aquatics	26 November 2009	AIS International	Canberra, Australia	
100m freestyle	47.04	CR	Cameron McEvoy	Bond University	11 April 2016	Australian Championships	Adelaide, Australia	
200m freestyle	1:43.86		Michael Phelps	United States	27 March 2007	World Championships	Melbourne, Australia	
400m freestyle	3:40.54		Ian Thorpe	SLC Aquadot	18 March 2002	Australian Championships	Brisbane, Australia	
800 m freestyle	7:36.73	CR	Samuel Short	Rackley	10 June 2026	Australian Trials	Sydney, Australia	
1500m freestyle	14:39.54		Mack Horton	Melbourne Vicentre	14 April 2016	Australian Championships	Adelaide, Australia	
50m backstroke	24.38		Isaac Cooper	St Andrew's	10 March 2023	NSW State Championships	Sydney, Australia	
100m backstroke	52.38		Mitch Larkin	St Peters Western	10 June 2019	Australian Trials	Brisbane, Australia	
200m backstroke	1:52.86		Ryosuke Irie	Japan	10 May 2009	Duel in the Pool: Australia vs Japan	Canberra, Australia	
50m breaststroke	26.49	sf	Adam Peaty	England	8 April 2018	Commonwealth Games	Gold Coast, Australia	
100m breaststroke	58.80		Samuel Williamson	Melbourne Vicentre	10 June 2024	Australian Trials	Brisbane, Australia	
100m breaststroke	58.59	sf, not ratified	Adam Peaty	England	6 April 2018	Commonwealth Games	Gold Coast, Australia	
200m breaststroke	2:05.95	CR	Zac Stubblety-Cook	Chandler	19 May 2022	Australian Championships	Adelaide, Australia	
50m butterfly	22.77		Kyle Chalmers	Marion	7 April 2026	Australian Open	Gold Coast, Australia	
100m butterfly	50.45		Matthew Temple	Nunawading	17 June 2021	Australian Trials	Adelaide, Australia	
200m butterfly	1:52.09		Michael Phelps	United States	28 March 2007	World Championships	Melbourne, Australia	
200m individual medley	1:54.98		Michael Phelps	United States	29 March 2007	World Championships	Melbourne, Australia	
400m individual medley	4:06.22		Michael Phelps	United States	1 April 2007	World Championships	Melbourne, Australia	
4 × 100 m freestyle relay	3:12.26	tt	James Roberts (48.63); Kyle Chalmers (48.24); James Magnussen (48.17); Cameron McEvoy (47.22)	Australia	14 April 2016	Australian Championships	Adelaide, Australia	
4 × 200 m freestyle relay	7:03.24		Michael Phelps (1:45.36); Ryan Lochte (1:45.86); Klete Keller (1:46.31); Peter Vanderkaay (1:45.71)	United States	30 March 2007	World Championships	Melbourne, Australia	
4 × 100 m medley relay	3:29.94		Matt Grevers (53.10); Kevin Cordes (58.64); Michael Phelps (50.60); Nathan Adrian (47.60)	United States	24 August 2014	Pan Pacific Championships	Gold Coast, Australia	

Legend: # – Record awaiting ratification by Swimming Australia; WR – World record; AS – Asian record; OC – Oceanian record; CR – Commonwealth record; e – equalled existing record;
Records not set in finals: h – heat; sf – semifinal; r – relay 1st leg; rh – relay heat 1st leg; b – B final; † – en route to final mark; so – swim-off; tt – time trial

==== Women ====
Event	Time		Name	Nationality	Date	Meet	Location	Ref
50m freestyle	23.78	CR	Cate Campbell	Australia	7 April 2018	Commonwealth Games	Gold Coast, Australia	
100m freestyle	52.06		Cate Campbell	Commercial	2 July 2016	Australia Grand Prix	Brisbane, Australia	
200m freestyle	1:52.23	WR	Ariarne Titmus	St Peters Western	12 June 2024	Australian Trials	Brisbane, Australia	
400m freestyle	3:55.44		Ariarne Titmus	St Peters Western	10 June 2024	Australian Trials	Brisbane, Australia	
800m freestyle	8:10.84		Lani Pallister	St Peters Western	12 June 2025	Australian Trials	Adelaide, Australia	
1500m freestyle	15:28.36		Katie Ledecky	United States	24 August 2014	Pan Pacific Championships	Gold Coast, Australia	
50m backstroke	26.98	r	Kaylee McKeown	Griffith University	9 December 2023	Queensland Championships	Brisbane, Australia	
100m backstroke	57.41		Kaylee McKeown	USC Spartans	11 June 2024	Australian Trials	Brisbane, Australia	
200m backstroke	2:03.14	WR	Kaylee McKeown	Griffith University	10 March 2023	NSW State Championships	Sydney, Australia	
50m breaststroke	30.15		Chelsea Hodges	Southport	19 May 2022	Australian Championships	Adelaide, Australia	
100m breaststroke	1:05.09	OC	Leisel Jones	Australia	20 March 2006	Commonwealth Games	Melbourne, Australia	
200m breaststroke	2:20.04		Rie Kaneto	Japan	6 February 2016	Perth Aquatic Super Series	Perth, Australia	
50m butterfly	25.33		Rikako Ikee	Japan	19 April 2024	Australian Championships	Gold Coast, Australia	
100m butterfly	55.93		Emma McKeon	Griffith University	12 June 2021	Australian Trials	Adelaide, Australia	
200m butterfly	2:04.95		Elizabeth Dekkers	St Peters Western	11 June 2026	Australian Trials	Sydney, Australia	
200m individual medley	2:06.63	OC	Kaylee McKeown	Griffith University	10 June 2024	Australian Trials	Brisbane, Australia	
400m individual medley	4:28.22	OC	Kaylee McKeown	Griffith University	18 April 2024	Australian Championships	Gold Coast, Australia	
4 × 100 m freestyle relay	3:30.05		Shayna Jack (54.03); Bronte Campbell (52.03); Emma McKeon (52.99); Cate Campbell (51.00)	Australia	5 April 2018	Commonwealth Games	Gold Coast, Australia	
4 × 200 m freestyle relay	7:46.40		Shannon Vreeland (1:57.89); Missy Franklin (1:56.12); Leah Smith (1:58.03); Katie Ledecky (1:54.36)	United States	22 August 2014	Pan Pacific Championships	Gold Coast, Australia	
4 × 100 m medley relay	3:54.36		Emily Seebohm (59.41); Georgia Bohl (1:06.85); Emma McKeon (56.42); Bronte Campbell (51.57)	Australia	10 April 2018	Commonwealth Games	Gold Coast, Australia	

Legend: # – Record awaiting ratification by Swimming Australia; WR – World record; AS – Asian record; OC – Oceanian record; CR – Commonwealth record; e – equalled existing record;
Records not set in finals: h – heat; sf – semifinal; r – relay 1st leg; rh – relay heat 1st leg; b – B final; † – en route to final mark; so – swim-off; tt – time trial

==== Mixed relay ====
Event	Time	Name	Club	Date	Meet	Location	Ref
4 × 100 m freestyle relay	3:23.29	Tommaso D'Orsogna (49.65); Cate Campbell (52.83); James Magnussen (47.29); Bronte Campbell (53.52)	Australia	1 February 2014	BHP Billiton Aquatic Super Series	Perth, Australia	
4 × 100 m medley relay	3:46.52	Ashley Delaney (54.67); Daniel Tranter (1:01.48); Alicia Coutts (57.40); Emma McKeon (52.97)	Australia	31 January 2014	BHP Billiton Aquatic Super Series	Perth, Australia	

Legend: # – Record awaiting ratification by Swimming Australia; WR – World record; OC – Oceanian record; e – equalled existing record;
Records not set in finals: h – heat; so – swim-off

=== Short course (25 metres) ===
==== Men ====
Event	Time		Name	Nationality	Date	Meet	Location	Ref
50m freestyle	20.68		Isaac Cooper	St Andrew's	2 October 2026	Australian Championships	Sydney, Australia	
50m freestyle	20.31	sf, #	Jordan Crooks	Cayman Islands	16 December 2022	World Championships	Melbourne, Australia	
100m freestyle	45.16		Kyle Chalmers	Australia	15 December 2022	World Championships	Melbourne, Australia	
200m freestyle	1:40.16	OC	Edward Sommerville	Brisbane Grammar	29 September 2026	Australian Championships	Sydney, Australia	
200m freestyle	1:39.72	AS, #	Hwang Sun-woo	South Korea	18 December 2022	World Championships	Melbourne, Australia	
400m freestyle	3:34.58	OC	Grant Hackett	Miami	18 July 2002	2nd Australian Grand Prix	Sydney, Australia	
400m freestyle	3:34.38	AM, #	Kieran Smith	United States	15 December 2022	World Championships	Melbourne, Australia	
800m freestyle	7:23.42	CR	Grant Hackett	Melbourne Vicentre	20 July 2008	Victorian Championships	Melbourne, Australia	
1500m freestyle	14:10.10	CR	Grant Hackett	Miami	7 August 2001	Australian Championships	Perth, Australia	
50m backstroke	22.52	sf	Isaac Cooper	Australia	15 December 2022	World Championships	Melbourne, Australia	
100m backstroke	49.03	r, CR	Mitch Larkin	St Peters Western	28 November 2015	Australian Championships	Sydney, Australia	
100m backstroke	48.50	#	Ryan Murphy	United States	14 December 2022	World Championships	Melbourne, Australia	
200m backstroke	1:45.63	CR	Mitch Larkin	St Peters Western	27 November 2015	Australian Championships	Sydney, Australia	
50m breaststroke	26.02	OC	Grayson Bell	Somerville House	27 September 2024	Australian Championships	Adelaide, Australia	
50m breaststroke	25.38	AM, #	Nic Fink	United States	18 December 2022	World Championships	Melbourne, Australia	
100m breaststroke	56.61	OC	Joshua Collett	Bond	29 September 2026	Australian Championships	Sydney, Australia	
100m breaststroke	55.88	#	Nic Fink	United States	15 December 2022	World Championships	Melbourne, Australia	
200m breaststroke	2:01.98	OC	Christian Sprenger	Commercial	10 August 2009	Australian Championships	Hobart, Australia	
200m breaststroke	2:00.35	AS, #	Daiya Seto	Japan	16 December 2022	World Championships	Melbourne, Australia	
50m butterfly	21.90	OC	Ben Armbruster	Bond	29 September 2026	Australian Championships	Sydney, Australia	
50m butterfly	21.78	#	Nicholas Santos	Brazil	14 December 2022	World Championships	Melbourne, Australia	
100m butterfly	48.62	tt, OC	Matthew Temple	Marion	13 December 2023	SASI Time Trial	Adelaide, Australia	
100m butterfly	48.59	#	Chad le Clos	South Africa	18 December 2022	World Championships	Melbourne, Australia	
200m butterfly	1:48.27	AF	Chad le Clos	South Africa	15 December 2022	World Championships	Melbourne, Australia	
100m individual medley	51.05		Javier Acevedo	Canada	16 December 2022	World Championships	Melbourne, Australia	
100m individual medley	50.97	#	Thomas Ceccon	Italy	16 December 2022	World Championships	Melbourne, Australia	
200m individual medley	1:50.15	AF, CR	Matthew Sates	South Africa	13 December 2022	World Championships	Melbourne, Australia	
400m individual medley	3:57.91	CR	Thomas Fraser-Holmes	Miami	28 November 2015	Australian Championships	Sydney, Australia	
400m individual medley	3:55.75	#	Daiya Seto	Japan	17 December 2022	World Championships	Melbourne, Australia	
4 × 50 m freestyle relay	1:23.44	CR	Isaac Cooper (21.25); Matthew Temple (20.75); Flynn Southam (21.10); Kyle Chalmers (20.34)	Australia	15 December 2022	World Championships	Melbourne, Australia	
4 × 100 m freestyle relay	3:02.75	ER	Alessandro Miressi (46.15); Paolo Conte Bonin (45.93); Leonardo Deplano (45.54); Thomas Ceccon (45.13)	Italy	13 December 2022	World Championships	Melbourne, Australia	
4 × 200 m freestyle relay	6:44.12		Kieran Smith (1:41.04); Carson Foster (1:40.48); Trenton Julian (1:41.44); Drew Kibler (1:41.16)	United States	16 December 2022	World Championships	Melbourne, Australia	
4 × 50 m medley relay	1:29.72	WR	Lorenzo Mora (22.65); Nicolò Martinenghi (24.95); Matteo Rivolta (21.60); Leonardo Deplano (20.52)	Italy	17 December 2022	World Championships	Melbourne, Australia	
4 × 100 m medley relay	3:18.98	CR	Isaac Cooper (49.46); Joshua Yong (56.55); Matthew Temple (48.34); Kyle Chalmers (44.63)	Australia	18 December 2022	World Championships	Melbourne, Australia	
4 × 100 m medley relay	3:18.98	AM	Ryan Murphy (48.96); Nic Fink (54.88); Trenton Julian (49.19); Kieran Smith (45.95)	United States	18 December 2022	World Championships	Melbourne, Australia	

Legend: # – Record awaiting ratification by Swimming Australia; WR – World record; AM – Americas record; AS – Asian record; OC – Oceanian record; CR – Commonwealth record; e – equalled existing record;
Records not set in finals: h – heat; sf – semifinal; r – relay 1st leg; rh – relay heat 1st leg; b – B final; † – en route to final mark; so – swim-off; tt – time trial

==== Women ====
Event	Time		Name	Nationality	Date	Meet	Location	Ref
50 m freestyle	23.04	CR	Emma McKeon	Australia	17 December 2022	World Championships	Melbourne, Australia	
100 m freestyle	50.25	CR	Cate Campbell	Commercial	26 October 2017	Australian Championships	Adelaide, Australia	
200m freestyle	1:51.66		Emma McKeon	St Peters Western	28 November 2015	Australian Championships	Sydney, Australia	
200 m freestyle	1:51.65	#	Siobhán Haughey	Hong Kong	18 December 2022	World Championships	Melbourne, Australia	
400m freestyle	3:54.55		Lani Pallister	St Peters Western	1 October 2026	Australian Championships	Sydney, Australia	
800m freestyle	8:01.66		Lani Pallister	St Peters Western	2 October 2026	Australian Championships	Sydney, Australia	
1500 m freestyle	15:18.68		Lani Pallister	St Peters Western	29 September 2026	Australian Championships	Sydney, Australia	
50 m backstroke	25.25	CR	Maggie Mac Neil	Canada	16 December 2022	World Championships	Melbourne, Australia	
100 m backstroke	54.56		Kaylee McKeown	Griffith University	26 September 2024	Australian Championships	Adelaide, Australia	
200 m backstroke	1:58.94		Kaylee McKeown	USC Spartans	28 November 2020	Australian Championships	Brisbane, Australia	
50 m breaststroke	28.37	sf, WR	Rūta Meilutytė	Lithuania	17 December 2022	World Championships	Melbourne, Australia	
100m breaststroke	1:03.63		Leisel Jones	Nunawading	17 July 2010	Australian Championships	Brisbane, Australia	
100 m breaststroke	1:02.67	#	Lilly King	United States	15 December 2022	World Championships	Melbourne, Australia	
200m breaststroke	2:17.75		Leisel Jones	Redcliffe Leagues	29 November 2003	World Cup	Melbourne, Australia	
200 m breaststroke	2:15.77	#	Kate Douglass	United States	16 December 2022	World Championships	Melbourne, Australia	
50m butterfly	24.64	=	Maggie Mac Neil	Canada	14 December 2022	World Championships	Melbourne, Australia	
50m butterfly	24.64	=, #	Torri Huske	United States	14 December 2022	World Championships	Melbourne, Australia	
100m butterfly	54.05	CR	Maggie Mac Neil	Canada	18 December 2022	World Championships	Melbourne, Australia	
200m butterfly	2:02.88	OC	Ellen Gandy	Nunawading	25 August 2013	Australian Championships	Sydney, Australia	
100m individual medley	57.71		Alicia Coutts	Redlands	24 August 2013	Australian Championships	Sydney, Australia	
100m individual medley	57.53	#	Marrit Steenbergen	Netherlands	16 December 2022	World Championships	Melbourne, Australia	
200m individual medley	2:03.57	OC	Kaylee McKeown	Australia	13 December 2022	World Championships	Melbourne, Australia	
200m individual medley	2:02.12	#	Kate Douglass	United States	13 December 2022	World Championships	Melbourne, Australia	
400m individual medley	4:28.39	OC	Jenna Forrester	St Peters Western	30 September 2026	Australian Championships	Sydney, Australia	
400m individual medley	4:26.51	#	Hali Flickinger	United States	17 December 2022	World Championships	Melbourne, Australia	
4 × 50 m freestyle relay	1:33.89	AM	Torri Huske (24.08); Claire Curzan (23.30); Erika Brown (23.74); Kate Douglass (22.77)	United States	15 December 2022	World Championships	Melbourne, Australia	
4 × 100 m freestyle relay	3:25.43	CR	Mollie O'Callaghan (52.19); Madison Wilson (51.28); Meg Harris (52.00); Emma McKeon (49.96)	Australia	13 December 2022	World Championships	Melbourne, Australia	
4 × 200 m freestyle relay	7:30.87	CR	Madison Wilson (1:53.13); Mollie O'Callaghan (1:52.83); Leah Neale (1:52.67); Lani Pallister (1:52.24)	Australia	14 December 2022	World Championships	Melbourne, Australia	
4 × 50 m medley relay	1:42.35	WR	Mollie O'Callaghan (25.49); Chelsea Hodges (29.11); Emma McKeon (24.43); Madison Wilson (23.32)	Australia	17 December 2022	World Championships	Melbourne, Australia	
4 × 100 m medley relay	3:44.35		Claire Curzan (56.47); Lilly King (1:02.88); Torri Huske (54.53); Kate Douglass (50.47)	United States	18 December 2022	World Championships	Melbourne, Australia	

Legend: # – Record awaiting ratification by Swimming Australia; WR – World record; OC – Oceanian record; CR – Commonwealth record; e – equalled existing record;
Records not set in finals: h – heat; sf – semifinal; r – relay 1st leg; rh – relay heat 1st leg; b – B final; † – en route to final mark; so – swim-off; tt – time trial

==== Mixed relay ====
Event	Time		Name	Club	Date	Meet	Location	Ref
4 × 50 m freestyle relay	1:27.33		Maxime Grousset (20.92); Florent Manaudou (20.26); Béryl Gastaldello (23.00); Mélanie Henique (23.15)	France	16 December 2022	World Championships	Melbourne, Australia	
4 × 50 m medley relay	1:35.15	WR	Ryan Murphy (22.37); Nic Fink (24.96); Kate Douglass (24.09); Torri Huske (23.73)	United States	14 December 2022	World Championships	Melbourne, Australia	

Legend: # – Record awaiting ratification by Swimming Australia; WR – World record; OC – Oceanian record; e – equalled existing record;
Records not set in finals: h – heat; so – swim-off

== Australian club records ==
=== Long course (50 metres) ===
==== Men ====
Event	Time	Name	Club	Date	Meet	Location	Ref
4 × 100 m freestyle relay	3:15.27	Kai Taylor (47.97); Jack Cartwright (49.91); Elijah Winnington (49.71); Jamie Jack (47.68)	St Peters Western	8 April 2026	Australian Open	Gold Coast, Australia	
4 × 200 m freestyle relay	7:09.29	Maximillian Giuliani (1:44.79); Alexander Graham (1:46.23); Alexander Grant (1:50.98); James Koch (1:47.29)	Miami	12 December 2023	Queensland Championships	Brisbane, Australia	
4 × 100 m medley relay	3:37.09	Daniel Arnamnart (55.21); Daniel Tranter (1:01.52); Jayden Hadler (52.69); James Magnussen (47.67)	SOPAC	14 December 2013	Queensland Championships	Brisbane, Australia	

Legend: # – Record awaiting ratification by Swimming Australia; WR – World record; OC – Oceanian record; CR – Commonwealth record; e – equalled existing record;
Records not set in finals: h – heat; sf – semifinal; r – relay 1st leg; rh – relay heat 1st leg; b – B final; † – en route to final mark; so – swim-off; tt – time trial

==== Women ====
Event	Time	Name	Club	Date	Meet	Location	Ref
4 × 100 m freestyle relay	3:34.61	Milla Jansen (54.18); Shayna Jack (52.95); Mollie O'Callaghan (53.12); Lani Pallister (54.36)	St Peters Western	8 April 2026	Australian Open	Gold Coast, Australia	
4 × 200 m freestyle relay	7:57.03	Shayna Jack (1:56.77); Michaela Ryan (2:00.51); Abbey Harkin (2:02.95); Ariarne Titmus (1:56.80)	St Peters Western	10 April 2019	Australian Championships	Adelaide, Australia	
4 × 100 m medley relay	3:57.34	Madison Wilson (59.77); Georgia Bohl (1:06.61); Madeline Groves (57.79); Emma McKeon (53.17)	St Peters Western	14 April 2016	Australian Championships	Adelaide, Australia	

Legend: # – Record awaiting ratification by Swimming Australia; WR – World record; OC – Oceanian record; CR – Commonwealth record; e – equalled existing record;
Records not set in finals: h – heat; sf – semifinal; r – relay 1st leg; rh – relay heat 1st leg; b – B final; † – en route to final mark; so – swim-off; tt – time trial

=== Short course (25 metres) ===
==== Men ====
Event	Time	Name	Club	Date	Meet	Location	Ref
4 × 100 m freestyle relay	3:12.05	Tate Sirianni (48.10); Jacob Whitton (48.79); Lewis Kreutzberger (48.78); Marcus Da Silva (46.38)	Cranbrook	1 October 2026	Australian Championships	Sydney, Australia	
4 × 200 m freestyle relay	7:00.20	Daniel Smith (1:44.22); Thomas Fraser-Holmes (1:43.02); Alexander Graudins (1:47.96); Jordan Harrison (1:45.00)	Miami	6 November 2014	Australian Championships	Adelaide, Australia	
4 × 100 m medley relay	3:27.65	Michael Jackson (53.17); Christian Sprenger (57.35); Chris Wright (50.20); Kyle Richardson (46.93)	Commercial	12 August 2009	Australian Championships	Hobart, Australia	

Legend: # – Record awaiting ratification by Swimming Australia; WR – World record; OC – Oceanian record; CR – Commonwealth record; e – equalled existing record;
Records not set in finals: h – heat; sf – semifinal; r – relay 1st leg; rh – relay heat 1st leg; b – B final; † – en route to final mark; so – swim-off; tt – time trial

==== Women ====
Event	Time	Name	Club	Date	Meet	Location	Ref
4 × 100 m freestyle relay	3:35.68	Brittany Elmslie (52.98); Emily Seebohm (53.03); Laticia-Leigh Transom (55.22); Gemma Cooney (54.45)	Brisbane Grammar	3 November 2016	Australian Championships	Brisbane, Australia	
4 × 200 m freestyle relay	7:52.90	Brittany Elmslie (1:54.72); Madison Wilson (1:56.50); Amy Forrester (2:01.43); Katie Goldman (2:00.25)	St Peters Western	5 November 2014	Australian Championships	Adelaide, Australia	
4 × 100 m medley relay	3:55.38	Madison Wilson (57.58); Georgia Bohl (1:05.96); Madeline Groves (58.78); Bronte Barratt (53.06)	St Peters Western	28 November 2015	Australian Championships	Sydney, Australia	

Legend: # – Record awaiting ratification by Swimming Australia; WR – World record; OC – Oceanian record; CR – Commonwealth record; e – equalled existing record;
Records not set in finals: h – heat; sf – semifinal; r – relay 1st leg; rh – relay heat 1st leg; b – B final; † – en route to final mark; so – swim-off; tt – time trial

==== Mixed relay ====
Event	Time	Name	Club	Date	Meet	Location	Ref
4 × 50 m freestyle relay	1:34.15	William Yang (21.99); Caleb Yago (22.07); Elizabeth Gan (24.82); Asha Ring (25.27)	Sydney University	30 September 2026	Australian Championships	Sydney, Australia	
4 × 50 m medley relay	1:34.15	Iona Anderson (25.77); Joshua Yong (26.04); Daniel Boshart (23.26); Alyssa Burgess (24.50)	Highlanders	29 September 2026	Australian Championships	Sydney, Australia	

Legend: # – Record awaiting ratification by Swimming Australia; e – equalled existing record;
Records not set in finals: h – heat; sf – semifinal; r – relay 1st leg; rh – relay heat 1st leg; b – B final; † – en route to final mark; so – swim-off; tt – time trial
