= 2009 Australian Short Course Swimming Championships =

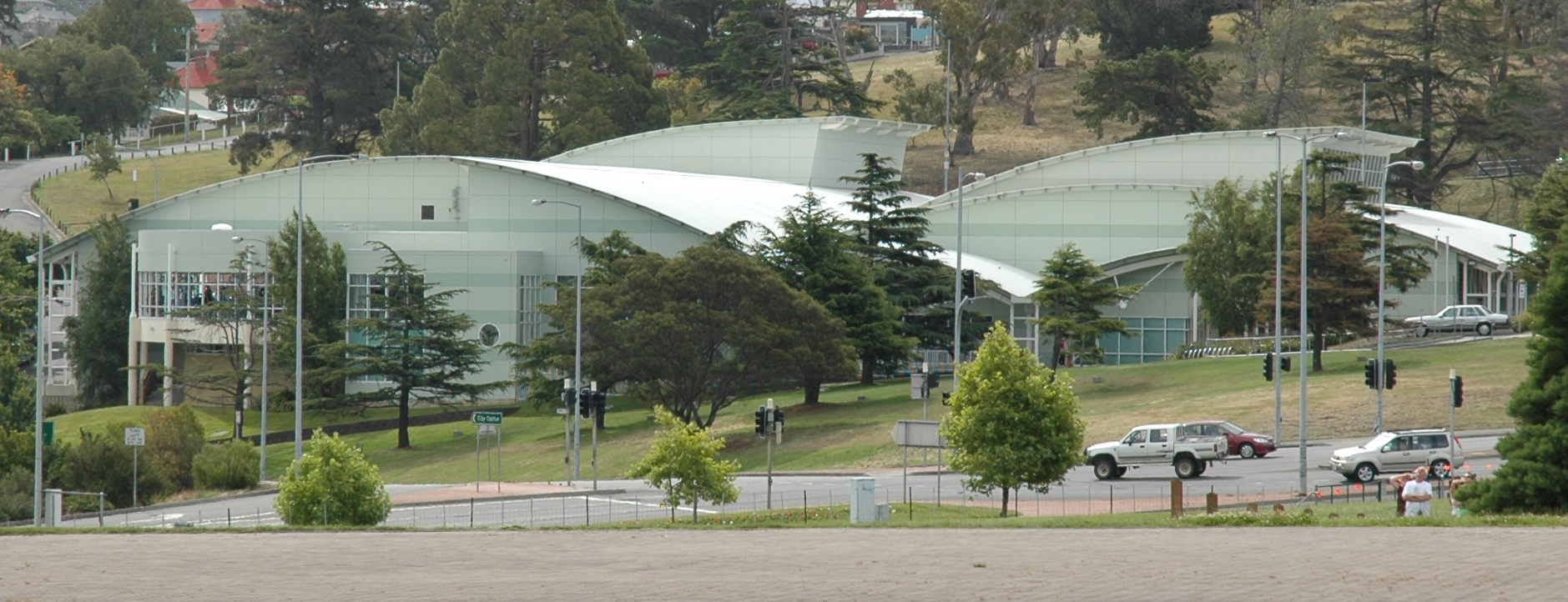
Hobart Aquatic Centre

The 2009 Australian Short Course Swimming Championships were held at the Hobart Aquatic Centre from Saturday 8 August to Wednesday 12 August. They were organised by Swimming Australia and sponsored by Telstra.

The events were spread over five days of competition featuring heats in the morning, with semi-finals and finals in the evening session. The format of the meet consisted of heats for all individual events with semi-finals in the 50 and 100 m individual events. The 200 and 400 m events consisted of A and B finals with no semi-finals whilst the 800 and 1500 m freestyle and relay events consisted of timed finals only.

== Medal winners ==
=== Men's events ===
Event	Gold		Silver		Bronze	
50 m freestyle	Matthew Abood; Sydney University (NSW)	21.08	Ashley Callus; North End (Qld)	21.21	Kyle Richardson; Commercial (Qld)	21.26
100 m freestyle	Matthew Abood; Sydney University (NSW)	46.29; AR	Tommaso D'Orsogna; West Coast (WA)	46.83	Kyle Richardson; Commercial (Qld)	47.19
200 m freestyle	Tommaso D'Orsogna; West Coast (WA)	1:42.26; ACR	Daniel Smith; Pro-Ma Miami (Qld)	1:43.26	Robert Hurley; Wests Illawarra (NSW)	1:43.81
400 m freestyle	Daniel Smith; Pro-Ma Miami (Qld)	3:40.42	Thomas Fraser-Holmes; Hunter (NSW)	3:41.72	Robert Hurley; Wests Illawarra (NSW)	3:41.89
800 m freestyle	Robert Hurley; Wests Illawarra (NSW)	7:49.68	Shane Asbury; Nunawading (Vic)	7:54.25	Matthew Terry; Redcliffe Leagues (Qld)	7:55.53
1500 m freestyle	Thomas Fraser-Holmes; Hunter (NSW)	14:49.82	Jarrod Killey; Hunter (NSW)	15:10.73	Mitchell Thomson; Albany Creek (Qld)	15:11.41
50 m backstroke	Robert Hurley; Wests Illawarra (NSW)	23.57	Daniel Arnamnart; Aquaburn (NSW)	23.60	Daniel Bell; New Zealand	23.77
100 m backstroke	Robert Hurley; Wests Illawarra (NSW)	50.93	Daniel Arnamnart; Aquaburn (NSW)	51.10	Daniel Bell; New Zealand	1:43.26
200 m backstroke	Ashley Delaney; Nunawading (Vic)	1:49.62; CR	Ayrton Dickey; City of Perth (WA)	1:53.64	Jared Goldthorpe; Bayside (NSW)	1:53.77
50 m breaststroke	Christian Sprenger; Commercial (Qld)	26.60; AR	Karl Wurzer; Hobart Aquatic (Tas)	27.08	Glenn Snyders; New Zealand	27.13
100 m breaststroke	Glenn Snyders; New Zealand	58.88	Craig Calder; Albury (NSW)	59.78	Karl Wurzer; Hobart Aquatic (Tas)	59.81
200 m breaststroke	Christian Sprenger; Commercial (Qld)	2:01.98; WR	Craig Calder; Albury (NSW)	2:08.40	Jeremy Meyer; Traralgon (Vic)	2:08.66
50 m butterfly	Matt Jaukovic; Sydney University (NSW)	22.28; CR	Corney Swanepoel; New Zealand	22.60	Geoff Huegill; SOPAC (NSW)	22.80
100 m butterfly	Adam Pine; Ginninderra (ACT)	49.71; CR	Corney Swanepoel; New Zealand	50.42	Matt Jaukovic; Sydney University (NSW)	50.57
200 m butterfly	Chris Wright; Commercial (Qld)	1:51.11; AR	Nick D'Arcy; Noosa (Qld)	1:51.40	Moss Burmester; New Zealand	1:52.45
100 m individual medley	Leith Brodie; Albany Creek (Qld)	51.96; AR	Tommaso D'Orsogna; West Coast (WA)	52.71	Daniel Bell; New Zealand	53.49
200 m individual medley	Leith Brodie; Albany Creek (Qld)	1:52.86; CR	Sam Ashby; Nunawading (Vic)	1:56.10	Tommaso D'Orsogna; West Coast (WA)	1:56.28
400 m individual medley	Thomas Fraser-Holmes; Hunter (NSW)	4:07.48	Leith Brodie; Albany Creek (Qld)	4:10.86	Declan Potts; Norwood (SA)	4:14.00
4 × 100 m freestyle relay	Melbourne Vicentre 'A' (Vic); Cameron Prosser; Ryan Nolan; Justin Griggs; Lloyd Townsing	3:12.77; ACR	Commercial 'A' (Qld); Chris Wright; Jayden Hadler; Mathew Brooks; Kyle Richardson	3:14.82	Cranbrook Eastern Edge (NSW); Tom Miller; Ben Campbell; Christopher Karow; Alexander Ross	3:16.17
4 × 200 m freestyle relay	Commercial 'A' (Qld); Adam Kable; Jayden Hadler; Kyle Richardson; Chris Wright	7:03.76	St. Peters Western (Qld); Cameron Smith; Kenrick Monk; Nathan Cobbe; Grant Irvine	7:08.72	Hunter 'A' (NSW); Thomas Fraser-Holmes; Jarrod Killey; Tim Lane; Samuel Parker	7:14.71
4 × 100 m medley relay	Commercial 'A' (Qld); Michael Jackson; Christian Sprenger; Chris Wright; Kyle Richardson	3:27.65; ACR	Melbourne Vicentre 'A' (Vic); Daniel Blackborrow; Daniel Crook; Paul Benson; Cameron Prosser	3:32.94	Nunawading 'A' (Vic); Travis Mahoney; Jack Laidler; Sam Ashby; Jeremy Saunders	3:33.80

Legend: WR – World record; CR – Commonwealth record; OR – Oceanian record; AR – Australian record; ACR – Australian All Comers record; Club – Australian Club record

=== Women's events ===
Event	Gold		Silver		Bronze	
50 m freestyle	Sally Foster; Central Aquatic (WA)	23.94	Hayley Palmer; New Zealand	24.39	Alice Mills; Chandler (Qld)	24.59
100 m freestyle	Libby Trickett; SOPAC (NSW)	51.01; WR	Sally Foster; Central Aquatic (WA)	52.48	Marieke Guehrer; Melbourne Vicentre (Vic)	52.61
200 m freestyle	Felicity Galvez; SOPAC (NSW)	1:54.88	Merinda Dingjan; Southside Wesley (WA)	1:55.10	Kelly Stubbins; Haileybury Waterlions (Vic)	1:55.55
400 m freestyle	Ellen Fullerton; Pro-Ma Miami (Qld)	4:02.76	Blair Evans; City of Perth (WA)	4:04.60	Katie Goldman; Pro-Ma Miami (Qld)	4:04.64
800 m freestyle	Katie Goldman; Pro-Ma Miami (Qld)	8:22.93	Blair Evans; City of Perth (WA)	8:23.00	Kylie Palmer; Albany Creek (Qld)	8:30.35
1500 m freestyle	Belinda Bennett; Nunawading (Vic)	16:17.87	Luane Rowe; Willoughby (NSW)	16:37.85	Stephanie Demestichas; Tigersharks (Vic)	16:46.14
50 m backstroke	Emily Seebohm; Brothers (Qld)	27.03; ACR	Charlotte Clarke; Norwood (SA)	27.09	Tayliah Zimmer; Nunawading (Vic)	27.26
100 m backstroke	Emily Seebohm; Brothers (Qld)	57.47; CR	Tayliah Zimmer; Nunawading (Vic)	57.95	Belinda Hocking; Albury (NSW)	57.97
200 m backstroke	Belinda Hocking; Albury (NSW)	2:02.91; AR	Tayliah Zimmer; Nunawading (Vic)	2:06.11	Bridgette-Rose Taylor; Commercial (Qld)	2:07.11
50 m breaststroke	Sarah Katsoulis; Nunawading (Vic)	29.61; CR	Leisel Jones; Nunawading (Vic)	30.14	Kristy Morrison; Castle Hill RSL Dolphins (NSW)	30.41
100 m breaststroke	Leisel Jones; Nunawading (Vic)	1:04.04	Kristy Morrison; Castle Hill RSL Dolphins (NSW)	1:06.41	Chelsea Carpenter; Nunawading (Vic)	1:06.44
200 m breaststroke	Leisel Jones; Nunawading (Vic)	2:19.35	Rebecca Kemp; Mackay (Qld)	2:24.37	Chelsea Carpenter; Nunawading (Vic)	2:24.53
50 m butterfly	Felicity Galvez; SOPAC (NSW)	25.45	Marieke Guehrer; Melbourne Vicentre (Vic)	25.53	Jessicah Schipper; Commercial (Qld)	25.98
100 m butterfly	Jessicah Schipper; Commercial (Qld)	55.68; WR	Felicity Galvez; SOPAC (NSW)	56.15	Samantha Hamill; Kawana Waters (Qld)	58.27
200 m butterfly	Jessicah Schipper; Commercial (Qld)	2:03.32; CR	Felicity Galvez; SOPAC (NSW)	2:04.09	Amy Smith; St. Peters Western (Qld)	2:04.79
100 m individual medley	Emily Seebohm; Brothers (Qld)	58.54; WR	Sally Foster; Central Aquatic (WA)	59.54	Tiffany Papaemanouil; Norwood (SA)	1:00.47
200 m individual medley	Emily Seebohm; Brothers (Qld)	2:08.09; AR	Ellen Fullerton; Pro-Ma Miami (Qld)	2:09.17	Alicia Coutts; Redlands (Qld)	2:09.23
400 m individual medley	Ellen Fullerton; Pro-Ma Miami (Qld)	4:28.72; AR	Samantha Hamill; Kawana Waters (Qld)	4:31.24	Blair Evans; City of Perth (WA)	4:36.48
4 × 100 m freestyle relay	St. Peters Western (Qld); Yolane Kukla; Jessica Henshaw; Rachael Gorrie; Amy Smith	3:40.79	Pro-Ma Miami 'A' (Qld); Melanie Durso; Amy Levings; Katie Goldman; Ellen Fullerton	3:41.36	Nunawading 'A' (Vic); Tayliah Zimmer; Belinda Parslow; Ellese Zalewski; Belinda Bennett	3:41.90
4 × 200 m freestyle relay	Pro-Ma Miami 'A' (Qld); Amy Levings; Katie Goldman; Melanie Durso; Ellen Fullerton	7:57.39	Nunawading 'A' (Vic); Ellese Zalewski; Belinda Parslow; Chelsea Carpenter; Belinda Bennett	7:59.53	St. Peters Western (Qld); Amy Smith; Yolane Kukla; Rachael Gorrie; Samantha Hoschke-Edwards	8:05.12
4 × 100 m medley relay	Nunawading 'A' (Vic); Tayliah Zimmer; Leisel Jones; Ellese Zalewski; Belinda Parslow	3:57.24	Commercial 'A' (Qld); Bridgette-Rose Taylor; Mikkayla Maselli-Sheridan; Jessicah Schipper; Sophie Edington	4:02.66	St. Peters Western (Qld); Rachael Gorrie; Tess David; Amy Smith; Yolane Kukla	4:04.00

Legend: WR – World record; CR – Commonwealth record; OR – Oceanian record; AR – Australian record; ACR – Australian All Comers record; Club – Australian Club record

== Points table ==
Place	Club	Points
1	Nunawading (Vic)	1521.5
2	Commercial	789
3	Norwood (SA)	618
4	Pro-Ma Miami (Qld)	523.5
5	Melbourne Vicentre (Vic)	457.5
6	St. Peters Western (Qld)	396
7	SOPAC Swim Club (NSW)	328.5
8	Hunter (NSW)	311
9	Redcliffe Leagues (Qld)	287
10	Brothers (Qld)	287

Full points listing:

== See also ==
- 2009 in swimming
- 2009 Australian Swimming Championships
