= 2014 Australian Swimming Championships =

- Host city: Brisbane, Queensland
- Date: 1–6 April
- Venue: Brisbane Aquatic Centre
- Events: 40 (men: 20; women: 20)

The 2014 Australian Swimming Championships were held from 1 to 6 April 2014 at the Brisbane Aquatic Centre in Brisbane, Queensland, Australia. They doubled up as the national trials for the Glasgow 2014 Commonwealth Games.

== Qualification criteria ==
Below were the entry qualifying times for each event that had to be achieved after 1 January 2013 in a 50m pool.

Event	Men	Women
50m freestyle	24.30	27.20
100m freestyle	52.50	58.10
200m freestyle	1:55.80	2:07.20
400m freestyle	4:07.00	4:27.00
800m freestyle	8:37.00	9:02.00
1500m freestyle	16:00.00	17:45.00
50m backstroke	28.50	31.80
100m backstroke	1:01.00	1:07.20
200m backstroke	2:12.50	2:24.00
50m breaststroke	31.60	36.00
100m breaststroke	1:08.80	1:17.00
200m breaststroke	2:29.60	2:45.00
50m butterfly	25.80	29.50
100m butterfly	58.00	1:05.10
200m butterfly	2:08.80	2:23.00
200m IM	2:13.30	2:26.50
400m IM	4:42.00	5:05.00
4×100 m freestyle relay	3:37.00	4:09.00
4×200 m freestyle relay	8:00.00	8:45.00
4×100 m medley relay	4:05.00	4:35.00

Below were the Swimming Australia A and B qualifying times for the 2014 Commonwealth Games for each event.

Event	Men		Women	
Event	A	B	A	B
50m freestyle	21.74	22.33	24.91	25.34
100m freestyle	48.46	48.93	54.09	54.86
200m freestyle	1:47.31	1:48.42	1:56.76	1:58.74
400m freestyle	3:47.86	3:49.55	4:06.02	4:09.81
800m freestyle			8:27.41	8:34.33
1500m freestyle	15:00.48	15:14.38		
100m backstroke	53.81	54.43	1:00.24	1:01.39
200m backstroke	1:57.37	1:58.48	2:09.84	2:11.09
100m breaststroke	59.92	1:00.86	1:07.12	1:08.63
200m breaststroke	2:10.01	2:12.78	2:24.68	2:27.88
100m butterfly	51.78	52.57	58.44	58.89
200m butterfly	1:56.10	1:57.03	2:07.86	2:09.38
200m IM	1:58.17	1:59.99	2:11.21	2:14.97
400m IM	4:15.81	4:18.99	4:37.77	4:44.53

== Medal winners ==
=== Men's events ===
Event	Gold		Silver		Bronze	
50 m freestyle	Eamon Sullivan; Unattached (WA)	21.90	Cameron McEvoy; Palm Beach Currumbin (Qld)	21.97	James Magnussen; SOPAC (NSW); Matthew Abood; Sydney University (NSW)	22.02
100 m freestyle	Cameron McEvoy; Palm Beach Currumbin (Qld)	47.65	James Magnussen; SOPAC (NSW)	47.92	Tommaso D'Orsogna; Commercial (Qld)	48.72
200 m freestyle	Cameron McEvoy; Palm Beach Currumbin (Qld)	1:45.46	Thomas Fraser-Holmes; Miami (Qld)	1:45.58	David McKeon; Wests Illawarra (NSW)	1:46.37
400 m freestyle	David McKeon; Wests Illawarra (NSW)	3:43.72	Mack Horton; Melbourne Vicentre (Vic)	3:44.60; WJR	Jordan Harrison; Miami (Qld)	3:47.42
800 m freestyle	David McKeon; Wests Illawarra (NSW)	7:54.29	Jack McLoughlin; Nudgee Brothers (Qld)	8:02.27	Lachlan Colquhourn; TSS Aquatic (Qld)	8:13.36
1500 m freestyle	Mack Horton; Melbourne Vicentre (Vic)	14:51.55; WJR	Jordan Harrison; Miami (Qld)	15:03.24	Matthew Levings; Miami (Qld)	15:09.67
50 m backstroke	Benjamin Treffers; Burley Griffin (ACT)	24.54; OC	Bobby Hurley; Trinity Grammar (NSW)	25.19	Daniel Arnamnart; SOPAC (NSW)	25.28
100 m backstroke	Mitch Larkin; St Peters Western (Qld)	53.46	Benjamin Treffers; Burley Griffin (ACT)	53.73	Josh Beaver; Tigersharks (Vic)	53.84
200 m backstroke	Mitch Larkin; St Peters Western (Qld)	1:55.26; CR	Matson Lawson; Tigersharks (Vic)	1:56.35	Josh Beaver; Tigersharks (Vic)	1:56.83
50 m breaststroke	Christian Sprenger; Commercial (Qld)	26.74; OC, ACR	Max Ireland; Nunawading (Vic)	28.07	Tommy Sucipto; Leisurepark Lazers (WA)	28.18
100 m breaststroke	Christian Sprenger; Commercial (Qld)	58.87; ACR	Jake Packard; Indooroopilly (Qld)	1:01.38	Buster Sykes; Nudgee Brothers (Qld)	1:01.73
200 m breaststroke	Christian Sprenger; Commercial (Qld)	2:08.63	Daniel Tranter; SOPAC (NSW)	2:12.26	Buster Sykes; Nudgee Brothers (Qld)	2:12.95
50 m butterfly	Nathaniel Romeo; Sydney University A (NSW)	23.83	Kyle Chalmers; Marion (SA)	24.03	Chris Wright; Southport Olympic (Qld)	24.07
100 m butterfly	Chris Wright; Southport Olympic (Qld)	52.16	Tommaso D'Orsogna; Commercial (Qld)	52.21	Jayden Hadler; SOPAC (NSW)	52.33
200 m butterfly	Grant Irvine; St Peters Western (Qld)	1:56.23	Mitchell Pratt; Tigersharks (Vic)	1:57.00	Daniel Tranter; SOPAC (NSW)	1:57.48
200 m IM	Daniel Tranter; SOPAC (NSW)	1:57.66	Thomas Fraser-Holmes; Miami (Qld)	1:57.88	Mitch Larkin; St Peters Western (Qld)	1:59.29
400 m IM	Thomas Fraser-Holmes; Miami (Qld)	4:10.68	Travis Mahoney; Nunawading (Vic)	4:17.39	Jared Gilliland; Nudgee Brothers (Qld)	4:17.77
4×100 m freestyle relay	Sydney University A (NSW); Erik van Dooren (51.28); Te Haumi Maxwell (50.65); Andrew Abood (49.57); Matthew Abood (48.79)	3:20.29	Nunawading A (Vic); Shane Asbury (51.09); Ashley Delaney (50.16); Dylan Warren (52.16); Travis Mahoney (49.50)	3:22.91	Sydney University B (NSW); Nicholas Rispoli (51.63); Nathaniel Romeo (50.53); Ben Lindsay (50.91); Jacob Hansford (51.76)	3:24.83
4×200 m freestyle relay	Miami A (Qld); Jarrod Killey (1:49.31); Daniel Smith (1:47.10); Jordan Harrison (1:49.80); Thomas Fraser-Holmes (1:46.82)	7:13.03; Club	TSS Aquatic A (Qld); David Morgan (1:51.97); Joshua Parrish (1:52.14); Dominic Richardson (1:52.88); Ray Bornman (1:51.50)	7:28.49	Melbourne Vicentre A (Vic); Jack Gerrard (1:53.39); Mitchell Davenport-Wright (1:52.96); Zac Charlton (1:54.24); Mack Horton (1:49.37)	7:29.96
4×100 m medley relay	Trinity Grammar A (NSW); Bobby Hurley (54.53); Matthew Treloar (1:02.99); Kenneth To (53.01); Ben Schafer (50.59)	3:41.12	Nunawading A (Vic); Ashley Delaney (54.58); Max Ireland (1:03.16); Shane Asbury (55.03); Travis Mahoney (48.86)	3:41.63	Sydney University A (NSW); Te Haumi Maxwell (58.01); Jessie King (1:03.83); Nathaniel Romeo (52.82); Matthew Abood (48.61)	3:43.27

Legend: WR – World record; WJR – World Junior record; CR – Commonwealth record; OR – Oceanian record; AR – Australian record; ACR – Australian All Comers record; Club – Australian Club record

=== Women's events ===
Event	Gold		Silver		Bronze	
50 m freestyle	Cate Campbell; Commercial (Qld)	24.18	Bronte Campbell; Commercial (Qld)	24.58	Melanie Schlanger; Southport (Qld)	24.82
100 m freestyle	Cate Campbell; Commercial (Qld)	52.68; ACR	Bronte Campbell; Commercial (Qld)	53.02	Emma McKeon; Wests Illawarra (NSW)	53.57
200 m freestyle	Emma McKeon; Wests Illawarra (NSW)	1:55.68; OR	Bronte Barratt; St Peters Western (Qld)	1:56.61	Brittany Elmslie; St Peters Western (Qld)	1:57.64
400 m freestyle	Bronte Barratt; St Peters Western (Qld)	4:04.56	Remy Fairweather; Pelican Waters (Qld)	4:06.02; WJR	Jessica Ashwood; SOPAC (NSW)	4:07.30
800 m freestyle	Jessica Ashwood; SOPAC (NSW)	8:22.51	Alanna Bowles; Rocky City (Qld)	8:30.52	Laura Crockart; Ryde Carlile (NSW)	8:31.84
1500 m freestyle	Laura Crockart; Ryde Carlile (NSW)	16:17.36	Chelsea Gubecka; Kawana Waters (Qld)	16:23.41	Kareena Lee; Mountain Creek (Qld)	16:24.81
50 m backstroke	Emily Seebohm; Nudgee Brothers (Qld)	27.95	Meagen Nay; St Peters Western (Qld)	28.66	Madison Wilson; St Peters Western (Qld)	28.67
100 m backstroke	Emily Seebohm; Nudgee Brothers (Qld)	58.92; ACR	Belinda Hocking; Nunawading (Vic)	59.83	Meagen Nay; St Peters Western (Qld)	59.90
200 m backstroke	Belinda Hocking; Nunawading (Vic)	2:07.52	Emily Seebohm; Nudgee Brothers (Qld)	2:08.28	Meagen Nay; St Peters Western (Qld)	2:08.44
50 m breaststroke	Leiston Pickett; Southport Olympic (Qld)	30.89	Sally Hunter; Marion (SA)	31.18	Lorna Tonks; Indooroopilly (Qld)	31.27
100 m breaststroke	Lorna Tonks; Indooroopilly (Qld)	1:07.31	Leiston Pickett; Southport Olympic (Qld)	1:07.56	Sally Hunter; Marion (SA)	1:07.73
200 m breaststroke	Taylor McKeown; Indooroopilly (Qld)	2:22.10	Sally Hunter; Marion (SA)	2:24.91	Tessa Wallace; Pelican Waters (Qld)	2:25.29
50 m butterfly	Marieke D'Cruz; SOPAC (NSW)	26.20	Alicia Coutts; Redlands (Qld)	26.36	Brittany Elmslie; St Peters Western (Qld)	26.50
100 m butterfly	Alicia Coutts; Redlands (Qld)	57.70	Ellen Gandy; Nunawading (Vic)	57.98	Emma McKeon; Wests Illawarra (NSW)	57.99
200 m butterfly	Madeline Groves; St Peters Western (Qld)	2:06.95	Ellen Gandy; Nunawading (Vic)	2:08.60	Brianna Throssell; Perth City (WA)	2:09.83
200 m IM	Alicia Coutts; Redlands (Qld)	2:08.89	Emily Seebohm; Nudgee Brothers (Qld)	2:11.25	Kotuku Ngawati; Melbourne Vicentre (Vic)	2:13.08
400 m IM	Keryn McMaster; Waterworx (Qld)	4:39.69	Ellen Gandy; Nunawading (Vic)	4:41.11	Jessica Pengelly; West Coast (WA)	4:44.32
4×100 m freestyle relay	Nudgee Brothers A (Qld); Emily Seebohm (55.76); Ellen Fullerton (56.31); Lizzie Gannon (56.80); Mikkayla Sheridan (55.57)	3:44.44	Sydney University A (NSW); Melissa Mitchell (55.18); Alicia Caldwell (56.58); Hayley Abood (57.99); Nicole Mee (56.97)	3:46.72	Nunawading A (Vic); Shani Burleigh (57.65); Ellese Zalewski (56.68); Belinda Hocking (58.27); Ellen Gandy (56.73)	3:49.33
4×200 m freestyle relay	TSS Aquatic A (Qld); Kelly Marquenie (2:02.83); Melanie Garibaldi (2:02.52); Celine Garibaldi (2:05.58); Kiah Melverton (2:03.67)	8:14.60	Nunawading A (Vic); Eliza Ham (2:09.62); Stephanie Moore (2:06.01); Evelyn Boldt (2:07.16); Kate Laidlaw (2:12.60)	8:35.39	None awarded	
4×100 m medley relay	Nunawading A (Vic); Belinda Hocking (1:01.30); Jessica Hansen (1:08.72); Ellen Gandy (59.59); Ellese Zalewski (56.36)	4:05.97	Sydney University A (NSW); Hayley Abood (1:01.99); Meagan Ramsay (1:13.56); Nicole Mee (1:01.23); Melissa Mitchell (54.77)	4:11.55	Melbourne Vicentre A (Vic); Hayley Baker (1:03.72); Samantha Marshall (1:09.88); Christina Licciardi (1:02.38); Kotuku Ngawati (56.20)	4:12.18

Legend: WR – World record; WJR – World Junior record; CR – Commonwealth record; OR – Oceanian record; AR – Australian record; ACR – Australian All Comers record; Club – Australian Club record
