= 2014 Australian Short Course Swimming Championships =

- Host city: Adelaide, South Australia
- Date: 5–9 November
- Venue: South Australia Aquatic and Leisure Centre
- Events: 63 (men: 31; women: 31; mixed: 1)

The 2014 Australian Short Course Swimming Championships were held from 5 to 9 November 2014 at the South Australia Aquatic and Leisure Centre in Adelaide, South Australia. They doubled up as the national trials for the 2014 FINA World Swimming Championships (25 m) in Doha, Qatar.

== Events ==
A total of 63 events (31 each for men and women and 1 mixed event) were contested:

- Freestyle: 50, 100, 200, 400, 800 and 1,500;
- Backstroke: 50, 100 and 200;
- Breaststroke: 50, 100 and 200;
- Butterfly: 50, 100 and 200;
- Individual medley: 100, 200 and 400;
- Relays: 4×100 free, 4×200 free; 4×100 medley

=== Schedule ===
Legend
Key	H	½	F	TF
Value	Heats	Semifinals	Final	Timed final

M = Morning session, E = Evening session

Men
Date →	Nov 5		Nov 6		Nov 7		Nov 8		Nov 9	
Event ↓	M	E	M	E	M	E	M	E	M	E
50 m freestyle			H	½		F				
100 m freestyle							H	½		F
200 m freestyle	H	F								
400 m freestyle					H	F				
800 m freestyle	TF									
1500 m freestyle									TF	TF
50 m backstroke					H	½		F		
100 m backstroke	H	½		F						
200 m backstroke									H	F
50 m breaststroke							H	½		F
100 m breaststroke	H	½		F						
200 m breaststroke					H	F				
50 m butterfly					H	½		F		
100 m butterfly	H	½		F						
200 m butterfly									H	F
100 m individual medley							H	½		F
200 m individual medley					H	F				
400 m individual medley			H	F						
4 × 100 m freestyle relay		TF								
4 × 200 m freestyle relay				TF						
4 × 100 m medley relay										TF

Men's multiclass
Date →	Nov 5		Nov 6		Nov 7		Nov 8		Nov 9	
Event ↓	M	E	M	E	M	E	M	E	M	E
50 m freestyle							H	F		
100 m freestyle					H	F				
400 m freestyle	TF									
50 m backstroke									H	F
100 m backstroke					H	F				
50 m breaststroke	H	F								
100 m breaststroke							H	F		
50 m butterfly			H	F						
100 m butterfly									H	F
200 m individual medley			H	F						

Women
Date →	Nov 5		Nov 6		Nov 7		Nov 8		Nov 9	
Event ↓	M	E	M	E	M	E	M	E	M	E
50 m freestyle							H	½		F
100 m freestyle			H	½		F				
200 m freestyle									H	F
400 m freestyle					H	F				
800 m freestyle			TF	TF						
1500 m freestyle									TF	
50 m backstroke							H	½		F
100 m backstroke	H	½		F						
200 m backstroke					H	F				
50 m breaststroke	H	½		F						
100 m breaststroke					H	½		F		
200 m breaststroke									H	F
50 m butterfly			H	½		F				
100 m butterfly							H	½		F
200 m butterfly	H	F								
100 m individual medley			H	½		F				
200 m individual medley							H	F		
400 m individual medley	H	F								
4 × 100 m freestyle relay								TF		
4 × 200 m freestyle relay		TF								
4 × 100 m medley relay						TF				

Women's multiclass
Date →	Nov 5		Nov 6		Nov 7		Nov 8		Nov 9	
Event ↓	M	E	M	E	M	E	M	E	M	E
50 m freestyle							H	F		
100 m freestyle					H	F				
400 m freestyle			TF							
50 m backstroke									H	F
100 m backstroke					H	F				
50 m breaststroke	H	F								
100 m breaststroke							H	F		
50 m butterfly			H	F						
100 m butterfly									H	F
200 m individual medley			H	F						

Mixed multiclass
Date →	Nov 5		Nov 6		Nov 7		Nov 8		Nov 9	
Event ↓	M	E	M	E	M	E	M	E	M	E
150 m individual medley									TF	

== Qualification criteria ==
Below were the entry qualifying times for each event that had to be achieved after 1 January 2013 in a 25-metre pool. A time in a 50-metre pool could only be used without a conversion factor when a short course time was not available. Entrants had to be a minimum of 12 years of age as of the first day of the meet.

Qualification times
Event	Men	Women
50 m freestyle	23.80	26.80
100 m freestyle	51.00	58.00
200 m freestyle	1:54.20	2:05.00
400 m freestyle	4:00.00	4:20.00
800 m freestyle	8:29.00	8:55.00
1500 m freestyle	15:52.00	17:28.00
50 m backstroke	27.70	30.90
100 m backstroke	59.80	1:05.50
200 m backstroke	2:09.00	2:21.00
50 m breaststroke	30.80	35.00
100 m breaststroke	1:07.50	1:15.50
200 m breaststroke	2:28.60	2:40.00
50 m butterfly	25.90	29.10
100 m butterfly	57.70	1:05.00
200 m butterfly	2:08.00	2:23.00
100 m individual medley	1:00.00	1:07.00
200 m individual medley	2:11.00	2:24.00
400 m individual medley	4:36.00	5:00.00
4 × 100 m freestyle relay	3:32.00	3:56.00
4 × 200 m freestyle relay	7:47.00	8:26.00
4 × 100 m medley relay	3:55.00	4:30.00

Below were the men's entry multiclass qualifying times for each event.

Qualification times for the men's freestyle, backstroke and butterfly multiclass events
Event	S16	S15	S14	S13	S12	S11	S10	S9	S8	S7	S6	S5	S4	S3	S2	S1
50 m freestyle	34.33	29.78	30.98	30.54	30.06	34.90	28.27	30.81	32.87	34.37	37.92	45.42	54.29	1:22.98	1:37.75	2:22.78
100 m freestyle	1:15.13	1:04.53	1:08.29	1:07.43	1:05.50	1:16.41	1:01.36	1:07.72	1:12.08	1:16.06	1:20.55	1:36.73	1:57.75	2:56.49	3:26.37	5:56.02
400 m freestyle	6:15.76	4:56.94	5:25.63	5:20.98	5:10.47	5:58.49	4:55.54	5:16.64	5:27.81	6:06.80	5:56.10	—N/a				
50 m backstroke	39.35	35.55	37.91	35.86	35.59	42.48	34.93	34.84	38.64	42.50	45.08	49.75	1:06.96	1:26.83	1:38.77	2:27.95
100 m backstroke	1:29.62	1:13.47	1:20.31	1:14.71	1:12.50	1:32.08	1:12.18	1:12.99	1:19.60	1:29.63	1:33.89	1:45.15	2:48.33	2:59.58	3:45.67	4:48.26
50 m butterfly	37.66	32.28	34.58	33.50	34.16	38.81	32.14	33.53	34.64	39.94	39.54	48.27	1:05.90	1:57.74	3:14.13	2:56.48
100 m butterfly	—N/a	1:09.12	1:16.21	1:11.87	1:13.44	1:24.44	1:08.99	1:13.45	1:15.48	1:37.01	1:42.52	2:26.06	—N/a			

Qualification times for the men's breaststroke multiclass events
Event	SB16	SB15	SB14	SB13	SB12	SB11	SB9	SB8	SB7	SB6	SB5	SB4	SB3	SB2	SB1
50 m breaststroke	41.40	36.17	37.46	38.45	40.24	43.64	37.84	41.68	46.44	49.38	59.37	1:02.69	1:12.08	1:30.69	2:23.90
100 m breaststroke	1:45.76	1:17.36	1:21.92	1:23.58	1:25.33	1:34.90	1:20.12	1:28.85	1:38.16	1:43.87	2:10.22	2:09.82	2:43.99	3:27.21	—N/a

Qualification times for the men's individual medley multiclass events
Event	SM16	SM15	SM14	SM13	SM12	SM11	SM10	SM9	SM8	SM7	SM6	SM5	SM4	SM3	SM2	SM1
200 m individual medley	3:26.03	2:29.48	2:52.17	2:50.74	2:44.58	3:15.36	2:36.29	2:43.40	2:52.81	3:14.42	3:23.15	3:55.47	—N/a			

Below were the women's entry multiclass qualifying times for each event.

Qualification times for the women's freestyle, backstroke and butterfly multiclass events
Event	S16	S15	S14	S13	S12	S11	S10	S9	S8	S7	S6	S5	S4	S3	S2	S1
50 m freestyle	39.07	33.17	36.80	34.89	33.44	40.76	35.76	36.31	39.99	40.53	46.21	53.06	1:12.98	1:39.55	1:56.14	2:03.37
100 m freestyle	1:28.26	1:11.61	1:18.67	1:15.62	1:13.83	1:26.30	1:18.72	1:18.05	1:25.60	1:26.38	1:37.78	2:00.36	2:31.60	3:24.43	4:39.67	4:21.85
400 m freestyle	7:23.64	5:45.89	5:58.11	5:46.50	5:54.39	6:39.77	5:50.38	5:51.32	6:01.04	6:28.72	6:58.86	—N/a				
50 m backstroke	47.55	39.18	40.78	42.74	43.56	46.15	41.93	40.96	46.73	45.41	53.82	1:00.51	1:17.49	1:37.72	2:06.14	2:10.10
100 m backstroke	1:46.85	1:24.87	1:25.91	1:28.90	1:27.85	1:40.74	1:25.51	1:25.46	1:36.51	1:34.46	1:51.75	2:15.14	2:45.21	3:29.03	4:21.70	4:28.14
50 m butterfly	43.01	36.53	39.55	38.64	38.09	45.67	40.49	39.85	42.96	44.31	48.96	1:00.96	1:20.10	1:51.41	—N/a	
100 m butterfly	—N/a	1:20.95	1:27.50	1:23.31	1:22.02	1:41.25	1:26.86	1:24.68	1:31.02	1:49.00	1:58.24	2:35.12	—N/a			

Qualification times for the women's breaststroke multiclass events
Event	SB16	SB15	SB14	SB13	SB12	SB11	SB9	SB8	SB7	SB6	SB5	SB4	SB3	SB2	SB1
50 m breaststroke	49.59	45.03	45.65	44.40	51.27	52.61	48.13	46.84	52.10	57.97	1:01.77	1:25.11	1:27.78	1:59.80	3:58.68
100 m breaststroke	1:51.38	1:37.01	1:41.75	1:35.02	1:33.71	1:51.44	1:42.05	1:35.17	1:49.42	2:04.51	2:15.23	2:44.36	3:16.46	4:12.92	—N/a

Qualification times for the women's individual medley multiclass events
Event	SM16	SM15	SM14	SM13	SM12	SM11	SM10	SM9	SM8	SM7	SM6	SM5	SM4	SM3	SM2	SM1
200 m individual medley	3:55.48	3:07.72	3:14.28	3:06.63	3:08.50	3:35.79	3:11.85	3:07.14	3:16.33	3:38.05	3:57.87	5:22.72	—N/a			

== Medal winners ==
Key
Symbol	Meaning
CR	Commonwealth record
OC	Oceanian record
ACR	Australian All Comers record
Club	Australian Club record

=== Men's events ===
Event	Gold		Silver		Bronze	
50 m freestyle	Matthew Abood; Sydney University (NSW)	21.32	Cameron McEvoy; Palm Beach Currumbin (Qld)	21.33	Te Haumi Maxwell; Sydney University (NSW)	21.69
100 m freestyle	Cameron McEvoy; Palm Beach Currumbin (Qld)	46.85	Tommaso D'Orsogna; Commercial (Qld)	46.86	Matthew Abood; Sydney University (NSW)	47.14
200 m freestyle	Cameron McEvoy; Palm Beach Currumbin (Qld)	1:43.09	David McKeon; Chandler (Qld)	1:43.43	Daniel Smith; Miami (Qld)	1:43.50
400 m freestyle	David McKeon; Chandler (Qld)	3:38.17	Jordan Harrison; Miami (Qld)	3:39.27	Daniel Smith; Miami (Qld)	3:40.47
800 m freestyle	Matthew Levings; Miami (Qld)	7:46.96	Jack McLoughlin; Nudgee Brothers (Qld)	7:48.57	Alexander Graudins; Miami (Qld)	7:49.04
1500 m freestyle	Jordan Harrison; Miami (Qld)	14:26.21	Jack McLoughlin; Nudgee Brothers (Qld)	14:44.89	Jarrod Poort; Wests Illawarra (NSW)	14:51.08
50 m backstroke	Mitch Larkin; St Peters Western (Qld)	23.33	Bobby Hurley; Trinity Grammar (NSW)	23.46	Benjamin Treffers; Burley Griffin (ACT)	23.61
100 m backstroke	Mitch Larkin; St Peters Western (Qld)	49.25; CR, ACR	Bobby Hurley; Trinity Grammar (NSW)	50.20	Ashley Delaney; Nunawading (Vic)	51.30
200 m backstroke	Mitch Larkin; St Peters Western (Qld)	1:47.72; OC, ACR	Matson Lawson; Tigersharks (Vic)	1:54.03	Travis Mahoney; Nunawading (Vic)	1:54.40
50 m breaststroke	Michal Zawadka; Poland	26.92	Joshua Palmer; Marion (SA)	26.96	Tommy Sucipto; Leisurepark Lazers (WA); Jake Packard; Indooroopilly (Qld)	26.97
100 m breaststroke	Jake Packard; Indooroopilly (Qld)	57.92	Tommy Sucipto; Leisurepark Lazers (WA)	58.33	Joshua Palmer; Marion (SA)	59.08
200 m breaststroke	Jake Packard; Indooroopilly (Qld)	2:07.38	Lennard Bremer; Westside Christchurch (WA)	2:07.45	Thomas Fraser-Holmes; Miami (Qld)	2:07.46
50 m butterfly	Jayden Hadler; Commercial (Qld)	23.06	Tommaso D'Orsogna; Commercial (Qld)	23.13	Daniel Lester; Lawnton (Qld)	23.14
100 m butterfly	David Morgan; TSS Aquatic (Qld)	50.77	Tommaso D'Orsogna; Commercial (Qld)	50.80	Grant Irvine; St Peters Western (Qld)	50.84
200 m butterfly	Grant Irvine; St Peters Western (Qld)	1:52.37	Thomas Fraser-Holmes; Miami (Qld)	1:53.53	David Morgan; TSS Aquatic (Qld)	1:54.62
100 m individual medley	Daniel Lester; Lawnton (Qld)	52.65	Justin James; Mackay (Qld)	53.20	Buster Sykes; Nudgee Brothers (Qld)	54.24
200 m individual medley	Thomas Fraser-Holmes; Miami (Qld)	1:54.86	Justin James; Mackay (Qld)	1:55.29	Travis Mahoney; Nunawading (Vic)	1:55.32
400 m individual medley	Travis Mahoney; Nunawading (Vic)	4:04.96	Jared Gilliland; Nudgee Brothers (Qld)	4:08.26	Tomas Elliott; SOPAC (NSW)	4:11.17
4 × 100 m freestyle relay	Sydney University A (NSW); Te Haumi Maxwell (48.90); Andrew Abood (47.94); Benjamin Lindsay (49.46); Matthew Abood (47.09)	3:13.39	Marion A (SA); Hayden Lewis (50.41); Rian Pate (49.87); Ben Edmonds (49.44); Kyle Chalmers (47.16)	3:16.88	Nudgee Brothers A (Qld); Buster Sykes (48.98); Jack McLoughlin (48.69); Jared Gilliland (48.86); Douglas Oliver (50.62)	3:17.15
4 × 200 m freestyle relay	Miami A (Qld); Daniel Smith (1:44.22); Thomas Fraser-Holmes (1:43.02); Alexander Graudins (1:47.96); Jordan Harrison (1:45.00)	7:13.03; Club	Nudgee Brothers A (Qld); Jack McLoughlin (1:46.88); Jared Gilliland (1:49.13); Douglas Oliver (1:52.07); Buster Sykes (1:45.79)	7:13.87	Marion A (SA); Kyle Chalmers (1:47.61); Rian Pate (1:49.42); Hayden Lewis (1:49.80); Ben Edmonds (1:47.07)	7:13.90
4 × 100 m medley relay	Sydney University A (NSW); Te Haumi Maxwell (52.15); Daniel Tranter (59.69); Keiran Qaium (51.96); Matthew Abood (47.34)	3:31.14	Marion A (SA); Ben Edmonds (53.02); Joshua Palmer (58.36); Kyle Chalmers (52.22); Hayden Lewis (49.27)	3:32.87	Nudgee Brothers A (Qld); Douglas Oliver (54.61); Buster Sykes (59.99); Jared Gilliland (53.02); Jack McLoughlin (49.62)	3:37.24

=== Men's multiclass events ===
Event	Gold		Silver		Bronze	
50 m freestyle	Grant Patterson (S3); Cairns Central (Qld)	52.62	Mitchell Kilduff (S14); Menai (NSW)	24.27	Tim Antalfy (S13); Hunters Hill (NSW)	24.02
100 m freestyle	Grant Patterson (S3); Cairns Central (Qld)	1:52.31	Rowan Crothers (S9); Yeronga Park (Qld)	52.77	Joshua Alford (S14); Tuggeranong Vikings (NSW)	54.21
400 m freestyle	Rowan Crothers (S9); Yeronga Park (Qld)	4:06.26	Jacob Templeton (S13); Devonport (Tas)	4:15.15	Mitchell Kilduff (S14); Menai (NSW)	4:20.68
50 m backstroke	Mitchell Kilduff (S14); Menai (NSW)	29.81	Sean Russo (S13); Menai (NSW)	27.42	Grant Patterson (S3); Cairns Central (Qld)	58.86
100 m backstroke	Sean Russo (S13); Menai (NSW)	58.87	Ahmed Kelly (SM4); Melbourne Vicentre (Vic)	1:59.23	Jacob Templeton (S13); Devonport (Tas)	1:02.40
50 m breaststroke	Timothy Disken (SB8); PLC Aquatic (Vic)	32.82	Mitchell Kilduff (SB14); Menai (NSW)	31.41	Liam Bekric (SB12); Norwood (SA)	33.76
100 m breaststroke	Grant Patterson (SB2); Cairns Central (Qld)	2:18.82	Timothy Disken (SB8); PLC Aquatic (Vic)	1:11.71	Ahmed Kelly (SB3); Melbourne Vicentre (Vic)	1:49.77
50 m butterfly	Tim Antalfy (S13); Hunters Hill (NSW)	24.60	Mitchell Kilduff (S14); Menai (NSW)	26.21	Matt Cowdrey (S9); Marion (SA)	27.26
100 m butterfly	Mitchell Kilduff (S14); Menai (NSW)	57.39	Tim Antalfy (S13); Hunters Hill (NSW)	55.80	Joshua Alford (S14); Tuggeranong Vikings (NSW)	1:01.42
200 m individual medley	Joshua Alford (SM14); Tuggeranong Vikings (NSW)	2:16.83	Sean Russo (SM13); Menai (NSW)	2:13.98	Jacob Templeton (SM13); Devonport (Tas)	2:16.17

=== Women's events ===
Event	Gold		Silver		Bronze	
50 m freestyle	Bronte Campbell; Commercial (Qld)	23.88	Brittany Elmslie; St Peters Western (Qld)	24.47	Marieke D'Cruz; SOPAC (NSW)	24.54
100 m freestyle	Emma McKeon; Chandler (Qld)	51.83	Bronte Campbell; Commercial (Qld)	52.14	Brittany Elmslie; St Peters Western (Qld)	52.66
200 m freestyle	Emma McKeon; Chandler (Qld)	1:52.59; ACR	Kylie Palmer; Indooroopilly (Qld)	1:54.05	Brittany Elmslie; St Peters Western (Qld)	1:54.44
400 m freestyle	Emma McKeon; Chandler (Qld)	4:00.63	Jessica Ashwood; Chandler (Qld)	4:01.76	Leah Neale; Indooroopilly (Qld)	4:02.24
800 m freestyle	Brianna Throssell; Perth City (WA)	8:16.19	Jessica Ashwood; Chandler (Qld)	8:16.77	Katie Goldman; St Peters Western (Qld)	8:19.44
1500 m freestyle	Jessica Ashwood; Chandler (Qld)	15:55.49	Hayley Anschau; SOPAC (NSW)	16:06.23	Kareena Lee; Mountain Creek (Qld)	16:15.80
50 m backstroke	Emily Seebohm; Nudgee Brothers (Qld)	26.39	Madison Wilson; St Peters Western (Qld)	26.74	Hayley Baker; Melbourne Vicentre (Vic)	27.40
100 m backstroke	Emily Seebohm; Nudgee Brothers (Qld)	55.47; CR, ACR	Madison Wilson; St Peters Western (Qld)	56.97	Hayley Baker; Melbourne Vicentre (Vic)	57.45
200 m backstroke	Madison Wilson; St Peters Western (Qld)	2:01.75	Emily Seebohm; Nudgee Brothers (Qld)	2:01.87	Mikkayla Sheridan; Nudgee Brothers (Qld)	2:04.65
50 m breaststroke	Leiston Pickett; Southport Olympic (Qld)	30.06	Georgia Bohl; St Peters Western (Qld)	30.19	Sally Hunter; Marion (SA)	30.40
100 m breaststroke	Leiston Pickett; Southport Olympic (Qld)	1:05.21	Sally Hunter; Marion (SA)	1:05.34	Jessica Hansen; Nunawading (Vic)	1:05.76
200 m breaststroke	Sally Hunter; Marion (SA)	2:20.05	Tessa Wallace; Pelican Waters (Qld)	2:23.38	Jessica Hansen; Nunawading (Vic)	2:23.71
50 m butterfly	Emma McKeon; Chandler (Qld)	25.78	Brittany Elmslie; St Peters Western (Qld)	25.87	Marieke D'Cruz; SOPAC (NSW)	25.95
100 m butterfly	Emma McKeon; Chandler (Qld)	56.21	Brittany Elmslie; St Peters Western (Qld)	57.06	Marieke D'Cruz; SOPAC (NSW)	57.49
200 m butterfly	Brianna Throssell; Perth City (WA)	2:04.73	Jordan White; SLC Aquadot (NSW)	2:08.88	Nicole Mee; University of NSW (NSW)	2:09.85
100 m individual medley	Emily Seebohm; Nudgee Brothers (Qld)	58.45	Kotuku Ngawati; Melbourne Vicentre (Vic)	1:00.06	Hayley Baker; Melbourne Vicentre (Vic)	1:00.19
200 m individual medley	Emily Seebohm; Nudgee Brothers (Qld)	2:07.54	Ellen Fullerton; Nudgee Brothers (Qld)	2:09.84	Aisling Scott; Indooroopilly (Qld)	2:10.26
400 m individual medley	Keryn McMaster; Waterworx (Qld)	4:29.24	Ellen Fullerton; Nudgee Brothers (Qld)	4:31.15	Jessica Pengelly; West Coast (WA)	4:37.06
4 × 100 m freestyle relay	Nudgee Brothers A (Qld); Ellen Fullerton (55.31); Mikkayla Sheridan (54.29); Lauren Rettie (56.07); Emily Seebohm (52.52)	3:38.19	St Peters Western A (Qld); Madison Wilson (52.91); Brittany Elmslie (52.58); Katie Goldman (57.30); Amy Forrester (55.78)	3:38.57	Melbourne Vicentre A (Vic); Hayley Baker (55.53); Christina Licciardi (58.16); Elyse Woods (54.63); Kotuku Ngawati (55.11)	3:43.43
4 × 200 m freestyle relay	St Peters Western A (Qld); Brittany Elmslie (1:54.72); Madison Wilson (1:56.50); Amy Forrester (2:01.43); Katie Goldman (2:00.25)	7:52.90; ACR, Club	Melbourne Vicentre A (Vic); Kotuku Ngawati (1:57.31); Hayley Baker (1:59.80); Elyse Woods (2:02.27); Sian Whittaker (2:01.02)	8:00.40	Nudgee Brothers A (Qld); Mikkayla Sheridan (1:57.49); Ellen Fullerton (2:03.60); Lauren Rettie (2:02.42); Emily Seebohm (2:02.50)	8:06.01
4 × 100 m medley relay	St Peters Western A (Qld); Madison Wilson (57.09); Georgia Bohl (1:06.00); Brittany Elmslie (58.26); Amy Forrester (56.30)	3:57.65	Nudgee Brothers A (Qld); Emily Seebohm (57.12); Ellen Fullerton (1:09.40); Mikkayla Sheridan (?); Lauren Rettie (?)	4:01.81	Marion A (SA); Zoe Williams (1:02.62); Sally Hunter (1:06.72); Ellysia Oldsen (1:00.82); Ella Bond (56.21)	4:06.37

=== Women's multiclass events ===
Event	Gold		Silver		Bronze	
50 m freestyle	Katherine Downie (S10); Westside Christchurch (WA)	28.80	Taylor Corry (S14); Nelson Bay (NSW)	28.25	Maddison Elliott (S8); Newcastle University (NSW)	30.88
100 m freestyle	Taylor Corry (S14); Nelson Bay (NSW)	1:01.13	Maddison Elliott (S8); Newcastle University (NSW)	1:07.54	Amy Cook (S14); SLC Aquadot (NSW)	1:04.21
400 m freestyle	Taylor Corry (S14); Nelson Bay (NSW)	4:39.75	Teneale Houghton (S15); Liverpool (NSW)	4:47.02	Lakeisha Patterson (S8); Kawana Waters (Qld)	5:04.06
50 m backstroke	Maddison Elliott (S8); Newcastle University (NSW)	36.40	Teneale Houghton (S15); Liverpool (NSW)	32.65	Katherine Downie (S10); Westside Christchurch (WA)	32.32
100 m backstroke	Taylor Corry (S14); Nelson Bay (NSW)	1:07.86	Katherine Downie (S10); Westside Christchurch (WA)	1:08.26	Ashleigh Cockburn (S9); Ginninderra (ACT)	1:11.51
50 m breaststroke	Madeleine Scott (SB9); Leisurepark Lazers (WA)	36.81	Katherine Downie (SB9); Westside Christchurch (WA)	37.61	Caitlyn Mackay (SB14); Warrnambool (Vic)	40.89
100 m breaststroke	Tanya Huebner (SB6); Melbourne Vicentre (Vic)	1:40.13	Madeleine Scott (SB9); Leisurepark Lazers (WA)	1:20.14	Taylor Corry (SB14); Nelson Bay (NSW)	1:26.55
50 m butterfly	Madeleine Scott (S9); Leisurepark Lazers (WA)	31.27	Maddison Elliott (S8); Newcastle University (NSW)	33.98	Jacqueline Freney (S7); Richmond Valley (NSW)	35.84
100 m butterfly	Madeleine Scott (S9); Leisurepark Lazers (WA)	1:09.58	Maddison Elliott (S8); Newcastle University (NSW)	1:16.45	Amy Cook (S14); SLC Aquadot (NSW)	1:13.95
200 m individual medley	Katherine Downie (SM10); Westside Christchurch (WA)	2:32.57	Jacqueline Freney (SM7); Richmond Valley (NSW)	2:53.90	Taylor Corry (SM14); Nelson Bay (NSW)	2:33.04

=== Mixed events ===
Event	Gold		Silver		Bronze
150 m individual medley	Grant Patterson (SM3); Cairns Central (Qld)	3:07.77	Ahmed Kelly (SM4); Melbourne Vicentre (Vic)	2:58.33	None awarded

== Team selection ==
A team of 20 was selected for the 2014 FINA World Swimming Championships (25 m) in Doha, Qatar. Matthew Abood, Bronte Campbell, Tommaso D'Orsogna, Ellen Fullerton, Katie Goldman, Jordan Harrison, Sally Hunter, Grant Irvine, Mitch Larkin, Travis Mahoney, Cameron McEvoy, David Morgan, Leah Neale, Jake Packard, Kylie Palmer, Leiston Pickett, Emily Seebohm, Daniel Smith, Brianna Throssell and Madison Wilson.
