= 2010 Australian Swimming Championships =

The 2010 Telstra Australian Swimming Championships were held from 16 March to 21 March 2010 in Sydney, New South Wales, Australia. They doubled as the national trials for the 2010 Commonwealth Games and 2010 Pan Pacific Swimming Championships.

== Medal winners ==
=== Men ===
Event	Gold		Silver		Bronze	
50 m freestyle	Ashley Callus	22.09	Cameron Prosser	22.36	Eamon Sullivan	22.38
100 m freestyle	Eamon Sullivan	48.52	Tommaso D'Orsogna	49.35	James Magnussen	49.43
200 m freestyle	Nic Ffrost	1:47.50	Thomas Fraser-Holmes	1:47.66	Kenrick Monk	1:47.83
400 m freestyle	Robert Hurley	3:47.67	Ryan Napoleon	3:48.70	Patrick Murphy	3:49.43
800 m freestyle	Robert Hurley	7:55.36	Ryan Napoleon	7:59.23	Christopher Ashwood	8:00.94
1500 m freestyle	Robert Hurley	15:00.96	Ryan Napoleon	15:14.96	Christopher Ashwood	15:19.39
50 m backstroke	Hayden Stoeckel	25.06	Daniel Arnamnart	25.08	Ben Treffers	25.09
100 m backstroke	Hayden Stoeckel	53.61	Ashley Delaney	54.07	Ben Treffers	55.00
200 m backstroke	Hayden Stoeckel	1:58.04	Ashley Delaney	1:58.56	Braiden Camm	2:00.51
50 m butterfly	Geoff Huegill	23.46	Andrew Lauterstein	23.82	Mitchell Patterson	23.89
100 m butterfly	Andrew Lauterstein	51.79	Chris Wright	52.49	Adam Pine	52.57
200 m butterfly	Nick D'Arcy	1:54.61	Chris Wright	1:56.23	Jayden Hadler	1:57.07
50 m breaststroke	Brenton Rickard	27.40	Christian Sprenger	27.95	Karl Wurzer	28.40
100 m breaststroke	Brenton Rickard	1:00.19	Christian Sprenger	1:00.91	Nicholas Schafer	1:02.40
200 m breaststroke	Brenton Rickard	2:09.31	Craig Calder	2:12.33	Christian Sprenger	2:12.71
200 m individual medley	Leith Brodie	1:59.60	Thomas Fraser-Holmes	2:00.84	Tommaso D'Orsogna	2:00.90
400 m individual medley	Thomas Fraser-Holmes	4:16.81	Jayden Hadler	4:20.79	Mitch Larkin	4:21.54

=== Women ===
Event	Gold		Silver		Bronze	
50 m freestyle	Yolane Kukla	25.08	Alice Mills	25.13	Cate Campbell	25.15
100 m freestyle	Emily Seebohm	54.70	Alicia Coutts	54.86	Alice Mills	55.32
200 m freestyle	Blair Evans	1:57.38	Bronte Barratt	1:57.46	Kylie Palmer	1:57.69
400 m freestyle	Bronte Barratt	4:05.50	Kylie Palmer	4:06.36	Katie Goldman	4:07.12
800 m freestyle	Katie Goldman	8:22.83	Blair Evans	8:25.74	Kylie Palmer	8:29.57
1500 m freestyle	Melissa Gorman	16:03.24	Kylie Palmer	16:41.71	Da DeFrancesco	16:46.58
50 m backstroke	Emily Seebohm	27.95	Sophie Edington	28.20	Grace Loh	28.52
100 m backstroke	Emily Seebohm	59.21	Belinda Hocking	1:00.11	Sophie Edington	1:01.20
200 m backstroke	Belinda Hocking	2:07.89	Meagen Nay	2:08.02	Emily Seebohm	2:08.19
50 m butterfly	Yolane Kukla	25.92	Marieke Guehrer	26.28	Emily Seebohm	26.47
100 m butterfly	Stephanie Rice	57.71	Felicity Galvez	58.20	Jessicah Schipper	58.41
200 m butterfly	Jessica Schipper	2:07.66	Samantha Hamill	2:07.75	Felicity Galvez	2:08.83
50 m breaststroke	Leisel Jones	30.87	Leiston Pickett	31.06	Sarah Katsoulis	31.12
100 m breaststroke	Leisel Jones	1:05.79	Samantha Marshall	1:07.45	Sarah Katsoulis	1:07.89
200 m breaststroke	Leisel Jones	2:23.45	Sarah Katsoulis	2:25.35	Tessa Wallace	2:28.67
200 m individual medley	Stephanie Rice	2:10.07	Emily Seebohm	2:10.75	Alicia Coutts	2:11.97
400 m individual medley	Stephanie Rice	4:35.04	Samantha Hamill	4:40.44	Blair Evans	4:40.49
