= Craig Jackson (swimmer) =

South African swimmer

Personal information
- Born: September 18, 1968 (age 57)

Sport
- Sport: Swimming

Craig Jackson (born 18 September 1968) is a former Olympic swimmer who represented South Africa in the 1992 Summer Olympics in Barcelona. He competed in the men's 100 metre butterfly, 200 metre butterfly and 4×100 metre freestyle relay.

Formerly a youth coach of the South African swimming team, where he was Junior Coach of the Year in 2005, he is currently head coach at Melbourne Vicentre, a Melbourne-based swimming club.
