= 2022 FINA World Swimming Championships (25 m) – Women's 200 metre individual medley =

Swimming competition

Women's 200 metre individual medley at the 2022 FINA World Swimming Championships (25 m)
- Venue: Melbourne Sports and Aquatic Centre
- Location: Melbourne, Australia
- Dates: 13 December (heats and final)
- Competitors: 34 from 28 nations
- Winning time: 2:02.12

Medalists
| gold medal | Kate Douglass | United States |
| silver medal | Alexandra Walsh | United States |
| bronze medal | Kaylee McKeown | Australia |

The Women's 200 metre individual medley competition of the 2022 FINA World Swimming Championships (25 m) was held on 13 December 2022.

== Records ==
Prior to the competition, the existing world and championship records were as follows.

| World record | Katinka Hosszú (HUN) | 2:01.86 | Doha, Qatar | 6 December 2014 |
| Competition record | Katinka Hosszú (HUN) | 2:01.86 | Doha, Qatar | 6 December 2014 |

== Results ==
=== Heats ===
The heats were started at 12:32.

| Rank | Heat | Lane | Name | Nationality | Time | Notes |
|---|---|---|---|---|---|---|
| 1 | 5 | 4 | Kate Douglass | United States | 2:04.39 | Q |
| 2 | 3 | 3 | Alexandra Walsh | United States | 2:05.94 | Q |
| 3 | 5 | 6 | Marrit Steenbergen | Netherlands | 2:06.01 | Q, NR |
| 4 | 3 | 5 | Kaylee McKeown | Australia | 2:06.07 | Q |
| 5 | 3 | 6 | Charlotte Bonnet | France | 2:06.70 | Q, NR |
| 6 | 4 | 4 | Sydney Pickrem | Canada | 2:07.15 | Q |
| 7 | 5 | 5 | Abbie Wood | Great Britain | 2:07.20 | Q |
| 8 | 4 | 6 | Sara Franceschi | Italy | 2:07.25 | Q |
| 9 | 4 | 5 | Mary-Sophie Harvey | Canada | 2:07.41 | |
| 10 | 2 | 5 | Rebecca Meder | South Africa | 2:07.47 | NR |
| 11 | 4 | 2 | Kim Seo-yeong | South Korea | 2:07.74 | |
| 12 | 5 | 7 | Kayla Hardy | Australia | 2:08.11 | |
| 13 | 3 | 4 | Yui Ohashi | Japan | 2:08.12 | |
| 14 | 3 | 7 | Lena Kreundl | Austria | 2:08.44 | |
| 15 | 5 | 1 | Ao Nakashima | Japan | 2:09.55 | |
| 16 | 5 | 3 | Zsuzsanna Jakabos | Hungary | 2:09.63 | |
| 17 | 4 | 3 | Costanza Cocconcelli | Italy | 2:09.71 | |
| 18 | 2 | 8 | Letitia Sim | Singapore | 2:09.82 | NR |
| 19 | 5 | 2 | Helena Gasson | New Zealand | 2:10.33 | |
| 20 | 3 | 2 | Kristýna Horská | Czech Republic | 2:10.46 | |
| 21 | 2 | 4 | Laura Lahtinen | Finland | 2:10.66 | |
| 22 | 4 | 1 | Emelie Fast | Sweden | 2:10.95 | |
| 23 | 3 | 1 | Cyrielle Duhamel | France | 2:11.20 | |
| 24 | 4 | 7 | Kristen Romano | Puerto Rico | 2:12.07 | |
| 25 | 5 | 8 | Stephanie Balduccini | Brazil | 2:12.46 | |
| 26 | 3 | 8 | McKenna DeBever | Peru | 2:12.85 | |
| 27 | 4 | 8 | Nikoleta Trníková | Slovakia | 2:13.00 | |
| 28 | 2 | 1 | Phiangkhwan Pawapotako | Thailand | 2:13.76 | |
| 29 | 2 | 2 | Chloe Isleta | Philippines | 2:13.77 | NR |
| 30 | 2 | 6 | Chen Szu-an | Chinese Taipei | 2:13.87 | |
| 31 | 2 | 7 | Maria Romanjuk | Estonia | 2:14.15 | |
| 32 | 1 | 4 | Yeung Hoi Ching | Hong Kong | 2:19.41 | |
| 33 | 1 | 5 | Chen Pui Lam | Macau | 2:23.61 | |
| 34 | 1 | 3 | Kirsten Fisher-Marsters | Cook Islands | 2:28.89 | |
| | 2 | 3 | Ge Chutong | China | Did not start | |

=== Final ===
The final was held at 20:11.

| Rank | Lane | Name | Nationality | Time | Notes |
|---|---|---|---|---|---|
| 1st place, gold medalist(s) | 4 | Kate Douglass | United States | 2:02.12 | AM |
| 2nd place, silver medalist(s) | 5 | Alexandra Walsh | United States | 2:03.37 | |
| 3rd place, bronze medalist(s) | 6 | Kaylee McKeown | Australia | 2:03.57 | OC |
| 4 | 3 | Marrit Steenbergen | Netherlands | 2:04.94 | NR |
| 5 | 7 | Sydney Pickrem | Canada | 2:05.22 | |
| 6 | 1 | Abbie Wood | Great Britain | 2:07.28 | |
| 7 | 2 | Charlotte Bonnet | France | 2:07.37 | |
| 8 | 8 | Sara Franceschi | Italy | 2:09.76 | |
