= Belinda Bennett =

Saint Helena cruise ship captain

Belinda Bennett MNM (born c.1977) is a cruise ship captain from Saint Helena. She is the first black woman to work as captain of a cruise ship.

== Life ==
Belinda Bennett was born and grew up on Saint Helena, a British Overseas Territory in the South Atlantic Ocean. When she was 17 she took a job as a deck cadet on the RMS St Helena. She left after nine years in 2003, by which time she had risen to be Second Officer. Bennett then worked on SS Delphine, a private charter yacht near Monaco, worked on ferries for the Isle of Man Steam Packet Company and returned to school to take a masters.

Told that it would be hard for her to find work in the yachting industry as an over-educated black woman, she started working for Windstar Cruises as a Second Officer in 2005. She continued rising in rank, being made Captain of the MSY Wind Star, and Windstar's first woman captain, in March 2016.

In 2018 Bennett was awarded the Merchant Navy Medal for Meritorious Service.
