= Commercial Swimming Club =

Australian swimming club

Coordinates: 27.4541°S 153.03675°E

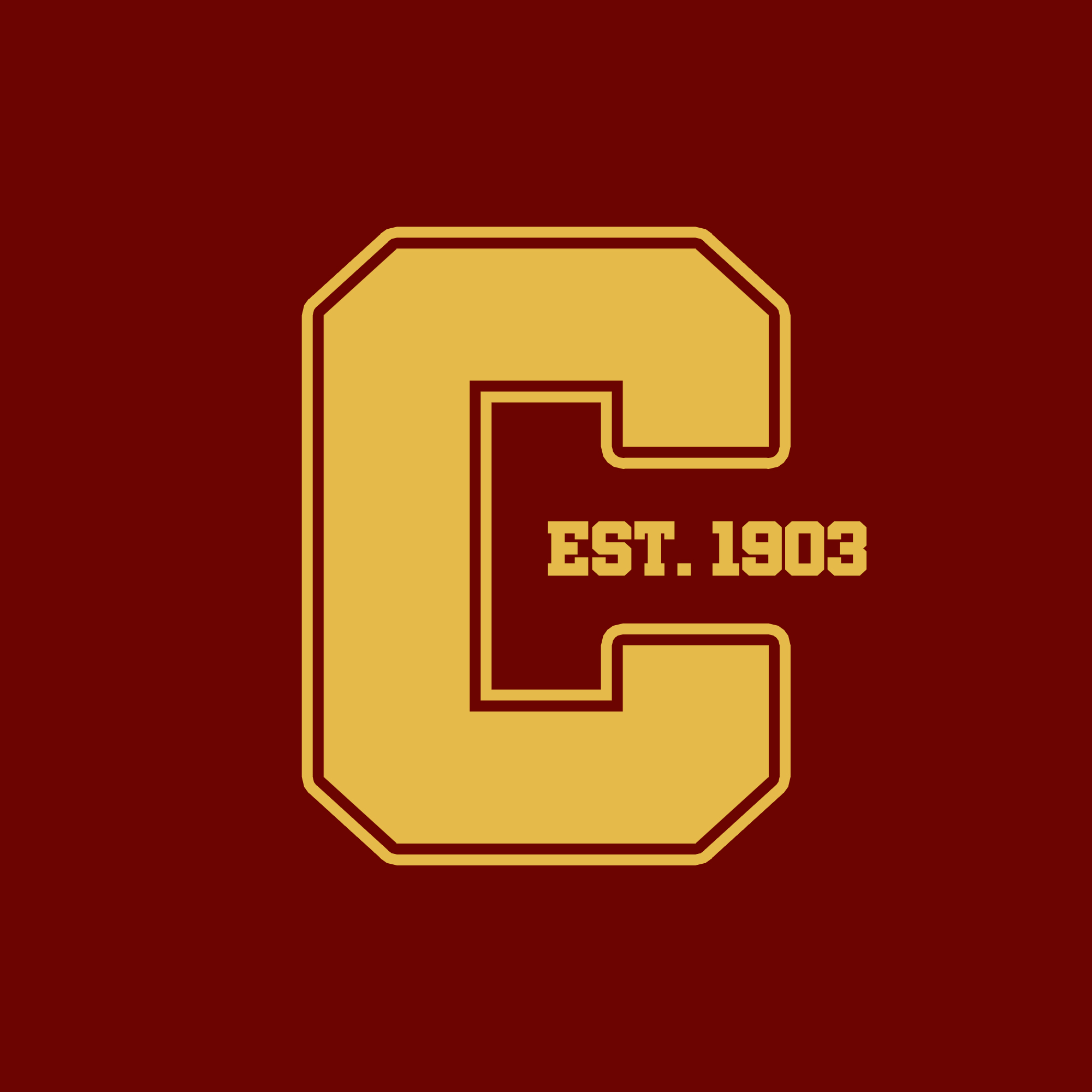

Club information
- Full name: Commercial Swimming Club
- Short name: Commercial
- City: Brisbane
- Founded: 1903
- Home pool: The Valley Pool
- Chairman: Peter Crane

Swimming
- Head coach: Sebastien Roy-Bryant

Masters swimming
- Name: Commercial Masters Squad
- Founded: 1991
- Head coach: Sebastien Roy-Bryant

Commercial Swimming Club is a swimming club that is based at the Fortitude Valley Pool in centre of Brisbane, Queensland. Club members have represented the country at the Olympic Games, FINA World Aquatics Championships and Commonwealth Games. Prominent club members have included Susie O'Neill, Cate and Bronte Campbell, Kieren Perkins and Libby Trickett.

== History ==
The Commercial Swimming Club is over 110 years old, commencing as a ladies' club, The Ladies Commercial Amateur Swimming Club, about November, 1903. A men's club, The Commercial Amateur Swimming Club, commenced in 1913. The two clubs amalgamated in 1974.

All of the original records and other photographs and documentation relating to the club's first 104 years in the possession of the Club, were handed to the John Oxley Library, part of the Queensland State Library, in Brisbane by Barry Short, in 2007, to prevent the loss of any of these records as did happen to much of the early records. Additional records relating to each season of the club are being forwarded to the John Oxley Library to continue the recording of the club's history, for the benefit of those writing a history of the club's second 100 years.

The beginning of the club in 1903 and after, shows a very different story to the modern swimming scene. The women' club conducted a three-mile race in the Bremer River, on 22 March 1913, won by Minnie King. About the same time, three mile races were regularly being held in the river for men. According to Jim Dunning, the men's club's original Secretary: "On the Saturday before the three mile swim, the Queensland Ladies' Amateur Swimming Association allowed men to be spectators at a ladies carnival for the first time in many years. It was the occasion of the interstate ladies Championship." Another women's three mile race was conducted by Commercial Ladies' in the following season in 1913.

The men's club's first world record holder, James William Thompson, won it swimming one mile backstroke. He is recorded of being a world record holder early in the men's club's life (from 1913) and a copy of a certificate shows he swam a further mile world record on 18 January 1918, swimming the distance in backstroke in 29 minutes and 4.2 seconds, at the City Bath on Wickham St in Fortitude Valley. At that time the baths, also known as the Booroodabin Baths, were covered and were 100 feet long.

== Notable athletes ==
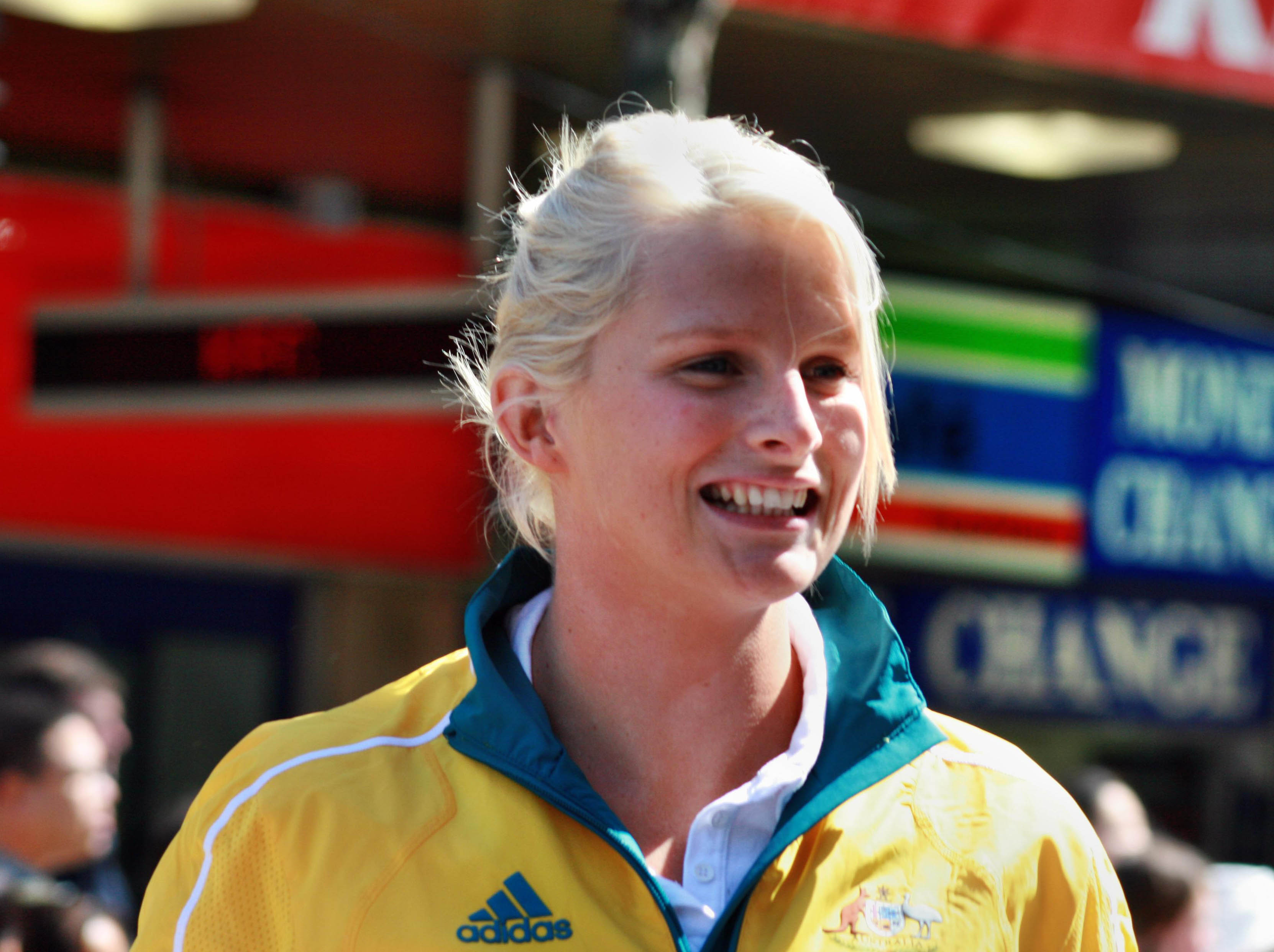
Leisel Jones

- Michael Bohl
- Cate Campbell (2013-2016)
- Bronte Campbell (2013-2011)
- Tommaso D'Orsogna (2014-2016)
- Jayden Hadler (2014-2016)
- Leisel Jones (2004-2007)
- Susie O'Neill
- Kieren Perkins
- Carolyn Reid
- Samantha Riley
- Angela Russell
- Jessicah Schipper (2008-)
- Melanie Schlanger
- Christian Sprenger (2013-2015)
- Libby Trickett (-2008)
- Angus Waddell
- Tarnee White
- Tracey Wickham
- Nancy Lyons

== See also ==
- List of swim clubs
