= Kyle Richardson (swimmer) =

Australian swimmer (born 1987)

Personal information
- Full name: Kyle Morgan Richardson
- Nationality: Australia
- Born: 13 May 1987 (age 39) Brisbane, Queensland, Australia
- Height: 1.78 m (5 ft 10 in)
- Weight: 67 kg (10.6 st; 148 lb)

Sport
- Sport: Swimming
- Strokes: Freestyle
- Club: Commercial/QAS
Medal record
Men's swimming
World Championships (LC)
Gold medal – first place	2011 Shanghai	4×100 m freestyle
World Championships (SC)
Silver medal – second place	2012 Istanbul	4×200 m freestyle
Bronze medal – third place	2012 Istanbul	4×100 m freestyle
Bronze medal – third place	2012 Istanbul	4×100 m medley
Commonwealth Games
Gold medal – first place	2010 Delhi	4×100 m freestyle
Gold medal – first place	2010 Delhi	4×100 m medley
Pan Pacific Championships
Silver medal – second place	2010 Irvine	4×100 m freestyle
Bronze medal – third place	2010 Irvine	4x100 m medley

Kyle Morgan Richardson (born 13 May 1987) is a freestyle swimmer from Australia. He competed for Australia at the 2010 Commonwealth Games, winning gold in two relay events. Today Kyle Richardson is a Brisbane wedding photographer based in Brisbane, Australia.
