= Daniel Tranter =

Australian swimmer (born 1992)

Personal information
- Full name: Daniel John Tranter
- Nickname: "Dan"
- National team: Australia
- Born: 11 January 1992 (age 34) Campbelltown, New South Wales
- Height: 1.92 m (6 ft 4 in)
- Weight: 83 kg (183 lb)

Sport
- Sport: Swimming
- Strokes: Individual medley, breaststroke, butterfly
- Club: Trinity Grammar
- Coach: Benjamin Tuxford

Daniel John Tranter (born 11 January 1992) is an Australian swimmer who has competed for the Australian Swim team at the 2012 Olympic Games in London, England, the 2013 World Championships in Barcelona, Spain, and the 2014 Commonwealth Games in Glasgow, Scotland. He won the Australian championship in the 200-metre individual medley from 2012 to 2016.

At the 2012 Olympics, he qualified for the semi-finals of the 200-metre individual medley, finishing in 13th place and placed 32nd in the heats of the 400-metre individual medley.

After deciding to cease competing in the 400-metre individual medley to focus his training on the 200-metre individual medley, he placed 6th in the final of the 200-metre individual medley (1.57.88) at the 2013 World Aquatics Championships in Barcelona, and finished the season with the 7th fastest time (1.57.55) in the world for the year.

At the 2014 Australian Swimming Championships, Tranter placed 1st in the 200-metre individual medley (1.57.66), 2nd in the 200-metre breaststroke (2.12.26), and 3rd in the 200-metre butterfly (1.57.48), and in doing so qualified to compete in all three events for the 2014 Commonwealth Games.

At the 2014 Commonwealth Games in Glasgow, Tranter won Gold in the 200-metre individual medley, winning in a new Commonwealth Games record time of 1.57.66. South African Chad le Clos, lead the field after the Butterfly and Backstroke legs, but Tranter surged to the lead in the breastroke leg and won the race.

Competing in the 200-metre butterfly, Tranter finished 6th in the final recording a personal best time of 1:57:31.

He attended Bradbury Public School and Westfields Sports High School.
