= Melbourne Vicentre =

Melbourne Vicentre Swimming Club
- Nicknames: Vicentre, MVC
- Sport: Swimming
- Founded: 1988
- League: Swimming Victoria
- Division: Metropolitan District South
- Based in: Albert Park
- Stadium: Melbourne Sports and Aquatic Centre
- Colours: Red and Blue
- Head coach: Craig Jackson (swimmer)
- Championships: 2004, 2005, 2006, 2007, 2008, 2011, 2012, 2013
- Website: http://vicentre.swimming.org.au/

Melbourne Vicentre is a swimming club based at the Melbourne Sports and Aquatic Centre (MSAC), Melbourne, Australia. Its head coach is 1992 Olympian Craig Jackson, supported by Kenrick Monk, Brad Harris and others. Prior to his resignation in 2017, Ian Pope was head coach of Vicentre for 16 years. Vicentre is one of the largest clubs in Victoria, and Swimming Australia Podium Performance Centre.

Amongst the swimmers who train currently with Vicentre are Olympians Mack Horton and Kotuku Ngawati, Paralympians Ahmed Kelly, Ashleigh McConnell and Tanya Huebner as well as Masters World Record holder Linley Frame. Past club members include Giaan Rooney, Matt Welsh, Grant Hackett, Michael Klim, Daniel Kowalski, Marieke Guehrer and Nicole Livingstone. Nicole Livingstone was CEO of the club between July 2014 and early 2017. Former Coaches include Gene Jackson, Bill Nelson and Adam Luscombe.

The club was formed in 1988 following the amalgamation of Melbourne Aquatic and ACI Vicentre swimming clubs.

Prior to being based at MSAC, the club operated at the State Swim Centre in Batman Avenue, from 1988 to 1997.

In 1996, the club amalgamated with Malvern Swimming Club Inc. The club is an incorporated association under the Associations Incorporation Act 1986 (Vic) and is an affiliate of Swimming Victoria and Metro South District.

== See also ==
- List of swim clubs
