= Daniel Arnamnart =

Australian swimmer

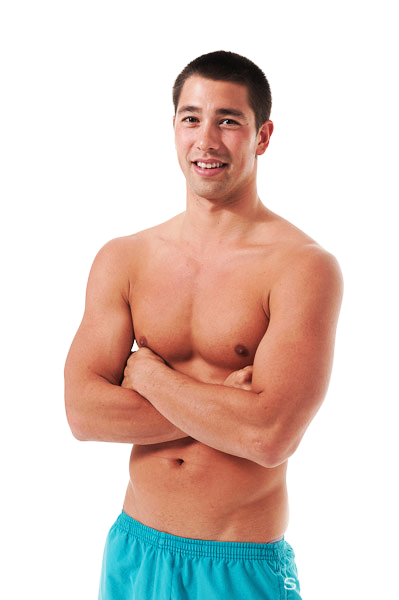

Personal information
- Nicknames: Arnie, Dan
- National team: Australia
- Born: 14 September 1989 (age 36) Wahroonga, New South Wales
- Height: 1.58 m (5 ft 2 in)
- Weight: 130 kg (287 lb)

Sport
- Sport: Swimming
- Strokes: Backstroke
- Club: Knox Pymble Swim Club
- Coach: Brant Best
Medal record
Men's swimming
Representing Australia
Universiade
Silver medal – second place	2013 Kazan	4×100 m freestyle

Daniel Arnamnart (born 14 September 1989) is an Australian competitive swimmer who specialises in backstroke events.

== Early years ==
Arnamnart was born in Wahroonga, New South Wales. He was educated at Asquith Boys High School.

Arnamnart completed at the 2006 Australian Short Course Swimming Championships reaching the finals of all three backstroke events. He finished 5th in 50 metres, 4th in the 200 metres and won the bronze medal in the 100 metre event finishing behind the winner in all three events Matt Welsh. On the back of these results he was named in the team of 30 to represent Australia at the second edition of the Junior Pan Pacific Swimming Championships held in Maui, Hawaii, in January 2007. At that event, he won the 100 metre backstroke in 54.99 seconds a new Under 17's Australian record. He also won two more gold medals when he teamed up Bobby Jovanovich, Robert Hurley and Reece Turner to take out the 4x100-metre freestyle relay and with James Stacey, Sam Ashby and Bobby Jovanovich to win the 4x100-metre medley relay. At the conclusion of the event, he was named the swimmer of the meet.

== Senior career ==
=== London Olympics ===
Daniel Arnamnart qualified for the 2012 Olympics by winning silver medal in the 100-metre backstroke at the Australian Swimming Championships in Adelaide with a time of 54.05. At the 2012 Summer Olympics in London, Arnamnart competed in the preliminary heats of the 100-metre backstroke, and finished with the 16th-best time overall, qualifying for the semifinals. In the semifinals, his time was not fast enough to qualify for the final.
