= Chris Wright (swimmer) =

Australian swimmer (born 1988)

Personal information
- Full name: Christopher Geoffrey Wright
- Nickname: "Chris"
- National team: Australia
- Born: 7 May 1988 (age 38) Cairns, Queensland
- Height: 1.86 m (6 ft 1 in)
- Weight: 89 kg (196 lb)

Sport
- Sport: Swimming
- Strokes: Butterfly, freestyle
- Club: Southport Olympic
- Coach: Glenn Baker

Christopher Geoffrey Wright (born 7 May 1988) is an Australian swimmer. He competed for Australia at the 2012 Summer Olympics in the 100 and 200 m butterfly. At the 2014 Commonwealth Games, he competed in the 50 and 100 m butterfly and the men's 4 × 100 m relay.

He is married to fellow Australian Olympic swimmer Melanie Schlanger.
