= Tommaso D'Orsogna =

Australian swimmer (born 1990)

Personal information
- Full name: Tommaso William D'Orsogna
- Nicknames: "Tommy", "Tomato"
- National team: Australia
- Born: 29 December 1990 (age 35) Perth, Western Australia
- Height: 1.90 m (6 ft 3 in)
- Weight: 84 kg (185 lb)

Sport
- Sport: Swimming
- Strokes: Freestyle
- Club: West Coast Swim Club, Commercial
- Coach: Simon Cusack
Medal record
Men's swimming
Representing Australia
Olympic Games
Bronze medal – third place	2012 London	4×100 m medley
World Championships (LC)
Silver medal – second place	2013 Barcelona	4×100 m medley
Bronze medal – third place	2009 Rome	4×200 m freestyle
World Championships (SC)
Silver medal – second place	2012 Istanbul	100 m freestyle
Silver medal – second place	2012 Istanbul	4×200 m freestyle
Silver medal – second place	2016 Windsor	4x100 m medley
Bronze medal – third place	2012 Istanbul	4×100 m freestyle
Bronze medal – third place	2012 Istanbul	4×100 m medley
Bronze medal – third place	2014 Doha	100 m butterfly
Bronze medal – third place	2016 Windsor	100 m freestyle
Bronze medal – third place	2016 Windsor	4x100 m freestyle
Pan Pacific Championships
Gold medal – first place	2014 Gold Coast	4×100 m freestyle
Bronze medal – third place	2014 Gold Coast	4×100 m medley
Commonwealth Games
Gold medal – first place	2010 Delhi	4×100 m freestyle
Gold medal – first place	2014 Glasgow	4×100 m freestyle
Bronze medal – third place	2014 Glasgow	100 m freestyle

Tommaso William D'Orsogna (born 29 December 1990) is an Australian freestyle swimmer. He won a bronze medal at the 2012 Summer Olympics in the men's 4×100-metre medley relay. He also won gold in that event at the 2014 Commonwealth Games, in a Games record time. Individually, at those Commonwealth Games, he won the bronze medal in the 100 m freestyle.

== Career best times ==
- Long course (50m pool)
  - 200m IM – 2:00.31 – 2009 World Championships
  - 100m freestyle – 48.41 – 2009 AIS Meet
  - 200m freestyle – 1:47.76 – 2013 Australian Championships
- short course (25m pool)
  - 200m IM – 1:55.41 – 2010 World Short Course Championship
  - 100m freestyle – 46.13 – 2014 World Short Course Championship
  - 200m freestyle – 1:42.26 – 2009 Telstra Australian Short Course

== See also ==
- List of Commonwealth Games medallists in swimming (men)
- List of Olympic medalists in swimming (men)
