= Jayden Hadler =

Australian swimmer

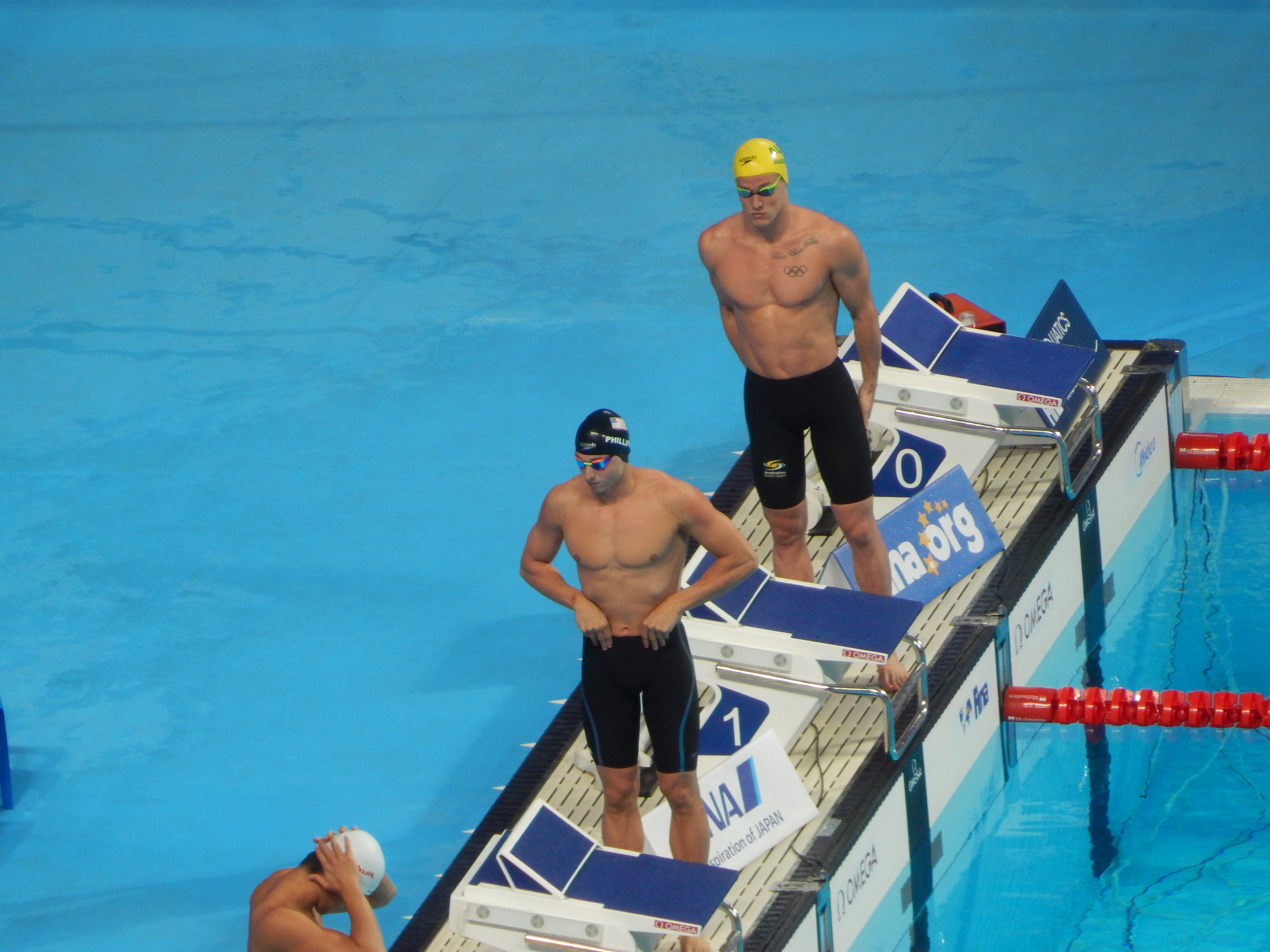
- Phillips (black cap) and Hadler (yellow cap) in Kazan 2015

Personal information
- Full name: Jayden Robert Hadler
- Nicknames: JJ, Big J, Jacob's coach and Big Dog
- National team: Australia
- Born: 23 September 1993 (age 32) Joondalup, Western Australia
- Height: 1.83 m (6 ft 0 in)
- Weight: 96 kg (212 lb)

Sport
- Sport: Swimming
- Strokes: Butterfly, freestyle, medley
- Club: Southern Cross Swimming Club
- Coach: Jayden Hadler
Medal record
Men's swimming
Representing Australia
World Championships (LC)
Silver medal – second place	2015 Kazan	4×100 m medley
Commonwealth Games
Gold medal – first place	2014 Glasgow	4×100 m freestyle
Silver medal – second place	2014 Glasgow	4×100 m medley
Universiade
Silver medal – second place	2013 Kazan	4×100 m freestyle

Jayden Hadler (born 23 September 1993) is an Australian competitive swimmer. He represented Australia at the 2012 Summer Olympics in London, competing in the preliminary heats of the men's 100-metre butterfly and 200-metre individual medley swimming. In the 200 Individual medley, he was beating Michael Phelps aka the best Olympian of all time at the 50 mark, he also would have made the semifinal and been .11 of the final had he swam the time he swam at the 2012 trials.He now owns his own swimming club called "Southern Cross Swim Club".
