= 2014 Pan Pacific Swimming Championships – Men's 200 metre individual medley =

Men's 200 metre individual medley at the 2014 Pan Pacific Swimming Championships
- Venue: Gold Coast Aquatic Centre
- Dates: August 24, 2014 (heats & finals)
- Competitors: 21
- Winning time: 1:56.02

Medalists
gold medal	Kosuke Hagino	Japan
silver medal	Michael Phelps	United States
bronze medal	Daiya Seto	Japan

The men's 200 metre individual medley competition at the 2014 Pan Pacific Swimming Championships took place on August 24 at the Gold Coast Aquatic Centre. The last champion was Ryan Lochte of US.

This race consisted of four lengths of the pool, one each in backstroke, breaststroke, butterfly and freestyle swimming.

== Records ==
Prior to this competition, the existing world and Pan Pacific records were as follows:

World record	Ryan Lochte (USA)	1:54.00	Shanghai, China	July 28, 2011
Pan Pacific Championships record	Ryan Lochte (USA)	1:54.43	Irvine, United States	August 21, 2010

== Results ==
All times are in minutes and seconds.

KEY:	q	Fastest non-qualifiers	Q	Qualified	CR	Championships record	NR	National record	PB	Personal best	SB	Seasonal best

=== Heats ===
The first round was held on August 24, at 10:42.

Rank	Name	Nationality	Time	Notes
1	Kosuke Hagino	Japan	1:57.61	QA
2	Daiya Seto	Japan	1:58.02	QA
3	Tyler Clary	United States	1:58.70	QA
4	Michael Phelps	United States	1:58.95	QA
5	Ryan Lochte	United States	1:59.09	QA
6	Hiromasa Fujimori	Japan	1:59.41	QA
7	Ryosuke Irie	Japan	1:59.95	QA
8	Thiago Pereira	Brazil	2:00.44	QA
9	Takeharu Fujimori	Japan	2:01.01	QB
10	Chase Kalisz	United States	2:01.03	QB
11	Conor Dwyer	United States	2:01.16	QB
12	Mitchell Donaldson	New Zealand	2:01.45	QB
13	Travis Mahoney	Australia	2:01.50	QB
14	Michael Meyer	South Africa	2:01.80	QB
15	Reo Sakata	Japan	2:03.00	QB
16	Yuki Kobori	Japan	2:03.71	QB
17	Luke Reilly	Canada	2:04.32	
18	Gamal Assaad	Canada	2:06.61	
19	Raymond Mak	Hong Kong	2:08.81	
20	Chun Nam Ng	Hong Kong	2:13.43	
21	Kinve Nicholls	Fiji	2:33.64	

=== B Final ===
The B final was held on August 24, at 20:24.

Rank	Name	Nationality	Time	Notes
9	Ryan Lochte	United States	1:56.02	
10	Takeharu Fujimori	Japan	2:01.05	
11	Hiromasa Fujimori	Japan	2:01.38	
12	Luke Reilly	Canada	2:05.23	
13	Gamal Assaad	Canada	2:07.13	
14	Raymond Mak	Hong Kong	2:07.92	
15	Chun Nam Ng	Hong Kong	2:12.61	

=== A Final ===
The A final was held on August 24, at 20:24.

Rank	Name	Nationality	Time	Notes
1st place, gold medalist(s)	Kosuke Hagino	Japan	1:56.02	
2nd place, silver medalist(s)	Michael Phelps	United States	1:56.04	
3rd place, bronze medalist(s)	Daiya Seto	Japan	1:57.72	
4	Thiago Pereira	Brazil	1:57.83	
5	Tyler Clary	United States	1:58.79	
6	Travis Mahoney	Australia	1:59.79	
7	Mitchell Donaldson	New Zealand	2:01.34	
8	Michael Meyer	South Africa	2:01.78	
