= 2014 Pan Pacific Swimming Championships – Men's 400 metre individual medley =

Men's 400 metre individual medley at the 2014 Pan Pacific Swimming Championships
- Venue: Gold Coast Aquatic Centre
- Dates: August 22, 2014 (heats & finals)
- Competitors: 16
- Winning time: 4:08.31

Medalists
gold medal	Kosuke Hagino	Japan
silver medal	Tyler Clary	United States
bronze medal	Chase Kalisz	United States

The men's 200 metre individual medley competition at the 2014 Pan Pacific Swimming Championships took place on August 22 at the Gold Coast Aquatic Centre. The last champion was Ryan Lochte of US.

This race consisted of eight lengths of the pool. The first two lengths were swum using the butterfly stroke, the second pair with the backstroke, the third pair of lengths in breaststroke, and the final two were freestyle.

== Records ==
Prior to this competition, the existing world and Pan Pacific records were as follows:

World record	Michael Phelps (USA)	4:03.84	Beijing, China	August 10, 2008
Pan Pacific Championships record	Ryan Lochte (USA)	4:07.59	Irvine, United States	August 19, 2010

== Results ==
All times are in minutes and seconds.

KEY:	q	Fastest non-qualifiers	Q	Qualified	CR	Championships record	NR	National record	PB	Personal best	SB	Seasonal best

=== Heats ===
The first round was held on August 22, at 11:36.

Rank	Name	Nationality	Time	Notes
1	Kosuke Hagino	Japan	4:11.48	QA
2	Daiya Seto	Japan	4:11.74	QA
3	Chase Kalisz	United States	4:13.12	QA
4	Tyler Clary	United States	4:13.88	QA
5	Takeharu Fujimori	Japan	4:13.95	QA
6	Hiromasa Fujimori	Japan	4:14.00	QA
7	Michael Weiss	United States	4:16.60	QA
8	Josh Prenot	United States	4:16.62	QA
9	Thomas Fraser-Holmes	Australia	4:18.41	QB
10	Michael Meyer	South Africa	4:18.89	QB
11	Travis Mahoney	Australia	4:19.12	QB
12	Luke Reilly	Canada	4:21.39	QB
13	Mack Darragh	Canada	4:22.36	QB
14	Thiago Simon	Brazil	4:25.68	QB
15	Will Brothers	Canada	4:26.55	QB
16	Wei Haobo	China	4:29.11	QB

=== B Final ===
The B final was held on August 22, at 20:45.

Rank	Name	Nationality	Time	Notes
9	Takeharu Fujimori	Japan	4:14.12	
10	Michael Weiss	United States	4:14.85	
11	Hiromasa Fujimori	Japan	4:19.33	
12	Mack Darragh	Canada	4:22.54	
13	Wei Haobo	China	4:27.07	
14	Will Brothers	Canada	4:28.77	

=== A Final ===
The A final was held on August 22, at 20:45.

Rank	Name	Nationality	Time	Notes
1st place, gold medalist(s)	Kosuke Hagino	Japan	4:08.31	
2nd place, silver medalist(s)	Tyler Clary	United States	4:09.03	
3rd place, bronze medalist(s)	Chase Kalisz	United States	4:09.62	
4	Thomas Fraser-Holmes	Australia	4:10.55	
5	Daiya Seto	Japan	4:12.77	
6	Michael Meyer	South Africa	4:17.62	
7	Travis Mahoney	Australia	4:17.95	
8	Luke Reilly	Canada	4:21.96	
