= 2014 Pan Pacific Swimming Championships – Men's 200 metre backstroke =

Men's 200 metre backstroke at the 2014 Pan Pacific Swimming Championships
- Venue: Gold Coast Aquatic Centre
- Dates: August 23, 2014 (heats & finals)
- Competitors: 21
- Winning time: 1:54.91

Medalists
gold medal	Tyler Clary	United States
silver medal	Ryosuke Irie	Japan
bronze medal	Mitchell Larkin	Australia

The men's 200 metre backstroke competition at the 2014 Pan Pacific Swimming Championships took place on August 23 at the Gold Coast Aquatic Centre. The last champion was Ryan Lochte of US.

This race consisted of four lengths of the pool, all in backstroke.

== Records ==
Prior to this competition, the existing world and Pan Pacific records were as follows:

World record	Aaron Peirsol (USA)	1:51.92	Rome, Italy	July 31, 2009
Pan Pacific Championships record	Ryan Lochte (USA)	1:54.12	Irvine, United States	August 20, 2010

== Results ==
All times are in minutes and seconds.

KEY:	q	Fastest non-qualifiers	Q	Qualified	CR	Championships record	NR	National record	PB	Personal best	SB	Seasonal best

=== Heats ===
The first round was held on August 23, at 11:37.

Rank	Name	Nationality	Time	Notes
1	Ryosuke Irie	Japan	1:55.10	QA
2	Ryan Murphy	United States	1:55.73	QA
3	Tyler Clary	United States	1:56.45	QA
4	Mitchell Larkin	Australia	1:56.86	QA
5	Kosuke Hagino	Japan	1:56.94	QA
6	Josh Beaver	Australia	1:57.52	QA
7	Haya Matsubara	Japan	1:58.27	QA
8	Jacob Pebley	United States	1:58.46	QA
9	Leonardo de Deus	Brazil	1:59.60	QB
10	Corey Main	New Zealand	1:59.85	QB
11	Fabio Santi	Brazil	2:00.58	QB
12	Matson Lawson	Australia	2:00.60	QB
13	Russell Wood	Canada	2:01.43	QB
14	Travis Mahoney	Australia	2:01.99	QB
15	Richard Ellis	South Africa	2:02.40	QB
16	Michael Meyer	South Africa	2:02.89	QB
17	Joe Byram	Canada	2:05.48	

=== B Final ===
The B final was held on August 23, at 20:52.

Rank	Name	Nationality	Time	Notes
9	Haya Matsubara	Japan	1:57.94	
10	Fabio Santi	Brazil	2:00.17	
11	Matson Lawson	Australia	2:00.49	
12	Russell Wood	Canada	2:00.76	
13	Richard Ellis	South Africa	2:02.93	
14	Joe Byram	Canada	2:03.57	
15	Michael Meyer	South Africa	2:03.77	

=== A Final ===
The A final was held on August 23, at 20:52.

Rank	Name	Nationality	Time	Notes
1st place, gold medalist(s)	Tyler Clary	United States	1:54.91	
2nd place, silver medalist(s)	Ryosuke Irie	Japan	1:55.14	
3rd place, bronze medalist(s)	Mitchell Larkin	Australia	1:55.27	
4	Ryan Murphy	United States	1:56.17	
5	Josh Beaver	Australia	1:57.70	
6	Leonardo de Deus	Brazil	1:57.78	
7	Corey Main	New Zealand	1:59.63	
8	Kosuke Hagino	Japan	1:59.86	
