= 2013 Australian Swimming Championships =

Swimming competition

- Host city: Adelaide, South Australia
- Date: 26 April – 3 May
- Venue: South Australia Aquatic and Leisure Centre
- Events: 40 (men: 20; women: 20)

The 2013 Australian Swimming Championships were held from 26 April until 3 May 2013 at the South Australia Aquatic and Leisure Centre in Adelaide, South Australia. They doubled up as the national trials for the 2013 World Aquatics Championships.

== Qualification criteria ==
Below were the entry qualifying times for each event that had to be achieved after 1 January 2012 in a 50m pool.

Event	Men	Women
50m freestyle	24.30	27.40
100m freestyle	53.10	59.00
200m freestyle	1:57.00	2:07.50
400m freestyle	4:07.50	4:27.00
800m freestyle	8:37.00	9:02.00
1500m freestyle	16:12.00	17:45.00
50m backstroke	29.00	32.00
100m backstroke	1:01.40	1:08.00
200m backstroke	2:13.00	2:25.00
50m breaststroke	32.10	36.00
100m breaststroke	1:09.80	1:17.80
200m breaststroke	2:31.80	2:46.00
50m butterfly	26.10	30.00
100m butterfly	58.50	1:05.40
200m butterfly	2:09.00	2:23.50
200m IM	2:14.00	2:27.00
400m IM	4:43.00	5:05.00
4 × 100 m freestyle relay	3:37.00	4:09.00
4 × 200 m freestyle relay	8:00.00	8:45.00
4 × 100 m medley relay	4:05.00	4:35.00

Below were the FINA A and B qualifying times for the 2013 World Aquatics Championships for each event.

Event	Men		Women	
Event	A	B	A	B
50m freestyle	22.33	23.11	25.34	26.29
100m freestyle	48.93	50.64	54.86	56.78
200m freestyle	1:48.42	1:52.21	1:58.74	2:02.90
400m freestyle	3:49.55	3:57.58	4:09.81	4:18.55
800m freestyle	7:59.06	8:15.83	8:34.33	8:52.33
1500m freestyle	15:14.38	15:46.38	16:26.36	17:00.88
50m backstroke	25.43	26.32	28.84	29.85
100m backstroke	54.43	56.34	1:01.39	1:03.54
200m backstroke	1:58.48	2:02.63	2:11.09	2:15.68
50m breaststroke	28.00	28.98	32.00	33.12
100m breaststroke	1:00.86	1:02.99	1:08.63	1:11.03
200m breaststroke	2:12.78	2:17.43	2:27.88	2:33.06
50m butterfly	23.96	24.80	26.83	27.77
100m butterfly	52.57	54.41	58.89	1:00.95
200m butterfly	1:57.03	2:01.13	2:09.38	2:13.91
200m IM	1:59.99	2:04.19	2:14.97	2:19.69
400m IM	4:18.99	4:28.05	4:44.53	4:54.49

== Medal winners ==
=== Men's events ===
Event	Gold		Silver		Bronze	
50 m freestyle	James Magnussen; SOPAC (NSW)	21.52	Matthew Abood; Sydney University (NSW)	21.95	Matt Targett; Nunawading (Vic)	21.96
100 m freestyle	James Magnussen; SOPAC (NSW)	47.53	Cameron McEvoy; Palm Beach Currumbin (Qld)	48.07	James Roberts; Somerset (Qld)	48.37
200 m freestyle	Thomas Fraser-Holmes; Miami (Qld)	1:45.79	Cameron McEvoy; Palm Beach Currumbin (Qld)	1:46.03	David McKeon; Wests Illawarra (NSW)	1:46.96
400 m freestyle	David McKeon; Wests Illawarra (NSW)	3:43.71	Jordan Harrison; Miami (Qld)	3:45.85	Ryan Napoleon; St Peters Western (Qld)	3:46.26
800 m freestyle	Jarrod Poort; Wests Illawarra (NSW)	8:06.71	Jack McLoughlin; Nudgee Brothers (Qld)	8:12.53	Ethan Owens; Clovercrest (SA)	8:14.66
1500 m freestyle	Jordan Harrison; Miami (Qld)	14:51.02	Mack Horton; Melbourne Vicentre (Vic)	14:59.66	Ryan Napoleon; St Peters Western (Qld)	15:24.25
50 m backstroke	Daniel Arnamnart; SOPAC (NSW)	24.90	Benjamin Treffers; Burley Griffin (ACT)	24.97	Ashley Delaney; Nunawading (Vic)	25.35
100 m backstroke	Ashley Delaney; Nunawading (Vic)	53.63	Benjamin Treffers; Burley Griffin (ACT)	54.15	Daniel Arnamnart; SOPAC (NSW)	54.61
200 m backstroke	Matson Lawson; Tigersharks (Vic)	1:56.59	Mitch Larkin; St Peters Western (Qld)	1:56.79	Ashley Delaney; Nunawading (Vic)	1:57.58
50 m breaststroke	Christian Sprenger; Indooroopilly (Qld)	26.90; OR	Max Ireland; Nunawading (Vic)	27.90	Joshua Palmer; STARplex (SA)	28.11
100 m breaststroke	Christian Sprenger; Indooroopilly (Qld)	59.31	Brenton Rickard; Southport Olympic (Qld)	1:00.00	Kenneth To; Trinity Grammar (NSW)	1:01.85
200 m breaststroke	Buster Sykes; Nudgee Brothers (Qld)	2:13.25	Jeremy Meyer; Traralgon (Vic)	2:13.78	Nicholas Schafer; River City Rapids (Qld)	2:14.45
50 m butterfly	Matt Targett; Nunawading (Vic)	23.20	Mitch Patterson; Cranbrook Eastern Edge (NSW)	23.58	Chris Wright; Southport Olympic (Qld)	23.72
100 m butterfly	Chris Wright; Southport Olympic (Qld)	52.11	Daniel Lester; Lawnton (Qld)	52.14	Tommaso D'Orsogna; West Coast (WA)	52.26
200 m butterfly	Grant Irvine; St Peters Western (Qld)	1:55.32	Chris Wright; Southport Olympic (Qld)	1:57.79	Keiran Qaium; Sydney University (NSW)	1:58.10
200 m IM	Daniel Tranter; SOPAC (NSW)	1:57.55	Kenneth To; Trinity Grammar (NSW)	1:58.72	Justin James; Mackay (Qld)	1:59.80
400 m IM	Thomas Fraser-Holmes; Miami (Qld)	4:10.14; CR	Travis Mahoney; Nunawading (Vic)	4:18.09	Jared Gilliland; Nudgee Brothers (Qld)	4:19.31
4 × 100 m freestyle relay	Nunawading A (Vic); Travis Mahoney (50.57); Ashley Delaney (49.46); Dylan Warren (51.48); Shane Asbury (49.77)	3:21.28	Sydney University A (NSW); Andrew Abood (50.75); Te Haumi Maxwell (50.30); Matthew Abood (49.73); Sam McConnell (51.25)	3:22.03	Melbourne Vicentre A (Vic); Kayne Johns (51.53); Cody Smith (51.21); Jack Gerrard (50.12); Mack Horton (51.62)	3:24.48
4 × 200 m freestyle relay	Nunawading A (Vic); Shane Asbury (1:50.45); Dylan Warren (1:50.56); Ashley Delaney (1:53.15); Travis Mahoney (1:53.89)	7:28.05	Melbourne Vicentre A (Vic); Jack Gerrard (1:51.45); Mitchell Davenport-Wright (1:53.57); Zac Charlton (1:53.77); Andrew Cameron (1:53.84)	7:32.63	Redcliffe Leagues A (Qld); Matthew Briggs (1:53.67); Dushan Maric (1:53.72); Reece Brennan (1:55.21); Chripher Robinson (2:00.00)	7:42.60
4 × 100 m medley relay	Nunawading A (Vic); Ashley Delaney (54.33); Max Ireland (1:02.01); Matt Targett (52.49); Travis Mahoney (49.31)	3:38.14	Trinity Grammar A (NSW); Bobby Hurley (54.74); Tomas Elliott (1:04.16); Nathaniel Romeo (53.07); Kenneth To (48.04)	3:40.01	St Peters Western A (Qld); Mitch Larkin (55.74); Liam Rayfield (1:06.07); Grant Irvine (52.41); Ned McKendry (49.82)	3:44.04

Legend: WR – World record; CR – Commonwealth record; OR – Oceanian record; AR – Australian record; ACR – Australian All Comers record; Club – Australian Club record

=== Women's events ===
Event	Gold		Silver		Bronze	
50 m freestyle	Cate Campbell; Indooroopilly (Qld)	24.27	Bronte Campbell; Indooroopilly (Qld)	24.59	Brittany Elmslie; Nudgee Brothers (Qld)	24.91
100 m freestyle	Cate Campbell; Indooroopilly (Qld)	52.92	Bronte Campbell; Indooroopilly (Qld)	53.85	Alicia Coutts; Redlands (Qld)	54.09
200 m freestyle	Bronte Barratt; St Peters Western (Qld)	1:56.05	Kylie Palmer; Chandler (Qld)	1:56.66	Emma McKeon; Wests Illawarra (NSW)	1:56.77
400 m freestyle	Bronte Barratt; St Peters Western (Qld)	4:03.52	Kylie Palmer; Chandler (Qld)	4:06.00	Katie Goldman; St Peters Western (Qld)	4:07.39
800 m freestyle	Jessica Ashwood; SOPAC (NSW)	8:24.63	Alanna Bowles; Rocky City (Qld)	8:30.12	Katie Goldman; St Peters Western (Qld)	8:31.06
1500 m freestyle	Chelsea Gubecka; Mountain Creek (Qld)	16:22.35	Leah Cutting; Marion (SA)	16:51.51	Bonnie Macdonald; TSS Aquatic (Qld)	16:56.97
50 m backstroke	Emily Seebohm; Nudgee Brothers (Qld)	28.18	Alicia Coutts; Redlands (Qld)	28.34	Madison Wilson; St Peters Western (Qld)	28.64
100 m backstroke	Emily Seebohm; Nudgee Brothers (Qld)	59.17; ACR	Belinda Hocking; Nunawading (Vic)	59.63	Meagen Nay; St Peters Western (Qld)	1:00.78
200 m backstroke	Belinda Hocking; Nunawading (Vic)	2:07.17	Meagen Nay; St Peters Western (Qld)	2:07.96	Emily Seebohm; Nudgee Brothers (Qld)	2:10.26
50 m breaststroke	Jennie Johansson; Sweden	30.83	Leiston Pickett; Southport Olympic (Qld)	30.86	Alicia Coutts; Redlands (Qld)	31.47
100 m breaststroke	Sally Foster; Marion (SA)	1:07.46	Samantha Marshall; Melbourne Vicentre	1:07.49	Leiston Pickett; Southport Olympic (Qld)	1:07.70
200 m breaststroke	Sally Foster; Marion (SA)	2:23.94	Jenna Strauch; Melbourne Vicentre (Vic)	2:26.47	Taylor McKeown; Australian Crawl (Qld)	2:28.24
50 m butterfly	Alicia Coutts; Redlands (Qld)	25.78	Marieke D'Cruz; Melbourne Vicentre (Vic)	26.18	Brianna Throssell; City of Perth (WA)	26.64
100 m butterfly	Alicia Coutts; Redlands (Qld)	57.18	Brittany Elmslie; Nudgee Brothers (Qld)	58.02	Ellen Gandy; Nunawading (Vic)	58.15
200 m butterfly	Madeline Groves; St Peters Western (Qld)	2:09.39	Samantha Hamill; Kawana Waters (Qld)	2:10.35	Nicole Mee; Cranbrook Eastern Edge (NSW)	2:10.71
200 m IM	Alicia Coutts; Redlands (Qld)	2:08.63; ACR	Emily Seebohm; Nudgee Brothers (Qld)	2:11.11	Taylor McKeown; Australian Crawl (Qld)	2:13.55
400 m IM	Keryn McMaster; Logan Vikings (Qld)	4:40.76	Samantha Hamill; Kawana Waters (Qld)	4:42.79	Taylor McKeown; Australian Crawl (Qld)	4:42.83
4 × 100 m freestyle relay	Nunawading (Vic); Belinda Parslow (57.61); Shani Burleigh (56.58); Stephanie Moore (57.07); Ellen Gandy (55.45)	3:46.71	Marion A (SA); Emma Duncan (57.60); Sumin Song (V) (57.21); Amelia Dahlitz (58.53); Sally Foster (55.43)	3:48.77	Carlile A (NSW); Leanne Wright (56.47); Jessie Quinn (59.01); Emily Washer (58.88); Ami Matsuo (54.53)	3:48.89
4 × 200 m freestyle relay	Marion A (SA); Sumin Song (V) (2:01.22); Leah Cutting (2:06.35); Kate Hofmeyer (2:04.94); Emma Duncan (2:03.57)	8:16.08	Rocky City (Qld); Miranda Bell (2:04.65); Alanna Bowles (2:02.01); Kate Hudson (2:06.67); Karleigh Banks (2:04.52)	8:17.85	Nunawading A (Vic); Belinda Parslow (2:00.60); Eliza Ham (2:04.33); Alanis Olesch-Byrne (2:09.74); Evelyn Boldt (2:07.94)	8:22.61
4 × 100 m medley relay	Nunawading A (Vic); Belinda Hocking (1:00.53); Sarah Lynch (1:08.08); Ellen Gandy (58.00); Belinda Parslow (55.59)	4:02.20; Club	St Peters Western A (Qld); Madison Wilson (1:01.05); Georgia Bohl (1:10.18); Madeline Groves (59.84); Bronte Barratt (54.45)	4:05.52	Melbourne Vicentre A (Vic); Hayley Baker (1:01.31); Samantha Marshall (1:07.24); Celeste Astorino (1:03.76); Kotuku Ngawati (55.09)	4:07.40

Legend: WR – World record; CR – Commonwealth record; OR – Oceanian record; AR – Australian record; ACR – Australian All Comers record; Club – Australian Club record
