= 2011 Australian Swimming Championships =

The 2011 Australian Swimming Championships were held from 1 April until 8 April 2011 at the Sydney International Aquatic Centre in Sydney, New South Wales. They doubled up as the national trials for the 2011 World Aquatics Championships.

== Qualification criteria ==
Event	Men	Women
50m freestyle	22.04	24.96
100m freestyle	48.76	54.44
200m freestyle	1:47.43	1:57.87
400m freestyle	3:48.50	4:07.81
800m freestyle	7:54.20	8:26.96
1500m freestyle	15:08.54	16:21.57
100m backstroke	54.23	1:00.44
200m backstroke	1:57.85	2:09.52
100m breaststroke	1:00.50	1:07.85
200m breaststroke	2:11.44	2:24.57
100m butterfly	52.25	58.47
200m butterfly	1:56.23	2:08.12
200m IM	1:59.67	2:12.12
400m IM	4:15.10	4:39.76
4×100m freestyle	3:15.07	3:38.81
4×200m freestyle	7:11.00	7:55.29
4×100m medley	3:33.99	4:01.18

== Medallists ==
=== Men's events ===
Event	Gold		Silver		Bronze	
50 m freestyle	Matthew Abood	22.02	Matt Targett	22.15	Ashley Callus	22.35
100 m freestyle	James Magnussen	48.29	James Roberts	48.72	Eamon Sullivan	48.89
200 m freestyle	Thomas Fraser-Holmes	1:47.19	Kenrick Monk	1:47.53	Ryan Napoleon	1:47.68
400 m freestyle	Ryan Napoleon	3:45.16	Thomas Fraser-Holmes	3:46.54	Robert Hurley	3:49.66
800 m freestyle	Ryan Napoleon	7:55.20	Robert Hurley	8:00.94	Matthew Levings	8:02.74
1500 m freestyle	Jarrod Killey	15:18.85	Wally Eggleton	15:19.13	Trent Grimsey	15:23.55
50 m backstroke	Ashley Delaney	25.52	Hayden Stoeckel	25.54	Daniel Arnamnart	25.97
100 m backstroke	Benjamin Treffers	53.72	Hayden Stoeckel	53.87	Ashley Delaney	54.17
200 m backstroke	Ashley Delaney	1:58.50	Mitch Larkin	1:59.09	Braiden Camm	2:00.42
50 m breaststroke	Brenton Rickard	27.60	Christian Sprenger	28.02	James Stacey	28.53
100 m breaststroke	Brenton Rickard	1:00.12	Christian Sprenger	1:00.37	James Stacey	1:02.43
200 m breaststroke	Brenton Rickard	2:11.84	Craig Calder	2:13.12	Craig Tucker	2:13.84
50 m butterfly	Matt Targett	23.27	Geoff Huegill	23.48	Joseph Carty	23.95
100 m butterfly	Geoff Huegill	52.36	Sam Ashby	52.48	Joseph Carty	52.91
200 m butterfly	Jayden Hadler	1:56.28	Travis Nederpelt	1:56.31	Lachlan Staples	1:58.98
200 m IM	Mitch Larkin	1:59.42	Kenneth To	2:00.05	Leith Brodie	2:00.15
400 m IM	Thomas Fraser-Holmes	4:16.75	Mitch Larkin	4:17.52	Daniel Tranter; Travis Mahoney	4:21.22

=== Women's events ===
Event	Gold		Silver		Bronze	
50 m freestyle	Olivia Halicek	24.88	Yolane Kukla	24.92	Sophie Edington	25.05
100 m freestyle	Alicia Coutts	53.80	Yolane Kukla	54.59	Bronte Barratt	54.67
200 m freestyle	Kylie Palmer	1:55.73	Bronte Barratt	1:55.74	Jade Neilsen	1:57.20
400 m freestyle	Kylie Palmer	4:04.29	Bronte Barratt	4:04.36	Katie Goldman	4:06.39
800 m freestyle	Katie Goldman	8:28.49	Melissa Gorman	8:30.85	Blair Evans	8:33.71
1500 m freestyle	Melissa Gorman	16:06.98	Jessica Ashwood	16:14.47	Bonnie Macdonald	16:16.58
50 m backstroke	Grace Loh	28.15	Sophie Edington	28.20	Belinda Hocking	28.33
100 m backstroke	Belinda Hocking	59.55	Emily Seebohm	1:00.08	Meagen Nay	1:00.51
200 m backstroke	Belinda Hocking	2:06.88	Meagen Nay	2:08.08	Mikkayla Sheridan	2:09.82
50 m breaststroke	Leiston Pickett	30.24	Leisel Jones	31.13	Natasha Waitzer	31.36
100 m breaststroke	Leisel Jones	1:06.18	Sarah Katsoulis	1:07.24	Leiston Pickett	1:07.32
200 m breaststroke	Sally Foster	2:24.65	Sarah Katsoulis	2:24.74	Rebecca Kemp	2:26.71
50 m butterfly	Marieke Guehrer	26.42	Alice Mills	26.43	Sophie Edington	26.76
100 m butterfly	Alicia Coutts	57.25	Stephanie Rice	58.18	Jessicah Schipper	58.45
200 m butterfly	Jessicah Schipper	2:07.78	Stephanie Rice	2:07.87	Samantha Hamill	2:08.79
200 m IM	Alicia Coutts	2:10.06	Stephanie Rice	2:10.41	Tessa Wallace	2:13.35
400 m IM	Stephanie Rice	4:38.61	Samantha Hamill	4:40.43	Blair Evans	4:40.86
