= 2012 Australian Swimming Championships =

The 2012 Australian Swimming Championships were held from 15 March until 22 March 2012 at the South Australia Aquatic and Leisure Centre in Adelaide, South Australia. They doubled up as the national trials for the 2012 Summer Olympics.

== Qualification criteria ==
Event	Men	Women
50m freestyle	22.11	25.27
100m freestyle	48.82	54.57
200m freestyle	1:47.82	1:58.33
400m freestyle	3:48.92	4:09.35
800m freestyle	—	8:33.84
1500m freestyle	15:11.83	—
100m backstroke	54.40	1:00.82
200m backstroke	1:58.48	2:10.84
100m breaststroke	1:00.79	1:08.49
200m breaststroke	2:11.74	2:26.89
100m butterfly	52.36	58.70
200m butterfly	1:56.86	2:08.95
200m IM	2:00.17	2:13.36
400m IM	4:16.36	4:41.75

== Medal winners ==
=== Men's events ===
Event	Gold		Silver		Bronze	
50 m freestyle	James Magnussen; SOPAC (NSW)	21.74	Eamon Sullivan; SOPAC (NSW)	21.92	Matthew Abood; Cranbrook Eastern Edge (NSW)	21.94
100 m freestyle	James Magnussen; SOPAC (NSW)	47.10; ACR	James Roberts; Somerset (Qld)	47.63	Matt Targett; Melbourne Vicentre (Vic)	48.32
200 m freestyle	Thomas Fraser-Holmes; Miami (Qld)	1:46.88	Kenrick Monk; St Peters Western (Qld)	1:47.16	David McKeon; Wests Illawarra (NSW)	1:47.55
400 m freestyle	David McKeon; Wests Illawarra (NSW)	3:46.36	Ryan Napoleon; St Peters Western (Qld)	3:47.93	Robert Hurley; SOPAC (NSW)	3:48.60
800 m freestyle	David McKeon; Wests Illawarra (NSW)	7:57.22	Jarrod Poort; Wests Illawarra (NSW)	8:05.73	Matthew Terry; Redcliffe Leagues (Qld)	8:07.28
1500 m freestyle	Jarrod Poort; Wests Illawarra (NSW)	15:13.38	Mack Horton; Melbourne Vicentre (Vic)	15:14.73	George O'Brien; Kawana Waters (Qld)	15:18.52
50 m backstroke	Benjamin Treffers; Burley Griffin (ACT)	25.19	Daniel Arnamnart; SOPAC (NSW)	25.41	Max Ackermann; Chandler (Qld)	53.98
100 m backstroke	Hayden Stoeckel; Berri (SA)	53.98	Daniel Arnamnart; SOPAC (NSW)	54.05	Benjamin Treffers; Burley Griffin (ACT)	54.16
200 m backstroke	Mitch Larkin; St Peters Western (Qld)	1:57.90	Matson Lawson; Tigersharks (Vic)	1:58.32	Joshua Beaver; Tigersharks (Vic)	1:58.58
50 m breaststroke	Christian Sprenger; Indooroopilly (Qld)	27.43	Brenton Rickard; Southport Olympic (Qld)	27.97	Joshua Palmer; LeFevre Portside (SA)	28.39
100 m breaststroke	Christian Sprenger; Indooroopilly (Qld)	59.91	Brenton Rickard; Southport Olympic (Qld)	1:00.13	Jeremy Meyer; Traralgon (Vic)	1:01.82
200 m breaststroke	Brenton Rickard; Southport Olympic (Qld)	2:11.03	Jeremy Meyer; Traralgon (Vic)	2:12.76	Nicholas Schafer; River City Rapids (Qld)	2:12.96
50 m butterfly	Chris Wright; Southport Olympic (Qld)	23.79	Daniel Lester; Lawnton (Qld)	23.81	Ryan Pini; Papua New Guinea	23.87
100 m butterfly	Chris Wright; Southport Olympic (Qld)	51.67	Jayden Hadler; SOPAC (NSW)	52.09	Matt Targett; Melbourne Vicentre (Vic)	52.24
200 m butterfly	Nick D'Arcy; SOPAC (NSW)	1:54.71	Chris Wright; Southport Olympic (Qld)	1:56.40	Grant Irvine; St Peters Western (Qld)	1:56.67
200 m IM	Daniel Tranter; SOPAC (NSW)	1:58.19	Jayden Hadler; SOPAC (NSW)	1:58.99	Thomas Fraser-Holmes; Miami (Qld)	1:59.02
400 m IM	Thomas Fraser-Holmes; Miami (Qld)	4:11.81; OR	Daniel Tranter; SOPAC (NSW)	4:16.38	Mitch Larkin; St Peters Western (Qld)	4:18.38
4 × 100 m freestyle relay	Cranbrook Eastern Edge A (NSW); Andrew Abood (51.17); Matthew Abood (49.11); Mitchell Patterson (50.77); Tom Miller (50.13)	3:21.18	SOPAC A (NSW); Te Haumi Maxwell (51.80); Jayden Hadler (49.82); Eamon Sullivan (49.88); Mitchell Dixon (50.34)	3:21.84	Melbourne Vicentre A (Vic); Lloyd Townsing (50.87); Daniel Blackborrow (51.61); Phil Butcher (52.50); Cameron Prosser (49.62)	3:24.60
4 × 200 m freestyle relay	Melbourne Vicentre A (Vic); Mack Horton (1:55.60); Andrew Cameron (1:54.37); Daniel Blackborrow (1:54.13); Jack Gerrard (1:54.67)	7:38.77	Carlile A (NSW); Tim Harris (1:57.10); Nick Robertson (1:57.01); Sho Nishimoto (V) (1:56.22); Luke Stirton (1:52.02)	7:42.35	Norwood A (SA); Nick Clarke (1:54.17); Luke Curtis (1:55.20); Kyle Chalmers (1:58.54); Cameron Wong (1:56.14)	7:44.05
4 × 100 m medley relay	Melbourne Vicentre A (Vic); Daniel Blackborrow (56.10); Justin Woolley (1:05.56); Matthew Targett (52.76); Cameron Prosser (50.40)	3:44.82	Arena A (WA); Bobby Jovanovich (56.04); Lennard Bremer (1:04.37); Ben Lindsay (54.70); Patrick Hoey (51.28)	3:46.39	Tigersharks A (Vic); Joshua Beaver (55.52); Tyrone Dobrunz (1:05.93); Mitchell Pratt (55.77); Matson Lawson (51.23)	3:48.45

Legend: WR – World record; CR – Commonwealth record; OR – Oceanian record; AR – Australian record; ACR – Australian All Comers record; Club – Australian Club record

=== Women's events ===
Event	Gold		Silver		Bronze	
50 m freestyle	Cate Campbell; Indooroopilly (Qld)	24.44	Bronte Campbell; Indooroopilly (Qld)	24.61	Yolane Kukla; St Peters Western (Qld)	24.76
100 m freestyle	Melanie Schlanger; Southport Olympic (Qld)	53.85	Cate Campbell; Indooroopilly (Qld)	54.01	Brittany Elmslie; Nudgee Brothers (Qld); Yolane Kukla; St Peters Western (Qld)	54.08
200 m freestyle	Bronte Barratt; St Peters Western (Qld)	1:55.99	Kylie Palmer; Chandler (Qld)	1:56.04	Melanie Schlanger; Southport Olympic (Qld)	1:56.73
400 m freestyle	Kylie Palmer; Chandler (Qld)	4:03.40; AR	Bronte Barratt; St Peters Western (Qld)	4:05.74	Remy Fairweather; Kawana Waters (Qld)	4:08.63
800 m freestyle	Kylie Palmer; Chandler (Qld)	8:26.60	Jessica Ashwood; SOPAC (NSW)	8:27.97	Melissa Gorman; Redcliffe Leagues (Qld)	8:29.73
1500 m freestyle	Melissa Gorman; Redcliffe Leagues (Qld)	16:27.50	Kareena Lee; Unattached (Qld)	17:05.97	Leah Cutting; Norwood (SA)	17:08.86
50 m backstroke	Emily Seebohm; Nudgee Brothers (Qld)	28.03	Sophie Edington; Melbourne Vicentre (Vic)	28.04	Hayley Baker; Melbourne Vicentre (Vic)	28.87
100 m backstroke	Emily Seebohm; Nudgee Brothers (Qld)	59.28	Belinda Hocking; Albury (NSW)	59.41	Sophie Edington; Melbourne Vicentre (Vic)	1:00.65
200 m backstroke	Belinda Hocking; Albury (NSW)	2:06.68; ACR	Meagen Nay; St Peters Western (Qld)	2:07.83	Mikkayla Sheridan; Chandler (Qld)	2:10.33
50 m breaststroke	Leiston Pickett; Southport Olympic (Qld)	30.68	Sarah Katsoulis; Nunawading (Vic)	31.28	Lorna Tonks; Redcliffe Leagues (Qld)	31.56
100 m breaststroke	Leiston Pickett; Southport Olympic (Qld)	1:06.88	Leisel Jones; Unattached (Qld)	1:07.64	Sarah Katsoulis; Nunawading (Vic)	1:08.11
200 m breaststroke	Tessa Wallace; Pelican Waters (Qld)	2:26.31	Sally Foster; Central Aquatic (WA)	2:26.51	Taylor McKeown; Australian Crawl (Qld)	2:26.90
50 m butterfly	Alice Tait; Southport Olympic (Qld)	26.59	Jessicah Schipper; Chandler (Qld)	26.65	Brianna Throssell; City of Perth (WA)	26.76
100 m butterfly	Alicia Coutts; Redlands (Qld)	57.59	Jessicah Schipper; Chandler (Qld)	57.88	Libby Trickett; Chandler (Qld)	58.64
200 m butterfly	Jessicah Schipper; Chandler (Qld)	2:06.93	Samantha Hamill; Kawana Waters (Qld)	2:08.92	Amy Smith; St Peters Western (Qld)	2:10.71
200 m IM	Stephanie Rice; St Peters Western (Qld)	2:09.38	Alicia Coutts; Redlands (Qld)	2:09.83	Emily Seebohm; Nudgee Brothers (Qld)	2:12.37
400 m IM	Stephanie Rice; St Peters Western (Qld)	4:33.45	Blair Evans; City of Perth (WA)	4:37.80	Samantha Hamill; Kawana Waters (Qld)	4:42.69
4 × 100 m freestyle relay	Carlile A (NSW); Leanne Wright (56.84); Georgia Miller (57.48); Alicia Caldwell (57.61); Ami Matsuo (55.30)	3:47.23	Nunawading (Vic); Belinda Parslow (57.17); Belinda Bennett (57.10); Ellese Zalewski (56.27); Samantha Bennett (57.48)	3:48.02	Norwood A (SA); Sumin Song (V) (57.56); Emma Duncan (57.59); Lauren Mathews (58.14); Jenni O'Neil (57.70)	3:50.99
4 × 200 m freestyle relay	Nunawading (Vic); Belinda Parslow (2:01.06); Belinda Bennett (2:04.36); Ellese Zalewski (2:04.45); Samantha Bennett (2:04.56)	8:14.43	Norwood A (SA); Sumin Song (V) (2:03.19); Leah Cutting (2:05.00); Emma Duncan (2:05.29); Jenni O'Neil (2:05.03)	8:18.51	Carlile A (NSW); Leanne Wright (2:07.51); Georgia Miller (2:05.26); Jessie Quinn (2:09.13); Alicia Caldwell (2:05.16)	8:27.06
4 × 100 m medley relay	Melbourne Vicentre A (Vic); Sophie Edington (1:01.44); Samantha Marshall (1:08.75); Marieke Guehrer (1:00.70); Jessica Morrison (56.66)	4:07.55	Nunawading (Vic); Samantha Bennett (1:04.77); Sarah Katsoulis (1:07.49); Ellese Zalewski (1:01.21); Belinda Parslow (56.22)	4:09.69	Norwood A (SA); Jenni O'Neil (1:02.46); Amelia Dahlitz (1:11.79); Jackie Staples (1:01.46); Sumin Song (V) (56.94)	4:12.65

Legend: WR – World record; CR – Commonwealth record; OR – Oceanian record; AR – Australian record; ACR – Australian All Comers record; Club – Australian Club record
