= 2014 Pan Pacific Swimming Championships – Men's 200 metre butterfly =

Men's 200 metre butterfly at the 2014 Pan Pacific Swimming Championships
- Venue: Gold Coast Aquatic Centre
- Dates: August 21, 2014 (heats & finals)
- Competitors: 13
- Winning time: 1:54.92

Medalists
| gold medal | Daiya Seto | Japan |
| silver medal | Leonardo de Deus | Brazil |
| bronze medal | Tyler Clary | United States |

The men's 200 metre butterfly competition at the 2014 Pan Pacific Swimming Championships took place on August 21 at the Gold Coast Aquatic Centre. The last champion was Michael Phelps of US.

This race consisted of four lengths of the pool, all lengths being in butterfly stroke.

== Records ==
Prior to this competition, the existing world and Pan Pacific records were as follows:

| World record | Michael Phelps (USA) | 1:51.51 | Rome, Italy | July 29, 2009 |
| Pan Pacific Championships record | Michael Phelps (USA) | 1:53.80 | Victoria, Canada | August 17, 2006 |

== Results ==
All times are in minutes and seconds.

| KEY: | q | Fastest non-qualifiers | Q | Qualified | CR | Championships record | NR | National record | PB | Personal best | SB | Seasonal best |

=== Heats ===
The first round was held on August 21, at 11:47.

| Rank | Name | Nationality | Time | Notes |
|---|---|---|---|---|
| 1 | Daiya Seto | Japan | 1:55.29 | QA |
| 2 | Leonardo de Deus | Brazil | 1:55.33 | QA |
| 3 | Masato Sakai | Japan | 1:55.52 | QA |
| 4 | Tyler Clary | United States | 1:55.92 | QA |
| 5 | Kenta Hirai | Japan | 1:56.42 | QA |
| 6 | Takeshi Matsuda | Japan | 1:57.02 | QA |
| 7 | Chase Kalisz | United States | 1:58.25 | QA |
| 8 | Mack Darragh | Canada | 1:58.63 | QA |
| 9 | Michael Meyer | South Africa | 1:59.74 | QB |
| 10 | Gamal Assaad | Canada | 2:03.12 | QB |
| 11 | Wei Haobo | China | 2:05.10 | QB |
| 12 | Coleman Allen | Canada | 2:05.25 | QB |
| 13 | David Wong | Hong Kong | 2:12.67 | QB |
| - | Tom Shields | United States | DSQ | |

=== B Final ===
The B final was held on August 21, at 20:59.

| Rank | Name | Nationality | Time | Notes |
|---|---|---|---|---|
| 9 | Kenta Hirai | Japan | 1:58.94 | |
| 10 | David Wong | Hong Kong | 2:06.91 | |

=== A Final ===
The A final was held on August 21, at 20:59.

| Rank | Name | Nationality | Time | Notes |
|---|---|---|---|---|
| 1st place, gold medalist(s) | Daiya Seto | Japan | 1:54.92 | |
| 2nd place, silver medalist(s) | Leonardo de Deus | Brazil | 1:55.28 | |
| 3rd place, bronze medalist(s) | Tyler Clary | United States | 1:55.42 | |
| 4 | Masato Sakai | Japan | 1:56.64 | |
| 5 | Michael Meyer | South Africa | 1:58.33 | |
| 6 | Mack Darragh | Canada | 1:58.52 | |
| 7 | Gamal Assaad | Canada | 2:02.99 | |
| - | Wei Haobo | China | 2:03.22 | |
