= 2010 Pan Pacific Swimming Championships – Men's 200 metre individual medley =

Men's 200 metre individual medley at the 2010 Pan Pacific Swimming Championships
- Venue: William Woollett Jr. Aquatics Center
- Dates: August 21, 2010 (heats & finals)
- Competitors: 25 from 11 nations
- Winning time: 1:54.43

Medalists
gold medal	Ryan Lochte	United States
silver medal	Tyler Clary	United States
bronze medal	Thiago Pereira	Brazil

The men's 200 metre individual medley competition at the 2010 Pan Pacific Swimming Championships took place on August 21 at the William Woollett Jr. Aquatics Center. The last champion was Michael Phelps of US.

This race consisted of four lengths of the pool, one each in backstroke, breaststroke, butterfly and freestyle swimming.

== Records ==
Prior to this competition, the existing world and Pan Pacific records were as follows:

World record	Ryan Lochte (USA)	1:54.10	Rome, Italy	July 30, 2009
Pan Pacific Championships record	Michael Phelps (USA)	1:55.84	Victoria, Canada	August 20, 2006

== Results ==
All times are in minutes and seconds.

KEY:	q	Fastest non-qualifiers	Q	Qualified	CR	Championships record	NR	National record	PB	Personal best	SB	Seasonal best

=== Heats ===
The first round was held on August 21, at 10:16.

Rank	Heat	Lane	Name	Nationality	Time	Notes
1	4	4	Ryan Lochte	United States	1:58.03	QA
2	3	3	Tyler Clary	United States	1:58.56	QA
3	3	5	Ken Takakuwa	Japan	1:58.72	QA
4	4	3	Henrique Rodrigues	Brazil	1:59.37	QA
5	4	5	Leith Brodie	Australia	1:59.86	QA
6	3	4	Thiago Pereira	Brazil	1:59.88	QA
7	2	3	Kosuke Hagino	Japan	2:01.19	QA
8	4	6	Yuya Horihata	Japan	2:01.32	QA
9	3	7	Diogo Yabe	Brazil	2:01.91	QB
10	2	7	Robert Margalis	United States	2:02.21	QB
11	3	6	Tommaso D'Orsogna	Australia	2:02.37	QB
12	2	5	André Schultz	Brazil	2:02.50	QB
13	2	8	Yuki Kobori	Japan	2:02.74	QB
14	1	4	Andrew Ford	Canada	2:02.79	QB
15	2	6	Kim Mingyu	South Korea	2:03.66	QB
16	3	2	Thomas Fraser-Holmes	Australia	2:03.76	QB
17	3	1	Tobias Oriwol	Canada	2:03.81	
18	4	8	Wu Peng	China	2:03.87	
19	4	7	Sebastian Rousseau	South Africa	2:03.98	
20	2	1	Jayden Hadler	Australia	2:04.45	
21	4	1	Taki Mrabet	Tunisia	2:04.62	
22	3	8	Lucas Salatta	Brazil	2:07.19	
23	1	7	Esteban Enderica	Ecuador	2:07.92	
24	1	2	Jordan Hartney	Canada	2:08.34	
25	1	3	Sebastian Jahnsen	Peru	2:11.50	
-	1	5	Hsu Chi-Chieh	Chinese Taipei	DNS	
-	1	6	Choi Kyu-Woong	South Korea	DNS	
-	2	2	Daniel Bell	New Zealand	DNS	
-	2	4	Michael Phelps	United States	DNS	
-	4	2	Brian Johns	Canada	DNS	

=== B Final ===
The B final was held on August 21, at 18:35.

Rank	Lane	Name	Nationality	Time	Notes
9	4	Yuya Horihata	Japan	2:01.01	
10	2	Robert Margalis	United States	2:01.41	
11	1	Andrew Ford	Canada	2:01.58	
12	3	Thomas Fraser-Holmes	Australia	2:02.19	
13	3	Tobias Oriwol	Canada	2:02.84	
14	3	Diogo Yabe	Brazil	2:03.02	
15	2	Kim Mingyu	South Korea	2:04.27	
16	1	Esteban Enderica	Ecuador	2:07.69	

=== A Final ===
The A final was held on August 21, at 18:35.

Rank	Lane	Name	Nationality	Time	Notes
1st place, gold medalist(s)	4	Ryan Lochte	United States	1:54.43	CR
2nd place, silver medalist(s)	5	Tyler Clary	United States	1:57.61	
3rd place, bronze medalist(s)	7	Thiago Pereira	Brazil	1:57.83	
4	3	Ken Takakuwa	Japan	1:58.06	
5	6	Henrique Rodrigues	Brazil	1:59.00	
6	2	Leith Brodie	Australia	1:59.74	
7	1	Kosuke Hagino	Japan	2:00.97	
8	8	Tommaso D'Orsogna	Australia	2:03.99	
