= 2010 Pan Pacific Swimming Championships – Men's 400 metre individual medley =

Men's 400 metre individual medley at the 2010 Pan Pacific Swimming Championships
- Venue: William Woollett Jr. Aquatics Center
- Dates: August 19, 2010 (heats & finals)
- Competitors: 18 from 9 nations
- Winning time: 4:07.59

Medalists
gold medal	Ryan Lochte	United States
silver medal	Tyler Clary	United States
bronze medal	Thiago Pereira	Brazil

The men's 400 metre individual medley competition at the 2010 Pan Pacific Swimming Championships took place on August 19 at the William Woollett Jr. Aquatics Center. The last champion was Michael Phelps of US.

This race consisted of eight lengths of the pool. The first two lengths were swum using the butterfly stroke, the second pair with the backstroke, the third pair of lengths in breaststroke, and the final two were freestyle.

== Records ==
Prior to this competition, the existing world and Pan Pacific records were as follows:

World record	Michael Phelps (USA)	4:03.84	Beijing, China	August 10, 2008
Pan Pacific Championships record	Michael Phelps (USA)	4:10.47	Victoria, Canada	August 18, 2006

== Results ==
All times are in minutes and seconds.

KEY:	q	Fastest non-qualifiers	Q	Qualified	CR	Championships record	NR	National record	PB	Personal best	SB	Seasonal best

=== Heats ===
The first round was held on August 19, at 11:14. As only two members of each nation can enter Final A, Michael Phelps, despite finishing with the fourth fastest time, was the third fastest American, therefore could not compete in Final A. He did not participate in Final B either.

Rank	Heat	Lane	Name	Nationality	Time	Notes
1	1	4	Ryan Lochte	United States	4:08.77	QA, CR
2	1	5	Tyler Clary	United States	4:09.20	QA
3	2	4	Thiago Pereira	Brazil	4:15.35	QA
4	3	4	Michael Phelps	United States	4:15.38	~~QB~~ 3rd American
5	2	5	Yuya Horihata	Japan	4:16.44	QA
6	2	3	Brian Johns	Canada	4:16.50	QA
7	1	3	Robert Margalis	United States	4:17.16	QB 4th American
8	3	2	Ken Takakuwa	Japan	4:17.40	QA
9	1	6	Andrew Gemmell	United States	4:17.75	QB 5th American
10	3	6	Kosuke Hagino	Japan	4:19.02	QB 3rd Japanese
11	3	1	Andrew Ford	Canada	4:21.22	QA
12	2	2	Jordan Hartney	Canada	4:21.31	QB 3rd Canadian
13	1	2	Jayden Hadler	Australia	4:23.25	QA
14	1	7	Taki Mrabet	Tunisia	4:26.10	QB
15	3	7	Diogo Yabe	Brazil	4:27.22	QB
16	2	7	Sebastian Rousseau	South Africa	4:29.07	QB
17	3	3	Kim Mingyu	South Korea	4:29.27	
18	2	1	Esteban Enderica	Ecuador	4:31.20	QB
-	3	5	Oussama Mellouli	Tunisia	DNS	
-	2	6	Thomas Fraser-Holmes	Australia	DSQ	

=== B Final ===
The B final was held on August 19, at 19:18.

Rank	Lane	Name	Nationality	Time	Notes
9	4	Robert Margalis	United States	4:17.28	
10	3	Jordan Hartney	Canada	4:19.04	
11	8	Andrew Gemmell	United States	4:19.69	
12	5	Kosuke Hagino	Japan	4:21.95	
13	6	Taki Mrabet	Tunisia	4:24.47	
14	7	Kim Mingyu	South Korea	4:26.00	
15	2	Diogo Yabe	Brazil	4:28.47	
16	1	Esteban Enderica	Ecuador	4:32.28	

=== A Final ===
The A final was held on August 19, at 19:18.

Rank	Lane	Name	Nationality	Time	Notes
1st place, gold medalist(s)	4	Ryan Lochte	United States	4:07.59	CR
2nd place, silver medalist(s)	5	Tyler Clary	United States	4:09.55	
3rd place, bronze medalist(s)	3	Thiago Pereira	Brazil	4:12.09	
4	6	Yuya Horihata	Japan	4:15.93	
5	2	Brian Johns	Canada	4:16.21	
6	7	Ken Takakuwa	Japan	4:17.47	
7	1	Andrew Ford	Canada	4:21.66	
8	8	Jayden Hadler	Australia	4:23.72	
