= Swimming at the 2007 Pan American Games – Men's 200 metre backstroke =

The Men's 200m Backstroke event at the 2007 Pan American Games took place at the Maria Lenk Aquatic Park in Rio de Janeiro, Brazil on 18 & 19 July. A total of 15 swimmers initially swam the race.

== Medalists ==
Gold	Thiago Pereira; Brazil
Silver	Tyler Clary; United States
Bronze	Lucas Salatta; Brazil

== Results ==
Rank	Swimmer	Semifinals		Final
Rank	Swimmer	Time	Rank	Time
1	Thiago Pereira (BRA)	2:02.60	6	1:58.42
2	Tyler Clary (USA)	1:58.78	1	1:59.24
3	Lucas Salatta (BRA)	2:00.04	3	1:59.51
4	Matthew Hawes (CAN)	1:59.29	2	1:59.75
5	Charles Francis (CAN)	2:00.84	5	2:00.64
6	Omar Pinzón (COL)	2:03.25	8	2:02.06
7	Ian Clark (USA)	2:00.61	4	2:02.27
8	Nicholas Neckles (BAR)	2:03.60	9	2:04.27
9	Bradley Ally (BAR)	2:02.71		
10	Pedro Medel (CUB)	2:06.59		
11	Joaquin Belza (ARG)	2:06.85		
12	Brett Fraser (CAY)	2:07.23		
13	David Rodriguez (CUB)	2:07.74		
14	Reymer Vezga (VEN)	2:09.45		
15	Kieran Locke (ISV)	2:10.53		
