= 2010 FINA World Swimming Championships (25 m) – Men's 400 metre individual medley =

Men's 400m I.M. at the 2010 Short Course Worlds
- Dates: 16 December 2010
- Competitors: 35
- Winning time: 3:55.50 WR

Medalists
gold medal	Ryan Lochte	United States
silver medal	Oussama Mellouli	Tunisia
bronze medal	Tyler Clary	United States

The Men's 400 Individual Medley (or "I.M.") at the 10th FINA World Swimming Championships (25m) was swum on 16 December 2010 in Dubai, United Arab Emirates. 35 individuals swam in the Preliminary heats of the event in the morning, with the top-8 finishers advancing on the Final that evening.

At the start of the event, the existing World (WR) and Championship records (CR) were:

	Name	Nation	Time	Location	Date
WR	László Cseh	Hungary	3:57.27	Istanbul	11 December 2009
CR	Ryan Lochte	United States	4:02.49	Shanghai	6 April 2006

The following records were established during the competition:

Date	Round	Name	Nation	Time	WR	CR
16 December 2010	Heats	Ryan Lochte	United States	4:01.76		CR
16 December 2010	Final	Ryan Lochte	United States	3:55.50	WR	CR

== Results ==
=== Heats ===
Rank	Heat	Lane	Name	Time	Notes
1	3	4	Ryan Lochte (USA)	4:01.76	Q, CR
2	3	5	Oussama Mellouli (TUN)	4:02.27	Q
3	4	5	Tyler Clary (USA)	4:03.02	Q
4	3	6	Chad le Clos (RSA)	4:03.81	Q
5	4	4	Dávid Verrasztó (HUN)	4:04.11	Q
6	5	4	László Cseh (HUN)	4:04.44	Q
7	5	5	Gal Nevo (ISR)	4:06.78	Q
8	4	2	Alexander Tikhonov (RUS)	4:06.96	Q
9	1	3	Wang Chengxiang (CHN)	4:07.26	
10	5	3	Lukasz Wojt (POL)	4:08.05	
11	3	3	Diogo Carvalho (POR)	4:08.08	
12	1	5	Huang Chaosheng (CHN)	4:08.14	
13	4	3	Federico Turrini (ITA)	4:09.04	
14	5	6	Jayden Hadler (AUS)	4:09.74	
15	5	7	Ioannis Drymonakos (GRE)	4:11.13	
16	5	2	Henrique Rodrigues (BRA)	4:11.47	
17	4	7	Diogo Yabe (BRA)	4:12.91	
18	4	6	Luca Marin (ITA)	4:13.32	
19	3	7	Raphaël Stacchiotti (LUX)	4:13.85	
20	3	1	Esteban Enderica (ECU)	4:16.38	
21	2	5	Aleksey Derlyugov (UZB)	4:16.62	
22	3	2	Pedro Miguel Pinotes (ANG)	4:18.52	
23	5	8	Esteban Paz (ARG)	4:23.69	
24	4	1	Vasilii Danilov (KGZ)	4:24.26	
25	2	7	Saeed Malekae Ashtiani (IRI)	4:24.81	
26	4	8	Chu Kevin Kam Yin (HKG)	4:27.78	
27	2	6	Dmitriy Shvetsov (UZB)	4:28.06	
28	3	8	Morad Berrada (MAR)	4:28.74	
29	2	1	Jean Luis Apolinar Gomez Nuñez (DOM)	4:28.87	
30	2	4	Vo Thai Nguyen (VIE)	4:31.10	
31	2	3	Edvin Angjeli (ALB)	4:35.22	
32	2	8	Obaid Al-Jasmi (UAE)	4:36.89	
33	2	2	Yousef Alaskari (KUW)	4:37.23	
34	1	4	Jourdy Martis (AHO)	4:41.45	
–	5	1	Taki Mrabet (TUN)	DSQ	

=== Final ===
Rank	Lane	Name	Time	Notes
1st place, gold medalist(s)	4	Ryan Lochte (USA)	3:55.50	WR
2nd place, silver medalist(s)	5	Oussama Mellouli (TUN)	3:57.40	
3rd place, bronze medalist(s)	3	Tyler Clary (USA)	3:57.56	
4	2	Dávid Verrasztó (HUN)	4:02.73	
5	6	Chad le Clos (RSA)	4:03.76	
6	7	László Cseh (HUN)	4:04.93	
7	1	Gal Nevo (ISR)	4:05.26	
8	8	Alexander Tikhonov (RUS)	4:06.39	
