= 2010 FINA World Swimming Championships (25 m) – Men's 200 metre individual medley =

Men's 200m IM at the 2010 FINA World Swimming Championships (25 m)
- Dates: 17 December 2010
- Competitors: 57
- Winning time: 1:50.08 WR

Medalists
gold medal	Ryan Lochte	United States
silver medal	Markus Rogan	Austria
bronze medal	Tyler Clary	United States

The Men's 200 Individual Medley (or "I.M.") at the 10th FINA World Swimming Championships (25m) was swum on 17 December 2010 in Dubai, United Arab Emirates. 57 individuals swam in the Preliminary heats in the morning, from which the top-8 finishers advanced to swim again in the Final that evening.

At the start of the event, the existing World (WR) and Championship records (CR) were:

	Name	Nation	Time	Location	Date
WR	Darian Townsend	South Africa	1:51.55	Berlin	15 December 2009
CR	Ryan Lochte	United States	1:51.56	Manchester	11 April 2008

The following records were established during the competition:

Date	Round	Name	Nation	Time	WR	CR
17 December 2010	Final	Ryan Lochte	United States	1:50.08	WR	CR

== Results ==
=== Heats ===
Rank	Heat	Lane	Name	Time	Notes
1	8	4	Ryan Lochte (USA)	1:53.39	Q
2	7	4	Markus Rogan (AUT)	1:53.66	Q
3	7	3	Henrique Rodrigues (BRA)	1:53.96	Q
4	8	5	Tyler Clary (USA)	1:54.69	Q
5	8	3	Vytautas Janušaitis (LTU)	1:54.80	Q
6	8	1	Kenneth To (AUS)	1:54.88	Q
7	6	5	Dinko Jukić (AUT)	1:55.14	Q
8	6	2	Tommaso D'Orsogna (AUS)	1:55.41	Q
9	8	6	Gal Nevo (ISR)	1:55.43	
10	7	5	László Cseh (HUN)	1:55.47	
11	7	6	Diogo Carvalho (POR)	1:55.87	
12	6	8	Chad le Clos (RSA)	1:56.00	
13	7	1	Bradley Ally (BAR)	1:56.11	
14	5	6	Takuro Fujii (JPN)	1:56.17	
15	4	5	Shaune Fraser (CAY)	1:56.21	
16	8	2	Dávid Verrasztó (HUN)	1:56.29	
17	7	7	Omar Pinzón (COL)	1:56.35	NR
18	8	7	Simon Sjödin (SWE)	1:56.36	
19	6	7	Marcin Cieślak (POL)	1:56.59	
20	6	6	Alexander Tikhonov (RUS)	1:57.27	
21	7	2	Federico Turrini (ITA)	1:57.39	
22	6	3	Lukasz Wojt (POL)	1:57.44	
23	5	2	Taki Mrabet (TUN)	1:57.98	
24	5	4	Pavel Sankovich (BLR)	1:58.01	
25	8	8	Diogo Yabe (BRA)	1:58.36	
26	6	1	Tomáš Fucík (CZE)	1:58.54	
27	4	3	Aleksey Derlyugov (UZB)	1:58.69	
28	7	8	Raphaël Stacchiotti (LUX)	1:59.13	
29	1	5	Huang Chaoseng (CHN)	1:59.23	
30	1	3	Wang Chengxiang (CHN)	1:59.76	
31	5	3	Alexander Broberg Skeltved (NOR)	2:00.61	
32	5	8	Vasilii Danilov (KGZ)	2:01.94	
33	5	7	Saeed Malekae Ashtiani (IRI)	2:02.74	
34	3	4	Andres Montoya (COL)	2:02.82	
35	3	3	Jean Luis Apolinar Gomez Nuñes (DOM)	2:03.17	
36	5	1	Ensar Hajder (BIH)	2:03.31	
37	4	2	Dmitriy Shvetsov (UZB)	2:03.64	
38	4	1	Chu Kevin Kam Yin (HKG)	2:04.44	
39	5	5	Pedro Miguel Pinotes (ANG)	2:05.20	
40	2	5	Jourdy Martis (AHO)	2:06.93	
41	3	5	Giorgi Mtvralashvili (GEO)	2:07.13	
42	3	1	Nicholas James (ZIM)	2:07.60	
43	4	6	Edvin Angjeli (ALB)	2:07.88	
44	4	7	Obaid Al-Jasmi (UAE)	2:08.64	
45	4	4	Yousef Alaskari (KUW)	2:08.68	
46	3	2	Quinton Delie (NAM)	2:09.77	
47	3	7	Colin Bensadon (GIB)	2:11.50	
48	3	6	Loai Abdulwahid Tashkandi (KSA)	2:12.57	
49	3	8	Chou Kit (MAC)	2:13.32	
50	2	4	James Sanderson (GIB)	2:15.03	
51	4	8	Ali Al Kaabi (UAE)	2:15.31	
52	2	3	Nisar Ahmed (PAK)	2:20.53	
53	2	7	Ahmed Atari (QAT)	2:25.29	
54	2	2	Hamdan Iqbal Bayusuf (KEN)	2:25.44	
–	1	4	Kouassi Franck Olivier Brou (CIV)	DNS	
–	2	6	Tano Pierre Claver Atta (CIV)	DNS	
–	6	4	Markus Deibler (GER)	DNS	

=== Final ===
Rank	Lane	Name	Time	Notes
1st place, gold medalist(s)	4	Ryan Lochte (USA)	1:50.08	WR
2nd place, silver medalist(s)	5	Markus Rogan (AUT)	1:52.90	
3rd place, bronze medalist(s)	6	Tyler Clary (USA)	1:53.56	
4	3	Henrique Rodrigues (BRA)	1:54.20	
5	2	Vytautas Janušaitis (LTU)	1:54.79	
6	7	Kenneth To (AUS)	1:55.64	
7	1	Dinko Jukić (AUT)	1:56.51	
8	8	Tommaso D'Orsogna (AUS)	1:57.12	
