= 2012 FINA World Swimming Championships (25 m) – Men's 200 metre individual medley =

Men's 200m Individual Medley at the 2012 Short Course Worlds
- Dates: 14 December (heats and final)
- Winning time: 1:49.63 WR

Medalists
gold medal	Ryan Lochte	United States
silver medal	Daiya Seto	Japan
bronze medal	László Cseh	Hungary

The men's 200 metre individual medley event at the 11th FINA World Swimming Championships (25m) took place 14 December 2012 at the Sinan Erdem Dome. The event was won by American Ryan Lochte. In the final, Lochte broke his own world record of 1:50.08 set in 2010 with a time of 1:49.63, thus becoming the first individual under 1:50 in the event.

== Records ==
Prior to this competition, the existing world and championship records were as follows.

	Name	Nation	Time	Location	Date
World record Championship record	Ryan Lochte	United States	1:50.08	Dubai	17 December 2010

The following records were established during the competition:

Date	Event	Name	Nation	Time	Record
14 December	Final	Ryan Lochte	United States	1:49.63	WR

== Results ==
=== Heats ===
Rank	Heat	Lane	Name	Time	Notes
1	4	4	Ryan Lochte (USA)	1:53.31	Q
2	6	5	Kenneth To (AUS)	1:53.57	Q
3	6	4	Daiya Seto (JPN)	1:54.41	Q
4	5	4	László Cseh (HUN)	1:54.50	Q
5	4	3	Conor Dwyer (USA)	1:54.67	Q
6	5	2	Simon Sjödin (SWE)	1:54.90	Q, NR
7	6	6	Diogo Carvalho (POR)	1:55.14	Q
8	5	5	Kosuke Hagino (JPN)	1:55.41	Q
9	4	5	Gal Nevo (ISR)	1:55.72	
10	6	3	Travis Mahoney (AUS)	1:55.98	
11	4	1	Jan Świtkowski (POL)	1:56.16	
12	4	6	Dávid Verrasztó (HUN)	1:56.22	
13	4	0	Liu Weijia (CHN)	1:56.64	
14	5	1	Aleksey Derlyugov (UZB)	1:57.51	
15	5	8	Andreas Vazaios (GRE)	1:57.90	
16	4	7	Jakub Maly (AUT)	1:57.98	
17	6	7	Daniel Skaaning (DEN)	1:58.07	
18	3	5	Lukas Räuftlin (SUI)	1:58.09	NR
19	4	2	Pavel Sankovich (BLR)	1:58.21	
20	6	2	Dmitry Zhilin (RUS)	1:58.24	
21	5	0	Roberto Pavoni (GBR)	1:58.36	
22	6	0	Michal Poprawa (POL)	1:58.38	
23	5	7	Yury Suvorau (BLR)	1:58.43	
24	3	2	Jake Tapp (CAN)	1:58.45	
25	5	6	Viatcheslav Andrusenko (RUS)	1:58.69	
26	4	8	Michael Meyer (RSA)	1:59.45	
27	5	3	Thiago Simon (BRA)	1:59.68	
28	6	9	Ieuan Lloyd (GBR)	1:59.90	
29	6	8	Taki Mrabet (TUN)	1:59.92	
30	6	1	Victor Bromer (DEN)	1:59.95	
31	3	4	Christoph Meier (LIE)	2:01.25	NR
32	3	1	Quah Zheng Wen (SIN)	2:02.43	NR
33	5	9	Vasilii Danilov (KGZ)	2:03.26	
34	3	6	Ayman Klzie (SYR)	2:03.89	
35	3	7	Jean Luis Gómez (DOM)	2:04.18	
36	3	3	Pang Sheng Jun (SIN)	2:04.30	
37	3	8	Agnishwar Jayaprakash (IND)	2:05.62	
38	2	5	Eliebenezer San Jose Wong (NMI)	2:05.84	
39	4	9	Ng Chun Nam Derick (HKG)	2:06.05	
40	1	8	Wu Peng (CHN)	2:06.99	
41	1	2	Charles Alexander Keller (PAN)	2:07.30	
42	2	4	Colin Bensadon (GIB)	2:07.88	
43	2	3	Arvind Mani (IND)	2:08.77	
44	2	9	Awse Ma'aya (JOR)	2:09.34	
45	2	2	Joaquin Sepulveda (CHI)	2:09.35	
46	3	0	Quinton Delie (NAM)	2:10.05	
47	2	6	Ameer Adnan Ali (IRQ)	2:14.07	
48	3	9	Obaid Al-Jasmi (UAE)	2:14.14	
49	2	8	Kensuke Kimura (NMI)	2:16.17	
50	1	4	Erdenemunkh Demuul (MGL)	2:18.00	
51	1	5	Omar Omar (QAT)	2:19.96	
52	2	0	Bakr Salam Ali (IRQ)	2:21.56	
53	1	3	Franc Aleksi (ALB)	2:30.34	
54	1	6	Jamal Tamasese (SAM)	2:39.65	
	2	1	Mathieu Marquet (MRI)	DSQ	
	1	1	Luis Rafael Rojas Martinez (VEN)	DNS	
	1	7	Pavel Naroskin (EST)	DNS	
	2	7	Jordan Augier (LCA)	DNS	

=== Final ===
The final was held at 21:04.

Rank	Lane	Name	Nationality	Time	Notes
1st place, gold medalist(s)	4	Ryan Lochte	United States	1:49.63	WR
2nd place, silver medalist(s)	3	Daiya Seto	Japan	1:52.80	
3rd place, bronze medalist(s)	6	László Cseh	Hungary	1:52.89	
4	5	Kenneth To	Australia	1:53.42	
5	2	Conor Dwyer	United States	1:53.99	
6	8	Kosuke Hagino	Japan	1:54.08	
7	1	Diogo Carvalho	Portugal	1:55.63	
8	7	Simon Sjödin	Sweden	1:56.31	
