= 2009 Australian Swimming Championships =

The 2009 Telstra Australian Swimming Championships were held in Sydney, New South Wales, Australia from 17–22 March 2009. They doubled as the national trials for the 2009 World Aquatics Championships.

== Results ==
=== Men ===
Event	Gold		Silver		Bronze	
50 m freestyle	Matthew Abood	21.93	Eamon Sullivan	21.96	Ashley Callus	22.05
100 m freestyle	Eamon Sullivan	48.34	Matt Targett	48.63	Andrew Lauterstein	48.64
200 m freestyle	Patrick Murphy	1:46.85	Kenrick Monk	1:47.27	Tommaso D'Orsogna	1:48.10
400 m freestyle	Robert Hurley	3:46.64	Ryan Napoleon	3:48.02	Cameron Smith	3:51.45
800 m freestyle	Theodore Pasialis	8:01.90	Matthew Terry	8:03.96	Chris Ashwood	8:10.17
1500 m freestyle	Ryan Napoleon	15:01.99	Robert Hurley	15:18.53	Theodore Pasialis	15:20.33
50 m backstroke	Ashley Delaney	24.81 OC	Ben Treffers	25.15	Hayden Stoeckel	25.36
100 m backstroke	Ashley Delaney	53.28	Hayden Stoeckel	53.98	Robert Hurley	54.56
200 m backstroke	Ashley Delaney	1:55.82 OC	Hayden Stoeckel	1:57.38	Robert Hurley	2:00.04
50 m breaststroke	Brenton Rickard	27.68	Christian Sprenger	27.89	Karl Wurzer	28.88
100 m breaststroke	Christian Sprenger Brenton Rickard	1:00.64	None awarded		Craig Calder	1:02.33
200 m breaststroke	Christian Sprenger	2:12.04	Brenton Rickard	2:12.10	Craig Calder	2:12.97
50 m butterfly	Andrew Lauterstein	23.34	Matt Targett	23.49	Matt Jaukovic	23.62
100 m butterfly	Andrew Lauterstein	51.13	Adam Pine	52.24	Matt Jaukovic	52.56
200 m butterfly^{[a]}	Nick D'Arcy	1:54.46 NR	Chris Wright	1:56.81	Lachlan Staples	1:57.53
200 m individual medley	Leith Brodie	1:59.73	Tommaso D'Orsogna	2:01.43	Stephen Parkes	2:01.56
400 m individual medley	Stephen Parkes	4:18.64	Thomas Fraser-Holmes	4:22.07	Declan Potts	4:26.18

=== Women ===
Event	Gold		Silver		Bronze	
50 m freestyle	Libby Trickett	24.23	Cate Campbell	24.70	Marieke Guehrer	24.87
100 m freestyle	Libby Trickett	52.99	Marieke Guehrer	54.28	Felicity Galvez	54.50
200 m freestyle	Meagen Nay	1:57.90	Stephanie Rice	1:57.98	Ellen Fullerton	1:58.05
400 m freestyle	Bronte Barratt	4:08.59	Ellen Fullerton	4:09.06	Blair Evans	4:09.72
800 m freestyle	Blair Evans	8:30.86	Melissa Gorman	8:31.81	Bronte Barratt	8:43.29
1500 m freestyle	Melissa Gorman	16:28.96	Luane Rowe	16:43.42	Belinda Bennett	16:48.23
50 m backstroke	Sophie Edington	27.89	Emily Seebohm	28.17	Belinda Hocking	28.30
100 m backstroke	Emily Seebohm	59.85	Belinda Hocking	1:00.01	Sophie Edington	1:00.27
200 m backstroke	Belinda Hocking	2:08.85	Meagen Nay	2:09.90	Sophie Edington	2:11.68
50 m breaststroke	Sarah Katsoulis	30.65	Tarnee White	30.75	Leiston Pickett	30.90
100 m breaststroke^{[b]}	Leisel Jones	1:06.10	Tarnee White	1:06.99	Sarah Katsoulis	1:07.01
200 m breaststroke	Sally Foster	2:25.88	Sarah Katsoulis	2:26.09	Sarah Katsoulis	2:26.37
50 m butterfly	Marieke Guehrer	25.60 OC	Libby Trickett	26.02	Jessicah Schipper	26.21
100 m butterfly	Jessicah Schipper	56.90	Stephanie Rice	57.67	Felicity Galvez	57.79
200 m butterfly	Jessicah Schipper	2:05.93	Samantha Hamill	2:07.73	Stephanie Rice	2:07.85
200 m individual medley	Stephanie Rice	2:11.00	Emily Seebohm	2:12.75	Ellen Fullerton	2:14.16
400 m individual medley	Stephanie Rice	4:36.71	Samantha Hamill	4:40.80	Ellen Fullerton	4:42.84

== Notes ==
^{a} Nick D'Arcy initially qualified for World Championships in the 200 m butterfly, but was removed from the team after he was found guilty of causing grevious bodily harm to Simon Cowley. Third-place finisher Lachlan Staples was subsequently named to replace D'Arcy on the team.
^{b} Leisel Jones won the 100 m breaststroke under the qualifying time, but declined her spot on the team.

== See also ==
- 2009 in swimming
