= 2014 Pan Pacific Swimming Championships – Men's 200 metre freestyle =

Men's 200 metre freestyle at the 2014 Pan Pacific Swimming Championships
- Venue: Gold Coast Aquatic Centre
- Dates: August 21, 2014 (heats & finals)
- Competitors: 32
- Winning time: 1:45.98

Medalists
gold medal	Thomas Fraser-Holmes	Australia
silver medal	Kosuke Hagino	Japan
bronze medal	Cameron McEvoy	Australia

The men's 200 metre freestyle competition at the 2014 Pan Pacific Swimming Championships took place on August 21 at the Gold Coast Aquatic Centre. The last champion was Ryan Lochte of US.

This race consisted of four lengths of the pool, all in freestyle.

== Records ==
Prior to this competition, the existing world and Pan Pacific records were as follows:

World record	Paul Biedermann (GER)	1:42.00	Rome, Italy	July 28, 2009
Pan Pacific Championships record	Ian Thorpe (AUS)	1:44.75	Yokohama, Japan	August 24, 2002

== Results ==
All times are in minutes and seconds.

KEY:	q	Fastest non-qualifiers	Q	Qualified	CR	Championships record	NR	National record	PB	Personal best	SB	Seasonal best

=== Heats ===
The first round was held on August 21, at 10:45.

Rank	Name	Nationality	Time	Notes
1	Kosuke Hagino	Japan	1:46.60	QA
2	Conor Dwyer	United States	1:46.65	QA
3	Thomas Fraser-Holmes	Australia	1:46.95	QA
4	Cameron McEvoy	Australia	1:47.08	QA
5	Ryan Lochte	United States	1:47.35	QA
6	David McKeon	Australia	1:47.45	QA
7	Reo Sakata	Japan	1:47.74	QA
8	Matt McLean	United States	1:47.91	QA
8	Yuri Kobori	Japan	1:47.91	QA
8	Nicolas Oliveira	Brazil	1:47.91	QA
11	Reed Malone	United States	1:47.95	QB
12	Matthew Stanley	New Zealand	1:48.74	QB
13	João de Lucca	Brazil	1:48.94	QB
14	Ned McKendry	Australia	1:48.97	QB
15	Steven Kent	New Zealand	1:49.00	QB
16	Michael Weiss	United States	1:49.59	QB
17	Travis Mahoney	Australia	1:49.77	
18	Dylan Dunlop-Barrett	New Zealand	1:50.01	
19	Mitchell Donaldson	New Zealand	1:50.37	
20	Takeshi Matsuda	Japan	1:50.41	
21	Ewan Jackson	New Zealand	1:51.39	
22	Tim Phillips	United States	1:51.80	
22	Coleman Allen	Canada	1:51.80	
24	Ma Tianchi	China	1:52.37	
25	Jiang Yuhui	China	1:53.32	
26	David Wong	Hong Kong	1:54.03	
27	Kent Cheung	Hong Kong	1:54.48	
28	Qiu Zi'ao	China	1:54.76	
29	Chun Nam Ng	Hong Kong	1:55.42	
30	Kei Koi Kong	Hong Kong	1:55.65	
31	Kinve Nicholls	Fiji	2:19.81	
32	Takayaw Tevita	Fiji	2:31.38	

=== B Final ===
The B final was held on August 21, at 19:51.

Rank	Name	Nationality	Time	Notes
9	Matt McLean	United States	1:47.16	
10	David McKeon	Australia	1:47.48	
11	Yuri Kobori	Japan	1:47.98	
11	João de Lucca	Brazil	1:47.98	
13	Dylan Dunlop-Barrett	New Zealand	1:49.30	
14	Steven Kent	New Zealand	1:49.71	
15	Coleman Allen	Canada	1:51.30	
16	Ma Tianchi	China	1:56.27	

=== A Final ===
The A final was held on August 21, at 19:51.

Rank	Name	Nationality	Time	Notes
1st place, gold medalist(s)	Thomas Fraser-Holmes	Australia	1:45.98	
2nd place, silver medalist(s)	Kosuke Hagino	Japan	1:46.08	
3rd place, bronze medalist(s)	Cameron McEvoy	Australia	1:46.36	
4	Conor Dwyer	United States	1:46.45	
5	Ryan Lochte	United States	1:46.75	
6	Nicolas Oliveira	Brazil	1:46.98	
7	Matthew Stanley	New Zealand	1:47.33	
8	Reo Sakata	Japan	1:47.76	
