= 2010 Pan Pacific Swimming Championships – Men's 200 metre backstroke =

Men's 200 metre backstroke at the 2010 Pan Pacific Swimming Championships
- Venue: William Woollett Jr. Aquatics Center
- Dates: August 20, 2010 (heats & finals)
- Competitors: 21 from 8 nations
- Winning time: 1:54.12

Medalists
| gold medal | Ryan Lochte | United States |
| silver medal | Tyler Clary | United States |
| bronze medal | Ryosuke Irie | Japan |

The men's 200 metre backstroke competition at the 2010 Pan Pacific Swimming Championships took place on August 20 at the William Woollett Jr. Aquatics Center. The last champion was Aaron Peirsol of US.

This race consisted of four lengths of the pool, all in backstroke.

== Records ==
Prior to this competition, the existing world and Pan Pacific records were as follows:

| World record | Aaron Peirsol (USA) | 1:51.92 | Rome, Italy | July 31, 2009 |
| Pan Pacific Championships record | Aaron Peirsol (USA) | 1:54.44 | Victoria, Canada | August 19, 2006 |

== Results ==
All times are in minutes and seconds.

| KEY: | q | Fastest non-qualifiers | Q | Qualified | CR | Championships record | NR | National record | PB | Personal best | SB | Seasonal best |

=== Heats ===
The first round was held on August 20, at 11:31.

| Rank | Heat | Lane | Name | Nationality | Time | Notes |
|---|---|---|---|---|---|---|
| 1 | 2 | 4 | Ryan Lochte | United States | 1:55.26 | QA |
| 2 | 2 | 5 | Tyler Clary | United States | 1:55.56 | QA |
| 3 | 3 | 5 | Aaron Peirsol | United States | 1:56.22 | QA |
| 4 | 3 | 4 | Ryosuke Irie | Japan | 1:56.65 | QA |
| 5 | 3 | 3 | Ashley Delaney | Australia | 1:58.12 | QA |
| 6 | 1 | 6 | Gareth Kean | New Zealand | 1:58.62 | QA |
| 7 | 1 | 4 | George Du Rand | South Africa | 1:58.69 | QA |
| 8 | 1 | 5 | Nick Thoman | United States | 1:59.16 | QA |
| 9 | 1 | 2 | Tobias Oriwol | Canada | 1:59.56 | QB |
| 10 | 3 | 7 | Charles Francis | Canada | 1:59.63 | QB |
| 11 | 1 | 3 | Kuninori Tada | Japan | 1:59.93 | QB |
| 12 | 3 | 6 | Leonardo de Deus | Brazil | 2:00.47 | QB |
| 13 | 1 | 1 | Masafumi Yamaguchi | Japan | 2:00.62 | QB |
| 14 | 3 | 1 | Matthew Swanston | Canada | 2:00.83 | QB |
| 15 | 3 | 2 | Matt Hawes | Canada | 2:01.09 | QB |
| 16 | 2 | 6 | Daniel Bell | New Zealand | 2:01.69 | QB |
| 17 | 2 | 7 | André Schultz | Brazil | 2:02.61 | |
| 18 | 1 | 7 | Nicholas Sinclair | Canada | 2:02.63 | |
| 19 | 2 | 2 | Park Seon-Kwan | South Korea | 2:04.96 | |
| 20 | 2 | 3 | Hayden Stoeckel | Australia | 2:05.74 | |
| 21 | 2 | 1 | Leonardo Fim | Brazil | 2:06.83 | |

=== B Final ===
The B final was held on August 20, at 19:25.

| Rank | Lane | Name | Nationality | Time | Notes |
|---|---|---|---|---|---|
| 9 | 4 | Aaron Peirsol | United States | 1:56.67 | |
| 10 | 5 | Kuninori Tada | Japan | 1:59.03 | |
| 11 | 3 | Leonardo de Deus | Brazil | 2:01.36 | |
| 12 | 2 | Matthew Swanston | Canada | 2:01.45 | |
| 13 | 8 | Park Seon-Kwan | South Korea | 2:01.90 | |
| 14 | 1 | André Schultz | Brazil | 2:03.58 | |
| 15 | 7 | Daniel Bell | New Zealand | 2:03.72 | |
| 16 | 6 | Masafumi Yamaguchi | Japan | 2:03.90 | |

=== A Final ===
The A final was held on August 20, at 19:25.

| Rank | Lane | Name | Nationality | Time | Notes |
|---|---|---|---|---|---|
| 1st place, gold medalist(s) | 4 | Ryan Lochte | United States | 1:54.12 | CR |
| 2nd place, silver medalist(s) | 5 | Tyler Clary | United States | 1:54.90 | |
| 3rd place, bronze medalist(s) | 3 | Ryosuke Irie | Japan | 1:55.21 | |
| 4 | 6 | Ashley Delaney | Australia | 1:57.78 | |
| 5 | 2 | Gareth Kean | New Zealand | 1:58.55 | |
| 6 | 7 | George Du Rand | South Africa | 1:59.66 | |
| 7 | 8 | Charles Francis | Canada | 2:00.37 | |
| 8 | 1 | Tobias Oriwol | Canada | 2:00.79 | |
