= Nick D'Arcy =

Australian swimmer

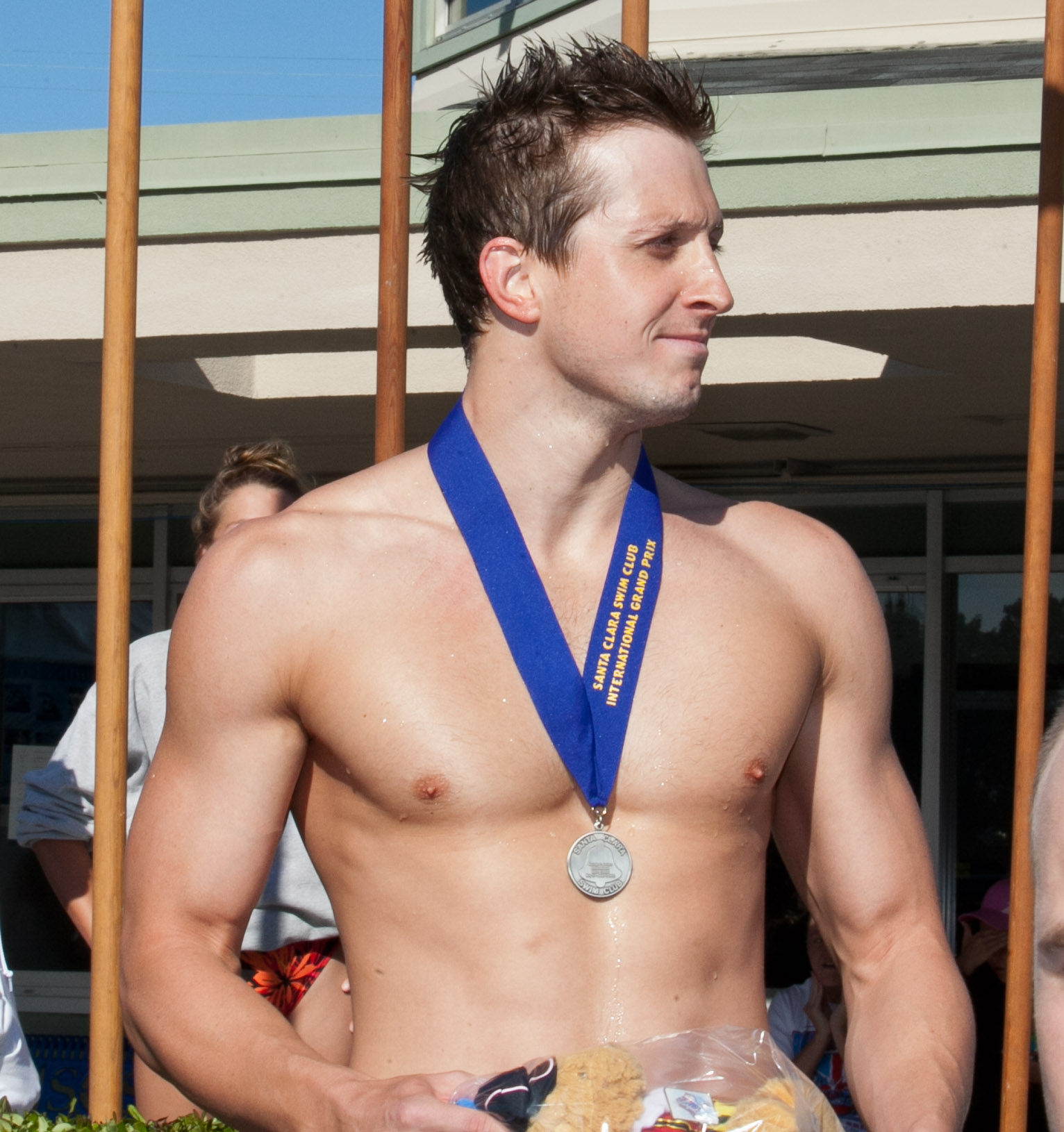

Personal information
- Full name: Nicholas James D'Arcy
- Nickname: "Nick"
- National team: Australia
- Born: 23 July 1987 (age 39) Brisbane, Queensland
- Height: 1.82 m (6 ft 0 in)
- Weight: 79 kg (174 lb)

Sport
- Sport: Swimming
- Strokes: Butterfly
Medal record
Men's swimming
Representing Australia
Pan Pacific Championships
Silver medal – second place	2010 Irvine	200 m butterfly

Nicholas James D'Arcy (born 23 July 1987) is a retired Australian swimmer. He formerly held the Australian record in the 200 m butterfly. He was removed from Australia's 2008 Olympic team due to a violent altercation that happened shortly after the Australian Championships. He was also removed from Australia's team for the 2009 World Championships after being convicted for the same incident. He was raised in Queensland on the Sunshine Coast but currently lives in Brisbane.

== Career ==
At the 2007 World Aquatics Championships in Melbourne, D'Arcy competed in the 200 m butterfly, where he came 14th in the heats in a time of 1:57.88, scraping into the semifinals by 0.09 s. He improved his time to 1:57.15 to finish 12th, missing the final by 0.68 seconds.

The 2008 Australian Swimming Championships held in March in Sydney, were used to select the Australian swimming team for the Beijing Olympics. D'Arcy broke the Australian record for the 200 m butterfly in the semifinals, before setting a new Commonwealth record of 1:55.10 in the final. The victory earned D'Arcy selection for the Olympics and was the tenth fastest time ever recorded in the event.

The 2009 Australian Swimming Championships held in March in Sydney, which are used to select the Australian swimming team for the 2009 World Championships, D'Arcy broke his own Australian Record in the 200 m butterfly in the final, winning in 1:54.46. It stood until 2025.

In March 2010, he qualified for Australia's teams to the 2010 Commonwealth Games and Pan Pacific Championships. He came second at the Pan Pacific Championships behind Michael Phelps.

Prior to competing at the 2010 Commonwealth Games, an out of competition drug test revealed the presence of formoterol. Although there were initial concerns, the drug was permitted as an asthma medication under special exemptions, and it was later revealed that the problem was the result of a mistake in processing paperwork for his exemption. The exemption was provided and backdated, and D'Arcy was permitted to compete in the games. At the Commonwealth Games, D'Arcy was expected to take home the gold medal in the 200 m butterfly as his fastest time for the year was more than two seconds faster than any of the other entrants, but he failed to qualify for the final after a slow heat.

On 20 June 2011, D'Arcy won the 200m Butterfly at the Santa Clara International Grand Prix, beating 14-time Olympic gold medallist Michael Phelps in a time of 1 m 55.39 s. D’Arcy trailed Phelps for practically the entire race before pipping him at the final touch.

D'arcy won Gold in the 200-metre butterfly with a time of 1 m 54.71 s at the 2012 Australian Swimming Championships in Adelaide. At the conclusion of the championships on 22 March, D'arcy was named as a member of the Australian swimming team for the London Olympics. at the London 2012 Olympics Nick D'Arcy was eliminated in the semi-finals.

In October 2013, D'Arcy announced his retirement from swimming.

== Controversies ==
On 31 March 2008, D'Arcy was charged with assault after a brawl with former Commonwealth Games triple gold medalist Simon Cowley on the night D'Arcy was named to the Australian Olympic team. He was later charged with inflicting grievous bodily harm. On 3 April 2008, a second athlete, Tim Peach, came forward claiming he was also assaulted by D'Arcy. D'Arcy was granted conditional bail to appear in court on 21 April 2008. He pleaded guilty to one charge of recklessly inflicting grievous bodily harm, the victim suffered fractures to his jaw, eye socket, hard palate, cheek bone and nose.

On 18 April, the Australian Olympic Committee (AOC) dropped D'Arcy from its 2008 Olympic team, claiming that the swimmer had brought the team into disrepute. D'Arcy subsequently appealed to the Court of Arbitration for Sport (CAS), which confirmed the AOC's decision. However, CAS also found that the decision to expel D'Arcy should not have been made solely by the President of the AOC John Coates, but instead by the entire AOC Board. The AOC Board subsequently unanimously decided to withdraw D'Arcy's membership from the team on 11 June 2008.

D'Arcy appealed the AOC Board's decision to CAS, which rejected this appeal on 16 June 2008.

In March 2009, D'Arcy received a jail sentence of 14 months and 12 days, suspended on condition of good behavior. On 6 April 2009, he was dropped from Australia's team to the 2009 World Championships by Swimming Australia.

Former Australian swimming captain Grant Hackett supported D'Arcy's return to swimming once his ban was served.

On 27 June 2011 Cowley commenced proceedings in the NSW District Court to sue D'Arcy for damages arising from the altercation with D'Arcy.

In December 2011, after Cowley had been awarded $180,000 in damages, D'Arcy declared himself bankrupt, bringing his representation of Australia at the London Olympics in 2012 in jeopardy.

In June 2012 D'Arcy and another swimmer Kenrick Monk posed with guns at a USA gunshop, then Monk posted these photos on his Facebook page. The controversy that followed in Australia was another incident that distracted attention from D'Arcy's swimming achievements and his preparation for the London Olympics. The two swimmers were told by the Australian Olympic Committee they would have to head back to Australia after their Olympic events "for bringing the sport into disrepute". It has been reported that senior members of the Australian swimming team consider this a precautionary measure designed to prevent any further potential for controversy from these two swimmers at the Olympics.
