= Swimming at the 2014 Commonwealth Games – Men's 400 metre individual medley =

Men's 400 metre individual medley at the 2014 Commonwealth Games
- Venue: Tollcross International Swimming Centre
- Dates: 25 July 2014
- Competitors: 14 from 7 nations
- Winning time: 4:11.20

Medalists
gold medal	Dan Wallace	Scotland
silver medal	Thomas Fraser-Holmes	Australia
bronze medal	Sebastien Rousseau	South Africa

The men's 400 metre individual medley event at the 2014 Commonwealth Games as part of the swimming programme took place on 25 July at the Tollcross International Swimming Centre in Glasgow, Scotland.

The medals were presented by Bruce Robertson, vice-president of the Commonwealth Games Federation and the quaichs were presented by Nicola Sturgeon, Deputy First Minister of Scotland.

== Records ==
Prior to this competition, the existing world and Commonwealth Games records were as follows.

World record	Michael Phelps (USA)	4:03.84	Beijing, China	10 August 2008
Commonwealth record	Thomas Fraser-Holmes (AUS)	4:10.14	Adelaide, Australia	26 April 2013
Games record	Chad le Clos (RSA)	4:13.25	Delhi, India	4 October 2010

The following records were established during the competition:

Date	Event	Name	Nationality	Time	Record
25 July	Heat	Dan Wallace	Scotland	4:11.04	GR

== Results ==
=== Heats ===
Rank	Heat	Lane	Name	Nationality	Time	Notes
1	1	5	Dan Wallace	Scotland	4:11.04	Q, GR
2	2	2	Travis Mahoney	Australia	4:14.99	Q
3	2	5	Roberto Pavoni	England	4:15.26	Q
4	2	4	Thomas Fraser-Holmes	Australia	4:15.34	Q
5	2	3	Lewis Smith	Scotland	4:15.64	Q
6	1	4	Sebastien Rousseau	South Africa	4:16.02	Q
7	1	3	Luke Reilly	Canada	4:18.49	Q
8	2	7	Ross Muir	Scotland	4:19.22	Q
9	1	6	Thomas Haffield	Wales	4:19.23	
10	1	2	Jared Gilliland	Australia	4:21.78	
11	1	7	Will Brothers	Canada	4:22.61	
12	2	6	Max Litchfield	England	4:25.08	
13	1	1	Dominic Walter	Jamaica	4:43.86	
	2	1	Xavier Mohammed	Wales		DNS

=== Final ===
Rank	Lane	Name	Nationality	Time	Notes
1st place, gold medalist(s)	4	Dan Wallace	Scotland	4:11.20	
2nd place, silver medalist(s)	6	Thomas Fraser-Holmes	Australia	4:12.04	
3rd place, bronze medalist(s)	7	Sebastien Rousseau	South Africa	4:13.09	
4	3	Roberto Pavoni	England	4:14.42	
5	2	Lewis Smith	Scotland	4:16.17	
6	5	Travis Mahoney	Australia	4:18.51	
7	1	Luke Reilly	Canada	4:19.72	
8	8	Ross Muir	Scotland	4:21.50	
