= Tyler Clary =

American swimmer (born 1989)

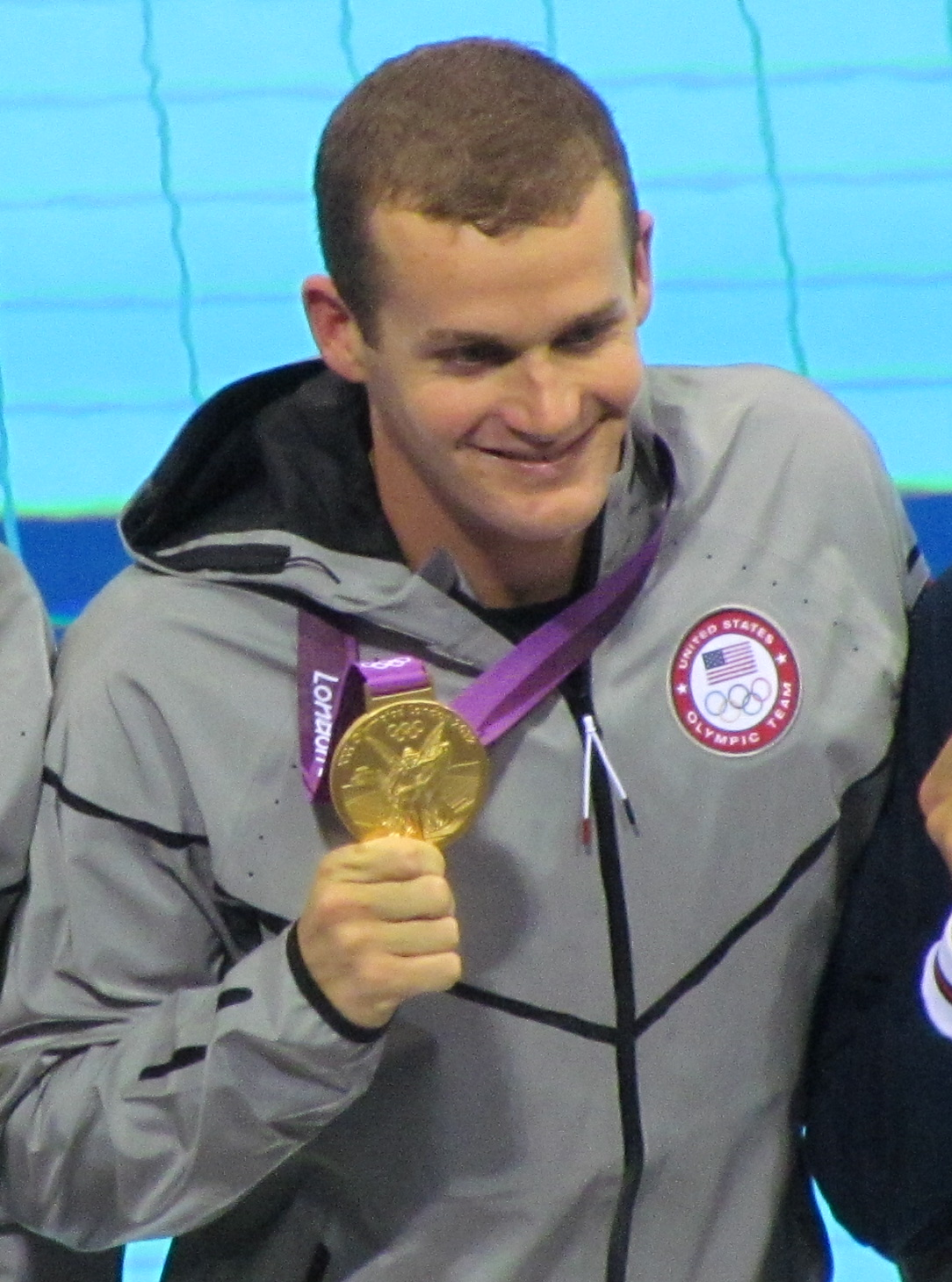
- Tyler Clary at the 2012 Summer Olympics

Personal information
- Full name: Scott Tyler Clary
- National team: United States
- Born: Scott Tyler Flowers; March 12, 1989 (age 37) Redlands, California, U.S.
- Height: 6 ft 1 in (185 cm)
- Weight: 185 lb (84 kg)

Sport
- Sport: Swimming
- Strokes: Backstroke, butterfly, individual medley
- Club: FAST Swim Team Of Fullerton
- College team: University of Michigan
Medal record
Men's swimming
Representing United States
Event	1st	2nd	3rd
Olympic Games	1	0	0
World Championships (LC)	0	2	2
World Championships (SC)	1	1	2
Pan Pacific Championships	1	4	1
2007 Rio	0	1	0
'Total	3	8	5
Olympic Games
Gold medal – first place	2012 London	200 m backstroke
World Championships (LC)
Silver medal – second place	2009 Rome	400 m medley
Silver medal – second place	2011 Shanghai	400 m medley
Bronze medal – third place	2011 Shanghai	200 m backstroke
Bronze medal – third place	2013 Barcelona	200 m backstroke
World Championships (SC)
Gold medal – first place	2014 Doha	4×200 m freestyle
Silver medal – second place	2010 Dubai	200 m backstroke
Bronze medal – third place	2010 Dubai	200 m medley
Bronze medal – third place	2010 Dubai	400 m medley
Pan Pacific Championships
Gold medal – first place	2014 Gold Coast	200 m backstroke
Silver medal – second place	2010 Irvine	200 m backstroke
Silver medal – second place	2010 Irvine	200 m medley
Silver medal – second place	2010 Irvine	400 m medley
Silver medal – second place	2014 Gold Coast	400 m medley
Bronze medal – third place	2014 Gold Coast	200 m butterfly
Pan American Games
Silver medal – second place	2007 Rio	200 m backstroke

Scott Tyler Clary (born March 12, 1989) is an American former competition swimmer and Olympic gold medalist. In his Olympic debut at the 2012 Summer Olympics, Clary won gold in the 200-meter backstroke in Olympic record time. In total, he won sixteen medals in major international competitions: three gold, eight silver, and five bronze spanning the Summer Olympics, the FINA World Championships, the Pan Pacific Championships, and the Pan American Games.

== Swimming career ==
=== Early years ===
Clary began swimming at the age of 8 during a water safety class. Prior to a legal name change, Clary competed at the 2006 Youth Worlds as Scott Flowers, where he won four medals and was named the top male performer of the meet. He attended Riverside Polytechnic High School in Riverside, California, graduating in 2007, and swam competitively for Fullerton Aquatics (FAST Swimming) in Fullerton, California.

At the 2007 Pan American Games, Clary won the silver in the 200-meter backstroke, finishing behind Brazilian swimmer Thiago Pereira. At the 2008 U.S. Olympic Team Trials, Clary placed third in the 200-meter backstroke and fourth in the 400-meter individual medley.

Clary accepted an athletic scholarship to attend the University of Michigan, where he competed in National Collegiate Athletic Association (NCAA) competition for three years. He was a three-time NCAA national champion, winning the 400-yard individual medley in 2009 and 2010 and the 200-yard backstroke in 2009. Clary was the 2009 NCAA Swimmer of the Year and received eleven All-American honors.

Clary turned professional in 2010, forgoing his final season at Michigan. In preparation for the 2012 Summer Olympics, Clary spent the next two years training under Jon Urbanchek at the U.S. Olympic Post-Graduate Training Center at Fullerton Aquatics (FAST Swimming).

=== 2009 ===
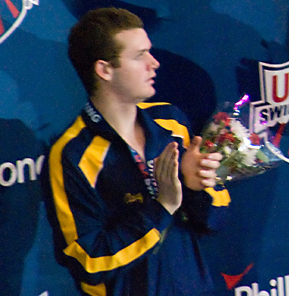
Clary in 2009

On March 27, 2009, Clary broke Michael Phelps' American record in the 400-yard individual medley. One day later, he broke Ryan Lochte's NCAA record in the 200-yard backstroke.

At the 2009 National Championships, Clary placed second in both the 200-meter butterfly (1:53.64) and 400-meter individual medley (4:06.96), qualifying to swim both events at the 2009 World Aquatics Championships in Rome. Clary also placed third in both the 200-meter backstroke (1:54.53) and 200-meter individual medley (1:57.25).

At the 2009 World Aquatics Championships, Clary placed second to Ryan Lochte in the 400-meter individual medley final with a time of 4:07.31. Clary also placed fifth in the 200-meter butterfly final with a time of 1:54.45. For his performance, Clary was awarded the breakout performer of the year award at the 2009 Golden Goggle Awards.

=== 2010 ===
At the 2010 National Championships, Clary finished second to Lochte in the 400-meter individual medley, and third in the 200-meter butterfly, 200-meter individual medley and 200-meter backstroke.

At the 2010 Pan Pacific Swimming Championships, Clary won three silver medals, all behind Lochte. In the 400-meter individual medley, Clary recorded a time of 4:09.55, behind Lochte's 4:07.59. In the 200-meter backstroke, Clary finished second in a time of 1:54.90. In the 200-meter individual medley, Clary had a strong comeback to overtake Thiago Pereira for the second position, and finished with a time of 1:57.61. Clary also placed seventh in the 200-meter butterfly. By posting the second-best American performances from either Nationals or Pan Pacs in the 400-meter individual medley, 200-meter backstroke and 200-meter butterfly, Clary has qualified to compete in those events at the 2011 World Aquatics Championships.

At the end of 2010, Clary competed at the 2010 World Short Course Championships in Dubai, where he won silver in the 200-meter backstroke and bronze in the 200 and 400-meter individual medley.

=== 2011 World Championships ===
At the 2011 World Aquatics Championships in Shanghai, Clary competed in three events and won two medals, a silver and a bronze. In his first event, the 200-meter butterfly, Clary did not advance past the semifinals, posting a time of 1:56.01 and finishing ninth overall. In the 200-meter backstroke, Clary finished in third place behind Ryan Lochte and Ryosuke Irie with a time of 1:54.69. At the 150-meter mark, Clary was in second place behind Lochte but Irie was able to overtake him for the silver medal. After the race, Clary said, "I won the bronze medal, but that's not what I had expected ... I feel a bit disappointed." In his last event, the 400-meter individual medley, Clary finished second to Lochte with a time of 4:11.17, defending his silver medal from 2009. After the race, Clary said, "This is my second world championships ... Technically, I'm a better swimmer and am more confident. I'll be working on being ready for next summer."

=== 2012 Summer Olympics ===
At the 2012 United States Olympic Trials in Omaha, Nebraska, the qualifying meet for the Olympics, Clary made the Olympic team for the first time by finishing second behind Michael Phelps in the 200-meter butterfly with a time of 1:55.12. Later, he also qualified for the 200-meter backstroke by posting a time of 1:54.88, finishing second behind Ryan Lochte. In his first event, the 400-meter individual medley, Clary missed out on a spot on the team by finishing third behind Phelps and Lochte.

In his first event at the 2012 Summer Olympics in London, the 200-meter butterfly, Clary placed fifth in the final with a time of 1:55.06, which was slower than the times he posted in the heats (1:54.96) and semifinals (1:54.93). The final was won by Chad le Clos in a time of 1:52.96. In his second and last event of the Olympics, the 200-meter backstroke, Clary won in a time of 1:53.41, bettering Ryan Lochte's Olympic record of 1:53.94. Prior to this race, Clary held a personal best of 1:54.53 set in 2009. Going into the final, Clary posted the top times in the heats (1:56.24) and semifinals (1:54.71), but was not considered the favorite as Lochte was the defending Olympic and world champion. In the final of the 200-meter backstroke, Lochte lead Clary throughout the race and at the 150-meter mark, Clary was 0.12 seconds behind Lochte. During the last 50-meters however, Clary powered home with a split of 28.48, overtaking Lochte and winning gold. For Clary, it was also the first major international gold he won in his career.

=== 2013 World Championships ===
In his first event at the 2013 World Aquatics Championships in Barcelona, Clary competed in the 200-meter butterfly and placed 7th in the final with a time of 1:56.34. Clary won his first medal of the competition, a bronze, in the 200-meter backstroke, recording a time of 1:54.64 in the final and repeating his result in the event from 2011. In his third and last event, the 400-meter individual medley, Clary was just off the podium with a fourth-place finish, finishing with a time of 4:10.39.

=== 2014 Pan Pacific Championships ===
Clary qualified for the 2014 Pan Pacific Championships at the 2014 AT&T US Nationals. At the Pan Pacific Swimming Championships he took gold in the 200 meter backstroke, silver in the 400 meter individual medley, and bronze in the 200 meter butterfly at the 2014 Pan Pacific Swimming Championships.

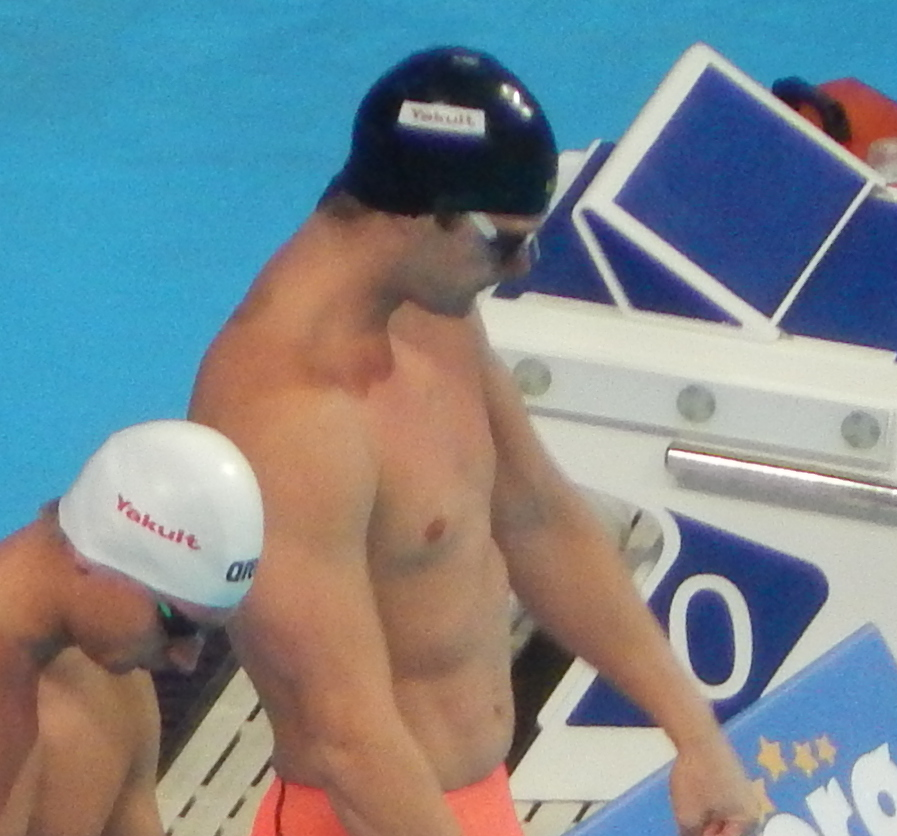
Clary before the 200 meter backstroke finals at the 2015 World Aquatics Championships

=== 2015 World Championships ===
Clary failed to medal at the 2015 World Championships. He placed fourth in the 400 meter individual medley, seventh in the 200 meter backstroke, and twelfth in the 200 meter butterfly at the 2015 World Aquatics Championships.

=== 2016 Olympic Trials ===
Clary retired from swimming after failing to qualify for the 2016 Summer Olympics. He placed third in the 200 meter backstroke, behind Ryan Murphy and Jacob Pebley. Clary commented on his retirement, "I'm looking forward to turning a page in the book of my life and starting a new chapter, I'm going to get to do a lot of things that I've been wanting to do for years now."

== Personal life ==
Prior to a legal name change in late 2006/early 2007, in competition Clary went by his legal name of Scott Flowers, which he used for the majority of his junior career, despite using Clary as his last name in his personal and academic life. He said that he changed his name when he was 18 to honor his stepfather, Lonnie Clary who has "always been there for me".

A motorsports enthusiast, Clary hopes to race cars professionally when his swimming career is over. Clary stated he intends to switch to NASCAR after the 2016 Summer Olympics, with the goal of joining the Monster Energy NASCAR Cup Series in 2021.

In January 2017 Clary announced he would be joining the swimming team coaching staff for the Hotchkiss School.

== Personal bests ==
As of August 2, 2012.

Long course
Event	Time	Meet	Date
200 m backstroke	1:53.41	2012 Summer Olympics	August 2, 2012
200 m butterfly	1:53.64	2009 National Championships	July 8, 2009
200 m individual medley	1:57.25	2009 National Championships	July 10, 2009
400 m individual medley	4:06.96	2009 National Championships	July 7, 2009

Short course
Event	Time	Meet	Date
200 m backstroke	1:49.09	2010 Short Course Worlds	December 19, 2010
200 m butterfly	1:53.86	2009 Duel in the Pool	December 19, 2009
100 m individual medley	53.94	2010 Short Course Worlds	December 18, 2010
200 m individual medley	1:53.56	2010 Short Course Worlds	December 17, 2010
400 m individual medley	3:57.56	2010 Short Course Worlds	December 16, 2010

== See also ==
- List of Olympic medalists in swimming (men)
- List of University of Michigan alumni
- List of World Aquatics Championships medalists in swimming (men)

Awards
Preceded by Ryan Lochte	American Swimmer of the Year; 2014 (with Ryan Cochrane)	Succeeded by Michael Phelps
