= Luke Reilly =

Canadian swimmer

Personal information
- Full name: Luke Patrick Reilly
- National team: Canada
- Born: November 23, 1995 (age 30) Dallas, Texas, U.S.
- Height: 190.5 cm (6 ft 3 in)

Sport
- Sport: Swimming
- Strokes: Medley
- Coach: Jozsef Nagy
Medal record
Men's swimming
Representing Canada
Pan American Games
Silver medal – second place	2015 Toronto	400 m medley
Bronze medal – third place	2015 Toronto	4×100 m medley

Luke Patrick Reilly (born November 23, 1995) is an American-born Canadian medley swimmer. He is an international medalist and a multiple time national champion in multiple events. He was born in Dallas, Texas, and raised in Richmond, British Columbia. He trains with the Vancouver National Swim Centre.

In 2015, Luke competed at the Pan Am Games in Toronto. He won a silver medal in the 400 meter individual medley.

In 2016 Luke was left off of the Rio Olympic team. Although he missed the Swimming Canada imposed cut by 0.03, he met the Olympic requirements and won the 400 m by 4 seconds. He also won the 200IM. In the winter of 2015, Luke designed a line of loungewear. However, after missing the Rio Olympics, the line was discontinued.

Despite having a back injury, Luke competed in the 29th Summer Universiade in Taipei City in August 2017, where he took part in both the 400 m individual medley and 200 m individual medley, being eliminated in the heats with a time of 4:24.51 and the semifinals with a time of 2:03.44 respectively.

He competed at the 2014 Commonwealth Games and finished seventh in the 400 m individual medley and eighth in the same event at the 2014 Pan Pacific Swimming Championships.
