= Travis Mahoney =

Australian swimmer (born 1990)

Personal information
- Full name: Travis Mahoney
- National team: Australia
- Born: 24 July 1990 (age 36) Box Hill, Victoria
- Height: 191 cm (6 ft 3 in)
- Weight: 82 kg (181 lb)

Sport
- Sport: Swimming
- Strokes: Medley
- Club: Marion
- Coach: Peter ‘Bush’ Bishop
Medal record
Men's swimming
Representing Australia
World Championships (SC)
Silver medal – second place	2012 Istanbul	4×200 m freestyle relay
Bronze medal – third place	2012 Istanbul	4×100 m freestyle relay
Universiade
Silver medal – second place	2015 Gwangju	4×200 m freestyle relay

Travis Mahoney (born 24 July 1990) is an Australian medley and backstroke swimmer. Winner of two relay medals at the 2012 World Short Course Championships, he is also part of the quartet that broke the world record in the short course mixed 4 × 50 metres freestyle relay. In 2016, he qualified for his first Olympic Games.

== Career ==
A late bloomer who struggled during his junior career, Mahoney first represented Australia at the 2012 World Cup winning three medals at the age of 22. In Beijing, he won silver in 400 metre individual medley and in Singapore, Mahoney won silver in the 400 metre individual medley and bronze in the 200 metre backstroke.

The following month at the 2012 World Short Course Championships in Istanbul, he won two medals in relay events. Alongside Tommaso D'Orsogna, Kyle Richardson and Kenneth To, they won the bronze in the 4 × 100 metre freestyle relay in 3:07.27. In the 4 × 200 metre freestyle relay event, Mahoney swam the third leg of the heats to qualify third fastest. In the final, Mahoney was replaced by Richardson and with D'Orsogna, Jarrod Killey and Robert Hurley won silver in a new Oceanian record time of 6:52.29. In his individual swims, Mahoney finished 7th in the 200 metre backstroke and narrowly missed the final in both the 400 and the 200 metre individual medley events finishing 9th and 10th respectively.

At the 2013 Australian Swimming Championships, Mahoney won silver in the 400 metre individual medley in 4:18.09, just missing the qualifying time for the 2013 World Championships by 1.61 seconds.

In December he swam in five legs of the 2013 World Cup. In Dubai, Mahoney won bronze in both the 200 metre backstroke and the 400 metre individual medley. In Singapore, the foursome of Mahoney, Regan Leong, Brittany Elmslie and Emma McKeon won silver in the mixed 4 × 50 metre freestyle relay. At the penultimate leg in Tokyo in the heats of the mixed 4 × 50 metre freestyle relay D'Orsogna, Leong, the Campbell sisters Bronte and Cate set a new world record time of 1:31.13. In the final, Mahoney replaced Leong as the second leg swimmer and together they won gold and set another world record, dropping to the time to 1:29.61. The final leg in Beijing saw the same foursome win gold in the event again but narrowly missing the world record posting a time of 1:30.52. Mahoney also picked another individual medal with bronze in the 400 metre individual medley to cap off his world cup campaign.

At the 2014 Australian Swimming Championships, he again won silver in the 400 metre individual medley in a personal best time of 4:17.39, bettering the B standard time and qualified for the Commonwealth Games. At the Glasgow Commonwealth Games in July, Mahoney swam under 4:15 for the first time in the 400 IM to finish as the second fastest qualifier. In the final, he finished 6th with a time of 4:18.51.

Three weeks later at the 2014 Pan Pacific Swimming Championships in Gold Coast, Australia, Mahoney finished 6th in the 200 metre individual medley, 7th in the 400 metre individual medley, 14th in the 200 metre backstroke and 17th in the 200 metre freestyle.

In December, he represented Australia at his second World Short Course Championships in Doha. On night 1, Mahoney, Matthew Abood, Cameron McEvoy and Tommaso D'Orsogna finished 5th in the 4 × 100 metre freestyle relay. The following morning he placed a disappointing 21st in the 400 metre individual medley in a time of 4:12.21. Illness stuck Mahoney and as a result withdrew from his remaining events – the 100 and 200 metre individual medley and the 200 metre backstroke.

In April 2015, at the national titles, Mahoney finished third in the 400 IM to again narrowly miss out on qualifying for the World Championships. In July, he competed at the Summer Universiade in Gwangju, South Korea. On night 1, Mahoney, Jacob Hansford, Jack McLoughlin and Justin James were fifth to touch the wall in the 4 × 100 metre freestyle relay only to be later disqualified when James as the anchor swimmer broke early. Redemption was made by the same foursome in 4 × 200 metre freestyle relay by taking out the silver medal. In the 4 × 100 metre medley relay, the Australian quartet of Mahoney, Nicholas Schafer, Nicholas Brown and Justin James finished fourth with Mahoney swimming the backstroke leg in 54.84. Individually, Mahoney swam 5th in the 200 IM, 6th in the 400 IM and 13th in 100 metre freestyle.

In October, Mahoney competed at his third World Cup. Only attending the Tokyo leg, he finished 5th both the 200 and 400 IM events, 13th in the 200 metre freestyle and 14th in the 100 freestyle.

"“My aunty is without a doubt the biggest inspiration in my life. It’s sad that she didn’t get to see this but I know she’s watching."

— Travis Mahoney, 7 April 2016

In April 2016, at the national championships he finished second in the 400 metres individual medley in a personal best time of 4:14.98 to qualify for his first Olympic Games. An emotional Mahoney stated that his greatest inspiration was his aunt Sally McLean who died in August 2015 after a nine-year battle with cancer at the age of 52. He also lost his grandmother within two months of losing his aunt.

== See also ==
- List of World Swimming Championships (25 m) medalists (men)

Records
Preceded by Tomaso D'Orsogna, Regan Leong, Bronte Campbell, Cate Campbell	Mixed 4 × 50 metres freestyle relay world record-holder 10 November 2013 – 14 December 2013; With: Tomaso D'Orsogna, Cate Campbell, Bronte Campbell	Succeeded by Sergey Fesikov, Vladimir Morozov, Rozaliya Nasretdinova, Veronika Popova
