= 2010 Pan Pacific Swimming Championships – Men's 200 metre butterfly =

Men's 200 metre butterfly at the 2010 Pan Pacific Swimming Championships
- Venue: William Woollett Jr. Aquatics Center
- Dates: August 18, 2010 (heats & finals)
- Competitors: 20 from 9 nations
- Winning time: 1:54.11

Medalists
gold medal	Michael Phelps	United States
silver medal	Nick D'Arcy	Australia
bronze medal	Takeshi Matsuda	Japan

The men's 200 metre butterfly competition at the 2010 Pan Pacific Swimming Championships took place on August 18 at the William Woollett Jr. Aquatics Center. The last champion was Michael Phelps of US. This was the first time in 3 years (since the 2007 World Aquatics Championships) that Phelps failed to beat a championship record in a final of international competition.

This race consisted of four lengths of the pool, all lengths being in butterfly stroke.

== Records ==
Prior to this competition, the existing world and Pan Pacific records were as follows:

World record	Michael Phelps (USA)	1:51.51	Rome, Italy	July 29, 2009
Pan Pacific Championships record	Michael Phelps (USA)	1:53.80	Victoria, Canada	August 17, 2006

== Results ==
All times are in minutes and seconds.

KEY:	q	Fastest non-qualifiers	Q	Qualified	CR	Championships record	NR	National record	PB	Personal best	SB	Seasonal best

=== Heats ===
The first round was held on August 18, at 11:22.

Rank	Heat	Lane	Name	Nationality	Time	Notes
1	2	5	Michael Phelps	United States	1:55.23	QA
2	3	4	Takeshi Matsuda	Japan	1:55.47	QA
3	3	5	Nick D'Arcy	Australia	1:55.63	QA
4	3	7	Tyler Clary	United States	1:55.72	QA
5	1	6	Wu Peng	China	1:56.18	QA
6	2	4	Kaio Almeida	Brazil	1:56.74	QA
7	1	5	Ryusuke Sakata	Japan	1:56.85	QA
8	3	6	Kazuya Kaneda	Japan	1:57.14	QB 3rd Japanese
9	2	1	Stefan Hirniak	Canada	1:57.31	QA
10	1	3	Leonardo de Deus	Brazil	1:57.39	QB
11	2	3	Chris Wright	Australia	1:57.52	QB
12	2	2	Mark Dylla	United States	1:57.83	QB
13	1	7	Yuya Horihata	Japan	1:58.01	QB
14	1	4	Sebastian Rousseau	South Africa	1:58.04	QB
15	2	7	Moss Burmester	New Zealand	1:58.11	QB
16	1	2	Thiago Pereira	Brazil	1:58.27	
17	3	2	Jayden Hadler	Australia	1:58.87	QB
18	3	1	Zack Chetrat	Canada	2:00.66	
19	1	1	Karl Wolk	Canada	2:00.86	
20	3	3	Lucas Salatta	Brazil	2:01.31	
-	2	6	Hsu Chi-Chieh	Chinese Taipei	DNS	

=== B Final ===
The B final was held on August 18, at 19:50.

Rank	Lane	Name	Nationality	Time	Notes
9	5	Leonardo de Deus	Brazil	1:56.86	
10	1	Jayden Hadler	Australia	1:57.65	
11	3	Chris Wright	Australia	1:57.96	
12	4	Kazuya Kaneda	Japan	1:58.12	
13	6	Mark Dylla	United States	1:58.23	
14	2	Sebastian Rousseau	South Africa	1:58.52	
15	7	Moss Burmester	New Zealand	1:58.62	
16	8	Zack Chetrat	Canada	2:00.24	

=== A Final ===
The A final was held on August 18, at 19:50.

Rank	Lane	Name	Nationality	Time	Notes
1st place, gold medalist(s)	4	Michael Phelps	United States	1:54.11	
2nd place, silver medalist(s)	3	Nick D'Arcy	Australia	1:54.73	
3rd place, bronze medalist(s)	5	Takeshi Matsuda	Japan	1:54.81	
4	2	Wu Peng	China	1:55.36	
5	7	Kaio Almeida	Brazil	1:55.66	
6	1	Ryusuke Sakata	Japan	1:56.04	
7	6	Tyler Clary	United States	1:56.83	
8	8	Stefan Hirniak	Canada	1:57.94	
