= Ryan Napoleon =

Australian swimmer

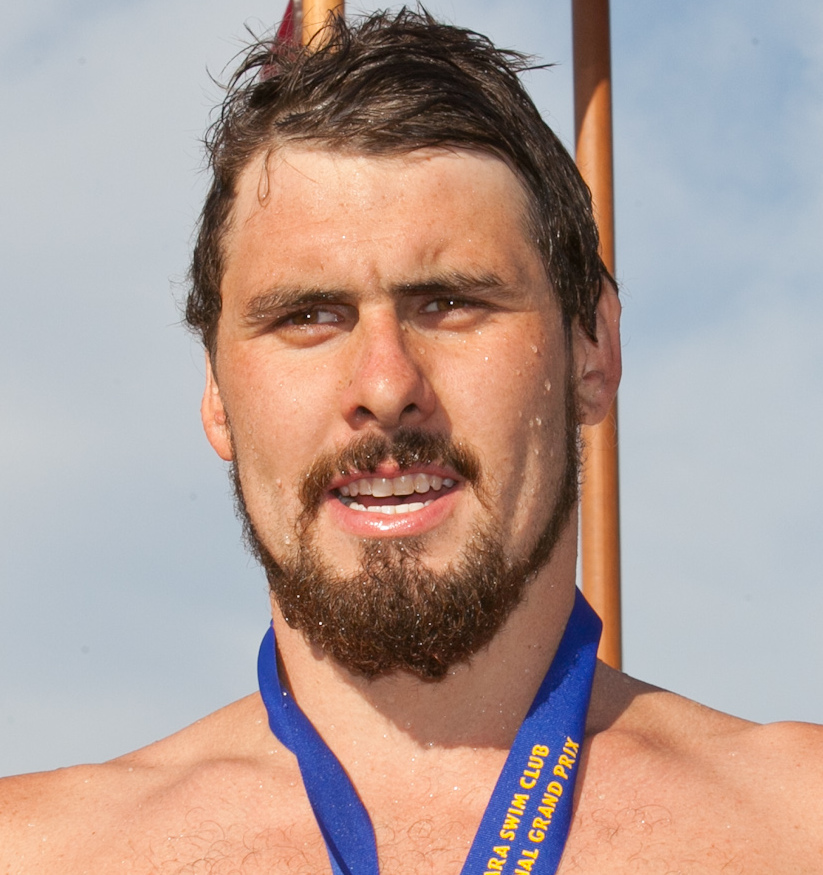

Personal information
- Full name: Ryan Napoleon
- National team: Australia
- Born: 26 May 1990 (age 36) Sydney, Australia
- Height: 1.87 m (6 ft 2 in)
- Weight: 84 kg (185 lb)

Sport
- Sport: Swimming
- Strokes: Freestyle, butterfly
- Club: Palm Beach Currumbin; St Peters Western
- Coach: Richard Scarce
Medal record
Men's swimming
Representing Australia
Commonwealth Games
Gold medal – first place	2010 Delhi	4×200 m freestyle
Silver medal – second place	2010 Delhi	400 m freestyle
Universiade
Gold medal – first place	2013 Kazan	400 m freestyle
Bronze medal – third place	2013 Kazan	4×200 m freestyle

Ryan Napoleon (born 26 May 1990) is an Australian freestyle swimmer and Commonwealth Games medallist.

== Career ==
=== Youth Swimming ===
Napoleon won gold in the 4 × 200 m freestyle relay, silver in the 4 × 100 m medley relay and bronze in the 100m butterfly whilst representing Australia at the Youth Olympic Festival.

At the 2008 Commonwealth Youth Games in Pune, India, Napoleon won gold in the 200m freestyle, 4 × 100 m freestyle, 4 × 200 m freestyle, 4 × 100 m medley relays as well as silver in the 100m freestyle.

During the 2008 Oceania Swimming Championships held in Christchurch, New Zealand, Napoleon won gold in the 4 × 200 m relay and bronze in the 200m butterfly.

Napoleon won the national 1500m title and became the sixth fastest Australian of all time at the 2009 Australian Swimming Championships.

=== 2009 World Championships ===
At the 2009 World Championships, Napoleon placed 11th in the 1500m freestyle, 12th in the 800m freestyle, and 21st in the 400m freestyle.

2009 World Championships events
Event	Time	Place
400m freestyle	3:47.98	21st
800m freestyle	7:53.92	12th
1500m freestyle	15:09.55	11th

=== 2010 Telstra Australian Swimming Championships ===
At the 2010 Australian Championships Napoleon won silver medals in the 400m, 800m and 1500m freestyle events.

=== 2010 Pan Pacific Championships and Commonwealth Games ===
Napoleon placed 9th in the 1500m, and was ranked 6th in the 400m freestyle at the Pan Pacific Swimming Championships.
At the 2010 Commonwealth Games Napoleon won silver in the 400m freestyle in a time of 3.48.59, and gold as part of the 4 × 200 m freestyle relay team.

2010 Commonwealth Games events
Final medal count: 2 (1 gold, 1 silver, 0 bronze)
Event	Time	Place
400 m freestyle	3:48.59	Silver
1500 m freestyle	15:28.70	6th
4 × 200 m freestyle relay	7:10.29	Gold

=== 2011 Trials and Australian Swimming Championships ===
At the 2011 Australian Swimming Championships, he won the 400m freestyle in a time of 3:45.16, making him the 4th fastest Australian 1500m swimmer of all time, behind Olympic Champions Ian Thorpe, Grant Hackett and Kieren Perkins

2011 Australian Swimming Championships events
Final medal count: 3 (2 gold, 0 silver, 1 bronze)
Event	Time	Place
200 m freestyle	1:47.68	Bronze
400 m freestyle	3:45.16	Gold
800 m freestyle relay	7:55.20	Gold

=== 2011 World Championships ===
In what could be described as an unlucky meet for Napoleon, he finished in 13th place for both the men's 400m and 800m freestyle.

=== 2012 Olympic Trials and Australian Swimming Championships ===
Napoleon secured his place in his maiden Olympic team when he earned 2nd place in the men's 400m freestyle at the 2012 Australian Swimming Championships. In both the heat and semi-finals of this event, Napoleon was to race against Australian swimming champion, Ian Thorpe who was making a comeback to swimming via this event. Despite both races receiving a high degree of media attention, Napoleon did not let this unnerve him. He swam impressively in his heat to become the top qualifier and later placed first in his semi-final race. To further cement Napoleon's Olympic dream, he placed 5th in perhaps what is the most competitive of the men's events, the 200m freestyle. This earned him a spot in the men's 4 × 200 m relay team for the 2012 Summer Olympics in London.

2012 Australian Swimming Championships events
Final medal count: 1 (0 gold, 1 silver, 0 bronze)
Event	Time	Place
200 m freestyle	1:47.66	5th
400 m freestyle	3:47.93	Silver

At the Olympics, he finished 8th in the 400m freestyle, and was part of the Australian team that finished 5th in the 4 × 200 m freestyle.

== Doping ban ==
After Napoleon qualified to contest the 400m and 1500m freestyle at the 2010 Commonwealth Games in Delhi, swimming governing body FINA imposed a three-month doping ban on him due to a failed drug test taken in November 2009. Although FINA accepted an innocent mistake was made when Napoleon took incorrectly labelled asthma medication, it was decided that he would be ineligible for three months after the violation with the suspension commencing on 20 August 2010, meaning that he was unable to train with his squad and would be unable to compete in the Games.

Napoleon appealed the decision made by FINA to the Court of Arbitration of Sport (CAS) resulting in the ban being backdated to 15 June 2010. Although he had missed out on vital training and preparation, Napoleon was then eligible to compete in Delhi where he claimed silver in the 400m freestyle and gold in the 4 × 200 m relay.

== See also ==
- List of Commonwealth Games medallists in swimming (men)
