= Charles Francis (swimmer) =

Canadian swimmer (born 1988)

Personal information
- Full name: Charles Francis
- National team: Canada
- Born: August 17, 1988 (age 37) Cowansville, Quebec
- Height: 1.85 m (6 ft 1 in)
- Weight: 77 kg (170 lb)

Sport
- Sport: Swimming
- Strokes: Backstroke
- Club: Piscines du Parc Olympique

Charles Francis (born August 17, 1988) is a Canadian competitor swimmer and backstroker. He was born in the small town of Cowansville, Quebec.

Francis competed at the 2007 Pan American Games, but failed to qualify for the 2008 Summer Olympics. Francis also competed at the 2011 World Aquatics Championships in Shanghai, his best result being a 16th-place finish in the 50-metre backstroke event. In 2012 at the Canadian Olympic trials, Francis qualified to compete in the 100-metre backstroke event at the 2012 Summer Olympics in London. In London, he advanced to the semifinals, finishing 15th overall. He was also part of the Canadian 4 x 100 m medley relay team.
