= Andrew Ford (swimmer) =

Canadian swimmer (born 1989)

Personal information
- Full name: Andrew Ford
- National team: Canada
- Born: June 19, 1989 (age 37) Guelph, Ontario
- Height: 1.86 m (6 ft 1 in)
- Weight: 80 kg (180 lb)

Sport
- Sport: Swimming
- Strokes: Individual medley
- Club: Guelph Marlin AC

Andrew Ford (born June 19, 1989) is a Canadian competition swimmer. He competed in the 200-metre individual medley race at the 2012 Summer Olympics; he placed first in his heat with a time of 2:00.28, but his time of 2:01.58 in the semifinal did not qualify him for the final.
