= Jordan Hartney =

Canadian swimmer

Personal information
- Born: July 26, 1988 (age 37) Vancouver, Canada
- Home town: Richmond, Canada

Sport
- Sport: Swimming
- Strokes: Butterfly, medley

Jordan Davis Hartney (born July 26, 1988 in Vancouver, British Columbia) is a Canadian swimmer who specializes in the individual medley.

== Early life ==
He grew up in Richmond, British Columbia and is the youngest of three siblings. Hartney started swimming at the age of 3 and trained with the Richmond Racers Swim Club until he was 8 years of age. He attended Howard Debeck Elementary School until he was 8 years old and moved to White Rock, British Columbia. There, he attended Ecole Laronde Elementary and then Elgin Park Secondary. Hartney continued swimming in White Rock and joined the Pacific Sea Wolves Swim Club. He stopped swimming halfway through the season when he was 13 years old, but returned the next season because he missed the sport and joined the Richmond Rapids Swim Club.

At the age of 18, Hartney attended the University of British Columbia and swam on the varsity team. He began his second year with the UBC Thunderbirds after having an extremely successful rookie season. In 2008, Hartney was training with Derek Schoof, head of the UBCD and Thunderbirds swim coach. Already considered one of the premier individual medley swimmers in the country, Hartney continued to grow at both the CIS and international level.

== Career ==
At the 2007 CIS Championships he claimed two silver medals in the 200 and 400 IM, behind former world record holder and teammate Brian Johns, placing fifth in the 200 butterfly, and ninth in the 200 backstroke. At the 2008, CIS Championships Hartney won the gold medal in the 400 IM with a time of 4:17.06, silver medal in the 200 IM and 200 butterfly, and bronze in the 200 backstroke.

Hartney was named the National age group champion in the 100 and 200 butterfly, and the 200 and 400 IM at the 2004 Club National championships in Winnipeg. In 2005, he represented Canada at the Australia Youth Festival. Hartney competed at the 2006 Pan Pacific Championships and finished 5th in the 200 IM and 4th in the 400 IM.

In the summer of 2007, Hartney represented Canada at the World University Games in Bangkok. He placed fifth in the 400 IM with personal best time of 4:21.99

== Personal life ==
Hartney uses music, breathing and visualization techniques to help him prepare for a big race.
