= Alexander Tikhonov (swimmer) =

Russian swimmer

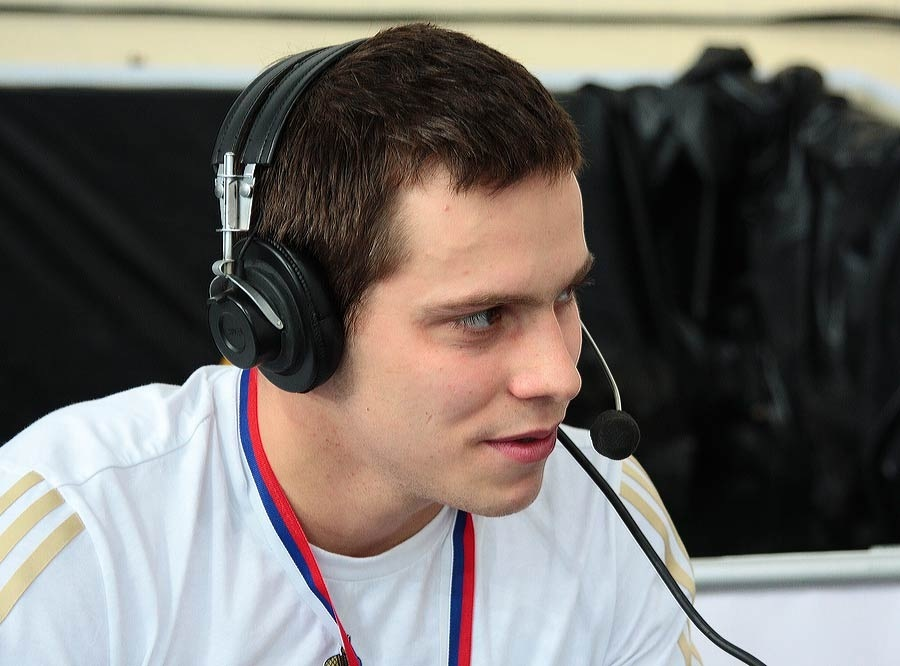

Personal information
- Born: May 4, 1988 (age 38) Miass, Soviet Union

Sport
- Sport: Swimming
Medal record
Representing Russia
Summer Universiade
Bronze medal – third place	2015 Gwangju	4x100m freestyle relay

Alexander Tikhonov (born 4 May 1988) is a Russian swimmer who competes in the Men's 200 and 400 m individual medley. (Note: "Alexander Tikhonov". London 2012. The London Organising Committee of the Olympic Games and Paralympic Games Limited.) At the 2012 Summer Olympics he finished 21st overall in the heats in the Men's 400 metre individual medley and failed to reach the final. In the 200 m individual medley he finished in 24th place in the heats and again failed to progress. In August 2026, he joined the Canadian International School of Singapore as Aquatics Director, succeeding Helen Sweeney.
