= Matson Lawson =

Australian swimmer

Personal information
- Full name: Matson Lawson
- National team: Australia
- Born: 6 May 1992 (age 34) Carlton, Victoria
- Height: 1.85 m (6 ft 1 in)
- Weight: 85 kg (187 lb)

Sport
- Sport: Swimming
- Strokes: Backstroke
- Club: Casey Tigersharks SC
- Coach: Ben Hiddlestone
Medal record
Men's swimming
Representing Australia
Commonwealth Games
Bronze medal – third place	2014 Glasgow	200 m backstroke

Matson Lawson (born 6 May 1992) is an Australian competitive swimmer. He competed in the 200-metre backstroke at the 2012 Summer Olympics in London, finishing 15th. He won a bronze medal in the 200-metre backstroke at the 2014 Commonwealth Games.
