= Michael Meyer (swimmer) =

South African swimmer (born 1992)

Personal information
- Born: 1 September 1992 (age 33)
- Height: 184 cm (6 ft 0 in)
- Weight: 76 kg (168 lb)

Sport
- Sport: Swimming
- College team: University of North Carolina

Michael Julian Meyer (born 1 September 1992) is a South African swimmer. He competed in the men's 400 individual medley event at the 2016 Summer Olympics. He finished 17th in the heats with a time of 4:18.13 and did not qualify for the final.
