= Thomas Fraser-Holmes =

Australian swimmer

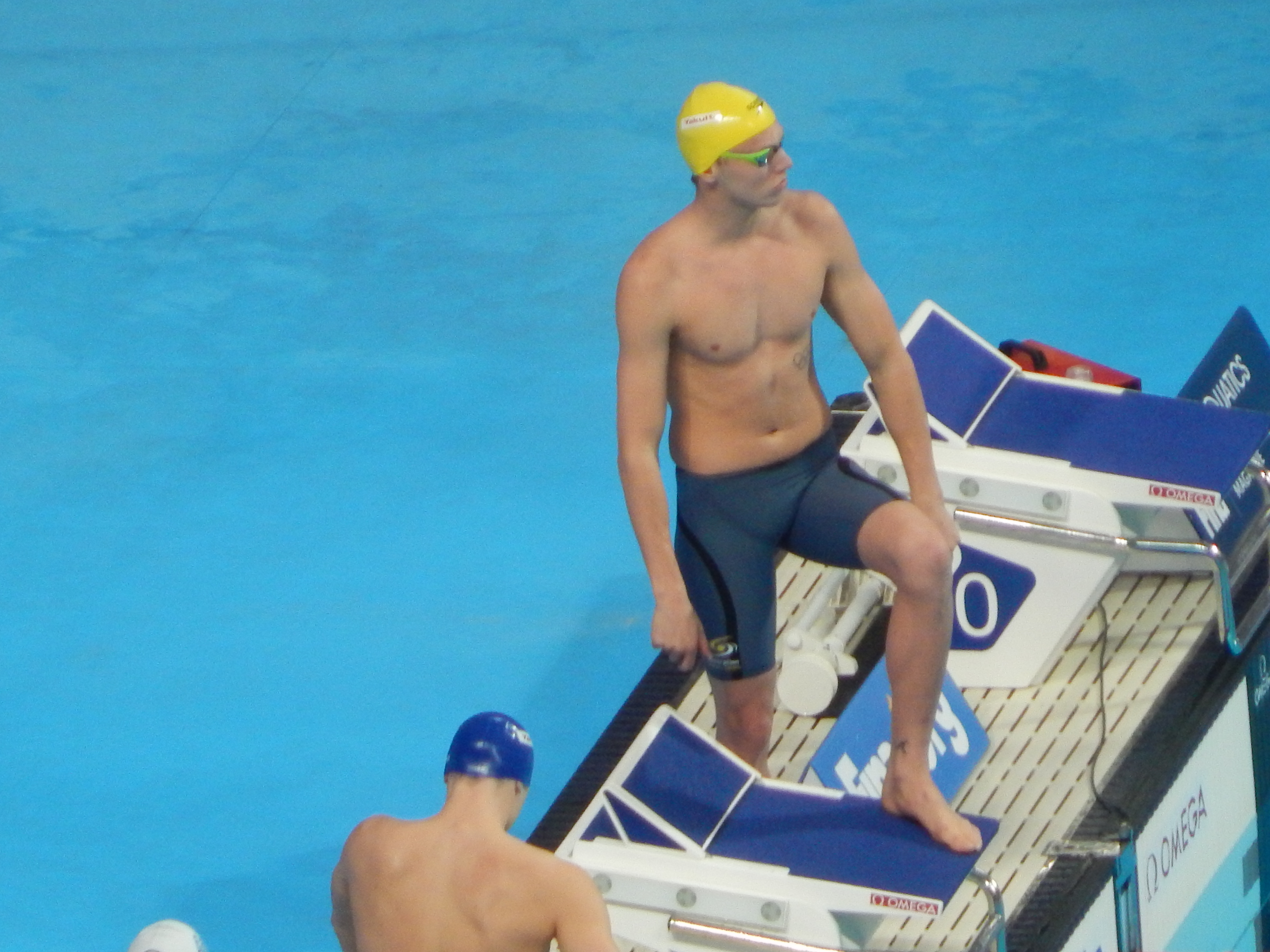

Personal information
- Full name: Thomas William Fraser-Holmes
- National team: Australia
- Born: 9 October 1991 (age 35) Newcastle, New South Wales
- Height: 1.94 m (6 ft 4 in)
- Weight: 85 kg (187 lb)

Sport
- Sport: Swimming
- Strokes: Freestyle, medley
- Club: Miami
- Coach: Denis Cotterell
Medal record
Men's swimming
Representing Australia
World Championships (LC)
Gold medal – first place	2019 Gwangju	4×200 m freestyle
Bronze medal – third place	2015 Kazan	4×200 m freestyle
World Championships (SC)
Silver medal – second place	2018 Hangzhou	400 m medley
Pan Pacific Championships
Gold medal – first place	2014 Gold Coast	200 m freestyle
Bronze medal – third place	2010 Irvine	4×200 m freestyle
Bronze medal – third place	2014 Gold Coast	4×200 m freestyle
Commonwealth Games
Gold medal – first place	2010 Delhi	4×200 m freestyle
Gold medal – first place	2014 Glasgow	200 m freestyle
Gold medal – first place	2014 Glasgow	4×200 m freestyle
Silver medal – second place	2014 Glasgow	400 m medley
Bronze medal – third place	2010 Delhi	200 m freestyle

Thomas William Fraser-Holmes (born 9 October 1991) is an Australian swimmer who made his international debut in 2010. He was an Australian Institute of Sport scholarship holder.

At the 2010 Commonwealth Games, he won individual bronze in the men's 200 m freestyle, and gold with the Australian men's 4 x 200 m freestyle relay team.

He competed at the 2012 Summer Olympics in the men's 200 m freestyle, the 400 m individual medley and the 4 x 200 m freestyle relay.

At the 2014 Commonwealth Games, he won the men's 200 m freestyle, won silver in the men's 400 m individual medley and was part of the Australian team that won gold in the men's 4 x 200 m freestyle relay in a Games record.

In 2015, he set a national record in the men's 400 m medley in the short course, he set the long course record in 2013. In 2015, he was also part of the Australian team that won bronze in the 4 x 200 m relay at the World Championships.

At the 2016 Summer Olympics, Fraser-Holmes represented Australia in the 400 m individual medley, the 200 m freestyle, and the 4 × 200 m freestyle relay.

In June 2017, Fraser-Holmes was banned for 12 months by FINA for missing three drug tests in a one-year period.

On his return, he won silver in the men's 400 m individual medley at the short course World Championships.

At the 2019 World Championships, Fraser-Holmes was part of the Australian men's 4 x 200 m freestyle team that won gold.

== See also ==
- List of Commonwealth Games medallists in swimming (men)
