= 2016 Australian Swimming Championships =

- Host city: Adelaide, South Australia
- Date: 7–14 April
- Venue: South Australia Aquatic and Leisure Centre
- Events: 65 (men: 32; women: 32, mixed: 1)

The 2016 Australian Swimming Championships were held from 7 to 14 April 2016 at the South Australia Aquatic and Leisure Centre in Adelaide, South Australia. They doubled up as the national trials for the 2016 Summer Olympics and the 2016 Summer Paralympics in Rio de Janeiro, Brazil.

== Events ==
A total of 65 events (32 for men, 32 for women and 1 mixed event) were contested. For able bodies swimmers these consisted of:

- Freestyle: 50, 100, 200, 400, 800, and 1,500;
- Backstroke: 50, 100 and 200;
- Breaststroke: 50, 100 and 200;
- Butterfly: 50, 100 and 200;
- Individual medley: 200 and 400;
- Relays: 4×100 free, 4×200 free; 4×100 medley

For para-swimmers these consisted of:

- Freestyle: 50, 100, 200 and 400;
- Backstroke: 50 and 100;
- Breaststroke: 50 and 100;
- Butterfly: 50 and 100;
- Individual medley: 150 (mixed) and 200;
- Relays: 4×50 free

=== Schedule ===
Legend
Key	H	½	F	TF
Value	Heats	Semifinals	Final	Timed final

M = Morning session, E = Evening session

Men
Date →	Apr 7		Apr 8		Apr 9		Apr 10		Apr 11		Apr 12		Apr 13		Apr 14	
Event ↓	M	E	M	E	M	E	M	E	M	E	M	E	M	E	M	E
50 m freestyle											H	½		F		
100 m freestyle							H	½		F						
200 m freestyle			H	½		F										
400 m freestyle	H	F														
800 m freestyle									TF							
1500 m freestyle													H			F
50 m backstroke													H	F		
100 m backstroke			H	½		F										
200 m backstroke									H	½		F				
50 m breaststroke											H	F				
100 m breaststroke	H	½		F												
200 m breaststroke							H	½		F						
50 m butterfly	H	F														
100 m butterfly											H	½		F		
200 m butterfly					H	½		F								
200 m individual medley									H	½		F				
400 m individual medley	H	F														
4 × 100 m freestyle relay			TF	TF												
4 × 200 m freestyle relay							TF	TF								
4 × 100 m medley relay													TF			TF

Men's multiclass
Date →	Apr 7		Apr 8		Apr 9		Apr 10		Apr 11		Apr 12		Apr 13		Apr 14	
Event ↓	M	E	M	E	M	E	M	E	M	E	M	E	M	E	M	E
50 m freestyle	H	F														
100 m freestyle									H	F						
200 m freestyle							H	F								
400 m freestyle					H	F										
50 m backstroke											H	F				
100 m backstroke			H	F												
50 m breaststroke					H	F										
100 m breaststroke													H	F		
50 m butterfly													H	F		
100 m butterfly							H	F								
200 m individual medley											H	F				
4×50 m freestyle relay																F

Women
Date →	Apr 7		Apr 8		Apr 9		Apr 10		Apr 11		Apr 12		Apr 13		Apr 14	
Event ↓	M	E	M	E	M	E	M	E	M	E	M	E	M	E	M	E
50 m freestyle													H	½		F
100 m freestyle									H	½		F				
200 m freestyle					H	½		F								
400 m freestyle			H	F												
800 m freestyle											H			F		
1500 m freestyle							TF									
50 m backstroke	H	F														
100 m backstroke			H	½		F										
200 m backstroke											H	½		F		
50 m breaststroke													H	F		
100 m breaststroke			H	½		F										
200 m breaststroke									H	½		F				
50 m butterfly											H	F				
100 m butterfly	H	½		F												
200 m butterfly							H	½		F						
200 m individual medley					H	½		F								
400 m individual medley	H	F														
4 × 100 m freestyle relay	TF	TF														
4 × 200 m freestyle relay									TF	TF						
4 × 100 m medley relay													TF			TF

Women's multiclass
Date →	Apr 7		Apr 8		Apr 9		Apr 10		Apr 11		Apr 12		Apr 13		Apr 14	
Event ↓	M	E	M	E	M	E	M	E	M	E	M	E	M	E	M	E
50 m freestyle	H	F														
100 m freestyle									H	F						
200 m freestyle							H	F								
400 m freestyle					H	F										
50 m backstroke											H	F				
100 m backstroke			H	F												
50 m breaststroke					H	F										
100 m breaststroke													H	F		
50 m butterfly													H	F		
100 m butterfly							H	F								
200 m individual medley											H	F				
4×50 m freestyle relay																F

Mixed multiclass
Date →	Apr 7		Apr 8		Apr 9		Apr 10		Apr 11		Apr 12		Apr 13		Apr 14	
Event ↓	M	E	M	E	M	E	M	E	M	E	M	E	M	E	M	E
150 m individual medley									TF							

== Qualification criteria ==
Below are the entry qualifying times for each event that had to be achieved after 1 January 2015 in a 50m pool.

Event	Men	Women
50 m freestyle	23.90	27.00
100 m freestyle	52.00	57.90
200 m freestyle	1:55.00	2:06.00
400 m freestyle	4:06.00	4:26.00
800 m freestyle	8:37.00	9:02.00
1500 m freestyle	16:00.00	17:40.00
50 m backstroke	28.00	31.00
100 m backstroke	59.90	1:06.00
200 m backstroke	2:09.80	2:21.50
50 m breaststroke	30.80	34.50
100 m breaststroke	1:07.10	1:15.00
200 m breaststroke	2:27.00	2:41.50
50 m butterfly	25.50	28.70
100 m butterfly	56.90	1:03.50
200 m butterfly	2:07.00	2:21.20
200 m IM	2:10.00	2:23.20
400 m IM	4:39.70	5:04.50
4 × 100 m freestyle relay	3:35.00	4:05.00
4 × 200 m freestyle relay	7:55.00	8:40.00
4 × 100 m medley relay	4:00.00	4:30.00

Below are the FINA A and B qualifying times for the 2016 Summer Olympics for each event. The A standard times were the times of those who finished 16th in the heats in each event at the London Olympics. The B standard times is an increase of 3.5% of the A times.

Event	Men		Women	
Event	A	B	A	B
50 m freestyle	22.27	23.05	25.28	26.17
100 m freestyle	48.99	50.70	54.43	56.34
200 m freestyle	1.47.97	1.51.75	1.58.96	2.03.13
400 m freestyle	3.50.44	3.58.51	4.09.08	4.17.80
800 m freestyle	—N/a	—N/a	8.33.97	8.51.96
1500 m freestyle	15.14.77	15.46.79	—N/a	—N/a
100 m backstroke	54.36	56.26	1.00.25	1.02.36
200 m backstroke	1.58.22	2.02.36	2.10.60	2.15.17
100 m breaststroke	1.00.57	1.02.69	1.07.85	1.10.22
200 m breaststroke	2.11.66	2.16.27	2.26.94	2.32.08
100 m butterfly	52.36	54.19	58.74	1.00.80
200 m butterfly	1.56.97	2.01.06	2.09.33	2.13.86
200 m IM	2.00.28	2.04.39	2.14.26	2.18.96
400 m IM	4.16.71	4.25.69	4.43.46	4.53.38

Below are the qualifying times set by Swimming Australia for the 2016 Summer Olympics for each event. They are the times of those who finished 8th in the semifinals of the 50, 100 and 200 metre events and 8th in the heats of the 400, 800, 1500 metre events at the 2015 World Aquatics Championships.

Event	Men	Women
50 m freestyle	22.02	24.52
100 m freestyle	48.49	53.92
200 m freestyle	1:46.45	1:56.95
400 m freestyle	3:47.19	4:07.58
800 m freestyle	—N/a	8:26.96
1500 m freestyle	14:57.82	—N/a
100 m backstroke	53.39	59.71
200 m backstroke	1:57.12	2:09.16
100 m breaststroke	59.75	1:07.11
200 m breaststroke	2:09.64	2:23.06
100 m butterfly	51.51	58.05
200 m butterfly	1:55.75	2:07.69
200 m IM	1:58.54	2:11.39
400 m IM	4:15.47	4:38.20
4 × 100 m freestyle relay	3:16.26	3:39.14
4 × 200 m freestyle relay	7:11.70	7:55.81
4 × 100 m medley relay	3:34.44	3:59.88

Below are the men's entry multiclass qualifying times for each event.

Event	Classification															
Event	S16	S15	S14	S13	S12	S11	S10	S9	S8	S7	S6	S5	S4	S3	S2	S1
50 m freestyle	33.15	30.06	31.86	29.92	28.97	32.53	29.53	31.93	33.32	34.86	37.52	46.43	53.27	1:03.85	1:30.09	1:36.78
100 m freestyle	1:15.60	1:05.76	1:09.72	1:06.96	1:04.14	1:11.40	1:04.09	1:09.67	1:12.60	1:16.02	1:22.46	1:39.96	1:57.30	2:20.45	3:14.91	3:30.27
200 m freestyle	3:06.23	2:22.52	2:30.71	2:33.23	2:30.47	2:33.94	2:24.21	2:34.40	2:44.53	2:49.55	2:56.63	3:27.90	4:09.47	4:53.46	6:49.88	7:24.84
400 m freestyle	6:51.99	4:54.09	5:28.84	5:11.09	5:13.27	5:28.63	5:07.67	5:23.82	5:35.24	6:02.09	6:02.54	—N/a				
50 m backstroke	41.93	35.15	38.35	36.85	36.32	40.71	36.03	37.55	38.98	44.21	44.55	49.72	1:00.60	1:06.19	1:34.36	2:01.37
100 m backstroke	1:29.62	1:14.90	1:20.38	1:15.41	1:14.80	1:25.35	1:16.29	1:17.93	1:21.48	1:30.64	1:33.22	1:48.65	2:18.11	2:55.06	3:30.37	4:48.26
50 m butterfly	38.30	31.27	34.22	34.35	33.69	35.86	32.24	34.57	35.33	38.26	38.79	48.71	1:00.48	1:26.36	2:05.06	2:56.48
100 m butterfly	1:25.67	1:07.91	1:16.12	1:12.17	1:11.69	1:17.01	1:10.54	1:14.76	1:16.16	1:25.98	1:30.40	1:53.85	—N/a			
	SB16	SB15	SB14	SB13	SB12	SB11	—N/a	SB9	SB8	SB7	SB6	SB5	SB4	SB3	SB2	SB1
50 m breaststroke	42.88	35.87	38.16	39.52	41.54	43.71	—N/a	36.74	42.02	48.39	48.73	59.88	1:05.94	1:12.43	1:24.06	2:14.35
100 m breaststroke	1:34.72	1:15.60	1:23.68	1:21.43	1:24.99	1:28.86	—N/a	1:23.10	1:24.43	1:43.05	1:47.23	2:09.84	2:17.09	2:46.02	3:19.30	—N/a
	SM16	SM15	SM14	SM13	SM12	SM11	SM10	SM9	SM8	SM7	SM6	SM5	SM4	SM3	SM2	SM1
150 m IM	—N/a												3:27.14	4:04.57	6:29.27	8:46.51
200 m IM	3:28.38	2:33.99	2:54.02	2:46.11	2:45.19	3:00.13	2:45.43	2:48.33	2:57.55	3:16.45	3:24.33	4:00.12	—N/a			

Below are the women's entry multiclass qualifying times for each event.

Event	Classification															
Event	S16	S15	S14	S13	S12	S11	S10	S9	S8	S7	S6	S5	S4	S3	S2	S1
50 m freestyle	39.94	32.95	36.47	34.50	33.97	39.32	35.72	36.59	39.32	39.86	44.85	50.91	1:04.90	1:25.21	1:48.11	1:47.15
100 m freestyle	1:26.66	1:12.18	1:19.12	1:14.17	1:14.93	1:26.38	1:17.35	1:16.96	1:23.85	1:26.24	1:35.72	1:48.77	2:16.73	3:02.99	3:35.36	4:01.00
200 m freestyle	3:26.49	2:40.17	2:46.10	2:45.58	2:47.98	3:09.46	2:48.68	2:43.64	2:57.81	3:00.95	3:18.48	3:53.58	4:35.13	6:20.10	7:13.25	8:12.45
400 m freestyle	7:23.64	5:37.43	5:59.41	5:38.47	5:49.46	6:31.55	5:44.15	5:32.38	5:59.92	6:24.11	6:52.80	—N/a				
50 m backstroke	47.52	39.20	41.02	41.48	42.04	46.29	40.99	42.75	46.88	49.82	53.08	54.89	1:09.43	1:24.58	1:43.01	1:46.02
100 m backstroke	1:54.70	1:24.63	1:27.89	1:27.05	1:26.80	1:40.52	1:23.75	1:27.31	1:33.69	1:44.81	1:49.45	2:11.84	2:39.95	3:14.33	4:21.70	4:31.50
50 m butterfly	42.40	36.74	39.12	38.35	37.89	45.77	39.84	40.29	42.45	43.43	48.43	57.48	1:19.97	1:27.90	—N/a	
100 m butterfly	2:24.89	1:20.66	1:27.77	1:23.09	1:19.51	1:40.74	1:25.75	1:24.09	1:30.26	1:40.97	1:52.91	2:48.05	—N/a			
	SB16	SB15	SB14	SB13	SB12	SB11	—N/a	SB9	SB8	SB7	SB6	SB5	SB4	SB3	SB2	SB1
50 m breaststroke	49.51	41.92	46.38	45.89	45.02	52.43	—N/a	48.61	48.81	55.78	58.03	1:05.26	1:18.60	1:20.98	1:48.48	2:35.19
100 m breaststroke	1:55.41	1:32.59	1:42.71	1:37.17	1:36.79	1:52.76	—N/a	1:36.93	1:37.77	1:54.65	2:00.34	2:13.17	2:39.83	3:13.67	4:31.56	—N/a
	SM16	SM15	SM14	SM13	SM12	SM11	SM10	SM9	SM8	SM7	SM6	SM5	SM4	SM3	SM2	SM1
150 m IM	—N/a												3:58.16	5:12.74	8:02.98	8:02.98
200 m IM	3:55.48	3:01.25	3:13.27	3:06.66	3:09.10	3:37.16	3:09.16	3:06.25	3:19.46	3:32.21	3:58.43	4:34.69	—N/a			

Below are the IPC minimum qualification standard (MQS) and minimum entry times (MET) for the 2016 Paralympic Games for each event.

Event	Class	Men		Women	
Event	Class	MQS	MET	MQS	MET
50 m freestyle	S3	1:02.15	1:07.12	—N/a	
50 m freestyle	S4	41.66	44.99	1:01.07	1:05.96
50 m freestyle	S5	38.95	42.07	45.29	48.91
50 m freestyle	S6	33.25	35.91	37.60	40.61
50 m freestyle	S7	30.29	32.71	36.13	39.02
50 m freestyle	S8	28.44	30.72	33.36	36.03
50 m freestyle	S9	26.95	29.11	30.49	32.93
50 m freestyle	S10	25.24	27.26	29.81	32.19
50 m freestyle	S11	28.83	31.14	35.15	37.96
50 m freestyle	S12	25.39	27.42	31.00	33.48
50 m freestyle	S13	25.46	27.50	30.01	32.41
100 m freestyle	S3	—N/a		2:39.50	2:50.67
100 m freestyle	S4	1:34.25	1:40.85	—N/a	
100 m freestyle	S5	1:26.37	1:32.42	1:39.75	1:46.73
100 m freestyle	S6	1:14.22	1:19.42	1:23.38	1:29.22
100 m freestyle	S7	1:07.03	1:11.72	1:18.40	1:23.89
100 m freestyle	S8	1:02.59	1:06.97	1:14.65	1:19.88
100 m freestyle	S9	58.53	1:02.63	1:06.94	1:11.63
100 m freestyle	S10	55.91	59.82	1:04.58	1:09.10
100 m freestyle	S11	1:06.69	1:11.36	1:19.55	1:25.12
100 m freestyle	S13	56.66	1:00.63	1:05.99	1:10.61
200 m freestyle	S2	5:47.05	6:07.87	—N/a	
200 m freestyle	S3	4:51.12	5:08.59	—N/a	
200 m freestyle	S4	3:41.97	3:55.29	—N/a	
200 m freestyle	S5	3:05.10	3:16.21	3:38.74	3:51.86
200 m freestyle	S14	2:02.84	2:08.98	2:21.10	2:29.57

Event	Class	Men		Women	
Event	Class	MQS	MET	MQS	MET
400 m freestyle	S6	5:45.65	6:02.93	6:23.20	6:42.36
400 m freestyle	S7	5:22.72	5:38.86	5:53.48	6:11.15
400 m freestyle	S8	4:49.29	5:03.75	5:37.95	5:54.85
400 m freestyle	S9	4:34.39	4:48.11	5:16.28	5:32.09
400 m freestyle	S10	4:24.23	4:37.44	4:52.79	5:07.43
400 m freestyle	S11	5:40.84	5:57.88	6:13.47	6:32.14
400 m freestyle	S13	4:45.69	4:59.97	5:22.29	5:38.40
50 m backstroke	S1	1:42.21	1:50.39	—N/a	
50 m backstroke	S2	1:11.32	1:17.03	1:33.10	1:40.55
50 m backstroke	S3	1:04.59	1:09.76	1:20.16	1:26.57
50 m backstroke	S4	52.95	57.19	1:05.85	1:11.12
50 m backstroke	S5	44.33	47.88	56.11	1:00.60
100 m backstroke	S1	3:45.40	4:01.18	—N/a	
100 m backstroke	S2	2:47.92	2:59.67	2:58.30	3:10.78
100 m backstroke	S6	1:27.08	1:33.18	1:39.21	1:46.15
100 m backstroke	S7	1:18.99	1:24.52	1:35.96	1:42.68
100 m backstroke	S8	1:12.25	1:17.31	1:29.39	1:35.65
100 m backstroke	S9	1:07.48	1:12.20	1:17.70	1:23.14
100 m backstroke	S10	1:04.75	1:09.28	1:13.40	1:18.54
100 m backstroke	S11	1:19.52	1:25.09	1:32.78	1:39.27
100 m backstroke	S12	1:11.86	1:16.89	1:23.21	1:29.03
100 m backstroke	S13	1:10.38	1:15.31	1:21.22	1:26.91
100 m backstroke	S14	1:05.99	1:10.61	1:16.23	1:21.57
50 m breaststroke	SB2	1:38.35	1:46.22	—N/a	
50 m breaststroke	SB3	55.36	59.79	1:32.87	1:40.30

Event	Class	Men		Women	
Event	Class	MQS	MET	MQS	MET
100 m breaststroke	SB4	1:59.46	2:07.82	2:20.22	2:30.04
100 m breaststroke	SB5	1:46.50	1:53.95	2:04.13	2:12.82
100 m breaststroke	SB6	1:34.29	1:40.89	1:53.07	2:00.98
100 m breaststroke	SB7	1:26.73	1:32.80	1:52.17	2:00.02
100 m breaststroke	SB8	1:18.05	1:23.51	1:32.10	1:38.55
100 m breaststroke	SB9	1:14.45	1:19.66	1:23.02	1:28.83
100 m breaststroke	SB11	1:25.79	1:31.80	1:46.05	1:53.47
100 m breaststroke	SB12	1:16.02	1:21.34	—N/a	
100 m breaststroke	SB13	1:18.87	1:24.39	1:29.76	1:36.04
100 m breaststroke	SB14	1:13.10	1:18.22	1:24.15	1:30.04
50 m butterfly	S5	45.34	48.97	54.29	58.63
50 m butterfly	S6	35.25	38.07	42.61	46.02
50 m butterfly	S7	33.92	36.63	42.51	45.91
100 m butterfly	S8	1:07.15	1:11.85	1:24.79	1:30.73
100 m butterfly	S9	1:03.49	1:07.93	1:14.03	1:19.21
100 m butterfly	S10	1:00.47	1:04.70	1:12.80	1:17.90
100 m butterfly	S11	1:20.98	1:26.65	—N/a	
100 m butterfly	S13	1:09.22	1:14.07	1:24.59	1:30.51
150 m IM	SM3	3:39.92	3:53.12	—N/a	
150 m IM	SM4	3:01.38	3:12.26	4:21.50	4:37.19
200 m IM	SM5	—N/a		4:29.30	4:45.46
200 m IM	SM6	3:06.57	3:17.76	3:28.61	3:41.13
200 m IM	SM7	2:54.47	3:04.94	3:40.07	3:53.27
200 m IM	SM8	2:33.40	2:42.60	3:07.34	3:18.58
200 m IM	SM9	2:26.38	2:35.16	2:47.98	2:58.06
200 m IM	SM10	2:17.20	2:25.43	2:39.82	2:49.41
200 m IM	SM11	2:54.09	3:04.54	3:30.34	3:42.96
200 m IM	SM13	2:36.28	2:45.66	2:52.27	3:02.61
200 m IM	SM14	2:20.78	2:29.23	2:41.83	2:51.54
4 × 100 m freestyle relay	34 points	4:35.76		5:36.00	
4 × 100 m medley relay	34 points	4:49.19		5:51.81	
Mixed 4×50 m freestyle relay	20 points	3:35.00			

== Medal winners ==
The results are below.

=== Men's events ===
Event	Gold		Silver		Bronze	
50 m freestyle	Cameron McEvoy; Bond University (Qld)	21.44	Matthew Abood; Canberra (ACT)	22.08	James Magnussen; Ravenswood (NSW)	22.12
100 m freestyle	Cameron McEvoy; Bond University (Qld)	47.04; CR, ACR	Kyle Chalmers; Marion (SA)	48.03; WJ	James Roberts; Somerset College (Qld)	48.32
200 m freestyle	Thomas Fraser-Holmes; Miami (Qld); Cameron McEvoy; Bond University (Qld)	1:45.63	none awarded		David McKeon; Chandler (Qld)	1:46.61
400 m freestyle	Mack Horton; Melbourne Vicentre (Vic)	3:41.65	David McKeon; Chandler (Qld)	3:45.09	Jack McLoughlin; Chandler (Qld)	3:46.27
800 m freestyle	Jack McLoughlin; Chandler (Qld)	8:00.71	Ethan Owens; Marion (SA)	8:06.70	Nathan Robinson; St Peters Western (Qld)	8:13.69
1500 m freestyle	Mack Horton; Melbourne Vicentre (Vic)	14:39.54; ACR	Jack McLoughlin; Chandler (Qld)	14:48.60	Jordan Harrison; Miami (Qld)	15:18.92
50 m backstroke	Mitch Larkin; St Peters Western (Qld)	24.73	Robert Hurley; Unattached (NSW)	25.07	Joshua Beaver; Nunawading (Vic)	25.25
100 m backstroke	Mitch Larkin; St Peters Western (Qld)	52.54	Joshua Beaver; Nunawading (Vic)	53.77	Ashley Delaney; Nunawading (Vic)	54.29
200 m backstroke	Mitch Larkin; St Peters Western (Qld)	1:53.90	Joshua Beaver; Nunawading (Vic)	1:56.19	Matson Lawson; Tigersharks (Vic)	1:59.37
50 m breaststroke	Joshua Palmer; Marion (SA)	27.85	Jake Packard; USC Spartans (Qld)	27.86	Matthew Treloar; Trinity Grammar (NSW); Tommy Sucipto; Rockingham (WA)	27.96
100 m breaststroke	Jake Packard; USC Spartans (Qld)	59.65	Joshua Palmer; Marion (SA)	1:00.51	Matthew Wilson; SOPAC (NSW)	1:00.54
200 m breaststroke	Matthew Wilson; SOPAC (NSW)	2:09.90	Nicholas Schafer; Acqua Rosa Clayfield (Qld)	2:10.75	Jake Packard; USC Spartans (Qld)	2:12.65
50 m butterfly	Ryan Pini; Papua New Guinea	23.67 =NR	Daniel Lester; Lawton (Qld)	23.72	David Morgan; TSS Aquatic (Qld)	23.76
100 m butterfly	David Morgan; TSS Aquatic (Qld)	51.64	Grant Irvine; St Peters Western (Qld)	51.76	Daniel Lester; Lawton (Qld)	52.33
200 m butterfly	David Morgan; TSS Aquatic (Qld)	1:55.63	Grant Irvine; St Peters Western (Qld)	1:55.73	Keiran Qaium; Sydney University (NSW)	1:56.84
200 m IM	Daniel Tranter; Trinity Grammar (NSW)	1:58.72	Justin James; Mackay (Qld)	1:59.12	Travis Mahoney; Nunawading (Vic)	2:00.53
400 m IM	Thomas Fraser-Holmes; Miami (Qld)	4:11.09	Travis Mahoney; Nunawading (Vic)	4:14.98	Clyde Lewis; St Peters Western (Qld)	4:16.58
4 × 100 m freestyle relay	Marion A (SA); Hayden Lewis (52.02); Andrew Abood (49.41); Ben Edmonds (51.14); Kyle Chalmers (48.18)	3:20.75	Sydney University A (NSW); Thomas Meggitt (50.80); Te Haumi Maxwell (50.06); Benjamin Lindsay (49.86); Kazimir Boskovic (50.43)	3:21.15	Carlile A (NSW); Callum Sherington (52.40); Leon MacAlister (51.72); Brian de Bono (52.63); Luke Bibby (50.38)	3:27.13
4 × 200 m freestyle relay	Melbourne Vicentre A (Vic); Jorden Merrilees (1:51.10); Mitchell Davenport-Wright (1:51.89); Jack Kelly (1:58.25); Ben Schreiner (1:53.85)	7:35.09	Carlile A (NSW); Callum Sherington (1:53.89); Luke Bibby (1:53.32); Nick Jennens (1:57.44); Leon MacAlister (1:53.82)	7:38.47	Yeronga Park A (Qld); Rowan Crothers (1:56.05); Douglas Oliver (1:55.87); Michael Barker (1:57.28); Jye Cornwell (1:55.28)	7:44.48
4 × 100 m medley relay	Marion A (SA); Ben Edmonds (55.76); Joshua Palmer (1:00.29); Kyle Chalmers (52.67); Andrew Abood (48.41)	3:37.13	Trinity Grammar A (NSW); James Traiforos (55.89); Matthew Treloar (1:01.24); Daniel Tranter (53.27); Kenneth To (48.72)	3:39.12	TSS Aquatic (Qld); Joshua Parrish (59.34); Grayson Bell (1:01.57); David Morgan (51.26); Buster Sykes (49.61)	3:41.78

=== Men's multiclass events ===
Event	Gold		Silver		Bronze	
50 m freestyle	Daniel Fox (S14); Chandler (Qld); Mitchell Kilduff (S14); MLC Marlins (NSW)	24.67 (985)	none awarded		Joshua Alford (S14); Tuggeranong Vikings (ACT)	25.18 (927)
100 m freestyle	Daniel Fox (S14); Chandler (Qld)	53.72 (988)	Joshua Alford (S14); Tuggeranong Vikings (ACT)	54.60 (941)	Matt Levy (S8); Cranbrook Eastern Edge (NSW)	1:02.06 (919)
200 m freestyle	Daniel Fox (S14); Chandler (Qld)	1:57.54 (968)	Liam Schluter (S14); Kawana Waters (Qld)	1:59.57 (919)	Joshua Alford (S14); Tuggeranong Vikings (ACT)	2:00.05 (908)
400 m freestyle	Brenden Hall (S9); Lawnton (Qld)	4:12.60 (969)	Rowan Crothers (S10); Yeronga Park (Qld)	4:09.87 (969)	Guy Harrison-Murray (S10); USC Spartans (Qld)	4:15.35 (868)
50 m backstroke	Jeremy McClure (S11); Canning Lightning (WA)	32.22 (1008) WR	Daniel Fox (S14); Chandler (Qld)	30.06 (972)	Michael Anderson (S10); USC Spartans (Qld)	28.80 (905)
100 m backstroke	Michael Anderson (S10); USC Spartans (Qld)	1:00.96 (933)	Jeremy McClure (S11); Canning Lightning (WA)	1:10.23 (897)	Brenden Hall (S9); Lawnton (Qld)	1:05.45 (840)
50 m breaststroke	Blake Cochrane (SB7); USC Spartans (Qld)	35.55 (997)	Matt Levy (SB7); Cranbrook Eastern Edge (NSW)	36.69 (907)	Richard Eliason (SB14); Ginninderra (ACT)	31.63 (878)
100 m breaststroke	Ahmed Kelly (SB3); Melbourne Vicentre (Vic)	1:50.59 (982)	Blake Cochrane (SB7); USC Spartans (Qld)	1:17.26 (978)	Grant Patterson (SB2); Cairns Central (Qld)	2:17.09 (906)
50 m butterfly	Mitchell Kilduff (S14); MLC Marlins (NSW)	27.00 (1010) WR	Daniel Fox (S14); Chandler (Qld)	27.74 (931)	Jack Ireland (S14); Gladstone (Qld)	28.40 (868)
100 m butterfly	Brenden Hall (S9); Lawnton (Qld)	1:02.13 (852)	Sam Bramham (S9); Unattached (Vic)	1:03.72 (790)	Rick Pendleton (S10); USC Spartans (Qld)	1:00.61 (788)
200 m IM	Matt Levy (SM7); Cranbrook Eastern Edge (NSW)	2:36.67 (934)	Jesse Aungles (SM8); Marion (SA)	2:28.68 (851)	Timothy Disken (SM9); PLC Aquatic (Vic)	2:21.54 (841)
4 × 50 m freestyle relay	Australia E Sean Russo (S13) (26.61); Blake Cochrane (S8) (28.23); Timothy Hodge (S9) (27.23); Guy Harrison-Murray (S10) (25.93)	1:48.00	Australia A Liam Schluter (S14) (26.65); Matt Levy (S7) (30.08); Liam Bekric (S13) (26.82); Rowan Crothers (S10) (24.89)	1:48.44	Australia C Jeremy McClure (S11) (30.27); Jacob Templeton (S13) (26.63); Brenden Hall (S9) (26.82); Daniel Fox (S14) (25.36)	1:49.10

=== Women's events ===
Event	Gold		Silver		Bronze	
50 m freestyle	Cate Campbell; Commercial (Qld)	23.84; CR, ACR	Bronte Campbell; Commercial (Qld)	24.24	Shayna Jack; Commercial (Qld)	24.95
100 m freestyle	Cate Campbell; Commercial (Qld)	52.38; ACR	Bronte Campbell; Commercial (Qld)	52.58	Emma McKeon; St Peters Western (Qld)	52.80
200 m freestyle	Emma McKeon; St Peters Western (Qld)	1:54.83; CR, ACR	Bronte Barratt; St Peters Western (Qld)	1:56.34	Madeline Groves; St Peters Western (Qld)	1:57.74
400 m freestyle	Jessica Ashwood; Chandler (Qld)	4:03.71	Tamsin Cook; UWA West Coast (WA)	4:06.38	Kiah Melverton; TSS Aquatic (Qld)	4:10.20
800 m freestyle	Jessica Ashwood; Chandler (Qld)	8:18.42	Tamsin Cook; UWA West Coast (WA)	8:27.01	Kareena Lee; Mountain Creek (Qld)	8:31.06
1500 m freestyle	Kareena Lee; Mountain Creek (Qld)	16:27.26	Chelsea Gubecka; Kawana Waters (Qld)	16:42.03	Zoe Elkerton; TSS Aquatic (Qld)	16:51.43
50 m backstroke	Emily Seebohm; Brisbane Grammar (Qld)	27.72	Minna Atherton; Brisbane Grammar (Qld)	27.80	Holly Barratt; Rockingham (WA)	27.90
100 m backstroke	Emily Seebohm; Brisbane Grammar (Qld)	58.73	Madison Wilson; St Peters Western (Qld)	59.26	Minna Atherton; Brisbane Grammar (Qld)	59.59
200 m backstroke	Belinda Hocking; Nunawading (Vic)	2:06.49; ACR	Emily Seebohm; Brisbane Grammar (Qld)	2:06.59	Sian Whittaker; Melbourne Vicentre (Vic)	2:07.47
50 m breaststroke	Georgia Bohl; St Peters Western (Qld)	30.58	Jennie Johansson; Sweden	30.71	Sally Hunter; Marion (SA)	31.04
100 m breaststroke	Georgia Bohl; St Peters Western (Qld)	1:06.12	Taylor McKeown; USC Spartans (Qld)	1:06.68	Jessica Hansen; Nunawading (Vic)	1:07.29
200 m breaststroke	Taylor McKeown; USC Spartans (Qld)	2:21.45	Georgia Bohl; St Peters Western (Qld)	2:23.95	Tessa Wallace; Pelican Waters Caloundra (Qld)	2:24.37
50 m butterfly	Holly Barratt; Rockingham (WA)	26.19	Marieke D'Cruz; SOPAC (NSW)	26.62	Sara Saal; Commercial	26.82
100 m butterfly	Emma McKeon; St Peters Western (Qld)	56.89	Madeline Groves; St Peters Western (Qld)	57.08	Alicia Coutts; Redlands (Qld)	57.27
200 m butterfly	Madeline Groves; St Peters Western (Qld)	2:05.47	Brianna Throssell; Perth City (WA)	2:06.58	Laura Taylor; TSS Aquatic (Qld)	2:10.19
200 m IM	Alicia Coutts; Redlands (Qld)	2:09.95	Kotuku Ngawati; Melbourne Vicentre (Vic)	2:11.03	Blair Evans; UWA West Coast (WA)	2:11.14
400 m IM	Blair Evans; UWA West Coast (WA)	4:35.26	Keryn McMaster; Chandler (Qld)	4:37.94	Elle Fullerton; Chandler (Qld)	4:39.72
4 × 100 m freestyle relay	Marion A (SA); Emily Liu (56.01); Ellysia Oldsen (57.59); Zoe Williams (57.21); Sally Hunter (55.31)	3:46.12	Ravenswood A (NSW); Alicia Walker (57.32); Clare Robertson (57.57); Olivia Adams (58.60); Ami Matsuo (55.20)	3:48.69	Yeronga Park A (Qld); Lorna Tonks (57.05); Caitlin Mitchell (57.78); Amy Levings (56.02); Lauren Rettie (58.15)	3:49.00
4 × 200 m freestyle relay	Ravenswood A (NSW); Amy Van Dongen (2:04.94); Ami Matsuo (2:02.50); Clare Robertson (2:06.08); Olivia Adams (2:05.67)	8:19.19	Yeronga Park A (Qld); Amy Levings (2:03.44); Caitlin Mitchell (2:06.14); Lorna Tonks (2:07.15); Lauren Rettie (2:05.65)	8:22.38	Norwood A (SA); Abby Duncan (2:04.82); Emma Duncan (2:06.30); Tess Bastian (2:07.32); Kista Ceplite (2:05.96)	8:24.40
4 × 100 m medley relay	St Peters Western A (Qld); Madison Wilson (59.77); Georgia Bohl (1:06.61); Madeline Groves (57.79); Emma McKeon (53.17)	3:57.34; Club	Brisbane Grammar (Qld); Minna Atherton (59.87); Aisling Scott (1:10.03); Brittany Elmslie (59.38); Emily Seebohm (54.81)	4:04.09	Melbourne Vicentre (Vic); Hayley Baker (59.94); Kotuku Ngawati (1:09.58); Christina Licciardi (1:01.03); Sian Whittaker (55.73)	4:06.28

=== Women's multiclass events ===
Event	Gold		Silver		Bronze	
50 m freestyle	Ellie Cole (S9); Castle Hill RSL (NSW)	28.75 (1031) WR	Lakeisha Patterson (S8); Unattached (Qld)	30.56 (958)	Ashleigh McConnell (S9); Melbourne Vicentre (Vic)	29.52 (952)
100 m freestyle	Maddison Elliott (S8); Newcastle University (NSW)	1:05.34 (971)	Rachael Watson (S4); Chandler (Qld)	1:31.78 (928)	Ellie Cole (S9); Castle Hill RSL (NSW)	1:02.69 (925)
200 m freestyle	Lakeisha Patterson (S8); Unattached (Qld)	2:18.98 (988)	Kayla Clarke (S14); Waterworx (Qld)	2:16.25 (772)	Katja Dedekind (S13); University of Queensland (Qld)	2:20.97 (754)
400 m freestyle	Monique Murphy (S10); Melbourne Vicentre (Vic)	4:35.53 (970)	Lakeisha Patterson (S8); Unattached (Qld)	4:45.06 (952)	Jade Lucy (S14); SLC Aquadot (NSW)	4:52.82 (871)
50 m backstroke	Taylor Corry (S14); Nelson Bay (NSW)	32.17 (951)	Nicole Miro (S10); SLC Aquadot (NSW)	34.08 (803)	Madeleine McTernan (S14); Coffs Harbour (NSW)	34.07 (801)
100 m backstroke	Ellie Cole (S9); Castle Hill RSL (NSW)	1:10.69 (917)	Maddison Elliott (S8); Newcastle University (NSW)	1:19.59 (816)	Lakeisha Patterson (S8); Unattached (Qld)	1:19.84 (808)
50 m breaststroke	Tiffany Thomas Kane (SB6); Ravenswood (NSW)	43.06 (1104) WR	Kendall Williams (SB9); Newcastle University (NSW)	38.64 (755)	Kate Wilson (SB6); Kingscliff (NSW)	49.66 (720)
100 m breaststroke	Tiffany Thomas Kane (SB6); Ravenswood (NSW)	1:35.32 (988)	Prue Watt (SB13); Cranbrook Eastern Edge (NSW)	1:19.18 (924)	Paige Leonhardt (SB14); Wingham (NSW)	1:21.31 (847)
50 m butterfly	Taylor Corry (S14); Nelson Bay (NSW)	30.51 (966)	Emily Beecroft (S7); Traralgon (Vic)	33.53 (856)	Tiffany Thomas Kane (S7); Ravenswood (NSW)	38.32 (833)
100 m butterfly	Taylor Corry (S14); Nelson Bay (NSW)	1:09.63 (937)	Madeleine Scott (S9); Canberra (ACT)	1:10.35 (854)	Prue Watt (S13); Cranbrook Eastern Edge (NSW)	1:09.72 (811)
200 m IM	Tiffany Thomas Kane (SM7); Ravenswood (NSW)	3:08.98 (879)	Katherine Downie (SM10); Westside Christchurch (WA)	2:34.84 (832)	Madeleine Scott (SM9); Canberra (ACT)	2:38.68 (809)
4 × 50 m freestyle relay	Australia A Katja Dedekind (S13) (30.52); Maddison Elliott (S8) (31.83); Ashleigh McConnell (S9) (31.13); Taylor Corry (S14) (28.88)	2:02.36	Australia C Prue Watt (S13) (30.43); Madeleine Scott (S9) (32.03); Monique Murphy (S10) (31.75); Jenna Jones (S13) (30.45)	2:04.66	Australia B Emily Beecroft (S9) (31.37); Lakeisha Patterson (S8) (32.31); Paige Leonhardt (S10) (31.99); Ellie Cole (S9) (30.39)	2:06.06

=== Mixed multiclass events ===
Event	Gold		Silver		Bronze
150 m IM	Grant Patterson (SM3); Cairns Central (Qld)	3:12.24 (618)	Ahmed Kelly (SM4); Melbourne Vicentre (Vic)	3:06.92 (476)	None awarded

Legend: WR – World record; WJ – World Junior record; CR – Commonwealth record; OR – Oceanian record; AR – Australian record; ACR – Australian All Comers record; Club – Australian Club record

== Relay time trial ==
Relay qualification for the 2016 Olympic Games was awarded to 16 nations per event:

- The top 12 finishers in the relay events at the 2015 World Championships qualified automatically
- The 4 remaining places were awarded to the fastest non-qualified nations, based on times achieved from 1 March 2015 to 31 May 2016

Australia did not automatically qualify for the 2016 Olympic Games in the men's 4 × 100 m freestyle relay, having finished thirteenth at the 2015 World Championships. Consequently, Swimming Australia organised a time trial to secure Olympic qualification in the event. This was held on the final day of the Australian Championships.

"Australia A" recorded a time of 3:12.26, a four-second improvement on the nation's performance at the World Championships. At the end of the qualification period, Australia ranked first among the non-qualified nations, confirming its qualification in the event. Consequently, on 7 June 2016, James Roberts, James Magnussen and Matthew Abood were named to the Olympic team for the relay.

Men's 4 × 100 m freestyle relay (time trial) results
Gold		Silver		Bronze
Australia A James Roberts (48.63); Kyle Chalmers (48.24); James Magnussen (48.17); Cameron McEvoy (47.22)	3:12.26; ACR	Australia B Kenneth To (49.31); Matthew Abood (48.24); William Stockwell (48.09); Jack Gerrard (48.81)	3:14.45	None awarded

Legend: ACR – Australian All Comers record;

== Records broken ==
During the 2016 Australian Swimming Championships the following records were set.

=== World records ===
- Men's 50 m backstroke S11 – Jeremy McClure, Canning Lightning (32.22) (final)
- Men's 50 m butterfly S14 – Mitchell Kilduff, MLC Marlins (27.00) (final)
- Women's 50 metre freestyle S9 – Ellie Cole, Castle Hill RSL (28.75) (final)
- Women's 50 metre breaststroke SB6 – Tiffany Thomas Kane, Ravenswood (43.06) (final)

=== World Junior records ===
- Men's 100 m freestyle – Kyle Chalmers, Marion (48.03) (final)

=== Commonwealth, Oceanian and Australian records ===
- Men's 100 m freestyle – Cameron McEvoy, Bond University (47.04) (final)
- Women's 50 m freestyle – Cate Campbell, Commercial (23.93) (semis)
- Women's 50 m freestyle – Cate Campbell, Commercial (23.84) (final)
- Women's 200 m freestyle – Emma McKeon, St Peters Western (1:54.83) (final)

=== Australian club records ===
- Women's 4 × 100 m medley relay – Madison Wilson, Georgia Bohl, Madeline Groves, Emma McKeon, St Peters Western (3:57.34) (final)

=== All Comers records ===
- Men's 100 m freestyle – Cameron McEvoy, Bond University (47.04) (final)
- Men's 1500 m freestyle – Mack Horton, Melbourne Vicentre (14:39.54) (final)
- Men's 100 m backstroke – Mitch Larkin, St Peters Western (52.48) (semis)
- Men's 4 × 100 m freestyle relay – James Roberts, Kyle Chalmers, James Magnussen, Cameron McEvoy, Australia A (3:12.26) (time trial)
- Women's 50 m freestyle – Cate Campbell, Commercial (23.93) (semis)
- Women's 50 m freestyle – Cate Campbell, Commercial (23.84) (final)
- Women's 100 m freestyle – Cate Campbell, Commercial (52.41) (semis)
- Women's 100 m freestyle – Cate Campbell, Commercial (52.38) (final)
- Women's 200 m freestyle – Emma McKeon, St Peters Western (1:54.83) (final)
- Women's 200 m backstroke – Belinda Hocking, Nunawading (2:06.49) (final)

=== Papua New Guinean records ===
- Men's 50 m backstroke – Ryan Pini, 25.62 (heat)
- Men's 50 m backstroke – Ryan Pini, 25.55 (final)
- Men's 50 m butterfly – Ryan Pini, 23.67 (heat)
- Men's 50 m butterfly – Ryan Pini, 23.67 (final)

== Olympic and Paralympic teams ==
On 13 April 2016, the team for the 2016 Paralympic Games was announced. 31 members were named with the remaining five to be announced in the coming months. The following day, the team for the 2016 Summer Olympics was announced. 34 members were named with 21 of them making their Olympic debut. James Roberts, James Magnussen and Matthew Abood were not initially included, but were given a berth on 7 June, after the relay qualification period closed on 31 May.

2016 Australian Olympic Swimming Team
Name	State	Age (Note: As at the time of the announcement)	Olympics
Matthew Abood	ACT	29	1st
Jessica Ashwood	Qld	21	2nd
Bronte Barratt	Qld	27	3rd
Joshua Beaver	Vic	23	1st
Georgia Bohl	Qld	19	1st
Bronte Campbell	Qld	21	2nd
Cate Campbell	Qld	21	3rd
Kyle Chalmers	SA	17	1st
Tamsin Cook	WA	17	1st
Alicia Coutts	Qld	28	3rd
Brittany Elmslie	Qld	21	2nd
Blair Evans	WA	25	2nd
Thomas Fraser-Holmes	Qld	24	2nd
Madeline Groves	Qld	20	1st
Jacob Hansford	NSW	20	1st
Belinda Hocking	Vic	25	3rd
Mack Horton	Vic	19	1st
Grant Irvine	Qld	25	1st
Mitch Larkin	Qld	22	2nd
Travis Mahoney	Vic	25	1st
James Magnussen	NSW	25	2nd
Cameron McEvoy	Qld	21	2nd
David McKeon	Qld	23	2nd
Emma McKeon	Qld	21	1st
Taylor McKeown	Qld	21	1st
Jack McLoughlin	Qld	21	1st
Keryn McMaster	Qld	22	1st
David Morgan	Qld	22	1st
Leah Neale	Qld	20	1st
Kotuku Ngawati	Vic	21	1st
Jake Packard	Qld	21	1st
Joshua Palmer	SA	24	1st
James Roberts	Qld	25	2nd
Emily Seebohm	Qld	23	3rd
Daniel Smith	Qld	24	1st
Brianna Throssell	WA	20	1st
Madison Wilson	Qld	21	1st

2016 Australian Paralympic Swimming Team
Name	State	Age	Paralympics
Joshua Alford	ACT	20	1st
Michael Anderson	Qld	28	3rd
Jesse Aungles	SA	20	1st
Emily Beecroft	Vic	16	1st
Liam Bekric	SA	15	1st
Blake Cochrane	SA	25	3rd
Ellie Cole	NSW	24	3rd
Rowan Crothers	Qld	18	1st
Timothy Disken	Vic	19	1st
Maddison Elliott	NSW	17	2nd
Daniel Fox	Qld	24	2nd
Brenden Hall	Qld	22	3rd
Guy Harrison-Murray	Qld	18	1st
Timothy Hodge	NSW	15	1st
Tanya Huebner	Vic	37	2nd
Braedan Jason	Qld	17	1st
Jenna Jones	NSW	15	1st
Ahmed Kelly	Vic	24	2nd
Paige Leonhardt	NSW	15	1st
Matt Levy	NSW	29	4th
Jeremy McClure	WA	28	4th
Ashleigh McConnell	Vic	20	1st
Monique Murphy	Vic	22	1st
Lakeisha Patterson	Qld	17	1st
Rick Pendleton	Qld	31	4th
Logan Powell	Qld	17	1st
Sean Russo	NSW	25	2nd
Madeleine Scott	ACT	23	1st
Jacob Templeton	Qld	20	1st
Tiffany Thomas Kane	NSW	14	1st
Prue Watt	NSW	28	4th

== Club points scores ==
The final club point scores are below. Note: Only the top ten clubs are listed.

Overall club point score
Rank	Club	State	Points
1	St Peters Western	Qld	749.5
2	Chandler	Qld	693.5
3	USC Spartans	Qld	656.5
4	Melbourne Vicentre	Vic	610.5
5	Marion	SA	559
6	TSS Aquatic	Qld	524
7	Nunawading	Vic	490
8	Brisbane Grammar	Qld	367
9	SOPAC	NSW	354
10	Ravenswood	NSW	295

Club point score excluding MC events
Rank	Club	State	Points
1	St Peters Western	Qld	749.5
2	TSS Aquatic	Qld	524
3	Marion	SA	476
4	Chandler	Qld	465
5	Nunawading	Vic	419
6	Melbourne Vicentre	Vic	410.5
7	Brisbane Grammar	Qld	367
8	SOPAC	NSW	346
9	Commercial	Qld	282
10	USC Spartans	Qld	268

Multi class club point score
Rank	Club	State	Points
1	USC Spartans	Qld	388.5
2	Chandler	Qld	228.5
3	SLC Aquadot	NSW	220
4	Cranbrook Eastern Edge	NSW	205
5	Melbourne Vicentre	Vic	200
6	Nelson Bay	NSW	196
7	Ravenswood	NSW	170
8	Newcastle University	NSW	157
9	Lawnton	Qld	149
10	MLC Marlins	NSW	143.5

Note: Unattached swimmers in Queensland finished with 167 points.

== Broadcast ==
The morning sessions were streamed live on the website of Swimming Australia. The evening sessions were broadcast live on Channel Seven. This was the first national championships to be screen by Seven after securing the broadcast rights with Swimming Australia in September 2015. The deal is for the next five years with the option to extend for a further four years through until 2025.
