= 2015 Australian Swimming Championships =

- Host city: Sydney, New South Wales
- Date: 3–10 April
- Venue: Sydney Olympic Park Aquatic Centre
- Events: 63 (men: 32; women: 31)

The 2015 Australian Swimming Championships were held from 3 to 10 April 2015 at the Sydney Olympic Park Aquatic Centre in Sydney, New South Wales. They doubled up as the national trials for the 2015 World Aquatics Championships in Kazan, Russia, the 2015 Summer Universiade, held in Gwangju, South Korea, the 2015 IPC Swimming World Championships, held in Glasgow, Scotland and the 2015 FINA World Junior Swimming Championships, held in Singapore.

== Events ==
A total of 63 events (32 for men and 31 for women) were contested:

- Freestyle: 50, 100, 200, 400, 800, and 1,500;
- Backstroke: 50, 100 and 200;
- Breaststroke: 50, 100 and 200;
- Butterfly: 50, 100 and 200;
- Individual medley: 200 and 400;
- Relays: 4×100 free, 4×200 free; 4×100 medley

=== Schedule ===
Legend
Key	H	½	F	TF
Value	Heats	Semifinals	Final	Timed final

M = Morning session, E = Evening session

Men
Date →	Apr 3		Apr 4		Apr 5		Apr 6		Apr 7		Apr 8		Apr 9		Apr 10	
Event ↓	M	E	M	E	M	E	M	E	M	E	M	E	M	E	M	E
50 m freestyle											H	½		F		
100 m freestyle							H	½		F						
200 m freestyle			H	½		F										
400 m freestyle	H	F														
800 m freestyle					H			F								
1500 m freestyle													H			F
50 m backstroke													H	½		F
100 m backstroke			H	½		F										
200 m backstroke									H	½		F				
50 m breaststroke					H	½		F								
100 m breaststroke	H	½		F												
200 m breaststroke									H	½		F				
50 m butterfly	H	½		F												
100 m butterfly											H	½		F		
200 m butterfly					H	½		F								
200 m individual medley							H	½		F						
400 m individual medley															H	F
4×100 m freestyle relay		TF														
4×200 m freestyle relay												TF				
4×100 m medley relay																TF

Men's multiclass
Date →	Apr 3		Apr 4		Apr 5		Apr 6		Apr 7		Apr 8		Apr 9		Apr 10	
Event ↓	M	E	M	E	M	E	M	E	M	E	M	E	M	E	M	E
50 m freestyle			H	F												
100 m freestyle											H	F				
200 m freestyle									H	F						
400 m freestyle					H	F										
50 m backstroke									H	F						
100 m backstroke	H	F														
50 m breaststroke															H	F
100 m breaststroke							H	F								
50 m butterfly					H	F										
100 m butterfly															H	F
150 m individual medley														TF		
200 m individual medley													H	F		

Women
Date →	Apr 3		Apr 4		Apr 5		Apr 6		Apr 7		Apr 8		Apr 9		Apr 10	
Event ↓	M	E	M	E	M	E	M	E	M	E	M	E	M	E	M	E
50 m freestyle													H	½		F
100 m freestyle									H	½		F				
200 m freestyle					H	½		F								
400 m freestyle	H	F														
800 m freestyle											H			F		
1500 m freestyle			H			F										
50 m backstroke							H	½		F						
100 m backstroke			H	½		F										
200 m backstroke											H	½		F		
50 m breaststroke													H	½		F
100 m breaststroke			H	½		F										
200 m breaststroke									H	½		F				
50 m butterfly											H	½		F		
100 m butterfly	H	½		F												
200 m butterfly							H	½		F						
200 m individual medley	H	½		F												
400 m individual medley															H	F
4×100 m freestyle relay		TF														
4×200 m freestyle relay										TF						
4×100 m medley relay																TF

Women's multiclass
Date →	Apr 3		Apr 4		Apr 5		Apr 6		Apr 7		Apr 8		Apr 9		Apr 10	
Event ↓	M	E	M	E	M	E	M	E	M	E	M	E	M	E	M	E
50 m freestyle			H	F												
100 m freestyle											H	F				
200 m freestyle													H	F		
400 m freestyle							H	F								
50 m backstroke									H	F						
100 m backstroke	H	F														
50 m breaststroke															H	F
100 m breaststroke							H	F								
50 m butterfly					H	F										
100 m butterfly															H	F
200 m individual medley													H	F		

== Qualification criteria ==
Below are the entry qualifying times for each event that had to be achieved after 1 January 2014 in a 50m pool.

Event	Men	Women
50 m freestyle	24.30	27.20
100 m freestyle	52.50	58.10
200 m freestyle	1:55.80	2:07.20
400 m freestyle	4:07.00	4:27.00
800 m freestyle	8:37.00	9:02.00
1500 m freestyle	16:00.00	17:45.00
50 m backstroke	28.50	31.80
100 m backstroke	1:01.00	1:07.20
200 m backstroke	2:12.50	2:24.00
50 m breaststroke	31.60	36.00
100 m breaststroke	1:08.80	1:17.00
200 m breaststroke	2:29.60	2:45.00
50 m butterfly	25.80	29.50
100 m butterfly	58.00	1:05.10
200 m butterfly	2:08.80	2:23.00
200 m IM	2:13.30	2:26.50
400 m IM	4:42.00	5:05.00
4×100 m freestyle relay	3:37.00	4:09.00
4×200 m freestyle relay	8:00.00	8:45.00
4×100 m medley relay	4:05.00	4:35.00

Below are the FINA A and B qualifying times for the 2015 World Aquatics Championships for each event.

Event	Men		Women	
Event	A	B	A	B
50 m freestyle	22.25	23.03	25.23	26.11
100 m freestyle	49.39	51.12	55.05	56.98
200 m freestyle	1:48.37	1:52.16	1:58.93	2:03.09
400 m freestyle	3:50.87	3:58.95	4:12.47	4:21.31
800 m freestyle	7:57.69	8:14.41	8:35.99	8:54.05
1500 m freestyle	15:13.98	15:45.97	16:33.61	17:08.39
50 m backstroke	25.52	26.41	28.60	29.60
100 m backstroke	54.72	56.64	1:01.25	1:03.39
200 m backstroke	1:59.19	2:03.36	2:12.14	2:16.76
50 m breaststroke	27.58	28.55	31.50	32.60
100 m breaststroke	1:00.44	1:02.56	1:08.36	1:10.75
200 m breaststroke	2:11.71	2:16.32	2:28.12	2:33.30
50 m butterfly	23.53	24.35	26.54	27.47
100 m butterfly	52.52	54.36	59.18	1:01.25
200 m butterfly	1:57.37	2:01.48	2:11.14	2:15.73
200 m IM	1:59.99	2:04.19	2:13.98	2:18.67
400 m IM	4:19.21	4:28.28	4:44.50	4:54.46

Below are the qualifying times set by Swimming Australia for the 2015 World Aquatics Championships for each event.

Event	Men	Women
50 m freestyle	21.74	24.91
100 m freestyle	48.46	54.09
200 m freestyle	1:47.31	1:56.76
400 m freestyle	3:47.86	4:06.02
800 m freestyle	—N/a	8:27.41
1500 m freestyle	15:00.48	—N/a
100 m backstroke	53.81	1:00.24
200 m backstroke	1:57.37	2:09.84
100 m breaststroke	59.92	1:07.12
200 m breaststroke	2:10.01	2:24.68
100 m butterfly	51.78	58.44
200 m butterfly	1:56.10	2:07.86
200 m IM	1:58.17	2:11.21
400 m IM	4:15.81	4:37.77
4×100 m freestyle relay	3:16.96	3:40.74
4×200 m freestyle relay	7:14.87	7:58.91
4×100 m medley relay	3:36.41	4:02.80

Below are the men's entry multiclass qualifying times for each event.

Event	Classification															
Event	S16	S15	S14	S13	S12	S11	S10	S9	S8	S7	S6	S5	S4	S3	S2	S1
50 m freestyle	33.15	30.06	31.86	29.92	28.97	32.53	29.53	31.93	33.32	34.86	37.52	46.43	53.27	1:03.85	1:30.09	1:36.78
100 m freestyle	1:15.60	1:05.76	1:09.72	1:06.96	1:04.14	1:11.40	1:04.09	1:09.67	1:12.60	1:16.02	1:22.46	1:39.96	1:57.30	2:20.45	3:14.91	3:30.27
200 m freestyle	3:06.23	2:22.52	2:30.71	2:33.23	2:30.47	2:33.94	2:24.21	2:34.40	2:44.53	2:49.55	2:56.63	3:27.90	4:09.47	4:53.46	6:49.88	7:24.84
400 m freestyle	6:51.99	4:54.09	5:28.84	5:11.09	5:13.27	5:28.63	5:07.67	5:23.82	5:35.24	6:02.09	6:02.54	—N/a				
50 m backstroke	41.93	35.15	38.35	36.85	36.32	40.71	36.03	37.55	38.98	44.21	44.55	49.72	1:00.60	1:06.19	1:34.36	2:01.37
100 m backstroke	1:29.62	1:14.90	1:20.38	1:15.41	1:14.80	1:25.35	1:16.29	1:17.93	1:21.48	1:30.64	1:33.22	1:48.65	2:18.11	2:55.06	3:30.37	4:48.26
50 m butterfly	38.30	31.27	34.22	34.35	33.69	35.86	32.24	34.57	35.33	38.26	38.79	48.71	1:00.48	1:26.36	2:05.06	2:56.48
100 m butterfly	1:25.67	1:07.91	1:16.12	1:12.17	1:11.69	1:17.01	1:10.54	1:14.76	1:16.16	1:25.98	1:30.40	1:53.85	—N/a			
	SB16	SB15	SB14	SB13	SB12	SB11	—N/a	SB9	SB8	SB7	SB6	SB5	SB4	SB3	SB2	SB1
50 m breaststroke	42.88	35.87	38.16	39.52	41.54	43.71	—N/a	36.74	42.02	48.39	48.73	59.88	1:05.94	1:12.43	1:24.06	2:14.35
100 m breaststroke	1:34.72	1:15.60	1:23.68	1:21.43	1:24.99	1:28.86	—N/a	1:23.10	1:24.43	1:43.05	1:47.23	2:09.84	2:17.09	2:46.02	3:19.30	—N/a
	SM16	SM15	SM14	SM13	SM12	SM11	SM10	SM9	SM8	SM7	SM6	SM5	SM4	SM3	SM2	SM1
150 m IM	—N/a												3:27.14	4:04.57	6:29.27	8:46.51
200 m IM	3:28.38	2:33.99	2:54.02	2:46.11	2:45.19	3:00.13	2:45.43	2:48.33	2:57.55	3:16.45	3:24.33	4:00.12	—N/a			

Below are the women's entry multiclass qualifying times for each event.

Event	Classification															
Event	S16	S15	S14	S13	S12	S11	S10	S9	S8	S7	S6	S5	S4	S3	S2	S1
50 m freestyle	39.94	32.95	36.47	34.50	33.97	39.32	35.72	36.59	39.32	39.86	44.85	50.91	1:04.90	1:25.21	1:48.11	1:47.15
100 m freestyle	1:26.66	1:12.18	1:19.12	1:14.17	1:14.93	1:26.38	1:17.35	1:16.96	1:23.85	1:26.24	1:35.72	1:48.77	2:16.73	3:02.99	3:35.36	4:01.00
200 m freestyle	3:26.49	2:40.17	2:46.10	2:45.58	2:47.98	3:09.46	2:48.68	2:43.64	2:57.81	3:00.95	3:18.48	3:53.58	4:35.13	6:20.10	7:13.25	8:12.45
400 m freestyle	7:23.64	5:37.43	5:59.41	5:38.47	5:49.46	6:31.55	5:44.15	5:32.38	5:59.92	6:24.11	6:52.80	—N/a				
50 m backstroke	47.52	39.20	41.02	41.48	42.04	46.29	40.99	42.75	46.88	49.82	53.08	54.89	1:09.43	1:24.58	1:43.01	1:46.02
100 m backstroke	1:54.70	1:24.63	1:27.89	1:27.05	1:26.80	1:40.52	1:23.75	1:27.31	1:33.69	1:44.81	1:49.45	2:11.84	2:39.95	3:14.33	4:21.70	4:31.50
50 m butterfly	42.40	36.74	39.12	38.35	37.89	45.77	39.84	40.29	42.45	43.43	48.43	57.48	1:19.97	1:27.90	—N/a	
100 m butterfly	2:24.89	1:20.66	1:27.77	1:23.09	1:19.51	1:40.74	1:25.75	1:24.09	1:30.26	1:40.97	1:52.91	2:48.05	—N/a			
	SB16	SB15	SB14	SB13	SB12	SB11	—N/a	SB9	SB8	SB7	SB6	SB5	SB4	SB3	SB2	SB1
50 m breaststroke	49.51	41.92	46.38	45.89	45.02	52.43	—N/a	48.61	48.81	55.78	58.03	1:05.26	1:18.60	1:20.98	1:48.48	2:35.19
100 m breaststroke	1:55.41	1:32.59	1:42.71	1:37.17	1:36.79	1:52.76	—N/a	1:36.93	1:37.77	1:54.65	2:00.34	2:13.17	2:39.83	3:13.67	4:31.56	—N/a
	SM16	SM15	SM14	SM13	SM12	SM11	SM10	SM9	SM8	SM7	SM6	SM5	SM4	SM3	SM2	SM1
150 m IM	—N/a												3:58.16	5:12.74	8:02.98	8:02.98
200 m IM	3:55.48	3:01.25	3:13.27	3:06.66	3:09.10	3:37.16	3:09.16	3:06.25	3:19.46	3:32.21	3:58.43	4:34.69	—N/a			

Below are the IPC minimum qualification standard (MQS) and minimum entry times (MET) for the 2015 IPC Swimming World Championships for each event.

Event	Class	Men		Women	
Event	Class	MQS	MET	MQS	MET
50 m freestyle	S3	1:22.00	1:27.00	—N/a	
50 m freestyle	S4	52.00	55.00	1:17.00	1:22.00
50 m freestyle	S5	41.00	44.00	50.00	53.00
50 m freestyle	S6	34.00	36.00	39.00	41.00
50 m freestyle	S7	32.00	34.00	38.00	40.00
50 m freestyle	S8	29.00	31.00	37.00	39.00
50 m freestyle	S9	27.00	29.00	31.00	33.00
50 m freestyle	S10	26.00	28.00	30.00	32.00
50 m freestyle	S11	31.00	32.00	36.00	39.00
50 m freestyle	S12	26.00	27.00	33.00	35.00
50 m freestyle	S13	27.00	28.00	30.00	32.00
100 m freestyle	S3	—N/a		3:02.00	3:11.00
100 m freestyle	S4	2:08.00	2:14.00	—N/a	
100 m freestyle	S5	1:28.00	1:33.00	1:46.00	1:51.00
100 m freestyle	S6	1:17.00	1:21.00	1:28.00	1:32.00
100 m freestyle	S7	1:10.00	1:13.00	1:21.00	1:26.00
100 m freestyle	S8	1:04.00	1:07.00	1:20.00	1:24.00
100 m freestyle	S9	59.00	1:02.00	1:08.00	1:12.00
100 m freestyle	S10	57.00	59.00	1:06.00	1:09.00
100 m freestyle	S11	1:09.00	1:13.00	1:28.00	1:32.00
100 m freestyle	S13	1:00.00	1:02.00	1:09.00	1:13.00
200 m freestyle	S2	5:27.00	5:43.00	—N/a	
200 m freestyle	S3	6:45.00	7:05.00	—N/a	
200 m freestyle	S4	4:48.00	5:03.00	—N/a	
200 m freestyle	S5	3:18.00	3:27.00	4:22.00	4:36.00
200 m freestyle	S14	2:05.00	2:11.00	2:22.00	2:30.00

Event	Class	Men		Women	
Event	Class	MQS	MET	MQS	MET
400 m freestyle	S6	5:58.00	6:12.00	6:42.00	6:58.00
400 m freestyle	S7	5:38.00	5:52.00	6:20.00	6:35.00
400 m freestyle	S8	4:57.00	5:09.00	5:51.00	6:05.00
400 m freestyle	S9	4:41.00	4:52.00	5:19.00	5:32.00
400 m freestyle	S10	4:28.00	4:39.00	5:01.00	5:13.00
400 m freestyle	S11	6:59.00	7:16.00	7:35.00	7:53.00
400 m freestyle	S13	4:55.00	5:06.00	5:47.00	6:00.00
50 m backstroke	S1	1:43.00	1:47.00	—N/a	
50 m backstroke	S2	1:45.00	1:52.00	1:24.00	1:28.00
50 m backstroke	S3	1:19.00	1:24.00	1:31.00	1:37.00
50 m backstroke	S4	59.00	1:02.00	1:17.00	1:21.00
50 m backstroke	S5	48.00	51.00	59.00	1:03.00
100 m backstroke	S1	3:47.00	4:01.00	—N/a	
100 m backstroke	S2	2:50.00	3:00.00	2:59.00	3:08.00
100 m backstroke	S6	1:36.00	1:41.00	1:47.00	1:52.00
100 m backstroke	S7	1:24.00	1:28.00	1:41.00	1:46.00
100 m backstroke	S8	1:17.00	1:21.00	1:33.00	1:37.00
100 m backstroke	S9	1:10.00	1:13.00	1:20.00	1:24.00
100 m backstroke	S10	1:06.00	1:09.00	1:16.00	1:19.00
100 m backstroke	S11	1:31.00	1:35.00	1:59.00	2:04.00
100 m backstroke	S12	1:19.00	1:23.00	1:57.00	2:03.00
100 m backstroke	S13	1:16.00	1:20.00	1:30.00	1:35.00
100 m backstroke	S14	1:07.00	1:17.00	1:10.00	1:21.00
50 m breaststroke	SB2	1:35.00	1:39.00	—N/a	
50 m breaststroke	SB3	1:02.00	1:05.00	2:44.00	2:52.00

Event	Class	Men		Women	
Event	Class	MQS	MET	MQS	MET
100 m breaststroke	SB4	2:07.00	2:13.00	2:34.00	2:42.00
100 m breaststroke	SB5	1:55.00	2:00.00	2:14.00	2:21.00
100 m breaststroke	SB6	1:38.00	1:43.00	1:58.00	2:03.00
100 m breaststroke	SB7	1:32.00	1:36.00	1:59.00	2:04.00
100 m breaststroke	SB8	1:21.00	1:25.00	1:37.00	1:42.00
100 m breaststroke	SB9	1:16.00	1:20.00	1:26.00	1:30.00
100 m breaststroke	SB11	1:30.00	1:34.00	2:06.00	2:12.00
100 m breaststroke	SB12	1:22.00	1:26.00	—N/a	
100 m breaststroke	SB13	1:27.00	1:32.00	1:36.00	1:40.00
100 m breaststroke	SB14	1:14.00	1:18.00	1:26.00	1:30.00
50 m butterfly	S5	49.00	52.00	1:10.00	1:14.00
50 m butterfly	S6	39.00	42.00	45.00	47.00
50 m butterfly	S7	35.00	37.00	47.00	50.00
100 m butterfly	S8	1:10.00	1:13.00	1:38.00	1:43.00
100 m butterfly	S9	1:06.00	1:09.00	1:18.00	1:22.00
100 m butterfly	S10	1:02.00	1:06.00	1:17.00	1:21.00
100 m butterfly	S11	1:37.00	1:42.00	—N/a	
100 m butterfly	S13	1:17.00	1:20.00	1:36.00	1:41.00
150 m IM	SM3	3:46.00	3:58.00	—N/a	
150 m IM	SM4	3:33.00	3:44.00	4:38.00	4:52.00
200 m IM	SM5	—N/a		4:55.00	5:09.00
200 m IM	SM6	3:18.00	3:28.00	3:39.00	3:50.00
200 m IM	SM7	3:02.00	3:11.00	3:49.00	4:00.00
200 m IM	SM8	2:41.00	2:49.00	3:27.00	3:38.00
200 m IM	SM9	2:30.00	2:37.00	2:52.00	3:01.00
200 m IM	SM10	2:21.00	2:28.00	2:42.00	2:51.00
200 m IM	SM11	3:10.00	3:19.00	3:58.00	4:10.00
200 m IM	SM13	2:45.00	2:53.00	2:58.00	3:07.00
200 m IM	SM14	2:22.00	2:29.00	2:45.00	2:53.00

== Medal winners ==
=== Men's events ===
Event	Gold		Silver		Bronze	
50 m freestyle	James Magnussen; Ravenswood (NSW)	21.98	Cameron McEvoy; Palm Beach Currumbin (Qld)	22.03	Matthew Abood; Sydney University (NSW)	22.30
100 m freestyle	Cameron McEvoy; Palm Beach Currumbin (Qld)	48.06	James Magnussen; Ravenswood (NSW)	48.18	Tommaso D'Orsogna; Commercial (Qld)	48.54
200 m freestyle	Cameron McEvoy; Palm Beach Currumbin (Qld)	1:45.94	David McKeon; Chandler (Qld)	1:46.33	Thomas Fraser-Holmes; Miami (Qld)	1:46.83
400 m freestyle	Mack Horton; Melbourne Vicentre (Vic)	3:42.84	David McKeon; Chandler (Qld)	3:44.28	Grant Hackett; Miami (Qld)	3:46.53
800 m freestyle	Mack Horton; Melbourne Vicentre (Vic)	7:51.85	George O'Brien; Bond (Qld)	7:58.73	Jack McLoughlin; Nudgee Brothers (Qld)	8:01.51
1500 m freestyle	Mack Horton; Melbourne Vicentre (Vic)	14:44.09; ACR	Jordan Harrison; Miami (Qld)	15:14.96	Jack McLoughlin; Nudgee Brothers (Qld)	15:16.96
50 m backstroke	Ben Treffers; Burley Griffin (ACT)	24.75	Bobby Hurley; Ravenswood (NSW)	25.31	Mitch Larkin; St Peters Western (Qld)	25.32
100 m backstroke	Mitch Larkin; St Peters Western (Qld)	53.10	Ben Treffers; Burley Griffin (ACT)	53.77	Joshua Beaver; Tigersharks (Vic)	53.82
200 m backstroke	Mitch Larkin; St Peters Western (Qld)	1:55.52	Joshua Beaver; Tigersharks (Vic)	1:56.48	Ashley Delaney; Nunawading (Vic)	1:58.84
50 m breaststroke	Christian Sprenger; Commercial (Qld)	27.28	Tommy Sucipto; Leisurepark Lazers (WA)	27.71	Jake Packard; Indooroopilly (Qld)	27.84
100 m breaststroke	Jake Packard; Indooroopilly (Qld)	1:00.37	Christian Sprenger; Commercial (Qld)	1:00.67	Tommy Sucipto; Leisurepark Lazers (WA)	1:01.13
200 m breaststroke	Nicholas Schafer; River City Rapids (Qld)	2:12.47	Lennard Bremer; Westside Christchurch (WA)	1:00.67	Joshua Tierney; TSS Aquatic (Qld)	2:13.66
50 m butterfly	Jayden Hadler; Commercial (Qld)	23.64	Ryan Pini; Papua New Guinea	23.79	Daniel Lester; Lawton (Qld)	23.85
100 m butterfly	Tommaso D'Orsogna; Commercial (Qld)	51.92	Jayden Hadler; Commercial (Qld)	51.96	David Morgan; TSS Aquatic (Qld)	52.03
200 m butterfly	Grant Irvine; St Peters Western (Qld)	1:55.98	David Morgan; TSS Aquatic (Qld)	1:55.99	Keiran Qaium; Sydney University (NSW)	1:57.85
200 m IM	Daniel Tranter; Sydney University (NSW)	1:58.73	Justin James; Mackay (Qld)	1:58.86	Thomas Fraser-Holmes; Miami (Qld)	1:59.55
400 m IM	Thomas Fraser-Holmes; Miami (Qld)	4:13.98	Jared Gilliland; Nudgee Brothers (Qld)	4:16.58	Travis Mahoney; Nunawading (Vic)	4:16.90
4×100 m freestyle relay	Sydney University A (NSW); Andrew Abood (51.33); Benjamin Lindsay (50.22); Te Haumi Maxwell (50.32); Matthew Abood (49.41)	3:21.28	Melbourne Vicentre A (Vic); Layne Tankard (51.42); Jack Gerrard (49.83); Cody Smith (51.09); Jorden Merrilees (49.85)	3:22.19	Lane Cove A (NSW); Chris Warren (52.08); Daniel Arnamnart (50.40); Andrew Smith (52.08); Daniel Jones (52.18)	3:26.74
4×200 m freestyle relay	Miami A (Qld); Daniel Smith (1:47.30); Thomas Fraser-Holmes (1:46.42); Jordan Harrison (1:49.66); Grant Hackett (1:46.86)	7:10.24; Club	Melbourne Vicentre A (Vic); Jorden Merrilees (1:50.89); Mitchell Davenport-Wright (1:51.75); Theodoros Benehoutsos (1:51.24); Jack Kelly (1:55.98)	7:29.86	Nunawading A (Vic); Shane Ashbury (1:51.74); Liam Fisk (1:55.56); Ashley Delaney (1:50.93); Ryan Pinchbeck (1:55.56)	7:33.79
4×100 m medley relay	Marion A (SA); Ben Edmonds (56.09); Joshua Palmer (1:01.64); Kyle Chalmers (53.24); Hayden Lewis (50.72)	3:41.69	Trinity Grammar A (NSW); James Traiforos (55.85); Matthew Treloar (1:02.43); Alston Jeroff (54.76); Kenneth To (48.68)	3:41.72	Nudgee Brothers A (Qld); Robert Gerlach (55.79); Buster Sykes (1:01.65); Jared Gilliland (55.29); Jack McLaughlin (50.75)	3:43.48

=== Men's multiclass events ===
Event	Gold		Silver		Bronze	
50 m freestyle	Joshua Alford (S14); Tuggeranong Vikings (ACT)	25.25 (919)	Mitchell Kilduff (S14); Menai (NSW)	25.27 (917)	Matt Levy (S7); Cranbrook Eastern Edge (NSW)	28.57 (908)
100 m freestyle	Daniel Fox (S14); Chandler (Qld)	53.53 (1039) WR	Joshua Alford (S14); Tuggeranong Vikings (ACT)	55.79 (918)	Matt Levy (S7); Cranbrook Eastern Edge (NSW)	1:02.67 (893)
200 m freestyle	Daniel Fox (S14); Chandler (Qld)	1:59.32 (947)	Brenden Hall (S9); Lawnton (Qld)	2:01.34 (944)	Joshua Alford (S14); Tuggeranong Vikings (ACT)	2:01.65 (893)
400 m freestyle	Brenden Hall (S9); Lawnton (Qld)	4:10.90 (988)	Joshua Alford (S14); Tuggeranong Vikings (ACT)	4:20.90 (940)	Liam Schluter (S14); Kawana Waters (Qld)	4:23.81 (909)
50 m backstroke	Timothy Disken (S9); PLC Aquatic (Vic)	30.75 (910)	Michael Anderson (S10); Flinders (Qld)	29.13 (925)	Timothy Hodge (S9); Unattached NSW	31.16 (875)
100 m backstroke	Michael Anderson (S10); Flinders (Qld)	1:01.58 (925)	Daniel Fox (S14); Chandler (Qld)	1:03.94 (845)	Brenden Hall (S9); Lawnton (Qld)	1:05.61 (834)
50 m breaststroke	Matt Levy (SB7); Cranbrook Eastern Edge (NSW)	35.70 (1037) WR	Blake Cochrane (SB7); Southern Cross (Qld)	36.14 (999)	Richard Eliason (SB14); Ginninderra (ACT)	31.15 (919)
100 m breaststroke	Blake Cochrane (SB7); Southern Cross (Qld)	1:17.26 (1022) WR	Ahmed Kelly (SB3); Melbourne Vicentre (Vic)	1:53.01 (936)	Matt Levy (SB6); Cranbrook Eastern Edge (NSW)	1:20.71 (897)
50 m butterfly	Mitchell Kilduff (S14); Menai (NSW)	27.09 (1000) =WR	Daniel Fox (S14); Chandler (Qld)	27.26 (981)	Tim Antalfy (S13); Hunters Hill (NSW)	25.41 (900)
100 m butterfly	Mitchell Kilduff (S14); Menai (NSW)	1:00.44 (911)	Daniel Fox (S14); Chandler (Qld)	1:00.97 (888)	Tim Antalfy (S13); Hunters Hill (NSW)	57.23 (884)
150 m IM	Grant Patterson (SM3); Cairns Central (Qld)	3:10.37 (636)	Ahmed Kelly (SM4); Melbourne Vicentre (Vic)	3:01.50 (520)	None awarded	
200 m IM	Matt Levy (SM7); Cranbrook Eastern Edge (NSW)	2:37.13 (926)	Rick Pendleton (SM10); Flinders (Qld)	2:14.59 (901)	Jeremy Tidy (SM10); Nunawading (Vic)	2:17.55 (844)

=== Women's events ===
Event	Gold		Silver		Bronze	
50 m freestyle	Bronte Campbell; Commercial (Qld)	24.19	Cate Campbell; Commercial (Qld)	24.33	Melanie Wright; St Peters Western (Qld)	24.63
100 m freestyle	Cate Campbell; Commercial (Qld)	52.69	Bronte Campbell; Commercial (Qld)	53.04	Melanie Wright; St Peters Western (Qld)	53.50
200 m freestyle	Emma McKeon; Chandler (Qld)	1:55.88	Kylie Palmer; Indooroopilly (Qld)	1:56.68	Brittany Elmslie; St Peters Western (Qld)	1:56.91
400 m freestyle	Jessica Ashwood; Chandler (Qld)	4:05.58	Leah Neale; Indooroopilly (Qld)	4:06.84	Tamsin Cook; West Coast (WA)	4:07.14
800 m freestyle	Jessica Ashwood; Chandler (Qld)	8:26.09	Kiah Melverton; TSS Aquatic (Qld)	8:31.01	Tamsin Cook; West Coast (WA)	8:34.31
1500 m freestyle	Chelsea Gubecka; Kawana Waters (Qld)	16:23.95	Kareena Lee; Mountain Creek (Qld)	16:36.10	Phoebe Hines; Mountain Creek (Qld)	16:54.00
50 m backstroke	Emily Seebohm; Nudgee Brothers (Qld)	27.47; CR, OR, ACR	Madison Wilson; St Peters Western (Qld)	27.90	Minna Atherton; Brisbane Grammar (Qld)	28.32
100 m backstroke	Emily Seebohm; Nudgee Brothers (Qld)	58.91	Madison Wilson; St Peters Western (Qld)	58.94	Hayley Baker; Melbourne Vicentre (Vic)	1:00.23
200 m backstroke	Emily Seebohm; Nudgee Brothers (Qld)	2:06.69	Hayley Baker; Melbourne Vicentre (Vic)	2:08.21	Madison Wilson; St Peters Western (Qld)	2:08.57
50 m breaststroke	Jennie Johansson; Sweden	30.68	Leiston Pickett; Southport Olympic (Qld)	30.82	Sally Hunter; Marion (SA)	30.97
100 m breaststroke	Taylor McKeown; Indooroopilly (Qld)	1:07.07	Lorna Tonks; Indooroopilly (Qld)	1:07.46	Sally Hunter; Marion (SA)	1:07.63
200 m breaststroke	Tessa Wallace; Pelican Waters Caloundra (Qld)	2:23.34	Taylor McKeown; Indooroopilly (Qld)	2:23.77	Sally Hunter; Marion (SA)	2:24.38
50 m butterfly	Brittany Elmslie; St Peters Western (Qld)	26.07	Emma McKeon; Chandler (Qld)	26.15	Marieke D'Cruz; SOPAC (NSW)	26.38
100 m butterfly	Emma McKeon; Chandler (Qld)	57.31	Madeline Groves; St Peters Western (Qld)	57.44	Alicia Coutts; Redlands (Qld)	57.77
200 m butterfly	Madeline Groves; St Peters Western (Qld)	2:05.41; ACR	Brianna Throssell; Perth City (WA)	2:07.29	Keryn McMaster; Waterworx (Qld)	2:12.07
200 m IM	Emily Seebohm; Nudgee Brothers (Qld)	2:11.37	Kotuku Ngawati; Melbourne Vicentre (Vic)	2:11.96	Keryn McMaster; Waterworx (Qld)	2:12.71
400 m IM	Keryn McMaster; Waterworx (Qld)	4:37.56	Tessa Wallace; Pelican Waters Caloundra (Qld)	4:38.13	Tianni Gilmour; Pelican Waters Caloundra (Qld)	4:43.33
4×100 m freestyle relay	Carlile A (NSW); Leanne Wright (56.71); Ami Matsuo (54.41); Emily Washer (59.03); Jessie Quinn (58.03)	3:48.18	Marion A (SA); Ellysia Oldsen (58.32); Ella Bond (58.50); Zoe Williams (57.48); Sally Hunter (55.28)	3:49.58	Ravenswood A (NSW); Amy Van Dongen (57.79); Alicia Walker (58.14); Emily Waddington (57.25); Clare Robertson (56.81)	3:49.99
4×200 m freestyle relay	Melbourne Vicentre A (Vic); Kotuku Ngawati (2:01.88); Emily Moreton (2:06.32); Molly Batchelor (2:05.42); Elyse Woods (2:04.90)	8:18.52	Ravenswood A (NSW); Emily Waddington (2:06.64); Amy Van Dongen (2:04.31); Olivia Adams (2:04.80); Clare Robertson (2:04.01)	8:19.76	Nunawading A (Vic); Katherine Brooks (2:09.32); Nerice Smith (2:08.18); Evelyn Boldt (2:11.30); Mikayla Smith (2:09.83)	8:38.63
4×100 m medley relay	Melbourne Vicentre A (Vic); Hayley Baker (1:00.92); Jenna Strauch (1:13.46); Christina Licciardi (1:00.42); Kotuku Ngawati (55.76)	4:10.56	Nunawading A (Vic); Shani Burleigh (1:02.90); Jessica Hansen (1:07.92); Mikayla Smith (1:03.63); Libby Forbes (57.22)	4:11.67	Ravenswood A (NSW); Clare Robertson (1:06.32); Abbey Harkin (1:13.07); Emily Waddington (1:01.09); Amy Van Dongen (56.56)	4:17.04

=== Women's multiclass events ===
Event	Gold		Silver		Bronze	
50 m freestyle	Ellie Cole (S9); Castle Hill RSL (NSW)	29.39 (965)	Tiffany Thomas Kane (S6); Ravenswood (NSW)	35.48 (941)	Lakeisha Patterson (S8); Kawana Waters (Qld)	30.83 (933)
100 m freestyle	Taylor Corry (S14); Nelson Bay (NSW)	1:01.72 (952)	Jacqueline Freney (S7); Richmond Valley (NSW)	1:09.58 (935)	Maddison Elliott (S8); Newcastle University (NSW)	1:06.84 (933)
200 m freestyle	Maddison Elliott (S8); Newcastle University (NSW)	2:28.12 (865)	Taylor Corry (S14); Nelson Bay (NSW)	2:15.19 (819)	Teneale Houghton (S15); Liverpool (NSW)	2:17.86 (784)
400 m freestyle	Jacqueline Freney (S7); Richmond Valley (NSW)	5:03.15 (960)	Monique Murphy (S10); Melbourne Vicentre (Vic)	4:46.24 (866)	Jade Lucy (S14); SLC Aquadot (NSW)	4:59.73 (855)
50 m backstroke	Maddison Elliott (S8); Newcastle University (NSW)	36.65 (1033) WR	Lakeisha Patterson (S8); Kawana Waters (Qld)	38.50 (891)	Ashleigh McConnell (S9); Melbourne Vicentre (Vic)	35.79 (830)
100 m backstroke	Ellie Cole (S9); Castle Hill RSL (NSW)	1:10.81 (937)	Taylor Corry (S14); Nelson Bay (NSW)	1:09.07 (901)	Jacqueline Freney (S7); Richmond Valley (NSW)	1:27.53 (809)
50 m breaststroke	Tiffany Thomas Kane (SB6); Ravenswood (NSW)	44.50 (1027) WR	Jenna Jones (SB13); Auburn (NSW)	38.77 (819)	Paige Leonhardt (SB14); Unattached NSW	39.71 (749)
100 m breaststroke	Prue Watt (SB13); Cranbrook Eastern Edge (NSW)	1:20.97 (864)	Madeleine Scott (SB9); Leisurepark Lazers (WA)	1:21.68 (835)	Tanya Huebner (SB6); Melbourne Vicentre (Vic)	1:42.45 (810)
50 m butterfly	Madeleine Scott (S9); Leisurepark Lazers (WA)	31.76 (1013) WR	Emily Beecroft (S9); Traralgon (Vic)	32.14 (978)	Maddison Elliott (S8); Newcastle University (NSW)	33.65 (915)
100 m butterfly	Madeleine Scott (S9); Leisurepark Lazers (WA)	1:11.17 (825)	Emily Beecroft (S9); Traralgon (Vic)	1:13.44 (751)	Maddison Elliott (S8); Newcastle University (NSW)	1:16.15 (750)
200 m IM	Teigan Van Roosmalen (SM13); Mingara (NSW)	2:42.57 (783)	Madeleine Scott (SM9); Leisurepark Lazers (WA)	2:40.45 (782)	Taylor Corry (SM14); Nelson Bay (NSW)	2:36.76 (778)

Legend: WR – World record; WJR – World Junior record; CR – Commonwealth record; OR – Oceanian record; AR – Australian record; ACR – Australian All Comers record; Club – Australian Club record
