= Swimming at the 2004 Summer Paralympics – Men's 100 metre backstroke S12 =

Men's 100m Backstroke S12 at the XII Paralympic Games
- Paralympic Swimming
- Venue: Olympic Aquatic Centre
- Dates: 25 September 2004
- Competitors: 13 from 7 nations
- Winning time: 1:02.75

Medalists
1st place, gold medalist(s)		Raman Makarau	Belarus
2nd place, silver medalist(s)		Sergiy Klippert	Ukraine
3rd place, bronze medalist(s)		Yoshikazu Sakai	Japan

The Men's 100 metre backstroke S12 swimming event at the 2004 Summer Paralympics was competed on 25 September. It was won by Raman Makarau, representing Belarus.

== 1st round ==
Qualified for next round

Heat 1

25 Sept. 2004, morning session

Rank	Athlete	Time	Notes
1	Dmytro Aleksyeyev (UKR)	1:06.29	
2	Jeremy McClure (AUS)	1:07.85	
3	Emmanuel Provost (FRA)	1:09.82	
4	Sergei Punko (BLR)	1:10.34	
5	Alessandro Serpico (ITA)	1:10.94	
6	Dmitri Kravtsevich (BLR)	1:15.76	

Heat 2

25 Sept. 2004, morning session

Rank	Athlete	Time	Notes
1	Sergiy Klippert (UKR)	1:04.88	
2	Raman Makarau (BLR)	1:05.07	
3	Yoshikazu Sakai (JPN)	1:06.55	
4	Albert Gelis (ESP)	1:07.38	
5	Enrique Floriano (ESP)	1:08.36	
6	Israel Oliver (ESP)	1:15.24	
7	Christophe Deteix (FRA)	1:28.80	

== Final round ==
25 Sept. 2004, evening session

Rank	Athlete	Time	Notes
1st place, gold medalist(s)	Raman Makarau (BLR)	1:02.75	PR
2nd place, silver medalist(s)	Sergiy Klippert (UKR)	1:04.01	
3rd place, bronze medalist(s)	Yoshikazu Sakai (JPN)	1:04.99	
4	Dmytro Aleksyeyev (UKR)	1:05.01	
5	Albert Gelis (ESP)	1:05.82	
6	Jeremy McClure (AUS)	1:08.12	
7	Enrique Floriano (ESP)	1:09.32	
8	Emmanuel Provost (FRA)	1:09.36	
