= Joshua Alford =

Australian Paralympic swimmer

Josh Alford
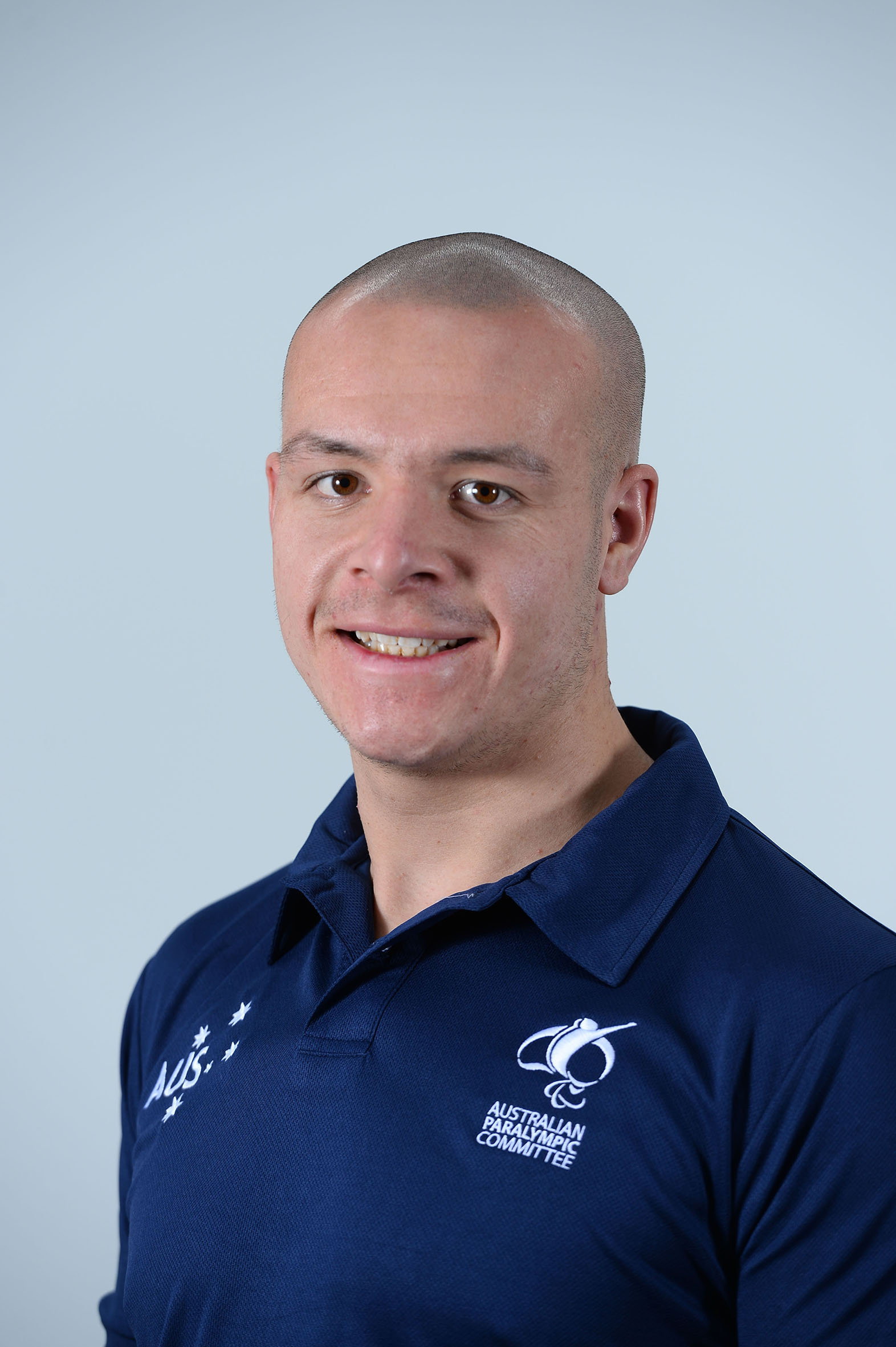
- Australian Paralympic 2016 team portrait

Personal information
- Full name: Joshua Alford
- Nationality: Australia
- Born: 25 May 1995 (age 31) Canberra, Australian Capital Territory

Sport
- Sport: Swimming
- Strokes: Backstroke, Freestyle
- Classifications: S14
- Club: Tuggernong Vikings Swim Club
- Coach: Yuriy Vdovychenko

Joshua Alford (born 25 May 1995) is an Australian Paralympic swimmer. He competed in the 2014 Commonwealth Games, placing sixth in the S14 200m Freestyle final. Alford represented Australia at the 2016 Rio Paralympics after a strong performance at the 2016 Australian Swimming Championships.

== Personal ==
Alford was born in Canberra to Lorraine and Bob Alford but raised in Cooma, where he began swimming as a three-year-old for the Cooma Swimming Club.

Alford attended Monaro High School in Cooma. At present he lives in Bruce, Canberra, where he trains at the Swimming Australia National Training Centre with coach Yuriy Vdovychenko. He is still a loyal a loyal member of the Tuggeranong Vikings Swim Club, being previously coached by David Murphy. After swimming, he would like to join the police force to train police dogs.

== Swimming ==
Alford competes in the S14 classification for swimmers with an intellectual disability.

In 2013 Alford won eight gold medals whilst competing for the NSW All Schools team at the Australian School Sports Championships, with five of those wins resulting in Australian Age multi-class records.

Alford started swimming professionally in 2014, competing at the 2014 Australian Swimming Championships where he set personal best times in the 50m, 100m, 200m and 400m Freestyle races, as well as in the 50m Backstroke- he subsequently made the finals in all five events. Alford was selected to compete for Australia at the 2014 Commonwealth Games where he made a strong first international showing, placing 6th in the S14 200m Freestyle final.

He was selected to compete at the 2015 INAS Global Games -a competition for athletes with intellectual disabilities- in Ecuador, where he won Gold in the 100m Freestyle and Silver in the 50m Freestyle. At the 2015 Australian Swimming Championships he won gold in the 50m Freestyle Multi-Class final with a time of 25.25. He won silver in the 100m and 400m Freestyle, and received bronze in the 200m Freestyle.

Alford performed well at the 2016 Australian Swimming Championships, placing 3rd in the Men's 50m Freestyle Multi-Class; 2nd in the 100m Freestyle; and 3rd in the 200m Freestyle. Due to his strong performance at the meet, he was selected as part of Australia's 30-man squad for the 2016 Rio Paralympics.

At the 2016 Rio Paralympics Games, he competed in three events. He finished eighth in the final of Men's 100m Backstroke, however didn't progress to the finals in Men's 200m Freestyle S14 and Men's 200m Individual Medley SM14.

He aims to represent Australia at the 2019 INAS Global Games in Brisbane.

== Recognition ==
- Most Outstanding Athlete with a Disability for a South Coast secondary student award in 2013 whilst at Monaro High School.
- Cooma- Monaro's young sportsperson of the year in 2013.
- NSW Combined High Schools State Blue Award for swimming AWD (athletes with disabilities).
