= Canberra International Sports & Aquatic Centre =

Sport centre in Canberra, Australia

Canberra International Sports and Aquatic Centre
- CISAC
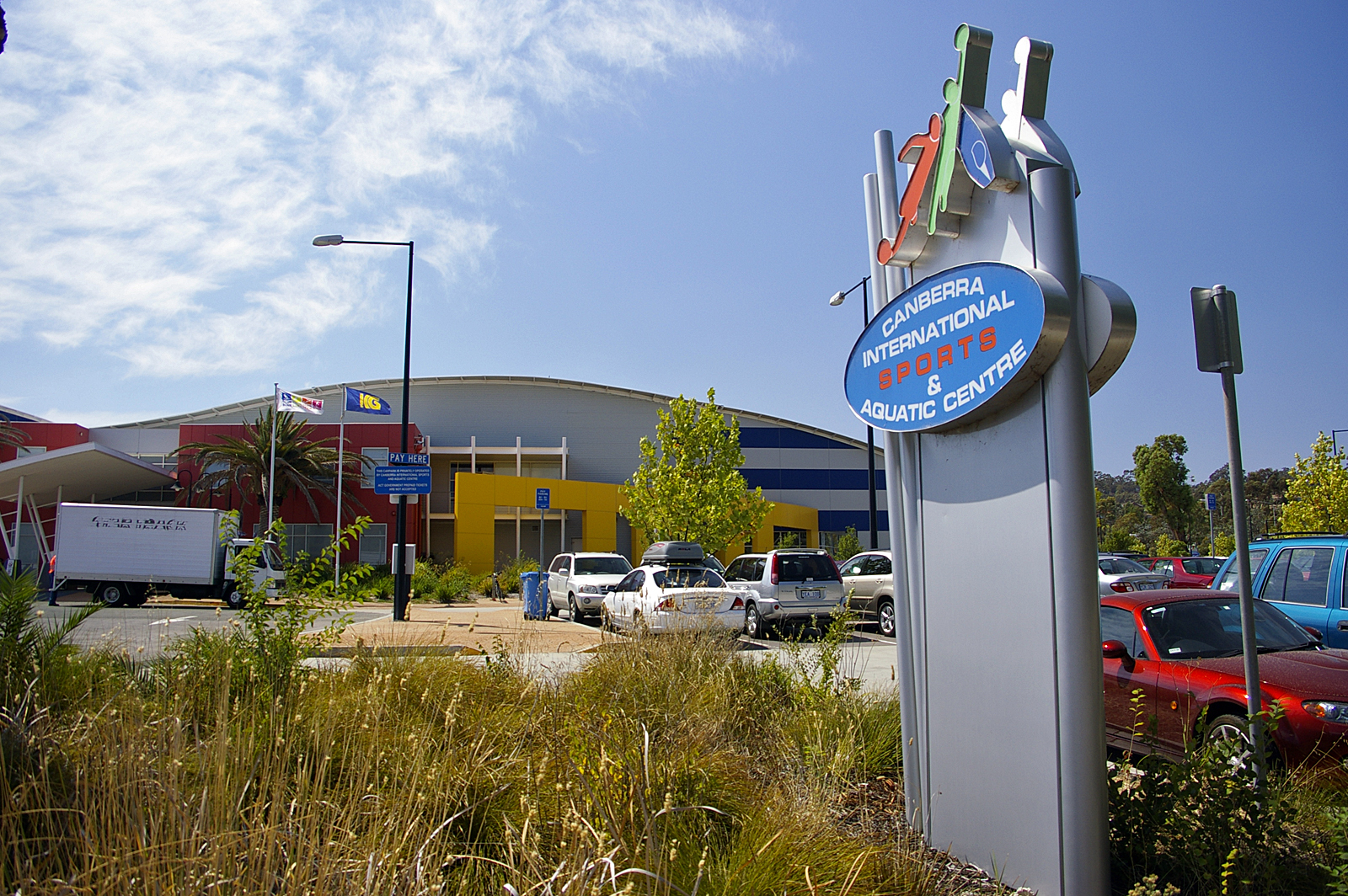
- Canberra International Sports & Aquatic Centre
- Interactive map of Canberra International Sports and Aquatic Centre
- Location: Bruce, Australian Capital Territory
- Coordinates: 35°14′30″S 149°04′29″E
- Owner: Sports Centres Australia Pty Limited (SCA)

Construction
- Opened: 12 January 2004

Canberra International Sports and Aquatic Centre (CISAC) is a privately owned sport centre located in Bruce, a suburb of Canberra, Australia. CISAC is home to the CISAC swim academy and the Ginninderra Marlins swimming club.

CISAC is one of the largest multi-tenancy health and leisure facilities in Australia. Located onsite are two health clubs, aquatic facilities, a hydrotherapy pool, medical services, scuba diving training, child care, discount health and fitness supplies, a hair salon, and cafe. It previously had a day spa called Club MMM, but this closed in 2019 The hydrotherapy pool is accessible with a ramp entry, and underwater wheelchairs. It is 34 °C and 1.6M deep.

== Overview ==
Over 1,000,000 people annually visit CISAC and over 7,000 call it home to their health and fitness, swimming and learn to swim membership. CISAC is home to the Ginninderra Swim Club, with over 100 people training there daily during mornings and during the evenings.

Safety improvements were made at the pool complex after a two-year-old boy drowned in 2005. Later in March 2013 CISAC recorded a death of a two-year-old girl after visiting a swimming pool. The death was not considered suspicious.

== See also ==
- Anastasia's Pool
