= Georgia Bohl =

Australian swimmer (born 1997)

Personal information
- Nickname: Georgie
- National team: Australia / Malta
- Born: 11 April 1997 (age 29) Auchenflower, Queensland
- Height: 1.66 m (5 ft 5 in)
- Weight: 53 kg (117 lb)

Sport
- Sport: Swimming
- Strokes: Breaststroke
- Club: St Peters Western
- Coach: Michael Bohl
Medal record
Representing Australia
Commonwealth Games
Gold medal – first place	2018 Gold Coast	4×100 m medley
Bronze medal – third place	2018 Gold Coast	100 m breaststroke

Georgia Bohl (born 11 April 1997) is a former Australian breaststroke swimmer. In 2016, she qualified for her first Olympic Games.

== Career ==
In November 2015, at the Australian short course championships, Bohl, aged 18, won her first national title in the 100 metre breaststroke with the fourth fastest time ever by an Australian: 1:04.65. On the final night of the meet, she took out her second title in the 50 metre breaststroke with a time of 30.03 seconds. In the 200 metre event, she won the bronze medal, finishing behind Sally Hunter and Taylor McKeown. The final meet of the event saw Bohl and her St Peters Western teammates Madison Wilson, Madeline Groves, Bronte Barratt take out the 4 × 100 metre medley club relay in a new all-comers, club record and championship record time of 3:55.38.

Off the back these results, Bohl was named in the 2016 Perth Aquatic Super Series Roster in December. At the Super Series event contested between the Australians, Japan and China in February 2016, Bohl finished second in both the 100 and 200 breaststroke events, clocking a personal best time of 1:06.63 in 100. In the 4 × 50 metre medley relay, Bohl with Emily Seebohm, Emma McKeon and Cate Campbell won gold in 1:48.50.

In April 2016, at the national championships she won her first long course national title in the 100 metre breaststroke event. Setting a new personal best time of 1:06.12, she easily swam under the required time of 1:07.11 to qualify for her first Olympics. She also won the 50 metre breaststroke, a non-Olympic event, in 30.58 seconds – the second fastest time of 2016. In the 200 metre breaststroke, she finished second behind Taylor McKeown in 2:23.95, narrowly missing the qualifying time by 0.89 seconds. To finish the meet, the St Peters Western foursome of Wilson, Bohl, Groves and McKeon won the 4 × 100 metre medley club relay in new club record time of 3:57.34.

At the 2016 Summer Olympics, Bohl represented Australia in both the 100m breastroke & 4x100m medley relay.

At the end of 2021, Bohl announced her retirement from competitive swimming.

== Personal life ==
Coached by her father Michael Bohl at the St Peter Western club since 2010, she attended Wilston State School and St Peters Lutheran College in Indooroopilly.
