= Swimming at the 2018 Commonwealth Games – Women's 100 metre breaststroke =

Women's 100 metre breaststroke at the 2018 Commonwealth Games
- Venue: Gold Coast Aquatic Centre
- Dates: 8 April (heats, semifinals); 9 April (final)
- Competitors: 26 from 15 nations
- Winning time: 1:06.41

Medalists
gold medal	Tatjana Schoenmaker	South Africa
silver medal	Kierra Smith	Canada
bronze medal	Georgia Bohl	Australia

The women's 100 metre breaststroke event at the 2018 Commonwealth Games was held on 8 and 9 April at the Gold Coast Aquatic Centre.

== Records ==
Prior to this competition, the existing world, Commonwealth and Games records were as follows:

World record	Lilly King (USA)	1:04.13	Budapest, Hungary	25 July 2017
Commonwealth record	Leisel Jones (AUS)	1:05.09	Melbourne, Australia	20 March 2006
Games record	Leisel Jones (AUS)	1:05.09	Melbourne, Australia	20 March 2006

== Results ==
=== Heats ===
The heats were held on 8 April at 11:47.

Rank	Heat	Lane	Name	Nationality	Time	Notes
1	3	3	Georgia Bohl	Australia	1:07.40	Q
2	4	3	Tatjana Schoenmaker	South Africa	1:07.69	Q
3	2	3	Leiston Pickett	Australia	1:07.72	Q
4	4	4	Kierra Smith	Canada	1:07.81	Q
5	3	3	Faith Knelson	Canada	1:08.50	Q
6	2	4	Jessica Hansen	Australia	1:08.81	Q
7	4	5	Rachel Nicol	Canada	1:08.87	Q
8	3	4	Sarah Vasey	England	1:08.95	Q
9	3	6	Chloé Tutton	Wales	1:09.06	Q
10	2	6	Molly Renshaw	England	1:09.40	Q
10	3	2	Kaylene Corbett	South Africa	1:09.40	Q
12	4	2	Corrie Scott	Scotland	1:09.51	Q
13	2	7	Laura Kinley	Isle of Man	1:09.71	Q
14	2	5	Jocelyn Ulyett	England	1:09.74	Q
15	4	6	Alia Atkinson	Jamaica	1:09.83	Q
16	3	1	Emily Visagie	South Africa	1:10.65	Q
17	3	7	Bronagh Ryan	New Zealand	1:10.78	
18	2	1	Niamh Robinson	Isle of Man	1:11.10	
19	2	2	Beth Sloan	Wales	1:11.34	
20	4	1	Roanne Ho	Singapore	1:11.92	
21	4	8	Tilka Paljk	Zambia	1:12.01	
22	4	7	Lillian Higgs	Bahamas	1:12.78	
23	3	8	Stephanie Brew	Isle of Man	1:15.06	
24	1	4	Kirsten Fisher-Marsters	Cook Islands	1:15.41	
25	1	5	Oreoluwa Cherebin	Grenada	1:17.29	
26	1	3	Aliah Maginley	Antigua and Barbuda	1:26.15	

=== Semifinals ===
The semifinals were held on 8 April at 21:03.

==== Semifinal 1 ====
Rank	Lane	Name	Nationality	Time	Notes
1	4	Tatjana Schoenmaker	South Africa	1:06.65	Q
2	5	Kierra Smith	Canada	1:07.64	Q
3	3	Jessica Hansen	Australia	1:07.93	Q
4	6	Sarah Vasey	England	1:08.50	Q
5	1	Jocelyn Ulyett	England	1:08.68	
6	2	Molly Renshaw	England	1:09.22	
7	7	Corrie Scott	Scotland	1:09.32	
8	8	Emily Visagie	South Africa	1:10.80	

==== Semifinal 2 ====
Rank	Lane	Name	Nationality	Time	Notes
1	4	Georgia Bohl	Australia	1:07.13	Q
2	3	Faith Knelson	Canada	1:07.30	Q
3	5	Leiston Pickett	Australia	1:07.71	Q
4	2	Chloé Tutton	Wales	1:08.54	Q
5	6	Rachel Nicol	Canada	1:08.67	
6	7	Kaylene Corbett	South Africa	1:09.36	
7	8	Alia Atkinson	Jamaica	1:09.83	
8	1	Laura Kinley	Isle of Man	1:10.93	

=== Final ===
The final was held on 9 April at 21:12.

Rank	Lane	Name	Nationality	Time	Notes
1st place, gold medalist(s)	4	Tatjana Schoenmaker	South Africa	1:06.41	AF
2nd place, silver medalist(s)	6	Kierra Smith	Canada	1:07.05	
3rd place, bronze medalist(s)	5	Georgia Bohl	Australia	1:07.22	
4	3	Faith Knelson	Canada	1:07.84	
5	8	Chloé Tutton	Wales	1:07.87	
6	2	Leiston Pickett	Australia	1:08.04	
7	1	Sarah Vasey	England	1:08.36	
8	7	Jessica Hansen	Australia	1:08.53	
