= Anastasia's Pool =

Former sea bath in Broome, Western Australia

Coordinates: 17.97344°S 122.17676°E

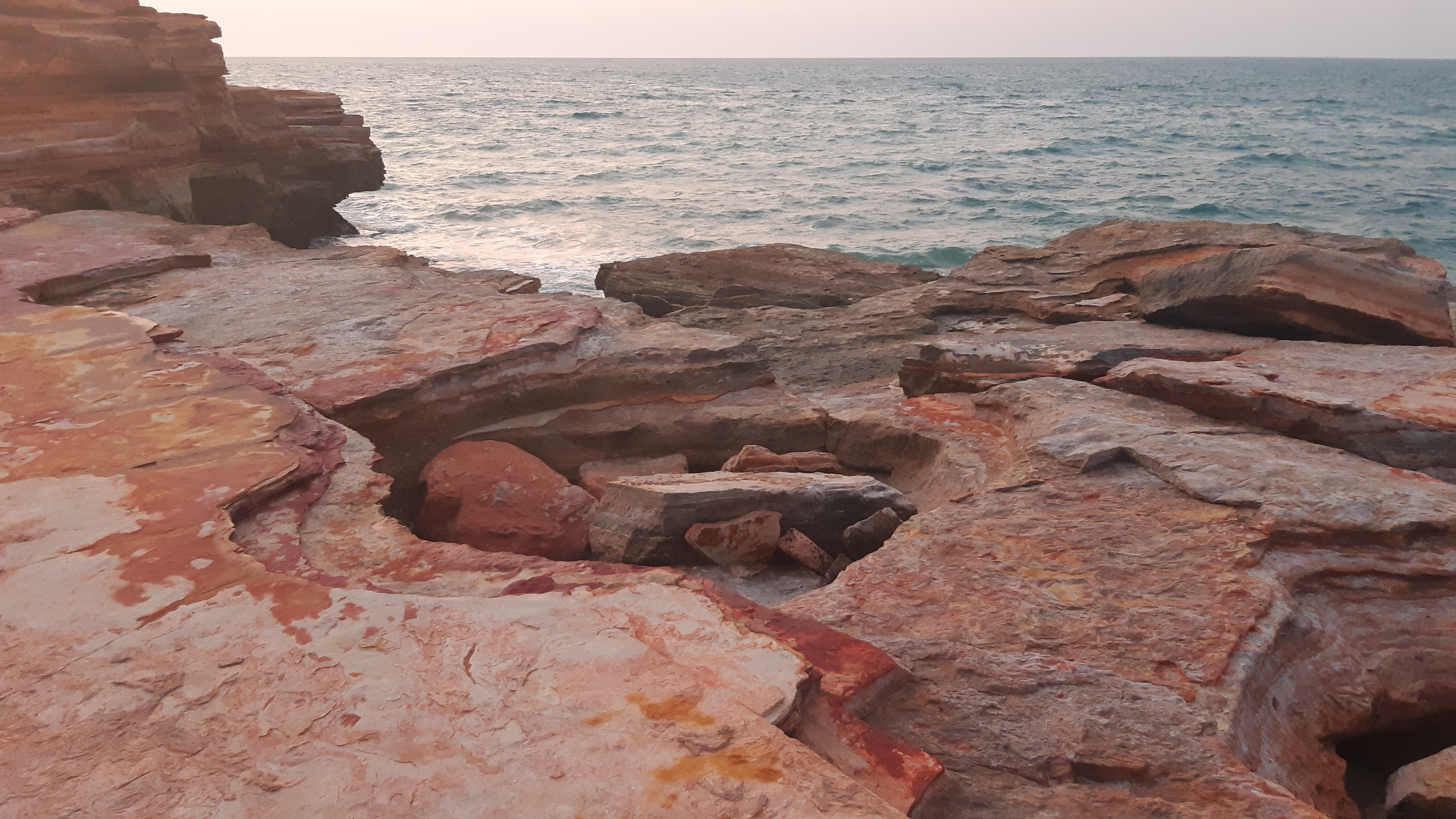
The remains of Anastasia's Pool in November 2024

Anastasia's Pool was a sea bath in Broome in Western Australia. It was destroyed in early 2014. The pool was built sometime between 1922 and 1929 by Patrick Percy for his wife Anastasia after whom the pool is named.

The pool was constructed by the addition of a hand-placed concrete bottom to a small, intertidal, natural, rock pool found on Gantheaume Point in the locality of Minyirr, approximately 10 km south west of Broome. It is said that this work was undertaken by Patrick Percy so that his wife could exercise to help her arthritis.

The remains of Anastasia's Pool are still a significant tourist attraction, despite it never having been on the formal heritage register.

== Controversy about Patrick Percy ==
The commonly told myth about Anastasia's Pool is that Patrick Percy was a lighthouse keeper and Anastasia his mermaid wife.

Patrick Percy, a successful pearler and ex-police officer, purchased the lighthouse keeper's cottage in 1922 after the lighthouse itself had been automated. It was some after this that he built the Pool for his wife, before she died in 1929. Patrick Percy died not long after in 1931 leaving no will and no heirs. After four years of searching for some family to pass on his estate, it was discovered that he had been born in Ireland as 'Patrick Sullivan' and had fled to Australia under an assumed name to escape his wife there and live with Anastasia. It is also believed that he spread the rumour that he had fled Ireland because he had killed a landlord in order to hide his true reason for leaving.

Patrick's estate was paid to his 90 year old mother who was found still living in Ireland.

Patrick and Anastasia are buried in the Roman Catholic section of Broome Cemetery in unmarked graves.

== Destruction of Pool ==
In January 2014, it was discovered that storms and heavy seas had destroyed Anastasia's Pool. When first reported, the damage was estimated as being 50% of the structure, but by the time an inspection was conducted on 30 January 2014, over 70% of the structure was damaged and the concrete base completely washed away.

Repairing the Pool was considered a significant risk to the surrounding environment, unlikely to succeed, and would have been extremely costly. The Shire of Broome decided to abandon the Pool and add signage detailing the historic significance of the place.
