= Richard Eliason =

Australian swimmer (born 1988)

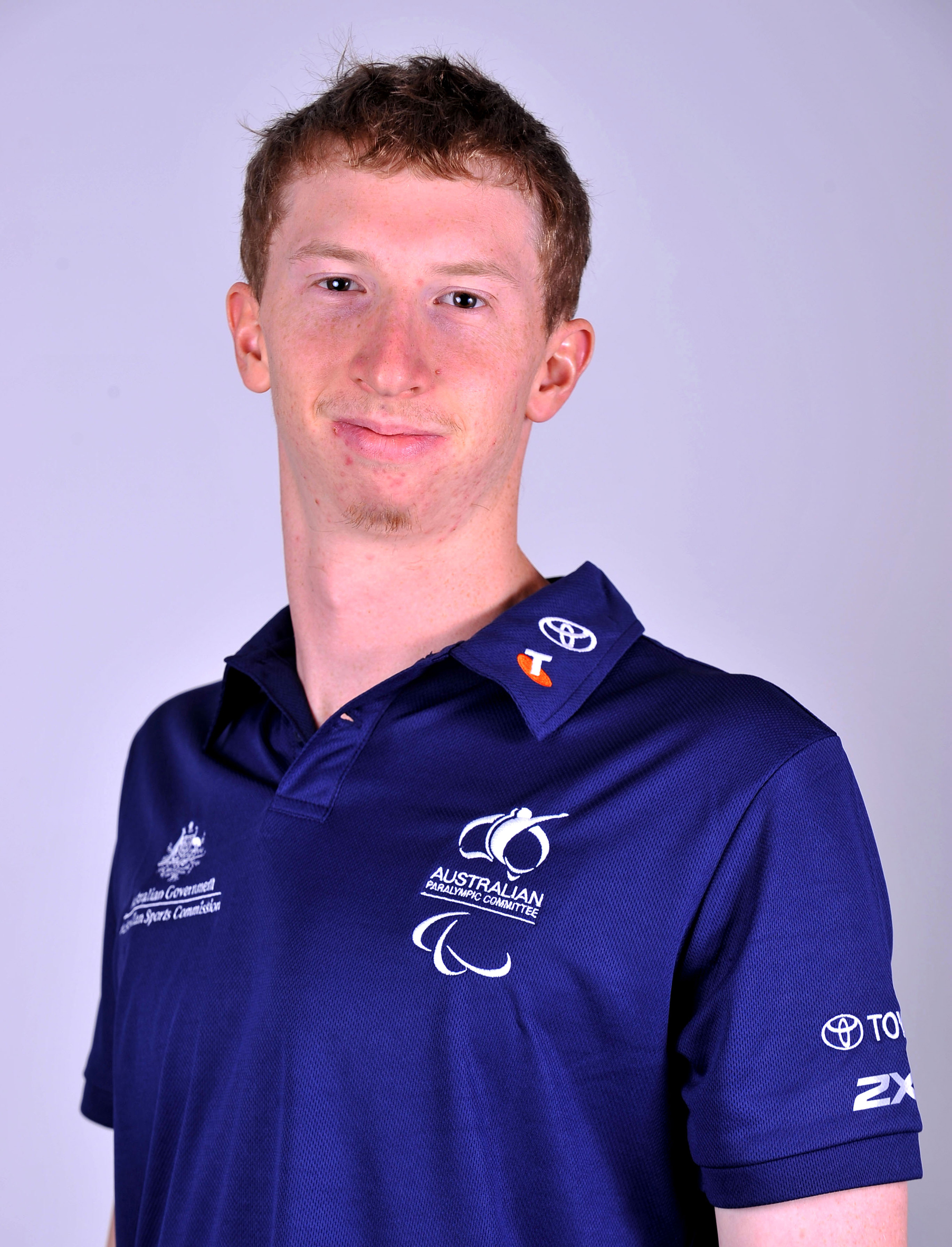
- 2012 Australian Paralympic team portrait of Eliason

Personal information
- Full name: Richard Eliason
- Nationality: Australia
- Born: 8 April 1988 (age 38)

Sport
- Sport: Swimming
- Strokes: Freestyle, breaststroke
- Classifications: S14, SB14, SM14
Medal record
Men's paralympic swimming
Representing Australia
World Championships (LC)
Silver medal – second place	2010 Eindhoven	100 m breaststroke SB14

Richard Eliason (born 8 April 1988) is an Australian swimmer. He was selected to represent Australia at the 2012 Summer Paralympics in swimming. He has an intellectual disability and was among the first intellectually disabled athletes to compete in the Paralympics after the 2000 Summer Paralympics intellectual disability controversy. While he did not receive a medal at the Games, he placed 5th in the final. He is a recipient of the Service to Australian Swim Team award.

== Personal ==
Eliason was born on 8 April 1988 with an intellectual disability and is from Flynn, Australian Capital Territory. In December 2011 during his preparation for the national selection trials for the 2012 Summer Paralympics, Eliason was injured in a motorbike accident, breaking his spine in five places, preventing him from training for two months. Some of his Games preparation took place at the Canberra International Sports & Aquatic Centre. Given his motorbike accident, his coaches advised him to take the bus from place to place and to avoid using his bike until after the Paralympics.

== Swimming ==
Eliason is an SB14 classified swimmer, and is coached by Cameron Gledhill at his club venue Canberra International Sports & Aquatic Centre. As of 2012, he had a swimming scholarship with the Australian Capital Territory Academy of Sport. He started competitive swimming in 2001. At the Brisbane hosted 2006 Australian national titles, he placed in the top three in the 400 metres freestyle multi-disability event. In March 2012, he competed in the Adelaide hosted national selection trials, where he won the men's 100 metres breaststroke with a time of 1:10.07.

Eliason made his national team debut at the 2005 INAS-FID Global Games, where he won a silver medal in the 200 metre breaststroke event. He won a pair of gold medals, four silver medals and a bronze medal 2007 INAS-FID Global Games. He competed in the Global Games again in 2009, where he earned a pair of gold and silver medals, and three bronze medals. He was a member of the Australian team competing at the Dutch hosted 2011 IPC World Swimming Championships. in 2012 he posted the fastest time in the world in his classification in the 100 meters butterfly.

=== Paralympics ===
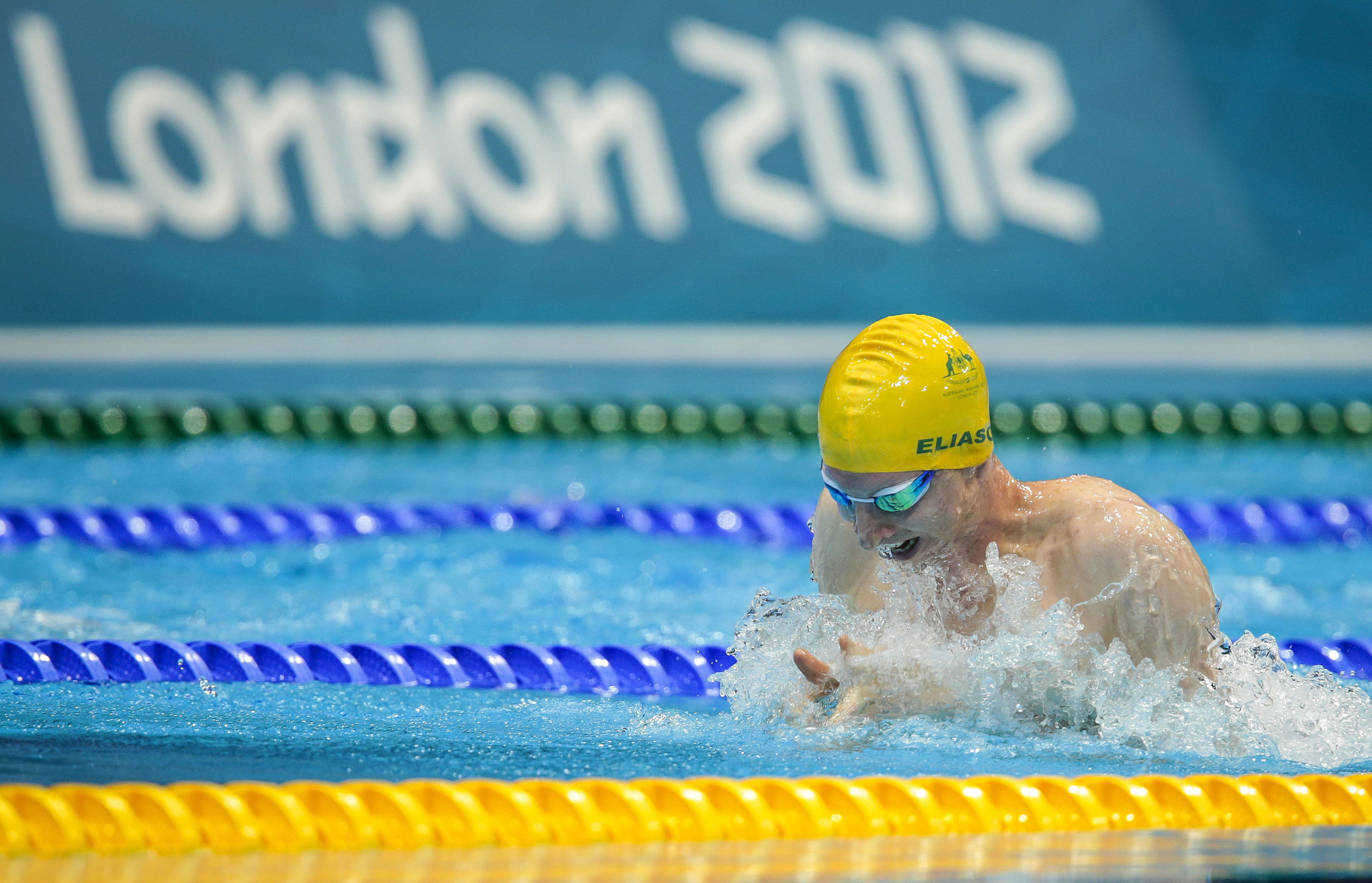
Eliason at the 2012 London Paralympics

In July 2012, Eliason was formally selected to represent Australia at the 2012 Summer Paralympics in the men's 100 metres breaststroke event in the intellectual disability classification, which had been excluded since the 2000 Summer Paralympics intellectual disability controversy. He placed 5th in the final. He did not gain a medal at the 2012 Games.

=== Personal bests ===
Course	Event	Time	Meet	Swim Date	Reference
Long	50m Breaststroke	32.03	2012 EnergyAustralia Swimming Championships	22-Mar-12	
Long	100m Breaststroke	01:10.7	2012 EnergyAustralia Swimming Championships	18-Mar-12	
Long	200m Breaststroke	02:40.1	Canberra Christmas Classic 2007	1-Dec-07	
Long	50m Butterfly	30.91	2008 Telstra Australian Swimming Championship	22-Mar-08	
Long	50m Freestyle	27	2009 Burley Griffin October Meet	10-Oct-09	
Long	100m Freestyle	01:00.5	2010 Telstra Australian Championship	16-Mar-10	
Long	200m Freestyle	02:16.3	Telopea Summer Meet 2005	5-Nov-05	
Long	400m Freestyle	04:48.5	ACT Summer	19-Nov-05	
Long	200m Medley	02:33.6	2012 EnergyAustralia Swimming Championships	20-Mar-12	
Short	50m Backstroke	37.26	Canberra WDS Meet	11-Jun-06	
Short	50m Breaststroke	31.72	2012 NSW SC Country Championships	7-Jul-12	
Short	100m Breaststroke	01:08.6	2012 NSW SC Country Championships	8-Jul-12	
Short	200m Breaststroke	02:33.8	2006 NSW State Age SC Championships	15-Sep-06	
Short	50m Butterfly	29.49	2011 Australian Short Course Championships	3-Jul-11	
Short	100m Butterfly	01:09.9	Canberra WDS Meet	11-Jun-06	
Short	50m Freestyle	26.29	ACT Short Course Championships	1-Aug-09	
Short	100m Freestyle	59.82	Ginninderra Winter Short Course Carnival 2010	26-Jun-10	
Short	200m Freestyle	02:14.1	2010 TVSC Annual Qualifying Meet	23-May-10	
Short	200m Medley	02:31.5	Canberra WDS Meet	11-Jun-06	

== Awards ==
In 2017, Eliason was awarded the Service to Australian Swim Team award.
