= Jeremy McClure =

Australian swimmer and Paralympian

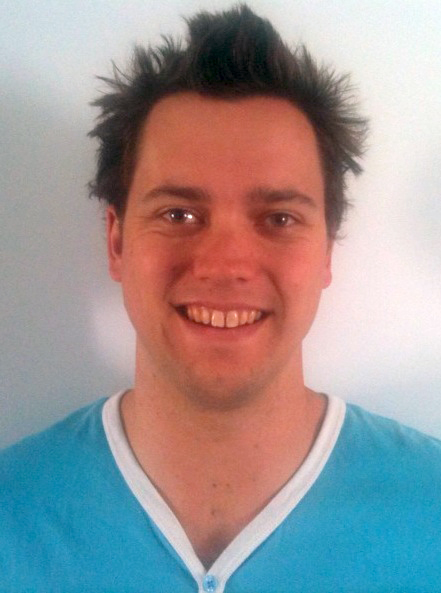
- Portrait of Australian Paralympic swimmer McClure in 2012

Personal information
- Full name: Jeremy McClure
- Nationality: Australia
- Born: 25 May 1987 (age 39) Perth, Western Australia

Sport
- Sport: Swimming
- Strokes: Freestyle, butterfly, medley
- Classifications: S11
- Club: Riverton Aquanauts
- Coach: Mel Tantrum
Medal record
Men's paratriathlon
Representing Australia
Oceania Championships
Bronze medal – third place	2014 Penrith	PT5

Jeremy McClure (born 25 May 1987) is an Australian swimmer, triathlete and motivational speaker. He competed at four Paralympics - 2004 Athens, 2008 Beijing, 2012 London and 2016 Rio.

== Personal ==
McClure was born on 25 May 1987 in Perth, Western Australia and is from Bull Creek, Western Australia. He was diagnosed with Leber's hereditary optic neuropathy when he was fifteen years old and lost most of his sight. He uses a guide dog named Nina as he only has about two percent of available vision. In 2006, he participated in the Commonwealth Games torch relay. In 2010, he won a Pride of Australia award. He works as a motivational speaker, and given a speeches to schools in Western Australia and to the West Coast Eagles. As of 2016, he also works as a part-time remedial massage therapist.

== Sporting career ==
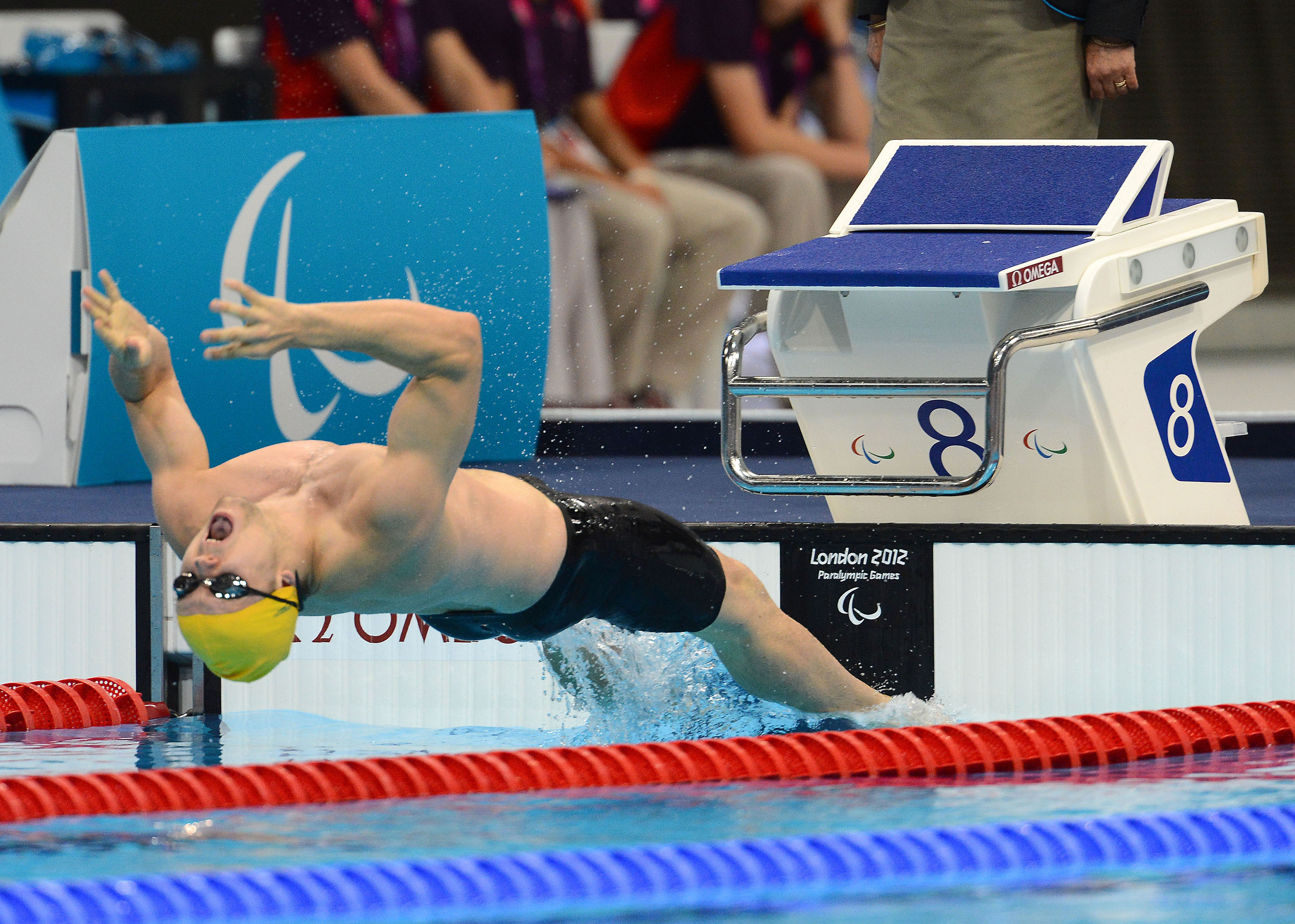
McClure at the 2012 London Paralympics

=== Swimming ===
McClure is an S11 classified swimmer, and is a member of South Shore Swimming Club. He started swimming in 2002 and competitively in May 2003.

McClure competed at the 2004 Summer Paralympics, finishing sixth in the 100 metre backstroke. He competed at his second Paralympics in 2008, finishing seventh in the 100 metre backstroke. He was selected to represent Australia at the 2012 Summer Paralympics in swimming. Going into the 2012 Games, he was ranked fifth in the 100 metre backstroke event, fourth in the 50 metre breaststroke and third in the 50 metre backstroke event. He did not medal at the 2012 Games and his best result was eighth in 100 metre backstroke

At the 2016 Australian Swimming Championships in Adelaide, he set a new world record of 32.22 in the Men's S11 50m backstroke.

At the 2016 Rio Paralympic Games, McClure placed fifth in the Men's 100m Backstroke S11. He also competed in Men's 50m Freestyle S11 and Men's 100m Freestyle S11. In preparation for Rio, McClure stated: “I’m definitely confident I can drop that time but breaking the record all depends how much I can drop it by. The ultimate goal is to win gold and break the record but I’d love to just get any medal at this point really.”

In early 2022 he became the first person to swim from Dirk Hartog Island to the town of Denham and he became the first person to swim the 60 kilometres (37 mi) from the Abrolhos Islands to the city of Geraldton in September 2022.

=== Paratriathlon ===
In 2011, McClure competed in his first triathlon when he took part in the Ironman 70.3 Busselton, finishing the event in 5:03:43. He required sighted guides to assist him on the course. They were Stewart Collingwood for the 1.9 km swim, Frans Buissink for 90 km cycle component and Craig Andrew for the 21 km run. He participated in the event in order to raise money for Guide Dogs Western Australia. His performance in the race earned him Triathlon Western Australia's Paul Goodwin Award. He has also raced in a number of other triathlons, including Busselton 70.3 in 2012.

He qualified to represent Australia in the sprint-distance 2013 ITU Paratriathlon World Championships in London, where he placed 8th in the TRI6a classification for blind athletes. In January 2014, he won the TRI6a class at the 2014 OTU Oceania Championships in Penrith. Reclassified TRI6b, he placed second in the Elwood ITU World Paratriathlon event.
