= Guy Harrison-Murray =

Australian Paralympic swimmer

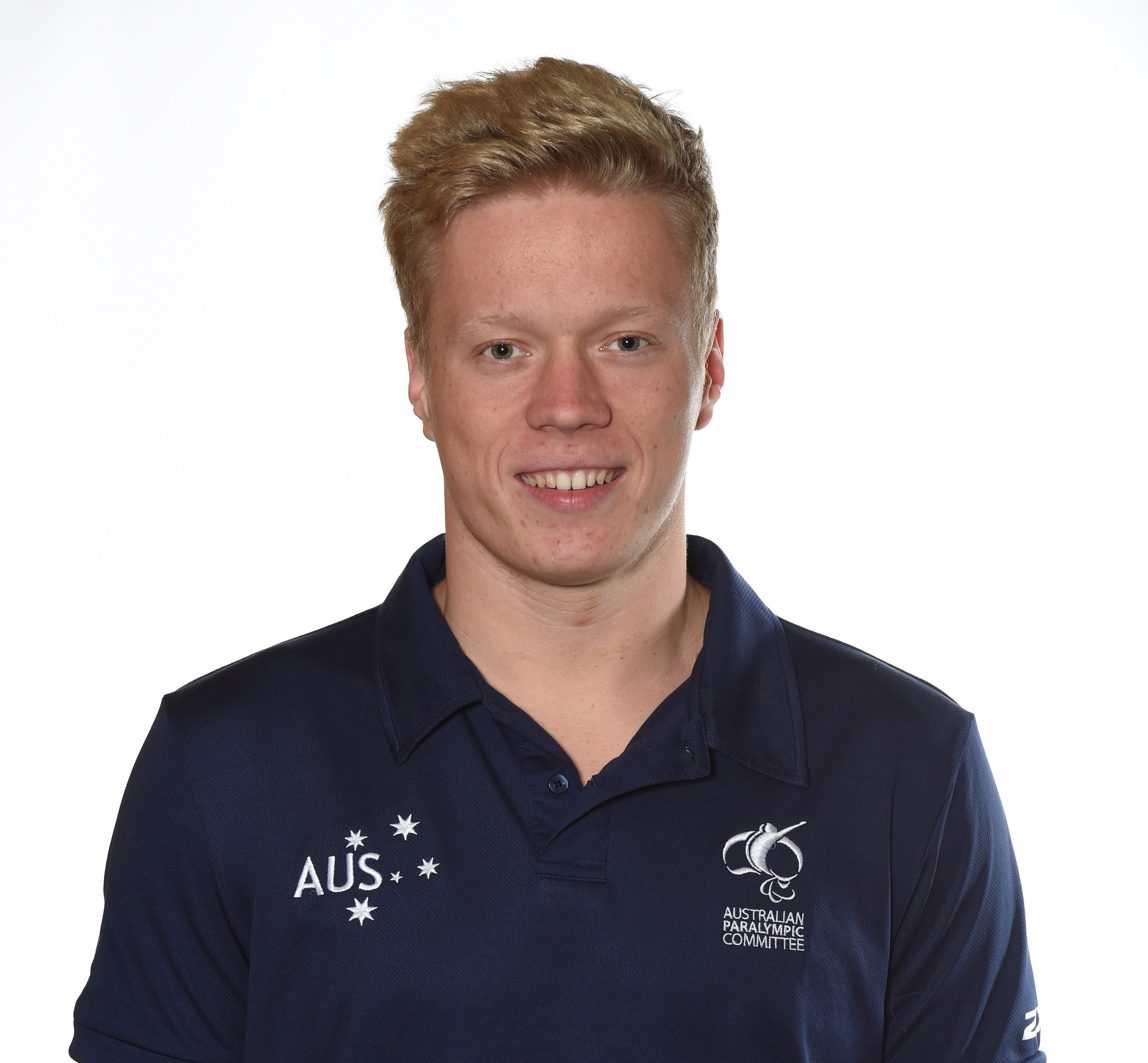

Personal information
- Full name: Guy Harrison-Murray
- Nationality: Australia/United Kingdom
- Born: 17 April 1997 (age 29) Bath, England

Sport
- Sport: Swimming
- Strokes: Freestyle
- Classifications: S10, SB10, SM10
- Club: Perth City
Medal record
Men's paralympic swimming
Representing Australia
IPC Swimming World Championships
Bronze medal – third place	2015 Glasgow	Men's 4 x 100m Freestyle 34 points

Guy Harrison-Murray (born 17 April 1997) is an Australian Paralympic swimmer. He represented Australia at the 2016 Rio Paralympics.

== Personal ==
Harrison-Murray was born on 17 April 1997 in Bath, England. He was born with congenital bilateral talipes, a condition where his tendons on the inside of his leg are shortened, the bones have an unusual shape and the Achilles tendon is tightened. In 2011, he moved with his family to Perth, Western Australia. In January 2015, he was granted Australian citizenship that would allow him to compete for Australia at the 2016 Rio Paralympics. He attended the International School of Western Australia.

== Career ==
Harrison-Murray took up swimming at the age of three. He is classified as an S10 swimmer. He made his debut for Australia at the 2014 Para Pan Pacific Swimming Championships. At the 2015 IPC Swimming World Championships in Glasgow, Scotland, he won a bronze medal in the Men's 4 × 100 m Freestyle Relay 34 points. He finished fourth in the Men's 400m Freestyle S10, sixth in the Men's 100m Freestyle S10 and seventh in the Men's 50m Freestyle S10.

In February 2014, he was a member of a team that won the Mixed Team category at the Rottnest Channel Swim. In 2015, he was coached by Jan Cameron at the University of the Sunshine Coast. Previously, he was coached by Ian Mills at the Perth City Swim Club.

In 2016, he competed in three events at the 2016 Rio Paralympic Games. Harrison-Murray finished eighth in Men's 400m Freestyle S10, seventh in Men's 50m Freestyle S10 but didn't progress to the finals in Men's 100m Freestyle S10.
