= Joshua Palmer =

Australian swimmer (born 1991)

Personal information
- Born: 10 August 1991 (age 33); Rose Park, South Australia, Australia

Sport
- Sport: Swimming

Joshua Palmer (born 10 August 1991) is an Australian swimmer. He competed in the men's 100 metre breaststroke event at the 2016 Summer Olympics.
