= Jorden Merrilees =

Australian swimmer

Personal information
- Nationality: Australian
- Born: 24 July 1994 (age 31)

Sport
- Sport: Swimming
- Strokes: backstroke

Jorden Merrilees (born 24 July 1994) is an Australian swimmer. He competed in the men's 200 metre backstroke event at the 2018 FINA World Swimming Championships (25 m), in Hangzhou, China.
