= Swimming at the 2007 World Aquatics Championships – Men's 200 metre butterfly =

Men's 200 metre butterfly at the 2007 FINA World Championships
- Venue: Rod Laver Arena
- Dates: 27 March 2007 (heats, semifinals); 28 March 2007 (final)
- Competitors: 64
- Winning time: 1:52.09 WR

Medalists
| gold medal | Michael Phelps | United States |
| silver medal | Wu Peng | China |
| bronze medal | Nikolay Skvortsov | Russia |

The men's 200 metre butterfly at the 2007 World Aquatics Championships took place on 27 March (heats and semifinals) and on the evening of 28 March (final) at Rod Laver Arena in Melbourne, Australia. 64 swimmers were entered in the event, of which 62 swam.

Existing records at the start of the event were:

- World record (WR): 1:53.71, Michael Phelps (USA), 17 February 2007 in Columbia, United States.
- Championship record (CR): 1:53.98, Michael Phelps (USA), Barcelona, Spain (22 July 2003)

== Results ==
=== Finals ===
The finals started at 19:23 on 28 March 2007

| Place | Lane | Name | Nationality | Time | Notes |
|---|---|---|---|---|---|
| 1st place, gold medalist(s) | 4 | Michael Phelps | United States | 1:52.09 | WR |
| 2nd place, silver medalist(s) | 5 | Wu Peng | China | 1:55.13 | |
| 3rd place, bronze medalist(s) | 7 | Nikolay Skvortsov | Russia | 1:55.22 | |
| 4 | 2 | Moss Burmester | New Zealand | 1:55.35 | |
| 5 | 3 | Ryuichi Shibata | Japan | 1:55.81 | |
| 6 | 1 | Paweł Korzeniowski | Poland | 1:55.87 | |
| 7 | 8 | Ioannis Drymonakos | Greece | 1:56.48 | |
| 8 | 6 | Chen Yin | China | 1:58.15 | |

=== Semifinals ===
The semifinals started at 20:34 on 27 March 2007.

| Rank | Heat/Lane | Name | Nationality | Time | Notes |
|---|---|---|---|---|---|
| 1 | S2-L4 | Michael Phelps | USA | 1:55.13 | Q |
| 2 | S2-L2 | Wu Peng | China | 1:55.17 | Q |
| 3 | S2-L5 | Ryuichi Shibata | Japan | 1:55.96 | Q |
| 4 | S1-L7 | Chen Yin | China | 1:56.04 | Q |
| 5 | S1-L2 | Moss Burmester | New Zealand | 1:56.27 | Q |
| 6 | S2-L7 | Nikolay Skvortsov | Russia | 1:56.28 | Q |
| 7 | S1-L3 | Paweł Korzeniowski | Poland | 1:56.30 | Q |
| 8 | S1-L5 | Ioannis Drymonakos | Greece | 1:56.47 | Q |
| 9 | S2-L3 | Takeshi Matsuda | Japan | 1:56.57 | |
| 10 | S1-L4 | Davis Tarwater | USA | 1:56.58 | |
| 11 | S2-L6 | Sergiy Advena | Ukraine | 1:57.06 | |
| 12 | S2-L1 | Nick D'Arcy | Australia | 1:57.15 | |
| 13 | S1-L6 | Travis Nederpelt | Australia | 1:57.71 | |
| 14 | S2-L8 | Juan Veloz | Mexico | 1:57.83 | |
| 15 | S1-L8 | Lukasz Drzewinski | Poland | 1:58.67 | |
| 16 | S1-L1 | Romanos Iasonas Alyfantis | Greece | 2:00.31 | |

=== Heats ===
The 8 heats began at 10:27 on 27 March 2007.

==== Heat 1 ====
| Rank | Lane | Name | Nationality | Time | Notes |
|---|---|---|---|---|---|
| 1 | 1 | Daniel Bego | Malaysia | 2:04.99 | |
| 2 | 4 | Andy Wibowo | Indonesia | 2:09.09 | |
| 3 | 6 | Nasir Ali | Pakistan | 2:12.48 | |
| 4 | 7 | Omar Núñez | Nicaragua | 2:12.55 | |
| 5 | 2 | Alejandro Madde | Bolivia | 2:14.24 | |
| 6 | 5 | Bertrand Bristol | Seychelles | 2:14.84 | |
| 7 | 3 | Eros Qama | Albania | 2:17.79 | |
| | 8 | Abdul−Fatawu Moro | Ghana | DNS | |

==== Heat 2 ====
| Rank | Lane | Name | Nationality | Time | Notes |
|---|---|---|---|---|---|
| 1 | 7 | Chris Boe Christensen | Denmark | 2:04.45 | |
| 2 | 2 | Rehan Poncha | India | 2:04.75 | |
| 3 | 6 | Sergey Pankov | Uzbekistan | 2:05.93 | |
| 4 | 5 | Ng Tze Kang | Singapore | 2:06.41 | |
| 5 | 3 | Radomyos Matjiur | Thailand | 2:07.96 | |
| 6 | 1 | Carlos Eduardo Gil | Peru | 2:10.55 | |
| 7 | 4 | Miro Krestevski | Macedonia | 2:11.76 | |
| 8 | 8 | Nuno Rola | Angola | 2:13.78 | |

==== Heat 3 ====
| Rank | Lane | Name | Nationality | Time | Notes |
|---|---|---|---|---|---|
| 1 | 8 | Javier Hernandez Maradiaga | Honduras | 2:03.37 | |
| 2 | 3 | Oleg Lyashko | Uzbekistan | 2:04.22 | |
| 3 | 1 | Jorge Arturo Arce Aita | Costa Rica | 2:04.38 | |
| 4 | 5 | Arjun Muralidharan | India | 2:06.45 | |
| 5 | 7 | Tan Xue-Wei | Singapore | 2:06.74 | |
| 6 | 4 | Roy Felipe Barahona Fuente | Honduras | 2:09.29 | |
| 7 | 6 | Waleed Al-Qahtani | Kuwait | 2:09.48 | |
| 8 | 2 | Yu-An Lin | Chinese Taipei | 2:11.77 | |

==== Heat 4 ====
| Rank | Lane | Name | Nationality | Time | Notes |
|---|---|---|---|---|---|
| 1 | 4 | Dávid Verrasztó | Hungary | 2:00.00 | |
| 2 | 5 | George Du Rand | South Africa | 2:01.78 | |
| 3 | 6 | Paulius Andrijauskas | Lithuania | 2:01.98 | |
| 4 | 7 | Sofiane Daid | Algeria | 2:03.17 | |
| 5 | 8 | Emmanuel Crescimbeni | Peru | 2:03.63 | |
| 6 | 3 | Donny Utomo | Indonesia | 2:04.03 | |
| 7 | 1 | Marco Camargo | Ecuador | 2:07.71 | |
| | 2 | Ahmed Salamoun | Qatar | DNS | |

==== Heat 5 ====
| Rank | Lane | Name | Nationality | Time | Notes |
|---|---|---|---|---|---|
| 1 | 3 | Dinko Jukić | Austria | 1:59.63 | |
| 2 | 8 | Diogo Carvalho | Portugal | 1:59.67 | |
| 3 | 6 | Pablo Marmolejo | Mexico | 2:00.93 | |
| 4 | 2 | Duarte Mourao | Portugal | 2:01.76 | |
| 5 | 4 | Georgi Palazov | Bulgaria | 2:02.02 | |
| 6 | 1 | Michal Rubáček | Czech Republic | 2:02.69 | |
| 7 | 7 | Julio Galofre | Colombia | 2:03.02 | |
| 8 | 5 | Fernando Silva | Brazil | 2:03.63 | |

==== Heat 6 ====
| Rank | Lane | Name | Nationality | Time | Notes |
|---|---|---|---|---|---|
| 1 | 4 | Paweł Korzeniowski | Poland | 1:57.11 | Q |
| 2 | 5 | Moss Burmester | New Zealand | 1:57.53 | Q |
| 3 | 6 | Nikolay Skvortsov | Russia | 1:57.64 | Q |
| 4 | 3 | Chen Yin | China | 1:57.80 | Q |
| 5 | 1 | Romanos Iasonas Alyfantis | Greece | 1:57.91 | Q |
| 6 | 2 | Lukasz Drzewinski | Poland | 1:57.97 | |
| 7 | 7 | Jeremy Knowles | Bahamas | 1:59.20 | |
| 8 | 8 | Andrew McMillan | New Zealand | 1:59.98 | |

==== Heat 7 ====
| Rank | Lane | Name | Nationality | Time | Notes |
|---|---|---|---|---|---|
| 1 | 6 | Davis Tarwater | United States | 1:56.63 | Q |
| 2 | 5 | Takeshi Matsuda | Japan | 1:57.10 | Q |
| 3 | 7 | Sergiy Advena | Ukraine | 1:57.14 | Q |
| 4 | 4 | Wu Peng | China | 1:57.49 | Q |
| 5 | 8 | Tamás Kerékjártó | Hungary | 1:57.54 | Q |
| 6 | 1 | Juan Veloz | Mexico | 1:57.93 | Q |
| 7 | 3 | Ioan Stefan Gherghel | Romania | 1:58.48 | |
| 8 | 2 | Francesco Vespe | Italy | 1:59.47 | |

==== Heat 8 ====
| Rank | Lane | Name | Nationality | Time | Notes |
|---|---|---|---|---|---|
| 1 | 4 | Michael Phelps | United States | 1:55.78 | Q |
| 2 | 5 | Ryuichi Shibata | Japan | 1:56.81 | Q |
| 3 | 6 | Ioannis Drymonakos | Greece | 1:56.93 | Q |
| 4 | 3 | Travis Nederpelt | Australia | 1:57.14 | Q |
| 5 | 7 | Nick D'Arcy | Australia | 1:57.88 | Q |
| 6 | 8 | Mathieu Fonteyn | Belgium | 1:58.75 | |
| 7 | 2 | Christophe Lebon | France | 2:00.20 | |
| 8 | 1 | Benjamin Starke | Germany | 2:01.01 | |

== See also ==
- Swimming at the 2005 World Aquatics Championships – Men's 200 metre butterfly
- Swimming at the 2008 Summer Olympics – Men's 200 metre butterfly
- Swimming at the 2009 World Aquatics Championships – Men's 200 metre butterfly
