= 200 metres butterfly =

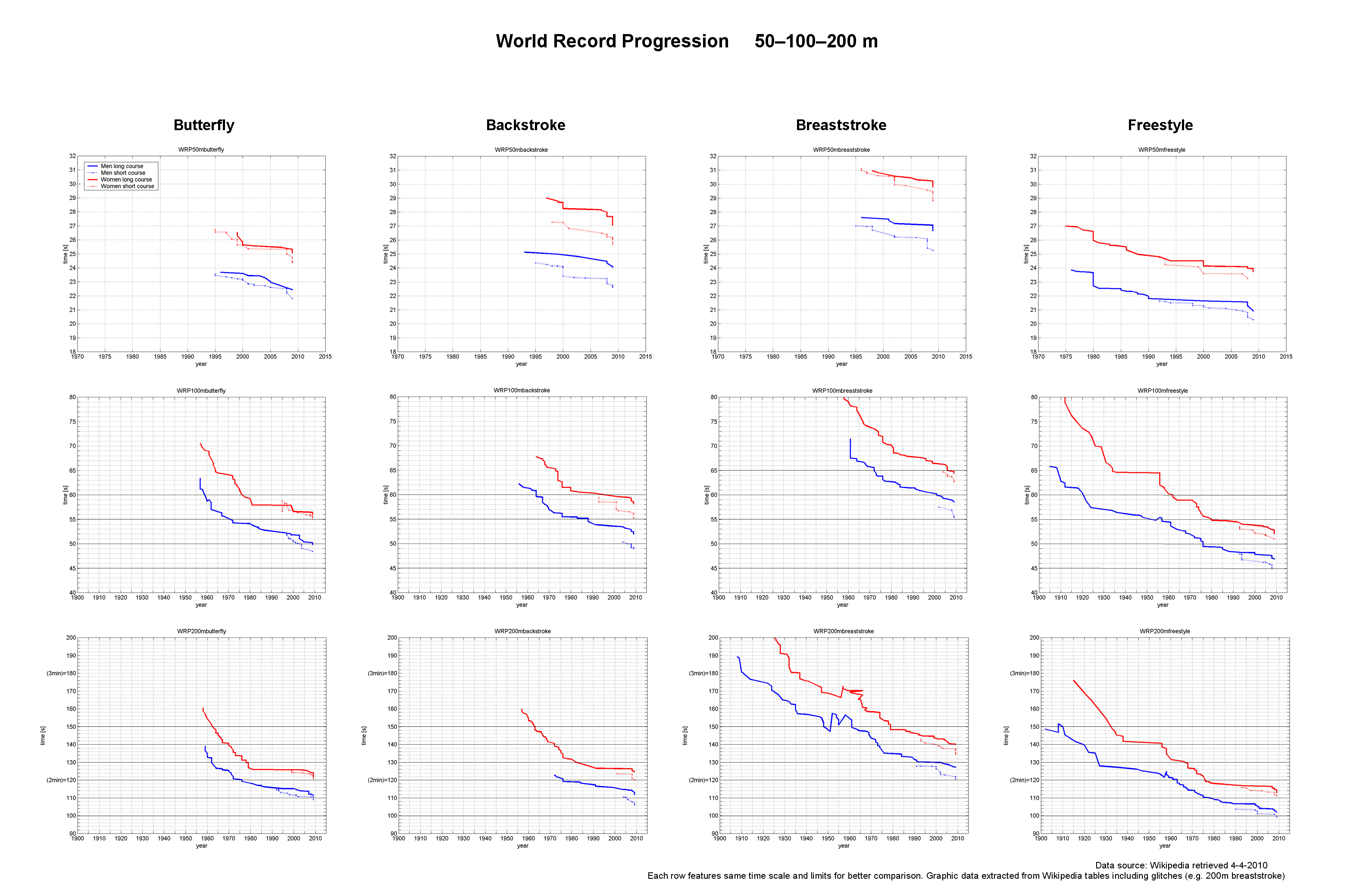
Graphs of the progression of the World Records in all four strokes (50m, 100m and 200m distances).

The 200 metres butterfly is an event in competitive swimming. World records are ratified by World Aquatics (formerly FINA). The current long course world record holders are Hungary's Kristóf Milák and Canada's Summer McIntosh, while the current short course world record holders are Japan's Tomoru Honda, and McIntosh.

The men's event was first contested at the Olympic Games in 1956, while the women's event was introduced at the 1968 games; the current Olympic champions are France's Léon Marchand, and McIntosh. The men's and women's events have been contested at the World Aquatics Championships since the inaugural championships in 1973; the current world champions (long course) are the US' Luca Urlando, and McIntosh. The men's and women's events have been contested at the World Aquatics Swimming Championships (25m) since the inaugural championships in 1993; the current world champions (short course) are Canada's Ilya Kharun and McIntosh.

== World record progression ==
=== Men long course ===
#	Time		Name	Nationality	Date	Meet	Location	Ref
1	2:19.0		Mike Troy	United States	11 July 1959	-	Los Altos, United States	
2	2:16.4		Mike Troy	United States	11 July 1959	-	Los Altos, United States	
3	2:15.0		Mike Troy	United States	10 July 1960	-	Evansville, United States	
4	2:13.4		Mike Troy	United States	23 July 1960	-	Toledo, United States	
5	2:13.2		Mike Troy	United States	4 August 1960	US Olympic Trials	Detroit, United States	
6	2:12.8		Mike Troy	United States	2 September 1960	Olympic Games	Rome, Italy	
7	2:12.6		Carl Robie	United States	19 August 1961	Men’s NAAA Championships	Los Angeles, United States	
8	2:12.5		Kevin Berry	Australia	20 February 1962	-	Melbourne, Australia	
9	2:12.4	h	Carl Robie	United States	11 August 1962	Men’s National Outdoor Championships	Cuyahoga Falls, United States	
10	2:10.8		Carl Robie	United States	11 August 1962	Men’s National Outdoor Championships	Cuyahoga Falls, United States	
11	2:09.7		Kevin Berry	Australia	23 October 1962	Australian Trials	Melbourne, Australia	
12	2:08.4		Kevin Berry	Australia	12 January 1963	-	Sydney, Australia	
13	2:08.2		Carl Robie	United States	18 March 1963	-	Tokyo, Japan	
14	2:06.9		Kevin Berry	Australia	29 March 1964	-	Sydney, Australia	
15	2:06.6		Kevin Berry	Australia	18 October 1964	Olympic Games	Tokyo, Japan	
16	2:06.4		Mark Spitz	United States	26 July 1967	Pan American Games	Winnipeg, Canada	
17	2:06.0		John Ferris	United States	30 August 1967	Summer Universiade	Tokyo, Japan	
18	2:05.7		Mark Spitz	United States	8 October 1967	-	West Berlin, West Germany	
19	2:05.4		Mark Spitz	United States	22 August 1970	AAU Nationals	Los Angeles, United States	
20	2:05.0		Gary Hall Sr.	United States	22 August 1970	AAU Nationals	Los Angeles, United States	
21	2:03.9		Mark Spitz	United States	27 August 1971	AAU Nationals	Houston, United States	
22	2:03.3		Hans-Joachim Fassnacht	West Germany	31 August 1971	-	Landskrona, Sweden	
23	2:01.87	h	Mark Spitz	United States	2 August 1972	US Olympic Trials	Chicago, United States	
24	2:01.53		Mark Spitz	United States	2 August 1972	US Olympic Trials	Chicago, United States	
25	2:00.70		Mark Spitz	United States	28 August 1972	Olympic Games	Munich, West Germany	
26	2:00.21	h	Roger Pyttel	East Germany	3 June 1976	East German Championships	East Berlin, East Germany	
27	1:59.63		Roger Pyttel	East Germany	3 June 1976	East German Championships	East Berlin, East Germany	
28	1:59.23		Mike Bruner	United States	18 July 1976	Olympic Games	Montreal, Canada	
29	1:58.21		Craig Beardsley	United States	30 July 1980	-	Irvine, United States	
30	1:58.01		Craig Beardsley	United States	22 August 1981	-	Kyiv, Soviet Union	
31	1:57.05		Michael Gross	West Germany	26 August 1983	European Championships	Rome, Italy	
32	1:57.04		Jon Sieben	Australia	3 August 1984	Olympic Games	Los Angeles, United States	
33	1:57.01		Michael Gross	West Germany	29 June 1985	West German Championships	Wuppertal, West Germany	
34	1:56.65		Michael Gross	West Germany	10 August 1985	European Championships	Sofia, Bulgaria	
35	1:56.24		Michael Gross	West Germany	28 June 1986	West German Championships	Hanover, West Germany	
36	1:55.69		Melvin Stewart	United States	12 January 1991	World Championships	Perth, Australia	
37	1:55.22		Denis Pankratov	Russia	14 June 1995	Mare Nostrum	Canet-en-Roussillon, France	
38	1:55.18		Tom Malchow	United States	17 June 2000	Charlotte UltraSwim	Charlotte, United States	
39	1:54.92		Michael Phelps	United States	30 March 2001	US Spring National Championships	Austin, United States	
40	1:54.58		Michael Phelps	United States	24 July 2001	World Championships	Fukuoka, Japan	
41	1:53.93	sf	Michael Phelps	United States	22 July 2003	World Championships	Barcelona, Spain	
42	1:53.80		Michael Phelps	United States	17 August 2006	Pan Pacific Championships	Victoria, Canada	
43	1:53.71		Michael Phelps	United States	17 February 2007	Missouri Grand Prix	Columbia, United States	
44	1:52.09		Michael Phelps	United States	28 March 2007	World Championships	Melbourne, Australia	
45	1:52.03		Michael Phelps	United States	13 August 2008	Olympic Games	Beijing, China	
46	1:51.51		Michael Phelps	United States	29 July 2009	World Championships	Rome, Italy	
47	1:50.73		Kristóf Milák	Hungary	24 July 2019	World Championships	Gwangju, South Korea	
48	1:50.34		Kristóf Milák	Hungary	21 June 2022	World Championships	Budapest, Hungary	

=== Men short course ===
#	Time	Name	Nationality	Date	Meet	Location	Ref
1	1:54.67	Franck Esposito	France	1 February 1992	-	Paris, France	
2	1:54.58	Danyon Loader	New Zealand	6 February 1993	World Cup	Paris, France	
3	1:54.50	Danyon Loader	New Zealand	9 February 1993	World Cup	Malmö, Sweden	
4	1:54.21	Danyon Loader	New Zealand	13 February 1993	World Cup	Gelsenkirchen, Germany	
5	1:53.05	Franck Esposito	France	26 March 1994	World Cup	Paris, France	
6	1:52.64	Denis Pankratov	Russia	2 February 1997	World Cup	Gelsenkirchen, Germany	
7	1:51.76	James Hickman	Great Britain	28 March 1998	World Cup	Paris, France	
8	1:51.58	Franck Esposito	France	14 January 2001	-	Paris, France	
9	1:51.21	Thomas Rupprath	Germany	1 December 2001	-	Rostock, Germany	
10	1:50.73	Franck Esposito	France	8 December 2002	-	Antibes, France	
11	1:50.60	Nikolay Skvortsov	Russia	13 December 2008	European Championships	Rijeka, Croatia	
12	1:50.53	Nikolay Skvortsov	Russia	15 February 2009	Russian Championships	Saint Petersburg, Russia	
13	1:49.11	Kaio de Almeida	Brazil	10 November 2009	World Cup	Stockholm, Sweden	
14	1:49.04	Chad le Clos	South Africa	7 August 2013	World Cup	Eindhoven, Netherlands	
15	1:48.56	Chad le Clos	South Africa	5 November 2013	World Cup	Singapore	
16	1:48.24	Daiya Seto	Japan	11 December 2018	World Championships	Hangzhou, China	
17	1:46.85	Tomoru Honda	Japan	22 October 2022	Japan Open	Tokyo, Japan	

=== Women long course ===
#	Time		Name	Nationality	Date	Meet	Location	Ref
1	2:40.5		Nancy Ramey	United States	29 June 1958	-	Los Angeles, United States	
2	2:38.9		Tineke Lagerberg	Netherlands	13 September 1958	-	Naarden, Netherlands	
3	2:37.0		Becky Collins	United States	19 July 1959	-	Redding, United States	
4	2:34.4		Marianne Heemskerk	Netherlands	12 June 1960	-	Leipzig, East Germany	
5	2:32.8		Becky Collins	United States	13 August 1961	-	Philadelphia, United States	
6	2:31.2		Sharon Finneran	United States	19 August 1962	-	Chicago, United States	
7	2:30.7		Sharon Finneran	United States	25 August 1962	-	Los Altos, United States	
8	2:29.1		Susan Pitt	United States	27 July 1963	-	Philadelphia, United States	
9	2:28.1		Sharon Stouder	United States	12 July 1964	-	Los Angeles, United States	
10	2:26.4		Sharon Stouder	United States	2 August 1964	-	Los Angeles, United States	
11	2:26.3		Kendis Moore	United States	15 August 1965	-	Maumee, United States	
12	2:25.8		Ada Kok	Netherlands	21 August 1965	-	Leiden, Netherlands	
13	2:25.3		Ada Kok	Netherlands	12 September 1965	-	Groningen, Netherlands	
14	2:22.5		Ada Kok	Netherlands	2 August 1967	-	Groningen, Netherlands	
15	2:21.0		Ada Kok	Netherlands	25 August 1967	-	Blackpool, United Kingdom	
16	2:20.7		Karen Moe	United States	11 July 1970	-	Santa Clara, United States	
17	2:19.3		Alice Jones	United States	22 August 1970	US National Championships	Los Angeles, United States	
18	2:18.6		Karen Moe	United States	7 August 1971	-	Santa Clara, United States	
19	2:18.4		Ellie Daniel	United States	28 August 1971	US National Championships	Houston, United States	
20	2:16.62		Karen Moe	United States	6 August 1972	US Olympic Trials	Chicago, United States	
21	2:15.57		Karen Moe	United States	4 September 1972	Olympic Games	Munich, West Germany	
22	2:15.45	h	Rosemarie Kother	East Germany	8 September 1973	World Championships	Belgrade, Yugoslavia	
23	2:13.76		Rosemarie Kother	East Germany	8 September 1973	World Championships	Belgrade, Yugoslavia	
24	2:13.60		Rosemarie Gabriel	East Germany	14 March 1976	Soviet Union vs East Germany Dual Meet	Tallinn, Soviet Union	
25	2:12.84		Rosemarie Gabriel	East Germany	4 June 1976	East German Championships	East Berlin, East Germany	
26	2:11.22		Rosemarie Gabriel	East Germany	5 June 1976	East German Championships	East Berlin, East Germany	
27	2:11.20		Andrea Pollack	East Germany	9 April 1978	-	Leningrad, Soviet Union	
28	2:09.87		Andrea Pollack	East Germany	4 July 1978	East German Championships	East Germany, East Germany	
28	2:09.87	=	Tracy Caulkins	United States	26 July 1978	World Championships	West Berlin, West Germany	
30	2:09.77		Mary T. Meagher	United States	7 July 1979	Pan American Games	San Juan, Puerto Rico	
31	2:08.41	h	Mary T. Meagher	United States	16 August 1979	US National Championships	Fort Lauderdale, United States	
32	2:07.01		Mary T. Meagher	United States	16 August 1979	US National Championships	Fort Lauderdale, United States	
33	2:06.37		Mary T. Meagher	United States	30 July 1980	US National Championships	Irvine, United States	
34	2:05.96		Mary T. Meagher	United States	13 August 1981	US National Championships	Brown Deer, United States	
35	2:05.81		Susie O'Neill	Australia	17 May 2000	Australian Championships	Sydney, Australia	
36	2:05.78		Otylia Jędrzejczak	Poland	4 August 2002	European Championships	Berlin, Germany	
37	2:05.61		Otylia Jędrzejczak	Poland	28 July 2005	World Championships	Montreal, Canada	
38	2:05.40		Jessicah Schipper	Australia	17 August 2006	Pan Pacific Championships	Victoria, Canada	
39	2:04.18		Liu Zige	China	14 August 2008	Olympic Games	Beijing, China	
40	2:04.14	h	Mary DeScenza	United States	29 July 2009	World Championships	Rome, Italy	
41	2:03.41		Jessicah Schipper	Australia	30 July 2009	World Championships	Rome, Italy	
42	2:01.81		Liu Zige	China	21 October 2009	Chinese National Games	Jinan, China	
43	2:01.65		Summer McIntosh	Canada	5 July 2026	Canadian Trials	Montreal, Canada	

=== Women short course ===
#	Time	Name	Nationality	Date	Meet	Location	Ref
1	2:05.37	Susie O'Neill	Australia	17 February 1999	World Cup	Malmö, Sweden	
2	2:04.43	Susie O'Neill	Australia	2 September 1999	Australian Championships	Canberra, Australia	
3	2:04.16	Susie O'Neill	Australia	18 January 2000	World Cup	Sydney, Australia	
4	2:04.04	Yang Yu	China	18 January 2004	World Cup	Berlin, Germany	
5	2:03.53	Otylia Jędrzejczak	Poland	13 December 2007	European Championships	Debrecen, Hungary	
6	2:03.12	Yuko Nakanishi	Japan	23 February 2008	Japan Open	Tokyo, Japan	
7	2:02.50	Liu Zige	China	11 November 2009	World Cup	Stockholm, Sweden	
8	2:00.78	Liu Zige	China	15 November 2009	World Cup	Berlin, Germany	
9	1:59.61	Mireia Belmonte	Spain	3 December 2014	World Championships	Doha, Qatar	
10	1:59.32	Summer McIntosh	Canada	12 December 2024	World Championships	Budapest, Hungary	

== All-time top 25 ==
Tables show data for two definitions of "Top 25" - the top 25 200 m butterfly times and the top 25 athletes:
- denotes top performance for athletes in the top 25 200 m butterfly times
- denotes lesser performances, still in the top 25 200 m butterfly times, by repeat athletes
- denotes top performance (only) for other top 25 athletes who fall outside the top 25 200 m butterfly times

=== Men long course ===
- Correct as of August 2026

Ath.#	Perf.#	Time	Athlete	Nation	Date	Place	Ref.
1	1	1:50.34	Kristóf Milák	Hungary	21 June 2022	Budapest	
	2	1:50.73	Milák #2		24 July 2019	Gwangju	
	3	1:51.10	Milák #3		19 May 2021	Budapest	
2	4	1:51.21	Léon Marchand	France	31 July 2024	Paris	
	5	1:51.25	Milák #4		28 July 2021	Tokyo	
	6	1:51.40	Milák #5		23 March 2021	Budapest	
3	7	1:51.51	Michael Phelps	United States	29 July 2009	Rome	
	8	1:51.72	Marchand #2		15 August 2026	Paris	
	9	1:51.75	Milák #6		31 July 2024	Paris	
4	10	1:51.87	Luca Urlando	United States	30 July 2025	Singapore	
	11	1:52.01	Milák #7		16 August 2022	Rome	
	12	1:52.03	Phelps #2		13 August 2008	Beijing	
	13	1:52.09	Phelps #3		28 March 2007	Melbourne	
	14	1:52.20	Phelps #4		2 July 2008	Omaha	
	15	1:52.22	Milák #8		27 July 2021	Tokyo	
	16	1:52.37	Urlando #2		4 April 2025	Sacramento	
	17	1:52.39	Milák #9		20 June 2022	Budapest	
	18	1:52.43	Marchand #3		26 July 2023	Fukuoka	
	19	1:52.50	Milák #10		23 March 2021	Budapest	
5	20	1:52.53	Daiya Seto	Japan	18 January 2020	Beijing	
	21	1:52.57	Marchand #4		6 December 2025	Austin	
	22	1:52.58	Milák #11		20 April 2023	Kaposvár	
6	23	1:52.64	Krzysztof Chmielewski	Poland	30 July 2025	Singapore	
7	24	1:52.70	László Cseh	Hungary	13 August 2008	Beijing	
7	24	1:52.70	Tomoru Honda	Japan	3 December 2022	Tokyo	
9		1:52.80	Ilya Kharun	Canada (Note: Ilya Kharun initially represented Canada, before switching his sporting citizenship to the US in October 2026.)	31 July 2024	Paris	
10		1:52.96	Chad le Clos	South Africa	31 July 2012	London	
11		1:52.97	Takeshi Matsuda	Japan	13 August 2008	Beijing	
12		1:53.23	Paweł Korzeniowski	Poland	29 July 2009	Rome	
13		1:53.40	Masato Sakai	Japan	9 August 2016	Rio de Janeiro	
14		1:53.42	Tamás Kenderesi	Hungary	27 March 2019	Debrecen	
15		1:53.64	Tyler Clary	United States	8 July 2009	Indianapolis	
16		1:53.67	Carson Foster	United States	7 July 2022	Austin	
16		1:53.67	Carson Foster	United States	12 August 2026	Irvine	
17		1:53.79	Nao Horomura	Japan	6 April 2018	Tokyo	
18		1:53.82	Thomas Heilman	United States	26 July 2023	Fukuoka	
19		1:53.86	Gil Stovall	United States	2 July 2008	Omaha	
20		1:53.92	Kaio de Almeida	Brazil	8 May 2009	Rio de Janeiro	
21		1:54.02	Chen Juner	China	29 July 2025	Singapore	
22		1:54.06	Richárd Márton	Hungary	15 August 2026	Paris	
23		1:54.07	Genki Terakado	Japan	21 March 2024	Tokyo	
24		1:54.10	Jan Świtkowski	Poland	5 August 2015	Kazan	
25		1:54.13	Apostolos Siskos	Greece	15 August 2026	Paris	

=== Men short course ===
- Correct as of November 2026

Ath.#	Perf.#	Time	Athlete	Nation	Date	Place	Ref.
1	1	1:46.85	Tomoru Honda	Japan	22 October 2022	Tokyo	
2	2	1:47.65	Luca Urlando	United States	30 October 2026	Westmont	
3	3	1:48.12	Ilya Kharun	United States	30 October 2026	Westmont	
4	4	1:48.24	Daiya Seto	Japan	11 December 2018	Hangzhou	
	4	1:48.24	Kharun #2		12 December 2024	Budapest	
4	4	1:48.24	Tyler Ray	United States	30 October 2026	Westmont	
6	7	1:48.27	Chad le Clos	South Africa	15 December 2022	Melbourne	
	8	1:48.32	le Clos #2		11 December 2018	Hangzhou	
	9	1:48.46	Kharun #3		18 October 2025	Westmont	
	10	1:48.56	le Clos #3		5 November 2013	Singapore	
7	10	1:48.56	Noè Ponti	Switzerland	14 November 2026	Lausanne	
	12	1:48.57	le Clos #4		22 November 2020	Budapest	
	13	1:48.61	le Clos #5		7 December 2014	Doha	
8	14	1:48.64	Alberto Razzetti	Italy	12 December 2024	Budapest	
9	15	1:48.66	Tom Shields	United States	22 November 2020	Budapest	
	16	1:48.67	le Clos #6		11 August 2017	Eindhoven	
	17	1:48.76	le Clos #7		6 December 2016	Windsor	
	18	1:48.77	Seto #2		21 December 2019	Las Vegas	
	18	1:48.77	Ponti #2		11 April 2025	Uster	
	20	1:48.88	le Clos #8		1 November 2014	Singapore	
	21	1:48.92	Seto #3		7 December 2014	Doha	
10	22	1:49.00	László Cseh	Hungary	6 December 2015	Netanya	
	23	1:49.02	Shields #2		16 November 2020	Budapest	
	24	1:49.04	le Clos #9		7 August 2013	Eindhoven	
	25	1:49.05	Shields #3		12 December 2015	Indianapolis	
11		1:49.11	Kaio de Almeida	Brazil	10 November 2009	Stockholm	
12		1:49.26	Krzysztof Chmielewski	Poland	12 December 2024	Budapest	
13		1:49.37	Chen Juner	China	2 October 2026	Baku	
14		1:49.46	Nikolay Skvortsov	Russia	12 December 2009	Istanbul	
15		1:49.50	Takeshi Matsuda	Japan	12 November 2011	Tokyo	
16		1:49.69	Trenton Julian	United States	29 October 2022	Toronto	
17		1:49.86	Kristóf Milák	Hungary	16 November 2022	Kaposvár	
18		1:49.89	Wang Kuan-hung	Chinese Taipei	16 November 2020	Budapest	
18		1:49.89	So Ogata	Japan	15 October 2026	Astana	
20		1:50.13	Paweł Korzeniowski	Poland	12 December 2009	Istanbul	
21		1:50.23	Andreas Vazaios	Greece	8 December 2019	Glasgow	
22		1:50.26	Teppei Morimoto	Japan	15 December 2022	Melbourne	
23		1:50.28	Hidemasa Sano	Japan	11 February 2012	Tokyo	
24		1:50.30	Michal Chmielewski	Poland	7 December 2025	Lublin	
25		1:50.32	Dinko Jukić	Austria	12 December 2009	Istanbul	

=== Women long course ===
- Correct as of September 2026

Ath.#	Perf.#	Time	Athlete	Nation	Date	Place	Ref.
1	1	2:01.65	Summer McIntosh	Canada	5 July 2026	Montreal	
2	2	2:01.81	Liu Zige	China	21 October 2009	Jinan	
	3	2:01.99	McIntosh #2		31 July 2025	Singapore	
	4	2:02.26	McIntosh #3		10 June 2025	Victoria	
	5	2:02.62	McIntosh #4		6 December 2025	Austin	
	6	2:03.03	McIntosh #5		1 August 2024	Paris	
3	7	2:03.41	Jessicah Schipper	Australia	30 July 2009	Rome	
4	8	2:03.84	Regan Smith	United States	1 August 2024	Paris	
5	9	2:03.86	Zhang Yufei	China	29 July 2021	Tokyo	
	10	2:03.87	Smith #2		4 June 2023	Tempe	
	11	2:03.90	Liu #2		30 July 2009	Rome	
	12	2:04.00	McIntosh #6		6 March 2025	Westmont	
6	13	2:04.06	Jiao Liuyang	China	1 August 2012	London	
	13	2:04.06	McIntosh #7		26 July 2023	Fukuoka	
	13	2:04.06	McIntosh #8		6 June 2026	Austin	
7	16	2:04.14	Mary DeScenza	United States	29 July 2009	Rome	
	17	2:04.18	Liu #3		14 August 2008	Beijing	
8	18	2:04.27	Katinka Hosszú	Hungary	29 July 2009	Rome	
	19	2:04.28	Hosszú #2		30 July 2009	Rome	
	20	2:04.33	DeScenza #2		29 July 2009	Rome	
	20	2:04.33	McIntosh #9		28 May 2024	Toronto	
	22	2:04.40	Liu #4		6 April 2011	Wuhan	
	23	2:04.41	DeScenza #3		30 July 2009	Rome	
	24	2:04.44	Jiao #2		6 April 2011	Wuhan	
	25	2:04.50	Jiao #3		30 July 2009	Rome	
9		2:04.69	Natsumi Hoshi	Japan	5 April 2012	Tokyo	
10		2:04.78	Mireia Belmonte	Spain	1 August 2013	Barcelona	
11		2:04.83	Ellen Gandy	Great Britain (Note: Ellen Gandy initially represented Great Britain, before switching her sporting citizenship to Australia in December 2012.)	16 March 2009	Sheffield	
12		2:04.88	Madeline Groves	Australia	10 August 2016	Rio de Janeiro	
13		2:04.95	Elizabeth Dekkers	Australia	11 June 2026	Sydney	
14		2:05.08	Yu Zidi	China	20 September 2026	Tokyo	
15		2:05.09	Aurore Mongel	France	29 July 2009	Rome	
16		2:05.20	Tess Howley	United States	22 July 2025	Berlin	
17		2:05.26	Franziska Hentke	Germany	3 July 2015	Essen	
18		2:05.36	Jemma Lowe	Great Britain	17 June 2011	Sheffield	
19		2:05.38	Gong Jie	China	6 April 2012	Shaoxing	
20		2:05.45	Alys Thomas	Great Britain	9 April 2018	Gold Coast	
20		2:05.45	Chen Luying	China	14 November 2025	Shenzhen	
22		2:05.61	Otylia Jędrzejczak	Poland	28 July 2005	Montreal	
23		2:05.62	Suzuka Hasegawa	Japan	30 August 2020	Tokyo	
24		2:05.65	Hali Flickinger	United States	29 July 2021	Tokyo	
25		2:05.78	Kathleen Hersey	United States	1 August 2012	London	

=== Women short course ===
- Correct as of October 2025

Ath.#	Perf.#	Time	Athlete	Nation	Date	Place	Ref.
1	1	1:59.32	Summer McIntosh	Canada	12 December 2024	Budapest	
2	2	1:59.61	Mireia Belmonte	Spain	3 December 2014	Doha	
3	3	2:00.20	Regan Smith	United States	17 October 2025	Westmont	
	4	2:00.28	Smith #2		10 October 2025	Carmel	
	5	2:00.34	Smith #3		23 October 2025	Toronto	
4	6	2:00.78	Liu Zige	China	15 November 2009	Berlin	
	7	2:00.87	Smith #4		29 October 2026	Westmont	
	8	2:01.00	Smith #5		12 December 2024	Budapest	
5	9	2:01.12	Katinka Hosszú	Hungary	3 December 2014	Doha	
	10	2:01.52	Belmonte #2		12 December 2013	Herning	
	11	2:01.60	Hosszú #2		12 December 2018	Hangzhou	
6	12	2:01.73	Kelsi Dahlia	United States	12 December 2018	Hangzhou	
	13	2:01.85	Smith #6		18 October 2024	Shanghai	
	14	2:01.96	McIntosh #2		12 December 2024	Budapest	
	15	2:02.15	Hosszú #3		7 December 2016	Windsor	
	16	2:02.20	Hosszú #4		12 December 2012	Istanbul	
	17	2:02.21	Hosszú #5		20 December 2013	Saint Petersburg	
7	18	2:02.28	Jiao Liuyang	China	12 December 2012	Istanbul	
8	19	2:02.36	Ellen Walshe	Ireland	23 October 2025	Toronto	
	20	2:02.40	Hosszú #6		20 December 2013	Saint Petersburg	
	21	2:02.42	Hosszú #7		3 December 2014	Doha	
	22	2:02.50	Liu #2		11 November 2009	Stockholm	
9	23	2:02.51	Alex Shackell	United States	10 October 2025	Carmel	
10	24	2:02.52	Chen Luying	China	26 September 2024	Wuhan	
	25	2:02.71	Chen #2		18 October 2024	Shanghai	
11		2:02.75	Yu Yiting	China	8 October 2026	Tashkent	
12		2:02.88	Ellen Gandy	Australia	22 August 2013	Sydney	
13		2:02.91	Elizabeth Dekkers	Australia	12 December 2024	Budapest	
14		2:02.96	Suzuka Hasegawa	Japan	14 January 2017	Tokyo	
15		2:03.01	Franziska Hentke	Germany	4 December 2015	Netanya	
15		2:03.01	Zhang Yufei	China	17 December 2021	Abu Dhabi	
17		2:03.08	Madeline Groves	Australia	28 November 2015	Sydney	
18		2:03.12	Yuko Nakanishi	Japan	23 February 2008	Tokyo	
19		2:03.13	Laura Lahtinen	Finland	18 October 2024	Shanghai	
19		2:03.13	Bella Grant	Australia	24 October 2024	Incheon	
21		2:03.19	Jemma Lowe	Great Britain	12 December 2012	Istanbul	
22		2:03.20	Audrey Lacroix	Canada	6 August 2009	Leeds	
23		2:03.22	Aurore Mongel	France	10 December 2009	Istanbul	
24		2:03.25	Brianna Throssell	Australia	28 November 2015	Sydney	
25		2:03.27	Jessicah Schipper	Australia	22 November 2009	Singapore	

== Olympic champions ==
=== Men ===
Edition	Winner	Time	Notes	Ref.
(Australia) Melbourne 1956	William Yorzyk (USA)	2:19.3		
(Italy) Rome 1960	Mike Troy (USA)	2:12.8	WR	
(Japan) Tokyo 1964	Kevin Berry (AUS)	2:06.6	WR	
Mexico City 1968	Carl Robie (USA)	2:08.7		
(West Germany) Munich 1972	Mark Spitz (USA)	2:00.70	WR	
(Canada) Montreal 1976	Mike Bruner (USA)	1:59.23	WR	
(Soviet Union) Moscow 1980	Sergey Fesenko Sr. (URS)	1:59.76		
(United States) Los Angeles 1984	Jon Sieben (AUS)	1:57.04	WR	
(South Korea) Seoul 1988	Michael Gross (FRG)	1:56.94	OR	
(Spain) Barcelona 1992	Melvin Stewart (USA)	1:56.26	OR	
(United States) Atlanta 1996	Denis Pankratov (RUS)	1:56.51		
(Australia) Sydney 2000	Tom Malchow (USA)	1:55.35	OR	
(Greece) Athens 2004	Michael Phelps (USA)	1:54.04	OR	
(China) Beijing 2008	Michael Phelps (USA)	1:52.03	WR	
(United Kingdom) London 2012	Chad le Clos (RSA)	1:52.96		
(Brazil) Rio de Janeiro 2016	Michael Phelps (USA)	1:53.36		
(Japan) Tokyo 2020	Kristóf Milák (HUN)	1:51.25	OR	
(France) Paris 2024	Léon Marchand (FRA)	1:51.21	OR	

=== Women ===
Edition	Winner	Time	Notes	Ref.
Mexico City 1968	Ada Kok (NED)	2:24.7	OR	
(West Germany) Munich 1972	Karen Moe (USA)	2:15.57	WR	
(Canada) Montreal 1976	Andrea Pollack (GDR)	2:11.41	OR	
(Soviet Union) Moscow 1980	Ines Geissler (GDR)	2:10.44	OR	
(United States) Los Angeles 1984	Mary T. Meagher (USA)	2:06.90	OR	
(South Korea) Seoul 1988	Kathleen Nord (GDR)	2:09.51		
(Spain) Barcelona 1992	Summer Sanders (USA)	2:08.67		
(United States) Atlanta 1996	Susie O'Neill (AUS)	2:07.76		
(Australia) Sydney 2000	Misty Hyman (USA)	2:05.88	OR	
(Greece) Athens 2004	Otylia Jędrzejczak (POL)	2:06.05		
(China) Beijing 2008	Liu Zige (CHN)	2:04.18	WR	
(United Kingdom) London 2012	Jiao Liuyang (CHN)	2:04.06	OR	
(Brazil) Rio de Janeiro 2016	Mireia Belmonte (ESP)	2:04.85		
(Japan) Tokyo 2020	Zhang Yufei (CHN)	2:03.86	OR	
(France) Paris 2024	Summer McIntosh (CAN)	2:03.03	OR	

== World champions (long course) ==
=== Men ===
Edition	Winner	Time	Notes	Ref.
(Socialist Federal Republic of Yugoslavia) Belgrade 1973	Robin Backhaus (USA)	2:03.32	CR	
(Colombia) Cali 1975	Bill Forrester (USA)	2:01.95	CR	
(West Germany) West Berlin 1978	Mike Bruner (USA)	1:59.38	CR	
(Ecuador) Guayaquil 1982	Michael Gross (FRG)	1:58.85	CR	
(Spain) Madrid 1986	Michael Gross (FRG)	1:56.53	CR	
(Australia) Perth 1991	Melvin Stewart (USA)	1:55.69	WR	
(Italy) Rome 1994	Denis Pankratov (RUS)	1:56.54		
(Australia) Perth 1998	Denys Sylantyev (UKR)	1:56.61		
(Japan) Fukuoka 2001	Michael Phelps (USA)	1:54.58	WR	
(Spain) Barcelona 2003	Michael Phelps (USA)	1:54.35	(Note: Michael Phelps set a world record of 1:53.93 in the semifinals.)	
(Canada) Montreal 2005	Paweł Korzeniowski (POL)	1:55.02		
(Australia) Melbourne 2007	Michael Phelps (USA)	1:52.09	WR	
(Italy) Rome 2009	Michael Phelps (USA)	1:51.51	WR	
(China) Shanghai 2011	Michael Phelps (USA)	1:53.34		
(Spain) Barcelona 2013	Chad le Clos (RSA)	1:54.32		
(Russia) Kazan 2015	László Cseh (HUN)	1:53.48		
(Hungary) Budapest 2017	Chad le Clos (RSA)	1:53.33		
(South Korea) Gwangju 2019	Kristóf Milák (HUN)	1:50.73	WR	
(Hungary) Budapest 2022	Kristóf Milák (HUN)	1:50.34	WR	
(Japan) Fukuoka 2023	Léon Marchand (FRA)	1:52.43		
(Qatar) Doha 2024	Tomoru Honda (JPN)	1:53.88		
Singapore 2025	Luca Urlando (USA)	1:51.87		

=== Women ===
Edition	Winner	Time	Notes	Ref.
(Socialist Federal Republic of Yugoslavia) Belgrade 1973	Rosemarie Kother (GDR)	2:13.76	WR	
(Colombia) Cali 1975	Rosemarie Kother (GDR)	2:13.82		
(West Germany) West Berlin 1978	Tracy Caulkins (USA)	2:09.87	=WR	
(Ecuador) Guayaquil 1982	Ines Geissler (GDR)	2:08.66	CR	
(Spain) Madrid 1986	Mary T. Meagher (USA)	2:08.41	CR	
(Australia) Perth 1991	Summer Sanders (USA)	2:09.24		
(Italy) Rome 1994	Liu Limin (CHN)	2:07.25	CR	
(Australia) Perth 1998	Susie O'Neill (AUS)	2:07.93		
(Japan) Fukuoka 2001	Petria Thomas (AUS)	2:06.73	CR	
(Spain) Barcelona 2003	Otylia Jędrzejczak (POL)	2:07.56		
(Canada) Montreal 2005	Otylia Jędrzejczak (POL)	2:05.61	WR	
(Australia) Melbourne 2007	Jessicah Schipper (AUS)	2:06.39		
(Italy) Rome 2009	Jessicah Schipper (AUS)	2:03.41	WR	
(China) Shanghai 2011	Jiao Liuyang (CHN)	2:05.55		
(Spain) Barcelona 2013	Liu Zige (CHN)	2:04.59		
(Russia) Kazan 2015	Natsumi Hoshi (JPN)	2:05.56		
(Hungary) Budapest 2017	Mireia Belmonte (ESP)	2:05.26		
(South Korea) Gwangju 2019	Boglárka Kapás (HUN)	2:06.78		
(Hungary) Budapest 2022	Summer McIntosh (CAN)	2:05.20		
(Japan) Fukuoka 2023	Summer McIntosh (CAN)	2:04.06		
(Qatar) Doha 2024	Laura Stephens (GBR)	2:07.35		
Singapore 2025	Summer McIntosh (CAN)	2:01.99	CR	

== World champions (short course) ==
=== Men ===
Edition	Winner	Time	Notes	Ref.
(Spain) Palma de Mallorca 1993	Franck Esposito (FRA)	1:55.42	CR	
(Brazil) Rio de Janeiro 1995	Scott Goodman (AUS)	1:54.79	CR	
(Sweden) Gothenburg 1997	James Hickman (GBR)	1:55.55		
Hong Kong 1999	James Hickman (GBR)	1:52.71	CR	
(Greece) Athens 2000	James Hickman (GBR)	1:53.57		
(Russia) Moscow 2002	James Hickman (GBR)	1:53.14		
(United States) Indianapolis 2004	James Hickman (GBR)	1:53.41		
(China) Shanghai 2006	Wu Peng (CHN)	1:52.36	CR	
(United Kingdom) Manchester 2008	Moss Burmester (NZL)	1:51.05	CR	
(United Arab Emirates) Dubai 2010	Chad le Clos (RSA)	1:51.56		
(Turkey) Istanbul 2012	Kazuya Kaneda (JPN)	1:51.01	CR	
(Qatar) Doha 2014	Chad le Clos (RSA)	1:48.61	CR	
(Canada) Windsor 2016	Chad le Clos (RSA)	1:48.76		
(China) Hangzhou 2018	Daiya Seto (JPN)	1:48.24	WR	
(United Arab Emirates) Abu Dhabi 2021	Alberto Razzetti (ITA)	1:49.06		
(Australia) Melbourne 2022	Chad le Clos (RSA)	1:48.27		
(Hungary) Budapest 2024	Ilya Kharun (CAN)	1:48.24	=CR	

=== Women ===
Edition	Winner	Time	Notes	Ref.
(Spain) Palma de Mallorca 1993	Liu Limin (CHN)	2:08.51	CR	
(Brazil) Rio de Janeiro 1995	Susie O'Neill (AUS)	2:06.18	CR	
(Sweden) Gothenburg 1997	Liu Limin (CHN)	2:07.20		
Hong Kong 1999	Mette Jacobsen (DEN)	2:06.52		
(Greece) Athens 2000	Mette Jacobsen (DEN)	2:08.10		
(Russia) Moscow 2002	Petria Thomas (AUS)	2:05.76	CR	
(United States) Indianapolis 2004	Kaitlin Sandeno (USA)	2:06.95		
(China) Shanghai 2006	Jessicah Schipper (AUS)	2:05.11	CR	
(United Kingdom) Manchester 2008	Mary DeScenza (USA)	2:04.27	CR	
(United Arab Emirates) Dubai 2010	Mireia Belmonte (ESP)	2:03.59	CR	
(Turkey) Istanbul 2012	Katinka Hosszú (HUN)	2:02.20	CR	
(Qatar) Doha 2014	Mireia Belmonte (ESP)	1:59.61	WR	
(Canada) Windsor 2016	Katinka Hosszú (HUN)	2:02.15		
(China) Hangzhou 2018	Katinka Hosszú (HUN)	2:01.60		
(United Arab Emirates) Abu Dhabi 2021	Zhang Yufei (CHN)	2:03.01		
(Australia) Melbourne 2022	Dakota Luther (USA)	2:03.37		
(Hungary) Budapest 2024	Summer McIntosh (CAN)	1:59.32	WR	
