= Swimming at the 2009 World Aquatics Championships – Men's 200 metre butterfly =

Men's 200 metre butterfly at the 2009 FINA World Championships
- Venue: Foro Italico
- Dates: 28 July 2009 (heats, semifinals); 29 July 2009 (final)
- Competitors: 75
- Winning time: 1:51.51 WR

Medalists
| gold medal | Michael Phelps | United States |
| silver medal | Paweł Korzeniowski | Poland |
| bronze medal | Takeshi Matsuda | Japan |

The heats for the men's 200 metre butterfly race at the 2009 World Championships took place in the morning of 28 July, with the final in the evening session of 29 July at the Foro Italico in Rome, Italy.

== Records ==
Prior to this competition, the existing world and competition records were as follows:

| World record | Michael Phelps (USA) | 1:52.03 | Beijing, China | 13 August 2008 |
| Championship record | Michael Phelps (USA) | 1:52.09 | Melbourne, Australia | 28 March 2007 |

The following records were established during the competition:

| Date | Round | Name | Nationality | Time | Record |
|---|---|---|---|---|---|
| 29 July | Final | Michael Phelps | United States | 1:51.51 | WR |

== Results ==
=== Heats ===
| Rank | Name | Nationality | Time | Heat | Lane | Notes |
|---|---|---|---|---|---|---|
| 1 | Paweł Korzeniowski | Poland | 1:54.33 | 6 | 6 | |
| 2 | Michael Phelps | United States | 1:54.35 | 8 | 4 | |
| 3 | Tyler Clary | United States | 1:54.42 | 6 | 4 | |
| 4 | Sebastien Rousseau | South Africa | 1:54.51 | 6 | 3 | AF |
| 5 | Kaio de Almeida | Brazil | 1:54.57 | 8 | 5 | |
| 6 | Nikolay Skvortsov | Russia | 1:55.07 | 6 | 5 | |
| 7 | Dinko Jukić | Austria | 1:55.45 | 7 | 6 | |
| 8 | Chen Yin | China | 1:55.49 | 8 | 1 | |
| 9 | Michael Rock | Great Britain | 1:55.76 | 8 | 6 | |
| 10 | Wu Peng | China | 1:55.96 | 8 | 3 | |
| 11 | Moss Burmester | New Zealand | 1:56.03 | 7 | 5 | |
| 12 | Takeshi Matsuda | Japan | 1:56.10 | 7 | 4 | |
| 13 | Lucas Salatta | Brazil | 1:56.16 | 8 | 7 | |
| 14 | Pedro Oliveira | Portugal | 1:56.17 | 6 | 1 | |
| 15 | Joeri Verlinden | Netherlands | 1:56.59 | 8 | 8 | NR |
| 16 | Ryusuke Sakata | Japan | 1:56.75 | 7 | 3 | |
| 17 | Chad le Clos | South Africa | 1:56.90 | 7 | 8 | |
| 18 | Simon Sjödin | Sweden | 1:57.01 | 8 | 0 | NR |
| 19 | Gal Nevo | Israel | 1:57.02 | 4 | 5 | NR |
| 20 | Omar Pinzón | Colombia | 1:57.13 | 6 | 9 | NR |
| 21 | Francesco Vespe | Italy | 1:57.16 | 8 | 2 | |
| 22 | Lachlan Staples | Australia | 1:57.21 | 7 | 1 | |
| 23 | Stefan Hirniak | Canada | 1:57.43 | 5 | 9 | NR |
| 23 | Diogo Carvalho | Portugal | 1:57.43 | 7 | 7 | |
| 25 | Joseph Roebuck | Great Britain | 1:57.44 | 6 | 8 | |
| 26 | Marcin Babuchowski | Poland | 1:57.53 | 5 | 6 | |
| 27 | Christopher Wright | Australia | 1:57.54 | 6 | 7 | |
| 28 | Hsu Chi-Chieh | Chinese Taipei | 1:57.61 | 7 | 2 | |
| 29 | Alexandru Felix Maestru | Romania | 1:57.97 | 5 | 7 | |
| 30 | Illya Chuyev | Ukraine | 1:58.40 | 7 | 0 | |
| 31 | Jan Šefl | Czech Republic | 1:58.46 | 7 | 9 | |
| 32 | Yu Jeongnam | South Korea | 1:58.56 | 5 | 4 | |
| 33 | Pablo Marmolejo | Mexico | 1:58.59 | 5 | 8 | |
| 34 | Denys Dubrov | Ukraine | 1:58.96 | 5 | 1 | |
| 35 | Daniel Bego | Malaysia | 1:58.99 | 4 | 6 | |
| 36 | Mathieu Fonteyn | Belgium | 1:59.40 | 6 | 2 | |
| 37 | Norbert Kovács | Hungary | 1:59.64 | 4 | 3 | |
| 38 | Israel Duran | Mexico | 1:59.86 | 4 | 4 | |
| 39 | Douglas Lennox-Silva | Puerto Rico | 2:01.01 | 4 | 7 | |
| 40 | Andrés José González | Argentina | 2:01.30 | 8 | 9 | |
| 41 | Anders Mcintyre | Canada | 2:01.56 | 5 | 2 | |
| 42 | Emmanuel Crescimbeni | Peru | 2:01.57 | 4 | 1 | |
| 43 | Alon Mandel | Israel | 2:01.79 | 5 | 5 | |
| 44 | Bernhard Wolf | Austria | 2:01.90 | 5 | 3 | |
| 45 | Rehan Poncha | India | 2:02.27 | 4 | 8 | |
| 46 | Norbert Trudman | Slovakia | 2:02.83 | 4 | 9 | |
| 47 | Stefanos Dimitriadis | Greece | 2:02.84 | 5 | 0 | |
| 48 | Sergey Pankov | Uzbekistan | 2:03.33 | 3 | 3 | |
| 49 | Nguyen Vo Thai | Vietnam | 2:03.55 | 3 | 8 | |
| 50 | Pedro Pinotes | Angola | 2:03.68 | 3 | 9 | |
| 51 | Pavel Sankovich | Belarus | 2:03.76 | 3 | 4 | |
| 52 | Joel Romeu | Uruguay | 2:03.80 | 3 | 6 | NR |
| 53 | Ng Kai Wee Rainer | Singapore | 2:03.83 | 3 | 0 | |
| 54 | Dmitriy Gordiyenko | Kazakhstan | 2:04.05 | 3 | 5 | |
| 55 | Diego Castillo | Panama | 2:04.71 | 3 | 2 | |
| 56 | Endi Babi | Albania | 2:05.65 | 3 | 7 | |
| 57 | Javier Hernández Maradiaga | Honduras | 2:05.99 | 4 | 0 | |
| 58 | Roy Felipe Barahona Fuentes | Honduras | 2:06.92 | 3 | 1 | |
| 59 | Andrejs Dūda | Latvia | 2:06.94 | 2 | 3 | |
| 60 | Bojan Jovanov | Macedonia | 2:07.34 | 1 | 2 | |
| 61 | Robert Walsh | Philippines | 2:08.17 | 2 | 6 | |
| 62 | Sim Ri Jin Nicholas | Singapore | 2:09.54 | 2 | 5 | |
| 63 | Sobitjon Amilov | Uzbekistan | 2:09.98 | 2 | 4 | |
| 64 | Ryan Nelthropp | United States Virgin Islands | 2:11.56 | 2 | 1 | |
| 65 | Kaspar Raigla | Estonia | 2:13.37 | 2 | 8 | |
| 66 | Aleksei Klimenko | Kyrgyzstan | 2:13.40 | 2 | 7 | |
| 67 | Alejandro Madde Madd | Bolivia | 2:14.11 | 2 | 0 | |
| 68 | Ali Al Kaabi | United Arab Emirates | 2:15.52 | 2 | 9 | NR |
| 69 | Favio Persano | Paraguay | 2:16.08 | 2 | 2 | |
| 70 | Jean Marie Froget | Mauritius | 2:16.82 | 1 | 4 | |
| 71 | Benjamin Gabbard | American Samoa | 2:18.37 | 1 | 3 | |
| 72 | Kareem Ennab | Jordan | 2:19.51 | 1 | 5 | |
| 73 | Paul Elaisa | Fiji | 2:22.25 | 1 | 6 | |
| – | Shaune Fraser | Cayman Islands | DNS | 4 | 2 | |
| – | Romanos Alyfantis | Greece | DNS | 6 | 9 | |

=== Semifinals ===
| Rank | Name | Nationality | Time | Heat | Lane | Notes |
|---|---|---|---|---|---|---|
| 1 | Takeshi Matsuda | Japan | 1:53.35 | 1 | 7 | |
| 2 | Michael Phelps | United States | 1:53.48 | 1 | 4 | |
| 3 | Paweł Korzeniowski | Poland | 1:53.75 | 2 | 4 | NR |
| 4 | Dinko Jukić | Austria | 1:54.42 | 2 | 6 | NR |
| 5 | Kaio de Almeida | Brazil | 1:54.50 | 2 | 3 | |
| 6 | Michael Rock | Great Britain | 1:54.58 | 2 | 2 | NR |
| 7 | Sebastien Rousseau | South Africa | 1:54.71 | 1 | 5 | |
| 8 | Tyler Clary | United States | 1:54.75 | 2 | 5 | |
| 9 | Chen Yin | China | 1:54.85 | 1 | 6 | |
| 10 | Nikolay Skvortsov | Russia | 1:55.10 | 1 | 3 | |
| 11 | Moss Burmester | New Zealand | 1:55.35 | 2 | 7 | |
| 12 | Wu Peng | China | 1:55.73 | 1 | 2 | |
| 13 | Ryusuke Sakata | Japan | 1:55.91 | 1 | 8 | |
| 14 | Pedro Oliveira | Portugal | 1:56.25 | 1 | 1 | |
| 15 | Joeri Verlinden | Netherlands | 1:56.74 | 2 | 8 | |
| 16 | Lucas Salatta | Brazil | 1:57.17 | 2 | 1 | |

=== Final ===
| Rank | Name | Nationality | Time | Lane | Notes |
|---|---|---|---|---|---|
| 1st place, gold medalist(s) | Michael Phelps | United States | 1:51.51 | 5 | WR |
| 2nd place, silver medalist(s) | Paweł Korzeniowski | Poland | 1:53.23 | 3 | NR |
| 3rd place, bronze medalist(s) | Takeshi Matsuda | Japan | 1:53.32 | 4 | |
| 4 | Kaio de Almeida | Brazil | 1:54.27 | 2 | |
| 5 | Tyler Clary | United States | 1:54.45 | 8 | |
| 6 | Dinko Jukić | Austria | 1:55.08 | 6 | |
| 7 | Sebastien Rousseau | South Africa | 1:55.43 | 1 | |
| 7 | Michael Rock | Great Britain | 1:55.43 | 7 | |

== See also ==
- Swimming at the 2007 World Aquatics Championships – Men's 200 metre butterfly
- Swimming at the 2008 Summer Olympics – Men's 200 metre butterfly
