= Swimming at the 2005 World Aquatics Championships – Men's 200 metre butterfly =

Men's 200m butterfly at the 2005 FINA World Aquatics Championships
- Dates: 26 July (heats and semifinals); 27 July (final)
- Competitors: 44 from 31 nations
- Winning time: 1 minute 55.02 seconds

Medalists
gold medal	Paweł Korzeniowski	Poland
silver medal	Takeshi Matsuda	Japan
bronze medal	Wu Peng	China

The Men's 200 Butterfly event at the 11th FINA World Aquatics Championships was swum on 26 – 27 July 2005 in Montreal, Canada. The Preliminary and Semifinal heats were on 26 July; the final was held on 27 July.

As the Championships were swum in a long course pool, this race consisted of 4 lengths of the pool, butterfly.

At the start of the event, the existing World (WR) and Championships records were:

- 1:53.93, Michael Phelps (USA), Barcelona, Spain, 22 July 2003.

== Results ==
=== Final ===
Place	Swimmer	Nation	Time	Notes
1	Paweł Korzeniowski	Poland	1:55.02	
2	Takeshi Matsuda	Japan	1:55.62	
3	Wu Peng	China	1:56.50	
4	Davis Tarwater	USA	1:56.74	
5	Nikolay Skvortsov	Russia	1:57.04	
5	Ryuichi Shibata	Japan	1:57.04	
7	Helge Meeuw	Germany	1:57.67	
8	Ioannis Drymonakos	Greece	1:57.71	

=== Semifinals ===
Rank	Heat+Lane	Swimmer	Nation	Time	Notes
1	S2 L5	Paweł Korzeniowski	Poland	1:56.11	q
2	S2 L2	Takeshi Matsuda	Japan	1:56.14	q
3	S2 L3	WU Peng	China	1:56.33	q
4	S1 L3	Nikolay Skvortsov	Russia	1:56.88	q
5	S1 L1	Helge Meeuw	Germany	1:57.07	q
6	S1 L6	Ioannis Drymonakos	Greece	1:57.09	q
7	S1 L5	Davis Tarwater	USA	1:57.16	q
8	S2 L4	Ryuichi Shibata	Japan	1:57.36	q
9	S1 L4	Travis Nederpelt	Australia	1:57.46	
10	S2 L1	Sergii Advena	Ukraine	1:57.91	
11	S2 L8	Ioan Gherghel	Romania	1:57.97	
12	S2 L7	Denys Sylantyev	Ukraine	1:58.20	
13	S1 L2	Moss Burmester	New Zealand	1:58.24	
14	S1 L8	Kaio Almeida	Brazil	1:58.36	
15	S2 L6	Anatoly Polyakov	Russia	1:58.39	
16	S1 L7	Jeong Nam Yu	South Korea	1:59.25	

=== Preliminaries ===
Rank	Heat+Lane	Swimmer	Nation	Time	Notes
1	H6 L3	Ryuichi Shibata	Japan	1:56.60	q
2	H5 L3	Travis Nederpelt	Australia	1:56.91	q
3	H5 L4	Paweł Korzeniowski	Poland	1:56.93	q
4	H6 L7	Davis Tarwater	United States	1:57.17	q
5	H5 L5	Peng Wu	China	1:57.44	q
6	H6 L4	Nikolay Skvortsov	Russia	1:57.47	q
7	H5 L6	Anatoly Polyakov	Russia	1:57.57	q
8	H6 L6	Ioannis Drymonakos	Greece	1:57.82	q
9	H6 L5	Takeshi Matsuda	Japan	1:57.90	q
10	H4 L6	Moss Burmester	New Zealand	1:58.30	q
11	H6 L2	Denys Sylantyev	Ukraine	1:58.80	q
12	H6 L1	Yoo Jung-Nam	South Korea	1:58.89	q
13	H4 L2	Sergii Advena	Ukraine	1:58.93	q
14	H4 L5	Helge Meeuw	Germany	1:58.95	q
15	H4 L4	Ioan Gherghel	Romania	1:59.09	q
16	H4 L7	Kaio Almeida	Brazil	1:59.20	q
17	H5 L7	Michael Raab	United States	1:59.38	
18	H5 L1	Luís Monteiro	Portugal	2:00.08	
19	H5 L8	Joao Araujo	Portugal	2:00.17	
20	H4 L1	Erez Feren	Israel	2:00.33	
21	H5 L2	Benjamin Starke	Germany	2:00.40	
22	H4 L3	Andrew Richards	Australia	2:00.52	
23	H3 L5	Nadav Kochavi	Israel	2:01.44	
24	H6 L8	Yong Chung	South Korea	2:01.73	
25	H2 L7	Shaune Fraser	Cayman Islands	2:01.88	
26	H3 L1	Pavel Suškov	Lithuania	2:02.77	
27	H3 L4	Georgi Palazov	Bulgaria	2:03.86	
28	H3 L2	Jiri Dub	Czech Republic	2:04.27	
29	H2 L4	James Walsh	Philippines	2:04.50	
30	H2 L1	Oleg Lyashko	Uzbekistan	2:04.74	
31	H3 L6	Aghiles Slimani	Algeria	2:05.08	
32	H4 L8	Hsu Chi-Chieh	Chinese Taipei	2:05.30	
33	H3 L8	Julio Galofre	Colombia	2:05.72	
34	H3 L7	Gary Tan	Singapore	2:05.93	
35	H2 L3	Dominik Bartos	Czech Republic	2:06.49	
36	H2 L2	Mansoor Al-Mansoor	Kuwait	2:06.52	
37	H1 L4	M. Akbar Nasution	Indonesia	2:07.05	
38	H1 L5	Sergey Pankov	Uzbekistan	2:07.40	
39	H2 L6	Cheng Xun Ng	Singapore	2:07.98	
40	H2 L8	Waleed Al-Qahtani	Kuwait	2:09.55	
41	H1 L6	Wing Cheun Wong	Macau	2:10.44	
42	H2 L5	Nguyen Thanh Hai	Vietnam	2:10.57	
43	H1 L3	Scott Hensley	Virgin Islands	2:15.70	
-	H3 L3	Ahmed Salah	Egypt	DNS	
