= Swimming at the 2008 Summer Olympics – Men's 200 metre butterfly =

Men's 200 metre butterfly at the Games of the XXIX Olympiad
- Venue: Beijing National Aquatics Center
- Date: August 11, 2008 (heats); August 12, 2008 (semifinals); August 13, 2008 (final)
- Competitors: 44 from 39 nations
- Winning time: 1:52.03 WR

Medalists
1st place, gold medalist(s)		Michael Phelps	United States
2nd place, silver medalist(s)		László Cseh	Hungary
3rd place, bronze medalist(s)		Takeshi Matsuda	Japan

The men's 200 metre butterfly event at the 2008 Olympic Games took place on 11–13 August at the Beijing National Aquatics Center in Beijing, China.

U.S. swimmer Michael Phelps blasted a new world record of 1:52.03 to defend his title in the event, and more importantly, claim his fourth Olympic gold, tenth career, and twelfth overall medal. During the final, Phelps' goggles filled with water, which prevented him from seeing anything, while he was finishing the second lap.

Hungary's László Cseh added a second silver to his hardware from the 400 m individual medley, breaking a European record of 1:52.70. Japan's Takeshi Matsuda powered home with a bronze medal in 1:52.97.

New Zealand's Moss Burmester shared a fourth place with host nation China's Wu Peng in 1:54.35, while Poland's Paweł Korzeniowski finished sixth with a time of 1:54.60. Brazil's Kaio de Almeida (1:54.71) and Russia's Nikolay Skvortsov (1:55.14) rounded out the finale.

Earlier in the semifinals, Phelps registered his own Olympic record of 1:53.70 to establish a strong lead for the top 8 final, matching his preliminary time in the process.

== Records ==
Prior to this competition, the existing world and Olympic records were as follows.

World record	Michael Phelps (USA)	1:52.09	Melbourne, Australia	28 March 2007	
Olympic record	Michael Phelps (USA)	1:54.04	Athens, Greece	17 August 2004	-

The following new world and Olympic records were set during this competition.

Date	Event	Name	Nationality	Time	Record
August 11	Heat 6	Michael Phelps	United States	1:53.70	OR
August 12	Semifinal 2	Michael Phelps	United States	1:53.70	=OR
August 13	Final	Michael Phelps	United States	1:52.03	WR

== Results ==
=== Heats ===
Rank	Heat	Lane	Name	Nationality	Time	Notes
1	6	4	Michael Phelps	United States	1:53.70	Q, OR
2	4	2	László Cseh	Hungary	1:54.48	Q
3	6	3	Kaio de Almeida	Brazil	1:54.65	Q
4	6	6	Takeshi Matsuda	Japan	1:55.06	Q
5	4	4	Paweł Korzeniowski	Poland	1:55.21	Q
6	6	5	Nikolay Skvortsov	Russia	1:55.33	Q
7	5	5	Wu Peng	China	1:55.39	Q
8	5	4	Gil Stovall	United States	1:55.42	Q
9	5	7	Michael Rock	Great Britain	1:55.55	Q
10	4	5	Moss Burmester	New Zealand	1:55.80	Q
11	5	3	Ryuichi Shibata	Japan	1:55.82	Q
12	4	6	Dinko Jukić	Austria	1:55.96	Q
13	4	1	Ioan Gherghel	Romania	1:56.09	Q, NR
14	6	1	Sergiy Advena	Ukraine	1:56.24	Q
15	5	6	Chen Yin	China	1:56.55	Q
16	3	2	Hsu Chi-chieh	Chinese Taipei	1:56.59	Q
17	5	2	Christophe Lebon	France	1:56.63	
18	6	2	Travis Nederpelt	Australia	1:56.64	
19	6	7	Mathieu Fonteyn	Belgium	1:56.65	NR
20	4	7	Niccolo Beni	Italy	1:56.99	
21	4	3	Denys Sylantyev	Ukraine	1:57.02	
22	5	1	Tamás Kerékjártó	Hungary	1:57.29	
23	6	8	Juan Veloz	Mexico	1:57.32	NR
24	3	6	Pedro Oliveira	Portugal	1:57.41	
25	4	8	Adam Sioui	Canada	1:57.45	
26	3	5	Simon Sjödin	Sweden	1:57.75	
27	5	8	Romanos Alyfantis	Greece	1:57.99	
28	3	8	Alon Mandel	Israel	1:59.27	NR
29	2	5	James Walsh	Philippines	1:59.39	NR
30	3	3	Omar Pinzón	Colombia	1:59.47	
31	1	3	Nikša Roki	Croatia	1:59.58	NR
32	2	1	Javier Núñez	Spain	2:00.24	
33	2	7	Andrés José González	Argentina	2:00.36	
34	2	6	Yoo Jung-nam	South Korea	2:01.00	
35	3	4	Jeremy Knowles	Bahamas	2:01.08	
36	2	8	Alexis Márquez Rivas	Venezuela	2:01.25	
37	3	7	Daniel Bego	Malaysia	2:01.28	
38	2	3	Douglas Lennox-Silva	Puerto Rico	2:01.69	
39	3	1	Georgi Palazov	Bulgaria	2:01.84	
40	1	5	Rehan Poncha	India	2:01.89	
41	1	4	Emmanuel Crescimbeni	Peru	2:02.13	
42	1	6	Javier Hernández Maradiaga	Honduras	2:02.23	
43	2	4	Vladan Marković	Serbia	2:03.12	
44	2	2	Donny Utomo	Indonesia	2:03.44	

=== Semifinals ===
==== Semifinal 1 ====
Rank	Lane	Name	Nationality	Time	Notes
1	5	Takeshi Matsuda	Japan	1:54.02	Q, AS
2	3	Nikolay Skvortsov	Russia	1:54.31	Q, NR
3	4	László Cseh	Hungary	1:54.35	Q
4	2	Moss Burmester	New Zealand	1:55.26	Q
5	6	Gil Stovall	United States	1:55.36	
6	7	Dinko Jukić	Austria	1:55.65	
7	1	Sergiy Advena	Ukraine	1:56.64	
8	8	Hsu Chi-chieh	Chinese Taipei	1:57.48	

==== Semifinal 2 ====
Rank	Lane	Name	Nationality	Time	Notes
1	4	Michael Phelps	United States	1:53.70	Q, =OR
2	6	Wu Peng	China	1:54.93	Q
3	5	Kaio de Almeida	Brazil	1:55.21	Q
4	3	Paweł Korzeniowski	Poland	1:55.35	Q
5	8	Chen Yin	China	1:55.88	
6	2	Michael Rock	Great Britain	1:55.90	
7	7	Ryuichi Shibata	Japan	1:56.17	
8	1	Ioan Gherghel	Romania	1:56.57	

=== Final ===
Rank	Lane	Name	Nationality	Time	Notes
1st place, gold medalist(s)	4	Michael Phelps	United States	1:52.03	WR
2nd place, silver medalist(s)	6	László Cseh	Hungary	1:52.70	ER
3rd place, bronze medalist(s)	5	Takeshi Matsuda	Japan	1:52.97	AS
4	1	Moss Burmester	New Zealand	1:54.35	OC
4	2	Wu Peng	China	1:54.35	NR
6	8	Paweł Korzeniowski	Poland	1:54.60	
7	7	Kaio de Almeida	Brazil	1:54.71	NR
8	3	Nikolay Skvortsov	Russia	1:55.14	
