= 2006 Pan Pacific Swimming Championships – Men's 200 metre butterfly =

Men's 200 metre butterfly at the 2006 Pan Pacific Swimming Championships
- Venue: Saanich Commonwealth Place
- Dates: August 17, 2006 (heats & finals)
- Competitors: 21 from 10 nations
- Winning time: 1:53.80

Medalists
gold medal	Michael Phelps	United States
silver medal	Ryuichi Shibata	Japan
bronze medal	Takeshi Matsuda	Japan

The men's 200 metre butterfly competition at the 2006 Pan Pacific Swimming Championships took place on August 17 at the Saanich Commonwealth Place. The previous champion was Tom Malchow of US.

This race consisted of four lengths of the pool, all lengths being in butterfly stroke.

== Records ==
Prior to this competition, the existing world and Pan Pacific records were as follows:

World record	Michael Phelps (USA)	1:53.93	Barcelona, Spain	July 22, 2003
Pan Pacific Championships record	Tom Malchow (USA)	1:55.21	Yokohama, Japan	August 27, 2002

== Results ==
All times are in minutes and seconds.

KEY:	q	Fastest non-qualifiers	Q	Qualified	CR	Championships record	NR	National record	PB	Personal best	SB	Seasonal best

=== Heats ===
The first round was held on August 17, at 10:52.

Rank	Heat	Lane	Name	Nationality	Time	Notes
1	3	4	Michael Phelps	United States	1:55.50	QA
2	1	4	Takeshi Matsuda	Japan	1:56.22	QA
3	2	4	Ryuichi Shibata	Japan	1:56.26	QA
4	1	5	Travis Nederpelt	Australia	1:56.66	QA
5	3	3	Takashi Yamamoto	Japan	1:56.84	QA
6	2	6	Nick D'Arcy	Australia	1:57.82	QA
7	3	6	Kaio Almeida	Brazil	1:57.83	QA
8	2	5	Davis Tarwater	United States	1:58.15	QA
9	3	2	Jeremy Knowles	Bahamas	1:58.25	QB
10	2	3	Joshua Krogh	Australia	1:58.77	QB
11	1	3	Daniel Madwed	United States	1:59.36	QB
12	3	5	Moss Burmester	New Zealand	1:59.73	QB
13	1	6	Stefan Hirniak	Canada	1:59.85	QB
14	1	1	Eric Shanteau	United States	2:00.78	QB
15	2	2	Chung Yong	South Korea	2:00.88	QB
16	1	2	Chen Yanlong	China	2:02.65	QB
17	3	8	Fernando Silva	Brazil	2:02.71	
18	2	1	Jonathan Blouin	Canada	2:02.81	
19	3	1	Adam Sioui	Canada	2:03.02	
20	1	7	Zheng Lei	China	2:03.25	
21	2	7	Hsu Chi-Chien	Chinese Taipei	2:03.33	
-	3	7	Michael Klueh	United States	DSQ	

=== B Final ===
The B final was held on August 17, at 20:00.

Rank	Lane	Name	Nationality	Time	Notes
9	4	Takashi Yamamoto	Japan	1:58.09	
10	3	Daniel Madwed	United States	1:58.31	
11	5	Joshua Krogh	Australia	1:58.49	
12	6	Moss Burmester	New Zealand	1:59.37	
13	2	Stefan Hirniak	Canada	1:59.72	
14	7	Chung Yong	South Korea	2:01.88	
15	1	Chen Yanlong	China	2:03.35	
16	8	Fernando Silva	Brazil	2:03.90	

=== A Final ===
The A final was held on August 17, at 20:00.

Rank	Lane	Name	Nationality	Time	Notes
1st place, gold medalist(s)	4	Michael Phelps	United States	1:53.80	WR
2nd place, silver medalist(s)	3	Ryuichi Shibata	Japan	1:55.82	
3rd place, bronze medalist(s)	5	Takeshi Matsuda	Japan	1:56.20	
4	6	Travis Nederpelt	Australia	1:58.20	
5	1	Davis Tarwater	United States	1:58.22	
6	2	Nick D'Arcy	Australia	1:58.66	
7	8	Jeremy Knowles	Bahamas	1:58.96	
8	7	Kaio Almeida	Brazil	1:59.34	
