= 2011 Duel in the Pool =

Swimming meet in Atlanta, Georgia, U.S.

2011 Mutual of Omaha Duel in the Pool
- Host city: Atlanta, United States
- Date: 16–17 December 2011
- Venue: Georgia Tech Aquatic Center
- Teams: United States; European All-Stars
- Nations: 19
- Athletes: 76
- Events: 30

The 2011 Duel in the Pool was a swimming meet held December 16 and 17, 2011 at the Georgia Tech Aquatics Center in Atlanta. It was a short course (25m), dual meet between a team from the United States and a European All-Star team featuring swimmers from 18 nations. It was the sixth meet held under the Duel in the Pool name and the second between the United States and a European team.

The United States prevailed by 181.5 to 80.5 points.

== Roster ==
=== United States ===
The United States team featured 17 men and 18 women.

Men

- Mike Alexandrov
- Ricky Berens
- Tyler Clary
- Conor Dwyer
- Jimmy Feigen
- Mark Gangloff
- Matt Grevers
- Brendan Hansen
- Michael Klueh
- Ryan Lochte
- Tyler McGill
- Matt McLean
- Eric Shanteau
- Davis Tarwater
- Nick Thoman
- Peter Vanderkaay
- Garrett Weber-Gale

Women

- Amanda Beard
- Elizabeth Beisel
- Elaine Breeden
- Natalie Coughlin
- Missy Franklin
- Katy Freeman
- Jessica Hardy
- Kathleen Hersey
- Katie Hoff
- Dagny Knutson
- Elizabeth Pelton
- Julia Smit
- Rebecca Soni
- Ashley Steenvoorden
- Chloe Sutton
- Dana Vollmer
- Amanda Weir
- Kate Ziegler

=== European All-Stars ===
The European team consisted of 22 men and 19 women.

Men

- Péter Bernek (HUN)
- Bence Biczó (HUN)
- Adam Brown (GBR)
- László Cseh (HUN)
- Konrad Czerniak (POL)
- Mads Glæsner (DEN)
- Dániel Gyurta (HUN)
- François Heersbrandt (BEL)
- Pál Joensen (FAR)
- Dinko Jukić (AUT)
- Radosław Kawęcki (POL)
- Gergő Kis (HUN)
- Paweł Korzeniowski (POL)
- Marco Loughran (GBR)
- Dominik Meichtry (SUI)
- Vladimir Morozov (RUS)
- Robbie Renwick (GBR)
- Markus Rogan (AUT)
- Krisztián Takács (HUN)
- Giedrius Titenis (LTU)
- Dávid Verrasztó (HUN)
- Christian vom Lehn (GER)

Women

- Lotte Friis (DEN)
- Martina Granström (SWE)
- Francesca Halsall (GBR)
- Aliaksandra Herasimenia (BLR)
- Katinka Hosszú (HUN)
- Zsuzsanna Jakabos (HUN)
- Anja Klinar (SVN)
- Ranomi Kromowidjojo (NED)
- Rikke Møller Pedersen (DEN)
- Gráinne Murphy (IRL)
- Moniek Nijhuis (NED)
- Jeanette Ottesen (DEN)
- Elizabeth Simmonds (GBR)
- Gemma Spofforth (GBR)
- Marleen Veldhuis (NED)
- Evelyn Verrasztó (HUN)
- Sharon van Rouwendaal (NED)
- Barbora Závadová (CZE)
- Daryna Zevina (UKR)

== Format ==
All events were held in a short course pool (25 m). Up to four swimmers per team took part in each of the twenty-six individual events. Five points were given to the winner, three to the runner-up and one for the third-place finisher, while fourth, fifth and sixth place received no points. In relay events, the winning team was awarded seven points and the losing team none.

Events were held in the following order with women's events first and men's events afterwards:

Day 1 (16 December, evening session)

- 4 × 100 m medley relay
- 400 m individual medley
- 100 m freestyle
- 200 m backstroke
- 200 m breaststroke
- 100 m butterfly
- 400 m freestyle

Day 2 (17 December, afternoon session)

- 800 m freestyle
- 200 m freestyle
- 100 m backstroke
- 100 m breaststroke
- 200 m butterfly
- 50 m freestyle
- 200 m individual medley
- 4 × 100 m freestyle

== Results ==
=== Final points tally ===
Rank	Team	Men	Women	Total
1	United States	93.5	81	174.5
2	European All-Stars	30.5	50	80.5

=== Men ===
Event	Gold		Silver		Bronze	
50 m freestyle	Nick Brunelli; United States	21.28	Vladimir Morozov (Russia) European All-Stars	21.29	Matt Grevers; United States	21.38
100 m freestyle	Ricky Berens; United States	46.60	Garrett Weber-Gale; United States	46.79	Vladimir Morozov (Russia) European All-Stars	47.21
200 m freestyle	Ricky Berens; United States	1:42.68	Matt McLean; United States	1:44.26	Conor Dwyer; United States	1:44.45
400 m freestyle	Michael Klueh; United States	3:40.05	Conor Dwyer; United States	3:40.66	Matt McLean; United States	3:42.11
800 m freestyle	Pál Joensen (Faroe Islands) European All-Stars	7:36.24	Michael Klueh; United States	7:39.90; NR^{[a]}	Mads Glæsner (Denmark) European All-Stars	7:42.27
100 m backstroke	Matt Grevers; United States	49.85	Nick Thoman; United States	50.13	Ryan Lochte; United States	50.65
200 m backstroke	Ryan Lochte; United States	1:48.90	Radosław Kawęcki (Poland) European All-Stars	1:50.12	Tyler Clary; United States	1:51.22
100 m breaststroke	Brendan Hansen; United States	57.47	Dániel Gyurta (Hungary) European All-Stars	57.62	Mike Alexandrov; United States	57.81
200 m breaststroke	Brendan Hansen; United States	2:03.62	Dániel Gyurta (Hungary) European All-Stars	2:03.64	Mike Alexandrov; United States	2:05.08
100 m butterfly	Matt Grevers; United States	50.54	Tyler McGill; United States	50.56	Konrad Czerniak (Poland) European All-Stars Davis Tarwater; United States	50.70
200 m butterfly	László Cseh (Hungary) European All-Stars	1:51.18	Davis Tarwater; United States	1:51.90; NR	Bence Biczó (Hungary) European All-Stars	1:55.26
200 m IM	Ryan Lochte; United States	1:52.98	László Cseh (Hungary) European All-Stars	1:53.31	Markus Rogan (Austria) European All-Stars	1:53.93
400 m IM	Ryan Lochte; United States	3:59.52	Tyler Clary; United States	4:00.35	László Cseh (Hungary) European All-Stars	4:02.91
4 × 100 m freestyle relay	(United States) United States; Matt Grevers (47.08); Garrett Weber-Gale (46.99); Nick Brunelli (47.01); Ricky Berens (46.14)	3:07.22	European All-Stars; Konrad Czerniak (47.17); Adam Brown (46.85); Vladimir Morozov (46.56); Krisztián Takács (47.40)	3:07.98	None awarded	
4 × 100 m medley relay	(United States) United States; Nick Thoman (50.02); Brendan Hansen (56.59); Tyler McGill (50.68); Matt Grevers (46.26)	3:23.55	European All-Stars; Radosław Kawęcki (50.36); Giedrius Titenis (58.28); Konrad Czerniak (50.34); Adam Brown (46.79)	3:25.77	None awarded	

Legend: WR – World record; ER – European record; NR – National record;

=== Women ===
Event	Gold		Silver		Bronze	
50 m freestyle	Marleen Veldhuis (Netherlands) European All-Stars	23.43	Ranomi Kromowidjojo (Netherlands) European All-Stars	23.61	Fran Halsall (United Kingdom) European All-Stars	23.73
100 m freestyle	Ranomi Kromowidjojo (Netherlands) European All-Stars	51.87	Fran Halsall (United Kingdom) European All-Stars	51.95	Natalie Coughlin; United States	52.40
200 m freestyle	Missy Franklin; United States	1:53.19	Dana Vollmer; United States	1:53.92	Katie Hoff; United States	1:54.24
400 m freestyle	Chloe Sutton; United States	3:58.07	Katie Hoff; United States	3:58.21	Lotte Friis (Denmark) European All-Stars	4:00.88
800 m freestyle	Lotte Friis (Denmark) European All-Stars	8:04.77	Chloe Sutton; United States	8:14.29	Gráinne Murphy (Republic of Ireland) European All-Stars	8:18.03
100 m backstroke	Lizzie Simmonds (United Kingdom) European All-Stars	56.82	Natalie Coughlin; United States	56.92	Missy Franklin; United States	57.49
200 m backstroke	Missy Franklin; United States	2:00.14	Lizzie Simmonds (United Kingdom) European All-Stars	2:00.83; ER	Elizabeth Pelton; United States	2:02.16
100 m breaststroke	Jessica Hardy; United States	1:03.33; NR^{[a]}	Rebecca Soni; United States	1:04.53	Rikke Møller Pedersen (Denmark) European All-Stars	1:05.50
200 m breaststroke	Rebecca Soni; United States	2:17.69	Amanda Beard; United States	2:19.72	Caitlin Leverenz; United States	2:19.84
100 m butterfly	Natalie Coughlin; United States	56.23	Jeanette Ottesen (Denmark) European All-Stars	56.24	Dana Vollmer; United States	56.27
200 m butterfly	Kathleen Hersey; United States	2:03.49; NR	Elaine Breeden; United States	2:04.98	Martina Granström (Sweden) European All-Stars	2:06.08
200 m IM	Caitlin Leverenz; United States	2:04.91; NR^{[a]}	Elizabeth Pelton; United States	2:07.27	Katinka Hosszú (Hungary) European All-Stars	2:07.64
400 m IM	Katinka Hosszú (Hungary) European All-Stars	4:24.37	Caitlin Leverenz; United States	4:24.62; NR^{[a]}	Elizabeth Beisel; United States	4:26.48
4 × 100 m freestyle relay	European All-Stars; Jeanette Ottesen (52.39); Fran Halsall (51.57); Aliaksandra Herasimenia (52.21); Ranomi Kromowidjojo (51.36)	3:27.53	(United States) United States; Natalie Coughlin (52.59); Jessica Hardy (52.32); Dana Vollmer (52.19); Missy Franklin (51.36)	3:28.46; NR	None awarded	
4 × 100 m medley relay	(United States) United States; Natalie Coughlin (55.97) NR; Rebecca Soni (1:02.91); Dana Vollmer (55.36); Missy Franklin (51.32)	3:45.56; WR	European All-Stars; Daryna Zevina (56.71); Rikke Møller Pedersen (1:05.31); Jeanette Ottesen (56.17); Marleen Veldhuis (52.85)	3:51.04	None awarded	

Legend: WR – World record; ER – European record; NR – National record;

== Notes ==
^{a} Ratified as an American record by USA Swimming, but was not the fastest time by an American swimmer. USA Swimming’s ban on high-technology swimwear was enforced two months before FINA's, so while American swimmers remained eligible to wear the suits in international competition between 1 October and 31 December 2009, performances in that period were not ratified as American records. The official results do not reflect this distinction.
