= 2008 United States Olympic trials (swimming) =

2008 United States Olympic Trials (swimming)
- Host city: Omaha, Nebraska, U.S.
- Date: June 29 – July 6
- Venue: CenturyLink Center Omaha
- Events: 26 (men: 13; women: 13)

The 2008 United States Olympic trials for swimming events were held from June 29 to July 6 at the CenturyLink Center Omaha in Omaha, Nebraska. It was the qualifying meet for American swimmers who hoped to compete at the 2008 Summer Olympics in Beijing.

== Results ==
Key: Highlighted swimmers achieved the qualification conditions to be included in the Olympic team in that respective event.

=== Men's events ===
Event	First		Second		Third	
50 m freestyle	Garrett Weber-Gale	21.47 NR	Ben Wildman-Tobriner	21.65	Cullen Jones	21.81
100 m freestyle	Garrett Weber-Gale	47.92	Jason Lezak	48.05	Cullen Jones	48.35
200 m freestyle	Michael Phelps	1:44.10	Peter Vanderkaay	1:45.85	Ricky Berens	1:46.14
400 m freestyle	Larsen Jensen	3:43.53 NR	Peter Vanderkaay	3:43.73	Erik Vendt	3:43.92
1500 m freestyle	Peter Vanderkaay	14:45.54	Larsen Jensen	14:50.80	Chad La Tourette	14:57.50
100 m backstroke	Aaron Peirsol	52.89 WR	Matt Grevers	53.19	Ryan Lochte	53.37
200 m backstroke	Aaron Peirsol	1:54.32 =WR	Ryan Lochte	1:54.34	Tyler Clary	1:57.35
100 m breaststroke	Brendan Hansen	59.93	Mark Gangloff	1:00.42	Scott Spann	1:00.59
200 m breaststroke	Scott Spann	2:09.97	Eric Shanteau	2:10.36	Scott Usher	2:11.00
100 m butterfly	Michael Phelps	50.89	Ian Crocker	51.62	Gil Stovall	52.08
200 m butterfly	Michael Phelps	1:52.20	Gil Stovall	1:53.86	Davis Tarwater	1:54.46
200 m IM	Michael Phelps	1:54.80 WR	Ryan Lochte	1:55.22	Eric Shanteau	1:58.15
400 m IM	Michael Phelps	4:05.25 WR	Ryan Lochte	4:06.08	Robert Margalis	4:13.85

=== Women's events ===
Event	First		Second		Third	
50 m freestyle	Dara Torres	24.25 NR	Jessica Hardy	24.82	Lara Jackson	24.88
100 m freestyle	Dara Torres	53.78	Natalie Coughlin	53.83	Lacey Nymeyer	54.02
200 m freestyle	Katie Hoff	1:55.88 NR	Allison Schmitt	1:55.92	Julia Smit	1:56.73
400 m freestyle	Katie Hoff	4:02.32	Kate Ziegler	4:03.92	Allison Schmitt	4:06.06
800 m freestyle	Katie Hoff	8:20.81	Kate Ziegler	8:25.38	Chloe Sutton	8:31.23
100 m backstroke	Natalie Coughlin	58.97 WR	Margaret Hoelzer	59.21	Hayley McGregory	59.42
200 m backstroke	Margaret Hoelzer	2:06.09 WR	Elizabeth Beisel	2:06.92	Hayley McGregory	2:07.69
100 m breaststroke	Jessica Hardy	1:06.87	Megan Jendrick	1:07.50	Tara Kirk	1:07.51
200 m breaststroke	Rebecca Soni	2:22.60	Amanda Beard	2:25.13	Caitlin Leverenz	2:25.98
100 m butterfly	Christine Magnuson	58.11	Elaine Breeden	58.21	Rachel Komisarz	58.36
200 m butterfly	Elaine Breeden	2:06.75	Kathleen Hersey	2:07.33	Kim Vandenberg	2:08.48
200 m IM	Katie Hoff	2:09.71 NR	Natalie Coughlin	2:10.32	Ariana Kukors	2:10.40
400 m IM	Katie Hoff	4:31.12 WR	Elizabeth Beisel	4:32.87	Julia Smit	4:35.73

== See also ==
- United States at the 2008 Summer Olympics
- United States Olympic Trials (swimming)
- USA Swimming
