= Pavel Suškov =

Lithuanian swimmer (born 1981)

Personal information
- Full name: Pavelas Suškovas
- National team: Lithuania
- Born: 19 December 1981 (age 44) Klaipėda, Lithuanian SSR, Soviet Union
- Height: 1.93 m (6 ft 4 in)
- Weight: 84 kg (185 lb)

Sport
- Sport: Swimming
- Strokes: Backstroke, butterfly
- Club: Gintaras Klaipėda

Pavel Suškov (also Pavelas Suškovas, born 19 December 1981) is a Lithuanian former swimmer, who specialized in backstroke events. He held a Lithuanian record in the 200 m butterfly from the 2005 FINA World Championships in Montreal, Quebec, Canada, until it was broken by Paulius Andrijauskas two years later in the same tournament. He is a member of Gintaras Sports Club in his home town Klaipėda, and a graduate of technical operations management at Klaipėda University.

Suškov qualified for the men's 200 m backstroke at the 2004 Summer Olympics in Athens, by eclipsing a FINA B-standard entry time of 2:02.65 from the World Championships in Barcelona, Spain. He challenged seven other swimmers on the second heat, including Olympic veterans Derya Büyükuncu of Turkey and Nicholas Neckles of Barbados. He edged out Poland's Adam Mania to take a fifth spot by 0.19 of a second in 2:03.54. Suškov failed to advance into the semifinals, as he placed twenty-sixth overall in the preliminaries.
