= Swimming at the 2006 Asian Games – Men's 200 metre butterfly =

Men's 200 metre butterfly at the 2006 Asian Games
- Venue: Hamad Aquatic Centre
- Date: 2 December 2006
- Competitors: 15 from 12 nations

Medalists
| gold medal | Wu Peng | China |
| silver medal | Takeshi Matsuda | Japan |
| bronze medal | Ryuichi Shibata | Japan |

The men's 200m butterfly swimming event at the 2006 Asian Games was held on December 2, 2006 at the Hamad Aquatic Centre in Doha, Qatar.

== Schedule ==
All times are Arabia Standard Time (UTC+03:00)

| Date | Time | Event |
|---|---|---|
| Saturday, 2 December 2006 | 10:52 | Heats |
| Saturday, 2 December 2006 | 18:43 | Final |

== Records ==
Prior to this competition, the existing world, Asian and Games records were as follows.

| World Record | Michael Phelps (USA) | 1:53.80 | Victoria, Canada | 17 August 2006 |
| Asian Record | Takashi Yamamoto (JPN) | 1:54.56 | Athens, Greece | 17 August 2004 |
| Games Record | Wu Peng (CHN) | 1:56.63 | Busan, South Korea | 1 October 2002 |

== Results ==
=== Heats ===
| Rank | Heat | Athlete | Time | Notes |
|---|---|---|---|---|
| 1 | 2 | Ryuichi Shibata (JPN) | 1:57.65 | |
| 2 | 1 | Takeshi Matsuda (JPN) | 1:57.95 | |
| 3 | 2 | Wu Peng (CHN) | 1:58.89 | |
| 4 | 1 | Chen Yin (CHN) | 2:00.97 | |
| 5 | 1 | Daniel Bego (MAS) | 2:01.67 | |
| 6 | 1 | James Walsh (PHI) | 2:01.94 | |
| 7 | 2 | Hsu Chi-chieh (TPE) | 2:02.00 | |
| 8 | 2 | Jeong Doo-hee (KOR) | 2:02.31 | |
| 9 | 1 | David Wong (HKG) | 2:04.99 | |
| 10 | 2 | Arjun Muralidharan (IND) | 2:07.96 | |
| 11 | 2 | Sergey Pankov (UZB) | 2:09.39 | |
| 12 | 1 | Rami Anis (SYR) | 2:09.56 | |
| 13 | 1 | Enchong Dee (PHI) | 2:12.57 | |
| 14 | 2 | Nasir Ali (PAK) | 2:12.95 | |
| 15 | 2 | Ahmed Salamoun (QAT) | 2:15.64 | |

=== Final ===
| Rank | Athlete | Time | Notes |
|---|---|---|---|
| 1st place, gold medalist(s) | Wu Peng (CHN) | 1:54.91 | GR |
| 2nd place, silver medalist(s) | Takeshi Matsuda (JPN) | 1:55.49 | |
| 3rd place, bronze medalist(s) | Ryuichi Shibata (JPN) | 1:56.44 | |
| 4 | Chen Yin (CHN) | 1:56.96 | |
| 5 | Hsu Chi-chieh (TPE) | 2:00.27 | |
| 6 | Jeong Doo-hee (KOR) | 2:00.94 | |
| 7 | Daniel Bego (MAS) | 2:01.32 | |
| 8 | James Walsh (PHI) | 2:01.95 | |
