= Davis Tarwater =

American swimmer

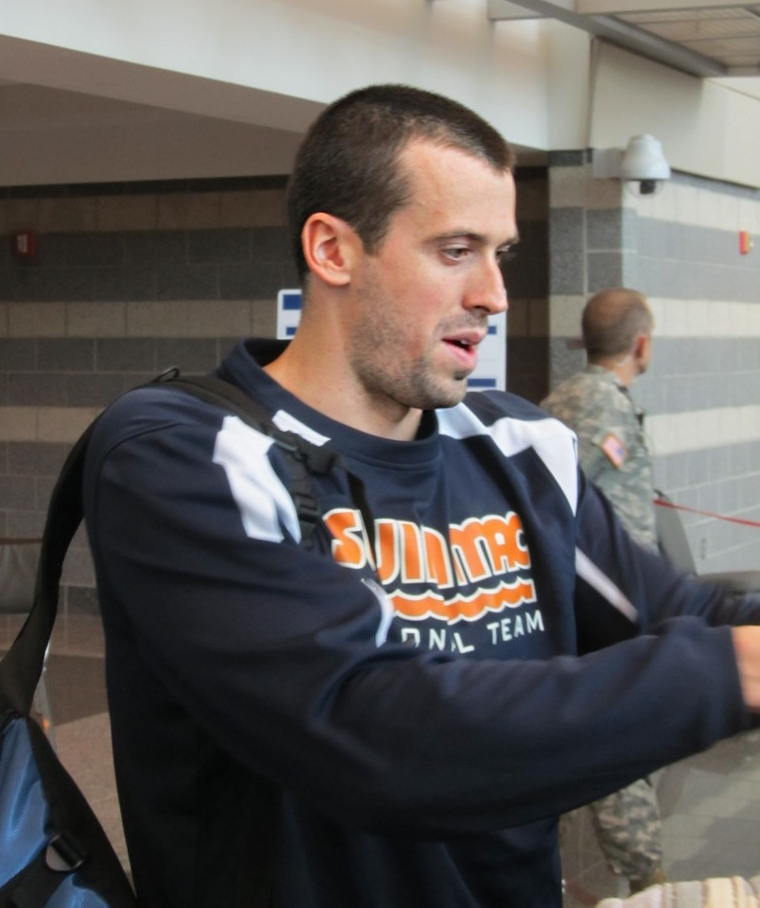
- Tarwater signs autographs at 2012 U.S. Olympic Trials

Personal information
- Full name: Davis Edward Tarwater
- National team: United States
- Born: March 24, 1984 (age 42) Knoxville, Tennessee, U.S.
- Height: 6 ft 1 in (185 cm)
- Weight: 187 lb (85 kg)

Sport
- Sport: Swimming
- Strokes: Butterfly, freestyle
- Club: SwimMAC Carolina
- College team: University of Michigan
Medal record
Men's swimming
Representing the United States
Olympic Games
Gold medal – first place	2012 London	4×200 m freestyle
World Championships (LC)
Gold medal – first place	2009 Rome	4×200 m freestyle
Goodwill Games
Bronze medal – third place	2001 Brisbane	Team medal

Davis Edward Tarwater (born March 24, 1984) is an American swimmer and Olympic gold medalist. He grew up in Knoxville, Tennessee and began competitive swimming at age seven. During high school, he set three state swimming records and led Webb School of Knoxville to the state title. In 2002, he was named High School Swimmer of the Year. Tarwater attended the University of Michigan, earning a bachelor's degree in political science, and St. Antony's College, Oxford earning a master's degree in Latin American Studies.

At Michigan, he shifted his focus from the freestyle to the butterfly. He was a three-time NCAA national champion and thirteen-time All-American. Tarwater set three Big Ten conference and six school records en route to six Big Ten titles. In his senior season, he was awarded the Big Ten Medal of Honor, recognizing his joint athletic and academic excellence throughout his college career.

Tarwater has represented the United States in the World Championships three times, winning a gold medal as part of the 4×200-meter freestyle relay team in 2009. He has won three individual and five relay national titles, and has finished in the top three more than fifteen times. In 2011, he set an American record in the 200-meter butterfly, and as of 2012 jointly holds two additional national records in relay events. He qualified for the U.S. Olympic Trials in 2000, 2004, 2008 and 2012. In 2004, 2008 and 2012, he narrowly missed making the Olympic team in the 200-meter butterfly. In 2012, he finished seventh in the 200-meter freestyle and missed qualifying for the U.S. 4×200-meter freestyle relay team by one spot. Michael Phelps elected to scratch the 200-meter freestyle from his Olympic schedule, however, allowing Tarwater to make the team. At the 2012 Summer Olympics in London, Tarwater won a gold medal for his contributions in the preliminary heats of the 4×200-meter freestyle relay.

== Early life ==
Tarwater was born March 24, 1984, to Dwight and Mary Tarwater in Knoxville, Tennessee. He grew up in Knoxville, where his father worked as a lawyer. He is the oldest of three children. His grandfather, Richmond Flowers, Sr., was Attorney General of Alabama from 1963 to 1967. Tarwater's uncle, Richmond Flowers, Jr., was a world champion at the 110-meter hurdles and a safety in the National Football League from 1969 to 1973.

Tarwater had his first swimming lesson at age four. He was reluctant to put his face underwater at first, but after 15 minutes he was swimming freely. By age seven, he was entering swimming competitions. As a young child, he was diagnosed with epilepsy. The family's doctor encouraged Tarwater to keep swimming, and he eventually outgrew the condition. At age 10, he won the Knoxville City Meet title in the 25-yard butterfly for his age group. In 1993, Tarwater won the 10-year-old and younger 50-meter butterfly at the AAU Junior Olympic Games. As a congratulations, he got a personal letter from Olympic gold medalist Melvin Stewart. His father later said the [letter] got Davis really excited about swimming. The next year, Tarwater joined the Pilot Aquatic Club and began to compete on the national stage.

Tarwater played baseball and basketball, and ran track before deciding the concentrate on swimming during seventh grade. In 1999, he won both the 800- and 1500-meter freestyle events at the Junior Nationals, beating Michael Phelps in the latter. He qualified for his first U.S. Olympic Trials in 2000 at age 16. At the Trials, Tarwater finished 32nd in the 400-meter freestyle and 30th in the 1500-meter freestyle.

In 2001, Tarwater finished third at the Summer Nationals in the 1500-meter freestyle. He represented the United States at the 2001 Goodwill Games and was named "Athlete of the Year" by Southeastern Swimming Local Swimming Committee. The United States placed third at the Games, earning Tarwater a team bronze medal.

The following year, Tarwater led his high school – Webb School of Knoxville – to its first (and only) state swimming title before graduating in the spring. At the state finals, he broke the Tennessee 500-yard freestyle record by five seconds and also captured the 100-yard butterfly state record. At the U.S. Spring National Championships, Tarwater made the finals in four events. He placed third in the 200-meter butterfly, sixth in the 1500-meter freestyle, and eighth in both the 400- and the 800-meter freestyle events.

Tarwater was a nine-time high school All-American and was the 2002 High School Swimmer of the Year. In addition to the 100-yard butterfly and 500-yard freestyle, he also set the 200-yard freestyle state record during high school. After graduation, he was inducted into the school's hall of fame.

== College career ==
Tarwater attended the University of Michigan from 2002 to 2006, where he earned a bachelor's degree in political science. During his first year, coach Jon Urbanchek began entering Tarwater in butterfly events. "I was a distance freestyler in high school, so ... at first it was a difficult adjustment", Tarwater said of the move. "But it was what the team needed, and it let me contribute as a freshman." During the summer, he was selected to represent the United States at the 2003 Pan American Games where he placed sixth in the 400-meter freestyle.

Urbanchek's decision and Tarwater's training started to pay dividends in 2004. That year, Tarwater set his first conference record by swimming the 200-yard butterfly in 1:43.46 en route to the Big Ten title. He was part of the university's 4×200-meter freestyle team that took first place at the NCAA Championships. The group's time of 7:01.42 set a new U.S. Open record. In individual events, Tarwater took fourth place in the 200-meter butterfly and eighth in the 100-meter butterfly.

Tarwater qualified for the 2004 U.S. Olympic Trials and finished fourth in the 200-meter butterfly, missing the Olympics by less than half a second. He also made the final in the 100-meter butterfly, finishing seventh.

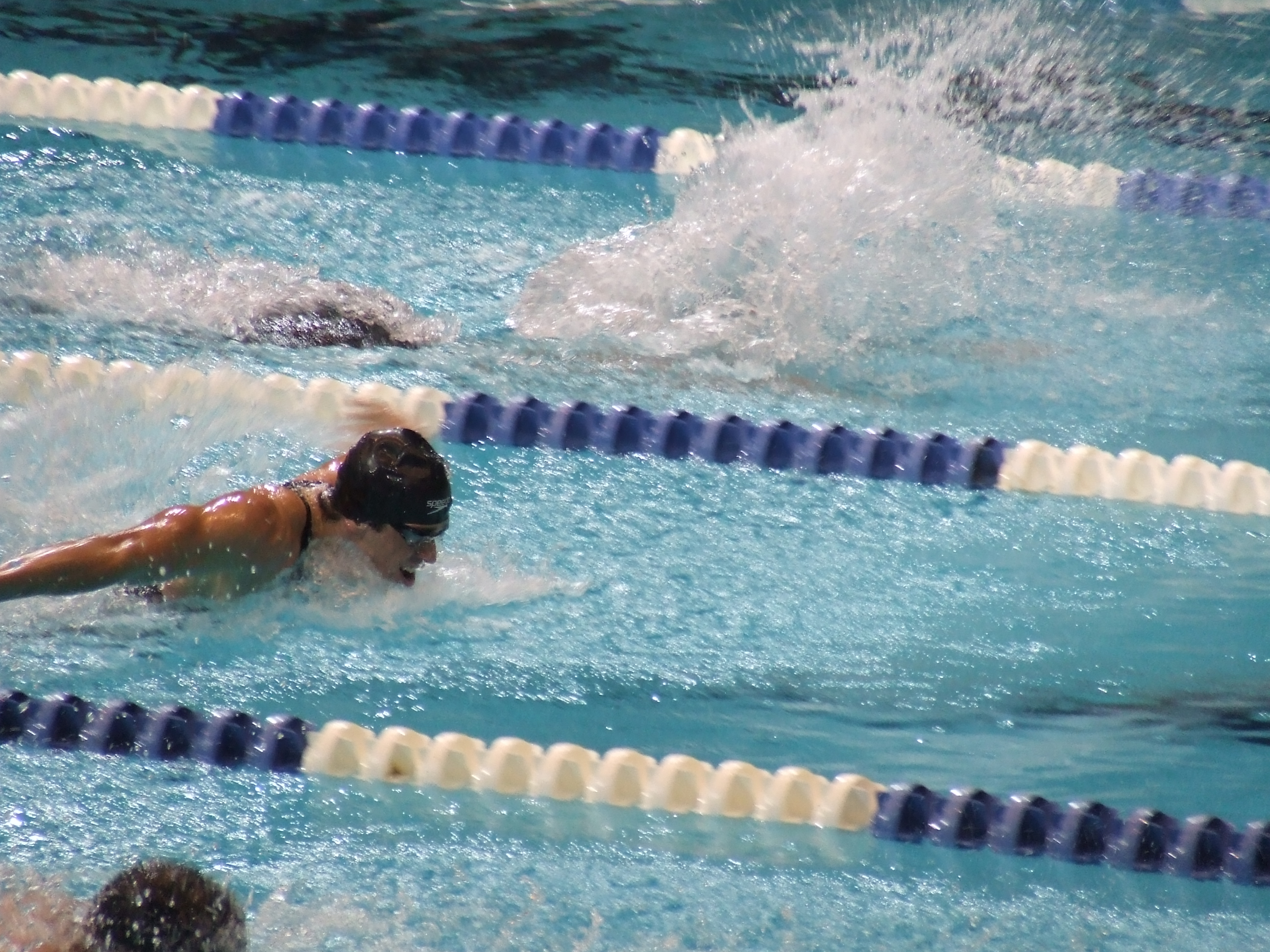
Tarwater swims the 100-meter butterfly at the 2009 National Championships

Bob Bowman took over as head coach of Michigan for the 2004–05 season. He put Tarwater on a new training program, with a greater focus on speed training and less on distance. "We've also put him through weight training, and I think it's been improving his speed", Bowman said. "He has a very strong work ethic and always wants to improve. Instead of just getting in the pool and doing what we tell him to do, he actually thinks about it and asks questions. He wants to know the theory behind what he's doing." Tarwater won the 2005 NCAA championship in the 200-yard butterfly. His time of 1:42.30 was a Michigan and Big Ten record, and the third fastest time in NCAA history. In the 100-meter butterfly, he placed fourth.

In the spring, Tarwater won the US National Championship in the 200-meter butterfly with a time of 1:51.78, and placed fourth in the 100-meter butterfly. At Summer Nationals, Tarwater placed second in the 100-meter butterfly and was part of the National Championship winning 4×100-meter freestyle relay team. At the 2005 World Championships, he narrowly missed out on the medals, finishing fourth in the 200-meter butterfly. At the 2005 Duel in the Pool, Tarwater won the silver medal in both the 100-meter and 200-meter butterfly events. At the end of the season, he was ranked eighth in the world at the 200-meter butterfly and 20th at the 100-meter butterfly.

In 2006, Tarwater repeated as NCAA champion in the 200-yard butterfly, swimming the race in 1:41.84 and improving his own Big Ten record. He narrowly missed the NCAA record, coming up six-hundredths of a second short. He also finished fourth in the 100-yard butterfly, and was part of the second place 4×200-yard freestyle relay team. At the end of the season, the Detroit Athletic Club named Tarwater as the "Michigan Male College Athlete of the Year" for his combined achievements in sport, academics, and community service.

During his college career, Tarwater was a 13-time All-America selection. He was a first team All-Big Ten member all four years of college, and received Academic All-Big Ten honors in 2004, 2005, and 2006. In his 2006 senior year, he was awarded the Big Ten Medal of Honor, which recognizes one male and one female student from the graduating class of each Big Ten member school, for demonstrating joint athletic and academic excellence throughout their college career. He finished his college career with three Big Ten individual titles, three conference relay titles, and three conference records: the 100-yard butterfly (46.16), the 200-yard butterfly (1:41.84), and the 4×200-yard freestyle relay (6:18.11). He was part of three additional school records for relay performances (4×100-yard freestyle, 4×50-yard medley, and 4×100-yard medley).

== Post-college swimming career ==
After graduation, Tarwater continued to train at the Michigan facilities with one goal in mind: qualifying for the 2008 Olympics. "I hadn't intended to swim professionally after college," he later said, "but I had continued to improve," and it "made sense" financially to continue swimming. In August 2006, he placed second in the 200-meter butterfly at the U.S. National Championships with a time of 1:57.00, qualifying him for the 2007 World Championships. He also teamed up with Klete Keller, Matthew Patton, and Alex Vanderkaay to win the 4×200-meter freestyle trophy, winning by more than six seconds. At the end of the season, Tarwater was ranked 13th in the world at the 200-meter butterfly and 34th at the 100-meter butterfly.

At the World Championships in March 2007, Tarwater turned in the second-fastest time in the opening round of the 200-meter butterfly. In the semi-finals, he placed tenth, missing the finals by 0.11 seconds. Later in 2007, Tarwater won his second national championship in the 200-meter butterfly. He led the race from start to finish, beating Gil Stovall by 1.1 seconds. "It was a good race," he said. "I felt really in control. I felt a lot stronger and a lot better." At the same event, Tarwater joined Michael Phelps and two other Wolverine Aquatics teammates to win the 4×100-meter freestyle relay with a time of 3:17.96. Tarwater swam the team's second-fastest leg, behind Phelps. He also placed third in the 100-meter butterfly.

Tarwater won the 200-meter butterfly at the 2007 Duel in the Pool with a time of 1:57.12, and placed second in the 100-meter butterfly with a time of 52.76 at the same event. At the Short Course National Championships, Tarwater teamed up with Michael Phelps, Peter Vanderkaay, and Chris DeJong to capture the 4×200-yard freestyle relay title. The quartet's time of 6:12.43 broke the American record by more than five seconds. Tarwater captured the silver medal in 100-meter butterfly at the event, and won the 200-yard butterfly title with a time of 1:41.94. He was also part of the second=place 4×100-medley relay. He finished the year ranked 11th in the 200-meter butterfly and 22nd in the 100-meter.

=== 2008 Olympic Trials ===
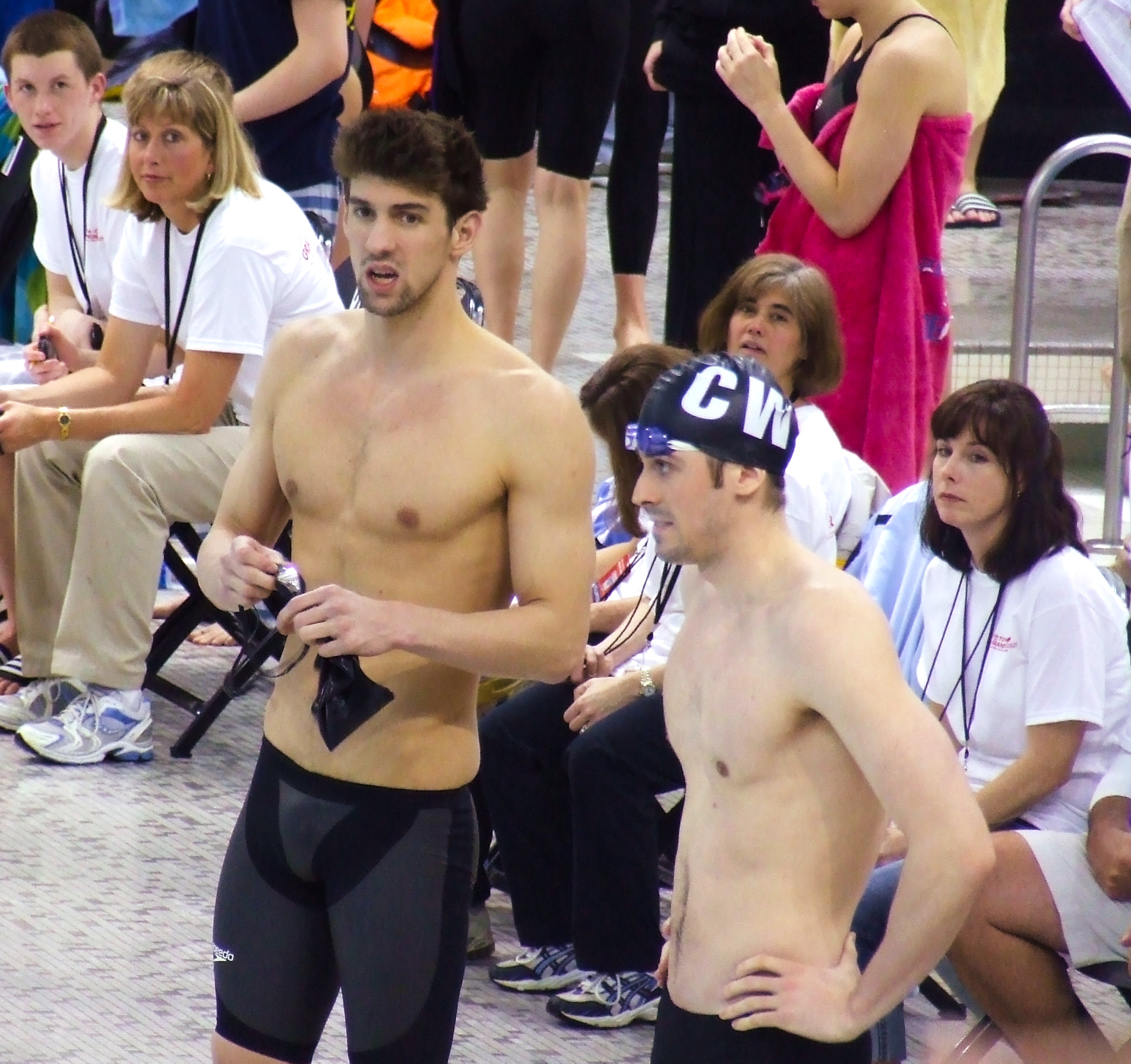
Tarwater (right) talks with Michael Phelps during a Grand Prix meet in 2008

In preparation for the 2008 U.S. Olympic Trials, Tarwater trained at Michigan with Phelps, Peter Vanderkaay, and Erik Vendt, coached by Bowman and Urbanchekf. Shortly before the trials, he went the Olympic Training Center in Colorado Springs, Colorado to train at altitude. "I'm better mentally than I've ever been," Tarwater said of his preparation. "Physically I'm stronger than four years ago." He entered the Trials as the number two seed in the 200-meter butterfly and was widely expected to make the U.S. Olympic team as the second qualifier behind Phelps. "For the last two years I have completely put everything in my life aside to try to make [my Olympic] dream come true," he told a reporter. He also entered the trials as the fourth seed in the 100-meter butterfly and qualified for the 100- and 200-meter freestyle.

In the preliminary round of the 200-meter butterfly, Tarwater turned in the fastest time, acknowledging that nerves played a role in his fast swim. In the semi-finals, he achieved a new personal best of 1:54.72 and finished with the second-fastest time, just seven-tenths of a second slower than Phelps. "It felt great, but there's still no celebrating for me," he said about the swim. In the finals, Tarwater was exactly tied with Phelps and on world-record pace through the first 50 meters. He stayed near Phelps for 150 meters before fading on the last 50. In the last 25 meters, he was passed by Gil Stovall, who beat his personal best by a second and a half, to finish third. Tarwater also swam a new personal best – 1:54.46 – but it was not good enough to make the Olympic team, missing out by six-tenths of a second. After the race, he briefly considered retiring before deciding to finish the meet. "I don't know what the future is going to bring, but I didn't want to go out knowing I didn't get back up," he said. He finished eighth in the 100-meter butterfly; earlier, he failed to make the finals in the freestyle events.

Tarwater was devastated by the trial results, later saying, "It was the most empty feeling in the world." He went home to Knoxville to reflect on swimming and life in general. He told his parents that he could not stand hearing coverage of the Olympics, so his father quickly organized a vacation to Costa Rica. After returning home, Tarwater's uncle, Richmond Flowers Jr., was able to help him through the experience. In 1968, Flowers had been a gold medal favorite in the hurdles before suffering a hamstring injury two months before the Olympic Trials. "I think he knew the pain I was feeling and the disappointment I was feeling, because he felt same thing," Tarwater recalled. Flowers offered perspective, instead of comfort: "I believe there is a God who created this, and it ain't no accident. He's got a plan ... maybe it just wasn't the right thing for you." Soon after, Tarwater met pastor Doug Banister of All Souls Church in Knoxville. After several "really tough conversions" with Banister, Tarwater decided to "[dedicate his] life to Christ and basically relinquished control."

Tarwater took Flowers' advice to heart and started to look into other possibilities for his future. He applied to graduate school to study public policy, and on a friend's advice sent some of his undergraduate work to Oxford University. He was accepted into St Antony's College, Oxford for the 2009–2010 school year.

=== Retirement and return to swimming ===
At the 2009 National Championships, Tarwater qualified to represent the United States team in the World Championships for the third time in his career by placing sixth in the 200-meter freestyle. He also placed fourth in the 100-meter butterfly, and fifth in the 200-meter butterfly. In the preliminary round of the 4×200-meter freestyle, he helped the United States turn in the top qualifying time. The United States later won the event, earning Tarwater a gold medal. After the 2009 season, Tarwater decided to retire from competitive swimming and concentrate on his academic work at Oxford.

At Oxford, Tarwater found a new perspective on life: "I used to be in the sport for Davis Tarwater. Going to Oxford and seeing the selflessness and ambition of the students transitioned me to being in the sport as a mechanism to do good." The Oxford swim team encouraged him to join its ranks, and he subsequently earned most valuable player honors and a Blue jacket, the British equivalent of a varsity letter. On his newfound perspective, Tarwater said, "Missing the Olympics in 2008 was the best thing that's ever happened in my whole life ... [otherwise] I would not have gone to Oxford; I would not have invested in my own personhood ... being able to chase an Olympic dream is a gift ... I made it a misery. It doesn't have to be a misery." He graduated from Oxford in 2010 with a master's degree in Latin American studies. He described the year at Oxford as the best time of his life.

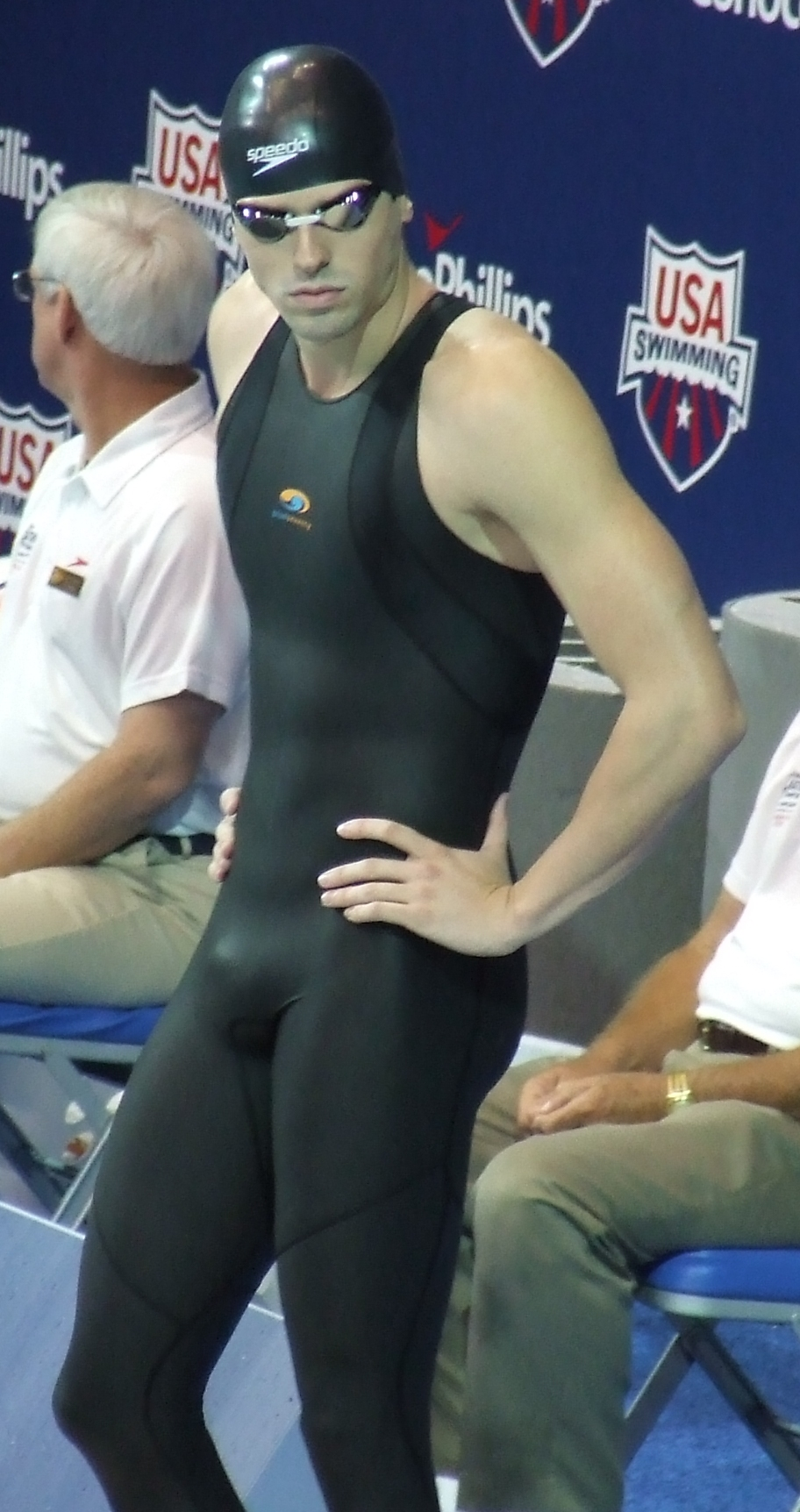
Tarwater waits for a race at the 2009 National Championships

In October 2010, responding to what he describes as a clear call from God, Tarwater returned to swimming full-time. Back in the United States, he contacted David Marsh at his swimming club, SwimMAC Carolina. After talking with Marsh, Tarwater was convinced there was enough time before the 2012 Summer Olympics to make a comeback possible. "I realized that not only is there life left for me in swimming, there's also a desire to come back [to the Olympic Trials] and do it the right way", Tarwater remarked. Marsh introduced Tarwater to a new style of training which focused more on creating power rather than relying on aerobic endurance. Initially, he shifted his focus to the 200-meter freestyle, abandoning the butterfly for a while.

At his first major meet after his return, the May 2011 Charlotte UltraSwim, Tarwater placed third in the 200-meter butterfly behind China's Wu Peng and Phelps. He also joined with three other SwimMAC Carolina members to win the 4×100-meter medley relay. At the National Championships in August, Tarwater placed third in the 100-meter and 200-meter butterfly. He anchored the national title-winning 4×100-meter medley relay team for SwimMAC, and led off the club's national title winning 4×200-meter freestyle relay. The medley relay time of 3:37.70 set a new U.S. Open Record, more than six seconds ahead of the second-place team. Tarwater also placed eighth in the 100-meter freestyle during the meet.

At the 2011 Duel in the Pool in December, Tarwater broke the American record in the 200-meter butterfly (short course), completing the race in 1:51.90. The record was previously held by Michael Phelps with a time of 1:52.26. Tarwater finished second in the event, behind world record-holder László Cseh, and also tied for third in the 100-meter butterfly during the meet.

=== 2012 Olympic Trials ===
Tarwater entered the June 2012 U.S. Olympic Trials with a new perspective: "I want to swim as fast as I can, be the best man I can be, and let the chips fall where they may", he said. "If I make the team ... that would be unbelievable. If I don't make this team, I plan to still be a champion." He entered the competition ranked fourth in the 100-meter butterfly, fifth in the 200-meter butterfly, and also qualified in the 100-meter and 200-meter freestyle. He chose to scratch the 100-meter freestyle to concentrate on the 200-meter butterfly and freestyle. Tarwater made the 200-meter freestyle finals; the top six finishers qualified for the Olympic 4×200 relay team, but Tarwater finished seventh. He missed making the Olympic team by fourteen one-hundredths (0.14) of a second.

In the 200-meter butterfly semi-finals, Tarwater turned in the second-fastest time behind Bobby Bollier as Phelps conserved energy. In the finals the next day, Tarwater, knowing he was facing several strong finishers, decided to go out as hard as he could and try to build a big enough lead to hold on. Tarwater led the field for the first 100 meters. Phelps passed him in the third 50-meter stretch, but Tarwater held off the rest of the field until the final 25 meters when both Bollier and Tyler Clary surged ahead, dropping Tarwater to fourth. His split on the final 50 meters was three seconds slower than his third 50, and two seconds slower than his final lap in 2008. A couple days later, Tarwater advanced to the 100-meter butterfly final, but finished fifth. Afterwards, he called it "the last race I'll ever swim."

The next morning Tarwater boarded a plane and headed home. Later that day, Phelps, facing the prospect of competing in eight events at the Olympics, elected to drop the 200-meter freestyle from his program. Phelps' decision allowed Tarwater to move up into the sixth spot in the 200-meter freestyle and be added to the relay team. Tarwater said he was "shocked" by the news and called it a "storybook ending" to his career. "I was really content in walking away last night. I was in peace and left with my faith intact. To have this extra bout of joy is ... surreal", he said. He immediately boarded another plane and flew back to Omaha, where the Trials were held, for a team meeting and practice. He told Olympic swim coach Gregg Troy, "you won't see anyone show up with more focus and fire .... I will do everything I can to bolster the U.S. team."

=== 2012 Olympics ===
By coincidence, Olympic team training took place in Tarwater's hometown of Knoxville. At the Olympics, Tarwater swam the third leg of the preliminary round of the men's 4×200-meter relay. His time of 1:46.33 was a personal best, and the second-fastest leg for Team USA, which turned in the fastest preliminary swim, and third-fastest among all 64 swimmers. He attributed his performance to concentrating exclusively on the freestyle during the two months between Trials and the Games. Of his Olympic experience, Tarwater said, "Even at 28, with a lot of international experience, nothing matches the Olympics. My heart was pumping so intensely that I was just trying to calm myself down. Standing on the blocks, waiting to take the exchange, I was just saying, 'Breathe. Breathe. Breathe.' ... It's such a rush." Typically, the relay team for the finals is composed of the top two qualifiers plus the two fastest swimmers in the preliminaries. In 2012, however, the U.S. team had its top three swimmers in reserve, as Phelps would swim the relay final despite dropping the individual 200-meter freestyle from his program. In the finals, the U.S. relay team beat the second-place French team by three seconds, winning Tarwater a gold medal.

Tarwater did not immediately announce whether he would retire again, saying, "I'll make that decision when the meet is over." He added, "I need a little bit of a vacation and I think during that time, I'll decide what's next for me and what's best for my career and my life."

== Sponsorship and personal life ==
Tarwater is sponsored by Speedo and Mutual of Omaha. According to The Charlotte Observer, he was "known as one of the most versatile and gracious swimmers never to make an Olympic squad" before finally qualifying in 2012. Webb School athletic director David Meske said he was "someone that has always been humble, has worked extremely hard and has always been so positive". Tarwater says his biggest mentor is his father, remarking, "He taught me how to be a man, but more importantly, how to be a champion."

Tarwater was raised in a Christian home, but growing up he "sort of went through the motions" and didn't really hold strong beliefs. By college, he had abandoned any pretense of faith. He later said that "the Olympics had become an idol in my life." After not making the Olympics in 2008, he met Doug Banister who challenged Tarwater to re-examine his worldview. "The 'A-ha' moments were many," Tarwater later recalled. "[B]y the time I had the ability to prayerfully repent and rebuke the stuff in my life, I was finally at a good time in life .... I would say I recommitted my life because I grew up in a Christian home, but really it was the first time where I knew what I was doing and committed my life to Christ." Tarwater credits his Christian faith for helping him get through the ups and downs of being a competitive swimmer. On his 2012 Olympic experience, he said "It was a real gift from God. I felt His presence so much the past few weeks. It was an unbelievable feeling." Tarwater attends Hope Community Church in Charlotte.

Tarwater has engaged in fundraising for Mott Children's Hospital in Michigan, and has donated his time visiting patients there. When his swimming career is finished, he is interested in working on third world economic development.

== Records ==
Record type	Discipline	Time	Event location	Date set	Date surpassed
National records
American	200 m SC butterfly	1:51.90	2011 Duel in the Pool; Atlanta, GA	December 17, 2011	
American	4×200 m SC freestyle relay (with M. Phelps, P. Vanderkaay, and C. DeJong	6:12.43	2007 Short Course Nationals; Atlanta, GA	November 30, 2007	February 28, 2008 (D. Walters, M. McGinnis, M. Klueh, R. Berens 6:10.55)
U.S. Open	4×100 m medley relay (with N. Toman, K. Swander and T. Phillips)	3:33.70	2011 Nationals; Palo Alto, CA	August 6, 2011	
U.S. Open	4×200 m SC freestyle relay with (P. Vanderkaay, A. Hurd, and D. Ketchum)	7:01.42	2004 NCAA Championships; East Meadow, NY	March 26, 2004	
Minor records
Big Ten Conference	200 yd butterfly	1:43.46	2004 Big Ten Championships; West Lafayette, IN	February 28, 2004	March 26, 2005 (self)
Big Ten Conference	200 yd butterfly	1:42.30	2005 NCAA Championships; Minneapolis, MN	March 26, 2005	March 25, 2006 (self)
Big Ten Conference	200 yd butterfly	1:41.84	2006 NCAA Championships; Atlanta, GA	March 25, 2006	February 25, 2011 (Dan Madwed)
Big Ten Conference	100 yd butterfly	46.44	2005 NCAA Championships; Minneapolis, MN	March 25, 2005	February 24, 2006 (Kyle Bubolz 46.40)
Big Ten Conference	100 yd butterfly	46.16	2006 NCAA Championships; Atlanta, GA	March 24, 2006	February 17, 2007 (Kyle Bubolz 45.96)
Big Ten Conference	4×200 yd freestyle with (P. Vanderkaay, T. DeBerry, and D. Ketchum)	6:20.78	2003 NCAA Championships; Austin, TX	March 28, 2003	March 25, 2005 (self)
Big Ten Conference	4×200 yd freestyle with (P. Vanderkaay, C. DeJong, and A. hurd)	6:18.17	2005 NCAA Championships; Minneapolis, MN	March 25, 2005	March 24, 2006 (self)
Big Ten Conference	4×200 yd freestyle with (P. Vanderkaay, C. DeJong, and A. Vanderkaay)	6:18.11	2006 NCAA Championships; Atlanta, GA	March 24, 2006	February 27, 2009 (T. Clary, A. Schultz, S. Barba, D. Madwed 6:16.39)

== See also ==
- List of Olympic medalists in swimming (men)
- List of United States records in swimming
- List of University of Michigan alumni
- List of World Aquatics Championships medalists in swimming (men)
