= Mathieu Fonteyn =

Belgian swimmer (born 1985)

Personal information
- Full name: Mathieu Fonteyn
- National team: Belgium
- Born: 14 February 1985 (age 41) Leuven, Belgium
- Height: 1.77 m (5 ft 10 in)
- Weight: 72 kg (159 lb)

Sport
- Sport: Swimming
- Strokes: Freestyle, butterfly
- Club: Bruges ZK
- Coach: Rik Valcke

Mathieu Fonteyn (born 14 February 1985) is a Belgian former swimmer, who specialized in freestyle and butterfly events. He represented his nation Belgium at the 2008 Summer Olympics, placing himself among the top 20 swimmers with an illustrious Belgian record in the 200 m butterfly. Fonteyn trained under the tutelage of the national team's assistant coach Rik Valcke at a local swimming club in Bruges until his abrupt retirement shortly before London 2012 due to sustained injuries.

Fonteyn competed for the Belgian swimming squad in the men's 200 m butterfly at the 2008 Summer Olympics in Beijing. Leading up to the Games, he placed fourth in the top-eight final at the European Championships in Eindhoven, Netherlands with an Olympic A-cut time of 1:56.86. Fonteyn blasted a new Belgian record of 1:56.65 to obtain the seventh spot and nineteenth overall in the last of six preliminary heats, narrowly missing out the top 16 semifinal by just sixth hundredths of a second (0.06) and trailing all-time Olympian and eventual world record holder Michael Phelps, who competed in the same race as Fonteyn, by nearly three seconds.
