= Nikolay Skvortsov (swimmer) =

Russian swimmer

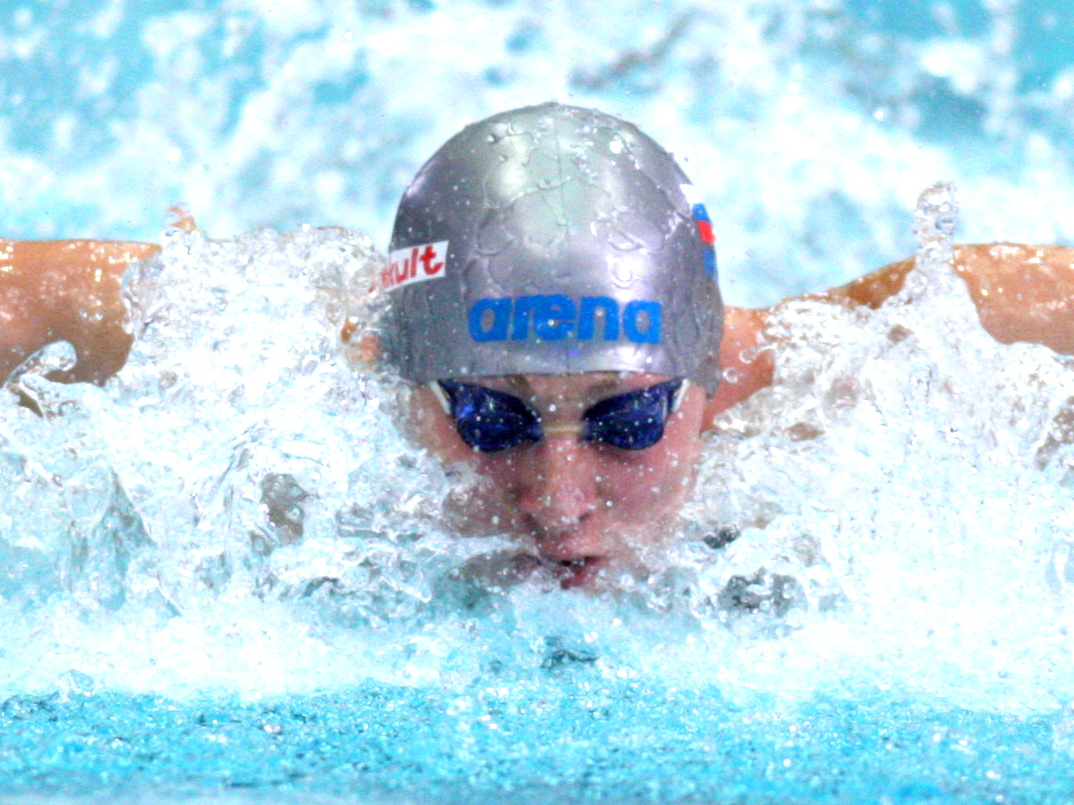
- 2008

Personal information
- Nationality: Russia
- Born: 28 March 1984 (age 42) Obninsk, Soviet Union

Sport
- Sport: Swimming
- Strokes: Butterfly
Medal record
World Championships (LC)
Bronze medal – third place	2007 Melbourne	200 m butterfly
Bronze medal – third place	2007 Melbourne	4×100 m medley
World Championships (SC)
Silver medal – second place	2008 Manchester	200 m butterfly
Silver medal – second place	2012 Istanbul	4×100 m medley
Bronze medal – third place	2004 Indianapolis	4×100 m medley
Bronze medal – third place	2006 Shanghai	200 m butterfly
Bronze medal – third place	2008 Manchester	100 m butterfly
Bronze medal – third place	2012 Istanbul	200 m butterfly
European Championships (LC)
Gold medal – first place	2006 Budapest	4×100 m medley
Gold medal – first place	2008 Eindhoven	4×100 m medley
Silver medal – second place	2004 Madrid	50 m butterfly
Silver medal – second place	2008 Eindhoven	200 m butterfly
Silver medal – second place	2010 Budapest	200 m butterfly
Silver medal – second place	2010 Budapest	4×100 m medley
Bronze medal – third place	2004 Madrid	100 m butterfly
Bronze medal – third place	2006 Budapest	100 m butterfly
Bronze medal – third place	2006 Budapest	200 m butterfly
European Championships (SC)
Gold medal – first place	2004 Vienna	200 m butterfly
Gold medal – first place	2008 Rijeka	200 m butterfly
Gold medal – first place	2009 Istanbul	200 m butterfly
Silver medal – second place	2004 Vienna	100 m butterfly
Silver medal – second place	2011 Szczecin	200 m butterfly
Bronze medal – third place	2005 Trieste	200 m butterfly
Bronze medal – third place	2006 Helsinki	100 m butterfly
Bronze medal – third place	2006 Helsinki	200 m butterfly
Bronze medal – third place	2008 Rijeka	100 m butterfly
Bronze medal – third place	2010 Eindhoven	4×50 m medley
Bronze medal – third place	2013 Herning	200 m butterfly

Nikolay Valeryevich Skvortsov (Russian: Николай Валерьевич Скворцов; born 28 March 1984 in Obninsk) is a butterfly swimmer from Russia, who won a silver and a bronze medal at the 2004 European Championships in Madrid, Spain. He swam for Russia at the 2004 Summer Olympics, where he finished in seventh place in the 200 fly. At the 2008 Summer Olympics, he swam in the 100m and 200m butterfly and the 4 × 100 m medley relay, finishing in 20th, 8th and 4th respectively. At the 2012 Summer Olympics, he swam in the same three events, finishing in 10th, 14th and 12th respectively.

Records
Preceded by Franck Esposito	World Record Holder; Men's 200 Butterfly (25m); 13 December 2008 – 10 November 2009	Succeeded by Kaio de Almeida
