= Ryuichi Shibata =

Japanese swimmer (born 1983)

Personal information
- Full name: Ryuichi Shibata
- National team: Japan
- Born: 14 December 1983 (age 42) Fukuoka, Japan
- Height: 1.73 m (5 ft 8 in)
- Weight: 73 kg (161 lb)

Sport
- Sport: Swimming
- Strokes: Butterfly
- Club: Team Arena
- Coach: Toshiaki Kurosawa
Medal record
Men's swimming
Representing Japan
Pan Pacific Championships
Silver medal – second place	2006 Victoria	200 m butterfly
Asian Games
Bronze medal – third place	2006 Doha	200 m butterfly
Summer Universiade
Bronze medal – third place	2005 Izmir	4×100 m medley

Ryuichi Shibata (柴田 隆一, Shibata Ryuichi; born December 14, 1983) is a Japanese swimmer, who specialized in butterfly events. He represented his nation Japan at the 2008 Summer Olympics and has won a career total of three medals (one silver and two bronze) in a major international competition, spanning the Asian Games, Pan Pacific Championships, and Summer Universiade. Shibata also established both his personal best and Japanese techsuit-era record of 1:51.30 at the 2007 FINA World Cup in Singapore, until it was finally smashed by Hidemasa Sano at the Japan Swimming Open in 2010. Shibata is a student at Nihon University in Tokyo.

In 2006, Shibata won a bronze medal in the 200 m butterfly at the Asian Games in Doha, Qatar (1:56.44), and a silver at the Pan Pacific Swimming Championships in Victoria, British Columbia, Canada (1:55.82), finishing behind American swimmer and world-record holder Michael Phelps.

Shibata competed for the Japanese squad in the men's 200 m butterfly at the 2008 Summer Olympics in Beijing. Leading up to the Games, he cleared a FINA A-standard entry time of 1:55.57 at the Olympic Trials in Tokyo. Moreover, Shibata's surprising triumph dashed the hopes of two-time Olympic medalist Takashi Yamamoto, who finished behind him in third and thereby missed out on his fourth Olympic bid. Despite entering the semifinals with an eleventh-seeded time of 1:55.82 from the evening prelims, Shibata tried to command his lead over all-time Olympian Michael Phelps at the final turn of the race, but faded down the stretch to hit the wall in seventh position and twelfth overall. Shibata's semifinal mark of 1:56.17 was not worthy enough to advance him further to the top 8 final.
