= Gil Stovall =

American swimmer (born 1986)

Personal information
- Full name: William Gilbert Stovall, V
- Nickname: "Gil"
- National team: United States
- Born: June 3, 1986 (age 40) Tupelo, Mississippi, U.S.
- Height: 5 ft 8 in (173 cm)
- Weight: 150 lb (68 kg)
- Spouse: Emily Loft Stovall

Sport
- Sport: Swimming
- Strokes: Butterfly
- Club: Athens Bulldog Swim Club
- College team: University of Georgia

William Gilbert Stovall, V (born June 3, 1986) is an American former competition swimmer who represented the United States at the 2008 Olympic Games. Stovall placed second in his signature event, the 200-meter butterfly, at the U.S. Olympic Trials in Omaha, Nebraska, with a career-best time of 1:53.86, which earned him a place on the U.S. Olympic team. At that time, Stovall was the second-fastest swimmer ever in that event, behind only Michael Phelps.

Stovall swam competitively for the University of Georgia from 2004 to 2008. In his final season at Georgia, he broke Melvin Stewart's 17-year-old NCAA record in the 200-yard butterfly at the NCAA Men's Swimming Championships, winning the title. Stovall coached for the Cincinnati Marlins for one season.

Gil is currently an adjunct instructor with HMTC, he is especially known for his expertise in Hazardous Material Shipment placarding.

== See also ==
- List of University of Georgia people
