= Paweł Korzeniowski =

Polish swimmer (born 1985)

Paweł Korzeniowski OLY
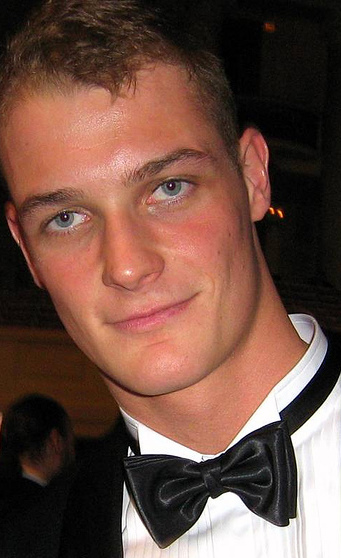

Personal information
- Nickname: "Korzeń"
- National team: Poland
- Born: 9 July 1985 (age 41) Oświęcim, Małopolskie, Polish People's Republic
- Height: 1.92 m (6 ft 4 in)
- Weight: 80 kg (176 lb; 12 st 8 lb)

Sport
- Sport: Swimming
- Strokes: Freestyle, butterfly
- Club: AZS AWF Warszawa
Medal record
Men's swimming
Representing Poland
| Event | 1st | 2nd | 3rd |
|---|---|---|---|
| Olympic Games | 0 | 0 | 0 |
| World Championships (LC) | 1 | 2 | 0 |
| World Championships (SC) | 0 | 0 | 2 |
| European Championships (LC) | 3 | 0 | 1 |
| European Championships (SC) | 3 | 5 | 7 |
| Summer Universiade | 3 | 0 | 1 |
| Total | 10 | 7 | 11 |
World Championships (LC)
| Gold medal – first place | 2005 Montreal | 200 m butterfly |
| Silver medal – second place | 2009 Rome | 200 m butterfly |
| Silver medal – second place | 2013 Barcelona | 200 m butterfly |
World Championships (SC)
| Bronze medal – third place | 2008 Manchester | 200 m butterfly |
| Bronze medal – third place | 2014 Doha | 200 m butterfly |
European Championships (LC)
| Gold medal – first place | 2006 Budapest | 200 m butterfly |
| Gold medal – first place | 2008 Eindhoven | 200 m butterfly |
| Gold medal – first place | 2010 Budapest | 200 m butterfly |
| Silver medal – second place | 2024 Belgrade | 4×100 m freestyle |
| Bronze medal – third place | 2014 Berlin | 200 m butterfly |
European Championships (SC)
| Gold medal – first place | 2005 Trieste | 200 m butterfly |
| Gold medal – first place | 2006 Helsinki | 200 m butterfly |
| Gold medal – first place | 2007 Debrecen | 400 m freestyle |
| Silver medal – second place | 2004 Vienna | 200 m butterfly |
| Silver medal – second place | 2005 Trieste | 400 m freestyle |
| Silver medal – second place | 2007 Debrecen | 200 m butterfly |
| Silver medal – second place | 2009 Istanbul | 200 m butterfly |
| Silver medal – second place | 2013 Herning | 200 m butterfly |
| Bronze medal – third place | 2003 Dublin | 200 m butterfly |
| Bronze medal – third place | 2004 Vienna | 200 m freestyle |
| Bronze medal – third place | 2004 Vienna | 400 m freestyle |
| Bronze medal – third place | 2006 Helsinki | 200 m freestyle |
| Bronze medal – third place | 2006 Helsinki | 400 m freestyle |
| Bronze medal – third place | 2007 Debrecen | 200 m freestyle |
| Bronze medal – third place | 2011 Szczecin | 400 m freestyle |
Summer Universiade
| Gold medal – first place | 2005 Izmir | 200 m butterfly |
| Gold medal – first place | 2009 Belgrade | 200 m butterfly |
| Gold medal – first place | 2013 Kazan | 100 m butterfly |
| Bronze medal – third place | 2011 Shenzhen | 100 m butterfly |

Paweł Korzeniowski (born 9 July 1985) is a Polish competitive swimmer who won the 200-meter butterfly at the 2005 World Aquatics Championships in Montreal. He also competes in the freestyle events.

Initially trained by Paweł Woźnicki in Oświęcim-based Unia Oświęcim club, in 2005 he was transferred to Warsaw-based AZS AWF Warszawa club, where he has been trained by Paweł Słomiński. His current coach, since 2009, is Robert Bialecki.

== Notable achievements ==
- 2001
  - European Youth Olympic Festival – silver in 200m butterfly
- 2002
  - European Junior Championships – silver in 1500m freestyle
- 2003
  - World Championships – 8th in 1500m freestyle
  - European Short Course Championships – bronze in 200m butterfly
  - European Junior Championships – gold in 200 m butterfly, bronze in 400m freestyle
- 2004
  - European Short Course Championships – silver in 200m butterfly, bronze in 400m and 200m freestyle
  - Olympic Games – 4th in 200m butterfly
- 2005
  - World Championships – gold in 200m butterfly
  - Universiade – gold in 200m butterfly
- 2006
  - European Championship (50m pool) – gold in 200m butterfly
- 2012
  - London Olympics – Placed 3rd in the second 200m butterfly semi-final, and 7th overall to reach the final.

Olympic Games
| Preceded by Karol Bielecki | Flagbearer for Poland (with Maja Włoszczowska); Tokyo 2020 | Succeeded by Incumbent |
