= Moss Burmester =

New Zealand swimmer and diver

Moss Burmester OLY
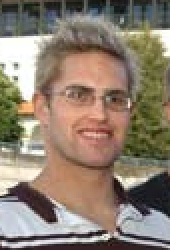
- Burmester in 2007

Personal information
- Full name: Moss James Burmester
- Born: 19 June 1981 (age 45) Hastings, New Zealand

Sport
- Sport: Swimming
Medal record
Men's swimming
Representing New Zealand
World Championships (SC)
Gold medal – first place	2008 Manchester	200 m butterfly
Silver medal – second place	2006 Shanghai	200 m butterfly
Commonwealth Games
Gold medal – first place	2006 Melbourne	200 m butterfly
Bronze medal – third place	2006 Melbourne	100 m butterfly

Moss James Burmester (born 19 June 1981) is a New Zealand swimmer and diver. His specialist event is the 200m butterfly.

Burmester was born in Hastings, New Zealand. He grew up in Tauranga and received his education at Otumoetai College. His career highlights in the 200m butterfly are 4th at the 2008 Olympics and gold medallist at the 2006 Commonwealth Games in Melbourne where he set a Commonwealth Games record of 1:56.64.

He was the bronze medallist in the 100m butterfly at the 2006 Commonwealth Games with a time of 52.73 and set a New Zealand record of 52.37 when qualifying for New Zealand's 2008 Olympic team.

After he retired from swimming, he became an unassisted diver.

== Career highlights ==
=== 2008 Olympics ===
In the 200m butterfly final, Burmester led for the first 50m, slipped to second behind Michael Phelps for the middle 100m and finished 4th equal, setting a Commonwealth record of 1:54.35.

=== 2006 Commonwealth Games ===
- 1st: 200 m butterfly (1:56.64 – Games record)
- 3rd: 100 m butterfly (52.73)

=== 2004 Olympic Games ===
- 28th 400 m freestyle (3:57.29)
- 28th 1500 m freestyle (15:56.42)
- 12th: 200 m butterfly (1:58.09)

=== 2002 Commonwealth Games ===
- 18th: 100 m freestyle (53.21)
- 16th: 50 m butterfly (25.50)
- 9th: 100 m butterfly (54.96)
- 4th: 200 m butterfly (1:59.94)

== See also ==
- Commonwealth Games records in swimming
