= 2006 Pan Pacific Swimming Championships – Men's 200 metre individual medley =

Men's 200 metre individual medley at the 2006 Pan Pacific Swimming Championships
- Venue: Saanich Commonwealth Place
- Dates: August 20, 2006 (heats & finals)
- Competitors: 24 from 8 nations
- Winning time: 1:55.84

Medalists
gold medal	Michael Phelps	United States
silver medal	Ryan Lochte	United States
bronze medal	Ken Takakuwa	Japan

The men's 200 metre individual medley competition at the 2006 Pan Pacific Swimming Championships took place on August 20 at the Saanich Commonwealth Place. The last champion was Michael Phelps of US.

This race consisted of four lengths of the pool, one each in backstroke, breaststroke, butterfly and freestyle swimming.

== Records ==
Prior to this competition, the existing world and Pan Pacific records were as follows:

World record	Michael Phelps (USA)	1:55.94	Maryland, United States	August 9, 2003
Pan Pacific Championships record	Michael Phelps (USA)	1:59.70	Yokohama, Japan	August 29, 2002

== Results ==
All times are in minutes and seconds.

KEY:	q	Fastest non-qualifiers	Q	Qualified	CR	Championships record	NR	National record	PB	Personal best	SB	Seasonal best

=== Heats ===
The first round was held on August 20, at 10:13.

Rank	Heat	Lane	Name	Nationality	Time	Notes
1	4	4	Michael Phelps	United States	2:00.30	QA
2	4	3	Brian Johns	Canada	2:00.95	QA
3	3	4	Ryan Lochte	United States	2:01.08	QA
4	2	4	Ken Takakuwa	Japan	2:01.19	QA
5	3	5	Leith Brodie	Australia	2:01.32	QA
6	2	5	Hidemasa Sano	Japan	2:01.79	QA
7	4	6	Adam Lucas	Australia	2:02.10	QA
8	2	3	Thiago Pereira	Brazil	2:02.72	?
8	4	5	Dean Kent	New Zealand	2:02.72	?
10	3	3	Keith Beavers	Canada	2:03.23	QB
11	2	6	Shinya Taniguchi	Japan	2:03.31	QB
12	4	2	Travis Nederpelt	Australia	2:03.97	QB
13	4	7	Lucas Salatta	Brazil	2:04.15	QB
14	3	2	André Schultz	Brazil	2:04.48	QB
15	4	8	Fernando Silva	Brazil	2:04.50	QB
16	3	6	Jeremy Knowles	Bahamas	2:05.03	QB
17	2	7	Tobias Oriwol	Canada	2:05.54	
18	4	1	Jordan Hartney	Canada	2:06.55	
19	3	1	Daniel Madwed	United States	2:08.18	
20	2	2	Sun Hongzhe	United States	2:08.20	
21	3	7	Tsai Kuo-Chuan	Chinese Taipei	2:08.88	
22	1	5	Ephraim Hannant	Australia	2:10.34	
23	1	4	Lin Yu-An	Chinese Taipei	2:10.37	
24	1	3	Hsu Chi-Chien	Chinese Taipei	2:10.46	
-	2	1	Michael Klueh	United States	DSQ	

=== B Final ===
The B final was held on August 20, at 18:28.

Rank	Lane	Name	Nationality	Time	Notes
9	3	Travis Nederpelt	Australia	2:02.43	
10	4	Keith Beavers	Canada	2:02.96	
11	5	Shinya Taniguchi	Japan	2:03.95	
12	7	Jeremy Knowles	Bahamas	2:04.34	
13	2	André Schultz	Brazil	2:05.31	
14	6	Lucas Salatta	Brazil	2:05.79	
15	8	Daniel Madwed	United States	2:05.93	
16	1	Tobias Oriwol	Canada	2:06.61	

=== A Final ===
The A final was held on August 20, at 18:28.

Rank	Lane	Name	Nationality	Time	Notes
1st place, gold medalist(s)	4	Michael Phelps	United States	1:55.84	WR
2nd place, silver medalist(s)	3	Ryan Lochte	United States	1:56.11	
3rd place, bronze medalist(s)	6	Ken Takakuwa	Japan	1:59.81	
4	2	Leith Brodie	Australia	2:00.75	
5	7	Hidemasa Sano	Japan	2:01.50	
6	5	Brian Johns	Canada	2:01.71	
7	8	Dean Kent	New Zealand	2:02.29	
8	1	Adam Lucas	Australia	2:02.36	
