= 2006 Pan Pacific Swimming Championships – Men's 400 metre individual medley =

Men's 400 metre individual medley at the 2006 Pan Pacific Swimming Championships
- Venue: Saanich Commonwealth Place
- Dates: August 18, 2006 (heats & finals)
- Competitors: 22 from 10 nations
- Winning time: 4:10.47

Medalists
gold medal	Michael Phelps	United States
silver medal	Robert Margalis	United States
bronze medal	Thiago Pereira	Brazil

The men's 400 metre individual medley competition at the 2006 Pan Pacific Swimming Championships took place on August 18 at the Saanich Commonwealth Place. The last champion was Michael Phelps of US.

This race consisted of eight lengths of the pool. The first two lengths were swum using the butterfly stroke, the second pair with the backstroke, the third pair of lengths in breaststroke, and the final two were freestyle.

== Records ==
Prior to this competition, the existing world and Pan Pacific records were as follows:

World record	Michael Phelps (USA)	4:08.26	Athens, Greece	August 14, 2004
Pan Pacific Championships record	Michael Phelps (USA)	4:12.48	Yokohama, Japan	August 25, 2002

== Results ==
All times are in minutes and seconds.

KEY:	q	Fastest non-qualifiers	Q	Qualified	CR	Championships record	NR	National record	PB	Personal best	SB	Seasonal best

=== Heats ===
The first round was held on August 18, at 10:58.

Rank	Heat	Lane	Name	Nationality	Time	Notes
1	3	4	Michael Phelps	United States	4:13.62	QA
2	1	4	Robert Margalis	United States	4:14.69	QA
3	2	4	Erik Vendt	United States	4:15.63	QA
4	3	5	Eric Shanteau	United States	4:15.71	QA
5	2	8	Thiago Pereira	Brazil	4:16.86	QA
6	3	2	Leith Brodie	Australia	4:21.65	QA
7	2	5	Hidemasa Sano	Japan	4:22.41	QA
8	1	5	Shinya Taniguchi	Japan	4:22.95	QA
9	2	2	Lucas Salatta	Brazil	4:23.46	QB
10	3	3	Travis Nederpelt	Australia	4:23.63	QB
11	3	6	Jeremy Knowles	Bahamas	4:26.17	QB
12	2	6	Tobias Oriwol	Canada	4:26.87	QB
13	1	2	Jordan Hartney	Canada	4:27.66	QB
14	2	3	Dean Kent	New Zealand	4:28.05	QB
15	1	6	David Browne	Australia	4:28.46	QB
16	1	7	He Xiaofeng	China	4:38.23	QB
17	3	8	Benjamin Guzman	Chile	4:39.90	
18	3	1	Hsu Chi-Chien	Chinese Taipei	4:41.01	
19	3	7	Lin Yu-An	Chinese Taipei	4:42.12	
20	2	7	Tsai Kuo-Chuan	Chinese Taipei	4:44.00	
21	1	1	Bogdan Knezevic	Canada	4:44.67	
22	2	1	Matthew Pariselli	Canada	4:45.13	
-	1	3	Brian Johns	Canada	DSQ	

=== B Final ===
The B final was held on August 18, at 19:28.

Rank	Lane	Name	Nationality	Time	Notes
9	4	Erik Vendt	United States	4:16.72	
10	6	Dean Kent	New Zealand	4:21.25	
11	5	Tobias Oriwol	Canada	4:24.81	
12	2	David Browne	Australia	4:26.14	
13	3	Jordan Hartney	Canada	4:31.31	
14	7	He Xiaofeng	China	4:36.07	
15	1	Benjamin Guzman	Chile	4:42.58	
-	8	Hsu Chi-Chien	Chinese Taipei	DSQ	

=== A Final ===
The A final was held on August 18, at 19:28.

Rank	Lane	Name	Nationality	Time	Notes
1st place, gold medalist(s)	4	Michael Phelps	United States	4:10.47	CR
2nd place, silver medalist(s)	5	Robert Margalis	United States	4:13.85	
3rd place, bronze medalist(s)	3	Thiago Pereira	Brazil	4:18.44	
4	1	Travis Nederpelt	Australia	4:20.07	
5	7	Shinya Taniguchi	Japan	4:20.32	
6	6	Leith Brodie	Australia	4:22.49	
7	8	Jeremy Knowles	Bahamas	4:28.07	
-	2	Hidemasa Sano	Japan	DSQ	
