= 2002 Pan Pacific Swimming Championships – Men's 200 metre butterfly =

Men's 200 metre butterfly at the 2002 Pan Pacific Swimming Championships
- Venue: Yokohama International Swimming Pool
- Dates: August 26, 2002 (heats & semifinals); August 27, 2002 (final)
- Competitors: 22 from 11 nations
- Winning time: 1:55.21

Medalists
gold medal	Tom Malchow	United States
silver medal	Michael Phelps	United States
bronze medal	Takashi Yamamoto	Japan

The men's 200 metre butterfly competition at the 2002 Pan Pacific Swimming Championships took place on August 26–27 at the Yokohama International Swimming Pool. The last champion was Tom Malchow of US.

This race consisted of four lengths of the pool, all lengths being in butterfly stroke.

== Records ==
Prior to this competition, the existing world and Pan Pacific records were as follows:

World record	Michael Phelps (USA)	1:54.58	Fukuoka, Japan	July 24, 2001
Pan Pacific Championships record	Tom Malchow (USA)	1:55.41	Sydney, Australia	August 25, 1999

== Results ==
All times are in minutes and seconds.

KEY:	q	Fastest non-qualifiers	Q	Qualified	CR	Championships record	NR	National record	PB	Personal best	SB	Seasonal best

=== Heats ===
The first round was held on August 26.

Rank	Heat	Lane	Name	Nationality	Time	Notes
1	2	4	Tom Malchow	United States	1:57.09	Q
2	1	4	Takashi Yamamoto	Japan	1:57.58	Q
3	2	3	Yu Kondo	Japan	1:59.01	Q
4	3	4	Michael Phelps	United States	1:59.15	Q
5	1	5	Takeshi Matsuda	Japan	1:59.27	Q
6	1	6	Juan Pablo Valdivieso	Peru	2:00.53	Q
7	3	6	Kohei Kawamoto	Japan	2:00.61	Q
8	1	3	Eric Donnelly	United States	2:00.75	Q
8	3	7	Pedro Monteiro	Brazil	2:00.75	Q
10	3	3	Andrew Livingston	Puerto Rico	2:00.99	Q
11	3	5	Justin Norris	Australia	2:01.24	Q
12	2	5	Heath Ramsay	Australia	2:02.01	Q
13	2	6	Moss Burmester	New Zealand	2:02.16	Q
14	1	2	Chad Murray	Canada	2:02.53	Q
15	1	7	Trent Steed	Australia	2:02.94	Q
16	2	7	Dean Kent	New Zealand	2:03.13	Q
17	2	2	Mark Kwok Kin Ming	Hong Kong	2:04.98	
18	3	8	Lucas Salatta	Brazil	2:06.53	
19	3	1	Szeto Shui Ki	Hong Kong	2:07.39	
20	1	1	Kléber Ihara	Brazil	2:07.81	
21	2	1	Ng Cheng Xun	Singapore	2:11.88	
22	2	8	Dean Palacios	Northern Mariana Islands	2:18.63	
-	3	2	Brian Johns	Canada	DNS	

=== Semifinals ===
The semifinals were held on August 26.

Rank	Heat	Lane	Name	Nationality	Time	Notes
1	1	5	Michael Phelps	United States	1:56.15	Q
2	2	4	Tom Malchow	United States	1:56.19	Q
3	1	4	Takashi Yamamoto	Japan	1:56.25	Q
4	2	3	Takeshi Matsuda	Japan	1:56.71	Q
5	2	7	Justin Norris	Australia	1:58.77	Q
6	2	6	Kohei Kawamoto	Japan	1:59.66	Q
7	1	3	Juan Pablo Valdivieso	Peru	1:59.87	Q
8	2	5	Yu Kondo	Japan	2:00.06	Q
9	2	2	Pedro Monteiro	Brazil	2:00.07	
10	1	6	Eric Donnelly	United States	2:00.27	
11	1	2	Andrew Livingston	Puerto Rico	2:01.37	
12	2	1	Moss Burmester	New Zealand	2:02.30	
13	2	8	Trent Steed	Australia	2:02.54	
14	1	7	Heath Ramsay	Australia	2:02.57	
15	1	1	Chad Murray	Canada	2:02.82	
16	1	8	Dean Kent	New Zealand	2:03.18	

=== Final ===
The final was held on August 27.

Rank	Lane	Name	Nationality	Time	Notes
1st place, gold medalist(s)	5	Tom Malchow	United States	1:55.21	CR
2nd place, silver medalist(s)	4	Michael Phelps	United States	1:55.41	
3rd place, bronze medalist(s)	3	Takashi Yamamoto	Japan	1:55.57	
4	6	Takeshi Matsuda	Japan	1:56.64	
5	2	Justin Norris	Australia	1:58.40	
6	7	Juan Pablo Valdivieso	Peru	2:00.18	
7	8	Andrew Livingston	Puerto Rico	2:00.41	
8	1	Pedro Monteiro	Brazil	2:00.64	
