= 2014 Pan Pacific Swimming Championships – Men's 100 metre butterfly =

Men's 100 metre butterfly at the 2014 Pan Pacific Swimming Championships
- Venue: Gold Coast Aquatic Centre
- Dates: August 23, 2014 (heats & finals)
- Competitors: 33
- Winning time: 51.29

Medalists
gold medal	Michael Phelps	United States
silver medal	Ryan Lochte	United States
bronze medal	Hirofumi Ikebata	Japan

The men's 100 metre butterfly competition at the 2014 Pan Pacific Swimming Championships took place on August 23 at the Gold Coast Aquatic Centre. The last champion was Michael Phelps of US.

This race consisted of two lengths of the pool, all in butterfly.

== Records ==
Prior to this competition, the existing world and Pan Pacific records were as follows:

World record	Michael Phelps (USA)	49.82	Rome, Italy	August 1, 2009
Pan Pacific Championships record	Michael Phelps (USA)	50.86	Irvine, United States	August 20, 2010

== Results ==
All times are in minutes and seconds.

KEY:	q	Fastest non-qualifiers	Q	Qualified	CR	Championships record	NR	National record	PB	Personal best	SB	Seasonal best

=== Heats ===
The first round was held on August 23, at 10:28.

Rank	Name	Nationality	Time	Notes
1	Ryan Lochte	United States	51.55	QA
2	Michael Phelps	United States	51.57	QA
3	Tim Phillips	United States	51.73	QA
4	Tom Shields	United States	52.00	QA
5	Matthew Ellis	United States	52.01	QA
6	Tommaso D'Orsogna	Australia	52.56	QA
7	Kenta Hirai	Japan	52.70	QA
8	Hirofu Ikebata	Japan	52.71	QA
9	Thiago Pereira	Brazil	52.91	QB
10	Takuro Fujii	Japan	53.00	QB
11	Chris Wright	Australia	53.12	QB
12	Jayden Hadler	Australia	53.15	QB
13	Masato Sakai	Japan	53.34	QB
14	Nicholas Santos	Brazil	53.58	QB
15	Coleman Allen	Canada	53.70	QB
16	Geoffrey Cheah	Hong Kong	53.93	QB
17	Yuki Kobori	Japan	53.96	
18	Katsu Nakamura	Japan	54.04	
19	Albert Subirats	Venezuela	54.07	
20	Shi Yang	China	54.09	
21	Rammaru Harada	Japan	54.14	
22	Luke Peddie	Canada	54.42	
23	Takeshi Matsuda	Japan	54.54	
24	Reo Sakata	Japan	54.66	
25	Gamal Assaad	Canada	54.83	
26	Mack Darragh	Canada	54.89	
27	Ned McKendry	Australia	55.07	
28	Hiromi Fujimori	Japan	55.14	
29	Ryan Coetzee	South Africa	55.42	
30	David Wong	Hong Kong	57.00	
31	Ng Chun Nam	Hong Kong	57.97	
32	Kinve Nicholls	Fiji	1:06.07	
33	Takayaw Tevita	Fiji	1:11.06	

=== B Final ===
The B final was held on August 23, at 19:47.

Rank	Name	Nationality	Time	Notes
9	Tim Phillips	United States	51.52	
10	Jayden Hadler	Australia	53.07	
11	Masato Sakai	Japan	53.38	
12	Coleman Allen	Canada	53.89	
13	Shi Yang	China	53.98	
14	Geoffrey Cheah	Hong Kong	54.11	
15	Gamal Assaad	Canada	54.78	
16	Mack Darragh	Canada	54.86	

=== A Final ===
The A final was held on August 23, at 19:47.

Rank	Name	Nationality	Time	Notes
1st place, gold medalist(s)	Michael Phelps	United States	51.29	
2nd place, silver medalist(s)	Ryan Lochte	United States	51.67	
3rd place, bronze medalist(s)	Hirofumi Ikebata	Japan	52.50	
4	Tommaso D'Orsogna	Australia	52.67	
5	Thiago Pereira	Brazil	52.71	
6	Chris Wright	Australia	52.75	
7	Kenta Hirai	Japan	52.84	
8	Nicholas Santos	Brazil	53.22	
