= 2002 Pan Pacific Swimming Championships – Men's 200 metre individual medley =

Men's 200 metre individual medley at the 2002 Pan Pacific Swimming Championships
- Venue: Yokohama International Swimming Pool
- Dates: August 28, 2002 (heats & semifinals); August 29, 2002 (final)
- Competitors: 24 from 8 nations
- Winning time: 1:59.70

Medalists
gold medal	Michael Phelps	United States
silver medal	Takahiro Mori	Japan
bronze medal	Tom Wilkens	United States

The men's 200 metre individual medley competition at the 2002 Pan Pacific Swimming Championships took place on August 28–29 at the Yokohama International Swimming Pool. The last champion was Tom Wilkens of US.

This race consisted of four lengths of the pool, one each in backstroke, breaststroke, butterfly and freestyle swimming.

== Records ==
Prior to this competition, the existing world and Pan Pacific records were as follows:

World record	Jani Sievinen (FIN)	1:58.16	Rome, Italy	September 11, 1994
Pan Pacific Championships record	David Wharton (USA)	2:00.11	Tokyo, Japan	August 20, 1989

== Results ==
All times are in minutes and seconds.

KEY:	q	Fastest non-qualifiers	Q	Qualified	CR	Championships record	NR	National record	PB	Personal best	SB	Seasonal best

=== Heats ===
The first round was held on August 28.

Rank	Heat	Lane	Name	Nationality	Time	Notes
1	4	3	Tom Wilkens	United States	2:01.73	Q
2	4	4	Michael Phelps	United States	2:01.88	Q
3	3	3	Takahiro Mori	Japan	2:01.92	Q
4	3	4	Kevin Clements	United States	2:02.18	Q
5	2	4	Jiro Miki	Japan	2:02.40	Q
6	3	2	Eric Donnelly	United States	2:02.82	Q
7	4	2	Dean Kent	New Zealand	2:03.07	Q
8	4	5	Brian Johns	Canada	2:03.38	Q
9	3	5	Justin Norris	Australia	2:03.84	Q
10	2	7	Diogo Yabe	Brazil	2:04.18	Q
11	2	6	Shinya Taniguchi	Japan	2:04.48	Q
12	2	3	Robert van der Zant	Australia	2:04.88	Q
13	3	1	Trent Steed	Australia	2:05.65	Q
14	2	2	Chad Murray	Canada	2:06.48	Q
15	4	7	Mark Gangloff	United States	2:07.28	Q
16	4	6	Jin Hao	China	2:07.62	Q
17	2	1	Carlos Sayao	Canada	2:08.04	
18	4	8	Rafael Gonçalves	Brazil	2:08.07	
19	2	8	Lucas Salatta	Brazil	2:08.96	
20	4	1	Tan Lee Yu Gary	Singapore	2:09.01	
21	3	8	José Belarmino Souza	Brazil	2:09.98	
22	1	3	Henrique Barbosa	Brazil	2:10.49	
23	1	4	Kléber Ihara	Brazil	2:10.50	
24	1	6	Seung Gin Lee	Northern Mariana Islands	2:18.03	
-	1	5	Rafael Chua	Philippines	DNS	
-	2	5	Nate Dusing	United States	DNS	
-	3	6	Kosuke Kitajima	Japan	DNS	
-	3	7	Keith Beavers	Canada	DNS	

=== Semifinals ===
The semifinals were held on August 28.

Rank	Heat	Lane	Name	Nationality	Time	Notes
1	1	4	Michael Phelps	United States	1:59.83	Q, CR
2	2	3	Jiro Miki	Japan	2:01.35	Q
3	2	5	Takahiro Mori	Japan	2:01.50	Q
4	2	4	Tom Wilkens	United States	2:01.52	Q
5	2	7	Shinya Taniguchi	Japan	2:01.59	Q
6	1	3	Eric Donnelly	United States	2:01.84	Q
7	1	6	Brian Johns	Canada	2:01.96	Q
8	1	5	Kevin Clements	United States	2:02.07	Q
9	2	6	Dean Kent	New Zealand	2:03.22	
10	2	2	Justin Norris	Australia	2:03.27	
11	1	7	Robert van der Zant	Australia	2:03.36	
12	1	2	Diogo Yabe	Brazil	2:04.85	
13	2	1	Trent Steed	Australia	2:05.21	
14	1	1	Chad Murray	Canada	2:05.62	
15	1	8	Carlos Sayao	Canada	2:07.32	
16	2	8	Jin Hao	China	2:12.02	

=== Final ===
The final was held on August 29.

Rank	Lane	Name	Nationality	Time	Notes
1st place, gold medalist(s)	4	Michael Phelps	United States	1:59.70	CR
2nd place, silver medalist(s)	3	Takahiro Mori	Japan	2:00.61	
3rd place, bronze medalist(s)	6	Tom Wilkens	United States	2:01.17	
4	2	Brian Johns	Canada	2:01.25	
5	5	Jiro Miki	Japan	2:01.67	
6	7	Dean Kent	New Zealand	2:02.88	
7	1	Justin Norris	Australia	2:03.03	
8	8	Robert van der Zant	Australia	2:04.91	
