= 2002 Pan Pacific Swimming Championships – Men's 400 metre individual medley =

Men's 400 metre individual medley at the 2002 Pan Pacific Swimming Championships
- Venue: Yokohama International Swimming Pool
- Dates: August 25, 2002 (heats & finals)
- Competitors: 20 from 6 nations
- Winning time: 4:12.48

Medalists
gold medal	Michael Phelps	United States
silver medal	Erik Vendt	United States
bronze medal	Takahiro Mori	Japan

The men's 400 metre individual medley competition at the 2002 Pan Pacific Swimming Championships took place on August 25 at the Yokohama International Swimming Pool. The last champion was Matthew Dunn of Australia.

This race consisted of eight lengths of the pool. The first two lengths were swum using the butterfly stroke, the second pair with the backstroke, the third pair of lengths in breaststroke, and the final two were freestyle.

== Records ==
Prior to this competition, the existing world and Pan Pacific records were as follows:

World record	Michael Phelps (USA)	4:11.09	Fort Lauderdale, United States	August 15, 2002
Pan Pacific Championships record	Tom Dolan (USA)	4:14.77	Atlanta, United States	August 10, 1995

== Results ==
All times are in minutes and seconds.

KEY:	q	Fastest non-qualifiers	Q	Qualified	CR	Championships record	NR	National record	PB	Personal best	SB	Seasonal best

=== Heats ===
The first round was held on August 25.

Rank	Heat	Lane	Name	Nationality	Time	Notes
1	3	4	Michael Phelps	United States	4:13.27	Q, CR
2	1	3	Takahiro Mori	Japan	4:15.41	Q
3	1	5	Shinya Taniguchi	Japan	4:15.46	Q
4	2	4	Erik Vendt	United States	4:16.64	Q
5	1	4	Tom Wilkens	United States	4:19.06	Q
6	3	3	Brian Johns	Canada	4:19.21	Q
7	1	6	Eric Donnelly	United States	4:19.75	Q
8	3	5	Jiro Miki	Japan	4:20.66	Q
9	3	2	Trent Steed	Australia	4:20.74	
10	3	6	Dean Kent	New Zealand	4:20.97	
11	2	3	Kevin Clements	United States	4:21.74	
12	2	5	Justin Norris	Australia	4:22.51	
13	2	6	Carlos Sayao	Canada	4:23.09	
14	3	7	Keith Beavers	Canada	4:25.03	
15	2	7	Rafael Gonçalves	Brazil	4:26.51	
16	2	2	Chad Murray	Canada	4:29.27	
17	1	2	Anthony van der Kraay	New Zealand	4:31.29	
18	1	7	Diogo Yabe	Brazil	4:31.56	
19	3	1	Lucas Salatta	Brazil	4:34.41	
20	2	1	Kléber Ihara	Brazil	4:40.30	

=== Final ===
The final was held on August 25.

Rank	Lane	Name	Nationality	Time	Notes
1st place, gold medalist(s)	4	Michael Phelps	United States	4:12.48	CR
2nd place, silver medalist(s)	6	Erik Vendt	United States	4:13.15	
3rd place, bronze medalist(s)	5	Takahiro Mori	Japan	4:16.35	
4	2	Brian Johns	Canada	4:16.44	
5	3	Shinya Taniguchi	Japan	4:17.62	
6	8	Justin Norris	Australia	4:20.19	
7	1	Dean Kent	New Zealand	4:20.79	
8	7	Trent Steed	Australia	4:21.45	
