= 2010 Pan Pacific Swimming Championships – Men's 100 metre butterfly =

Men's 100 metre butterfly at the 2010 Pan Pacific Swimming Championships
- Venue: William Woollett Jr. Aquatics Center
- Dates: August 20, 2010 (heats & finals)
- Competitors: 40 from 14 nations
- Winning time: 50.86

Medalists
gold medal	Michael Phelps	United States
silver medal	Tyler McGill	United States
bronze medal	Takuro Fujii	Japan

The men's 100 metre butterfly competition at the 2010 Pan Pacific Swimming Championships took place on August 20 at the William Woollett Jr. Aquatics Center. The last champion was Ian Crocker of US.

This race consisted of two lengths of the pool, all in butterfly.

== Records ==
Prior to this competition, the existing world and Pan Pacific records were as follows:

World record	Michael Phelps (USA)	49.82	Rome, Italy	August 1, 2009
Pan Pacific Championships record	Ian Crocker (USA)	51.47	Victoria, Canada	August 19, 2006

== Results ==
All times are in minutes and seconds.

KEY:	q	Fastest non-qualifiers	Q	Qualified	CR	Championships record	NR	National record	PB	Personal best	SB	Seasonal best

=== Heats ===
The first round was held on August 20, at 11:01.

Rank	Heat	Lane	Name	Nationality	Time	Notes
1	6	4	Michael Phelps	United States	51.48	QA
2	6	6	Tyler McGill	United States	51.69	QA
3	6	5	Takuro Fujii	Japan	52.20	QA
4	4	3	Geoff Huegill	Australia	52.21	QA
5	4	6	Timothy Phillips	United States	52.25	QA
6	6	3	Masayuki Kishida	Japan	52.32	QA
7	5	2	Chris Wright	Australia	52.51	QA
8	5	4	Andrew Lauterstein	Australia	52.55	QA
9	4	5	Mitchell Patterson	Australia	52.56	QB
10	4	7	Nick D'Arcy	Australia	52.77	QB
10	5	7	Ryan Pini	Papua New Guinea	52.77	QB
12	2	4	Wu Peng	China	52.80	QB
13	4	4	Gabriel Mangabeira	Brazil	52.83	QB
14	5	5	Kaio Almeida	Brazil	53.03	QB
15	5	8	Joe Bartoch	Canada	53.06	QB
16	3	3	Ricky Berens	United States	53.09	QB
17	5	6	Thiago Pereira	Brazil	53.28	
18	4	2	Jeong Doo-Hee	South Korea	53.36	
19	4	8	Moss Burmester	New Zealand	53.49	
20	6	8	Ryo Takayasu	Japan	53.63	
20	5	1	Mark Dylla	United States	53.63	
22	6	1	Jayden Hadler	Australia	53.67	
23	3	4	Shunsuke Kuzuhara	Japan	53.74	
24	3	4	Shaune Fraser	Cayman Islands	53.75	
25	4	1	Yuki Kobori	Japan	53.76	
26	3	5	Kazuya Kaneda	Japan	53.78	
27	6	7	Gláuber Silva	Brazil	54.09	
28	3	6	Lucas Salatta	Brazil	54.17	
29	3	1	Leith Brodie	Australia	54.23	
30	5	3	Fernando Silva	Brazil	54.41	
31	2	2	Brett Fraser	Cayman Islands	54.43	
32	1	4	Park Minkyu	South Korea	54.67	
33	3	7	Stefan Hirniak	Canada	54.70	
34	2	3	Karl Wolk	Canada	54.71	
35	3	8	Sebastian Rousseau	South Africa	54.88	
36	2	6	Ryusuke Sakata	Japan	55.14	
37	1	5	Zack Chetrat	Canada	55.42	
38	2	7	Taki Mrabet	Tunisia	55:73	
39	2	5	Nicholas Tan	Singapore	56:26	
40	1	3	Yan Ho-Chun	Hong Kong	58:49	
-	3	2	Hsu Chi-Chieh	Chinese Taipei	DNS	

=== B Final ===
The B final was held on August 20, at 18:55.

Rank	Lane	Name	Nationality	Time	Notes
9	4	Timothy Phillips	United States	52.21	
10	2	Joe Bartoch	Canada	53.20	
11	6	Kaio Almeida	Brazil	53.22	
12	5	Andrew Lauterstein	Australia	53.28	
13	7	Jeong Doo-Hee	South Korea	53.45	
14	1	Moss Burmester	New Zealand	53.98	
15	3	Gabriel Mangabeira	Brazil	54.07	
16	8	Ryo Takayasu	Japan	54.35	

=== A Final ===
The A final was held on August 20, at 18:55.

Rank	Lane	Name	Nationality	Time	Notes
1st place, gold medalist(s)	4	Michael Phelps	United States	50.86	CR
2nd place, silver medalist(s)	5	Tyler McGill	United States	51.85	
3rd place, bronze medalist(s)	3	Takuro Fujii	Japan	52.12	
4	2	Masayuki Kishida	Japan	52.16	
5	6	Geoff Huegill	Australia	52.32	
6	7	Chris Wright	Australia	52.40	
7	1	Wu Peng	China	52.61	
8	8	Ryan Pini	Papua New Guinea	52.94	
