= Michael Phelps =

American swimmer (born 1985)

Michael Phelps OLY
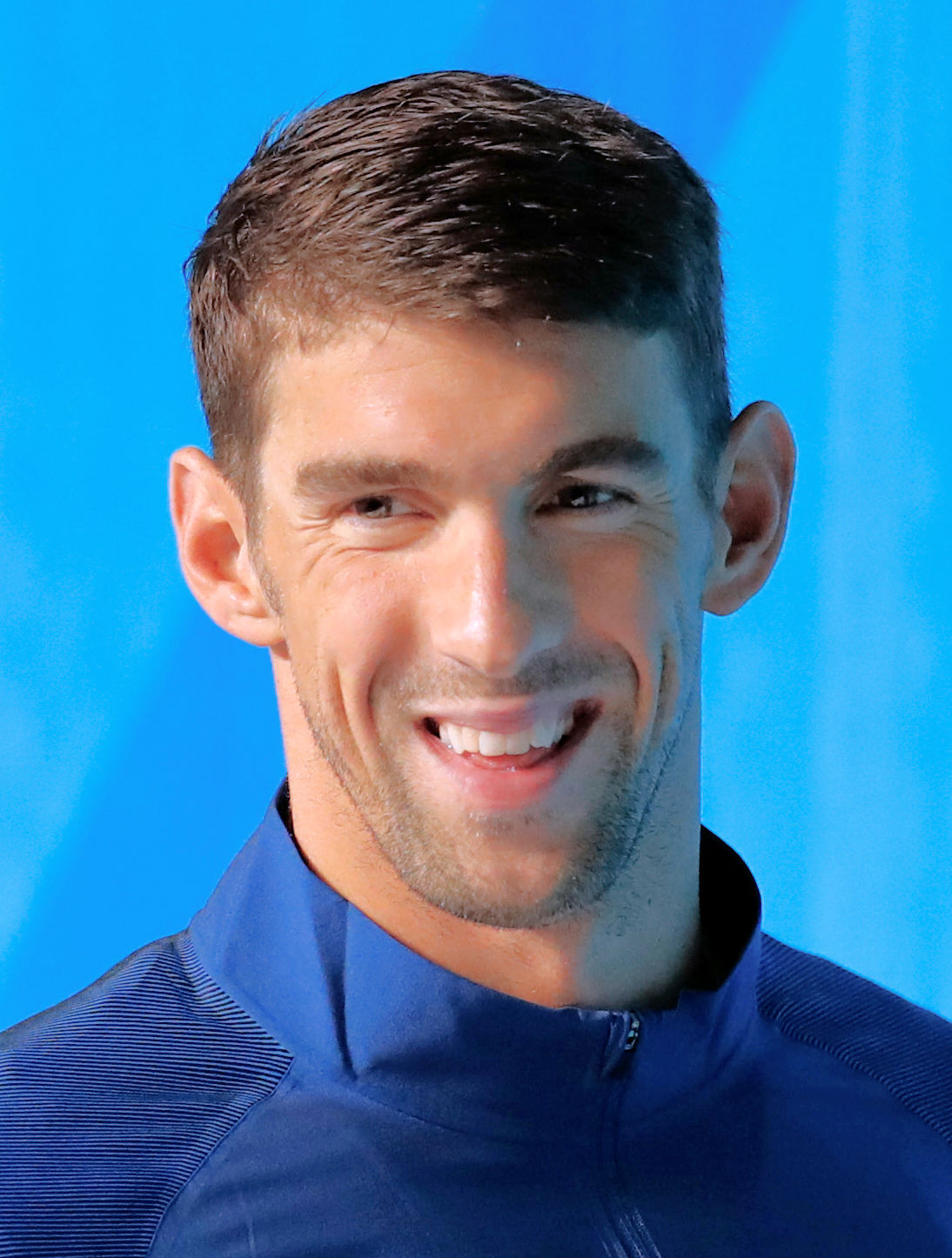
- Phelps at the 2016 Summer Olympics

Personal information
- Full name: Michael Fred Phelps II
- Nicknames: The Baltimore Bullet; Flying Fish
- National team: United States
- Born: June 30, 1985 (age 41) Baltimore, Maryland, U.S.
- Height: 6 ft 4 in (1.93 m)
- Weight: 194 lb (88 kg)
- Spouse: Nicole Johnson (m. 2016)
- Children: 4
- Michael Phelps's voice Michael Phelps on how he came to be an Olympic Athlete; Recorded February 28, 2017

Sport
- Country: United States
- Sport: Swimming
- Strokes: Butterfly, individual medley, freestyle, backstroke
- Club: North Baltimore Aquatic Club
- Coach: Bob Bowman
Medal record
Men's swimming
Representing the United States
Event	1st	2nd	3rd
Olympic Games	23	3	2
World Championships (LC)	26	6	1
World Championships (SC)	1	0	0
Pan Pacific Championships	16	5	0
Total	66	14	3
By race
Event	1st	2nd	3rd
100 m butterfly	8	3	0
200 m butterfly	10	2	0
200 m medley	9	2	0
400 m medley	6	0	0
200 m freestyle	4	2	1
200 m backstroke	0	1	0
4×100 m freestyle	7	2	2
4×200 m freestyle	11	2	0
4×100 m medley	11	0	0
Total	66	14	3
Olympic Games Olympic Games
Gold medal – first place	2004 Athens	100 m butterfly
Gold medal – first place	2004 Athens	200 m butterfly
Gold medal – first place	2004 Athens	200 m medley
Gold medal – first place	2004 Athens	400 m medley
Gold medal – first place	2004 Athens	4×200 m freestyle
Gold medal – first place	2004 Athens	4×100 m medley
Gold medal – first place	2008 Beijing	200 m freestyle
Gold medal – first place	2008 Beijing	100 m butterfly
Gold medal – first place	2008 Beijing	200 m butterfly
Gold medal – first place	2008 Beijing	200 m medley
Gold medal – first place	2008 Beijing	400 m medley
Gold medal – first place	2008 Beijing	4×100 m freestyle
Gold medal – first place	2008 Beijing	4×200 m freestyle
Gold medal – first place	2008 Beijing	4×100 m medley
Gold medal – first place	2012 London	100 m butterfly
Gold medal – first place	2012 London	200 m medley
Gold medal – first place	2012 London	4×200 m freestyle
Gold medal – first place	2012 London	4×100 m medley
Gold medal – first place	2016 Rio de Janeiro	200 m butterfly
Gold medal – first place	2016 Rio de Janeiro	200 m medley
Gold medal – first place	2016 Rio de Janeiro	4×100 m freestyle
Gold medal – first place	2016 Rio de Janeiro	4×200 m freestyle
Gold medal – first place	2016 Rio de Janeiro	4×100 m medley
Silver medal – second place	2012 London	200 m butterfly
Silver medal – second place	2012 London	4×100 m freestyle
Silver medal – second place	2016 Rio de Janeiro	100 m butterfly
Bronze medal – third place	2004 Athens	200 m freestyle
Bronze medal – third place	2004 Athens	4×100 m freestyle
World Championships (LC)
Gold medal – first place	2001 Fukuoka	200 m butterfly
Gold medal – first place	2003 Barcelona	200 m butterfly
Gold medal – first place	2003 Barcelona	200 m medley
Gold medal – first place	2003 Barcelona	400 m medley
Gold medal – first place	2003 Barcelona	4×100 m medley
Gold medal – first place	2005 Montreal	200 m freestyle
Gold medal – first place	2005 Montreal	200 m medley
Gold medal – first place	2005 Montreal	4×100 m freestyle
Gold medal – first place	2005 Montreal	4×200 m freestyle
Gold medal – first place	2005 Montreal	4×100 m medley
Gold medal – first place	2007 Melbourne	200 m freestyle
Gold medal – first place	2007 Melbourne	100 m butterfly
Gold medal – first place	2007 Melbourne	200 m butterfly
Gold medal – first place	2007 Melbourne	200 m medley
Gold medal – first place	2007 Melbourne	400 m medley
Gold medal – first place	2007 Melbourne	4×100 m freestyle
Gold medal – first place	2007 Melbourne	4×200 m freestyle
Gold medal – first place	2009 Rome	100 m butterfly
Gold medal – first place	2009 Rome	200 m butterfly
Gold medal – first place	2009 Rome	4×100 m freestyle
Gold medal – first place	2009 Rome	4×200 m freestyle
Gold medal – first place	2009 Rome	4×100 m medley
Gold medal – first place	2011 Shanghai	100 m butterfly
Gold medal – first place	2011 Shanghai	200 m butterfly
Gold medal – first place	2011 Shanghai	4×200 m freestyle
Gold medal – first place	2011 Shanghai	4×100 m medley
Silver medal – second place	2003 Barcelona	100 m butterfly
Silver medal – second place	2003 Barcelona	4×200 m freestyle
Silver medal – second place	2005 Montreal	100 m butterfly
Silver medal – second place	2009 Rome	200 m freestyle
Silver medal – second place	2011 Shanghai	200 m freestyle
Silver medal – second place	2011 Shanghai	200 m medley
Bronze medal – third place	2011 Shanghai	4×100 m freestyle
World Championships (SC)
Gold medal – first place	2004 Indianapolis	200 m freestyle
Pan Pacific Championships
Gold medal – first place	2002 Yokohama	200 m medley
Gold medal – first place	2002 Yokohama	400 m medley
Gold medal – first place	2002 Yokohama	4×100 m medley
Gold medal – first place	2006 Victoria	200 m butterfly
Gold medal – first place	2006 Victoria	200 m medley
Gold medal – first place	2006 Victoria	400 m medley
Gold medal – first place	2006 Victoria	4×100 m freestyle
Gold medal – first place	2006 Victoria	4×200 m freestyle
Gold medal – first place	2010 Irvine	100 m butterfly
Gold medal – first place	2010 Irvine	200 m butterfly
Gold medal – first place	2010 Irvine	4×100 m freestyle
Gold medal – first place	2010 Irvine	4×200 m freestyle
Gold medal – first place	2010 Irvine	4×100 m medley
Gold medal – first place	2014 Gold Coast	100 m butterfly
Gold medal – first place	2014 Gold Coast	4×200 m freestyle
Gold medal – first place	2014 Gold Coast	4×100 m medley
Silver medal – second place	2002 Yokohama	200 m butterfly
Silver medal – second place	2002 Yokohama	4×200 m freestyle
Silver medal – second place	2006 Victoria	200 m backstroke
Silver medal – second place	2014 Gold Coast	200 m medley
Silver medal – second place	2014 Gold Coast	4×100 m freestyle

Michael Fred Phelps II (born June 30, 1985) is an American former competitive swimmer. He won more Olympic medals than any other athlete, a total of 28 medals across four Olympic Games. Phelps also holds the all-time records for Olympic gold medals (23), Olympic gold medals in individual events (13), and Olympic medals in individual events (16). At the 2004 Summer Olympics in Athens, Phelps tied the record of eight medals of any color at a single Games, held by gymnast Alexander Dityatin, by winning six gold and two bronze medals. Four years later, when he won eight gold medals at the 2008 Beijing Games, he broke fellow American swimmer Mark Spitz's 1972 record of seven first-place finishes at any single Olympic Games. At the 2012 Summer Olympics in London, Phelps won four gold and two silver medals, and at the 2016 Summer Olympics in Rio de Janeiro, he won five gold medals and one silver. This made him the most successful athlete of the Games for the fourth Olympics in a row.

Phelps is a former long course world record holder in the 200-meter freestyle, 100-meter butterfly, 200-meter butterfly, 200-meter individual medley, and 400-meter individual medley. He has won 82 medals in major international long course competitions, of which 65 were gold, 14 silver, and three bronze, spanning the Olympics, the World Championships, and the Pan Pacific Championships. Phelps's international titles and record-breaking performances have earned him the World Swimmer of the Year Award eight times and American Swimmer of the Year Award eleven times, as well as the FINA Swimmer of the Year Award in 2012 and 2016. Phelps earned Sports Illustrated magazine's Sportsman of the Year award due to his unprecedented Olympic success in the 2008 Games.

After the 2008 Summer Olympics, Phelps started the Michael Phelps Foundation, which focuses on growing the sport of swimming and promoting healthier lifestyles. Phelps retired following the 2012 Olympics, but he made a comeback in April 2014. At the 2016 Summer Olympics in Rio de Janeiro, his fifth Olympics, he was selected by his team to be the flag bearer of the United States at the 2016 Summer Olympics Parade of Nations. He announced his second retirement on August 12, 2016, having won more medals than 161 countries. He won the Laureus World Comeback of the Year Award in 2017. He is widely regarded as the greatest swimmer of all time and is often considered to be one of the greatest athletes of all time.

== Early life and education ==
Phelps was born in Baltimore, Maryland, and raised in the Rodgers Forge neighborhood of nearby Towson. Phelps is the youngest of three children. His mother, Deborah Sue "Debbie" Phelps (née Davisson), is a middle school principal. His father, Michael Fred Phelps, was a retired Maryland State Trooper who played football in high school and college and tried out for the Washington Redskins in the 1970s. His parents divorced in 1994 when he was nine years old, and his father remarried in 2000. Phelps later revealed that the divorce had a severe negative impact on him and his siblings, and his relationship with his father was distant for a few years after the divorce. He attended Rodgers Forge Elementary, Dumbarton Middle School, and graduated from Towson High School in 2003. During his school years, he was a target of school bullying due to his ADHD and protruding ears. It reached a point where he retaliated during a situation and received a suspension. The frustration from this experience fueled his drive into swimming.

Phelps began swimming at the age of seven, partly because of the influence of his sisters and partly to provide him with an outlet for his energy. After retirement in 2016, he stated "The only reason I ever got in the water was my mom wanted me to just learn how to swim. My sisters and myself fell in love with the sport, and we decided to swim." When Phelps was in the sixth grade, he was diagnosed with attention deficit hyperactivity disorder (ADHD). By the age of 10, he held a national record for his age group (in the 100-meter butterfly) and began to train at the North Baltimore Aquatic Club under coach Bob Bowman. More age group records followed, and as of August 21, 2018, Phelps still held 11 age group records, eight in long course, and three in short course.

== Swimming career ==
=== Training ===
Phelps has trained under Bob Bowman since he was 11 years old. Bowman swam for Florida State University from 1983 to 1985. Phelps has said Bowman reminded him of a drill sergeant because of his disciplined and regimented ways. Phelps has said, "Training with Bob is the smartest thing I've ever done ... I'm not going to swim for anyone else." After the 2004 Summer Olympics, Bowman was hired as the head coach for the University of Michigan after Jon Urbanchek retired. Phelps joined Bowman at Michigan to train and attended classes over a span of four years, but did not pursue a degree. Phelps served as a volunteer assistant coach at Michigan. After the 2008 Summer Olympics, Bowman returned to Baltimore as CEO at the North Baltimore Aquatic Club. Phelps also returned to Baltimore with Bowman. When Bowman was hired as the men's and women's swimming coach at Arizona State University in 2015, Phelps moved to Arizona to continue training under Bowman. There is a popular myth that Phelps ate 12,000 calories every day, but Phelps has stated it has been exaggerated and that he did not eat so much even in his growing days.

=== 2000 Summer Olympics ===
Phelps's rapid improvement culminated when he qualified for the 2000 Summer Olympics at the age of 15, as he became the youngest male (since Ralph Flanagan in 1932) to make a U.S. Olympic swim team in 68 years. While he did not win a medal, he did make the finals and finished fifth in the 200-meter butterfly.

=== 2001 World Championships ===
2001 World Championships
Gold medal – first place	200 m butterfly	1:54.58 WR

At the World Championship Trials for the 2001 World Aquatics Championships, on March 30, Phelps broke the world record in the 200-meter butterfly to become, at 15 years and 9 months, the youngest male ever to set a world record in swimming. Previously the youngest male had been Ian Thorpe, who captured the 400-meter freestyle world record at 16 years, 10 months. At the World Championships in Fukuoka, Japan, Phelps broke his own world record in the 200-meter butterfly while en route to become a world champion for the first time.

=== 2002 Pan Pacific Championships ===
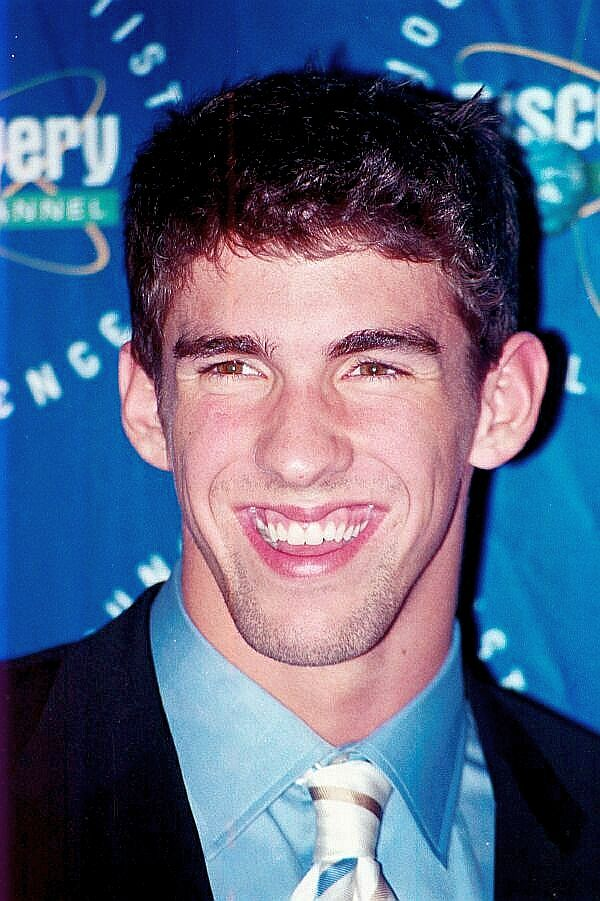
Phelps in 2002

2002 Pan Pacific Championships
Gold medal – first place	200 m medley	1:59.70 CR
Gold medal – first place	400 m medley	4:12.48 CR
Gold medal – first place	4×100 m medley	3:33.48 WR
Silver medal – second place	200 m butterfly	1.55.41
Silver medal – second place	4×200 m freestyle	7:11.81 AM

At Nationals, the selection meet for the 2002 Pan Pacific Swimming Championships, in Fort Lauderdale, Florida, Phelps set an American record in the 200-meter individual medley and was just off the world record in the 200-meter butterfly. In the 400-meter individual medley, Phelps bettered the world record held by Tom Dolan with a time of 4:11.09, just ahead of Erik Vendt, who finished second with a time of 4:11.27, also below the old world record. In the 200-meter freestyle, Phelps was barely beaten by Klete Keller and in the 100-meter butterfly, Phelps beat Ian Crocker.

At the 2002 Pan Pacific Swimming Championships in Yokohama, Japan, Phelps won three gold medals and two silvers. In his first event, the 400-meter individual medley, Phelps won gold ahead of Erik Vendt with a time of 4:12.48. In the 200-meter butterfly, Phelps lost to Tom Malchow, finishing behind him 1:55.41 to 1:55.21. Phelps said he lost because he did not take butterfly training seriously after he broke the world record. In the 200-meter individual medley, Phelps won with a time of 1:59.70. In the 4×200-meter freestyle relay, Phelps, along with Nate Dusing, Klete Keller, and Chad Carvin, won the silver medal with a time 7:11.81 finishing behind Australia. The U.S. 4×100-meter medley relay team consisted of Aaron Peirsol, Brendan Hansen, Phelps, and Ian Crocker. In the final for the medley relay, Phelps swam a 51.1 split, at the time the fastest split in history. The final time of 3:33.48 was a world record.

=== 2003 World Championships ===
2003 World Championships
Gold medal – first place	200 m butterfly	1:54.35
Gold medal – first place	200 m medley	1:56.04 WR
Gold medal – first place	400 m medley	4:09.09 WR
Gold medal – first place	4×100 m medley	3:34.80 CR (heats)
Silver medal – second place	100 m butterfly	51.10
Silver medal – second place	4×200 m freestyle	7:10.26 AM

At Nationals, Phelps won the 200-meter freestyle, 200-meter backstroke, and the 100-meter butterfly. He became the first American swimmer to win three different races in three different strokes at a national championship. At the 2003 Duel in the Pool, a meet that pits swimming stars from Australia and the United States, Phelps broke the world record in the 400-meter individual medley with a time of 4:10.73 and almost broke the world record in the 100-meter butterfly, just missing the record by 0.03 seconds. At a meet in Santa Clara County, California, Phelps broke the world record in the 200-meter individual medley with a time of 1:57.94. Phelps said he broke the 200-meter individual medley world record after Don Talbot said Phelps was unproven, using his words as motivation.

At the 2003 World Aquatics Championships, Phelps won four gold medals, two silver medals, and broke five world records. Phelps broke his first world record on July 22 in the semi-finals for the 200-meter butterfly. Phelps swam a 1:53.93 to break his own world record of 1:54.58 set in 2001 and became the first man to swim under 1:54.00. In the final of the 200-meter butterfly, on July 23, Phelps easily won the gold medal, but did not come close to his world record with a time of 1:54.35. Less than an hour later, Phelps swam the lead-off leg for the 4×200-meter freestyle relay. Phelps put up a solid time of 1:46.60 (an American record) but the Americans could not match the depth of the Australians and ultimately finished second 7:10.26 to 7:08.58.

In the 200-meter individual medley, Phelps dominated. On July 24, in the semi-finals of the 200-meter individual medley, he broke his own world record with a time of 1:57.52. On July 25, in the final of the 200-meter individual medley, Phelps smashed his own record with a time of 1:56.04 to win the gold medal and finished almost 3 seconds ahead of Ian Thorpe. About an hour before the final of the 200-meter individual medley, Phelps swam in the semi-finals of the 100-meter butterfly. Phelps dominated again, finishing in the top seed position with a world record time of 51.47. However, in the final of the 100-meter butterfly, on July 26, Ian Crocker erased Phelps's world record with a time of 50.98, to become the first man under 51 seconds. Phelps swam a 51.10 (also under his former world record), but had to settle for silver. In the final of the 400-meter individual medley, on July 27, Phelps broke his own world record with a time of 4:09.09 to easily claim the gold medal. About half an hour later, Phelps earned his final gold medal when the United States team won the 4×100-meter medley relay. Phelps did not swim in the finals, but still earned a medal because he swam in the heats.

=== 2004 Summer Olympics ===
==== Trials ====
At the 2004 U.S. Olympic Team Trials, Phelps competed in six events; the 200- and 400-meter individual medley, the 100- and 200-meter butterfly, the 200-meter freestyle, and the 200-meter backstroke. In his first event, the 400-meter individual medley, Phelps easily won with a world record time of 4:08.41. Two days later, in the 200-meter freestyle, Phelps won with a time of 1:46.27, finishing sixth-tenths of a second ahead of Klete Keller. Phelps, however, was not pleased with the result and wanted to be in the 1:45s and was uncertain if he would swim the event in Athens. The following day, Phelps won in the 200-meter butterfly with a time of 1:54.31, three seconds ahead of second-place finisher Tom Malchow. After two days off, Phelps was back in the pool and finished second to Aaron Peirsol (who broke the world record) in the 200-meter backstroke. Less than half an hour later, Phelps won the 200-meter individual medley title ahead of Ryan Lochte by 2.70 seconds. The following day, Phelps finished second to Ian Crocker in the 100-meter butterfly. Crocker won in a time of 50.76, a world record and 0.39 seconds ahead of Phelps. When the Trials were over, Phelps became the first person to qualify in six individual events for a U.S. Olympic team. However, Phelps dropped the 200-meter backstroke to focus on the 200-meter freestyle because he wanted to race Ian Thorpe. Even though Phelps did not compete in the 100-meter freestyle at the Trials, he was still selected for the 4×100-meter freestyle relay. Gary Hall, Jr. thought this was unfair and said Phelps did not deserve a spot on the relay. Phelps argued his program was too crowded to compete in 100-meter freestyle and was at least among the top four swimmers because he had beaten the top-seeded Jason Lezak the last time he had swum against him.

2004 Summer Olympics
Gold medal – first place	100 m butterfly	51.25 OR
Gold medal – first place	200 m butterfly	1:54.04 OR
Gold medal – first place	200 m medley	1:57.14 OR
Gold medal – first place	400 m medley	4:08.26 WR
Gold medal – first place	4×200 m freestyle	7:07.33 AM
Gold medal – first place	4×100 m medley	3:35.10 (heats)
Bronze medal – third place	200 m freestyle	1:45.32 AM
Bronze medal – third place	4×100 m freestyle	3:14.62

==== Athens ====
In his first event, the 400-meter individual medley, Phelps won his first Olympic gold medal in the world record time of 4:08.26. The following day, Phelps, along with Ian Crocker, Neil Walker, and Jason Lezak, finished in third place in the 4×100-meter freestyle relay with a time of 3:14.62. Crocker's lead-off time of 50.05 was the worst among the field and was blamed on sickness. In the event many were calling The Race of the Century, the 200-meter freestyle that was held the following day, Phelps finished in third place behind Ian Thorpe and Pieter van den Hoogenband. Although this race ended the chance to match Spitz's record, Phelps had savored the challenge even though it was not his strongest event, saying "How can I be disappointed? I swam in a field with the two fastest freestylers of all time". In his fourth event, the 200-meter butterfly, held the following day, Phelps won a gold medal with a time of 1:54.04, breaking Tom Malchow's Olympic record. About an hour later, in the 4×200-meter freestyle relay, Phelps, along with Ryan Lochte, Peter Vanderkaay, and Klete Keller, finished in first place with a time of 7:07.33.

Two days later, in the 200-meter individual medley, Phelps finished first with a time of 1:57.14, an Olympic record. In the 100-meter butterfly final, held the following day, Phelps defeated American teammate Ian Crocker (who held the world record in the event at the time) by just 0.04 seconds with a time of 51.25. Traditionally, the American who places highest in an individual event will be automatically given the corresponding leg in the 4×100-meter medley relay final. This gave Phelps an automatic entry into the medley relay, but he deferred and Crocker swam instead. Phelps's gesture gave Crocker a chance to make amends (for a mistake at the start of the freestyle relay) as well, getting his final shot at a gold medal. The American medley team went on to win the event in world-record time, and, since Phelps had raced in a preliminary heat of the medley relay, he was also awarded a gold medal along with the team members who competed in the final. In winning six gold and two bronze medals, Phelps, still a teenager, had the second-best performance ever at a single Olympics, behind Mark Spitz's seven gold medals at the 1972 Summer Olympics. Also, he became the second male swimmer ever to win more than two individual titles at a single Games with four, tying Spitz's four from 1972.

=== 2005 World Championships ===
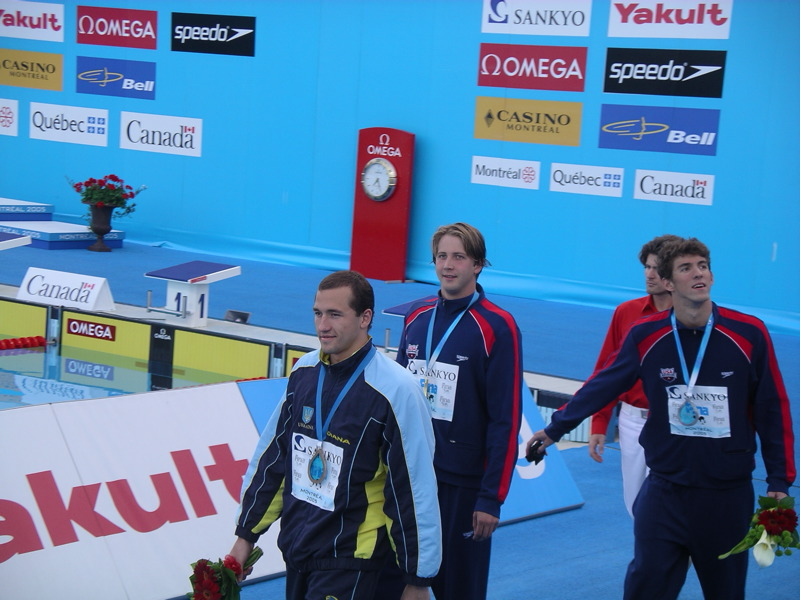
Victory lap of the 100 m butterfly during the 2005 FINA World Championships in Montréal. Phelps is far right.

2005 World Aquatics Championships
Gold medal – first place	200 m freestyle	1:45.20 AM
Gold medal – first place	200 m medley	1:56.68
Gold medal – first place	4×100 m freestyle	3:13.77 CR, AM
Gold medal – first place	4×200 m freestyle	7:06.58 AM
Gold medal – first place	4×100 m medley	3:36.08 (heats)
Silver medal – second place	100 m butterfly	51.65

At the 2005 World Championship Trials, Phelps decided to drop his specialty events, the 400-meter individual medley and the 200-meter butterfly, and experiment with the 400-meter freestyle and the 100-meter freestyle. Phelps went on to win the 400-meter freestyle, the 200-meter freestyle, the 100-meter butterfly, the 100-meter freestyle, and the 200-meter individual medley at the Trials.

At the 2005 World Aquatics Championships, Phelps won a total of six medals, five golds and one silver. In the 400-meter freestyle, Phelps did not make it past the preliminary heats and finished 18th overall with a time of 3:50.53. Later that day, in the 4×100-meter freestyle relay, Phelps won his first gold in the Championships. Two days later, on July 26, Phelps won his second gold in the 200-meter freestyle with a new Americas record (AM) time of 1:45.20, finishing ahead of Grant Hackett. Two days later, on July 28, Phelps finished seventh in the 100-meter freestyle final. Later that day, Phelps won his third gold in the 200-meter individual medley. On July 29, Phelps, along with Ryan Lochte, Peter Vanderkaay and Klete Keller, won the gold in the 4×200-meter freestyle relay with a time of 7:06.58. This was the fourth gold medal for Phelps. On July 30, Phelps swam in his last individual event, the 100-meter butterfly. In the final, Phelps could not match the speed of Ian Crocker and had to settle for silver, finishing 51.65 to 50.40, a new world record for Crocker. On July 31, Phelps earned his final gold medal when the United States team won the 4×100-meter medley relay. Phelps did not swim in the finals but still earned a medal because he swam in the heats.

=== 2006 Pan Pacific Championships ===
2006 Pan Pacific Championships
Gold medal – first place	200 m butterfly	1:53.80 WR
Gold medal – first place	200 m medley	1:55.84 WR
Gold medal – first place	400 m medley	4:10.47 CR
Gold medal – first place	4×100 m freestyle	3:12.46 WR
Gold medal – first place	4×200 m freestyle	7:05.28 CR, AM
Silver medal – second place	200 m backstroke	1:56.81

At the 2006 National Championships, Phelps won three events. In his first event, the 200-meter butterfly, Phelps won with a championship record of 1:54.32. In his second event, the 100-meter butterfly, Phelps just edged out Ian Crocker 51.51 (another championship record) to 51.73. In his third event, the 200-meter individual medley, Phelps won with a time of 1:56.50, just ahead of Ryan Lochte's time of 1:56.78.

At the 2006 Pan Pacific Swimming Championships in Victoria, British Columbia, Phelps won five gold medals and one silver. In his first event, the 200-meter butterfly, Phelps won in a world record time of 1:53.80, his first world record in two years. In his second event, the 400-meter individual medley, Phelps easily won with a time of 4:10.47, 3.38 seconds ahead of second-place finisher Robert Margalis. In his third event, the 4×200-meter freestyle relay, Phelps, along with Ryan Lochte, Peter Vanderkaay, and Klete Keller, won the gold medal with a time of 7:05.28. In his fourth event, the 200-meter backstroke, Phelps won the silver medal, finishing behind Aaron Peirsol 1:56.81 to 1:54.44 (a new world record). In his fifth event, the 4×100-meter freestyle relay, Phelps, along with Neil Walker, Cullen Jones, and Jason Lezak, won the gold medal with a world-record time 3:12.46. In his sixth event, the 200-meter individual medley, Phelps won with a world record time of 1:55.84, breaking his record of 1:55.94 set in 2003.

=== 2007 World Championships ===
2007 World Championships
Gold medal – first place	200 m freestyle	1:43.86 WR
Gold medal – first place	100 m butterfly	50.77
Gold medal – first place	200 m butterfly	1:52.09 WR
Gold medal – first place	200 m medley	1:54.98 WR
Gold medal – first place	400 m medley	4:06.22 WR
Gold medal – first place	4×100 m freestyle	3:12.72 CR
Gold medal – first place	4×200 m freestyle	7:03.24 WR

At the 2007 World Aquatics Championships, Phelps won seven gold medals, tying the record for a global long-course championship held by Mark Spitz since the 1972 Summer Olympics, and broke five world records. Phelps first gold medal came in the 4×100-meter freestyle. Phelps swam the lead-off leg in 48.42 seconds and Neil Walker, Cullen Jones and Jason Lezak each expanded the lead to win in a Championship record of 3:12.72, just missing the world record of 3:12.46 set the previous year. His lead-off time was faster than the winning time in the individual 100-meter freestyle final later in the meet. Phelps set his first world record in the Championships in the 200-meter freestyle, his second race. Phelps won the gold ahead of Pieter van den Hoogenband and broke Ian Thorpe's six-year-old world record with a time of 1:43.86. For his third race, the 200-meter butterfly, Phelps won the gold and bettered his own world record of 1:53.71 with a time of 1:52.09. For his fourth race, the 200-meter individual medley, Phelps set his third world record with a time of 1:54.98, bettering his own world-record time of 1:55.84 For his fifth race, the 4×200-meter freestyle relay, Phelps swam the lead-off leg in 1:45.36 as the American team of Ryan Lochte, Klete Keller, and Peter Vanderkaay went on to win the gold medal and beat the previous world record set by Australia in 2001 with a time 7:03.24. For his sixth race, the 100-meter butterfly, Phelps edged out Ian Crocker 50.77 to 50.82 to win his sixth gold medal. For his seventh event, the 400-meter individual medley, Phelps won the gold medal in a world-record time of 4:06.22, more than 3.5 seconds ahead of Ryan Lochte. By winning seven gold medals, Phelps broke the record of six set by Ian Thorpe at the 2001 World Championships. The 4×100-meter medley relay team received a disqualification for a false start during a changeover in the heats, ending Phelps's chance of eight gold medals.

Even though Phelps competed in the backstroke in international competition only once (at the 2006 Pan Pacific Championships), he was among the best backstroke swimmers in the world. This is illustrated by his personal best times set in 2007, four months after the World Championships. At the U.S. Nationals in Indianapolis on August 1, 2007, Phelps swam a 1:54.65 in the 200-meter backstroke, which was the third fastest of all time in the event, 0.33 of a second off the world record of 1:54.32 held by Ryan Lochte. Two days later Phelps swam a time of 53.01 sec in the 100-meter backstroke, 0.03 of a second short of the world record of 52.98 held by Aaron Peirsol and the second-fastest performance of all time. In 2007 Phelps swam into the all-time top three performances in seven individual events, four of these being world records.

=== 2008 Summer Olympics ===
2008 Summer Olympics
Gold medal – first place	200 m freestyle	1:42.96 WR
Gold medal – first place	100 m butterfly	50.58 OR
Gold medal – first place	200 m butterfly	1:52.03 WR
Gold medal – first place	200 m medley	1:54.23 WR
Gold medal – first place	400 m medley	4:03.84 WR
Gold medal – first place	4×100 m freestyle	3:08.24 WR
Gold medal – first place	4×200 m freestyle	6:58.56 WR
Gold medal – first place	4×100 m medley	3:29.34 WR

==== Trials ====
At the 2008 U.S. Olympic Team Trials, Phelps competed in six individual events. In his first event, the 400-meter individual medley, Phelps broke his own world record of 4:06.22 with a time of 4:05.25. In his second event, the 200-meter freestyle, Phelps won with a time of 1:44.10, ahead of Peter Vanderkaay's time 1:45.85. In his third event, the 100-meter freestyle, Phelps placed second in his heat with a time of 47.92, ensuring him a spot on the relay. In his fourth event, the 200-meter butterfly, Phelps won with a time of 1:52.20. In his fifth event, the 200-meter individual medley, Phelps broke his own world record of 1:54.98 with a time of 1:54.80. In his sixth and final event, the 100-meter butterfly, Phelps won with a time of 50.89. When asked about his chances of winning eight gold medals in Beijing, Phelps said, "I am going to prepare for that meet just like I do every other meet ... There is only so much I can do in a month and then I am going to prepare myself the best that I can."

==== Beijing ====
Phelps set an Olympic record in the preliminary heats of the 400-meter individual medley. He followed that up in the final by winning the gold medal, as well as breaking his previous world record by nearly two seconds. This swim went on to become the longest men's world record to stand in long course meters, beating Germany's Otto Farr who held the 100 backstroke world record from 1912 until 1926.

Phelps swam the first leg of the 4×100-meter freestyle relay in a time of 47.51 seconds (an American record for the 100-meter freestyle), and won his second gold medal of the 2008 Olympics, as well as setting his second world record of the Olympics (3:08.24). Teammate Jason Lezak, after beginning the anchor leg more than half a body length behind Alain Bernard, managed to finish ahead of the favored French swimmer by eight hundredths of a second. The top five teams in the final finished ahead of the world record of 3:12.23 set the previous day by the American B team in a preliminary heat. Phelps remarked that Bernard's pre-race comments of "smashing the Americans" had "fired me up more than anything else". Le Nouvel Observateur noted "Phelps taking the time to applaud and console Bernard" and wrote that this sportsmanship was "proof that the person who swims in the wake of Mark Spitz is also a great gentleman."

For his third race, Phelps broke his previous world record in the 200-meter freestyle by nearly a second and won his third gold medal. He also set his third world record at the Olympics, 1:42.96, winning by nearly two seconds over silver medalist Park Tae-hwan. In this race, Phelps became the fifth Olympic athlete in modern history to win nine gold medals, joining Mark Spitz, Larisa Latynina, Paavo Nurmi, and Carl Lewis.

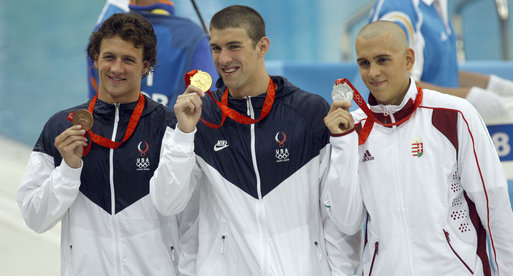
Phelps holds his gold medal on the podium on August 10, 2008. Pictured with Ryan Lochte and László Cseh.

The next day, Phelps participated in two finals. In his first event, the 200-meter butterfly, Phelps made it four gold medals and world records in four events by swimming the final in 1:52.03, defeating silver medalist László Cseh by almost seven-tenths of a second despite his goggles' having filled up with water and being unable to "see anything for the last 100 meters". This fourth gold medal was his tenth, and made him the all-time leader for most Olympic gold medals won by an individual in the modern Olympic era. Moreover, Phelps became the first swimmer, male or female, to win three Olympic butterfly titles, after his two titles in the Athens 2004 Olympics. He also became the first swimmer to successfully defend an Olympic butterfly title.

Less than one hour after his gold medal victory in the 200-meter butterfly, Phelps swam the lead-off leg of the 4×200-meter freestyle relay. With Lochte, Ricky Berens, and Peter Vanderkaay, he won his fifth gold and set his fifth world record as the American team finished first with a time of 6:58.56. The Americans were the first team to break the seven-minute mark in the relay, and broke the previous record, set in Melbourne, Australia, by more than four and a half seconds.

After taking a day off from finals (Phelps did swim in qualifying heats), Phelps won his sixth gold of the Beijing Games on August 15 by winning the 200-meter individual medley with a world record time of 1:54.23, finishing ahead of Cseh by over two seconds.

===== Seventh gold medal =====
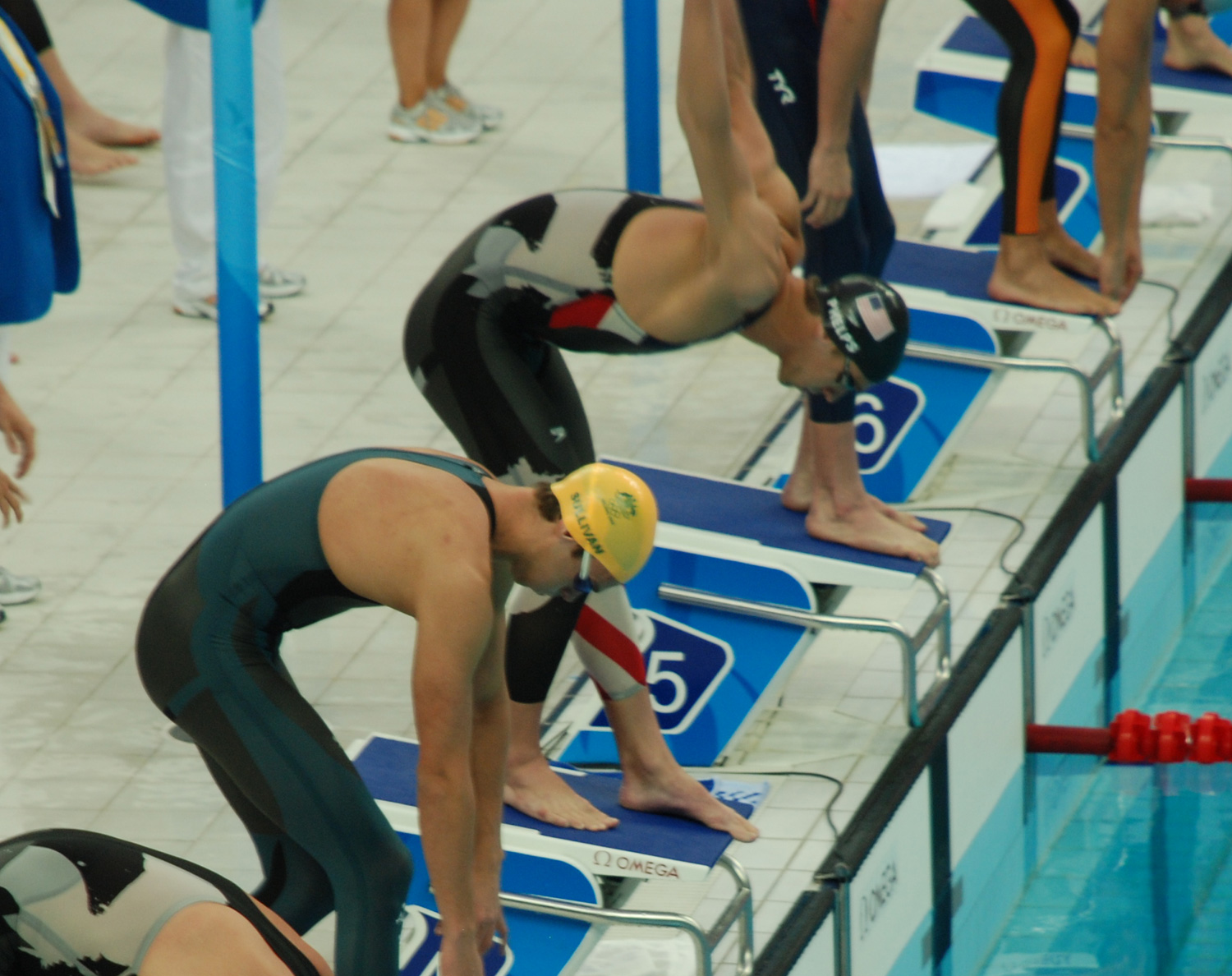
Phelps (in black cap) starting the 4 × 100 m relay at the Beijing Olympic Games, August 11, 2008

Before the final of the 100-meter butterfly, U.S. born Serbian swimmer Milorad Čavić caused a minor stir when he said it would be "good" if Phelps lost. "It'd be good for him if he loses. It would be nice if historians talk about Michael Phelps winning seven gold medals and losing the eighth to 'some guy.' I'd like to be that guy", Čavić said. Phelps responded, "When people say things like that, it fires me up more than anything." On August 16, Phelps won his seventh gold medal of the Games in the men's 100-meter butterfly, setting an Olympic record for the event with a time of 50.58 seconds and edging out his nearest competitor Čavić, by one hundredth (0.01) of a second.

Unlike all six of his previous events in the 2008 Games, Phelps did not set a new world record, leaving intact Ian Crocker's world-record time of 50.40 seconds, set in 2005.

Phelps's finish 0.01 seconds ahead of Čavić prompted the Serbian delegation to file a protest. Subsequent analysis of the video by the FINA panel, which required analyzing frames shot 1/10,000th of a second apart, was used to officially confirm Phelps's victory, but the images were not immediately released to the press. The initial refusal by official timekeeper Omega to release underwater photos of the finish also raised questions due to Phelps's sponsorship relationship with Omega. Čavić later wrote in his blog, "People, this is the greatest moment of my life. If you ask me, it should be accepted and we should move on. I've accepted defeat, and there's nothing wrong with losing to the greatest swimmer there has ever been."

Epic. It goes to show you that not only is this guy the greatest swimmer of all time and the greatest Olympian of all time, he's maybe the greatest athlete of all time. He's the greatest racer who ever walked the planet.

— Mark Spitz (2008), on Phelps winning his 7th gold medal.

Phelps's seventh gold medal of the Games tied Mark Spitz's record for gold medals won in a single Olympic Games, set in the 1972 Olympics. It was also his fifth individual gold medal in Beijing, tying the record for individual gold medals at a single Games originally set by Eric Heiden in the 1980 Winter Olympics and equaled by Vitaly Scherbo at the 1992 Summer Games. Said Phelps upon setting his seventh-straight Olympic record of the Games in as many events, "Dream as big as you can dream, and anything is possible ... I am sort of in a dream world. Sometimes I have to pinch myself to make sure it is real."

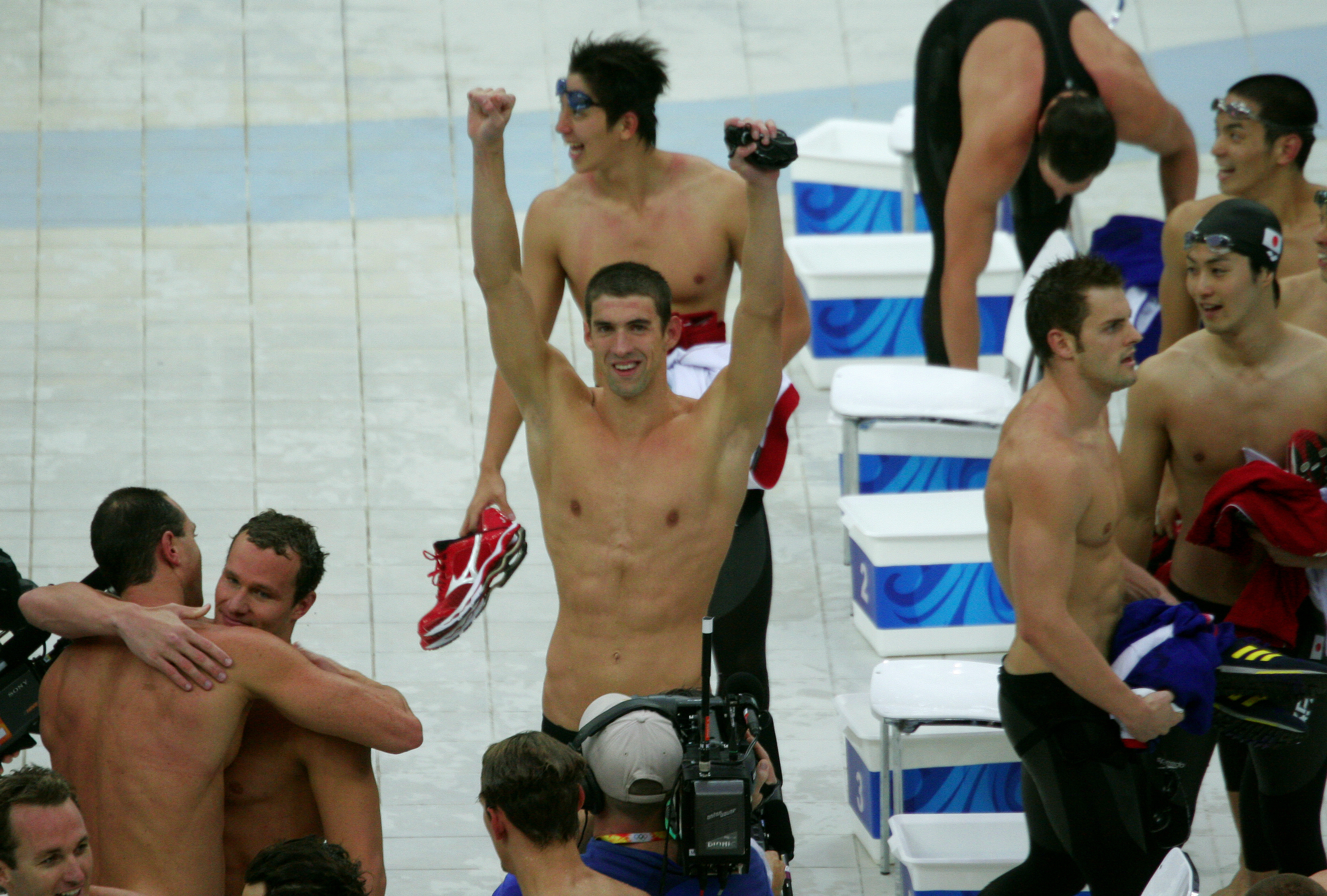
Michael Phelps celebrates with his teammates after winning his 8th gold medal.

===== All-time record =====
On August 17, Phelps won his eighth gold medal in the 4×100-meter medley relay, breaking Mark Spitz's record of seven gold medals won in a single Olympic Games, which had stood since 1972. Phelps, along with teammates Brendan Hansen, Aaron Peirsol, and Jason Lezak, set a new world record in the event with a time of 3 minutes and 29.34 seconds, 0.7 seconds ahead of second-place Australia and 1.34 seconds faster than the previous record set by the United States at the 2004 Olympic Games in Athens. When Phelps dived in to swim the 100-meter butterfly leg, the third leg of the 400-meter medley, the United States had been trailing Australia and Japan. Phelps completed his split in 50.1 seconds, the fastest butterfly split ever for the event, giving teammate Jason Lezak a more than half-second lead for the final leg, which he held onto to clinch the event in world record time. Said Phelps, upon completing the event that awarded him his eighth gold medal and eighth Olympic record in as many events, "Records are always made to be broken no matter what they are ... Anybody can do anything that they set their mind to."

==== Performance-enhancing drugs testing ====
During the 2008 Olympics, Phelps was questioned by the press as to whether perhaps his feats were "too good to be true", a reference to unsupported rumors that Phelps might be taking performance-enhancing substances. In response, Phelps noted that he had signed up for Project Believe, a project by the United States Anti-Doping Agency in which U.S. Olympians can volunteer to be tested in excess of the World Anti-Doping Agency guidelines. During the Games, Phelps passed all nine tests that were administered to him.

=== 2009 World Championships ===
2009 World Championships
Gold medal – first place	100 m butterfly	49.82 WR
Gold medal – first place	200 m butterfly	1:51.51 WR
Gold medal – first place	4×100 m freestyle	3:09.21 CR
Gold medal – first place	4×200 m freestyle	6:58.55 WR
Gold medal – first place	4×100 m medley	3:27.28 WR
Silver medal – second place	200 m freestyle	1:43.22

At the 2009 National Championships, Phelps drastically shortened his program, swimming in only three individual events. In his first event, the 200-meter freestyle, Phelps won with a time of 1:44.23. In his second event, the 200-meter butterfly, Phelps easily won with a time of 1:52.76, 0.88 seconds ahead of the second-place finisher. In his third event, the 100-meter butterfly, Phelps won with a world-record time of 50.22.

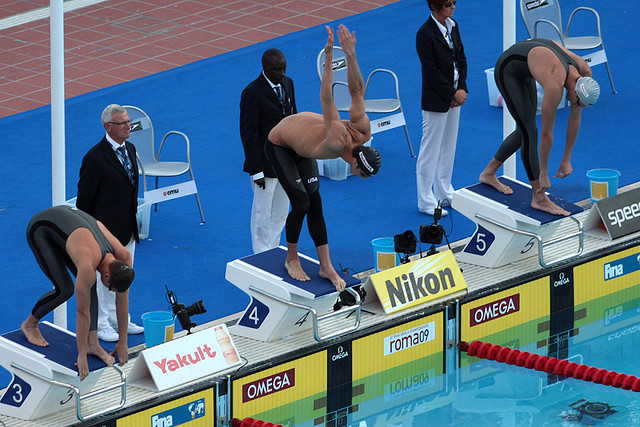
Phelps (center) before the start of the 200-meter butterfly semi-final during 2009 FINA World Championships

At the 2009 World Aquatics Championships, Phelps won a total of 6 medals, 5 golds and 1 silver. In his first event, the 4×100-meter freestyle relay, Phelps swam the lead-off leg in 47.78, well off his 47.51 performance in Beijing, but the American team was able to edge out Russia and France for the gold. For his second race, the 200-meter freestyle, Phelps lost his first race in four years to Germany's Paul Biedermann. Phelps touched second in 1:43.22, but Biedermann smashed Phelps's record of 1:42.96 set in Beijing a year ago with a time of 1:42.00. Phelps took the silver graciously, but coach Bob Bowman threatened to withdraw Phelps from international competition because Bowman claimed Biedermann had an unfair advantage because he was wearing a full polyurethane swimsuit, specifically an Arena X-Glide. Bowman said, "It took me five years to get Michael from 1:46 to 1:42 and this guy has done it in 11 months. That's an amazing training performance. I'd like to know how to do that." Phelps rebounded from this loss and for his third race, the 200-meter butterfly, Phelps won the gold and broke his own world record of 1:52.03 with a time of 1:51.51. For his fourth race, the 4×200-meter freestyle relay, Phelps swam the lead-off leg in 1:44.49 as the team went on to win the gold medal and break the world record set the previous year. After his loss in the 200-meter freestyle, many thought Phelps was vulnerable coming into the final for the 100-meter butterfly. His closest competitor, Milorad Čavić, who wore an Arena X-Glide (the same suit Biedermann beat Phelps with), thought people were making excuses for Phelps because he was wearing an LZR Racer. Čavić even offered to buy Phelps a new suit. For his fifth race, the 100-meter butterfly, Phelps won the gold and became the first man to complete it in under 50 seconds, beating Čavić 49.82 to 49.95. The victory prompted a fierce celebration from Phelps. For his final event, the 4×100-meter medley relay, Phelps won his fifth gold medal. Phelps, along with teammates Aaron Peirsol, Eric Shanteau, and David Walters, set a new world record in the event with a time of 3 minutes, 27.28 seconds.

Several months prior to the championships, a photograph of Phelps using a bong went viral; this resulted in the loss of Kellogg's as a sponsor, as well as a three-month suspension by USA Swimming. Phelps admitted that the photo, which was taken at a party at the University of South Carolina, was authentic. He publicly apologized, calling his behavior "inappropriate".

=== 2010 Pan Pacific Championships ===
2010 Pan Pacific Championships
Gold medal – first place	100 m butterfly	50.86 CR
Gold medal – first place	200 m butterfly	1:54.11
Gold medal – first place	4×100 m freestyle	3:11.74 CR
Gold medal – first place	4×200 m freestyle	7:03.84 CR
Gold medal – first place	4×100 m medley	3:32.48

At the 2010 National Championships, Phelps competed in five individual events. In the 200-meter freestyle, Phelps won ahead of Ryan Lochte in a time of 1:45.61. About an hour later, Phelps returned to the pool to win the 200-meter butterfly. But Phelps was not happy with his performance and called it the "worst" 200-meter butterfly of his life. In the 100-meter butterfly, Phelps won his 50th national title in 50.65. After the race, Phelps said he was "fairly pleased" with the result. In the 200-meter individual medley, Phelps finished second to Lochte 1:55.94 to 1:54.84. It was the first time Lochte had beat Phelps in a major national meet. In the 200-meter backstroke, Phelps finished in 4th place in 1:56.98.

On the first day of competition at the 2010 Pan Pacific Swimming Championships, Phelps opted out swimming in the final of the 200-meter freestyle to focus on the 200-meter butterfly. In the 200-meter butterfly, Phelps led from start to finish, coming in first with a time of 1:54.11. Although it was much slower than his 1:51.51 time from the previous year, Phelps had not lost a 200-meter butterfly final since 2002. On day two of the competition, Phelps swam in the heats of the 400-meter individual medley and contributed in the 4×200-meter freestyle relay. In the heats of the 400-meter individual medley, Phelps failed to make the A final, with Lochte and Tyler Clary taking the top two American positions. Phelps did not swim in the B final of the 400-meter individual medley. In the 4×200-meter freestyle relay, Phelps, with Peter Vanderkaay, Ricky Berens, and Lochte, finished first ahead of Japan and Australia. On day three of the competition, Phelps competed in the 100-meter butterfly and contributed in the 4×100-meter freestyle relay. In the 100-meter butterfly, Phelps finished first in a time of 50.86, a championship record. In the 4×100-meter freestyle relay, Phelps, with Lochte, Jason Lezak, and Nathan Adrian, finished first ahead of Australia and South Africa. As the lead-off leg in the 4×100-meter freestyle relay, Phelps set the championship record in the 100-meter freestyle with a time of 48.13. In his final event, Phelps swam in the 4×100-meter medley relay with Aaron Peirsol, Mark Gangloff, and Adrian and finished first ahead of Japan and Australia.

=== 2011 World Championships ===
2011 World Championships
Gold medal – first place	100 m butterfly	50.71
Gold medal – first place	200 m butterfly	1:53.34
Gold medal – first place	4×200 m freestyle	7:02.67
Gold medal – first place	4×100 m medley	3:32.06
Silver medal – second place	200 m freestyle	1:44.79
Silver medal – second place	200 m medley	1:54.16
Bronze medal – third place	4×100 m freestyle	3:11.96

In his first event at the 2011 World Aquatics Championships in Shanghai, Phelps won bronze in the 4×100-meter freestyle relay with Garrett Weber-Gale, Jason Lezak, and Nathan Adrian. This was Phelps's first bronze in a World Aquatics Championships. Phelps swam the lead-off leg in 48.08, the second-best lead-off in the field behind James Magnussen's 47.49. In his second event, the 200-meter freestyle, Phelps won silver for the second consecutive time at a World Aquatics Championships. This time he finished second to Ryan Lochte in the event with a time of 1:44.79, compared to Lochte's time of 1:44.44. In his third final, the 200-meter butterfly, he won his first gold medal with a time of 1:53.34 to become the first swimmer to win five gold medals in one discipline at the World Aquatics Championships.

In his fourth event, the 200-meter individual medley, Phelps again finished second to Lochte in a personal best of 1:54.16, which was 0.16 behind Lochte who swam a new world record. It was Phelps's 30th medal in the World Aquatics Championships. Shortly after completing the semi-finals of the 100-meter butterfly, Phelps competed in the 4×200-meter freestyle relay with Peter Vanderkaay, Ricky Berens, and Ryan Lochte. Phelps's team won the gold medal in a time of 7:02.67. Phelps swam the lead-off leg in 1:45.53, the third-best leg in the field. In the 100-meter butterfly, Phelps won his third consecutive title (also winning in 2007 and 2009) and second individual title of the meet with a time of 50.71. In his last event, the 4×100-meter medley relay, Phelps teamed with Nick Thoman, Mark Gangloff, and Nathan Adrian to win gold in a time of 3:32.06. Phelps's butterfly leg of 50.57 was by far the fastest butterfly leg in the field.

=== 2012 Summer Olympics ===
2012 Summer Olympics
Gold medal – first place	100 m butterfly	51.21
Gold medal – first place	200 m medley	1:54.27
Gold medal – first place	4×200 m freestyle	6:59.70
Gold medal – first place	4×100 m medley	3:29.35
Silver medal – second place	200 m butterfly	1:53.01
Silver medal – second place	4×100 m freestyle	3:10.38

==== Trials ====
For the 2012 Summer Olympics in London, Phelps originally stated he would never do eight events again, and would instead try new events. Phelps said, "I keep saying I want to go down and start sprinting, but Bob [Bowman, Phelps's coach] really isn't so keen on that ... I don't think that's going to happen ... Over the next four years, I'd like to try some different events, maybe not do some of the events I did here." However, at the 2012 United States Olympic Trials, the qualifying meet for the 2012 Summer Olympics, Phelps qualified in the same eight events that he swam in Beijing in 2008. He later dropped the 200-meter freestyle from his program, as he stated he wanted to focus on the 4×100-meter freestyle relay. During the trials, Phelps finished first in the 200-meter freestyle, 100-meter butterfly, 200-meter butterfly, 200-meter individual medley, and second in the 400-meter individual medley. In making his fourth Olympic team, Phelps holds the record for men for the most Olympic appearances in swimming representing the United States.

==== London ====
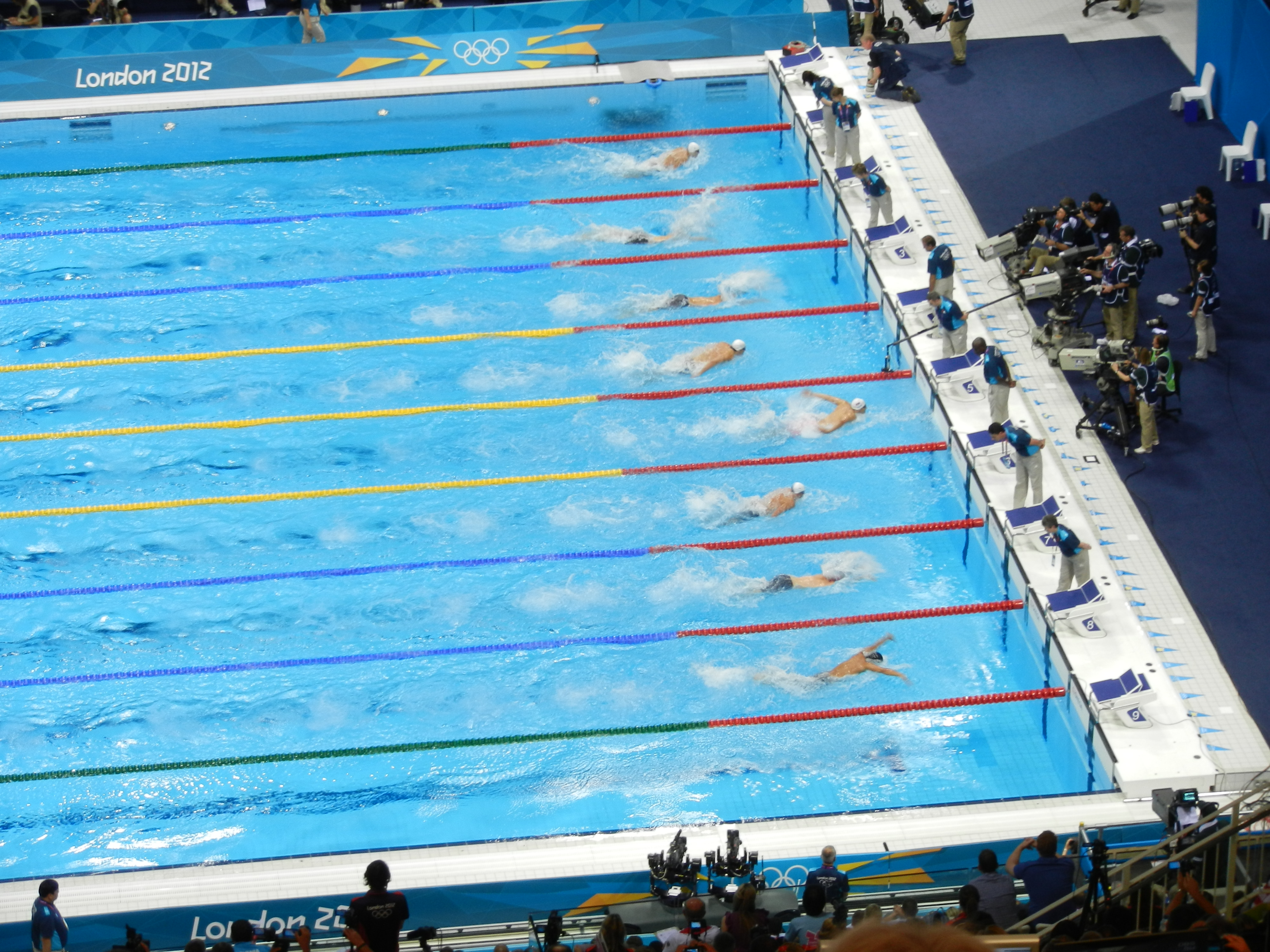
In his 100m butterfly heat, Phelps (fourth from top) was 8th at the 50m split before winning his heat and qualifying for the semi-finals

On July 28, 2012, Phelps placed eighth in the morning prelims for the 400-meter individual medley. Phelps, the two-time defending Olympic champion, won his heat in 4 minutes, 13.33 seconds with a time that was well off his world record of 4:03.84 set four years earlier in Beijing, when Phelps won a record eight gold medals. He out-touched László Cseh by 0.07 seconds in his heat to qualify last for the final, locking out Cseh. In his first finals of the Summer Olympics, Phelps placed fourth behind fellow American Ryan Lochte, Thiago Pereira of Brazil, and Kosuke Hagino of Japan in the 400-meter individual medley. It was the first time Phelps failed to medal in an Olympic event since 2000. The next night, in his second event of the Games, he got a silver as a member of the 4×100-meter free relay. Phelps swam the fastest leg of the U.S. relay team and the second-fastest of anyone in the race.

On July 31, 2012, Phelps won a silver medal in the 200-meter butterfly behind South African Chad le Clos by 5/100ths of a second, and a gold medal in the 4×200-meter freestyle relay, thereby equaling and then surpassing Larisa Latynina to become the all-time record holder for most Olympic medals won. Latynina was present at the race and asked the International Olympic Committee to be the presenter of Phelps's medal, but was told that Olympic rules would not allow it. She called Phelps deserving of the record.

On August 2, 2012, Phelps won his 16th Olympic gold medal when he edged out Ryan Lochte to win the 200-meter individual medley with a time of 1:54.27, and by that victory also became the first male swimmer to win the same event in three consecutive Olympics. Rebecca Soni and Phelps (twice) are the only swimmers to successfully defend an individual title from the 2008 Games. This win also marked Phelps's fifth Olympic title in the individual medley, breaking the record of four shared by Hungarian Tamás Darnyi and Ukrainian Yana Klochkova.

He repeated the achievement of winning the same event at three Olympics the following evening, winning the Olympic gold medal in the 100 m butterfly, his last individual event. After two very close victories in the 100 m butterfly at the 2004 and 2008 Olympics (by 0.04 and 0.01 sec, respectively), in this race Phelps beat Le Clos and Yevgeny Korotyshkin, who tied for silver, by 0.23 sec.

Phelps's final event was the 4×100-meter medley relay in which he went on to win his 18th career gold medal and his 22nd overall. By winning 4 gold and 2 silver medals, Phelps concluded the 2012 Olympics as the most successful swimmer of the meet for the third Olympics in a row. After his last event, the international swimming federation FINA honored Phelps with an award commemorating his standing as the most decorated Olympian ever.

After the 2012 Olympics, Phelps retired from swimming, stating: "I'm done. I'm finished. I'm retired. I'm done. No more," and that "I just wanted to be done with swimming and didn't want anything to do with the sport anymore."

=== 2014 comeback from retirement ===
2014 Pan Pacific Championships
Gold medal – first place	100 m butterfly	51.29
Gold medal – first place	4×200 m freestyle	7:05.17
Gold medal – first place	4×100 m medley	3:29.94 CR
Silver medal – second place	200 m medley	1:56.04
Silver medal – second place	4×100 m freestyle	3:13.36

In April 2014, Phelps announced he would come out of retirement, and would enter an event later that month. In May 2014, he won the 100-meter butterfly event at the Arena Grand Prix in Charlotte, North Carolina. Phelps was reportedly motivated by the national team's failure to win the men's 4 × 100 m freestyle relay since their Beijing 2008 and Rome 2009 titles. The relationship between Phelps and coach Bob Bowman had deteriorated in the preparations for London 2012, so Phelps convinced a skeptical Bowman that he "wasn't training for history. He wasn't training for the medals. He wasn't even training for all the fans. This time Phelps wanted to swim for himself...and enjoy the journey". Since his returning from retirement in 2014, Phelps "scaled back his calorie intake" and "increased his postswim ice baths". By the 2016 Olympic Trials, despite his age Phelps "felt physically stronger in the water, perhaps because of drills Bowman added to his pool workouts, like multiple repeats of 40 seconds of dolphin kicking while hugging a 10-pound weight to his chest".

=== 2015 U.S. Nationals ===
After having been dropped from the team for the 2015 World Aquatics Championships for a DUI, Phelps instead competed in the U.S. National Championships in San Antonio as his target meet of the summer. He won gold medals in the 100-meter butterfly (50.45 s), 200-meter butterfly (1:52.94), and the 200-meter individual medley (1:54.75). In each of these events he swam the fastest time in the world for 2015.

In December 2015 at the Winter Nationals in Federal Way, Phelps won titles in the same three events, again in long course, bringing his career total to 62 national titles.

=== 2016 Summer Olympics ===
2016 Summer Olympics
Gold medal – first place	200 m butterfly	1:53.36
Gold medal – first place	200 m medley	1:54.66
Gold medal – first place	4×100 m freestyle	3:09.92
Gold medal – first place	4×200 m freestyle	7:00.66
Gold medal – first place	4×100 m medley	3:27.95 OR
Silver medal – second place	100 m butterfly	51.14

==== Trials ====
At the U.S. trials in Omaha for the 2016 Summer Olympics, Phelps won the 200 m butterfly (1:54.84), the 200 m individual medley (1:55.91), and the 100 m butterfly (51.00 s) events. This made him the first American male swimmer, and the second American swimmer overall after Dara Torres, to qualify for a fifth Olympics. Phelps's 100 m freestyle times at the Trials were not impressive. However at a final training camp in Atlanta a week before heading to Rio, Phelps put out "the fourth-fastest flat-start time of the year" in a 100 free time trial, automatically securing one of the seven spots on the Men's 4 × 100 metre freestyle relay for the Olympics.

==== Rio de Janeiro ====
Phelps was chosen to be the American flag bearer at the opening ceremony, which was the first Olympic opening ceremony that he would attend. Phelps was also voted by the U.S. Olympic swim team as one of six team captains for the U.S. delegation to the Olympics. He displayed a relaxed, sociable demeanor in the athletes' village and in press conferences; this pleasant behavior was in stark contrast to his isolation in previous Olympics. He was accompanied by fiancée Nicole Johnson and son Boomer.

In his first event on August 7, the 4 × 100 m freestyle relay, he won his first gold medal of the 2016 Games and his 19th Olympic gold medal overall. Phelps swam the second leg with what his coach Bob Bowman described as "maybe the best turn that's ever been done", overtaking France's Fabien Gilot to give his American teammates a lead which they would not relinquish. Phelps's leg proved to be the decisive factor in the race, and Gilot later remarked "As fast as my teammates were, the extraterrestrial that is Phelps was faster". Phelps achieved a split time of 47.12, the fourth-fastest of the field (the three fastest times were posted by the team anchors), which was also faster than any of his relay splits at the last three Olympics.

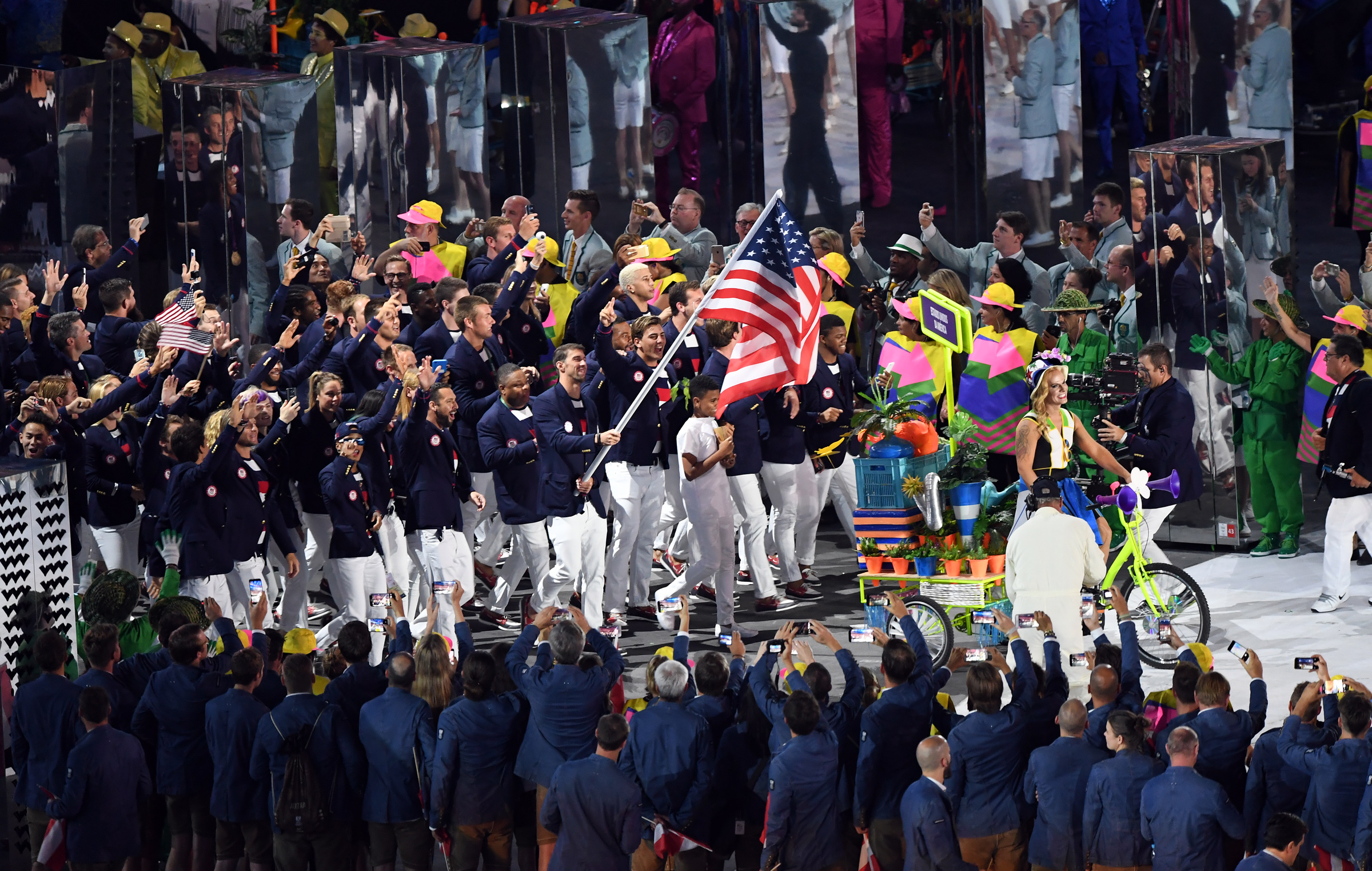
Phelps carrying the flag on behalf of athletes from the United States during the parade of nations within the 2016 Summer Olympics opening ceremony

In his second event on August 9, the 200-meter butterfly, he became the first swimmer in history to make five finals in the same event, after finishing 5th in 2000, 1st in 2004 and 2008, and 2nd in 2012. (Federica Pellegrini would be the second swimmer to do so at the 2020 Olympics.) At Rio, he won the title that he had lost to Chad le Clos four years earlier in London, edging Masato Sakai by 0.04 s. Phelps stated that winning back this title had been the main goal during his comeback. The preliminary and final of that event was heavily hyped as a rematch between Phelps and Le Clos. The relationship between Le Clos and Phelps had been cordial in 2012–13 but it deteriorated in 2014 when Phelps came back from retirement and suggested that the current butterfly times were slow. In the ready room prior to the preliminary race, Le Clos's shadow boxing while Phelps "glowered in a corner" spawned the Internet meme with the hashtag #PhelpsFace. At age 31, the victory made Phelps not only the oldest male champion, but also the oldest individual champion in Olympic swimming history, beating the records set by Duke Kahanamoku in 1920, and Inge de Bruijn in 2004 respectively. Phelps also became the first swimmer to win individual gold medals 12 years apart. Both these records were broken by Anthony Ervin three days later.

Also on August 9, Phelps won his 21st gold medal in the 4 × 200 m freestyle relay together with Conor Dwyer, Townley Haas, and Ryan Lochte. For Phelps and Lochte, this was their 4th consecutive gold medal in this event, an all-time record in swimming for any event.

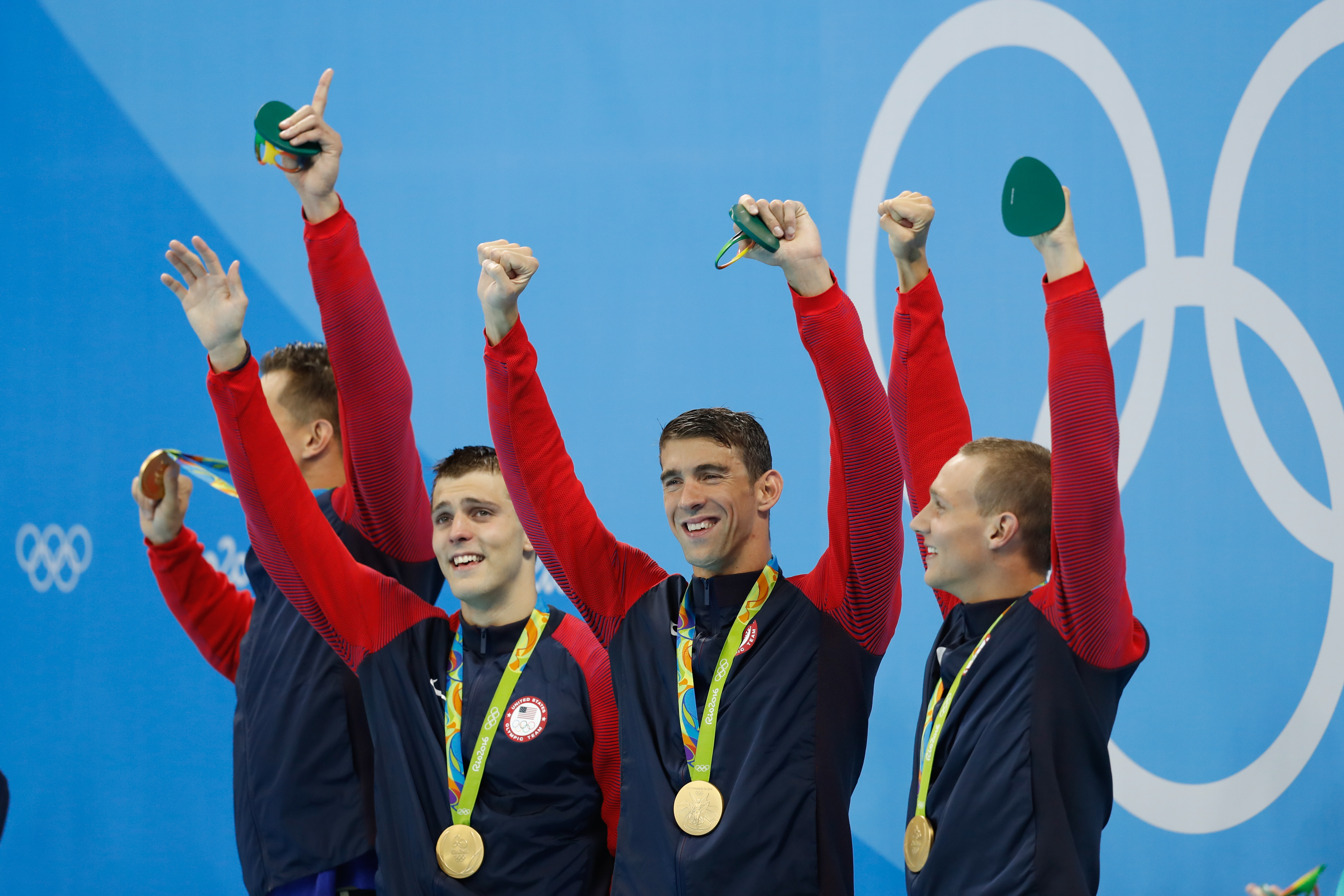
Phelps with Nathan Adrian, Ryan Held and Caeleb Dressel, after winning the 4 × 100 m freestyle relay

On August 11, Phelps won his 22nd gold medal in the 200 m individual medley. He beat Kosuke Hagino, the 400 m individual medley champion, by 1.95 seconds. This was Phelps's 4th consecutive gold medal in the event as well as his 4th in the Games. He became the first swimmer to win the same individual event four times, surpassing the previous record of three held by Dawn Fraser and Krisztina Egerszegi. He also became the third Olympian to win the same individual event four times, after athletes Al Oerter and Carl Lewis. With that 13th individual gold medal, Phelps broke an ancient Olympic record, set by Leonidas of Rhodes, who had held the most Olympic individual titles of all time, with twelve.

In the 100 m butterfly, Phelps was defeated in his last individual event of the Rio Olympics by Singaporean Joseph Schooling, when he earned joint silver along with Chad le Clos and László Cseh.

On August 13, in the 4 × 100-meter medley relay, Phelps ended his career with another gold medal, his 23rd at the Olympics and his 28th Olympic medal overall. Together with Ryan Murphy, Cody Miller, and Nathan Adrian, swimming as the butterfly leg of the medley, they broke the Olympic record, and won the United States' 1001st all-time Summer Olympics gold medal, in accordance with the IOC and USOC. Phelps retired from competitive swimming for good following the Rio Olympics.

Phelps's performance in the Rio Olympics was unique in "winning multiple gold medals at 31 years old, well beyond the typical peak for male swimmers". Phelps is considered one of the greatest Olympians of all time.

=== International long-course competition results ===
Meet	100 free	200 free	400 free	200 back	100 fly	200 fly	200 IM	400 IM	4×100 free	4×200 free	4×100 medley
OG 2000						5th					
WC 2001						1st place, gold medalist(s)					
PPC 2002						2nd place, silver medalist(s)	1st place, gold medalist(s)	1st place, gold medalist(s)		2nd place, silver medalist(s)	1st place, gold medalist(s)
WC 2003					2nd place, silver medalist(s)	1st place, gold medalist(s)	1st place, gold medalist(s)	1st place, gold medalist(s)		2nd place, silver medalist(s)	(gold) ^{[a]}
OG 2004		3rd place, bronze medalist(s)			1st place, gold medalist(s)	1st place, gold medalist(s)	1st place, gold medalist(s)	1st place, gold medalist(s)	3rd place, bronze medalist(s)	1st place, gold medalist(s)	(gold) ^{[a]}
WC 2005	7th	1st place, gold medalist(s)	18th		2nd place, silver medalist(s)		1st place, gold medalist(s)		1st place, gold medalist(s)	1st place, gold medalist(s)	(gold) ^{[a]}
PPC 2006				2nd place, silver medalist(s)		1st place, gold medalist(s)	1st place, gold medalist(s)	1st place, gold medalist(s)	1st place, gold medalist(s)	1st place, gold medalist(s)	
WC 2007		1st place, gold medalist(s)			1st place, gold medalist(s)	1st place, gold medalist(s)	1st place, gold medalist(s)	1st place, gold medalist(s)	1st place, gold medalist(s)	1st place, gold medalist(s)	
OG 2008		1st place, gold medalist(s)			1st place, gold medalist(s)	1st place, gold medalist(s)	1st place, gold medalist(s)	1st place, gold medalist(s)	1st place, gold medalist(s)	1st place, gold medalist(s)	1st place, gold medalist(s)
WC 2009		2nd place, silver medalist(s)			1st place, gold medalist(s)	1st place, gold medalist(s)			1st place, gold medalist(s)	1st place, gold medalist(s)	1st place, gold medalist(s)
PPC 2010					1st place, gold medalist(s)	1st place, gold medalist(s)		h^{[b]}	1st place, gold medalist(s)	1st place, gold medalist(s)	1st place, gold medalist(s)
WC 2011		2nd place, silver medalist(s)			1st place, gold medalist(s)	1st place, gold medalist(s)	2nd place, silver medalist(s)		3rd place, bronze medalist(s)	1st place, gold medalist(s)	1st place, gold medalist(s)
OG 2012					1st place, gold medalist(s)	2nd place, silver medalist(s)	1st place, gold medalist(s)	4th	2nd place, silver medalist(s)	1st place, gold medalist(s)	1st place, gold medalist(s)
WC 2013											
PPC 2014	4th				1st place, gold medalist(s)		2nd place, silver medalist(s)		2nd place, silver medalist(s)	1st place, gold medalist(s)	1st place, gold medalist(s)
WC 2015											
OG 2016					2nd place, silver medalist(s)	1st place, gold medalist(s)	1st place, gold medalist(s)		1st place, gold medalist(s)	1st place, gold medalist(s)	1st place, gold medalist(s)

^{a} Phelps swam only in the heats. Swimmers who only participated in the heats received medals as well.
^{b} Phelps finished fourth in the heats, but he was the third American, hence he did not qualify for the final.

=== Personal bests ===
==== Long course (50 m pool) ====
Event	Time		Meet	Location	Date	Notes
50 m freestyle	22.93	r †	2009 World Championships	Rome, Italy	July 26, 2009	
100 m freestyle	47.51	r	2008 Summer Olympics	Beijing, China	August 11, 2008	Former AM
200 m freestyle	1:42.96		2008 Summer Olympics	Beijing, China	August 12, 2008	AM, Former WR
400 m freestyle	3:46.73		2003 U.S. National Championships	College Park, Maryland, United States	August 8, 2003	Former AM
1500 m freestyle	15:34.18		2007 Eric Namesnik Memorial Grand Prix	Ann Arbor, Michigan, United States	May 19, 2007	
100 m backstroke	53.01		2007 U.S. National Championships	Indianapolis, Indiana, United States	August 3, 2007	
200 m backstroke	1:54.65		2007 U.S. National Championships	Indianapolis, Indiana, United States	August 1, 2007	
100 m breaststroke	1:02.54		2010 NBAC Long Course Championships	Baltimore, Maryland, United States	June 11, 2010	
200 m breaststroke	2:11.30		2015 U.S. National Championships	San Antonio, Texas, United States	August 10, 2015	
100 m butterfly	49.82		2009 World Championships	Rome, Italy	August 1, 2009	Former WR
200 m butterfly	1:51.51		2009 World Championships	Rome, Italy	July 29, 2009	AM, Former WR
200 m individual medley	1:54.16		2011 World Championships	Shanghai, China	July 28, 2011	
400 m individual medley	4:03.84		2008 Summer Olympics	Beijing, China	August 10, 2008	AM, Former WR

Legend: WR – World record; AM – Americas record; e – equalled existing record;
Records not set in finals: h – heat; sf – semifinal; r – relay 1st leg; rh – relay heat 1st leg; b – B final; † – en route to final mark; so – swim-off; tt – time trial

==== Short course (25 m pool) ====
Event	Time	Meet	Location	Date	Notes
100 m freestyle	46.99	2009 Duel in the Pool	Manchester, United Kingdom	December 18, 2009	
200 m freestyle	1:42.78	2005–06 World Cup	East Meadow, New York, United States	February 4, 2006	Former AM
1500 m freestyle	15:29.40	2000–01 World Cup	Paris, France	January 28, 2001	
200 m backstroke	1:50.34	2011 World Cup	Berlin, Germany	October 23, 2011	
100 m butterfly	50.46	2009 Duel in the Pool	Manchester, United Kingdom	December 18, 2009	
200 m butterfly	1:52.26	2009 World Cup	Berlin, Germany	November 14, 2009	Former NR
100 m individual medley	51.65	2011 World Cup	Berlin, Germany	October 22, 2011	
200 m individual medley	1:51.89	2011 World Cup	Berlin, Germany	October 23, 2011	
400 m individual medley	4:01.49	2011 World Cup	Berlin, Germany	October 22, 2011	

Legend: AM – Americas record; NR – American record; e – equalled existing record;
Records not set in finals: h – heat; sf – semifinal; r – relay 1st leg; rh – relay heat 1st leg; b – B final; † – en route to final mark; so – swim-off; tt – time trial

== Video game ==
In 2011, Michael Phelps: Push the Limit, an Xbox 360/Kinect game, was released, which promised to bring "the fun, fitness and excitement of head-to-head swimming to your living room." The game received a lukewarm review from ABC News, which observed that "the title would have been better as cheap downloadable content or packaged in a larger Olympic sports world."

== Personal life ==
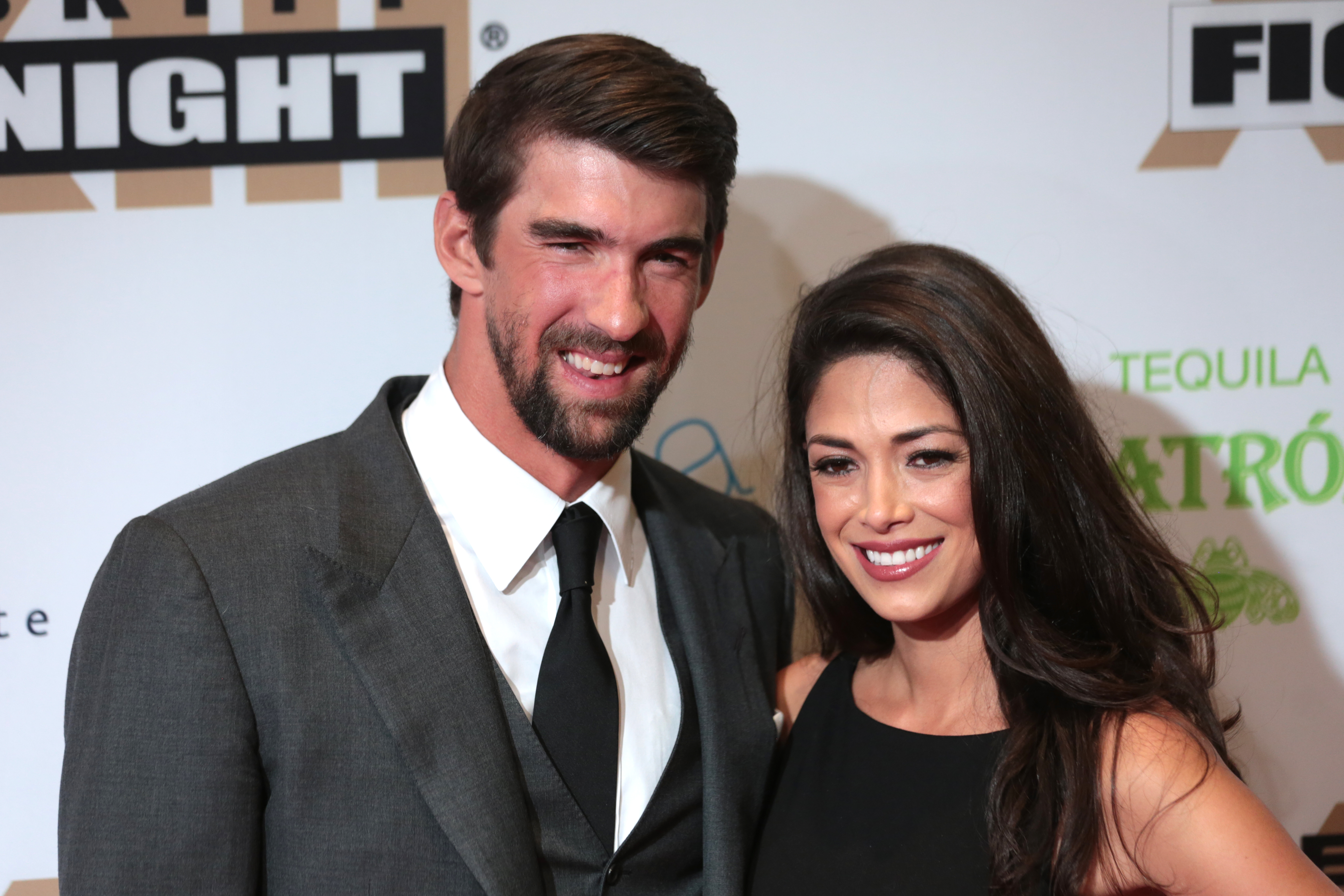
Phelps with his wife, Nicole Johnson

Bob Bowman described Phelps as "a solitary man" with a "rigid focus" at the pool prior to a race, but afterward "a man incredibly invested in the success of the people he cares about". He states that "he's unbelievably kind-hearted", recounting Phelps' interaction with young children after practices.

Phelps is married to former Miss California USA Nicole Johnson. They secretly married on June 13, 2016, and the marriage was not publicly reported until four months later. They met in 2007 at the ESPYs, broke up in 2008, later got back together but broke up again in 2010. In 2012 they started to reconcile and ultimately got engaged in February 2015. They have four sons together. The family lives in Paradise Valley, Arizona, where Phelps volunteered alongside Bowman as an assistant coach for the Arizona State Sun Devils swim team.

As a teenager, Phelps idolized Australian swimmer Ian Thorpe and modeled his public image after Thorpe. Thorpe initially said that it would be highly unlikely for Phelps to win eight gold medals at the 2008 Summer Olympics in Beijing. Phelps used the remarks as motivation and taped the words to his locker during the Games. Thorpe was in the stands for the 4×100-meter medley relay, where Phelps was swimming for his eighth Olympic gold medal. When Phelps and his teammates captured the gold, Thorpe gave a congratulatory kiss to Phelps's mother, then gave a handshake and a hug to congratulate Phelps. Afterwards, Thorpe said "I'm really proud of him not just because he won eight golds. Rather, it's how much he has grown up and matured into a great human being. Never in my life have I been so happy to have been proved wrong."

Phelps is an avid golfer, and has competed in numerous amateur and pro-am golf tournaments; he considered becoming a professional golfer after retiring from swimming. At the 2012 Alfred Dunhill Links Championship, a pro-am tournament in which he was paired with golfer Paul Casey, Phelps set the world record for the longest televised putt in history, sinking a putt from 159 feet away.

Phelps has also cited Michael Jordan as a sporting idol of his, and stated that "he changed the sport of basketball". Phelps is also a fan of the Baltimore Ravens and stated that he found his life purpose and desire to compete in the 2016 Summer Olympics after seeking Ray Lewis's advice.

In January 2018, Phelps revealed that he has struggled both with ADHD and depression, having contemplated suicide after the 2012 Olympics.

His father Fred died in 2022. Phelps made a tributary post on Instagram for his father on October 24.

Phelps is a minority shareholder in the Premier League club Leeds United.

=== Legal issues ===
At age 19 in November 2004, Phelps was arrested for driving under the influence of alcohol in Salisbury, Maryland. He pleaded guilty to driving while impaired and was sentenced to serve 18 months of probation, fined $250, ordered to speak to high school students about drinking and driving, and to attend a Mothers Against Drunk Driving (MADD) meeting. When Phelps was later asked about the incident by Matt Lauer on the Today Show, he said that he had "let a lot of people in the country down".

In September 2014, Phelps was arrested again, this time on charges of driving under the influence of alcohol and speeding in Baltimore. As a result, USA Swimming suspended him from all competitions for six months, and stated he would not be chosen to represent the United States at the 2015 World Aquatics Championships in August. With Phelps off the team, the United States failed to qualify for the finals of the 4 × 100 m freestyle relay.

== Philanthropy ==
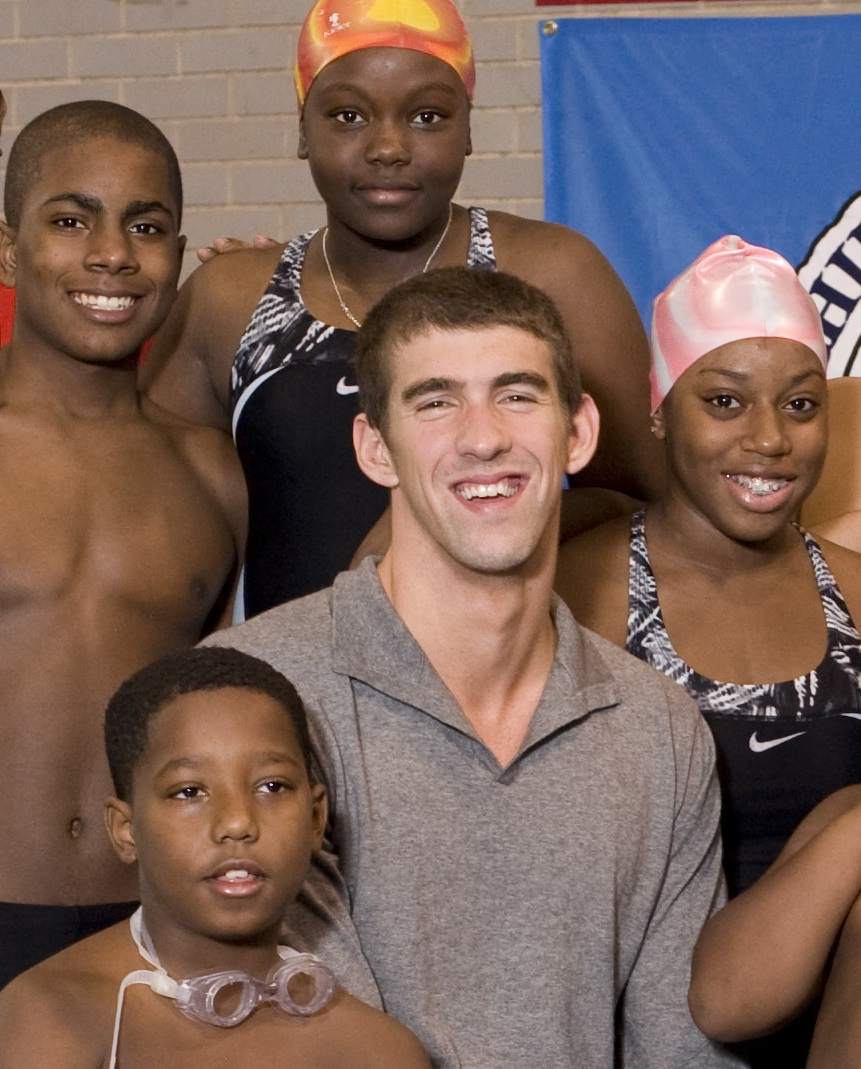
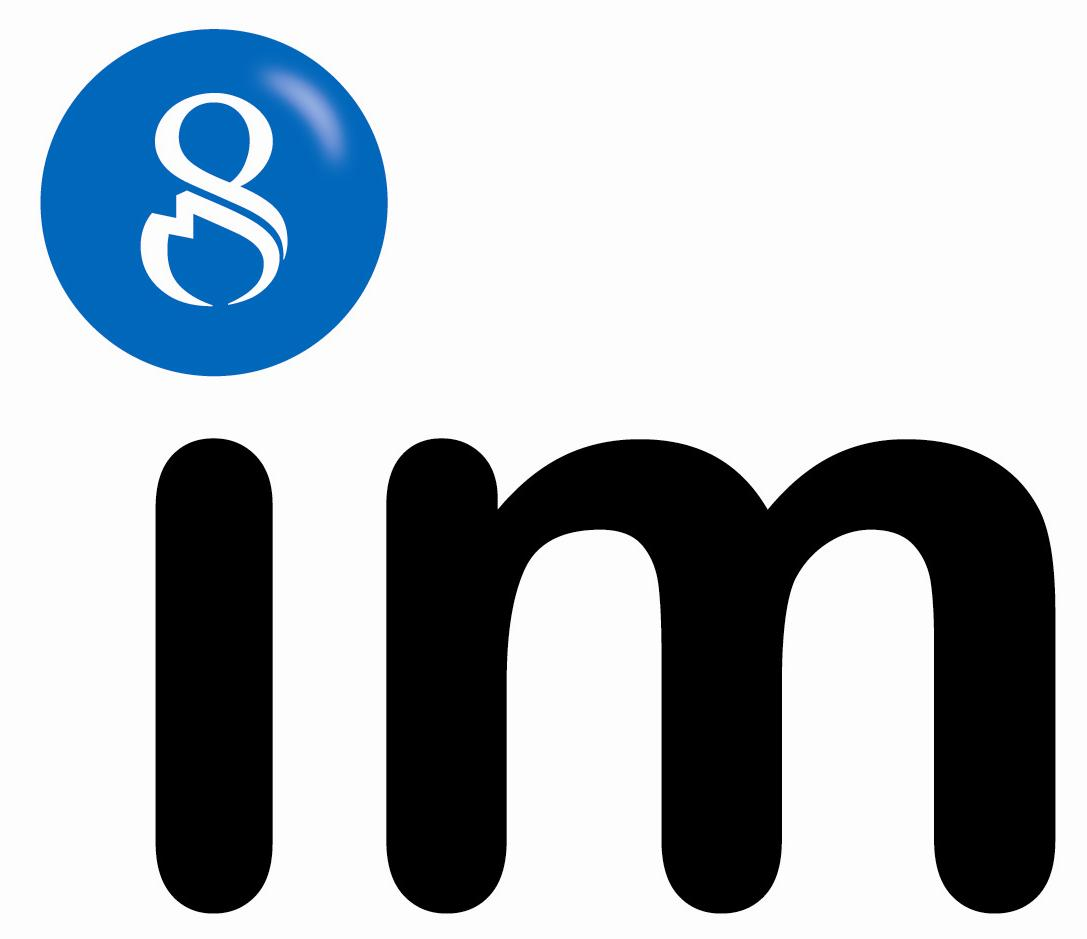
Phelps with im program participants (left), Phelps Foundation's im logo (right).

After the 2008 Olympics, Phelps used his $1 million Speedo bonus to set up the Michael Phelps Foundation. His foundation focuses on growing the sport of swimming and promoting healthier lifestyles.

In 2010, the Michael Phelps Foundation, the Michael Phelps Swim School and KidsHealth.org developed and nationally piloted the "im" program for Boys & Girls Club members. The im program teaches children the importance of being active and healthy, with a focus on the sport of swimming. It also promotes the value of planning and goal-setting. im is offered through the Boys & Girls Clubs of America and through Special Olympics International. The Foundation has since developed two other programs, Level Field Fund-Swimming and Caps-for-a-Cause.

The Foundation's largest event is its annual fundraiser, the Michael Phelps Foundation Golf Classic. Phelps stated he hoped to work with his Foundation more after retirement from competition following the 2012 Summer Olympics in London.

In 2017, Phelps joined the board of Medibio, a company focused on diagnosis of mental health disorders.

== World records ==
Phelps has set 39 world records (29 individual, 10 relay), which is more records than any other swimmer that is recognized by FINA; this achievement surpassed Mark Spitz's previous record of 33 world records (26 individual, 7 relay). However, Johnny Weissmuller is reported to have broken 67 official world records.

All but two of the records were set in a long-course (50-meter) pool. As of July 23, 2023, he holds world records in two events (indicated with "Current"), after his last standing individual world record in the 400 m individual medley was broken.

=== Long course (50 m pool) ===
No.	Event	Time		Meet	Location	Date	Status	Ref.
1	200 m butterfly	1:54.92		2001 U.S. Spring National Championships	Austin, Texas, United States	March 30, 2001	Former	
2	200 m butterfly (2)	1:54.58		2001 World Championships	Fukuoka, Japan	July 24, 2001	Former	
3	400 m individual medley	4:11.09		2002 U.S. National Championships	Ft. Lauderdale, Florida, United States	August 15, 2002	Former	
4	4×100 m medley relay^{[a]}	3:33.48		2002 Pan Pacific Championships	Yokohama, Japan	August 29, 2002	Former	
5	400 m individual medley (2)	4:10.73		2003 Duel in the Pool	Indianapolis, Indiana, United States	April 6, 2003	Former	
6	200 m individual medley	1:57.94		2003 Santa Clara Invitational	Santa Clara, California, United States	June 29, 2003	Former	
7	200 m butterfly (3)	1:53.93	sf	2003 World Championships	Barcelona, Spain	July 22, 2003	Former	
8	200 m individual medley (2)	1:57.52	sf	2003 World Championships	Barcelona, Spain	July 24, 2003	Former	
9	100 m butterfly	51.47	sf	2003 World Championships	Barcelona, Spain	July 25, 2003	Former	
10	200 m individual medley (3)	1:56.04		2003 World Championships	Barcelona, Spain	July 25, 2003	Former	
11	400 m individual medley (3)	4:09.09		2003 World Championships	Barcelona, Spain	July 27, 2003	Former	
12	200 m individual medley (4)	1:55.94		2003 U.S. National Championships	College Park, Maryland, United States	August 9, 2003	Former	
13	400 m individual medley (4)	4:08.41		2004 U.S. Olympic Trials	Long Beach, California, United States	July 7, 2004	Former	
14	400 m individual medley (5)	4:08.26		2004 Summer Olympics	Athens, Greece	August 14, 2004	Former	
15	200 m butterfly (4)	1:53.80		2006 Pan Pacific Championships	Victoria, British Columbia, Canada	August 17, 2006	Former	
16	4×100 m freestyle relay^{[b]}	3:12.46		2006 Pan Pacific Championships	Victoria, British Columbia, Canada	August 19, 2006	Former	
17	200 m individual medley (5)	1:55.84		2006 Pan Pacific Championships	Victoria, British Columbia, Canada	August 20, 2006	Former	
18	200 m butterfly (5)	1:53.71		2007 Missouri Grand Prix	Columbia, Missouri, United States	February 17, 2007	Former	
19	200 m freestyle	1:43.86		2007 World Championships	Melbourne, Victoria, Australia	March 27, 2007	Former	
20	200 m butterfly (6)	1:52.09		2007 World Championships	Melbourne, Victoria, Australia	March 28, 2007	Former	
21	200 m individual medley (6)	1:54.98		2007 World Championships	Melbourne, Victoria, Australia	March 29, 2007	Former	
22	4×200 m freestyle relay^{[c]}	7:03.24		2007 World Championships	Melbourne, Victoria, Australia	March 30, 2007	Former	
23	400 m individual medley (6)	4:06.22		2007 World Championships	Melbourne, Victoria, Australia	April 1, 2007	Former	
24	400 m individual medley (7)	4:05.25		2008 U.S. Olympic Trials	Omaha, Nebraska, United States	June 29, 2008	Former	
25	200 m individual medley (7)	1:54.80		2008 U.S. Olympic Trials	Omaha, Nebraska, United States	July 4, 2008	Former	
26	400 m individual medley (8)	4:03.84		2008 Summer Olympics	Beijing, China	August 10, 2008	Former	
27	4×100 m freestyle relay (2)^{[d]}	3:08.24		2008 Summer Olympics	Beijing, China	August 11, 2008	Current	
28	200 m freestyle (2)	1:42.96		2008 Summer Olympics	Beijing, China	August 12, 2008	Former	
29	200 m butterfly (7)	1:52.03		2008 Summer Olympics	Beijing, China	August 13, 2008	Former	
30	4×200 m freestyle relay (2)^{[e]}	6:58.56		2008 Summer Olympics	Beijing, China	August 13, 2008	Former	
31	200 m individual medley (8)	1:54.23		2008 Summer Olympics	Beijing, China	August 15, 2008	Former	
32	4×100 m medley relay (2)^{[a]}	3:29.34		2008 Summer Olympics	Beijing, China	August 17, 2008	Former	
33	100 m butterfly (2)	50.22		2009 U.S. National Championships	Indianapolis, Indiana, United States	July 9, 2009	Former	
34	200 m butterfly (8)	1:51.51		2009 World Championships	Rome, Italy	July 29, 2009	Former	
35	4×200 m freestyle relay (3)^{[f]}	6:58.55		2009 World Championships	Rome, Italy	July 31, 2009	Current	
36	100 m butterfly (3)	49.82		2009 World Championships	Rome, Italy	August 1, 2009	Former	
37	4×100 m medley relay (3)^{[g]}	3:27.28		2009 World Championships	Rome, Italy	August 2, 2009	Former	

Legend: e – equalled existing record;
Records not set in finals: h – heat; sf – semifinal; r – relay 1st leg; rh – relay heat 1st leg; b – B final; † – en route to final mark; so – swim-off; tt – time trial

a. with Aaron Peirsol, Brendan Hansen and Jason Lezak
b. with Neil Walker, Cullen Jones and Jason Lezak
c. with Ryan Lochte, Klete Keller and Peter Vanderkaay
d. with Garrett Weber-Gale, Cullen Jones and Jason Lezak
e. with Ryan Lochte, Ricky Berens and Peter Vanderkaay
f. with Ryan Lochte, Ricky Berens and David Walters
g. with Aaron Peirsol, Eric Shanteau and David Walters

=== Short course (25 m pool) ===
No.	Event	Time	Meet	Location	Date	Status	Ref.
1	4×100 m medley relay^{[h]}	3:20.71	2009 Duel in the Pool	Manchester, United Kingdom	December 18, 2009	Former	
2	4×100 m freestyle relay^{[i]}	3:03.30	2009 Duel in the Pool	Manchester, United Kingdom	December 19, 2009	Former	

h. with Nick Thoman, Mark Gangloff and Nathan Adrian
i. with Nathan Adrian, Matt Grevers and Garrett Weber-Gale

=== Guinness World Records ===
Phelps holds 18 Guinness World Records which predominantly consist of accumulative Guinness World Records ("Guinness mosts", records formulated starting with "most") for total number of accomplishments and victories in swimming such as: most medals, consecutive number of medals, most medals within one tournament, most records in swimming etc.

1. Most world records set for swimming (male)
2. Most gold medals won at the Olympics (male)
3. Most Olympic medals won (male)
4. Most gold medals won at the Olympics in individual events (male)
5. Most individual Olympic medals (male)
6. Most medals won at the Olympics for swimming (male)
7. Most individual swimming Olympic gold medals
8. Most Olympic gold medals in team swimming
9. Most Olympic golds at one Games (male)
10. Most Olympic medals won (single games), men
11. Most swimming Olympic medals won, men (single games)
12. Most consecutive Olympic swimming gold medals in the same event (male)
13. Most silver medals awarded in a single Olympic swimming race
14. Most gold medals won at the FINA Swimming World Championships (male)
15. Most medals won at the FINA Swimming World Championships
16. Most Men's World Swimmer of the Year Awards
17. Fastest swim long course relay 4 × 100 metres freestyle (male)
18. Fastest swim long course relay 4 × 200 metres freestyle (male)

== Honors and awards ==
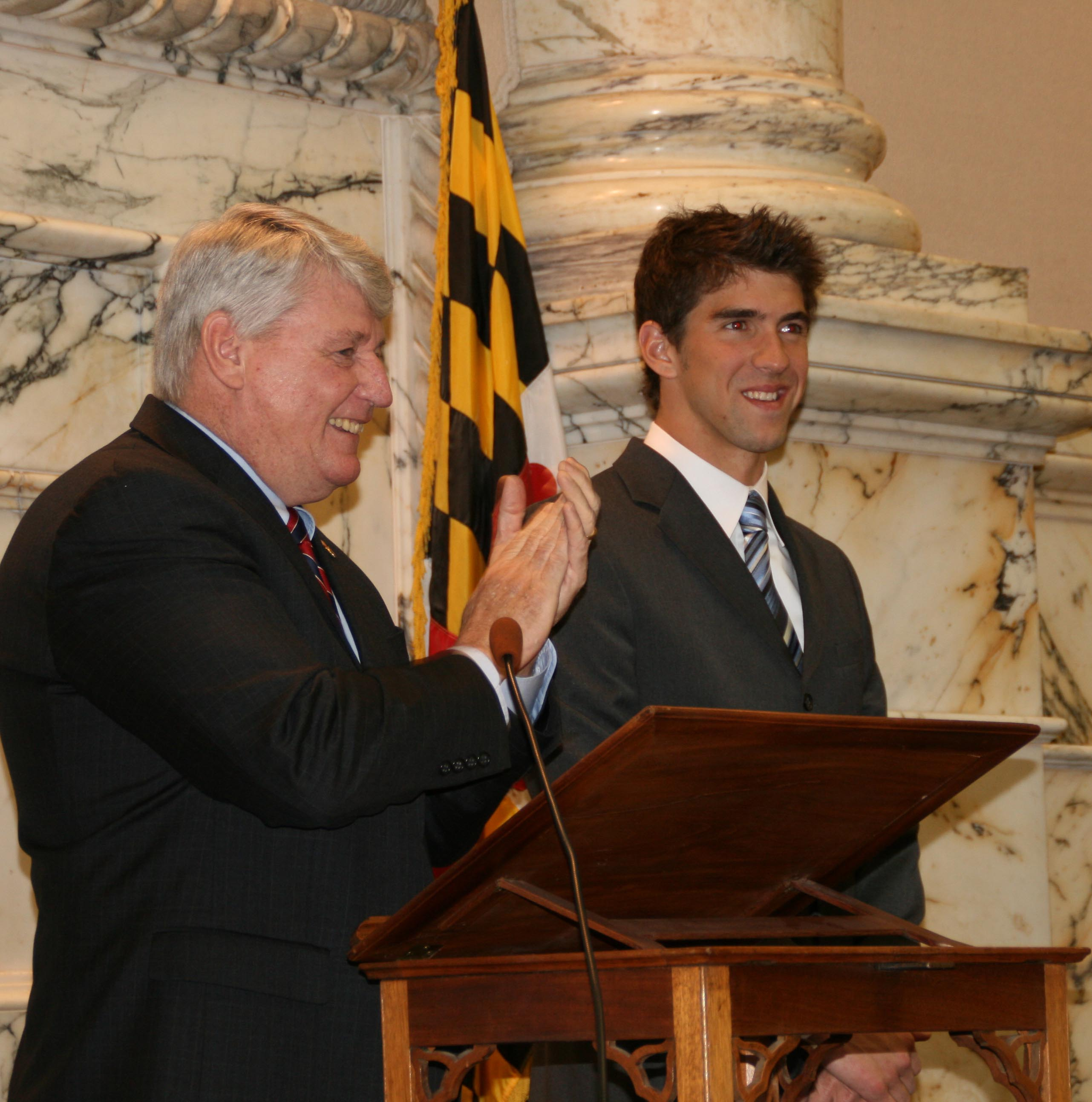
Phelps and Maryland House Speaker Mike Busch in April 2009. Both houses of the Maryland General Assembly honored Phelps that day.

Phelps was a USA Olympic team member in 2000, 2004, 2008, 2012 and 2016, and holds the records for most Olympic gold medals (23), most such medals in individual events (13), and most such medals at a single games (8, in Beijing 2008). A street in his hometown of Baltimore was renamed The Michael Phelps Way in 2004. On April 9, 2009, Phelps was invited to appear before the Maryland House of Delegates and the Maryland Senate, to be honored for his Olympic accomplishments.

Phelps has also received the following awards:

- Swimming World World Swimmer of the Year Award: 2003, 2004, 2006, 2007, 2008, 2009, 2012, 2016
- Swimming World American Swimmer of the Year Award: 2001, 2002, 2003, 2004, 2006, 2007, 2008, 2009, 2012, 2015, 2016
- Fédération internationale de natation swimmer of the year (since 2010): 2012, 2016
- Golden Goggle Male Performance of the Year (since 2004): 2004, 2006, 2007, 2008, 2009, 2016
- Golden Goggle Relay Performance of the Year (since 2004): 2006, 2007, 2008, 2009, 2016
- Golden Goggle Male Athlete of the Year (since 2004): 2004, 2007, 2008, 2012, 2014, 2015, 2016
- Golden Goggle Impact award: 2016
- SwimSwam Swammy Award for Male Swimmer of the Year: 2016
- USOC SportsMan of the Year Award: 2004, 2008, 2011–12, 2016
- James E. Sullivan Award: 2003
- Gazzetta dello Sport Sportsman of the Year: 2003, 2004
- Laureus World Sportsman of the Year Award (nominated): 2004, 2005, 2008, 2009, 2013
- Laureus World Comeback of the Year Award: 2017
- United States Sports Academy Male Athlete of the Year: 2003, 2008
- Sports Illustrated Sportsman of the Year: 2008
- Associated Press Athlete of the Year: 2008, 2012
- Marca Leyenda award: 2008
- Morton E. Ruderman Award in Inclusion, 2019, to recognize his advocacy for people with disabilities and his own journey with mental health.

== See also ==
- List of multiple Olympic gold medalists
- List of multiple Olympic gold medalists at a single Games
- List of multiple Olympic medalists
- List of multiple Summer Olympic medalists
- List of multiple Olympic medalists at a single Games
- List of multiple Olympic gold medalists in one event
- List of top Olympic gold medalists in swimming
- List of individual gold medalists in swimming at the Olympics and World Aquatics Championships (men)
- World record progression 100 metres butterfly
- World record progression 200 metres butterfly
- World record progression 200 metres freestyle
- World record progression 200 metres individual medley
- World record progression 400 metres individual medley
- World record progression 4 × 100 metres freestyle relay
- World record progression 4 × 200 metres freestyle relay
- World record progression 4 × 100 metres medley relay

Records
Preceded by Tom Malchow	Men's 200-meter butterfly world record holder (long course); March 30, 2001 – July 24, 2019	Succeeded by Kristóf Milák
Preceded by Tom Dolan	Men's 400-meter individual medley world record holder (long course); August 15, 2002 – July 23, 2023	Succeeded by Léon Marchand
Preceded by Jani Sievinen	Men's 200-meter individual medley world record holder (long course); June 29, 2003 – July 30, 2009	Succeeded by Ryan Lochte
Preceded by Andriy Serdinov; Ian Crocker; Milorad Čavić	Men's 100-meter butterfly world record holder (long course); July 25–26, 2003; July 9–31, 2009; August 1, 2009 – July 26, 2019	Succeeded by Ian Crocker; Milorad Čavić; Caeleb Dressel
Preceded by Ian Thorpe	Men's 200-meter freestyle world record holder (long course); March 27, 2007 – July 28, 2009	Succeeded by Paul Biedermann
Preceded by Paavo Nurmi; Larisa Latynina; Mark Spitz; Carl Lewis	Athletes with the most gold medals at Olympic Games; August 13, 2008 – present	Incumbent
Preceded by Larisa Latynina	Athletes with the most medals at Olympic Games; July 31, 2012 – present	Incumbent
Awards
Preceded by Ian Thorpe; Grant Hackett; Ryan Lochte; Adam Peaty	World Swimmer of the Year; 2003–2004; 2006–2009; 2012; 2016	Succeeded by Grant Hackett; Ryan Lochte; Sun Yang; Caeleb Dressel
Preceded by Michael Schumacher	La Gazzetta dello Sport; Sportsman of the Year; 2003, 2004	Succeeded by Roger Federer
Preceded by Ryan Lochte; Mitch Larkin	FINA Swimmer of the Year; 2012; 2016	Succeeded by Ryan Lochte; Caeleb Dressel
Preceded by Lenny Krayzelburg & Tom Dolan; Aaron Peirsol; Ryan Lochte; Ryan Cochrane & Tyler Clary	American Swimmer of the Year; 2001–2004 2006–2009; 2012; 2015–16	Succeeded by Aaron Peirsol Ryan Lochte; Ryan Lochte; Caeleb Dressel
Olympic Games
Preceded by Todd Lodwick	Flagbearer for United States; Rio de Janeiro 2016	Succeeded by Erin Hamlin
