= Shinya Taniguchi =

Japanese swimmer (1981–2013)

Personal information
- Full name: Shinya Taniguchi
- Nationality: Japan
- Born: 6 February 1979 Mie, Japan
- Died: 4 October 2013 (aged 34) Mie, Japan
- Height: 181 cm (5 ft 11 in)
- Weight: 71 kg (157 lb)

Sport
- Sport: Swimming
- Strokes: butterfly
Medal record
Men's swimming
Representing Japan
Asian Games
Bronze medal – third place	2002 Busan	400m medley

Shinya Taniguchi (谷口 晋矢, Taniguchi Shin'ya; 23 March 1981 – 4 September 2013) was a Japanese swimmer who competed in the 2000 Summer Olympics.

== Death ==
He died on 4 September 2013 from stomach cancer.
