= Lucas Salatta =

Brazilian swimmer (born 1987)

Personal information
- Full name: Lucas Vinícius Yokoo Salatta
- Nationality: Brazil
- Born: 27 April 1987 (age 39) São Paulo, São Paulo, Brazil
- Height: 1.76 m (5 ft 9 in)
- Weight: 75 kg (165 lb)

Sport
- Sport: Swimming
- Strokes: Medley
Medal record
Men's swimming
Representing Brazil
World Championships (SC)
Bronze medal – third place	2004 Indianapolis	4x200m free
Pan American Games
Gold medal – first place	2007 Rio de Janeiro	4x200m free
Silver medal – second place	2007 Rio de Janeiro	4x100m medley
Bronze medal – third place	2007 Rio de Janeiro	200m backstroke
South American Games
Gold medal – first place	2002 Belém	200 m medley
Gold medal – first place	2002 Belém	400 m medley
Gold medal – first place	2002 Belém	4x100 m free

Lucas Vinícius Yokoo Salatta (born 27 April 1987 in São Paulo) is a Brazilian backstroke swimmer.

At his 1998 state championship, Salatta set two age records in the 100m freestyle (1:04.50) and 100m butterfly (1:09.30) with only 11 years old.

He is nicknamed the "New Ricardo Prado", after breaking one of Prado's Brazilian Records in 2002.

At the 2002 South American Games, he won three gold medals in the 200-metre individual medley, 400-metre individual medley and 4 × 100 m freestyle.

Salatta was at the 2004 Summer Olympics in Athens, where he finished 19th place in the 400-metre individual medley.

At the 2004 FINA World Swimming Championships (25 m), headquartered in the city of Indianapolis, Salatta won the bronze medal in the 4×200-metre freestyle, beating the South American record, with a time of 7:06.64. He also got the 9th place in the 200-metre individual medley, was in the 400-metre individual medley final, finishing 6th, and was in the 200-metre backstroke final, finishing 8th.

Salatta was at the 2006 FINA World Swimming Championships (25 m) in Shanghai, where he finished 5th place in the 4×200-metre freestyle final beating South American record with a time of 7:06.09, along with César Cielo, Thiago Pereira and Rodrigo Castro. He was also ranked 12th in the 200-metre individual medley, went to the 400-metre individual medley final, finishing 8th, and ranked 13th in the 200-metre backstroke.

He was at the 2006 Pan Pacific Swimming Championships in Victoria, where he finished 6th in the 4×200-metre freestyle, 14th in the 200-metre individual medley, and 16th in the 200-metre freestyle.

He was gold medalist in the 4×200-metre freestyle, silver in the 4×100-metre medley relay (by having participated in heats) and bronze in the 200-metre backstroke in 2007 Pan American Games, in Rio de Janeiro. He also ranked 10th in the 200-metre butterfly.

Participating in the 2008 FINA World Swimming Championships (25 m), in Manchester, broke the South American record of 200-metre backstroke, at the heats of the race, with a time of 1:52.85. He qualified for the final, finishing in 8th place.

At the 2008 Summer Olympics in Beijing, he came in 16th place in the 4×200-metre freestyle, and in 23rd place in 200-metre backstroke.

Salatta was at the 2009 World Aquatics Championships in Rome, and with Thiago Pereira, Rodrigo Castro and Nicolas Oliveira got the 10th place in the 4×200-metre freestyle, beating the South American record with a time of 7:09.71. He was also in the semifinals of the 200-metre butterfly, finishing in 16th place.

He was at the 2010 Pan Pacific Swimming Championships in Irvine, where he finished 20th in the 200-metre butterfly, and 22nd in the 200-metre individual medley.

At the 2011 Military World Games, conducted in Rio de Janeiro, Salatta won the silver in the 200-metre individual medley, and bronze in the 400-metre individual medley.

At the 2014 FINA World Swimming Championships (25 m) in Doha, Qatar, Salatta finished 10th in the Men's 200 metre butterfly, and 21st in the Men's 100 metre backstroke.

== See also ==
- Pan American Games records in swimming
- List of South American records in swimming
- List of Brazilian records in swimming
