= Swimming at the 2011 Pan American Games – Men's 200 metre butterfly =

Men's 200 metre butterfly at the 2011 Pan American Games
- Venue: Scotiabank Aquatics Center
- Dates: October 17 (preliminaries and finals)

Medalists
Gold medal	Leonardo de Deus	Brazil
Silver medal	Daniel Madwed	United States
Bronze medal	Kaio de Almeida	Brazil

The men's 200 metre butterfly competition of the swimming events at the 2011 Pan American Games took place on October 17 at the Scotiabank Aquatics Center in Mexico. The defending Pan American Games champion was Kaio de Almeida of Brazil.

This race consisted of four lengths of the pool, all being in butterfly stroke.

== Records ==
Prior to this competition, the existing world and Pan American Games records were as follows:

World record	Michael Phelps (USA)	1:51.51	Rome, Italy	July 29, 2009
Pan American Games record	Kaio de Almeida (BRA)	1:55.45	Rio de Janeiro, Brazil	July 21, 2007

== Qualification ==
Each National Olympic Committee (NOC) was able to enter up to two entrants providing they had met the A standard (2:02.0) in the qualifying period (January 1, 2010 to September 4, 2011). NOCs were also permitted to enter one athlete providing they had met the B standard (2:05.7) in the same qualifying period.

== Results ==
All times are in minutes and seconds.

KEY:	q	Fastest non-qualifiers	Q	Qualified	NR	National record	PB	Personal best	SB	Seasonal best

=== Heats ===
The first round was held on October 17.

Rank	Heat	Lane	Name	Nationality	Time	Notes
1	2	5	Daniel Madwed	United States	1:59.99	QA
2	2	4	Kaio de Almeida	Brazil	2:00.32	QA
3	1	4	Leonardo de Deus	Brazil	2:00.99	QA
4	1	5	Omar Pinzón	Colombia	2:01.02	QA
5	1	3	Israel Duran	Mexico	2:01.27	QA
6	2	6	Marcos Lavado	Venezuela	2:01.33	QA
7	2	3	Robert Margalis Jr.	United States	2:01.62	QA
8	1	7	Mauricio Fiol	Peru	2:01.91	QA
9	2	7	Ramiro Ramirez	Mexico	2:02.45	QB
10	2	2	Alexis Marquez	Venezuela	2:02.58	QB
11	1	6	Diego Castillo	Panama	2:03.44	QB
12	1	2	Andres Gonzalez	Argentina	2:05.29	QB
13	1	1	Lazaro Vergara	Cuba	2:06.24	QB
14	2	1	Joel Romeu	Uruguay	2:07.87	QB
15	1	8	Victor Lopez-Cantera	Nicaragua	2:10.22	QB
	2	8	Shaune Fraser	Cayman Islands	DNS	

=== B Final ===
The B final was also held on October 17.

Rank	Lane	Name	Nationality	Time	Notes
9	4	Ramiro Ramirez	Mexico	2:02.93	
10	5	Alexis Marquez	Venezuela	2:02.99	
11	3	Diego Castillo	Panama	2:03.32	
12	6	Andres Gonzalez	Argentina	2:04.99	
13	7	Joel Romeu	Uruguay	2:06.30	
14	2	Lazaro Vergara	Cuba	2:06.95	
15	1	Victor Lopez-Cantera	Nicaragua	2:09.19	

=== A Final ===
The A final was also held on October 17.

Rank	Lane	Name	Nationality	Time	Notes
1st place, gold medalist(s)	3	Leonardo de Deus	Brazil	1:57.92	
2nd place, silver medalist(s)	4	Daniel Madwed	United States	1:58.52	
3rd place, bronze medalist(s)	5	Kaio de Almeida	Brazil	1:58.78	
4	6	Omar Pinzón	Colombia	2:01.36	
5	7	Marcos Lavado	Venezuela	2:01.62	
6	1	Robert Margalis Jr.	United States	2:01.95	
7	2	Israel Duran	Mexico	2:02.45	
8	8	Mauricio Fiol	Peru	2:03.36	
