= Swimming at the 2014 South American Games – Men's 400 metre individual medley =

Men's 400 metre individual medley at the 2014 South American Games
- Venue: Estadio Nacional
- Dates: March 10, 2014 (heats & finals)
- Competitors: 8 from 6 nations
- Winning time: 4:23.15

Medalists
gold medal	Thiago Pereira	Brazil
silver medal	Esteban Enderica	Ecuador
bronze medal	Thiago Simon	Brazil

The men's 400 metre individual medley competition at the 2014 South American Games took place on March 10 at the Estadio Nacional. The last champion was Thiago Pereira of Brazil.

This race consisted of eight lengths of the pool. The first two lengths were swum using the butterfly stroke, the second pair with the backstroke, the third pair of lengths in breaststroke, and the final two were freestyle.

== Records ==
Prior to this competition, the existing world and Pan Pacific records were as follows:

World record	Michael Phelps (USA)	4:03.84	Beijing, China	August 10, 2008
South American Games record	Thiago Pereira (BRA)	4:28.79	Medellín, Colombia	March 29, 2010

== Results ==
All times are in minutes and seconds.

KEY:	q	Fastest non-qualifiers	Q	Qualified	CR	Championships record	NR	National record	PB	Personal best	SB	Seasonal best

=== Heats ===
Heats weren't performed, as only eight swimmers had entered.

=== Final ===
The final was held on March 10, at 21:05.

Rank	Lane	Name	Nationality	Time	Notes
1st place, gold medalist(s)	4	Thiago Pereira	Brazil	4:23.15	CR
2nd place, silver medalist(s)	3	Esteban Enderica	Ecuador	4:25.30	
3rd place, bronze medalist(s)	5	Thiago Simon	Brazil	4:27.86	
4	6	Matias López Chaparro	Paraguay	4:32.58	NR
5	7	David Céspedes	Colombia	4:40.37	
6	1	Felipe Quiroz Uteau	Chile	4:40.72	
7	8	Joaquin Sepulveda Parra	Chile	4:52.14	
-	2	Andy Arteta Gomez	Venezuela	DSQ	
