= Swimming at the 2010 South American Games – Men's 200 metre individual medley =

The Men's 200m individual medley event at the 2010 South American Games was held on March 28, with the heats at 11:06 and the Final at 18:20.

== Medalists ==
| Gold | Silver | Bronze |
|---|---|---|
| Thiago Pereira; Brazil | Leopoldo Andara; Venezuela | Diego Bonilla; Colombia |

== Records ==
Standing records prior to the 2010 South American Games
| World record | Ryan Lochte (USA) | 1:54.10 | Rome, Italy | 30 July 2009 |
| Competition Record | Joaquin Belza (ARG) | 2:05.85 | Buenos Aires, Argentina | 17 November 2006 |
| South American record | Thiago Pereira (BRA) | 1:55.55 | Rome, Italy | 30 July 2009 |

== Results ==
=== Heats ===
| Rank | Heat | Lane | Athlete | Result | Notes |
|---|---|---|---|---|---|
| 1 | 3 | 4 | Thiago Pereira (BRA) | 2:09.28 | Q |
| 2 | 1 | 4 | Leopoldo Andara (VEN) | 2:09.95 | Q |
| 3 | 1 | 5 | Cristhian Orjuela (COL) | 2:10.07 | Q |
| 4 | 2 | 3 | Diego Bonilla (COL) | 2:10.51 | Q |
| 5 | 2 | 4 | Sebastián Jahnsen Madico (PER) | 2:10.90 | Q |
| 6 | 2 | 6 | Luis Rojas Martinez (VEN) | 2:11.45 | Q |
| 7 | 2 | 5 | Gaston Rodriguez (ARG) | 2:11.69 | Q |
| 8 | 3 | 3 | Benjamin Guzman Blanco (CHI) | 2:12.11 | Q |
| 9 | 3 | 6 | Diego Castillo (PAN) | 2:13.01 | |
| 10 | 1 | 6 | Carlos Enrique Carvajal (ECU) | 2:13.65 | |
| 11 | 1 | 3 | Juan Lisandro Monzon (ARG) | 2:17.85 | |
| 12 | 3 | 5 | Leonardo de Deus (BRA) | 2:18.11 | |
| 13 | 2 | 2 | Diguan Pigot (SUR) | 2:18.87 | |
| 14 | 3 | 2 | Victor de la Rosa Garcia (PER) | 2:19.39 | |
| 15 | 2 | 7 | Jordy Groters (ARU) | 2:21.91 | |
| 16 | 1 | 7 | Hugo Andres Pastore (PAR) | 2:24.07 | |
| 17 | 3 | 7 | Carlos Alfredo Gianotti (PAR) | 2:25.69 | |
| 18 | 3 | 1 | Armando Esteban Claure (BOL) | 2:31.60 | |
| | 1 | 2 | Jair Boerenveen (SUR) | DNS | |

=== Final ===
| Rank | Lane | Athlete | Result | Notes |
|---|---|---|---|---|
| 1st place, gold medalist(s) | 4 | Thiago Pereira (BRA) | 2:03.16 | |
| 2nd place, silver medalist(s) | 5 | Leopoldo Andara (VEN) | 2:08.27 | |
| 3rd place, bronze medalist(s) | 6 | Diego Bonilla (COL) | 2:08.61 | |
| 4 | 3 | Cristhian Orjuela (COL) | 2:09.77 | |
| 5 | 2 | Sebastián Jahnsen Madico (PER) | 2:09.83 | |
| 6 | 1 | Benjamin Guzman Blanco (CHI) | 2:11.57 | |
| 7 | 7 | Gaston Rodriguez (ARG) | 2:11.67 | |
| 8 | 8 | Diego Castillo (PAN) | 2:12.36 | |
