= Swimming at the 2011 Pan American Games – Men's 4 × 200 metre freestyle relay =

Men's 4 × 200 metre freestyle relay at the 2011 Pan American Games
- Venue: Scotiabank Aquatics Center
- Dates: October 19 (preliminaries and finals)

Medalists
Gold medal	Conor Dwyer; Douglas Robison; Charlie Houchin; Matthew Patton; Daniel Madwed; Ryan Feeley; Rexford Tullius; Robert Margalis	United States
Silver medal	Andre Schultz; Nicolas Oliveira; Leonardo de Deus; Thiago Pereira; Giuliano Rocco; Lucas Kanieski; Diogo Yabe	Brazil
Bronze medal	Daniele Tirabassi; Cristian Quintero; Crox Acuña; Marcos Lavado; Ricardo Monasterio; Alejandro Gómez	Venezuela

The men's 4 × 200 metre freestyle relay competition of the swimming events at the 2011 Pan American Games took place on 19 October at the Scotiabank Aquatics Center. The defending Pan American Games champion is the team from Brazil (Thiago Pereira, Rodrigo Castro, Nicolas Oliveira and Lucas Salatta).

This race consisted of sixteen lengths of the pool. Each of the four swimmers completed four lengths of the pool. The first swimmer had to touch the wall before the second could leave the starting block.

== Records ==
Prior to this competition, the existing world and Pan American Games records were as follows:

World record	United States (USA); Michael Phelps (1:44.49); Ricky Berens (1:44.13); David Walters (1:45.47); Ryan Lochte (1:44.46)	6:58.55	Rome, Italy	July 31, 2009
Pan American Games record	Brazil (BRA); Thiago Pereira (1:48.63); Rodrigo Castro (1:49.38); Lucas Salatta (1:47.63); Nicolas Oliveira (1:46.63)	7:12.27	Rio de Janeiro, Brazil	July 17, 2007

== Results ==
All times shown are in minutes.

KEY:	Q	Qualified	GR	Games record	NR	National record	PB	Personal best	SB	Seasonal best	PR	Pan American Games record

=== Heats ===
The first round was held on October 19. As only eight teams had entered, the heats served as a ranking round with all eight teams advancing to the final.

Rank	Lane	Name	Nationality	Time	Notes
1	4	Daniel Madwed (1:51.76); Ryan Feeley (1:50.90); Rexford Tullius (1:52.33); Robert Margalis (1:52.10)	United States	7:27.09	Q
2	5	Giuliano Rocco (1:53.83); Lucas Kanieski (1:54.55); Diogo Yabe (1:53.61); Leonardo de Deus (1:55.90)	Brazil	7:37.89	Q
3	2	Fernando González (1:54.75); Gerardo Bañuelos (1:54.20); Daniel Delgadillo (1:55.17); Gustavo Berretta (1:54.62)	Mexico	7:38.74	Q
4	3	Crox Acuña (1:53.09); Eddy Marin (1:55.36); Ricardo Monasterio (1:55.16); Alejandro Gómez (1:56.03)	Venezuela	7:39.64	Q
5	1	Mauricio Fiol (1:52.89); Jesus Monge (1:59.02); Sebastian Jahnsen (1:55.36); Gerardo Huidobro (2:03.81)	Peru	7:51.08	Q
6	8	Frederico Grabich (1:58.24); Esteban Paz (1:57.75); Martín Naidich (1:59.04); Juan Pereyra (1:59.24)	Argentina	7:54.27	Q
7	7	Francis Despond (1:54.12); Ashton Baumann (2:00.59); Jacob Armstrong (2:03.38); Warren Barnes (2:08.00)	Canada	8:06.09	Q
8	6	Genaro Prono (2:04.27); Renato Prono (2:08.05); Jose Lobo (2:02.00); Charles Hockin (1:58.71)	Paraguay	8:13.03	Q

=== Final ===
The final was held on October 19.

Rank	Lane	Name	Nationality	Time	Notes
1st place, gold medalist(s)	4	Conor Dwyer (1:47.62); Douglas Robison (1:49.12); Charlie Houchin (1:48.64); Matthew Patton (1:49.69)	United States	7:15.07	
2nd place, silver medalist(s)	5	Andre Schultz (1:50.55); Nicolas Oliveira (1:50.14); Leonardo de Deus (1:52.16); Thiago Pereira (1:49.11)	Brazil	7:21.96	
3rd place, bronze medalist(s)	6	Daniele Tirabassi (1:50.97); Cristian Quintero (1:49.26); Crox Acuña (1:51.41); Marcos Lavado (1:51.77)	Venezuela	7:23.41	
4	7	Juan Pereyra (1:56.43); Martin Naidich (1:52.75); Esteban Paz (1:54.12); Federico Grabich (1:53.07)	Argentina	7:36.37	
5	3	Gerardo Bañuelos (1:54.57); Fernando Gonzalez (1:55.49); Arturo Perez Vertti (1:53.68); Gustavo Berretta (1:54.03)	Mexico	7:37.77	
6	1	Francis Despond (1:55.34); Rory Biskupski (1:55.52); Lyam Dias (2:01.82); Ashton Baumann (1:58.17)	Canada	7:50.85	
7	8	Charles Hockin (1:56.61); Renato Prono (2:00.60); Jose Lobo (1:59.21); Benjamin Hockin (1:58.36)	Paraguay	7:54.78	
—	2	Jesus Monge (1:59.29); Mauricio Fiol (2:03.24); Sebastian Jahnsen (2:02.22); Gerardo Huidobro	Peru	DSQ	
