= List of United States Virgin Islands records in swimming =

The United States Virgin Islands Records in Swimming are the fastest times ever swam by a swimmer representing U.S. Virgin Islands. These records are kept/maintained by the Virgin Islands Swimming Federation (VISF). Records are recognized for long course (50m) and short course (25m) swims, in the following events:

- Freestyle: 50, 100, 200, 400, 800 and 1500;
- Backstroke: 50, 100 and 200;
- Breaststroke: 50, 100 and 200;
- Butterfly: 50, 100 and 200;
- Individual medley: 100 (short course only), 200 and 400;
- Relay (long course only): 200 & 400 Free and Medley.

== Long course (50m) ==
=== Men ===
Event	Time		Name	Club	Date	Meet	Location	Ref
50 m freestyle	23.12		Josh Laban	unattached	June 19, 2008	FGC A Invitational	Coral Springs, United States	
100 m freestyle	51.27	h	Branden Whitehurst	(United States Virgin Islands) Virgin Islands	July 29, 2009	World Championships	Rome, Italy	
200 m freestyle	1:51.59	h	Branden Whitehurst	(United States Virgin Islands) Virgin Islands	July 27, 2009	World Championships	Rome, Italy	
400 m freestyle	4:01.00		Scott Newkirk		August 1980			
800 m freestyle	8:18.80		Scott Newkirk		August 1980			
1500 m freestyle	16:08.36		Scott Newkirk	(United States Virgin Islands) Virgin Islands	July 7, 1979	Pan Am Games	San Juan, Puerto Rico	
50 m backstroke	25.54		Maximilian Wilson	US Virgin Islands	18 June 2024	CCCAN Championships	Monterrey, Mexico	
100 m backstroke	54.31		Maximilian Wilson	US Virgin Islands	12 August 2025	Junior Pan American Games	Asunción, Paraguay	
200 m backstroke	1:59.14	h	Rexford Tullius	US Virgin Islands	10 August 2016	Olympic Games	Rio de Janeiro, Brazil	
50m breaststroke	28.31		Adriel Sanes	US Virgin Islands	29 April 2021	UANA Tokyo Qualifier	Clermont, United States	
100m breaststroke	1:02.41	h	Adriel Sanes	US Virgin Islands	30 April 2021	UANA Tokyo Qualifier	Clermont, United States	
200m breaststroke	2:14.45		Adriel Sanes	US Virgin Islands	1 May 2021	UANA Tokyo Qualifier	Clermont, United States	
50m butterfly	25.37		Adriel Sanes	US Virgin Islands	29 June 2017	CCCAN	Port of Spain, Trinidad and Tobago	
100m butterfly	55.46	h	Branden Whitehurst	(United States Virgin Islands) Virgin Islands	July 31, 2009	World Championships	Rome, Italy	
200m butterfly	2:03.47	h	Matthew Mays	US Virgin Islands	23 July 2019	World Championships	Gwangju, South Korea	
200m individual medley	2:06.05	h	Branden Whitehurst	(United States Virgin Islands) Virgin Islands	July 29, 2009	World Championships	Rome, Italy	
400m individual medley	4:39.89		Maximilian Wilson	US Virgin Islands	17 April 2022	CARIFTA Championships	Bridgetown, Barbados	
4×50m freestyle relay	1:38.89		Maximilian Wilson (23.98); Kaeden Gleason; Jaidan Camacho; Michael Dizon-Bumann	US Virgin Islands	19 April 2022	CARIFTA Championships	Bridgetown, Barbados	
4×100m freestyle relay	3:30.70		Josh Laban; George Gleason; Kieran Locke; Morgan Locke	(United States Virgin Islands) Virgin Islands	August 12, 2003	Pan Am Games	Santo Domingo, Dominican Republic	
4×200m freestyle relay	7:51.71		Kieran Locke; Branden Whitehurst; Morgan Locke; Ryan Nelthropp	(United States Virgin Islands) Virgin Islands	July 17, 2007	Pan Am Games	Rio de Janeiro, Brazil	
4×50m medley relay	1:54.05		Kieran Locke; Kevin Hensley; Morgan Locke; N Colabella	(United States Virgin Islands) Virgin Islands	April 13, 2002	CARIFTA Championships	Bridgetown, Barbados	
4×100m medley relay	3:55.00		George Gleason; Kevin Hensley; S Hensley; Josh Laban	(United States Virgin Islands) Virgin Islands	August 17, 2003	Pan Am Games	Santo Domingo, Dominican Republic	

Legend: # – Record awaiting ratification by Virgin Islands Swimming Federation; WR – World record; AM – Americas record;
Records not set in finals: h – heat; sf – semifinal; r – relay 1st leg; rh – relay heat 1st leg; b – B final; † – en route to final mark; so – swim-off; tt – time trial

=== Women ===
Event	Time		Name	Club	Date	Meet	Location	Ref
50m freestyle	26.31	b	Reagan Uszenski	US Virgin Islands	28 July 2026	CAC Games	Santo Domingo, Dominican Republic	
100m freestyle	57.46	b	Reagan Uszenski	US Virgin Islands	29 July 2026	CAC Games	Santo Domingo, Dominican Republic	
200m freestyle	2:05.26	b	Audrey Moore	unattached	26 July 2021	US Swimming Futures Championships	Santa Clarita, United States	
400m freestyle	4:39.42	h	Natalia Kuipers	US Virgin Islands	25 July 2021	Olympic Games	Tokyo, Japan	
400m freestyle	4:29.94	h, #	Natalia Kuipers	US Virgin Islands	22 June 2024	Spanish Olympic Trials	Gran Canaria, Spain	
800m freestyle	9:29.10	h	Audrey Moore		July 12, 2019	LA Invite	Los Angeles, United States	
1500m freestyle	19:26.80		Shelly Cramer		August 1980	-		
1500m freestyle	18:16.30	'#'	Natalia Kuipers	US Virgin Islands	11 July 2022	CCCAN Championships	Bridgetown, Barbados	
50m backstroke	29.90	b	Reagan Uszenski	US Virgin Islands	30 July 2026	CAC Games	Santo Domingo, Dominican Republic	
100m backstroke	1:07.19	h	Caylee Watson	US Virgin Islands	7 August 2016	Olympic Games	Rio de Janeiro, Brazil	
200m backstroke	2:32.27		Caylee Watson	-	2014			
50m breaststroke	35.49		Brigitte Rasmussen	(United States Virgin Islands) Virgin Islands	March 12, 2011	FPN Cup 2011 #2	Ponce, Puerto Rico	
100m breaststroke	1:17.87		Brigitte Rasmussen	(United States Virgin Islands) Virgin Islands	April 26, 2011	CARIFTA	Wildey, Barbados	
200m breaststroke	2:49.51		Jamie Shufflebarger	(United States Virgin Islands) Virgin Islands	April 13, 2002	CARIFTA	Bridgetown, Barbados	
50m butterfly	28.49	b	Reagan Uszenski	US Virgin Islands	1 August 2026	CAC Games	Santo Domingo, Dominican Republic	
100m butterfly	1:03.51		Shelly Cramer	(United States Virgin Islands) Virgin Islands	July 5, 1979	Pan Am Games	San Juan, Puerto Rico	
200m butterfly	2:17.88		Shelly Cramer	(United States Virgin Islands) Virgin Islands	July 7, 1979	Pan Am Games	San Juan, Puerto Rico	
200m individual medley	2:24.94		Reagan Uszenski	US Virgin Islands	28 July 2026	CAC Games	Santo Domingo, Dominican Republic	
400m individual medley	5:09.68		Jodie Lawaetz		August 1982			
4×50m freestyle relay	1:58.93		Lindsay Barr (29.34); Victoria Sperber; Veronica Leinenbach; Gabriela Brunt	US Virgin Islands	19 April 2022	CARIFTA Championships	Bridgetown, Barbados	
4×100m freestyle relay	4:14.95		A Allaire; Jamie Shufflebarger; K Whitehurst; S Ridgway	(United States Virgin Islands) Virgin Islands	July 2002	CISCs	Willemstad, Netherlands Antilles	
4×200m freestyle relay	9:37.89			-	2017			
4×50m medley relay	2:17.41		T Duncan; L Hamilton; R Hopesdale; D Sun		March 1988			
4×100m medley relay	4:48.83		A Allaire; K Whitehurst; Jamie Shufflebarger; S Ridgway	(United States Virgin Islands) Virgin Islands	July 2002	CISCs	Willemstad, Netherlands Antilles	

Legend: # – Record awaiting ratification by Virgin Islands Swimming Federation; WR – World record; AM – Americas record;
Records not set in finals: h – heat; sf – semifinal; r – relay 1st leg; rh – relay heat 1st leg; b – B final; † – en route to final mark; so – swim-off; tt – time trial

=== Mixed relay ===
Event	Time	Name	Nationality	Date	Meet	Location	Ref
4 × 100 m freestyle relay							
4 × 100 m medley relay	4:13.02	Adriel Sanes (56.15); Maximilian Wilson (1:04.90); Natalia Kuipers (1:08.66); Riley Miller (1:03.31)	U.S. Virgin Islands	24 June 2023	CAC Games	San Salvador, El Salvador	

Legend: # – Record awaiting ratification by Virgin Islands Swimming Federation;
Records not set in finals: h – heat; so – swim-off

== Short course (25m) ==
=== Men ===
Event	Time		Name	Club	Date	Meet	Location	Ref
50m freestyle	22.22		Josh Laban	Univ. of Georgia	March 25, 2004	NCAA Championships	East Meadow, United States	
100m freestyle	50.54	=	Josh Laban	Univ. of Georgia	December 5, 2003	Georgia Fall Invitational	Athens, United States	
100m freestyle	50.54	=	Maximilian Wilson	US Virgin Islands	29 October 2021	Puerto Rico International Open	Puerto Rico	
200m free	1:47.69	p	George Gleason	US Virgin Islands	April 3, 2002	Short Course Worlds	Moscow, Russia	
400m free	4:05.28		Kieran Locke	Univ. of Bath	November 19, 2006	BUCS 25m Champs.	Sheffield, United Kingdom	
1500m free	17:36.37		Adrian Smith	Marlins	February 1, 1999			
50m backstroke	23.81	h	Maximilian Wilson	US Virgin Islands	12 December 2024	World Championships	Budapest, Hungary	
100m backstroke	51.37	h	Maximilian Wilson	US Virgin Islands	10 December 2024	World Championships	Budapest, Hungary	
200m backstroke	1:58.99	h	Matthew Mays	US Virgin Islands	December 16, 2018	World Championships	Hangzhou, China	
50m breaststroke	28.25	h, †	Adriel Sanes	US Virgin Islands	16 December 2021	World Championships	Abu Dhabi, United Arab Emirates	
100m breaststroke	1:00.59	h	Adriel Sanes	US Virgin Islands	16 December 2021	World Championships	Abu Dhabi, United Arab Emirates	
200m breaststroke	2:12.71	h	Adriel Sanes	US Virgin Islands	18 December 2021	World Championships	Abu Dhabi, United Arab Emirates	
50m fly	26.79	p	Scott Hensley	US Virgin Islands	October 9, 2004	Short Course Worlds	Indianapolis, United States	
100m fly	55.60		Josh Laban	Univ. of Georgia	December 5, 2003	Georgia Fall Invitational	Athens, United States	
200m fly	2:12.28		Bryson Mays	St. Croix S.A.	December 11, 2010	VISF 25m Champs.	Red Hook, U.S. Virgin Islands	
100m individual medley	54.53	h	Rexford Tullius	United States Virgin Islands	December 6, 2014	World Championships	Doha, Qatar	
200m individual medley	2:02.29	p	George Gleason	United States Virgin Islands	April 5, 2002	Short Course Worlds	Moscow, Russia	
400m individual medley	4:42.83		Bryson Mays	St. Croix S.A.	December 11, 2010	VISF 25m Champs.	Red Hook, U.S. Virgin Islands	

Legend: # – Record awaiting ratification by Virgin Islands Swimming Federation; WR – World record; AM – Americas record;
Records not set in finals: h – heat; sf – semifinal; r – relay 1st leg; rh – relay heat 1st leg; b – B final; † – en route to final mark; so – swim-off; tt – time trial

=== Women ===
Event	Time		Name	Club	Date	Meet	Location	Ref
50m freestyle	27.14	h	Riley Miller	US Virgin Islands	14 December 2024	World Championships	Budapest, Hungary	
100m freestyle	58.87	h	Riley Miller	US Virgin Islands	11 December 2024	World Championships	Budapest, Hungary	
200m freestyle	2:13.65	h, †	Natalia Kuipers	US Virgin Islands	December 14, 2018	World Championships	Hangzhou, China	
400m freestyle	4:35.11	h	Natalia Kuipers	US Virgin Islands	December 14, 2018	World Championships	Hangzhou, China	
800m freestyle	9:46.97		Nicole Hutchins	Marlins	December 6, 2003	Puerto Rican Championships	Puerto Rico	
1500m freestyle								
50m backstroke	28.92	h	Caylee Watson	US Virgin Islands	9 December 2016	World Championships	Windsor, Canada	
100m backstroke	1:02.22	h	Caylee Watson	St. Croix S.A.	December 3, 2014	World Championships	Doha, Qatar	
200m backstroke	2:31.33		Caylee Watson	St. Croix S.A.	October 16, 2010	Beeston Hill	Beeston Hill, U.S. Virgin Islands	
50m breaststroke	34.91	p	Tina Woodward	US Virgin Islands	October 7, 2004	Short Course Worlds	Indianapolis, United States	
100m breaststroke	1:16.24	p	Tina Woodward	US Virgin Islands	October 9, 2004	Short Course Worlds	Indianapolis, United States	
200m breaststroke	2:45.82	p	Tina Woodward	US Virgin Islands	October 11, 2004	Short Course Worlds	Indianapolis, United States	
50m butterfly	28.44	h	Caylee Watson	US Virgin Islands	8 December 2016	World Championships	Windsor, Canada	
100m butterfly	1:02.48	h	Caylee Watson	St. Croix S.A.	December 6, 2014	World Championships	Doha, Qatar	
200m butterfly	2:29.24	h	Natalia Kuipers	US Virgin Islands	12 December 2018	World Championships	Hangzhou, China	
100m individual medley	1:10.05	p	Tina Woodward	US Virgin Islands	October 8, 2004	World Championships	Indianapolis, United States	
200m individual medley	2:33.56		Keri Whitehurst	Marlins	November 22, 2003	November meet	U.S. Virgin Islands	
400m individual medley	5:28.30		Jamie Shufflebarger	St. Croix S.A.	December 13, 2003	VISF 25m Champs.	U.S. Virgin Islands	

Legend: # – Record awaiting ratification by Virgin Islands Swimming Federation; WR – World record; AM – Americas record;
Records not set in finals: h – heat; sf – semifinal; r – relay 1st leg; rh – relay heat 1st leg; b – B final; † – en route to final mark; so – swim-off; tt – time trial
