= Swimming at the 2010 South American Games – Men's 200 metre butterfly =

The Men's 200m butterfly event at the 2010 South American Games was held on March 27, with the heats at 10:26 and the Final at 18:05.

== Medalists ==
Gold	Silver	Bronze
Leonardo de Deus; Brazil	Andres Montoya; Colombia	Andres Jose Gonzalez; Argentina

== Records ==
Standing records prior to the 2010 South American Games
World record	Michael Phelps (USA)	1:51.51	Rome, Italy	29 July 2009
Competition Record	Gaston Rodriguez (ARG)	2:03.04	Buenos Aires, Argentina	17 November 2006
South American record	Kaio Márcio de Almeida (BRA)	1:53.92	Rio de Janeiro, Brazil	8 May 2009

== Results ==
=== Heats ===
Rank	Heat	Lane	Athlete	Result	Notes
1	2	4	Leonardo de Deus (BRA)	2:04.51	Q
2	2	3	Andres Montoya (COL)	2:04.57	Q
3	1	3	Joel Romeu (URU)	2:05.75	Q
4	1	5	Jose Barrantes (PER)	2:05.92	Q
5	2	6	Diego Castillo (PAN)	2:06.13	Q
6	1	4	Andres Jose Gonzalez (ARG)	2:07.24	Q
7	1	6	Mauricio Fiol (PER)	2:08.02	Q
8	2	2	Cristhian Orjuela (COL)	2:08.33	Q
9	2	5	Marcos Barale (ARG)	2:08.80	
10	2	7	Carlos Alfredo Gianotti (PAR)	2:14.92	
11	1	7	Alejandro Madde (BOL)	2:15.91	
12	1	2	Ivan Marcelo Zavala (ECU)	2:17.83	
	2	1	Kaio de Almeida (BRA)	DNS	

=== Final ===
Rank	Lane	Athlete	Result	Notes
1st place, gold medalist(s)	4	Leonardo de Deus (BRA)	2:01.20	CR
2nd place, silver medalist(s)	5	Andres Montoya (COL)	2:03.88	
3rd place, bronze medalist(s)	7	Andres Jose Gonzalez (ARG)	2:04.45	
4	2	Diego Castillo (PAN)	2:05.53	
5	3	Joel Romeu (URU)	2:05.79	
6	6	Jose Barrantes (PER)	2:05.83	
7	1	Mauricio Fiol (PER)	2:07.69	
8	8	Cristhian Orjuela (COL)	2:07.90	
