= Swimming at the 2011 Pan American Games – Men's 200 metre individual medley =

Men's 200 metre individual medley at the 2011 Pan American Games
- Venue: Scotiabank Aquatics Center
- Dates: October 19 (preliminaries and finals)
- Competitors: 15 from 12 nations

Medalists
Gold medal	Thiago Pereira	Brazil
Silver medal	Conor Dwyer	United States
Bronze medal	Henrique Rodrigues	Brazil

The men's 200 metre individual medley competition of the swimming events at the 2011 Pan American Games took place on October 19 at the Scotiabank Aquatics Center in the municipality of Zapopan, near Guadalajara, Mexico. The defending Pan American Games champion was Thiago Pereira of Brazil.

This race consisted of four lengths of the pool, one each in backstroke, breaststroke, butterfly and freestyle swimming.

== Records ==
Prior to this competition, the existing world and Pan American Games records were as follows:

World record	Ryan Lochte (USA)	1:54.00	Shanghai, China	July 28, 2011
Pan American Games record	Thiago Pereira (BRA)	1:57.79	Rio de Janeiro, Brazil	July 20, 2007

== Qualification ==
Each National Olympic Committee (NOC) was able to enter up to two entrants providing they had met the A standard (2:07.2) in the qualifying period (January 1, 2010 to September 4, 2011). NOCs were also permitted to enter one athlete providing they had met the B standard (2:11.0) in the same qualifying period.

== Results ==
All times are in minutes and seconds.

KEY:	q	Fastest non-qualifiers	Q	Qualified	GR	Games record	NR	National record	PB	Personal best	SB	Seasonal best

=== Heats ===
The first round was held on October 19.

Rank	Heat	Lane	Name	Nationality	Time	Notes
1	2	5	Conor Dwyer	United States	2:04.56	QA
2	2	4	Thiago Pereira	Brazil	2:04.84	QA
3	1	4	Henrique Rodrigues	Brazil	2:04.88	QA
4	1	3	Ezequiel Trujillo	Mexico	2:05.43	QA
5	2	3	Lyam Dias	Canada	2:05.47	QA
6	1	6	Esteban Enderica	Ecuador	2:06.03	QA
7	2	6	Miguel Robles	Mexico	2:06.37	QA
8	1	5	William Harris	United States	2:07.74	QA
9	2	2	Luis Rojas	Venezuela	2:08.17	QB
10	2	7	Pedro Medel	Cuba	2:10.46	QB
11	1	2	Branden Whitehurst	Virgin Islands	2:12.71	QB
12	1	7	Diguan Pigot	Suriname	2:13.40	QB
13	2	8	Eladio Carrión	Puerto Rico	2:13.57	QB
14	1	1	Joel Romeu	Uruguay	2:18.02	QB
15	2	1	Sebastian Jahnsen	Peru	2:26.70	QB

=== B Final ===
The B final was also held on October 19.

Rank	Lane	Name	Nationality	Time	Notes
9	4	Luis Rojas	Venezuela	2:09.22	
10	5	Branden Whitehurst	Virgin Islands	2:10.89	
11	6	Eladio Carrión	Puerto Rico	2:11.14	
12	3	Diguan Pigot	Suriname	2:15.11	

=== A Final ===
The A final was also held on October 19.

Rank	Lane	Name	Nationality	Time	Notes
1st place, gold medalist(s)	5	Thiago Pereira	Brazil	1:58.07	
2nd place, silver medalist(s)	4	Conor Dwyer	United States	1:58.64	
3rd place, bronze medalist(s)	3	Henrique Rodrigues	Brazil	2:03.41	
4	6	Ezequiel Trujillo	Mexico	2:04.36	
5	2	Lyam Dias	Canada	2:05.06	
6	7	Esteban Enderica	Ecuador	2:05.10	
7	1	Miguel Robles	Mexico	2:06.89	
8	8	William Harris	United States	2:08.25	
