= Swimming at the 2011 Pan American Games – Men's 400 metre individual medley =

Men's 400 metre individual medley at the 2011 Pan American Games
- Venue: Scotiabank Aquatics Center
- Dates: October 15 (preliminaries and finals)
- Competitors: 11 from 9 nations

Medalists
Gold medal	Thiago Pereira	Brazil
Silver medal	Conor Dwyer	United States
Bronze medal	Robert Margalis	United States

The men's 400 metre individual medley competition of the swimming events at the 2011 Pan American Games took place on the 15 of October at the Scotiabank Aquatics Center. The defending Pan American Games champion is Thiago Pereira of Brazil.

This race consisted of eight lengths of the pool. The first two lengths were swum using the butterfly stroke, the second pair with the backstroke, the third pair of lengths in breaststroke, and the final two were freestyle.

== Records ==
Prior to this competition, the existing world and Pan American Games records were as follows:

World record	Michael Phelps (USA)	4:03.84	Beijing, China	August 10, 2008
Pan American Games record	Thiago Pereira (BRA)	4:11.14	Rio de Janeiro, Brazil	July 17, 2007

== Qualification ==
Each National Olympic Committee (NOC) was able to enter up to two entrants providing they had met the A standard (4:34.2) in the qualifying period (January 1, 2010 to September 4, 2011). NOCs were also permitted to enter one athlete providing they had met the B standard (4:41.5) in the same qualifying period.

== Results ==
All times shown are in minutes.

KEY:	q	Fastest non-qualifiers	Q	Qualified	NR	National record	PB	Personal best	SB	Seasonal best

=== Heats ===
The first round was held on October 15.

Rank	Heat	Lane	Name	Nationality	Time	Notes
1	2	5	Conor Dwyer	United States	4:24.98	QA
2	2	4	Thiago Pereira	Brazil	4:26.27	QA
3	1	4	Robert Margalis	United States	4:29.70	QA
4	2	3	Esteban Enderica	Ecuador	4:31.15	QA
5	2	6	Ezequiel Trujillo	Mexico	4:31.31	QA
6	1	6	Esteban Paz	Argentina	4:34.08	QA
7	1	5	Diogo Yabe	Brazil	4:34.18	QA
8	1	3	Liam Dias	Canada	4:37.60	QA
9	1	2	Eddy Marin	Venezuela	4:38.88	QB
10	2	2	Diego Castillo	Panama	4:45.31	QB
11	2	7	Joel Romeu	Uruguay	4:53.76	QB

=== B Final ===
The B final was also held on October 15.

Rank	Lane	Name	Nationality	Time	Notes
9	5	Diego Castillo	Panama	4:40.04	
10	4	Eddy Marin	Venezuela	4:40.08	

=== A Final ===
The A final was held on October 15.

Rank	Lane	Name	Nationality	Time	Notes
1st place, gold medalist(s)	5	Thiago Pereira	Brazil	4:16.68	
2nd place, silver medalist(s)	4	Conor Dwyer	United States	4:18.22	
3rd place, bronze medalist(s)	3	Robert Margalis	United States	4:24.88	
4	6	Esteban Enderica	Ecuador	4:26.43	
5	2	Ezequiel Trujillo	Mexico	4:30.02	
6	8	Liam Dias	Canada	4:34.11	
7	1	Diogo Yabe	Brazil	4:35.66	
8	7	Esteban Paz	Argentina	4:37.67	
