= Swimming at the 2010 South American Games – Men's 400 metre individual medley =

The Men's 400m individual medley event at the 2010 South American Games was held on March 29, with the heats at 11:02 and the Final at 18:25.

== Medalists ==
Gold	Silver	Bronze
Thiago Pereira; Brazil	Esteban Enderica; Ecuador	Cristhian Orjuela; Colombia

== Records ==
Standing records prior to the 2010 South American Games
World record	Michael Phelps (USA)	4:03.84	Beijing, China	10 August 2008
Competition Record	Diogo Yabe (BRA)	4:31.91	Buenos Aires, Argentina	18 November 2006
South American record	Thiago Pereira (BRA)	4:08.86	Rome, Italy	2 August 2009

== Results ==
=== Heats ===
Rank	Heat	Lane	Athlete	Result	Notes
1	3	4	Thiago Pereira (BRA)	4:36.48	Q
2	1	3	Cristhian Orjuela (COL)	4:38.92	Q
3	2	3	Benjamin Blanco (CHI)	4:39.74	Q
4	3	6	Diego Bonilla (COL)	4:42.12	Q
5	3	3	Esteban Enderica (ECU)	4:42.40	Q
6	2	5	Diego Castillo (PAN)	4:43.56	Q
7	1	6	Joel Romeu (URU)	4:45.40	Q
8	1	5	Sebastián Jahnsen Madico (PER)	4:45.46	Q
9	2	6	Esteban Paz (ARG)	4:46.41	
10	3	2	Victor de la Rosa Garcia (PER)	4:58.17	
11	3	5	Gaston Rodriguez (ARG)	5:00.56	
12	1	2	Julio Laurentino (PAR)	5:23.39	
	1	4	Leopoldo Andara (VEN)	DNS	
	2	2	Diguan Pigot (SUR)	DNS	
	2	4	Leonardo de Deus (BRA)	DNS	
	2	7	Armando Esteban Claure (BOL)	DNS	
	3	7	Jair Boerenveen (SUR)	DNS	

=== Final ===
Rank	Lane	Athlete	Result	Notes
1st place, gold medalist(s)	4	Thiago Pereira (BRA)	4:28.79	CR
2nd place, silver medalist(s)	2	Esteban Enderica (ECU)	4:30.41	
3rd place, bronze medalist(s)	5	Cristhian Orjuela (COL)	4:35.24	
4	3	Benjamin Blanco (CHI)	4:38.76	
5	8	Sebastián Jahnsen Madico (PER)	4:45.00	
6	7	Diego Castillo (PAN)	4:45.06	
7	6	Diego Bonilla (COL)	4:45.11	
8	1	Joel Romeu (URU)	4:56.56	
