= Swimming at the 2007 Pan American Games – Men's 400 metre individual medley =

The Men's 400m Individual Medley (IM) event at the 2007 Pan American Games was staged at the Maria Lenk Aquatic Park in Rio de Janeiro, Brazil on 16 and 17 July. 18 swimmers swam prelims of the event, the top-8 of which advanced to the next day's final.

== Medalists ==
Gold	Thiago Pereira; Brazil
Silver	Robert Margalis; United States
Bronze	Keith Beavers; Canada

== Records ==
Record	Athlete	Time	Date	Venue
World Record	Michael Phelps (USA)	4:06.22	2007-04-01	(Australia) Melbourne
Pan Am Record	Curtis Myden (CAN)	4:15.52	1999-08-03	(Canada) Winnipeg

== Results ==
Rank	Swimmer	Prelims		Final
Rank	Swimmer	Time	Rank	Time
1	Thiago Pereira (BRA)	4:18.93	1	4:11.14
2	Robert Margalis (USA)	4:19.56	2	4:17.52
3	Keith Beavers (CAN)	4:19.68	3	4:19.01
4	Diogo Yabe (BRA)	4:25.72	7	4:25.18
5	Bradley Ally (BAR)	4:23.04	4	4:25.36
6	Tobias Oriwol (CAN)	4:24.84	6	4:26.85
7	Andrew Callahan (USA)	4:23.84	5	4:26.86
8	Omar Pinzón (COL)	4:30.76	8	4:28.82
9	Benjamin Guzmán (CHI)	4:31.97		
10	Gaston Rodríguez (ARG)	4:34.02		
11	Diego Castillo (PAN)	4:39.06		
12	Gianmarco Mosto (PER)	4:39.43		
13	Daniel Quiepo (URU)	4:39.64 NR		
14	Douwe Yntema (ESA)	4:40.48		
15	Branden Whitehurst (ISV)	4:41.14 NR		
16	Morgan Locke (ISV)	4:47.89		
17	Christian Homer (TRI)	4:55.50		
—	Leopoldo Andara (VEN)	DNS		
