= Swimming at the 2014 South American Games – Men's 200 metre individual medley =

Men's 200 metre individual medley at the 2014 South American Games
- Venue: Estadio Nacional
- Dates: March 9, 2014 (heats & finals)
- Competitors: 13 from 9 nations
- Winning time: 2:00.29

Medalists
gold medal	Thiago Pereira	Brazil
silver medal	Thiago Simon	Brazil
bronze medal	Carlos Claverie	Venezuela

The men's 200 metre individual medley competition at the 2014 South American Games took place on March 9 at the Estadio Nacional. The last champion was Thiago Pereira of Brazil.

This race consisted of four lengths of the pool, one each in backstroke, breaststroke, butterfly and freestyle swimming.

== Records ==
Prior to this competition, the existing world and Pan Pacific records were as follows:

World record	Ryan Lochte (USA)	1:54.00	Shanghai, China	July 28, 2011
South American Games record	Thiago Pereira (BRA)	2:03.16	Medellín, Colombia	March 28, 2010

== Results ==
All times are in minutes and seconds.

KEY:	q	Fastest non-qualifiers	Q	Qualified	CR	Championships record	NR	National record	PB	Personal best	SB	Seasonal best

=== Heats ===
The first round was held on March 9, at 11:47.

Rank	Heat	Lane	Name	Nationality	Time	Notes
1	2	5	Carlos Claverie	Venezuela	2:07.09	Q
2	2	4	Thiago Simon	Brazil	2:08.62	Q
3	1	4	Thiago Pereira	Brazil	2:09.00	Q
4	1	3	Guido Buscaglia	Argentina	2:09.56	Q
5	1	5	Juan Pablo Botero	Colombia	2:11.14	Q
6	2	3	Matías López	Paraguay	2:11.60	Q
7	1	2	Felipe Quiroz Uteau	Chile	2:11.71	Q
8	1	6	Andrew Rutherfurd	Bolivia	2:11.93	Q
9	2	6	Enrique Duran Garcia Bedoya	Peru	2:12.10	
10	2	1	Wayne Denswil	Suriname	2:12.68	
11	2	2	Carlos Polit Carvajal	Ecuador	2:14.67	
12	1	7	Eduardo Opazo Rojas	Chile	2:16.30	
13	2	7	Byron Franco Zambrano	Ecuador	2:22.34	

=== Final ===
The final was held on March 9, at 19:16.

Rank	Lane	Name	Nationality	Time	Notes
1st place, gold medalist(s)	3	Thiago Pereira	Brazil	2:00.09	CR
2nd place, silver medalist(s)	5	Thiago Simon	Brazil	2:02.80	
3rd place, bronze medalist(s)	4	Carlos Claverie	Venezuela	2:05.77	
4	7	Matías López	Paraguay	2:06.26	NR
5	2	Juan Pablo Botero	Colombia	2:09.29	
6	8	Andrew Rutherfurd	Bolivia	2:10.81	NR
7	6	Guido Buscaglia	Argentina	2:10.89	
8	1	Felipe Quiroz Uteau	Chile	2:11.71	
