= 2014 FINA World Swimming Championships (25 m) – Men's 100 metre individual medley =

Men's 100 metre individual medley at the 2014 FINA World Swimming Championships (25 m)
- Dates: 6 December (heats and semifinals); 7 December (final)
- Competitors: 88 from 68 nations
- Winning time: 50.66

Medalists
gold medal	Markus Deibler	Germany
silver medal	Vladimir Morozov	Russia
bronze medal	Ryan Lochte	United States

The Men's 100 metre individual medley competition of the 2014 FINA World Swimming Championships (25 m) was held on 6 December with the heats and the semifinals and 7 December with the final.

== Records ==
Prior to the competition, the existing world and championship records were as follows.

	Name	Nation	Time	Location	Date
World record Championship record	Ryan Lochte	United States	50.71	Istanbul	15 December 2012

The following records were established during the competition:

Date	Event	Name	Nation	Time	Record
7 December	Heats	Markus Deibler	Germany	50.66	WR, CR

== Results ==
=== Heats ===
The heats were held at 11:04.

Rank	Heat	Lane	Name	Nationality	Time	Notes
1	10	4	Vladimir Morozov	Russia	51.57	Q
2	10	5	Sergey Fesikov	Russia	52.08	Q
3	8	4	Markus Deibler	Germany	52.16	Q
4	9	4	Kosuke Hagino	Japan	52.62	Q
5	9	6	Ryan Lochte	United States	52.66	Q
6	1	5	Marcin Cieślak	Poland	52.68	Q
7	8	8	Henrique Rodrigues	Brazil	52.73	Q
8	8	5	Takuro Fujii	Japan	52.77	Q
9	10	2	Marco Orsi	Italy	53.04	Q
10	9	2	Martti Aljand	Estonia	53.17	Q
11	8	7	Dávid Földházi	Hungary	53.23	Q
12	6	8	Andreas Vazaios	Greece	53.35	Q
13	7	2	Yakov Toumarkin	Israel	53.36	Q
14	10	0	Jan Šefl	Czech Republic	53.52	Q
15	10	3	Thiago Simon	Brazil	53.55	Q
15	10	1	Sebastien Rousseau	South Africa	53.55	Q
17	9	3	Emmanuel Vanluchene	Belgium	53.58	
18	1	3	Ben Hockin	Paraguay	53.73	
19	6	1	Jérémy Desplanches	Switzerland	53.74	
20	4	3	Omar Pinzón	Colombia	53.96	
20	8	1	Raphaël Stacchiotti	Luxembourg	53.96	
20	10	7	Leith Shankland	South Africa	53.96	
23	6	2	Apostolos Christou	Greece	53.99	
24	7	8	Aleksey Derlyugov	Uzbekistan	54.01	
24	10	6	Diogo Carvalho	Portugal	54.01	
26	8	6	Daniel Skaaning	Denmark	54.25	
27	10	8	Boris Stojanović	Serbia	54.26	
28	8	9	Russell Wood	Canada	54.31	
29	9	8	Sverre Næss	Norway	54.44	
30	4	4	Rexford Tullius	United States Virgin Islands	54.53	
31	9	1	Alexis Santos	Portugal	54.83	
32	7	5	Alexandru Coci	Romania	54.87	
33	9	0	Chris Christensen	Denmark	55.01	
34	7	9	Ensar Hajder	Bosnia and Herzegovina	55.04	
34	10	9	Taki Mrabet	Tunisia	55.04	
36	6	5	Janis Saltans	Latvia	55.32	
37	8	0	Sun Xiaolei	China	55.41	
38	9	9	Martin Baďura	Czech Republic	55.55	
39	7	6	Mak Ho Lun Raymond	Hong Kong	55.66	
40	5	5	Antons Voitovs	Latvia	55.79	
41	7	7	Julien Henx	Luxembourg	55.90	
42	5	8	Marko Blaževski	Macedonia	55.98	
43	6	9	Teimuraz Kobakhidze	Georgia	56.11	
44	6	6	Péter Holoda	Hungary	56.30	
45	7	1	Ivan Andrianov	Azerbaijan	56.46	
46	7	4	Jiang Tiansheng	China	56.67	
47	5	9	Matthew Abeysinghe	Sri Lanka	56.71	
48	6	0	Josué Domínguez	Dominican Republic	56.75	
49	5	7	Pedro Pinotes	Angola	56.78	
50	7	0	Kristinn Þórarinsson	Iceland	56.95	
51	5	1	Jessie Lacuna	Philippines	56.99	
52	5	3	Jamal Chavoshifar	Iran	57.14	
53	5	6	Kolbeinn Hrafnkelsson	Iceland	57.26	
54	6	7	Christoph Meier	Liechtenstein	58.08	
55	4	7	Joaquin Sepulveda	Chile	58.35	
56	5	2	Soroush Ghandchi	Iran	58.42	
57	5	0	Isaac Beitia	Panama	59.00	
58	6	3	Davletbaev Damir	Kyrgyzstan	59.26	
59	3	2	David van der Colff	Botswana	59.33	
60	4	1	Matthew Courtis	Barbados	59.34	
61	3	3	Winter Heaven	Samoa	59.43	
62	4	8	Douglas Miller	Fiji	59.67	
63	4	6	Jean Pierre Monteagudo	Peru	59.84	
64	4	2	Colin Bensadon	Gibraltar	1:00.27	
65	4	5	Miguel Mena	Nicaragua	1:00.76	
66	4	9	Maroun Waked	Lebanon	1:01.38	
67	1	4	Omar Al-Malki	Bahrain	1:01.83	
68	4	0	Noah Al-Khulaifi	Qatar	1:01.88	
69	3	5	Stanford Kawale	Papua New Guinea	1:02.04	
70	3	7	Khalid Al-Kulaibi	Oman	1:02.96	
71	3	4	Franci Aleksi	Albania	1:03.56	
72	3	9	Livingston Aika	Papua New Guinea	1:03.67	
73	2	5	Kgosietsile Molefinyane	Botswana	1:04.19	
74	2	3	Giordan Harris	Marshall Islands	1:04.43	
75	3	6	Yacop Al-Khulaifi	Qatar	1:04.54	
76	3	0	Nikolas Sylvester	Saint Vincent and the Grenadines	1:04.61	
77	2	4	Temaruata Strickland	Cook Islands	1:05.19	
78	3	8	Binald Mahmuti	Albania	1:05.24	
79	2	0	Justine Rodríguez	Federated States of Micronesia	1:06.46	
80	2	1	Storm Hablich	Saint Vincent and the Grenadines	1:09.13	
81	2	8	Htut Ahnt Khaung	Myanmar	1:09.55	
82	2	6	Mohamed Adnan	Maldives	1:10.77	
83	2	2	Mamadou Soumaré	Mali	1:11.39	
84	2	7	Atta Atta	Ivory Coast	1:14.71	
—	3	1	Ali Al-Kaabi	United Arab Emirates		DNS
—	8	3	Fabio Scozzoli	Italy		DNS
—	9	5	Tom Shields	United States		DNS
—	9	7	Travis Mahoney	Australia		DNS
—	5	4	Hüseyin Sakçı	Turkey		DSQ
—	6	4	Robert Žbogar	Slovenia		DSQ
—	7	3	Badis Djendouci	Algeria		DSQ
—	8	2	Gal Nevo	Israel		DSQ

=== Semifinals ===
The semifinals were held at 19:11.

==== Semifinal 1 ====
Rank	Lane	Name	Nationality	Time	Notes
1	5	Kosuke Hagino	Japan	51.89	Q
2	4	Sergey Fesikov	Russia	51.98	Q
3	3	Marcin Cieślak	Poland	52.39	Q
4	6	Takuro Fujii	Japan	52.51	Q
5	2	Dávid Földházi	Hungary	53.08	
6	1	Thiago Simon	Brazil	53.33	
7	7	Yakov Toumarkin	Israel	53.72	
8	8	Ben Hockin	Paraguay	53.94	

==== Semifinal 2 ====
Rank	Lane	Name	Nationality	Time	Notes
1	3	Ryan Lochte	United States	51.41	Q
2	5	Markus Deibler	Germany	51.46	Q
3	4	Vladimir Morozov	Russia	51.60	Q
4	6	Henrique Rodrigues	Brazil	52.51	Q
5	8	Emmanuel Vanluchene	Belgium	52.63	
6	7	Andreas Vazaios	Greece	53.09	
7	2	Martti Aljand	Estonia	53.15	
8	1	Jan Šefl	Czech Republic	53.38	

=== Final ===
The final was held at 18:41.

Rank	Lane	Name	Nationality	Time	Notes
1st place, gold medalist(s)	5	Markus Deibler	Germany	50.66	WR
2nd place, silver medalist(s)	3	Vladimir Morozov	Russia	50.81	
3rd place, bronze medalist(s)	4	Ryan Lochte	United States	51.24	
4	6	Kosuke Hagino	Japan	51.30	AS
5	2	Sergey Fesikov	Russia	51.35	
6	8	Henrique Rodrigues	Brazil	52.20	SA
7	1	Takuro Fujii	Japan	52.26	
8	7	Marcin Cieślak	Poland	52.27	
