= Alexis Márquez =

Alexis Márquez may refer to:

- Alexis Márquez (swimmer)
- Alexis Márquez (footballer)
