= 2006 Pan Pacific Swimming Championships – Men's 100 metre butterfly =

Men's 100 metre butterfly at the 2006 Pan Pacific Swimming Championships
- Venue: Saanich Commonwealth Place; Saanich, British Columbia, Canada
- Dates: August 19, 2006 (heats & finals)
- Competitors: 34 from 11 nations
- Winning time: 51.47

Medalists
gold medal	Ian Crocker	United States
silver medal	Ryo Takayasu	Japan
bronze medal	Takashi Yamamoto	Japan

The men's 100 metre butterfly competition at the 2006 Pan Pacific Swimming Championships took place on August 19 at the Saanich Commonwealth Place. The last champion was Ian Crocker of US.

This race consisted of two lengths of the pool, all in butterfly.

== Records ==
Prior to this competition, the existing world and Pan Pacific records were as follows:

World record	Ian Crocker (USA)	50.40	Montreal, Quebec, Canada	July 30, 2005
Pan Pacific Championships record	Ian Crocker (USA)	52.21	Yokohama, Japan	August 18, 2002

== Results ==
All times are in minutes and seconds.

KEY:	q	Fastest non-qualifiers	Q	Qualified	CR	Championships record	NR	National record	PB	Personal best	SB	Seasonal best

=== Heats ===
The first round was held on August 19, at 10:52.

Rank	Heat	Lane	Name	Nationality	Time	Notes
1	5	4	Ian Crocker	United States	51.78	QA, CR
2	5	5	Ryo Takayasu	Japan	52.96	QA
2	5	2	Lyndon Ferns	South Africa	52.96	QA
4	3	4	Takashi Yamamoto	Japan	53.24	QA
5	5	3	Ryuichi Shibata	Japan	53.26	QA
6	3	6	Gabriel Mangabeira	Brazil	53.35	QA
7	5	6	Kaio Almeida	Brazil	53.44	QA
8	3	5	Davis Tarwater	United States	53.58	QA
9	4	3	Joe Bartoch	Canada	53.68	QB
10	5	7	Andrew Lauterstein	Australia	53.87	QB
11	4	5	Moss Burmester	New Zealand	54.01	QB
12	4	6	Fernando Silva	Brazil	54.18	QB
13	4	4	Corney Swanepoel	New Zealand	54.26	QB
14	5	1	Thomas Kindler	Canada	54.30	QB
15	3	2	Jeremy Knowles	Bahamas	54.33	QB
16	4	1	Daniel Madwed	United States	54.38	QB
17	3	3	Ben Wildman-Tobriner	United States	54.44	
18	3	7	Joshua Krogh	Australia	54.51	
19	1	4	Travis Nederpelt	Australia	54.86	
20	3	8	Thiago Pereira	Brazil	54.92	
21	3	1	Adam Sioui	Canada	55.04	
22	5	8	Nick D'Arcy	Australia	55.27	
23	2	6	Stefan Hirniak	Canada	55.32	
24	4	8	Marco Sapucaia	Brazil	55.43	
25	2	5	Cameron van der Burgh	South Africa	55.46	
26	2	3	Jonathan Blouin	Canada	55.76	
26	2	7	Chung Yong	South Korea	55.76	
28	1	5	Nicolas Oliveira	Brazil	56.03	
29	2	8	Zheng Lei	China	56.13	
30	4	7	Sun Xiaolei	China	56.34	
31	2	2	Andrew McMillan	New Zealand	56.45	
32	2	1	Hsu Chi-Chien	Chinese Taipei	56.65	
33	1	3	Jordan Hartney	Canada	56.95	
34	2	4	Chen Yanlong	China	57.89	
-	4	2	Roland Schoeman	South Africa	DSQ	

=== B Final ===
The B final was held on August 19, at 18:57.

Rank	Lane	Name	Nationality	Time	Notes
9	4	Ryuichi Shibata	Japan	53.10	
10	5	Andrew Lauterstein	Australia	53.82	
11	3	Moss Burmester	New Zealand	53.85	
12	1	Jeremy Knowles	Bahamas	54.07	
13	7	Thomas Kindler	Canada	54.28	
14	6	Fernando Silva	Brazil	54.39	
15	8	Daniel Madwed	United States	54.46	
16	2	Corney Swanepoel	New Zealand	54.52	

=== A Final ===
The A final was held on August 19, at 18:57.

Rank	Lane	Name	Nationality	Time	Notes
1st place, gold medalist(s)	4	Ian Crocker	United States	51.47	CR
2nd place, silver medalist(s)	3	Ryo Takayasu	Japan	52.59	
3rd place, bronze medalist(s)	6	Takashi Yamamoto	Japan	52.71	
4	5	Lyndon Ferns	South Africa	52.90	
5	2	Gabriel Mangabeira	Brazil	53.36	
6	1	Davis Tarwater	United States	53.55	
7	8	Joe Bartoch	Canada	53.56	
8	7	Kaio Almeida	Brazil	53.88	
