= Swimming at the 2011 Pan American Games – Men's 200 metre backstroke =

Men's 100 metre backstroke at the 2011 Pan American Games
- Venue: Scotiabank Aquatics Center
- Dates: October 21 (preliminaries and finals)
- Competitors: 11 from 8 nations

Medalists
Gold medal	Thiago Pereira	Brazil
Silver medal	Omar Pinzón	Colombia
Bronze medal	Ryan Murphy	United States

The men's 200 metre backstroke competition of the swimming events at the 2011 Pan American Games took place on 21 October at the Scotiabank Aquatics Center. The defending Pan American Games champion was Thiago Pereira of Brazil.

This race consisted of four lengths of the pool, all in backstroke.

== Records ==
Prior to this competition, the existing world and Pan American Games records were as follows:

World record	Aaron Peirsol (USA)	1:51.92	Rome, Italy	July 31, 2009
Pan American Games record	Thiago Pereira (BRA)	1:58.42	Rio de Janeiro, Brazil	July 19, 2007

== Qualification ==
Each National Olympic Committee (NOC) was able to enter up to two entrants providing they had met the A standard (2:04.1) in the qualifying period (January 1, 2010 to September 4, 2011). NOCs were also permitted to enter one athlete providing they had met the B standard (2:07.8) in the same qualifying period.

== Results ==
All times are in minutes and seconds.

KEY:	q	Fastest non-qualifiers	Q	Qualified	GR	Games record	NR	National record	PB	Personal best	SB	Seasonal best

=== Heats ===
The first round was held on October 21.

Rank	Heat	Lane	Name	Nationality	Time	Notes
1	1	5	Omar Pinzón	Colombia	2:01.14	QA
2	1	4	Thiago Pereira	Brazil	2:03.53	QA
3	2	4	Rexford Tullius	United States	2:03.82	QA
4	2	3	Ryan Murphy	United States	2:03.89	QA
5	2	5	Leonardo de Deus	Brazil	2:05.12	QA
6	1	3	Pedro Medel	Cuba	2:05.20	QA
7	1	6	Luis Rojas	Venezuela	2:05.21	QA
8	1	2	Charles Hockin	Paraguay	2:05.28	QA
9	2	6	Ezequiel Trujillo	Mexico	2:05.68	
10	2	2	Anival Rodriguez	Mexico	2:10.65	
11	2	7	Mauricio Fiol	Peru	2:11.75	

=== Final A ===
The final was held on October 21.

Rank	Lane	Name	Nationality	Time	Notes
1st place, gold medalist(s)	5	Thiago Pereira	Brazil	1:57.19	GR, NR
2nd place, silver medalist(s)	4	Omar Pinzón	Colombia	1:58.31	
3rd place, bronze medalist(s)	3	Ryan Murphy	United States	1:58.50	
4	3	Rexford Tullius	United States	1:59.50	
5	2	Leonardo de Deus	Brazil	2:03.28	
6	1	Luis Rojas	Venezuela	2:06.07	
7	8	Ezequiel Trujillo	Mexico	2:06.18	
8	7	Pedro Medel	Cuba	2:13.77	
