= Swimming at the 2007 Pan American Games – Men's 100 metre backstroke =

The Men's 100m Backstroke event at the 2007 Pan American Games occurred at the Maria Lenk Aquatic Park in Rio de Janeiro, Brazil, with the final being swum on July 22.

== Medalists ==
Gold	Randall Bal; United States
Silver	Peter Marshall; United States
Bronze	Thiago Pereira; Brazil

== Results ==
=== Finals ===
Place	Swimmer	Country	Time	Note
1	Randall Bal	United States	53.66	
2	Peter Marshall	United States	54.64	
3	Thiago Pereira	Brazil	54.75	
4	Pascal Wollach	Canada	55.91	
5	Leonardo Guedes	Brazil	56.13	
6	Tommy Sacco	Canada	56.22	
7	Omar Pinzón	Colombia	56.26	
8	Nicholas Neckles	Barbados	56.36	
