= Markus Deibler =

German swimmer (born 1990)

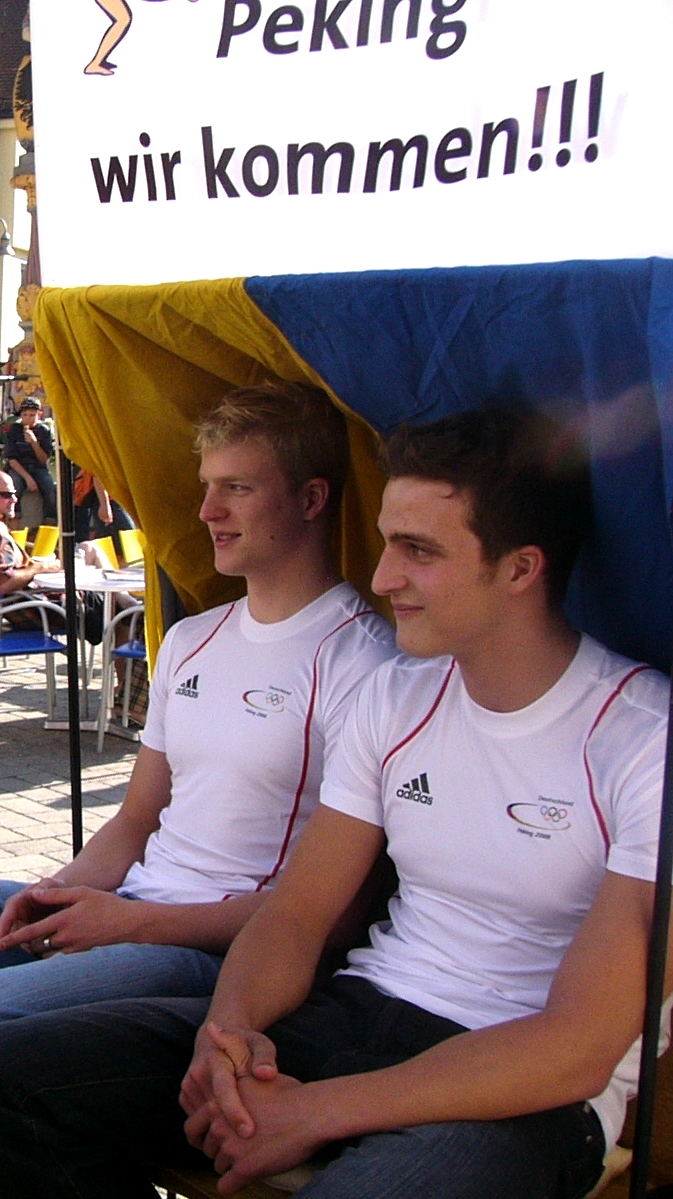
- Markus Deibler (right) with his brother Steffen in 2008

Personal information
- Born: 28 January 1990 (age 36) Biberach an der Riß, West Germany
- Height: 1.97 m (6 ft 6 in)
- Weight: 94 kg (207 lb)

Sport
- Sport: Swimming
- Club: TG Biberach
Medal record
Representing Germany
World Championships (SC)
Gold medal – first place	2014 Doha	100 m medley
European Championships (SC)
Gold medal – first place	2010 Eindhoven	100 m medley
Gold medal – first place	2010 Eindhoven	200 m medley
Gold medal – first place	2010 Eindhoven	4×50 m medley
Silver medal – second place	2010 Eindhoven	4×50 m freestyle
Silver medal – second place	2011 Szczecin	100 m medley

Markus Deibler (born 28 January 1990) is a German swimmer who competed at the 2008 and 2012 Olympics. In 2008 he finished in 40th place in the 200 m individual medley. In 2012 he was sixth in the 4 × 100 m freestyle and 4 × 100 m medley relays and eighth in the 200 m medley. He won three gold and two silver medals at the short-course European championships in 2010 and 2011.

His elder brother Steffen also competed in swimming at the 2008 and 2012 Olympics.

Records
Preceded by (United States) Ryan Lochte	Men's 100 metre individual medley world record holder (short course); 7 December 2014 – 26 August 2016	Succeeded by (Russia) Vladimir Morozov
