= Daniel Madwed =

American swimmer (born 1989)

Dan Madwed
Personal information
- Full name: Daniel Lawrence Madwed
- National team: United States
- Born: March 15, 1989 (age 37) Stamford, Connecticut, U.S.
- Height: 6 ft 0 in (182.9 cm)

Sport
- Sport: Swimming
- Strokes: Butterfly, freestyle
- Club: North Baltimore Athletic Club; Club Wolverine
- College team: University of Michigan (2012)
- Coach: Mike Bottom (University of Michigan)
Medal record
Men's swimming
Representing the United States
World Championships (LC)
Gold medal – first place	2009 Rome	4×200 m freestyle
Pan American Games
Gold medal – first place	2011 Guadalajara	4×200 m freestyle
Silver medal – second place	2011 Guadalajara	200 m butterfly
Universiade
Gold medal – first place	2007 Bangkok	4×200 m freestyle
Silver medal – second place	2007 Bangkok	4x100 m medley
Bronze medal – third place	2007 Bangkok	200 m butterfly
Maccabiah Games
Gold medal – first place	2005 Israel	100 m butterfly
Gold medal – first place	2005 Israel	200 m butterfly
Gold medal – first place	2005 Israel	4×100 m freestyle
Gold medal – first place	2005 Israel	4×200 m freestyle

Daniel Lawrence Madwed (born March 15, 1989) is an American swimmer who was an All-American at Michigan University and competed in both the 2004 and 2008 U.S. Olympic trials in his signature event, the 200-meter backstroke. A skilled freestyle competitor known on the world stage, he received a gold medal in the 4 × 200 m freestyle relay at the 2009 World Aquatics Championships in Rome, Italy and won a gold medal with a record time in the 200-meter butterfly at the 2005 Maccabiah Games in Jerusalem.

== Early life ==
Madwed was born in Stamford, Connecticut on March 15, 1989. He attended Stamford's Westhill High School winning several state championships during his years as an underclassman, and after a move to Baltimore graduated Towson High School in 2007. Turning sixteen at the early April, 2005 World Championship Trials at the IU Indianapolis Natatorium, he swam for the Sharks Swim Team, and recorded a time of 2:00.15 in the 200 Butterfly, placing third. Prior to 2007, he moved to Baltimore, Maryland to train with the North Baltimore Aquatics Club.

== Career highlights ==
He swam in the 2005 Maccabiah Games in Jerusalem, Israel where he won a gold medal and set a new Maccabiah Games record in the men's 200-meter butterfly.

He competed at the 2006 Pan Pacific Championships in Victoria, British Columbia, and was the youngest American male swimmer at the event. He placed 10th in the 200 m butterfly, 15th in the 100 m butterfly, and 15th in the 200 m individual medley.

In 2007, Madwed competed at the World University Games in Bangkok, where he won a gold medal as a part of the 4 × 200 m freestyle relay, a silver as a part of the 4 × 100 m medley relay, and a bronze in the 200 m butterfly.

=== 2004-8 Olympic Trials ===
Madwed qualified and participated in the 2004 Olympic trials in Long Beach, California, qualifying in his signature event, the 200-meter butterfly.

At the 2008 US Olympic Trials in Omaha, Nebraska, Madwed placed 5th in the 200 m butterfly and 6th in the 200 m individual medley. Madwed also entered the 200 m freestyle, 400 m freestyle, and the 100 m butterfly. He did not advance past the preliminaries in those events.

At the 2009 US National Championships and World Championship Trials, Madwed placed second to Peter Vanderkaay in the 400 m freestyle with a time of 3:47.24, earning a place to compete at the 2009 World Aquatics Championships in Rome. At Nationals, Madwed also placed third in the 200 m butterfly final and 7th in the 200 m freestyle preliminaries. At the World Championships, Madwed placed ninth in the 400 m freestyle in 3:45.95, barely missing a place in the final. Madwed also competed in the preliminaries of the 4 × 200 m freestyle, where he swam the second leg in 1:45.63. The US won the gold medal in the final.

== University of Michigan ==
Madwed attended and swam for the University of Michigan Swimming and Diving team from around 2008-2012 under Hall of Fame Coach Mike Bottom. He studied at the Engineering College, receiving a degree in industrial & operations engineering. During his swimming tenure at Michigan, he was a Big Ten Champion 14 times. He was honored as the Big Ten Swimmer of the Championships in 2012, where he won conference titles in the 400-yard freestyle relay, the 800-yard freestyle relay, as well as the 200 and 100-yard butterfly. In 2011, he was an All-American in the NCAA in the 200 and 100-yard butterfly, and the 400 and 800-yard freestyle relays.

== Personal ==
In addition to his undergraduate studies, Madwed studied as an Industrial and Operations engineering Masters student at the University of Michigan and trained with Club Wolverine. Prior to attending Michigan, he swam with the North Baltimore Aquatic Club for two years.

== Personal bests ==
Long course
Stroke	Distance	Time	Date
Freestyle	100 m	49.97	July 2008
Freestyle	200 m	1:47.31	July 2009
Freestyle	400 m	3:45.95	July 2009
Butterfly	100 m	53.14	July 2008
Butterfly	200 m	1:56.13	July 2009
Medley	200 m	2:00.62	July 2008
