= Saint Petersburg Aquatics =

USA Swimming Club in Saint Petersburg, Florida

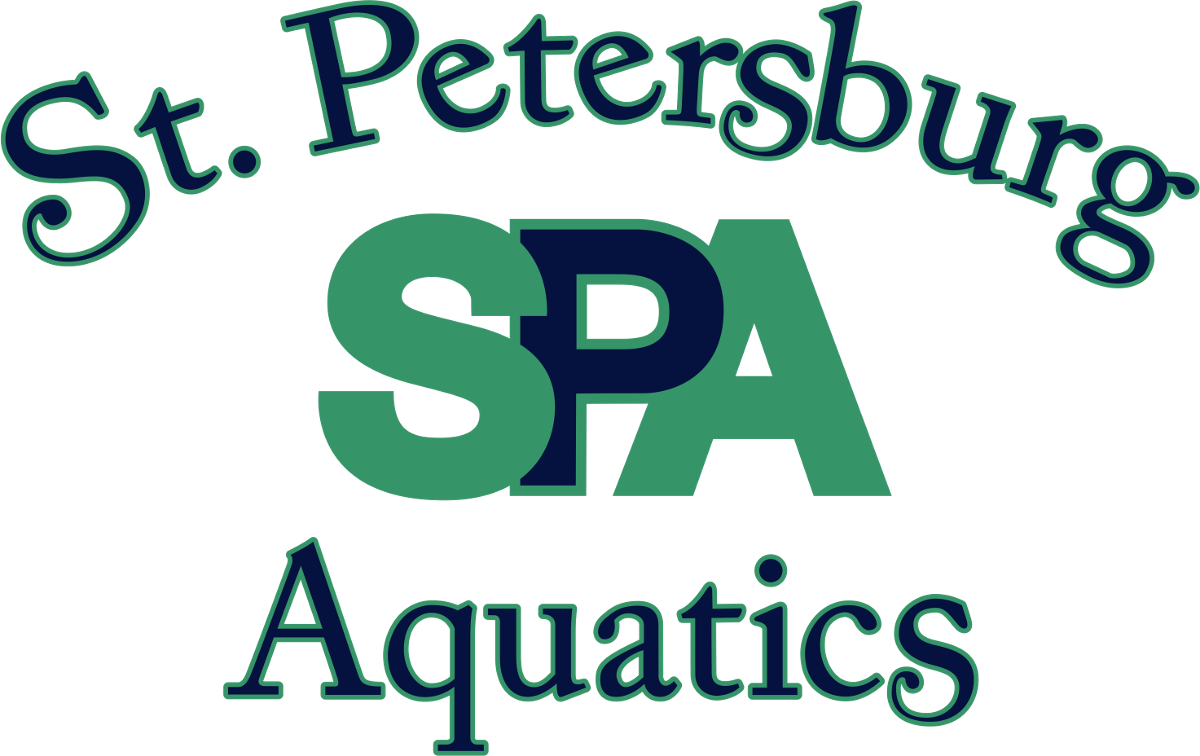

Club information
- Short name: SPA
- City: Saint Petersburg, Florida, United States
- Home pool: Northshore Aquatic Complex

Swimming
- Head coach: Fred Lewis

Saint Petersburg Aquatics (SPA) is a year-round competitive swim team located at Northshore Aquatic Complex in Saint Petersburg, Florida. The club has been awarded the Bronze Medal status by USA Swimming, designating St. Petersburg Aquatics as one of the top 200 clubs in the country. SPA has produced four olympic gold medalists and numerous collegiate level swimmers, Olympic Trial Swimmers, and Team USA swimmers.

== Locations ==
Saint Petersburg Aquatics' main pool is located within the Northshore Aquatic Complex. During summer, Saint Petersburg Aquatics offers practices at other various area pools.

== Notable swimmers ==
Bobby Finke is a previous swimmer for Saint Petersburg Aquatics. He won gold medals in the 800m and 1500m freestyle at the 2020 Summer Olympics in Tokyo. Finke won the gold medal in the 1500m freestyle in world record time at the 2024 Summer Olympics in Paris, as well as the silver medal in the 800m freestyle.

Melanie Margalis swam for Saint Petersburg Aquatics while she was in high school. She won a gold medal in the 4×200 m freestyle at the 2016 Summer Olympics in Rio de Janeiro. She is also the sister of Robert Margalis.

Nicole Haislett grew up swimming for Saint Petersburg Aquatics from age 6 through high school. She won three gold medals in the 1992 Summer Olympics in Barcelona in the 200m freestyle, 400m medley relay, and 400m free relay.

Megan Romano is an American competition swimmer who specializes in backstroke and freestyle events. She swam for Fred Lewis on Saint Petersburg Aquatics before becoming a Georgia Bulldog.

Robert Margalis swam for Saint Petersburg Aquatics and is also the brother of Melanie Margalis.

Joshua McQueen swam for Saint Petersburg Aquatics. In 2017, McQueen broke the nearly 20 year old Saint Petersburg city record for the 200 yard freestyle. The same day, McQueen also broke the record for the 500 yard freestyle.

== Coaches ==
Saint Petersburg Aquatics' head coach is Fred Lewis, joining the program in 1988. Lewis was previously the head men's coach at the University of Pittsburgh.
