= Swimming at the 2007 Pan American Games – Men's 4 × 200 metre freestyle relay =

Men's 4 × 200 metre freestyle relay at the 2007 Pan American Games
- Venue: Maria Lenk Aquatic Park
- Date: July 17 (Final)
- Competitors: 28 from 7 nations
- Winning time: 7:12.27

Medalists
Gold medal	Thiago Pereira; Rodrigo Castro; Lucas Salatta; Nicolas Oliveira	Brazil
Silver medal	Ricky Berens; Matthew Owen; Andy Grant; Robert Margalis	United States
Bronze medal	Chad Hankewich; Stefan Hirniak; Pascal Wollach; Adam Sioui	Canada

The Men's 4x200m Freestyle Relay at the 2007 Pan American Games took place at the Maria Lenk Aquatic Park in Rio de Janeiro, Brazil, with the final being swum on July 17, 2007.

== Results ==
=== Finals ===
Place	Nation	Swimmers	Time	Note
1st place, gold medalist(s)	Brazil	Thiago Pereira (1:48.63); Rodrigo Castro (1:49.38); Lucas Salatta (1:47.63); Nicolas Oliveira (1:46.63)	7:12.27	CR, SA
2nd place, silver medalist(s)	United States	Ricky Berens (1:48.61); Matthew Owen (1:48.91); Andy Grant (1:47.91); Robert Margalis (1:49.57)	7:15.00	
3rd place, bronze medalist(s)	Canada	Chad Hankewich (1:49.76); Stefan Hirniak (1:50.04); Pascal Wollach (1:49.63); Adam Sioui (1:48.30)	7:17.73	
4	Mexico	Amauri Rodríguez (1:52.06); Juan Veloz (1:51.14); Juan Alberto Yeh (1:52.98); Iván de Jesús López (1:51.97)	7:28.15	NR
5	Venezuela	Crox Acuña (1:51.10); Jesús Casanova (1:54.64); Alejandro Gómez (1:54.74); Albert Subirats (1:54.78)	7:35.26	
6	Chile	Salvador Mallat (1:53.65); Maximiliano Schnettler (1:56.01); Roberto Peñailillo (1:59.46); Benjamin Guzmán (1:56.01)	7:45.13	
7	Virgin Islands	Kieran Locke(1:56.44); Branden Whitehurst (1:56.73); Morgan Locke (1:58.48); Ryan Nelthropp (2:00.06)	7:51.71	NR
