= Thiago Simon =

Brazilian swimmer (born 1990)

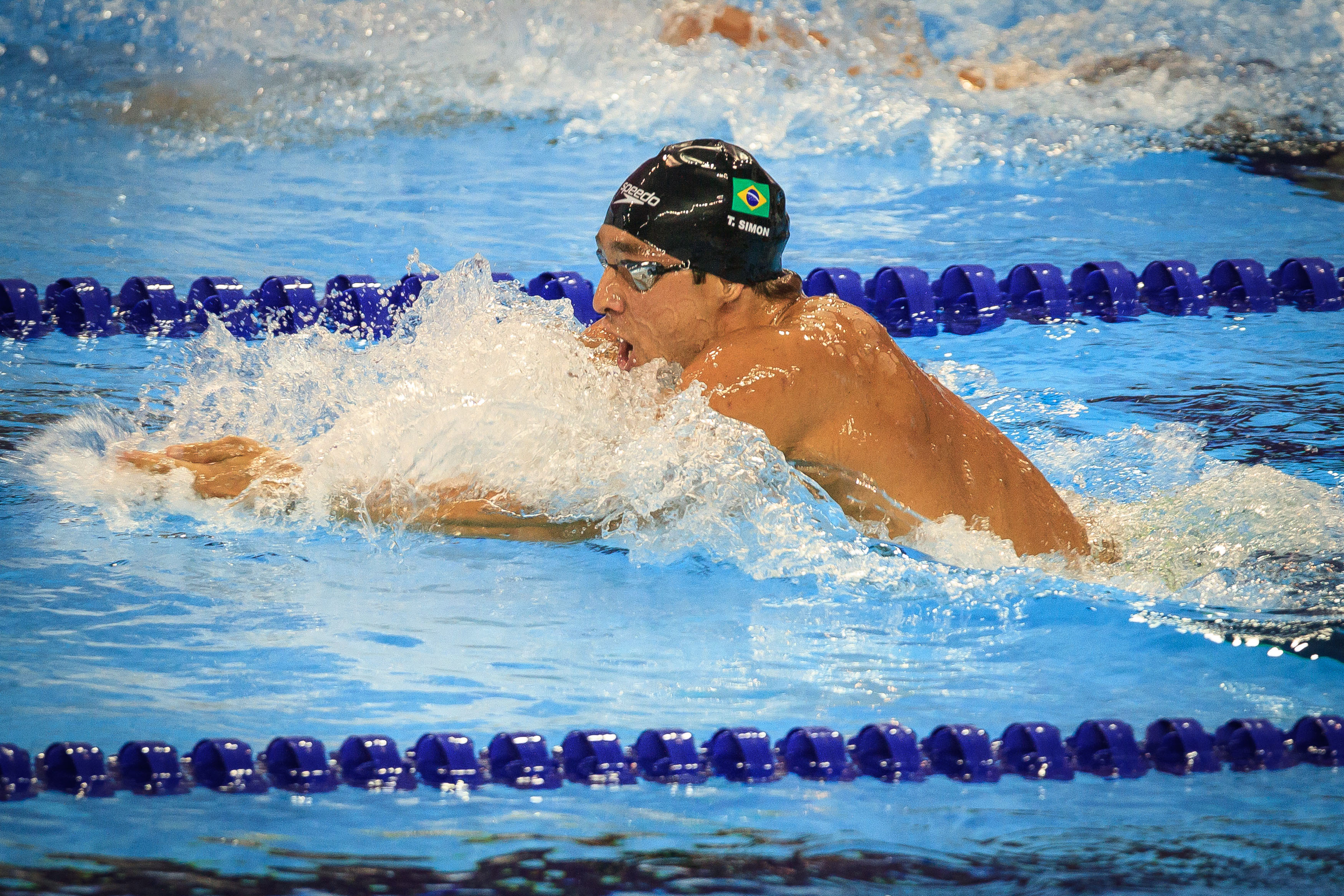

Personal information
- Full name: Thiago Teixeira Simon
- Nationality: Brazil
- Born: April 3, 1990 (age 36) Penápolis, São Paulo, Brazil
- Height: 1.84 m (6 ft 0 in)
- Weight: 93 kg (205 lb)

Sport
- Sport: Swimming
- Strokes: Breaststroke, Medley
Medal record
Men's swimming
Representing Brazil
Pan American Games
Gold medal – first place	2015 Toronto	200 m breaststroke
Gold medal – first place	2015 Toronto	4×200 m freestyle
South American Games
Silver medal – second place	2014 Santiago	200 m medley
Bronze medal – third place	2014 Santiago	400 m medley

Thiago Teixeira Simon (born April 3, 1990 in Penápolis) is a Brazilian swimmer.

== International career ==
=== 2014–16 ===
At the 2014 South American Games in Santiago, Chile, Simon won a silver medal in the 200-metre individual medley, and a bronze medal in the 400-metre individual medley.

At the 2014 José Finkel Trophy in Guaratinguetá, Simon broke the short-course South American record in the 200-metre breaststroke, with a time of 2:04.28.

At the 2015 Pan American Games in Toronto, Canada, Simon won a gold medal in the 200 metre breaststroke, with a time of 2:09.82, new Pan American Games record. He also won a gold medal in the 4×200-metre freestyle relay, by participating at heats.

At the 2015 World Aquatics Championships in Kazan, Simon finished 29th in the Men's 200 metre breaststroke

=== 2016 Summer Olympics ===
At the 2016 Summer Olympics, he competed in the Men's 200-metre breaststroke, finishing in 36th place overall in the heats.

=== 2016-20 ===
On 13 September 2016, at the José Finkel Trophy (short-course competition), he broke the South American record in the 200-metre breaststroke, with a time of 2:02.58.

At the 2016 FINA World Swimming Championships (25 m) in Windsor, Ontario, Canada, he finished 9th in the Men's 200 metre breaststroke, and 13th in the Men's 200 metre individual medley.

At the 2017 World Aquatics Championships in Budapest, he finished 19th in the Men's 200 metre individual medley and 26th in the Men's 200 metre breaststroke.
