= Swimming at the 2007 Pan American Games – Men's 200 metre individual medley =

The Men's 200m Individual Medley (IM) event at the 2007 Pan American Games occurred at the Maria Lenk Aquatic Park in Rio de Janeiro, Brazil, with the final being swum on July 20.

At this race, Bradley Ally won the first medal of his country in swimming at Pan American Games at all times.

== Medalists ==
Gold	Thiago Pereira; Brazil
Silver	Robert Margalis; United States
Bronze	Bradley Ally; Barbados

== Results ==
=== Finals ===
Place	Swimmer	Country	Time	Note
1	Thiago Pereira	Brazil	1:57.79	CR, SA
2	Robert Margalis	United States	2:00.69	
3	Bradley Ally	Barbados	2:00.96	
4	Keith Beavers	Canada	2:01.36	
5	Geoff Rathgeber	United States	2:02.58	
6	Nicholas Bovell	Trinidad and Tobago	2:03.02	
7	Jeremy Knowles	Bahamas	2:03.71	
8	Diogo Yabe	Brazil	2:05.72	
