= Caylee Watson =

U.S. Virgin Islands swimmer (born 1994)

Personal information
- Born: October 10, 1994 (age 31)

Sport
- Sport: Swimming
- Strokes: Backstroke

Caylee Watson (born October 10, 1994) is a swimmer from the United States Virgin Islands. She competed at the 2016 Summer Olympics in the women's 100 metre backstroke; her time of 1:07.19 in the heats did not qualify her for the semifinals.
