= Robert Margalis =

American swimmer (born 1982)

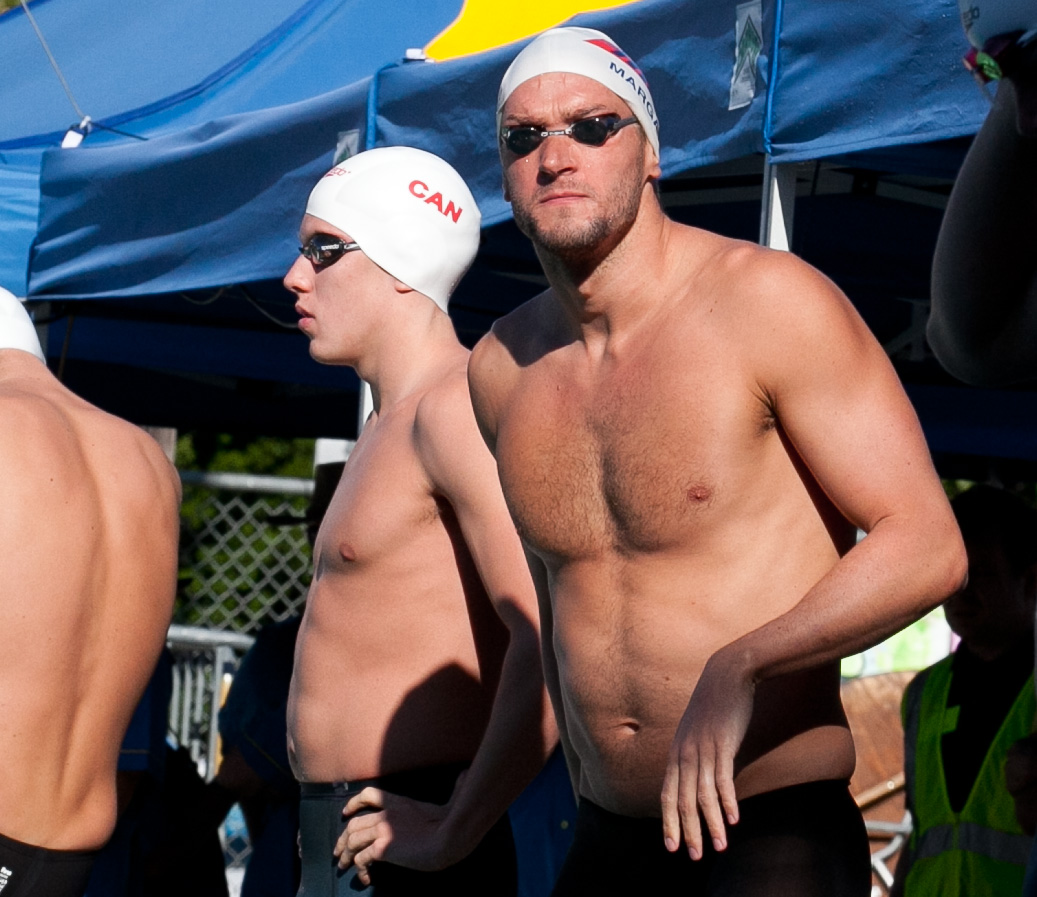
- Margalis in 2012, prior to swimming the 400 Individual Medley in a meet

Personal information
- National team: United States
- Born: February 8, 1982 (age 44) Queens, New York, U.S.
- Height: 6 ft 3 in (191 cm)
- Spouses: Beth Grahams (Oct, 2006)
- Children: twin boys (As of 2022)
- Relatives: Melanie Margalis, sister

Sport
- Sport: Swimming
- Events: Individual Medley, Medley relay, Freestyle Relay
- Strokes: Medley; Freestyle
- Club: Saint Petersburg Aquatics; FAST Swim Team (After 2010) (Fullerton Area Swim Team)
- College team: University of Georgia
- Coach: Jack Bauerle (U. Georgia)
Medal record
Men's swimming
Representing the United States
World Championships (SC)
Silver medal – second place	2008 Manchester	400 m medley
Pan Pacific Championships
Silver medal – second place	2006 Victoria	400 m medley
Pan American Games
Gold medal – first place	2003 Santo Domingo	400 m medley
Gold medal – first place	2011 Guadalajara	4×200 m freestyle
Silver medal – second place	2007 Rio	200 m medley
Silver medal – second place	2007 Rio	400 m medley
Silver medal – second place	2007 Rio	4x200 m freestyle
Bronze medal – third place	2011 Guadalajara	400 m medley

Robert Margalis (born February 8, 1982) is an American medley and freestyle relay swimmer who competed for the University of Georgia, and won a gold and three silver medals at the 2003 Pan American Games and 2007 Pan American Games. Margalis won the gold medal in the men's 400-meter Individual Medley event at the 2003 Pan American Games. At the next edition, four years later in Rio de Janeiro, he captured three silver medals. At the 2011 Pan Americans, Margalis won a gold and bronze medal in the 4x200 freestyle relay and the 400 meter Individual Medley events. He captured a silver medal at the 2008 FINA Short Course World Championships in Manchester in the 400 meter Individual Medley. He has also been a frequent top ten finisher in California Open Water distance swims.

Robert Margalis was born February 8, 1982 in Queens, New York to Mr. and Mrs. Robert Margalis, later of Clearwater, Florida. Margalis graduated Florida's Clearwater High School, and swam on the Saint Petersburg Aquatics club team, with his sister Melanie Margalis

== University of Georgia ==
He enrolled and swam for the University of Georgia from around 2000-2004 under long-serving Coach Jack Bauerle. Bauerle had a legendary career at Georgia from around 1978 through 2022, coaching the women's team from 1978-2022, and the men's team from 1983-2022. While swimming for Georgia, Margalis captured the NCAA national title for the 400-yard individual medley and was a Southeastern Conference Champion in individual events twice. He was an All-American in events sixteen times. For eleven years, his recorded time in the 400 IM remained a Georgia school record, until broken in 2014.

== Marriage ==
Not long after graduating college, Margalis married Beth Grahams on October 14, 2006 at a Beach Ceremony in Wilbur-by-the-Sea. At the time, Grahms, also a graduate of and swimming competitor for the University of Georgia, where they likely met, was working as an underwriter for Insurance Company Raymond James. The couple planned a July 2007 honeymoon in Brazil where Margalis would compete in the Pan American Championships.

== International competition highlights ==
Margalis won the gold medal in the men's 400-meter individual medley event at the 2003 Pan American Games in Santa Domingo. At the following Games, four years later in Rio de Janeiro, he captured three silver medals. He took a silver in the 200 m individual medley, the 400 m individual medley and the 4x200 m freestyle relay. Later at the 2011 Panama Games in Guadalajara he won a bronze medal in the 400-meter Individual Medley, and a gold medal in the 4×200 m freestyle.

In the 2006 Pan Pacific Championships in Victoria, he won a silver medal in the 400 Meter medley, and captured a silver medal at the 2008 Manchester Short Course World Championships in the 400 meter medley.

=== U.S. Master's swimmming ===
Margalis swam for United States Masters Swimming, primarily for Saint Petersburg Masters, where he received first place age group men's times for 18+ in the 200, 1000, and 1650 freestyle and the 200 Butterfly and 200 and 400 Individual Medley in Short Course Yards for the age group 25-29 in 2007, and a top ten place in the 100-butterfly at age 35 in 2017.

=== Careers ===
Around 2010, Margalis and his wife Beth relocated to Fullerton, California to allow Robert to train for the 2012 Olympics, primarily with the Fullerton Area Swim Team. After making the U.S. National team, Robert began volunteering at Fullerton's Bootleggers Brewery packing bottles, before taking a paid position cleaning kegs, as an entry level job. He eventually worked his way to a position as Head Brewer, managing daily activities, where he oversaw personnel, insured that the company met quality standards and even wrote new recipes. He became the primary production supervisor. He left the business in 2021 to spend more time with his twin boys, Henry and John.

=== Honors ===
Margalis became an inductee to the University of Georgia Circle of Honor in 2021.
