= Rex Tullius =

American swimmer (born 1987)

Personal information
- Born: Rexford Tullius; March 10, 1987 (age 39)

Sport
- Sport: Swimming
- Strokes: Backstroke
- College team: Florida Gators
Medal record
Representing United States
Pan American Games
Gold medal – first place	2011 Guadalajara	4 × 200m freestyle relay
Summer Universiade
Silver medal – second place	2011 Shenzhen	200m backstroke
Silver medal – second place	2011 Shenzhen	4 × 100m medley relay

Rexford 'Rex' Tullius (born March 10, 1987) is a swimmer from Port Orange, Florida. He won gold in the 4 × 200-meter relay as part of the US team at the 2011 Pan American Games, is a five-time All-American, and represented the US Virgin Islands at the 2016 Summer Olympics.

Tullius grew up in Port Orange, Florida, enrolling at the University of Florida in 2005. Representing their swim team, he competed throughout college in various regional and national competitions. He medaled in and won several events during his time there, reaching All-American status five times across various events. In 2011, Tullius competed internationally for the United States. He won gold at the Pan American Games in the 4 × 200 m relay after swimming in the heats for the US team, and two silvers at the Summer Universiade in the 200 m backstroke and as part of the US team in the 4 × 100 m medley relay.

In 2015, Tullius began representing the US Virgin Islands in international competition. He broke the US Virgin Islands records in the 100 m and 200 m backstroke events at the 2015 World Aquatics Championships, and he broke the national record again in the 200 m backstroke at the 2016 Summer Olympics with a time of 1:59.14.

== Early life ==
Rexford Tullius was born on March 10, 1987. He came to be known as "Rex". Tullius grew up in Port Orange, Florida, attending Spruce Creek High School and the Daytona Beach Swim Club, where he was coached by Steve Lochte (Ryan Lochte's father). He competed in several regional and national championships while in high school, including at the 2005 Junior Nationals where he finished sixth in the 200-meter backstroke.

== Early college career ==
In 2005, he enrolled at the University of Florida and joined the Florida Gators swim team coached by Gregg Troy. Tullius competed for them at various regional and national championships such as the NCAAs and the SEC Championships, receiving his first All-America honor at the 2008 NCAA Championships after swimming a time of 1:46.13 in the 200-yard backstroke. During his time at the University of Florida, Tullius went on to earn All-American status four more times across various events.

At the 2008 US Olympic Trials, Tullius beat his personal best by three seconds to finish fourth in the 200-meter backstroke, which was two spots away from making the US Olympic team; he later stated that this performance left him "hungry" to get on the team in the future. Tullius continued training with the University of Florida swim team as a post graduate. He medalled at several national- and regional-level competitions from 2009 to 2010, including winning gold in the 200-yard backstroke at the 2009 SEC Championships, silver in the 100-yard backstroke at the 2009 US Short Course Championships, and gold in the 200-yard freestyle and silver in the 200-yard backstroke at the 2010 Short Course Championships.

== International medals ==
At the 2011 US Long Course Championships, Tullius finished second in the 200-meter backstroke with a time of 1:57.48, which ranked him 14th in the world in the event. This performance earned him an invitation to compete for the US at the 2011 Pan American Games, and later that year he was announced as part of the US national team.

At the 2011 Summer Universiade, Tullius represented the US team which won silver with a time of 3:37.92 in the 4 × 100 m medley relay, and he won an individual silver in the 200 m backstroke with a time of 1:58.66. Later that season at the Pan American Games, he competed in the 200 m backstroke, where he finished fourth, and he swam in the heats of the 4 × 200 meter freestyle relay as part of the US team. Since the US went on to win the event, Tullius was awarded a gold medal as part of the team. In 2012 he again competed at the US Olympic trials in the 200 m backstroke, where he finished sixth, which was not fast enough to make the Olympic team.

== Olympic debut representing the US Virgin Islands ==
After moving on from competitive swimming and earning a master's degree in construction management at the University of Florida, Tullius began working for a property development company on Saint John in the US Virgin Islands. After a friend suggested it to him, Tullius discovered he met the requirements to compete for the Islands, so he began training for international competition again.

In his international debut competing for the US Virgin Islands, Tullius won both the 100 m and 200 m backstroke events at the 2015 Central American and Caribbean Swimming Championships, breaking the 100 m competition record. Later in the season, he competed at the 2015 World Aquatics Championships, where he finished 37th with a time of 55.88 in the 100 m backstroke and 26th in the 200 m backstroke with 2:01.22, not progressing out of the heats in either event. Both of these times were US Virgin Islands records.

Having swum times fast enough to qualify for the 2016 Summer Olympics, Tullius temporarily moved to Singapore to train with other Olympic qualifiers prior to the Games under the Singapore national team coach Sergio Lopez. At the Games, representing the US Virgin Islands, Tullius competed in the 200 m backstroke, where he swam a national record of 1:59.14 to finish 20th in the heats, which was not fast enough to progress to the semifinals. On competing at the Olympics, Tullius said: "It's one of those few experiences a person can look forward to where almost every human emotion can be felt and decades worth of work can be put to the test."

== Business career ==
Tullius continued to work as a property developer through his Olympic training. In 2021, he became the Vice President of Strategic Partnerships at Premier, a design and development firm, and as of 2025, he is the Senior Vice President of Development at the same company.
