= Gastón Rodríguez (swimmer) =

Argentine swimmer (born 1984)

Personal information
- Full name: Gastón Rodríguez
- National team: Argentina
- Born: 10 March 1984 (age 42) Villa María, Córdoba, Argentina
- Height: 1.85 m (6 ft 1 in)
- Weight: 84 kg (185 lb)

Sport
- Sport: Swimming
- Strokes: Butterfly
- Club: CAUC

Gastón Rodríguez (born March 10, 1984) is an Argentine swimmer, who specialized in butterfly events. He currently holds short-course Argentine records in the 200 m butterfly (1:57.34) and 200 m individual medley (2:01.03), both from the national championships in Rosario.

Rodriguez qualified for the men's 200 m butterfly at the 2004 Summer Olympics in Athens, by posting a FINA B-standard entry time of 2:03.77 from the Latin Cup in Serravalle, San Marino. He topped the first heat by a 1.60-second margin over Indonesia's Donny Utomo, outside his entry time of 2:04.01. Rodriguez failed to advance into the semifinals, as he placed twenty-ninth overall in the preliminaries.

In 2005, Rodriguez lowered his national record to 2:02.26 at the Argentina Long Course Championships in Buenos Aires. He also sought his bid for the 2008 Summer Olympics in Beijing, until his slot was awarded instead to Andrés José González, who posted an entry time of 2:00.82. Gaston Rodriguez won 48 National Titles in his entire career. and Break 5 National Records.

Rodriguez reached the pinnacle of his international career in 2009, when he finished fourth in the 200 m butterfly (1.57.45) at the Durban stop of the FINA World Cup series. On May 12, 2012, he was ordered a 15-month suspension by the Argentina Aquatics Confederation (Spanish: Confederación Argentina de Deportes Acuáticos) for failing a rare doping test from the previous year's national championships.
