= Andrés José González =

Argentine swimmer (born 1989)

Personal information
- Full name: Andrés José González
- National team: Argentina
- Born: 25 March 1989 (age 37) San Francisco, Córdoba, Argentina
- Height: 1.84 m (6 ft 0 in)
- Weight: 78 kg (172 lb)

Sport
- Sport: Swimming
- Strokes: Butterfly
Medal record
Men's swimming
Representing Argentina
South American Games
Bronze medal – third place	2010 Medellín	200 m butterfly

Andrés José González (born March 25, 1989) is an Argentine swimmer, who specialized in butterfly events. He represented his nation Argentina at the 2008 Summer Olympics, and eventually captured a bronze medal in the 200 m butterfly at the 2010 South American Games in Medellin, Colombia.

Gonzalez competed for Argentina in the men's 200 m butterfly at the 2008 Summer Olympics in Beijing. Leading up to the Games, he won the race with a sterling 2:00.82 to dip beneath the FINA B-standard (2:01.80) at the Latin Cup in Serravalle, San Marino. Trailing from behind throughout the race in heat two, Gonzalez came up with a spectacular swim at the final turn to hit the wall with a third-place time and a new Argentine record in 2:00.36. Gonzalez failed to advance into the semifinals, as he placed thirty-third overall in the prelims.
