= Alexis Márquez (swimmer) =

Venezuelan swimmer (born 1989)

Personal information
- Full name: Alexis Márquez Rivas
- National team: Venezuela
- Born: 25 March 1989 (age 37) Caracas, Venezuela
- Height: 1.69 m (5 ft 7 in)
- Weight: 68 kg (150 lb)

Sport
- Sport: Swimming
- Strokes: Butterfly
- Club: Club De Tenis Elche

Alexis Márquez Rivas (born March 25, 1989) is a Venezuelan swimmer, who specialized in butterfly events. He represented his nation Venezuela at the 2008 Summer Olympics, and currently holds a short course Venezuelan record in the 200 m butterfly (1:59.77) at the 2011 Copa de España Clubes Segunda Division in Castellón de la Plana, Spain.

Marquez competed for Venezuela in the men's 200 m butterfly at the 2008 Summer Olympics in Beijing. Leading up to the Games, he touched with a runner-up time in 2:00.89 to beat the FINA B-cut (2:01.80) at the Latin Cup in Serravalle, San Marino. Swimming on the outside in heat two, Marquez rallied from behind at the start to edge out Puerto Rico's Douglas Lennox-Silva by 0.44 of a second on a late charge for the fifth spot with a 2:01.25. Marquez failed to advance to the semifinals, as he placed thirty-sixth overall in the prelims.
