= Branden Whitehurst =

United States Virgin Islands swimmer (born 1989)

Personal information
- Born: November 10, 1989 (age 36) Orlando, Florida, United States

Sport
- Sport: Swimming

Branden Whitehurst (born November 10, 1989) is a Virgin Islander swimmer. At the 2012 Summer Olympics, he competed in the Men's 100 metre freestyle, finishing in 36th place overall in the heats and failing to qualify for the semifinals.
