= Diego Castillo (swimmer) =

Panamanian swimmer (born 1991)

Personal information
- Full name: Diego Jésus Castillo Granados
- Born: July 5, 1991 (age 35)

Sport
- Sport: Swimming
- Strokes: Butterfly

Diego Jésus Castillo Granados (born July 5, 1991) is a Panamanian swimmer. At the 2012 Summer Olympics, he competed in the Men's 200 metre butterfly, finishing in 35th place overall in the heats, failing to qualify for the semifinals.
