= Thiago Pereira =

Brazilian swimmer (born 1986)

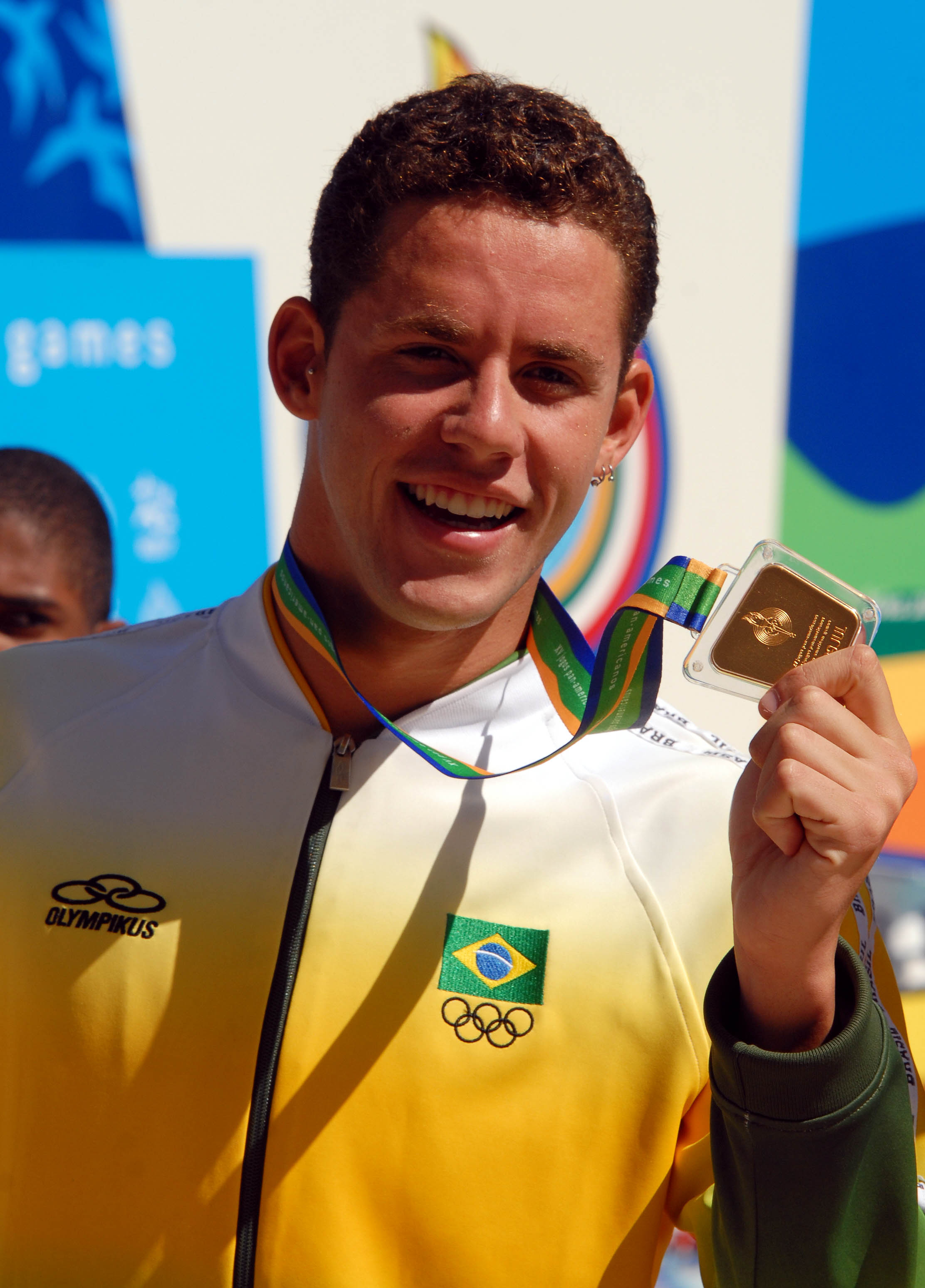
- Pereira with 200 m medley gold medal at 2007 Pan American Games

Personal information
- Full name: Thiago Machado Vilela Pereira
- Nickname: "Mr. Pan"
- National team: Brazil
- Born: 26 January 1986 (age 40) Volta Redonda, Rio de Janeiro, Brazil
- Height: 1.87 m (6 ft 2 in)
- Weight: 77 kg (170 lb)

Sport
- Sport: Swimming
- Strokes: Medley, freestyle
- Club: Fiat/Minas
Medal record
Men's swimming
Representing Brazil
Event	1st	2nd	3rd
Olympic Games	0	1	0
World Championships (LC)	0	1	2
World Championships (SC)	1	1	2
Pan Pacific Championships	0	0	3
Pan American Games	15	4	4
South American Games	7	3	0
Total	23	10	11
Olympic Games
Silver medal – second place	2012 London	400 m medley
World Championships (LC)
Silver medal – second place	2015 Kazan	200 m medley
Bronze medal – third place	2013 Barcelona	200 m medley
Bronze medal – third place	2013 Barcelona	400 m medley
World Championships (SC)
Gold medal – first place	2004 Indianapolis	200 m medley
Silver medal – second place	2004 Indianapolis	4x100 m freestyle
Bronze medal – third place	2004 Indianapolis	100 m medley
Bronze medal – third place	2004 Indianapolis	4x200 m freestyle
Pan Pacific Championships
Bronze medal – third place	2006 Victoria	400 m medley
Bronze medal – third place	2010 Irvine	200 m medley
Bronze medal – third place	2010 Irvine	400 m medley
Pan American Games
Gold medal – first place	2007 Rio de Janeiro	200 m backstroke
Gold medal – first place	2007 Rio de Janeiro	200 m breaststroke
Gold medal – first place	2007 Rio de Janeiro	200 m medley
Gold medal – first place	2007 Rio de Janeiro	400 m medley
Gold medal – first place	2007 Rio de Janeiro	4x100 m freestyle
Gold medal – first place	2007 Rio de Janeiro	4x200 m freestyle
Gold medal – first place	2011 Guadalajara	200 m medley
Gold medal – first place	2011 Guadalajara	400 m medley
Gold medal – first place	2011 Guadalajara	100 m backstroke
Gold medal – first place	2011 Guadalajara	200 m backstroke
Gold medal – first place	2011 Guadalajara	4x100 m freestyle
Gold medal – first place	2011 Guadalajara	4x100 m medley
Gold medal – first place	2015 Toronto	4×100 m freestyle
Gold medal – first place	2015 Toronto	4×200 m freestyle
Gold medal – first place	2015 Toronto	4×100 m medley
Silver medal – second place	2003 Santo Domingo	200 m medley
Silver medal – second place	2007 Rio	4x100 m medley
Silver medal – second place	2011 Guadalajara	4x200 m freestyle
Silver medal – second place	2015 Toronto	200 m medley
Bronze medal – third place	2003 Santo Domingo	400 m medley
Bronze medal – third place	2007 Rio de Janeiro	100 m backstroke
Bronze medal – third place	2011 Guadalajara	200 m breaststroke
Bronze medal – third place	2015 Toronto	200 m breaststroke
South American Games
Gold medal – first place	2002 Belém	200 m breaststroke
Gold medal – first place	2010 Medellín	200 m medley
Gold medal – first place	2010 Medellín	400 m medley
Gold medal – first place	2010 Medellín	200 m breaststroke
Gold medal – first place	2014 Santiago	200 m medley
Gold medal – first place	2014 Santiago	400 m medley
Gold medal – first place	2014 Santiago	4x200 m freestyle
Silver medal – second place	2010 Medellín	200 m backstroke
Silver medal – second place	2010 Medellín	4x100 m freestyle
Silver medal – second place	2010 Medellín	4x200 m freestyle

Thiago Machado Vilela Pereira (born 26 January 1986) is a retired Brazilian international competition swimmer. One of the greatest swimmers in the history of Brazil, Pereira won the silver medal in the 400-meter individual medley at the 2012 Summer Olympics in London, finishing ahead of defending Olympic champion Michael Phelps. He also broke the world record in the short course 200-meter individual medley, and broke several South American and Brazilian records. During his career, he competed with swimming legends Michael Phelps and Ryan Lochte.

Pereira is a resident of Belo Horizonte, and became known as Ricardo Prado's successor in his native country after winning the silver medal in the 200-meter individual medley at the Pan American Games in Santo Domingo, Dominican Republic in 2003. In 2004, he won the world title in the same event at the 2004 FINA Short Course World Championships. After that, Pereira won six gold medals at the 2007 Pan American Games in Rio de Janeiro, breaking the record of five gold medals won in one Pan American Games, previously held by Mark Spitz. Pereira broke the short course 200-meter individual medley world record later that same year. He represented Brazil at three consecutive Summer Olympics, starting in 2004.

As of July 2015, Pereira is the Brazilian athlete with most gold medals won in Pan American Games: 15 earned in four Pan American Games. In 2015, Pereira became the athlete with the most medals in the history of Pan American Games, surpassing the Cuban gymnast Eric López, who won 22 medals between 1991 and 2003. Pereira finished Toronto with 23 total medals.

== Early years, clubs and personal life ==
Pereira started swimming at age two when his mother enrolled him in swimming school after he fell into a pool and nearly drowned. At 12, he won his first medal, a bronze in a competition in Volta Redonda, Brazil. At the same age, he won a federated championship in a competition in Valença, defending the CSN club. After several more competition wins between the ages of 13 and 16, Pereira received a proposal to join Belo Horizonte's Minas Tênis Clube in 2001, under the command of coach Fernando Vanzela. From there, Pereira became ranked among the top swimmers in Brazil and the world.

Pereira trained in the United States in 2005, moving shortly after the 2004 Summer Olympics. He moved to Coral Springs, Florida, but could not adapt to the local environment, methods and customs, and returned to Belo Horizonte. In 2009, after Pereira and Vanzela analyzed his options, Pereira moved to Auburn, California and trained at University of Southern California under coach Dave Salo. He remained with USC's Trojan Swim Club for two years.

In April 2010, Pereira joined the swimming team of São Paulo's Sport Club Corinthians Paulista. In August 2011, he accepted a proposal to integrate into César Cielo's project PRO 16, under the command of Brazil's national swimming team coach Albertinho Silva. In December that year, he announced that would stay in Brazil full-time, living in São Paulo to train with Silva. In 2013, he left Corinthians Paulista and PRO 16, and shortly afterwards he joined the SESI-SP club.

In early 2013, Pereira married lawyer Gabi Pauletti.

In April 2015, Pereira returned to Minas Tênis Clube, his first professional club.

== International career ==
=== 2002–04 ===
At the age of 16, Pereira competed at the 2002 South American Games in Belém, where he won a gold medal in the 200-meter breaststroke.

Pereira competed at the 2003 World Aquatics Championships in Barcelona, where he finished 18th in the 200-meter individual medley, 24th in the 400-meter individual medley, and 25th in the 200-meter breaststroke. In the 200-meter individual medley, he broke the South American record for the first time, with a time of 2:02.67.

At the 2003 Pan American Games in Santo Domingo, Pereira won the silver medal in the 200-meter individual medley, and a bronze medal in the 400-meter individual medley. In the 200-meter individual medley, he broke the South American record with a time of 2:02.31.

In September 2003, he broke Marcelo Tomazini's South American record in the 200-meter breaststroke with a time of 2:15.63.

In December 2003, Pereira won the 400-meter individual medley event—the third event of the 2003–2004 FINA Swimming World Cup in Durban, South Africa—beating the short course South American record of Colombian Alejandro Bermudez that had stood since 1998 (4:16.74), with a time of 4:10.93.

In February 2004, in the last event of the 2003–2004 FINA Swimming World Cup, in Rio de Janeiro, he broke his own 55.41 second South American 100-meter individual medley record with a time of 54.95 seconds, and also broke the 200-meter individual medley record with a time of 1:58.16.

In March 2004, in the 37th South American Swimming Championships in Maldonado, Pereira won the gold medal in the 200-meter individual medley, beating the South American record with a time of 2:00.19 and earning an "A" designation in Brazil's Olympic classification. He also broke the South American record two more times, with times of 1:59.92 and 1:59.48, before competing in the 2004 Summer Olympics in Athens, becoming second in the world rankings.

In May 2004, Pereira broke Ricardo Prado's long-course South American record in the 400-meter individual medley, made at the 1984 Summer Olympics, which had been 4:18.45. Pereira swam for 4:17.62 and again obtained Brazil's Olympic classification.

=== 2004 Summer Olympics ===
For the first time, Thiago was ranked high enough among Brazilian athletes to compete in the 2004 Summer Olympics, where he finished fifth in the 200-meter individual medley and 17th in the 400-meter individual medley. In the 400-meter individual medley, his first Olympic event, Thiago was so anxious that he felt nauseous. His time was 4:22.06, almost five seconds slower than his South American record. He left the pool, gasping and unable speak, and subsequently vomited in the locker room. He did not reach the final, and later said, "I feel very bad". In the 200-meter individual medley, he swam close to his best time but did not beat it. The race pace was strong: Thiago would have had to break his personal best by about 0.7 seconds to win the bronze medal.

=== 2004–08 ===
In September 2004, at the José Finkel Trophy, he broke the short-course South American record in the 100-meter individual medley, with a time of 53.72 seconds, and the 400-meter individual medley record with a time of 4:09.10.

At the 2004 FINA World Swimming Championships (25 m) in Indianapolis, Pereira won the gold medal in the 200-meter individual medley with a time of 1:55.78, defeating Ryan Lochte and breaking the South American record. In the 4×100-meter freestyle, he won a silver medal and he also won two bronze medals in the 100-meter individual medley and 4×200-meter freestyle, beating the South American record with a time of 7:06.64.

In May 2005, Pereira dislocated the kneecap while playing soccer; his recovery took two months and did not participate in the 2005 World Aquatics Championships in Montreal.

At the 2005–2006 FINA Swimming World Cup in February 2006, Pereira broke the short-course South American record in the 100-meter individual medley with a time of 53.49 seconds.

At the 2006 FINA World Swimming Championships (25 m) in Shanghai, Pereira finished 5th in the 4×200-meter freestyle with teammates César Cielo, Lucas Salatta and Rodrigo Castro, beating the South American record with a time of 7:06.09. He also finished 15th in the 200-meter individual medley and 17th in the 200-meter freestyle.

At the 2006 Pan Pacific Swimming Championships in Victoria, British Columbia, Pereira won a bronze medal in the 400-meter individual medley. In heats, he broke his own South American record with a time of 4:16.86. He also finished 21st in the 200-meter freestyle and qualified for the 200-meter individual medley final in 8th place, but did not swim in the final.

In September 2006, at the Brazil Trophy, he broke his South American record in the 200-meter breaststroke with a time of 2:14.64.

In December 2006 at the Pan Pacific Swimming Championships, he beat his South American record by more than two seconds in the 400-meter individual medley with a time of 4:14.67.

At the 2007 World Aquatics Championships in Melbourne, Pereira finished 4th in the 200-meter individual medley, 8th in the 4×100-meter freestyle, 9th in the 4×100-meter medley, 11th in the 4×200-meter freestyle, 12th in the 100-meter backstroke, and was disqualified at the 400-meter individual medley. He broke the South American record in the 4×100-meter freestyle along with César Cielo, Nicolas Oliveira and Rodrigo Castro, with a time of 3:17.03. and in the 4×200-meter freestyle, with a time of 7:20.00, along with Rodrigo Castro, Nicolas Oliveira and Armando Negreiros.

Pereira broke the South American record in the 200-meter individual medley three in three months with times of 1:59.19 in February, 1:58.65 in March (Melbourne heats) and 1:58.64 in May.

In May 2007, he broke two South American records in long course: the 400-meter individual medley record with a time of 4:11.91 and the 200-meter breaststroke record with a time of 2:12.67, in both getting the Olympic index.

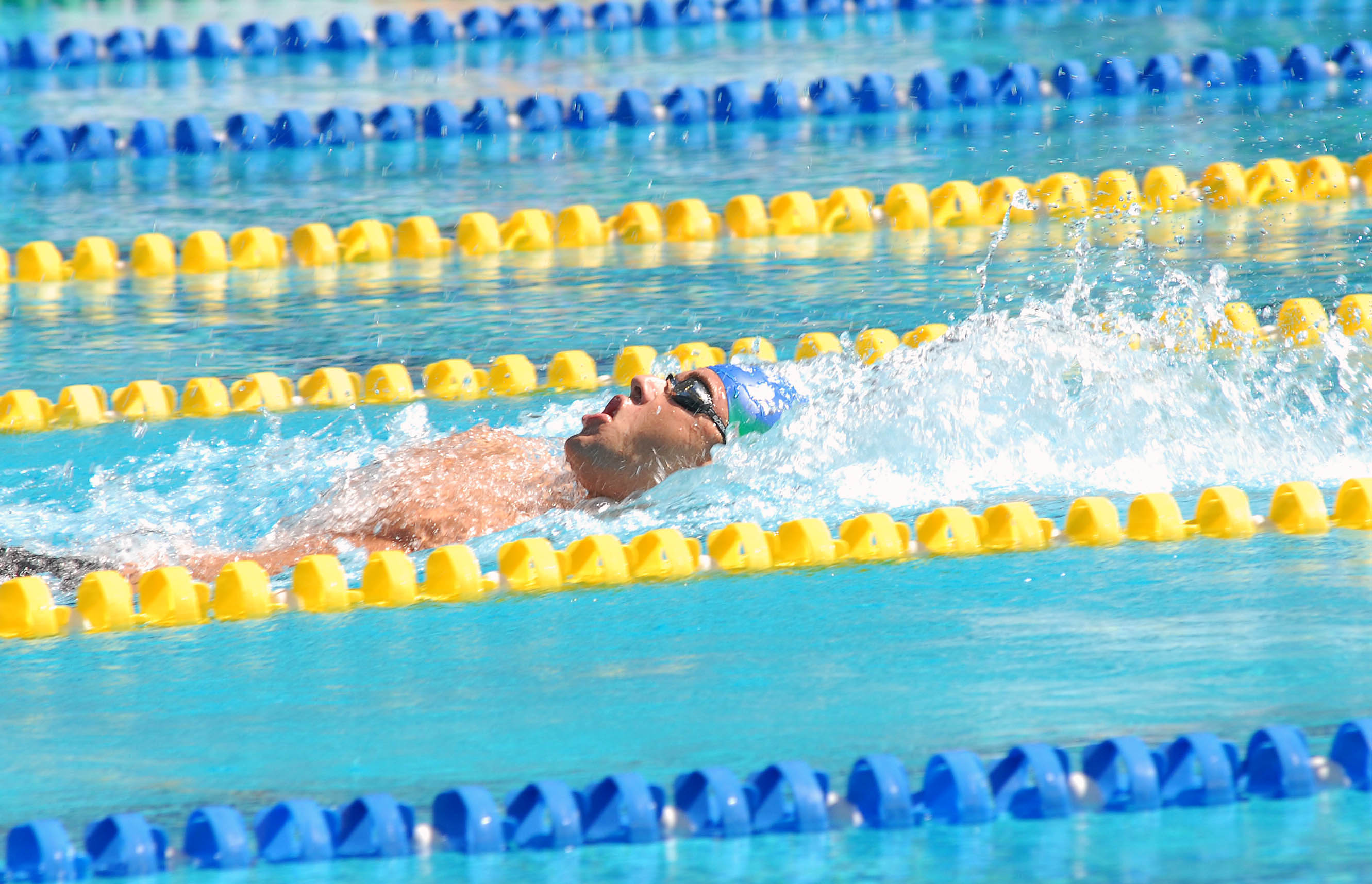
Thiago Pereira during 200-meter individual medley at Rio 2007

At the 2007 Pan American Games in Rio de Janeiro, Pereira won eight medals (six gold, one silver and one bronze) and became the winner of the most medals in a single edition of the Games, equaling the Costa Rican swimmer Silvia Poll—who won eight medals at 1987 in Indianapolis. Pereira also surpassed the five gold mark that belonged to Mark Spitz in the 1967 Pan Am Games in Winnipeg. Pereira won the gold medal in the 200-meter individual medley, 400-meter individual medley, 200-meter backstroke, 200-meter breaststroke, 4×200-meter freestyle, and 4×100-meter freestyle by participating in heats. He also won the silver medal in the 4×100-meter medley and bronze in the 100-meter backstroke. He broke the South American record in all events in which he competed, except the 200-meter breaststroke: in the 200-meter individual medley with a time of 1:57.79, in the 400-meter individual medley with a time of 4:11.14, in the 200-meter backstroke, with a time of 1:58.42; in 100-meter backstroke with a time of 54.75 seconds, in the 4×200-meter freestyle with a time of 7:12.27, and in the 4×100-meter medley with a time of 3:35.81.

At the 2007 FINA Swimming World Cup, Pereira made history. In the Stockholm stage, he broke the short-course South American record in the 100-meter individual medley, with a time of 52.97 seconds (his old record was 53.49 seconds from 2006), 200-meter individual medley, with a time of 1:55.08 (his old record was 1:55.78 from 2004) and the 400-meter individual medley record with a time of 4:06.30 (his old record was 4:09.10 from 2004). A few days later, in Berlin, Pereira broke the Americas record in the 100-meter individual medley in 52.42 seconds. In the 400-meter individual medley, he broke the Americas record and the Championship record, doing 4:00.63; within 26 hundredths of László Cseh's world record (4:00.37). In the 200-meter individual medley, Pereira won a gold medal with a time of 1:53.14, establishing a new World Record that stood until 13 December 2007.

=== 2008 Summer Olympics ===
At the 2008 Summer Olympics in Beijing, Pereira finished 4th in the 200-meter individual medley, 8th in the 400-meter individual medley, and 19th in the 200-meter breaststroke. In the 400-meter individual medley, he qualified for the final with a time of 4:11.74, almost beating his South American record. But in the final, his time was 4 seconds slower; Pereira said that he felt tired in the change from the butterfly to the backstroke, not achieving the same efficiency as in the heats. After this, Pereira left the 4×200-meter freestyle relay team of Brazil to compete in the 200-meter breaststroke. He broke the South American record with a time of 2:11.40. His best mark in the race was 2:12.60 but his performance was not enough to advance to the semifinals. In the 200-meter individual medley, he had very similar results in the heats, semifinals and finals, all near 1:58—failing to beat his record from the 2007 Pan American Games. Phelps won the gold with a time of 1:54.23, setting a world record. Cseh and Lochte swam at 1:56, winning silver and bronze.

=== 2008–12 ===
In March 2009, Pereira broke a bone in his left hand, which made him give up Travessia dos Fortes and compromised his training for that year's World Championships in Rome.

At the 2009 World Aquatics Championships in Rome, he finished 4th in the 200-meter individual medley, 4th in the 400-meter individual medley and 10th in the 4×200-meter freestyle. Pereira thrice broke the South American record in the 200-meter individual medley, in the heats (1:57.66), semifinal (1:57.35) and final (1:55.55), only 19 hundredths of a second away from winning a bronze medal and 31 hundredths away from winning a silver medal. In the 400-meter individual medley, Pereira broke his South American record by more than 2 seconds, with a time of 4:08.86, but he was still one second behind the medalists. In the 4×200-meter freestyle, he broke the South American record in the 200-meter freestyle with a time of 1:46.57, at the relay's opening, and the 4×200-meter freestyle record with a time of 7:09.71.

In September 2009, at the Jose Finkel Trophy, he broke the Brazilian record in the 200-meter backstroke with a time of 1:58.36.

At the 2010 South American Games in Medellín, Pereira won three gold medals in the 200-meter individual medley, 400-meter individual medley and 200-meter breaststroke. He also won three silver medals in the 200-meter backstroke, 4×100-meter and 4×200-meter freestyle.

At the 2010 Pan Pacific Swimming Championships in Irvine, Pereira won two bronze medals in the 200-meter individual medley and 400-meter individual medley.

At the 2010 FINA Swimming World Cup, Pereira was crowned by participation the king of the competition, winning a prize of US$100,000. He won, at all stages, the 400-meter individual medley race. He was the first Brazilian to reach the top of the competition, and was the swimmer who won more events in the same season in the history of the circuit During the tournament, he broke the South American record in the 100-meter individual medley with a time of 52.35 seconds, and in the 200-meter individual medley with a time of 1:52.72.

In May 2011, at the Maria Lenk Trophy, he broke the Brazilian record in the 200-meter backstroke with a time of 1:58.07.

At the 2011 World Aquatics Championships in Shanghai, he finished 6th in the 200-meter individual medley, 18th in the 100-meter backstroke, and dropped the 400-meter individual medley.

At the 2011 Pan American Games in Guadalajara, Pereira won six gold medals, one silver medal and one bronze medal. With these achievements, Pereira reached 12 gold medals in Pan American Games, becoming the Brazilian with the most gold medals in the history of the Pan American Games, beating Hugo Hoyama. He also became the second Brazilian in total number of medals in Pan American Games, behind Gustavo Borges, who won 19 medals. Pereira won gold in the 200-meter individual medley, 400-meter individual medley, 100-meter backstroke, 200-meter backstroke, and in the 4×100-meter freestyle and 4×100-meter medley by participating in heats. He also won the silver in the 4×200-meter freestyle, and the bronze in the 200-meter breaststroke. In this competition, he broke the Pan American Games record and the Brazilian record in the 200-meter backstroke with a time of 1:57.19.

=== 2012 Summer Olympics ===
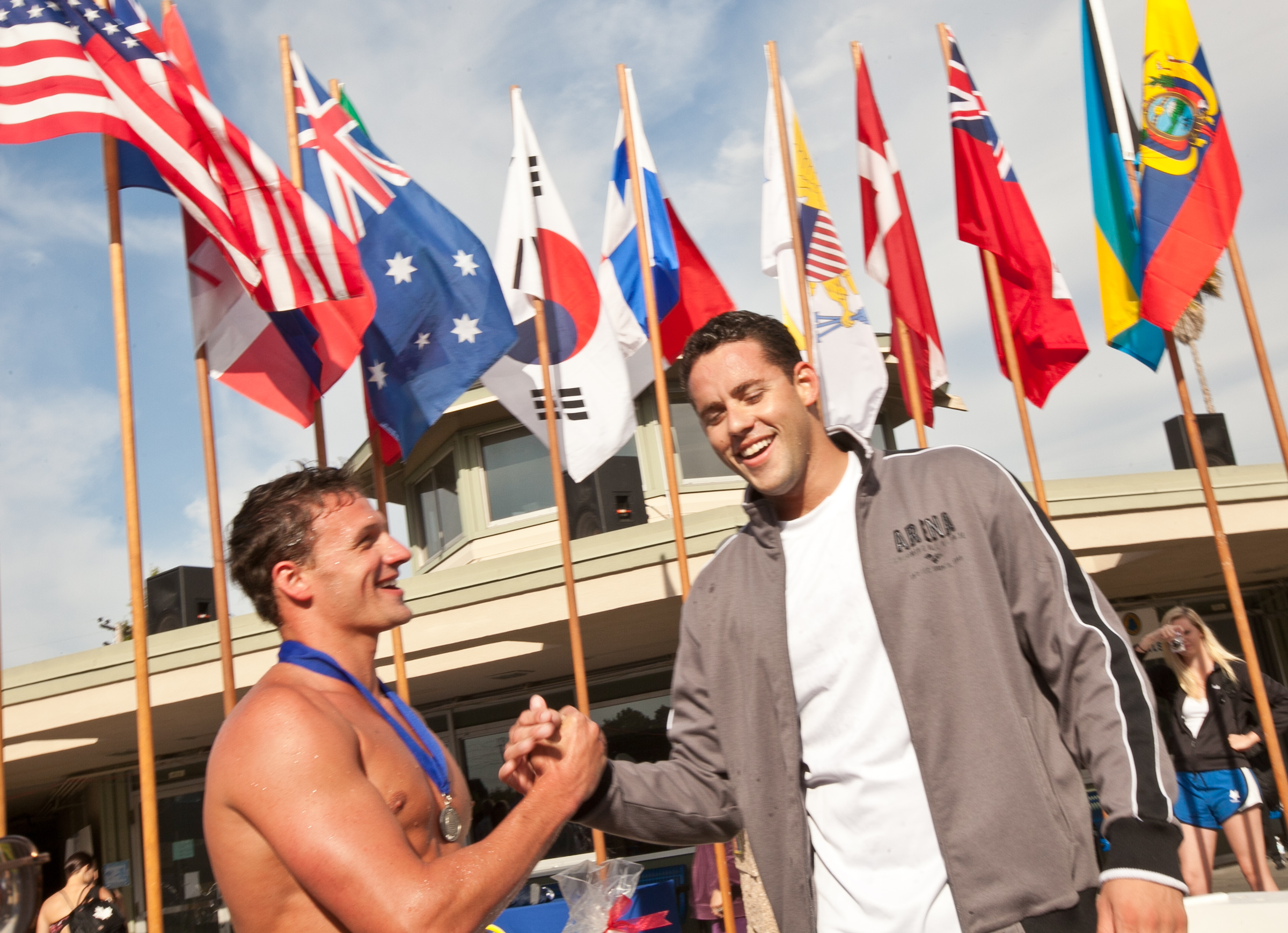
Ryan Lochte and Thiago Pereira, rivals throughout their careers

At the 2012 Summer Olympics in London, Pereira won the silver medal in the 400-meter individual medley, defeating Michael Phelps. He also finished 4th in the 200-meter individual medley, and 15th in the 4×100-meter medley. In the 400-meter individual medley, he equaled the South American record obtained with technological suits in 2009 with a time of 4:08.86. With this, he repeated the Ricardo Prado's feat at Los Angeles 1984. In the 200-meter individual medley, although he made his best-ever time without technological suits (1:56.74), Pereira was beaten in the last 25 meters by Hungarian László Cseh. Due to that, there was a repeat of the three medalists at Beijing 2008 in the 200m medley (Phelps, Lochte and Cseh).

=== 2012–16 ===
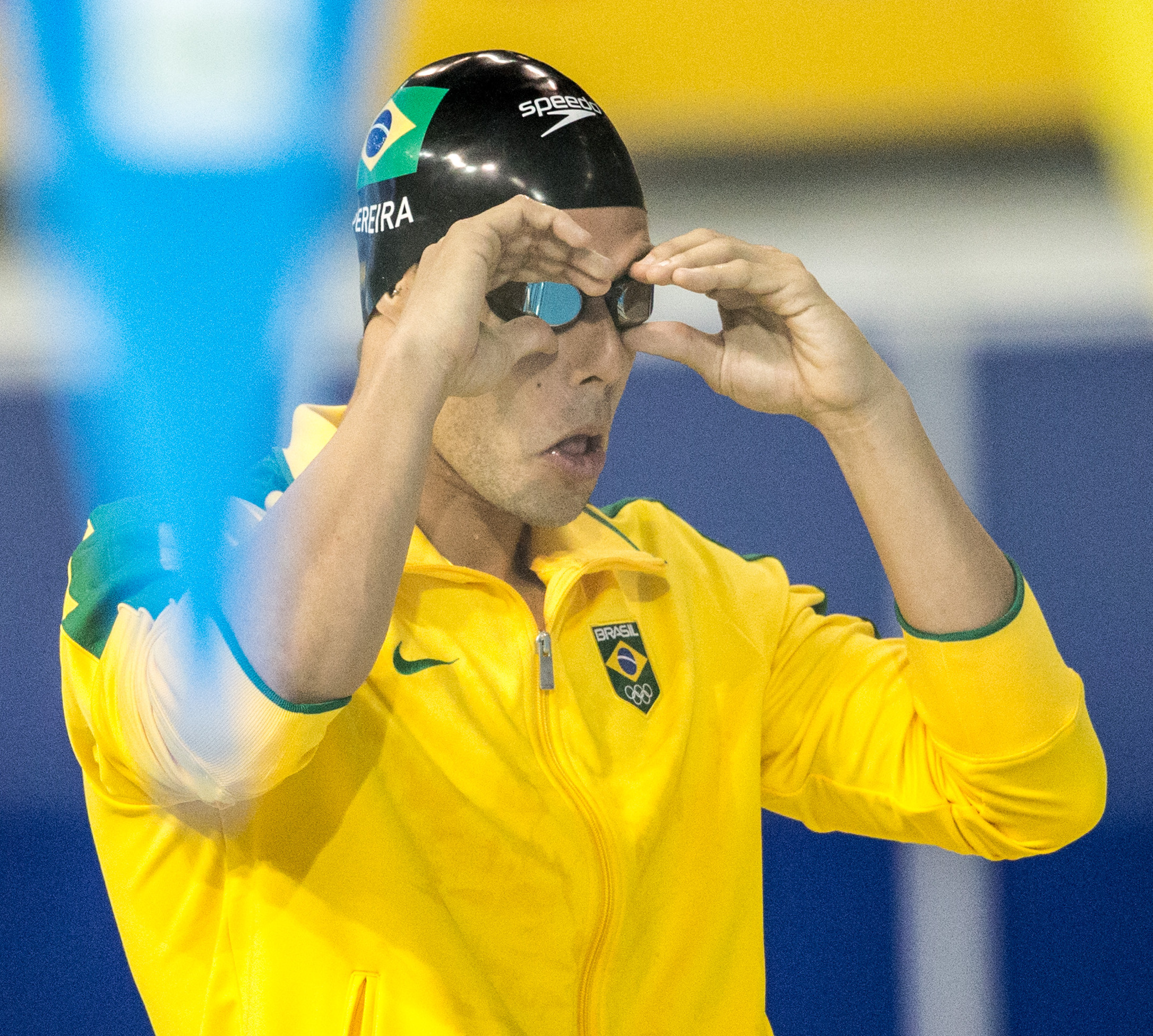
Thiago Pereira in the 400-meter individual medley at 2015 Pan Am Games

In August 2012, at the Jose Finkel Trophy, he broke the short-course South American record in the 200-meter individual medley, with a time of 1:52.30.

At the 2013 World Aquatics Championships, he won his first medal in World Championships, the bronze medal in the 200-meter individual medley, with a time of 1:56.30, his best time without super-suits. He was one hundredth to win the silver medal. Pereira also swam, for the first time in the World Championships, the 100-meter butterfly event, finishing in 15th place. Pereira had decided to forego the 400-meter individual medley despite being qualified for the race, but decided otherwise and entered the contest. Although he has not trained specifically for this race, he qualified for the final in eighth place, and by a few hundredths not left out. In the final, he won the bronze medal with a time of 4:09.48, his second medal at World Championships.

At the 2014 Pan Pacific Swimming Championships in Gold Coast, Queensland, Australia, Pereira finished 4th in the 4x100-metre medley relay, along with Guilherme Guido, Felipe França and Marcelo Chierighini, 4th in the 200-metre individual medley, 5th in the 100-metre butterfly, and 7th in the 100-metre backstroke.

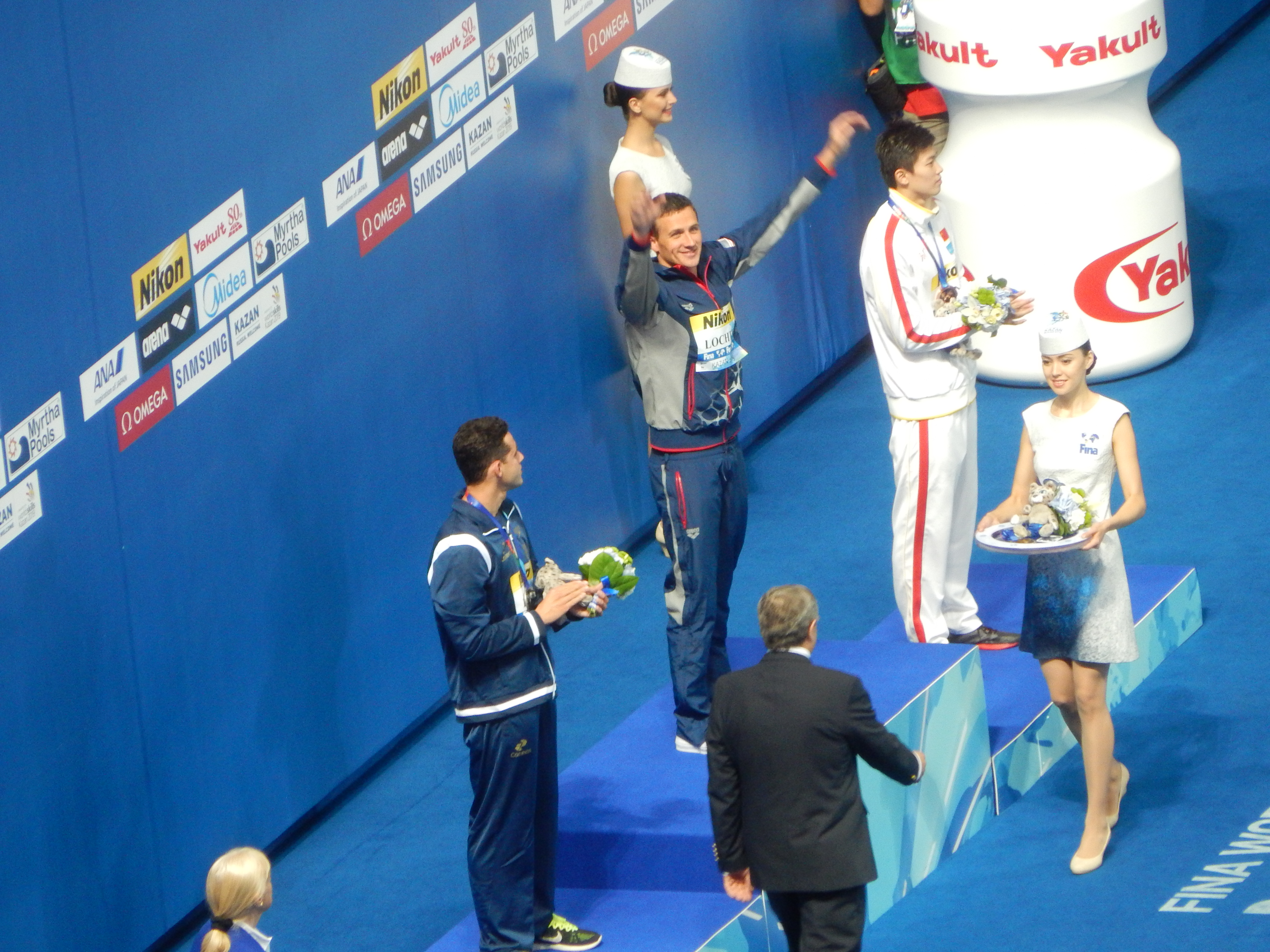
Thiago Pereira won the silver medal in the 200-meter individual medley at Kazan 2015

At the 2015 Pan American Games in Toronto, Ontario, Canada, Pereira won five medals, becoming the biggest medalist in the history of Pan American Games, surpassing the Cuban gymnast Erick Lopez, who has 22 medals between 1991 and 2003. He won a gold medal in the 4×200-metre freestyle relay, where he broke the Pan Am Games record with a time of 7:11.15, along with Luiz Altamir Melo, Nicolas Oliveira and João de Lucca. He also won more two gold medals in Brazilian relays by participating at heats, in the 4×100-metre freestyle relay, and in the 4×100-metre medley relay. He also won a silver medal in the 200 metre individual medley and bronze in the 200 metre breaststroke. In the 400 metre individual medley, Thiago Pereira initially won, which would make it his third consecutive title along with a record 22nd Pan American medal. However, the judges dictated Pereira failed to touch the wall with both hands at the same time on one of his breaststroke turns.

At the 2015 World Aquatics Championships in Kazan, in the Men's 200 metre individual medley, Pereira made his best participation in the World Championships, winning the silver medal with a time of 1:56.65, near his personal best. He also finished 15th in the Men's 4 × 200 metre freestyle relay, along with João de Lucca, Luiz Altamir Melo and Nicolas Oliveira.

=== 2016 Summer Olympics ===
At the 2016 Summer Olympics in his home country, Pereira made his 4th consecutive final in the 200 individual medley, finishing 7th.

=== Retirement from professional swimming ===
He retired from professional swimming in March 2017, at the age of 31.

== Honors and awards ==
Perira has received the following awards:

- World Male Swimmer of the Year, by Swimming World Magazine: 2007
- Prêmio Brasil Olímpico: 2007. In 2012 he was elected best swimmer of the year, and competed for the award along with gymnast Arthur Zanetti and boxer Esquiva Falcão; Zanetti was elected the winner. In 2004 he was elected the best swimmer.

== Career best times ==
Thiago Pereira is the current holder of the following records:

Race	Time	Date	Record	Pool
200m medley	1:55.55	30 July 2009	South American	Long Course
400m medley	4:08.86	2 August 2009	South American	Long Course
4x200 freestyle	7:09.71	31 July 2009	South American	Long Course
400m medley	4:00.63	17 November 2007	South American	Short Course

Thiago Pereira is the former holder of the following records:

Race	Time	Date	Record	Pool
200m freestyle	1:46.57	31 July 2009	South American	Long Course
200m breaststroke	2:11.40	12 August 2008	South American	Long Course
100m backstroke	54.75	22 July 2007	South American	Long Course
200m backstroke	1:57.19	21 October 2011	Brazilian	Long Course
200m backstroke	1:58.42	19 July 2007	South American	Long Course
4 × 100 m freestyle	3:17.03	25 March 2007	South American	Long Course
4 × 100 m medley	3:35.81	22 July 2007	South American	Long Course
100m medley	52.35	11 September 2010	South American	Short Course
200m medley	1:53.14	18 November 2007	World	Short Course
200m medley	1:52.30	24 August 2012	South American	Short Course
4 × 200 m freestyle	7:06.09	6 April 2006	South American	Short Course

== All records ==
=== Long course (50 meter pool) ===
- 200m medley

Time	Date	Notes
2:02.67	24 July 2003	SA
2:02.31	17 August 2003	SA
2:00.19	27 March 2004	SA
1:59.92	9 May 2004	SA
1:59.48	12 June 2004	SA
1:59.19	22 February 2007	SA
1:58.65	28 March 2007	SA
1:58.64	6 May 2007	SA
1:57.79	20 July 2007	SA
1:57.66	29 July 2009	SA
1:57.35	29 July 2009	SA
1:55.55	30 July 2009	SA

- 400m medley

Time	Date	Notes
4:17.62	6 May 2004	SA
4:16.86	18 August 2006	SA
4:14.67	16 December 2006	SA
4:11.91	3 May 2007	SA
4:11.14	17 July 2007	SA
4:08.86	2 August 2009	SA

- 200m breaststroke

Time	Date	Notes
2:15.63	25 September 2003	SA
2:14.64	6 September 2006	SA
2:12.67	3 May 2007	SA
2:11.40	12 August 2008	SA

- 200m backstroke

Time	Date	Notes
1:58.42	19 July 2007	SA
1:58.36	4 September 2009	NR
1:58.07	3 May 2011	NR
1:57.19	22 October 2011	NR

- 100m backstroke

Time	Date	Notes
54.75	22 July 2007	SA

- 200m freestyle

Time	Date	Notes
1:46.57 (r)	31 July 2009	SA

r = relay lead-off

- 4 × 200 m freestyle

Time	Date	Notes
7:20.00	30 March 2007	SA
7:12.27	17 July 2007	SA
7:09.71	31 July 2009	SA

- 4 × 100 m freestyle

Time	Date	Notes
3:17.03	25 March 2007	SA

- 4 × 100 m medley

Time	Date	Notes
3:35.81	22 July 2007	SA

=== Short course (25 meter pool) ===
- 200m medley

Time	Date	Notes
1:58.16	8 February 2004	SA
1:55.78	9 October 2004	SA
1:55.08	14 November 2007	SA
1:53.14	18 November 2007	WR
1:52.72	12 September 2010	SA
1:52.30	24 August 2012	SA

- 400m medley

Time	Date	Notes
4:10.93	7 December 2003	SA
4:09.10	9 September 2004	SA
4:06.30	13 November 2007	SA
4:00.63	17 November 2007	AM

- 100m medley

Time	Date	Notes
55.41	6 December 2003	SA
54.95	7 February 2004	SA
53.72	10 September 2004	SA
53.49	4 February 2006	SA
52.97	13 November 2007	SA
52.42	17 November 2007	AM
52.35	11 September 2010	SA

- 4 × 200 m freestyle

Time	Date	Notes
7:06.64	8 October 2004	SA
7:06.09	6 April 2006	SA

== See also ==
- World record progression 200 metres individual medley
- List of Olympic medalists in swimming (men)
- List of Americas records in swimming
- List of Pan American Games records in swimming
- List of South American records in swimming
- List of Brazilian records in swimming
- Swimming at the 2004 Summer Olympics
- Swimming at the 2008 Summer Olympics
- Swimming at the 2012 Summer Olympics

Records
Preceded by (United States) Ryan Lochte	World Record Holder; Men's 200 Individual Medley (25m); 18 November 2007 – 13 December 2007	Succeeded by (Hungary) László Cseh
Sporting positions
Preceded by (South Africa) Cameron van der Burgh	Male World Cup Overall Winner; 2010	Succeeded by (South Africa) Chad le Clos
Awards
Preceded by Giba	Brazilian Sportsman of the Year; 2007	Succeeded by César Cielo
Preceded by Flávia Saraiva	Brazilian Athlete of the Year (Fan's Choice); 2015	Succeeded by Rafaela Silva
