= Swimming at the 2007 World Aquatics Championships – Men's 100 metre butterfly =

Men's 100 metre butterfly at the 2007 FINA World Championships
- Venue: Rod Laver Arena
- Dates: 30 March 2007 (heats, semifinals); 31 March 2007 (final)
- Competitors: 123
- Winning time: 50.77

Medalists
gold medal	Michael Phelps	United States
silver medal	Ian Crocker	United States
bronze medal	Albert Subirats Altes	Venezuela

The men's 100 metre butterfly at the 2007 World Aquatics Championships took place on 30 March (heats, semifinals and a swim-off) and on the evening of 31 March (final) at Rod Laver Arena in Melbourne, Australia. 123 swimmers were entered in the event, of which 118 swam.

Existing records at the start of the event were:

- World record (WR): 50.40, Ian Crocker (USA), 30 July 2005 in Montreal, Canada.
- Championship record (CR): 50.40, Ian Crocker (USA), Montreal 2005 (30 July 2005)

== Results ==
=== Finals ===
Place	Name	Nationality	Time	Note
1	Michael Phelps	USA	50.77	
2	Ian Crocker	USA	50.82	
3	Albert Subirats Altes	Venezuela	51.82	
4	Lyndon Ferns	South Africa	52.03	
5	Andriy Serdinov	Ukraine	52.23	
6	Milorad Čavić	Serbia	52.53	
7	Nikolay Skvortsov	Russia	52.54	
8	Jason Dunford	Kenya	52.70	

=== Semifinals ===
Rank	Swimmer	Nation	Time	Note
1	Ian Crocker	USA	51.41	Q
2	Albert Subirats Altes	Venezuela	51.81	Q
3	Lyndon Ferns	South Africa	51.90	Q
4	Michael Phelps	USA	51.92	Q
5	Andriy Serdinov	Ukraine	52.11	Q
6	Milorad Čavić	Serbia	52.16	Q
7	Nikolay Skvortsov	Russia	52.22	Q
8	Jason Dunford	Kenya	52.26	Q-(swim-off)
9	Ryan Pini	Papua New Guinea	52.26	(swim-off)
10	Peter Mankoč	Slovenia	52.31	
11	Lars Frölander	Sweden	52.39	
12	Sergiy Breus	Ukraine	52.46	
13	Takashi Yamamoto	Japan	52.74	
14	Corney Swanepoel	New Zealand	52.94	
15	Andrew Lauterstein	Australia	52.99	
16	Yauheni Lazuka	Belarus	53.46	

==== Swim-off for 8th/Finals ====
1. Jason Dunford (Kenya) — 51.85 (Q)
2. Ryan Pini (Papua New Guinea) — 52.10

=== Heats ===
Rank	Heat / Lane	Name	Nationality	50m split	Time	Notes
1	H16-L4	Ian Crocker	USA	23.97	51.44	Q
2	H01-L5	Milorad Čavić	Serbia	23.42	51.70	Q
3	H15-L4	Michael Phelps	USA	24.92	51.95	Q
4	H14-L5	Albert Subirats Altes	Venezuela	24.05	52.15	Q
5	H15-L5	Lyndon Ferns	South Africa	24.01	52.26	Q
6	H14-L3	Ryan Pini	Papua New Guinea	24.25	52.27	Q
7	H16-L6	Peter Mankoč	Slovenia	24.24	52.30	Q
8	H13-L5	Lars Frölander	Sweden	24.53	52.34	Q
9	H16-L5	Andriy Serdinov	Ukraine	24.31	52.43	Q
10	H16-L1	Corney Swanepoel	New Zealand	24.28	52.46	Q
11	H15-L8	Andrew Lauterstein	Australia	24.80	52.63	Q
12	H14-L8	Sergiy Breus	Ukraine	24.33	52.64	Q
13	H16-L3	Takashi Yamamoto	Japan	24.56	52.69	Q
14	H13-L2	Jason Dunford	Kenya	24.38	52.76	Q
15	H14-L4	Nikolay Skvortsov	Russia	24.48	52.79	Q
16	H12-L7	Yauheni Lazuka	Belarus	24.42	53.10	Q
17	H16-L8	Gabriel Mangabeira	Brazil	24.99	53.16	
18	H14-L6	Amaury Leveaux	France	24.84	53.21	
19	H15-L6	Moss Burmester	New Zealand	25.01	53.28	
20	H15-L2	Adam Pine	Australia	25.21	53.33	
21	H12-L6	Octavio Alesi	Venezuela	24.63	53.41	
22	H14-L7	Evgeny Korotyshkin	Russia	25.01	53.47	
23	H15-L3	Ryo Takayasu	Japan	24.69	53.53	
24	H13-L3	Örn Arnarson	Iceland	24.59	53.54	
25	H15-L1	Fernando Silva	Brazil	24.90	53.55	
26	H14-L2	Sotirios Pastras	Greece	24.72	53.57	
27	H16-L2	Wang Dong	China	24.66	53.61	
28	H15-L7	Rudy Goldin	Italy	25.13	53.66	
29	H13-L1	Jakob Andkjær	Denmark	24.56	53.71	
30	H12-L2	Mario Todorović	Croatia	24.98	53.72	
31	H13-L6	Simão Morgado	Portugal	24.79	53.75	
32	H12-L1	Mathieu Fonteyn	Belgium	25.40	53.78	
33	H12-L3	Ioan Stefan Gherghel	Romania	25.26	53.86	
34	H11-L5	Rafael Muñoz Pérez	Spain	24.75	53.91	
35	H14-L1	Todd Cooper	Great Britain	25.08	54.00	
36	H10-L3	Guy Barnea	Israel	25.29	54.25	
37	H13-L4	Christophe Lebon	France	24.75	54.27	
38	H11-L4	Juan Veloz	Mexico	25.53	54.33	
39	H11-L2	Pablo Marmolejo	Mexico	25.36	54.34	
40	H12-L5	Jeremy Knowles	Bahamas	25.44	54.42	
41	H08-L3	Damien Courtois	Switzerland	24.68	54.44	
42	H10-L5	Jere Hård	Finland	24.90	54.52	
43	H11-L3	Camilo Becerra	Colombia	25.12	54.62	
44	H10-L7	Martin Verner	Czech Republic	25.28	54.72	
45	H12-L4	Michal Rubáček	Czech Republic	25.08	54.76	
46	H16-L7	Zhou Jiawei	China	25.75	54.85	
47	H13-L7	Dominik Straga	Croatia	25.15	54.90	
48	H10-L8	Oleg Lyashko	Uzbekistan	25.49	55.07	
49	H11-L8	Julio Galofre	Colombia	25.90	55.19	
50	H11-L1	Stanislav Kuzmin	Kazakhstan	25.45	55.23	
51	H11-L6	Paulius Andrijauskas	Lithuania	25.67	55.25	
52	H11-L7	Georgi Palazov	Bulgaria	25.00	55.29	
53	H09-L6	Gordon Touw Ngie Tjouw	Suriname	25.46	55.33	
54	H09-L4	Emilis Vaitkaitis	Lithuania	24.96	55.39	
55	H12-L8	Daniel Bego	Malaysia	25.88	55.41	
56	H09-L3	Ankur Poseria	India	25.76	55.51	
57	H09-L2	Romāns Miloslavskis	Latvia	25.58	55.54	
58	H09-L5	Wing Cheung Victor Wong	Macau	25.91	55.64	
59	H10-L6	Mathias Gydesen	Denmark	25.95	55.70	
60	H10-L1	Rustam Khudiyev	Kazakhstan	25.29	55.73	
61	H09-L1	Hamidreza Mobarrez	Iran	25.84	55.84	
62	H08-L8	Andy Wibowo	Indonesia	25.61	55.88	
63	H08-L2	Garth Tune	South Africa	25.52	56.02	
64	H07-L7	Adrien Perez	Switzerland	25.42	56.04	
65	H10-L4	Pavels Kondrahins	Latvia	25.39	56.08	
66	H09-L8	Jorge Arturo Arce Aita	Costa Rica	25.90	56.14	
67	H08-L7	Aleksander Hetland	Norway	25.70	56.23	
67	H08-L1	Emmanuel Crescimbeni	Peru	26.33	56.23	
69	H09-L7	Basil Kaaki	Lebanon	26.61	56.43	
70	H08-L5	Donny Budiarto Utomo	Indonesia	26.63	56.54	
71	H07-L4	Radonyos Matjiur	Thailand	26.98	56.84	
72	H07-L5	Miguel Navarro	Bolivia	26.72	57.00	
73	H07-L8	Roy Felipe Barahona Fuente	Honduras	26.78	57.34	
74	H07-L2	Xue-Wei Nicholas Tan	Singapore	26.83	57.40	
75	H08-L4	Arjun Muralidharan	India	26.50	57.46	
76	H08-L6	Nisic Nedim	Bosnia and Herzegovina	26.59	57.60	
77	H05-L6	Petr Romashkin	Uzbekistan	26.72	57.98	
78	H06-L7	Javier Hernandez Maradiaga	Honduras	27.20	58.00	
79	H06-L5	Tze Kang Ng	Singapore	27.10	58.02	
80	H07-L3	Bader Almuhana	Saudi Arabia	26.99	58.07	
81	H06-L3	João Matias	Angola	26.82	58.19	
82	H06-L2	Taki Mrabet	Tunisia	26.69	58.28	
83	H07-L1	Goksu Bicer	Turkey	26.02	58.36	
84	H05-L2	Jared Heine	Marshall Islands	27.35	58.50	
85	H06-L1	Carlos Eduardo Gil	Peru	27.32	58.62	
86	H04-L5	Khaly Ciss	Senegal	27.52	59.13	
87	H03-L4	Morgan Locke	(United States Virgin Islands) Virgin Islands	27.26	59.16	
87	H06-L6	Moustafa Al-Saleh	Syria	27.76	59.16	
89	H07-L6	Marco Camargo	Ecuador	27.31	59.29	
90	H04-L2	Alejandro Madde	Bolivia	28.16	59.64	
91	H04-L6	Nasir Ali	Pakistan	28.37	1:00.01	
92	H03-L3	Rama Vyombo	Kenya	27.91	1:00.27	
93	H05-L7	Sohaib Kalali	Syria	28.24	1:00.35	
94	H05-L3	Nuno Rola	Angola	27.98	1:00.59	
95	H04-L8	Erik Rajohnson	Madagascar	27.73	1:00.65	
96	H04-L3	Eros Qama	Albania	27.67	1:00.77	
97	H02-L6	Hamza Abdo	Palestine	27.91	1:00.98	
98	H06-L8	Miro Krestevski	Macedonia	28.16	1:01.04	
99	H05-L5	Bertrand Bristol	Seychelles	28.19	1:01.21	
100	H03-L2	Battushig Enkhtaivan	Mongolia	27.68	1:01.49	
101	H04-L4	Anas Hamadeh	Jordan	28.02	1:01.68	
102	H04-L7	Luke Hall	Eswatini	28.40	1:01.99	
103	H05-L4	Fernando Medrano Medina	Nicaragua	27.82	1:02.03	
104	H05-L8	Aleksey Klimenko	Kyrgyzstan	28.87	1:02.54	
105	H02-L2	Hernan Bonsembiante	Guam	28.04	1:02.62	
106	H03-L7	Hisham Fadhul	Bahrain	28.42	1:02.82	
107	H04-L1	Hong Nam Lei	Macau	29.29	1:03.00	
108	H03-L5	Richard Randranandraina	Madagascar	28.88	1:03.33	
109	H03-L8	Jean-Luc Augier	Saint Lucia	28.65	1:03.36	
110	H02-L3	Daryl Harford	Grenada	28.07	1:03.42	
111	H01-L4	Eric Chang	Malaysia	28.83	1:03.54	
112	H03-L1	Walid Nasib Hilal Alkaabi	United Arab Emirates	29.43	1:03.76	
113	H03-L6	Naji Askia Ferguson	Grenada	28.20	1:04.00	
114	H02-L4	Zane Jordan	Zambia	29.52	1:04.26	
115	H02-L5	Fadi Awesat	Palestine	29.24	1:05.04	
116	H02-L7	Eli Ebenezer Wong	Northern Mariana Islands	31.12	1:07.01	
117	H02-L1	Mohamed Sharif	Maldives	33.43	1:16.84	
--	H06-L4	Yellow Yeiyah	Nigeria		DQ	
--	H01-L3	Abdul-Fatawu Moro	Ghana		DNS	
--	H05-L1	Sunday Ayejo	Nigeria		DNS	
--	H10-L2	Jacinto Ayala	Dominican Republic		DNS	
--	H13-L8	Jernej Godec	Slovenia		DNS	

== See also ==
- Swimming at the 2005 World Aquatics Championships – Men's 100 metre butterfly
- Swimming at the 2008 Summer Olympics – Men's 100 metre butterfly
- Swimming at the 2009 World Aquatics Championships – Men's 100 metre butterfly
