= Swimming at the 2008 Summer Olympics – Men's 100 metre butterfly =

Men's 100 metre butterfly at the Games of the XXIX Olympiad
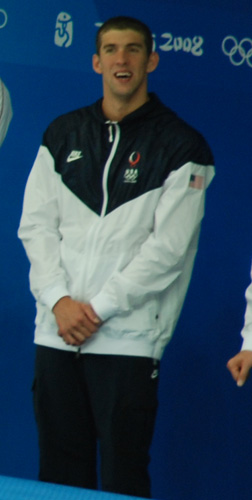
- Michael Phelps during the medal ceremony
- Venue: Beijing National Aquatics Center
- Dates: 14 August (heats); 15 August (semifinals); 16 August (final)
- Competitors: 66 from 51 nations
- Winning time: 50.58 OR

Medalists
| 1st place, gold medalist(s) | | Michael Phelps | United States |
| 2nd place, silver medalist(s) | | Milorad Čavić | Serbia |
| 3rd place, bronze medalist(s) | | Andrew Lauterstein | Australia |

The men's 100 metre butterfly event at the 2008 Olympic Games took place on 14–16 August at the Beijing National Aquatics Center in Beijing, China.

U.S. swimmer Michael Phelps set a new Olympic record of 50.58 to defend his title in the event, edging out Serbia's Milorad Čavić (50.59) by one hundredth of a second (0.01). He also earned his seventh Olympic gold at a single Games, tying Mark Spitz's 1972 record for the most gold medals. Australia's Andrew Lauterstein earned a bronze in 51.12, finishing in a close race against world record holder Ian Crocker by the slimmest margin. Phelps' triumph occurred after Čavić had remarked that it would be better for the sport if Phelps was defeated. Phelps' margin of triumph was so close that the Serbian team filed a protest, but after officials reviewed the video, the International Swimming Federation (FINA) announced that Phelps did touch the wall first and his victory would be upheld.

Kenya's Jason Dunford finished fifth with a time of 51.47, and was followed in the sixth spot by Japan's Takuro Fujii, in an Asian record of 51.50. Ukraine's Andriy Serdinov (51.59), the bronze medalist in Athens four years earlier, and Papua New Guinea's Ryan Pini, gold medalist at the 2006 Commonwealth Games, (51.86) closed out the field. Dunford and Pini also made history as the first swimmer for their respective nation to reach an Olympic final.

Out of five individual events from his Olympic program, Phelps did not break the current world record in a final, finishing 0.18 of a second behind Crocker's time of 50.40, set in 2005. In the entire event, other records were established, the Olympic record, five continental records, and several national records.

== Preview ==
Due to a combination of the venue, Beijing National Aquatics Center (better known as the Water Cube), which was claimed to be built to increase the speed of the swimmers, and the recently introduced LZR Racer swim suits, which had been proven to give the swimmer a lower time by 1.9 to 2.2%, some analysts were predicting that many fast times and world records would be set in all the swimming events.

As with almost every event that he entered in at the 2008 Summer Olympics, Michael Phelps was the favorite to win the men's 100 metre butterfly. Since winning the gold medal at the previous Games, in Athens, Phelps had demonstrated his superiority in this event, by also becoming world champion at the Melbourne 2007 World Championships, and achieving victory at the United States Olympic Trials. Therefore, the 100 metre butterfly was one of the eight Olympic events where Phelps was attempting to win a gold medal.

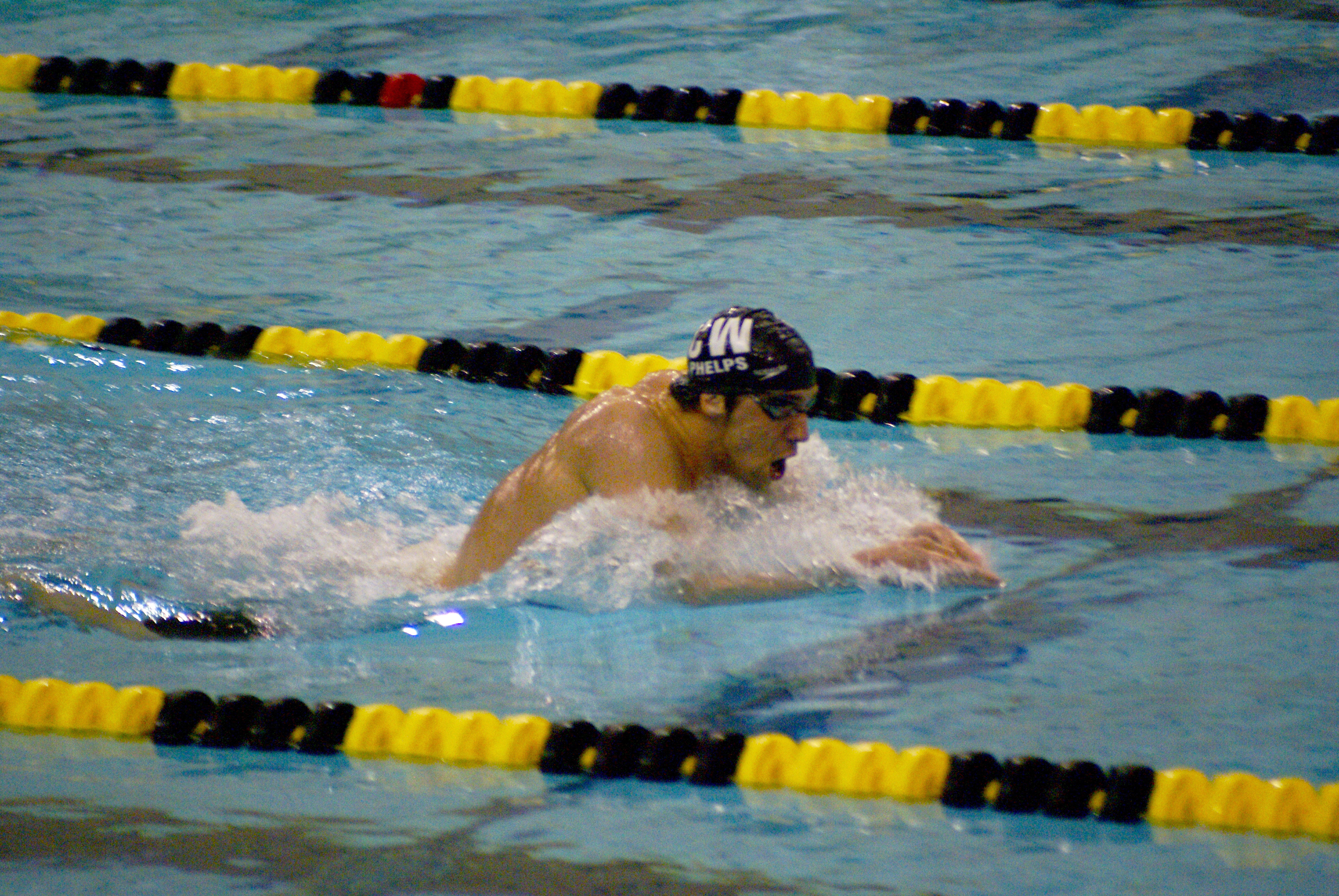
Michael Phelps, seen here in February 2008, was the heavy favorite to win the gold medal.

Going into the event, Phelps' compatriot Ian Crocker was seen as the swimmer with the best chance of beating Phelps. Crocker beat Phelps' 100 metre butterfly world record in 2003, and had since lowered it twice: once at the 2004 United States Olympic trials, and then at the 2005 World Championships in Montreal. Before the Olympics, Crocker and Phelps held the seventeen fastest times ever in the event. In 2004, Crocker was the favorite in the men's 100 metre butterfly, but lost to Phelps by four hundredths of a second. This victory gave Phelps the right to swim in the final of the 4 × 100 metre medley relay, however he gave up the spot to Crocker, and took his turn in the semifinals. Although holding the world record, Crocker had lost the last four times that he was up against Phelps in the 100 metre butterfly, including the 2008 United States Olympic Trials. Some thought that Crocker was not in the same shape that he was when we broke the world record, including Canadian Broadcasting Company (CBC) analyst Byron MacDonald who said that "If he's (Crocker) going to beat Phelps in Beijing, Crocker has to get close to his world record time of 50.40. He just hasn't shown it [he] can do it this year".

Another threat to Phelps' goal was Serbia's Milorad Čavić. In Athens 2004, Čavić was leading in a semifinal of the 100 metre butterfly, but right after his final turn, his suit opened at the neck and sucked in water, causing Čavić to finish last with a time of 53.12 seconds. At the 2008 European Championships, Čavić won the men's 50 metre butterfly and was the heavy favorite to win at twice that distance, but was suspended for wearing a "Kosovo is Serbia" T-shirt on the medal podium. American swimmer Gary Hall Jr. told The New York Times that although "Mike (Phelps) has been saying he's going to win the 100 fly at the Olympics for the last year", he thought that Čavić would be the winner.

Other possible medal contenders included Andriy Serdinov of Ukraine, who had won the Olympic bronze medal in 2004, and Venezuelan Albert Subriats, a bronze medalist at the 2007 World Championships and seen as a potential spoiler, if he could match or improve on his 51.82 time, in Beijing.

== Competition ==
=== Heats ===
The heats began on 14 August, at 19:57 local time (CST or UTC+8). There were nine preliminary heats, but all sixteen qualifiers came from the last five heats. Only three swimmers participated in the first heat, which was won by Andrejs Dūda of Latvia with a time of 55.20 seconds. Heats 2, 3, and 4 were won by Shaune Fraser (Cayman Islands), Rimvydas Šalčius (Lithuania), and Jakob Schioett Andkjaer (Denmark), respectively. Salcius, Jeremy Knowles (Bahamas), and Alon Mandel (Israel) all broke their countries' previous records, while in heat 4, Andkjaer, Michal Rubáček of the Czech Republic, Sotirios Pastras of Greece, and Ioan Stefan Gherghel of Romania also set new national records. South African Lyndon Ferns was the first swimmer to qualify for the semifinals, winning heat 5 with a time of 52.04 seconds, while national records were broken by Mario Todorović (Croatia), Simão Morgado (Portugal), and Douglas Lennox-Silva (Puerto Rico). Sergii Breus (Ukraine) and Shi Feng (China), finished first and second in heat 6, with times of 51.82 and 51.87 seconds, respectively, that allowed them to reach the semifinals. Five of the eight swimmers in heat 7 advanced as well, including Jason Dunford (Kenya), Andrew Lauterstein (Australia), Takuro Fujii (Japan), Frédérick Bousquet (France), and Ryan Pini (Papua New Guinea). Dunford, with a 51.14 time, set a new Olympic record, beating Phelps' previous record of 51.25 seconds, achieved in the final of the 100 metre butterfly in Athens; he also set new African and Kenyan records. Andrew Lauterstein's 51.37 time was a new Oceanic and Australian best. Takuro Fujii set a Japanese and an Asian record with his 51.50 time. The swimmers qualifying from heat 8 were Albert Subirats Altes (Venezuela), Corney Swanepoel (New Zealand), and Ian Crocker (United States). Records broken in this heat included the South American and Venezuelan records (by Altes), and the New Zealand record (by Swanepoel). Heat 9 was the fastest one, with Milorad Čavić (Serbia), Michael Phelps (United States), Andrii Serdinov (Ukraine), Peter Mankoč (Slovenia), and Kaio de Almeida (Brazil) all earning spots in the next round. Čavić, the heat's winner with a 50.76 time, beat the Olympic record set by Dunford two heats earlier, thus also setting a new European and Serbian record. Serdinov and Mankoč also managed to break their national records.

=== Semifinals ===
The semifinals were held on 15 August and started at 11:26 CST. The first semifinal was won by Michael Phelps with a time of 50.97 seconds. Other three swimmers qualified from this semifinal: Andrew Lauterstein (51.27 seconds), Jason Dunford (51.33 seconds), and Ryan Pini (51.62 seconds). Surprisingly, Albert Subirats Altes, the bronze medalist at the 2007 World Championships, failed to qualify, after finishing in the sixth place. Also missing the cut was the host nation's representative Shi Feng, Segii Breus, and Kaio de Almeida. The second semifinal was won in 50.92 seconds by Milorad Čavić, once again. The remaining three qualifiers were Ian Crocker (51.27 seconds), Andriy Serdinov (51.41 seconds), and Takuro Fujii (51.59 seconds). New time bests set in the semifinals included the Oceanic and Australian records (set by Lauterstein), and the Chinese record (set by Shi).

=== Final ===
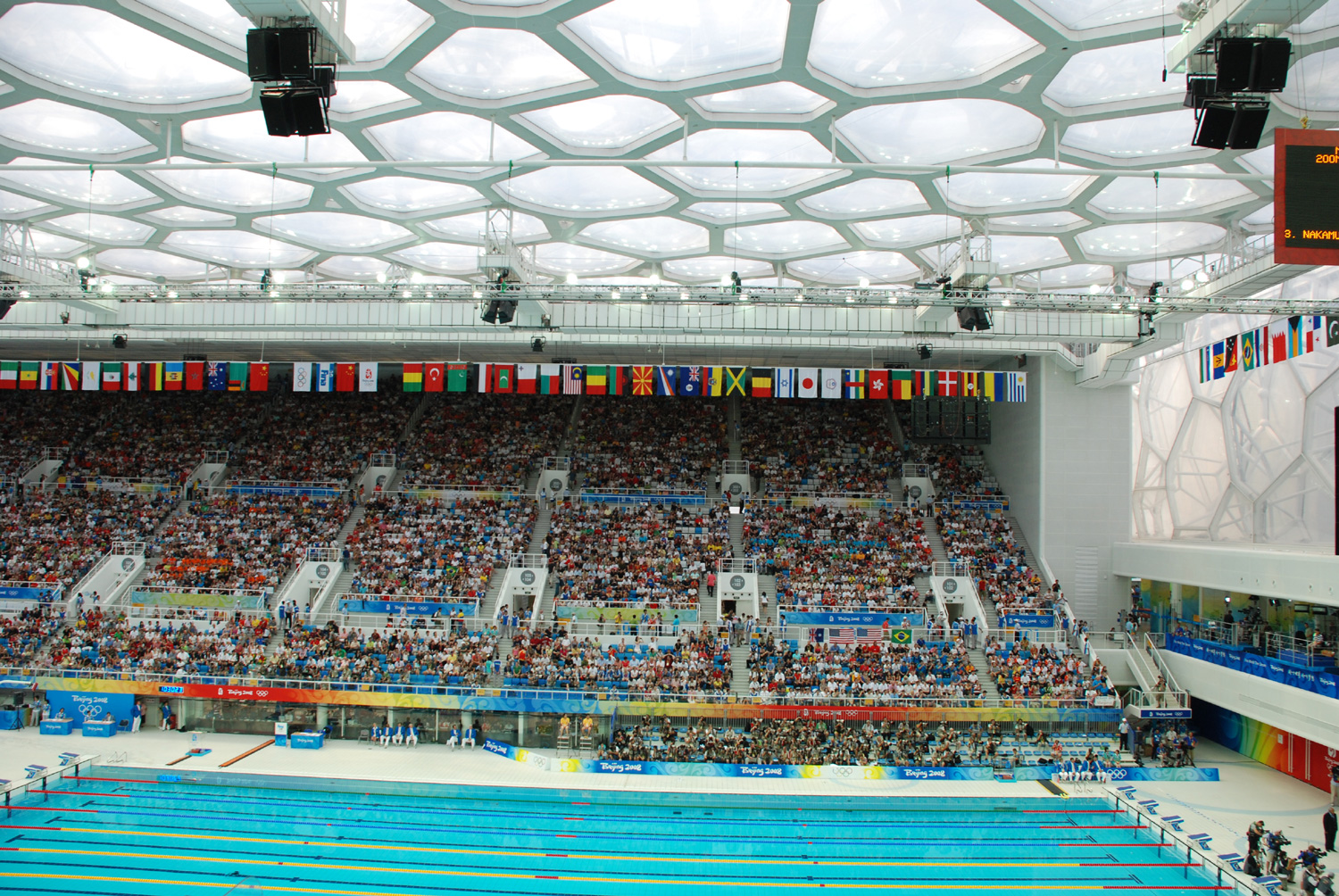
Crowds pack the Beijing National Aquatics Center on the morning of the final.

The final took place on 16 August, at 10:10 CST. Before the race, Milorad Čavić made headlines by saying in an interview that it would be better for swimming if he beat Phelps. Phelps' coach Bob Bowman used the quote to provide motivation to his protégé. In an interview, Phelps said that doubters like Čavić "fires me up more than anything, I always welcome comments. It definitely motivates me even more." Almost immediately after the race started, Čavić took the lead with Phelps getting off to a slow start. At the turn, Čavić was first, followed by Ian Crocker, while Phelps made the split in seventh place, just 0.62 seconds behind Čavić. As the two approached the finish, Čavić tried to coast to the wall on one last stroke, while Phelps, who had misjudged the end, took an extra half-stroke, causing both competitors to touch the wall at almost exactly the same time. It turned out that Phelps had actually finished one one-hundredth of a second ahead of Čavić, with a time of 50.58 seconds. Phelps even admitted that, at first, he thought the extra stroke he took had cost him the gold medal, until he looked at the scoreboard displaying the results. Andrew Lauterstein won the bronze medal, also beating Crocker by one one-hundredth of a second.

Several records were broken at the final. For the first time at the 2008 Summer Olympics, Phelps did not break the current world record in a final, finishing eighteen one-hundredths of a second behind team-mate Crocker's 50.40-second world record from 2005; he did though set a new Olympic record. Three continental records were broken in the final, with Fujii setting a new Asian record, Čavić a new European record, and Lauterstein a new Oceanic record. Although he finished last, swimmer Ryan Pini made history as the first swimmer from Papua New Guinea to swim in an Olympic final, and even received a call from the prime minister Michael Somare congratulating him. Most notably though, Phelps won his seventh gold medal at these Games, tying Mark Spitz's record for most gold medals won at a single Olympic Games. For being able to emulate Spitz's record, Speedo, a sponsor of Michael Phelps, awarded him a US$1 million bonus, which had already been offered to him at the 2004 Summer Olympics, under the same conditions. After the final, the National Broadcasting Company (NBC) arranged a joint interview with Phelps and Spitz, where Spitz praised Phelps' effort, telling him that "what you did tonight was epic" and even though at one point, Phelps was more than half a second behind Čavić, Spitz "never thought for one moment you (Phelps) were out of that race."

==== Protest ====
Almost immediately after the end of the race, the Serbian team filed a protest claiming that Čavić touched the wall first but did not use enough force to trigger the timing sensor. Officials of the International Swimming Federation (FINA) watched the video in slow motion, and announced that Phelps' victory would be upheld. Ben Ekumbo, a FINA referee announced that "It's very clear that the Serbian swimmer touched second after Michael Phelps." Although Serbia conceded their protest, not everyone was convinced that Phelps had won the gold medal; Branislav Jevtić, Serbia's deputy chef de mission for all sports, was quoted as saying "in my opinion, it's not right, but we must follow the rules. Everybody saw what happened." In one interview following the race, Čavić said "I am completely happy with where I am", while in another he revealed that he expects that "people will be bringing this up for years and saying you (Čavić) won that race. If we got to do this again, I would win it". While the result is still controversial, a high speed photograph shows Phelps touching the wall, while Čavić is still a short distance away. In April 2015, Mark Spitz said that he had been sent an email posted by Omega which stated that Phelps had lost the 100m butterfly final.

== Records ==
Prior to this competition, the existing world and Olympic records were as follows.

| World record | Ian Crocker (USA) | 50.40 | Montreal, Canada | 30 July 2005 |
| Olympic record | Michael Phelps (USA) | 51.25 | Athens, Greece | 16 August 2004 |

The following records were established during the competition:

| Date | Round | Name | Nationality | Time | Record | Ref |
|---|---|---|---|---|---|---|
| 14 August | Heat 7 | Jason Dunford | Kenya | 51.14 | OR | |
| 14 August | Heat 9 | Milorad Čavić | Serbia | 50.76 | OR | |
| 16 August | Final | Michael Phelps | United States | 50.58 | OR | |

== Results ==
=== Heats ===
Results from the heats
| Rank | Heat | Lane | Name | Nationality | Time | Notes |
|---|---|---|---|---|---|---|
| 1 | 9 | 5 | Milorad Čavić | Serbia | 50.76 | Q, OR, ER |
| 2 | 9 | 4 | Michael Phelps | United States | 50.87 | Q |
| 3 | 9 | 7 | Andriy Serdinov | Ukraine | 51.10 | Q, NR |
| 4 | 7 | 5 | Jason Dunford | Kenya | 51.14 | Q, AF |
| 5 | 9 | 2 | Peter Mankoč | Slovenia | 51.24 | Q, NR |
| 6 | 7 | 3 | Andrew Lauterstein | Australia | 51.37 | Q, OC |
| 7 | 7 | 7 | Takuro Fujii | Japan | 51.50 | Q, AS |
| 8 | 8 | 5 | Albert Subirats Altes | Venezuela | 51.71 | Q, NR |
| 9 | 8 | 1 | Corney Swanepoel | New Zealand | 51.78 | Q, NR |
| 10 | 6 | 2 | Sergiy Breus | Ukraine | 51.82 | Q |
| 11 | 7 | 4 | Frédérick Bousquet | France | 51.83 | Q |
| 12 | 6 | 8 | Shi Feng | China | 51.87 | Q |
| 13 | 8 | 4 | Ian Crocker | United States | 51.95 | Q |
| 14 | 7 | 2 | Ryan Pini | Papua New Guinea | 52.00 | Q, NR |
| 15 | 5 | 3 | Lyndon Ferns | South Africa | 52.04 | Q |
| 16 | 9 | 6 | Kaio de Almeida | Brazil | 52.05 | Q |
| 17 | 8 | 7 | Adam Pine | Australia | 52.07 | |
| 18 | 6 | 6 | Lars Frölander | Sweden | 52.15 | |
| 19 | 4 | 3 | Jakob Andkjaer | Denmark | 52.24 | |
| 20 | 5 | 5 | Mario Todorović | Croatia | 52.26 | NR |
| 20 | 7 | 1 | Nikolay Skvortsov | Russia | 52.26 | |
| 20 | 9 | 1 | Robin van Aggele | Netherlands | 52.26 | |
| 23 | 8 | 6 | Gabriel Mangabeira | Brazil | 52.28 | |
| 24 | 8 | 3 | Yevgeny Korotyshkin | Russia | 52.30 | |
| 25 | 4 | 4 | Sotirios Pastras | Greece | 52.41 | NR |
| 26 | 9 | 3 | Masayuki Kishida | Japan | 52.45 | |
| 27 | 6 | 4 | Michael Rock | Great Britain | 52.48 | |
| 28 | 4 | 6 | Ioan Gherghel | Romania | 52.50 | NR |
| 29 | 6 | 5 | Todd Cooper | Great Britain | 52.52 | |
| 30 | 8 | 2 | Rafael Muñoz | Spain | 52.53 | |
| 31 | 8 | 8 | Christophe Lebon | France | 52.56 | |
| 32 | 6 | 3 | Moss Burmester | New Zealand | 52.67 | |
| 33 | 5 | 1 | Simão Morgado | Portugal | 52.80 | NR |
| 34 | 3 | 2 | Rimvydas Šalčius | Lithuania | 52.90 | NR |
| 34 | 7 | 8 | Joe Bartoch | Canada | 52.90 | |
| 36 | 3 | 4 | Alon Mandel | Israel | 52.99 | NR |
| 37 | 5 | 2 | François Heersbrandt | Belgium | 53.33 | |
| 38 | 5 | 8 | Douglas Lennox-Silva | Puerto Rico | 53.34 | NR |
| 39 | 5 | 6 | Adam Sioui | Canada | 53.38 | |
| 40 | 5 | 4 | Ivan Lenđer | Serbia | 53.41 | |
| 41 | 9 | 8 | Benjamin Starke | Germany | 53.50 | |
| 42 | 4 | 1 | Michal Rubáček | Czech Republic | 53.53 | NR |
| 43 | 5 | 7 | Yevgeniy Lazuka | Belarus | 53.54 | |
| 44 | 7 | 6 | Thomas Rupprath | Germany | 53.56 | |
| 45 | 4 | 2 | Juan Veloz | Mexico | 53.58 | |
| 46 | 6 | 7 | Octavio Alesi | Venezuela | 53.58 | |
| 47 | 6 | 1 | Alexei Puninski | Croatia | 53.65 | |
| 48 | 4 | 8 | Ryan Gambin | Malta | 53.70 | |
| 49 | 3 | 3 | Jeremy Knowles | Bahamas | 53.72 | NR |
| 50 | 3 | 1 | Adam Madarassy | Hungary | 53.93 | |
| 51 | 2 | 5 | Shaune Fraser | Cayman Islands | 54.08 | |
| 52 | 3 | 8 | Hjortur Mar Reynisson | Iceland | 54.17 | |
| 53 | 3 | 7 | Camilo Becerra | Colombia | 54.27 | |
| 54 | 2 | 4 | Daniel Bego | Malaysia | 54.38 | |
| 55 | 2 | 2 | Gordon Touw Ngie Tjouw | Suriname | 54.54 | |
| 56 | 2 | 6 | Rustam Khudiyev | Kazakhstan | 54.62 | |
| 57 | 4 | 7 | Ankur Poseria | India | 54.74 | |
| 58 | 3 | 5 | Onur Uras | Turkey | 54.79 | |
| 59 | 1 | 3 | Andrejs Dūda | Latvia | 55.20 | |
| 60 | 3 | 6 | Georgi Palazov | Bulgaria | 55.25 | |
| 61 | 2 | 3 | Ahmed Nada | Egypt | 55.59 | |
| 61 | 2 | 1 | Bader Abdulrahman Almuhana | Saudi Arabia | 55.59 | |
| 63 | 1 | 4 | Luis Matias | Angola | 57.06 | |
| 64 | 2 | 7 | Nedim Nišić | Bosnia and Herzegovina | 57.16 | |
| 65 | 1 | 5 | Marco Camargo | Ecuador | 57.48 | |
| 66 | 4 | 5 | Mattia Nalesso | Italy | DNS | |

=== Semifinals ===
==== Semifinal 1 ====
Results from the first semifinal
| Rank | Lane | Name | Nationality | Time | Notes |
|---|---|---|---|---|---|
| 1 | 4 | Michael Phelps | United States | 50.97 | Q |
| 2 | 3 | Andrew Lauterstein | Australia | 51.27 | Q, OC |
| 3 | 5 | Jason Dunford | Kenya | 51.33 | Q |
| 4 | 1 | Ryan Pini | Papua New Guinea | 51.62 | Q, NR |
| 5 | 7 | Shi Feng | China | 51.68 | NR |
| 6 | 6 | Albert Subirats Altes | Venezuela | 51.82 | |
| 7 | 2 | Sergiy Breus | Ukraine | 52.05 | |
| 8 | 8 | Kaio de Almeida | Brazil | 52.32 | |

==== Semifinal 2 ====
Results from the second semifinal
| Rank | Lane | Name | Nationality | Time | Notes |
|---|---|---|---|---|---|
| 1 | 4 | Milorad Čavić | Serbia | 50.92 | Q |
| 2 | 1 | Ian Crocker | United States | 51.27 | Q |
| 3 | 5 | Andriy Serdinov | Ukraine | 51.41 | Q |
| 4 | 6 | Takuro Fujii | Japan | 51.59 | Q |
| 5 | 3 | Peter Mankoč | Slovenia | 51.80 | |
| 6 | 2 | Corney Swanepoel | New Zealand | 52.01 | |
| 7 | 8 | Lyndon Ferns | South Africa | 52.18 | |
| 8 | 7 | Frédérick Bousquet | France | 52.94 | |

=== Final ===
Results from the final
| Rank | Lane | Name | Nationality | Time | Notes |
|---|---|---|---|---|---|
| 1st place, gold medalist(s) | 5 | Michael Phelps | United States | 50.58 | OR |
| 2nd place, silver medalist(s) | 4 | Milorad Čavić | Serbia | 50.59 | ER |
| 3rd place, bronze medalist(s) | 3 | Andrew Lauterstein | Australia | 51.12 | OC |
| 4 | 6 | Ian Crocker | United States | 51.13 | |
| 5 | 2 | Jason Dunford | Kenya | 51.47 | |
| 6 | 1 | Takuro Fujii | Japan | 51.50 | AS |
| 7 | 7 | Andriy Serdinov | Ukraine | 51.59 | |
| 8 | 8 | Ryan Pini | Papua New Guinea | 51.86 | |
