= Swimming at the 2007 World Aquatics Championships – Men's 50 metre butterfly =

Men's 50 metre butterfly at the 2007 FINA World Championships
- Venue: Rod Laver Arena
- Dates: 25 March 2007 (heats, semifinals); 26 March 2007 (final)
- Competitors: 160
- Winning time: 23.18 seconds

Medalists
gold medal	Roland Schoeman	South Africa
silver medal	Ian Crocker	United States
bronze medal	Jakob Andkjær	Denmark

The men's 50 metre butterfly at the 2007 World Aquatics Championships took place on 25 March (heats, a swim-off, and semifinals) and on the evening of 26 March (final) at Rod Laver Arena in Melbourne, Australia. 160 swimmers were entered in the event, of which 152 swam.

Existing records at the start of the event were:

- World record (WR): 22.96, Roland Schoeman (South Africa), 25 July 2005 in Montreal, Canada.
- Championship record (CR): 22.96, Roland Schoeman (South Africa), Montreal 2005 (25 July 2005)

== Results ==
=== Final ===
Place	Lane	Swimmer	Country	Time	Notes
1	4	Roland Schoeman	South Africa	23.18	
2	5	Ian Crocker	USA	23.47	
3	8	Jakob Andkjær	Denmark	23.56	
4	6	Albert Subirats Altes	Venezuela	23.57	
5	3	Sergiy Breus	Ukraine	23.61	
6	1	Milorad Čavić	Serbia	23.70	
7	2	Lars Frölander	Sweden	23.86	
8	7	Peter Mankoč	Slovenia	24.14	

=== Semifinals ===
Rank	Heat/Lane	Swimmer	Country	Time	Note
1	S1-L4	Roland Schoeman	South Africa	23.18	Q
2	H2-L4	Ian Crocker	USA	23.42	Q
3	H2-L5	Sergiy Breus	Ukraine	23.53	Q
4	S1-L3	Albert Subirats Altes	Venezuela	23.59	Q
5	S1-L5	Lars Frölander	Sweden	23.82	Q
6	H2-L8	Peter Mankoč	Slovenia	23.91	Q
7	H2-L3	Milorad Čavić	Serbia	23.94	Q
8	S1-L6	Jakob Andkjær	Denmark	23.99	Q (swim-off)
8	S1-L1	Lyndon Ferns	South Africa	23.99	(swim-off)
10	H2-L1	Ryo Takayasu	Japan	24.03	
11	S1-L2	Matti Rajakylä	Finland	24.10	
11	S1-L7	Ryan Pini	Papua New Guinea	24.10	
13	H2-L6	Andriy Serdinov	Ukraine	24.12	
14	S1-L8	Jernej Godec	Slovenia	24.26	
15	H2-L7	Örn Arnarson	Iceland	24.34	
16	H2-L2	Matt Welsh	Australia	24.41	

A swim-off for 8th place should have occurred between Jakob Andkjær and Lyndon Ferns who tied for 8th at 23.99; however, results from a semifinal swim-off in the event are not on the OmegaTiming site, nor in the "complete" result page. Andkjær did advance to the finals, as he swam there, and Ferns did not.

=== Heats ===
Heat 1

Heat Rank	Lane	Swimmer	Country	Time	Overall Rank	Note
1	3	Milorad Čavić	Serbia	23.71	5	Q
2	8	Alois Patrice Kouadjo Dansou	Benin	27.79	112	
3	4	Eric Chang	Malaysia	27.90	114	
4	1	Raukura Waiti	Cook Islands	28.81	129	
5	7	Jamaal Sobers	Guyana	28.99	133	
6	6	Muwanguzi Myzafuru	Uganda	31.44	138	
7	5	Aimable Habimana	Rwanda	37.82	149	
--	2	Abdul-Fatawu Moro	Ghana	DNS	--	

Heat 2

Heat Rank	Lane	Swimmer	Country	Time	Overall Rank	Note
1	8	Itai Chammah	Israel	26.07	78	
2	6	Rahim Karmali	Uganda	32.09	140	
3	3	Ibrahim Areesh	Maldives	33.52	143	
4	5	Mohammed Al Qerbi	Yemen	33.97	144	
5	2	Mohamed Karsani	Sudan	34.14	145	
6	4	Aymard Lumuamu-Dimbu	Congo	34.32	147	
7	7	Giordan Harris	Marshall Islands	35.63	148	

Heat 3

Heat Rank	Lane	Swimmer	Country	Time	Overall Rank	Note
1	4	Hazem Tashkandi	Saudi Arabia	28.58	127	
2	3	Madudzi Fanuwakme Xaba	Eswatini	28.93	T131	
2	2	Nareth Sovan	Cambodia	28.93	T131	
4	5	Chakyl Camal	Mozambique	29.51	137	
5	6	Mohamed Sharif	Maldives	32.48	141	
6	1	Ashraf Ahmed	Sudan	34.30	146	
--	7	Stephenson Wallace	Saint Vincent and the Grenadines	DNS	--	
--	8	Aiglay Dangassat-Sissoulou	Congo	DNS	--	

Heat 4

Heat Rank	Lane	Swimmer	Country	Time	Overall Rank	Note
1	3	Hisham Fadhul	Bahrain	27.94	115	
2	6	Fadi Awesat	Palestine	28.16	120	
3	4	Hernan Bonsembiante	Guam	28.27	122	
4	5	Walid Nasib Hilal Alkaabi	United Arab Emirates	28.83	130	
5	7	Kerson Hadley	Federated States of Micronesia	29.03	134	
6	1	Carlos Shimizu	Guam	29.32	135	
7	2	Tony Augustine	Federated States of Micronesia	29.45	136	
8	8	Jamal Talib	Tanzania	32.87	142	

Heat 5

Heat Rank	Lane	Swimmer	Country	Time	Overall Rank	Note
1	2	Morgan Locke	(United States Virgin Islands) Virgin Islands	26.59	91	
2	3	Hamza Abdo	Palestine	27.77	111	
3	6	Heimanu Sichan	Tahiti	28.15	119	
4	1	Jean-Luc Augier	Saint Lucia	28.36	124	
5	8	Zane Jordan	Zambia	28.54	126	
6	7	Daryl Harford	Grenada	28.70	128	
7	4	Samson Makere	Tanzania	31.94	139	
--	5	Ibrahim Maliki Amadou	Niger	DNS	--	

Heat 6

Heat Rank	Lane	Swimmer	Country	Time	Overall Rank	Note
1	6	Khaly Ciss	Senegal	27.06	97	
2	5	Niall Roberts	Guyana	27.70	T109	
3	7	Battushig Enkhtaivan	Mongolia	27.89	113	
4	8	Bertrand Bristol	Seychelles	28.08	116	
5	1	Monder Al-Jabali	Libya	28.10	117	
6	4	Aleksey Klimenko	Kyrgyzstan	28.14	118	
7	3	Tural Abbasov	Azerbaijan	28.32	123	
8	2	Nasir Ali	Pakistan	28.39	125	

Heat 7

Heat Rank	Lane	Swimmer	Country	Time	Overall Rank	Note
1	8	Erik Rajohnson	Madagascar	26.68	92	
2	4	Yassir Abalalla	Bolivia	27.09	98	
3	3	Jonathan Calderon	Saint Lucia	27.16	101	
4	7	Leonel dos Santos Matonse	Mozambique	27.41	104	
5	5	Luke Hall	Eswatini	27.47	105	
6	6	Naji Askia Ferguson	Grenada	27.55	107	
7	2	Marco Camargo Gonzalez	Ecuador	27.66	108	
8	1	Jamie Zammitt	Gibraltar	28.17	121	

Heat 8

Heat Rank	Lane	Swimmer	Country	Time	Overall Rank	Note
1	5	Xue-Wei Nicholas Tan	Singapore	26.39	89	
2	4	Javier Hernandez Maradiaga	Honduras	26.75	93	
3	2	Jared Heine	Marshall Islands	27.02	96	
4	6	Manuel Alonso Yabar-Davila	Peru	27.12	99	
5	3	Fernando Medrano Medina	Nicaragua	27.34	102	
6	7	Hong Nam Lei	Macau	27.39	103	
7	1	Richard Randrianandraina	Madagascar	27.70	T109	
--	8	Essossimana Awizoba	Togo	DNS	--	

Heat 9

Heat Rank	Lane	Swimmer	Country	Time	Overall Rank	Note
1	8	Jose Emmanuel Crescimbeni	Peru	25.99	74	
2	7	Zhirong Bryan Tay	Singapore	26.00	75	
3	4	Jose Enmanual Lobo Martinez	Paraguay	26.19	T81	
4	6	Taki Mrabet	Tunisia	26.34	86	
5	2	Roy Felipe Barahona Fuente	Honduras	26.36	T87	
6	5	Ahmed Salamoun	Qatar	27.50	106	
--	1	Jules Yao Bessan	Benin	DNS	--	
--	3	João Aguiar	Angola	DNS	--	

Heat 10

Heat Rank	Lane	Swimmer	Country	Time	Overall Rank	Note
1	3	Dinko Jukić	Austria	25.11	54	
2	4	Ankur Poseria	India	25.13	56	
3	8	Basil Kaaki	Lebanon	25.62	66	
4	6	Miguel Navarro	Bolivia	26.10	79	
5	5	Evgenii Petrashov	Kyrgyzstan	26.19	T81	
6	7	Rama Vyombo	Kenya	26.32	85	
7	2	João Matias	Angola	26.86	94	
8	1	Anas Hamadeh	Jordan	27.14	100	

Heat 11

Heat Rank	Lane	Swimmer	Country	Time	Overall Rank	Note
1	4	Virdhawal Khade	India	25.28	59	
2	6	Romāns Miloslavskis	Latvia	25.47	T63	
3	3	Norbert Trandafir	Romania	25.66	68	
4	8	Bader Almuhana	Saudi Arabia	26.04	76	
5	5	Donny Budiarto Utomo	Indonesia	26.30	84	
6	1	Nisic Nedim	Bosnia and Herzegovina	26.36	T87	
7	7	Marc Pascal Pierre Dansou	Benin	26.89	95	
--	2	Sunday Ayejo	Nigeria	DNS	--	

Heat 12

Heat Rank	Lane	Swimmer	Country	Time	Overall Rank	Note
1	2	Gordon Touw Ngie Tjouw	Suriname	24.90	49	NR
2	6	Wing Cheung Victor Wong	Macau	25.22	58	
3	3	Alexandre Bakhtiarov	Cyprus	25.47	T63	
4	4	Hamidreza Mobarrez	Iran	25.71	69	
5	5	Yellow Yeiyah	Nigeria	26.05	77	
6	8	Julio Galofre	Colombia	26.16	80	
7	7	Maximiliano Schnettler	Chile	26.24	83	
8	1	Wei Wen Wang	Chinese Taipei	26.51	90	

Heat 13

Heat Rank	Lane	Swimmer	Country	Time	Overall Rank	Note
1	1	Jacinto Ayala	Dominican Republic	24.81	45	
2	7	Gabriel Melconian	Uruguay	25.43	61	
3	5	Georgi Palazov	Bulgaria	25.44	62	
4	2	Martin Liivamägi	Estonia	25.47	63	
5	3	Daniel Bego	Malaysia	25.82	70	
6	6	Martin Kutscher Belgeri	Uruguay	25.83	71	
7	4	Jorge Arturo Arce Aita	Costa Rica	25.98	72	
7	8	Goksu Bicer	Turkey	25.98	72	

Heat 14

Heat Rank	Lane	Swimmer	Country	Time	Overall Rank	Note
1	4	Jason Dunford	Kenya	24.41	T26	
2	5	Mathias Stenderup Gydesen	Denmark	24.72	38	
3	3	Emilis Vaitkaitis	Lithuania	24.74	T39	
4	6	Guy Marcus Barnea	Israel	24.77	41	
5	7	Davis Tarwater	USA	24.83	48	
6	2	Adrien Perez	Switzerland	25.20	57	
7	8	Oleg Lyashko	Uzbekistan	25.31	60	
--	1	Stanislav Kuzmin	Kazakhstan	DNS	--	

Heat 15

Heat Rank	Lane	Swimmer	Country	Time	Overall Rank	Note
1	4	Damien Courtois	Switzerland	24.39	25	
2	6	Apostolos Tsagkarakis	Greece	24.58	T34	
3	1	Camilo Becerra	Colombia	24.74	T39	
4	5	Martin Verner	Czech Republic	24.78	42	
5	8	Jeremy Knowles	Bahamas	24.98	51	
6	7	Andy Wibowo	Indonesia	25.00	52	
7	3	Pavels Kondrahins	Latvia	25.12	55	
8	2	Ravil Nachaev	Uzbekistan	25.65	67	

Heat 16

Heat Rank	Lane	Swimmer	Country	Time	Overall Rank	Note
1	4	Peter Mankoč	Slovenia	24.06	T16	swim-off
2	1	Moss Burmester	New Zealand	24.55	33	
3	3	Adam Pine	Australia	24.60	36	
4	6	Dominik Straga	Croatia	24.80	43	
4	7	Paweł Korzeniowski	Poland	24.80	43	
6	2	Yauheni Lazuka	Belarus	24.82	T46	
7	8	Rustam Khudiyev	Kazakhstan	24.92	50	
8	5	Fernando Silva	Brazil	25.01	53	

Heat 17

Heat Rank	Lane	Swimmer	Country	Time	Overall Rank	Note
1	3	Örn Arnarson	Iceland	24.02	T12	Q NR
2	6	Jere Hård	Finland	24.18	19	
3	2	Mario Todorović	Croatia	24.41	T26	
4	8	Octavio Alesi	Venezuela	24.48	30	
5	4	WANG Dong	China	24.50	31	
6	1	Rudy Goldin	Italy	24.50	32	
7	5	Takashi Yamamoto	Japan	24.58	T34	
8	7	Sotirios Pastras	Greece	24.82	T46	

Heat 18

Heat Rank	Lane	Swimmer	Country	Time	Overall Rank	Note
1	6	Ian Crocker	USA	23.30	1	Q
2	5	Andriy Serdinov	Ukraine	23.92	7	Q
3	4	Matt Welsh	Australia	23.95	9	Q
4	1	Thomas Rupprath	Germany	24.06	T16	swim-off
5	8	Nikolay Skvortsov	Russia	24.23	22	
6	7	Simão Morgado	Portugal	24.44	29	
7	2	Todd Cooper	(United Kingdom) Great Britain	24.61	37	
--	3	César Cielo	Brazil	DNS	--	

Heat 19

Heat Rank	Lane	Swimmer	Country	Time	Overall Rank	Note
1	4	Sergiy Breus	Ukraine	23.61	3	Q
2	1	Albert Subirats Altes	Venezuela	23.73	6	Q
3	5	Matti Rajakylä	Finland	23.98	10	Q
4	2	Ryan Pini	Papua New Guinea	24.02	T12	Q
4	6	Ryo Takayasu	Japan	24.02	T12	Q
6	8	Rafael Muñoz Pérez	Spain	24.21	21	
7	7	Evgeny Korotyshkin	Russia	24.36	24	
8	3	ZHOU Jiawei	China	24.41	T26	

Heat 20

Heat Rank	Lane	Swimmer	Country	Time	Overall Rank	Note
1	4	Roland Schoeman	South Africa	23.49	2	Q
2	1	Lars Frölander	Sweden	23.66	4	Q
3	7	Jakob Andkjær	Denmark	23.92	7	Q
4	3	Frédérick Bousquet	France	24.00	11	Q (scratched semis)
5	6	Lyndon Ferns	South Africa	24.05	15	Q
6	7	Jernej Godec	Slovenia	24.06	T16	swim-off
7	2	Corney Swanepoel	New Zealand	24.20	20	
8	8	Benjamin Starke	Germany	24.25	23	

=== Swim-off for 16th place ===
Following the conclusion of the preliminary heats there was a three-way tie in for 16th at 24.06 between Germany's Thomas Rupprath, and Slovenia's two entries in the event: Peter Mankoč and Jernej Godec.

- 1 Jernej Godec, Slovenia – 23.74 (Q)
- 1 Peter Mankoč, Slovenia – 23.74 (Q)
- 3 Thomas Rupprath, Germany – 23.90

As France's Frédérick Bousquet scratched the final, a swim-off to the swim-off tie was not need, and both Godec and Mankoč advanced to the semifinals.

== See also ==
- Swimming at the 2005 World Aquatics Championships – Men's 50 metre butterfly
- Swimming at the 2009 World Aquatics Championships – Men's 50 metre butterfly
