= Škacha =

Škacha, or Škácha, is a Czech surname. Notable people with the surnames include:

- Martin Škacha (born 1983), Czech swimmer
- Oldřich Škácha (1941–2014), Czech photographer and anti-communist dissident
