= Serbia at the 2008 Summer Olympics =

- IOC code: SRB
- NOC: Olympic Committee of Serbia
- Website: www.oks.org.rs (in Serbian)

in Beijing
- Competitors: 92 in 11 sports
- Flag bearers: Jasna Šekarić (opening); Saša Starović (closing)
- Officials: Snežana Lakićević-Stojačić
- Medals Ranked 61st: Gold 0 Silver 1 Bronze 2 Total 3

Summer Olympics appearances (overview)
- 1912; 1920–2004; 2008; 2012; 2016; 2020; 2024

Other related appearances
- Yugoslavia (1920–1992 W); Independent Olympic Participants (1992 S); Serbia and Montenegro (1996–2006)

Serbia competed at the 2008 Summer Olympics in Beijing, People's Republic of China. The country returned under the name Serbia after 96 years, previously competing under the names Yugoslavia (1920–1988), Independent Olympic Participants (1992), Yugoslavia (1996–2002) and Serbia and Montenegro (2004–2006).

The flag on the opening ceremony was held by shooter Jasna Šekarić, who has won five medals in her five previous Olympic appearances.

== Medalists ==
Medal	Name	Sport	Event
Silver	Milorad Čavić	Swimming	Men's 100 m butterfly
Bronze	Novak Djokovic	Tennis	Men's singles
Bronze	Serbia men's national water polo team: Denis Šefik; Andrija Prlainović; Živko Gocić; Vanja Udovičić; Dejan Savić; Duško Pijetlović; Nikola Rađen; Filip Filipović; Aleksandar Ćirić; Aleksandar Šapić; Vladimir Vujasinović; Branko Peković; Slobodan Soro	Water polo	Men's tournament

== Athletics ==
Key

- Note–Ranks given for track events are within the athlete's heat only
- Q = Qualified for the next round
- q = Qualified for the next round as a fastest loser or, in field events, by position without achieving the qualifying target
- NR = National record
- N/A = Round not applicable for the event
- Bye = Athlete not required to compete in round

Men
Track & road events

Athlete	Event	Heat		Semifinal		Final	
Athlete	Event	Result	Rank	Result	Rank	Result	Rank
Nenad Filipović	50 km walk	—				4:02:16	30
Predrag Filipović	20 km walk	—				1:28:15	41
Goran Nava	1500 m	3:42.92	6	Did not advance			

Field events

Athlete	Event	Qualification		Final	
Athlete	Event	Distance	Position	Distance	Position
Asmir Kolašinac	Shot put	19.01	33	Did not advance	
Dragutin Topić	High jump	2.25	17	Did not advance	

Women
Track & road events

Athlete	Event	Final	
Athlete	Event	Result	Rank
Olivera Jevtić	Marathon	DNF	

Field events

Athlete	Event	Qualification		Final	
Athlete	Event	Distance	Position	Distance	Position
Tatjana Jelača	Javelin throw	NM	—	Did not advance	
Ivana Španović	Long jump	6.30	31	Did not advance	
Dragana Tomašević	Discus throw	60.19	13	Did not advance	
Biljana Topić	Triple jump	14.14	13	Did not advance	

== Cycling ==
=== Road ===
Athlete	Event	Time	Rank
Ivan Stević	Men's road race	6:35:44	67
Nebojša Jovanović	Men's road race	6:49:59	85

== Football ==
=== Men's tournament ===
Roster

The following is the Serbia squad in the men's football tournament of the 2008 Summer Olympics.

Head coach: Miroslav Đukić

No.	Pos.	Player	Date of birth (age)	Caps	Goals	Club
1	GK	Vladimir Stojković* (c)	28 July 1983 (aged 25)	25	0	(Portugal) Sporting CP
2	DF	Marko Jovanović	26 March 1988 (aged 20)	2	0	(Serbia) Partizan
3	DF	Aleksandar Kolarov	10 November 1985 (aged 22)	12	2	(Italy) Lazio
4	MF	Gojko Kačar	26 January 1987 (aged 21)	17	0	(Germany) Hertha BSC
5	DF	Slobodan Rajković	3 February 1989 (aged 19)	15	0	(Netherlands) Twente
6	MF	Predrag Pavlović	19 June 1986 (aged 22)	4	0	(Serbia) Napredak Kruševac
7	MF	Milan Smiljanić	19 November 1986 (aged 21)	18	1	(Spain) Espanyol
8	MF	Nikola Gulan	23 March 1989 (aged 19)	6	0	(Italy) Fiorentina
9	FW	Đorđe Rakić	31 October 1985 (aged 22)	18	2	(Austria) Red Bull Salzburg
11	DF	Duško Tošić	19 January 1985 (aged 23)	23	1	(Germany) Werder Bremen
12	FW	Dušan Tadić	20 November 1988 (aged 19)	6	0	(Serbia) Vojvodina
13	MF	Ljubomir Fejsa	14 August 1988 (aged 19)	4	0	(Serbia) Partizan
14	FW	Miljan Mrdaković*	9 May 1982 (aged 26)	0	0	(Portugal) Vitória de Guimarães
15	MF	Aleksandar Živković*	28 July 1977 (aged 31)	6	0	(China) Shandong Luneng
16	DF	Nenad Tomović	30 August 1987 (aged 20)	2	0	(Serbia) Red Star Belgrade
17	MF	Zoran Tošić	28 April 1987 (aged 21)	14	1	(Serbia) Partizan
18	GK	Saša Stamenković	5 January 1985 (aged 23)	0	0	(Serbia) Napredak Kruševac
19	FW	Andrija Kaluđerović	5 July 1987 (aged 21)	4	0	(Serbia) OFK Beograd

* Over-aged player.

Group play

Pos	Team	Pld	W	D	L	GF	GA	GD	Pts	Qualification
1	Argentina	3	3	0	0	5	1	+4	9	Qualified for the quarterfinals
2	Ivory Coast	3	2	0	1	6	4	+2	6	Qualified for the quarterfinals
3	Australia	3	0	1	2	1	3	−2	1	
4	Serbia	3	0	1	2	3	7	−4	1	

7 August 2008
17:00

Australia	1–1	Serbia
Zadkovich 69'	Report	Rajković 78'

Shanghai Stadium, Shanghai
Attendance: 36,184
Referee: Jerome Damon (South Africa)
10 August 2008
19:45

Serbia	2–4	Ivory Coast
Mrdaković 16'; Rakić 90'	Report	Cissé 3'; Rajković 24' (o.g.); Kalou 70'; Gervinho 90+3'

Shanghai Stadium, Shanghai
Attendance: 38,320
Referee: Roberto Moreno (Panama)
13 August 2008
19:45

Argentina	2–0	Serbia
Lavezzi 13' (pen.); Buonanotte 84'	Report

Beijing Workers' Stadium, Beijing
Attendance: 53,668
Referee: Abdullah Al Hilali (Oman)

== Rowing ==
Men

Athlete	Event	Heats		Repechage		Semifinals		Final	
Athlete	Event	Time	Rank	Time	Rank	Time	Rank	Time	Rank
Goran Jagar; Nikola Stojić	Pair	6:46.71	2 SA/B	Bye		6:38.96	4 FB	6:49.12	7

Women

Athlete	Event	Heat		Quarterfinals		Semifinals		Final	
Athlete	Event	Time	Rank	Time	Rank	Time	Rank	Time	Rank
Iva Obradović	Single sculls	7:49:13	2 QF	7:39.16	3 SA/B	7:52.39	5 FB	7:53.83	11

Qualification Legend: FA=Final A (medal); FB=Final B (non-medal); FC=Final C (non-medal); FD=Final D (non-medal); FE=Final E (non-medal); FF=Final F (non-medal); SA/B=Semifinals A/B; SC/D=Semifinals C/D; SE/F=Semifinals E/F; QF=Quarterfinals; R=Repechage

== Shooting ==
Men

Athlete	Event	Qualification		Final	
Athlete	Event	Points	Rank	Points	Rank
Damir Mikec	10 m air pistol	580	13	Did not advance	
Damir Mikec	50 m pistol	559	7 Q	655.8	7*
Nemanja Mirosavljev	10 m air rifle	593	17	Did not advance	
Nemanja Mirosavljev	50 m rifle prone	590	33	Did not advance	
Nemanja Mirosavljev	50 m rifle 3 positions	1165	20	Did not advance	
Stevan Pletikosić	10 m air rifle	595	8 Q	697.7	7
Stevan Pletikosić	50 m rifle prone	594	10	Did not advance	
Stevan Pletikosić	50 m rifle 3 positions	1168	11	Did not advance	

* North Korean shooter Kim Jong Su was tested positive for the banned substance propranolol, and thereby stripped off his two medals from the pistol events. Therefore, Mikec moved up a position in each of his events.

Women

Athlete	Event	Qualification		Final	
Athlete	Event	Points	Rank	Points	Rank
Lidija Mihajlović	10 m air rifle	394	20	Did not advance	
Lidija Mihajlović	50 m rifle 3 positions	586	4 Q	686.0	7
Jasna Šekarić	10 m air pistol	384	6 Q	480.9	6
Jasna Šekarić	25 m pistol	285	21	Did not advance	

== Swimming ==
Men

Athlete	Event	Heat		Semifinal		Final	
Athlete	Event	Time	Rank	Time	Rank	Time	Rank
Milorad Čavić	100 m freestyle	48.15	6 Q	Withdrew			
Milorad Čavić	100 m butterfly	50.76 OR	1 Q	50.92	1 Q	50.59 EU	2nd place, silver medalist(s)
Ivan Lenđer	100 m butterfly	53.41	40	Did not advance			
Vladan Marković	200 m butterfly	2:03.12	43	Did not advance			
Čaba Silađi	100 m breaststroke	1:02.31	40	Did not advance			
Radovan Siljevski	200 m freestyle	1:50.25	40	Did not advance			

Women

Athlete	Event	Heat		Semifinal		Final	
Athlete	Event	Time	Rank	Time	Rank	Time	Rank
Nađa Higl	100 m breaststroke	1:13.19	43	Did not advance			
Nađa Higl	200 m breaststroke	2:32.78	33	Did not advance			
Miroslava Najdanovski	50 m freestyle	DNS		Did not advance			
Miroslava Najdanovski	100 m freestyle	56.50	38	Did not advance			
Milica Ostojić	200 m freestyle	2:03.19	40	Did not advance			
Marica Stražmešter	100 m backstroke	1:03.56	40	Did not advance			

== Table tennis ==
Athlete	Event	Preliminary round	Round 1	Round 2	Round 3	Round 4	Quarterfinals	Semifinals	Final / BM	
Athlete	Event	Opposition Result	Opposition Result	Opposition Result	Opposition Result	Opposition Result	Opposition Result	Opposition Result	Opposition Result	Rank
Aleksandar Karakašević	Men's singles	Bye	Zeng (TUR); W 4–1	Persson (SWE); L 2–4	Did not advance					

== Tennis ==
Serbia was to be represented in tennis by the women's world number one and 2008 French Open champion Ana Ivanovic and world number two Jelena Janković, men's number three and 2008 Australian Open champion Novak Djokovic and 2008 Wimbledon Championships champion and world number four in doubles Nenad Zimonjić, along with Janko Tipsarević. Ana Ivanovic announced her withdrawal from the tournament before her scheduled first round match due to a thumb injury.

Athlete	Event	Round of 64	Round of 32	Round of 16	Quarterfinals	Semifinals	Final / BM	
Athlete	Event	Opposition Score	Opposition Score	Opposition Score	Opposition Score	Opposition Score	Opposition Score	Rank
Novak Djokovic	Men's singles	Ginepri (USA); W 6–4, 6–4	Schüttler (GER); W 6–4, 6–2	Youzhny (RUS); W 7–6^{(7–3)}, 6–3	Monfils (FRA); W 4–6, 6–1, 6–4	Nadal (ESP); L 4–6, 6–1, 4–6	Blake (USA); W 6–3, 7–6^{(7–4)}	3rd place, bronze medalist(s)
Janko Tipsarević	Men's singles	Ferrer (ESP); W 7–6^{(10–8)}, 6–2	Rochus (BEL); L 6–7^{(5–7)}, 3–2, ret.	Did not advance				
Novak Djokovic; Nenad Zimonjić	Men's doubles	—	Damm / Vízner (CZE); L 6–3, 0–6, 2–6	Did not advance				
Ana Ivanovic	Women's singles	Withdrew because of thumb injury						
Jelena Janković	Women's singles	Black (ZIM); W 6–3, 6–3	A Bondarenko (UKR); W 7–5, 6–1	Cibulková (SVK); W 7–5, 6–1	Safina (RUS); L 2–6, 7–5, 3–6	Did not advance		

== Volleyball ==
=== Indoor ===
Serbia qualified a team in both the men's and the women's tournaments. The teams had virtually identical results: both teams finished fourth in their group, both teams advanced to the quarterfinals – where both teams lost. Similarly the final ranking of both teams was tied for 5th place.

==== Men's tournament ====
Roster

The following is the Serbian roster in the men's volleyball tournament of the 2008 Summer Olympics.

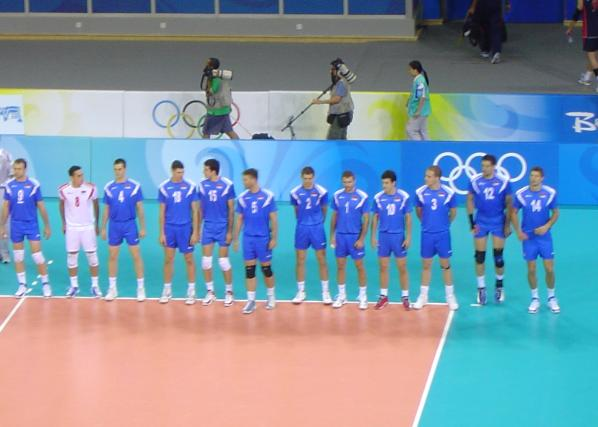
Serbia's team just before the group stage match against Brazil. From left: Grbić, Samardžić, Janić, Podraščanin, Starović, Petković, Bojović, Kovačević, Nikić, Bjelica, Gerić, Miljković.

Head Coach: (Montenegro) Igor Kolaković

№	Name	Date of birth	Height	Weight	Spike	Block	2008 club
1	Nikola Kovačević	14 February 1983	1.93 m (6 ft 4 in)	78 kg (172 lb)	350 cm (140 in)	340 cm (130 in)	(Italy) RPA Perugia
2	Dejan Bojović	3 April 1983	1.98 m (6 ft 6 in)	86 kg (190 lb)	360 cm (140 in)	345 cm (136 in)	(Italy) Gabeca Montichiari
3	Novica Bjelica	9 February 1983	2.02 m (6 ft 8 in)	97 kg (214 lb)	343 cm (135 in)	324 cm (128 in)	(Italy) Copra Nordmeccanica
4	Bojan Janić	11 March 1982	1.98 m (6 ft 6 in)	83 kg (183 lb)	345 cm (136 in)	322 cm (127 in)	(Italy) Marmi Lanza Verona
5	Vlado Petković	6 January 1983	1.98 m (6 ft 6 in)	97 kg (214 lb)	325 cm (128 in)	318 cm (125 in)	(Montenegro) Budućnost Podgorica
8	Marko Samardžić (L)	22 February 1983	1.90 m (6 ft 3 in)	82 kg (181 lb)	326 cm (128 in)	310 cm (120 in)	(France) Tours VB
9	Nikola Grbić (c)	6 September 1973	1.94 m (6 ft 4 in)	91 kg (201 lb)	346 cm (136 in)	320 cm (130 in)	(Italy) Trentino Volley
10	Miloš Nikić	31 March 1986	1.94 m (6 ft 4 in)	79 kg (174 lb)	350 cm (140 in)	330 cm (130 in)	(Italy) Sparkling Milano
12	Andrija Gerić	24 January 1977	2.03 m (6 ft 8 in)	101 kg (223 lb)	350 cm (140 in)	323 cm (127 in)	(Italy) Lube Banca Marche
14	Ivan Miljković	13 September 1979	2.06 m (6 ft 9 in)	88 kg (194 lb)	354 cm (139 in)	333 cm (131 in)	(Italy) M. Roma Volley
15	Saša Starović	19 October 1988	2.07 m (6 ft 9 in)	89 kg (196 lb)	335 cm (132 in)	321 cm (126 in)	(Montenegro) Budućnost Podgorica
18	Marko Podraščanin	29 August 1987	2.04 m (6 ft 8 in)	92 kg (203 lb)	343 cm (135 in)	326 cm (128 in)	(Italy) Famigliulo Corigliano

Group play

Pos	Team	Pld	W	L	Pts	SPW	SPL	SPR	SW	SL	SR	Qualification
1	Brazil	5	4	1	9	427	373	1.145	13	4	3.250	Quarterfinals
2	Russia	5	4	1	9	496	447	1.110	14	7	2.000	Quarterfinals
3	Poland	5	4	1	9	434	404	1.074	12	6	2.000	Quarterfinals
4	Serbia	5	2	3	7	440	439	1.002	9	10	0.900	Quarterfinals
5	Germany	5	1	4	6	418	440	0.950	6	12	0.500	
6	Egypt	5	0	5	5	267	379	0.704	0	15	0.000	

All times are China Standard Time (UTC+8).

10 August 2008; 10:00	Serbia	1–3	Russia	Beijing Institute of Technology Gymnasium, Beijing; Attendance: 3,100; Referees: Bela Hobor (HUN), Osamu Sakaide (JPN)
10 August 2008; 10:00	(25–20, 21–25, 22–25, 14–25) result statistics			Beijing Institute of Technology Gymnasium, Beijing; Attendance: 3,100; Referees: Bela Hobor (HUN), Osamu Sakaide (JPN)

12 August 2008; 15:00	Serbia	1–3	Brazil	Capital Indoor Stadium, Beijing; Attendance: 9,000; Referees: Ning Wang (CHN), Osamu Sakaide (JPN)
12 August 2008; 15:00	(27–25, 20–25, 17–25, 21–25) result statistics			Capital Indoor Stadium, Beijing; Attendance: 9,000; Referees: Ning Wang (CHN), Osamu Sakaide (JPN)

14 August 2008; 15:05	Poland	3–1	Serbia	Capital Indoor Stadium, Beijing; Attendance: 7,000; Referees: Umit Sokullu (TUR), Patrick Deregnaucourt (FRA)
14 August 2008; 15:05	(31–29, 22–25, 25–22, 25–21) result statistics			Capital Indoor Stadium, Beijing; Attendance: 7,000; Referees: Umit Sokullu (TUR), Patrick Deregnaucourt (FRA)

16 August 2008; 12:30	Serbia	3–1	Germany	Capital Indoor Stadium, Beijing; Attendance: 12,500; Referees: Ning Wang (CHN), Bela Hobor (HUN)
16 August 2008; 12:30	(25–21, 27–25, 24–26, 25–23) result statistics			Capital Indoor Stadium, Beijing; Attendance: 12,500; Referees: Ning Wang (CHN), Bela Hobor (HUN)

18 August 2008; 15:15	Egypt	0–3	Serbia	Capital Indoor Stadium, Beijing; Attendance: 6,000; Referees: Victor Rodriguez (PUR), Ibrahim Al-Naama (QAT)
18 August 2008; 15:15	(16–25, 13–25, 17–25) result statistics			Capital Indoor Stadium, Beijing; Attendance: 6,000; Referees: Victor Rodriguez (PUR), Ibrahim Al-Naama (QAT)

Quarterfinal

20 August 2008; 22:01	United States	3–2	Serbia	Capital Indoor Stadium, Beijing; Attendance: 7,500; Referees: Ning Wang (CHN), Mohammad Shahmiri (IRI)
20 August 2008; 22:01	(20–25, 25–23, 21–25, 25–18, 15–12) result statistics			Capital Indoor Stadium, Beijing; Attendance: 7,500; Referees: Ning Wang (CHN), Mohammad Shahmiri (IRI)

==== Women's tournament ====
Roster

The following is the Serbian roster in the women's volleyball tournament of the 2008 Summer Olympics.

Head Coach: Zoran Terzić

№	Name	Date of birth	Height	Weight	Spike	Block	2008 club
1	Jelena Nikolić	13 April 1982	1.92 m (6 ft 4 in)	75 kg (165 lb)	315 cm (124 in)	300 cm (120 in)	(Japan) Takefuji Bamboo
2	Jovana Brakočević	5 March 1988	1.96 m (6 ft 5 in)	77 kg (170 lb)	309 cm (122 in)	295 cm (116 in)	(Italy) Spess Volley Conegliano
3	Ivana Đerisilo	8 August 1983	1.85 m (6 ft 1 in)	72 kg (159 lb)	306 cm (120 in)	291 cm (115 in)	(Switzerland) Voléro Zürich
5	Nataša Krsmanović	19 June 1985	1.86 m (6 ft 1 in)	70 kg (150 lb)	294 cm (116 in)	273 cm (107 in)	(Switzerland) Voléro Zürich
7	Brižitka Molnar	28 July 1985	1.82 m (6 ft 0 in)	66 kg (146 lb)	304 cm (120 in)	290 cm (110 in)	(Romania) Metal Galati
9	Jovana Vesović	21 June 1987	1.82 m (6 ft 0 in)	68 kg (150 lb)	283 cm (111 in)	268 cm (106 in)	(Serbia) Jedinstvo Užice
10	Maja Ognjenović	6 August 1984	1.83 m (6 ft 0 in)	68 kg (150 lb)	290 cm (110 in)	270 cm (110 in)	(Romania) Metal Galati
11	Vesna Čitaković (C)	3 February 1979	1.87 m (6 ft 2 in)	75 kg (165 lb)	305 cm (120 in)	300 cm (120 in)	(Turkey) Eczacıbaşı Istanbul
13	Maja Simanić	8 February 1980	1.80 m (5 ft 11 in)	70 kg (150 lb)	280 cm (110 in)	270 cm (110 in)	(Croatia) ZOK Rijeka
15	Sanja Malagurski	8 June 1990	1.92 m (6 ft 4 in)	77 kg (170 lb)	305 cm (120 in)	295 cm (116 in)	(Slovenia) Hit Nova Gorica
17	Stefana Veljković	9 January 1990	1.90 m (6 ft 3 in)	76 kg (168 lb)	320 cm (130 in)	305 cm (120 in)	(Serbia) Poštar 064 Beograd
18	Suzana Ćebić (L)	9 November 1984	1.67 m (5 ft 6 in)	60 kg (130 lb)	279 cm (110 in)	255 cm (100 in)	(Serbia) Jedinstvo Užice

Group play

Pos	Team	Pld	W	L	Pts	SPW	SPL	SPR	SW	SL	SR	Qualification
1	Brazil	5	5	0	10	377	226	1.668	15	0	MAX	Quarterfinals
2	Italy	5	4	1	9	372	315	1.181	12	4	3.000	Quarterfinals
3	Russia	5	3	2	8	353	312	1.131	10	6	1.667	Quarterfinals
4	Serbia	5	2	3	7	343	349	0.983	6	10	0.600	Quarterfinals
5	Kazakhstan	5	1	4	6	323	404	0.800	4	13	0.308	
6	Algeria	5	0	5	5	230	392	0.587	1	15	0.067	

All times are China Standard Time (UTC+8).

9 August 2008; 12:15	Serbia	3–1	Kazakhstan	Beijing Institute of Technology Gymnasium; Attendance: 1,800; Referees: Mitch Davidson (Canada), Victor Manuel Rodriguez (Puerto Rico)
9 August 2008; 12:15	(25–21, 25–17, 23–25, 25–21) result statistics			Beijing Institute of Technology Gymnasium; Attendance: 1,800; Referees: Mitch Davidson (Canada), Victor Manuel Rodriguez (Puerto Rico)

11 August 2008; 10:00	Algeria	0–3	Serbia	Beijing Institute of Technology Gymnasium; Attendance: 3,100; Referees: Janpen Jirakakul (Thailand), Liu Jiang (China)
11 August 2008; 10:00	(14–25, 13–25, 13–25) result statistics			Beijing Institute of Technology Gymnasium; Attendance: 3,100; Referees: Janpen Jirakakul (Thailand), Liu Jiang (China)

13 August 2008; 14:30	Serbia	0–3	Brazil	Capital Indoor Stadium; Attendance: 11,000; Referees: Kim Kun-Tae (South Korea), Frans Loderus (Netherlands)
13 August 2008; 14:30	(15–25, 13–25, 23–25) result statistics			Capital Indoor Stadium; Attendance: 11,000; Referees: Kim Kun-Tae (South Korea), Frans Loderus (Netherlands)

15 August 2008; 14:30	Serbia	0–3	Italy	Capital Indoor Stadium; Attendance: 11,000; Referees: Frans Loderus (Netherlands), Frank Leuthauser (Germany)
15 August 2008; 14:30	(23–25, 20–25, 19–25) result statistics			Capital Indoor Stadium; Attendance: 11,000; Referees: Frans Loderus (Netherlands), Frank Leuthauser (Germany)

17 August 2008; 22:00	Russia	3–0	Serbia	Capital Indoor Stadium; Attendance: 7,000; Referees: Osamu Sakaide (Japan), Karin Zahorcova (Czech Republic)
17 August 2008; 22:00	(25–21, 25–16, 25–20) result statistics			Capital Indoor Stadium; Attendance: 7,000; Referees: Osamu Sakaide (Japan), Karin Zahorcova (Czech Republic)

Quarterfinal

19 August 2008; 10:00	Cuba	3–0	Serbia	Capital Indoor Stadium; Attendance: 12,500; Referees: Ibrahim al-Naama (Qatar), Kim Kun-Tae (South Korea)
19 August 2008; 10:00	(26–24, 25–19, 26–24) result statistics			Capital Indoor Stadium; Attendance: 12,500; Referees: Ibrahim al-Naama (Qatar), Kim Kun-Tae (South Korea)

== Water polo ==
Serbia participated in the men's tournament, where the team won the bronze medal.

=== Men's tournament ===
Roster

The following is the Serbian roster in the men's water polo tournament of the 2008 Summer Olympics.

№	Name	Pos.	Height	Weight	Date of birth	Club
1	Denis Šefik	GK	1.98 m (6 ft 6 in)	120 kg (260 lb)	20 September 1979	(Montenegro) PVK Budvanska rivijera
2	Andrija Prlainović	D	1.87 m (6 ft 2 in)	94 kg (207 lb)	28 April 1987	(Serbia) VK Partizan
3	Živko Gocić	CF	1.93 m (6 ft 4 in)	100 kg (220 lb)	22 August 1982	(Greece) Olympiacos
4	Vanja Udovičić	CB	1.95 m (6 ft 5 in)	102 kg (225 lb)	12 September 1982	(Italy) Pro Recco
5	Dejan Savić	CB	1.90 m (6 ft 3 in)	120 kg (260 lb)	24 April 1975	(Russia) Sintez Kazan
6	Duško Pijetlović	CF	1.92 m (6 ft 4 in)	102 kg (225 lb)	25 April 1985	(Serbia) VK Partizan
7	Nikola Rađen	CB	1.95 m (6 ft 5 in)	103 kg (227 lb)	29 January 1985	(Serbia) VK Partizan
8	Filip Filipović	D	1.97 m (6 ft 6 in)	100 kg (220 lb)	2 May 1987	(Serbia) VK Partizan
9	Aleksandar Ćirić	D	1.92 m (6 ft 4 in)	90 kg (200 lb)	30 December 1977	(Montenegro) PVK Budvanska rivijera
10	Aleksandar Šapić	D	1.88 m (6 ft 2 in)	100 kg (220 lb)	1 June 1978	(Russia) Shturm 2002 Chekhov
11	Vladimir Vujasinović	CB	1.87 m (6 ft 2 in)	98 kg (216 lb)	14 August 1973	(Serbia) VK Partizan
12	Branko Peković	CF	1.91 m (6 ft 3 in)	107 kg (236 lb)	7 May 1979	(Russia) Dynamo Moscow
13	Slobodan Soro	GK	1.96 m (6 ft 5 in)	100 kg (220 lb)	23 December 1978	(Serbia) VK Partizan

Head coach: Dejan Udovičić

Group play

Team	Pld	W	D	L	GF	GA	GD	Pts	Qualification
United States	5	4	0	1	37	31	+6	8	Qualified for the semifinals
Croatia	5	4	0	1	56	31	+25	8	Qualified for the quarterfinals
Serbia	5	3	0	2	50	38	+12	6	Qualified for the quarterfinals
Germany	5	2	0	3	33	44	−11	4	Will play for places 7–10
Italy	5	2	0	3	57	50	+7	4	Will play for places 7–12
China	5	0	0	5	25	64	−39	0	Will play for places 7–12

All times are China Standard Time (UTC+8).

10 August 2008; 12:10	Report	Serbia	11–7	Germany	Ying Tung Natatorium, Beijing; Referees: Tulga (TUR), Littlejohn (GBR)
10 August 2008; 12:10	Report	Score by quarters: 1–3, 5–2, 2–2, 3–0			Ying Tung Natatorium, Beijing; Referees: Tulga (TUR), Littlejohn (GBR)
10 August 2008; 12:10	Report	Pijetlović 4, Udovičić 2, Šapić 2	Goals	Politze 2, Mackeben 2	Ying Tung Natatorium, Beijing; Referees: Tulga (TUR), Littlejohn (GBR)

12 August 2008; 15:20	Report	Serbia	8–11	Croatia	Ying Tung Natatorium, Beijing; Referees: Turcotte (CAN), Klopper (NED)
12 August 2008; 15:20	Report	Score by quarters: 3–1, 1–4, 1–4, 3–2			Ying Tung Natatorium, Beijing; Referees: Turcotte (CAN), Klopper (NED)
12 August 2008; 15:20	Report	Šapić 4, Udovičić 2	Goals	Joković 3, Barač 3, Smodlaka 2	Ying Tung Natatorium, Beijing; Referees: Turcotte (CAN), Klopper (NED)

14 August 2008; 10:50	Report	United States	2–4	Serbia	Ying Tung Natatorium, Beijing; Referees: Antsiferov (RUS), Littlejohn (GBR)
14 August 2008; 10:50	Report	Score by quarters: 0–0, 1–2, 0–2, 1–0			Ying Tung Natatorium, Beijing; Referees: Antsiferov (RUS), Littlejohn (GBR)
14 August 2008; 10:50	Report	Varellas 2	Goals	Udovičić 1, Pijetlović 1, Šapić 1, Vujasinović 1	Ying Tung Natatorium, Beijing; Referees: Antsiferov (RUS), Littlejohn (GBR)

16 August 2008; 16:40	Report	Serbia	15–5	China	Ying Tung Natatorium, Beijing; Referees: Koryzna (POL), Oshima (JPN)
16 August 2008; 16:40	Report	Score by quarters: 5–2, 2–1, 4–2, 4–0			Ying Tung Natatorium, Beijing; Referees: Koryzna (POL), Oshima (JPN)
16 August 2008; 16:40	Report	Šapić 9, Vujasinović 3	Goals	Liang 3, Xie 2	Ying Tung Natatorium, Beijing; Referees: Koryzna (POL), Oshima (JPN)

18 August 2008; 9:30	Report	Serbia	12–13	Italy	Ying Tung Natatorium, Beijing; Referees: Klopper (NED), Antsiferov (RUS)
18 August 2008; 9:30	Report	Score by quarters: 3–3, 2–3, 3–5, 4–2			Ying Tung Natatorium, Beijing; Referees: Klopper (NED), Antsiferov (RUS)
18 August 2008; 9:30	Report	Šapić 3, Prlainović 2, Filipović 2, Vujasinović 2	Goals	Calcaterra 3, Felugo 2, Bencivenga 2, Sottani 2	Ying Tung Natatorium, Beijing; Referees: Klopper (NED), Antsiferov (RUS)

Quarterfinal

20 August 2008; 17:20	Report	Spain	5–9	Serbia	Ying Tung Natatorium, Beijinb; Referees: Turcotte (CAN), Klopper (NED)
20 August 2008; 17:20	Report	Score by quarters: 1–0, 1–5, 1–2, 2–2			Ying Tung Natatorium, Beijinb; Referees: Turcotte (CAN), Klopper (NED)
20 August 2008; 17:20	Report	Molina 2	Goals	Pijetlović 4, Ćirić 2, Vujasinović 2	Ying Tung Natatorium, Beijinb; Referees: Turcotte (CAN), Klopper (NED)

Semifinal

22 August 2008; 19:40	Report	United States	10–5	Serbia	Ying Tung Natatorium, Beijing; Referees: Turcotte (CAN), Margeta (SLO)
22 August 2008; 19:40	Report	Score by quarters: 3–3, 2–1, 2–1, 3–0			Ying Tung Natatorium, Beijing; Referees: Turcotte (CAN), Margeta (SLO)
22 August 2008; 19:40	Report	Azevedo 3, Beaubien 2, Bailey 2	Goals	Pijetlović 2, Vujasinović 2	Ying Tung Natatorium, Beijing; Referees: Turcotte (CAN), Margeta (SLO)

Bronze medal game

24 August 2008; 14:20	Report	Montenegro	4–6	Serbia (bronze)	Ying Tung Natatorium, Beijing; Referees: Tulga (TUR), Margeta (SLO)
24 August 2008; 14:20	Report	Score by quarters: 0–2, 1–2, 1–2, 2–0			Ying Tung Natatorium, Beijing; Referees: Tulga (TUR), Margeta (SLO)
24 August 2008; 14:20	Report	M. Janović 2	Goals	Savić 2	Ying Tung Natatorium, Beijing; Referees: Tulga (TUR), Margeta (SLO)

== Wrestling ==
Key:

- VT - Victory by Fall.
- PP - Decision by Points - the loser with technical points.
- PO - Decision by Points - the loser without technical points.

Men's Greco-Roman

Athlete	Event	Qualification	Round of 16	Quarterfinal	Semifinal	Repechage 1	Repechage 2	Final / BM	
Athlete	Event	Opposition Result	Opposition Result	Opposition Result	Opposition Result	Opposition Result	Opposition Result	Opposition Result	Rank
Kristijan Fris	−55 kg	Koval (UKR); W 3–1 ^{PP}	Mankiev (RUS); L 0–3 ^{PO}	Did not advance		Hafizov (UZB); W 3–0 ^{PO}	Sourian (IRI); L 1–3 ^{PP}	Did not advance	7
Davor Štefanek	−60 kg	Bye	Aripov (UZB); L 1–3 ^{PP}	Did not advance					15

== See also ==
- Serbia at the 2008 Summer Paralympics
