= Grant Stoelwinder =

Personal information
- Born: 28 August 1970 Perth, Western Australia, Australia
- Died: 29 January 2023 (aged 52)

Sport
- Sport: Swimming

Grant Stoelwinder (28 August 1970 – 29 January 2023) was an Australian national gold medalist swimmer, head coach of the West Coast Swimming Club in Western Australia and Olympic swimming coach.

== Coaching career ==
Grant was the head coach at SOPAC (Sydney Olympic Park Aquatic Centre) and also coached at the University of Sydney. Prior to this, Grant obtained coaching experience under Lyn Mackenzie, a former Olympic swimmer herself.

Grant's team had considerable success in Australian swimming, with many representatives on State and National teams, as well as four swimmers at the 2004 Summer Olympics. This success led to Grant being named WA Coach of the Year every year since 2004, and with his head coach, Mel Tantrum, he reached the first place club point score at the Australian Age Swimming Championships in 2007.

Grant was also coach for the current World's Fastest 50m and 100m swimmer, Eamon Sullivan. With Grant's guidance and his specific high intensity program for sprints, Eamon increased his success in the pool over the last year. At the 2008 Australian Swimming Championships held at the Australian Olympic Park Aquatic Centre, Eamon broke the long-standing record of Alexander Popov for this swim twice, with a final time of 21.28 seconds. According to Grant, this was a 'perfect swim'. Eamon attributes his faster swim to a 'few words' from Grant.

Grant joined the procession of handshaking with the swimming luminaries during the highlights of Australian Olympic 2008 Beijing Swim Team on the final night of these selection trials with the team successfuls.

Following the Olympics, Stoelwinder moved to Sydney to become the head coach at the New South Wales Institute of Sport. He was joined by Sullivan and Libby Trickett, the world record holder in the 50 m and 100 m freestyle, who has moved from Brisbane. A few weeks later, 100m Butterfly 2008 Olympic bronze medalist Andrew Lauterstein joined the team.

== Personal life ==
Stoelwinder died on January 29, 2023 aged 52. He was surrounded by his daughter, mother, sisters and partner after a battle with neurological degenerative dementia.
