= Ankur Poseria =

Indian-American swimmer

Personal information
- Full name: Ankur Poseria
- National team: India
- Born: 16 March 1987 (age 39) Hartville, Ohio, United States
- Height: 1.85 m (6 ft 1 in)
- Weight: 80 kg (176 lb)

Sport
- Sport: Swimming
- Strokes: Butterfly
- College team: University of Southern California (U.S.)
- Coach: Dave Salo (U.S.)

Ankur Poseria (born 16 March 1987) is an Indian-American swimmer, who specialized in butterfly events. He is an Indian record holder in the 100 m butterfly, until it was eventually broken by his fellow swimmer Virdhawal Khade at the 2009 Asia Age Group Championships in Tokyo, Japan.

== Career ==
He attended Hoover High School in North Canton, Ohio, where he was a multiple-time All-American and a three-time YMCA national finalist. He also holds an Overseas Citizenship of India card.

Poseria qualified for the men's 100 m butterfly at the 2008 Summer Olympics in Beijing, by establishing an Indian record and clearing a FINA B-standard entry time of 53.68 from the Husky International Meet in Federal Way, Washington. He challenged seven other swimmers on the fourth heat, including Olympic veterans Sotirios Pastras of Greece, Juan Veloz of Mexico, and Michal Rubáček of the Czech Republic. He rounded out the field to seventh place by more than a second behind Malta's Ryan Gambin in 54.74 seconds. Poseria failed to advance into the semifinals, as he placed fifty-seventh overall in the preliminaries.

Poseria is a graduate of international public relations at the University of Southern California in Los Angeles. He is also a varsity swimmer and member of the USC Trojans under professional coach Dave Salo.
