= Marco Camargo =

Ecuadorian swimmer

Personal information
- Full name: Marco Antonio Camargo González
- National team: Ecuador
- Born: 8 May 1989 (age 37) Guayaquil, Ecuador
- Height: 1.70 m (5 ft 7 in)
- Weight: 68 kg (150 lb)

Sport
- Sport: Swimming
- Strokes: Butterfly
- Club: Club Deportivo Diana Quintana
- Coach: Rafael Herbas
Medal record
Men's swimming
Representing Ecuador
World Youth Championships
| Bronze medal – third place | 2006 Rio de Janeiro | 200 m butterfly |

Marco Antonio Camargo González (born May 8, 1989) is an Ecuadorian swimmer, who specialized in butterfly events. He won a bronze medal in the 200 m butterfly at the 2006 FINA Youth World Swimming Championships in Rio de Janeiro, Brazil, and eventually represented his nation Ecuador at the 2008 Summer Olympics, placing himself among the top swimmers in the 100 and 200 m butterfly.

Camargo was invited by FINA under the Universality rule to compete as a 19-year-old for Ecuador in the men's 100 m butterfly at the 2008 Summer Olympics in Beijing.
