= Sotirios Pastras =

Greek swimmer

Personal information
- Full name: Sotirios Pastras
- National team: Greece
- Born: 21 April 1986 (age 40) Volos, Greece
- Height: 1.80 m (5 ft 11 in)
- Weight: 75 kg (165 lb)

Sport
- Sport: Swimming
- Strokes: Butterfly
- Club: Nova
- Coach: Nikolaos Prantzos

Sotirios Pastras (Greek: Σωτήριος Πάστρας; born April 21, 1986) is a Greek former swimmer, who specialized in butterfly events. He is a multiple-time Greek champion and record holder in the butterfly (50, 100, and 200 m). Pastras is a computer engineering graduate at University of Thessaly, and is currently a member of Nova Club in Volos, under the tutelage of his personal coach Nikolaos Prantzos.

Pastras made his first Greek team, as an 18-year-old, at the 2004 Summer Olympics in Athens, where he competed in the men's 100 m butterfly. He raced to third place in heat 4 and twenty-ninth overall by six hundredths of a second (0.06) behind Slovenia's Peter Mankoč in 54.20 seconds.

At the 2008 Summer Olympics in Beijing, Pastras qualified again for the men's 100 m butterfly by eclipsing a FINA B-standard entry time of 53.45 from the Nioveia Grand Prix in Thessaloniki. He challenged seven other swimmers on the same heat as Athens, including Olympic veterans Juan Veloz of Mexico and Michal Rubáček of the Czech Republic. Pastras cruised to second place by 0.17 of a second behind Denmark's Jakob Andkjær, breaking both his personal best and Greek record of 52.41 seconds. Pastras failed to advance into the semifinals, as he placed twenty-fifth out of 66 swimmers in the preliminaries.

In November 2011, Pastras shortly retired from his swimming career to pursue his studies in media.
