= Oldřich Škácha =

Czech photographer (1941–2014)

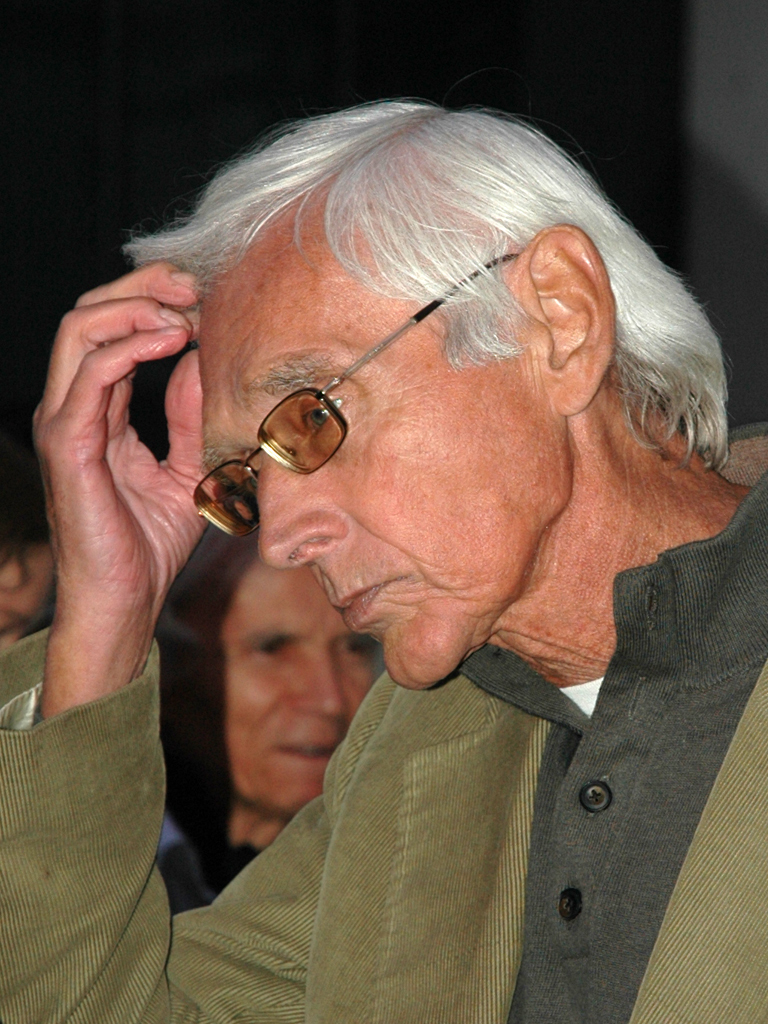
Škácha in 2012

Oldřich Škácha (16 October 1941 – 29 March 2014) was a Czech photographer and anti-communist dissident during the Czechoslovak Socialist Republic era in the 1970s. He was a signatory of Charter 77 in 1977.

Škácha worked as a photographer for numerous Czech and Czechoslovak magazines and publications, as well as Barrandov Studios. He was known as a longtime photographer of Václav Havel during the communist and post-communist periods.

Oldřich Škácha died from a lengthy illness on 29 March 2014, at the age of 72.
