= Andrew Lauterstein =

Australian swimmer

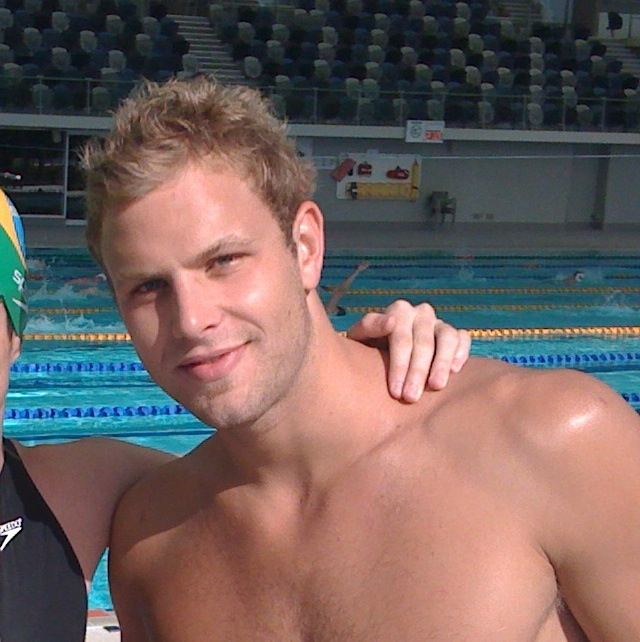

Personal information
- Full name: Andrew George Lauterstein
- Nicknames: "Ando", "Waterstein"
- National team: Australia
- Born: 22 May 1987 (age 39) Melbourne, Victoria
- Height: 1.86 m (6 ft 1 in)
- Weight: 90 kg (198 lb)

Sport
- Sport: Swimming
- Strokes: Butterfly, freestyle
Medal record
Men's swimming
Representing Australia
Olympic Games
Silver medal – second place	2008 Beijing	4×100 m medley
Bronze medal – third place	2008 Beijing	100 m butterfly
Bronze medal – third place	2008 Beijing	4×100 m freestyle
World Championships (LC)
Gold medal – first place	2007 Melbourne	4×100 m medley
Bronze medal – third place	2009 Rome	4×100 m medley
Pan Pacific Championships
Bronze medal – third place	2006 Victoria	4×100 m medley
Commonwealth Games
Gold medal – first place	2006 Melbourne	4×100 m medley

Andrew George Lauterstein (born 22 May 1987) is an Australian swimmer and a three-time Olympic medalist.

== Personal ==
Lauterstein grew up in Black Rock, Victoria and attended Brighton Grammar School. He has an elder brother and a younger sister. In his youth, Lauterstein was in the Victorian state football team and represented Australia at baseball in youth teams. He quit both sports at the age of 16 to concentrate on swimming. Outside of his swimming life, Lauterstein is a keen aspiring DJ and was one of the 50 nominees for the 2008 Cleo Bachelor of the Year award, which was eventually awarded to Jason Dundas.

== 2007 World Championships ==
At the 2007 World Aquatics Championships in Melbourne, Lauterstein qualified 11th in the heats of the 100-metre butterfly in a time of 52.63 seconds. He managed only a time of 52.99 seconds in the semifinals and was eliminated in 15th place.

In the 4×100-metre freestyle relay, Lauterstein swam the third leg. Australia was fifth at the start of his leg. Lauterstein was the second slowest of the third leg swimmers, and Australia were in last place at the end of his 49.17-second split, which was the 19th fastest out of the 24 swimmers who had a flying start. Australia finished fifth.

In the 4×100-metre medley relay, Lauterstein swam the butterfly leg and started his split with Australia in second place behind Japan. Lauterstein swam the fifth fastest butterfly leg with a split of 52.63 seconds and was overtaken by his Russian counterpart, leaving Australia third at the last change. Eamon Sullivan anchored Australia to gold by overtaking his Japanese and Russian counterparts.

2007 World Championships Events
Final medal count: 1 (1 gold, 0 silver, 0 bronze)
Event	Time	Place
4 × 100 m freestyle relay	3:15.89	5th
100 m butterfly	52.99	15th
4 × 100 m medley relay	3:34.93	Gold

== 2008 Olympics ==
In the 2008 Summer Olympics in Beijing, he swam in both the 4×100-metre freestyle relay and the 100-metre butterfly. He swam the second leg of the final in the 4×100-metre freestyle relay, winning a bronze medal. In the 100-metre butterfly, Lauterstein swam a personal best and Australian record in each of the three stages, and qualified for the final with the third fastest qualifying time. He took the bronze medal in the final with a time of 51.12 seconds in a race where the US' Michael Phelps won his 7th gold medal of the Games. Lauterstein edged out world record holder Ian Crocker for the bronze by 0.01 of a second. Lauterstein also won a silver medal in 4×100-metre medley relay in which he swam the butterfly leg.

2008 Summer Olympics Events
Final medal count: 3 (0 gold, 1 silver, 2 bronze)
Event	Time	Place	
4 × 100 m freestyle relay	3:09.91	Bronze	AR
100 m butterfly	51.12	Bronze	AR
4 × 100 m medley relay	3:30.04	Silver	AR

Following the Olympics, Lauterstein left his long-term coach Glenn Baker and moved to the New South Wales Institute of Sport under Grant Stoelwinder. Stoelwinder coaches Libby Lenton and Eamon Sullivan the world record holders in the 50- and 100-metre freestyle for women and men respectively.

In January, Lauterstein returned to action contesting the Victorian and New South Wales state championships. He showed tremendous form starting off the year going sub-52 in his signature event with only three weeks preparation.

In March, Lauterstein sent a message at the 2009 Telstra Australian Swimming Championships (world championships trials). He clocked 48.64 in the 100-metre freestyle, missing the individual spot behind Matt Targett by 0.01 of second. In the 50-metre butterfly, he got revenge against Targett, setting a new Australian record of 23.30, ironically, besting Targett by 0.01 of a second. His final task was the 100-metre butterfly, after a misleading heats, and semi-finals, Lauterstein clocked 51.13, just missing his Australian record by 0.01 of a second.

== 2009 World Championships ==
Day 1 brought the 4×100-metre freestyle relay, and with the absence of Eamon Sullivan and Ashley Callus, Australia were never in medal territory, finishing eighth. The 100-metre butterfly final saw Lauterstein set an Australian record, but he failed to get on the podium. After two disappointing finals, he did not leave Rome empty handed, capturing a bronze medal in the 4×100-metre medley relay. In the preliminaries, he clocked a 50.16, which was the second fastest 100-metre butterfly split in history behind Michael Phelps.

2009 World Championships Events
Final medal count: 1 (0 gold, 0 silver, 1 bronze)
Event	Time	Place	
4 × 100 m freestyle relay	3:12.40	8th	
100 m butterfly	50.85	5th	AR
4 × 100 m medley relay	3:28.64	Bronze	AR

== See also ==
- List of Commonwealth Games medallists in swimming (men)
- List of Olympic medalists in swimming (men)
