= Nikola Kovačević =

Nikola Kovačević may refer to:

- Nikola Kovačević (volleyball)
- Nikola Kovačević (footballer)
- Nikola Kovačević (politician)
- Nikola Kovačević (lawyer)
