= Martin Škacha =

Czech swimmer

Personal information
- Full name: Martin Škacha
- National team: Czech Republic
- Born: 28 October 1983 (age 42) Polička, Czechoslovakia
- Height: 1.94 m (6 ft 4 1/2 in)
- Weight: 89 kg (196 lb)

Sport
- Sport: Swimming
- Strokes: Freestyle
- Club: Kometa Brno
- Coach: Ondřej Butir
Medal record
Men's swimming
Representing the Czech Republic
European Junior Championships
Bronze medal – third place	2001 Valletta	100 m freestyle

Martin Škacha (born 28 October 1983) is a Czech former swimmer, who specialized in freestyle events. He won a bronze medal in the 100 m freestyle (51.52) at the 2001 European Junior Swimming Championships in Valletta, Malta. Skacha is also a member of the swimming team for Kometa Brno, and is trained by head coach Ondřej Butir.

Škacha qualified for the men's 4 × 200 m freestyle relay, as a member of the Czech Republic team, at the 2004 Summer Olympics in Athens. Teaming with Michal Rubáček, Květoslav Svoboda, and Josef Horký in heat two, Skacha anchored the last 50 metres to finish the race with a split of 1:52.35, but the Czechs settled only for seventh place and thirteenth overall in a final time of 7:26.26.
