= Christophe Lebon =

French swimmer

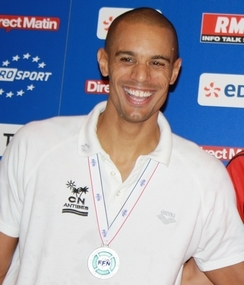
- 2011

Personal information
- Born: 8 November 1982 (age 43) Pontoise, France
- Height: 188 cm (6 ft 2 in)
- Weight: 78 kg (172 lb)

Sport
- Sport: Swimming
- Strokes: Butterfly

Christophe Lebon (born 8 November 1982) is a French swimmer who specialises in the 100 meter butterfly and the 200 meter butterfly. Lebon competed at the 2008 Summer Olympics.
