= Jakob Andkjær =

Danish swimmer (born 1985)

Personal information
- Full name: Jakob Schiøtt Andkjær
- Nationality: Denmark
- Born: 7 May 1985 (age 41)

Sport
- Sport: Swimming
- Strokes: Butterfly, freestyle
- Club: Vallensbæk IF
- College team: Auburn Tigers
Medal record
World Championships (LC)
Bronze medal – third place	2007 Melbourne	50 m butterfly
European Championships (LC)
Bronze medal – third place	2006 Budapest	50 m butterfly

Jakob Schiøtt Andkjær (born 7 May 1985) is a Danish swimmer. He attended Auburn University, where he swam for the Auburn Tigers. He won the bronze medal in the 50 m butterfly at the 2007 World Aquatics Championships.

He competed in the 100m freestyle, 50m freestyle, and 100m butterfly events at the 2008 Olympic Games in Beijing, China, representing Denmark.
