= Michal Rubáček =

Czech swimmer

Personal information
- Full name: Michal Rubáček
- National team: Czech Republic
- Born: 19 December 1986 (age 39) Znojmo, Czechoslovakia
- Height: 1.93 m (6 ft 4 in)
- Weight: 93 kg (205 lb)

Sport
- Sport: Swimming
- Strokes: Butterfly
- Club: TJ Znojmo
- Coach: Jirí Kynera (personal); Jaroslava Passerová (national)
Medal record
Men's swimming
Representing the Czech Republic
Universiade
Bronze medal – third place	2009 Belgrade	100 m butterfly

Michal Rubáček (born 19 December 1986) is a Czech swimmer, who specialized in butterfly events. He is a two-time Olympian, and a multiple-time Czech national record holder for the butterfly events (50, 100, and 200 m).

Rubacek made his first Czech team, as a 17-year-old, at the 2004 Summer Olympics in Athens, where he competed only in butterfly and relay freestyle events. He also joined with his fellow swimmers Květoslav Svoboda, Josef Horký, and Martin Škacha in the men's 4 × 200 m freestyle relay. Swimming the lead-off leg, Rubacek recorded a split of 1:51.37, and the Czech team went on to finish heat two in seventh place and thirtieth overall, for a total time of 7:26.26. Few days later, Rubacek won the second heat of the men's 100 m butterfly by approximately one second ahead of Uzbekistan's Oleg Lyashko, with a time of 54.87 seconds. Finishing only in thirty-ninth place, Rubacek failed to qualify for the semifinals.

At the 2008 Summer Olympics in Beijing, Rubacek qualified for the second time in the men's 100 m butterfly, by clearing a FINA B-cut of 53.71 from the European Championships in Eindhoven, Netherlands. He challenged seven other swimmers in the fourth heat, including three-time Olympians Ioan Gherghel of Romania and Juan Veloz of Mexico. Rubacek raced to fourth place by five hundredths of a second (0.05) ahead of Veloz, breaking a new Czech record of 53.53 seconds. Rubacek failed to advance into the semifinals, as he placed forty-second out of 66 swimmers in the preliminaries.

At the 2009 FINA World Championships in Rome, Italy, Rubacek dipped under a 52-second barrier, and lowered his record to 51.99 seconds in the preliminary heats of the 100 m butterfly. Few weeks later, he won a bronze medal in the same stroke at the Summer Universiade in Belgrade, Serbia, posting his time at 52.33 seconds.

On 27 March 2012 Rubacek ordered a two-year suspension from the Czech Swimming Federation (Czech: Český svaz plaveckých sportů, CSPS), after he was tested positive for a banned stimulant methylhexanamine.
