= Serhiy Breus =

Ukrainian swimmer (born 1983)

Sergiy Breus
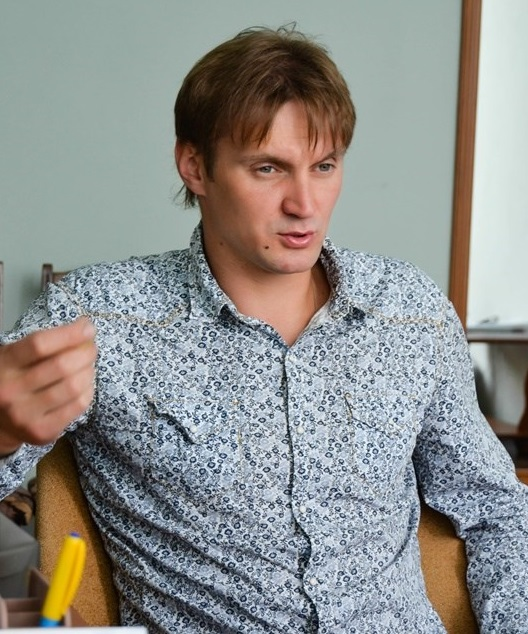
- Breus during an interview

Personal information
- Native name: Сергій Бреус
- Nationality: Ukraine
- Born: January 30, 1983 (age 43) Brovary, Kiev Oblast, Ukrainian SSR, Soviet Union
- Height: 1.94 m (6 ft 4 in)

Sport
- Sport: Swimming
- Strokes: Butterfly
Medal record
Men's swimming
Representing Ukraine
World Championships (LC)
Bronze medal – third place	2005 Montreal	50 m butterfly
World Championships (SC)
Silver medal – second place	2006 Shanghai	50 m butterfly
Silver medal – second place	2008 Manchester	50 m butterfly
Bronze medal – third place	2006 Shanghai	4×100 m medley
European Championships (LC)
Gold medal – first place	2004 Madrid	50 m butterfly
Gold medal – first place	2006 Budapest	50 m butterfly
Silver medal – second place	2008 Eindhoven	50 m butterfly
Summer Universiade
Gold medal – first place	2005 Izmir	50 m butterfly
Gold medal – first place	2005 Izmir	100 m butterfly
Gold medal – first place	2007 Bangkok	50 m butterfly
Silver medal – second place	2003 Daegu	50 m butterfly
Military World Games
Gold medal – first place	2007 Hyderabad	50 m butterfly

Sergiy Breus (born 30 January 1983) is a butterfly swimmer from Ukraine, who won the gold medal in the men's 50 m butterfly at the 2004 European Long Course Championships in Madrid, Spain.
