= Swimming at the 2012 European Aquatics Championships – Men's 200 metre freestyle =

Men's 200 metre freestyle at the 2012 European Aquatics Championships
- Dates: May 22, 2012 (heats and semifinals); May 23, 2012 (final)
- Competitors: 48 from 24 nations
- Winning time: 1:46.27

Medalists
gold medal	Paul Biedermann	Germany
silver medal	Amaury Leveaux	France
bronze medal	Dominik Kozma	Hungary

The men's 100 metre backstroke competition of the swimming events at the 2012 European Aquatics Championships took place May 22 and 23. The heats and semifinals took place on May 22, the final on May 23.

== Records ==
Prior to the competition, the existing world, European and championship records were as follows.

	Name	Nation	Time	Location	Date
World record European record	Paul Biedermann	Germany	1:42.00	Rome	July 28, 2009
Championship record	Pieter van den Hoogenband	Netherlands	1:44.89	Berlin	August 2, 2002

== Results ==
=== Heats ===
48 swimmers participated in 7 heats.

Rank	Heat	Lane	Name	Nationality	Time	Notes
1	7	4	Paul Biedermann	Germany	1:47.39	Q
2	3	7	Dominik Kozma	Hungary	1:47.52	Q
3	6	3	Nimrod Shapira Bar-Or	Israel	1:48.93	Q
4	5	5	Tim Wallburger	Germany	1:49.04	Q
5	5	1	Riccardo Maestri	Italy	1:49.13	Q
6	5	6	Alex di Giorgio	Italy	1:49.21	Q
7	5	3	Viacheslav Andrusenko	Russia	1:49.24	Q
8	6	2	Marco Belotti	Italy	1:49.30	
9	6	6	Gianluca Maglia	Italy	1:49.32	
10	7	2	Pieter Timmers	Belgium	1:49.52	Q
11	7	5	Robert Renwick	Great Britain	1:49.55	Q
12	6	8	Dorde Marković	Serbia	1:49.57	Q
13	5	7	Norbert Trandafir	Romania	1:49.69	Q
14	7	6	Dimitri Colupaev	Germany	1:49.78	
15	7	7	Glenn Surgeloose	Belgium	1:49.88	Q
16	5	2	Pavel Medvetskiy	Russia	1:50.19	Q
17	5	4	Dominik Meichtry	Switzerland	1:50.20	Q
18	7	3	Clemens Rapp	Germany	1:50.29	
19	4	5	Radovan Siljevski	Serbia	1:50.34	Q
20	6	4	Amaury Leveaux	France	1:50.38	Q
21	4	3	Kemal Arda Gural	Turkey	1:50.40	=NR
22	6	7	Lorys Bourelly	France	1:50.45	
23	6	1	Tiago Andre Venancio	Portugal	1:50.56	
24	7	8	Christian Scherübl	Austria	1:50.83	
25	6	5	Jérémy Stravius	France	1:50.91	
26	3	1	Gard Kvale	Norway	1:51.15	
27	3	3	Radoslaw Bor	Poland	1:51.30	
28	4	8	Jean-Baptiste Febo	Switzerland	1:51.34	
29	4	4	Pholien Systermans	Belgium	1:51.49	
30	4	7	Balázs Zámbó	Hungary	1:51.62	
31	3	8	Stefan Šorak	Serbia	1:51.63	
32	4	2	Alexander Selin	Russia	1:51.66	
33	4	1	Uvis Kalnins	Latvia	1:51.68	
34	3	4	Filip Bujoczek	Poland	1:51.71	
35	2	4	Danas Rapšys	Lithuania	1:51.92	
36	3	5	Simonas Bilis	Lithuania	1:52.03	
37	3	6	Květoslav Svoboda	Czech Republic	1:52.10	
38	4	6	Luis Emanuel Vaz	Portugal	1:52.17	
39	7	1	Pawel Werner	Poland	1:52.19	
40	1	5	Evgheni Coroliuc	Moldova	1:52.61	
41	2	2	Jean-François Schneiders	Luxembourg	1:53.71	
42	5	8	Mario Alexandre Pereira	Portugal	1:53.88	
43	2	3	Marco Aldabe-Bomstad	Norway	1:54.34	
44	2	6	Ole-Martin Ree	Norway	1:55.03	
45	1	4	David Gamburg	Israel	1:55.17	
46	3	2	Irakli Revishvili	Georgia	1:55.37	
47	2	7	Aleksandar Nikolov	Bulgaria	1:57.36	
48	1	3	Hedin Olsen	Faroe Islands	2:04.26	
	2	5	Michal Szuba	Poland	DNS	

=== Semifinals ===
The eight fastert swimmers advanced to the final.

==== Semifinal 1 ====
Rank	Lane	Name	Nationality	Time	Notes
1	4	Dominik Kozma	Hungary	1:47.59	Q
2	5	Tim Wallburger	Germany	1:47.90	Q
3	1	Dominik Meichtry	Switzerland	1:48.35	Q
4	8	Amaury Leveaux	France	1:48.38	Q
5	6	Pieter Timmers	Belgium	1:49.25	
6	3	Alex di Giorgio	Italy	1:49.32	Q
7	2	Dorde Marković	Serbia	1:49.69	
8	7	Glenn Surgeloose	Belgium	1:49.79	

==== Semifinal 2 ====
Rank	Lane	Name	Nationality	Time	Notes
1	4	Paul Biedermann	Germany	1:47.92	Q
2	2	Robert Renwick	Great Britain	1:48.89	Q
3	6	Viacheslav Andrusenko	Russia	1:49.03	Q
4	7	Norbert Trandafir	Romania	1:49.57	
5	5	Nimrod Shapira Bar-Or	Israel	1:49.69	
6	8	Radovan Siljevski	Serbia	1:50.11	
7	3	Riccardo Maestri	Italy	1:50.49	
8	1	Pavel Medvetskiy	Russia	1:51.20	

=== Final ===
The final was held at 17:47.

Rank	Lane	Name	Nationality	Time	Notes
1st place, gold medalist(s)	3	Paul Biedermann	Germany	1:46.27	
2nd place, silver medalist(s)	2	Amaury Leveaux	France	1:47.69	
3rd place, bronze medalist(s)	4	Dominik Kozma	Hungary	1:47.72	
4	5	Tim Wallburger	Germany	1:47.75	
5	6	Dominik Meichtry	Switzerland	1:48.53	
6	1	Viacheslav Andrusenko	Russia	1:49.34	
7	8	Alex di Giorgio	Italy	1:49.45	
8	7	Robert Renwick	Great Britain	1:49.57	
