= 2012 FINA World Swimming Championships (25 m) – Men's 4 × 200 metre freestyle relay =

Men's 4 × 200 m Freestyle Relay at the 2012 Short Course Worlds
- Dates: 13 December (heats and final)
- Winning time: 6:51.40

Medalists
| gold medal | United States; Ryan Lochte, Conor Dwyer, Michael Klueh, Matt McLean, Garrett Weber-Gale*, Michael Weiss* |
| silver medal | Australia; Tommaso D'Orsogna, Jarrod Killey, Kyle Richardson, Robert Hurley, Travis Mahoney* |
| bronze medal | Germany; Paul Biedermann, Dimitri Colupaev, Christoph Fildebrandt, Yannick Lebherz; *Indicates the swimmer only competed in the preliminary heats. |

The men's 4 × 200 metre freestyle relay event at the 11th FINA World Swimming Championships (25m) took place 13 December 2012 at the Sinan Erdem Dome.

== Records ==
Prior to this competition, the existing world and championship records were as follows.

| | Nation | Swimmers | Time | Location | Date |
|---|---|---|---|---|---|
| World record Championship record | Russia | Nikita Lobintsev (1:42.10); Danila Izotov (1:42.15); Evgeny Lagunov (1:42.32); Alexander Sukhorukov (1:42.47) | 6:49.04 | Dubai | 16 December 2010 |

No new records were set during this competition.

== Results ==
=== Heats ===
16 teams participated in 2 heats.

| Rank | Heat | Lane | Nation | Swimmers | Time | Notes |
|---|---|---|---|---|---|---|
| 1 | 1 | 4 | Germany | Dimitri Colupaev (1:45.23); Christoph Fildebrandt (1:45.69); Yannick Lebherz (1:43.02); Paul Biedermann (1:44.73) | 6:58.67 | Q |
| 2 | 1 | 5 | Russia | Artem Lobuzov (1:45.29); Yevgeny Lagunov (1:43.81); Dmitri Yermakov (1:45.29); Viatcheslav Andrusenko (1:45.34) | 6:59.73 | Q |
| 3 | 2 | 4 | Australia | Tommaso D'Orsogna (1:44.65); Jarrod Killey (1:46.52); Travis Mahoney (1:46.81); Robert Hurley (1:43.79) | 7:01.77 | Q |
| 4 | 2 | 5 | United States | Garrett Weber-Gale (1:46.62); Michael Klueh (1:44.37); Matt McLean (1:45.45); Michael Weiss (1:45.34) | 7:01.78 | Q |
| 5 | 1 | 3 | Japan | Yuki Kobori (1:45.46); Fumiya Hidaka (1:45.46); Takuro Fujii (1:46.53); Kenta Hirai (1:46.26) | 7:03.43 | Q |
| 6 | 1 | 8 | Italy | Gianluca Maglia (1:46.09); Michele Santucci (1:47.05); Gabriele Detti (1:46.27); Alex di Giorgio (1:45.55) | 7:04.96 | Q |
| 7 | 2 | 8 | Great Britain | Ieuan Lloyd (1:45.26); Chris Walker-Hebborn (1:46.67); Roberto Pavoni (1:48.39); Robert Renwick (1:46.18) | 7:06.50 | Q |
| 8 | 2 | 3 | Brazil | Thiago Simon (1:48.07); Fernando Santos (1:44.41); Vinicius Waked (1:46.86); Samuel Acioli (1:48.06) | 7:07.40 | Q |
| 9 | 1 | 1 | China | Hao Yun (1:45.64); Pu Wenjie (1:46.79); Shi Tengfei (1:49.88); Lü Zhiwu (1:49.59) | 7:11.90 | |
| 10 | 2 | 1 | Canada | Coleman Allen (1:46.63); Zackariah Chetrat (1:48.23); Thomas Gossland (1:48.51); Luke Peddie (1:49.94) | 7:13.31 | |
| 11 | 2 | 6 | Argentina | Martín Naidich (1:49.68); Juan Pereyra (1:49.14); Esteban Paz (1:51.26); Matías Aguilera (1:49.80) | 7:19.88 | NR |
| 12 | 1 | 6 | Singapore | Quah Zheng Wen (1:50.29); Pang Sheng Jun (1:51.24); Ng Kai Wee Rainer (1:51.54); Joseph Schooling (1:50.43) | 7:23.50 | NR |
| 13 | 1 | 2 | Peru | Jesús Monge (1:54.93); Emmanuel Crescimbeni (1:51.76); Enrique Duran (1:54.92); Jusuf Nikola Ustavdich (1:54.37) | 7:35.98 | NR |
| 14 | 1 | 7 | Macau | Ngou Pok Man (1:56.68); Chao Man Hou (1:58.58); Sio Ka Kun (2:05.14); Lao Kuan Fong (1:59.40) | 7:59.80 | |
| 15 | 2 | 2 | India | Sarma S. P. Nair (1:59.39); Rahul Monal Chokshi (2:04.74); Agnishwar Jayaprakash (1:57.92); Neil Himanshu Contractor (2:00.59) | 8:02.64 | |
| 16 | 2 | 7 | Gibraltar | Colin Bensadon (1:55.48); James Sanderson (1:59.86); Oliver Quick (2:07.03); Michael Hitchcock (2:02.55) | 8:04.92 | |
| | 2 | 0 | Venezuela | | DNS | |

=== Final ===
The final was held at 21:04.

| Rank | Lane | Nation | Swimmers | Time | Notes |
|---|---|---|---|---|---|
| 1st place, gold medalist(s) | 6 | United States | Ryan Lochte (1:41.17); Conor Dwyer (1:43.04); Michael Klueh (1:43.20); Matt McLean (1:43.99) | 6:51.40 | |
| 2nd place, silver medalist(s) | 3 | Australia | Tommaso D'Orsogna (1:42.49); Jarrod Killey (1:42.82); Kyle Richardson (1:44.59); Robert Hurley (1:42.39) | 6:52.29 | OC |
| 3rd place, bronze medalist(s) | 4 | Germany | Paul Biedermann (1:41.93); Dimitri Colupaev (1:42.96); Christoph Fildebrandt (1:45.40); Yannick Lebherz (1:42.93) | 6:53.22 | NR |
| 4 | 5 | Russia | Artem Lobuzov (1:44.75); Yevgeny Lagunov (1:43.14); Dmitri Yermakov (1:45.14); Viatcheslav Andrusenko (1:43.94) | 6:56.97 | |
| 5 | 7 | Italy | Andrea D'Arrigo (1:44.90); Alex di Giorgio (1:45.78); Gianluca Maglia (1:44.01); Filippo Magnini (1:44.53) | 6:59.22 | |
| 6 | 2 | Japan | Yuki Kobori (1:45.57); Fumiya Hidaka (1:45.29); Kosuke Hagino (1:44.41); Daiya Seto (1:45.52) | 7:00.79 | AS |
| 7 | 1 | Great Britain | Ieuan Lloyd (1:45.24); Chris Walker-Hebborn (1:46.81); Roberto Pavoni (1:48.04); Robert Renwick (1:45.64) | 7:05.73 | |
| – | 8 | Brazil | Fernando Santos (1:44.75); Vinicius Waked (1:47.22); Thiago Simon; Samuel Acioli | DSQ | |
