= Swimming at the 2011 World Aquatics Championships – Men's 200 metre freestyle =

Men's 200 metre freestyle at the 2011 World Aquatics Championships
- Dates: July 25, 2011 (heats and semifinals); July 26, 2011 (final)
- Competitors: 60 from 51 nations
- Winning time: 1:44.44

Medalists
gold medal	Ryan Lochte	United States
silver medal	Michael Phelps	United States
bronze medal	Paul Biedermann	Germany

The men's 200 metre freestyle competition of the swimming events at the 2011 World Aquatics Championships took place July 25 and 26. The heats and semifinals took place July 25 and the final was held July 26.

== Records ==
Prior to the competition, the existing world and championship records were as follows.

	Name	Nation	Time	Location	Date
World record Championship record	Paul Biedermann	Germany	1:42.00	Rome	July 28, 2009

== Results ==
=== Heats ===
60 swimmers participated in 8 heats, qualified swimmers are listed:

Rank	Heat	Lane	Name	Nationality	Time	Notes
1	7	4	Ryan Lochte	United States	1:46.34	Q
2	7	3	Sebastiaan Verschuren	Netherlands	1:46.53	Q
3	8	5	Paul Biedermann	Germany	1:46.56	Q
4	8	4	Park Tae-Hwan	South Korea	1:46.63	Q
5	7	5	Michael Phelps	United States	1:46.98	Q
6	6	4	Yannick Agnel	France	1:47.11	Q
7	7	7	Dominik Meichtry	Switzerland	1:47.38	Q
8	8	1	Ross Davenport	Great Britain	1:47.59	Q
9	8	3	Danila Izotov	Russia	1:47.72	Q
10	7	8	Shaune Fraser	Cayman Islands	1:47.73	Q
11	6	6	Robert Renwick	Great Britain	1:47.88	Q
12	5	3	Nimrod Shapira Bar-Or	Israel	1:48.11	Q
13	7	1	Yuki Kobori	Japan	1:48.19	Q
14	6	5	Nikita Lobintsev	Russia	1:48.28	Q
15	5	8	Nicolas Oliveira	Brazil	1:48.33	Q
16	8	6	Kenrick Monk	Australia	1:48.42	Q
17	8	2	Tim Wallburger	Germany	1:48.43	
18	6	7	Gianluca Maglia	Italy	1:48.54	
19	6	1	Sho Uchida	Japan	1:48.64	
20	6	8	Marco Belotti	Italy	1:48.66	
21	5	5	Markus Rogan	Austria	1:48.82	
22	6	3	Thomas Fraser-Holmes	Australia	1:48.86	
23	4	3	Matthew Stanley	New Zealand	1:48.93	
24	7	2	Li Yunqi	China	1:48.94	
25	7	6	Jean Basson	South Africa	1:48.95	
26	8	8	Glenn Surgeloose	Belgium	1:48.96	
27	5	6	Chad Bobrosky	Canada	1:49.01	
28	5	7	Cristian Quintero	Venezuela	1:49.27	
29	6	2	Jiang Haiqi	China	1:49.43	
30	8	7	Joost Reijns	Netherlands	1:49.56	
31	3	5	Wong Kai Wai David	Hong Kong	1:49.58	
32	5	2	Mads Glæsner	Denmark	1:49.59	
33	5	1	Benjamin Hockin	Paraguay	1:49.85	
34	4	5	Dominik Straga	Croatia	1:51.35	
35	4	4	Radovan Siljevski	Serbia	1:51.42	
36	3	2	Uvis Kalnins	Latvia	1:52.20	
37	4	2	Robin Andreasson	Sweden	1:52.21	
38	5	4	Ryan Pini	Papua New Guinea	1:52.23	
39	4	6	Mateo de Angulo	Colombia	1:52.25	
40	4	7	Jessie Lacuna	Philippines	1:52.27	
41	3	4	Martín Kutscher	Uruguay	1:52.49	
42	4	1	Danny Yeo	Singapore	1:52.54	
43	3	7	Mario Montoya	Costa Rica	1:52.64	
44	4	8	Raúl Martínez	Puerto Rico	1:52.93	
45	3	1	Sebastián Jahnsen Madico	Peru	1:53.68	
46	3	6	Irakli Revishvili	Georgia	1:54.02	
47	2	4	Nicholas Schwab	Dominican Republic	1:54.95	
48	2	5	Matthew Abeysinghe	Sri Lanka	1:55.33	NR
48	3	3	Phạm Thành Nguyện	Vietnam	1:55.33	
50	2	2	Allan Gutierrez	Honduras	1:56.74	
51	2	3	Emanuele Nicolini	San Marino	1:57.23	
52	2	7	Quinton Delie	Namibia	1:57.47	
53	3	8	Mohamed Madouh	Kuwait	1:57.64	
54	2	6	Jemal Le Grand	Aruba	1:58.24	
55	1	4	Obaid Al Jasmi	United Arab Emirates	1:58.49	
56	2	1	Gebrel Ahmed	Palestine	2:02.27	
57	2	8	Mathieu Marquet	Mauritius	2:02.41	
58	1	5	Paul Elaisa	Fiji	2:03.95	
59	1	3	Anderson Lim	Brunei	2:06.40	
60	1	6	Ryan Givinden	Seychelles	2:18.07	

=== Semifinals ===
The semifinal were held at 18:57.

==== Semifinal 1 ====
Rank	Lane	Name	Nationality	Time	Notes
1	3	Yannick Agnel	France	1:45.62	Q
2	5	Park Tae-Hwan	South Korea	1:46.23	Q
3	1	Nikita Lobintsev	Russia	1:47.34	Q
4	4	Sebastiaan Verschuren	Netherlands	1:47.52	
5	6	Ross Davenport	Great Britain	1:47.76	
6	8	Kenrick Monk	Australia	1:47.86	
7	2	Shaune Fraser	Cayman Islands	1:48.46	
8	7	Nimrod Shapira Bar Or	Israel	1:48.59	

==== Semifinal 2 ====
Rank	Lane	Name	Nationality	Time	Notes
1	5	Paul Biedermann	Germany	1:45.93	Q
2	4	Ryan Lochte	United States	1:46.11	Q
3	3	Michael Phelps	United States	1:46.91	Q
4	6	Dominik Meichtry	Switzerland	1:47.30	Q
5	2	Danila Izotov	Russia	1:47.39	Q
6	7	Robert Renwick	Great Britain	1:47.89	
7	8	Nicolas Oliveira	Brazil	1:48.18	
8	1	Yuki Kobori	Japan	1:48.65	

=== Final ===
The final was held at 18:02.

Rank	Lane	Name	Nationality	Time	Notes
1st place, gold medalist(s)	3	Ryan Lochte	United States	1:44.44	
2nd place, silver medalist(s)	2	Michael Phelps	United States	1:44.79	
3rd place, bronze medalist(s)	5	Paul Biedermann	Germany	1:44.88	
4	6	Park Tae-Hwan	South Korea	1:44.92	
5	4	Yannick Agnel	France	1:44.99	NR
6	1	Nikita Lobintsev	Russia	1:46.57	
7	7	Dominik Meichtry	Switzerland	1:47.02	
8	8	Danila Izotov	Russia	1:47.46	
