= Swimming at the 2011 World Aquatics Championships – Men's 4 × 200 metre freestyle relay =

Men's 4×200 metre freestyle relay at the 2011 World Aquatics Championships
- Dates: July 29, 2011 (heats and final)
- Competitors: 72 from 16 nations
- Winning time: 7:02.67

Medalists
| gold medal | Michael Phelps; Peter Vanderkaay; Ricky Berens; Ryan Lochte | United States |
| silver medal | Yannick Agnel; Grégory Mallet; Jérémy Stravius; Fabien Gilot | France |
| bronze medal | Wang Shun; Zhang Lin; Li Yunqi; Sun Yang | China |

The men's 4×200 metre freestyle relay competition of the swimming events at the 2011 World Aquatics Championships was held on July 29, 2011 with the heats and final.

== Records ==
Prior to the competition, the existing world and championship records were as follows.

| | Name | Nation | Time | Location | Date |
|---|---|---|---|---|---|
| World record Championship record | Michael Phelps (1:44.49); Ricky Berens (1:44.13); David Walters (1:45.47); Ryan Lochte (1:44.46) | United States | 6:58.55 | Rome | July 31, 2009 |

== Results ==
=== Heats ===
16 nations participated in 3 heats.

| Rank | Heat | Lane | Nation | Swimmers | Time | Notes |
|---|---|---|---|---|---|---|
| 1 | 3 | 4 | United States | David Walters (1:48.01); Conor Dwyer (1:47.31); Ricky Berens (1:46.99); Peter Vanderkaay (1:46.53) | 7:08.84 | Q |
| 2 | 3 | 3 | Japan | Takeshi Matsuda (1:47.57); Yoshihiro Okumura (1:47.64); Sho Uchida (1:48.57); Shogo Hihara (1:46.68) | 7:10.46 | Q |
| 3 | 2 | 5 | France | Jérémy Stravius (1:47.49); Grégory Mallet (1:47.98); Sébastien Rouault (1:49.61); Yannick Agnel (1:46.52) | 7:11.60 | Q |
| 4 | 1 | 5 | Australia | Kenrick Monk (1:48.77); Tommaso D'Orsogna (1:48.14); Jarrod Killey (1:47.19); Ryan Napoleon (1:47.70) | 7:11.80 | Q |
| 5 | 2 | 6 | Italy | Gianluca Maglia (1:49.00); Filippo Magnini (1:46.97); Marco Belotti (1:48.17); Samuel Pizzetti (1:48.04) | 7:12.18 | Q |
| 6 | 1 | 4 | China | Wang Shun (1:48.04); Zhang Lin (1:46.98); Jiang Yuhui (1:49.90); Li Yunqi (1:47.27) | 7:12.19 | Q |
| 7 | 2 | 3 | Great Britain | David Carry (1:47.96); Ross Davenport (1:48.08); Jak Scott (1:49.26); Robert Renwick (1:47.85) | 7:13.15 | Q |
| 8 | 3 | 5 | Germany | Tim Wallburger (1:48.05); Yannick Lebherz (1:49.46); Clemens Rapp (1:49.34); Paul Biedermann (1:46.46) | 7:13.31 | Q |
| 9 | 2 | 7 | Austria | David Brandl (1:48.95); Christian Scherübl (1:48.35); Markus Rogan (1:48.04); Dinko Jukić (1:48.00) | 7:13.34 | |
| 10 | 1 | 3 | Canada | Blake Worsley (1:48.69); Colin Russell (1:49.20); Chad Bobrosky (1:48.05); Stefan Hirniak (1:47.79) | 7:13.73 | |
| 11 | 2 | 4 | Russia | Danila Izotov (1:48.04); Yevgeny Lagunov (1:48.60); Artem Lobuzov (1:48.76); Alexander Sukhorukov (1:48.72) | 7:14.12 | |
| 12 | 3 | 6 | South Africa | Darian Townsend (1:47.98); Jean Basson (1:48.67); Jan Venter (1:49.85); Sebastien Rousseau (1:49.15) | 7:15.65 | |
| 13 | 1 | 6 | Belgium | Dieter Dekoninck (1:49.77); Glenn Surgeloose (1:49.07); Mathieu Fonteyn (1:50.77); Pieter Timmers (1:47.78) | 7:17.39 | NR |
| 14 | 1 | 2 | Brazil | Nicolas Oliveira (1:49.47); André Schultz (1:50.32); Rodrigo Castro (1:49.72); João de Lucca (1:48.93) | 7:18.44 | |
| 15 | 3 | 2 | Venezuela | Daniele Tirabassi (1:49.48); Crox Acuña (1:49.80); Ricardo Monasterio (1:54.13); Cristian Quintero (1:48.34) | 7:21.75 | |
| 16 | 3 | 7 | Czech Republic | Jan Šefl (1:51.64); Michal Rubáček (1:51.79); Martin Verner (1:49.82); Květoslav Svoboda (1:51.21) | 7:24.46 | NR |
| – | 2 | 2 | South Korea | | DNS | |

=== Final ===
The final was held at 19:41.

| Rank | Lane | Nation | Swimmers | Time | Notes |
|---|---|---|---|---|---|
| 1st place, gold medalist(s) | 4 | United States | Michael Phelps (1:45.53); Peter Vanderkaay (1:46.07); Ricky Berens (1:46.51); Ryan Lochte (1:44.56) | 7:02.67 | |
| 2nd place, silver medalist(s) | 3 | France | Yannick Agnel (1:45.25); Grégory Mallet (1:46.81); Jérémy Stravius (1:45.40); Fabien Gilot (1:47.35) | 7:04.81 | NR |
| 3rd place, bronze medalist(s) | 7 | China | Wang Shun (1:47.09); Zhang Lin (1:46.14); Li Yunqi (1:47.30); Sun Yang (1:45.14) | 7:05.67 | NR |
| 4 | 8 | Germany | Paul Biedermann (1:45.20); Tim Wallburger (1:47.70); Christoph Fildebrandt (1:48.16); Benjamin Starke (1:47.26) | 7:08.32 | |
| 5 | 6 | Australia | Thomas Fraser-Holmes (1:48.35); Kenrick Monk (1:45.84); Jarrod Killey (1:48.01); Ryan Napoleon (1:46.28) | 7:08.48 | |
| 6 | 1 | Great Britain | Ross Davenport (1:47.31); David Carry (1:47.47); Jak Scott (1:48.78); Robert Renwick (1:47.28) | 7:10.84 | |
| 7 | 5 | Japan | Takeshi Matsuda (1:47.37); Shogo Hihara (1:46.87); Yuki Kobori (1:47.74); Yoshihiro Okumura (1:48.94) | 7:10.92 | |
| 8 | 2 | Italy | Gianluca Maglia (1:48.57); Filippo Magnini (1:47.54); Marco Belotti (1:47.97); Samuel Pizzetti (1:48.18) | 7:12.26 | |
