= 2012 FINA World Swimming Championships (25 m) – Men's 200 metre freestyle =

Men's 200m Freestyle at the 2012 Short Course Worlds
- Dates: 12 December (heats and final)
- Winning time: 1:41.92

Medalists
gold medal	Ryan Lochte	United States
silver medal	Paul Biedermann	Germany
bronze medal	Conor Dwyer	United States

The men's 200 metre freestyle event at the 11th FINA World Swimming Championships (25m) took place 12 December 2012 at the Sinan Erdem Dome.

== Records ==
Prior to this competition, the existing world and championship records were as follows.

	Name	Nation	Time	Location	Date
World record	Paul Biedermann	Germany	1:39.37	Berlin	15 November 2009
Championship record	Ryan Lochte	United States	1:41.08	Dubai	15 December 2010

No new records were set during this competition.

== Results ==
=== Heats ===
88 swimmers participated in 10 heats.

Rank	Heat	Lane	Name	Time	Notes
1	9	6	Ryan Lochte (USA)	1:42.41	Q
2	9	5	Viatcheslav Andrusenko (RUS)	1:43.98	Q
3	10	4	Paul Biedermann (GER)	1:44.05	Q
4	10	6	Matthew Stanley (NZL)	1:44.13	Q
5	9	4	Jarrod Killey (AUS)	1:44.33	Q
6	10	3	Conor Dwyer (USA)	1:44.61	Q
7	10	5	Dimitri Colupaev (GER)	1:44.84	Q
7	10	7	Ben Hockin (PAR)	1:44.84	Q, NR
9	8	0	Devon Myles Brown (RSA)	1:44.89	
10	10	9	Leith Shankland (RSA)	1:44.91	
11	9	3	Dominik Meichtry (SUI)	1:44.92	
12	10	1	Dominik Kozma (HUN)	1:44.97	
13	8	5	Fernando Santos (BRA)	1:45.11	
14	2	7	Hao Yun (CHN)	1:45.13	
15	10	2	Andrea D'Arrigo (ITA)	1:45.15	
16	7	3	Ahmed Mathlouthi (TUN)	1:45.19	
17	9	8	Anders Lie Nielsen (DEN)	1:45.45	
18	9	1	Daniel Skaaning (DEN)	1:45.56	
19	8	9	Velimir Stjepanović (SRB)	1:45.60	
20	8	4	Artem Lobuzov (RUS)	1:45.67	
20	8	1	Ieuan Lloyd (GBR)	1:45.67	
22	8	2	Yuki Kobori (JPN)	1:45.86	
23	8	6	Alex di Giorgio (ITA)	1:45.87	
24	9	2	Kemal Arda Gürdal (TUR)	1:46.09	
25	8	8	Lorys Bourelly (FRA)	1:46.90	
26	7	5	Coleman Allen (CAN)	1:46.92	
27	9	0	Serhiy Frolov (UKR)	1:47.02	
28	8	3	Robert Renwick (GBR)	1:47.24	
29	9	9	Doğa Çelik (TUR)	1:47.27	
30	7	4	Kenta Hirai (JPN)	1:47.35	
31	10	8	Ewan Jackson (NZL)	1:47.54	
32	9	7	Vinicius Waked (BRA)	1:47.95	
33	7	6	Arseni Kukharau (BLR)	1:48.68	
34	7	7	Anton Goncharov (UKR)	1:48.86	
35	7	1	Filip Zaborowski (POL)	1:48.87	
36	6	5	Esteban Enderica (ECU)	1:49.10	
37	6	3	Irakli Revishvili (GEO)	1:49.11	
38	1	4	Shi Tengfei (CHN)	1:49.37	
39	10	0	Thomas Gossland (CAN)	1:49.43	
40	5	6	Jemal Le Grand (ARU)	1:50.93	
41	7	0	Hoàng Quý Phước (VIE)	1:50.94	
42	4	4	Pang Sheng Jun (SIN)	1:51.24	NR
43	7	2	Matthew Abeysinghe (SRI)	1:51.44	
44	6	2	David Sikharulidze (GEO)	1:51.55	
45	8	7	Gal Nevo (ISR)	1:51.80	
46	6	1	Radhames Kalaf (DOM)	1:51.88	NR
47	6	8	Christoph Meier (LIE)	1:52.22	
48	7	8	Arturo Pérez Vertti (MEX)	1:52.36	
49	6	6	Khurshidjon Tursunov (UZB)	1:52.64	
50	7	9	Stanislav Karnaukhov (KGZ)	1:52.70	
51	6	7	Sobitjon Amilov (UZB)	1:52.86	
52	2	0	Andrew Rutherfurd (BOL)	1:53.33	NR
53	5	5	José Montoya (CRC)	1:53.34	
54	6	9	Andrew Chetcuti (MLT)	1:53.46	NR
55	2	8	Mohammed Madouh (KUW)	1:53.57	NR
56	2	1	Jessie Lacuna (PHI)	1:54.18	
57	5	4	Welliam Maksi (SYR)	1:54.55	
58	6	0	Jesús Monge (PER)	1:54.84	
59	4	7	Sean Gunn (ZIM)	1:54.89	
60	5	3	Quinton Delie (NAM)	1:55.46	
61	5	9	Iacovos Hadjiconstantinou (CYP)	1:55.48	
62	6	4	Aleksander Slepchenko (KGZ)	1:55.70	
63	5	8	Edward Caruana Dingli (MLT)	1:55.82	
64	4	3	Christian Selby (BAR)	1:56.01	
65	4	5	Mathieu Marquet (MRI)	1:57.07	
66	5	0	Fernando Medrano (NCA)	1:57.20	
67	4	6	Ahmed Salam Al-Dulaimi (IRQ)	1:57.30	
68	4	8	Paul Elaisa (FIJ)	1:57.54	
69	3	5	Khader Baqleh (JOR)	1:58.41	
70	3	4	Adam Viktora (SEY)	1:58.95	
71	5	2	Jaywant Arcot Vijaykumar (IND)	1:59.36	
72	5	7	Abdoul Khadre Mbaye Niane (SEN)	1:59.89	
73	5	1	Johnny Rivera (GUM)	2:00.16	
74	4	0	Anderson Lim (BRU)	2:00.74	
75	4	1	Bakr Salam Ali (IRQ)	2.00.15	
76	4	9	Michael Hitchcock (GIB)	2:00.82	
77	3	6	Israr Hussain (PAK)	2:04.42	
78	4	2	Oliver Quick (GIB)	2:04.72	
79	3	3	Zachary Payne (COK)	2:05.34	
80	3	7	Noah Al-Khulaifi (QAT)	2:07.02	
81	3	0	Azim Azimov (TKM)	2:09.02	
82	3	1	Franc Aleksi (ALB)	2:09.36	
83	3	9	Sirish Gurung (NEP)	2:10.11	
84	2	5	Brandon Schuster (SAM)	2:10.19	
85	3	2	Farhan Farhan (BHR)	2:10.26	
86	1	5	Mamadou Soumaré (MLI)	2:10.52	
87	2	6	Shawn Dingilius-Wallace (PLW)	2:21.27	
88	2	4	Naser Hassan (QAT)	2:24.20	
	1	3	Daniele Tirabassi (VEN)	DNS	
	2	2	Yousef Al-Askari (KUW)	DNS	
	2	3	Nikolas Sylvester (VIN)	DNS	
	3	8	Tano Pierre Claver Atta (CIV)	DNS	

=== Final ===
The final was held at 19:00.

Rank	Lane	Name	Nationality	Time	Notes
1st place, gold medalist(s)	4	Ryan Lochte	United States	1:41.92	
2nd place, silver medalist(s)	3	Paul Biedermann	Germany	1:42.07	
3rd place, bronze medalist(s)	7	Conor Dwyer	United States	1:43.78	
4	2	Jarrod Killey	Australia	1:44.04	
5	8	Ben Hockin	Paraguay	1:44.24	NR
6	6	Matthew Stanley	New Zealand	1:44.55	
7	5	Viatcheslav Andrusenko	Russia	1:44.68	
8	1	Dimitri Colupaev	Germany	1:45.38	
