= Swimming at the 2012 European Aquatics Championships – Men's 4 × 200 metre freestyle relay =

Men's 4 × 200 metre freestyle relay at the 2012 European Aquatics Championships
- Dates: May 26, 2012 (heats and final)
- Competitors: 51 from 12 nations
- Winning time: 7:09.17

Medalists
gold medal	Paul Biedermann; Dimitri Colupaev; Clemens Rapp; Tim Wallburger	Germany
silver medal	Gianluca Maglia; Riccardo Maestri; Samuel Pizzetti; Filippo Magnini	Italy
bronze medal	Dominik Kozma; Gergő Kis; Péter Bernek; László Cseh	Hungary

The men's 4 × 200 metre freestyle relay competition of the swimming events at the 2012 European Aquatics Championships took place May 26.

== Records ==
Prior to the competition, the existing world, European and championship records were as follows.

	Nation	Time	Location	Date
World record	United States	6:58.55	Rome	July 31, 2009
European record	Russia	6:59.15	Rome	July 31, 2009
Championship record	Russia	7:06.71	Budapest	August 14, 2010

== Results ==
=== Heats ===
12 nations participated in 2 heats.

Rank	Heat	Lane	Name	Nationality	Time	Notes
1	2	7	Alex Di Giorgio; Marco Belotti; Gianluca Maglia; Samuel Pizzetti	Italy	7:15.67	Q
2	1	5	Tim Wallburger; Dimitri Colupaev; Clemens Rapp; Paul Biedermann	Germany	7:15.77	Q
3	1	2	Dominik Kozma; Gergő Kis; Péter Bernek; László Cseh	Hungary	7:18.84	Q
4	2	6	Yoris Grandjean; Glenn Surgeloose; Louis Croenen; Pieter Timmers	Belgium	7:19.48	Q
5	1	4	Stefan Šorak; Dorde Marković; Velimir Stjepanović; Radovan Siljevski	Serbia	7:19.91	Q, NR
6	2	4	Pavel Medvetskiy; Alexander Selin; Evgeny Kulikov; Viacheslav Andrusenko	Russia	7:22.44	Q
7	2	2	David Karasek; Dominik Meichtry; Alexandre Liess; Jean-Baptiste Febo	Switzerland	7:22.48	Q
8	1	3	David Brandl; Christian Scherübl; Markus Rogan; Dinko Jukić	Austria	7:23.75	Q
9	2	3	Tiago Venâncio; Diogo Carvalho; Luis Emanuel Vaz; Mario Alexandre Pereira	Portugal	7:24.22	
10	1	6	Michal Poprawa; Radoslaw Bor; Filip Bujoczek; Pawel Werner	Poland	7:24.93	
11	1	7	Tomas Havránek; Martin Verner; Květoslav Svoboda; Jan Šefl	Czech Republic	7:27.47	
12	2	5	Gard Kvale; Marco Aldabe-Bomstad; Ole Martin Ree; Sindri Thor Jakobsson	Norway	7:33.64	

=== Final ===
The final was held at 18:48.

Rank	Lane	Name	Nationality	Time	Notes
1st place, gold medalist(s)	5	Paul Biedermann; Dimitri Colupaev; Clemens Rapp; Tim Wallburger	Germany	7:09.17	
2nd place, silver medalist(s)	4	Gianluca Maglia; Riccardo Maestri; Samuel Pizzetti; Filippo Magnini	Italy	7:13.10	
3rd place, bronze medalist(s)	3	Dominik Kozma; Gergő Kis; Péter Bernek; László Cseh	Hungary	7:13.60	
4	6	Dieter Dekoninck; Glenn Surgeloose; Louis Croenen; Pieter Timmers	Belgium	7:15.58	NR
5	8	David Brandl; Markus Rogan; Christian Scherübl; Dinko Jukić	Austria	7:19.32	
6	7	Viacheslav Andrusenko; Pavel Medvetskiy; Alexander Selin; Evgeny Kulikov	Russia	7:19.45	
7	2	Dorde Marković; Stefan Šorak; Velimir Stjepanović; Radovan Siljevski	Serbia	7:20.20	
8	1	David Karasek; Dominik Meichtry; Alexandre Liess; Jean-Baptiste Febo	Switzerland	7:22.30	NR
