= Swimming at the 2012 European Aquatics Championships – Men's 4 × 100 metre freestyle relay =

Men's 4 × 100 metre freestyle relay at the 2012 European Aquatics Championships
- Dates: May 21, 2012 (heats and final)
- Competitors: 46 from 10 nations
- Winning time: 3:13.55

Medalists
gold medal	Amaury Leveaux; Alain Bernard; Frédérick Bousquet; Jérémy Stravius	France
silver medal	Andrea Rolla; Marco Orsi; Michele Santucci; Filippo Magnini	Italy
bronze medal	Vitaly Syrnikov; Oleg Tikhobaev; Nikita Konovalov; Viacheslav Andrusenko	Russia

The men's 4 × 100 metre freestyle relay competition of the swimming events at the 2012 European Aquatics Championships took place May 21. The heats and final took place on May 21.

== Records ==
Prior to the competition, the existing world, European and championship records were as follows.

	Nation	Time	Location	Date
World record	United States	3:08.24	Beijing	August 11, 2008
European record	France	3:08.32	Beijing	August 11, 2008
Championship record	Russia	3:12.46	Budapest	August 9, 2010

== Results ==
=== Heats ===
10 nations participate in 2 heats.

Rank	Heat	Lane	Name	Nationality	Time	Notes
1	2	5	Dieter Dekoninck; Pieter Timmers; Emmanuel Vanluchene; Yoris Grandjean	Belgium	3:16.14	Q, NR
2	2	3	Markus Deibler; Steffen Deibler; Dimitri Colupaev; Marco di Carli	Germany	3:16.82	Q
3	2	2	Alain Bernard; Medhy Metella; Lorys Bourelly; Jérémy Stravius	France	3:16.90	Q
4	1	5	Gianluca Maglia; Luca Leonardi; Andrea Rolla; Michele Santucci	Italy	3:18.10	Q
5	1	4	Vitaly Syrnikov; Oleg Tikhobaev; Viacheslav Andrusenko; Nikita Konovalov	Russia	3:18.20	Q
6	1	6	Dominik Kozma; László Cseh; Péter Bernek; Krisztián Takács	Hungary	3:18.40	Q
7	1	2	Stefan Nystrand; Lars Frölander; Petter Stymne; Mattias Carlsson	Sweden	3:18.95	Q
8	2	6	Flori Lang; Dominik Meichtry; Daniel Rast; Aurelien Künzi	Switzerland	3:20.23	Q
9	2	4	Radovan Siljevski; Boris Stojanović; Velimir Stjepanović; Ivan Lenđer	Serbia	3:21.93	NR
10	1	3	Gard Kvale; Lavrans Solli; Sverre Naess; Ole Martin Ree	Norway	3:25.50	NR

=== Final ===
The final was held at 18:18.

Rank	Lane	Name	Nationality	Time	Notes
1st place, gold medalist(s)	3	Amaury Leveaux; Alain Bernard; Frédérick Bousquet; Jérémy Stravius	France	3:13.55	
2nd place, silver medalist(s)	6	Andrea Rolla; Marco Orsi; Michele Santucci; Filippo Magnini	Italy	3:14.71	
3rd place, bronze medalist(s)	2	Vitaly Syrnikov; Oleg Tikhobaev; Nikita Konovalov; Viacheslav Andrusenko	Russia	3:15.13	
4	4	Emmanuel Vanluchene; Jasper Aerents; Dieter Dekoninck; Pieter Timmers	Belgium	3:15.34	NR
5	1	Stefan Nystrand; Petter Stymne; Lars Frölander; Mattias Carlsson	Sweden	3:17.12	
6	7	Dominik Kozma; László Cseh; Péter Bernek; Krisztián Takács	Hungary	3:17.23	NR
7	5	Christoph Fildebrandt; Markus Deibler; Dimitri Colupaev; Marco di Carli	Germany	3:17.55	
8	8	Dominik Meichtry; Flori Lang; Daniel Rast; Aurelien Künzi	Switzerland	3:20.00	
