= Swimming at the 2009 World Aquatics Championships – Men's 4 × 200 metre freestyle relay =

Men's 4×200 metre freestyle relay at the 2009 FINA World Championships
- Venue: Foro Italico
- Date: 31 July 2009
- Teams: 30
- Winning time: 6:58.55 WR

Medalists
gold medal	United States; Michael Phelps, Ricky Berens, David Walters, Ryan Lochte, Daniel Madwed*, Davis Tarwater*, Peter Vanderkaay*
silver medal	Russia; Nikita Lobintsev, Mikhail Polischuk, Danila Izotov, Alexander Sukhorukov, Yevgeny Lagunov*, Sergei Perunin*
bronze medal	Australia; Kenrick Monk, Robert Hurley, Tommaso D'Orsogna, Patrick Murphy, Nic Ffrost*, Kirk Palmer* * Swimmers who participated in the heats only

The men's 4×200 metre freestyle relay at the 2009 World Championships took place on July 31, 2009 at the Foro Italico in Rome, Italy. 30 countries entered the event, of which 27 swam.

== Records ==
Prior to this competition, the existing world and competition records were as follows:

World Record	United States (USA); Michael Phelps (1:43.31); Ryan Lochte (1:44.28); Ricky Berens (1:46.29); Peter Vanderkaay (1:44.68)	6:58.56	Beijing, China	13 August 2008
Championship Record	United States (USA); Michael Phelps (1:45.36); Ryan Lochte (1:45.86); Klete Keller (1:46.31); Peter Vanderkaay (1:45.71)	7:03.24	Melbourne, Australia	30 March 2007

The following records were established during the competition:

Date	Round	Nation	Time	Record
31 July	Final	United States; Michael Phelps (1:44.49); Ricky Berens (1:44.13); David Walters (1:45.47); Ryan Lochte (1:44.46)	6:58.55	WR

== Results ==
=== Heats ===
Rank	Heat	Lane	Nation	Swimmers	Time	Notes
1	3	4	United States	Ricky Berens (1:44.95); Daniel Madwed (1:45.63); Davis Tarwater (1:47.94); Peter Vanderkaay (1:44.78)	7:03.30	
1	3	3	Japan	Shogo Hihara (1:46.75); Yoshihiro Okumura (1:44.73); Shunsuke Kuzuhara (1:46.41); Takeshi Matsuda (1:45.41)	7:03.30	AS
3	1	4	Australia	Nic Ffrost (1:46.93); Robert Hurley (1:45.96); Kirk Palmer (1:46.65); Tommaso D'Orsogna (1:46.02)	7:05.56	
4	3	6	Germany	Paul Biedermann (1:44.02); Felix Wolf (1:48.25); Yannick Lebherz (1:47.54); Clemens Rapp (1:45.81)	7:05.62	
5	1	5	Great Britain	Robert Renwick (1:46.11) NR; Andrew Hunter (1:46.85); David Davies (1:46.77); David Carry (1:46.38)	7:06.11	
6	2	4	Russia	Yevgeny Lagunov (1:48.30); Mikhail Polischuk (1:44.93); Sergei Perunin (1:46.53); Alexander Sukhorukov (1:46.68)	7:06.44	
7	2	3	South Africa	Jean Basson (1:45.99); Darian Townsend (1:46.22); Jan Albert Venter (1:47.78); Sebastien Rousseau (1:48.02)	7:08.01	AF
8	3	5	Italy	Cesare Sciocchetti (1:47.81); Massimiliano Rosolino (1:48.26); Gianluca Maglia (1:45.60); Damiano Lestingi (1:46.40)	7:08.07	
9	2	6	Hungary	László Cseh (1:45.78) NR; Péter Bernek (1:47.88); Zoltán Povázsay (1:47.99); Gergő Kis (1:46.59)	7:08.24	NR
10	3	2	Brazil	Thiago Pereira (1:46.57) SA; Rodrigo Castro (1:48.23); Lucas Salatta (1:48.48); Nicolas Oliveira (1:46.43)	7:09.71	SA
11	2	5	Canada	Colin Russell (1:47.81); Stefan Hirniak (1:45.62); Blake Worsley (1:48.71); Joel Greenshields (1:47.77)	7:09.91	
12	1	6	Poland	Paweł Korzeniowski (1:46.59); Konrad Czerniak (1:47.49); Lukasz Wojt (1:48.25); Pawel Rupak (1:49.77)	7:12.10	
13	2	2	Portugal	Cesar Faria (1:49.30); Jorge Maia (1:49.67); Diogo Carvalho (1:48.83); Fabio Pereira (1:48.68)	7:16.48	NR
14	2	0	Belgium	Glenn Surgeloose (1:49.66); Pholien Systermans (1:48.94); Stef Verachten (1:49.48); Yoris Grandjean (1:49.35)	7:17.43	NR
15	1	3	China	Sun Yang (1:51.30); Xin Tong (1:50.27); Shi Tengfei (1:49.54); Chen Zuo (1:49.39)	7:20.50	
16	1	2	Venezuela	Daniele Tirabassi (1:49.77); Roberto Gomez (1:51.31); Alejandro Gómez (1:51.03); Crox Acuna (1:48.45)	7:20.56	NR
17	1	9	Switzerland	David Karasek (1:49.46); Dominik Meichtry (1:48.67); Duncan Furrer (1:53.00); Simon Rabold (1:51.50)	7:22.63	NR
18	3	7	Kazakhstan	Artur Dilman (1:54.76); Oleg Rabota (1:51.64); Stanislav Kuzmin (1:53.70); Dmitriy Gordiyenko (1:52.98)	7:33.08	
19	1	7	Uzbekistan	Petr Romashkin (1:53.01); Danil Bugakov (1:53.47); Sobitjon Amilov (1:54.29); Daniil Tulupov (1:53.94)	7:34.71	
20	2	1	Chinese Taipei	Hsu Chi-Chieh (1:52.70); Chien Jui-Ting (1:53.37); Pan Kai-Wen (1:55.63); Lin Kuan-Ting (1:55.13)	7:36.83	
21	2	7	Singapore	Danny Yeo (1:57.33); Lim Wen Hao Joshua (1:52.67); Tan Xue Wei Nicholas (1:53.98); Lim Clement (1:54.56)	7:38.54	
22	1	1	India	Mandar Divase (2:00.23); Virdhawal Khade (2:01.54); Rehan Poncha (2:04.98); Ashwin Menon (2:01.09)	8:07.84	
23	2	8	United Arab Emirates	Mohammed Al Ghaferi (2:00.57); Ali Al Kaabi (2:02.70); Mubarak Al Besher (2:04.63); Obaid Al Jasmi (1:59.99)	8:07.89	NR
24	3	8	Macau	Antonio Tong (2:00.51); Lao Kuan Fong (2:02.52); Wong Wing Cheung Victor (2:01.88); Ngou Pok Man (2:03.72)	8:08.63	
25	2	9	Malta	Neil Agius (1:59.92) dEdward Caruana Dingli (2:03.55); Mark Sammut (2:04.69); Andrea Agius (2:03.50)	8:11.66	
26	3	0	Albania	Endi Babi (1:58.90); Mario Sulkja (2:14.21); Jon Pepaj (2:07.03); Sidni Hoxha (2:05.19)	8:25.33	
27	1	8	Northern Mariana Islands	Eli Ebenezer Wong (2:02.46); Cooper Graf (2:16.29); Shin Kimura (2:15.07); Kailan Staal (2:01.92)	8:35.74	
–	1	0	Croatia		DNS	
–	3	1	Kuwait		DNS	
–	3	9	Czech Republic		DNS	

=== Final ===
Rank	Lane	Nation	Swimmers	Time	Note
1st place, gold medalist(s)	4	United States	Michael Phelps (1:44.49); Ricky Berens (1:44.13); David Walters (1:45.47); Ryan Lochte (1:44.46)	6:58.55	WR
2nd place, silver medalist(s)	7	Russia	Nikita Lobintsev (1:45.10); Mikhail Polischuk (1:45.42); Danila Izotov (1:44.48); Alexander Sukhorukov (1:44.15)	6:59.15	ER
3rd place, bronze medalist(s)	3	Australia	Kenrick Monk (1:46.00); Robert Hurley (1:46.47); Tommaso D'Orsogna (1:44.82); Patrick Murphy (1:44.36)	7:01.65	OC
4	5	Japan	Sho Uchida (1:45.90); Yoshihiro Okumura (1:45.83); Shogo Hihara (1:45.99); Takeshi Matsuda (1:44.54)	7:02.26	AS
5	6	Germany	Paul Biedermann (1:42.81); Felix Wolf (1:47.65); Yannick Lebherz (1:47.31); Clemens Rapp (1:45.42)	7:03.19	NR
6	8	Italy	Emiliano Brembilla (1:46.29) NR; Gianluca Maglia (1:45.85); Marco Belotti (1:45.46); Filippo Magnini (1:45.88)	7:03.48	NR
7	2	Great Britain	Robert Renwick (1:45.99) NR; Robert Bale (1:47.18); David Carry (1:46.41); Ross Davenport (1:46.09)	7:05.67	NR
8	1	South Africa	Jean Basson (1:46.13); Darian Townsend (1:46.81); Jan Albert Venter (1:47.13); Sebastien Rousseau (1:48.44)	7:08.51	

== See also ==
- Swimming at the 2008 Summer Olympics – Men's 4 × 200 metre freestyle relay
