= Swimming at the 2013 World Aquatics Championships – Men's 4 × 200 metre freestyle relay =

Men's 4 × 200 metre freestyle relay at the 2013 World Aquatics Championships
- Venue: Palau Sant Jordi
- Dates: August 2, 2013 (heats & final)
- Competitors: 72 from 18 nations
- Winning time: 7:01.72

Medalists
gold medal	Conor Dwyer; Ryan Lochte; Charlie Houchin; Ricky Berens	United States
silver medal	Danila Izotov; Nikita Lobintsev; Artem Lobuzov; Alexander Sukhorukov	Russia
bronze medal	Wang Shun; Hao Yun; Li Yunqi; Sun Yang	China

Barcelona Palau San Jordi

The men's 4 × 200 metre freestyle relay event in swimming at the 2013 World Aquatics Championships took place on 2 August at the Palau Sant Jordi in Barcelona, Spain.

== Records ==
Prior to this competition, the existing world and championship records were:

World record	United States (USA); Michael Phelps (1:44.49); Ricky Berens (1:44.13); David Walters (1:45.47); Ryan Lochte (1:44.46)	6:58.55	Rome, Italy	31 July 2009
Competition record	United States (USA); Michael Phelps (1:44.49); Ricky Berens (1:44.13); David Walters (1:45.47); Ryan Lochte (1:44.46)	6:58.55	Rome, Italy	31 July 2009

== Results ==
=== Heats ===
The heats were held at 11:11.

Rank	Heat	Lane	Name	Nationality	Time	Notes
1	2	4	Matt McLean (1:47.63); Michael Klueh (1:47.70); Charlie Houchin (1:45.66); Ricky Berens (1:47.06)	United States	7:08.05	Q
2	1	6	Danila Izotov (1:47.50); Nikita Lobintsev (1:46.82); Artem Lobuzov (1:47.69); Alexander Sukhorukov (1:47.86)	Russia	7:09.87	Q
3	2	6	Takeshi Matsuda (1:47.92); Sho Sotodate (1:46.46); Yuki Kobori (1:47.57); Daiya Seto (1:48.03)	Japan	7:09.98	Q
4	1	4	Yannick Agnel (1:47.65); Lorys Bourelly (1:48.04); Grégory Mallet (1:48.37); Jérémy Stravius (1:46.60)	France	7:10.66	Q
5	1	2	Glenn Surgeloose (1:48.57); Emmanuel Vanluchenne (1:48.18); Dieter Dekoninck (1:47.66); Pieter Timmers (1:46.28)	Belgium	7:10.69	Q, NR
6	1	5	Dimitri Colupaev (1:48.48); Clemens Rapp (1:47.33); Markus Deibler (1:48.67); Yannick Lebherz (1:46.58)	Germany	7:11.06	Q
7	1	3	James Guy (1:48.08); Robert Renwick (1:47.65); Ieuan Lloyd (1:48.85); Josh Walsh (1:48.42)	Great Britain	7:13.00	Q
8	2	5	Wang Shun (1:47.96); Hao Yun (1:47.45); Lü Zhiwu (1:50.04); Li Yunqi (1:47.92)	China	7:13.37	Q
9	2	3	David McKeon (1:49.27); Ned McKendry (1:48.32); Alexander Graham (1:49.10); Jarrod Killey (1:46.83)	Australia	7:13.52	
10	2	2	Alex di Giorgio (1:48.60); Marco Belotti (1:47.93); Damiano Lestingi (1:48.83); Filippo Magnini (1:48.24)	Italy	7:13.60	
11	2	1	Nicolas Oliveira (1:47.93); Fernando Santos (1:49.21); João de Lucca (1:47.96); Vinícius Waked (1:50.87)	Brazil	7:15.97	
12	2	7	Blake Worsley (1:49.06); Alec Page (1:48.46); Aly Abdel Khalik (1:49.33); Hassaan Abdel Khalik (1:50.32)	Canada	7:17.17	
13	2	0	Víctor Martín (1:49.72); Marc Sánchez (1:49.55); Albert Puig (1:48.43); Gerard Rodríguez (1:49.89)	Spain	7:17.59	NR
14	1	7	Jan Świtkowski (1:48.67); Dawid Ziełinski (1:49.33); Filip Bujoczek (1:49.96); Michał Poprawa (1:51.11)	Poland	7:19.07	
15	1	1	Marwan Ismail (1:50.62); Mohamed Khaled (1:53.29); Ahmed Akram (1:52.53); Mohamed Gadallah (1:55.16)	Egypt	7:31.60	NR
16	1	0	Doğa Çelik (1:55.73); Nezır Karap (1:54.27); Furkan Marasli (1:52.48); Kemal Arda Gürdal (1:49.89)	Turkey	7:32.37	
17	1	8	Jeong Jeong-Soo (1:51.78); Jang Sang-Jin (1:51.23); Ju Jang-Hun (1:55.97); Im Tae-Jeong (1:53.85)	South Korea	7:32.83	
18	2	8	Miguel Gutierrez (1:54.36); Ramiro Ramírez (1:54.97); Ezequiel Trujillo (1:55.43); Arturo Pérez Vertti (1:53.75)	Mexico	7:38.51	

=== Final ===
The final was held at 19:41.

Rank	Lane	Name	Nationality	Time	Notes
1st place, gold medalist(s)	4	Conor Dwyer (1:45.76); Ryan Lochte (1:44.98); Charlie Houchin (1:45.59); Ricky Berens (1:45.39)	United States	7:01.72	
2nd place, silver medalist(s)	5	Danila Izotov (1:45.14); Nikita Lobintsev (1:46.23); Artem Lobuzov (1:46.16); Alexander Sukhorukov (1:46.39)	Russia	7:03.92	
3rd place, bronze medalist(s)	8	Wang Shun (1:47.41); Hao Yun (1:47.25); Li Yunqi (1:46.92); Sun Yang (1:43.16)	China	7:04.74	NR
4	6	Yannick Agnel (1:45.44); Lorys Bourelly (1:47.45); Grégory Mallet (1:46.61); Jérémy Stravius (1:45.41)	France	7:04.91	
5	3	Kosuke Hagino (1:45.93); Sho Sotodate (1:46.74); Yuki Kobori (1:46.69); Takeshi Matsuda (1:45.59)	Japan	7:04.95	
6	7	Clemens Rapp (1:47.80); Markus Deibler (1:48.63); Dimitri Colupaev (1:47.66); Yannick Lebherz (1:45.98)	Germany	7:10.07	
7	2	Glenn Surgeloose (1:48.45); Emmanuel Vanluchenne (1:48.09); Dieter Dekoninck (1:46.91); Pieter Timmers (1:47.70)	Belgium	7:11.15	
8	1	James Guy (1:47.19); Robert Renwick (1:46.86); Jak Scott (1:48.31); Josh Walsh (1:49.64)	Great Britain	7:12.00	
