= Conor Dwyer =

American swimmer (born 1989)

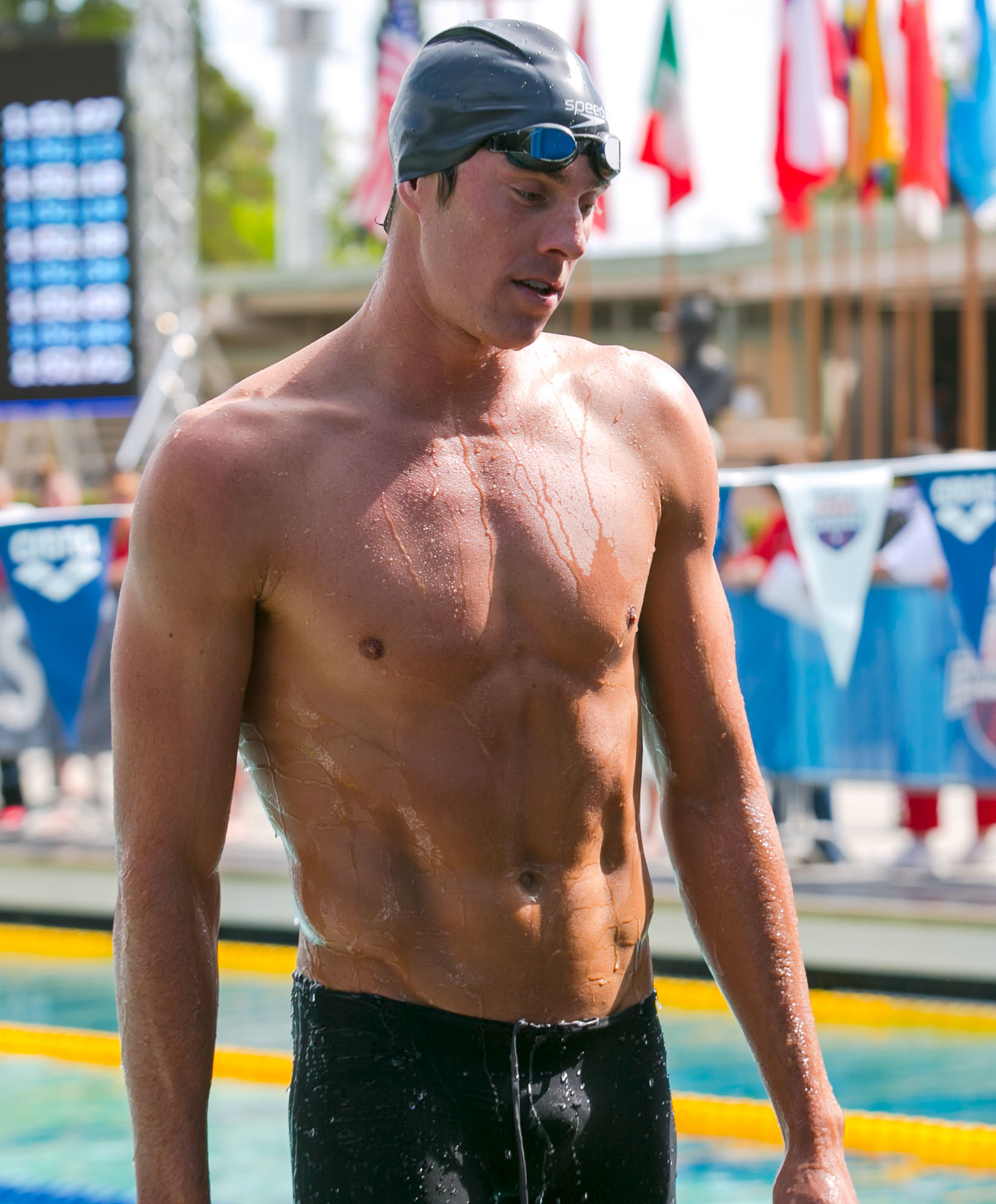
- Dwyer in 2017

Personal information
- Full name: Conor James Dwyer
- National team: United States
- Born: January 10, 1989 (age 37) Winnetka, Illinois, U.S.
- Height: 1.96 m (6 ft 5 in)
- Weight: 89 kg (196 lb)

Sport
- Sport: Swimming
- Strokes: Freestyle, individual medley
- Club: Lake Forest Swim Club; Gator Swim Club; North Baltimore Aquatic Club
- College team: University of Iowa; University of Florida
Medal record
Men's swimming
Representing the United States
Olympic Games
Gold medal – first place	2012 London	4×200 m freestyle
Gold medal – first place	2016 Rio de Janeiro	4×200 m freestyle
Bronze medal – third place	2016 Rio de Janeiro	200 m freestyle
World Championships (LC)
Gold medal – first place	2011 Shanghai	4×200 m freestyle
Gold medal – first place	2013 Barcelona	4×200 m freestyle
Gold medal – first place	2015 Kazan	4×100 m mixed freestyle
Silver medal – second place	2013 Barcelona	200 m freestyle
Silver medal – second place	2013 Barcelona	4×100 m freestyle
Silver medal – second place	2015 Kazan	4×200 m freestyle
Bronze medal – third place	2017 Budapest	4x200 m freestyle
World Championships (SC)
Gold medal – first place	2012 Istanbul	4×200 m freestyle
Gold medal – first place	2014 Doha	4×200 m freestyle
Bronze medal – third place	2012 Istanbul	200 m freestyle
Pan Pacific Championships
Gold medal – first place	2014 Gold Coast	4×200 m freestyle
Pan American Games
Gold medal – first place	2011 Guadalajara	4×200 m freestyle
Silver medal – second place	2011 Guadalajara	200 m medley
Silver medal – second place	2011 Guadalajara	400 m medley
Silver medal – second place	2011 Guadalajara	4×100 m freestyle
Representing the Florida Gators
Event	1st	2nd	3rd
NCAA Championships	3	1	1
Total	3	1	1
By race
Event	1st	2nd	3rd
200 y freestyle	1	0	0
500 y freestyle	1	0	1
4×200 y freestyle	1	1	0
Total	3	1	1
NCAA Championships
Gold medal – first place	2010 Columbus	200 y freestyle
Gold medal – first place	2010 Columbus	500 y freestyle
Gold medal – first place	2011 Minneapolis	4×200 y freestyle
Silver medal – second place	2010 Columbus	4×200 y freestyle
Bronze medal – third place	2011 Minneapolis	500 y freestyle

Conor James Dwyer (born January 10, 1989) is a former American competition swimmer and Olympic gold medalist. He competed in freestyle and medley events, and won a gold medal as a member of the winning U.S. 4×200-meter freestyle relay team at the 2012 Summer Olympics. In total, he has won seventeen medals in major international competitions: nine gold, six silver, and two bronze spanning the Summer Olympics, the FINA World Championships, the Pan Pacific Championships, and the Pan American Games.

On 11 October 2019 it was announced by the United States Anti-Doping Agency that Dwyer had failed a series of anti-doping tests in late 2018. It had been found that he had banned anabolic steroids, namely testosterone in the form of pellets, surgically inserted into his body. Dwyer was banned for 20 months and was expected to miss the 2020 Summer Olympics before the outbreak of the COVID-19 pandemic. He announced his retirement from competitive swimming shortly after the suspension was announced.

== Early years ==
Dwyer was born in Evanston, Illinois, the son of Patrick and Jeanne Dwyer. His mother was an All-American swimmer for the Florida State Seminoles swimming team and continues to teach swimming lessons to this day. Dwyer is the second oldest of five children in his family, including PJ, Pati, Brendan, and his twin brother Spencer. Spencer is a personal trainer who has trained the likes of Chance the Rapper.

He grew up in Winnetka, Illinois, and attended Loyola Academy, a Catholic high school in Wilmette, Illinois, where he swam for the Loyola Academy Ramblers high school swim team for four years. As a senior team captain, he was the league champion in the 200-yard freestyle (1:44.03) and runner-up in 500-yard freestyle (4:45.15), received all-section and all-league honors, and was his team's most valuable swimmer. In addition to swimming, he played baseball, lacrosse and water polo. In water polo, he earned third-team all-state and first-team all-section, all-region and all-league honors. He graduated from Loyola in 2007.

== Swimming career ==
=== Collegiate ===
Dwyer first attended the University of Iowa and swam for the Iowa Hawkeyes swimming and diving team in National Collegiate Athletic Association (NCAA) and Big Ten Conference competition during the 2007–08 and 2008–09 seasons. After his second year, he transferred to the University of Florida, where he swam for coach Gregg Troy's Florida Gators swimming and diving team in NCAA and Southeastern Conference (SEC) competition during the 2009–10 and 2010–11 seasons. In 2010, he won individual titles at the NCAA national championships in the 200-yard and 500-yard freestyle, and was honored as the NCAA Swimmer of the Year in 2010 and 2011. Dwyer was named SEC Swimmer of the Year in both 2010 and 2011. Dwyer finished his college career with twelve All-American honors and three NCAA titles (two individual and one relay). He graduated from the University of Florida with a bachelor's degree in business administration in 2011.

=== 2010–11 ===
At the 2010 ConocoPhillips United States National Championships in Irvine, California, Dwyer qualified for the U.S. national team in the 4×200-meter freestyle relay by finishing fifth in the 200-meter freestyle. Dwyer also placed fifth in the 200-meter individual medley and sixth in the 400-meter freestyle.

At the 2011 World Aquatics Championships in Shanghai, China, Dwyer swam in the heats of the 4×200-meter freestyle relay and earned a gold medal when the United States won in the final. Teaming with David Walters, Ricky Berens, and Peter Vanderkaay, Dwyers swam the second leg and recorded a time of 1:47.31.

At the 2011 ConocoPhillips United States National Championships in Palo Alto, California, Dwyer won the 200-meter individual medley and placed second in the 400-meter individual medley.

Shortly after the 2011 National Championships, Dwyer competed at the 2011 Pan American Games held in Guadalajara, Mexico. At the competition, he won four medals (one gold, three silver) which included two individual silver medals.

=== 2012 Summer Olympics ===
At the 2012 United States Olympic Trials in Omaha, Nebraska, the qualifying meet for the Olympics, Dwyer made the U.S. Olympic team for the first time by finishing second behind Peter Vanderkaay in the 400-meter freestyle with a time of 3:47.83. During the last 100 meters of the 400-meter freestyle, he split a 56.81 seconds that helped him edge out Michael Klueh and Charlie Houchin for the second spot. Dwyer also qualified for the 4×200-meter freestyle relay by finishing fourth in the 200-meter freestyle behind Michael Phelps, Ryan Lochte and Ricky Berens. Dwyer capped the trials with a third-place finish in the 200-meter individual medley finishing again behind Phelps and Lochte. During the 2012 Olympic Trials, Dwyer achieved personal bests in all of the events in which he competed.

At the 2012 Summer Olympics in London, Dwyer swam his first race in the men's 400-meter freestyle. In the heats of the 400-meter freestyle, Dwyer achieved a personal best of 3:46.24 (with his prior being 3:47.83) to qualify for the final. In the final of the 400-meter freestyle, Dwyer placed fifth with a time of 3:46.39, slightly slower than the time he posted in the heats. In his second and last event, the 4×200-meter freestyle relay, Dwyer earned a gold medal when the U.S. team placed first in the final with a time of 6:59.70. Teaming with Ryan Lochte, Ricky Berens and Michael Phelps, Dwyer swam the second leg in a time of 1:45.23.

=== 2013 World Championships ===
At the 2013 World Aquatics Championships in Barcelona, Spain, Dwyer earned his first medal, a silver, by swimming for the U.S. team in the preliminary heats of the 4×100-meter freestyle relay. Swimming the anchor leg in the heats, Dwyer recorded a time of 48.36. In his first individual event, the 200-meter freestyle, Dwyer won silver behind Frenchman Yannick Agnel, recording a personal best time of 1:45.32. At the 150-meter mark, Dwyer was in fifth place, but had a final 50 split of 26.59 to grab the second spot. His final 50 was the fastest among the field. In the 4×200-meter freestyle relay, Dwyer combined with Ryan Lochte, Charlie Houchin, and Ricky Berens, with the team finishing in first place. Swimming the lead-off, Dwyer recorded a split of 1:45.76, and the team finished with a final time of 7:01.72.

=== 2016 Olympics ===
At the Olympic trials Dwyer placed second in both the 200m and 400m freestyle, qualifying him for the Olympic team in both those individual events.

At the 2016 Olympics, Dwyer started off the program coming 4th in the 400 freestyle missing out in a medal despite qualifying fastest from the heats. Dwyer was again part of the US 4 × 200 m freestyle team that won gold, leading off the relay in the final to teammates Townley Haas, Ryan Lochte and Michael Phelps. Dwyer also won a bronze medal in the 200 m freestyle individual event after a late surge, behind Sun Yang and Chad le Clos.

=== 2019 Swimming ban and retirement ===
In October 2019, Dwyer was handed a 20-month competitive ban after testing positive for an anabolic agent by the U.S. Anti-Doping Agency (USADA).

The American Arbitration Association found that Dwyer consulted on health issues with his trainer Reardon and obstetrician-gynecologist Dana Russo, and the latter concluded his testosterone levels were in the 5th percentile. Thereafter, Dwyer was using a hormone therapy product BioTe, plant-derived testosterone, that were implanted as pellets beneath the skin in October 2018.

Russo told the arbitration panel that she had asked someone on the United States Olympic & Paralympic Committee if the treatment was allowed, but the person could not be identified.

Months after commencing the hormone treatment in October 2018, Dwyer was informed that he had tested positive for an anabolic agent in 3 out-of-competition drug tests. He announced his retirement from swimming shortly after the 20-month suspension was announced by the USADA in October 2019, after the arbitration panel concluded the results.

== Personal bests (long course) ==
As of August 8, 2016

Event	Time	Venue	Date
100 m freestyle	48.94	Indianapolis	June 25, 2013
200 m freestyle	1:45.23	Rio de Janeiro	August 8, 2016
400 m freestyle	3:43.42	Rio de Janeiro	August 6, 2016
200 m individual medley	1:57.74	Indianapolis	June 29, 2013
400 m individual medley	4:15.39	Santa Clara	June 1, 2013

== Personal bests (short course) ==
Event	Time	Venue	Date
200 m individual medley	1:53.03	Berlin	August 8, 2013
400 m individual medley	3:59.90	Berlin	August 7, 2013

== Modeling career ==
In addition to swimming professionally, Dwyer is also an internationally signed model. In 2019, Dwyer was the face of Philippine-based international clothing brand BENCH's men's wear campaign in the United States and North America.

== See also ==
- List of Olympic medalists in swimming (men)
- List of University of Florida alumni
- List of University of Florida Olympians
- List of World Aquatics Championships medalists in swimming (men)
