= 2014 FINA World Swimming Championships (25 m) – Men's 4 × 200 metre freestyle relay =

Men's 4 × 200 metre freestyle relay at the 2014 FINA World Swimming Championships (25 m)
- Dates: 3 December
- Competitors: 60 from 15 nations
- Winning time: 6:51.68

Medalists
gold medal	Conor Dwyer; Ryan Lochte; Matt McLean; Tyler Clary; Michael Klueh; Michael Weiss; Darian Townsend	United States
silver medal	Andrea Mitchell D'Arrigo; Marco Belotti; Nicolangelo Di Fabio; Filippo Magnini	Italy
bronze medal	Myles Brown; Sebastien Rousseau; Chad le Clos; Leith Shankland; Calvyn Justus	South Africa

The men's 4 × 200 metre freestyle relay competition of the 2014 FINA World Swimming Championships (25 m) was held on 4 December.

== Records ==
Prior to the competition, the existing world and championship records were as follows.

	Nation	Time	Location	Date
World record Championship record	Russia	6:49.04	Dubai	16 December 2010

== Results ==
=== Heats ===
The heats were held at 11:54.

Rank	Heat	Lane	Nation	Swimmers	Time	Notes
1	1	6	Italy	Andrea Mitchell D'Arrigo (1:43.45); Marco Belotti (1:43.97); Nicolangelo Di Fabio (1:43.84); Filippo Magnini (1:43.44)	6:54.70	Q
2	1	5	United States	Matt McLean (1:43.65); Michael Klueh (1:43.94); Michael Weiss (1:44.19); Darian Townsend (1:43.25)	6:55.03	Q
3	1	7	Brazil	João de Lucca (1:42.02); Gustavo Godoy (1:44.22); Fernando Santos (1:44.24); Gabriel Ogawa (1:45.02)	6:55.50	Q, SA
4	1	1	Russia	Artem Lobuzov (1:43.85); Dmitrii Ermakov (1:44.39); Aleksandr Krasnykh (1:44.41); Viacheslav Andrusenko (1:44.07)	6:56.72	Q
5	2	7	Belgium	Emmanuel Vanluchene (1:44.74); Glenn Surgeloose (1:43.57); Louis Croenen (1:44.61); Pieter Timmers (1:43.98)	6:56.90	Q
6	1	2	South Africa	Myles Brown (1:43.41); Leith Shankland (1:44.54); Calvyn Justus (1:45.89); Sebastien Rousseau (1:44.19)	6:58.03	Q
7	2	3	Denmark	Daniel Skaaning (1:45.47); Frederik Pedersen (1:45.62); Frans Johannessen (1:44.43); Anders Nielsen (1:43.13)	6:58.65	Q
8	2	1	Germany	Markus Deibler (1:44.60); Clemens Rapp (1:44.14); Florian Vogel (1:44.99); Tim Wallburger (1:45.67)	6:59.40	Q
9	1	4	Japan	Yuki Kobori (1:45.43); Reo Sakata (1:44.28); Tsubasa Amai (1:45.66); Katsumi Nakamura (1:44.06)	6:59.43	AS
10	2	2	Austria	David Brandl (1:45.42); Felix Auboeck (1:43.90); Sebastian Steffan (1:46.03); Jakub Maly (1:47.35)	7:02.70	
11	1	3	Czech Republic	Jan Šefl (1:45.41); David Kunčar (1:46.55); Pavel Janeček (1:45.81); Jan Micka (1:47.72)	7:05.49	
12	2	6	China	Hou Mingda (1:48.18); Jiang Yuhui (1:47.40); Jiang Tiansheng (1:51.86); Lin Yongqing (1:45.20)	7:12.64	
13	2	5	Argentina	Guido Buscaglia (1:49.69); Martín Naidich (1:50.04); Matías Aguilera (1:47.19); Federico Grabich (1:46.61)	7:13.53	
14	2	0	Paraguay	Ben Hockin (1:44.44); Charles Hockin (1:49.38); Matías López (1:50.94); Max Abreu (1:51.20)	7:15.96	
15	2	4	Philippines	Fahad Alkhaldi (1:48.86); Axel Ngui (1:52.90); Jethro Chua (1:53.31); Jessie Lacuna (1:50.39)	7:25.46	
—	1	8	Serbia		DNS	
—	2	8	Australia		DNS	

=== Final ===
The final was held at 20:00.

Rank	Lane	Nation	Swimmers	Time	Notes
1st place, gold medalist(s)	5	United States	Conor Dwyer (1:43.20); Ryan Lochte (1:42.42); Matt McLean (1:43.20); Tyler Clary (1:42.86)	6:51.68	
2nd place, silver medalist(s)	4	Italy	Andrea Mitchell D'Arrigo (1:42.77); Marco Belotti (1:43.98); Nicolangelo Di Fabio (1:42.98); Filippo Magnini (1:42.07)	6:51.80	
3rd place, bronze medalist(s)	7	South Africa	Myles Brown (1:43.25); Sebastien Rousseau (1:43.96); Chad le Clos (1:40.61); Leith Shankland (1:44.31)	6:52.13	
4	2	Belgium	Louis Croenen (1:44.91); Glenn Surgeloose (1:43.29); Emmanuel Vanluchene (1:42.33); Pieter Timmers (1:42.13)	6:52.66	
5	3	Brazil	João de Lucca (1:41.85 SA); Gustavo Godoy (1:44.82); Fernando Santos (1:43.89); Gabriel Ogawa (1:43.97)	6:54.53	SA
6	8	Germany	Markus Deibler (1:43.68); Florian Vogel (1:44.24); Tim Wallburger (1:45.81); Clemens Rapp (1:43.67)	6:57.40	
7	1	Denmark	Anders Nielsen (1:44.49); Frans Johannessen (1:45.34); Frederik Pedersen (1:45.60); Daniel Skaaning (1:45.35)	7:00.78	
DSQ	6	Russia	Mikhail Polischuk (1:43.62); Danila Izotov (1:40.65); Artem Lobuzov (1:42.87); Viacheslav Andrusenko (1:44.82)	~~6:51.96~~	
