= Amaury Leveaux =

French swimmer (born 1985)

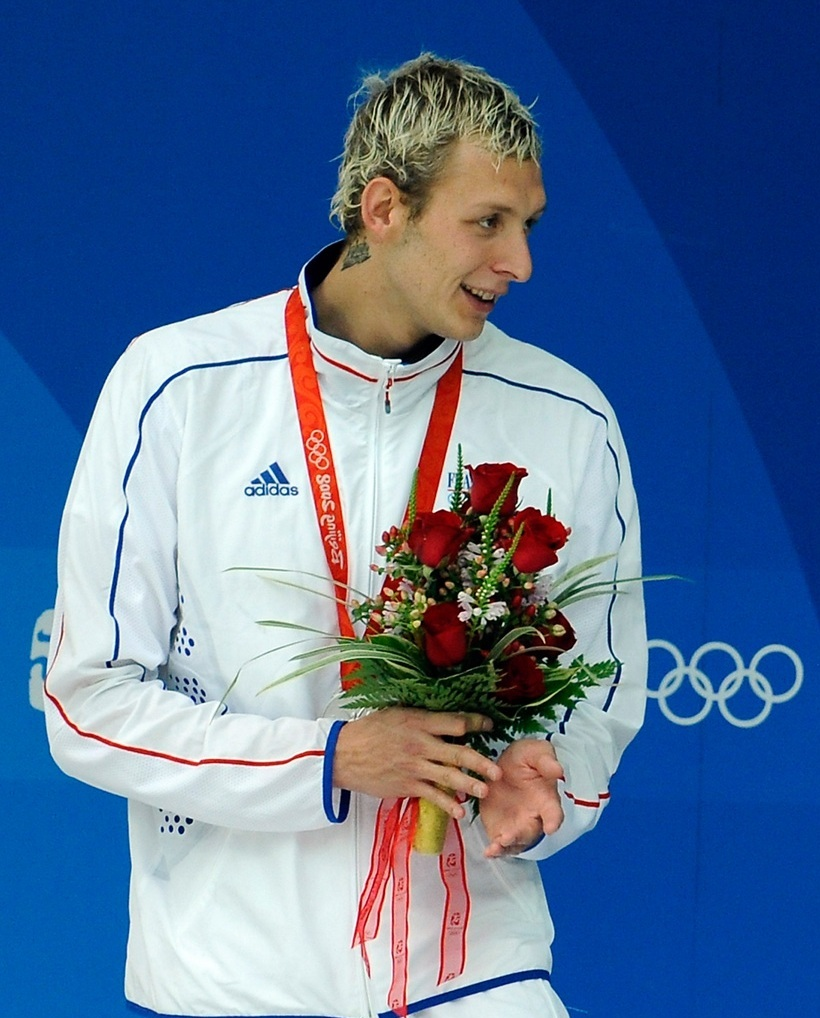
- Amaury Leveaux on winning the silver medal in the 50 m at the 2008 Olympics

Personal information
- Full name: Amaury Raymond Leveaux
- Nationality: France
- Born: 2 December 1985 (age 40) Delle, France
- Height: 2.02 m (6 ft 8 in)
- Weight: 96 kg (212 lb)

Sport
- Sport: Swimming
- Strokes: Freestyle, butterfly
- Club: Lagardère Paris Racing
Medal record
Men's swimming
Representing France
Olympic Games
Gold medal – first place	2012 London	4×100 m freestyle
Silver medal – second place	2008 Beijing	50 m freestyle
Silver medal – second place	2008 Beijing	4×100 m freestyle
Silver medal – second place	2012 London	4×200 m freestyle
World Championships (LC)
Gold medal – first place	2013 Barcelona	4×100 m freestyle
Bronze medal – third place	2007 Melbourne	4×100 m freestyle
Bronze medal – third place	2009 Rome	50 m freestyle
Bronze medal – third place	2009 Rome	4×100 m freestyle
European Championships (LC)
Gold medal – first place	2012 Debrecen	4×100 m freestyle
Silver medal – second place	2006 Budapest	100 m butterfly
Silver medal – second place	2008 Eindhoven	200 m freestyle
Silver medal – second place	2010 Budapest	4×100 m freestyle
Silver medal – second place	2012 Debrecen	200 m freestyle
Bronze medal – third place	2004 Madrid	4×100 m freestyle
Bronze medal – third place	2004 Madrid	4×200 m freestyle
Bronze medal – third place	2006 Budapest	4×100 m freestyle
European Championships (SC)
Gold medal – first place	2008 Rijeka	50 m freestyle
Gold medal – first place	2008 Rijeka	100 m freestyle
Gold medal – first place	2008 Rijeka	50 m butterfly
Gold medal – first place	2008 Rijeka	4×50 m freestyle
Gold medal – first place	2009 Istanbul	100 m freestyle
Gold medal – first place	2009 Istanbul	4×50 m freestyle
Gold medal – first place	2012 Chartres	4×50 m freestyle
Gold medal – first place	2012 Chartres	4×50 m mixed freestyle
Silver medal – second place	2011 Szczecin	50 m butterfly
Bronze medal – third place	2009 Istanbul	4×50 m medley
Mediterranean Games
Gold medal – first place	2005 Almería	4×100 m freestyle
Gold medal – first place	2009 Pescara	4×100 m freestyle
Bronze medal – third place	2005 Almería	200 m freestyle
Bronze medal – third place	2005 Almería	4×200 m freestyle

Amaury Raymond Leveaux (born 2 December 1985) is a French swimmer from Delle, Territoire de Belfort. Leveaux is a former world record holder in the 100 m freestyle (short course – 44.94 sec), the 50 m freestyle (short course – 20.48 sec), and the 50 m butterfly (short course – 22.18 sec). He also formerly held the national record in the 200 m freestyle (long course – 1:46.54).

== Career ==
Up to 2003, Leveaux competed in the junior categories, and was runner-up in the 100 m freestyle and the 100 m butterfly in the European Championships in Glasgow in 2003. Having previously dominated the French junior championships, Leveaux took the silver in the 50 m butterfly event in the French open championship in 2003 held in Saint-Étienne.

In 2004, Leveaux won his first gold medal in the French Championships in the 200 m freestyle, while also taking the silver in the 100 m freestyle event. He was later chosen to join the French national swimming squad for the European Championships held in Madrid, where he helped the French relay team win the bronze medal in the 4×100 and 4 × 200 m freestyle events. In the individual 200 m freestyle event, Leveaux came in fifth, breaking his first French record with 1 min 48.80 seconds. Three months later, Leveaux competed on the relay team in the Athens games, in the 4×100 and 4 × 200 m freestyle events. Although the team failed to qualify for the final in the 4×100 m, the team came in seventh place in the 4 × 200 m.

Leveaux was the runner-up in the 100 m freestyle at the 2005 French National Championships, and participated in the World Championships in Montréal in July, he qualified for the final in the 100 m freestyle, but came in at eighth place. In 2006, he became national champion in the 100 m butterfly and European runner-up – he came in behind the Ukrainian Andriy Serdinov in Budapest.

At the French national championships, Leveaux managed to qualify for the 2008 Summer Olympics in the 50 m and 200 m freestyle events. Finishing fifth in the 100 m, he also qualified for the 4 × 100 m freestyle relay team. He set an Olympic record in the 100 m freestyle in the heats of the relay after leading off. France finished second in the final and Leveaux thus won a silver medal. Later in the week, Leveaux set an Olympic record in his preliminary 50 m freestyle heat with a time of 21.46 seconds. In the final of that event, he swam even faster (21.45 seconds) but finished behind Brazil's César Cielo Filho to take the silver medal.

At the 2008 European short course championships, Amaury Leveaux broke the world record in the men's 100 m freestyle, recording a time of 44.94 seconds. This record was broken by Kyle Chalmers in 2021.

After a couple of years spent in far from his best form, Amaury Leveaux made a comeback at the 2012 European Championship in Debrecen (Hungary). He won the 4 × 100 m freestyle relay with teammates Alain Bernard, Frédérick Bousquet and Jérémy Stravius. He also won a silver medal in the 200 m freestyle (1:47.69). At the 2012 Olympics in London, he was the lead swimmer of the 4 × 100 m freestyle relay, winning gold with teammates Fabien Gilot, Clement Lefert and Yannick Agnel, and of the 4 × 200 m freestyle relay, winning silver.

At the 2013 World Championships in Barcelona, he earned a gold medal after swimming in the heats of the 4 × 100 m freestyle but was not included in the team for the final.

In December 2013, at age 28, he announced his retirement from competitive swimming. However, in September 2018, he announced his comeback to competitive swimming, targeting a gold medal at the 2020 Tokyo Olympic Games in the 50 m freestyle. He now plans to swim at USC with coach Dave Salo.

== See also ==
- World record progression 50 metres freestyle
- World record progression 100 metres freestyle

Records
Preceded by Roland Schoeman	Men's 50 metres freestyle world record holder (short course); 11 December 2008 – 8 August 2009	Succeeded by Roland Schoeman
Preceded by Alain Bernard	Men's 100 metres freestyle world record holder (short course); 12 December 2008 – 29 October 2021	Succeeded by Kyle Chalmers
Preceded by Matt Jaukovic	Men's 50 metres butterfly world record holder (short course); 6 December 2008 – 14 November 2009	Succeeded by Steffen Deibler
