= Florian Janistyn =

Austrian swimmer

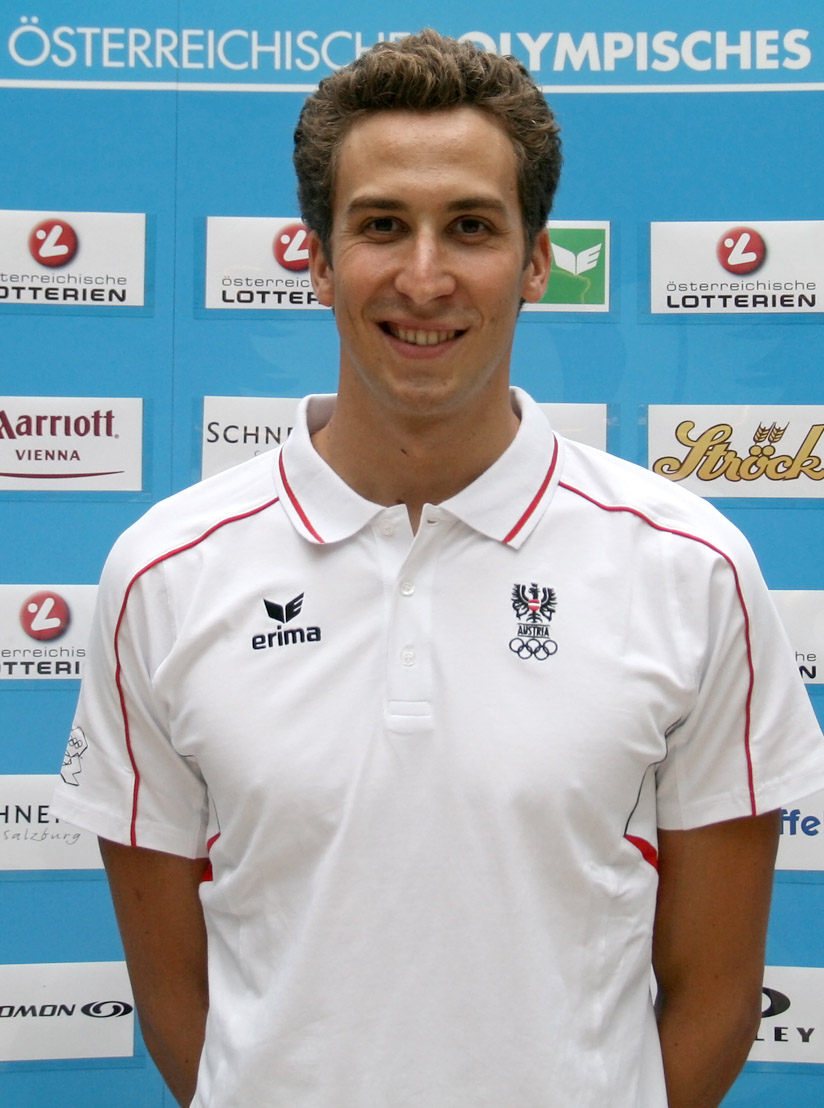

Personal information
- Full name: Florian Janistyn
- National team: Austria
- Born: 22 April 1988 (age 38) Vienna, Austria
- Height: 1.90 m (6 ft 3 in)
- Weight: 77 kg (170 lb)

Sport
- Sport: Swimming
- Strokes: Freestyle
- Club: SG Wiener Neustadt
- Coach: Erich Neulinger

Florian Janistyn (born 22 April 1988) is an Austrian swimmer, who specializes in long-distance freestyle events. He is a two-time Austrian national record holder in both 800 and 1500 m freestyle, and also, a current member of SG Wiener Neustadt, under his personal coach Erich Neulinger.

Janistyn made his first Austrian team at the 2008 Summer Olympics in Beijing, swimming in both long-distance freestyle and freestyle relay team events. He swam on the second leg of the men's 4 × 200 m freestyle relay, posting a split time of 1:50.48. Janistyn and his teammates Dominik Koll, Markus Rogan, and David Brandl finished heat two in fifth place and ninth overall, with a total time of 7:11.45. Three days later, Janistyn won the first heat of his only individual event, the 1500 m freestyle, by sixteen seconds ahead of Bulgarian swimmer and three-time Olympian Petar Stoychev, with a new Austrian record time of 15:12.46. Janistyn, however, failed to advance into the final, as he placed twenty-first out of 37 swimmers in the evening's preliminaries.

Four years after competing in his first Olympics, Janistyn only qualified for the men's 4 × 200 m freestyle relay at the 2012 Summer Olympics in London. Swimming the anchor leg, Janistyn recorded a split time of 1:51.37, and the Austrian team (composed of Rogan, Brandl, and Christian Scherübl) went on to finish in eighth place and sixteenth overall, for a total time of 7:17.94.
