= Yannick Agnel =

French swimmer (born 1992)

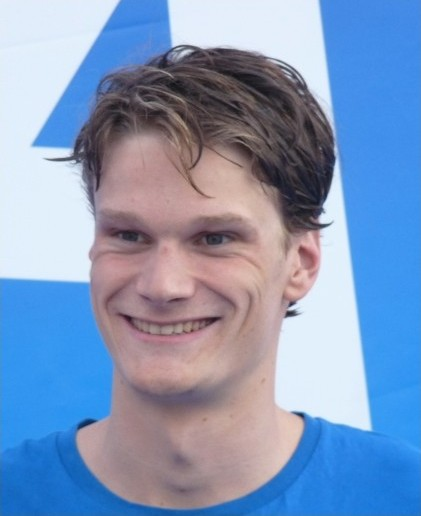
- Agnel in 2012

Personal information
- Nickname: The Squale
- Nationality: France
- Born: 9 June 1992 (age 34) Nîmes, France
- Height: 2.02 m (6 ft 8 in)
- Weight: 90 kg (198 lb)

Sport
- Sport: Swimming
- Strokes: Freestyle
- Club: North Baltimore Aquatic Club; L'Olympic Nice Natation; Mulhouse Olympic Natation
- Coach: Fabrice Pellerin; Bob Bowman (2013–2014); Lionel Horter (2014–2016)
Medal record
Event	1st	2nd	3rd
Olympic Games	2	1	0
World Championships (LC)	2	1	0
World Championships (SC)	1	0	1
European Championships (LC)	1	1	2
European Championships (SC)	2	0	1
European Junior Championships (LC)	8	1	0
Total	16	4	4
Representing France
Olympic Games
Gold medal – first place	2012 London	200 m freestyle
Gold medal – first place	2012 London	4×100 m freestyle
Silver medal – second place	2012 London	4×200 m freestyle
World Championships (LC)
Gold medal – first place	2013 Barcelona	200 m freestyle
Gold medal – first place	2013 Barcelona	4×100 m freestyle
Silver medal – second place	2011 Shanghai	4×200 m freestyle
World Championships (SC)
Gold medal – first place	2010 Dubai	4×100 m freestyle
Bronze medal – third place	2010 Dubai	4×200 m freestyle
European Championships (LC)
Gold medal – first place	2010 Budapest	400 m freestyle
Silver medal – second place	2010 Budapest	4×100 m freestyle
Bronze medal – third place	2010 Budapest	4×200 m freestyle
Bronze medal – third place	2014 Berlin	200 m freestyle
European Championships (SC)
Gold medal – first place	2012 Chartres	200 m freestyle
Gold medal – first place	2012 Chartres	400 m freestyle
Bronze medal – third place	2012 Chartres	100 m freestyle
European Junior Championships (LC)
Gold medal – first place	2009 Prague	200 m freestyle
Gold medal – first place	2009 Prague	400 m freestyle
Gold medal – first place	2009 Prague	4×200 m freestyle
Gold medal – first place	2010 Helsinki	100 m freestyle
Gold medal – first place	2010 Helsinki	200 m freestyle
Gold medal – first place	2010 Helsinki	400 m freestyle
Gold medal – first place	2010 Helsinki	4×100 m freestyle
Gold medal – first place	2010 Helsinki	4×200 m freestyle
Silver medal – second place	2010 Helsinki	4×100 m medley

Yannick Agnel (born 9 June 1992) is a French former competitive swimmer who specialized in freestyle events, and is a three-time Olympic medalist. In his Olympic debut at the 2012 Summer Olympics in London, he won gold in the 200-meter freestyle, gold in the 4×100-meter freestyle relay, and silver in the 4×200-meter freestyle relay. He is the current world record holder in the 400-meter freestyle (short course) and the national record holder in the 200- and 400-meter freestyle (long course).

Agnel's success earned him Swimming World's European Swimmer of the Year award in 2012.

== Early life ==
Agnel was born in Nîmes in 1992, the son of a nurse and a director of human resources. He was named after French tennis player Yannick Noah. Agnel began swimming at the age of eight after a neighbor spotted his talent and urged his parents to enroll him in a swimming club. He later integrated Skema Business School to study business. He is now in the prestigious French Grande École Paris-Dauphine IX.

== Swimming career ==
=== Early career ===
At the 2009 European Junior Swimming Championships, Agnel won the 200- and 400-meter freestyle in European junior record times. He was also a member of the 4×200-meter freestyle relay that won gold ahead of Russia and Italy.

In April 2010, Agnel set the French record in the 200-meter freestyle with a time of 1:46.35 to beat Amaury Leveaux's record of 1:46.54. In June 2010, he improved his record in the 200-meter freestyle with a time of 1:46.30.

At the 2010 European Junior Swimming Championships, Agnel set the French record in the 400-meter freestyle with a time of 3:46.26 to beat Nicolas Rostoucher's record of 3:46.28 en route to winning gold.

=== 2010 European Championships ===
At the 2010 European Aquatics Championships, Agnel won gold in the 400-meter freestyle setting a new French and championships record. Agnel then combined with Fabien Gilot, William Meynard, and Alain Bernard in the 4×100-meter freestyle relay to finish second behind Russia. As the second leg, Agnel had a 48.23 split. As the leadoff leg in the 4×200 m freestyle relay, Agnel broke his own French record in the 200-meter freestyle with a time of 1:45.83. Agnel, with Clement Lefert, Antton Haramboure, and Jérémy Stravius finished in third place in the 4×200-meter freestyle relay behind Russia and Germany.

=== 2011 World Championships ===
At the 2011 World Aquatics Championships in Shanghai, Agnel competed in three events. In his first event, the 400-meter freestyle, Agnel finished in 6th place with a time of 3:45.24. In his second event, the 200-meter freestyle, Agnel finished in fifth place with a time of 1:44.99, a new French record. Agnel won his only medal of the competition, a silver, in the 4×200-meter freestyle relay. Teaming with Grégory Mallet, Jérémy Stravius, and Fabien Gilot, their team had a final time of 7:04.81, a new French record. The United States finished 1st with a time of 7:02.67.

=== 2012 ===
==== 2012 Summer Olympics ====
Medal record

2012 London – Men's swimming

Representing France

Olympic Games
Gold medal – first place	200 m freestyle	1:43.14 (NR)
Gold medal – first place	4×100 m freestyle	3:09.93
Silver medal – second place	4×200 m freestyle	7:02.77

At the 2012 Summer Olympics in London, Agnel won a total of three medals: two golds and one silver. In his first event, Agnel anchored a come-from-behind effort in the 4×100-meter freestyle relay to win gold with Amaury Leveaux, Fabien Gilot, and Clément Lefert. Diving in with a 0.55 s deficit, Agnel was able to cut that down to a 0.30 s deficit at the 350-meter mark. In the last 50-meters, Agnel pulled ahead of American Ryan Lochte and France won with a time of 3:09:93 to the United States' time of 3:10:38. Agnel swam the fastest split time of the entire field with a time of 46.74, the only individual to break 47 seconds. The next day, Agnel won his second gold medal in the 200-meter freestyle with a time of 1:43.14, the fastest in French swimming history and 1.79 seconds ahead of silver medal winners Sun Yang and Park Tae-hwan. In the final, Agnel led from start-to-finish, recording a time of 50.64 in the first 100-meters and 52.50 in the last 100-meters. His time of 25.98 for the last 50-meters was by far the fastest in the field. Agnel won his final medal, a silver, in the 4×200-meter freestyle relay behind the United States with Amaury Leveaux, Grégory Mallet, and Clément Lefert. He had the fastest split time of the field in the final with a time of 1:43.24 as the anchor leg. In his final event, the 100-meter freestyle, Agnel finished fourth in a personal best time of 47.84, 0.04 s of a second outside the medals. The European Swimming Federation named Agnel male European swimmer of the year 2012.

==== Post-Olympics ====
On 15 November 2012, Agnel broke his first world record in the 400-meter freestyle with a time of 3:32.25 during the first day of the French short course nationals in Angers. In doing so, he bettered the previous record held by German swimmer Paul Biedermann (3.32.77) established in 2009 with a full bodysuit. A day later, he set the European record in the 800-meter freestyle and on 18 November, Agnel just missed Biedermann's world record in the 200-meter freestyle (short course).

At the 2012 European Short Course Swimming Championships in Chartres held a week after the French nationals, Agnel won a total of three medals: two gold and one bronze.

At year's end, Agnel was named the European Swimmer of the Year by Swimming World Magazine. In 2013, Agnel was made a Knight (Chevalier) of the Légion d'honneur.

=== 2013 World Championships ===
At the 2013 FINA World Championships in Barcelona, Agnel competed only in three events. On the first day of the tournament, Agnel helped his French team capture the nation's first ever world title over the Americans and the Russians in the 4 × 100 m freestyle relay. Teaming with Florent Manaudou, Fabien Gilot, and Jérémy Stravius in the final, Agnel recorded a lead-off split of 48.76 to deliver the French foursome a sterling time in 3:11.18. Two days later, Agnel added his second gold medal in the 200 m freestyle with a time of 1:44.20, finishing ahead of silver medalist and his training partner Conor Dwyer by 1.07 seconds. In his final event, 4 × 200 m freestyle relay, Agnel, along with Stravius, Grégory Mallet, and Lorys Bourelly, missed the podium by 17-hundredths of a second behind the Chinese team with a fourth-place effort in 7:04.91.

=== 2014 ===
After swimming in Nice, Agnel moved to the US to swim for the North Baltimore Aquatic Club, under coach Bob Bowman. The move proved to be un-successful as at the 2014 European Championship, Agnel was out of form and could only secure a bronze medal in the 200m freestyle. After the event, he decided to come back to France and now trains in Mulhouse.

=== 2015 ===
After securing a spot in the French national team, Agnel decided not to compete at the world championship in Kazan due to illness.

=== 2016 ===
Agnel finished in third position in the 200m freestyle event at the French national championships held on 30 March in Montpellier. Jérémy Stravius won the race while Jordan Pothain was second. In a controversial finish, it appeared that Agnel had finished second but failed to make clean contact with the timing pad at the end of the race. Only the top two finishers would qualify for the 2016 Summer Olympics. However, Agnel's path to defending his Olympic 200m freestyle title has been cleared by Pothain's decision to swim the 400m freestyle and not the 200m freestyle. At the Rio Olympics, Agnel failed to go past the heats of the 200m freestyle. He announced his retirement from competitive swimming soon after.

== Personal bests ==
As of 23 November 2012

Long course
Event	Time	Meet	Date	City	Note(s)
100 m freestyle	47.84	2012 Summer Olympics	1 August 2012	London, UK	
200 m freestyle	1:43.14	2012 Summer Olympics	30 July 2012	London, UK	NR
400 m freestyle	3:43.85	2011 French Nationals	23 March 2011	Schiltigheim, FRA	NR

Short course
Event	Time	Meet	Date	City	Note(s)
100 m freestyle	46.80	European Championships	24 November 2012	Chartres, FRA	
200 m freestyle	1:39.70	2012 French Nationals	18 November 2012	Angers, FRA	NR
400 m freestyle	3:32.25	2012 French Nationals	15 November 2012	Angers, FRA	WR
800 m freestyle	7.29.17	2012 French Nationals	16 November 2012	Angers, FRA	ER

== Controversy ==
In December 2021, Agnel was arrested following allegations of sexual assault involving a minor, stemming from incidents that reportedly occurred in 2016. The complaint was filed by the 13-year-old daughter of his former coach Lionel Horter. Agnel acknowledged having a relationship with the girl but denied any coercion. In January 2026, an appeals court in Colmar upheld the indictment, ruling that there was sufficient evidence to send Agnel to trial before the criminal court of the Haut-Rhin. He retained the right to appeal to France's Court of Cassation within 10 days of the ruling.

== See also ==
- World record progression 400 metres freestyle

Records
Preceded by Paul Biedermann	Men's 400 metre freestyle world record holder (short course); 15 November 2012 – present	Succeeded by Incumbent
Awards
Preceded by Alexander Dale Oen	European Swimmer of the Year; 2012	Succeeded by Dániel Gyurta
