= Michael Klueh =

American swimmer (born 1987)

Personal information
- Full name: Dr. Michael Patrick Klueh
- National team: United States
- Born: March 15, 1987 (age 39) Evansville, Indiana, U.S.
- Education: University of Texas ('10 Kinesiology); University of Michigan (2020 M.D.)
- Occupation: Orthopaedic Surgeon
- Height: 6 ft 3 in (1.91 m)
- Weight: 179 lb (81 kg)
- Spouse: Emily Brunemann (2014)

Sport
- Sport: Swimming
- Strokes: Freestyle
- Club: Newburg Sea Creatures, Evansville; Longhorn Aquatics, UT Austin; Club Wolverine, U. Michigan
- College team: University of Texas
- Coach: Eddie Reese (U. Texas)
Medal record
Men's swimming
Representing the United States
World Championships (LC)
Gold medal – first place	2013 Barcelona	4×200 m freestyle
Silver medal – second place	2015 Kazan	4×200 m freestyle
World Championships (SC)
Gold medal – first place	2012 Istanbul	4×200 m freestyle
Gold medal – first place	2014 Doha	4×200 m freestyle
Pan American Games
Silver medal – second place	2015 Toronto	4×200 m freestyle
Bronze medal – third place	2015 Toronto	4×100 m freestyle
Summer Universiade
Gold medal – first place	2007 Bangkok	4×100 m freestyle
Gold medal – first place	2007 Bangkok	4×200 m freestyle
Gold medal – first place	2011 Shenzhen	800 m freestyle
Gold medal – first place	2011 Shenzhen	4×200 m freestyle
Silver medal – second place	2007 Bangkok	400 m freestyle
Silver medal – second place	2011 Shenzhen	400 m freestyle
Bronze medal – third place	2005 Izmir	4×200 m freestyle
Bronze medal – third place	2007 Bangkok	1500 m freestyle

Dr. Michael Patrick Klueh (born March 15, 1987) is an American competition swimmer, who competed for the University of Texas. He was a four-time medalist (three gold, one silver) at the World Championships, and was an eight-time medalist (four gold, two silver, two bronze) at the World University Games between 2005-2011. He is a former American record holder in the short course 800 meter freestyle. After graduating Medical School at the University of Michigan in 2020, he has worked as an Orthopaedic Surgeon in Michigan specializing in sports injuries.

== Early life ==
Michael Patrick Kleueh was born March 15, 1987 in Evansville, Indiana, one of three siblings to mother Martha and father Michael. His mother Martha would later be a strong supporter of his early morning practices. He grew up in greater Evansville through at least age 15, where he attended Memorial High School, a Catholic school on Evanston's East side. Just west of Evansville, he trained and competed with the Newburgh Sea Creatures, in Newburgh, Indiana, from the age of ten, swimming for Coach Donny Brush from 2000-2002. From an athletic family, his sister Elizabeth swam for Indiana's Butler University. Competing at distance events from an early age, he swam a 15:30.6 for the 1,650 yard swim at the Senior State Championships for the 13-14 age group which was the second best National age group time.

After a move to Texas by his High School Junior or Senior year, he attended Bowie High School in Austin, and was a Texas 5A state high school record-holder in the 500-yard freestyle. He graduated Bowie High School in the Spring of 2005, and was announced as a National Interscholastic Swimming Coaches Association (NISCA) All American during his late High School career. At 17, Klueh won the 400-meter freestyle with a time of 3:54.75 at the Phillips National Swimming Championships in Stanford, California. By 17, he swam for Longhorn Aquatics associated with the University of Texas, and would continue to swim with Longhorn Aquatics during summer breaks from training with the University of Texas team, and when living in the greater Austin area.

== University of Texas ==
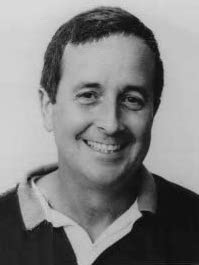
Coach Reese, '88

Klueh competed for the University of Texas swim team from 2005 to 2009 under Hall of Fame Head Coach Eddie Reese whose 46-year coaching tenure ran from 1979-2004. Klueh was a 2009 NCAA champion as a member of the University of Texas 4x200 yard freestyle relay. He majored in Kinesiology at Texas, graduating around 2010. During his accomplished collegiate swimming career, he was an All American nine times, and was an All American honorable mention recipient a total of three times. He won ten events at the Big 12 Conference Championships. At the NCAA Championships in his Junior year at UT for the 2007-8 season, he placed second in the 500 freestyle with a time of 4:10.00, breaking a school record in the event. In the 1,650 freestyle, he placed third in the event, again breaking the UT school record with a time of 14:36.07.

Kleuh held University of Texas school distance freestyle records in the 1000 freestyle with a time of 8:46.88, and the 1,650 freestyle with a time of 14:36.07. In middle distance, he held UT records in the 400 IM with a 3:45.31, and the 500 freestyle with a time of 4:10.00.

== 2008 Olympic trials ==
At the Olympic trials in 2008, Klueh, in the 400m freestyle Kleuh had a fifth place finish finals with a time of 3:50.44, and qualified for the finals in the preliminary round at 3:51.36 placing seventh overall. A fifth place finish in the final rounds, however, did not qualify him for the 2008 U.S. team in the event. In the 200 meter freestyle, he finished eleventh overall with a 1:47.74. In the 1500 meter freestyle, he finished seventeenth, with a 15:35.03, again not qualifying him for the U.S. Olympic team.

== International highlights ==
As shown in detail in the Medal record pull-down at right, Klueh was exceptionally accomplished in international competition in freestyle and freestyle relay events. Between 2007-2015, he won seven gold medals, four silver medals, and three bronze medals competing in 4x100 and 4x200 freestyle relay events, and the 400, 800, and 1500 meter individual freestyle events. He won his medals at the Long Course and Short Course World Championships from 2012-2015, at the 2015 Pan American Games, and at the Summer Universiade competition.

== Honors ==
During his High School Career at Bowie High, he was voted a 2004 Swimmer of the Year for Texas 5A. As a medical student at the University of Michigan, he was a recipient of an academic achievement award for the top academic standing in his medical class at graduation in 2010.

== Marriage ==
He was married to fellow swimmer Emily Brunemann in the Fall of 2014. A Notre Dame Academy graduate in 2005, and a 2010 University of Michigan graduate in 2010, she was an accomplished pool and open water distance swimmer. She competed in 10k and 25 K races and was a member of the U.S. National Open Water Swimming Team. Like husband Michael, she attended graduate school at the University of Michigan.

== Careers ==
Klueh graduated the University of Michigan Medical School in 2020. He was an orthopaedic surgery resident at the University of Michigan Medical School in 2021, completing his residency by 2025. After completing his residency, Dr. Klueh received Sports Medicine training in Shoulder and Elbow surgery at Charlotte, North Carolina's OrthoCarolina. Working during a fellowship, he was a Sports Medicine physician for the NFL's Carolina Panthers, Major League Soccer's Charlotte Football Club, and Triple-A baseball's minor league team, the Charlotte Knights.

He has specialized in a variety of sports injuries, that included ACl and tears of the miniscus, knee injuries, osteochondritis for the elbow and knee, throwing injuries and injuries of the shoulder and rotator cuff. He performs arthroscopic surgery particularly of the shoulder and knee, and has also served at the University of Michigan as a Professor in Clinical Orthopedic Surgery.

During his medical training, he swam with the Wolverine swim Club at Michigan University, and has been active in United States Masters Swimming. Staying active in the swimming community as an avocation, he has served on the Board of Directors for USA Swimming and on the Athletes Executive Committee of USA Swimming.
