= Dominik Kozma =

Hungarian swimmer (born 1991)

Personal information
- Nationality: Hungarian
- Born: 10 April 1991 (age 35) Dunfermline, Scotland
- Height: 1.92 m (6 ft 4 in)
- Weight: 75 kg (165 lb)

Sport
- Sport: Swimming
- Strokes: freestyle
- Club: Kőbánya SC (–2014); MTK Budapest (2015–17); BVSC-Zugló (2017–20); Stamina (2020–)
- Coach: György Túri (–2014); Ramon Kozma (2014–17); Péter Nagy (2017–20); László Kovács (2020–)
Medal record
World Championships
Bronze medal – third place	2017 Budapest	4x100 m freestyle
European Championships (LC)
Bronze medal – third place	2012 Debrecen	200 m freestyle
Bronze medal – third place	2012 Debrecen	4x200 m freestyle
Bronze medal – third place	2012 Debrecen	4x100 m medley
Bronze medal – third place	2014 Berlin	4x100 m medley
European Championships (SC)
Bronze medal – third place	2013 Herning	200 m freestyle
European Junior Championships
Gold medal – first place	2009 Prague	50 m freestyle
Silver medal – second place	2009 Prague	200 m medley
Bronze medal – third place	2009 Prague	4×100 m medley

Dominik Kozma (born 10 April 1991) is a Hungarian swimmer. He is the son of István Kozma, a professional footballer, who played for Dunfermline Athletic from 1989 to 1992.

== Career ==
=== 2008 Olympics ===
Kozma made his Olympic debut in 2008, competing as part of the Hungarian men's 4 × 200 m freestyle team.

=== 2012 Olympics ===
At the 2012 Summer Olympics, he competed in the same event, and the 4 × 100 m medley relay as well as the individual 200 m freestyle.

=== 2016 Olympics ===
He competed in those three events, as well at the 100 m freestyle at the 2016 Olympics.

=== International Swimming League ===
In 2019 Kozma was member of the 2019 International Swimming League representing Team Iron.
