= Riccardo Maestri =

Italian swimmer (born 1994)

Personal information
- Born: April 20, 1994 (age 32) Milan, Italy

Sport
- Sport: Swimming
Medal record
Representing Italy
European Championships
Silver medal – second place	2012 Debrecen	4x200m freestyle relay

Riccardo Maestri (born 20 April 1994) is an Italian swimmer. He competed in the 4 × 200 metre freestyle relay event at the 2012 Summer Olympics.
