= Danila Izotov =

Russian swimmer

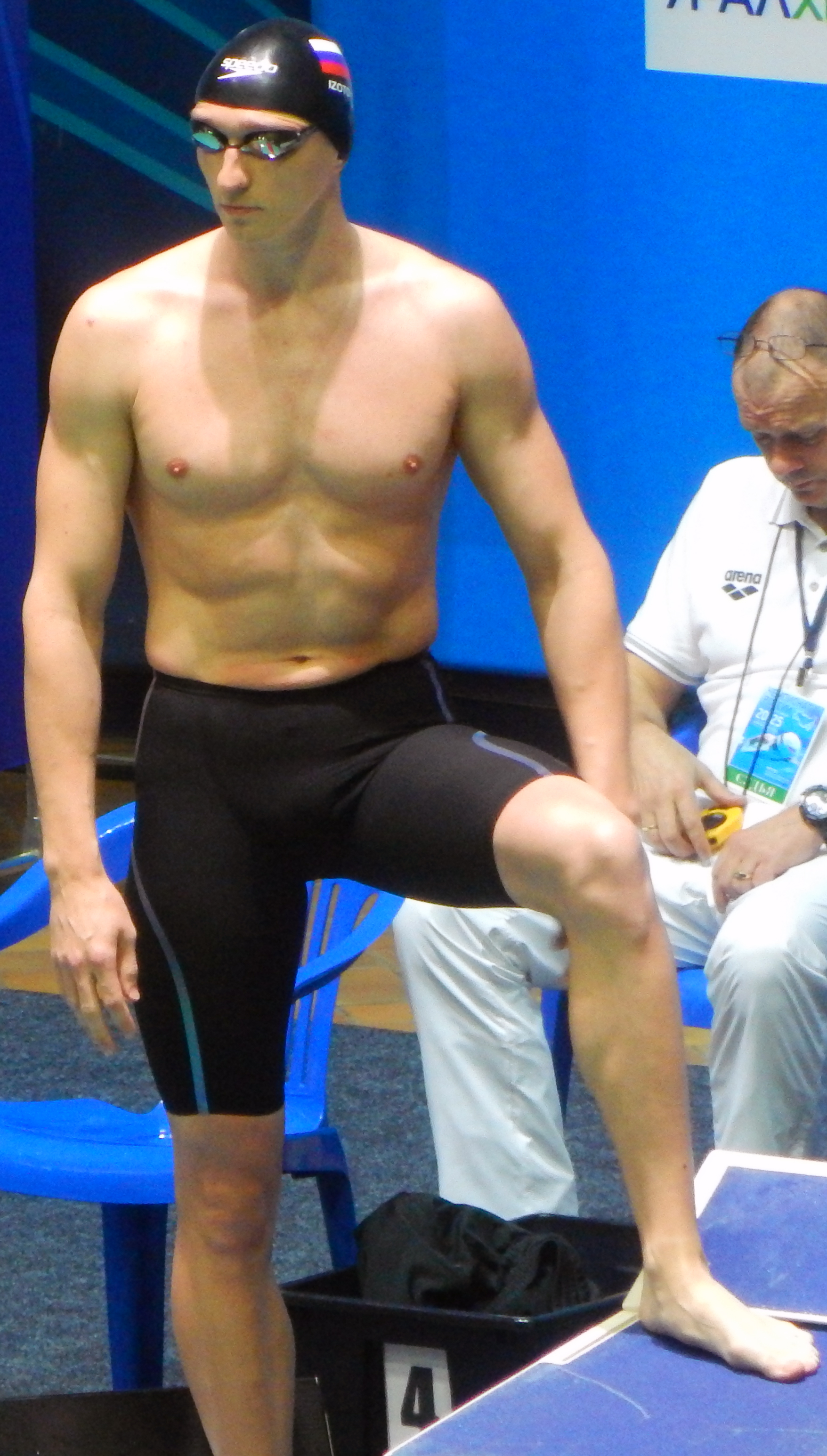
- 2018 Russian National Championships

Personal information
- Full name: Danila Sergeyevich Izotov
- Nickname: Dan
- Nationality: Russian
- Born: 2 October 1991 (age 34) Novouralsk, Russian SFSR, Soviet Union
- Height: 1.92 m (6 ft 4 in)
- Weight: 90 kg (198 lb)

Sport
- Sport: Swimming
- Strokes: freestyle
- Club: Dinamo
- Coach: Lidia Kapkova; Sergey Izotov; Yury Raykhman
Medal record
Representing Russia
Olympic Games
Silver medal – second place	2008 Beijing	4×200 m freestyle
Bronze medal – third place	2012 London	4×100 m freestyle
World Championships (LC)
Silver medal – second place	2009 Rome	4×100 m freestyle
Silver medal – second place	2009 Rome	4×200 m freestyle
Silver medal – second place	2013 Barcelona	4×200 m freestyle
Silver medal – second place	2015 Kazan	4×100 m freestyle
Silver medal – second place	2017 Budapest	4x200 m freestyle
Bronze medal – third place	2009 Rome	200 m freestyle
Bronze medal – third place	2013 Barcelona	200 m freestyle
Bronze medal – third place	2013 Barcelona	4×100 m freestyle
Bronze medal – third place	2017 Budapest	4×100 m medley
World Championships (SC)
Gold medal – first place	2010 Dubai	4×200 m freestyle
Silver medal – second place	2010 Dubai	200 m freestyle
Silver medal – second place	2010 Dubai	4×100 m freestyle
Silver medal – second place	2014 Doha	200 m freestyle
Silver medal – second place	2014 Doha	4×100 m freestyle
Bronze medal – third place	2014 Doha	100 m freestyle
Disqualified	2014 Doha	4×200 m freestyle
European Championships (LC)
Gold medal – first place	2010 Budapest	4×100 m freestyle
Gold medal – first place	2010 Budapest	4×200 m freestyle
Gold medal – first place	2018 Glasgow	4×100 m freestyle
Silver medal – second place	2018 Glasgow	4×200 m freestyle
Bronze medal – third place	2018 Glasgow	4×100 m mixed freestyle
European Championships (SC)
Gold medal – first place	2008 Rijeka	200 m freestyle
Gold medal – first place	2010 Eindhoven	100 m freestyle
Gold medal – first place	2010 Eindhoven	200 m freestyle
Gold medal – first place	2013 Herning	200 m freestyle
Silver medal – second place	2009 Istanbul	100 m freestyle
Silver medal – second place	2009 Istanbul	200 m freestyle
Silver medal – second place	2013 Herning	100 m freestyle
Bronze medal – third place	2010 Eindhoven	4×50 m freestyle
Bronze medal – third place	2010 Eindhoven	4×50 m medley
Summer Universiade
Gold medal – first place	2013 Kazan	200 m freestyle
Gold medal – first place	2013 Kazan	4×100 m freestyle
Gold medal – first place	2013 Kazan	4×200 m freestyle

Danila Sergeevich Izotov (Russian: Данила Сергеевич Изотов; born 2 October 1991) is a Russian swimmer, a member of the Russian National team since 2008, and a multiple medalist at the Olympic Games and World Championships, as well as a European champion. He is coached by his father, Sergey Alexandrovich Izotov. He is the nephew of soviet swimmer Elvira Vasilkova.

== Career ==
Izotov made his debut in the Russian national team at the 2007 European Youth Olympic Festival in Belgrade, Serbia, where he won four gold medals – 100 m, 200 m, 400 m freestyle and 4×100 mixed relay.

Izotov won a silver medal at the 2008 Olympic Games in Beijing in the 4 × 200 m freestyle relay together with Alexander Sukhorukov, Yevgeny Lagunov and Nikita Lobintsev. That year, he also won the men's 200 m freestyle at the European Short Course Championships.

In 2009, he set a world record in the 4 × 100 m medley in short swimming pools of 3:19.16 in St. Petersburg. At the 2009 World Championships in Rome, he was the only Russian individual medalist – a bronze in the 200 m freestyle. Besides, he swam the third laps in the finals of 4×100 and 4 × 200 m relay races; the Russians won the silver medal in both events, setting national records and an area record in the case of the 4 × 200 m relay. That year, he also set the Russian record in the short course 200 m freestyle while winning a silver at the European Short Course Championships, alongside another silver in the 100 m.

In 2010, he was part of the Russian team that set the world record in the short course men's 4 × 200 m freestyle, while winning the World title, along with (Lobinstsev, Lagunov and Sukhorukov). At the World Championships, he also won a silver in the 4 × 100 m freestyle and an individual silver medal in the 200 m freestyle. At the European Championship, the Russian teams won gold in the 4 × 100 m and 4 × 200 m freestyle relays. That year, he was also part of the 4 x 50 metre freestyle team and the 4 x 50 metre medley relay that won European short course bronze, alongside individual gold medals in the 100 and 200 m freestyle.

At the 2012 London Olympics, Izotov along with teammates (Andrey Grechin, Nikita Lobintsev, Vladimir Morozov) won Russia the bronze medal in the men's 4 × 100 m freestyle.

At the 2013 World Championships, he again won an individual bronze in the 200 m freestyle, while helping Russia win silver in the men's 4 × 200 m freestyle relay and bronze in the 4 × 100 m freestyle relay. He also won gold in the 200 m freestyle at the European Short Course Championships, along with a silver in the 100 m.

In 2014, Izotov was part of the Russian 4 × 100 m freestyle team that won silver at the World Short Course Swimming Championships, along with individual silver in the men's 200 m freestyle and a bronze medal in the men's 100 m freestyle.

He won another team silver at the 2015 World Championship, in the men's 4 × 100 m freestyle relay. In 2017, there was another World Championship silver, this time in the 4 × 200 m freestyle relay, along with a bronze in the men's 4 × 100 m medley relay.

He competed in the 2016 Olympics, in the Russian teams that finished in 4th in the 4 × 100 m freestyle relay and 5th in the 4 × 200 m freestyle relay.

At the 2018 European Championships, he won one medal of each colour, gold in the men's 4 × 100 m freestyle relay, silver in the men's 4 × 200 m freestyle relay, and bronze in the mixed 4 × 100 m freestyle relay.

== Education ==
Izotov is a student of the Institute of Physical Culture, Ural State Pedagogical University (USPU) Yekaterinburg.

== Awards and titles ==
Honoured Master of Sports of Russian Federation.

The medal of order for the merits before the motherland of the 2nd degree – for the valuable contribution in the development of physical culture and sport, high sports achievements on the XXIX Olympic Games of 2008 in Beijing (2009).

== Notes ==
1. The decree of the President of Russian Federation from 2 August 2009 N885 " about state awarding of Russian Federation
