= David Karasek =

Swiss swimmer (born 1987)

Personal information
- Nicknames: Kari, Seckel
- Nationality: Switzerland
- Born: 6 October 1987 (age 38) Zurich, Switzerland
- Height: 1.90 m (6 ft 3 in)
- Weight: 85 kg (187 lb)

Sport
- Sport: Swimming
- Strokes: Freestyle, medley
- Club: Limmat Sharks (SUI)
- College team: Virginia Cavaliers (USA)
- Coach: Mark Bernardino; Dirk Reinicke

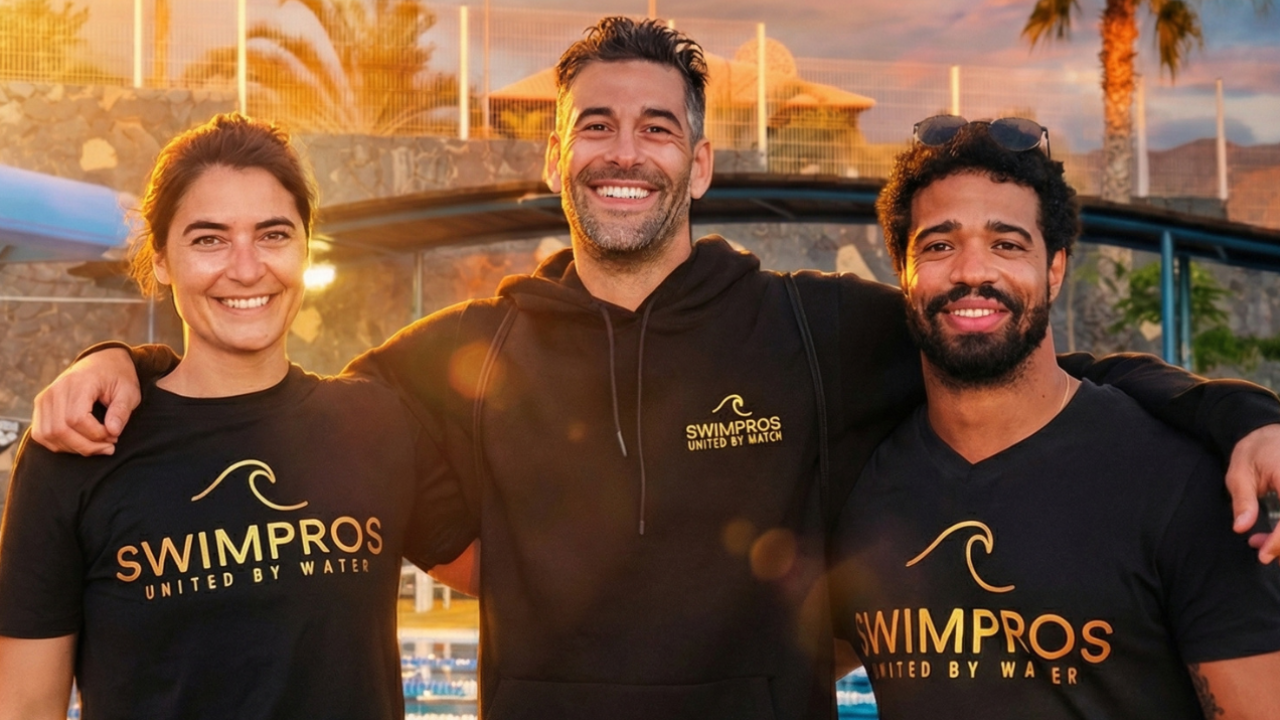
David Karasek, Swiss Olympic swimmer and founder of Swimpros, coaching at a performance swim camp

David Karasek (born 6 October 1987 in Zurich) is a Swiss swimmer, who specialized in freestyle and individual medley events. He is a 10-time Swiss swimming champion, a multiple-time medley record holder, and a former member of the swimming team for Virginia Cavaliers under his personal coaches Mark Bernardino and Dirk Reinicke.

Karasek qualified for the men's 200 m individual medley at the 2012 Summer Olympics in London, by breaking a Swiss record and eclipsing a FINA B-cut of 2:01.79 from the national championships in Zurich. He challenged seven other swimmers on the second heat, including Olympic veterans Bradley Ally of Barbados, Martin Liivamägi of Estonia, and Raphaël Stacchiotti of Luxembourg. He edged out Tunisia's Taki M'rabet to pick up a seventh spot by 0.06 of a second, lowering his own Swiss record to 2:01.35. Karasek failed to advance into the semifinals, as he placed twenty-eighth overall in the preliminaries. His personal bests include the 200 m freestyle (1:48.97) and the 400 m freestyle (3:52.64) in long course.

Karasek is a commerce graduate at the University of Virginia in Charlottesville, Virginia. In February 2013, Karasek said that he is working on a master's degree of finance at the IE Business School in Madrid, Spain. He said "Other than (school), I couldn’t live in Spain, as I don’t like it much, especially the swimming. It’s just not the same as the opportunities to swim at UVA for four years. That enthusiasm is missing in Spain. They’re a little lazy and it’s just not as fun".
