= Nikita Lobintsev =

Russian swimmer

Personal information
- Full name: Nikita Konstantinovich Lobintsev
- Nationality: Russia
- Born: 21 November 1988 (age 37) Sverdlovsk, USSR, Soviet Union
- Height: 192 cm (6 ft 4 in)
- Weight: 86 kg (190 lb)

Sport
- Sport: Swimming
- Strokes: Freestyle
Medal record
Olympic Games
Silver medal – second place	2008 Beijing	4×200 m freestyle
Bronze medal – third place	2012 London	4×100 m freestyle
World Championships (LC)
Silver medal – second place	2009 Rome	4×200 m freestyle
Silver medal – second place	2013 Barcelona	4×200 m freestyle
Silver medal – second place	2015 Kazan	4×100 m freestyle
Silver medal – second place	2017 Budapest	4×200 m freestyle
Bronze medal – third place	2013 Barcelona	4×100 m freestyle
World Championships (SC)
Gold medal – first place	2010 Dubai	4×200 m freestyle
Gold medal – first place	2016 Windsor	4x50 m freestyle
Gold medal – first place	2016 Windsor	4x100 m freestyle
Silver medal – second place	2010 Dubai	4×100 m freestyle
Silver medal – second place	2010 Dubai	400 m freestyle
Silver medal – second place	2010 Dubai	4×100 m medley
Bronze medal – third place	2010 Dubai	100 m freestyle
European Championships (LC)
Gold medal – first place	2010 Budapest	4×100 m freestyle
Gold medal – first place	2010 Budapest	4×200 m freestyle
Silver medal – second place	2008 Eindhoven	4×200 m freestyle
Silver medal – second place	2010 Budapest	200 m freestyle
Silver medal – second place	2014 Berlin	4x100 m freestyle
Silver medal – second place	2014 Berlin	4×200 m freestyle
Bronze medal – third place	2008 Eindhoven	400 m freestyle
European Championships (SC)
Gold medal – first place	2013 Herning	400 m freestyle
Gold medal – first place	2013 Herning	4×50 m mixed freestyle
Silver medal – second place	2009 Istanbul	400 m freestyle
Silver medal – second place	2013 Herning	200 m freestyle
Bronze medal – third place	2009 Istanbul	200 m freestyle
Summer Universiade
Gold medal – first place	2013 Kazan	4×100 m freestyle
Gold medal – first place	2013 Kazan	4×200 m freestyle
Silver medal – second place	2007 Bangkok	4×200 m freestyle
Silver medal – second place	2013 Kazan	100 m freestyle
Silver medal – second place	2013 Kazan	200 m freestyle

Nikita Konstantinovich Lobintsev (Russian: Никита Константинович Лобинцев; born 21 November 1988 in Yekaterinburg) is a Russian freestyle swimmer, who won the silver medal in the 4 × 200 m freestyle relay at the 2008 Summer Olympics. At that Olympics, he also competed in the 400 m freestyle, finishing in 8th, and the 1500 m freestyle, finishing in 31st.

He was part of the Russian team that won the bronze medal in the 4 x 100 m freestyle at the 2012 Summer Olympics, also competing in the individual 100 m freestyle.

At the 2016 Olympics, he competed in the men's 200 m freestyle.
