= Christian Scherübl =

Austrian swimmer

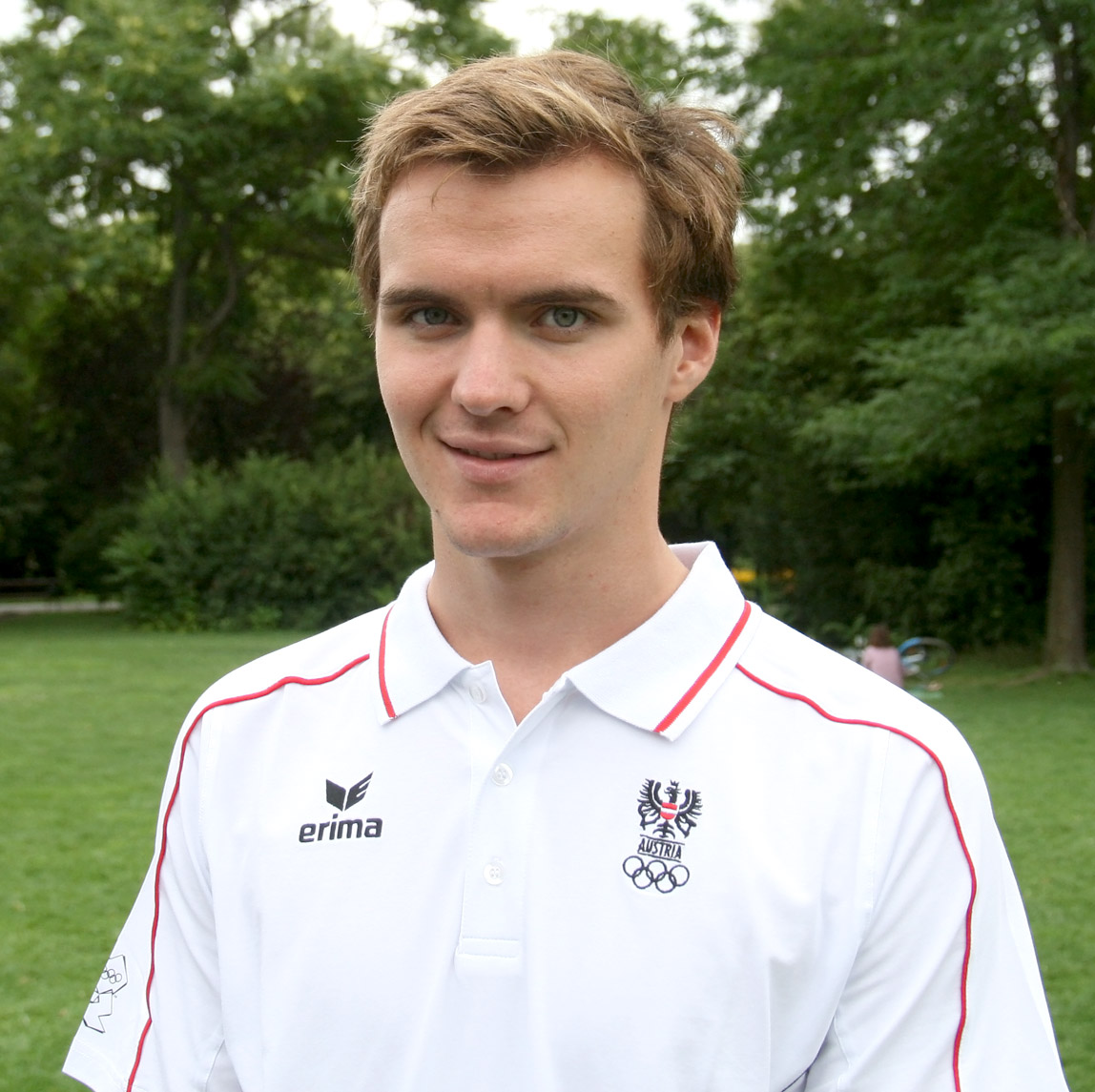

Personal information
- Nationality: Austria
- Born: 6 April 1994 (age 32) Graz, Austria
- Height: 1.83 m (6 ft 0 in)
- Weight: 76 kg (168 lb)

Sport
- Sport: Swimming
- Strokes: Freestyle
- Club: ATUS Graz
- Coach: Christoph Schreiner

Christian Scherübl (born April 6, 1994, in Graz) is an Austrian swimmer, who specialized in long-distance and relay freestyle events. Within a 16-year and younger age group, Scherubl set an Austrian record time of 4:05.20 in the boys' 400 m freestyle at the 2010 Geneva Long Course International Meet in Geneva, Switzerland. Scherubl is also a member of the swimming team for ATUS Graz, and is coached and trained by Christoph Schreiner.

Scherubl represented Austria at the 2012 Summer Olympics in London, where he qualified for the men's 4 × 200 m freestyle relay, along with his teammates Florian Janistyn, David Brandl, and double Olympic silver medalist Markus Rogan. Swimming the second leg, Scherubl recorded a split of 1:48.64, and the Austrian team went on to finish heat two in eighth place and sixteenth overall, for a total time of 7:17.94.
