= Dimitri Colupaev =

Moldovan-born German swimmer

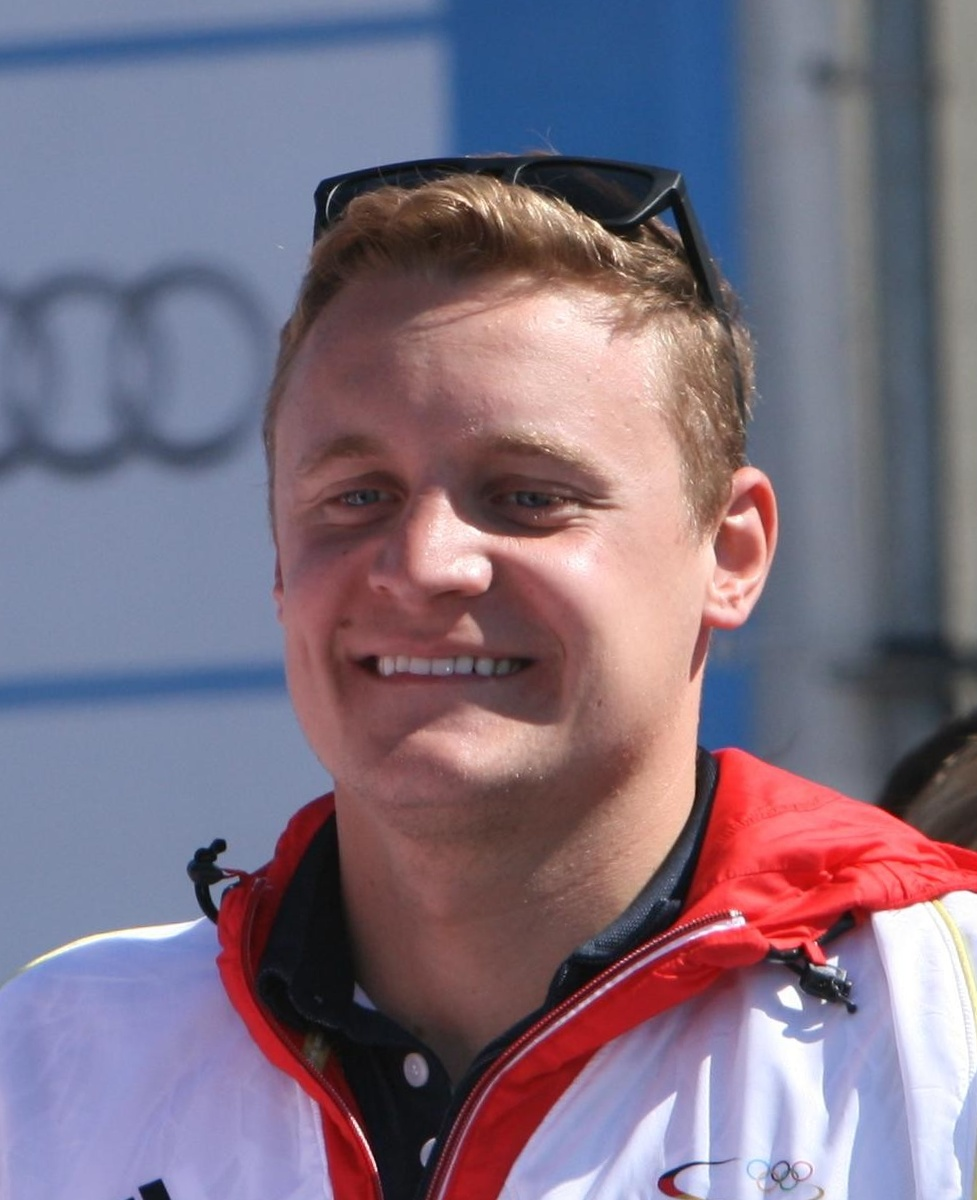
- Colupaev in 2012

Personal information
- National team: Germany
- Born: 29 January 1990 (age 36) Chișinău, Moldovan SSR, Soviet Union
- Height: 1.89 m (6 ft 2 in)
- Weight: 89 kg (196 lb)

Sport
- Sport: Swimming
- Club: SSV Udine Mainz
Medal record
Representing Germany
World Championships (SC)
Bronze medal – third place	2012 Istanbul	4×200 m freestyle
Youth World Championships
Gold medal – first place	2008 Monterrey	200 m medley

Dimitri Colupaev (born 29 January 1990) is a Moldovan-born German swimmer. He competed in the 4×200 metre freestyle relay event at the 2012 Summer Olympics and finished fourth. At the 2012 European Aquatics Championships, Colupaev and his German teammates won the gold in the 4×200 metre freestyle relay.

In 2010 he was studying at the University of Southern California in the United States.
