= Alex Di Giorgio =

Italian swimmer (born 1990)

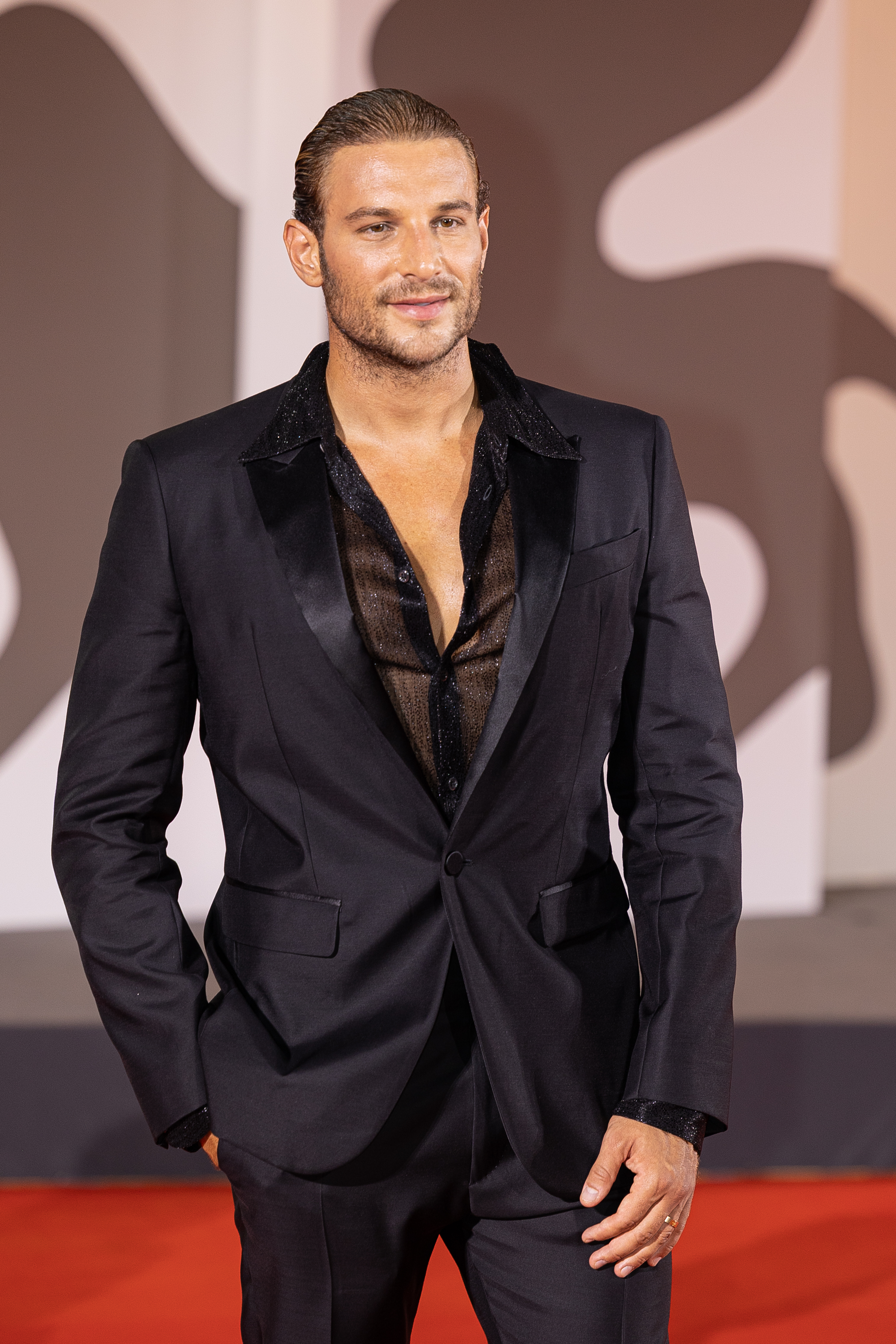
- Alex Di Giorgio at the Venice Film Festival 2024

Personal information
- National team: Italy
- Born: 28 July 1990 (age 35) Rome, Italy
- Height: 1.86 m (6 ft 1 in)
- Weight: 80 kg (176 lb)

Sport
- Sport: Swimming
- Strokes: Freestyle
- Club: C.C. Aniene
Medal record
Men's swimming
Representing Italy
European Championships (LC)
| Silver medal – second place | 2012 Debrecen | 4×200 m freestyle |
Mediterranean Games
| Gold medal – first place | 2013 Mersin | 4×100 m freestyle |
| Gold medal – first place | 2013 Mersin | 4×200 m freestyle |
| Gold medal – first place | 2013 Mersin | 4×100 m medley |
Summer Universiade
| Silver medal – second place | 2017 Taipei | 4×100 m freestyle |

Alex Di Giorgio (born 28 July 1990 in Rome) is an Italian swimmer. He competed in the 4 × 200 metre freestyle relay event at the 2012 and 2016 Summer Olympics. He is openly gay.
