= Tim Wallburger =

German swimmer

Personal information
- Born: 18 August 1989 (age 37) Dresden, East Germany
- Height: 1.91 m (6 ft 3 in)
- Weight: 95 kg (209 lb)

Sport
- Sport: Swimming
- Strokes: Freestyle; Butterfly
- Club: SG Neukolln
Medal record
European Championships (LC)
Gold medal – first place	2012 Debrecen	4×200 m freestyle
Silver medal – second place	2010 Budapest	4×200 m freestyle
European Championships (SC)
Silver medal – second place	2010 Eindhoven	200 m butterfly

Tim Wallburger (born 18 August 1989, Dresden) is a German swimmer. He competed at the 2012 Summer Olympics in the 4 × 200 m freestyle relay and finished in fourth place. He won a silver and a gold medal in this event at the European championships in 2010 and 2012, respectively.
