= Viacheslav Andrusenko =

Russian swimmer

Personal information
- Nationality: Russian
- Born: 14 May 1992 (age 34) Saint Petersburg, Russia

Sport
- Sport: Swimming
- Strokes: Freestyle
Medal record
World Championships (SC)
Disqualified	2014 Doha	4×200 m freestyle
European Championships (LC)
Silver medal – second place	2014 Berlin	4×200 m freestyle
Silver medal – second place	2018 Glasgow	4×200 m freestyle
Silver medal – second place	2018 Glasgow	4×200 m mixed freestyle
Bronze medal – third place	2012 Debrecen	4×100 m freestyle
European Championships (SC)
Gold medal – first place	2013 Herning	4×50 m freestyle
Bronze medal – third place	2015 Netanya	200 m freestyle
Summer Universiade
Bronze medal – third place	2017 Taipei	4×200 m freestyle

Viacheslav Dmitrievich Andrusenko (Russian: Вячеслав Дмитриевич Андрусенко; born 14 May 1992) is a Russian swimmer. He competed in the men's 4 × 200 metre freestyle relay event at the 2016 Summer Olympics.
