= Gianluca Maglia =

Italian swimmer (born 1988)

Personal information
- Nationality: Italy
- Born: 12 December 1988 (age 37) Catania, Italy
- Height: 194 cm (6 ft 4 in)
- Weight: 82 kg (181 lb)

Sport
- Sport: Swimming
- Strokes: Freestyle
- Club: G.S. Fiamme Oro and Ispra Swim Plane
- Coach: Giovanni Giunta
Medal record
European Championships (LC)
Silver medal – second place	2012 Debrecen	4x200 m freestyle
Mediterranean Games
Gold medal – first place	2009 Pescara	4x200 m freestyle
Gold medal – first place	2013 Mersin	4x100 m freestyle
Gold medal – first place	2013 Mersin	4x200 m freestyle
Gold medal – first place	2013 Mersin	4x100 m medley
Silver medal – second place	2009 Pescara	4x100 m freestyle

Gianluca Maglia (born 12 December 1988) is a male Italian swimmer.

Maglia is an athlete of the Gruppo Sportivo Fiamme Oro.

== Biography ==
In 2012, Maglia qualified for his first Olympic appearance in London 2012.

== Achievements ==
On 31 July, during the 2012 Summer Olympics in London, England he participated in the Men's 4 × 200 m Freestyle Relay Heat. The team finished 6th, in a time of 7:12.69.

== See also ==
- Italy at the 2012 Summer Olympics - Swimming
