= Robert Renwick =

Scottish swimmer

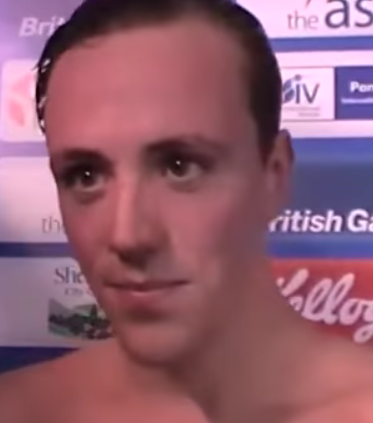
- Renwick at the 2011 British Gas ASA Championships

Personal information
- Full name: Robert Peter Renwick
- Nicknames: "Robbie", "Rabs"
- National team: Scotland; Great Britain
- Born: 21 July 1988 (age 37) Abu Dhabi, United Arab Emirates
- Height: 1.83 m (6 ft 0 in)
- Weight: 78 kg (172 lb; 12.3 st)

Sport
- Sport: Swimming
- Strokes: Freestyle
- Club: University of Stirling
- Coach: Steven Tigg
Medal record
Men's swimming
Representing Great Britain
Olympic Games
Silver medal – second place	2016 Rio de Janeiro	4×200 m freestyle
World Championships (LC)
Gold medal – first place	2015 Kazan	4×200 m freestyle
World Championships (SC)
Silver medal – second place	2008 Manchester	4×200 m freestyle
Bronze medal – third place	2008 Manchester	400 m freestyle
European Championships (LC)
Gold medal – first place	2016 London	4×100 m medley
Representing Scotland
Commonwealth Games
Gold medal – first place	2010 Delhi	200 m freestyle
Silver medal – second place	2006 Melbourne	4×200 m freestyle
Silver medal – second place	2010 Delhi	4×200 m freestyle
Silver medal – second place	2014 Glasgow	4×200 m freestyle

Robert Peter Renwick (born 21 July 1988) is a Scottish former competitive swimmer who represented Great Britain at the Olympics and FINA world championships, as well as Scotland in the Commonwealth Games. Renwick is a world champion and a Commonwealth Games gold medallist. He first rose to prominence by swimming the anchor leg in the Scottish men's 4×200-metre freestyle relay team at the 2006 Commonwealth Games as a 17-year-old. The team won silver, after he was narrowly touched out by the English relay team. Renwick featured in every major Olympic or world championship for Britain from 2007 to 2016.

== Career ==
Robert qualified for Team GB at the 2008 Beijing Olympics in two events, the 200-metre freestyle and the 4×200-metre freestyle relay. He achieved this by finishing second, behind Ross Davenport, in the 2008 Long Course British Championships (incorporating the Olympic trials). His time in the final was 1:48.29.

Renwick won the gold medal in the 200 m freestyle at the 2010 Commonwealth Games in Delhi, India. He touched out Kendrick Monk of Australia in a close race.

His greatest success came in the 2015 World Championships in Kazan, Russia where Renwick, along with Dan Wallace, Callum Jarvis and James Guy beat the United States in the men's 4×200 m freestyle. Renwick's 2nd leg split of 1:45.98 was the fastest of his career at the age of 27.

Renwick held the British record for the 200 m freestyle in a time of 1:45.99 for six years, and was a member of the 4×200 m freestyle relay team that holds the record at 7:04.43.

== Honours ==
Renwick was inducted into the Scottish Swimming Hall of Fame in 2018.

== See also ==
- List of Commonwealth Games medallists in swimming (men)
