= 2012 FINA World Swimming Championships (25 m) – Men's 100 metre butterfly =

Men's 100m Butterfly at the 2012 Short Course Worlds
- Dates: 12 December (heats and semifinals); 13 December (final)
- Winning time: 48.82

Medalists
gold medal	Chad le Clos	South Africa
silver medal	Tom Shields	United States
bronze medal	Ryan Lochte	United States

The men's 100 metre butterfly event at the 11th FINA World Swimming Championships (25m) took place 12 – 13 December 2012 at the Sinan Erdem Dome.

== Records ==
Prior to this competition, the existing world and championship records were as follows.

	Name	Nation	Time	Location	Date
World record	Yevgeny Korotyshkin	Russia	48.48	Berlin	15 November 2009
Championship record	Peter Mankoč	Slovenia	50.04	Manchester	10 April 2008

The following records were established during the competition:

Date	Event	Name	Nation	Time	Record
13 December	Final	Chad le Clos	South Africa	48.82	CR

== Results ==
=== Heats ===
Rank	Heat	Lane	Name	Time	Notes
1	9	1	Ryan Lochte (USA)	50.16	Q
2	1	2	Wu Peng (CHN)	50.49	Q, NR
3	10	4	Chad le Clos (RSA)	50.73	Q
4	9	3	Joeri Verlinden (NED)	50.81	Q
5	8	4	Tom Shields (USA)	50.82	Q
6	10	7	László Cseh (HUN)	50.86	Q, NR
7	10	6	Peter Mankoč (SLO)	50.99	Q
8	9	6	Kazuya Kaneda (JPN)	51.00	Q
9	10	5	Kenneth To (AUS)	51.06	Q
10	9	2	Jason Dunford (KEN)	51.14	Q
11	9	4	Konrad Czerniak (POL)	51.15	Q
12	8	8	Matteo Rivolta (ITA)	51.19	Q, NR
13	8	3	Nikolay Skvortsov (RUS)	51.29	Q
13	9	5	Rafael Muñoz (ESP)	51.29	Q
15	8	5	François Heersbrandt (BEL)	51.31	Q
16	10	2	Yauhen Tsurkin (BLR)	51.47	Q
17	2	8	Frédérick Bousquet (FRA)	51.50	
18	10	3	Kaio de Almeida (BRA)	51.57	
19	9	7	Bence Pulai (HUN)	51.61	
20	10	0	Chang Gyu-Cheol (KOR)	51.70	
21	8	7	Grant Irvine (AUS)	51.81	
22	6	3	Joseph Schooling (SIN)	51.84	NR
23	8	2	Viacheslav Prudnikov (RUS)	51.89	
24	7	0	Ben Hockin (PAR)	51.99	NR
25	10	9	Andreas Vazaios (GRE)	52.05	NR
26	8	6	Romain Sassot (FRA)	52.07	
27	9	0	Mauricio Fiol (PER)	52.08	NR
28	10	8	Michal Poprawa (POL)	52.24	
29	10	1	Robert Žbogar (SLO)	52.34	
30	2	0	Chen Yin (CHN)	52.36	
31	7	3	Coleman Allen (CAN)	52.60	
32	6	6	Victor Bromer (DEN)	52.98	
33	7	6	Dominik Straga (CRO)	53.14	
34	7	5	Alex Hernandez Medina (CUB)	53.15	
35	8	0	Joshua McLeod (TRI)	53.20	
36	7	1	Zackariah Chetrat (CAN)	53.23	
37	8	9	Kenta Hirai (JPN)	53.25	
38	9	9	Martin Verner (CZE)	53.32	
39	6	4	Yevgeniy Lazuka (AZE)	53.33	
40	7	4	Garth Tune (RSA)	53.44	
41	7	8	Nurettin Yildir Erhan (TUR)	53.51	
42	9	8	Alon Mandel (ISR)	53.65	
43	8	1	Hoang Quy Phuoc (VIE)	53.66	
44	6	7	Emmanuel Crescimbeni (PER)	53.69	
45	7	2	Joaquin Belza (ARG)	54.25	
46	7	7	Alexandre Liess (SUI)	54.26	
47	6	5	Ng Chun Nam Derick (HKG)	54.41	
48	6	8	Jose Lobo Martinez (PAR)	54.42	
49	6	2	Aleksey Derlyugov (UZB)	54.61	
50	6	0	Ng Kai Wee Rainer (SIN)	55.11	
51	5	8	Radhames Kalaf (DOM)	55.24	
52	6	1	Pavel Naroskin (EST)	55.29	
53	5	4	Teimuraz Kobakhidze (GEO)	55.53	
54	6	9	Orri Freyr Gudmundsson (ISL)	55.81	
55	5	6	Pavel Izbisciuc (MDA)	56.10	
56	5	7	Joaquin Sepulveda (CHI)	56.57	
57	7	9	Matthew Abeysinghe (SRI)	56.80	
58	5	1	Timothy Wynter (JAM)	56.92	
59	5	0	Sarma Nair (IND)	56.96	
60	5	9	Afshin Asgari (IRI)	57.00	
61	1	4	Anthonny Sitraka Ralefy (MAD)	57.41	
62	3	4	Ahmad Attellesey (LBA)	57.89	
63	4	5	Julian Harding (MLT)	57.90	
64	4	6	James Sanderson (GIB)	58.15	
65	4	7	Valdo Lourenço (MOZ)	58.24	
66	4	9	Dulguun Batsaikhan (MGL)	58.28	
67	1	3	Adrian Todd (BOT)	58.36	
68	3	5	Paul Elaisa (FIJ)	58.50	
68	5	2	Obaid Al-Jasmi (UAE)	58.50	
70	4	8	Fernando Medrano Medina (NCA)	58.55	
71	4	4	Mohammed Al-Ghafri (UAE)	58.69	
72	3	3	Ralph Goveia (ZAM)	58.90	
73	4	2	Nuno Rola (ANG)	58.99	
74	4	3	Omar Mithqal (JOR)	59.08	
75	1	6	David van der Colff (BOT)	59.12	
76	5	5	Rahul Monal Chokshi (IND)	59.43	
77	4	0	Sio Ka Kun (MAC)	59.69	
78	4	1	Ameer Adnan Ali (IRQ)	59.96	
79	3	2	Stanford Gore Kawale (PNG)	1:00.45	
80	3	6	Khalid Baba (BHR)	1:01.75	
81	3	7	Omar Omar (QAT)	1:01.85	
82	2	7	Borhane Ahmed Mohamed Abro (DJI)	1:02.12	
83	1	5	Aung Thiha (MYA)	1:02.24	
84	3	1	Michael Hitchcock (GIB)	1:02.70	
85	2	4	Joseph Seguina (GUY)	1:03.50	
86	2	5	Hannibal Gaskin (GUY)	1:03.60	
87	3	9	Franc Aleksi (ALB)	1:05.39	
88	2	9	Giordan Harris (MHL)	1:09.27	
89	2	6	Jamal Tamasese (SAM)	1:10.18	
90	2	3	Mohamed Muthasim Adnan (MDV)	1:12.69	
	2	2	Chavez Joseph (VIN)	DSQ	
	5	3	Ayman Klzie (SYR)	DSQ	
	2	1	Leonardo Alcover (BRA)	DNS	
	3	0	Julien Brice (LCA)	DNS	
	3	8	Alassane Sylla (CIV)	DNS	

=== Semifinals ===
Rank	Heat	Lane	Name	Nationality	Time	Notes
1	2	3	Tom Shields	United States	50.14	Q
2	2	5	Chad le Clos	South Africa	50.16	Q
3	1	5	Joeri Verlinden	Netherlands	50.43	Q
4	2	4	Ryan Lochte	United States	50.59	Q
5	1	3	László Cseh	Hungary	50.72	Q, NR
6	1	1	Rafael Muñoz	Spain	50.73	Q
6	2	7	Konrad Czerniak	Poland	50.73	Q
8	1	4	Wu Peng	China	50.77	?
8	2	1	Nikolay Skvortsov	Russia	50.77	?
10	2	8	François Heersbrandt	Belgium	50.90	
11	2	2	Kenneth To	Australia	50.93	
12	2	6	Peter Mankoč	Slovenia	51.00	
13	1	6	Kazuya Kaneda	Japan	51.04	
14	1	2	Jason Dunford	Kenya	51.08	
15	1	7	Matteo Rivolta	Italy	51.10	NR
16	1	8	Yauhen Tsurkin	Belarus	51.23	

==== Swim-off ====
Rank	Lane	Name	Nationality	Time	Notes
1	5	Nikolay Skvortsov	Russia	50.60	Q
2	4	Wu Peng	China	50.78	

=== Final ===
The final was held at 20:33.

Rank	Lane	Name	Nationality	Time	Notes
1st place, gold medalist(s)	5	Chad le Clos	South Africa	48.82	CR, AF
2nd place, silver medalist(s)	4	Tom Shields	United States	49.54	
3rd place, bronze medalist(s)	6	Ryan Lochte	United States	49.59	
4	3	Joeri Verlinden	Netherlands	50.45	
5	1	Konrad Czerniak	Poland	50.54	
6	7	Rafael Muñoz	Spain	50.76	
6	8	Nikolay Skvortsov	Russia	50.76	
8	2	László Cseh	Hungary	50.93	
