= 2012 FINA World Swimming Championships (25 m) – Men's 50 metre butterfly =

Men's 50m Butterfly at the 2012 Short Course Worlds
- Dates: 14 December (heats and semifinals); 15 December (final)
- Winning time: 22.22

Medalists
gold medal	Nicholas Santos	Brazil
silver medal	Chad le Clos	South Africa
bronze medal	Tom Shields	United States

The men's 50 metre butterfly event at the 11th FINA World Swimming Championships (25m) took place 14 – 15 December 2012 at the Sinan Erdem Dome.

== Records ==
Prior to this competition, the existing world and championship records were as follows.

	Name	Nation	Time	Location	Date
World record	Steffen Deibler	Germany	21.80	Berlin	14 November 2009
Championship record	Albert Subirats	Venezuela	22.40	Dubai	18 December 2010

The following records were established during the competition:

Date	Event	Name	Nation	Time	Record
14 December	Heats	Nicholas Santos	Brazil	22.40	=CR
14 December	Semifinals	Nicholas Santos	Brazil	22.23	CR
15 December	Final	Nicholas Santos	Brazil	22.22	CR

== Results ==
=== Heats ===
Rank	Heat	Lane	Name	Time	Notes
1	14	4	Nicholas Santos (BRA)	22.40	Q, =CR
2	14	3	Chad le Clos (RSA)	22.78	Q
3	12	5	Yauhen Tsurkin (BLR)	22.93	Q
4	1	3	Wu Peng (CHN)	22.96	Q
5	14	5	Andriy Hovorov (UKR)	22.98	Q
6	14	9	Peter Mankoč (SLO)	23.05	Q
7	13	5	Jason Dunford (KEN)	23.07	Q
7	13	6	Tom Shields (USA)	23.07	Q
9	12	3	Joeri Verlinden (NED)	23.11	Q
10	12	4	Frédérick Bousquet (FRA)	23.18	Q
11	13	3	Kaio de Almeida (BRA)	23.21	Q
12	14	6	François Heersbrandt (BEL)	23.22	Q, =NR
13	13	8	Ben Hockin (PAR)	23.27	Q, NR
14	14	8	Barry Murphy (IRL)	23.52	Q, NR
15	13	2	Romain Sassot (FRA)	23.53	Q
16	12	2	Evgeny Koptelov (RUS)	23.57	Q
17	14	0	Joseph Schooling (SIN)	23.58	NR
18	14	2	Iskender Baslakov (TUR)	23.61	
19	14	7	Joshua McLeod (TRI)	23.63	
20	13	1	Matteo Rivolta (ITA)	23.74	
21	11	6	Garth Tune (RSA)	23.77	
22	11	1	Daniel Ramirez Carranza (MEX)	23.82	
23	2	8	Mindaugas Sadauskas (LTU)	23.86	
23	11	8	Chang Gyu-Cheol (KOR)	23.86	
23	12	9	Viacheslav Prudnikov (RUS)	23.86	
26	14	1	Bence Pulai (HUN)	23.92	
27	10	1	Shinri Shioura (JPN)	23.93	
28	11	3	Cameron Simpson (NZL)	23.97	
28	12	0	Mihael Vukić (CRO)	23.97	
30	11	2	Alex Hernandez Medina (CUB)	23.98	
31	12	8	Grant Irvine (AUS)	24.01	
32	13	9	Yevgeniy Lazuka (AZE)	24.04	
33	11	9	Coleman Allen (CAN)	24.08	
34	10	5	Norbert Trandafir (ROU)	24.10	
35	2	4	Chen Yin (CHN)	24.12	
36	12	7	Alon Mandel (ISR)	24.21	
37	11	7	Krisztián Takács (HUN)	24.23	
38	11	5	Martin Verner (CZE)	24.29	
39	12	6	Kenta Hirai (JPN)	24.30	
40	13	0	Tomáš Plevko (CZE)	24.31	
41	10	3	Ozan Gider (TUR)	24.44	
42	10	4	Thomas Gossland (CAN)	24.45	
43	12	1	Hoang Quy Phuoc (VIE)	24.53	
44	10	9	Andrew Chetcuti (MLT)	24.56	NR
45	8	3	Emmanuel Crescimbeni (PER)	24.64	
46	9	8	Pjotr Degtjarjov (EST)	24.65	
47	10	0	Afshin Asgari (IRI)	24.79	
48	9	2	Hsu Chi-Chieh (TPE)	24.84	
49	11	4	Joaquin Belza (ARG)	24.88	
50	9	1	Orri Freyr Gudmundsson (ISL)	25.03	
51	8	4	Jose Lobo Martinez (PAR)	25.06	
52	10	6	Ramadhan Abdallah Vyombo (KEN)	25.08	
53	9	4	Teimuraz Kobakhidze (GEO)	25.22	
54	9	9	Radhames Kalaf (DOM)	25.23	
55	9	6	Lao Kuan Fong (MAC)	25.25	
55	10	7	Ng Kai Wee Rainer (SIN)	25.25	
57	9	0	Pavel Izbisciuc (MDA)	25.26	
58	2	6	Ayman Klzie (SYR)	25.30	
59	2	1	Anthonny Sitraka Ralefy (MAD)	25.45	
60	8	2	Roy Barahona (HON)	25.52	
61	8	6	Vahan Mkhitaryan (ARM)	25.57	
62	7	9	Andrew Rutherfurd (BOL)	25.63	NR
63	8	5	Samson Opuakpo (NGR)	25.72	
64	10	8	Timothy Wynter (JAM)	25.74	
65	7	0	Sean Gunn (ZIM)	25.79	
66	1	5	Adrian Todd (BOT)	25.84	
67	7	2	Ahmad Attellesey (LBA)	25.91	
68	9	7	Mohammed Al-Ghafri (UAE)	25.94	
69	8	9	Dulguun Batsaikhan (MGL)	26.18	
70	6	7	Oriol Cuñat (AND)	26.23	
71	7	4	Sio Ka Kun (MAC)	26.26	
71	8	8	Valdo Lourenço (MOZ)	26.26	
73	7	3	James Sanderson (GIB)	26.31	
74	6	6	Ralph Goveia (ZAM)	26.34	
75	7	1	Fernando Medrano Medina (NCA)	26.36	
76	7	8	Rahul Monal Chokshi (IND)	26.43	
77	8	1	Julian Harding (MLT)	26.44	
78	7	6	Nuno Rola (ANG)	26.45	
79	9	5	Abdoul Khadre Mbaye Niane (SEN)	26.53	
80	7	5	Sergeý Krowýakow (TKM)	26.56	
81	5	4	Esau Simpson (GRN)	26.81	
82	11	0	Mbeh Tanji (CMR)	26.82	
83	8	0	Omar Omar (BHR)	26.86	
84	6	5	David van der Colff (BOT)	26.96	
85	6	8	Stanford Gore Kawale (PNG)	27.02	
86	6	0	Paul Elaisa (FIJ)	27.04	
87	5	1	Julien Brice (LCA)	27.24	
88	6	2	Hilal Hemed Hilal (TAN)	27.25	
88	8	7	Omar Mithqal (JOR)	27.25	
90	6	1	Adam Viktora (SEY)	27.32	
91	6	4	Zaur Arkaniya (AZE)	27.50	
92	5	0	Roman Hramtsov (TKM)	27.61	
93	3	8	Borhane Ahmed Mohamed Abro (DJI)	27.67	
94	6	9	Tepaia Zac Payne (COK)	27.88	
95	5	5	Alassane Sylla (CIV)	27.92	
96	4	4	Tolga Akcayli (VIN)	28.02	
97	5	8	Milimo Mweetwa (ZAM)	28.06	
98	4	5	Khalid Baba (BHR)	28.11	
99	5	6	Giordan Harris (MHL)	28.30	
100	5	7	Erdenemunkh Demuul (MGL)	28.38	
101	5	2	C. Andrews (COK)	28.50	
102	4	6	Joseph Seguina (GUY)	28.56	
103	1	4	Aung Thiha (MYA)	28.61	
104	6	3	Oliver Quick (GIB)	28.69	
105	4	7	Conrad Gaira (UGA)	28.91	
106	4	2	Hannibal Gaskin (GUY)	28.94	
107	2	0	Mamadou Amara Soumare (MLI)	29.13	
108	5	3	Mohamed Muthasim Adnan (MDV)	29.22	
109	5	9	Abdulrahman Al-Kuwari (QAT)	29.39	
110	4	1	Umarkhon Alizoda (TJK)	29.45	
111	4	0	Franc Aleksi (ALB)	29.48	
112	4	8	Saylom Souvannala (LAO)	30.49	
113	3	4	Jamal Tamasese (SAM)	30.91	
114	3	6	Mukhammad Khakimov (TJK)	31.61	
115	2	3	Adam David Kitururu (TAN)	32.32	
116	1	7	Eloi Imaniraguha (RWA)	32.92	
117	3	7	Chavez Joseph (VIN)	34.73	
	1	2	Moris Beale (SLE)	DSQ	
	1	6	Kamara Osman (SLE)	DSQ	
	2	7	Moise Ngondo (COD)	DSQ	
	3	0	Martti Aljand (EST)	DSQ	
	9	3	Sarma Nair (IND)	DSQ	
	1	1	Sorie Marah (SLE)	DNS	
	2	2	Abdourahman Mohamed (DJI)	DNS	
	2	5	Konrad Czerniak (POL)	DNS	
	3	1	Aonzoudine Chaoili (COM)	DNS	
	3	2	Athoumani Youssouf (COM)	DNS	
	3	3	Ayoub Kalfo (SUD)	DNS	
	3	5	Ralph Benjamin Teiko Quaye (GHA)	DNS	
	3	9	Essossimana Awizoba (TOG)	DNS	
	4	3	Kensuke Kimura (NMI)	DNS	
	4	9	Kofi Komla Anku (GHA)	DNS	
	7	7	João Aguiar (ANG)	DNS	
	10	2	Ryan Lochte (USA)	DNS	
	13	4	Rafael Muñoz (ESP)	DNS	
	13	7	Aleksander Hetland (NOR)	DNS	

=== Semifinals ===
Rank	Heat	Lane	Name	Nationality	Time	Notes
1	2	4	Nicholas Santos	Brazil	22.23	Q, CR
2	1	6	Tom Shields	United States	22.58	Q
3	1	2	Frédérick Bousquet	France	22.61	Q
4	1	4	Chad le Clos	South Africa	22.70	Q
5	1	3	Peter Mankoč	Slovenia	22.82	Q
6	2	3	Andriy Hovorov	Ukraine	22.93	Q
7	2	2	Joeri Verlinden	Netherlands	22.98	Q
8	1	5	Wu Peng	China	23.05	Q
9	1	7	François Heersbrandt	Belgium	23.10	NR
10	2	5	Yauhen Tsurkin	Belarus	23.16	
11	2	7	Kaio de Almeida	Brazil	23.20	
12	2	1	Ben Hockin	Paraguay	23.36	
13	1	1	Barry Murphy	Ireland	23.39	NR
14	2	6	Jason Dunford	Kenya	23.42	
15	2	8	Romain Sassot	France	23.57	
16	1	8	Evgeny Koptelov	Russia	23.62	

=== Final ===
The final was held at 19:52.

Rank	Lane	Name	Nationality	Time	Notes
1st place, gold medalist(s)	4	Nicholas Santos	Brazil	22.22	CR
2nd place, silver medalist(s)	6	Chad le Clos	South Africa	22.26	
3rd place, bronze medalist(s)	5	Tom Shields	United States	22.46	NR
4	3	Frédérick Bousquet	France	22.61	
5	8	Wu Peng	China	22.78	
6	7	Andriy Hovorov	Ukraine	22.85	
7	1	Joeri Verlinden	Netherlands	22.90	
8	2	Peter Mankoč	Slovenia	22.94	
