= Swimming at the 2012 European Aquatics Championships – Men's 100 metre butterfly =

Men's 100 metre butterfly at the 2012 European Aquatics Championships
- Dates: May 25, 2012 (heats and semifinals); May 26, 2012 (final)
- Competitors: 53 from 27 nations
- Winning time: 51.45

Medalists
gold medal	Milorad Čavić	Serbia
silver medal	László Cseh	Hungary
bronze medal	Matteo Rivolta	Italy

The men's 100 metre butterfly competition of the swimming events at the 2012 European Aquatics Championships took place May 25 and 26. The heats and semifinals took place on May 25, the final on May 26.

== Records ==
Prior to the competition, the existing world, European and championship records were as follows.

	Name	Nation	Time	Location	Date
World record	Michael Phelps	United States	49.82	Rome	August 1, 2009
European record	Milorad Čavić	Serbia	49.95	Rome	August 1, 2009
Championship record	Yevgeny Korotyshkin	Russia	51.73	Budapest	August 14, 2010

== Results ==
=== Heats ===
55 swimmers participated in 7 heats.

Rank	Heat	Lane	Name	Nationality	Time	Notes
1	7	4	László Cseh	Hungary	52.32	Q
2	7	1	Matteo Rivolta	Italy	52.43	Q
3	5	4	Milorad Čavić	Serbia	52.46	Q
4	5	1	Bence Pulai	Hungary	52.68	Q
5	7	5	François Heersbrandt	Belgium	52.72	Q
6	6	6	Dinko Jukić	Austria	52.73	Q
7	6	3	Peter Mankoč	Slovenia	52.75	Q
8	6	8	Piero Codia	Italy	52.76	Q
9	6	5	Ivan Lenđer	Serbia	52.86	Q
10	7	3	Philip Heintz	Germany	52.91	Q
11	6	4	Nikita Konovalov	Russia	52.96	Q
12	5	3	Rafael Muñoz	Spain	53.01	Q
13	6	2	Pavel Sankovich	Belarus	53.04	Q
14	5	7	Ádám Madarassy	Hungary	53.10	
15	7	6	Romain Sassot	France	53.12	Q
16	5	5	Lars Frölander	Sweden	53.23	Q
17	6	1	Yauhen Tsurkin	Belarus	53.27	Q
18	5	6	Mehdy Metella	France	53.47	
19	7	8	Alexandru Coci	Romania	53.51	
20	3	5	Denys Dubrov	Ukraine	53.54	
21	4	2	Tiago Venâncio	Portugal	53.56	
22	4	5	Alon Mandel	Israel	53.57	
23	3	3	Martin Spitzer	Austria	53.59	
23	7	2	Simão Morgado	Portugal	53.59	
25	4	8	Nico van Duijn	Switzerland	53.63	
26	5	2	Marco Belotti	Italy	53.84	
27	4	4	Stefanos Dimitriadis	Greece	53.85	
28	2	3	Robert Žbogar	Slovenia	53.89	
29	2	4	Tom Kremer	Israel	53.97	
30	4	7	Jan Šefl	Czech Republic	53.99	
31	3	2	Fotios Koliopoulos	Greece	54.05	
32	3	8	Michal Poprawa	Poland	54.09	
33	4	6	Bence Biczó	Hungary	54.10	
34	6	7	Mario Todorović	Croatia	54.17	
35	3	4	Stefano Mauro Pizzamiglio	Italy	54.27	
36	4	1	Diogo Carvalho	Portugal	54.34	
37	3	6	Alexandre Liess	Switzerland	54.49	
38	3	1	Martin Verner	Czech Republic	54.54	
39	7	7	Duarte Rafael Mourao	Portugal	54.56	
40	3	7	Martin Liivamägi	Estonia	54.62	
41	1	3	Jonathan Massacand	Switzerland	54.92	
42	1	2	Yury Suvorau	Belarus	55.04	
43	2	1	Lubos Grznar	Slovakia	55.23	
44	1	4	Sindri Thor Jakobsson	Norway	55.37	
45	1	1	Martti Aljand	Estonia	55.40	
46	2	8	Pavels Kondrahins	Latvia	55.53	
47	2	2	Bernhard Wolf	Austria	55.62	
48	2	6	Niksa Roki	Croatia	55.66	
49	1	5	Edgaras Štura	Lithuania	55.70	
50	1	6	Tadas Duškinas	Lithuania	55.71	
51	2	5	Konstantinos Markozis	Greece	55.76	
52	2	7	Raphaël Stacchiotti	Luxembourg	55.90	
53	1	7	Avi Cohen	Israel	55.91	
	4	3	Duje Draganja	Croatia	DNS	
	5	8	Vytautas Janušaitis	Lithuania	DNS	

=== Semifinal ===
The eight fasters swimmers advanced to the final.

==== Semifinal 1 ====
Rank	Lane	Name	Nationality	Time	Notes
1	7	Rafael Muñoz	Spain	52.48	Q
2	4	Matteo Rivolta	Italy	52.52	Q
3	5	Bence Pulai	Hungary	52.56	Q
4	2	Philip Heintz	Germany	52.91	
4	3	Dinko Jukić	Austria	52.91	
6	6	Piero Codia	Italy	52.93	
7	1	Romain Sassot	France	53.03	
8	8	Yauhen Tsurkin	Belarus	53.07	

==== Semifinal 2 ====
Rank	Lane	Name	Nationality	Time	Notes
1	4	László Cseh	Hungary	51.95	Q, NR
2	5	Milorad Čavić	Serbia	52.08	Q
3	2	Ivan Lenđer	Serbia	52.34	Q
4	7	Nikita Konovalov	Russia	52.38	Q
5	6	Peter Mankoč	Slovenia	52.65	Q
6	3	François Heersbrandt	Belgium	52.68	
7	8	Lars Frölander	Sweden	52.86	
8	1	Pavel Sankovich	Belarus	53.12	

=== Final ===
The final was held at 17:27.

Rank	Lane	Name	Nationality	Time	Notes
1st place, gold medalist(s)	5	Milorad Čavić	Serbia	51.45	CR
2nd place, silver medalist(s)	4	László Cseh	Hungary	51.77	NR
3rd place, bronze medalist(s)	7	Matteo Rivolta	Italy	52.40	
4	3	Ivan Lenđer	Serbia	52.54	
5	2	Rafael Muñoz	Spain	52.71	
6	8	Peter Mankoč	Slovenia	52.89	
7	6	Nikita Konovalov	Russia	52.96	
8	1	Bence Pulai	Hungary	53.04	
