= Swimming at the 2014 European Aquatics Championships – Men's 50 metre butterfly =

Men's 50 metre butterfly at the Swimming at the 2014 European Aquatics Championships
- Dates: 18–19 August
- Competitors: 58 from 31 nations
- Winning time: 23.00

Medalists
gold medal	Florent Manaudou	France
gold medal	Yauhen Tsurkin	Belarus
bronze medal	Andriy Hovorov	Ukraine
bronze medal	Ben Proud	Great Britain

The Men's 50 metre butterfly competition of the 2014 European Aquatics Championships was held on 18–19 August.

== Records ==
Prior to the competition, the existing world, European and championship records were as follows.

	Name	Nation	Time	Location	Date
World record	Rafael Muñoz	Spain	22.43	Málaga	5 April 2009
European record	Rafael Muñoz	Spain	22.43	Málaga	5 April 2009
Championship record	Milorad Čavić	Serbia	23.11	Eindhoven	19 March 2008

== Results ==
=== Heats ===
The heats were held at 11:15.

Rank	Heat	Lane	Name	Nationality	Time	Notes
1	5	4	Andriy Hovorov	Ukraine	22.87	Q, CR
2	6	5	Florent Manaudou	France	23.06	Q
3	7	5	Steffen Deibler	Germany	23.38	Q
4	5	5	Rafael Muñoz	Spain	23.43	Q
5	7	4	Yauhen Tsurkin	Belarus	23.54	Q
6	6	4	Ben Proud	Great Britain	23.55	Q
7	7	3	Piero Codia	Italy	23.58	Q
8	5	3	Nikita Konovalov	Russia	23.61	Q
9	7	2	Joeri Verlinden	Netherlands	23.68	Q
10	6	8	László Cseh	Hungary	23.73	Q
11	7	6	Mario Todorović	Croatia	23.84	Q
12	5	7	François Heersbrandt	Belgium	23.95	Q
13	6	0	Tadas Duškinas	Lithuania	23.98	Q
14	5	6	Ivan Lenđer	Serbia	24.02	Q
15	3	5	Tuomas Pokkinen	Finland	24.04	Q
15	6	3	Adam Barrett	Great Britain	24.04	Q
17	6	7	Yevgeny Korotyshkin	Russia	24.07	
18	6	1	Viacheslav Prudnikov	Russia	24.11	
19	5	0	Pavel Sankovich	Belarus	24.23	
19	5	1	Riku Pöytäkivi	Finland	24.23	
21	5	8	Jan Šefl	Czech Republic	24.24	
21	7	8	Kristian Golomeev	Greece	24.24	
23	3	0	Krisztián Takács	Hungary	24.27	
24	2	2	Mindaugas Sadauskas	Lithuania	24.30	
25	4	5	Martin Spitzer	Austria	24.31	
26	3	9	Viktor Bromer	Denmark	24.33	
27	7	7	Radovan Siljevski	Serbia	24.38	
28	4	9	Robert Žbogar	Slovenia	24.40	
29	4	4	Bence Pulai	Hungary	24.41	
30	3	3	Almog Olshtein	Israel	24.42	
31	7	0	Deividas Margevicius	Lithuania	24.44	
32	3	2	Nico van Duijn	Switzerland	24.50	
33	3	6	Nikša Stojkovski	Croatia	24.51	
33	6	2	Matteo Rivolta	Italy	24.51	
35	1	3	Tom Kremer	Israel	24.54	
36	7	9	Romain Sassot	France	24.58	
36	2	8	Alexandru Coci	Romania	24.58	
38	5	9	Baslakov İskender	Turkey	24.63	
39	4	6	Péter Holoda	Hungary	24.66	
40	3	1	Sindri Thor Jakobsson	Iceland	24.68	
41	4	2	Paul Lemaire	France	24.73	
41	4	3	Christos Katrantzis	Greece	24.73	
43	4	7	Andreas Vazaios	Greece	24.75	
44	2	7	Martin Verner	Czech Republic	24.80	
44	2	1	Julien Henx	Luxembourg	24.80	
46	4	1	Michal Navara	Slovakia	24.83	
47	3	4	Viktar Staselovich	Belarus	24.89	
48	4	8	Filip Milcevic	Austria	24.96	
49	2	5	Alexandre Bakhtiarov	Cyprus	25.02	
50	3	7	Brendan Hyland	Ireland	25.10	
51	2	6	Konstantinos Markozis	Greece	25.11	
52	3	8	Alexandre Haldemann	Switzerland	25.13	
53	1	4	Pjotr Degtjarjov	Estonia	25.19	
54	2	3	Ari-Pekka Liukkonen	Finland	25.29	
55	2	9	Etay Gurevich	Israel	25.40	
56	2	4	Teimuraz Kobakhidze	Georgia	25.51	
57	2	0	Daniel Skaaning	Denmark	25.68	
58	1	5	Fred Karu	Estonia	25.71	
—	4	0	Sidni Hoxha	Albania		DNS
—	5	2	Evgeny Koptelov	Russia		DNS
—	6	6	Konrad Czerniak	Poland		DNS
—	7	1	Mehdy Metella	France		DNS

=== Semifinals ===
The Semifinals were held at 19:02.

==== Semifinal 1 ====
Rank	Lane	Name	Nationality	Time	Notes
1	4	Florent Manaudou	France	23.23	Q
2	5	Rafael Muñoz	Spain	23.48	Q
3	3	Ben Proud	Great Britain	23.49	Q
4	8	Adam Barrett	Great Britain	23.51	Q
5	1	Ivan Lenđer	Serbia	23.68	
6	6	Nikita Konovalov	Russia	23.70	
7	7	François Heersbrandt	Belgium	23.84	
8	2	László Cseh	Hungary	23.95	

==== Semifinal 2 ====
Rank	Lane	Name	Nationality	Time	Notes
1	4	Andriy Hovorov	Ukraine	23.04	Q
2	5	Steffen Deibler	Germany	23.41	Q
3	6	Piero Codia	Italy	23.47	Q
4	3	Yauhen Tsurkin	Belarus	23.60	Q
5	1	Tadas Duškinas	Lithuania	23.72	
6	2	Joeri Verlinden	Netherlands	23.79	
7	7	Mario Todorović	Croatia	23.83	
8	8	Tuomas Pokkinen	Finland	24.02	

=== Final ===
The final was held at 18:07.

Rank	Lane	Name	Nationality	Time	Notes
1st place, gold medalist(s)	5	Florent Manaudou	France	23.00	
1st place, gold medalist(s)	8	Yauhen Tsurkin	Belarus	23.00	
3rd place, bronze medalist(s)	4	Andriy Hovorov	Ukraine	23.21	
3rd place, bronze medalist(s)	7	Ben Proud	Great Britain	23.21	
5	2	Rafael Muñoz	Spain	23.24	
6	6	Piero Codia	Italy	23.37	
7	1	Adam Barrett	Great Britain	23.40	
8	3	Steffen Deibler	Germany	23.64	
