= Swimming at the 2012 European Aquatics Championships – Men's 50 metre butterfly =

Men's 50 metre butterfly at the 2012 European Aquatics Championships
- Dates: May 21, 2012 (heats and semifinals); May 22, 2012 (final)
- Competitors: 44 from 27 nations
- Winning time: 23.16

Medalists
gold medal	Rafael Muñoz	Spain
silver medal	Frédérick Bousquet	France
bronze medal	Yauhen Tsurkin	Belarus

The men's 50 metre butterfly competition of the swimming events at the 2012 European Aquatics Championships took place May 21 and 22. The heats and semifinals took place on May 21, the final on May 22.

== Records ==
Prior to the competition, the existing world, European and championship records were as follows.

	Name	Nation	Time	Location	Date
World record European record	Rafael Muñoz	Spain	22.43	Málaga	April 5, 2009
Championship record	Milorad Čavić	Serbia	23.11	Eindhoven	March 19, 2008

== Results ==
=== Heats ===
44 swimmers participated in 6 heats.

Rank	Heat	Lane	Name	Nationality	Time	Notes
1	4	4	Frédérick Bousquet	France	23.60	Q
2	6	3	Milorad Čavić	Serbia	23.70	Q
3	4	5	Rafael Muñoz	Spain	23.76	Q
4	6	4	Nikita Konovalov	Russia	23.78	Q
5	4	3	Francois Heersbrandt	Belgium	23.81	Q
6	6	2	Piero Codia	Italy	23.87	Q
7	5	3	Amaury Leveaux	France	23.90	Q
8	5	6	Yauhen Tsurkin	Belarus	23.91	Q
9	5	4	Steffen Deibler	Germany	23.94	Q
10	6	7	Mario Todorović	Croatia	23.95	Q
11	6	6	Romain Sassot	France	24.04	
12	4	7	Alon Mandel	Israel	24.05	Q
13	6	5	Andriy Govorov	Ukraine	24.08	Q
14	5	5	Ivan Lenđer	Serbia	24.14	Q
15	4	2	Fotios Koliopoulos	Greece	24.20	Q
16	5	7	Martin Spitzer	Austria	24.20	Q
17	1	3	Tom Kremer	Israel	24.27	Q
18	5	2	Duje Draganja	Croatia	24.28	
19	1	6	Ádám Madarassy	Hungary	24.30	
20	4	6	Philip Heintz	Germany	24.36	
21	5	1	Simao Gomes Morgado	Portugal	24.38	
22	4	1	Bence Pulai	Hungary	24.42	
23	6	1	Marco Belotti	Italy	24.43	
24	3	6	Michal Poprawa	Poland	24.51	
25	4	8	Martin Verner	Czech Republic	24.60	
25	6	8	Norbert Trandafir	Romania	24.60	
27	3	4	Nico van Duijn	Switzerland	24.61	
28	2	1	Ari-Pekka Liukkonen	Finland	24.90	
29	5	8	Duarte Rafael Mourao	Portugal	24.98	
30	3	5	Alexandru Coci	Romania	24.99	
31	3	1	Lubos Grznar	Slovakia	25.03	
31	3	7	Tadas Duškinas	Lithuania	25.03	
33	3	2	Robert Zbogar	Slovenia	25.08	
34	2	3	Sindri Thor Jakobsson	Norway	25.15	
35	3	3	Mindaugas Sadauskas	Lithuania	25.18	
36	3	8	Marko Tiidla	Estonia	25.22	
37	2	5	Konstantinos Markozis	Greece	25.23	
38	2	4	Pavels Kondrahins	Latvia	25.26	
39	1	5	Dmitry Gorbunov	Russia	25.34	
40	2	7	Bernhard Wolf	Austria	25.59	
41	2	2	Bence Gyárfás	Hungary	25.61	
42	2	8	Avi Cohen	Israel	25.90	
43	2	6	Edgaras Štura	Lithuania	26.03	
44	1	4	Hedin Olsen	Faroe Islands	26.41	

=== Semifinals ===
The eight fastest swimmers advanced to the final.

==== Semifinal 1 ====
Rank	Lane	Name	Nationality	Time	Notes
1	4	Milorad Čavić	Serbia	23.41	Q
2	7	Andriy Govorov	Ukraine	23.43	Q
3	5	Nikita Konovalov	Russia	23.55	Q
4	6	Yauhen Tsurkin	Belarus	23.77	NR
5	3	Piero Codia	Italy	23.84	
6	2	Mario Todorović	Croatia	23.86	
7	1	Fotios Koliopoulos	Greece	23.92	
8	8	Tom Kremer	Israel	24.20	

==== Semifinal 2 ====
Rank	Lane	Name	Nationality	Time	Notes
1	6	Amaury Leveaux	France	23.51	Q
2	4	Frédérick Bousquet	France	23.68	Q
3	5	Rafael Muñoz	Spain	23.70	Q
4	1	Ivan Lenđer	Serbia	23.71	Q
5	3	Francois Heersbrandt	Belgium	23.77	
6	2	Steffen Deibler	Germany	23.96	
7	8	Martin Spitzer	Austria	24.04	
8	7	Alon Mandel	Israel	24.05	

==== Swim-off ====
The race determined the last participant for the final.

Rank	Lane	Name	Nationality	Time	Notes
1	4	Yauhen Tsurkin	Belarus	23.59	Q, NR
2	5	Francois Heersbrandt	Belgium	23.66	

=== Final ===
The final was held at 17:02.

Rank	Lane	Name	Nationality	Time	Notes
1st place, gold medalist(s)	7	Rafael Muñoz	Spain	23.16	
2nd place, silver medalist(s)	2	Frédérick Bousquet	France	23.30	
3rd place, bronze medalist(s)	8	Yauhen Tsurkin	Belarus	23.37	NR
4	6	Nikita Konovalov	Russia	23.43	
5	4	Milorad Čavić	Serbia	23.53	
5	5	Andriy Govorov	Ukraine	23.53	
7	1	Ivan Lenđer	Serbia	23.68	
8	3	Amaury Leveaux	France	23.80	
