= 2014 FINA World Swimming Championships (25 m) – Men's 50 metre butterfly =

Men's 50 metre butterfly at the 2014 FINA World Swimming Championships (25 m)
- Dates: 5 December (heats and semifinals); 6 December (final)
- Competitors: 145 from 107 nations
- Winning time: 21.95

Medalists
| gold medal | Chad le Clos | South Africa |
| silver medal | Nicholas Santos | Brazil |
| bronze medal | Andriy Hovorov | Ukraine |

The Men's 50 metre butterfly competition of the 2014 FINA World Swimming Championships (25 m) was held on 5 December with the heats and the semifinals and 6 December with the final.

== Records ==
Prior to the competition, the existing world and championship records were as follows.

| | Name | Nation | Time | Location | Date |
|---|---|---|---|---|---|
| World record | Steffen Deibler | Germany | 21.80 | Berlin | 14 November 2009 |
| Championship record | Nicholas Santos | Brazil | 22.22 | Istanbul | 15 December 2012 |

The following records were established during the competition:

| Date | Event | Name | Nation | Time | Record |
|---|---|---|---|---|---|
| 6 December | Final | Chad le Clos | South Africa | 21.95 | CR |

== Results ==
=== Heats ===
The heats were held at 10:25.

| Rank | Heat | Lane | Name | Nationality | Time | Notes |
|---|---|---|---|---|---|---|
| 1 | 15 | 4 | Chad le Clos | South Africa | 22.47 | Q |
| 2 | 11 | 4 | Albert Subirats | Venezuela | 22.60 | Q |
| 3 | 15 | 5 | Nicholas Santos | Brazil | 22.68 | Q |
| 4 | 13 | 5 | Tom Shields | United States | 22.80 | Q |
| 4 | 13 | 3 | Aleksandr Popkov | Russia | 22.80 | Q |
| 6 | 13 | 4 | Andriy Hovorov | Ukraine | 22.81 | Q |
| 7 | 14 | 5 | Yauhen Tsurkin | Belarus | 22.85 | Q |
| 7 | 14 | 2 | Mehdy Metella | France | 22.85 | Q |
| 9 | 15 | 6 | Adam Barrett | Great Britain | 22.87 | Q |
| 10 | 14 | 3 | Matt Grevers | United States | 22.94 | Q |
| 11 | 14 | 1 | Brett Fraser | Cayman Islands | 22.95 | Q |
| 12 | 12 | 0 | Shinri Shioura | Japan | 22.97 | Q |
| 13 | 13 | 7 | David Morgan | Australia | 23.03 | Q |
| 14 | 14 | 6 | Henrique Martins | Brazil | 23.07 | Q |
| 15 | 14 | 7 | François Heersbrandt | Belgium | 23.17 | Q |
| 15 | 15 | 3 | Nikita Konovalov | Russia | 23.17 | Q |
| 17 | 12 | 6 | Paweł Korzeniowski | Poland | 23.18 | |
| 18 | 14 | 8 | Ben Proud | Great Britain | 23.21 | |
| 19 | 12 | 5 | Jan Šefl | Czech Republic | 23.23 | |
| 19 | 12 | 3 | Mario Todorović | Croatia | 23.23 | |
| 21 | 15 | 2 | Tommaso D'Orsogna | Australia | 23.24 | |
| 22 | 13 | 1 | Alexandre Haldemann | Switzerland | 23.26 | |
| 22 | 13 | 0 | Marco Belotti | Italy | 23.26 | |
| 22 | 15 | 7 | Zhang Qibin | China | 23.26 | |
| 25 | 14 | 0 | Tadas Duškinas | Lithuania | 23.28 | |
| 26 | 12 | 1 | Ryan Pini | Papua New Guinea | 23.31 | |
| 26 | 13 | 6 | Joshua McLeod | Trinidad and Tobago | 23.31 | |
| 28 | 14 | 9 | Radovan Siljevski | Serbia | 23.38 | |
| 29 | 12 | 2 | Ivan Lenđer | Serbia | 23.45 | |
| 30 | 13 | 2 | Riku Poytakivi | Finland | 23.46 | |
| 31 | 15 | 1 | Matteo Rivolta | Italy | 23.50 | |
| 32 | 13 | 8 | Shi Yang | China | 23.51 | |
| 33 | 11 | 6 | Takuro Fujii | Japan | 23.53 | |
| 34 | 13 | 9 | Michał Poprawa | Poland | 23.64 | |
| 35 | 15 | 0 | Mindaugas Sadauskas | Lithuania | 23.68 | |
| 36 | 12 | 8 | Alexandru Coci | Romania | 23.69 | |
| 37 | 12 | 4 | Sindri Jakobsson | Norway | 23.73 | |
| 38 | 15 | 8 | Ben Hockin | Paraguay | 23.74 | |
| 39 | 12 | 9 | Alexander Kunert | Germany | 23.76 | |
| 40 | 11 | 0 | Martti Aljand | Estonia | 23.83 | |
| 41 | 11 | 3 | Clayton Jimmie | South Africa | 23.91 | |
| 42 | 10 | 7 | Anthonny Ralefy | Madagascar | 23.93 | |
| 43 | 11 | 7 | Péter Holoda | Hungary | 23.95 | |
| 44 | 15 | 9 | Elvis Burrows | Bahamas | 23.96 | |
| 45 | 10 | 9 | Oliver Elliot | Chile | 24.07 | |
| 46 | 10 | 6 | Marius Radu | Romania | 24.13 | |
| 47 | 9 | 6 | Jugurtha Boumali | Algeria | 24.21 | |
| 48 | 9 | 0 | Roy-Allan Burch | Bermuda | 24.26 | |
| 48 | 11 | 5 | Max Abreu | Paraguay | 24.26 | |
| 50 | 10 | 8 | Teimuraz Kobakhidze | Georgia | 24.27 | |
| 51 | 10 | 3 | Dhill Lee | Philippines | 24.28 | |
| 52 | 12 | 7 | Gabriel Melconian | Uruguay | 24.31 | |
| 53 | 11 | 2 | Andres Montoya | Colombia | 24.34 | |
| 54 | 11 | 8 | Janis Saltans | Latvia | 24.45 | |
| 55 | 8 | 7 | Renzo Tjon-A-Joe | Suriname | 24.48 | |
| 55 | 11 | 9 | Zuhayr Pigot | Suriname | 24.48 | |
| 57 | 9 | 2 | Tamás Kenderesi | Hungary | 24.54 | |
| 58 | 11 | 1 | Julien Heny | Luxembourg | 24.55 | |
| 59 | 10 | 1 | Chang Kuo-chi | Chinese Taipei | 24.58 | |
| 60 | 5 | 4 | Amini Fonua | Tonga | 24.67 | |
| 61 | 10 | 4 | Chad Idensohn | Zimbabwe | 24.73 | |
| 62 | 10 | 0 | Chun Nam Derick Ng | Hong Kong | 24.75 | |
| 63 | 9 | 4 | Alexandre Bakhtiarov | Cyprus | 24.77 | |
| 63 | 9 | 1 | Islam Aslanov | Uzbekistan | 24.77 | |
| 65 | 9 | 5 | Mak Ho Lun Raymond | Hong Kong | 24.81 | |
| 66 | 8 | 4 | Kitiphat Pipimnan | Thailand | 25.05 | |
| 67 | 7 | 7 | Peter Wetzlar | Zimbabwe | 25.12 | |
| 68 | 9 | 7 | Mark Hsu | Chinese Taipei | 25.16 | |
| 69 | 6 | 0 | Nico Campbell | Jamaica | 25.28 | |
| 70 | 8 | 6 | Dulguun Batsaikhan | Mongolia | 25.34 | |
| 71 | 7 | 4 | Meli Malani | Fiji | 25.35 | |
| 71 | 7 | 5 | Oumar Touré | Mali | 25.35 | |
| 71 | 8 | 3 | Davletbaev Damir | Kyrgyzstan | 25.35 | |
| 74 | 7 | 6 | Adam Allouche | Lebanon | 25.40 | |
| 74 | 8 | 9 | Cherantha de Silva | Sri Lanka | 25.40 | |
| 76 | 7 | 3 | David van der Colff | Botswana | 25.50 | |
| 77 | 8 | 8 | Joaquin Sepulveda | Chile | 25.51 | |
| 78 | 6 | 8 | Aldo Castillo | Bolivia | 25.56 | |
| 79 | 9 | 9 | Soroush Ghandchi | Iran | 25.60 | |
| 80 | 7 | 9 | Winter Heaven | Samoa | 25.65 | |
| 81 | 6 | 4 | Mohammad Islam | Bangladesh | 25.66 | |
| 82 | 9 | 8 | Waleed Abdulrazzaq | Kuwait | 25.69 | |
| 83 | 10 | 2 | Hanser García | Cuba | 25.70 | |
| 84 | 8 | 2 | Gavin Lewis | Thailand | 25.88 | |
| 85 | 8 | 1 | Jevon Atkinson | Jamaica | 25.89 | |
| 86 | 5 | 5 | Jeremy Lim | Philippines | 25.99 | |
| 86 | 8 | 0 | Vahan Mkhitaryan | Armenia | 25.99 | |
| 88 | 4 | 4 | Valentin Gorshkov | Turkmenistan | 26.02 | |
| 89 | 6 | 9 | Stanford Kawale | Papua New Guinea | 26.06 | |
| 90 | 6 | 5 | Omar Hesham | Qatar | 26.11 | |
| 90 | 7 | 8 | Miguel Mena | Nicaragua | 26.11 | |
| 92 | 7 | 2 | Jim Sanderson | Gibraltar | 26.17 | |
| 93 | 6 | 2 | Ifeakachuku Nmor | Nigeria | 26.20 | |
| 94 | 5 | 1 | Matthew Courtis | Barbados | 26.26 | |
| 95 | 7 | 0 | Hamdan Bayusuf | Kenya | 26.28 | |
| 96 | 9 | 3 | Sio Ka Kun | Macau | 26.35 | |
| 97 | 8 | 5 | Wong Pok Iao | Macau | 26.38 | |
| 98 | 6 | 3 | Christian Nikles | Brunei | 26.40 | |
| 99 | 6 | 7 | Valdo Valdo | Mozambique | 26.55 | |
| 100 | 5 | 2 | Abeiku Jackson | Ghana | 26.78 | |
| 101 | 5 | 0 | Mahmoud Daaboul | Lebanon | 26.82 | |
| 102 | 3 | 5 | Sylla Alassane | Ivory Coast | 26.84 | |
| 103 | 4 | 2 | Gianluca Pasolini | San Marino | 26.92 | |
| 103 | 6 | 1 | Christopher Duenas | Guam | 26.92 | |
| 105 | 4 | 9 | Matar Samb | Senegal | 27.03 | |
| 106 | 6 | 6 | Ahmed Al-Hosani | United Arab Emirates | 27.05 | |
| 107 | 5 | 3 | Syed Javaid | Pakistan | 27.17 | |
| 108 | 3 | 6 | Corey Ollivierre | Grenada | 27.18 | |
| 109 | 4 | 5 | Kamran Jafarov | Azerbaijan | 27.19 | |
| 110 | 5 | 6 | Franci Aleksi | Albania | 27.43 | |
| 111 | 5 | 9 | González Leonardo | Honduras | 27.46 | |
| 112 | 3 | 2 | Giordan Harris | Marshall Islands | 27.54 | |
| 113 | 5 | 7 | Kgosietsile Molefinyane | Botswana | 27.57 | |
| 114 | 3 | 3 | Nikolas Sylvester | Saint Vincent and the Grenadines | 27.66 | |
| 115 | 3 | 1 | Justine Rodriguez | Federated States of Micronesia | 27.67 | |
| 116 | 4 | 6 | Ibrahim Nishwan | Maldives | 27.68 | |
| 117 | 4 | 3 | Noah Mascoll-Gomes | Antigua and Barbuda | 27.85 | |
| 118 | 4 | 0 | Adam Moncherry | Seychelles | 27.88 | |
| 119 | 5 | 8 | Ahmed Al-Mutairy | Iraq | 28.09 | |
| 120 | 4 | 8 | Binald Mahmuti | Albania | 28.15 | |
| 121 | 3 | 7 | Emil Rahmatulin | Turkmenistan | 28.60 | |
| 122 | 3 | 0 | Mamadou Soumaré | Mali | 28.73 | |
| 123 | 4 | 1 | Arnold Kisulo | Uganda | 28.82 | |
| 124 | 3 | 9 | Aliasger Karimjee | Tanzania | 29.00 | |
| 125 | 4 | 7 | Abdulrahman Al-Kawari | Qatar | 29.11 | |
| 126 | 3 | 8 | Omar Adams | Guyana | 29.20 | |
| 127 | 1 | 4 | Rami Abunahla | Palestine | 29.52 | |
| 128 | 2 | 7 | Shawn Dingilius | Palau | 29.93 | |
| 129 | 2 | 6 | Idriss Mutankabandi | Burundi | 29.94 | |
| 130 | 2 | 5 | Akhmadzhanovich Umarov | Tajikistan | 30.09 | |
| 131 | 1 | 5 | Chaoili Chaoili | Comoros | 31.08 | |
| 132 | 2 | 2 | Yousef Al-Nehmi | Yemen | 31.21 | |
| 133 | 2 | 0 | Justin Payet | Seychelles | 31.31 | |
| 134 | 2 | 1 | Tanner Poppe | Guam | 31.34 | |
| 135 | 1 | 3 | Slava Sihanouvong | Laos | 31.50 | |
| 136 | 2 | 3 | Billy-Scott Irakoze | Burundi | 31.75 | |
| 137 | 2 | 4 | Petero Okotai | Cook Islands | 31.82 | |
| 138 | 3 | 4 | Albarchir Moctar | Niger | 33.51 | |
| 139 | 2 | 9 | Awoussou Ablam | Benin | 34.38 | |
| 140 | 1 | 2 | Eric Niyonsaba | Rwanda | 34.90 | |
| — | 1 | 6 | Jynior Ndinga | Republic of the Congo | | DNS |
| — | 7 | 1 | Ali Al-Kaabi | United Arab Emirates | | DNS |
| — | 10 | 5 | Ari-Pekka Liukkonen | Finland | | DNS |
| — | 14 | 4 | Florent Manaudou | France | | DNS |
| — | 2 | 8 | Andrew Fowler | Guyana | | DSQ |

=== Semifinals ===
The semifinals were held at 18:17.

==== Semifinal 1 ====
| Rank | Lane | Name | Nationality | Time | Notes |
|---|---|---|---|---|---|
| 1 | 3 | Andriy Hovorov | Ukraine | 22.61 | Q |
| 2 | 5 | Tom Shields | United States | 22.70 | Q |
| 3 | 6 | Mehdy Metella | France | 22.71 | Q |
| 4 | 8 | Nikita Konovalov | Russia | 22.91 | |
| 5 | 4 | Albert Subirats | Venezuela | 22.93 | |
| 6 | 7 | Shinri Shioura | Japan | 22.94 | |
| 7 | 1 | Henrique Martins | Brazil | 23.42 | |
| 8 | 2 | Matt Grevers | United States | 23.50 | |

==== Semifinal 2 ====
| Rank | Lane | Name | Nationality | Time | Notes |
|---|---|---|---|---|---|
| 1 | 4 | Chad le Clos | South Africa | 22.20 | Q |
| 2 | 5 | Nicholas Santos | Brazil | 22.48 | Q |
| 3 | 6 | Yauhen Tsurkin | Belarus | 22.54 | Q |
| 4 | 3 | Aleksandr Popkov | Russia | 22.59 | Q |
| 4 | 8 | François Heersbrandt | Belgium | 22.59 | Q |
| 6 | 2 | Adam Barrett | Great Britain | 22.90 | |
| 7 | 1 | David Morgan | Australia | 22.98 | |
| 8 | 7 | Brett Fraser | Cayman Islands | 23.35 | |

=== Final ===
The final were held at 18:52.

| Rank | Lane | Name | Nationality | Time | Notes |
|---|---|---|---|---|---|
| 1st place, gold medalist(s) | 4 | Chad le Clos | South Africa | 21.95 | CR |
| 2nd place, silver medalist(s) | 5 | Nicholas Santos | Brazil | 22.08 | AM |
| 3rd place, bronze medalist(s) | 7 | Andriy Hovorov | Ukraine | 22.49 | |
| 4 | 6 | Aleksandr Popkov | Russia | 22.53 | |
| 5 | 1 | Tom Shields | United States | 22.57 | |
| 6 | 3 | Yauhen Tsurkin | Belarus | 22.63 | |
| 7 | 8 | Mehdy Metella | France | 22.68 | |
| 8 | 2 | François Heersbrandt | Belgium | 22.69 | |
