= Swimming at the 2009 World Aquatics Championships – Men's 50 metre butterfly =

Men's 50 metre butterfly at the 2009 FINA World Championships
- Venue: Foro Italico
- Dates: 26 July 2009 (heats, semifinals); 27 July 2009 (final)
- Competitors: 204
- Winning time: 22.67 seconds

Medalists
gold medal	Milorad Čavić	Serbia
silver medal	Matt Targett	Australia
bronze medal	Rafael Muñoz	Spain

The heats for the men's 50 metre butterfly race at the 2009 World Championships occurred on Sunday, 26 July at the Foro Italico in Rome, Italy.

== Records ==
Prior to this competition, the existing world and competition records were as follows:

World record	Rafael Muñoz (ESP)	22.43	Málaga, Spain	5 April 2009
Championship record	Roland Schoeman (RSA)	22.96	Montreal, Canada	25 July 2005

The following records were established during the competition:

Date	Round	Name	Nationality	Time	Record
26 July	Heat 20	Roland Schoeman	South Africa	22.90	CR
26 July	Heat 21	Rafael Muñoz	Spain	22.90	=CR
26 July	Semifinal 1	Rafael Muñoz	Spain	22.68	CR
27 July	Final	Milorad Čavić	Serbia	22.67	CR

== Results ==
=== Heats ===
Rank	Name	Nationality	Time	Heat	Lane	Notes
1	Roland Schoeman	South Africa	22.90	20	5	CR, AF
2	Rafael Muñoz	Spain	22.90	21	4	=CR
3	Milorad Čavić	Serbia	22.93	21	5	NR
4	Jakob Andkjær	Denmark	23.04	21	3	NR
5	Andrew Lauterstein	Australia	23.10	19	5	
6	Duje Draganja	Croatia	23.14	18	2	
7	Jernej Godec	Slovenia	23.20	20	3	
8	Albert Subirats	Venezuela	23.23	18	4	SA
8	Nicholas Santos	Brazil	23.23	20	6	=SA
8	Matt Targett	Australia	23.23	20	4	
11	Yevgeny Korotyshkin	Russia	23.24	21	6	NR
12	Sergiy Breus	Ukraine	23.35	20	7	NR
13	Jason Dunford	Kenya	23.40	19	4	
13	Corney Swanepoel	New Zealand	23.40	21	0	NR
15	Mario Todorović	Croatia	23.45	20	1	
16	Graeme Moore	South Africa	23.48	20	8	
17	Thomas Rupprath	Germany	23.49	21	7	
18	Ivan Lenđer	Serbia	23.51	21	8	
19	Johannes Dietrich	Germany	23.55	19	3	
20	Kaio de Almeida	Brazil	23.60	21	2	
21	Mattia Nalesso	Italy	23.65	19	8	
21	Paolo Facchinelli	Italy	23.65	21	1	
23	Octavio Alesi	Venezuela	23.67	18	6	
24	Martin Spitzer	Austria	23.69	17	5	NR
25	Ryo Takayasu	Japan	23.73	19	2	
26	Elvis Burrows	Bahamas	23.74	16	7	NR
27	Stefanos Dimitriadis	Greece	23.75	18	3	
27	Romain Sassot	France	23.75	20	2	
29	Daniel Bell	New Zealand	23.76	21	9	
30	Douglas Clark Lennox II	Puerto Rico	23.88	8	4	NR
31	Alon Mandel	Israel	23.90	16	8	NR
31	Masayuki Kishida	Japan	23.90	20	0	
33	Zhou Jiawei	China	23.91	19	6	
34	François Heersbrandt	Belgium	23.92	18	5	NR
35	Tyler McGill	United States	23.93	17	7	
36	Michal Rubáček	Czech Republic	23.94	18	9	
37	Ryan Pini	Papua New Guinea	23.95	16	9	
38	Krisztián Takács	Hungary	23.97	18	1	
39	Matt Grevers	United States	23.98	18	0	
40	Andrejs Dūda	Latvia	24.03	12	4	
41	Joe Bartoch	Canada	24.04	18	7	
42	Romāns Miloslavskis	Latvia	24.05	11	5	
42	Shi Feng	China	24.05	19	9	
42	Emil Dall-Nielsen	Denmark	24.05	20	9	
45	Ian Hulme	Great Britain	24.08	16	0	
46	Dinko Jukić	Austria	24.13	17	3	
46	Diogo Carvalho	Portugal	24.13	17	6	
48	Paweł Korzeniowski	Poland	24.14	18	8	
49	Simão Morgado	Portugal	24.15	19	0	
50	Jeong Doo-Hee	South Korea	24.16	16	1	
50	Andrii Govorov	Ukraine	24.16	19	1	
52	Evgeny Lazuka	Belarus	24.18	16	4	
53	Pavel Sankovich	Belarus	24.22	17	0	
54	Michal Navara	Slovakia	24.26	14	4	
54	Norbert Trandafir	Romania	24.26	15	4	NR
56	Martin Verner	Czech Republic	24.28	17	9	
57	Virdhawal Khade	India	24.32	17	8	
58	Damien Courtois	Switzerland	24.33	17	2	
59	Shaune Fraser	Cayman Islands	24.35	14	9	
60	Daniel Bego	Malaysia	24.38	13	2	
60	Jacinto de Jesus Ayala	Dominican Republic	24.38	16	3	NR
62	Gustavo Daniel Paschetta	Argentina	24.39	17	1	
63	Marcin Babuchowski	Poland	24.40	16	6	
64	Apostolos Tsagkarakis	Greece	24.41	15	8	
65	David Dunford	Kenya	24.48	12	5	
66	Alexandru Felix Maestru	Romania	24.53	15	5	
67	Goksu Bicer	Turkey	24.57	15	3	
68	Glenn Victor Sutanto	Indonesia	24.58	14	8	
69	Paulius Viktoravicius	Lithuania	24.62	15	6	
70	Robi Zbogar	Slovenia	24.67	15	7	
71	Daniel Coakley	Philippines	24.71	6	3	NR
72	Pablo Marmolejo	Mexico	24.73	13	1	
73	Nadav Kochavi	Israel	24.74	14	0	
74	Alexandre Bakhtiarov	Cyprus	24.77	16	2	
75	Grant Beahan	Zimbabwe	24.89	12	9	NR
75	Daniel Rast	Switzerland	24.89	16	5	
77	Martin Liivamägi	Estonia	24.90	15	9	
78	Stanislav Kuzmin	Kazakhstan	24.91	14	5	
79	Rimvydas Salcius	Lithuania	24.92	12	6	
80	Norbert Trudman	Slovakia	24.96	17	4	
81	Yellow Yeiyah	Nigeria	25.06	8	6	
81	Joshua Mc Leod	Trinidad and Tobago	25.06	14	7	
83	Fernando Castellanos	Guatemala	25.13	9	3	
84	Tan Xue Wei Nicholas	Singapore	25.15	14	3	
85	Rustam Khudiyev	Kazakhstan	25.19	15	2	
86	Danil Bugakov	Uzbekistan	25.24	15	1	
87	Hsu Chi-Chieh	Chinese Taipei	25.25	14	2	
88	Wong Wing Cheung Victor	Macau	25.26	13	5	
89	Conor Leaney	Ireland	25.27	13	3	
90	João Matias	Angola	25.28	12	8	NR
91	Juan Cambindo Romanos	Colombia	25.30	13	9	
92	Bader Almuhana	Saudi Arabia	25.31	13	8	
93	Carlos Viveros Madariaga	Colombia	25.33	15	0	
94	Serghei Falcas	Moldova	25.40	12	2	
95	Kaspar Raigla	Estonia	25.53	13	7	
96	Branden Whitehurst	Virgin Islands	25.58	6	7	NR
96	Kareem Ennab	Jordan	25.58	12	7	
98	Fabio Persano	Paraguay	25.59	13	4	
98	Yury Zaharov	Kyrgyzstan	25.59	13	6	
100	Anders McIntyre	Canada	25.62	9	5	
101	James Walsh	Philippines	25.63	7	6	
102	Marcelino Richaards	Suriname	25.68	11	3	
102	Brad Hamilton	Jamaica	25.68	11	0	NR
102	Bruno Miguel Esquen Blas	Peru	25.68	12	3	
105	Roy-Allan Burch	Bermuda	25.74	5	6	NR
105	Roy Barahona Fuentes	Honduras	25.74	9	6	
107	Sim Ri Jin Nicholas	Singapore	25.81	11	8	
108	Mikayel Koloyan	Armenia	25.83	8	3	
109	Achelhi Bilal	Morocco	25.84	9	4	
110	Raphaël Stacchiotti	Luxembourg	25.87	14	1	
111	Emin Noshadi	Iran	25.88	8	2	
111	Phillipe Mailliard Rodríguez	Chile	25.88	11	2	
113	Foo Jian Beng	Malaysia	25.92	11	6	
114	Yan Ho Chun	Hong Kong	25.94	12	0	
115	Pietro Camilloni	San Marino	25.97	10	4	
116	Obaid Al-Jasmi	United Arab Emirates	25.99	11	7	
117	Miguel Navarro	Bolivia	26.00	7	2	
117	Timothy Ferris	Zimbabwe	26.00	11	4	
119	Teymur Guliyev	Azerbaijan	26.02	14	6	
120	Kari Joannesarson Hoevdanum	Faroe Islands	26.03	2	0	
121	Alexander Ray	Namibia	26.16	7	9	
122	Nather Ahmed Al-Hamoud	Saudi Arabia	26.17	10	3	
123	Niall Christopher Roberts	Guyana	26.20	10	5	
124	Hycinth Cijntje	Netherlands Antilles	26.21	8	5	
125	Sergey Pankov	Uzbekistan	26.23	11	9	
126	Nguyen Vo Thai	Vietnam	26.26	11	1	
127	Erik Rajohnson	Madagascar	26.35	8	7	
127	Radhames Kalaf	Dominican Republic	26.35	10	7	
129	Rami Anis	Syria	26.42	9	8	
130	Byron Briedenhann	Namibia	26.44	7	4	
131	Oriol Cunat	Andorra	26.52	7	7	
131	Shawn Clarke	Barbados	26.52	9	1	
133	Arjun Jayaprakash	India	26.61	10	0	
134	Leonel Matonse	Mozambique	26.66	9	7	
135	Papa Madiop Ndong	Senegal	26.72	9	9	
135	Joel Romeu Lemarchand	Uruguay	26.72	10	1	
137	Fernando Medrano	Nicaragua	26.76	8	9	
138	Luke Hall	Eswatini	26.80	9	2	
139	Chong Cheok Kuan	Macau	26.82	10	8	
140	Rony Bakale	Republic of the Congo	26.98	7	0	
141	Aleksei Klimenko	Kyrgyzstan	27.02	10	9	
142	Alejandro Madde Madde	Bolivia	27.07	6	8	
142	Heimanu Sichan	Tahiti	27.07	8	0	
144	Moh'D Aqelah	Jordan	27.10	9	0	
145	Abbas Raad	Lebanon	27.14	10	6	
146	Gerusio Matonse	Mozambique	27.16	8	8	
147	Eric Arturo Medina	Panama	27.21	6	2	
147	Tural Abbasov	Azerbaijan	27.21	7	5	
149	Peter Popahun Pokawin	Papua New Guinea	27.28	5	5	
149	Jean-Luc Augier	Saint Lucia	27.28	6	5	
151	Jon Pepaj	Albania	27.30	10	2	
152	Julien Brice	Saint Lucia	27.34	7	1	
153	Adama Ouedraogo	Burkina Faso	27.47	1	5	
154	Nasir Ali	Pakistan	27.49	7	3	
155	Kerson Hadley	Federated States of Micronesia	27.50	3	5	
156	Gezim Hyka	Albania	27.52	8	1	
157	Andrey Molchanov	Turkmenistan	27.53	5	2	
158	Juan Carlos Sikaffy Diaz	Honduras	27.65	5	4	
159	Nicholas Thomson	Bermuda	27.71	7	8	
160	Fabian Gregory Binns	Guyana	27.77	2	1	
161	Sergey Pevnev	Armenia	27.78	5	1	
162	Jean Marie Froget	Mauritius	27.83	5	9	
163	Vaughn Forsythe	Barbados	27.84	6	6	
164	Anthony Clark	Tahiti	27.91	6	1	
165	Nicholas Coard	Grenada	27.98	5	8	
166	Edward Poppe	Guam	28.03	6	4	
167	Kailan Staal	Northern Mariana Islands	28.04	4	6	
168	Benjamin Gabbard	American Samoa	28.07	5	3	
169	Esau Simpsons	Grenada	28.10	4	7	
170	Peter James Lynch	Zambia	28.21	6	9	
171	Sergey Krovyakov	Turkmenistan	28.25	4	3	
171	Mark Sammut	Malta	28.25	5	7	
173	Shane Mangroo	Seychelles	28.38	4	1	
174	Gary Pineda	Guatemala	28.45	4	0	
175	Milimo Mweetwa	Zambia	28.46	5	0	
176	Jean Hugues Gregoire	Mauritius	28.53	4	4	
177	Aung Zaw Phyo	Myanmar	28.61	4	2	
178	Paul Elisa	Fiji	28.62	4	9	
179	Quenton Dupont	Grenada	28.88	3	3	
180	Siu Kent Chung	Brunei	28.92	4	8	
181	Narantsog Tsogjargal	Mongolia	29.13	6	0	
182	Michael Taylor	Marshall Islands	29.16	1	6	
183	Elaijie Erasito	Fiji	29.53	3	4	
184	Mohamed Mujahid	Maldives	29.56	3	1	
185	Petero Okotai	Cook Islands	29.72	1	4	
186	Ali Mohamed Raaidh	Maldives	29.86	3	8	
187	Wei Ching Maou	American Samoa	30.06	3	9	
188	Cooper Graf	Northern Mariana Islands	30.11	3	6	
189	Esebei Doran	Palau	31.26	2	3	
189	Alisher Chingizov	Tajikistan	31.26	4	5	
191	Samson Makere	Tanzania	31.58	2	9	
192	Jonathan Bishop	Marshall Islands	32.26	2	4	
193	Mohamed Coulibaly	Mali	32.81	2	8	
194	Said Seba	Tanzania	33.18	2	5	
195	Soulasan Soulasen	Laos	34.06	1	3	
196	Boubacar Haïdara	Guinea	37.06	3	0	
197	Abdoulkader Houssein	Djibouti	37.47	2	3	
198	Kokou Messan Amegashie	Togo	40.57	2	7	
–	Houmed Hassan Ali	Djibouti	DSQ	2	2	
–	Ingabire-Ahishakiye Gael	Burundi	DSQ	3	2	
–	Rama Leray Christ-Alex	Burundi	DSQ	3	7	
–	Hajder Ensar	Bosnia and Herzegovina	DSQ	12	1	
–	Pavels Kondrahins	Latvia	DSQ	13	0	
–	Nikita Konovalov	Russia	DSQ	19	7	

=== Semifinals ===
Rank	Name	Nationality	Time	Heat	Lane	Notes
1	Rafael Muñoz	Spain	22.68	1	4	CR
2	Milorad Čavić	Serbia	22.75	2	5	NR
3	Nicholas Santos	Brazil	23.00	2	2	AM
4	Duje Draganja	Croatia	23.03	1	3	
5	Matt Targett	Australia	23.04	1	2	
6	Albert Subirats	Venezuela	23.05	1	6	NR
7	Jason Dunford	Kenya	23.10	2	1	
8	Jakob Andkjær	Denmark	23.14	1	5	
9	Roland Schoeman	South Africa	23.18	2	4	
10	Andrew Lauterstein	Australia	23.19	2	3	
11	Graeme Moore	South Africa	23.25	1	8	
12	Jernej Godec	Slovenia	23.26	2	6	
13	Sergiy Breus	Ukraine	23.37	1	7	
13	Yevgeny Korotyshkin	Russia	23.37	2	7	
15	Corney Swanepoel	New Zealand	23.50	1	1	
16	Mario Todorović	Croatia	23.51	2	8	

=== Final ===
Rank	Name	Nationality	Time	Lane	Notes
1st place, gold medalist(s)	Milorad Čavić	Serbia	22.67	5	CR, NR
2nd place, silver medalist(s)	Matt Targett	Australia	22.73	2	OC
3rd place, bronze medalist(s)	Rafael Muñoz	Spain	22.88	4	
4	Jakob Andkjær	Denmark	22.93	8	NR
5	Nicholas Santos	Brazil	23.00	3	=AM
6	Jason Dunford	Kenya	23.04	1	NR
7	Albert Subirats	Venezuela	23.07	7	
8	Duje Draganja	Croatia	23.10	6	
