= Swimming at the 2009 World Aquatics Championships – Men's 100 metre butterfly =

Men's 100 metre butterfly at the 2009 FINA World Championships
- Venue: Foro Italico
- Dates: 31 July 2009 (heats, semifinals); 1 August 2009 (final)
- Competitors: 163
- Winning time: 49.82 WR

Medalists
gold medal	Michael Phelps	United States
silver medal	Milorad Čavić	Serbia
bronze medal	Rafael Muñoz	Spain

The men's 100 metre butterfly event at the 2009 World Aquatics Championships took place between 31 July – 1 August at the Foro Italico. Both the heats and semifinals were held on 31 July with the heats being held in the morning session and the semifinals being held in the evening session. The final was held on 1 August.

== Records ==
Prior to this competition, the existing world and competition records were as follows:

World record	Michael Phelps (USA)	50.22	Indianapolis, United States	9 July 2009
Championship record	Ian Crocker (USA)	50.40	Montreal, Canada	30 July 2005

The following records were established during the competition:

Date	Round	Name	Nationality	Time	Record
31 July	Semifinal 2	Milorad Čavić	Serbia	50.01	WR
1 August	Final	Michael Phelps	United States	49.82	WR

== Results ==
=== Heats ===
Rank	Name	Nationality	Time	Heat	Lane	Notes
1	Milorad Čavić	Serbia	50.56	15	4	NR
2	Tyler McGill	United States	50.90	15	5	
2	Michael Phelps	United States	50.90	17	4	
4	Andrew Lauterstein	Australia	50.93	16	5	
5	Albert Subirats	Venezuela	51.02	17	7	SA
6	Gabriel Mangabeira	Brazil	51.11	17	3	NR
7	Ivan Lenđer	Serbia	51.22	15	7	
7	Benjamin Starke	Germany	51.22	16	6	NR
9	Takuro Fujii	Japan	51.24	15	3	AS
10	Rafael Muñoz	Spain	51.40	16	4	
11	Peter Mankoč	Slovenia	51.49	16	3	
12	Yevgeny Korotyshkin	Russia	51.51	15	6	NR
13	Nikolay Skvortsov	Russia	51.58	15	1	
14	Michael Rock	Great Britain	51.65	16	8	NR
15	Corney Swanepoel	New Zealand	51.71	17	2	
16	Jason Dunford	Kenya	51.76	17	5	
17	Ryan Pini	Papua New Guinea	51.81	16	2	
17	Clement Lefert	France	51.81	17	6	
19	Joeri Verlinden	Netherlands	51.97	14	4	NR
19	Helge Meeuw	Germany	51.97	15	9	
21	Adam Pine	Australia	51.98	17	0	
22	Michal Rubáček	Czech Republic	51.99	12	2	
23	Robin van Aggele	Netherlands	52.04	14	3	
24	Pavel Sankovich	Belarus	52.05	13	5	
25	Zhou Jiawei	China	52.08	14	2	
25	Lyndon Ferns	South Africa	52.08	15	8	
27	Mario Todorović	Croatia	52.09	14	5	
28	Moss Burmester	New Zealand	52.13	17	8	
29	Kaio de Almeida	Brazil	52.14	15	2	
30	Denys Dubrov	Ukraine	52.21	13	9	
31	Simon Sjödin	Sweden	52.27	13	8	
31	Lars Frölander	Sweden	52.27	16	9	
33	Masayuki Kishida	Japan	52.28	17	1	
34	Jakob Andkjær	Denmark	52.34	15	0	
35	Douglas Lennox-Silva	Puerto Rico	52.39	12	4	NR
36	Pablo Marmolejo	Mexico	52.48	12	8	NR
37	Jeong Doohee	South Korea	52.50	12	3	
38	Mattia Nalesso	Italy	52.55	14	7	
38	Ian Hulme	Great Britain	52.55	17	9	
40	Joe Bartoch	Canada	52.60	14	9	
41	Alex Villaecija	Spain	52.61	16	7	
42	Sergiy Breus	Ukraine	52.63	13	0	
43	Shi Feng	China	52.64	16	1	
44	Alon Mandel	Israel	52.68	13	1	NR
45	Marcin Babuchowski	Poland	52.75	14	8	
46	Vytautas Janušaitis	Lithuania	52.76	11	5	
47	Stefanos Dimitriadis	Greece	52.89	13	3	
48	Pavels Kondrahins	Latvia	52.92	10	4	
48	Evgeny Lazuka	Belarus	52.92	12	7	
50	Diogo Carvalho	Portugal	52.94	14	6	
51	Simão Morgado	Portugal	52.98	13	4	
52	Jan Šefl	Czech Republic	52.99	13	7	
53	Darian Townsend	South Africa	53.04	16	0	
54	Marcin Tarczyński	Poland	53.06	14	1	
55	Shaune Fraser	Cayman Islands	53.07	11	2	
56	Octavio Alesi	Venezuela	53.12	12	1	
56	François Heersbrandt	Belgium	53.12	14	0	
58	Emil Dall-Nielsen	Denmark	53.20	13	6	
58	Rimvydas Salcius	Lithuania	53.20	13	2	
60	Gustavo Daniel Paschetta	Argentina	53.30	11	7	
61	Daniel Bego	Malaysia	53.33	11	1	
62	Andrejs Dūda	Latvia	53.41	12	0	
63	Elvis Burrows	Bahamas	53.51	11	9	NR
64	Alexandru Felix Maestru	Romania	53.61	11	3	
65	Damien Courtois	Switzerland	53.91	10	3	
66	Bernhard Wolf	Austria	53.98	11	4	
67	Rustam Khudiyev	Kazakhstan	54.01	10	6	
67	Alexandre Bakhtiarov	Cyprus	54.01	10	1	
69	Mathieu Fonteyn	Belgium	54.02	12	9	
70	Emmanuel Crescimbeni	Peru	54.08	8	3	NR
71	Nadav Kochavi	Israel	54.20	9	4	
72	Hsu Chi-Chieh	Chinese Taipei	54.34	10	7	
73	Stanislav Kuzmin	Kazakhstan	54.41	10	0	
74	Romāns Miloslavskis	Latvia	54.42	8	9	
75	Israel Duran	Mexico	54.52	10	8	
76	Serkan Atasay	Turkey	54.66	10	2	
77	Sten Indrikson	Estonia	54.73	9	3	
78	Martin Liivamägi	Estonia	54.74	9	6	
79	Yu Jeongnam	South Korea	54.78	10	5	
80	Tan Xue Wei Nicholas	Singapore	54.84	9	8	
81	Grant Beahan	Zimbabwe	54.89	8	4	NR
82	Goksu Bicer	Turkey	54.93	9	5	
83	Bader Almuhana	Saudi Arabia	55.11	9	2	NR
84	Andres Jose Gonzalez	Argentina	55.23	10	9	
85	Virdhawal Khade	India	55.28	11	6	
86	Rehan Poncha	India	55.29	7	3	
87	Nguyen Vo Thai	Vietnam	55.37	7	5	
88	Branden Whitehurst	(United States Virgin Islands) Virgin Islands	55.46	5	1	NR
89	Sergey Pankov	Uzbekistan	55.48	8	6	
90	Carlos Viveros Madariaga	Colombia	55.55	9	1	
91	Norbert Trudman	Slovakia	55.90	11	0	
92	Glenn Victor Sutanto	Indonesia	55.92	11	8	
93	Favio Persano	Paraguay	55.93	8	2	
94	Taki Mrabet	Tunisia	55.94	9	7	
95	Hajder Ensar	Bosnia and Herzegovina	56.17	7	2	
96	James Walsh	Philippines	56.38	6	4	
97	Conor Leaney	Ireland	56.39	9	9	
98	Brad Hamilton	Jamaica	56.56	6	0	NR
99	Endi Babi	Albania	56.58	5	5	
100	Wong Wing Cheung Victor	Macau	56.65	9	0	
101	Phillipe Mailliard Rodriguez	Chile	56.68	6	3	
102	Bruno Miguel Esquen Blas	Peru	56.80	8	8	
103	Emin Noshadi	Iran	56.84	6	1	
104	Pedro Pinotes	Angola	56.92	5	0	
105	Obaid Al-Jasmi	United Arab Emirates	56.96	7	7	
105	Joao Matias	Angola	56.96	7	0	
107	Alexander Ray	Namibia	56.97	4	5	
108	Teymur Guliyev	Azerbaijan	57.06	8	7	
109	Sim Ri Jin Nicholas	Singapore	57.10	7	6	
110	Serghei Golban	Moldova	57.14	5	2	
111	Roy Felipe Barahona Fuentes	Honduras	57.15	7	4	
112	Radhames Kalaf	Dominican Republic	57.33	5	7	
113	Yellow Yeiyah	Nigeria	57.37	4	3	
114	Javier Hernandez Maradiaga	Honduras	57.41	8	5	
115	Marcelino Richaards	Suriname	57.44	6	2	
116	Miguel Navarro	Bolivia	57.48	5	8	
117	Fernando Castellanos	Guatemala	57.75	5	9	
118	Nather Ahmed Alhamoud	Saudi Arabia	57.82	6	6	
119	Joel Romeu Lemarchand	Uruguay	57.97	7	9	
120	Kareem Ennab	Jordan	57.99	4	6	
121	Serghei Falcas	Moldova	58.12	5	6	
122	Byron Briedenhann	Namibia	58.28	4	2	
123	Luke Hall	Eswatini	58.55	5	4	
124	Ryan Nelthropp	United States Virgin Islands	58.65	4	7	
125	Aleksei Klimenko	Kyrgyzstan	58.69	8	1	
126	Alejandro Madde Madde	Bolivia	58.72	4	1	
127	Abbas Raad	Lebanon	58.77	6	9	
128	Ali Al Kaabi	United Arab Emirates	58.81	4	4	
129	Pietro Camilloni	San Marino	58.99	5	3	
130	Nasir Ali	Pakistan	59.12	4	9	
131	Chong Cheok Kuan	Macau	59.22	6	8	
132	Rashid Iunusov	Kyrgyzstan	59.40	7	1	
133	Timothy Ferris	Zimbabwe	59.49	6	7	
134	Andrey Molchanov	Turkmenistan	59.68	2	7	
135	Fernando Medrano	Nicaragua	59.80	3	4	
136	Neil Agius	Malta	59.86	3	6	
137	Jon Pepaj	Albania	1:00.05	7	8	
138	Niall Christopher Roberts	Guyana	1:00.53	4	8	
139	Heimanu Sichan	French Polynesia	1:00.55	3	3	
140	Colin Bensadon	Gibraltar	1:00.56	3	7	
141	Jean Marie Emmanuel Froge	Mauritius	1:00.86	3	8	
142	Benjamin Gabbard	American Samoa	1:00.87	3	9	
143	Moh'D Aqelah	Jordan	1:00.97	4	0	
144	Papa Madiop Ndong	Senegal	1:01.03	3	2	
145	Paul Elaisa	Fiji	1:02.40	2	1	
146	Gerusio Matonse	Mozambique	1:03.36	3	0	
147	Anthony Clark	French Polynesia	1:03.37	2	6	
148	Milimo Mweetwa	Zambia	1:03.86	2	2	
149	Jean Hugues Gregoire	Mauritius	1:03.89	2	5	
150	Peter Popahun Pokawin	Papua New Guinea	1:04.62	2	8	
151	Narantsog Tsogjargal	Mongolia	1:05.01	2	4	
152	Sergey Pevnev	Armenia	1:05.15	3	1	
153	Ali Mohamed Raaidh	Maldives	1:10.10	2	9	
154	Mohamed Mujahid	Maldives	1:10.32	1	4	
155	Johnny Rivera	Guam	1:10.49	1	5	
156	Ingabire-Ahishakiye Gael	Burundi	1:19.25	2	0	
–	Duje Draganja	Croatia	DNS	1	3	
–	Achelhi Bilal	Morocco	DNS	3	5	
–	Rami Anis	Syria	DNS	6	5	
–	Édgar Crespo	Panama	DNS	8	0	
–	Omar Pinzón	Colombia	DNS	12	5	
–	Stefan Hirniak	Canada	DNS	12	6	
–	Jean-Luc Augier	Saint Lucia	DSQ	2	3	

=== Semifinals ===
Rank	Name	Nationality	Time	Heat	Lane	Notes
1	Milorad Čavić	Serbia	50.01	2	4	WR
2	Michael Phelps	United States	50.48	1	4	
3	Rafael Muñoz	Spain	50.59	1	2	
4	Albert Subirats	Venezuela	50.65	2	3	SA
5	Jason Dunford	Kenya	50.78	1	8	AF
6	Gabriel Mangabeira	Brazil	51.02	1	3	NR
7	Andrew Lauterstein	Australia	51.03	1	5	
8	Tyler McGill	United States	51.07	2	5	
9	Yevgeny Korotyshkin	Russia	51.26	1	7	NR
10	Benjamin Starke	Germany	51.31	1	6	
11	Takuro Fujii	Japan	51.32	2	2	
11	Ivan Lenđer	Serbia	51.32	2	6	
13	Michael Rock	Great Britain	51.41	1	1	NR
14	Nikolay Skvortsov	Russia	51.50	2	1	
15	Peter Mankoč	Slovenia	51.54	2	7	
16	Corney Swanepoel	New Zealand	51.79	2	8	

=== Final ===
Rank	Lane	Name	Nationality	Time	Notes
1st place, gold medalist(s)	5	Michael Phelps	United States	49.82	WR
2nd place, silver medalist(s)	4	Milorad Čavić	Serbia	49.95	ER
3rd place, bronze medalist(s)	3	Rafael Muñoz	Spain	50.41	NR
4	6	Albert Subirats	Venezuela	50.79	
5	1	Andrew Lauterstein	Australia	50.85	OC
6	2	Jason Dunford	Kenya	51.07	
7	8	Tyler McGill	United States	51.42	
8	7	Gabriel Mangabeira	Brazil	51.74	
