= 2014 FINA World Swimming Championships (25 m) – Men's 4 × 100 metre freestyle relay =

Men's 4 × 100 metre freestyle relay at the 2014 FINA World Swimming Championships (25 m)
- Dates: 3 December
- Competitors: 80 from 20 nations
- Winning time: 3:03.78

Medalists
gold medal	Clément Mignon; Fabien Gilot; Florent Manaudou; Mehdy Metella	France
silver medal	Vladimir Morozov; Sergey Fesikov; Danila Izotov; Mikhail Polischuk; Oleg Tikhobaev; Nikita Konovalov	Russia
bronze medal	Jimmy Feigen; Matt Grevers; Ryan Lochte; Tom Shields; Darian Townsend	United States

The Men's 4 × 100 metre freestyle relay competition of the 2014 FINA World Swimming Championships (25 m) was held on 3 December.

== Records ==
Prior to the competition, the existing world and championship records were as follows.

	Nation	Time	Location	Date
World record	United States	3:03.30	Manchester	19 December 2009
Championship record	France	3:04.78	Dubai	15 December 2010

The following records were established during the competition:

Date	Event	Nation	Time	Record
3 December	Final	France	3:03.78	CR

== Results ==
=== Heats ===
The heats were held at 12:36.

Rank	Heat	Lane	Nation	Swimmers	Time	Notes
1	3	6	Italy	Luca Dotto (47.32); Luca Leonardi (46.98); Marco Belotti (47.35); Marco Orsi (46.00)	3:07.65	Q
2	3	8	Brazil	Henrique Martins (48.06); César Cielo (45.53); Alan Vitória (46.78); Henrique Rodrigues (47.47)	3:07.84	Q
3	2	7	France	Clément Mignon (46.99); Fabien Gilot (46.80); Florent Manaudou (46.74); Mehdy Metella (47.41)	3:07.94	Q
4	2	5	United States	Darian Townsend (47.83); Matt Grevers (46.57); Tom Shields (46.67); Jimmy Feigen (46.98)	3:08.05	Q
5	3	0	Russia	Sergey Fesikov (46.67); Oleg Tikhobaev (47.23); Nikita Konovalov (47.28); Mikhail Polischuk (46.97)	3:08.15	Q
6	2	0	Australia	Matthew Abood (47.27); Travis Mahoney (47.19); Daniel Smith (47.21); Tommaso D'Orsogna (46.61)	3:08.28	Q
7	2	4	Japan	Katsumi Nakamura (47.25); Shinri Shioura (47.06); Kosuke Hagino (47.39); Yuki Kawachi (47.41)	3:09.11	Q
8	3	7	Belgium	Jasper Aerents (47.69); Emmanuel Vanluchene (46.90); Glenn Surgeloose (47.30); François Heersbrandt (47.54)	3:09.43	Q
9	2	8	Germany	Marco di Carli (47.81); Markus Deibler (46.86); Philip Heintz (47.90); Steffen Deibler (47.32)	3:09.89	
10	3	3	China	Jiang Yuhui (50.08); Ning Zetao (46.13); Lin Yongqing (47.91); Yu Hexin (47.97)	3:12.09	
11	2	6	South Africa	Leith Shankland (48.05); Clayton Jimmie (47.89); Calvyn Justus (48.32); Myles Brown (48.61)	3:12.87	
12	3	5	Argentina	Matías Aguilera (48.78); Guido Buscaglia (49.75); Joaquín Belza (49.03); Federico Grabich (47.35)	3:14.91	
13	3	1	Uzbekistan	Daniil Tulupov (50.59); Islam Aslanov (50.26); Alexsey Derlyugov (48.45); Khurshidjon Tursunov (48.61)	3:17.91	
14	3	2	Algeria	Sahnoune Oussama (48.44); Nazim Belkhodja (48.29); Jugurtha Boumali (50.78); Lies Nefsi (50.71)	3:18.22	
15	1	3	Paraguay	Charles Hockin (49.39); Matías López (51.48); Max Abreu (50.78); Ben Hockin (47.48)	3:19.13	
16	1	4	Iceland	Kristofer Sigurðsson (51.21); Kristinn Þórarinsson (50.11); Kolbeinn Hrafnkelsson (51.48); Davíð Hildiberg Aðalsteinsson (49.68)	3:22.48	
17	3	4	Philippines	Axel Toni Steven Ngui (51.57); Jethro Roberts Chua (50.99); Fahad Alkhaldi (52.19); Jessie Lacuna (51.01)	3:25.76	
18	2	2	Hong Kong	Mak Ho Lun Raymond (50.55); Ng Chun Nam Derick (51.61); Lau Shiu Yue (52.20); Ng Kai Hong Henry (53.40)	3:27.76	
19	2	1	Macau	Chao Man Hou (51.25); Wang Pok Iao (53.81); Yum Cheng Man (54.60); Sio Ka Kun (53.63)	3:33.29	
20	2	9	Papua New Guinea	Livingston Aika (56.11); Ryan Pini (49.68); Bobby Akunaii (56.85); Stanford Kawale (53.13)	3:35.77	
—	1	5	Albania		DNS	
—	2	3	Seychelles		DNS	

=== Final ===
The final was held at 19:17.

Rank	Lane	Nation	Swimmers	Time	Notes
1st place, gold medalist(s)	3	France	Clément Mignon (47.05); Fabien Gilot (46.13); Florent Manaudou (44.80); Mehdy Metella (45.80)	3:03.78	CR, ER
2nd place, silver medalist(s)	2	Russia	Vladimir Morozov (45.51 CR); Sergey Fesikov (46.01); Danila Izotov (45.79); Mikhail Polischuk (46.87)	3:04.18	
3rd place, bronze medalist(s)	6	United States	Jimmy Feigen (47.41); Matt Grevers (46.13); Ryan Lochte (46.02); Tom Shields (46.02)	3:05.58	
4	4	Italy	Luca Dotto (47.17); Marco Orsi (45.39); Luca Leonardi (46.87); Filippo Magnini (46.36)	3:05.79	
5	7	Australia	Cameron McEvoy (46.56); Matthew Abood (46.78); Travis Mahoney (47.49); Tommaso D'Orsogna (45.65)	3:06.48	
6	8	Belgium	Jasper Aerents (47.59); Pieter Timmers (46.08); Emmanuel Vanluchene (46.60); Glenn Surgeloose (47.27)	3:07.54	
7	1	Japan	Katsumi Nakamura (47.05); Shinri Shioura (46.39); Reo Sakata (47.12); Kosuke Hagino (47.23)	3:07.79	AS
8	5	Brazil	Henrique Martins (47.74); João de Lucca (45.65); Alan Vitória (47.60); Gustavo Godoy (47.32)	3:08.31	
