= Plivački klub Partizan =

Serbian swimming club

Plivački Klub Partizan
- Founded: 1945
- Colors
- Manager: Matije Koprivica

PK Partizan or Plivački Klub Partizan is a swimming club from Belgrade, Serbia. The club is part of the sports society JSD Partizan. It was founded in 1945 and is a member of the Serbian Swimming Association.

The club participates in various tournaments.

== Notable Affiliates ==
- Olympic Medalist Milorad Čavić
- Two-time junior European champion Velimir Stjepanović
