= Milorad Čavić =

Serbian swimmer (born 1984)

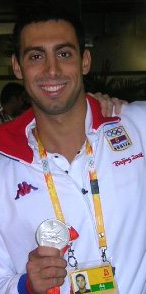
- Čavić at the 2008 Beijing Olympics

Personal information
- Nicknames: Čavke, Čava, Majkula, Mike, Milo
- National team: FR Yugoslavia (2000–03); Serbia and Montenegro (2003–06); Serbia (2006–12)
- Born: May 31, 1984 (age 42) Anaheim, California, U.S.
- Height: 1.97 m (6 ft 5 1/2 in)
- Weight: 93 kg (205 lb)
- Website: www.swimwithmilo.com

Sport
- Sport: Swimming
- Strokes: Butterfly, freestyle
- Club: JSD Partizan
- College team: University of California, Berkeley
Medal record
Olympic Games
Silver medal – second place	2008 Beijing	100 m butterfly
World Championships (LC)
Gold medal – first place	2009 Rome	50 m butterfly
Silver medal – second place	2009 Rome	100 m butterfly
European Championships (LC)
Gold medal – first place	2008 Eindhoven	50 m butterfly
Gold medal – first place	2012 Debrecen	100 m butterfly
European Championships (SC)
Gold medal – first place	2003 Dublin	100 m butterfly
Gold medal – first place	2006 Helsinki	100 m butterfly
Gold medal – first place	2007 Debrecen	50 m butterfly
Gold medal – first place	2007 Debrecen	100 m butterfly
Gold medal – first place	2008 Rijeka	100 m butterfly
Silver medal – second place	2003 Dublin	50 m freestyle
Silver medal – second place	2006 Helsinki	50 m freestyle
Silver medal – second place	2008 Rijeka	50 m butterfly

Milorad "Milo" Čavić (Serbian Cyrillic: Милорад "Мило" Чавић, Serbian pronunciation: [mîloraːd tʃǎːʋitɕ]; born May 31, 1984) is a Serbian former professional swimmer. He won a silver medal in the 100-meter butterfly at the 2008 Summer Olympics in a historic race with American swimmer Michael Phelps. Čavić also was World and European champion, as well as world record holder. He is one of seven swimmers to break 50 seconds in the 100m butterfly.

== Swimming career ==
Born in Anaheim, California and a citizen of both Serbia and the United States, he attended Tustin High School in Tustin, California, where he set four CIF records and a national high school mark in the 50 yd freestyle. While swimming for the University of California, Berkeley and training with Mike Bottom, Čavić set a new school and Pac-10 record in the 100 yd butterfly (45.44 s).

Representing Serbia and Montenegro at the European Short Course Swimming Championships in Dublin 2003, Čavić won the gold medal in 100 m butterfly and set a new world record in the short course. He also won a silver medal in 50 m freestyle. Čavić defended his European 100 m title on subsequent short-course championships in Helsinki 2006 (finishing 50.63), Debrecen 2007 (finishing at 50.53) and Rijeka 2008 (finishing at 49.19 and setting a new European record). He also took silver on 50 m butterfly in Rijeka.

On December 14, 2006, Čavić defended his European championship in the 100 m butterfly in Helsinki, finishing at 50.63 seconds. On December 14, 2007, the sprinter defended his European championship again in the 100 m butterfly in Debrecen, finishing at 50.53 seconds.

In 2008, Čavić won the European championship in the 50 m butterfly, setting the new European record (23.11) in Eindhoven, Holland – a result briefly quashed when the European Swimming Federation (LEN) immediately disqualified the swimmer for wearing a T-shirt at the medals ceremony that read "Kosovo is Serbia". However, his disqualification was removed and his record was recognized.

At the end of the year, he was declared the best Serbian athlete.

At the 2009 World Aquatics Championships, Čavić won gold in the 50 m butterfly and broke the 100 m butterfly world record in the semifinals finishing in 50.01 seconds. In the finals Čavić won silver with time of 49.95. In that final, Both Cavic and winner Phelps became the first two swimmers to swim the 100 fly under 50 seconds.

He missed competitions in 2010 due to spinal surgery.

The Olympic Committee of Serbia proclaimed him sportsman of the year three times, in 2003, 2008 and 2009.

On May 26, 2012, he won the gold medal at the 2012 European Aquatics Championships in Debrecen, Hungary, in the 100 m butterfly, setting the best time in the world in 2012 and a new championship record: 51.45 seconds.

== Olympic career ==
=== 2000 Sydney Summer Olympics ===
At the age of 16, Čavić represented Yugoslavia at the 2000 Summer Olympics in Sydney, Australia in the 100 m butterfly (disqualified) and 100 backstroke – 42nd – 58.25 s.

Event	Results	Time
100 m butterfly	DSQ	
100 m backstroke	42nd	58.25

=== 2004 Athens Summer Olympics ===
Čavić represented Serbia and Montenegro at the 2004 Summer Olympics in Athens, Greece in the 100 m butterfly, 50 m freestyle and the 100 m freestyle.

Event	Results	Time
100 m butterfly	Semifinal ranking – 16th	53.12
50 m freestyle	Heats ranking – 31st	23.05
100 m freestyle	Heats ranking – 19th	49.74

Čavić was leading in a semifinal of the 100 metre butterfly, but right after the turn at the halfway point of the race, his suit opened at the neck and sucked in water, causing Čavić to finish last. In the heats of the 100 metre freestyle, Čavić finished 19th missing the semi-finals by 0.02 seconds.

Čavić trained at The Race Club, a swimming club founded by Olympic swimmers Gary Hall, Jr. and his father, Gary Hall, Sr. The Race Club, originally known as "The World Team," was designed to serve as a training group for elite swimmers across the world in preparation for the 2000 Sydney Olympics. To be able to train with the Race Club, one must either have been ranked in the top 20 in the world the past 3 calendar years or top 3 in their nation in the past year. The Race Club included such well known swimmers as Roland Mark Schoeman, Mark Foster, Ryk Neethling, Ricky Busquet and Therese Alshammar. The Race Club offers various swimming camps, swim clinics, and swimming technique video recording year round for young swimmers at their Islamorada, Florida based training center.

=== 2008 Beijing Summer Olympics ===
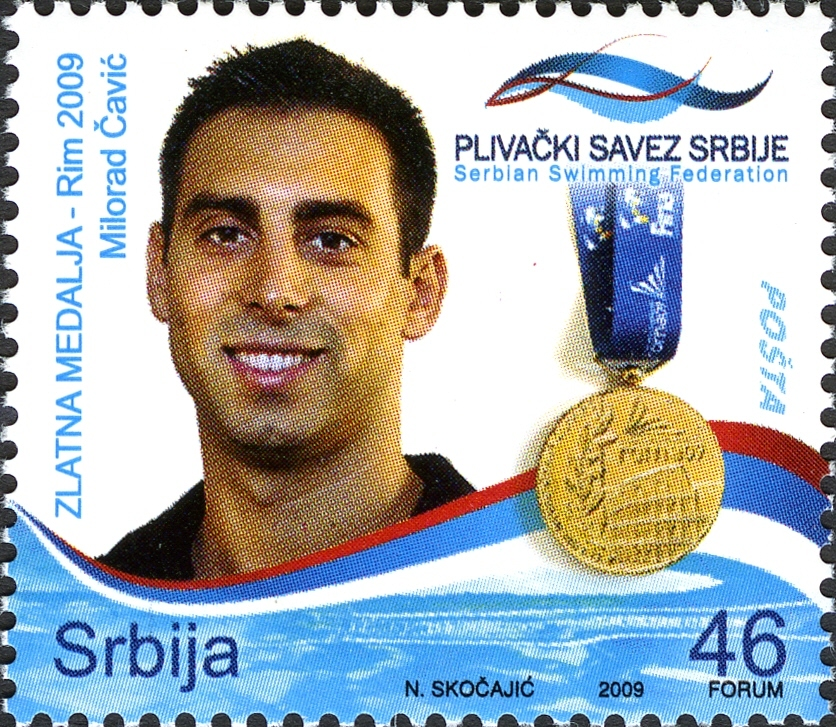
Čavić on a 2009 Serbian stamp

Čavić represented Serbia at the 2008 Summer Olympics in Beijing, People's Republic of China in two swimming events. Even though he qualified for the 100 metre freestyle semi-final Čavić withdrew in order to prepare for the 100 metre butterfly.

On August 14, 2008 at the Beijing Olympics, Čavić broke the 100 meter butterfly Olympic Record during the preliminary heats, finishing ahead of Michael Phelps and also recorded the fastest time in the semi-finals. Čavić came in second to Phelps by one hundredth of a second in the final, and became Serbia's inaugural Olympiad medalist. It was Phelps' seventh gold medal of the Olympiad. The Serbian team initially challenged the result but FINA later confirmed the finish. It was later confirmed by the FINA and Omega timekeeping officials that Čavić indeed arrived first but it was Phelps who, in the milliseconds after touching the wall, applied more force to trigger an electronic touchpad first. Čavić later wrote in his blog: "People, this is the greatest moment of my life. If you ask me, it should be accepted and we should move on. I’ve accepted defeat, and there’s nothing wrong with losing to the greatest swimmer there has ever been".

Čavić continued training at The Race Club.

=== 2012 London Summer Olympics ===
Čavić represented Serbia at the 2012 Summer Olympics in London, England, making it his sporting finale. He qualified for the 100 meter butterfly final and tied for fourth place.

== Career best times ==
=== Long course metres (50 m pool) ===
Event	Time		Meet	Location	Date	Notes
50 m freestyle	22.29		2008 Missouri Grand Prix	Columbia, Missouri, United States	February 16, 2008	Former NR
100 m freestyle	48.15	h	2008 Summer Olympics	Beijing, China	August 12, 2008	Former NR
50 m butterfly	22.67		2009 World Championships	Rome, Italy	July 27, 2009	NR
100 m butterfly	49.95		2009 World Championships	Rome, Italy	August 1, 2009	NR, Former ER

Legend: ER – European record; NR – Serbian record; e – equalled existing record;
Records not set in finals: h – heat; sf – semifinal; r – relay 1st leg; rh – relay heat 1st leg; b – B final; † – en route to final mark; so – swim-off; tt – time trial

=== Short course metres (25 m pool) ===
Event	Time	Meet	Location	Date	Notes
50 m freestyle	21.49	2003 European Short Course Championships	Dublin, Ireland	December 11, 2003	NR
100 m freestyle	47.90	2007 Italian Grand Prix	Genoa, Italy	November 23, 2007	Former NR
50 m butterfly	22.36	2008 European Short Course Championships	Rijeka, Croatia	December 14, 2008	NR
100 m butterfly	49.19	2008 European Short Course Championships	Rijeka, Croatia	December 12, 2008	NR, Former ER

Legend: ER – European record; NR – Serbian record; e – equalled existing record;
Records not set in finals: h – heat; sf – semifinal; r – relay 1st leg; rh – relay heat 1st leg; b – B final; † – en route to final mark; so – swim-off; tt – time trial

== Honours and awards ==
- OCS Sportsman of the Year Award (3): 2003, 2008, 2009
- Golden Badge of DSL Sport (1): 2008

== See also ==
- List of swimmers
- List of Olympic medalists in swimming (men)
- List of World Aquatics Championships medalists in swimming (men)
- List of European Aquatics Championships medalists in swimming (men)
- List of European Short Course Swimming Championships medalists (men)
- List of European records in swimming
- List of European Championships records in swimming
- List of Serbian records in swimming
- The Race Club

Awards
Preceded by Novak Djokovic	The Best Athlete of Serbia; 2008	Succeeded by Nađa Higl
Records
Preceded by Michael Phelps	Men's 100 metre butterfly world record holder (long course); July 31, 2009 – August 1, 2009	Succeeded by Michael Phelps
Preceded by Rafael Muñoz Pérez	Men's 100 metre butterfly European record holder (long course); July 31, 2009 –	Succeeded by Incumbent
Preceded by Yevgeny Korotyshkin	Men's 100 metre butterfly European record holder (short course); December 12, 2008 – November 15, 2009	Succeeded by Yevgeny Korotyshkin
Preceded by Thomas Rupprath	Men's 100 metre butterfly world record holder (short course); December 12, 2003 – March 26, 2004	Succeeded by Ian Crocker
Preceded by Sergiy Breus	Men's 50 metre butterfly European record holder (long course); March 19, 2008 – April 5, 2009	Succeeded by Rafael Muñoz Pérez
