= Alon Mandel =

Israeli swimmer

Personal information
- Native name: אלון מנדל
- Full name: Alon Mandel
- Nationality: Israeli
- Born: August 23, 1988 (age 37) Columbus, Ohio, U.S.

Sport
- Sport: Swimming
- Club: Maccabi Kiryat Bialik
- College team: University of Michigan
Medal record
Maccabiah Games
Gold medal – first place	2009 Israel	100m butterfly

Alon Mandel (Hebrew: אלון מנדל; born 23 August 1988) is an Israeli swimmer who represented Israel at the 2008 Summer Olympics. Mandel is the national record holder (2014) in 50- and 100-meter butterfly. Mandel won the 100-meter butterfly at the 2009 Maccabiah Games and still holds the record in that event.

== Biography ==
Mandel was born in the United States and was raised in Netanya, Israel. He has a bachelor's degree in chemical engineering from the University of Michigan, a master's degree in environmental engineering from Tel Aviv University, and another master's degree in political science from Tel Aviv University as well.

Mandel started swimming at age 6 and began training at the club Hapoel Emek Hefer. Initially he raced in backstroke, and set records for youth in both the 50- and 100-meter backstroke. In 2006, at age 18, Alon was recognized as an athletic prodigy, and postponed his mandatory army service in order to study chemical engineering at the University of Michigan in parallel to training with the varsity men's swim team at the University of Michigan, along with Michael Phelps and his coach, Bob Bowman. During his training in Michigan, Alon switched his primary stroke from backstroke to butterfly, although he kept competing in backstroke for the University of Michigan. During his tenure at the University of Michigan, Mandel won four NCAA First-Team All-American accolades, three NCAA Honorable Mention All-American accolades, and five Big Ten Conference titles.

In Israel Mandel represented Maccabi Kiryat Bialik Club between 2008 and 2012 and Hapoel Dolphin Netanya between 2012 and 2013.

== Career ==
=== 2008 ===
At the 2008 European Aquatics Championships in Eindhoven, Netherlands, Mandel set a new national record in the 200 meter butterfly with a time of 1:59.79 minutes, becoming the first Israeli swimmer to finish this event in under two minutes. To ensure his participation at the 2008 Summer Olympics in Beijing, Mandel needed to finish among the first 12 swimmers. He finished 13th, just two hundredths of a second slower than 12th place. However, a couple of months later, it was discovered that the Greek swimmer who had won the 200 meter butterfly, Ioannis Drymonakos, had used banned substances and was therefore suspended. As a result, Mandel moved up to 12th place and the Olympic Committee of Israel confirmed his participation in the 2008 Olympics.

In July 2008, Mandel broke the Israeli national record in the 100 meter butterfly with a time of 53.61 seconds.

While in Beijing, just one day before the opening ceremony, Mandel was informed of the death of his father, who was killed in an accident at his home. After consulting with his family, Mandel decided to stay in China and participate in the competitions. In the 200 meter butterfly, which was held only four days later, Mandel broke the Israeli record, improving it to 1:59:27 minutes, finishing 28th. Three days later, Mandel set another Israeli record in the 100 meter butterfly – 52.99 seconds – becoming the only Israeli as of 2016 to swim the event in under 53 seconds. Mandel finished in 36th place, less than half a second slower than the time needed to advance to the semi-finals.

=== 2009 ===
At the 2009 Summer Universiade in Belgrade, Serbia, Mandel set a new Israeli record of 24.27 seconds in the 50 meter butterfly.

Mandel swam at the 2009 Maccabiah Games, held at the Wingate Institute in Netanya, Israel. He won the gold medal in the 100 meter butterfly, setting a new Maccabiah Games record of 52.99 seconds.

Mandel competed in the 2009 World Aquatics Championships in Rome, Italy. In that competition, he set a new Israeli record in both the 50 meter butterfly (23.90 seconds, 31st place) and the 100 meter butterfly (52.68 seconds, 44th place). In the 4×100 medley relay, he swam the butterfly time of 51.60 seconds, helping the team to finish in 17th place with a new Israeli record of 3:36:23 minutes, more than five seconds faster than Israel's previous record, set in 2007.

At the 2009 Israeli National Championships, Mandel remained outside the A-final in the 100 meter butterfly, after finishing the prelims in 9th place. However, at the B-final held that evening, he set a new Israeli and international record of 52.56 seconds.

=== 2010 ===
At the 2010 European Aquatics Championships in Budapest, Hungary, Mandel finished in 15th place in the 100 meter butterfly with a time of 53.19 seconds. He finished 17th in the 50 meter butterfly (23.98 seconds), 19th in the 50 meter backstroke (25.66 seconds), 33rd in the 200 meter freestyle (1:52:54 minutes), and 10th place in the 4×100 meter medley relay, alongside Jonatan Kopelev (backstroke), Danny Melnik (breastroke) and Guy Barnea (freestyle), with a time of 3:40:26 minutes.

At the 2010 FINA World Swimming Championships (25 m) in Dubai, UAE, Mandel set several Israeli national records. In the 50 meter butterfly, he set a record of 23.39 seconds, finishing 19th and missing the time needed to advance to the semi-final by 4 hundredths of a second. In the 100 meter butterfly, he set a record of 52.34 seconds and finished in 30th place. In the 200 meter butterfly, he set another Israeli record (1:56.67 minutes), which was broken only one heat later by Gal Nevo, who improved Mandel's time by 0.01 seconds. Mandel finished in 24th place in that event. In the 100 meter freestyle, he finished 33rd, setting a personal best of 49.02 seconds.

=== 2011 ===
At the 2011 European Short Course Swimming Championships in Szczecin, Poland, Mandel finished in 7th place in the 50 meter backstroke with a time of 23.96 seconds, only three hundredths of a second slower than Guy Barnea's Israeli record. In the 100 meter butterfly, Mandel set a new Israeli record of 52.12 seconds, finishing 12th. Mandel also was a member of two relays – the 4x50 freestyle and 4x50 medley – setting new Israeli records in both events.

At the 2011 Summer Universiade in Shenzhen, China, Mandel finished 8th in the 50 meter butterfly.

=== 2012 ===
At the 2012 European Aquatics Championships in Debrecen, Hungary, Mandel finished 15th in the 50 meter butterfly with a time of 24.05 seconds. In the 100 meter butterfly, he finished 22nd with a time of 53.57 seconds. Mandel also swam in the 4×100 meter medley relay team with Yakov Toumarkin, Imri Ganiel and Nimrod Shapira Bar-Or, finishing in 7th place with a time of 3:37.77 minutes, missing the Olympic criterion by less than a second.

Towards the end of his career, Mandel participated in the 2012 FINA World Swimming Championships (25 m) in Istanbul, Turkey, helping the Israeli team to finish 10th in the 4×100 medley relay with teammates Jonatan Kopelev (backstroke), Gal Nevo (breastroke), and Guy Barnea (freestyle), setting a new Israeli record of 3:32:43 minutes. Mandel swam the butterfly leg in 52.80 seconds.

=== 2013–present ===
On 22 July 2013, Mandel announced his retirement from competitive swimming.

In June 2013, Mandel was elected a board member of the Olympic Committee of Israel. He participates in the finance and sport committees, the latter of which assists Olympic athletes in their career transition after retirement from sports.

In June 2014, Mandel began working for Noble Energy as an environmental engineer.

== See also ==
- List of Israeli records in swimming
