= Bernhard Wolf =

Austrian artist

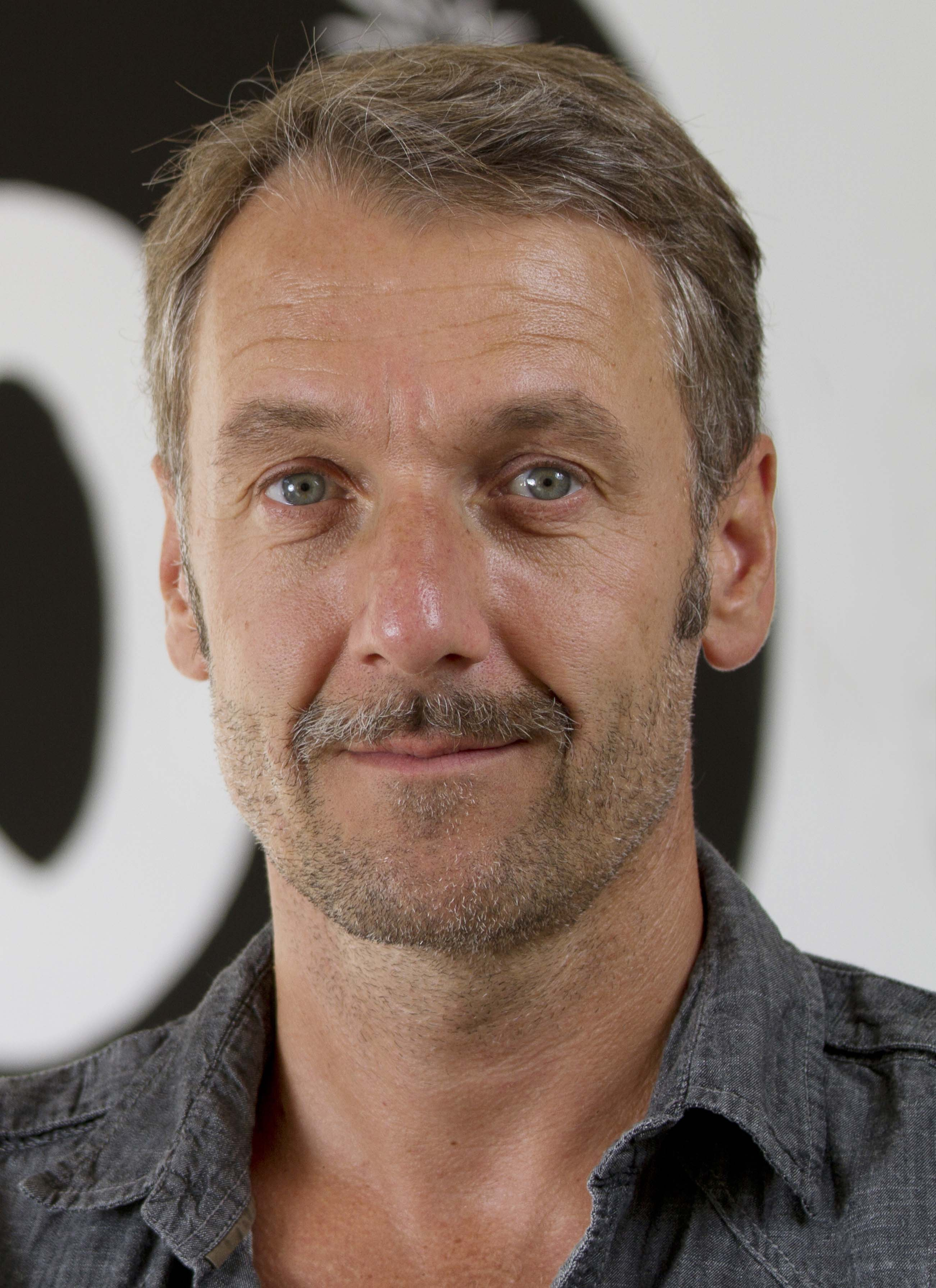
Bernhard Wolf

Bernhard Wolf (born 1965 in Klagenfurt, Carinthia) is a visual artist from Austria.

== Life and work ==
Wolf studied art at the Free Academy Moscow from 1992 – 1996 at the master class of Aleksander Petlura. Wolf is a member of the Free Academy Moscow, Forum Stadtpark Graz, FOND Graz and the Kunstverein Kärnten. From 2007 to 2010 he was director of the Forum Stadtpark Graz (together with Carola Peschl). He works in Graz and Vienna.

In his paintings Wolf works with logo-culture, contemporary visual communication and icons of pop-culture.

He furthermore has realized and realizes numerous interventions in public space, temporary and permanent ones, in Austria and other countries.

A significant aspect of Wolf's work are his art activities in Russia and Ukraine since 1992, having had group exhibitions with Aristarkh Chernyshev, Vladislav Efimov, Aleksander Petlura, Bronislava Dubner. Oleg Kulik, Artem Filatov, Vova Chernyshev a.o.

In 2003 Wolf organised together with Judith Schwentner and Herwig G. Höller a major show of contemporary art and music from Saint Petersburg / Russia within the framework of Graz being European Capital of Culture.

== Publications (selection) ==
- Public art. Volume 1 / publication series on the work of the Institute for Art in Public Space Styria since 2012 Released: 2015, German / English, Editors: Elisabeth Fiedler, Dirck Möllmann, ISBN 978-3-86984-546-3
- Texts: Elisabeth Fiedler, Dirck Möllmann, Markus Bogensberger, Reinhard Braun, Christian Egger, Krist Gruijthuijsen, Veronica Kaup-Hasler, Barbara Pichler
- Bernhard Wolf, works 1993 – 2013, Released: 2013, German/English, Editor: Forum Stadtpark Graz, ISBN 978-3-901109-38-6 With text contributions by Judith Laister, Herwig G. Höller and Peter Weibel.
- parallelinfo - direct news channel Russia/USA Editor: edition selene, Vienna, 2001, German, ISBN 3-85266-175-7.

== Projects (selection) ==
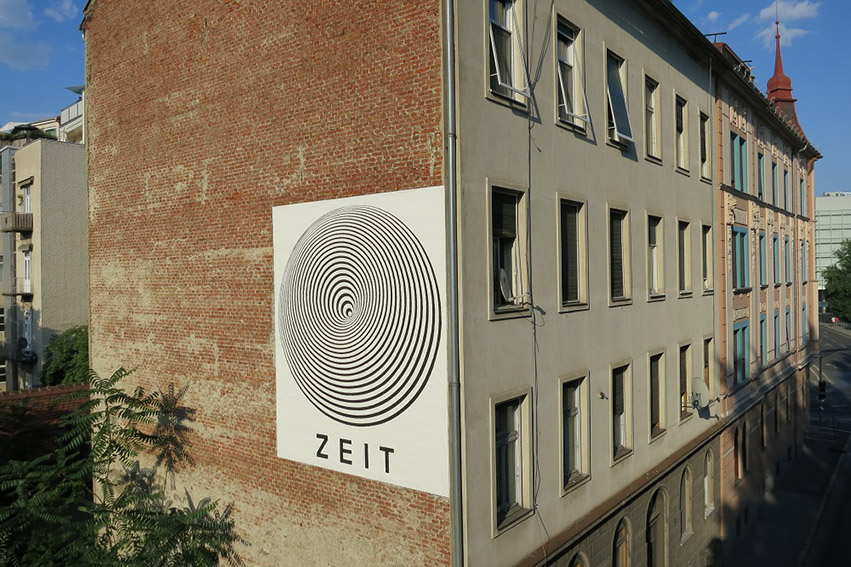

- If you don't give the mind something to do, the mind will give you something to do. Kunsthaus Graz, Austria 2015
- DIQIU / EARTH, public space interventions, group - exhibition: "Desiring the real. Austria contemporary", University Museum and Art Gallery, Hong Kong, China 2015
- GORA-ZIRKA/MOUNTAIN-STAR, Mala Galleria, Mystetskyi Arsenal, Kiew, Ukraine 2015
- EARTH / ZEMLYA, NCCA – National Center for Contemporary Art, Moscow / Nizhny Nowgorod, Russia 2014
- „fokus sammlung 04. Tiere“, Museum Moderner Kunst Kärnten, Klagenfurt, Austria 2013
