= David van der Colff =

Botswana swimmer (born 1997)

Personal information
- Nationality: Botswana
- Born: 29 April 1997 (age 29)

Sport
- Sport: Swimming

David van der Colff (born 29 April 1997) is a Botswana swimmer. He competed in the men's 100 metre backstroke event at the 2016 Summer Olympics, where he ranked 35th with a time of 57.77 seconds. He did not advance to the semi-final.
