= Anthonny Sitraka Ralefy =

Malagasy swimmer

Personal information
- Born: July 10, 1995 (age 30)

Sport
- Sport: Swimming
- Strokes: Butterfly

Anthonny Sitraka Ralefy (born July 10, 1995) is a Malagasy swimmer. He competed at the 2016 Summer Olympics in the men's 100 metre butterfly event; his time of 54.72 seconds in the heats did not qualify him for the semifinals.
