= Matteo Rivolta =

Italian swimmer (born 1991)

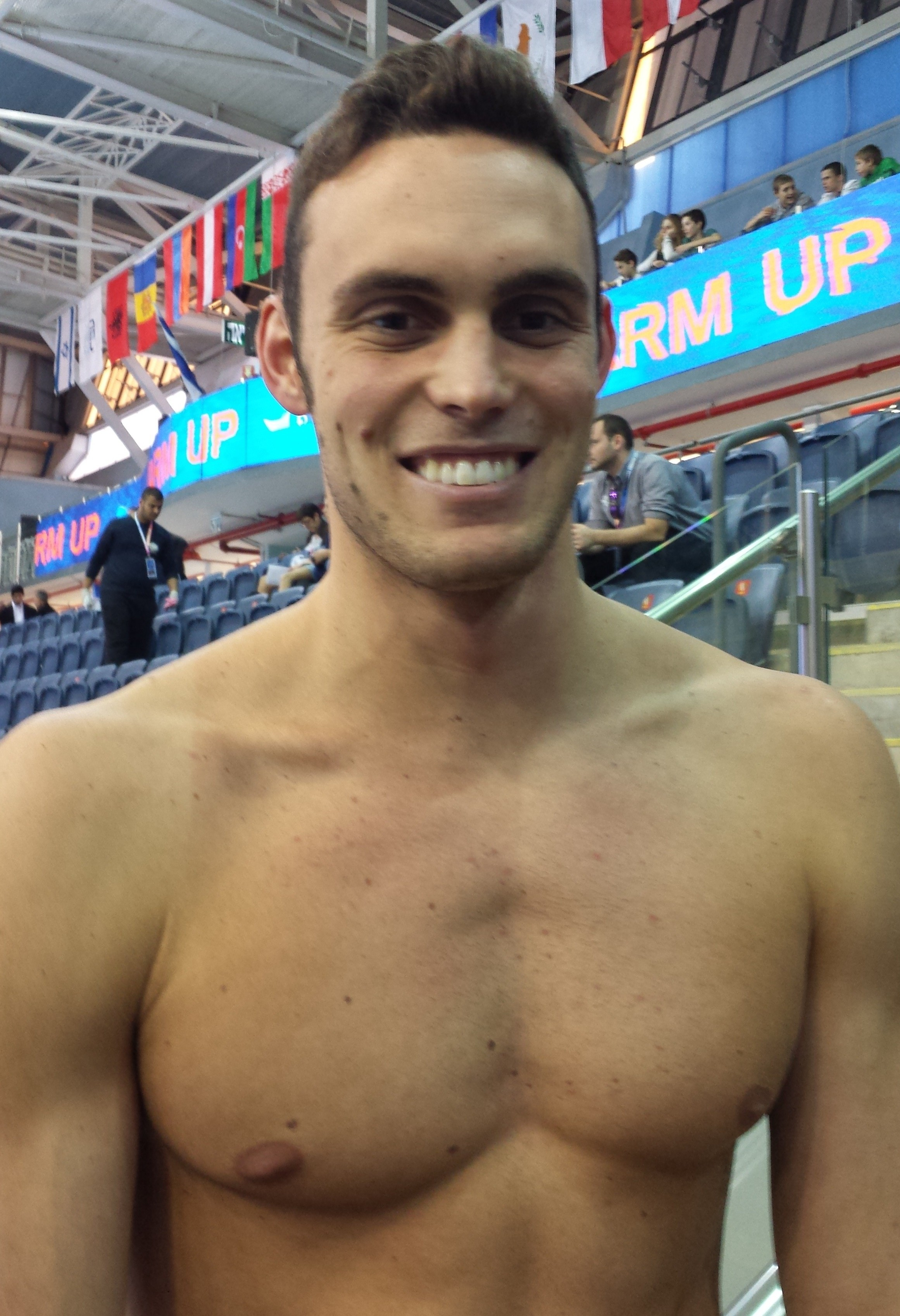

Personal information
- Born: 16 November 1991 (age 34) Milan, Italy
- Height: 1.94 m (6 ft 4 in)
- Weight: 94 kg (207 lb)

Sport
- Sport: Swimming
- Strokes: Butterfly
- Club: Team Insubrika
- Coach: Gianni Leoni
Medal record
World Championships (SC)
Gold medal – first place	2021 Abu Dhabi	100 m butterfly
Gold medal – first place	2021 Abu Dhabi	4×100 m medley
Gold medal – first place	2022 Melbourne	4×50 m medley
Bronze medal – third place	2021 Abu Dhabi	50 m butterfly
Bronze medal – third place	2021 Abu Dhabi	4×50 m medley
Bronze medal – third place	2022 Melbourne	4×100 m medley
European Championships (LC)
Gold medal – first place	2022 Roma	4×100 m medley
Gold medal – first place	2012 Debrecen	4x100 m medley
Bronze medal – third place	2012 Debrecen	100 m butterfly
European Championships (SC)
Gold medal – first place	2015 Netanya	4×50 m medley
Gold medal – first place	2017 Copenhagen	100 m butterfly
Silver medal – second place	2015 Netanya	100 m butterfly
Mediterranean Games
Gold medal – first place	2022 Oran	4×100 m medley
Gold medal – first place	2022 Oran	100 m butterfly
Silver medal – second place	2013 Mersin	100 m butterfly
Silver medal – second place	2018 Tarragona	100 m butterfly
Silver medal – second place	2022 Oran	50 m butterfly

Matteo Rivolta (born 16 November 1991) is a male Italian former swimmer. He won bronze medal in 100 metres butterfly at the 2012 European Aquatics Championships.

Rivolta an athlete of the Gruppo Sportivo Fiamme Oro.

He competed at the 2012 and 2016 Olympics. At the 2012 Summer Olympics, he finished 22nd in the 100 m butterfly and was part of the Italian team that finished in 14th in the men's 4 × 100 m medley relay. At the 2016 Olympics, he finished in 25th in the 100 m butterfly.

At the 2012 European Championships, he was part of the Italian team that won gold in the men's 4 × 100 m medley relay, and won bronze in the men's 100 m butterfly.

At the 2015 European Short Course Championships, he was part of the Italian team that won gold in the men's 4 × 100 m medley relay, and won silver in the men's 100 m butterfly. At the 2017 European Short Course Championship, he won the men's 100 m butterfly.

In 2021, he won the gold in the 100 m butterfly and bronze in the 50 m butterfly at the Short Course World Championship, setting a new Italian record. As of December 2022, he also holds the Italian short course record in the 100 m butterfly. He was part of the Italian team that won gold in the men's 4 × 100 m relay in a new championship record of 3:19.76 (with Lorenzo Mora, Nicolo Martinenghi and Alessandro Miressi) and bronze in the men's 4 x 50 m medley relay (with Mora, Martinenghi and Lorenzo Zazzeri). At the 2021 European Short Course championships he won silver in the men's 50 m butterfly and the men's 4 x 50 m medley relay.

At the 2022 Short Course World Championships, he was part of the Italian 4 x 50 m medley relay team that won the gold medal in a new world record time of 1:29.72 (with Mora, Martinenghi and Leonardo Deplano). At that championships, he was also part of the Italian team that won bronze in the 4 × 100 m medley relay, with a new European record time (with Mora, Martinenghi and Miressi). He was also part of the Italian 4 × 100 m medley relay team that won gold at the European Long Course Championships.

== Achievements ==
Year	Competition	Venue	Position	Event	Performance	Notes
2012	European Championships (LC)	(Hungary) Debrecen	3rd	100 m butterfly	52"40	
2012	European Championships (LC)	(Hungary) Debrecen	1st	4 × 100 m medley	3'32"80	
2022	European Championships (LC)	(Italy) Roma	1st	4 × 100 m medley	3'28"46	
