= Yauhen Tsurkin =

Belarusian swimmer (born 1990)

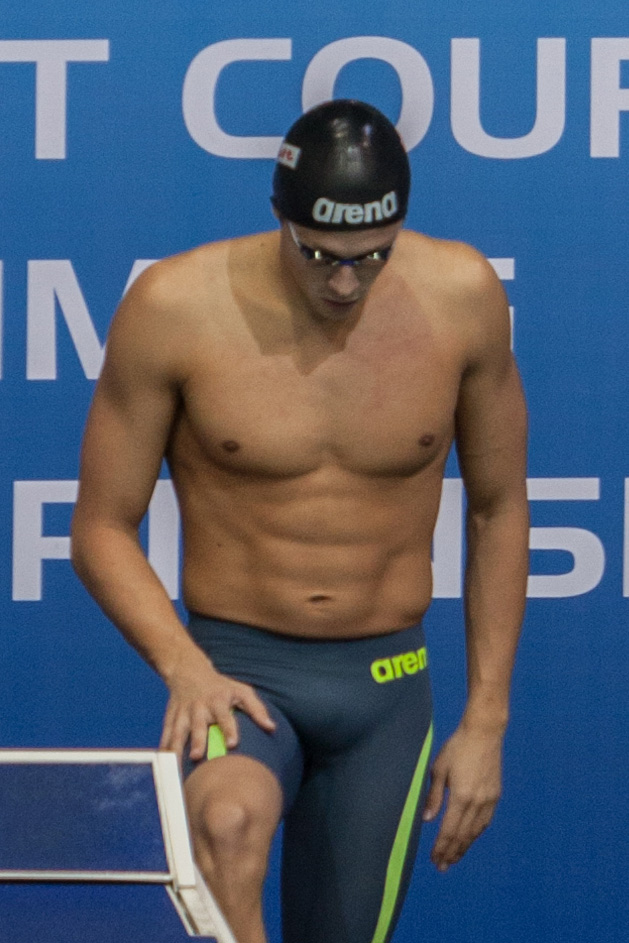
- Tsurkin at the 2015 European Short Course Championships in Netanya

Personal information
- Full name: Yauhen Mikalaevich Tsurkin
- Nationality: Belarusian
- Born: 9 November 1990 (age 35) Homel, Belarusian SSR
- Height: 1.82 m (6 ft 0 in)
- Weight: 72 kg (159 lb)

Sport
- Sport: Swimming
- Strokes: Freestyle, butterfly
- Club: Team Belarus
Medal record
World Championships (SC)
Bronze medal – third place	2016 Windsor	4x50 m medley
European Championships
Gold medal – first place	2014 Berlin	50 m butterfly
Bronze medal – third place	2012 Debrecen	50 m butterfly
European Championships (SC)
Silver medal – second place	2015 Netanya	50 m butterfly
Bronze medal – third place	2013 Herning	50 m butterfly
Bronze medal – third place	2015 Netanya	4×50 m freestyle
Bronze medal – third place	2015 Netanya	4×50 m medley
Bronze medal – third place	2017 Copenhagen	4×50 m medley
Bronze medal – third place	2019 Glasgow	4x50 m medley
Summer Universiade
Gold medal – first place	2013 Kazan	50 m butterfly
Gold medal – first place	2015 Gwangju	50 m freestyle
Silver medal – second place	2015 Gwangju	50 m butterfly
Bronze medal – third place	2015 Gwangju	100 m butterfly

Yauhen Mikalaevich Tsurkin (Belarusian: Яўген Мікалаевіч Цуркін; Łacinka: Jaŭhien Mikałajevič Curkin; born 9 November 1990) is a Belarusian swimmer, who specialized in sprint freestyle and butterfly events.

== Career ==
He won a bronze medal in the 50 m butterfly at the 2012 European Aquatics Championships in Debrecen, Hungary, in a new Belarusian record time of 23.37 seconds.

Tsurkin qualified for the men's 100 m freestyle, as a member of the Belarusian swimming team, at the 2012 Summer Olympics in London, by attaining a B-standard entry time of 49.62 seconds at the European Championships. He challenged seven other swimmers in the fourth heat, including British-born Paraguayan swimmer Benjamin Hockin. Tsurkin edged out sixth-place finisher Gabriel Melconian Alvez of Uruguay by fifteen hundredths of a second (0.15), slower than his qualifying time of 50.53 seconds. Tsurkin failed to advance into the semifinals, as he placed thirty-fourth out of 60 swimmers in the preliminaries.

At the 2012 European Short Course Swimming Championships in Chartres, France, Tsurkin lowered his national record time to 22.73 seconds, but was narrowly beaten by France's Frédérick Bousquet for top seeding in the semifinals of the men's 50 m butterfly.

He won the 50 m butterfly at the 2014 European Championships.

At the 2016 Summer Olympics, he competed in the 50 m butterfly and the 100 m freestyle, but did not progress from the heats in either event. His wife, Aliaksandra Herasimenia, won a bronze medal in the 50 m freestyle in Rio.
