= Yevgeniy Lazuka =

Azerbaijani swimmer (born 1989)

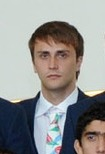
- Yevgeniy Lazuka in 2012

Personal information
- Born: April 13, 1989 (age 37) Salihorsk, Belarus

Sport
- Sport: Swimming

Yauheni Lazuka or Yevgeniy Lazuka (Belarusian: Яўген Віктаравіч Лазука, born 13 April 1989) is an Azerbaijani swimmer of Belarusian origin. At the 2008 Summer Olympics, he competed in the 100 m butterfly and the 4 × 100 m medley relay. At the 2012 Summer Olympics, he competed in the Men's 100 metre butterfly, finishing in 38th place overall in the heats, failing to qualify for the semifinals.
