= Robert Žbogar =

Slovenian swimmer

Personal information
- Born: March 6, 1989 (age 37) Kranj, Yugoslavia

Sport
- Sport: Swimming
- Strokes: Butterfly

Robert Žbogar (born 6 March 1989) is a Slovenian swimmer. At the 2012 Summer Olympics, he competed in the Men's 200 metre butterfly, finishing in 24th place overall in the heats, failing to qualify for the semifinals. He competed in the same event at 2016 Olympics.
