= Rafael Muñoz (swimmer) =

Spanish swimmer

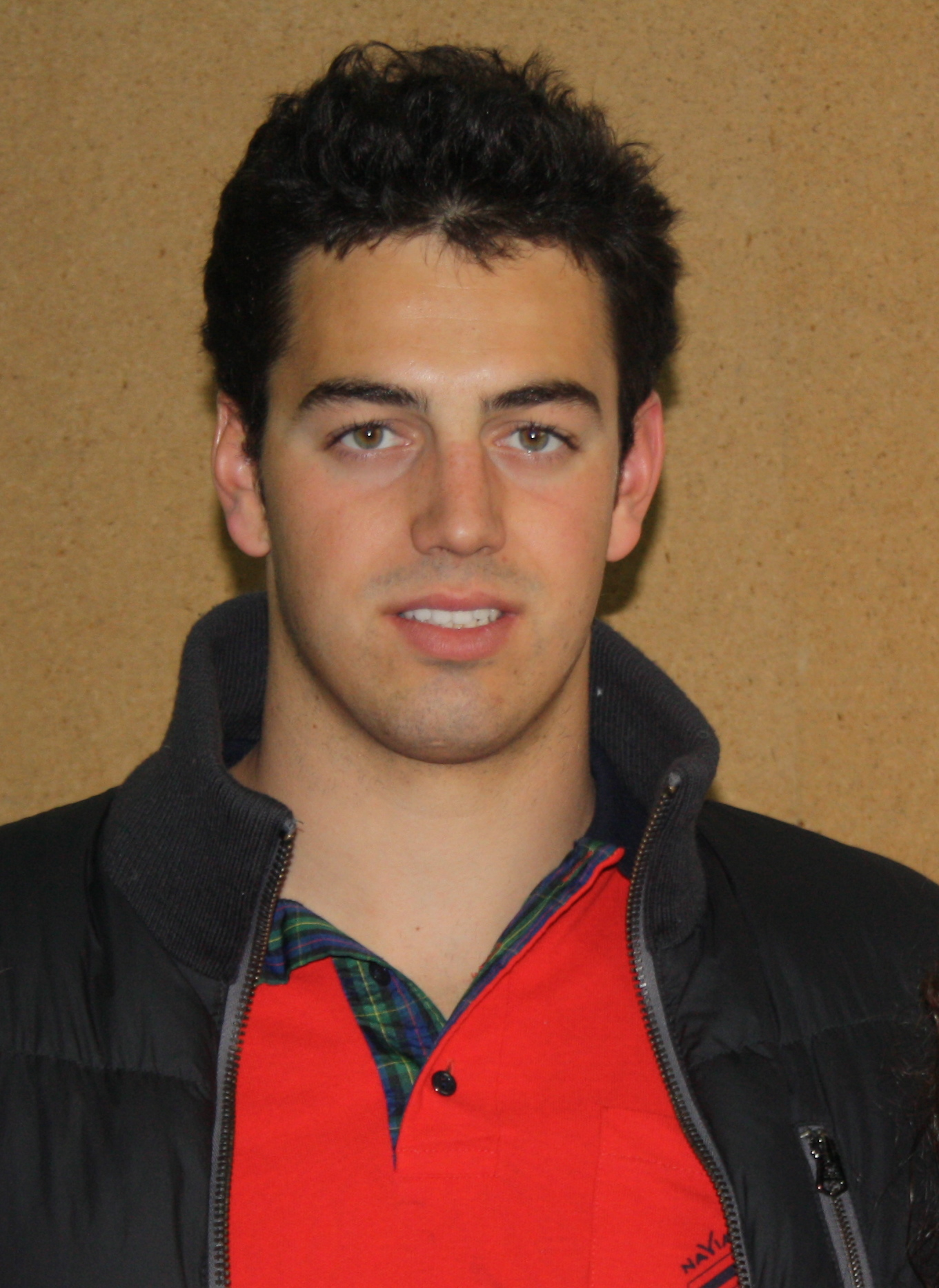

Personal information
- Full name: Rafael Muñoz Pérez
- Nickname: Rafa
- Nationality: Spain
- Born: 3 March 1988 (age 38) Córdoba, Spain
- Height: 1.90 m (6 ft 3 in)
- Weight: 77 kg (170 lb; 12.1 st)

Sport
- Sport: Swimming
- Strokes: butterfly
- Club: Navial (Spain); C.N. Marseille (France)
Medal record
World Championships (LC)
Bronze medal – third place	2009 Rome	50 m butterfly
Bronze medal – third place	2009 Rome	100 m butterfly
European Championships (LC)
Gold medal – first place	2010 Budapest	50 m butterfly
Gold medal – first place	2012 Debrecen	50 m butterfly
Bronze medal – third place	2008 Eindhoven	50 m butterfly
Bronze medal – third place	2008 Eindhoven	100 m butterfly
European Championships (SC)
Gold medal – first place	2012 Chartres	50 m butterfly
Silver medal – second place	2008 Rijeka	100 m butterfly
Silver medal – second place	2012 Chartres	100 m butterfly
Bronze medal – third place	2008 Rijeka	50 m butterfly

Rafael "Rafa" Múñoz Pérez (Note: In this Spanish name, the first or paternal surname is Muñoz and the second or maternal family name is Pérez.) (born 3 March 1988) is an Olympic swimmer from Spain. He competed for the Spanish Olympic team at the 2008 Olympic Games. He was born in Córdoba.

On 5 April 2009, at the 2009 Spanish Championships, he swam a 22.43 in the long-course 50 butterfly, going under the existing World Record of 22.96 by South Africa's Roland Schoeman. This time, however, was not recognized as the world record until 22 June, when the governing body of aquatic sports, FINA, finally accepted the controversial swimsuit he and many other swimmers had been wearing as they achieved such times. His world record was broken by Andriy Govorov in July 2018.

He was coached by Romain Barnier in France, as part of the Cercle des Nageurs de Marseille team.

== Notes ==
Records
Preceded by Roland Schoeman	Men's 50-metre butterfly world record holder (long course); 5 April 2009 – 1 July 2018	Succeeded by Andriy Govorov
