= Bence Pulai =

Hungarian swimmer (born 1991)

Personal information
- Born: 27 October 1991 (age 34) Budapest, Hungary
Medal record
Men's swimming
Representing Hungary
European Championships
Bronze medal – third place	2012 Debrecen	4x100 m medley
Bronze medal – third place	2014 Berlin	4x100 m medley
European Junior Championship (LC)
Silver medal – second place	2009 Prague	100 m butterfly
Bronze medal – third place	2009 Prague	4×100 m medley

Bence Pulai (born 27 October 1991) is a Hungarian swimmer. He was part of the Hungarian men's teams that won bronze in the men's 4 × 100 m medley relay at the 2012 and 2014 European Championships.

At the 2012 Summer Olympics, he competed in the Men's 100 metre butterfly, finishing in 12th place overall in the heats, failing to qualify for the semifinals. He also took part in the men's 4 × 100 m medley relay, with the Hungarian team finishing in 9th place.

At the 2016 Olympics, he participated in the same two events, again not reaching the final in the men's 100 m butterfly, but reaching the final with the Hungarian team that finished in 5th in the men's 4 × 100 m medley relay.

His father is Imre Pulai, Olympic champion sprint canoer.
