= Nikita Konovalov =

Russian swimmer

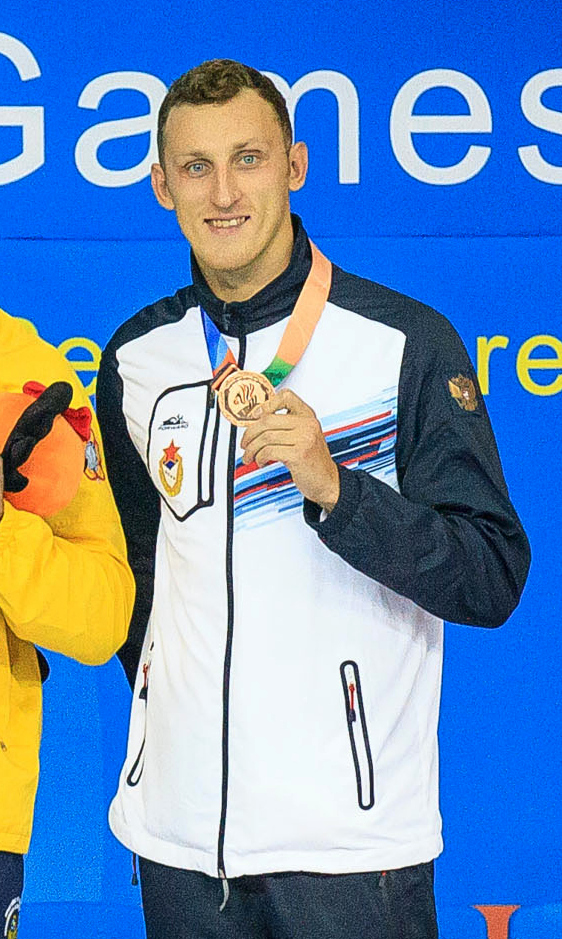
- Konovalov at the 2015 Military World Games

Personal information
- Born: 27 July 1988 (age 37) Omsk, Soviet Union

Sport
- Sport: Swimming
Medal record
Representing Russia
World Championships (LC)
| Silver medal – second place | 2009 Rome | 4×100 m freestyle |
World Championships (SC)
| Silver medal – second place | 2010 Dubai | 4×100 m medley |
| Silver medal – second place | 2010 Dubai | 4×100 m freestyle |
| Gold medal – first place | 2014 Doha | 4×50 m freestyle |
| Silver medal – second place | 2014 Doha | 4×100 m freestyle |
| Silver medal – second place | 2014 Doha | 4×50 m mixed free |
European Championships (LC)
| Bronze medal – third place | 2012 Debrecen | 4×100 m freestyle |
European Championships (SC)
| Silver medal – second place | 2011 Szczecin | 4×50 m freestyle |
| Gold medal – first place | 2013 Herning | 4×50 m freestyle |
| Gold medal – first place | 2015 Netanya | 4×50 m freestyle |
| Silver medal – second place | 2015 Netanya | 4×50 m medley |
| Silver medal – second place | 2015 Netanya | 4×50 m mixed freestyle |
| Bronze medal – third place | 2015 Netanya | 100 m butterfly |
Summer Universiade
| Gold medal – first place | 2013 Kazan | 4×100 m medley |
Military World Games
| Bronze medal – third place | 2015 Mungyeong | 50 m butterfly |

Nikita Yurievich Konovalov (Russian: Никита Юрьевич Коновалов; born 27 July 1988) is a Russian swimmer who has won more than ten medals at the European and world championships since 2009.

Konovalov was addicted to computer games, and because of that around 2006 he was skipping school and training sessions for many months. He has a tattoo covering his chest and arms, which is dedicated to Illidan Stormrage, a character in the Warcraft series of video games.
