= Romain Sassot =

French swimmer

Personal information
- Born: 26 February 1986 (age 40) Saint-Rémy, France
- Height: 190 cm (6 ft 3 in) (2012)
- Weight: 84 kg (185 lb) (2012)

Sport
- Country: France
- Sport: Swimming
Medal record
Men's swimming
Representing France
European Championships (SC)
Gold medal – first place	2012 Chartres	4×50 m medley

Romain Sassot (born 26 February 1986) is a French swimmer. He competed 4 × 100 metre medley relay event at the 2012 Summer Olympics.
