= Martin Verner =

Czech swimmer

Personal information
- Born: 5 March 1980 (age 46)

Sport
- Sport: Swimming

Martin Verner (Czech pronunciation: [ˈmarcɪn ˈvɛrnɛr]; born 5 March 1980) is a Czech swimmer. At the 2008 Summer Olympics, he competed in the men's 100 metre freestyle, finishing in 21st place and failing to reach the semi-finals. At the 2012 Summer Olympics, he competed in the Men's 100 metre freestyle, finishing in 23rd place overall in the heats, failing to qualify for the semifinals.
