= Ivan Lenđer =

Serbian swimmer

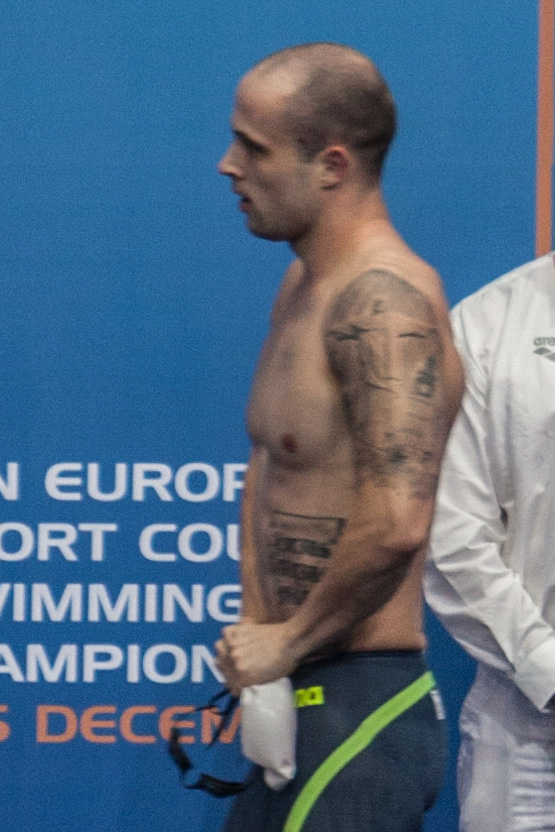
- Netanya 2015

Personal information
- Full name: Ivan Lenđer
- Nationality: Serbia
- Born: 29 July 1990 (age 35) Zrenjanin, SFR Yugoslavia
- Height: 1.88 m (6 ft 2 in)

Sport
- Sport: Swimming
- Strokes: Butterfly
- Club: Proleter, Zrenjanin
Medal record
European SC Championships
| Bronze medal – third place | 2009 Istanbul | 100 m butterfly |
Mediterranean Games
| Gold medal – first place | 2009 Pescara | 100 m butterfly |
| Gold medal – first place | 2013 Mersin | 100 m butterfly |
| Gold medal – first place | 2013 Mersin | 50 m butterfly |
| Gold medal – first place | 2018 Tarragona | 4×100 m freestyle |
| Silver medal – second place | 2009 Pescara | 50 m butterfly |
World Junior Championships
| Gold medal – first place | 2006 Rio de Janeiro | 100 m butterfly |
| Silver medal – second place | 2008 Monterrey | 50 m butterfly |
| Silver medal – second place | 2008 Monterrey | 100 m butterfly |
European Junior Championships
| Silver medal – second place | 2007 Antwerp | 50 m butterfly |
| Gold medal – first place | 2007 Antwerp | 100 m butterfly |
| Gold medal – first place | 2008 Belgrade | 50 m butterfly |
| Gold medal – first place | 2008 Belgrade | 100 m butterfly |

Ivan Lenđer (Serbian Cyrillic: Иван Ленђер, Rusyn: Иван Лендєр, pronounced [ǐʋan lêndʑer]) (born 29 July 1990, in Zrenjanin, SFR Yugoslavia) is an Olympic swimmer from Serbia. He swam for Serbia at the 2008 and 2012 Summer Olympics. In 2006 he was named Serbia's best young athlete. He is partially of Rusyn descent.

He has swum for Serbia at:

- 2006 Junior Worlds — 1st 100 fly
- 2007 European Juniors — 2nd 50 fly, 1st 100 fly
- 2008 Junior Worlds — 1st 50 fly, 1st 100 fly
- 2008 European Juniors — 1st 50 fly, 1st 100 fly
- 2008 Olympics — 40th 100 fly
- 2009 Mediterranean Games — 1st 100 fly
- 2009 World Championships — 11th 100 fly, 18th 50 fly
- 2009 Short Course Europeans — 3rd 100 fly
- 2010 European Championships — 8th 50 fly, 10th 100 fly
- 2011 World Championships — 11th 50 fly, 24th 100fly
- 2012 European Championships — 4th 100 fly, 7th 50 fly
- 2013 Mediterranean Games — 1st 50 fly, 1st 100 fly

== Olympic results ==
Olympic results
| Event | 2008 | 2012 |
|---|---|---|
| 100 m butterfly | 40th 53.41 | 18th 52.40 |
| 4 × 100 m freestyle relay | —N/a | 13th 3:18.79 |

== See also ==
- List of swimmers
- List of European Short Course Swimming Championships medalists (men)
- List of Serbian records in swimming

Awards
| Preceded by Žarko Šešum (Serbia and Montenegro) | The Best Young Athlete of Serbia; 2006 | Succeeded by Milan Mačvan |
