= Mario Todorović =

Croatian swimmer (born 1988)

Medal record

Swimming

Representing Croatia

European LC Championships
Silver medal – second place	2008 Eindhoven	4×100 m medley relay

Mediterranean Games
Gold medal – first place	Pescara 2009	50 m butterfly

Mario Todorović (born 11 October 1988 in Dubrovnik, Croatia) is a Croatian swimmer. He competed in the 100m butterfly and 4 × 100 m medley relay events at the 2008 Summer Olympics and in the 50 m freestyle event at the 2012 and 2016 Summer Olympics. Todorović also won a gold medal in the 2009 Mediterranean Games 50m butterfly and a silver medal in the 2008 European Aquatics Championships 4 × 100 m medley relay.
