= François Heersbrandt =

Belgian swimmer (born 1989)

Personal information
- Born: 12 December 1989 (age 36) Uccle, Belgium
Medal record
Men's swimming
Representing Belgium
European Championships (SC)
Bronze medal – third place	2011 Szczecin	100 m butterfly
Bronze medal – third place	2011 Szczecin	4×50 m freestyle
Bronze medal – third place	2013 Herning	4x50 m freestyle

François Heersbrandt (born 12 December 1989 in Uccle, Belgium) is a Belgian swimmer. He competed in the 100 m butterfly event at the 2012 Summer Olympics and was eliminated in the semi-finals despite setting a new Belgian record (52.22) in his qualifying heat. Heersbrandt competed in the same event at the 2008 Summer Olympics but was eliminated after the qualifying heats. At the 2016 Summer Olympics, he competed in the 50 m freestyle but did not progress beyond the first round.

At the 2011 European Short Course Swimming Championships, he won a bronze medal in the 4x50m freestyle and set a new Belgian record with a time of 1.25,83. His partners for the relay were Jasper Aerents, Emmanuel Vanluchene and Louis Croenen. Heersbrandt also holds the Belgian record for the 50m butterfly (23.66) and in the 50m butterfly and 100m butterfly on short course.
