= Swimming at the 2014 European Aquatics Championships – Men's 100 metre freestyle =

Men's 100 metre freestyle at the Swimming at the 2014 European Aquatics Championships
- Dates: 21–22 August
- Competitors: 74 from 32 nations
- Winning time: 47.98

Medalists
gold medal	Florent Manaudou	France
silver medal	Fabien Gilot	France
bronze medal	Luca Leonardi	Italy

The Men's 100 metre freestyle competition of the 2014 European Aquatics Championships was held on 21–22 August.

== Records ==
Prior to the competition, the existing world, European and championship records were as follows.

	Name	Nation	Time	Location	Date
World record	César Cielo	Brazil	46.91	Rome	30 July 2009
European record	Alain Bernard	France	47.12	Rome	30 July 2009
Championship record	Alain Bernard	France	47.50	Eindhoven	22 March 2008

== Results ==
=== Heats ===
The heats were held at 09:47.

Rank	Heat	Lane	Name	Nationality	Time	Notes
1	8	2	Luca Leonardi	Italy	48.66	Q
2	7	5	Luca Dotto	Italy	48.84	Q
3	7	7	Dominik Kozma	Hungary	48.86	Q
4	8	6	Sebastiaan Verschuren	Netherlands	48.92	Q
5	8	3	Alexander Sukhorukov	Russia	48.93	Q
6	7	6	Marco Orsi	Italy	48.94	
7	6	6	Sergey Fesikov	Russia	48.97	Q
8	7	4	Andrey Grechin	Russia	49.05	
9	6	4	Fabien Gilot	France	49.08	Q
10	6	5	Pieter Timmers	Belgium	49.14	Q
10	8	4	Vladimir Morozov	Russia	49.14	
12	6	7	Markus Deibler	Germany	49.19	Q
13	7	3	Florent Manaudou	France	49.24	Q
13	7	2	Filippo Magnini	Italy	49.24	
15	4	8	Marius Radu	Romania	49.28	Q
16	5	6	Kristian Golomeev	Greece	49.49	Q
17	8	1	Grégory Mallet	France	49.57	
18	7	1	Kacper Majchrzak	Poland	49.58	Q
19	6	2	Christos Katrantzis	Greece	49.62	Q
20	5	5	Markel Alberdi	Spain	49.66	Q
21	6	3	Mehdy Metella	France	49.68	
22	8	0	Ben Proud	Great Britain	49.70	Q
23	7	0	Jasper Aerents	Belgium	49.77	
24	8	8	Arseni Kukharau	Belarus	49.80	
25	5	8	Mindaugas Sadauskas	Lithuania	49.84	
26	4	9	Baslakov İskender	Turkey	49.89	
27	6	8	Emmanuel Vanluchene	Belgium	50.07	
28	4	6	Christoffer Carlsen	Sweden	50.09	
29	5	4	Krisztián Takács	Hungary	50.11	
30	5	1	Sebastian Szczepański	Poland	50.12	
31	5	3	Péter Holoda	Hungary	50.14	
32	6	9	Martin Verner	Czech Republic	50.18	
33	8	7	Doğa Çelik	Turkey	50.25	
34	4	1	Mislav Sever	Croatia	50.28	
35	5	2	Glenn Surgeloose	Belgium	50.29	
36	4	7	Alexi Konovalov	Israel	50.34	
37	8	9	Pjotr Degtjarjov	Estonia	50.44	
38	3	1	Ari-Pekka Liukkonen	Finland	50.45	
39	4	3	Joost Reijns	Netherlands	50.53	
40	4	5	Sidni Hoxha	Albania	50.54	
40	7	9	Norbert Trandafir	Romania	50.54	
42	1	1	Tadas Duškinas	Lithuania	50.58	
43	3	4	Radovan Siljevski	Serbia	50.60	
44	5	7	Mario Todorović	Croatia	50.61	
45	2	6	Daniel Macovei	Romania	50.62	
46	5	9	Simonas Bilis	Lithuania	50.63	
47	6	1	Bruno Ortiz-Cañavate	Spain	50.64	
48	3	5	Pawel Werner	Poland	50.75	
49	2	2	Alexandre Haldemann	Switzerland	50.80	
50	3	8	Dawid Zieliński	Poland	50.86	
51	3	6	Alexander Nyström	Sweden	50.91	
52	5	0	David Gamburg	Israel	50.92	
53	2	5	Christian Scherübl	Austria	51.03	
54	1	4	Ensar Hajder	Bosnia and Herzegovina	51.05	
55	4	0	Oscar Ekström	Sweden	51.15	
55	3	7	David Karasek	Switzerland	51.15	
57	4	4	Ivan Levaj	Croatia	51.20	
58	2	1	Felix Auböck	Austria	51.22	
59	6	0	Miguel Ortiz-Cañavate	Spain	51.27	
59	2	3	Gustav Aberg	Sweden	51.27	
61	3	9	Boris Stojanović	Serbia	51.30	
62	3	2	Almog Olshtein	Israel	51.40	
63	1	3	Deividas Margevičius	Lithuania	51.56	
64	3	0	Julien Henx	Luxembourg	51.58	
65	2	4	Daniel Skaaning	Denmark	51.59	
66	3	3	Nikša Stojkovski	Croatia	51.71	
67	2	8	Alin Coste	Romania	51.75	
68	2	7	Martin Zhelev	Bulgaria	51.84	
69	2	0	Michal Navara	Slovakia	51.85	
70	1	5	Heiko Gigler	Austria	52.28	
71	2	9	Davit Sikharulidze	Georgia	52.30	
72	1	2	Alexandre Bakhtiarov	Cyprus	52.75	
73	1	6	Arnel Dudić	Bosnia and Herzegovina	53.12	
74	1	7	Fred Karu	Estonia	54.65	
—	4	2	Nimrod Shapira Bar-Or	Israel		DNS
—	7	8	Kemal Arda Gürdal	Turkey		DNS
—	8	5	Paul Biedermann	Germany		DNS

=== Semifinals ===
The semifinals were held at 18.23.

==== Semifinal 1 ====
Rank	Lane	Name	Nationality	Time	Notes
1	2	Florent Manaudou	France	48.61	Q
2	4	Luca Dotto	Italy	48.68	Q
3	3	Sergey Fesikov	Russia	48.91	Q
4	6	Pieter Timmers	Belgium	48.96	
5	5	Sebastiaan Verschuren	Netherlands	49.05	
6	1	Christos Katrantzis	Greece	49.07	
7	8	Ben Proud	Great Britain	49.33	
8	7	Kristian Golomeev	Greece	49.73	

==== Semifinal 2 ====
Rank	Lane	Name	Nationality	Time	Notes
1	4	Luca Leonardi	Italy	48.67	Q
1	6	Fabien Gilot	France	48.67	Q
3	5	Dominik Kozma	Hungary	48.83	Q
4	3	Alexander Sukhorukov	Russia	48.94	Q
5	7	Marius Radu	Romania	48.95	Q
6	2	Markus Deibler	Germany	49.13	
7	1	Kacper Majchrzak	Poland	49.18	
8	8	Markel Alberdi	Spain	49.55	

=== Final ===
The final was held at 18:47.

Rank	Lane	Name	Nationality	Time	Notes
1st place, gold medalist(s)	4	Florent Manaudou	France	47.98	
2nd place, silver medalist(s)	5	Fabien Gilot	France	48.36	
3rd place, bronze medalist(s)	3	Luca Leonardi	Italy	48.38	
4	1	Alexander Sukhorukov	Russia	48.52	
5	6	Luca Dotto	Italy	48.58	
6	2	Dominik Kozma	Hungary	48.76	
7	7	Sergey Fesikov	Russia	48.82	
8	8	Marius Radu	Romania	49.05	
