= Swimming at the 2014 European Aquatics Championships – Men's 4 × 100 metre freestyle relay =

Men's 4 × 100 metre freestyle relay at the Swimming at the 2014 European Aquatics Championships
- Dates: 18 August
- Competitors: 65 from 15 nations
- Winning time: 3:11.64

Medalists
gold medal	Mehdy Metella; Fabien Gilot; Florent Manaudou; Jérémy Stravius; Grégory Mallet; Clément Mignon	France
silver medal	Andrey Grechin; Nikita Lobintsev; Alexandr Sukhorukov; Vladimir Morozov; Sergey Fesikov; Oleg Tikhobaev	Russia
bronze medal	Luca Dotto; Marco Orsi; Luca Leonardi; Filippo Magnini; Marco Belotti	Italy

The Men's 4 × 100 metre freestyle relay competition of the 2014 European Aquatics Championships was held on 18 August.

== Records ==
Prior to the competition, the existing world, European and championship records were as follows.

	Nation	Time	Location	Date
World record	United States	3:08.24	Beijing	11 August 2008
European record	France	3:08.32	Beijing	11 August 2008
Championship record	Russia	3:12.46	Budapest	9 August 2010

== Results ==
=== Heats ===
The heats were held at 11:31.

Rank	Heat	Lane	Nationality	Swimmers	Time	Notes
1	2	8	Russia	Andrey Grechin (48.25); Sergey Fesikov (48.52); Oleg Tikhobaev (48.97); Nikita Lobintsev (48.43)	3:14.17	Q
2	1	8	Italy	Luca Dotto (48.55); Marco Belotti (49.50); Luca Leonardi (47.80); Marco Orsi (48.53)	3:14.38	Q
3	1	1	Poland	Konrad Czerniak (48.43); Sebastian Sczcepanski (49.65); Kacper Majchrzak (48.99); Paweł Korzeniowski (48.71)	3:15.78	Q
4	2	3	France	Mehdy Metella (49.22); Grégory Mallet (48.91); Clément Mignon (49.46); Fabien Gilot (48.65)	3:16.24	Q
5	2	2	Belgium	Jasper Aerents (49.60); Emmanuel Vanluchene (49.38); Glenn Surgeloose (48.96); Pieter Timmers (48.57)	3:16.51	Q
6	1	2	Spain	Markel Alberdi (49.25); Bruno Ortiz-Cañavate (49.06); Miguel Ortiz-Cañavate (49.48); Juan Miguel Rando (49.68)	3:17.47	Q
7	2	7	Israel	David Gamburg (50.32); Tom Kremer (49.41); Nimrod Shapira (49.72); Alexi Konovalov (49.50)	3:18.95	Q
8	1	6	Lithuania	Danas Rapšys (49.73); Simonas Bilis (49.47); Tadas Duškinas (51.01); Mindaugas Sadauskas (49.70)	3:19.91	Q
9	2	5	Croatia	Ivan Levaj (50.37); Mario Todorović (50.57); Niksa Stojkovski (50.32); Mislav Sever (49.31)	3:20.57	
10	1	4	Sweden	Oscar Ekström (50.92); Alexander Nyström (49.78); Christoffer Carlsen (49.98); Gustav Åberg Lejdström (50.06)	3:20.74	
11	2	1	Switzerland	Jean-Baptiste Febo (51.21); David Karasek (50.66); Alexandre Haldemann (50.20); Nico van Duijn (49.94)	3:22.01	
12	2	4	Luxembourg	Julien Henx (50.91); Raphaël Stacchiotti (50.58); Jean-François Schneiders (51.07); Pit Brandenburger (50.53)	3:23.09	
13	2	6	Czech Republic	Pavel Janeček (51.28); Martin Verner (49.53); David Kunčar (51.31); Tomáš Havránek (51.00)	3:23.12	
14	1	3	Turkey	Doğa Çelik (50.12); İskender Başlakov (51.56); Alpkan Örnek (51.86); Doruk Tekin (52.02)	3:25.56	
	1	5	Romania	Marius Radu (49.11); Daniel Macovei (50.14); Alin Coste (DSQ); Norbert Trandafir	DSQ	
	1	7	Serbia		DNS	

=== Final ===
The final was held at 19:22.

Rank	Lane	Name	Nationality	Time	Notes
1st place, gold medalist(s)	6	France	Mehdy Metella (48.69); Fabien Gilot (47.85); Florent Manaudou (47.54); Jérémy Stravius (47.56)	3:11.64	CR
2nd place, silver medalist(s)	4	Russia	Andrey Grechin (48.56); Nikita Lobintsev (48.54); Alexander Sukhorukov (47.58); Vladimir Morozov (47.99)	3:12.67	
3rd place, bronze medalist(s)	5	Italy	Luca Dotto (48.47); Marco Orsi (48.36); Luca Leonardi (47.69); Filippo Magnini (48.26)	3:12.78	
4	3	Poland	Konrad Czerniak (48.84); Kacper Majchrzak (48.58); Sebastian Szczepański (49.16); Paweł Korzeniowski (48.52)	3:15.10	
5	2	Belgium	Emmanuel Vanluchene (49.73); Glenn Surgeloose (49.10); Jasper Aerents (49.62); Pieter Timmers (48.17)	3:16.62	
6	1	Israel	David Gamburg (50.16); Tom Kremer (49.16); Nimrod Shapira (49.66); Alexi Konovalov (49.45)	3:18.43	
7	8	Lithuania	Danas Rapšys (49.99); Simonas Bilis (49.50); Tadas Duškinas (50.44); Mindaugas Sadauskas (49.53)	3:19.46	
	7	Spain	Markel Alberdi (49.68); Bruno Ortiz-Cañavate (49.21); Miguel Ortiz-Cañavate (49.68); Juan Miguel Rando	DSQ	
