= Swimming at the 2013 World Aquatics Championships – Men's 4 × 100 metre freestyle relay =

Men's 4 × 100 metre freestyle relay at the 2013 World Aquatics Championships
- Venue: Palau Sant Jordi
- Dates: July 28, 2013 (heats & final)
- Competitors: 68 from 17 nations
- Winning time: 3:11.18

Medalists
gold medal	Yannick Agnel; Florent Manaudou; Fabien Gilot; Jérémy Stravius	France
silver medal	Nathan Adrian; Ryan Lochte; Anthony Ervin; Jimmy Feigen	United States
bronze medal	Andrey Grechin; Nikita Lobintsev; Vladimir Morozov; Danila Izotov	Russia

Barcelona Palau San Jordi

The men's 4 × 100 metre freestyle relay event in swimming at the 2013 World Aquatics Championships took place on 28 July at the Palau Sant Jordi in Barcelona, Spain.

== Records ==
Prior to this competition, the existing world and championship records were:

World record	United States (USA); Michael Phelps (47.51); Garrett Weber-Gale (47.02); Cullen Jones (47.65); Jason Lezak (46.06)	3:08.24	Beijing, China	11 August 2008
Competition record	United States (USA); Michael Phelps (47.78); Ryan Lochte (47.03); Matt Grevers (47.61); Nathan Adrian (46.79)	3:09.21	Rome, Italy	26 July 2009

== Results ==
=== Heats ===
The heats were held at 12:18.

Rank	Heat	Lane	Name	Nationality	Time	Notes
1	1	4	Jimmy Feigen (48.39); Anthony Ervin (47.38); Ricky Berens (47.56); Conor Dwyer (48.36)	United States	3:11.69	Q
2	2	5	Andrey Grechin (48.07); Yevgeny Lagunov (48.47); Alexander Sukhorukov (48.11); Danila Izotov (47.78)	Russia	3:12.43	Q
3	1	5	James Roberts (48.57); Kenneth To (48.05); Matthew Targett (48.26); Tommaso D'Orsogna (48.16)	Australia	3:13.04	Q
4	2	4	Amaury Leveaux (49.14); Fabien Gilot (47.68); Grégory Mallet (48.70); William Meynard (48.49)	France	3:14.01	Q
5	1	6	Luca Leonardi (48.88); Marco Orsi (48.06); Michele Santucci (48.95); Filippo Magnini (48.24)	Italy	3:14.13	Q
6	1	7	Marcelo Chierighini (48.91); Nicolas Oliveira (48.05); Fernando Santos (48.43); Vinícius Waked (49.02)	Brazil	3:14.41	Q
7	1	3	Steffen Deibler (48.69); Marco di Carli (48.91); Christoph Fildebrandt (48.49); Markus Deibler (48.61)	Germany	3:14.70	Q
8	2	7	Shinri Shioura (49.00); Kenji Kobase (49.67); Takuro Fujii (48.80); Kenta Ito (47.99)	Japan	3:15.46	Q
9	2	6	Dieter Dekoninck (49.48); Emmanuel Vanluchene (48.71); Glenn Surgeloose (48.45); Jasper Aerents (48.88)	Belgium	3:15.52	
10	1	2	Lü Zhiwu (49.11); Lou Junyi (49.83); Shi Tengfei (49.04); Chen Zuo (49.34)	China	3:17.32	
11	2	3	Leith Shankland (49.96); Chad le Clos (47.97); Gerhard Zandberg (50.18); Devon Myles Brown (49.80)	South Africa	3:17.91	
12	2	0	Doğa Çelik (49.64); İskender Baslakov (50.07); Furkan Marasli (51.15); Kemal Arda Gürdal (49.14)	Turkey	3:20.00	
13	2	1	Jan Šefl (50.82); Tomáš Plevko (49.35); Martin Žikmund (50.79); Martin Verner (49.16)	Czech Republic	3:20.12	
14	2	2	Joel Greenshields (50.49); Thomas Gossland (50.03); Luke Peddie (49.73); Hassaan Abdel Khalik (49.99)	Canada	3:20.24	
15	2	8	Yang Jung-Doo (50.79); Chang Gyu-Cheol (51.65); Jeong Jeong-Soo (52.14); Shin Hee-Woong (50.92)	South Korea	3:25.50	
16	1	1	Ahmed Akaram (52.05); Marwan Ismail (51.04); Mohamed Khaled (50.37); Shehab Younis (52.79)	Egypt	3:26.25	
	1	8	Aitor Martínez (49.72); Markel Alberdi (49.94); Juan Miguel Rando; Aschwin Wildeboer	Spain		DSQ

=== Final ===
The final was held at 19:34.

Rank	Lane	Swimmers	Nation	Time	Notes
1st place, gold medalist(s)	6	Yannick Agnel (48.76); Florent Manaudou (47.93); Fabien Gilot (46.90); Jérémy Stravius (47.59)	France	3:11.18	
2nd place, silver medalist(s)	4	Nathan Adrian (47.95); Ryan Lochte (47.80); Anthony Ervin (47.44); Jimmy Feigen (48.23)	United States	3:11.42	
3rd place, bronze medalist(s)	5	Andrey Grechin (48.09); Nikita Lobintsev (47.91); Vladimir Morozov (47.40); Danila Izotov (48.04)	Russia	3:11.44	
4	3	James Magnussen (48.00); Cameron McEvoy (47.44); Tommaso D'Orsogna (48.05); James Roberts (48.09)	Australia	3:11.58	
5	2	Luca Dotto (49.17); Luca Leonardi (48.08); Marco Orsi (47.25); Filippo Magnini (48.12)	Italy	3:12.62	
6	1	Steffen Deibler (48.43); Markus Deibler (48.59); Christoph Fildebrandt (48.42); Dimitri Colupaev (48.33)	Germany	3:13.77	
7	7	Nicolas Oliveira (48.72); Fernando Santos (48.98); Vinícius Waked (49.19); Marcelo Chierighini (47.56)	Brazil	3:14.45	
8	8	Shinri Shioura (48.69); Kenji Kobase (49.09); Takuro Fujii (48.60); Kenta Ito (48.37)	Japan	3:14.75	
