= Swimming at the 2016 European Aquatics Championships – Men's 4 × 100 metre freestyle relay =

Men's 4 × 100 metre freestyle relay at the 2016 European Aquatics Championships
- Dates: 16 May
- Competitors: 65 from 15 nations
- Teams: 15
- Winning time: 3:13.48

Medalists
gold medal	William Meynard; Florent Manaudou; Fabien Gilot; Clément Mignon	France
silver medal	Luca Dotto; Luca Leonardi; Jonathan Boffa; Filippo Magnini	Italy
bronze medal	Glenn Surgeloose; Jasper Aerents; Dieter Dekoninck; Pieter Timmers	Belgium

The Men's 4 × 100 metre freestyle relay competition of the 2016 European Aquatics Championships was held on 16 May 2016.

== Records ==
Prior to the competition, the existing world, European and championship records were as follows.

	Nation	Time	Location	Date
World record	United States	3:08.24	Beijing	11 August 2008
European record	France	3:08.32	Beijing	11 August 2008
Championship record	France	3:11.64	Berlin	18 August 2014

== Results ==
=== Heats ===
The heats were held at 12:07.

Rank	Heat	Lane	Nation	Swimmers	Time	Notes
1	1	1	France	Clement Mignon (48.88); William Meynard (49.59); Fabien Gilot (48.37); Lorys Bourelly (49.38)	3:16.22	Q
2	1	3	Italy	Luca Dotto (48.40); Giuseppe Guttuso (49.78); Jonathan Boffa (49.07); Luca Leonardi (49.17)	3:16.42	Q
3	2	2	Belgium	Louis Croenen (50.07); Jasper Aerents (48.70); Glenn Surgeloose (48.67); Dieter Dekoninck (49.09)	3:16.53	Q
4	2	8	Romania	Marius Radu (49.28); Daniel Macovei (49.43); Alin Coste (49.14); Norbert Trandafir (48.69)	3:16.54	Q
5	2	6	Greece	Odyssefs Meladinis (49.61); Apostolos Christou (49.26); Christos Katrantzis (49.41); Kristian Golomeev (48.54)	3:16.82	Q
6	2	5	Hungary	Péter Holoda (49.58); Krisztián Takács (49.76); Richárd Bohus (48.94); Dominik Kozma (48.87)	3:17.15	Q
7	2	1	Spain	Aitor Martinez Rodriguez (49.63); Miguel Ortiz-Cañavate (49.09); Bruno Ortiz-Cañavate (50.08); Oskitz Aguilar Urtxegi (49.51)	3:18.31	Q
8	1	2	Great Britain	Robert Renwick (49.78); Benjamin Proud (50.52); Ieuan Lloyd (49.38); Duncan Scott (48.78)	3:18.46	Q
9	1	7	Turkey	Huseyin Emre Sakci (50.28); Doga Celik (49.40); Iskender Baslakov (50.06); Kemal Arda Gürdal (48.92)	3:18.66	
10	1	4	Sweden	Christoffer Carlsen (49.88); Isak Eliasson (49.06); Robin Andreasson (49.57); Daniel Forndal (50.19)	3:18.70	
11	1	6	Lithuania	Mindaugas Sadauskas (49.64); Simonas Bilis (48.51); Tadas Duskinas (50.35); Povilas Strazdas (50.28)	3:18.78	
12	2	3	Poland	Paweł Korzeniowski (49.47); Kacper Majchrzak (48.92); Filip Wypych (50.44); Oskar Krupecki (50.38)	3:19.21	
13	1	5	Israel	Alexi Konovalov (50.16); Or Sabatier (49.50); Ziv Kalontarov (50.46); Tom Kremer (49.35)	3:19.47	
14	2	7	Switzerland	Alexandre Haldemann (49.87); Erik van Dooren (50.53); Aleksi Schmid (49.85); Nils Liess (50.15)	3:20.40	
15	2	4	Estonia	Ralf Tribuntsov (51.39); Andri Aedma (50.62); Kregor Zirk (49.61); Pjotr Degtjarjov (48.90)	3:20.52	

=== Final ===
The final was held at 19:26.

Rank	Lane	Nation	Swimmers	Time	Notes
1st place, gold medalist(s)	4	France	William Meynard (49.57); Florent Manaudou (47.64); Fabien Gilot (48.26); Clement Mignon (48.01)	3:13.48	
2nd place, silver medalist(s)	5	Italy	Luca Dotto (48.03); Luca Leonardi (48.47); Jonathan Boffa (49.21); Filippo Magnini (48.58)	3:14.29	
3rd place, bronze medalist(s)	3	Belgium	Glenn Surgeloose (48.75); Jasper Aerents (49.31); Dieter Dekoninck (48.87); Pieter Timmers (47.37)	3:14.30	
4	2	Greece	Odyssefs Meladinis (49.60); Christos Katrantzis (48.65); Apostolos Christou (48.13); Kristian Golomeev (48.04)	3:14.42	
5	7	Hungary	Péter Holoda (49.91); Krisztián Takács (49.41); Richárd Bohus (48.64); Dominik Kozma (48.59)	3:16.55	
6	6	Romania	Marius Radu (49.08); Robert Glință (49.24); Alin Coste (49.91); Norbert Trandafir (48.85)	3:17.08	
7	8	Great Britain	Robert Renwick (49.79); Duncan Scott (48.31); Ieuan Lloyd (49.70); Benjamin Proud (49.33)	3:17.13	
8	1	Spain	Markel Alberdi (49.76); Aitor Martinez Rodriguez (49.63); Miguel Ortiz-Cañavate (48.62); Oskitz Aguilar Urtxegi (49.20)	3:17.21	
