= Swimming at the 2015 World Aquatics Championships – Men's 4 × 100 metre freestyle relay =

Men's 4 × 100 metre freestyle relay at the 2015 World Aquatics Championships
- Dates: 2 August (heats and final)
- Competitors: 123 from 30 nations
- Winning time: 3:10.74

Medalists
gold medal	Mehdy Metella; Florent Manaudou; Fabien Gilot; Jérémy Stravius; Lorys Bourelly; Clément Mignon	France
silver medal	Andrey Grechin; Nikita Lobintsev; Vladimir Morozov; Alexandr Sukhorukov; Danila Izotov	Russia
bronze medal	Luca Dotto; Marco Orsi; Michele Santucci; Filippo Magnini	Italy

The Men's 4 × 100 metre freestyle relay competition of the swimming events at the 2015 World Aquatics Championships was held on 2 August with the heats and the final.

== Records ==
Prior to the competition, the existing world and championship records were as follows.

World record	United States	3:08.24	Beijing, China	11 August 2008
Competition record	United States	3:09.21	Rome, Italy	26 July 2009

== Results ==
=== Heats ===
The heats were held at 12:10.

Rank	Heat	Lane	Nation	Swimmers	Time	Notes
1	3	9	Russia	Andrey Grechin (48.42); Danila Izotov (48.08); Vladimir Morozov (48.00); Alexandr Sukhorukov (47.96)	3:12.46	Q
2	2	2	Brazil	Marcelo Chierighini (48.65); Matheus Santana (48.25); Bruno Fratus (48.55); João de Lucca (48.54)	3:13.99	Q
3	2	6	Italy	Luca Dotto (48.92); Marco Orsi (47.91); Michele Santucci (48.98); Filippo Magnini (48.63)	3:14.44	Q
4	2	4	France	Mehdy Metella (48.51); Lorys Bourelly (49.11); Fabien Gilot (48.12); Clément Mignon (48.79)	3:14.53	Q
5	2	8	Japan	Katsumi Nakamura (48.60); Shinri Shioura (48.46); Yuki Kobori (48.83); Takuro Fujii (48.87)	3:14.76	Q
6	3	6	Canada	Santo Condorelli (48.25); Karl Krug (49.19); Evan van Moerkerke (49.37); Yuri Kisil (48.19)	3:15.00	Q
7	3	2	Poland	Paweł Korzeniowski (49.21); Kacper Majchrzak (48.42); Jan Hołub (49.39); Konrad Czerniak (48.16)	3:15.18	Q
8	3	8	China	Ning Zetao (48.36); Lin Yongqing (48.85); Xu Qiheng (49.44); Yu Hexin (48.82)	3:15.47	Q
9	2	0	Belgium	Jasper Aerents (49.37); Emmanuel Vanluchene (49.21); Pieter Timmers (47.85); Glenn Surgeloose (49.07)	3:15.50	
10	2	1	Great Britain	Calum Jarvis (49.27); Ben Proud (48.93); Robert Renwick (48.82); Duncan Scott (48.68)	3:15.70	
11	4	3	United States	Jimmy Feigen (49.21); Anthony Ervin (49.69); Matt Grevers (48.67); Conor Dwyer (48.44)	3:16.01	
11	4	7	Germany	Maximilian Oswald (49.71); Steffen Deibler (48.24); Marco di Carli (48.83); Paul Biedermann (49.23)	3:16.01	
13	3	3	Australia	Tommaso D'Orsogna (49.75); Kyle Chalmers (47.92); Matthew Abood (48.78); Ashley Delaney (49.89)	3:16.34	
14	4	5	Greece	Odysseus Meladinis (49.96); Kristian Golomeev (48.44); Christos Katrantzis (49.26); Andreas Vazaios (49.17)	3:16.83	
15	4	2	Turkey	Iskender Baslakov (50.24); Doğa Çelik (49.20); Kaan Turker Ayar (49.72); Kemal Arda Gürdal (48.81)	3:17.97	
16	2	5	Romania	Marius Radu (49.40); Daniel Macovei (49.66); Alexandru Coci (49.84); Robert Glință (49.23)	3:18.13	
17	4	1	Israel	Liran Konovalov (50.10); Yakov Toumarkin (49.42); Ziv Kalontarov (50.18); David Gamburg (48.61)	3:18.31	
18	4	4	Belarus	Arseni Kukharau (49.89); Anton Latkin (50.14); Yauhen Tsurkin (49.25); Artsiom Machekin (49.12)	3:18.40	
19	4	8	Lithuania	Simonas Bilis (49.49); Mindaugas Sadauskas (49.78); Povilas Strazdas (50.33); Tadas Duškinas (50.55)	3:20.15	
20	3	1	Egypt	Omar Eissa (50.43); Mohamed Khaled (49.79); Marwan El-Kamash (49.83); Ali Khalafalla (50.54)	3:20.59	
21	3	4	Serbia	Ivan Lenđer (49.95); Uroš Nikolić (50.47); Andrej Barna (49.91); Boris Stojanović (50.88)	3:21.21	
22	4	6	Estonia	Ralf Tribuntsov (50.16); Kregor Zirk (50.46); Martti Aljand (50.85); Pjotr Degtjarjov (50.08)	3:21.55	NR
23	3	0	Venezuela	Cristian Quintero (49.45); Albert Subirats (50.67); Daniele Tirabassi (50.62); Jesús López (51.06)	3:21.80	
24	4	0	Switzerland	Alexandre Haldemann (50.21); Nils Liess (50.55); Jean-Baptiste Febo (51.01); Nico van Duijn (50.84)	3:22.61	
25	3	7	Mexico	Alejandro Escudero (51.03); Lorenzo Loria (51.26); Mateo González (50.73); Daniel Ramirez Carranza (50.47)	3:23.49	
26	4	9	Ukraine	Vitalii Alpatov (51.40); Bogdan Plavin (52.00); Illia Teslenko (50.37); Andriy Hovorov (50.30)	3:24.07	
27	1	5	Uzbekistan	Daniil Tulupov (50.40); Daniil Bukin (53.36); Aleksey Derlyugov (51.26); Khurshidjon Tursunov (51.34)	3:26.36	
28	2	3	Singapore	Quah Zheng Wen (51.13); Yeo Kai Quan (50.82); Pang Sheng Jun (51.78); Khoo Chien Yin Lionel (53.28)	3:27.01	
29	2	7	Paraguay	Charles Hockin Brusquetti (51.21); Matias Lopez (52.07); Renato Prono (55.18); Ben Hockin (49.58)	3:28.04	
30	1	3	India	Aaron D'Souza (51.38); Virdhawal Khade (51.70); Saurabh Sangvekar (53.56); Sajan Prakash (52.32)	3:28.96	
	1	4	Kuwait		DNS	
	3	5	Uruguay		DNS	

=== Final ===
The final was held at 19:03.

Rank	Lane	Swimmers	Nation	Time	Notes
1st place, gold medalist(s)	6	Mehdy Metella (48.37); Florent Manaudou (47.93); Fabien Gilot (47.08); Jérémy Stravius (47.36)	France	3:10.74	
2nd place, silver medalist(s)	4	Andrey Grechin (48.60); Nikita Lobintsev (47.98); Vladimir Morozov (46.95); Alexandr Sukhorukov (47.66)	Russia	3:11.19	
3rd place, bronze medalist(s)	3	Luca Dotto (48.75); Marco Orsi (47.75); Michele Santucci (48.48); Filippo Magnini (47.55)	Italy	3:12.53	
4	5	Marcelo Chierighini (48.54); Matheus Santana (48.20); Bruno Fratus (48.08); João de Lucca (48.40)	Brazil	3:13.22	
5	1	Paweł Korzeniowski (48.77); Kacper Majchrzak (48.50); Jan Hołub (49.09); Konrad Czerniak (47.76)	Poland	3:14.12	NR
6	2	Katsumi Nakamura (49.10); Shinri Shioura (48.35); Yuki Kobori (48.69); Takuro Fujii (48.90)	Japan	3:15.04	
7	8	Ning Zetao (48.37); Yu Hexin (48.71); Lin Yongqing (49.18); Xu Qiheng (49.15)	China	3:15.41	
8	7	Santo Condorelli (48.33); Yuri Kisil (48.73); Karl Krug (49.51); Evan van Moerkerke (49.37)	Canada	3:15.94	
