= Swimming at the 2014 European Aquatics Championships – Men's 4 × 200 metre freestyle relay =

Men's 4 × 200 metre freestyle relay at the Swimming at the 2014 European Aquatics Championships
- Dates: 23 August
- Competitors: 64 from 16 nations
- Winning time: 7:09.00

Medalists
gold medal	Robin Backhaus; Yannick Lebherz; Clemens Rapp; Paul Biedermann	Germany
silver medal	Artem Lobuzov; Dmitry Ermakov; Alexander Krasnykh; Alexandr Sukhorukov	Russia
bronze medal	Louis Croenen; Glenn Surgeloose; Emmanuel Vanluchene; Pieter Timmers	Belgium

The Men's 4 × 200 metre freestyle relay competition of the 2014 European Aquatics Championships was held on 23 August.

== Records ==
Prior to the competition, the existing world, European and championship records were as follows.

	Nation	Time	Location	Date
World record	United States	6:58.55	Rome	31 July 2009
European record	Russia	6:59.15	Rome	31 July 2009
Championship record	Russia	7:06.71	Budapest	14 August 2010

== Results ==
=== Heats ===
The heats were held at 10:18.

Rank	Heat	Lane	Nationality	Swimmers	Time	Notes
1	2	7	Germany	Robin Backhaus (1:47.76); Yannick Lebherz (1:47.67); Clemens Rapp (1:47.75); Paul Biedermann (1:47.08)	7:10.26	Q
2	2	1	Russia	Nikita Lobintsev (1:48.50); Alexander Krasnykh (1:47.36); Dmitry Ermakov (1:46.86); Viatcheslav Andrusenko (1:48.65)	7:11.37	Q
3	1	1	Netherlands	Ferry Weertman (1:50.19); Dion Dreesens (1:47.74); Joost Reijns (1:49.82); Sebastiaan Verschuren (1:47.77)	7:15.52	Q
4	1	3	Italy	Federico Turrini (1:50.13); Marco Belotti (1:49.39); Damiano Lestingi (1:47.96); Gabriele Detti (1:48.29)	7:15.77	Q
5	2	4	Spain	Eduardo Salaeche (1:50.13); Albert Puig (1:49.05); Manuel Victor Martin (1:48.36); Miguel Duran (1:48.57)	7:16.11	Q
6	1	7	Belgium	Ken Cortens (1:51.21); Glenn Surgeloose (1:48.49); Emmanuel Vanluchene (1:49.42); Pieter Timmers (1:47.21)	7:16.33	Q
7	2	5	France	Theo Fuchs (1:50.39); Lorys Bourelly (1:48.60); Clement Mignon (1:49.06); Gregory Mallet (1:48.49)	7:16.54	Q
8	2	3	Poland	Jan Świtkowski (1:50.57); Kacper Majchrzak (1:48.79); Pawel Werner (1:50.63); Dawid Zieliński (1:49.11)	7:19.10	Q
9	2	2	Sweden	Matthias Carlsson (1:50.72); Oscar Ekstroem (1:49.31); Simon Sjödin (1:49.48); Adam Paulsson (1:50.58)	7:20.09	
10	1	2	Austria	David Brandl (1:49.83); Christian Scherübl (1:49.79); Felix Auboeck (1:49.41); Jakub Maly (1:51.44)	7:20.47	
11	1	8	Denmark	Anders Lie (1:48.63); Viktor Bromer (1:51.06); Anton Ipsen (1:51.02); Daniel Skaaning (1:50.82)	7:21.53	
12	2	8	Switzerland	Jean-Baptiste Febo (1:50.33); David Karasek (1:51.45); Alexandre Haldemann (1:50.97); Nico van Duijn (1:51.65)	7:24.40	
13	1	5	Czech Republic	Jan Micka (1:52.53); Tomas Havranek (1:51.96); Martin Verner (1:52.63); David Kuncar (1:51.09)	7:28.21	
14	2	6	Ukraine	Anton Goncharov (1:51.41); Maksym Shemberev (1:54.30); Sergiy Frolov (1:51.57); Sergiy Varvaruk (1:52.63)	7:29.91	
15	1	6	Luxembourg	Pit Brandenburg (1:51.89); Jean-François Schneiders (1:52.93); Julien Henx (1:55.83); Raphaël Stacchiotti (1:52.34)	7:32.99	
16	1	4	Turkey	Doga Celik (1:56.93); Nezir Karap (1:53.69); Alpkan Ornek (1:52.74); Ediz Yildirimer (1:53.72)	7:37.08	

=== Final ===
The final was held at 17:43.

Rank	Lane	Nationality	Swimmers	Time	Notes
1st place, gold medalist(s)	4	Germany	Robin Backhaus (1:48.52); Yannick Lebherz (1:48.73); Clemens Rapp (1:46.80); Paul Biedermann (1:44.95)	7:09.00	
2nd place, silver medalist(s)	5	Russia	Artem Lobuzov (1:48.18); Dmitry Ermakov (1:47.90); Alexander Krasnykh (1:47.19); Alexander Sukhorukov (1:47.02)	7:10.29	
3rd place, bronze medalist(s)	7	Belgium	Louis Croenen (1:48.41); Glenn Surgeloose (1:48.56); Emmanuel Vanluchene (1:48.25); Pieter Timmers (1:45.17)	7:10.39	
4	1	France	Jérémy Stravius (1:47.62); Yannick Agnel (1:46.06); Lorys Bourelly (1:49.38); Clement Mignon (1:47.75)	7:10.81	
5	3	Netherlands	Dion Dreesens (1:48.10); Ferry Weertman (1:47.65); Joost Reijns (1:49.13); Sebastiaan Verschuren (1:46.71)	7:11.59	
6	6	Italy	Andrea Mitchell D'Arrigo (1:48.22); Damiano Lestingi (1:48.28); Gabriele Detti (1:48.62); Filippo Magnini (1:47.12)	7:12.24	
7	2	Spain	Albert Puig (1:49.36); Miguel Duran (1:48.08); Miguel Victor Martin (1:48.29); Eduardo Solaeche (1:50.07)	7:15.80	
8	8	Poland	Paweł Korzeniowski (1:47.40); Kacper Majchrzak (1:49.49); Jan Świtkowski (1:49.39); Dawid Zieliński (1:49.72)	7:16.00	
