= Florent Manaudou =

French swimmer (born 1990)

- Manaudou at the 2015 World Aquatics Championships in Kazan.

Personal information
- Full name: Florent Manaudou
- National team: France
- Born: 12 November 1990 (age 35) Villeurbanne, France
- Height: 1.99 m (6 ft 6 in)
- Weight: 99 kg (218 lb)

Sport
- Sport: Swimming
- Strokes: Freestyle, butterfly, backstroke
- Club: CN Marseille, Energy Standard, CN Antibes
Medal record
Men's swimming
Representing France
Event	1st	2nd	3rd
Olympic Games	1	3	2
World Championships (LC)	4	0	0
World Championships (SC)	4	3	2
European Championships (LC)	6	1	0
European Championships (SC)	5	3	2
Total	20	10	6
Olympic Games
Gold medal – first place	2012 London	50 m freestyle
Silver medal – second place	2016 Rio de Janeiro	50 m freestyle
Silver medal – second place	2016 Rio de Janeiro	4×100 m freestyle
Silver medal – second place	2020 Tokyo	50 m freestyle
Bronze medal – third place	2024 Paris	50 m freestyle
Bronze medal – third place	2024 Paris	4x100 m medley
World Championships (LC)
Gold medal – first place	2013 Barcelona	4×100 m freestyle
Gold medal – first place	2015 Kazan	50 m freestyle
Gold medal – first place	2015 Kazan	50 m butterfly
Gold medal – first place	2015 Kazan	4×100 m freestyle
World Championships (SC)
Gold medal – first place	2014 Doha	50 m freestyle
Gold medal – first place	2014 Doha	50 m backstroke
Gold medal – first place	2014 Doha	4×100 m freestyle
Gold medal – first place	2022 Melbourne	4×50 m mixed freestyle
Silver medal – second place	2012 Istanbul	50 m freestyle
Silver medal – second place	2014 Doha	100 m freestyle
Silver medal – second place	2014 Doha	4×50 m medley
Bronze medal – third place	2012 Istanbul	50 m breaststroke
Bronze medal – third place	2014 Doha	4×100 m medley
European Championships (LC)
Gold medal – first place	2014 Berlin	50 m freestyle
Gold medal – first place	2014 Berlin	100 m freestyle
Gold medal – first place	2014 Berlin	50 m butterfly
Gold medal – first place	2014 Berlin	4×100 m freestyle
Gold medal – first place	2016 London	50 m freestyle
Gold medal – first place	2016 London	4×100 m freestyle
Silver medal – second place	2016 London	4×100 m medley
European Championships (SC)
Gold medal – first place	2012 Chartres	50 m freestyle
Gold medal – first place	2012 Chartres	4×50 m freestyle
Gold medal – first place	2012 Chartres	4×50 m medley
Gold medal – first place	2012 Chartres	4×50 m mixed freestyle
Gold medal – first place	2012 Chartres	4×50 m mixed medley
Silver medal – second place	2019 Glasgow	50 m freestyle
Silver medal – second place	2023 Otopeni	50 m freestyle
Silver medal – second place	2023 Otopeni	4x50 m mixed medley
Bronze medal – third place	2019 Glasgow	4×50 m mixed freestyle
Bronze medal – third place	2023 Otopeni	4x50 m mixed freestyle

Olympics official video: Manaudou wins 50m freestyle Olympic gold in 2012

Florent Manaudou (French pronunciation: [flɔʁɑ̃ manodu]; born 12 November 1990) is a French former competitive swimmer, an Olympic champion, world champion, multiple-time world record holder, he is regarded as one of the greatest sprinters in history. He is younger brother of Laure Manaudou, a 2004 Olympic gold medalist in swimming.

== Personal life ==
Manaudou is the son of a French father and a Dutch mother. He first began swimming under the direction of his older brother, Nicolas, and later joined the swimming club of Marseilles, France. In 2007, he was the French junior champion in the 50-meter freestyle event. In 2009, he joined the French Army and is currently in an artillery regiment. In 2022, Manaudou transitioned to competing for CN Antibes after formerly swimming only for the CN Marseille (CNM) swim club. As of 2023, he continues to compete for CN Marseille in contests such as the Belgian Open Swimming Championships.

He and his sister, Laure, are the first siblings to both win Olympic gold medals in swimming.

For his performance in 2012, Manaudou was awarded the Knight of the French National Order of the Légion d'Honneur in recognition of his "eminent merits" in swimming.

In September 2021, Manaudou announced his engagement to his then-girlfriend, Danish swimmer and Olympic gold medalist Pernille Blume. The following month, Manaudou was present in the audience to support Blume as she competed in the dancing competition Vild med dans. Manaudou and Blume are no longer together, their relationship ending sometime before June 2024.

== Swimming career ==
=== 2011 World Championships ===
In his only individual event at the 2011 World Aquatics Championships in Shanghai, the 50-meter butterfly, Manaudou placed fifth in the final with a time of 23.49. It was slightly slower than the times he posted in the heats (23.31) and semifinals (23.32). Manaudou also competed in the heats of the 4×100-meter medley relay and as the butterfly leg, had a split of 54.02. The French team did not advance to the final with an overall time of 3:36.21.

=== 2012 Summer Olympics ===
2012 Summer Olympics
Gold medal – first place	50 m freestyle	21.34

At the French Olympic Trials, Manaudou qualified for the 2012 London Olympics in London by finishing second behind Amaury Leveaux in the 50-meter freestyle with a time of 21.95. Despite entering the Olympics with only the 10th fastest time in the men's 50-meter freestyle in the world that year, Manaudou won the gold medal in that event (which was the only event he entered). He thus became the first French gold-medalist of the men's 50-meter freestyle and the sixth French Olympic champion in an individual event. Swimming in lane 7 in the final, Manaudou had a time of 21.34 seconds, finishing ahead of second-place finisher Cullen Jones and third-place finisher César Cielo, the defending champion and world record holder, to win the gold medal. Manaudou's time was slightly slower than the Olympic record of 21.30 set by Cielo in 2008, but was an unofficial fastest time swam in textile (that is, not wearing a high-tech suit). Going into the final, Manaudou recorded a time of 22.09 in the heats and 21.80 in the semifinals.

=== 2012 Short Course Competitions ===
2012 World Short Course Championships
Silver medal – second place	50 m freestyle	20.88
Bronze medal – third place	50 m breaststroke	26.33

Following the Olympics, Manaudou competed at the 2012 European Short Course Championships and the 2012 World Short Course Championships held at the end of 2012. At the European Championships in Chartres, Manaudou won five gold medals including an individual title in the 50-meter freestyle with a time of 20.70. At the World Short Course Championships in Istanbul, Manaudou won one silver and bronze medal. In his specialty event, the 50-meter freestyle, Manaudou placed second behind Russian swimmer Vladimir Morozov (who he beat in Chartres) by three tenths of a second (0.33) with a time of 20.88.

=== 2013 World Championships ===
At the 2013 World Aquatics Championships in Barcelona, Manaudou won gold in the 4×100-meter freestyle relay with Yannick Agnel, Fabien Gilot, and Jérémy Stravius. Swimming the second leg, Manaudou recorded a time of 47.93 while the French team had an aggregated time of 3:11.18. In the 50-meter freestyle, Manaudou lead the heats and semifinals with times of 21.72 and 21.37. In the final however, he finished 5th with a time of 21.64. Manaudou also competed in the 50-meter butterfly and finished 8th with a time of 23.35.

=== 2014 ===
2014 World Short Course Championships
Gold medal – first place	50 m freestyle	20.26 (WR)
Gold medal – first place	50 m backstroke	22.22 (WR)
Gold medal – first place	4x100 m freestyle	3:03.78 (ER, CR)
Silver medal – second place	100 m freestyle	45.81
Silver medal – second place	4x50 m medley	1:31.25 (ER)
Bronze medal – third place	4x100 m medley	3:22.26

Manaudou won six medals at the 2014 World Short Course Championships (including three golds) and four gold medals at the 2014 European Aquatics Championships in Berlin. At the World Short Course Championships, Manaudou broke the first world records of his career in the 50-meter backstroke and freestyle.

=== 2015 ===
Manaudou won three gold medals at the 2015 World Aquatics Championships in Kazan, including the 50 m freestyle where he swam the fastest time ever in textile in 21.19.

=== 2016 Summer Olympics ===
2016 Summer Olympics
Silver medal – second place	50 m freestyle	21.41
Silver medal – second place	4x100 m freestyle	3:10.53

Manaudou failed in his bid to qualify for the 2016 Olympic Games 100m freestyle when he only finished third at the French national championships held on 1 April in Montpellier. He had been hoping to pull off a 50m-100m freestyle double at the 2016 Olympic Games in Rio de Janeiro but his time of 48.10sec was bettered by Jérémy Stravius (47.97) and Clement Mignon (48.01). Only the top two finishers would qualify for the 2016 Olympic Games. Manaudou, the reigning Olympic/World/European champion in the 50m freestyle, had been the second fastest over the 100m freestyle this season.

However, he qualified to represent France in the 50 m freestyle, where he won silver, and was part of the French 4 × 100 m freestyle team that also won silver.

=== 2019 International Swimming League ===
Manaudou swam with swim club Energy Standard as part of the inaugural season of the International Swimming League, co-captaining the team alongside Sarah Sjöström. He won races in freestyle, butterfly, and freestyle skins.

=== 2020 Summer Olympics ===
2020 Summer Olympics
Silver medal – second place	50 m freestyle	21.55

Manaudou qualified for the 50 metre freestyle at the 2020 Summer Olympics by winning the 50 metre freestyle at the FFN Golden Tour event 'Camille Muffat' in Marseille, France with a season-best time of 21.72 seconds. At the Olympic Games themselves, in Tokyo, Japan in 2021 due to the COVID-19 pandemic, he qualified second fastest from the prelims heats to the semifinals of the 50 metre freestyle with a time of 21.65 seconds. In the semifinals the next day, he lowered his time to 21.53 seconds, advancing to the final ranked second overall. In the final Manaudou won the silver medal ahead of bronze medalist Bruno Fratus of Brazil and behind gold medalist Caeleb Dressel of the United States with a time of 21.55 seconds, which marked the third-consecutive Olympic medal Manaudou had won in the 50 metre freestyle at the Olympic Games, after winning the gold medal in 2012 and the silver medal in 2016, then behind gold medalist Anthony Ervin of the United States. He also competed in the 4×100 metre freestyle relay where his relay team placed sixth in the final.

=== 2023 ===
At the 2023 Belgian Open Swimming Championships, held in April in Antwerp, Belgium, Manaudou won the gold medal in the 50 metre freestyle on day two with a 2023 World Aquatics Championships qualifying time of 21.98 seconds. The third and final day, he won a second gold medal, this time in the 50 metre butterfly with a World Championships qualifying time of 23.42 seconds. Two months later, he placed second in the 50 metre butterfly on the first day of the 2023 French Elite Swimming Championships in Rennes, finishing 0.38 seconds behind first-place finisher Maxime Grousset with a time of 23.44 seconds. Two days later, he achieved a time of 48.12 seconds in the preliminaries of the 100 metre freestyle to rank first before withdrawing from competing in the final. On day five, he won the gold medal and national title in the 50 metre freestyle with a 2023 World Aquatics Championships qualifying time of 21.62 seconds.

=== 2024 Summer Olympics ===
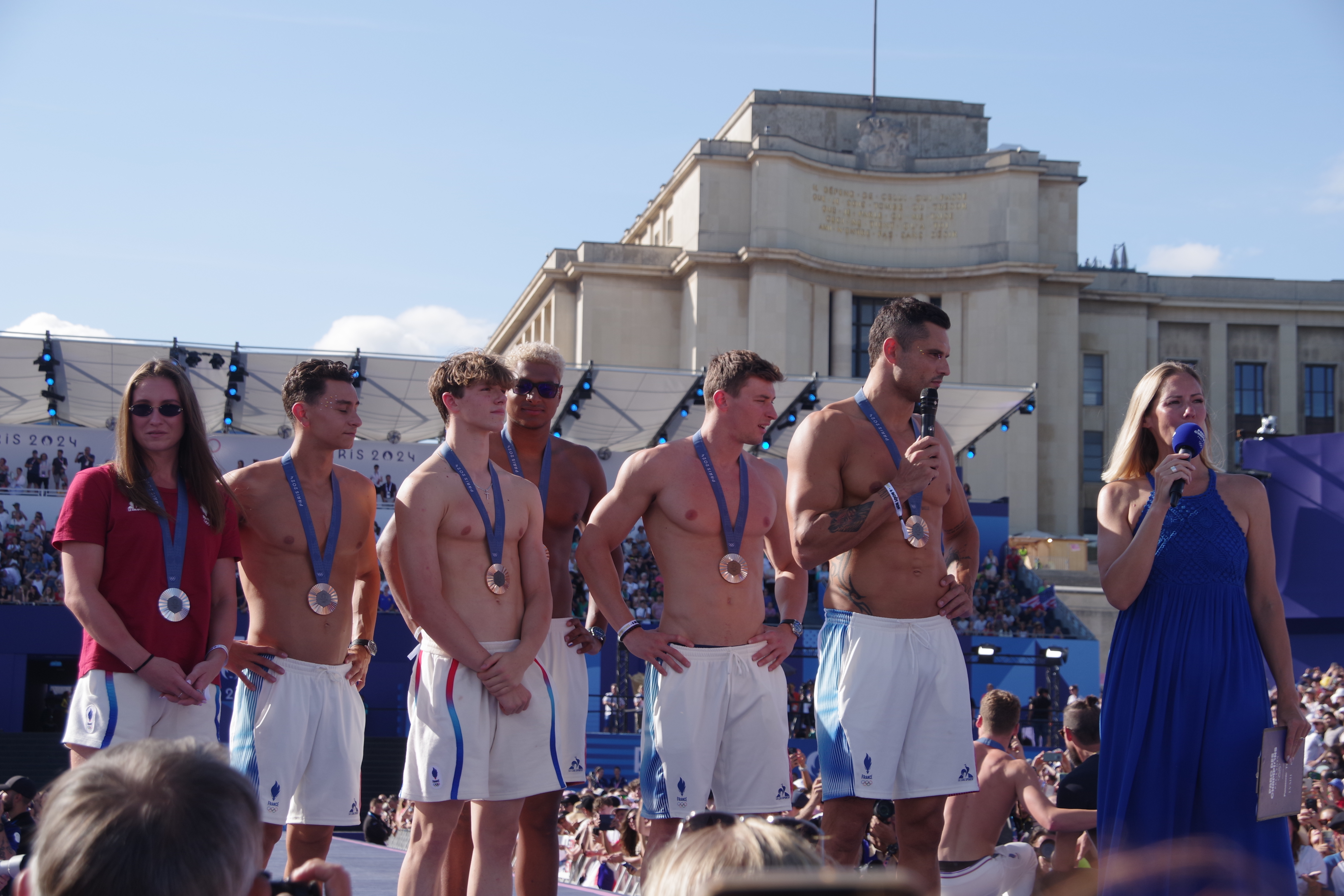
Manaudou at Parc des Champions

Manaudou was the Opening Ceremony flag bearer for France along with the discus thrower Melina Robert at the Paris 2024 Olympic Games.

He won two bronze medals: individually in the 50 freestyle and as part of the 4x-100 medley relay for France.

== Personal best times ==
As of 8 August 2015

Long course
Event	Time	Meet
50 m freestyle	21.19	2015 World Aquatics Championships
100 m freestyle	47.98	2014 European Championships
50 m backstroke	24.77	2015 French Elite and Junior Championships
50 m breaststroke	27.66	2014 French National Championships (50 m)
50 m butterfly	22.84 (=NR)	2015 World Aquatics Championships
100 m butterfly	53.94	2011 French National Championships (50 m)

Short course
Event	Time	Meet
50 m freestyle	20.26 (ER, Former WR)	2014 SC World Championships
100 m freestyle	45.04	2013 French SC Championships
50 m backstroke	22.22 (Former WR)	2014 SC World Championships
50 m breaststroke	26.11 (NR)	2014 French National Championships (25 m)
50 m butterfly	22.09 (NR)	2014 French National Championships (25 m)
100 m individual medley	50.96 (Former NR)	2013 French National Championships (25 m)

== Awards ==
- SwimSwam Top 100 (Men's): 2021 (#25), 2022 (#77)

== Television ==
Florent Manaudou has also appeared on TV series such as Vestiaires (France 2) and Munch (TF1).

In 2018, he appears on TV Series Section de recherches (TF1, season 12).

In 2025, Florent Manaudou is participating in the 14th season of the French television program "Danse avec les Stars" a show modeled after the international "Dancing with the Stars" format.

== See also ==
- List of world records in swimming
- List of European records in swimming
- List of French records in swimming
- World record progression 50 metres backstroke
- World record progression 50 metres freestyle
- Chronological summary of the 2012 Summer Olympics
- Chronological summary of the 2016 Summer Olympics
- Chronological summary of the 2020 Summer Olympics

Records
Preceded by (Japan) Shinri Shioura, Sayaka Akase, Kenta Ito, Kanako Watanabe	Mixed 4 × 50 metres freestyle relay world record-holder 21 October 2013 – 10 November 2013; With: Jérémy Stravius, Mélanie Henique, Anna Santamans	Succeeded by (Australia) Tomaso D'Orsogna, Regan Leong, Bronte Campbell, Cate Campbell
Preceded by (South Africa) Roland Schoeman	Men's 50 metre freestyle world record holder (short course); 5 December 2014 – 20 December 2019	Succeeded by (United States) Caeleb Dressel
Preceded by (United States) Peter Marshall	Men's 50 metre backstroke world record holder (short course); 6 December 2014 – present	Succeeded by Incumbent
Awards
Preceded by Renaud Lavillenie	French Sportsman of the Year; 2015	Succeeded by Teddy Riner

Olympic Games
Preceded by Clarisse Agbegnenou; Samir Aït Saïd	Flagbearer for France (with Mélina Robert-Michon); Paris 2024	Succeeded by Incumbent
