= 2014 FINA World Swimming Championships (25 m) – Men's 4 × 50 metre freestyle relay =

Men's 4 × 50 metre freestyle relay at the 2014 FINA World Swimming Championships (25 m)
- Dates: 6 December
- Competitors: 52 from 13 nations
- Winning time: 1:22.60

Medalists
gold medal	Vladimir Morozov; Evgeny Sedov; Oleg Tikhobaev; Sergey Fesikov	Russia
silver medal	Josh Schneider; Tom Shields; Jimmy Feigen; Ryan Lochte	United States
bronze medal	Luca Dotto; Marco Orsi; Filippo Magnini; Marco Belotti	Italy

The Men's 4 × 50 metre freestyle relay competition of the 2014 FINA World Swimming Championships (25 m) was held on 6 December.

== Records ==
Prior to the competition, the existing world and championship records were as follows.

	Nation	Time	Location	Date
World record	Russia	1:23.36	Herning	15 December 2013

The following records were established during the competition:

Date	Event	Nation	Time	Record
6 December	Final	Russia	1:22.60	WR

== Results ==
=== Heats ===
The heats were held at 09:30.

Rank	Heat	Lane	Nation	Swimmers	Time	Notes
1	2	1	Russia	Evgeny Sedov (20.70); Nikita Konovalov (21.26); Yevgeny Korotyshkin (21.65); Aleksandr Popkov (21.24)	1:24.85	Q
2	2	3	United States	Josh Schneider (21.87); Matt Grevers (21.02); Ryan Lochte (20.96); Darian Townsend (21.70)	1:25.55	Q
3	2	6	Italy	Luca Dotto (21.51); Filippo Magnini (21.44); Marco Orsi (20.78); Nicolangelo Di Fabio (21.88)	1:25.61	Q
4	1	2	Belgium	Jasper Aerents (21.70); Glenn Surgeloose (21.39); François Heersbrandt (22.28); Emmanuel Vanluchene (21.54)	1:26.91	Q
5	2	5	Japan	Yuki Kawachi (21.85); Reo Sakata (21.78); Yuki Kobori (22.39); Tsubasa Amai (22.67)	1:28.69	Q
6	1	3	China	Jiang Yuhui (22.98); Hou Mingda (22.25); Shi Yang (21.74); Lin Yongqing (21.84)	1:28.81	Q
7	2	0	Paraguay	Charles Hockin (22.90); Max Abreu (22.95); Renato Prono (23.52); Ben Hockin (21.88)	1:31.25	Q
8	1	4	Philippines	Jeremy Lim (23.92); Dhill Lee (23.51); Fahad Alkhaldi (23.54); Jessie Lacuna (23.36)	1:34.33	Q
9	2	7	Macau	Chao Man Hou (23.05); Sio Ka Kun (23.73); Yum Cheng Man (23.93); Wong Pok Lao (24.17)	1:34.88	
10	1	1	Lebanon	Adam Allouche (23.63); Maroun Waked (25.06); Charlie Salame (24.45); Mahmoud Daaboul (24.28)	1:37.42	
11	1	5	Gibraltar	Jim Sanderson (24.07); John Llanelo (25.46); Karl Pardo (26.06); Colin Bensadon (24.92)	1:40.51	
12	2	8	Papua New Guinea	Livingston Aika (25.31); Bobby Akunaii (26.44); Sheldon Plummer (27.16); Nathan Nades (25.92)	1:44.83	
13	1	8	Albania	Binald Mahmuti (26.73); Aleksander Ngresi (27.16); Deni Baholli (26.05); Klavio Meca (25.71)	1:45.65	
—	1	6	South Africa			DNS
—	1	7	Brazil			DNS
—	2	2	Algeria			DNS
—	2	4	Tajikistan			DNS

=== Final ===
The final was held at 18:00.

Rank	Lane	Nation	Swimmers	Time	Notes
1st place, gold medalist(s)	4	Russia	Vladimir Morozov (21.01); Evgeny Sedov (20.37); Oleg Tikhobaev (20.59); Sergey Fesikov (20.63)	1:22.60	WR
2nd place, silver medalist(s)	5	United States	Josh Schneider (21.05); Tom Shields (20.99); Jimmy Feigen (20.79); Ryan Lochte (20.64)	1:23.47	
3rd place, bronze medalist(s)	3	Italy	Luca Dotto (21.45); Marco Orsi (20.43); Filippo Magnini (21.35); Marco Belotti (21.33)	1:24.56	
4	6	Belgium	François Heersbrandt (21.26); Jasper Aerents (21.12); Emmanuel Vanluchene (21.35); Glenn Surgeloose (20.99)	1:24.72	
5	7	China	Yu Hexin (21.98); Hou Mingda (22.29); Shi Yang (21.58); Lin Yongqing (21.85)	1:27.70	
6	2	Japan	Yuki Kawachi (21.78); Reo Sakata (21.76); Yuki Kobori (22.22); Tsubasa Amai (22.69)	1:28.45	
7	1	Paraguay	Charles Hockin (22.84); Ben Hockin (21.51); Renato Prono (23.01); Max Abreu (23.18)	1:30.54	
8	8	Philippines	Jeremy Lim (23.75); Dhill Lee (23.28); Fahad Alkhaldi (23.07); Jessie Lacuna (23.02)	1:33.12	
