= Clemens Rapp =

German swimmer (born 1989)

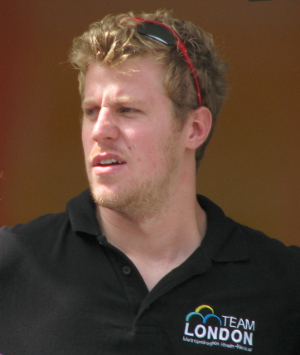
- Rapp in 2012

Personal information
- Full name: Clemens Andreas Rapp
- Born: 14 July 1989 (age 36) Weingarten, West Germany
- Height: 1.93 m (6 ft 4 in)
- Weight: 85 kg (187 lb)
- Website: Clemens-Rapp.de

Sport
- Sport: Swimming
- Club: TSV Bad Saulgau
Medal record
Men's swimming
Representing Germany
European Championships
Gold medal – first place	2012 Debrecen	4×200 m freestyle
Gold medal – first place	2014 Berlin	4x200 m freestyle
Silver medal – second place	2010 Budapest	4×200 m freestyle

Clemens Andreas Rapp (born 14 July 1989 in Weingarten) is a German swimmer. He competed at the 2012 Summer Olympics in the 200 m freestyle, finishing in 24th place in the heats, failing to qualify for the semifinals. His team was placed fourth in the 4 × 200 m freestyle relay.

He won a silver and a gold medal in the 4 × 200 m freestyle relay at the European championships in 2010 and 2012, respectively.

At the 2016 Summer Olympics in Rio de Janeiro, he competed in the 400 m freestyle, finishing 24th in the heats and failing to qualify for the semifinals. He also competed on the 4 × 200 m freestyle relay team which finished in 6th place.

He was born to Manfred and Doris Rapp and has a sister Magdalena and a brother Matthias.
