= Swimming at the 2014 European Aquatics Championships – Mixed 4 × 100 metre freestyle relay =

Mixed 4 × 100 metre freestyle relay at the Swimming at the 2014 European Aquatics Championships
- Dates: 22 August
- Competitors: 16 from 4 nations
- Winning time: 3:25.02

Medalists
gold medal	Luca Dotto; Luca Leonardi; Erika Ferraioli; Giada Galizi	Italy
silver medal	Andrey Grechin; Vladimir Morozov; Veronika Popova; Margarita Nesterova	Russia
bronze medal	Clement Mignon; Grégory Mallet; Anna Santamans; Coralie Balmy	France

The Mixed 4 × 100 metre freestyle relay competition of the 2014 European Aquatics Championships was held on 22 August.

== Results ==
=== Final ===
The final was held at 19:33.

Rank	Lane	Nationality	Swimmers	Time	Notes
1st place, gold medalist(s)	6	Italy	Luca Dotto (48.78); Luca Leonardi (48.01); Erika Ferraioli (53.83); Giada Galizi (54.40)	3:25.02	ER
2nd place, silver medalist(s)	3	Russia	Andrey Grechin (48.76); Vladimir Morozov (48.31); Veronika Popova (53.96); Margarita Nesterova (54.57)	3:25.60	
3rd place, bronze medalist(s)	4	France	Clément Mignon (48.89); Grégory Mallet (48.49); Anna Santamans (54.64); Coralie Balmy (55.00)	3:27.02	
4	5	Turkey	İskender Başlakov (50.24); Doğa Çelik (49.71); Gizem Bozkurt (56.31); Ezgi Yazıcı (59.53)	3:35.79	
