= Robin Backhaus (German swimmer) =

German swimmer (born 1989)

Personal information
- Born: 15 June 1989 (age 37) Berlin, Germany

Sport
- Sport: Swimming
- Club: SG Neukölln Berlin
Medal record
Men's swimming
Representing Germany
European Championships
Gold medal – first place	2014 Berlin	4x200 m freestyle
Silver medal – second place	2010 Budapest	4×200 m freestyle

Robin Backhaus (born 15 June 1989) is a German freestyle swimmer who won a silver medal at the 2010 European Aquatics Championships in the 4 × 200 m freestyle relay.
