= Alexandr Sukhorukov =

Russian swimmer

Personal information
- Full name: Alexandr Nikolayevich Sukhorukov
- National team: Russia
- Born: 22 February 1988 (age 38) Ukhta, Komi Republic, Russian SFSR, Soviet Union
- Height: 1.97 m (6 ft 6 in)
- Weight: 92 kg (203 lb)
- Spouse: Margarita Mamun (m. 2017)

Sport
- Sport: Swimming
- Strokes: Freestyle
Medal record
Men's swimming
Representing Russia
Olympic Games
Silver medal – second place	2008 Beijing	4×200 m freestyle
World Championships (LC)
Silver medal – second place	2009 Rome	4×100m freestyle
Silver medal – second place	2009 Rome	4×200m freestyle
Silver medal – second place	2013 Barcelona	4×200 m freestyle
Silver medal – second place	2015 Kazan	4×100 m freestyle
Bronze medal – third place	2013 Barcelona	4×100 m freestyle
World Championships (SC)
Gold medal – first place	2008 Manchester	4×100 m medley
Gold medal – first place	2010 Dubai	4×200 m freestyle
Silver medal – second place	2010 Dubai	4×100 m freestyle
European Championships (LC)
Gold medal – first place	2010 Budapest	4×100 m freestyle
Gold medal – first place	2010 Budapest	4×200 m freestyle
Silver medal – second place	2008 Eindhoven	4×200 m freestyle
Silver medal – second place	2014 Berlin	4×100 m freestyle
Silver medal – second place	2014 Berlin	4×200 m freestyle
Summer Universiade
Gold medal – first place	2013 Kazan	4×100 m freestyle
Gold medal – first place	2013 Kazan	4×200 m freestyle

Alexandr Nikolayevich Sukhorukov (Russian: Александр Николаевич Сухоруков, born 22 February 1988) is a Russian competitive swimmer who specializes in freestyle events. He competed in the 200 m freestyle and 4 × 200 m freestyle relay at the 2008 Olympics, the 4 × 200 m relay at the 2012 Olympics and the 4 × 100 m freestyle at the 2016 Olympics and won a silver medal in the relay in 2008.

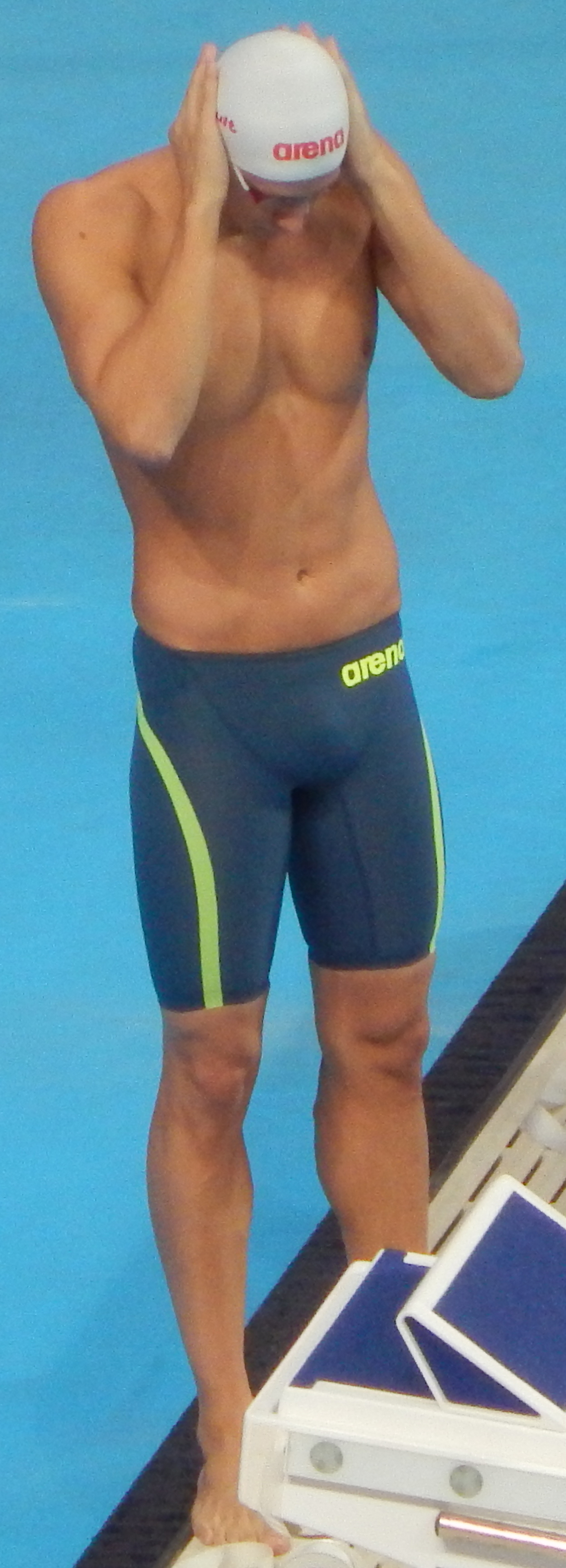
Sukhorukov in Kazan

== Early life and education ==
Sukhorukov learned swimming from his mother, Svetlana, a professional swimming coach, and started systematic training at age 14 under Oleg Litvinenko and Sergei Fyodorov. In 2004 he was selected for the national team. After graduating from the Ukhta Technical University he moved to Saint Petersburg.

== Personal life ==
In 2016, Sukhorukov became engaged to his girlfriend of three years, Olympic rhythmic gymnastics champion Margarita Mamun. They now have one son.
