= Vladimir Morozov (swimmer) =

Russian swimmer (born 1992)

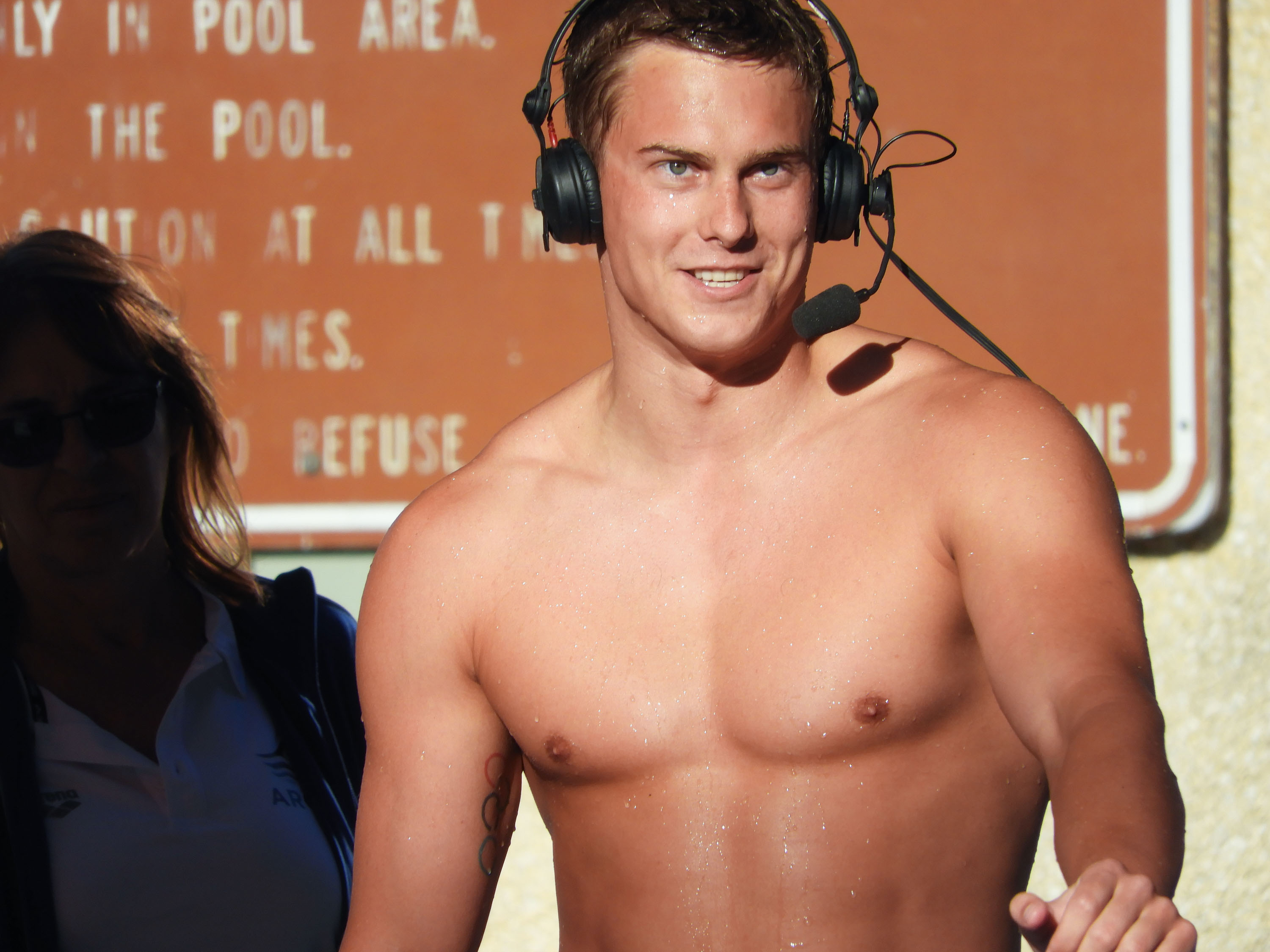

Personal information
- Full name: Vladimir Viktorovich Morozov
- Nickname: Vlad
- National team: Russia
- Born: 16 June 1992 (age 34) Novosibirsk, Russia
- Height: 1.85 m (6 ft 1 in)
- Weight: 85 kg (187 lb)

Sport
- Sport: Swimming
- Strokes: Freestyle, backstroke, breaststroke, butterfly, individual medley
- Club: Trojan Swim Club
- College team: University of Southern California (U.S.)
- Coach: Viktor Avdienko (in Russia)
Medal record
Men's swimming
Event	1st	2nd	3rd
Olympic Games	0	0	1
World Championships (LC)	0	3	3
World Championships (SC)	11	11	2
European Championships (LC)	2	4	1
European Championships (SC)	17	7	3
Total	30	25	10
Representing Russian Swimming Federation
World Championships (SC)
Gold medal – first place	2021 Abu Dhabi	4×100 m freestyle
Gold medal – first place	2021 Abu Dhabi	4×50 m medley
Silver medal – second place	2021 Abu Dhabi	4×50 m freestyle
Bronze medal – third place	2021 Abu Dhabi	4×50 m mixed freestyle
Representing Russia
Olympic Games
Bronze medal – third place	2012 London	4×100 m freestyle
World Championships (LC)
Silver medal – second place	2013 Barcelona	50 m freestyle
Silver medal – second place	2015 Kazan	4×100 m freestyle
Silver medal – second place	2019 Gwangju	4×100 m freestyle
Bronze medal – third place	2013 Barcelona	4×100 m freestyle
Bronze medal – third place	2017 Budapest	4×100 m medley
Bronze medal – third place	2019 Gwangju	4×100 m medley
World Championships (SC)
Gold medal – first place	2012 Istanbul	50 m freestyle
Gold medal – first place	2012 Istanbul	100 m freestyle
Gold medal – first place	2014 Doha	4×50 m freestyle
Gold medal – first place	2016 Windsor	4×50 m freestyle
Gold medal – first place	2016 Windsor	4×100 m freestyle
Gold medal – first place	2016 Windsor	4×50 m medley
Gold medal – first place	2016 Windsor	4×100 m medley
Gold medal – first place	2016 Windsor	4×50 m mixed freestyle
Gold medal – first place	2018 Hangzhou	50 m freestyle
Silver medal – second place	2012 Istanbul	4×100 m medley
Silver medal – second place	2014 Doha	100 m medley
Silver medal – second place	2014 Doha	4×100 m freestyle
Silver medal – second place	2014 Doha	4×50 m mixed free
Silver medal – second place	2016 Windsor	50 m freestyle
Silver medal – second place	2016 Windsor	100 m breaststroke
Silver medal – second place	2018 Hangzhou	100 m freestyle
Silver medal – second place	2018 Hangzhou	4×50 m freestyle
Silver medal – second place	2018 Hangzhou	4×100 m freestyle
Silver medal – second place	2018 Hangzhou	4×100 m medley
Bronze medal – third place	2018 Hangzhou	4×50 m mixed freestyle
European Championships
Gold medal – first place	2014 Berlin	50 m backstroke
Gold medal – first place	2018 Glasgow	4×100 m freestyle
Silver medal – second place	2014 Berlin	4×100 m freestyle
Silver medal – second place	2014 Berlin	4×100 m mixed freestyle
Silver medal – second place	2018 Glasgow	4×100 m medley
Silver medal – second place	2018 Glasgow	4×100 m mixed medley
Bronze medal – third place	2014 Berlin	4×100 m mixed medley
European Championships (SC)
Gold medal – first place	2012 Chartres	100 m freestyle
Gold medal – first place	2012 Chartres	100 m medley
Gold medal – first place	2013 Herning	50 m freestyle
Gold medal – first place	2013 Herning	100 m freestyle
Gold medal – first place	2013 Herning	100 m medley
Gold medal – first place	2013 Herning	4×50 m freestyle
Gold medal – first place	2013 Herning	4×50 m mixed freestyle
Gold medal – first place	2017 Copenhagen	50 m freestyle
Gold medal – first place	2017 Copenhagen	4×50 m freestyle
Gold medal – first place	2017 Copenhagen	4×50 m medley
Gold medal – first place	2019 Glasgow	50 m freestyle
Gold medal – first place	2019 Glasgow	50 m breaststroke
Gold medal – first place	2019 Glasgow	100 m freestyle
Gold medal – first place	2019 Glasgow	4×50 m freestyle
Gold medal – first place	2019 Glasgow	4×50 m medley
Gold medal – first place	2019 Glasgow	4×50 m mixed freestyle
Gold medal – first place	2019 Glasgow	4×50 m mixed medley
Silver medal – second place	2012 Chartres	50 m freestyle
Silver medal – second place	2012 Chartres	4×50 m freestyle
Silver medal – second place	2012 Chartres	4×50 m medley
Silver medal – second place	2012 Chartres	4×50 m mixed freestyle
Silver medal – second place	2017 Copenhagen	4×50 m mixed freestyle
Silver medal – second place	2021 Kazan	4×50 m medley
Bronze medal – third place	2012 Chartres	50 m backstroke
Bronze medal – third place	2021 Kazan	50 m freestyle
Bronze medal – third place	2021 Kazan	4×50 m freestyle
Summer Universiade
Gold medal – first place	2013 Kazan	50 m freestyle
Gold medal – first place	2013 Kazan	100 m freestyle
Gold medal – first place	2013 Kazan	4×100 m freestyle
Gold medal – first place	2013 Kazan	4×100 m medley
Silver medal – second place	2013 Kazan	50 m backstroke
Bronze medal – third place	2013 Kazan	50 m breaststroke

Vladimir Viktorovich Morozov (Russian: Владимир Викторович Морозов; born 16 June 1992) is a retired Russian competitive swimmer and Olympic medalist. He is the former world record holder in the short course 100-metre individual medley, the current, World Cup record and Russian national record holder in the 100-metre individual medley and 100-metre freestyle (short course), and Russian record holder in the 50-metre freestyle (short course and long course). He also holds the European record for the 100-metre individual medley. Formerly he held the Russian national record in the 50-metre backstroke (long course) and the 50-metre butterfly (short course), and held the European and Russian records in the 50-metre breaststroke (short course).

In 2013, Morozov became the first person to swim faster than 18.00 seconds for 50 yards of freestyle on a relay in the NCAA with a time of 17.86 seconds. Over the course of his career, he has won 176 medals, including 123 gold medals, at Swimming World Cup circuits.

== Background ==
Morozov was born 16 June 1992 in Russia, and emigrated to the United States as a 14-year-old. His parents divorced when he was one year old. As of 2018 he had not met his father. When he was nine years old, Morozov began his competitive swimming career. He won the first medal of his swimming career, a bronze medal, in the 200 metre backstroke when he was in the 9 to 10 year old age group, and one of the sports he has participated in outside of swimming is Olympic weightlifting. Once arriving in the United States, he attended Torrance High School in Torrance, California, graduating in 2010.

As a student at the University of Southern California, Morozov started competing collegiately and studying economics in pursuit of an undergraduate degree in 2010. In 2013, he left the University of Southern California to become a professional swimmer without graduating with his degree and in 2018 he expressed he was still interested in one day finishing his degree.

In November 2021, Morozov got married. His wife is Evgeniia Bulatova (Morozova), a PR Manager and model in Los Angeles. They met at the University of Southern California in 2018, where she was getting a B.A. degree and Vladimir kept training in a team with Dave Salo.

== Career ==
=== 2012 Summer Olympics ===
2012 Summer Olympics
Bronze medal – third place	4x100 m freestyle relay	3:11.41

At the 2012 Summer Olympics in London, England, Morozov was as a member of the Russian 4x100-metre freestyle relay team, that placed third behind the relay teams from France and the United States and won the bronze medal in the event. Swimming the third leg of the relay, Morozov split a time of 47.85 seconds to help the relay finish in 3:11.41.

=== 2012 World and European Championships ===
Following the Olympics, Morozov competed at the 2012 European Short Course Championships and the 2012 World Short Course Championships held at the end of 2012. At the European Championships in Chartres, France, Morozov won seven medals including individual titles in the 100-metre freestyle and 100-metre individual medley. At the World Championships in Istanbul, Morozov won gold medals in the 50-metre and 100-metre freestyle, and a silver medal in the 4x100-metre medley relay. In the 50-metre freestyle, Morozov defeated 2012 Olympic champion in the event, Florent Manaudou of France, as well as Anthony Ervin of the United States, and set the national record with a time of 20.55 seconds.

=== 2013 NCAA and Championships ===
In March 2013, as a college junior, third year, and 20-year-old swimming for Coach Dave Salo at University of Southern California, Morozov won the NCAA Division I Championships title in both the 50-yard freestyle and 100-yard freestyle. Also as part of the 2013 NCAA Championships, Morozov split a 17.86 on a freestyle leg of a relay and became the first person to swim 50 yards of freestyle in less than 18.00 seconds on a relay in the history of the NCAA. Following the end of his junior year, Morozov became a professional swimmer and stopped competing collegiately.

Fresh off his success at the NCAA Championships, Morozov competed at the 2013 Russian National Championships, breaking the Russian record in the long course 50-metre backstroke with a time of 24.80 seconds. Later in the year at the 2013 World Aquatics Championships in Barcelona, Spain, he set a new Russian national record in the long course 50-metre freestyle with a time of 21.47 seconds and earned the silver medal in the event, finishing less than two tenths of a second behind César Cielo.

=== 2014 ===
The following year, at the 2014 Russian National Championships, Morozov lowered his national record in the 50-metre backstroke to a 24.52, dropping almost three tenths of a second off from his previous record and best time of 24.80 seconds.

=== 2016 Summer Olympics ===
At the 2016 Summer Olympics in Rio de Janeiro, Brazil, Morozov did not qualify for the final in either of his individuals events, the 50-metre freestyle and the 100-metre freestyle, finishing 9th and 10th respectively. Morozov also competed on the Russian 4×100-metre freestyle relay, splitting a time of 47.31 for the third leg of the relay in the final and helping the relay team place fourth in 3:11.64. In the final of the 4×100-metre medley relay Morozov contributed to the Russia relay team finishing in a time of 3:31.30 to place fourth.

=== 2016 Swimming World Cup ===
Starting out at the first short course 2016 FINA Swimming World Cup stop in Chartres, France, Morozov broke the world record in the 100-metre individual medley set at 50.66 by Markus Deibler of Germany in 2014 with his time of 50.60 seconds. Later on in the World Cup circuit, four days later at the stop in Berlin, Germany, Morozov broke his own world record with a time of 50.30 seconds in the 100-metre individual medley.

=== 2016 World Short Course Championships ===
2016 World Championships
Gold medal – first place	4×100 m freestyle	3:05.90
Gold medal – first place	4×50 m mixed freestyle	1:29.73
Gold medal – first place	4×50 m freestyle	1:24.32
Gold medal – first place	4×50 m medley	1:31.52
Gold medal – first place	4×100 m medley	3:21.17
Silver medal – second place	100 m breaststroke	57.00
Silver medal – second place	50 m freestyle	21.14

On the first day of competition at the 2016 World Short Course Championships in Windsor, Canada, Morozov won a gold medal in the 4×100-metre freestyle relay with a final relay time of 3:05.90, swimming the fastest split out of all 32 swimmers in the final with a 45.42 for the third leg of the relay. The second day, he won the silver medal in the 100-metre breaststroke with a 57.00, finishing 0.23 seconds behind first-place finisher Marco Koch of Germany and 0.04 seconds ahead of third-place finisher Fabio Scozzoli of Italy. Later in the same finals session, he split a 20.44 for the second leg of the 4×50-metre mixed freestyle relay to help win the gold medal in 1:29.73. In the final of the 4×50-metre freestyle relay on day four, Morozov swam a 20.71 for the anchor leg to help win the gold medal with a time of 1:24.32 and was only out-split amongst relay anchor leg swimmers by Tom Shields of the United States who split a 20.58. Approximately 15 minutes later, Morozov placed sixth in the final of the 100-metre individual medley with a 52.83, which was 0.99 seconds slower than the gold medalist in the event Michael Andrew of the United States. Less than an hour later, Morozov earned his second silver medal in an individual event at the Championships, this time finishing second in the 50-metre freestyle at 21.14 seconds, which was 0.04 seconds behind first-place finisher Jesse Puts of the Netherlands.

In the morning of day five, Morozov placed 18th in the prelims heats of the 100-metre freestyle with a 47.82 and did not advance to the semifinals stage of competition. For the day's finals sessions, he won a gold medal in the 4×50-metre medley relay swimming the fastest freestyle leg out of all the finals relays with a time of 20.46 to help achieve the final time of 1:31.52. On the sixth and final day of competition, Morozov was the only swimmer to split faster than 46.00 seconds for the freestyle leg of the 4×100-metre medley relay, splitting a 45.58, and helped achieved a gold medal win in a time of 3:21.17.

=== 2017 Championships and World Cup ===
In April, at the 2017 Russian National Championships conducted in long course metres, Morozov broke the 50-metre freestyle national record he set in 2013 by swimming a 21.44 and lowering the record three hundredths of a second. During the 2017 FINA Swimming World Cup stop in Berlin in August, Morozov swam a 45.23 and broke the 100-metre freestyle Russian national record from eight years prior set at 45.36 by Yevgeny Lagunov. At the 2017 European Short Course Swimming Championships in Copenhagen, Denmark in December, Morozov set a new Russian national record in the 50-metre freestyle twice, swimming a time of 20.31 seconds and winning the gold medal in the event final after first lowering the national record to 20.45 seconds in the semifinals.

=== 2018 National Championships ===
At the 2018 Russian National Championships in Moscow in April, Morozov broke his own Russian national record in the 50-metre backstroke, swimming a 24.35 for the new record and lowering his personal best time in the event by over one tenth of a second.

=== 2018 Swimming World Cup ===
Morozov broke a number of short course records during the 2018 FINA Swimming World Cup, starting by setting a new world record, European record, and Russian national record in the 100-metre individual medley with a time of 50.26 seconds at the Eindhoven stop in late September. In early November at the World Cup stop in Tokyo, Morozov swam 50.26 seconds in the 100-metre individual medley again, tying his own pre-existing records. In Tokyo the following day, he set a new Russian national record in the 100-metre freestyle with a personal best time of 45.16 seconds that lowered his former national record from 2017 by seven hundredths of a second. At the World Cup stop in Singapore in mid-November, Morozov achieved the textile world record, World Cup record, and Russian record in the short course 100-metre freestyle, posting a time of 44.95 seconds, which was 0.01 seconds slower than the world record set in a full body-suit at 44.94 seconds by Amaury Leveaux of France in 2008, and becoming the second fastest swimmer in the event in history only behind Leveaux. The next day, Morozov set a new national record in the 50-metre butterfly with his time of 22.17 seconds, which was just 15 hundredths of a second ahead of Michael Andrew of the United States who placed second.

=== 2019 Swimming World Cup ===
At the long course 2019 FINA Swimming World Cup series stop in Singapore, Morozov lowered the Russian record in the 50-metre freestyle by almost two tenths of a second to 21.27 seconds and tied Bruno Fratus of Brazil as the tenth fastest performer in the race to that point in time.

=== 2019 European Championships ===
2019 European Championships
Gold medal – first place	50 m breaststroke	25.51 (ER, CR)
Gold medal – first place	4×50 m freestyle	1:22.92
Gold medal – first place	4×50 m mixed medley	1:36.22 (WR)
Gold medal – first place	50 m freestyle	20.40
Gold medal – first place	4×50 m mixed freestyle	1:28.31 (ER, CR)
Gold medal – first place	100 m freestyle	45.53
Gold medal – first place	4×50 m medley	1:30.63

Following the 2019 World Cup, Morozov competed at the 2019 European Short Course Swimming Championships, held at Tollcross International Swimming Centre in Glasgow, Scotland, and won seven gold medals. In the 50-metre breaststroke, his first event of the Championships, Morozov won the gold medal and set new European, Russian national, and Championships records with his time of 25.51 seconds. Less than 15 minutes later, he won a second gold medal, this time in the 4×50-metre freestyle relay where he split a 20.25 for the anchor leg of the relay to help achieve a final time of 1:22.92. The second day of competition, Morozov split a 25.40 for the breaststroke leg of the 4×50-metre mixed medley relay, contributing to winning the gold medal and setting a new world record and Championships record of 1:36.22. In his fourth event of the Championships, Morozov won the 50-metre freestyle with a time of 20.40 seconds, finishing 0.26 seconds ahead of the silver medalist in the event, Florent Manaudou of France.

On the fourth day of competition, Morozov won his fifth gold medal of the Championships, helping set new European and Championships records in the 4×50-metre mixed freestyle relay at 1:28.31 by splitting a 20.65 for the lead-off leg of the relay. He won the gold medal in his sixth of seven events, swimming a 45.53 in the final of the 100-metre freestyle to finish over three-tenths of a second ahead of the second-place finisher, Alessandro Miressi of Italy. For his seventh and final event, Morozov helped win the gold medal in the 4×50-metre medley relay with a final time of 1:30.63, swimming a 25.53 for the breaststroke leg of the relay.

=== 2019—2020 International Swimming League ===
In 2019, Morozov was a member of the 2019 International Swimming League, in which he swam representing Team Iron. He was named Most Valuable Player in the Lewisville match and he also won the skins race twice in the first season at the matches in Lewisville and London. For the 2020 season, Morozov joined the newly established team, Tokyo Frog Kings.

=== 2020 Summer Olympics ===
For the time spanning 17 December 2020 through 16 December 2022, Russians, including Morozov, were not allowed to compete using their country name, anthem, nor flag at World Championships, including Olympic Games, due to a ban originating as a reaction to widespread doping in Russia and enacted by the Court of Arbitration for Sport. They had their outfits, national song, and name, Russian Olympic Committee, determined for them by the International Olympic Committee.

In July and August 2021 at the 2020 Summer Olympics in Tokyo, Japan, which were postponed to 2021 due to the COVID-19 pandemic, Morozov competed in both the prelims and the final of the 4x100 metre freestyle relay, helping the relay qualify for the final ranked eighth with a time of 3:13.13 and place seventh in the final with a time of 3:12.20, as well as the 50 metre freestyle where he placed 16th overall in the semifinals with a time of 22.25 seconds and did not advance to the final of the event. In August, following the Olympic Games, Morozov contracted COVID-19.

=== 2021 Swimming World Cup ===
==== Stop 1: Berlin ====
2021 World Cup — Berlin
Bronze medal – third place	50 m freestyle	21.15

On the first day of the short course 2021 FINA Swimming World Cup stop number one in Berlin, Germany, Morozov tied for sixth place in the prelims heat of the 50-metre freestyle and qualified for the final later the same day. In the final, he tied Jesse Puts of the Netherlands for the bronze medal with a time of 21.15 seconds. The next day, Morozov competed in the 50-metre breaststroke, swimming a 27.12 and placing ninth overall. Day three, the final day of competition, he placed seventh in the prelims heats of the 50-metre butterfly with a time of 23.28 seconds and qualified for the final in the evening. Morozov placed fourth in the final, finishing less than three tenths of a second behind bronze medalist in the event Chad le Clos of South Africa with a time of 22.73 seconds.

==== Stop 2: Budapest ====
2021 World Cup — Budapest
Silver medal – second place	50 m freestyle	21.04
Silver medal – second place	100 m freestyle	46.25
Bronze medal – third place	50 m butterfly	22.52

Stop number two of the World Cup series, held in Budapest, Hungary, Morozov started his competition on day one, swimming a 21.51 in the 50-metre freestyle prelims in the morning and advancing to the final in the evening. He won his first medal in the final, finishing in 21.04 seconds, and less than one tenth of a second behind Kyle Chalmers of Australia, to win the silver medal. Day two of competition, Morozov ranked third in the 100-metre freestyle prelims heats at 47.41 seconds and advanced to the final. In the final he finished second, over half a second behind Kyle Chalmers and over half a second ahead of Kristóf Milák of Hungary, in a time of 46.25 seconds and won his second silver medal of the stop. On the third and final day of competition, Morozov placed ninth and achieved alternate status for the final of the 50-metre butterfly with a time of 23.30 seconds in the prelims heats. His alternate status was called upon and he was able to compete in the final where he won his third medal of the stop, this time a bronze medal, in a time of 22.52 seconds only behind Tom Shields of the United States and Szebasztián Szabó of Hungary.

==== Stop 3: Doha ====
2021 World Cup — Doha
Gold medal – first place	50 m freestyle	20.89
Silver medal – second place	100 m freestyle	46.31

Prior to the start of competition at the third World Cup stop, which was held in Doha, Qatar for the year, Morozov was mentioned as an athlete to watch during the stop by Swimming World. Building repetition into his World Cup stop entries, Morozov chose to go with the honed entry list of events, 50-metre freestyle, 100-metre freestyle and 50-metre butterfly, he swam in Budapest for Doha. Beginning his competition, Morozov ranked third in the morning prelims heats of the 50-metre freestyle on day one, qualifying for the final as one of three swimmers under 22 seconds with his time of 21.87 seconds. Morozov won his first gold medal of the 2021 World Cup circuit in the final of the 50-metre freestyle, finishing first with a time of 20.89. In the morning prelims on day two, Morozov ranked fourth overall with a time of 47.56 in the 100-metre freestyle, just one hundredth of a second behind Kyle Chalmers heading into the final. He cruised to winning a silver medal in a time of 46.31 seconds in the final, finishing only after Kyle Chalmers. Starting the last day of competition at the Doha stop, Morozov ranked eighth in the prelims heats of the 50-metre butterfly with a time of 23.67 and qualified for the final later the same day. Finishing the day off, he placed fourth in the final of the 50-metre butterfly with a time of 22.76 seconds.

==== Stop 4: Kazan ====
2021 World Cup — Kazan
Silver medal – second place	50 m freestyle	20.81
Silver medal – second place	100 m freestyle	46.32

Morozov was mentioned as a competitor to watch in his freestyle races against Kyle Chalmers by FINA in advance of the start of competition at the Kazan Aquatics Palace in Kazan for the fourth and final stop of the year's World Cup circuit. Participating in a FINA-hosted press conference, Morozov spoke about fitness, performance, and racing Kyle Chalmers in regards to the last stop:

First of all, my main goal is to keep fit, and my paramount goal is to try qualify for the World Championships. In August, I had COVID, and my fit was zero. Then I got recovered and started to train hard. I guess I am not in the best shape now, as for the previous leg it was 7 out of 10. So maybe in Kazan I will try to beat Chalmers.

Making good on his promise to try to beat Kyle Chalmers, Morozov ranked third overall in the prelims heats of the 50-metre freestyle with a time of 21.25 seconds that was just one tenth of a second behind Kyle Chalmers, who ranked first in the heats, and both advanced to the final later in the day. In the medal determining finals race for the event, Morozov swam his fastest time in the 50-metre freestyle for the 2021 World Cup circuit, a 20.81, and finished just thirteen hundredths of a second after Kyle Chalmers for the silver medal. Morozov kept pace in the prelims heats of the 100-metre freestyle in the morning of day two of competition, advancing to the final ranking fourth with his time of 47.07 seconds from the morning. In the final of the 100-metre freestyle, Morozov won the silver medal with a time of 46.32 seconds and finished second to Kyle Chalmers who set a new world record in the event, a feat Morozov had narrowly missed a few years earlier when he swam within one hundredth of a second of the world record. Starting off the last day of the World Cup, Morozov tied for fourth in the prelims heats of the 50-metre butterfly with a time 22.87 seconds that was six-hundredths of a second faster than Kyle Chalmers who ranked sixth. Morozov finished off the podium in the final, coming in fifth-place and thirty-five hundredths of a second behind Kyle Chalmers who won the bronze medal.

In terms of overall points scored from all 2021 World Cup stops by a male competitor, Morozov took first-place amongst Russian swimmers, third-place amongst the competitors whose country hosted at least one of the year's World Cup stops, and ninth-place for competitors from any country. In terms of total medals won, Morozov ranked tenth amongst male competitors with his total of eight medals, one of which was gold, five of which were silver, and two of which were bronze.

=== 2021 European Championships ===
2021 European Championships
Silver medal – second place	4x50 m medley relay	1:30.79
Bronze medal – third place	50 m freestyle	20.95
Bronze medal – third place	4x50 m freestyle relay	1:23.35

For the 2021 European Short Course Swimming Championships held in Kazan from 2 to 7 November, Morozov entered to compete in three events, the 50-metre freestyle, the 100-metre freestyle, and the 100-metre individual medley. The day before the start of competition, an updated entries list revealed Morozov had pulled out of racing the 100-metre individual medley at the Championships. His first race, the final of the 4x50-metre freestyle relay on day one of competition, Morozov led-off the relay with a split time of 21.22 seconds and helped the relay win the bronze medal with a time of 1:23.35. On the second day, Morozov competed in his first individual race, swimming a 21.23 in the prelims heats of the 50-metre freestyle and qualifying for the semifinals. In the semifinals of the 50-metre freestyle, Morozov lowered his time from the prelims by a quarter of a second, swimming a 20.98 and advancing to the final ranked third. In the final of the 4x50-metre medley relay the same day, Morozov split a 22.18 for the butterfly leg of the relay, helping the finals relay achieve a time of 1:30.79 and win the silver medal. The third day of competition, he swam a 20.95 in the final of the 50-metre freestyle and won a bronze medal in the event.

Day number five, 6 November, Morozov swam a 46.75 in the prelims heats of the 100-metre freestyle, ranked eighth overall, and did not advance to the semifinals as he ranked fourth amongst Russian swimmers in the prelims heats and each country was limited to two swimmers past the prelims heats. Later in the day, he split a 21.30 for the first leg of the 4x50-metre mixed freestyle relay in the final, helping the relay achieve a time of 1:29.40 and earn a silver medal. After Russia won the silver medal, the relay team who touched the wall fourth, the team from Poland, protested Russia winning a medal, so LEN decided to disqualify Morozov and the rest of the 4x50-metre mixed freestyle relay team from Russia and strip them of the medals they had already received and give the Poland relay team bronze medals for their efforts as the Russian swimmers did not swim in the order submitted to officials before the race.

=== 2021 World Short Course Championships ===
2021 World Championships
Gold medal – first place	4×100 m freestyle	3:03.45
Gold medal – first place	4×50 m medley	1:30.51 (CR)
Silver medal – second place	4×50 m freestyle	1:23.75
Bronze medal – third place	4×50 m mixed freestyle	1:28.97

On 2 December Morozov was officially announced to the Russia team roster for the 2021 World Short Course Championships to be held at Etihad Arena in Abu Dhabi, United Arab Emirates starting on 16 December. Due to the ongoing Court of Arbitration for Sport ban, he and his fellow Russians were required to compete using the FINA-determined name Russian Swimming Federation.

Day one of competition, Morozov won a gold medal in the 4×100 metre freestyle relay for his contributions alongside prelims relay teammates Andrei Minakov, Aleksandr Shchegolev, and Daniil Markov when the finals relay, which did not include Morozov, finished first. The second day of competition, he led-off the 4×50 metre mixed freestyle relay in the final with a 21.17, helping achieve a bronze medal-winning time of 1:28.97. In the prelims heats of the 50 metre freestyle on day three, he did not qualify for the semifinals, ranking 17th with a time of 21.54 seconds. Morozov led-off the 4×50 metre freestyle relay in the prelims heats on day four with a 21.33, helping qualify the relay for the final tied for first in rank. In the final, he split a 20.61 for the second leg of the relay, which tied Alessandro Miressi of Italy for the second-fastest split in the final of the event and contributed to a silver-medal-win and a final relay time of 1:23.75. On day five, he split a 20.37 for the freestyle leg of the 4×50-meter medley relay in the final, contributing to a Championships record and gold medal-winning time of 1:30.51.

=== 2022–2023: Twice banned for being Russian ===
On 21 April 2022, the world governing body for aquatic sports, FINA, banned Morozov and all of his fellow countrymen and countrywomen, as well as all Belarusians, for at least the remainder of the 2022 from any of their competitions or other events. Leading up to this global ban of Belarusians and Russians, the European aquatic sport governing body, LEN, permanently shut the same nationals out of their competitions starting 3 March 2022 and opted not to provide an end date for the ban. His, and all other Russians's, times following ban implementation and through the end of the year did not count towards world records nor world rankings, no matter what competition they were achieved at. On 5 April 2023, World Aquatics announced, "The World Aquatics Bureau's decision to not invite athletes and officials from Russia and Belarus to World Aquatics events remains in effect today. On April 19th, 2024, Morozov officially announced his retirement from competitive swimming during an interview with Match TV."

== International championships (50 m) ==
Meet	50 free	100 free	50 back	100 back	50 breast	4×100 free	4×100 medley	4×100 mixed free	4×100 mixed medley
WC 2011						5th^{[a]}		—N/a	—N/a
OG 2012			—N/a	10th (h)	—N/a	3rd place, bronze medalist(s)	12th	—N/a	—N/a
WUG 2013	1st place, gold medalist(s)	1st place, gold medalist(s)	2nd place, silver medalist(s)		3rd place, bronze medalist(s)	1st place, gold medalist(s)	1st place, gold medalist(s)	—N/a	—N/a
WC 2013	2nd place, silver medalist(s)	5th				3rd place, bronze medalist(s)	4th	—N/a	—N/a
EC 2014	12th (h)	10th (h)	1st place, gold medalist(s)			2nd place, silver medalist(s)	5th	2nd place, silver medalist(s)	3rd place, bronze medalist(s)
WC 2015	4th	DSQ	5th			2nd place, silver medalist(s)	5th	4th	5th
OG 2016	10th	9th	—N/a		—N/a	4th	4th	—N/a	—N/a
WC 2017	4th	24th				4th	3rd place, bronze medalist(s)		
EC 2018	4th	5th (h)	4th			1st place, gold medalist(s)	2nd place, silver medalist(s)		2nd place, silver medalist(s)
WC 2019	4th	24th				2nd place, silver medalist(s)	3rd place, bronze medalist(s)	5th	
OG 2020	16th		—N/a		—N/a	7th		—N/a	

^{a} Morozov swam only in the preliminary heats.

== International championships (25 m) ==
Meet	50 free	100 free	50 back	50 breast	100 breast	50 fly	100 medley	4×50 free	4×100 free	4×50 medley	4×100 medley	4×50 mixed free	4×50 mixed medley
ESC 2012	2nd place, silver medalist(s)	1st place, gold medalist(s)	3rd place, bronze medalist(s)			3rd (h)	1st place, gold medalist(s)	2nd place, silver medalist(s)	—N/a	2nd place, silver medalist(s)	—N/a	2nd place, silver medalist(s)	11th
WC 2012	1st place, gold medalist(s)	1st place, gold medalist(s)					DNS	—N/a	4th	—N/a	2nd place, silver medalist(s)	—N/a	—N/a
ESC 2013	1st place, gold medalist(s)	1st place, gold medalist(s)					1st place, gold medalist(s)	1st place, gold medalist(s)	—N/a	DSQ	—N/a	1st place, gold medalist(s)	DSQ
WC 2014	4th						2nd place, silver medalist(s)	1st place, gold medalist(s)	2nd place, silver medalist(s)	4th	4th	2nd place, silver medalist(s)	
WC 2016	2nd place, silver medalist(s)	18th			2nd place, silver medalist(s)		6th	1st place, gold medalist(s)	1st place, gold medalist(s)	1st place, gold medalist(s)	1st place, gold medalist(s)	1st place, gold medalist(s)	
ESC 2017	1st place, gold medalist(s)						DNS	1st place, gold medalist(s)	—N/a	1st place, gold medalist(s)	—N/a	2nd place, silver medalist(s)	
WC 2018	1st place, gold medalist(s)	2nd place, silver medalist(s)						2nd place, silver medalist(s)	2nd place, silver medalist(s)		2nd place, silver medalist(s)	3rd place, bronze medalist(s)	
ESC 2019	1st place, gold medalist(s)	1st place, gold medalist(s)		1st place, gold medalist(s)				1st place, gold medalist(s)	—N/a	1st place, gold medalist(s)	—N/a	1st place, gold medalist(s)	1st place, gold medalist(s)
ESC 2021	3rd place, bronze medalist(s)	8th (h)						3rd place, bronze medalist(s)	—N/a	2nd place, silver medalist(s)	—N/a	DSQ	
WC 2021	17th							2nd place, silver medalist(s)	(gold) ^{[a]}	1st place, gold medalist(s)		3rd place, bronze medalist(s)	

^{a} Morozov swam only in the preliminary heats.

== Personal best times ==
=== Long course metres (50 m pool) ===
As of 11 October 2021

Event	Time	Meet	Location	Date	Notes
50 m freestyle	21.27	2019 FINA Swimming World Cup	Singapore	15 August 2019	NR
100 m freestyle	47.62	2013 Summer Universiade	Kazan	28 July 2013	
50 m backstroke	24.29	2018 European Aquatics Championships	Glasgow, Scotland	3 August 2018	
100 m backstroke	53.70	2013 Russian National Championships	Kazan	17 April 2013	
50 m breaststroke	27.34	2013 Summer Universiade	Kazan	14 July 2013	
100 m breaststroke	1:03.78	2015 California Speedo Grand Challenge	Irvine, United States	22 May 2015	
50 m butterfly	23.38	2018 FINA Swimming World Cup	Kazan	3 August 2018	

=== Short course metres (25 m pool) ===
As of 11 October 2021

Event	Time	Meet	Location	Date	Notes
50 m freestyle	20.31	2017 European Swimming Championships	Copenhagen, Denmark	15 December 2017	NR
100 m freestyle	44.95	2018 FINA Swimming World Cup	Singapore	16 November 2018	NR
50 m breaststroke	25.51	2019 European Swimming Championships	Glasgow, Scotland	4 December 2019	Former ER, NR
100 m breaststroke	56.33	2016 FINA Swimming World Cup	Beijing, China	1 October 2016	
50 m butterfly	22.17	2018 FINA Swimming World Cup	Singapore	17 November 2018	Former NR
100 m individual medley	50.26	2018 FINA Swimming World Cup	Eindhoven, Netherlands	28 September 2018	ER, NR, Former WR

=== Short course yards (25 yd pool) ===
As of 20 November 2021

Event	Time	Meet	Location	Date
50 yd freestyle	18.63	2013 NCAA Championships	Indianapolis, United States	28 March 2013
100 yd freestyle	40.76	2013 NCAA Championships	Indianapolis, United States	30 March 2013
100 yd breaststroke	52.01	2013 NCAA Championships	Indianapolis, United States	29 March 2013

== Swimming World Cup circuits ==
The following medals Morozov has won at Swimming World Cup circuits.

Edition	Gold medals	Silver medals	Bronze medals	Total
2013	19	8	3	30
2016	42	10	4	56
2017	19	3	2	24
2018	22	7	8	37
2019	20	1	0	21
2021	1	5	2	8
Total	123	34	19	176

== World records ==
=== Short course metres ===
No.	Event	Time		Meet	Location	Date	Status	Age	Ref
1	4x50 m mixed freestyle relay^{[a]}	1:29.53		2013 European Swimming Championships	Herning, Denmark	14 December 2013	Former	21	
2	4x50 m freestyle relay^{[b]}	1:22.60		2014 World Swimming Championships	Doha, Qatar	6 December 2014	Former	22	
3	100 m individual medley	50.60		2016 FINA Swimming World Cup	Chartres, France	26 August 2016	Former	24	
4	100 m individual medley (2)	50.30		2016 FINA Swimming World Cup	Berlin, Germany	30 August 2016	Former	24	
5	4x50 m medley relay^{[c]}	1:30.44		2017 European Swimming Championships	Copenhagen, Denmark	17 December 2017	Former	25	
6	100 m individual medley (3)	50.26		2018 FINA Swimming World Cup	Eindhoven, Netherlands	28 September 2018	Former	26	
7	100 m individual medley (4)	50.26	=	2018 FINA Swimming World Cup	Tokyo, Japan	9 November 2018	Former	26	
8	4x50 m mixed medley relay^{[d]}	1:36.22		2019 European Swimming Championships	Glasgow, Scotland	5 December 2019	Former	27	

^{a} split 20.72 (2nd leg); with Sergei Fesikov (1st leg), Rozaliya Nasretdinova (3rd leg), Veronika Popova (4th leg)
^{b} split 21.01 (1st leg); with Evgeny Sedov (2nd leg), Oleg Tikhobaev (3rd leg), Sergei Fesikov (4th leg)
^{c} split 20.24 for freestyle leg; with Kliment Kolesnikov (backstroke), Kirill Prigoda (breaststroke), Aleksandr Popkov (butterfly)
^{d} split 25.40 for breaststroke leg; with Kliment Kolesnikov (backstroke), Arina Surkova (butterfly), Maria Kameneva (freestyle)

== Continental and national records ==
=== Long course metres ===
No.	Event	Time		Meet	Location	Date	Type	Status	Age	Ref
1	50 m backstroke	24.80	sf	2013 Russian National Championships	Kazan	18 April 2013	NR	Former	20	
2	50 m freestyle	21.47		2013 World Aquatics Championships	Barcelona, Spain	3 August 2013	NR	Former	21	
3	50 m backstroke (2)	24.52		2014 Russian National Championships	Moscow	16 May 2014	NR	Former	21	
4	50 m freestyle (2)	21.44	sf	2017 Russian National Championships	Moscow	14 April 2017	NR	Former	24	
5	50 m backstroke (3)	24.35		2018 Russian National Championships	Moscow	20 April 2018	NR	Former	25	
6	4x100 m mixed medley relay	3:42.71		2018 European Championships	Glasgow, Scotland	6 August 2018	NR	Former	26	
7	4x100 m mixed freestyle relay	3:22.72		2019 World Aquatics Championships	Gwangju, South Korea	27 July 2019	NR	Current	27	
8	4x100 m medley relay	3:28.81		2019 World Aquatics Championships	Gwangju, South Korea	28 July 2019	NR	Current	27	
9	50 m freestyle (3)	21.27		2019 FINA Swimming World Cup	Singapore	15 August 2019	NR	Current	27	

Legend: NR – Russian record; e – equalled existing record;
Records not set in finals: h – heat; sf – semifinal; r – relay 1st leg; rh – relay heat 1st leg; b – B final; † – en route to final mark; so – swim-off; tt – time trial

=== Short course metres ===
No.	Event	Time		Meet	Location	Date	Type	Status	Age	Ref	Notes
1	50 m freestyle	20.55		2012 World Championships	Istanbul, Turkey	14 December 2012	NR	Former	20		
2	4x50 m mixed freestyle relay	1:29.53		2013 European Championships	Herning, Denmark	14 December 2013	ER, NR	Former	21		Former WR
3	4x50 m freestyle relay	1:22.60		2014 World Championships	Doha, Qatar	6 December 2014	ER, NR	Former	22		Former WR
4	100 m individual medley	50.60		2016 Swimming World Cup	Chartres, France	26 August 2016	ER, NR	Former	24		Former WR
5	100 m individual medley (2)	50.30		2016 Swimming World Cup	Berlin, Germany	30 August 2016	ER, NR	Former	24		Former WR
6	100 m freestyle	45.23		2017 Swimming World Cup	Berlin, Germany	6 August 2017	NR	Former	25		
7	50 m freestyle (2)	20.45	sf	2017 European Championships	Copenhagen, Denmark	15 December 2017	NR	Former	25		
8	50 m freestyle (3)	20.31		2017 European Championships	Copenhagen, Denmark	15 December 2017	NR	Current	25		
9	4x50 m medley relay	1:30.44		2017 European Championships	Copenhagen, Denmark	17 December 2017	ER, NR	Current	25		Former WR
10	100 m individual medley (3)	50.26		2018 Swimming World Cup	Eindhoven, Netherlands	28 September 2018	ER, NR	Current	26		Former WR
11	100 m individual medley (4)	50.26	=	2018 Swimming World Cup	Tokyo, Japan	9 November 2018	ER, NR	Current	26		Former WR
12	100 m freestyle (2)	45.16		2018 Swimming World Cup	Tokyo, Japan	10 November 2018	NR	Former	26		
13	100 m freestyle (3)	44.95		2018 Swimming World Cup	Singapore	16 November 2018	NR	Current	26		
14	50 m butterfly	22.17		2018 Swimming World Cup	Singapore	17 November 2018	NR	Former	26		
15	4x100 m freestyle relay	3:03.11		2018 World Championships	Hangzhou, China	11 December 2018	ER, NR	Current	26		
16	4x50 m freestyle relay (2)	1:22.22		2018 World Championships	Hangzhou, China	14 December 2018	NR	Current	26		
17	50 m breaststroke	25.51		2019 European Championships	Glasgow, Scotland	4 December 2019	ER, NR	Former	27		
18	4x50 m mixed medley relay	1:36.22		2019 European Championships	Glasgow, Scotland	5 December 2019	ER, NR	Current	27		WR
19	4x50 m mixed freestyle relay (2)	1:28.31		2019 European Championships	Glasgow, Scotland	7 December 2019	ER, NR	Current	27		

Legend: WR – World record; ER – European record; NR – Russian record; e – equalled existing record;
Records not set in finals: h – heat; sf – semifinal; r – relay 1st leg; rh – relay heat 1st leg; b – B final; † – en route to final mark; so – swim-off; tt – time trial

== Honours ==

Medal of the Order "For Services to the Fatherland" II degree (13 August 2012) – for outstanding contribution to the development of physical culture and sports, high athletic achievements at the XXX Olympic Games 2012 in London (United Kingdom).

== Awards ==
- Swimming World, High School Swimmer of the Year (Male): 2010
- SwimSwam, Top 100 (Men's): 2021 (#48), 2022 (#58)

== See also ==
- World record progression 100 metres individual medley
- List of World Swimming Championships (25 m) medalists (men)
- List of European Short Course Swimming Championships medalists (men)

Records
Preceded by (Germany) Markus Deibler	Men's 100-metre individual medley world record holder (short course); 26 August 2016 – 16 November 2020	Succeeded by (United States) Caeleb Dressel
Preceded by (Brazil) Guilherme Guido, Felipe França Silva, Nicholas Santos, César Cielo	Men's 4×50-metre medley relay world record holder 17 December 2017 – 3 November 2021; With: Kliment Kolesnikov, Kirill Prigoda, Aleksandr Popkov	Succeeded by (Italy) Michele Lamberti, Nicolò Martinenghi, Marco Orsi, Lorenzo Zazzeri
Preceded by (Australia) Tommaso D'Orsogna, Travis Mahoney, Cate Campbell, Bronte Campbell	Mixed 4×50-metre freestyle relay world record-holder 14 December 2013 – 6 December 2014; With: Sergey Fesikov, Rozaliya Nasretdinova, Veronika Popova	Succeeded by (United States) Josh Schneider, Matt Grevers, Madison Kennedy, Abbey Weitzeil
Sporting positions
Preceded by (South Africa) Cameron van der Burgh (South Africa) Chad le Clos	FINA Swimming World Cup; Overall male winner 2016; 2018, 2019	Succeeded by (South Africa) Chad Le Clos (South Africa) Matthew Sates
