= Andrey Grechin =

Russian swimmer

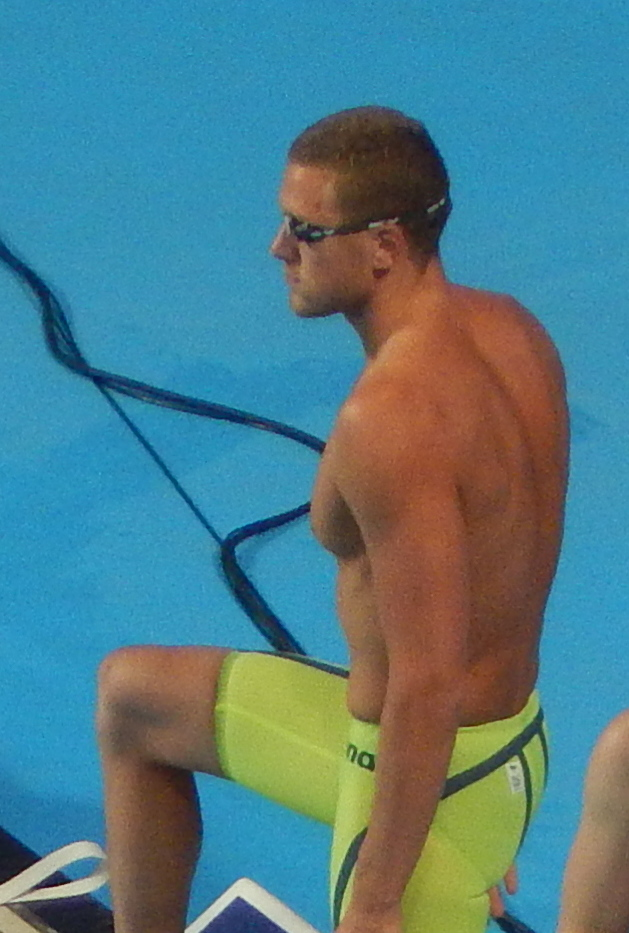
- Grechin at the 2015 World Championships

Personal information
- Full name: Andrey Vladimirovich Grechin
- Nationality: Russia
- Born: 21 October 1987 (age 38) Barnaul, Altai Krai, Russian SFSR, Soviet Union
- Height: 1.99 m (6 ft 6 in)
- Weight: 94 kg (207 lb)

Sport
- Sport: Swimming
- Strokes: Freestyle
- Coach: Gennadi Touretski
Medal record
Representing Russia
Olympic Games
Bronze medal – third place	2012 London	4×100 m freestyle
World Championships (LC)
Silver medal – second place	2009 Rome	4×100 m freestyle
Silver medal – second place	2015 Kazan	4×100 m freestyle
Bronze medal – third place	2013 Barcelona	4×100 m freestyle
European Championships (LC)
Gold medal – first place	2008 Eindhoven	4×100 m medley
Gold medal – first place	2010 Budapest	4×100 m freestyle
Silver medal – second place	2006 Budapest	4×100 m freestyle
Silver medal – second place	2014 Berlin	4×100 m freestyle
Silver medal – second place	2014 Berlin	4×100 m mixed freestyle
Silver medal – second place	2010 Budapest	4×100 m medley
European Championships (SC)
Silver medal – second place	2011 Szczecin	4×50 m freestyle
Silver medal – second place	2012 Chartres	4×50 m freestyle
Silver medal – second place	2012 Chartres	4×50 m mixed freestyle
Summer Universiade
Gold medal – first place	2007 Bangkok	100 m freestyle
Gold medal – first place	2007 Bangkok	4×100 m medley
Gold medal – first place	2013 Kazan	4×100 m freestyle
Gold medal – first place	2013 Kazan	4×100 m medley
Silver medal – second place	2013 Kazan	50 m freestyle
Bronze medal – third place	2007 Bangkok	4×100 m freestyle

Andrey Vladimirovich Grechin (Russian: Андрей Владимирович Гречин, born 21 October 1987) is a Russian swimmer. He competed in the 50 m, 100 m and 4 × 100 m freestyle and 4 × 100 m medley events at the 2008 and 2012 Olympics and won a bronze medal in the 4 × 100 m freestyle relay in 2012. He won three more medals in this event at the world championships in 2009–2015.
