= Fabien Gilot =

French swimmer (born 1984)

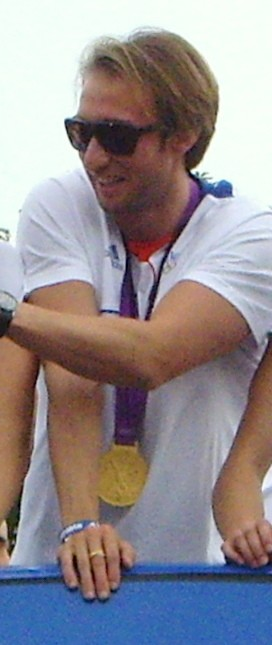

Personal information
- Full name: Fabien Pierre Aurélien Dominique Gilot
- National team: French
- Born: 27 April 1984 (age 42) Denain, France
- Height: 1.93 m (6 ft 4 in)
- Weight: 79 kg (174 lb)

Sport
- Sport: Swimming
- Strokes: Freestyle
- Club: CN Marseille
Medal record
Representing France
Olympic Games
Gold medal – first place	2012 London	4×100 m freestyle
Silver medal – second place	2008 Beijing	4×100 m freestyle
Silver medal – second place	2016 Rio de Janeiro	4×100 m freestyle
World Championships (LC)
Gold medal – first place	2013 Barcelona	4×100 m freestyle
Gold medal – first place	2013 Barcelona	4×100m medley
Gold medal – first place	2015 Kazan	4×100 m freestyle
Silver medal – second place	2011 Shanghai	4×100 m freestyle
Silver medal – second place	2011 Shanghai	4×200 m freestyle
Bronze medal – third place	2003 Barcelona	4×100 m freestyle
Bronze medal – third place	2007 Melbourne	4×100 m freestyle
Bronze medal – third place	2009 Rome	4×100 m freestyle
Bronze medal – third place	2015 Kazan	4×100 m medley
World Championships (SC)
Gold medal – first place	2010 Dubai	4×100 m freestyle
Gold medal – first place	2014 Doha	4×100 m freestyle
Silver medal – second place	2010 Dubai	100 m freestyle
Bronze medal – third place	2010 Dubai	4×200 m freestyle
European Championships (LC)
Gold medal – first place	2010 Budapest	4×100 m medley
Gold medal – first place	2014 Berlin	4×100 m freestyle
Gold medal – first place	2016 London	4×100 m freestyle
Silver medal – second place	2010 Budapest	4×100 m freestyle
Silver medal – second place	2014 Berlin	100 m freestyle
Silver medal – second place	2014 Berlin	4×100 m medley
Bronze medal – third place	2004 Madrid	4×100 m freestyle
Bronze medal – third place	2006 Budapest	4×100 m freestyle
Bronze medal – third place	2010 Budapest	50 m freestyle
European Championships (SC)
Gold medal – first place	2008 Rijeka	4×50 m freestyle
Silver medal – second place	2008 Rijeka	100 m freestyle

Fabien Pierre Aurélien Dominique Gilot (French: [fabjɛ̃ ʒilo]; born 27 April 1984) is a French Olympic and world champion swimmer.

== Early life ==
Gilot was born in Denain, France, to Michel and Yveline Gilot. He started by playing water polo, before switching to swimming.

== Career ==
He collected the large majority of his medals in freestyle and medley relay events, and is the only swimmer featured in all the medalled French relay teams since 2003. He has been part of the French swimming team since the world championship of 2003 in Barcelona.

In 2002, he became the European Junior Double Champion in the 100m freestyle, with a time of 50.47 seconds, and the 200m freestyle, with a time of 1.52.30 minutes, in Linz, Austria. In 2003 he won a bronze medal as a member of the French 400m freestyle relay team at the World Aquatics Championships in Barcelona. In 2004 he won a bronze medal in the same event at the European Aquatics Championships in Madrid.

He swam for France at the 2008 Olympics, where he was part of France's silver medal winning 4 × 100 m freestyle relay. That year he also won a gold medal in the 200m freestyle relay at the European Championships.

In 2010, he won gold medals in the 200m freestyle relay at the European Aquatics Championships and the Short Course World Championships, a silver medal in the 100m freestyle at the Short Course World Championships in Dubai, and a bronze medal in 50m freestyle race at the European Championships in Budapest. In 2011 he won silver medals in the 400m freestyle relay and the 800m freestyle relay at the World Aquatics Championships in Shanghai.

In the London 2012 Summer Olympics he again swam for France, and as part of France's team in the Men's 4 × 100 metre freestyle relay, shared in the team's gold medal. In his victory wave, Gilot revealed an underarm tattoo with three Hebrew words אני כלום בלעדיהם meaning: "I am nothing without them", which he explained was a tribute to his maternal grandmother's Jewish German-born husband Max Goldschmidt, an Auschwitz concentration camp Holocaust survivor. Gilot said that this quote had a very special meaning for him, representing his family and three stars – one for each of his brothers, as well as for his Olympic appearances. He described Goldschmidt as "a grandfather in every way". Goldschmidt died in 2012, but was able to see his grandson's tattoo and his swimming achievements, although not his Olympic gold.

Starting in 2013, Gilot became the team captain of the French swimming team, at European Championships (Berlin 2014), World (Kazan 2015), and at the Olympics (Rio de Janeiro 2016). In 2013 Gilot became a double World Champion as a member of France’s 4×100 meter freestyle (3:11.18) and medley (3:31.51) relays at the FINA World Championships in Barcelona. In 2014, he won a silver medal in the 100m freestyle at the European Championships in Berlin. In 2015, he again won a gold medal at the FINA World Championships in the 4×100 meter freestyle (3:10.74), in Kazan, while his team won a bronze medal in the 4×100m medley relay (3:30.50).

In the 2016 Rio Olympics, Gilot and his 2015 world champion teammates won the silver medal in the 4 × 100 m freestyle relay (3:10.53).

Gilot will take part in the torch lighting ceremony at the 2017 Maccabiah Games on 6 July 2017.
