= Luca Leonardi =

Italian swimmer (born 1991)

Personal information
- Born: 1 January 1991 (age 35) Milan, Italy
- Height: 1.91 m (6 ft 3 in)
- Weight: 90.6 kg (200 lb)

Sport
- Sport: Swimming
- Club: GS Fiamme Oro Roma
Medal record
European Championships (LC)
Gold medal – first place	2014 Berlin	4×100 m mixed freestyle
Silver medal – second place	2012 Debrecen	4×100 m freestyle
Silver medal – second place	2016 London	4×100 m freestyle
Bronze medal – third place	2014 Berlin	4×100 m freestyle
Bronze medal – third place	2014 Berlin	100 m freestyle
European Championships (SC)
Gold medal – first place	2010 Eindhoven	4×50 m freestyle

Luca Leonardi (born 1 January 1991) is an Italian freestyle swimmer. He won an individual bronze in the 100 m at the 2014 European Aquatics Championships, as well as several medals in the freestyle relays at European championships; in those relays, he sometimes swam in the preliminaries, but not in the finals.

Leonardi is an athlete of the Gruppo Sportivo Fiamme Oro.
