= Marco Belotti =

Italian swimmer (born 1988)

Personal information
- Full name: Marco Belotti
- Nationality: Italy
- Born: 29 November 1988 (age 37) Brescia, Italy
- Height: 1.84 m (6 ft 1/2 in)
- Weight: 70 kg (154 lb)

Sport
- Sport: Swimming
- Strokes: Freestyle
Medal record
World Championships (SC)
Silver medal – second place	2014 Doha	4×200 m freestyle
Bronze medal – third place	2014 Doha	4×50 m freestyle
Summer Universiade
Bronze medal – third place	2015 Gwangju	100 m Freestyle

Marco Belotti (born 29 November 1988 in Brescia) is an Italian freestyle swimmer. He competed at the 2008, 2012 and 2016 Summer Olympics. At the 2008 Summer Olympics, he competed in the 4 x 100 m and 4 x 200 m freestyle relays. In 2012, he competed in the men's individual 200 m freestyle and the 4 x 200 m freestyle, and, in 2016, he competed in the 4 x 200 m freestyle relay only.
