= Clément Mignon =

French swimmer (born 1993)

Personal information
- Nationality: French
- Born: 21 January 1993 (age 33) Aix-en-Provence, France
- Height: 1.87 m (6 ft 2 in)
- Weight: 78 kg (172 lb)

Sport
- Sport: Swimming
- Strokes: Freestyle
Medal record
Olympic Games
Silver medal – second place	2016 Rio de Janeiro	4×100 m freestyle
World Championships (LC)
Gold medal – first place	2015 Kazan	4×100 m freestyle
Bronze medal – third place	2019 Gwangju	4×100 m mixed freestyle
World Championships (SC)
Gold medal – first place	2014 Doha	4×100 m freestyle
Silver medal – second place	2014 Doha	4×50 m medley
Silver medal – second place	2016 Windsor	4×100 m freestyle
Bronze medal – third place	2014 Doha	4×100 m medley
European championships (LC)
Gold medal – first place	2014 Berlin	4×100 m freestyle
Gold medal – first place	2016 London	4×100 m freestyle
Bronze medal – third place	2014 Berlin	4×100 m mixed freestyle
Bronze medal – third place	2016 London	100 m freestyle
Bronze medal – third place	2016 London	4×100 m mixed freestyle
European Championships (SC)
Bronze medal – third place	2019 Glasgow	4×50 m mixed freestyle

Clément Mignon (born 21 January 1993) is a French swimmer. He was part of the heat swimmers of the freestyle 4×100 m teams that won medals at the 2014 European Aquatics Championships and 2015 World Aquatics Championships.
