= Marco Orsi =

Italian swimmer

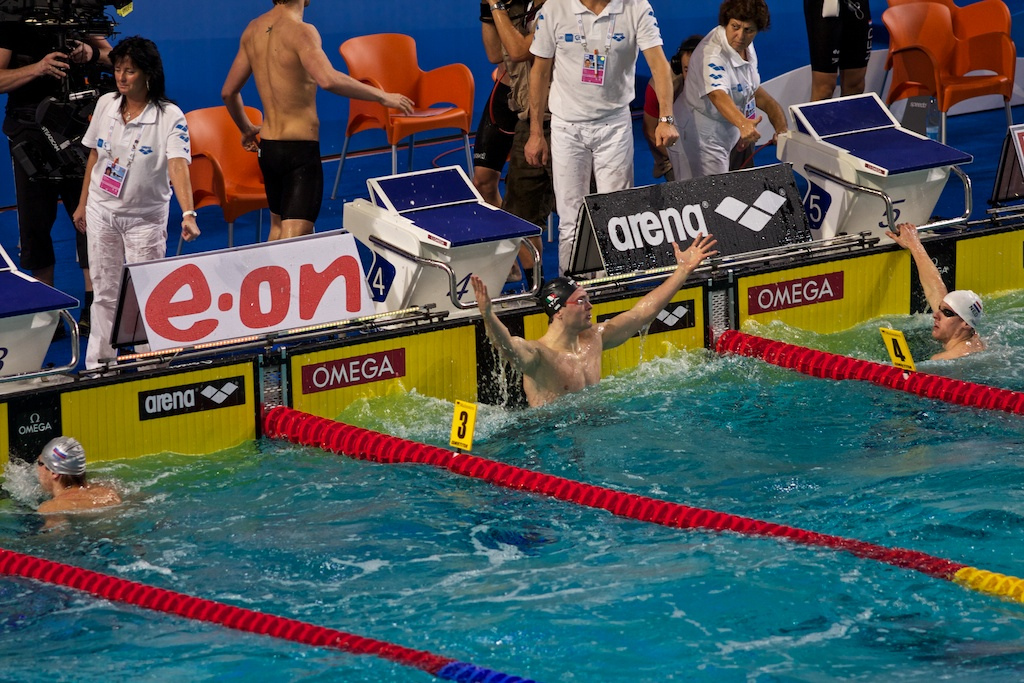
- Orsi exults after victory in 4×50 m freestyle at Eindhoven 2010.

Personal information
- National team: Italy
- Born: 11 December 1990 (age 35) Budrio, Italy
- Height: 1.89 m (6 ft 2 in)
- Weight: 93 kg (205 lb)

Sport
- Sport: Swimming
- Strokes: Freestyle
- Club: C.N. Uisp Bologna; Fiamme Oro.
- Coach: Roberto Odaldi
Medal record
Representing Italy
Men's swimming
Event	1st	2nd	3rd
World Championships (LC)	0	0	1
World Championships (SC)	0	3	1
European Championships (LC)	0	0	1
European Championships (SC)	9	11	5
Mediterranean Games	2	1	0
Total	11	15	8
World Championships (LC)
Bronze medal – third place	2015 Kazan	4×100 m freestyle
World Championships (SC)
Silver medal – second place	2012 Istanbul	4×100 m freestyle
Silver medal – second place	2014 Doha	50 m freestyle
Silver medal – second place	2018 Hangzhou	100 m medley
Bronze medal – third place	2014 Doha	4×50 m freestyle
European Championships (LC)
Silver medal – second place	2012 Debrecen	4×100 m freestyle
Bronze medal – third place	2014 Berlin	4×100 m freestyle
European Championships (SC)
Gold medal – first place	2010 Eindhoven	4×50 m freestyle
Gold medal – first place	2011 Szczecin	4×50 m freestyle
Gold medal – first place	2011 Szczecin	4×50 m medley
Gold medal – first place	2015 Netanya	100 m freestyle
Gold medal – first place	2015 Netanya	4×50 m medley
Gold medal – first place	2015 Netanya	4×50 m mixed freestyle
Gold medal – first place	2017 Copenhagen	100 m medley
Gold medal – first place	2021 Kazan	100 m medley
Gold medal – first place	2021 Kazan	4×50 m medley
Silver medal – second place	2008 Rijeka	4×50 m freestyle
Silver medal – second place	2010 Eindhoven	50 m freestyle
Silver medal – second place	2010 Eindhoven	4×50 m medley
Silver medal – second place	2013 Herning	50 m freestyle
Silver medal – second place	2013 Herning	4×50 m medley
Silver medal – second place	2013 Herning	4×50 m mixed freestyle
Silver medal – second place	2013 Herning	4×50 m freestyle
Silver medal – second place	2015 Netanya	50 m freestyle
Silver medal – second place	2015 Netanya	4×50 m freestyle
Silver medal – second place	2017 Copenhagen	4×50 m freestyle
Silver medal – second place	2021 Kazan	4×50 m freestyle
Bronze medal – third place	2009 Istanbul	4×50 m freestyle
Bronze medal – third place	2011 Szczecin	50 m freestyle
Bronze medal – third place	2013 Herning	100 m freestyle
Bronze medal – third place	2017 Copenhagen	4×50 m mixed freestyle
Bronze medal – third place	2019 Glasgow	4×50 m freestyle
Mediterranean Games
Gold medal – first place	2013 Mersin	50 m freestyle
Gold medal – first place	2013 Mersin	4×100 m freestyle
Silver medal – second place	2009 Pescara	4×100 m freestyle
Men's finswimming
World Games
Bronze medal – third place	2025 Chengdu	50 m bi-fins
World Championships
Silver medal – second place	2022 Cali	50 m bi-fins
Silver medal – second place	2022 Cali	4×100 m mixed bi-fins
Silver medal – second place	2024 Belgrade	50 m bi-fins
Silver medal – second place	2024 Belgrade	4×100 m mixed bi-fins
Mediterranean Games
Gold medal – first place	2026 Taranto	4×50 m mixed bi-fins

Marco Orsi (born 11 December 1990) is an Italian competitive swimmer who won eight gold medal at the European Short Course Swimming Championships.

== Career ==
In 2012 Marco Orsi qualified for his first Olympic appearance in London 2012. He is trained by Roberto Odaldi. He competed in the men's 50 m freestyle, and was part of the Italian men's 4 × 100 m freestyle relay team. At the 2016 Summer Olympics, he was part of the Italian men's 4 × 100 m freestyle relay team.

== See also ==
- Italian swimmers multiple medalists at the international competitions

Records
Preceded by (Russia) Kliment Kolesnikov, Kirill Prigoda, Aleksandr Popkov, Vladimir Morozov	Men's 4×50-metre medley relay world record holder 3 November 2021 – 17 December 2022; With: Michele Lamberti, Nicolò Martinenghi, Lorenzo Zazzeri	Succeeded by (Italy) Lorenzo Mora, Nicolò Martinenghi, Matteo Rivolta, Leonardo Deplano
