= Bruno Ortiz-Cañavate =

Spanish swimmer

Personal information
- Full name: Bruno Ortiz-Cañavate Ozeki
- Born: 15 February 1993 (age 33)

Sport
- Sport: Swimming

Bruno Ortiz-Cañavate Ozeki (born 15 February 1993) is a Spanish swimmer. He competed in the men's 4 × 100 metre freestyle relay event at the 2016 Summer Olympics.
