= Christos Katrantzis =

Greek swimmer

Personal information
- Native name: Χρήστος Κατραντζής
- Nationality: Greek
- Born: 30 March 1992 (age 34)
- Height: 188 cm (6 ft 2 in)
- Weight: 78 kg (172 lb)

Sport
- Sport: Swimming
Medal record
Representing Greece
Mediterranean Games
Bronze medal – third place	2013 Mersin	4x100m freestyle relay

Christos Katrantzis (Greek: Χρήστος Κατραντζής, born 30 March 1992) is a Greek swimmer. He competed in the men's 4 × 100 metre freestyle relay event at the 2016 Summer Olympics. The team finished 10th in the heats and did not qualify for the final.
