= Filippo Magnini =

Italian swimmer (born 1982)

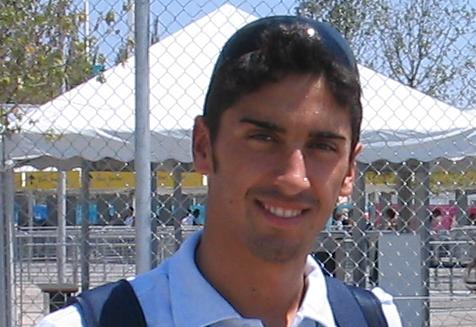

Personal information
- Nicknames: Magno, Superpippo
- Nationality: Italian
- Born: 2 February 1982 (age 44) Pesaro, Italy
- Height: 1.88 m (6 ft 2 in)
- Weight: 80 kg (180 lb; 13 st)
- Website: FilippoMagnini.it

Sport
- Sport: Swimming
- Strokes: Freestyle
- Coach: Claudio Rossetto
Medal record
| Event | 1st | 2nd | 3rd |
|---|---|---|---|
| Olympic Games | 0 | 0 | 1 |
| World Championships (LC) | 2 | 1 | 1 |
| World Championships (SC) | 2 | 5 | 2 |
| European Championships (LC) | 9 | 5 | 5 |
| European Championships (SC) | 8 | 7 | 5 |
| Total | 21 | 18 | 14 |
Olympic Games
| Bronze medal – third place | 2004 Athens | 4×200 m freestyle |
World Championships (LC)
| Gold medal – first place | 2005 Montreal | 100 m freestyle |
| Gold medal – first place | 2007 Melbourne | 100 m freestyle |
| Silver medal – second place | 2007 Melbourne | 4×100 m freestyle |
| Bronze medal – third place | 2015 Kazan | 4×100 m freestyle |
World Championships (SC)
| Gold medal – first place | 2006 Shanghai | 4×100 m freestyle |
| Gold medal – first place | 2006 Shanghai | 4×200 m freestyle |
| Silver medal – second place | 2006 Shanghai | 100 m freestyle |
| Silver medal – second place | 2006 Shanghai | 200 m freestyle |
| Silver medal – second place | 2008 Manchester | 100 m freestyle |
| Silver medal – second place | 2012 Istanbul | 4×100 m freestyle |
| Silver medal – second place | 2014 Doha | 4×200 m freestyle |
| Bronze medal – third place | 2008 Manchester | 4×200 m freestyle |
| Bronze medal – third place | 2014 Doha | 4×50 m freestyle |
European Championships (LC)
| Gold medal – first place | 2004 Madrid | 100 m freestyle |
| Gold medal – first place | 2004 Madrid | 4×100 m freestyle |
| Gold medal – first place | 2004 Madrid | 4×200 m freestyle |
| Gold medal – first place | 2006 Budapest | 100 m freestyle |
| Gold medal – first place | 2006 Budapest | 4×100 m freestyle |
| Gold medal – first place | 2006 Budapest | 4×200 m freestyle |
| Gold medal – first place | 2008 Eindhoven | 4×200 m freestyle |
| Gold medal – first place | 2012 Debrecen | 100 m freestyle |
| Gold medal – first place | 2012 Debrecen | 4×100 m medley |
| Silver medal – second place | 2008 Eindhoven | 4×100 m freestyle |
| Silver medal – second place | 2012 Debrecen | 4×100 m freestyle |
| Silver medal – second place | 2012 Debrecen | 4×200 m freestyle |
| Silver medal – second place | 2016 London | 4×100 m freestyle |
| Silver medal – second place | 2016 London | 4×100 m mixed freestyle |
| Bronze medal – third place | 2004 Madrid | 200 m freestyle |
| Bronze medal – third place | 2006 Budapest | 200 m freestyle |
| Bronze medal – third place | 2008 Eindhoven | 100 m freestyle |
| Bronze medal – third place | 2014 Berlin | 4×100 m freestyle |
| Bronze medal – third place | 2016 London | 4x200 m freestyle |
European Championships (SC)
| Gold medal – first place | 2004 Vienna | 200 m freestyle |
| Gold medal – first place | 2005 Trieste | 100 m freestyle |
| Gold medal – first place | 2005 Trieste | 200 m freestyle |
| Gold medal – first place | 2006 Helsinki | 100 m freestyle |
| Gold medal – first place | 2006 Helsinki | 200 m freestyle |
| Gold medal – first place | 2007 Debrecen | 200 m freestyle |
| Gold medal – first place | 2008 Rijeka | 4×50 m medley |
| Gold medal – first place | 2010 Eindhoven | 4×50 m freestyle |
| Silver medal – second place | 2003 Dublin | 100 m freestyle |
| Silver medal – second place | 2004 Vienna | 100 m freestyle |
| Silver medal – second place | 2008 Rijeka | 4×50 m freestyle |
| Silver medal – second place | 2010 Eindhoven | 4×50 m medley |
| Silver medal – second place | 2011 Szczecin | 200 m freestyle |
| Silver medal – second place | 2013 Herning | 4×50 m freestyle |
| Silver medal – second place | 2015 Netanya | 4×50 m freestyle |
| Bronze medal – third place | 2006 Helsinki | 4×50 m medley |
| Bronze medal – third place | 2007 Debrecen | 100 m freestyle |
| Bronze medal – third place | 2008 Rijeka | 100 m freestyle |
| Bronze medal – third place | 2009 Istanbul | 4×50 m freestyle |
| Bronze medal – third place | 2013 Herning | 200 m freestyle |
Mediterranean Games
| Gold medal – first place | 2009 Pescara | 4×200 m freestyle |
| Silver medal – second place | 2005 Almería | 100 m freestyle |
| Silver medal – second place | 2009 Pescara | 100 m freestyle |

Filippo Magnini (Italian pronunciation: [fiˈlippo maɲˈɲiːni]; born 2 February 1982) is an Italian retired competitive swimmer who was twice 100 metres freestyle World champion and three times European champion at that distance.

== Biography ==
Magnini was born in Pesaro, Marche.

As a youth he played basketball, soccer, beach volleyball and tennis, but shifted to swimming at the age of ten. His first cap with Italian Swimming National Team was in 1998. Raised as a breaststroker, after 2000 he dedicated totally to freestyle swimming, soon to achieving noteworthy results. Magnini gained his first international honour in 2003, with a silver medal in 100 m freestyle at the European Swimming Championships (short course) in Dublin. He won three more gold medals (in the 100 m, 4×100 m relay and 4×200 m relay freestyle) and one bronze medal at the 2004 European Championships (long course) in Madrid. At the 2004 Summer Olympics Magnini won the bronze medal in the 4×200 m freestyle relay, achieving 5th place in the 100 m freestyle. His steady rise reached its highest point at the 2005 World Aquatics Championships, where he won the gold medal in the men's 100 m freestyle with the time of 48.12, then the all-time second fastest behind Pieter van den Hoogenband's world record.

At the 2006 European Aquatics Championships he won the gold medal in the 100 m and in the 4×200 m freestyle races, and a bronze in the 200 m freestyle. The following year, he defended his world championship gold medal in the 100 m, when he tied for first place with Canadian Brent Hayden in a time of 48.43, resulting in joint gold. He also won a silver medal in the 4 × 100 m. Since then he has won silver and medals at the World Short Course Championships (silver – 100 m freestyle, 2007, 4 × 100 m freestyle, 2012, 4 × 200 m freestyle, 2014; bronze – 4 × 200 m freestyle, 2008, 4 x 50 m freestyle, 2014), and gold, silver and bronze medals at European level.

Magnini's nickname is "Superpippo". Pippo is the normal Italian nickname of Filippo but also of Goofy's Italian version, and therefore the complete nickname refers to the funny superhero in which the comics character transforms sometimes in his Italian edition. From August 2011 has a romance with fellow swimmer Federica Pellegrini.

On 8 July 2019, it was reported that Magnini saved newlywed Andrea Benedetto from drowning off a Sardinian beach. "The bather was in a lot of trouble: he was quite frightened, he was really stuck and had swallowed some seawater," Magnini said. "When I reached him he wasn't even able to speak, and it wasn't easy to lift him on to the raft, so we laid him on an airbed that some other bathers had nearby."

== London 2012 controversy ==
At the 2012 Olympics Magnini failed to qualify for the finals in all the events he was competing in. After these disappointing performances he blamed the coach and the swimming team leaders for poor training management of the whole Italian team, spurring a strong media reaction for what was judged as an immature and irresponsible behavior.

== Palmarès ==
| | Olympics | | | World Ch. | | | World Ch. (SC) | | | European Ch. | | | European Ch (SC) | | | Total | | | |
|---|---|---|---|---|---|---|---|---|---|---|---|---|---|---|---|---|---|---|---|
| | 1st place, gold medalist(s) | 2nd place, silver medalist(s) | 3rd place, bronze medalist(s) | 1st place, gold medalist(s) | 2nd place, silver medalist(s) | 3rd place, bronze medalist(s) | 1st place, gold medalist(s) | 2nd place, silver medalist(s) | 3rd place, bronze medalist(s) | 1st place, gold medalist(s) | 2nd place, silver medalist(s) | 3rd place, bronze medalist(s) | 1st place, gold medalist(s) | 2nd place, silver medalist(s) | 3rd place, bronze medalist(s) | 1st place, gold medalist(s) | 2nd place, silver medalist(s) | 3rd place, bronze medalist(s) | Tot |
| Individual | 0 | 0 | 0 | 2 | 0 | 0 | 0 | 3 | 0 | 3 | 0 | 3 | 6 | 3 | 3 | 11 | 6 | 6 | 23 |
| Team | 0 | 0 | 1 | 0 | 1 | 1 | 2 | 2 | 2 | 6 | 5 | 2 | 2 | 4 | 2 | 10 | 12 | 8 | 30 |
| Total | 0 | 0 | 1 | 2 | 1 | 1 | 2 | 5 | 2 | 9 | 5 | 5 | 8 | 7 | 5 | 21 | 18 | 14 | 53 |

== Personal bests ==
In long-course swim pools Magnini's personal bests are:

- 100 m freestyle: 48.04 (46.52 in short course)
- 200 m freestyle: 1:47.20 (1:42.89 in short course)

== See also ==
- Italian swimmers multiple medalists at the internetional competitions* List of Italian records in swimming
- Italian record progression 100 metres freestyle
- Italian record progression 200 metres freestyle
- List of Mediterranean Games records in swimming

Awards and achievements
| Preceded by Stefano Baldini | Italian Sportsman of the Year; 2005–2007 | Succeeded by Stefano Baldini |
