= Daniel Macovei =

Romanian swimmer

Personal information
- Born: 15 September 1992 (age 33) Bucharest, Romania

Sport
- Sport: Swimming

Daniel Macovei (born 15 September 1992) is a Romanian swimmer. He competed in the men's 4 × 100 metre freestyle relay event at the 2016 Summer Olympics.
