= Marius Radu (swimmer) =

Romanian swimmer

Personal information
- Born: 18 June 1992 (age 34) Bucharest, Romania

Sport
- Sport: Swimming

Marius Radu (born 18 June 1992) is a Romanian swimmer. He competed in the men's 4 × 100 metre freestyle relay event at the 2016 Summer Olympics.
