= Markel Alberdi =

Spanish swimmer

Personal information
- Full name: Markel Alberdi Sarobe
- Nationality: Spanish
- Born: 22 October 1991 (age 34) Eibar, Gipuzkoa, Basque Country, Spain
- Height: 1.86 m (6 ft 1 in)
- Weight: 76 kg (168 lb)

Sport
- Sport: Swimming
- Strokes: Freestyle
- College team: Bidasoa XXI

Markel Alberdi Sarobe (born 22 October 1991) is a Spanish swimmer. He competed in the men's 4 × 100 metre freestyle relay event at the 2016 Summer Olympics.
