= Emmanuel Vanluchene =

Belgian swimmer

Medal record

Men's swimming

Representing Belgium

European Championships
Bronze medal – third place	2014 Berlin	4x200 m freestyle

European Championships (SC)
Bronze medal – third place	2011 Szczecin	4×50 m freestyle
Bronze medal – third place	2012 Chartres	4×50 m freestyle

Emmanuel Vanluchene (born 9 December 1992) is a Belgian swimmer. He is competing for Belgium at the 2012 Summer Olympics.
