= 2006 European Junior Swimming Championships =

Water sport competitions

The 2006 European Junior Swimming Championships were held from July 6 to July 9, 2006, in Palma de Mallorca, Spain. The age groups for this event were girls born in 1990 or 1991 and boys born in 1988 or 1989.

== Medal table ==
* Host nation (Spain)

Rank	Nation	Gold	Silver	Bronze	Total
1	Russia (RUS)	11	5	2	18
2	Italy (ITA)	7	5	7	19
3	Great Britain (GBR)	6	7	2	15
4	Spain (ESP)*	4	0	0	4
5	Hungary (HUN)	3	4	6	13
6	Germany (GER)	2	1	0	3
7	Poland (POL)	1	4	6	11
8	Croatia (CRO)	1	2	3	6
8	France (FRA)	1	2	3	6
10	Romania (ROU)	1	1	0	2
11	Belgium (BEL)	1	0	1	2
12	Sweden (SWE)	0	2	2	4
13	Austria (AUT)	0	1	1	2
13	Netherlands (NED)	0	1	1	2
13	Slovenia (SLO)	0	1	1	2
16	Denmark (DEN)	0	1	0	1
16	Estonia (EST)	0	1	0	1
16	Portugal (POR)	0	1	0	1
19	Ukraine (UKR)	0	0	3	3
20	Belarus (BLR)	0	0	1	1
20	Greece (GRE)	0	0	1	1
20	Lithuania (LTU)	0	0	1	1
Totals (22 entries)		38	39	41	118

== Medal summary ==
=== Boy's events ===
Event	Gold		Silver		Bronze	
50 m freestyle	Norbert Trandafir; Romania	22.80	Sergey Fesikov; Russia	23.16	Yoris Grandjean; Belgium	23.18
100 m freestyle	Yoris Grandjean; Belgium	50.89	Norbert Trandafir; Romania	50.90	Sebastian Wikström; Michele Santucci; Sweden; Italy	51.15
200 m freestyle	Robbie Renwick; Great Britain	1:49.26	Federico Colbertaldo; Italy	1:49.94	Ioannis Giannoulis; Greece	1:50.91
400 m freestyle	Federico Colbertaldo; Italy	3:49.12	Alexander Selin; Russia	3:50.94	Nikita Lobintsev; Russia	3:51.90
1500 m freestyle	Nikita Lobintsev; Russia	15:06.15	Federico Colbertaldo; Italy	15:10.82	Maciej Hreniak; Poland	15:11.93
50 m backstroke	Ivan Tolic; Croatia	26.04	Mathias Gydesen; Denmark	26.44	Damiano Lestingi; Italy	26.59
100 m backstroke	Damiano Lestingi; Italy	56.85	János Szabó; Hungary	57.16	Ivan Tolic; Croatia	57.31
200 m backstroke	Damiano Lestingi; Italy	2:00.32	Pedro Oliveira; Portugal	2:02.75	Andriy Nikishenko; Ukraine	2:03.50
50 m breaststroke	Mattia Pesce; Italy	28.59	Damir Dugonjič; Slovenia	28.65	Aurimas Valaitis; Lithuania	28.98
100 m breaststroke	Slawomir Wolniak; Poland	1:02.40	Edoardo Giorgetti; Italy	1:02.61	Piotr Galka; Poland	1:03.12
200 m breaststroke	Edoardo Giorgetti; Italy	2:15.00	Slawomir Wolniak; Poland	2:15.19	Luca Pizzini; Italy	2:15.69
50 m butterfly	Rafael Muñoz; Spain	24.21	Mario Todorović; Croatia	24.28	Dominik Straga; Croatia	24.62
100 m butterfly	Joseph Davide Natullo; Italy	54.07	Mario Todorović; Croatia	54.20	Dominik Straga; Yauheni Lazuka; Croatia; Belarus	54.51
200 m butterfly	Joseph Davide Natullo; Italy	1:58.53	Gergő Kis; Hungary	1:58.68	Norbert Kovacs; Hungary	2:00.20
200 m individual medley	Gergő Kis; Hungary	2:03.53	Martin Liivamägi; Estonia	2:03.67	Dávid Verrasztó; Hungary	2:03.89
400 m individual medley	Gergő Kis; Hungary	4:16.82	Dávid Verrasztó; Hungary	4:19.30	Mateusz Matczak; Poland	4:20.27
4 × 100 m freestyle relay	Russia (51.92) Alexey Kolesnikov (50.69) Sergey Perunin (50.62) Alexander Sukhorukov (50.40) Sergey Fesikov	3:23.63	Great Britain (51.84) David Waslin (51.29) Adam Brown (51.71) Christopher Middleton (50.75) Robbie Renwick	3:25.59	Italy (51.49) Riccardo D'Acquisto (51.49) Marco Belotti (50.95) Michele Santucci (51.17) Lorenzo Mileti Nardo	3:25.64
4 × 200 m freestyle relay	Russia (1:50.39) Sergey Perunin (1:50.70) Nikita Lobintsev (1:51.38) Alexander Sukhorukov (1:50.55) Alexander Selin	7:23.02	Italy (1:52.00) Cesare Sciocchetti (1:51.73) Manuel Vincenzi (1:50.58) Federico Colbertaldo (1:53.49) Michele Santucci	7:27.80	France (1:52.18) Xavier Lepretre (1:53.40) Anthony Pannier (1:52.63) Joris Hustache (1:51.75) Kevin Munier	7:29.96
4 × 100 m medley relay	Spain (57.89) Alan Cabello Forns (1:04.78) Melquiades Alvarez Caraballo (54.04) Pablo Ordonez Mena (50.92) Marcos Vazquez Pomar	3:47.63	Poland (59.46) Tomasz Gaszyk (1:02.62) Slawomir Wolniak (55.58) Mikolaj Czarnecki (50.98) Mateusz Haas	3:48.64	Great Britain (58.23) Marco Loughran (1:04.39) Max Partridge (55.14) Christopher Chasser (50.92) Robbie Renwick	3:48.68

=== Girl's events ===
Event	Gold		Silver		Bronze	
50 m freestyle	Francesca Halsall; Great Britain	25.28	Ranomi Kromowidjojo; Netherlands	25.81	Dar'ya Stepanyuk; Ukraine	26.05
100 m freestyle	Francesca Halsall; Great Britain	55.47	Ophélie-Cyrielle Étienne; France	56.80	Nathalie Lindborg; Sweden	57.00
200 m freestyle	Mireia Belmonte García; Spain	2:01.61	Francesca Halsall; Great Britain	2:01.93	Ophélie-Cyrielle Étienne; France	2:02.00
400 m freestyle	Aurélie Muller; France	4:15.72	Joanna Budzis; Poland	4:16.00	Giulia Bolgiani; Italy	4:16.03
800 m freestyle	Elena Sokolova; Russia	8:43.53	Giulia Bolgiani; Italy	8:43.65	Monika Mocnik; Slovenia	8:49.03
50 m backstroke	Christin Zenner; Germany	29.38	Anastasia Zuyeva; Russia	29.60	Helga Kalicz; Hungary	29.87
100 m backstroke	Anastasia Zuyeva; Russia	1:02.32	Elizabeth Simmonds; Great Britain	1:02.79	Georgia Davies; Great Britain	1:03.87
200 m backstroke	Elizabeth Simmonds; Great Britain	2:12.78	Anastasia Zuyeva; Russia	2:15.48	Oxana Shlapakova; Russia	2:15.83
50 m breaststroke	Anna Kuzmicheva; Russia	32.52	Hanna Westrin; Sweden	32.61	Luiza Hryniewicz; Poland	32.93
100 m breaststroke	Anna Kuzmicheva; Russia	1:09.95	Hanna Westrin; Sweden	1:10.19	Luiza Hryniewicz; Poland	1:11.61
200 m breaststroke	Anna Kuzmicheva; Russia	2:30.85	Katarzyna Dembniak; Poland	2:32.13	Katalin Bor; Hungary	2:32.32
50 m butterfly	Lena Celina Hiller; Germany	27.29	Lise Soule; France	27.56	Ranomi Kromowidjojo; Netherlands	27.59
100 m butterfly	Eszter Dara; Hungary	1:00.55	Jemma Lowe; Great Britain	1:00.74	Ilaria Bianchi; Italy	1:01.05
200 m butterfly	Jessica Dickons; Great Britain	2:10.07	Jemma Lowe; Great Britain	2:11.59	Nina Dittrich; Austria	2:12.84
200 m individual medley	Olga Shulgina; Russia	2:15.42	Nina Dittrich; Austria	2:17.86	Eszter Dara; Hungary	2:18.22
400 m individual medley	Mireia Belmonte García; Spain	4:46.24	Jessica Dickons; Great Britain	4:51.58	Eszter Dara; Hungary	4:53.92
4 × 100 m freestyle relay	Great Britain (58.34) Natalie Durant (57.82) Chloe Ross (57.08) Lauren Collins (54.65) Francesca Halsall	3:47.89	Germany (57.58) Lisa Vitting (57.28) Uta Mueller (57.36) Karoline Guenther (57.01) Lena Celina Hiller	3:49.23	Russia (57.06) Olga Shulgina (58.34) Oxana Shlapakova (57.22) Natalia Miselimyan (56.61) Victoria Malyutina	3:49.23
4 × 200 m freestyle relay	Russia (2:04.08) Anastasia Aksenova (2:01.40) Olga Shulgina (2:03.61) Olga Karmanchikova (2:01.87) Victoria Malyutina	8:10.96	Great Britain (2:02.32) Francesca Halsall (2:03.68) Natalie Durant (2:03.59) Elizabeth Simmonds (2:02.17) Rachael George	8:11.76	Italy (2:04.15) Giulia Bolgiani (2:05.69) Cinzia Sciocchetti (2:05.58) Anna Greselin (2:05.88) Carolina Bianchetto	8:21.30
4 × 100 m medley relay	Russia (1:02.79) Anastasia Zuyeva (1:10.20) Anna Kuzmicheva (1:02.07) Anastasia Aksenova (57.57) Victoria Malyutina	4:12.63	Hungary (1:03.81) Helga Kalicz (1:11.20) Katalin Bor (1:01.69) Emese Kovacs (57.71) Eszter Dara	4:14.41	France (1:03.81) Reine Vitoria Weber (1:13.72) Fanny Garruchet (1:01.11) Lise Soule (56.45) Ophélie-Cyrielle Étienne	4:15.09
