= 2007 European Junior Swimming Championships =

Water sport competitions

The 2007 European Junior Swimming Championships were held from July 18 to July 22, 2007 in Antwerp, Belgium.

== Medal table ==
* Host nation (Belgium)

Rank	Nation	Gold	Silver	Bronze	Total
1	Russia (RUS)	8	8	4	20
2	Great Britain (GBR)	6	7	3	16
3	Poland (POL)	6	1	3	10
4	Hungary (HUN)	5	1	5	11
5	Italy (ITA)	4	7	7	18
6	Germany (GER)	3	5	3	11
7	Austria (AUT)	2	1	1	4
8	Ukraine (UKR)	2	0	1	3
9	France (FRA)	1	4	2	7
10	Serbia (SRB)	1	2	0	3
11	Belgium (BEL)*	1	1	2	4
12	Sweden (SWE)	1	0	3	4
13	Belarus (BLR)	0	1	2	3
14	Israel (ISR)	0	1	1	2
15	Croatia (CRO)	0	1	0	1
16	Greece (GRE)	0	0	2	2
17	Lithuania (LTU)	0	0	1	1
Totals (17 entries)		40	40	40	120

== Medal summary ==
=== Boy's events ===
Event	Gold		Silver		Bronze	
50 m freestyle	Sergey Fesikov; Russia	22.63	Oleg Tikhobaev; Russia	22.64	Luca Dotto; Italy	22.90
100 m freestyle	Yoris Grandjean; Belgium	49.91	Sergey Fesikov; Russia	49.97	Oleg Tikhobaev; Russia	50.63
200 m freestyle	Mikhail Polishschuk; Russia	1:48.90	Nimrod Shapira; Israel	1:50.36	Glenn Surgeloose; Belgium	1:50.79
400 m freestyle	Mateusz Matczak; Poland	3:51.34	Luca Baggio; Italy	3:54.12	Nimrod Shapira; Israel	3:54.83
800 m freestyle	Maciej Hreniak; Poland	8:01.89	Luca Baggio; Italy	8:04.54	Davide Sitti; Italy	8:05.90
1500 m freestyle	Maciej Hreniak; Poland	15:10.78	Luca Baggio; Italy	15:22.17	Davide Sitti; Italy	15:28.00
50 m backstroke	Adam Maczewski; Poland	26.30	Marco Loughran; Great Britain	26.46	Rustam Rybin; Russia	26.55
100 m backstroke	Marco Loughran; Great Britain	55.63	Damiano Lestingi; Italy	55.64	Felix Wolf; Germany	56.64
200 m backstroke	Damiano Lestingi; Italy	1:59.34	Marco Loughran; Great Britain	2:00.50	Gábor Balog; Hungary	2:01.23
50 m breaststroke	Mattia Pesce; Italy	28.43	Csaba Szilágyi; Serbia	28.53	Viktar Vabishchevich; Belarus	28.62
100 m breaststroke	Dániel Gyurta; Hungary	1:01.70; CR	Edoardo Giorgetti; Italy	1:02.32	Giedrius Titenis; Lithuania	1:02.51
200 m breaststroke	Dániel Gyurta; Hungary	2:10.71; CR	Alexey Zinovyev; Russia	2:12.48	Luca Pizzini; Italy	2:14.34
50 m butterfly	Konrad Czerniak; Poland	24.53	Ivan Lenđer; Serbia	24.57	Yauheni Lazuka; Belarus	24.59
100 m butterfly	Ivan Lenđer; Serbia	53.21; CR	Yauheni Lazuka; Belarus	53.90	Dinko Jukić; Austria	53.97
200 m butterfly	Dinko Jukić; Austria	1:59.57	Federico Bussolin; Italy	2:00.33	Peter Thompson; Great Britain	2:00.69
200 m individual medley	Dinko Jukić; Austria	2:01.34; CR	Mateusz Matczak; Poland	2:03.46	Vadym Fastenko; Ukraine	2:04.29
400 m individual medley	Mateusz Matczak; Poland	4:18.40	Dinko Jukić; Austria	4:21.61	Yannick Lebherz; Germany	4:23.49
4×100 m freestyle relay	Germany (51.31) Markus Deibler (50.33) Clemens Rapp (50.27) Cristoph Fildebrandt (49.59) Dimitri Colupaev	3:21.50	Great Britain (50.83) Christopher Fox (50.33) Adam Brown (51.12) Ryan Bennett (50.08) Grant Turner	3:22.36	Belgium (51.40) Glenn Surgeloose (51.24) Pholien Systermans (52.08) Francois Heersbrandt (49.46) Yoris Grandjean	3:24.18
4×200 m freestyle relay	Russia (1:52.67) Sergey Fesikov (1:50.48) Konstantin Kiselev (1:51.50) Dmitry Chechulin (1:48.69) Mikhail Polishschuk	7:23.34	Germany (1:49.40) Yannick Lebherz (1:51.86) Clemens Rapp (1:50.91) Cristoph Fildebrandt (1:51.39) Robin Backhaus	7:23.56	Italy (1:51.13) Filippo Barbacini (1:50.87) Damiano Lestingi (1:52.09) Alex Di Giorgio (1:50.29) Cesare Sciocchetti	7:24.38
4×100 m medley relay	Italy (55.74) Damiano Lestingi (1:01.05) Mattia Pesce (54.10) Marco Pellizzon (50.32) Michele Santucci	3:41.21; CR	Great Britain (55.97) Marco Loughran (1:03.42) Max Partridge (54.65) James Doolan (50.25) Adam Brown	3:44.29	Hungary (56.98) Gábor Balog (1:01.01) Dániel Gyurta (54.65) Péter Bordás (51.79) Ádám Dajka	3:44.43

=== Girl's events ===
Event	Gold		Silver		Bronze	
50 m freestyle	Kateryna Dikidzhi; Ukraine	25.95	Elodie Schmitt; France	26.23	Kristel Vourna; Greece	26.33
100 m freestyle	Kateryna Dikidzhi; Ukraine	56.51	Lisa Vitting; Germany	56.75	Orsolya Tompa; Hungary	56.81
200 m freestyle	Margaux Fabre; France	2:02.21	Lauren Collins; Great Britain	2:03.26	Fiona Duclos; France	2:03.35
400 m freestyle	Elena Sokolova; Russia	4:12.53	Margaux Fabre; France	4:15.11	Sasha Matthews; Great Britain	4:16.45
800 m freestyle	Elena Sokolova; Russia	8:38.80	Margaux Fabre; France	8:47.64	Fanni Szeder; Hungary	8:50.23
1500 m freestyle	Elena Sokolova; Russia	16:24.12	Kira Parkhomenko; Russia	16:58.86	Fanni Szeder; Hungary	17:04.34
50 m backstroke	Christin Zenner; Germany	29.12; CR	Elizabeth Simmonds; Great Britain	29.24	Karolina Urbanska; Poland	30.21
100 m backstroke	Elizabeth Simmonds; Great Britain	1:01.37; CR	Christin Zenner; Germany	1:03.35	Iwona Lefanowicz; Poland	1:03.58
200 m backstroke	Elizabeth Simmonds; Great Britain	2:12.36	Oxana Shlapakova; Russia	2:14.72	Zuzanna Mazurek; Poland	2:16.36
50 m breaststroke	Yuliya Yefimova; Russia	31.45; CR	Elise Matthysen; Belgium	32.36	Hanna Westrin; Sweden	32.37
100 m breaststroke	Hanna Westrin; Sweden	1:09.17; CR	Yuliya Yefimova; Russia	1:09.28	Vitalina Simonova; Russia	1:10.29
200 m breaststroke	Yuliya Yefimova; Russia	2:25.23; CR	Vitalina Simonova; Russia	2:29.10	Hanna Westrin; Sweden	2:29.44
50 m butterfly	Beatrix Bordas; Hungary	27.19	Monika Babok; Croatia	27.48	Mélanie Henique; France	27.57
100 m butterfly	Orsolya Tompa; Hungary	1:00.22	Emese Kovacs; Hungary	1:00.30	Ellen Gandy; Great Britain	1:00.59
200 m butterfly	Emese Kovacs; Hungary	2:08.55; CR	Nina Shiffer; Germany	2:11.98	Andriana Terzi; Greece	2:12.39
200 m individual medley	Elizabeth Simmonds; Great Britain	2:14.44	Theresa Michalak; Germany	2:14.75	Francesca Aceto; Italy	2:18.65
400 m individual medley	Caterina Brighi; Italy	4:50.38	Eleonora Tafi; Italy	4:50.43	Nina Shiffer; Germany	4:50.90
4×100 m freestyle relay	Germany (57.69) Uta Müller (57.06) Bianca Gast (57.06) Franziska Jansen (55.52) Lisa Vitting	3:47.85	Great Britain (57.46) Rebecca Turner (57.20) Ellen Gandy (57.59) Jenna Turner (56.74) Lauren Collins	3:48.99	Russia (57.56) Polina Kiseleva (57.62) Oxana Shlapakova (57.66) Ekaterina Borovikova (56.75) Elena Sokolova	3:49.59
4×200 m freestyle relay	Great Britain (2:04.84) Sasha Matthews (2:00.62) Ellen Gandy (2:02.20) Rebecca Turner (2:03.80) Lauren Collins	8:11.46	France (2:05.19) Maeva Bremond (2:03.79) Malaguie Delabre (2:03.47) Fiona Duclos (2:02.85) Margaux Fabre	8:15.30	Italy (2:03.10) Jasmin Agnoletto (2:04.60) Eleonora Tafi (2:06.28) Martina de Memme (2:05.02) Caterina Brighi	8:19.00
4×100 m medley relay	Great Britain (1:01.33) Elizabeth Simmonds (1:11.35) Alexandra Warren (59.89) Ellen Gandy (56.72) Lauren Collins	4:09.29; CR	Russia (1:04.02) Oxana Shlapakova (1:08.06) Yuliya Yefimova (1:01.75) Veronika Popova (56.41) Elena Sokolova	4:10.24	Sweden (1:06.37) Eleonor Lindborg (1:08.60) Hanna Westrin (1:02.64) Martina Granström (55.60) Nathalie Lindborg	4:13.21
