= 2006 FINA Youth World Swimming Championships =

2006 FINA World Youth Swimming Championships
- Host city: Rio de Janeiro, Brazil
- Date: August 22–27, 2006

The I FINA World Youth Swimming Championships, were held August 22–27, 2006, in Rio de Janeiro, Brazil. This was the first time the event was held.

The meet took place at the Parque Aquático Júlio de Lamare, a traditional Brazilian pool, which the next year would host the water polo competitions of the 2007 Pan American Games. The meet was contested in a 50 m pool (i.e. "long course meters").

The participants had to be 17 years or younger on the 31 December 2006 (i.e. born 1989 or later).

== Medals table ==
Place	Nation	1st place, gold medalist(s)	2nd place, silver medalist(s)	3rd place, bronze medalist(s)	Total
1	Italy	9	6	2	17
2	United States	5	1	8	14
3	France	4	2	2	9
4	Russia	3	10	4	17
5	China	3	2	4	8
6	Poland	3	1	0	4
7	Spain	2	2	1	5
8	Germany	2	1	3	6
9	Belgium	2	1	0	3
10	Brazil	1	3	1	5
11	Romania	1	2	0	3
12	Serbia	1	1	0	2
12	New Zealand	1	1	0	2
14	Austria	1	0	2	3
14	Ukraine	1	0	2	3
16	Belarus	1	0	0	1
17	South Africa	0	3	6	9
18	Great Britain	0	2	2	4
19	Malaysia	0	2	0	2
20	Ecuador	0	0	1	1
20	Lithuania	0	0	1	1
20	Panama	0	0	1	1
Total		40	40	40	120

== Medal summary ==
=== Boy's events ===
Event	Gold		Silver		Bronze	
Boy's freestyle
50 m	Yoris Grandjean; Belgium	22.74; CR	Sergey Fesikov; Russia	22.92	Wesley Gilchrist; South Africa	23.19
100 m	Yoris Grandjean; Belgium	50.32; CR	Sergey Fesikov; Russia	50.84	Michele Santucci; Italy	51.24
200 m	Cesare Sciocchetti; Italy	1:51.97 =CR	Yoris Grandjean; Belgium	1:52.20	Scott Flowers; United States	1:52.23
400 m	Mateusz Matczak; Poland	3:54.99	Cesare Sciocchetti; Italy	3:56.49	Juan Luis Rodriguez; Spain	3:56.68
800 m	Maciej Hreniak; Poland	8:04.84; CR	Juan Luis Rodriguez; Spain	8:06.92	Davide Sitti; Italy	8:09.67
1500 m	Maciej Hreniak; Poland	15:28.42	Juan Luis Rodriguez; Spain	15:32.83	Ian Rowe; United States	15:33.97
Boy's backstroke
50 m	Leonardo Guedes; Brazil	26.26; CR	Damiano Lestingi; Italy	26.52	Garth Tune; South Africa	26.57
100 m	Damiano Lestingi; Italy	55.74; CR	Leonardo Guedes; Brazil	56.43	Matthew Thompson; United States	57.42
200 m	Cory Chitwood; United States	2:00.68; CR	Damiano Lestingi; Italy	2:00.84	Scott Flowers; United States	2:01.66
Boy's breaststroke
50 m	Mattia Pesce; Italy	28.43; CR	Csaba Szilágyi; Serbia	29.05	Édgar Crespo; Panama	29.13
100 m	Edoardo Giorgetti; Italy	1:02.31; CR	Mattia Pesce; Italy	1:02.65	Mikhael Ermolaev; Russia	1:03.46
200 m	Edoardo Giorgetti; Italy	2:15.44	Luca Pizzini; Italy	2:15.56	Giedrius Titenis; Lithuania	2:16.57
Boy's butterfly
50 m	Yauheni Lazuka; Belarus	24.56; CR	Cândido Silva Junior; Brazil	24.91	Kirill Chibisov; Russia	24.94
100 m	Ivan Lenđer; Serbia	54.31; CR	Daniel Bego; Malaysia	54.40	Kirill Chibisov; Russia	54.63
200 m	Dinko Jukić; Austria	2:01.64; CR	Daniel Bego; Malaysia	2:02.13	Marco Camargo; Ecuador	2:04.41
Boy's individual medley
200 m	Scott Flowers; United States	2:03.62; CR	Xavier Mohammed; Great Britain	2:04.69	Denys Dubrov; Ukraine	2:04.70
400 m	Scott Flowers; United States	4:21.33; CR	Mateusz Matczak; Poland	4:23.42	Dinko Jukić; Austria	4:24.39
Boy's relays
4 × 100 m freestyle	Italy; Marco Pellizzon; Damiano Lestingi; Michele Santucci; Cesare Sciocchetti	3:26.84; CR	Russia; Mikhail Polischuk; Dmitri Chechulin; Anton Anchin; Sergey Fesikov	3:27.36	South Africa; Graeme Moore; Jay-Cee Thomson; Garth Tune; Wesley Gilchrist	3:29.52
4 × 200 m freestyle	Italy; Filippo Barbacini; Manuel Vicenzi; Damiano Lastingi; Cesare Sciocchetti	7:32.23; CR	Brazil; Alan Silva; João de Lucca; José Rezende Neto; Marcelo Monteiro	7:37.36	South Africa; Riaan Schoeman; Jay-Cee Thomson; Morne Boshoff; Wesley Gilchrist	7:40.97
4 × 100 m medley	Italy; Damiano Lestingi; Edoardo Giorgetii; Marco Pellizzon; Michele Santucci	3:44.22; CR	Russia; Anton Anchin; Mikhael Ermolaev; Kirill Chibisov; Sergey Fesikov	3:44.28	Brazil; Leonardo Guedes; Mauricio Pereira Filho; Frederico Castro; Alan Silva	3:50.23

=== Girl's events ===
Event	Gold		Silver		Bronze	
Girl's freestyle
50 m	Daniela Schreiber; Germany	25.55; CR	Ionela Cozma; Romania	25.61	Camille Muffat; France	25.71
100 m	Daniela Schreiber; Germany	55.59; CR	Ionela Cozma; Romania	55.96	Camille Muffat; France	56.47
200 m	Ophélie-Cyrielle Étienne; France	2:00.44; CR	Tang Yi; China	2:01.26	Leah Gingrich; United States	2:02.04
400 m	Mireia Belmonte García; Spain	4:14.29; CR	Jessica Rodriguez; United States	4:14.45	Leah Gingrich; United States	4:14.49
800 m	Ionela Cozma; Romania	8:38.91; CR	Wendy Trott; South Africa	8:40.69	Anastasia Ivanenko; Russia	8:40.81
1500 m	Aurélie Muller; France	16:35.32; CR	Anastasia Ivanenko; Russia	16:40.99	Wendy Trott; South Africa	16:41.36
Girl's backstroke
50 m	Zhou Yanxin; China	29.49; CR	Emily Thomas; New Zealand	29.58	Christin Zenner; Germany	29.61
100 m	Natalie Wiegersma; New Zealand	1:02.41; CR	Anastasia Zuyeva; Russia	1:02.83	Zhou Yanxin; China	1:03.10
200 m	Anastasia Zuyeva; Russia	2:15.27; CR	Ophélie-Cyrielle Étienne; France	2:16.49	Chen Wen; China	2:17.01
Girl's breaststroke
50 m	Wang Qun; China	32.21	Vitalina Simonova; Russia	32.63	Zhao Jin; China	32.65
100 m	Wang Qun; China	1:09.21; CR	Vitalina Simonova; Russia	1:09.35	Caitlin Leverenz; United States	1:09.94
200 m	Vitalina Simonova; Russia	2:26.58; CR	Wang Qun; China	2:28.41	Caitlin Leverenz; United States	2:28.57
Girl's butterfly
50 m	Lyubov Korol; Ukraine	27.38	Ilaria Bianchi; Italy	27.45	Lena Celina Hiller; Germany	27.48
100 m	Ilaria Bianchi; Italy	59.57; CR	Keri-Leigh Shaw; South Africa	1:00.25	Jemma Lowe; Great Britain	1:00.31
200 m	Cartnell Kalisz; United States	2:12.34	Jemma Lowe; Great Britain	2:13.52	Nina Dittrich; Austria	2:13.92
Girl's individual medley
200 m	Caitlin Leverenz; United States	2:14.45; CR	Camille Muffat; France	2:15.29	Wang Qun; China	2:18.13
400 m	Mireia Belmonte García; Spain	4:47.38; CR	Anastasia Ivanenko; Russia	4:50.27	Bianca Meyer; South Africa	4:51.86
Girl's relays
4 × 100 m freestyle	France; Ophélie-Cyrielle Étienne; Justine Lignot; Roxane Devillers Favreau; Camille Muffat	3:46.73; CR	Germany; Sophie-Luise Dietrich; Lena Celina Hiller; Jenny Lahl; Daniela Schreiber	3:46.99	Ukraine; Olga Danylyuk; Lyubov Korol; Mariya Yatsenko; Darya Stepanyuk	3:49.42
4 × 200 m freestyle	France; Faureau Devillers; Nathalie Hedin; Justine Lignot; Ophélie-Cyrielle Étienne	8:12.38; CR	Russia; Anastasia Aksenova; Olga Shulgina; Victoria Malyutina; Anastasia Ivanenko	8:16.62	Germany; Daniela Schreiber; Lena Celina Hiller; Antje Mahn; Sophie-Luise Dietrich	8:17.74
4 × 100 m medley	Russia; Anastasia Zuyeva; Vitalina Simonova; Anastasia Aksenova; Olga Shulgina	4:10.88; CR	South Africa; Karin Prinsloo; Yolana du Plesis; Keri-Leigh Shaw; Christy Lategan	4:11.39	Great Britain; Georgia Davies; Alexandra Warren; Jemma Lowe; Rachael George	4:13.15
