= 2010 FINA World Swimming Championships (25 m) – Men's 4 × 200 metre freestyle relay =

Men's 4 × 200 m Free Relay at the 2010 Short Course Worlds
- Dates: 16 December 2010
- Teams: 16
- Winning time: 6:49.04 WR

Medalists
gold medal	Russia
silver medal	United States
bronze medal	France

The Men's 4 × 200 m Freestyle Relay at the 10th FINA World Swimming Championships (25m) was swum on 16 December 2010 in Dubai, United Arab Emirates. 16 nations swam in the Preliminary heats in the morning, from which the top-8 finishers advanced to the Final that evening.

At the start of the event, the existing World (WR) and Championship records (CR) were:

Record	Time	Nation	Swimmers	Location	Date
WR	6:51.05	Canada	Colin Russell (1:43.60); Stefan Hirniak (1:43.41); Brent Hayden (1:41.49); Joel Greenshields (1:42.55)	Leeds	7 August 2009
CR	6:55.65	Australia	Kirk Palmer (1:44.23); Grant Brits (1:44.89); Nicholas Sprenger (1:43.11); Kenrick Monk (1:43.42)	Manchester	10 April 2008

The following records were established during the competition:

Date	Round	Name	Nation	Time	WR	CR
16 December 2010	Final	Nikita Lobintsev (1:42.10); Danila Izotov (1:42.15); Evgeny Lagunov (1:42.32); Alexander Sukhorukov (1:42.47)	Russia	6:49.04	WR	CR

== Results ==
=== Heats ===
Rank	Heat	Lane	Nation	Name	Time	Notes
1	2	4	United States	David Walters (1:44.70); Garrett Weber-Gale (1:43.38); Charlie Houchin (1:44.28); Ricky Berens (1:44.17)	6:56.53	Q
2	2	5	Russia	Alexander Sukhorukov (1:45.18); Evgeny Lagunov (1:43.35); Mikhail Polishchuk (1:44.99); Danila Izotov (1:43.96)	6:57.48	Q
3	2	8	Germany	Paul Biedermann (1:43.60); Stefan Herbst (1:43.50); Benjamin Starke (1:44.70); Markus Deibler (1:46.03)	6:59.83	Q
4	1	1	France	Clément Lefert (1:44.69); Fabien Gilot (1:45.75); Antton Haramboure (1:47.43); Yannick Agnel (1:42.71)	7:00.58	Q
5	1	4	Australia	Tommaso D'Orsogna (1:44.80); Patrick Murphy (1:43.71); Mitchell Dixon (1:45.77); Kyle Richardson (1:48.03)	7:02.31	Q
6	1	7	China	Jiang Haiqi (1:44.14); Dai Jun (1:46.53); Zhang Zhongchao (1:45.77); Jiang Yuhui (1:46.86)	7:03.30	Q
7	2	1	Czech Republic	Květoslav Svoboda (1:47.32); Michal Rubáček (1:45.64); Martin Verner (1:46.80); Jan Šefl (1:45.39)	7:05.15	Q
8	1	3	Brazil	Rodrigo Castro (1:45.72); Nicolas Oliveira (1:47.13); Lucas Kanieski (1:48.32); Fernando Santos (1:45.03)	7:06.20	Q
9	2	6	Venezuela	Cristian Quintero (1:45.33); Daniele Tirabassi (1:46.18); Roberto Gómez (1:48.20); Alejandro Gómez (1:48.72)	7:08.43	
10	1	5	Sweden	David Ernstsson (1:48.64); Robin Andréasson (1:48.41); Simon Sjödin (1:46.84); Mattias Carlsson (1:45.89)	7:09.78	
11	2	3	Belgium	Pholien Systermans (1:47.80); Yoris Grandjean (1:47.93); Mathieu Fonteyn (1:49.06); Pierre-Yves Romanini (1:48.06)	7:12.85	
12	1	6	Chinese Taipei	Hsu Chi-Chieh (1:49.49); Yuan Ping (1:49.96); Lin Yu-An (1:55.64); Lin Shih-Chieh (1:53.95)	7:29.04	
13	2	2	Kuwait	Yousef Alaskari (1:54.77); Abdullah Altuwaini (1:50.73); Mohammed Madouh (1:55.98); Saoud Altayar (1:56.18)	7:37.66	
14	1	8	Malta	Neil Agius (1:58.03); Edward Caruana Dingli (1:55.25); Andrea Agius (1:57.92); Mark Sammut (1:57.43)	7:48.63	
15	2	7	Macau	Tong Antonio (1:56.20); Chou Kit (2:03.30); Lao Kuan Fong (1:59.72); Ngou Pok Man (1:58.68)	7:57.90	
16	1	2	United Arab Emirates	Obaid Aljasmi (1:57.74); Mubarak Al-Besher (2:01.00); Kaabi Ali Ai (2:00.70); Faisal Al Jasmi (2:03.58)	8:03.02	

=== Final ===
Rank	Lane	Nation	Name	Time	Notes
1st place, gold medalist(s)	5	Russia	Nikita Lobintsev (1:42.10); Danila Izotov (1:42.15); Evgeny Lagunov (1:42.32); Alexander Sukhorukov (1:42.47)	6:49.04	WR
2nd place, silver medalist(s)	4	United States	Peter Vanderkaay (1:43.83); Ryan Lochte (1:40.48); Garrett Weber-Gale (1:42.89); Ricky Berens (1:42.38)	6:49.58	
3rd place, bronze medalist(s)	6	France	Yannick Agnel (1:41.95); Fabien Gilot (1:42.55); Clément Lefert (1:45.01); Jérémy Stravius (1:43.54)	6:53.05	
4	3	Germany	Paul Biedermann (1:42.33); Markus Deibler (1:44.08); Stefan Herbst (1:43.70); Benjamin Starke (1:44.01)	6:54.12	
5	2	Australia	Tommaso D'Orsogna (1:43.88); Patrick Murphy (1:43.71); Mitchell Dixon (1:45.02); Kyle Richardson (1:44.80)	6:57.41	
6	7	China	Jiang Haiqi (1:44.54); Zhang Zhongchao (1:44.33); Jiang Yuhui (1:46.29); Dai Jun (1:46.98)	7:02.14	
7	1	Czech Republic	Jan Šefl (1:45.22); Michal Rubáček (1:46.12); Martin Verner (1:46.52); Květoslav Svoboda (1:46.56)	7:04.42	
8	8	Brazil	Rodrigo Castro (1:46.87); Fernando Santos (1:44.70); Nicolas Oliveira (1:46.70); Lucas Kanieski (1:47.92)	7:06.19	
