= Valaitis =

Valaitis is a Lithuanian surname. Notable people with the surname include:

- Aurimas Valaitis (born 1988), Lithuanian swimmer
- Gene Valaitis, Canadian radio personality
- Lena Valaitis (born 1943), Lithuanian-German singer
