= Orsolya Tompa =

Hungarian swimmer (born 1991)

Personal information
- Full name: Orsolya Tompa
- National team: Hungary
- Born: 14 July 1991 (age 34) Budapest, Hungary
- Height: 1.70 m (5 ft 7 in)
- Weight: 57 kg (126 lb)

Sport
- Sport: Swimming
- Strokes: Freestyle, butterfly
- Club: Jövő SC
Medal record
Women's swimming
Representing Hungary
European Junior Championships
Gold medal – first place	2007 Antwerp	100 m butterfly
Bronze medal – third place	2007 Antwerp	100 m freestyle

Orsolya Tompa (born July 14, 1991, in Budapest) is a Hungarian swimmer, who specialized in sprint freestyle and butterfly events. She represented her nation Hungary at the 2008 Summer Olympics, and has edged out fellow swimmer Emese Kovács to claim the 100 m butterfly title by eight hundredths of a second (0.08) at the 2007 European Junior Swimming Championships in Antwerp, Belgium, with a time of 1:00.22.

Tompa qualified for the Hungarian team in the women's 100 m freestyle at the 2008 Summer Olympics in Beijing. Leading up to the Games, she posted a time of 56.81 to eclipse an insurmountable FINA B-standard (57.17) by 0.36 of a second at the European Junior Championships in Antwerp. Swimming in heat two, Tompa opened up the race with a marvelous lead, but faded down the stretch to hit the wall with a third-place time and a lifetime best in 56.57, just a hundredth of a second (0.01) behind runner-up Natthanan Junkrajang of Thailand. Tompa failed to advance to the semifinals, as she placed fortieth overall in the prelims.

Tompa sought to compete for the Hungarian swimming team in the women's 4 × 100 m medley relay at the 2012 Summer Olympics in London, but did not show up in the prelims.
