= Norbert Kovács =

Norbert Kovács may refer to:

- Norbert Kovács (footballer)
- Norbert Kovács (swimmer)
