= Dikidzhi =

Dikidzhi (Russian: Дикиджи) is a surname of Turkic origin. People with the name include:

- Kateryna Dikidzhi (born 1991), a Ukrainian swimmer.
- Vladislav Dikidzhi (born 2004), a Russian figure skater;
