= 2010 FINA World Swimming Championships (25 m) – Men's 400 metre freestyle =

Men's 400m Freestyle at the 2010 Short Course Worlds
- Dates: 17 December 2010
- Competitors: 51
- Winning time: 3:37.06

Medalists
gold medal	Paul Biedermann	Germany
silver medal	Nikita Lobintsev	Russia
bronze medal	Oussama Mellouli	Tunisia

The Men's 400 Freestyle at the 10th FINA World Swimming Championships (25m) was swum 17 December 2010 in Dubai, United Arab Emirates. 51 individuals swam in the preliminary heats in the morning, with the top-8 finishers advancing to the final that evening to swim again.

At the start of the event, the existing World (WR) and Championship records (CR) were:

	Name	Nation	Time	Location	Date
WR	Paul Biedermann	Germany	3:32.77	Berlin	14 November 2009
CR	Grant Hackett	Australia	3:35.01	Hong Kong	1 April 1999

== Results ==
=== Heats ===
Rank	Heat	Lane	Name	Time	Notes
1	7	4	Oussama Mellouli (TUN)	3:39.64	Q
2	7	5	Peter Vanderkaay (USA)	3:39.96	Q
3	6	4	Mads Glæsner (DEN)	3:39.98	Q
4	5	5	Ahmed Mathlouthi (TUN)	3:40.07	Q
5	7	6	Yannick Agnel (FRA)	3:40.16	Q
6	7	2	Nikita Lobintsev (RUS)	3:40.31	Q
7	5	6	Sébastien Rouault (FRA)	3:40.77	Q
8	6	5	Paul Biedermann (GER)	3:41.44	Q
9	5	4	Federico Colbertaldo (ITA)	3:41.68	
10	6	2	Dominik Meichtry (SUI)	3:41.85	
11	6	5	Patrick Murphy (AUS)	3:42.53	
12	6	3	Charlie Houchin (USA)	3:43.12	
13	7	3	Pál Joensen (FRO)	3:44.42	
14	7	7	Zhang Zhongchao (CHN)	3:45.17	
15	6	1	Gergely Gyurta (HUN)	3:45.19	
16	1	3	Dai Jun (CHN)	3:45.34	
17	5	3	Mikhail Polischuk (RUS)	3:45.84	
18	4	3	Cristian Quintero (VEN)	3:46.06	
19	3	3	Hassaan Abdel Khalik (CAN)	3:46.21	
20	4	1	Daniele Tirabassi (VEN)	3:46.60	
21	5	2	Samuel Pizzetti (ITA)	3:46.71	
22	5	8	Heerden Herman (RSA)	3:46.77	
23	5	7	Lucas Kanieski (BRA)	3:46.82	
24	7	8	Serhiy Frolov (UKR)	3:46.85	
25	5	1	Christian Scherübl (AUT)	3:47.54	
26	7	1	Květoslav Svoboda (CZE)	3:48.37	
27	3	4	Velimir Stjepanović (SRB)	3:48.56	
28	4	5	Sebastián Jahnsen Madico (PER)	3:50.03	
29	6	7	Gard Kvale (NOR)	3:50.28	
30	3	6	Esteban Enderica (ECU)	3:50.41	
31	6	8	Mitchell Dixon (AUS)	3:51.71	
32	4	2	Julio Galofre (COL)	3:52.92	
33	4	8	Ventsislav Aydarski (BUL)	3:53.80	
34	4	4	Esteban Paz (ARG)	3:54.10	
35	4	7	Gabriel Villagoiz (ARG)	3:55.18	
36	3	5	Mohamed Farhoud (EGY)	3:55.32	
37	3	8	Irakli Revishvili (GEO)	3:56.50	
38	3	7	Ivan Enderica Ochoa (ECU)	3:58.53	
39	3	1	Morad Berrada (MAR)	3:59.35	
40	3	2	Yousef Al-Askari (KUW)	3:59.88	
41	2	3	Matthew Abeysinghe (SRI)	4:00.93	
42	4	6	Oleg Rabota (KAZ)	4:00.98	
43	2	5	Sauod Altayar (KUW)	4:02.19	
44	2	6	Neil Agius (MLT)	4:07.46	
45	2	7	Edward Caruana Dingli (MLT)	4:08.10	
46	2	8	Derrick Bakhuis (AHO)	4:12.41	
47	2	1	Anderson Lim (BRU)	4:25.66	
48	2	2	Israr Hussain (PAK)	4:27.06	
49	2	4	Gert Kacani (ALB)	4:34.27	
50	1	4	Enea Murataj (ALB)	4:46.80	
51	1	5	Chamraen Youri Maximov (CAM)	4:49.74	

=== Final ===
Rank	Lane	Name	Nationality	Time	Notes
1st place, gold medalist(s)	8	Paul Biedermann	Germany	3:37.06	
2nd place, silver medalist(s)	7	Nikita Lobintsev	Russia	3:37.84	
3rd place, bronze medalist(s)	4	Oussama Mellouli	Tunisia	3:38.17	
4	5	Peter Vanderkaay	United States	3:38.44	
5	3	Mads Glæsner	Denmark	3:38.56	
6	1	Sébastien Rouault	France	3:40.07	
6	2	Yannick Agnel	France	3:40.07	
8	6	Ahmed Mathlouthi	Tunisia	3:40.33	
