= Marco Loughran =

English swimmer (born 1989)

Personal information
- Full name: Marco Antonio Loughran
- Nickname: "Mate"
- National team: Great Britain
- Born: 24 March 1989 (age 37) Wimbledon, England
- Height: 1.88 m (6 ft 2 in)
- Weight: 82 kg (181 lb)

Sport
- Sport: Swimming
- Strokes: Backstroke, butterfly
- Club: Guildford City
- College team: University of Florida (U.S.)
Medal record
Men's swimming
Representing Great Britain
European Junior Championships
Gold medal – first place	2007 Antwerp	100 m backstroke
Silver medal – second place	2007 Antwerp	50 m backstroke
Silver medal – second place	2007 Antwerp	200 m backstroke
Silver medal – second place	2007 Antwerp	4×100 m medley
Bronze medal – third place	2005 Palma	4×100 m medley
SEC Championships 2009
Gold medal – first place	2009 Georgia	200 yd backstroke
Silver medal – second place	2009 Georgia	100 yd backstroke
Silver medal – second place	2009 Georgia	200 yd medley relay
Silver medal – second place	2009 Georgia	400 yd medley relay
SEC Championships 2010
Gold medal – first place	2010 Florida	400 yd medley relay
Gold medal – first place	2010 Florida	200 yd medley relay
Gold medal – first place	2010 Florida	100 yd backstroke
Gold medal – first place	2010 Florida	200 yd backstroke
Silver medal – second place	2010 Florida	200 yd freestyle relay
2015 FINA Swimming World Cup
Bronze medal – third place	2015 FINA Swimming World Cup	100 m backstroke

Marco Antonio Loughran (born 24 March 1989) is an English competitive swimmer who has represented Great Britain at the Olympics and FINA world championships, European Championships and Wales in the Commonwealth Games. He has also competed under Team Europe at Duel in the Pool 2011.

Loughran is from Tolworth, a town in Surrey, England. In high school, he was awarded a swimming scholarship to The Southport School in Queensland, Australia. While there, Marco was known as one of the "offshore boys". He then accepted a full athletic scholarship to attend the University of Florida in Gainesville, Florida, where he trained and competed with coach Gregg Troy's Florida Gators swimming and diving team in National Collegiate Athletic Association (NCAA) and Southeastern Conference (SEC) competition in 2009 and 2010. In two American college swimming seasons, he received three All-American honours. Winning 4 golds (200yard backstroke 2009 as a freshman, 100/200 backstroke and 4x50 Medley relay 2010) at SEC’s clean sweeping the Men’s backstroke category. In both of years Marco swam at UF, he recorded the fastest Men’s 200 yard backstroke in the NCAA prior to the March finals.

In 2008 Loughran recorded a Top-10 European ranking in the Men’s 200 m Backstroke and at the time of competition was ranked 9th globally. He qualified for both the Men’s 100/200m backstroke at the 2008 Beijing Olympic Games. Loughran competed in the 2009 World Aquatics Championships in Rome, Italy. He raced in the 50, 100 and 200 backstroke events. 2010 swam for Wales at the 2010 Commonwealth Games held in Delhi, India. He came 4th (100m backstroke) 5th (50m backstroke) 6th (200m backstroke). In 2012 he competed for Team GB at the 2012 Olympic Games in London. He swam in the men's 200m backstroke and finished 18th, missing the semi-finals. He was the highest placing Team GB male athlete in this event.

In 2013 he won the men's 50-metre backstroke at the British Championships, held in Sheffield. He competed again for Wales at the 2014 Commonwealth Games.

In June 2015, Loughran and his girlfriend Jeanette Ottesen were attacked in a road rage incident in Copenhagen, during which he sustained several injuries. In 2016, he and Jeanette wed at a private ceremony in Copenhagen and welcomed their baby daughter Billie-Mai in December 2017.

== Personal life ==
He has been in a relationship with Danish swimmer Jeanette Ottesen since 2014. Loughran and Ottesen got engaged in early 2017. In June 2017, they announced that they are expecting their first child. They were married in Copenhagen on July 16, 2017. In December, 2017 Ottesen gave birth to a girl. In December 2022 Jeanette Ottesen announced they were getting divorced. Loughran's father hails from Caerleon, Wales whilst his mother is from Venezuela
