= Michele Santucci =

Italian swimmer (born 1989)

Personal information
- Full name: Michele Santucci
- Nationality: Italian
- Born: 30 May 1989 (age 37) Castiglion Fiorentino, Italy

Sport
- Sport: Swimming
- Strokes: Freestyle
- Club: Fiamme Azzurre
Medal record
World Championships (LC)
| Bronze medal – third place | 2015 Kazan | 4×100 m freestyle |
World Championships (SC)
| Silver medal – second place | 2012 Istanbul | 4×100 m freestyle |
European Championships (LC)
| Silver medal – second place | 2012 Debrecen | 4×100 m freestyle |
World Junior Championships
| Gold medal – first place | 2006 Rio de Janeiro | 4×100 m freestyle |
| Gold medal – first place | 2006 Rio de Janeiro | 4×100 m medley |
| Bronze medal – third place | 2006 Rio de Janeiro | 100 m freestyle |
European Junior Championships
| Gold medal – first place | 2007 Antwerp | 4×100 m medley |
| Silver medal – second place | 2006 Palma de Mallorca | 4×200 m freestyle |
| Bronze medal – third place | 2006 Palma de Mallorca | 4×100 m freestyle |
Summer Universiade
| Silver medal – second place | 2009 Belgrade | 4×100 m freestyle |

Michele Santucci (born 30 May 1989) is an Italian swimmer. He competed for Italy in the men's 4 x 100 m freestyle relay at the 2008, 2012 and 2016 Olympics.

== See also ==
- Italy at the 2012 Summer Olympics - Swimming
