= 2008 European Junior Swimming Championships =

Water sport competitions

The 2008 European Junior Swimming Championships were held from July 30 to August 3, 2008, in Belgrade, Serbia. The age groups for this event are girls born in 1992 or 1993 and boys born in 1990 and 1991. The tournament is held in a 50 m pool. All events which are held in senior championships are included in the junior championships, including non-Olympic events.

== Medal table ==
* Host nation (Serbia)

Rank	Nation	Gold	Silver	Bronze	Total
1	Great Britain (GBR)	10	5	3	18
2	Russia (RUS)	6	7	11	24
3	Italy (ITA)	4	8	3	15
4	Poland (POL)	3	5	3	11
5	Serbia (SRB)*	3	1	0	4
6	Faroe Islands (FRO)	3	0	0	3
7	Germany (GER)	2	4	5	11
8	Hungary (HUN)	2	1	1	4
9	Belgium (BEL)	2	0	0	2
10	France (FRA)	1	4	4	9
11	Netherlands (NED)	1	3	0	4
12	Slovenia (SLO)	1	0	2	3
12	Ukraine (UKR)	1	0	2	3
14	Spain (ESP)	1	0	1	2
15	Greece (GRE)	0	1	1	2
16	Denmark (DEN)	0	1	0	1
17	Czech Republic (CZE)	0	0	1	1
17	Israel (ISR)	0	0	1	1
17	Romania (ROM)	0	0	1	1
17	Turkey (TUR)	0	0	1	1
Totals (20 entries)		40	40	40	120

== Medal summary ==
=== Male events ===
Event	Gold		Silver		Bronze	
Boy's freestyle
50 m	Luca Dotto; Italy	22.36	Oleg Tikhobaev; Russia	22.47	Vlad Razvan Caciuc; Romania	22.56
100 m	Oleg Tikhobaev; Russia	50.03	Marcin Tarczyński; Poland	50.11	Marco Orsi; Italy	50.16
200 m	Robert Bale; Great Britain	1:49.05	Artem Lobuzov; Russia	1:49.29	Alex Di Giorgio; Italy	1:49.33
400 m	Pál Joensen; Faroe Islands	3:51.44	Alex Di Giorgio; Italy	3:51.55	Xavier Mohammed; Great Britain	3:54.21
800 m	Pál Joensen; Faroe Islands	7:56.90	Raoul Shaw; France	8:02.70	Pavel Medvetskiy; Russia	8:04.56
1500 m	Pál Joensen; Faroe Islands	15:18.37	Krzysztof Pielowski; Poland	15:24.63	Raoul Shaw; France	15:25.02
Boy's backstroke
50 m	Artem Dubovskoy; Russia	26.25	Stefano Mauro Pizzamiglio; Italy	26.34	Vitaly Melnikov; Russia	26.36
100 m	Christopher Walker-Hebborn; Great Britain	55.44	Artem Dubovskoy; Russia	55.58	Vitaly Borisov; Russia	56.07
200 m	Christopher Walker-Hebborn; Great Britain	1:59.61	Gábor Balog; Hungary	2:01.01	Eric Ress; France	2:01.43
Boy's breaststroke
50 m	Nicolo Ossola; Italy	28.26	Csaba Szilágyi; Serbia	28.28	Marco Koch; Germany	28.32
100 m	Csaba Szilágyi; Serbia	1:01.91	Marco Koch; Germany	1:01.98	Daniel Sliwinski; Great Britain	1:02.45
200 m	Marco Koch; Germany	2:12.25	Artem Babikhin; Russia	2:14.89	Maxim Shcherbakov; Russia	2:15.36
Boy's butterfly
50 m	Ivan Lenđer; Serbia	24.17	James Doolan; Great Britain	24.58	Goksu Bicer; Turkey	24.63
100 m	Ivan Lenđer; Serbia	52.53; EJCR	James Doolan; Great Britain	53.16	Alex Villaecija Garcia; Spain	54.28
200 m	Federico Bussolin; Italy	1:59.29	Roberto Pavoni; Great Britain	1:59.94	Jan Šefl; Czech Republic	1:59.96
Boy's individual medley
200 m	Xavier Mohammed; Great Britain	2:00.73; EJC	Jan David Schepers; Germany	2:03.22	Roberto Pavoni; Great Britain	2:04.03
400 m	Roberto Pavoni; Great Britain	4:19.95	Xavier Mohammed; Great Britain	4:20.74	Jan David Schepers; Germany	4:22.87
Boy's relays
4 × 100 m freestyle	Germany; Lucien Hassdenteufel; Jan David Schepers; Joel Ax; Dmitri Colupaev	3:19.36; EJC	Italy; Luca Dotto; Luca Leonardi; Francesco Donin; Marco Orsi	3:20.00	Russia; Oleg Tikhobaev; Alexander Shumaylov; Artem Lobuzov; Vladimir Bryukhov	3:20.84
4 × 200 m freestyle	Great Britain; Robert Bale; Thomas Parris; Ryan Bennett; Christopher Walker-Hebborn	7:19.98	Italy; Fabio Donanzan; Filippo Barbacini; Niccolò Maschi; Alex Di Giorgio	7:22.72	Russia; Evgeniy Ayzetullov; Pavel Medvetskiy; Dmitry Bokankhel; Artem Lobuzov	7:23.78
4 × 100 m medley	Great Britain; Christopher Walker-Hebborn; James Doolan; Daniel Sliwinski; Robert Bale	3:39.75; EJCR	Russia; Artem Dubovskoy; Kirill Chibisov; Maxim Shcherbakov; Oleg Tikhobaev	3:41.16	Italy; Stefano Mauro Pizzamiglio; Federico Bussolin; Andrea Toniato; Marco Orsi	3:43.10

=== Female events ===
Event	Gold		Silver		Bronze	
Girl's freestyle
50 m	Jolien Sysmans; Belgium	25.40	Elodie Schmitt; France	25.47	Kristel Vourna; Greece	25.94
100 m	Jolien Sysmans; Belgium	56.00	Silvia di Pietro; Italy	56.17	Viktoriya Andreeva; Russia	56.20
200 m	Patricia Castro Ortega; Spain	2:00.45	Sharon van Rouwendaal; Netherlands	2:01.30	Camille Radou; France	2:01.74
400 m	Anne Bochmann; Great Britain	4:12.51	Sharon van Rouwendaal; Netherlands	4:12.53	Margaux Fabre; France	4:12.60
800 m	Nika Karlina Petric; Slovenia	8:36.92	Sharon van Rouwendaal; Netherlands	8:39.00	Melanie Radicke; Germany	8:45.80
1500 m	Sharon van Rouwendaal; Netherlands	16:36.44	Margaux Fabre; France	16:43.79	Neja Skufca; Slovenia	16:46.99
Girl's backstroke
50 m	Eva Dobar; Hungary	29.42	Klaudia Nazieblo; Poland	29.62	Kseniya Grygorenko; Ukraine	29.63
100 m	Alicja Tchorz; Poland	1:02.98	Pernille Larsen; Denmark	1:03.29	Kseniya Grygorenko; Ukraine	1:03.38
200 m	Kseniya Grygorenko; Ukraine	2:13.32	Valentina Lucconi; Italy	2:14.16	Klaudia Nazieblo; Poland	2:14.83
Girl's breaststroke
50 m	Ekaterina Baklakova; Russia	32.34	Paulina Zachoszsz; Poland	32.83	Vitalina Simonova; Russia	32.85
100 m	Ekaterina Baklakova; Russia	1:09.65	Paulina Zachoszsz; Poland	1:10.83	Yuliya Banach; Israel	1:10.90
200 m	Ekaterina Baklakova; Russia	2:28.42	Vitalina Simonova; Russia	2:29.63	Paulina Zachoszsz; Poland	2:31.22
Girl's butterfly
50 m	Beatrix Bordas; Hungary	26.43; EJCR	Silvia Di Pietro; Italy	26.83	Lena Kalla; Germany	26.86
100 m	Silvia Di Pietro; Italy	59.28	Lena Kalla; Germany	1:00.28	Beatrix Bordas; Hungary	1:00.77
200 m	Mirela Olczak; Poland	2:11.50	Silvia Meschiari; Italy	2:12.65	Alicja Tchorz; Poland	2:13.28
Girl's individual medley
200 m	Viktoriya Andreeva; Russia	2:16.09	Sophie Allen; Great Britain	2:16.40	Alexandra Musienko; Russia	2:17.24
400 m	Anne Bochmann; Great Britain	4:46.58	Alexandra Musienko; Russia	4:48.30	Nika Petric; Slovenia	4:49.04
Girl's relays
4 × 100 m freestyle	France; Camille Radou; Marie Sophie Castelle; Margaux Fabre; Elodie Schmitt	3:45.75	Germany; Franziska Jansen; Rebecca Ottke; Lena Kalla; Melanie Radicke	3:47.60	Russia; Anna Martynova; Vitalina Simonova; Ksenia Lavrentyeva; Viktoriya Andreeva	3:49.02
4 × 200 m freestyle	Great Britain; Rebecca Turner; Lucy Worrall; Alexandra Hooper; Anne Bochmann	8:08.82; EJCR	France; Marie Sophie Castelle; Adeline Martin; Margaux Fabre; Camille Radou	8:12.15	Germany; Theresa Michalak; Katharina David; Melanie Radicke; Franziska Jansen	8:16.05
4 × 100 m medley	Poland; Alicja Tchorz; Mirela Olczak; Paulina Zachoszcz; Katarzyna Wilk	4:10.96	Greece; Aspasia Petradaki; Panagiota Tsialta; Maria Georgia Michalaka; Theodora Drakou	4:12.40	Russia; Maria Khan; Elena Shamaeva; Ekaterina Baklakova; Viktoriya Andreeva	4:12.71

== See also ==
- 2008 in swimming
