= Kurt Dittrich =

Austrian swimmer

Personal information
- Born: 29 January 1958 (age 68) Vienna, Austria

Sport
- Sport: Swimming

Kurt Dittrich (born 29 January 1958) is an Austrian swimmer. He competed in the men's 100 metre butterfly at the 1980 Summer Olympics. He participated in the men's 100-meter butterfly event, achieving a personal best time of 56.12 seconds in that year. At the Olympics, Dittrich finished 21st overall in the event

Dittrich was affiliated with Schwimm-Union Wien, a swimming club in Austria.

He is also the father and coach of Nina Dittrich, another swimmer who has competed at the international level
