= Wang Qun (swimmer) =

Chinese swimmer (born 1991)

Personal information
- Full name: 王群
- Nationality: Chinese
- Born: 17 November 1991 (age 34) Qingdao, Shandong, China
- Height: 181 cm (5 ft 11 in)
- Weight: 60 kg (130 lb)

Sport
- Sport: Swimming
- Strokes: Breaststroke, individual medley
- Club: Qingdao Military Sports School
- Coach: Shi Lili, Zhang Yadong, Tao Rong
Medal record
Women's swimming
Representing China
Asian Games
Silver medal – second place	2010 Guangzhou	200 m medley
Bronze medal – third place	2006 Doha	50 m breaststroke
East Asian Games
Gold medal – first place	2005 Manila	100 m breaststroke
Gold medal – first place	2005 Manila	200 m breaststroke
FINA Youth World Swimming Championships
Gold medal – first place	2006 Rio de Janeiro	50 m breaststroke
Gold medal – first place	2006 Rio de Janeiro	50 m breaststroke
Silver medal – second place	2006 Rio de Janeiro	200 m breaststroke
Silver medal – second place	2006 Rio de Janeiro	200 m medley

Wang Qun (Chinese: 王群; pinyin: Wáng Qún; born 17 November 1991) is a Chinese swimmer who specialised in the breaststroke.

== Career ==
Wang attended the Qingdao Military Sports School where she was coached by Shi Lili. She never joined the provincial team but jumped directly onto the national team in 2005 after she broke the School Games record in both the 100m and 200m breaststroke.

At the 2005 East Asian Games in Macao, she defeated star teammate Luo Xuejuan in the 100m event. At the world short course championships in 2006, she qualified to the breaststroke final and placed seventh. She was a double medalist at the Asian Games, winning the bronze in the 50 m breaststroke in the 2006 Asian Games in Doha and the silver medal in the 200m individual medley at the 2010 Asian Games in Guangzhou.

She won four medals at the 2006 FINA Youth World Swimming Championships, including two golds in the breaststroke.

Wang was a member of the Chinese team at the 2008 Olympic Games in Beijing but did not compete. She was noticed by the media after photos of her training showed marks from cupping therapy.

== Major achievements ==
- 2003 Shandong Provincial Championships - 1st 100 m breast
- 2006 World Cup in Berlin - 2nd 200 m breast
- 2006 World Cup in Stockholm - 6th 200 m breast
- 2006 National Championships - 2nd 200 m breast
- 2005 East Asian Games - 1st 100 m & 200 m breast
- 2007 National Championships - 1st 200 m breast
- 2006 Asian Games - 3rd 50 m breast
- 2010 Asian Games - 2nd 200 m individual medley
- 2010 National Championships - 3rd 200 m breast
