= Alexey Zinovyev =

Russian swimmer (born 1990)

Personal information
- Full name: Aleksey Anatolyevich Zinovyev
- National team: Russia
- Born: 15 February 1990 (age 36) Moscow, Russian SFSR, Soviet Union
- Height: 1.82 m (6 ft 0 in)
- Weight: 80 kg (176 lb)

Sport
- Sport: Swimming
- Strokes: Breaststroke
Medal record
Men's swimming
Representing Russia
World Junior Championships
Gold medal – first place	2008 Monterrey	200 m breaststroke
European Junior Championships
Silver medal – second place	2007 Antwerp	200 m breaststroke

Aleksey Anatolyevich Zinovyev (also Alexey Zinovyev, Russian: Алексей Анатольевич Зиновьев; born February 15, 1990) is a Russian swimmer, who specialized in breaststroke events. He set a meet record (2:14.78) to claim the gold medal in the 200 m breaststroke at the 2008 FINA Youth World Swimming Championships in Monterrey, Mexico, and was eventually selected to the Russian swimming team at the Summer Olympics in Beijing on that same year.

Zinovyev competed as a lone Russian swimmer in the men's 200 m breaststroke at the 2008 Summer Olympics in Beijing. One year earlier, he finished with a second-place time in 2:12.48 to dip beneath the FINA A-cut and assure a direct selection to the Russian Olympic team at the European Junior Championships in Antwerp, Belgium. Swimming in heat five, Zinovyev could not keep his pace from a vastly more sophisticated field to accept the last spot instead in 2:16.40, almost four seconds short of his entry time. Zinovyev failed to advance to the semifinals, as he placed forty-fifth overall in the prelims.
