= Vitalina Simonova =

Russian swimmer (born 1992)

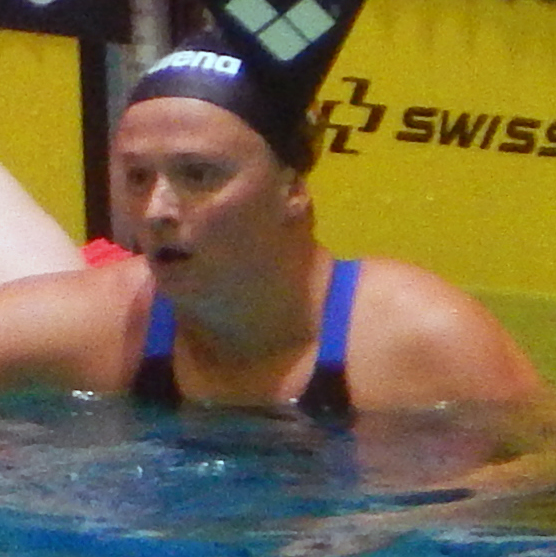
- Simonova at the 2018 Russian National Championships

Personal information
- Nationality: Russian
- Born: 18 September 1992 (age 33) Orsk, Russia

Sport
- Sport: Swimming
- Strokes: Breaststroke
- Club: Babz
Medal record
Representing Russia
European championships (LC)
Gold medal – first place	2018 Glasgow	4×100 m medley
Bronze medal – third place	2014 Berlin	4×100 m mixed medley relay
European championships (SC)
Silver medal – second place	2013 Herning	200 m breaststroke
FINA Youth World Swimming Championships
Gold medal – first place	2006 Rio de Janeiro	200 m breaststroke
Gold medal – first place	2006 Rio de Janeiro	4×100 m medley
Silver medal – second place	2006 Rio de Janeiro	50 m breaststroke
Silver medal – second place	2006 Rio de Janeiro	100 m breaststroke
European Junior Swimming Championships
Silver medal – second place	2007 Antwerp	200 m breaststroke
Silver medal – second place	2007 Antwerp	4×100 m medley
Silver medal – second place	2008 Belgrade	200 m breaststroke
Bronze medal – third place	2007 Antwerp	100 m breaststroke
Bronze medal – third place	2008 Belgrade	50 m breaststroke

Vitalina Olegovna Simonova (Russian: Виталина Олеговна Симонова; born 18 September 1992) is a Russian breaststroke swimmer. She finished third in the individual 200 m at the 2013 European Short Course Swimming Championships, but later received a silver medal after the winner, Yuliya Yefimova, failed a doping test. She was also part of the Russian mixed medley relay team that won a bronze medal at the 2014 European Aquatics Championships.

Simonova also competes in the freestyle with fins, and won two world titles in 2012, in the 50 m and 100 m events.
