= Marcin Tarczyński =

Polish swimmer (born 1990)

Personal information
- National team: Poland
- Born: 10 September 1990 (age 35) Nowy Dwór, Poland
- Height: 1.90 m (6 ft 3 in)
- Weight: 84 kg (185 lb)

Sport
- Sport: Swimming
- Strokes: Freestyle, backstroke
- College team: University of California, Berkeley (USA)
- Coach: Dave Druden (USA)
Medal record
Men's swimming
Representing Poland
European Junior Championships
Silver medal – second place	2008 Belgrade	100 m freestyle

Marcin Tarczyński (born 10 September 1990 in Nowy Dwór) is a Polish swimmer, who specialized in freestyle and backstroke events. He is a silver medalist at the 2008 European Junior Swimming Championships in Belgrade, Serbia, and later represented Poland at the 2012 Summer Olympics in London. While studying in the United States, Tarczynski also holds a school record and 200 m individual medley title at the 2012 NCAA Men's Swimming and Diving Championships.

Tarczynski reached his first international spotlight at the 2008 European Junior Swimming Championships in Belgrade, Serbia, where he earned a silver medal in the 100 m freestyle (50.11).

In 2010, Tarczynski attended UC Berkeley in Berkeley, California, where he majored in molecular biology, and played for the California Golden Bears swimming and diving team under head coach Dave Durden. His sporting hero Bartosz Kizierowski, an alumnus and a four-time Olympian, also inspired him to come to the United States, prompting Tarczynski's decision to experience college life of balancing academics and sport. While currently swimming for the Golden Bears, Tarczynski posted a time of 1:41.97, the eleventh fastest of all-time, to claim a 200 m individual medley title at the 2012 NCAA Men's Swimming and Diving Championships in Federal Way, Washington.

Tarczynski also competed in the 100 m backstroke at the 2012 Summer Olympics in London. He cleared both a national record and a FINA A-cut of 54.12 from the Polish Long Course Championships in Olsztyn. He challenged seven other swimmers in heat five, including France's top favorite Camille Lacourt and Russia's Arkady Vyatchanin, bronze medalist in Beijing four years earlier. Tarczysnki saved a seventh spot over Lacourt's teammate Benjamin Stasiulis by three-tenths of a second (0.30), in a time of 55.06. Tarczysnki failed to advance into the semifinals, as he placed twenty-seventh overall on the second day of prelims.
