= Nataliya Khudyakova =

Ukrainian swimmer (born 1985)

Personal information
- Full name: Nataliya Khudyakova
- National team: Ukraine
- Born: 8 February 1985 (age 41) Brovary, Ukrainian SSR, Soviet Union
- Height: 1.74 m (5 ft 9 in)
- Weight: 64 kg (141 lb)

Sport
- Sport: Swimming
- Strokes: Freestyle
- Club: Dynamo Kyiv

Nataliya Khudyakova (Ukrainian: Наталія Худякова; born February 8, 1985, in Brovary) is a Ukrainian swimmer, who specialized in freestyle events.

Khudyakova competed for Ukraine in three swimming events at the 2008 Summer Olympics. Leading up to the Games, she cleared FINA B-standard entry time of 2:02.88 (200 m freestyle) at the EDF Swimming Open in Paris and 4:19.67 (400 m freestyle) at the Universiade in Bangkok, Thailand. Khudyakova also teamed up with Darya Stepanyuk, Kateryna Dikidzhi, and Hanna Dzerkal in the 4 × 100 m freestyle relay. Swimming the anchor leg in heat two, Khudyakova recorded a split of 56.54 seconds, and the Ukrainian team went on to finish the prelims in fourteenth overall with a final time of 3:44.72.

In the 400 m freestyle, Khudyakova challenged six other swimmers on the second heat, including two-time Olympian Golda Marcus of El Salvador. She raced to second and thirty-third overall by a quarter of a second (0.25) behind Venezuela's Yanel Pinto in 4:18.34. In her third event, 200 m freestyle, Khudyakova posted her personal best of 2:02.27 to top the first heat by 0.61 of a second ahead of Thailand's Natthanan Junkrajang. Khudyakova failed to advance into the semifinals, as she placed thirty-fifth overall in the preliminaries.
