= Monika Babok =

Croatian swimmer

Personal information
- Full name: Monika Babok
- National team: Croatia
- Born: 30 November 1991 (age 34) Zagreb, Socialist Republic of Croatia, Socialist Federal Republic of Yugoslavia
- Height: 1.76 m (5 ft 9 in)
- Weight: 65 kg (143 lb)

Sport
- Sport: Swimming
- Strokes: Freestyle, butterfly
- Club: Plivački Klub Sisak JANAF
- College team: Southern Methodist University (U.S.)
Medal record
Women's swimming
Representing Croatia
European Junior Championships
Silver medal – second place	2007 Antwerp	50 m butterfly

Monika Babok (born November 30, 1991) is a Croatian swimmer, who specialized in freestyle and butterfly events. She represented her nation Croatia at the 2008 Summer Olympics, and has won a silver medal in the 50 m butterfly (27.48) at the 2007 European Junior Swimming Championships in Antwerp, Belgium. Babok was a member of the SMU Mustangs swimming and diving team, and a graduate of sports management at the Southern Methodist University in Dallas, Texas.

Babok competed for the Croatian swimming team in the women's 50 m freestyle, as Croatia's youngest swimmer (aged 16), at the 2008 Summer Olympics in Beijing. She qualified for the Games with a 26.25 to eclipse the insurmountable FINA B-cut (26.32) by 0.07 of a second at the European Championships in Eindhoven, Netherlands. Swimming as the fastest entrant in heat seven, Babok could not produce her pre-Olympic effort with 26.84 to accept the seventh spot in a splash-and-dash finish. Babok failed to advance into the semifinals, as she placed forty-ninth overall out of 92 swimmers in the prelims.
