= Mitchell Dixon =

Australian freestyle, backstroke swimmer

Personal information
- Full name: Mitchell Dixon
- Nationality: Australia
- Born: 4 January 1990 (age 36) Sydney, New South Wales, Australia
- Height: 1.85 m (6 ft 1 in)
- Weight: 82 kg (181 lb)

Sport
- Sport: Swimming
- Strokes: Freestyle, backstroke
- Club: SOPAC
- Coach: Brant Best
Medal record
Men's swimming
Representing Australia
Universiade
| Bronze medal – third place | 2011 Shenzhen | 4×200 m freestyle |

Mitchell Dixon (born 4 January 1990 in Sydney, New South Wales) is an Australian freestyle, backstroke swimmer.

At the 2010 Australian Short Course Swimming Championships, Dixon finished 6th in the final of the 200 metre freestyle and first in the B-final of the 400 metre freestyle. At the conclusion of the meet, Dixon was named as part of a 30-man squad to compete at the 2010 World Short Course Championships in Dubai. One of five debutants, Dixon became the 701st swimmer to represent Australia at a senior international meet. At the World Championships, Dixon placed 31st in the 400 metre freestyle and alongside Tommaso D'Orsogna, Patrick Murphy and Kyle Richardson placed 5th in the final of the 4 × 200 metre freestyle relay.

The following year at the 2011 Summer Universiade, Dixon with David McKeon, Kristopher Taylor and Nic Ffrost won bronze in the 4 × 200 metre freestyle relay.
