= Dominik Straga =

Croatian swimmer (born 1988)

Personal information
- Full name: Dominik Straga
- National team: Croatia
- Born: 20 June 1988 (age 38) Rijeka, SR Croatia, SFR Yugoslavia
- Height: 1.88 m (6 ft 2 in)
- Weight: 84 kg (185 lb)

Sport
- Sport: Swimming
- Strokes: Freestyle, butterfly
- Club: PK Nevera Rijeka
Medal record
Men's swimming
Representing Croatia
European Junior Championships
Bronze medal – third place	2006 Palma	50 m butterfly
Bronze medal – third place	2006 Palma	100 m butterfly

Dominik Straga (born June 20, 1988) is a Croatian swimmer, who specialized in freestyle and butterfly events. He represented his nation Croatia at the 2008 Summer Olympics and has claimed multiple Croatian championship titles and three national records in the long and short course freestyle (100 and 200 m), and butterfly (50, 100, and 200 m). He also won two bronze medals in the same stroke (50 and 100 m) at the 2006 European Junior Swimming Championships in Palma de Mallorca, Spain, with respective times of 24.62 and 54.51.

Straga competed for the Croatian swimming team in the men's 200 m freestyle at the 2008 Summer Olympics in Beijing. Leading up to the Games, he finished with a third-place time in 1:51.53 to eclipse a FINA B standard (1:52.53) by exactly a second at the Croatian Open Championships in Dubrovnik. Swimming on the outside in heat three, Straga overhauled a sub-1:50 barrier to smash a scintillating Croatian record time of 1:49.63 for the second spot, just a 0.59 of a second behind Papua New Guinea's Ryan Pini. Straga's fantastic record-breaking finish would not be enough to put him through to the semifinals, finishing thirty-seventh overall in the prelims.
