= Katalin Bor =

Hungarian swimmer (born 1990)

Personal information
- Full name: Katalin Bor
- National team: Hungary
- Born: 10 February 1990 (age 36) Budapest, Hungary
- Height: 1.64 m (5 ft 5 in)
- Weight: 62 kg (137 lb)

Sport
- Sport: Swimming
- Strokes: Breaststroke
- Club: Jövő SC (HUN)
Medal record
Women's swimming
Representing Hungary
European Junior Championships
Silver medal – second place	2006 Palma	4×100 m medley
Bronze medal – third place	2006 Palma	200 m breaststroke

Katalin Bor (born February 10, 1990, in Budapest) is a Hungarian swimmer, who specialized in breaststroke events. She represented her nation Hungary at the 2008 Summer Olympics, and has won a career total of two medals (one silver and one bronze) in a major international competition, spanning the 2006 European Junior Swimming Championships in Palma de Mallorca, Spain.

Bor competed for Hungary in the women's 200 m breaststroke at the 2008 Summer Olympics in Beijing. Leading up to the Games, she cleared a FINA B-standard entry time of 2:31.13 from the national championships in Budapest. Swimming on the outside lane in heat three, Bor overhauled a 2:30-barrier to touch out Morocco's Sara El Bekri at the final turn for the third spot by nine hundredths of a second (0.09) with a lifetime best of 2:29.95. Bor failed to advance into the semifinals, as she placed twenty-seventh out of 41 swimmers in the prelims.
