= Nina Dittrich =

Austrian swimmer (born 1990)

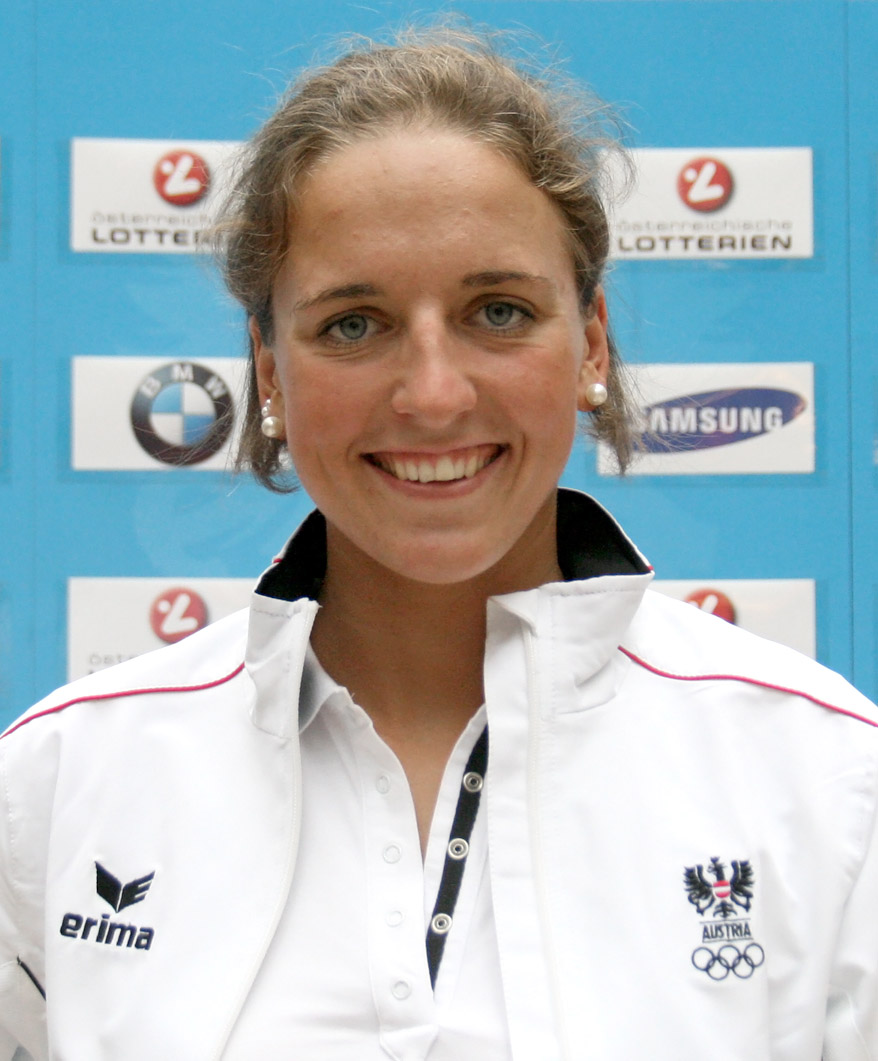

Personal information
- Nationality: Austria
- Born: 20 November 1990 (age 35) Vienna, Austria
- Height: 1.74 m (5 ft 8 1/2 in)
- Weight: 58 kg (128 lb)

Sport
- Sport: Swimming
- Strokes: Freestyle, butterfly
- Club: SVS Simmering
- Coach: Kurt Dittrich
Medal record
Women's swimming
Representing Austria
World Junior Championships
Bronze medal – third place	2006 Rio de Janeiro	200 m butterfly
European Junior Championships
Silver medal – second place	2006 Palma	200 m medley
Bronze medal – third place	2006 Palma	200 m butterfly

Nina Dittrich (born 20 November 1990 in Vienna) is an Austrian swimmer who specializes in freestyle and butterfly events. She is a multiple-time Austrian champion, a five-time national record holder, and also a current member of Simmering Swimming Club (German: Schwimmverein Schwechat Simmering) in Schwechat. Dittrich is also the daughter of Ulrike Bauer, an Austrian record holder in both 100 and 200 m breaststroke, and Kurt Dittrich, a sprint butterfly swimmer who competed at the 1980 Summer Olympics in Moscow.

== Swimming career ==
At age sixteen, Dittrich made her international debut at the 2006 European Junior Swimming Championships in Palma de Mallorca, Spain, where she captured two medals, silver and bronze, in the women's butterfly and individual medley (both 200 m), posting her time of 2:12.84 and 2:17.86, respectively. In the same year, she won another bronze medal in the same discipline at the FINA Youth World Championships in Rio de Janeiro, Brazil, with a time of 2:13.92, four tenths of a second (0.40) behind runner-up Jemma Lowe of Great Britain.

Dittrich qualified for the women's 200 m butterfly at the 2008 Summer Olympics in Beijing, by clearing a FINA B-cut of 2:10.86 from the International Vienna Championships in Vienna. She challenged six other swimmers on the second heat, including South Africa's Katheryn Meaklim and Singapore's Tao Li. She came in second place, 0.44 of a second behind Meaklim, with an Austrian record-breaking time of 2:09.85. Dittrich, however, narrowly missed out of the semifinals by less than a second, as she placed seventeenth out of 36 swimmers in the preliminary heats.

At the 2010 European Swimming Championships in Budapest, Hungary, Dittrich achieved a sixth-place finish in the women's 1500 m freestyle, posting a national record-breaking time of 16:23.63.

Four years after competing in her first Olympics, Dittrich qualified for her second Austrian team, as a 22-year-old, at the 2012 Summer Olympics in London, by attaining a B-standard entry time of 8:39.67 in the women's 800 m freestyle. She challenged seven other swimmers on the second heat, including fellow two-time Olympians Khoo Cai Lin of Malaysia and Lynette Lim of Singapore. She came in fifth place, less than 0.03 of a second behind Mexico's Patricia Castañeda Miyamoto, with a time of 8:45.41. Dittrich, however, failed to advance into the final, as she placed twenty-eighth in the overall rankings. Shortly after the Olympics, Dittrich announced her retirement from swimming career.
