= Kateryna Dikidzhi =

Ukrainian swimmer (born 1991)

Personal information
- Full name: Kateryna Dikidzhi
- National team: Ukraine
- Born: 11 July 1991 (age 34) Rivne, Ukrainian SSR, Soviet Union
- Height: 1.76 m (5 ft 9 in)
- Weight: 60 kg (132 lb)

Sport
- Sport: Swimming
- Strokes: Freestyle
- Club: Dynamo Rivne
Medal record
Women's swimming
Representing Ukraine
European Junior Championships
Gold medal – first place	2007 Antwerp	50 m freestyle
Gold medal – first place	2007 Antwerp	100 m freestyle

Kateryna Dikidzhi (Ukrainian: Катерина Дікіджі; born July 11, 1991) is a Ukrainian swimmer, who specialized in sprint freestyle events. She sprinted to two gold medals in the 50 and 100 m freestyle at the 2007 European Junior Swimming Championships in Antwerp, Belgium, with respective times of 25.95 and 56.51.

As a 17-year-old teen, Dikidzhi teamed up with Darya Stepanyuk, Nataliya Khudyakova, and Hanna Dzerkal for the Ukrainian squad in the women's 4 × 100 m freestyle relay at the 2008 Summer Olympics in Beijing. Swimming the second leg, Dikidzhi recorded a split of 55.44 seconds, and the Ukrainian went on to finish the prelims in fourteenth overall with a final time of 3:44.72.
