= Norbert Kovács (swimmer) =

Hungarian swimmer (born 1988)

Personal information
- Full name: Norbert Kovács
- National team: Hungary
- Born: 13 February 1988 (age 38) Veszprém, Hungary
- Height: 1.80 m (5 ft 11 in)
- Weight: 72 kg (159 lb)

Sport
- Sport: Swimming
- Strokes: Freestyle, butterfly
- Club: Kőbánya SC
- College team: University of Tennessee (U.S.)
- Coach: Zsigmond Gyenge
Medal record
Men's swimming
Representing Hungary
European Junior Championships
Bronze medal – third place	2006 Palma	200 m butterfly

Norbert Kovács (born 13 February 1988 in Veszprém) is a Hungarian swimmer, who specialized in freestyle and butterfly events. He represented his nation Hungary at the 2008 Summer Olympics, and has won a bronze medal in the 200 m butterfly at the 2006 European Junior Swimming Championships in Palma de Mallorca, Spain with a time of 2:00.20. Kovacs is a member of the swimming team for Kőbánya Sport Club in Budapest, under the tutelage of head coach Zsigmond Gyenge.

Kovacs competed for Hungary in two swimming events at the 2008 Summer Olympics in Beijing. Leading up to the Games, he finished with a second-place time in 1:49.91 (200 m freestyle) to dip beneath the FINA B-cut (1:52.53) at the Hungarian National Championships in Budapest. In the 200 m freestyle, Kovacs threw down a lifetime tech-suit best in 1:49.34 to race his way into third in heat four, but failed to advance further to the semifinals, finishing thirty-fifth overall in the prelims. Kovacs also competed as a member of the Hungarian team in the men's 4 × 200 m freestyle relay, along with fellow swimmers Dominik Kozma, Tamás Kerékjártó, and Gergő Kis. Swimming the anchor leg in heat two, Kovacs recorded a split of 1:48.40, and the Hungarian team went on to finish the race in sixth place and thirteenth overall with a total time of 7:14.14.

Kovacs is previously a varsity swimmer for the Tennessee Volunteers at the University of Tennessee in Knoxville, Tennessee, before he transferred to the University of Tampa in Florida, where he took up a major in finance and assigned as a senior captain for the Tampa Spartans swimming and diving team.
