= Sławomir Wolniak =

Polish swimmer

Personal information
- Full name: Sławomir Wolniak
- Nationality: Poland
- Born: January 23, 1988 (age 38)

Sport
- Sport: Swimming
- Club: AZS AWFiS Gdańsk

Sławomir Wolniak (born January 23, 1988) is a National Record holding swimmer from Poland who specializes in the breaststroke. He is a four-time Polish national champion, having captured the 50m and 100m breaststrokes in 2007, and the 100m and 200m breaststroke in 2009.

He is a member of Poland's swim team for the 2009 World Championships, in Rome, Italy at the end to July.

He swam for Poland at the 2007 World Championships in Melbourne, Australia in the 100 m and 200 m breaststrokes. He did not advance out of the preliminaries in either, finishing 29th in the 100 and 17th in the 200—just missing advancing in the 200 by 0.04 seconds.

== National records ==
Wolniak set the Polish Records in the 50m, 100, and 200m breaststrokes at the 2009 Polish Nationals (50m) in Ostrowiec Świętokrzyski, Poland, May 21–24. Ironically, Wolniak's record-setting effort in the 50 breast, came in the consolation final, as he failed to qualify for the “A” final.

Event	Time	Location	Date
50m breaststroke	28.01	Ostrowiec Św., Poland	May 22, 2009
100m breaststroke	1:00.66	Ostrowiec Św., Poland	May 24, 2009
200m breaststroke	2:10.90	Ostrowiec Św., Poland	May 23, 2009
