= Christin Zenner =

German swimmer

Personal information
- Nationality: Germany
- Born: 18 March 1991 (age 35) Plauen, Saxony, Germany
- Height: 1.75 m (5 ft 9 in)
- Weight: 61 kg (134 lb)

Sport
- Sport: Swimming
- Strokes: Backstroke
- Club: VfV Hildesheim
- Coach: Jacqueline Zenner
Medal record
Women's swimming
Representing Germany
European Junior Championships
Gold medal – first place	2006 Palma	50 m backstroke
Gold medal – first place	2007 Antwerp	50 m backstroke
Silver medal – second place	2007 Antwerp	100 m backstroke

Christin Zenner (born 18 March 1991 in Plauen, Saxony) is a German swimmer, who specialized in backstroke events. She is a two-time champion in the 50 m backstroke at the European Junior Swimming Championships (2006 in Palma de Mallorca, Spain and 2007 in Antwerp, Belgium). Zenner is also a member of the swimming team for VfV Hildesheim, and is coached and trained by her mother Jacqueline Zenner.

Zenner qualified for two swimming events, as Germany's youngest swimmer (aged 17), at the 2008 Summer Olympics in Beijing, by storming victories in the 100 and 200 m backstroke from the Olympic trials, in FINA A-standard entry times of 1:01.24 and 2:12.61. In the 100 m backstroke, Zenner challenged seven other swimmers on the sixth heat, including heavy favorites Reiko Nakamura of Japan and Laure Manaudou of France. She rounded out the field to last place and forty-second overall by one second behind Ukraine's Iryna Amshennikova in 1:03.87. In her second event, 200 m backstroke, Zenner finished thirty-fourth overall in the preliminary heats with a slowest time of 2:20.28.
