= Aurimas Valaitis =

Lithuanian swimmer (born 1988)

Personal information
- Full name: Aurimas Valaitis
- National team: Lithuania
- Born: 22 April 1988 (age 38) Kaunas, Lithuanian SSR, Soviet Union
- Height: 1.76 m (5 ft 9 in)
- Weight: 65 kg (143 lb)

Sport
- Sport: Swimming
- Strokes: Breaststroke
- Club: Centras Kaunas
Medal record
Men's swimming
Representing Lithuania
European Junior Championships
Bronze medal – third place	2006 Palma	50 m breaststroke

Aurimas Valaitis (born 22 April 1988) is a Lithuanian former swimmer, who specialized in breaststroke events. He beat a 29-second barrier to earn a bronze medal in the 50 m breaststroke at the 2006 European Junior Swimming Championships in Palma de Mallorca, Spain, with his personal best of 28.98.

Valaitis qualified for the men's 100 m breaststroke, as Lithuania's youngest swimmer (aged 16), at the 2004 Summer Olympics in Athens, by clearing a FINA B-standard entry time of 1:04.71 from the Dutch Open Swim Cup in Eindhoven, Netherlands. He challenged seven other swimmers on the third heat, including 15-year-old Nguyen Huu Viet of Vietnam. He raced to fourth place by 0.12 of a second behind New Zealand's Ben Labowitch, breaking his personal best of 1:04.11. Valaitis failed to advance into the semifinals, as he placed thirty-eighth overall on the first day of preliminaries.
