= Sergey Perunin =

Russian swimmer

Personal information
- Native name: Серге́й Перунин
- Born: 19 July 1988 (age 37) Volgograd, Russia
- Height: 1.85 m (6 ft 1 in)
- Weight: 76 kg (168 lb)

Sport
- Sport: Swimming
- Club: Volga, Volgograd
Medal record
Men's swimming
Representing Russia
World Championships
Silver medal – second place	2009 Rome	4×200 m freestyle
European Championships
Gold medal – first place	2010 Budapest	4×200 m freestyle

Sergey Perunin (Russian: Серге́й Перунин; born 19 July 1988) is a Russian swimmer who won a silver medal in the 4 × 200 m freestyle relay at the 2009 World Aquatics Championships. Next year he won a gold medal in the same event at the 2010 European Aquatics Championships setting a new European record.

In August 2012 he married Larisa Ilchenko, multiple open water swimming champion.
