= Yoris Grandjean =

Belgian Olympic swimmer

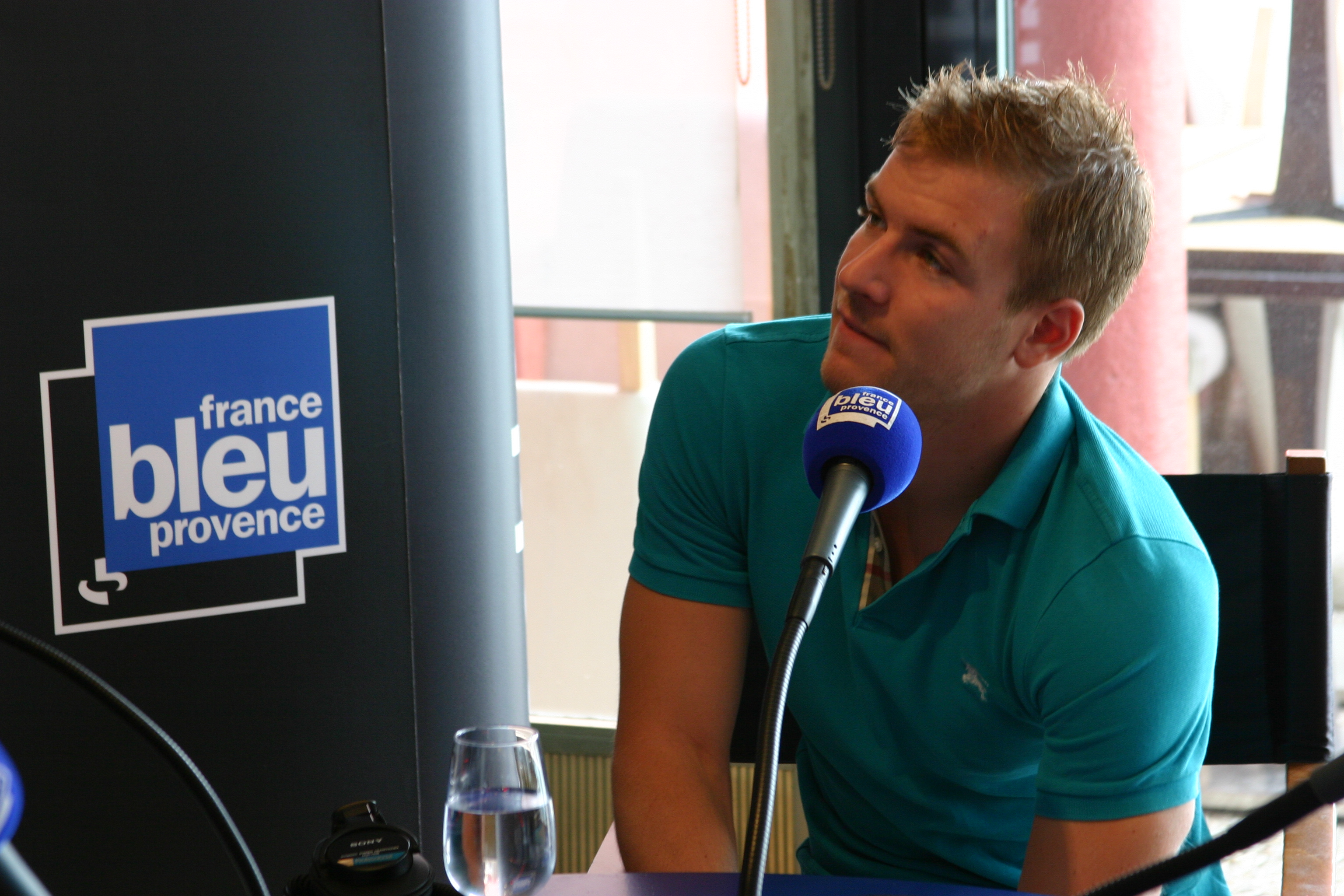

Personal information
- Full name: Yoris Grandjean
- National team: Belgium
- Born: 20 March 1989 (age 37) Liège, Belgium
- Height: 1.86 m (6 ft 1 in)
- Weight: 72 kg (159 lb)

Sport
- Sport: Swimming
- Strokes: Freestyle
- Club: Liège Natation (BEL); CN Antibes (FRA)
- Coach: Andre Henvaux
Medal record
Men's swimming
Representing Belgium
European Championships (SC)
| Bronze medal – third place | 2012 Chartres | 4×50 m freestyle |
| Bronze medal – third place | 2013 Herning | 4x50 m freestyle |
World Youth Championships
| Gold medal – first place | 2006 Rio de Janeiro | 50 m freestyle |
| Gold medal – first place | 2006 Rio de Janeiro | 100 m freestyle |
| Silver medal – second place | 2006 Rio de Janeiro | 200 m freestyle |

Yoris Grandjean (born 20 March 1989) is a Belgian swimmer, who specialized in sprint freestyle events. He won two gold medals at the 2006 FINA Youth World Swimming Championships, and later represented Belgium at the 2008 Summer Olympics. Since 2009, he still currently holds a Belgian record (22.13) in the 50 m freestyle from the national championships in Antwerp. Grandjean also trains for Liège Swimming Club (French: Club Natation Liège) under his head coach Andre Henvaux.

Grandjean made his international debut at the 2006 FINA Youth World Swimming Championships in Rio de Janeiro, Brazil, where he achieved a total of three medals, and established multiple meet records: two golds each in the 50 m freestyle (22.74) and 100 m freestyle (50.32), and a silver in the 200 m freestyle (1:52.20).

Entering his senior season, Grandjean competed in a sprint freestyle double at the 2008 Summer Olympics in Beijing. He achieved a FINA A-standard entry time of 49.09 (100 m freestyle) after finishing sixth from the European Championships in Eindhoven, Netherlands. In the 100 m freestyle, Grandjean placed nineteenth on the morning prelims. Swimming in heat seven, he blasted a new Belgian record of 48.82 in a Speedo techsuit, but narrowly missed the semifinal cut by only 0.27 of a second. Two days later, in the 50 m freestyle, Grandjean put up an astonishing swim with a fourth-place time and a Belgian record of 22.45 in heat nine, edging out Finland's Matti Rajakylä by a small fraction of a second. Grandjean failed to advance into the semifinals, as he placed twenty-eighth overall out of 97 swimmers in the prelims.

Grandjean was also selected as a reserve for the Belgian squad at the 2012 Summer Olympics in London, but did not compete in the 4 × 200 m freestyle relay. His teammates Louis Croenen, Dieter Dekoninck, Pieter Timmers, and Glenn Surgeloose failed to reach the top 8 final, finishing only in twelfth place with a time of 7:14.44.

At the 2012 European Short Course Swimming Championships in Chartres, France, Grandjean solidified his Belgian team (Timmers, Emmanuel Vanluchene, and Jasper Aerents) to take the bronze in the 4×50 m freestyle relay, posting their time of 1:25.60.
