= Emese Kovács =

Hungarian swimmer (born 1991)

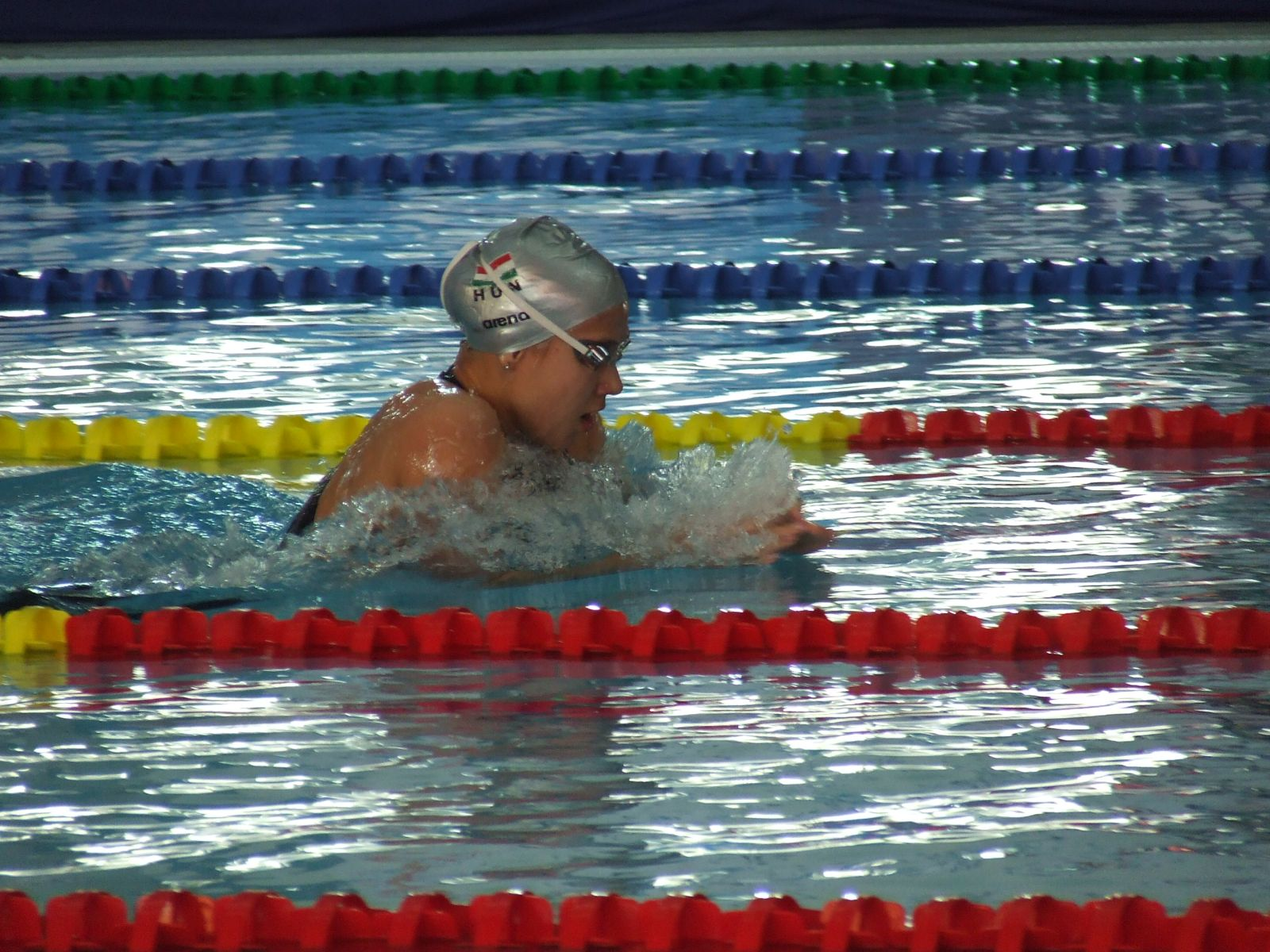
- Kovács Emese úszó

Personal information
- Full name: Emese Kovács
- Nationality: Hungary
- Born: March 1, 1991 (age 35) Baja, Hungary
- Height: 1.72 m (5 ft 8 in)
- Weight: 62 kg (137 lb)

Sport
- Sport: Swimming
- Strokes: Butterfly
- Club: Jovo SC
Medal record
Women's swimming
Representing Hungary
European Championships (LC)
Silver medal – second place	2008 Eindhoven	200 m butterfly
European Championships (SC)
Silver medal – second place	2007 Debrecen	200 m butterfly

Emese Kovács (born March 1, 1991) is a Hungarian swimmer from Baja.
