= Mikhail Polischuk =

Russian swimmer

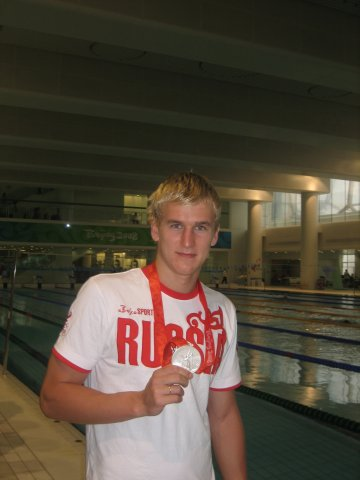
- Mikhail Polischuk in 2014

Personal information
- Born: Mikhail Mikhailovich Polischuk; 10 January 1989 (age 37) Moscow, Russian SFSR, Soviet Union
- Height: 1.88 m (6 ft 2 in)
- Weight: 88 kg (194 lb)

Sport
- Sport: Swimming
- Club: Dynamo Moscow
Medal record
Representing Russia
Olympic Games
Silver medal – second place	2008 Beijing	4×200 m freestyle
World Championships (LC)
Silver medal – second place	2009 Rome	4×200 m freestyle
World Championships (SC)
Gold medal – first place	2010 Dubai	4×200 m freestyle
Silver medal – second place	2014 Doha	4×100 m freestyle
Disqualified	2014 Doha	4×200 m freestyle
Summer Universiade
Gold medal – first place	2015 Gwangju	4x100 m medley
Bronze medal – third place	2015 Gwangju	4x100 m freestyle

Mikhail Mikhailovich Polischuk (Russian: Михаил Михайлович Полищук, born 10 January 1989) is a Russian freestyle swimmer. He was part of the Russian 4 × 200 m freestyle relay teams that finished in second and tenth place at the 2008 and 2012 Olympics, respectively.
